= Keondre =

Keondre may refer to:

- Keondre Coburn (born 2000), American professional football defensive tackle
- Keondre Jackson (born 2002), American professional football safety
