= 2024 Southern Illinois Salukis football team =

American college football season

2024 Southern Illinois Salukis football
- Conference: Missouri Valley Football Conference
- Record: 4–8 (2–6 MVFC)
- Head coach: Nick Hill (9th season)
- Offensive coordinator: Blake Rolan (6th season)
- Offensive scheme: Pro spread
- Defensive coordinator: Antonio James (2nd season)
- Base defense: 4–3
- Home stadium: Saluki Stadium

2024 Missouri Valley Football Conference standings
	Conf.			Overall
Team	W		L	W		L
No. 1 North Dakota State +^	7	–	1	14	–	2
No. 3 South Dakota State +^	7	–	1	12	–	3
No. 4 South Dakota +^	7	–	1	11	–	3
Missouri State *	6	–	2	8	–	4
No. 11 Illinois State ^	6	–	2	10	–	4
Youngstown State	3	–	5	4	–	8
Indiana State	3	–	5	4	–	8
North Dakota	2	–	6	5	–	7
Southern Illinois	2	–	6	4	–	8
Northern Iowa	1	–	7	3	–	9
Murray State	0	–	8	1	–	11
+ – Conference co-champions; ^ – FCS playoff participant; * – Ineligible for 2024 FCS playoffs due to transition to the FBS; Rankings from STATS Poll

The 2024 Southern Illinois Salukis football team represented Southern Illinois University Carbondale as a member of the Missouri Valley Football Conference (MVFC) during the 2024 NCAA Division I FCS football season. The Salukis were led by ninth-year head coach Nick Hill, and played their home games at Saluki Stadium in Carbondale, Illinois.

The Salukis quarterback room became decimated by injuries throughout the season, with the team turning to graduate assistant Michael Lindauer as quarterback late in the season; Lindauer previously played quarterback for the Salukis before retiring in June 2024. In the team's season finale, Lindauer threw for 7 touchdowns, breaking the program record for passing touchdowns in a single game.

== Preseason ==
=== MVFC poll ===
The MVFC released it preseason prediction poll on July 22, 2024. The Salukis were predicted to finish fourth in the conference.

== Schedule ==
Date	Time	Opponent	Rank	Site	TV	Result	Attendance
August 31	7:00 p.m.	at BYU*	No. 10	LaVell Edwards Stadium; Provo, UT	ESPN+	L 13–41	63,712
September 7	6:00 p.m.	at Austin Peay*	No. 10	Fortera Stadium; Clarksville, TN	ESPN+	W 31–17	8,124
September 14	6:00 p.m.	No. 12 Incarnate Word*	No. 9	Saluki Stadium; Carbondale, IL	ESPN+	W 35–28	7,879
September 21	6:00 p.m.	No. 21 Southeast Missouri State*	No. 7	Saluki Stadium; Carbondale, IL	ESPN+	L 21–38	13,421
September 28	1:00 p.m.	at No. 5 South Dakota	No. 17	DakotaDome; Vermillion, SD	ESPN+	L 13–42	6,706
October 5	6:00 p.m.	No. 18 Illinois State	No. 19	Saluki Stadium; Carbondale, IL	ESPN+	L 10–45	7,157
October 12	2:00 p.m.	No. 2 North Dakota State^{†}		Saluki Stadium; Carbondale, IL	ESPN+	L 3–24	9,610
October 26	12:00 p.m.	at Indiana State		Memorial Stadium; Terre Haute, IN	ESPN+	L 17–20	4,266
November 2	2:00 p.m.	at Missouri State		Robert W. Plaster Stadium; Springfield, MO	ESPN+	L 17–38	8,134
November 9	12:00 p.m.	Youngstown State		Saluki Stadium; Carbondale, IL	ESPN+	W 37–33	4,933
November 16	2:00 p.m.	at No. 3 South Dakota State		Dana J. Dykhouse Stadium; Brookings, SD	ESPN+	L 10–41	17,268
November 23	12:00 p.m.	Murray State		Saluki Stadium; Carbondale, IL	ESPN+	W 62–0	5,310
*Non-conference game; ^{†}Homecoming; Rankings from STATS Poll released prior to the game; All times are in Central time

== Game summaries ==
=== at BYU ===
No. 10 Southern Illinois Salukis at BYU Cougars – Game summary

Quarter	1	2	3	4	Total
No. 10 Salukis	0	6	7	0	13
Cougars	14	3	14	10	41

at LaVell Edwards Stadium, Provo, Utah

- Date: August 31
- Game time: 7:00 p.m. CDT/6:00 p.m. MDT
- Game weather: Sunny, 89 °F (32 °C)
- Game attendance: 63,712
- Referee: Kevin Randall
- TV announcers (ESPN+): Richard Cross and Barrett Brooks
- Box score, Recap

Game information

First quarter
Second quarter
Third quarter
Fourth quarter

Statistics	SIU	BYU
First downs	12	27
Total yards	231	527
Rushing yards	123	179
Passing yards	108	348
Turnovers	1	0
Time of possession	20:46	39:14

Team	Category	Player	Statistics
Southern Illinois	Passing	D. J. Williams	10/20, 98 yards, INT
Southern Illinois	Rushing	D. J. Williams	15 rushes, 121 yards, 2 TD
Southern Illinois	Receiving	Keontez Lewis	2 receptions, 49 yards
BYU	Passing	Jake Retzlaff	20/30, 348 yards, 3 TD
BYU	Rushing	LJ Martin	13 rushes, 67 yards, TD
BYU	Receiving	Chase Roberts	7 receptions, 108 yards

=== at Austin Peay ===
Game Two – No. 10 Southern Illinois Salukis (0–1) vs Austin Peay Governors (0–1) – Game summary

Quarter	1	2	3	4	Total
No. 10 Salukis	7	7	7	10	31
Governors	7	3	7	0	17

at Fortera Stadium • Clarksville, TN

- Date: September 7, 2024
- Game time: 6:00 p.m. CST
- Game weather: 0 °F (−18 °C)
- Game attendance: 8,124
- TV: ESPN+

Game information

First quarter
Second quarter
Third quarter
Fourth quarter

Statistics	SIU	APSU
First downs		
Total yards		
Rushing yards		
Passing yards		
Passing: Comp–Att–Int		
Time of possession		

Team	Category	Player	Statistics
Southern Illinois	Passing		
Southern Illinois	Rushing		
Southern Illinois	Receiving		
Austin Peay	Passing		
Austin Peay	Rushing		
Austin Peay	Receiving		

=== No. 12 Incarnate Word ===
No. 12 Incarnate Word Cardinals at No. 9 Southern Illinois Salukis – Game summary

Quarter	1	2	3	4	Total
No. 12 Cardinals	7	7	0	14	28
No. 9 Salukis	14	21	0	0	35

at Saluki Stadium, Carbondale, Illinois

- Date: September 14, 2024
- Game time: 6:00 p.m. CDT
- Game weather: Cloudy, 80 °F (27 °C)
- Game attendance: 7,879
- Referee: Aaron Adams
- TV announcers (ESPN+): Dan Gresham (play-by-play), Lemont Williams (analyst) and Bob Slovak (sideline)
- Box score, Recap

Game information

First quarter

- SIU – Keontez Lewis 37-yard pass from D. J. Williams (Paul Geelen kick), 10:44. Salukis 7–0. Drive: 8 plays, 85 yards, 3:07.
- UIW – 4:19 Logan Compton 1-yard pass from Zach Calzada (Brack Peacock kick), 4:19. Tied 7–7. Drive: 13 plays, 75 yards, 6:25.
- SIU – 2:37 Shaun Lester Jr. 10-yard run (Paul Geelen kick), 2:37. Salukis 14–7. Drive: 3 plays, 63 yards, 1:34.

Second quarter

- SIU – 12:52 D. J. Williams 28-yard run (Paul Geelen kick), 12:52. Salukis 21–7. Drive: 6 plays, 63 yards, 1:14.
- UIW – 4:38 Jalen Walthall 40-yard pass from Zach Calzada (Brack Peacock kick), 4:38. Salukis 21–14. Drive: 1 play, 40 yards, 0:34.
- SIU – 2:06 Keontez Lewis 57-yard run (Paul Geelen kick), 2:06. Salukis 28–14. Drive: 6 plays, 79 yards, 1:38.
- SIU – 0:00 Ryan Schwendeman 1-yard pass from D. J. Williams (Paul Geelen kick), 0:00. Salukis 35–14. Drive: 9 plays, 83 yards, 0:44.

Third quarter

- No scoring plays

Fourth quarter

- UIW – 14:44 Zach Calzada 23-yard run (Brack Peacock kick), 14:44. Salukis 35–21. Drive: 10 plays, 94 yards, 2:30.
- UIW – 5:03 Jalen Walthall 25-yard pass from Zach Calzada (Brack Peacock kick), 5:03. Salukis 35–28. Drive: 8 plays, 78 yards, 2:53.

Statistics	UIW	SIU
First downs	25	23
Total yards	437	543
Rushing yards	71	207
Passing yards	366	336
Turnovers	1	1
Time of possession	30:39	29:51

Team	Category	Player	Statistics
Incarnate Word	Passing	Zach Calzada	35/54, 366 yards, 3 TD, INT
Incarnate Word	Rushing	Dekalon Taylor	8 rushes, 32 yards
Incarnate Word	Receiving	Roy Alexander	10 receptions, 117 yards
Southern Illinois	Passing	D. J. Williams	19/27, 301 yards, 2 TD, INT
Southern Illinois	Rushing	D. J. Williams	12 rushes, 79 yards, TD
Southern Illinois	Receiving	Keontez Lewis	8 receptions, 148 yards, TD

=== No. 21 Southeast Missouri State ===
Game Four – No. 21 Southeast Missouri State Redhawks (2–1) vs No. 7 Southern Illinois Salukis (2–1) – Game summary

Quarter	1	2	3	4	Total
No. 21 Redhawks	13	3	8	14	38
No. 7 Salukis	2	10	9	0	21

at Saluki Stadium • Carbondale, IL

- Date: September 21, 2024
- Game time: 6:00 p.m. CST
- Game weather: Cloudy, 86 °F (30 °C)
- Game attendance: 13,421
- Referee: Jason Berg
- TV: ESPN+

Game information

First quarter

- (8:59) SEMO – Kyron Downing 12 yard pass from Paxton DeLaurent, DC Pippin kick blocked (Drive: 7 plays, 34 yards, 0:57; SEMO 6-0)
- (8:59) SIU – Stephen Green 89 yard PAT return (SEMO 6-2)
- (2:06) SEMO – Dorian Anderson 19 yard pass from Paxton DeLaurent, DC Pippin kick (Drive: 7 plays, 80 yards, 3:34; SEMO 13-2)

Second quarter

- (8:25) SIU – Vinson Davis III 11 yard pass from Hunter Simmons, Paul Geelen kick (Drive: 12 plays, 69 yards, 6:08; SEMO 13-9)
- (1:45) SIU – Paul Geelen 38 yard field goal (Drive: 11 plays, 66 yards, 3:45; SEMO 13–12)
- (0:07) SEMO – DC Pippin 43 yard field goal (Drive: 8 plays, 41 yards, 1:30; SEMO 16–12)

Third quarter

- (8:32) SIU – Paul Geelen 34 yard field goal (Drive: 11 plays, 43 yards, 5:22; SEMO 16–15)
- (2:06) SIU – Willtrell Hartson 3 yard run (Drive: 7 plays, 48 yards, 2:52; SIU 16-21)
- (1:16) SEMO – Dorian Anderson 19 yard pass from Paxton DeLaurent, Tristan Smith pass (Drive: 4 plays, 71 yards, 0:43; SEMO 24-21)

Fourth quarter

- (11:58) SEMO – Mitchell Sellers 3 yard pass from Paxton DeLaurent, DC Pippin kick (Drive: 8 plays, 46 yards, 3:08; SEMO 31-21)
- (11:58) SEMO – Payton Brown 1 yard run, DC Pippin kick (Drive: 11 plays, 66 yards, 6:22; SEMO 38-21)

Statistics	SEMO	SIU
First downs	22	24
Total yards	449	403
Rushing yards	148	62
Passing yards	301	341
Passing: Comp–Att–Int	25-41-1	28-48-0
Time of possession	26:01	33:59

Team	Category	Player	Statistics
Southeast Missouri State	Passing	Paxton DeLaurent	25/40, 301 yards, 4 TD, 1 INT
Southeast Missouri State	Rushing	Payton Brown	18 carries, 124 yards, 1 TD
Southeast Missouri State	Receiving	Dorian Anderson	8 receptions, 111 yards, 2 TD
Southern Illinois	Passing	Hunter Simmons	28/48, 341 yards, 1 TD
Southern Illinois	Rushing	Jerrian Parker	15 carries, 32 yards
Southern Illinois	Receiving	Vinson Davis III	9 receptions, 132 yards, 1 TD

=== at No. 5 South Dakota ===
Game Five – No. 17 Southern Illinois Salukis (2–2) vs No. 5 South Dakota Coyotes (2–1) – Game summary

Quarter	1	2	3	4	Total
No. 17 Salukis	0	7	6	0	13
No. 5 Coyotes	14	21	0	7	42

at DakotaDome • Vermillion, SD

- Date: September 28, 2024
- Game time: 1:00 p.m. CST
- Game weather: None (played indoors)
- Game attendance: 6,706
- TV: ESPN+

Game information

First quarter
Second quarter
Third quarter
Fourth quarter

Statistics	SIU	SDAK
First downs	16	24
Total yards	366	549
Rushing yards	60	302
Passing yards	306	247
Passing: Comp–Att–Int	23-41	11-17
Time of possession	24:41	35:19

Team	Category	Player	Statistics
Southern Illinois	Passing	Hunter Simmons	23-41, 306 yards, 2 TD
Southern Illinois	Rushing	Shaun Lester Jr	10 carries, 31 yards
Southern Illinois	Receiving	Keontez Lewis	3 catches, 88 yards, TD
South Dakota	Passing	Aidan Bouman	11-17, 245 yards, 2 TD
South Dakota	Rushing	Travis Theis	25 carries, 147 yards, 2 TD
South Dakota	Receiving	JJ Galbreath	2 catches, 100 yards, TD

=== No. 19 Illinois State ===
Game Six – No. 19 Illinois State Redbirds (3–2) vs No. 18 Southern Illinois Salukis (2–3) – Game summary

Quarter	1	2	3	4	Total
No. 19 Redbirds	0	0	0	0	0
No. 18 Salukis	0	0	0	0	0

at Saluki Stadium • Carbondale, IL

- Date: October 5, 2024
- Game time: 6:00 p.m. CST
- Game weather: 0 °F (−18 °C)
- TV: ESPN+

Game information

First quarter
Second quarter
Third quarter
Fourth quarter

Statistics	ILST	SIU
First downs		
Total yards		
Rushing yards		
Passing yards		
Passing: Comp–Att–Int		
Time of possession		

Team	Category	Player	Statistics
Illinois State	Passing		
Illinois State	Rushing		
Illinois State	Receiving		
Southern Illinois	Passing		
Southern Illinois	Rushing		
Southern Illinois	Receiving		

=== No. 2 North Dakota State ===
Game Seven – No. 2 North Dakota State Bison (5–1) vs Southern Illinois Salukis (2–4) – Game summary

Quarter	1	2	3	4	Total
No. 2 Bison	7	7	3	7	24
Salukis	0	3	0	0	3

at Saluki Stadium • Carbondale, IL

- Date: October 12, 2024
- Game time: 2:00 p.m. CST
- Game weather: Cloudy • Temperature: 82 °F (28 °C) • Wind: NE at 7 miles per hour (11 km/h)
- Game attendance: 9,610
- Referee: David Hergert
- TV: ESPN+

Game information

First quarter

- (6:55) NDSU – Barika Kpeenu 6-yard run, Griffin Crosa kick (Drive: 7 plays, 76 yards, 3:47; North Dakota State 7–0)

Second quarter

- (5:17) SIU – Paul Geelen 50-yard field goal (Drive: 9 plays, 42 yards, 5:34; North Dakota State 7–3)
- (0:31) NDSU – Chris Harris 11-yard pass from Cam Miller, Griffin Crosa kick (Drive: 14 plays, 75 yards, 4:46; North Dakota State 14–3)

Third quarter

- (5:49) NDSU – Griffin Crosa 34-yard field goal (Drive: 9 plays, 52 yards, 4:26; North Dakota State 17–3)

Fourth quarter

- (4:09) NDSU – CharMar Brown 9-yard run, Griffin Crosa kick (Drive: 11 plays, 87 yards, 7:03; North Dakota State 24–3)

Statistics	NDSU	SIU
First downs	22	14
Total yards	363	187
Rushing yards	163	35
Passing yards	200	152
Passing: Comp–Att–Int	19–25–0	15–27–1
Time of possession	35:29	24:31

Team	Category	Player	Statistics
North Dakota State	Passing	Cam Miller	18/24, 193 yards, TD
North Dakota State	Rushing	CharMar Brown	20 carries, 95 yards, TD
North Dakota State	Receiving	Bryce Lance	5 receptions, 63 yards
Southern Illinois	Passing	Jake Curry	15/27, 152 yards, INT
Southern Illinois	Rushing	Keontez Lewis	2 carries, 20 yards
Southern Illinois	Receiving	Allen Middleton	5 receptions, 60 yards

=== at Indiana State ===
Game Eight – Southern Illinois Salukis (2–5) vs Indiana State Sycamores (2–5) – Game summary

Quarter	1	2	3	4	Total
Salukis	0	0	0	0	0
Sycamores	0	0	0	0	0

at Memorial Stadium • Terre Haute, IN

- Date: October 26, 2024
- Game time: 12:00 p.m. CST
- Game weather: 0 °F (−18 °C)
- TV: ESPN+

Game information

First quarter
Second quarter
Third quarter
Fourth quarter

Statistics	SIU	INST
First downs		
Total yards		
Rushing yards		
Passing yards		
Passing: Comp–Att–Int		
Time of possession		

Team	Category	Player	Statistics
Southern Illinois	Passing		
Southern Illinois	Rushing		
Southern Illinois	Receiving		
Indiana State	Passing		
Indiana State	Rushing		
Indiana State	Receiving		

=== at Missouri State ===
Game Nine – Southern Illinois Salukis (2–6) at Missouri State Bears (6–2) – Game summary

Quarter	1	2	3	4	Total
Salukis	0	0	0	0	0
Bears	0	0	0	0	0

at Robert W. Plaster Stadium, Springfield, MO

- Date: November 2, 2024
- Game time: 2:00 p.m. CST
- TV announcers (ESPN+): TBD

Game information

First quarter
Second quarter
Third quarter
Fourth quarter

Statistics	SIU	MOST
First downs		
Total yards		
Rushing yards		
Passing yards		
Passing: Comp–Att–Int		
Time of possession		

Team	Category	Player	Statistics
Southern Illinois	Passing		
Southern Illinois	Rushing		
Southern Illinois	Receiving		
Missouri State	Passing		
Missouri State	Rushing		
Missouri State	Receiving		

=== Youngstown State ===
Game Ten – Youngstown State Penguins (3–7) vs Southern Illinois Salukis (2–7) – Game summary

Quarter	1	2	3	4	Total
Penguins	14	16	3	0	33
Salukis	0	12	6	19	37

at Saluki Stadium • Carbondale, IL

- Date: November 9, 2024
- Game time: 12:00 p.m. CST
- Game weather: Sunny • Temperature: 58 °F (14 °C) • Wind: SW at 8 miles per hour (13 km/h)
- Game attendance: 4,933
- Referee: Jason Perkins
- TV announcers (ESPN+): Drae Smith (play-by-play) and Chris Sammarone (analyst)

Game information

First quarter

- (12:18) YSU – Beau Brungard 3-yard run, Andrew Lastovka kick (Drive: 6 plays, 66 yards, 2:32; YSU 7–0)
- (3:43) YSU – Beau Brungard 27-yard run, Andrew Lastovka kick (Drive: 7 plays, 46 yards, 4:30; YSU 14–0)

Second quarter

- (10:21) YSU – Beau Brungard 26-yard run, Andrew Lastovka kick (Drive: 11 plays, 80 yards, 6:12; YSU 21–0)
- (3:59) YSU – Tyshon King 3-yard pass from Beau Brungard, Andrew Lastovka kick (Drive: 6 plays, 61 yards, 3:25; YSU 28–0)
- (2:12) SIU – Jake Curry 6-yard run, two-point conversion failed (Drive: 4 plays, 75 yards, 1:47; YSU 28–6)
- (0:16) SIU – Allen Middleton 20-yard pass from Jake Curry, two-point conversion failed (Drive: 3 plays, 75 yards, 0:22; YSU 28–12)
- (0:16) YSU – Michael Well 96-yard defensive two-point conversion return (YSU 30–12)

Third quarter

- (9:13) SIU – Jimmy Athans 3-yard run, two-point conversion failed (Drive: 8 plays, 77 yards, 2:57; YSU 30–18)
- (2:45) YSU – Andrew Lastovka 38-yard field goal (Drive: 9 plays, 60 yards, 3:13; YSU 33–18)

Fourth quarter

- (14:15) SIU – Jerrian Parker 1-yard run, Paul Geelen kick (Drive: 9 plays, 75 yards, 3:30; YSU 33–25)
- (2:59) SIU – Colton Hoag 18-yard pass from Jake Curry, two-point conversion failed (Drive: 5 plays, 66 yards, 1:24; YSU 33–31)
- (1:04) SIU – Bradley Clark 20-yard pass from Jake Curry, two-point conversion failed (Drive: 3 plays, 65 yards, 0:39; SIU 37–33)

Statistics	YSU	SIU
First downs	24	24
Total yards	478	488
Rushing yards	212	166
Passing yards	266	322
Passing: Comp–Att–Int	18–31–2	19–26–1
Time of possession	38:02	21:58

Team	Category	Player	Statistics
Youngstown State	Passing	Beau Brungard	18/31, 266 yards, TD, 2 INT
Youngstown State	Rushing	Beau Brungard	22 carries, 121 yards, 3 TD
Youngstown State	Receiving	Max Tomczak	9 receptions, 154 yards
Southern Illinois	Passing	Jake Curry	19/26, 322 yards, 3 TD, INT
Southern Illinois	Rushing	Jake Curry	10 carries, 78 yards, TD
Southern Illinois	Receiving	Allen Middleton	7 receptions, 102 yards, TD

=== at No. 3 South Dakota State ===
Game Eleven – Southern Illinois Salukis (3–7) at No. 3 South Dakota State Jackrabbits (8–2) – Game summary

Quarter	1	2	3	4	Total
Salukis	0	0	7	3	10
No. 3 Jackrabbits	3	28	10	0	41

at Dana J. Dykhouse Stadium, Brookings, SD

- Date: November 16, 2024
- Game time: 2:00 p.m. CST
- Game weather: 56 °F (13 °C), Sunny, Wind NW 20 mph (32 km/h)
- Game attendance: 17,268
- Referee: Gregory Gompf
- TV announcers (ESPN+): TBD

Game information

First quarter
Second quarter
Third quarter
Fourth quarter

Statistics	SIU	SDST
First downs		
Total yards		
Rushing yards		
Passing yards		
Passing: Comp–Att–Int		
Time of possession		

Team	Category	Player	Statistics
Southern Illinois	Passing		
Southern Illinois	Rushing		
Southern Illinois	Receiving		
South Dakota State	Passing		
South Dakota State	Rushing		
South Dakota State	Receiving		

=== Murray State ===
Murray State Racers at Southern Illinois Salukis – Game summary

Quarter	1	2	3	4	Total
Racers	0	0	0	0	0
Salukis	13	28	14	7	62

at Saluki Stadium, Carbondale, Illinois

- Date: November 23
- Game time: 12:00 p.m. CST
- Game weather: Cloudy, 51 °F (11 °C)
- Game attendance: 5,310
- Referee: Tyler Downs
- TV: ESPN+
- Box score, Recap

Game information
First quarter
- SIU – Paul Geelen 47-yard field goal, 7:33. Salukis 3–0. Drive: 6 plays, 57 yards, 2:26.
- SIU – Paul Geelen 39-yard field goal, 4:52. Salukis 6–0. Drive: 5 plays, 21 yards, 0:55.
- SIU – Bradley Clark 35-yard pass from Michael Lindauer (Paul Geelen kick), 1:30. Salukis 13–0. Drive: 1 play, 35 yards, 0:08.

Second quarter

- SIU – Keontez Lewis 4-yard pass from Michael Lindauer (Paul Geelen kick), 10:05. Salukis 20–0. Drive: 11 plays, 67 yards, 4:35.
- SIU – Nah'shawn Hezekiah 19-yard pass from Michael Lindauer (Paul Geelen kick), 8:02. Salukis 27–0. Drive: 3 plays, 38 yards, 1:19.
- SIU – Nah'shawn Hezekiah 35-yard pass from Michael Lindauer (Paul Geelen kick), 1:25. Salukis 34–0. Drive: 10 plays, 81 yards, 4:32.
- SIU – Keontez Lewis 65-yard pass from Michael Lindauer (Paul Geelen kick), 0:42. Salukis 41–0. Drive: 1 play, 65 yards, 0:09.

Third quarter

- SIU – Bradley Clark 23-yard pass from Michael Lindauer (Paul Geelen kick), 7:56. Salukis 48–0. Drive: 11 plays, 65 yards, 5:44.
- SIU – Jay Jones 1-yard pass from Michael Lindauer (Paul Geelen kick), 3:11. Salukis 55–0. Drive: 4 plays, 44 yards, 1:48.

Fourth quarter

- SIU – Jeremiah Baxter 5-yard run (Paul Geelen kick), 8:41. Salukis 62–0. Drive: 10 plays, 48 yards, 5:31.

Statistics	MURR	SIU
First downs	9	25
Total yards	185	529
Rushing yards	75	246
Passing yards	110	283
Turnovers	5	0
Time of possession	25:58	34:02

Team	Category	Player	Statistics
Murray State	Passing	Jayden Johannsen	7/11, 80 yards, 2 INT
Murray State	Rushing	Kywon Morgan	6 rushes, 32 yards
Murray State	Receiving	J. K. Carter	4 receptions, 62 yards
Southern Illinois	Passing	Michael Lindauer	20/33, 283 yards, 7 TD
Southern Illinois	Rushing	Allen Middleton	15 rushes, 124 yards
Southern Illinois	Receiving	Keontez Lewis	5 receptions, 104 yards, 2 TD
