= 2024 Missouri Valley Football Conference season =

American college football conference season

- League: NCAA Division I Football Championship Subdivision
- Sport: Football
- Duration: August 29, 2024 through January 6, 2025
- Teams: 11
- TV partner(s): ESPN College Football, ESPN+, Local TV partners

2025 NFL draft
- Top draft pick: Grey Zabel, G, North Dakota State
- Picked by: Seattle Seahawks (round 1, pick 18)

Regular season
- Champions Playoff participants: North Dakota State; South Dakota State; South Dakota Illinois State

Football seasons
- 2023 2025

2024 Missouri Valley Football Conference standings
	Conf.			Overall
Team	W		L	W		L
No. 1 North Dakota State +^	7	–	1	14	–	2
No. 3 South Dakota State +^	7	–	1	12	–	3
No. 4 South Dakota +^	7	–	1	11	–	3
Missouri State *	6	–	2	8	–	4
No. 11 Illinois State ^	6	–	2	10	–	4
Youngstown State	3	–	5	4	–	8
Indiana State	3	–	5	4	–	8
North Dakota	2	–	6	5	–	7
Southern Illinois	2	–	6	4	–	8
Northern Iowa	1	–	7	3	–	9
Murray State	0	–	8	1	–	11
+ – Conference co-champions; ^ – FCS playoff participant; * – Ineligible for 2024 FCS playoffs due to transition to the FBS; Rankings from STATS Poll

The 2024 Missouri Valley Football Conference season was the 39th season of college football play for the Missouri Valley Football Conference and part of the 2024 NCAA Division I FCS football season. This was the MVFC's first season returning to 11 teams, and its fourth in the last 5 seasons. It was also the conference's last at the time as Missouri State announced before the season that they would be joining Conference USA starting in the 2025–26 academic year. The Bears were ineligible for the FCS playoffs and the conference title during the 2024 season.

North Dakota State made it to the National Championship as the 2nd seed and won their 10th FCS title in program history, and 18th title at any level, defeating Montana State. South Dakota State and South Dakota made the playoffs as the 3rd and 4th seeds and won their way to the FCS semifinals, where they would fall to North Dakota State and Montana State. Illinois State also made the playoffs as the 12th seed, and made it to the second round, losing to 5th seeded UC Davis.

== Conference changes ==
After the conclusion of the 2023 college football season, Western Illinois left the conference for the Ohio Valley Conference after 38 years in the league as a charter member. This move matches the Leathernecks departure from their main conference, the Summit League, which they left after the 2022-23 collegiate season.

== Coaching changes ==
=== Murray State ===
On January 10, 2024, Jody Wright was named the new head coach at Murray State. Wright takes over for Dean Hood, who retired after the 2023 season.

=== North Dakota State ===
On December 17, 2023, Tim Polasek was named the new head coach at North Dakota State. Polasek takes over for Matt Entz, who left the Bison for the linebackers/assistant coach position at USC.

== Preseason ==
=== League Poll ===
The annual preseason poll; voted on by conference coaches, athletic directors, and media members.

Predicted finish	Team	Points (1st place votes)
1	South Dakota State	482 (42)
2	North Dakota State	437 (1)
3	South Dakota	371
4	Southern Illinois	293
5	North Dakota	276
6	Illinois State	264
7	Youngstown State	255
8	Northern Iowa	227
9	Missouri State	164 (1)
10	Indiana State	68
11	Murray State	67

=== Individual Awards ===
Award	Player	School	Position	Year
First Team Offense	Mark Gronowski	South Dakota State	QB	Sr.
First Team Offense	Mason King	Illinois State	RB	Sr.
First Team Offense	Tyshon King	Youngstown State	RB	Sr.
First Team Offense	Hunter Brozio	North Dakota State	FB	Sr.
First Team Offense	Carter Bell	South Dakota	WR	Sr.
First Team Offense	Bo Belquist	North Dakota	WR	Sr.
First Team Offense	Dan Sobkowicz	Illinois State	WR	Jr.
First Team Offense	JJ Galbreath	South Dakota	TE	Sr.
First Team Offense	Gus Miller	South Dakota State	OL	Sr.
First Team Offense	Jared Penning	Northern Iowa	OL	Sr.
First Team Offense	Jaison Williams	Youngstown State	OL	Sr.
First Team Offense	Grey Zabel	North Dakota State	OL	Sr.
First Team Offense	Hunter Zambrano	Illinois State	OL	Sr.
First Team Defense	Jarod DePriest	South Dakota State	DL	Sr.
First Team Defense	Nick Gaes	South Dakota	DL	Sr.
First Team Defense	Dylan Hendricks	North Dakota State	DL	Sr.
First Team Defense	Eli Mostaert	North Dakota State	DL	Sr.
First Team Defense	Amir Abdullah	Illinois State	LB	Sr.
First Team Defense	Adam Bock	South Dakota State	LB	Sr.
First Team Defense	Logan Kopp	North Dakota State	LB	Jr.
First Team Defense	Garret Ollendieck	Indiana State	LB	Sr.
First Team Defense	Dalys Beanum	South Dakota State	DB	Sr.
First Team Defense	Maddix Blackwell	Indiana State	DB	Jr.
First Team Defense	Tucker Large	South Dakota State	DB	Jr.
First Team Defense	Dennis Shorter	South Dakota	DB	Sr.
First Team Defense	Cole Wisniewski	North Dakota State	DB	Sr.
First Team Special Teams	Hunter Brozio	North Dakota State	LS	Sr.
First Team Special Teams	Will Leyland	South Dakota	PK	Jr.
First Team Special Teams	Grant Burkett	Missouri State	P	Sr.
First Team Special Teams	Carter Bell	South Dakota	RS	Sr.
First Team Special Teams	Amar Johnson	South Dakota State	AP	Sr.

Award	Player	School	Position	Year
Second Team Offense	Cam Miller	North Dakota State	QB	Sr.
Second Team Offense	Amar Johnson	South Dakota State	RB	Jr.
Second Team Offense	Travis Theis	South Dakota	RB	Sr.
Second Team Offense	Jaden Norby	North Dakota	FB	Sr.
Second Team Offense	Vinson Davis III	Southern Illinois	WR	Jr.
Second Team Offense	Max Tomczak	Youngstown State	WR	Jr.
Second Team Offense	Griffin Wilde	South Dakota State	WR	So.
Second Team Offense	Joe Stoffel	North Dakota State	TE	Sr.
Second Team Offense	Evan Beernten	South Dakota State	OL	Sr.
Second Team Offense	Joe Cotton	South Dakota	OL	So.
Second Team Offense	Chase Evans	Southern Illinois	OL	Sr.
Second Team Offense	Joe Lombard	South Dakota	OL	Sr.
Second Team Offense	Mason Miller	North Dakota State	OL	Jr.
Second Team Defense	Jake Anderson	Illinois State	DL	So.
Second Team Defense	Cannon Butler	Northern Iowa	DL	Jr.
Second Team Defense	Blake Holden	South Dakota	DL	Sr.
Second Team Defense	Darion Smith	Missouri State	DL	Sr.
Second Team Defense	Colin Bohanek	Southern Illinois	LB	Sr.
Second Team Defense	Tucker Langenberg	Northern Iowa	LB	Jr.
Second Team Defense	Tye Niekamp	Illinois State	LB	So.
Second Team Defense	Wyatt Pedigo	North Dakota	LB	Sr.
Second Team Defense	PJ Hall	Missouri State	DB	Sr.
Second Team Defense	Keondre Jackson	Illinois State	DB	Sr.
Second Team Defense	Todric McGee	Missouri State	DB	Jr.
Second Team Defense	Cale Reeder	South Dakota State	DB	Sr.
Second Team Defense	Ubayd Steed	Southern Illinois	DB	Sr.
Second Team Special Teams	Kaydon Olivia	South Dakota State	LS	Jr.
Second Team Special Teams	Griffin Crosa	North Dakota State	PK	Sr.
Second Team Special Teams	Hunter Dustman	South Dakota State	P	Sr.
Second Team Special Teams	Tucker Large	South Dakota State	RS	Jr.
Second Team Special Teams	Vinson Davis III	Southern Illinois	AP	Jr.

== Rankings ==
Legend
	Improvement in ranking
	Drop in ranking
	Not ranked previous week
	No change in ranking from previous week
RV	Received votes but were not ranked in Top 25 of poll
т	Tied with team above or below also with this symbol

		Pre	Wk 1	Wk 2	Wk 3	Wk 4	Wk 5	Wk 6	Wk 7	Wk 8	Wk 9	Wk 10	Wk 11	Wk 12	Wk 13	Final
Illinois State	STATS	19	21	18	17	18	18	16	21	21	21	18	17	14	11	11
Illinois State	Coaches	20	22	19	15	15	19	16	23	20	19	17	16	13	10	10
Indiana State	STATS															
Indiana State	Coaches	RV	RV	RV	RV	RV			RV			RV				
Missouri State	STATS															
Missouri State	Coaches	RV	RV	RV		RV	RV	25	20	18	17	15	14	18	21	
Murray State	STATS															
Murray State	Coaches	RV	RV		RV	RV	RV									
North Dakota	STATS	24	23	10	10	9	7	9	9	7	15	21	RV			
North Dakota	Coaches	22	20	10	9	8	6	10	10	7	15	23	RV	RV		
North Dakota State	STATS	2	2	2	2	2	2	2	2	1	1	1	1	1	3	1
North Dakota State	Coaches	2	2	2	2	2	2	2	2	1	1	1	1	1	4	1
Northern Iowa	STATS	RV	RV	RV	25	RV	RV									
Northern Iowa	Coaches	RV	RV	21	19	19	18	RV								
South Dakota	STATS	5	6	6	6	5	4	4	4	4	5	5	5	4	4	4
South Dakota	Coaches	5	6	6	6	5	4	4	4	4	5	5	5	4	3	4
South Dakota State	STATS	1	1	1	1	1	1	1	1	3	3	3	3	3	2	3
South Dakota State	Coaches	1	1	1	1	1	1	1	1	3	3	3	3	3	2	3
Southern Illinois	STATS	10	10	9	7	17	19	RV								
Southern Illinois	Coaches	11	12	8	7	17	23	RV								
Youngstown State	STATS	25	25	21	RV											
Youngstown State	Coaches	23	23	20	25	RV										

== Schedule ==
Index to colors and formatting
MVFC member won
MVFC member lost
MVFC teams in **bold**

All times Central time.

† denotes Homecoming game
^ denotes AP Poll ranking for FBS teams

=== Regular season schedule ===
==== Week 1 ====
Date	Time	Visiting team	Home team	Site	TV	Result	Attendance	Ref.
August 29	6:00 PM	No. 25 **Youngstown State**	No. 6 Villanova	Villanova Stadium • Villanova, PA	FloSports	**L** 17–24	5,421	
August 29	7:00 PM	No. 2 **North Dakota State**	Colorado	Folsom Field • Boulder, CO	ESPN	**L** 26–31	49,438	
August 29	7:00 PM	Northern State	No. 5 **South Dakota**	DakotaDome • Vermillion, SD	ESPN+	**W** 45–3	7,435	
August 29	7:00 PM	**Murray State**	No. 11^ Missouri	Faurot Field • Columbia, MO	SEC Network/ESPN+	**L** 0–51	62,621	
August 31	11:00 AM	No. 19 **Illinois State**	No. 25^ Iowa	Kinnick Stadium • Iowa City, IA	BTN	**L** 0–40	69,250	
August 31	11:00 AM	**Indiana State**	Purdue	Ross–Ade Stadium • West Lafayette, IN	BTN	**L** 0–49	59,488	
August 31	1:00 PM	No. 1 **South Dakota State**	No. 17^ Oklahoma State	Boone Pickens Stadium • Stillwater, OK	ESPN+	**L** 20–44	52,202	
August 31	2:30 PM	No. 24 **North Dakota**	Iowa State	Jack Trice Stadium • Ames, IA	FS1	**L** 3–21	56,148	
August 31	4:00 PM	Valparaiso	No. RV **Northern Iowa**	UNI-Dome • Cedar Falls, IA	ESPN+	**W** 35–7	8,458	
August 31	7:00 PM	No. 10 **Southern Illinois**	BYU	LaVell Edwards Stadium • Provo, UT	ESPN+	**L** 13–41	63,712	
August 31	8:00 PM	**Missouri State**	No. 3 Montana	Washington-Grizzly Stadium • Missoula, MT	ESPN+	**L** 24–29	26,482	
^{#}Rankings from Stats Perform. All times are in Central Time.

==== Week 2 ====
Date	Time	Visiting team	Home team	Site	TV	Result	Attendance	Ref.
September 7	1:00 PM	No. RV **Northern Iowa**	St. Thomas	O'Shaughnessy Stadium • St. Paul, MN		**W** 17–10	N/A	
September 7	1:00 PM	Valparaiso	No. 25 **Youngstown State**	Stambaugh Stadium • Youngstown, OH	ESPN+	**W** 59–25	7,649	
September 7	2:00 PM	**Missouri State**	Ball State	Scheumann Stadium • Muncie, IN	ESPN+	**L** 34–42	10,018	
September 7	2:30 PM	Tennessee State	No. 2 **North Dakota State**	Fargodome • Fargo, ND	ESPN+	**W** 52–3	16,811	
September 7	2:30 PM	No. 6 **South Dakota**	Wisconsin	Camp Randall Stadium • Madison, WI	FS1	**L** 13–27	76,069	
September 7	6:00 PM	No. 21 **Illinois State**	North Alabama	Braly Municipal Stadium • Florence, AL		**W** 24–17	8,014	
September 7	6:00 PM	**Indiana State**	Eastern Illinois	O'Brien Field • Charleston, IL	ESPN+	**L** 20–27	7,222	
September 7	6:00 PM	No. 10 **Southern Illinois**	Austin Peay	Fortera Stadium • Clarksville, TN	ESPN+	**W** 31–17	8,124	
September 7	6:00 PM	No. 4 Montana	No. 23 **North Dakota**	Alerus Center • Grand Forks, ND	ESPN+	**W** 27–24	11,595	
September 7	6:00 PM	Butler	**Murray State**	Roy Stewart Stadium • Murray, KY	ESPN+	**L** 17–19	7,213	
September 7	6:00 PM	No. 12 Incarnate Word	No. 1 **South Dakota State**	Dana J. Dykhouse Stadium • Brookings, SD	ESPN+	**W** 45–24	19,321	
^{#}Rankings from Stats Perform. All times are in Central Time.

==== Week 3 ====
Date	Time	Visiting team	Home team	Site	TV	Result	Attendance	Ref.
September 14	12:00 PM	Western Illinois	No. 18 **Illinois State**	Hancock Stadium • Normal, IL	ESPN+	**W** 51–34	N/A	
September 14	1:00 PM	Duquesne	No. 21 **Youngstown State**	Stambaugh Stadium • Youngstown, OH	ESPN+	**L** 25–28	12,415	
September 14	1:00 PM	Idaho State	No. 10 **North Dakota**	Alerus Center • Grand Forks, ND	ESPN+	**W** 52–28	10,685	
September 14	3:00 PM	No. 6 **South Dakota**	Portland State	Hillsboro Stadium • Portland, OR	ESPN+	Cancelled		
September 14	4:30 PM	No. 2 **North Dakota State**	East Tennessee State	William B. Greene Jr. Stadium • Johnson City, TN	ESPN+	**W** 38–35	11,040	
September 14	5:00 PM	Dayton	**Indiana State**	Memorial Stadium • Terre Haute, IN	ESPN+	**W** 24–13	3,614	
September 14	6:00 PM	Mississippi Valley State	**Murray State**	Roy Stewart Stadium • Murray, KY	ESPN+	**W** 59–8	9,088	
September 14	6:00 PM	Lindenwood	**Missouri State**	Robert W. Plaster Stadium • Springfield, MO	ESPN+	**W** 28–14	9,642	
September 14	6:00 PM	No. 12 Incarnate Word	No. 9 **Southern Illinois**	Saluki Stadium • Carbondale, IL	ESPN+	**W** 35–28	7,879	
September 14	6:00 PM	Augustana (SD)	No. 1 **South Dakota State**	Dana J. Dykhouse Stadium • Brookings, SD	ESPN+	**W** 24–3	19,376	
September 14	6:30 PM	No. RV **Northern Iowa**	No. 23^ Nebraska	Memorial Stadium • Lincoln, NE	BTN	**L** 3–34	86,546	
^{#}Rankings from Stats Perform. All times are in Central Time.

==== Week 4 ====
Date	Time	Visiting team	Home team	Site	TV	Result	Attendance	Ref.
September 21	1:00 PM	San Diego	No. 10 **North Dakota**	Alerus Center • Grand Forks, ND	ESPN+	**W** 41–24	8,491	
September 21	1:00 PM	No. RV Towson	No. 2 **North Dakota State**†	Fargodome • Fargo, ND	ESPN+	**W** 41–24	17,185	
September 21	1:00 PM	Drake	No. 6 **South Dakota**	DakotaDome • Vermillion, SD	ESPN+	**W** 42–3	6,529	
September 21	2:30 PM	No. RV **Youngstown State**	No. RV^ Pitt	Acrisure Stadium • Pittsburgh, PA	ACC Network	**L** 17–73	48,437	
September 21	6:00 PM	No. RV Eastern Illinois	No. 17 **Illinois State**	Hancock Stadium • Normal, IL	ESPN+	**W** 31–7	9,012	
September 21	6:00 PM	No. 21 Southeast Missouri State	No. 7 **Southern Illinois**	Saluki Stadium • Carbondale, IL	ESPN+	**L** 21–38	13,421	
September 21	6:00 PM	No. 1 **South Dakota State**	Southeastern Louisiana	Strawberry Stadium • Hammond, LA		**W** 41–0	4,387	
September 21	6:00 PM	**Missouri State**	UT Martin	Graham Stadium • Martin, TN	ESPN+	**W** 31–24	3,985	
September 21	11:00 PM	No. 25 **Northern Iowa**	Hawaii	Clarence T. C. Ching Athletics Complex • Honolulu, HI		**L** 7–36	11,402	
^{#}Rankings from Stats Perform. All times are in Central Time.

Date	Bye week	
September 21	Indiana State	Murray State

==== Week 5 ====
Date	Time	Visiting team	Home team	Site	TV	Result	Attendance	Ref.
September 28	12:00 PM	Houston Christian	**Indiana State**	Memorial Stadium • Terre Haute, IN	ESPN+	**L** 24–27	3,466	
September 28	1:00 PM	**Murray State**	No. 9 **North Dakota**	Alerus Center • Grand Forks, ND	ESPN+	**UND** 72–35	10,828	
September 28	1:00 PM	No. 17 **Southern Illinois**	No. 5 **South Dakota**	DakotaDome • Vermillion, SD	ESPN+	**USD** 42–13	6,706	
September 28	2:00 PM	**Youngstown State**	**Missouri State**	Robert W. Plaster Stadium • Springfield, MO	ESPN+	**MOST** 38–31	12,117	
September 28	2:00 PM	No. 2 **North Dakota State**	No. 18 **Illinois State**†	Hancock Stadium • Normal, IL	ESPN+	**NDSU** 42–10	11,687	
^{#}Rankings from Stats Perform. All times are in Central Time.

Date	Bye week	
September 28	No. 1 South Dakota State	No. RV Northern Iowa

==== Week 6 ====
Date	Time	Visiting team	Home team	Site	TV	Result	Attendance	Ref.
October 5	1:00 PM	**Indiana State**	**Youngstown State**	Stambaugh Stadium • Youngstown, OH	ESPN+	**YSU** 21–14	8,202	
October 5	2:00 PM	No. 4 **South Dakota**	**Murray State**	Roy Stewart Stadium • Murray, KY	ESPN+	**USD** 59–0	6,437	
October 5	2:30 PM	No. 7 **North Dakota**	No. 2 **North Dakota State**	Fargodome • Fargo, ND	ESPN+	**NDSU** 41–17	18,723	
October 5	4:00 PM	No. 1 **South Dakota State**	No. RV **Northern Iowa**	UNI-Dome • Cedar Falls, IA	ESPN+	**SDSU** 41–3	12,611	
October 5	6:00 PM	No. 18 **Illinois State**	No. 19 **Southern Illinois**	Saluki Stadium • Carbondale, IL	ESPN+	**ILST** 45–10	7,157	
^{#}Rankings from Stats Perform. All times are in Central Time.

Date	Bye week
October 5	Missouri State

==== Week 7 ====
Date	Time	Visiting team	Home team	Site	TV	Result	Attendance	Ref.
October 12	12:00 PM	**Missouri State**	No. 16 **Illinois State**	Hancock Stadium • Normal, IL	ESPN+	**MOST** 41–7	6,232	
October 12	12:00 PM	**Murray State**	**Indiana State**	Memorial Stadium • Terre Haute, IN	ESPN+	**INST** 31–27	3,056	
October 12	2:00 PM	No. 2 **North Dakota State**	No. RV **Southern Illinois**†	Saluki Stadium • Carbondale, IL	ESPN+	**NDSU** 24–3	9,610	
October 12	2:00 PM	**Northern Iowa**	No. 4 **South Dakota**	DakotaDome • Vermillion, SD	ESPN+	**USD** 42–17	8,934	
October 12	2:00 PM	**Youngstown State**	No. 1 **South Dakota State**	Dana J. Dykhouse Stadium • Brookings, SD	ESPN+	**SDSU** 63–13	19,331	
^{#}Rankings from Stats Perform. All times are in Central Time.

Date	Bye week
October 12	No. 9 North Dakota

==== Week 8 ====
Date	Time	Visiting team	Home team	Site	TV	Result	Attendance	Ref.
October 19	1:00 PM	**Northern Iowa**	No. 9 **North Dakota**	Alerus Center • Grand Forks, ND	ESPN+	**UND** 31–7	11,617	
October 19	2:00 PM	No. 21 **Illinois State**	**Murray State**	Roy Stewart Stadium • Murray, KY	ESPN+	**ILST** 40–32	15,991	
October 19	2:00 PM	**Indiana State**	**Missouri State**†	Robert W. Plaster Stadium • Springfield, MO	ESPN+	**MOST** 46–21	11,280	
October 19	5:00 PM	No. 4 **South Dakota**	**Youngstown State**	Stambaugh Stadium • Youngstown, OH	ESPN+	**USD** 27–17	8,560	
October 19	7:00 PM	No. 1 **South Dakota State**	No. 2 **North Dakota State**	Fargodome • Fargo, ND	ESPN2	**NDSU** 13–9	18,807	
^{#}Rankings from Stats Perform. All times are in Central Time.

Date	Bye week
October 19	Southern Illinois

==== Week 9 ====
Date	Time	Visiting team	Home team	Site	TV	Result	Attendance	Ref.
October 26	12:00 PM	**Southern Illinois**	**Indiana State**†	Memorial Stadium • Terre Haute, IN	ESPN+	**INST** 20–17	4,266	
October 26	1:00 PM	No. 1 **North Dakota State**	**Murray State**	Roy Stewart Stadium • Murray, KY	ESPN+	**NDSU** 59–6	6,133	
October 26	4:00 PM	**Missouri State**	**Northern Iowa**†	UNI-Dome • Cedar Falls, IA	ESPN+	**MOST** 49–42	10,848	
October 26	5:00 PM	No. 7 **North Dakota**	**Youngstown State**	Stambaugh Stadium • Youngstown, OH	ESPN+	**YSU** 41–40 ^{OT}	9,979	
October 26	6:30 PM	No. 4 **South Dakota**	No. 3 **South Dakota State**	Dana J. Dykhouse Stadium • Brookings, SD	ESPNU	**SDSU** 20–17 ^{OT}	19,351	
^{#}Rankings from Stats Perform. All times are in Central Time.

Date	Bye week
October 26	No. 21 Illinois State

==== Week 10 ====
Date	Time	Visiting team	Home team	Site	TV	Result	Attendance	Ref.
November 2	12:00 PM	No. 15 **North Dakota**	**Indiana State**	Memorial Stadium • Terre Haute, IN	ESPN+	**INST** 35–31	3,013	
November 2	2:00 PM	**Youngstown State**	No. 21 **Illinois State**	Hancock Stadium • Normal, IL	ESPN+	**ILST** 23–16	6,381	
November 2	2:00 PM	**Murray State**	No. 3 **South Dakota State**	Dana J. Dykhouse Stadium • Brookings, SD	ESPN+	**SDSU** 52–6	16,376	
November 2	2:00 PM	**Southern Illinois**	**Missouri State**	Robert W. Plaster Stadium • Springfield, MO	ESPN+	**MOST** 38–17	8,134	
November 2	2:30 PM	**Northern Iowa**	No. 1 **North Dakota State**	Fargodome • Fargo, ND	ESPN+	**NDSU** 42–19	14,528	
^{#}Rankings from Stats Perform. All times are in Central Time.

Date	Bye week
November 2	No. 5 South Dakota

==== Week 11 ====
Date	Time	Visiting team	Home team	Site	TV	Result	Attendance	Ref.
November 9	12:00 PM	**Youngstown State**	**Southern Illinois**	Saluki Stadium • Carbondale, IL	ESPN+	**SIU** 37–33	4,933	
November 9	1:00 PM	No. 3 **South Dakota State**	No. 21 **North Dakota**	Alerus Center • Grand Forks, ND	ESPN+	**SDSU** 38–7	9,797	
November 9	1:00 PM	**Missouri State**	**Murray State**	Roy Stewart Stadium • Murray, KY	ESPN+	**MOST** 59–31	5,127	
November 9	1:00 PM	No. 18 **Illinois State**	**Northern Iowa**	UNI-Dome • Cedar Falls, IA	ESPN+	**ILST** 31–9	1,880	
November 9	1:00 PM	**Indiana State**	No. 5 **South Dakota**	DakotaDome • Vermillion, SD	ESPN+	**USD** 49–0	5,515	
^{#}Rankings from Stats Perform. All times are in Central Time.

Date	Bye week
November 9	No. 1 North Dakota State

==== Week 12 ====
Date	Time	Visiting team	Home team	Site	TV	Result	Attendance	Ref.
November 16	11:00 AM	**Northern Iowa**	**Youngstown State**	Stambaugh Stadium • Youngstown, OH	ESPN+	**YSU** 39–38 ^{OT}	4,933	
November 16	12:00 PM	No. 17 **Illinois State**	**Indiana State**	Memorial Stadium • Terre Haute, IN	ESPN+	**ILST** 31–19	3,188	
November 16	12:00 PM	No. 5 **South Dakota**	No. RV **North Dakota**	Alerus Center • Grand Forks, ND	ESPN+	**USD** 42–36	8,974	
November 16	12:30 PM	**Murray State**	Kentucky	Kroger Field • Lexington, KY	SEC Network/ESPN+	**L** 6–48	48,370	
November 16	2:00 PM	**Southern Illinois**	No. 3 **South Dakota State**	Dana J. Dykhouse Stadium • Brookings, SD	ESPN+	**SDSU** 41–10	17,268	
November 16	2:30 PM	**Missouri State**	No. 1 **North Dakota State**	Fargodome • Fargo, ND	ESPN+	**NDSU** 59–21	14,679	
^{#}Rankings from Stats Perform. All times are in Central Time.

==== Week 13 ====
Date	Time	Visiting team	Home team	Site	TV	Result	Attendance	Ref.
November 23	12:00 PM	**North Dakota**	No. 14 **Illinois State**	Hancock Stadium • Normal, IL	ESPN+	**ILST** 35–13	5,631	
November 23	12:00 PM	**Murray State**	**Southern Illinois**	Saluki Stadium • Carbondale, IL	ESPN+	**SIU** 62–0	5,310	
November 23	1:00 PM	**Indiana State**	**Northern Iowa**	UNI-Dome • Cedar Falls, IA	ESPN+	**UNI** 41–34	8,398	
November 23	1:00 PM	No. 1 **North Dakota State**	No. 4 **South Dakota**	DakotaDome • Vermillion, SD	ESPN+	**USD** 29–28	9,062	
November 23	2:00 PM	No. 3 **South Dakota State**	**Missouri State**	Robert W. Plaster Stadium • Springfield, MO	ESPN+	**SDSU** 45–9	7,142	
^{#}Rankings from Stats Perform. All times are in Central Time.

Date	Bye week
November 23	Youngstown State

=== FCS playoffs ===
In 2024, four teams made the FCS playoffs. North Dakota State (No. 2), South Dakota State (No. 3), and South Dakota (No. 4) all received byes, while Illinois State (No. 12) played in the first round. Below are the games in which they played.

All times central. Seedings in parentheses.

==== First round ====
Date	Time	Visiting team	Home team	Site	TV	Result	Attendance	Ref.
November 30	11:00 AM	No. 11 (12) **Illinois State**	No. 16 Southeast Missouri State (Big South–OVC)	Houck Stadium • Cape Girardeau, MO	ESPN+	**W** 35–27		
^{#}Rankings from Stats Perform. All times are in Central Time.

==== Second round ====
Date	Time	Visiting team	Home team	Site	TV	Result	Attendance	Ref.
December 7	1:00 PM	No. 13 (14) Montana (Big Sky)	No. 2 (3) **South Dakota State**	Dana J. Dykhouse Stadium • Brookings, SD	ESPN+	**W** 35–18	10,376	
December 7	2:00 PM	No. 14 (13) Tarleton State (UAC)	No. 3 (4) **South Dakota**	DakotaDome • Vermillion, SD	ESPN+	**W** 42–31	6,231	
December 7	2:00 PM	No. 15 (15) Abilene Christian (UAC)	No. 4 (2) **North Dakota State**	Fargodome • Fargo, ND	ESPN+	**W** 51–31	10,373	
December 7	3:00 PM	No. 11 (12) **Illinois State**	No. 5 (5) UC Davis (Big Sky)	UC Davis Health Stadium • Davis, CA	ESPN+	**L** 10–42	6,317	
^{#}Rankings from Stats Perform. All times are in Central Time.

==== Quarterfinals ====
Date	Time	Visiting team	Home team	Site	TV	Result	Attendance	Ref.
December 14	11:00 AM	No. 6 (6) Incarnate Word (Southland)	No. 2 (3) **South Dakota State**	Dana J. Dykhouse Stadium • Brookings, SD	ESPN	**W** 55–14	8,671	
December 14	2:00 PM	No. 5 (5) UC Davis (Big Sky)	No. 4 (4) **South Dakota**	DakotaDome • Vermillion, SD	ESPN+	**W** 35–21	6,135	
December 14	2:30 PM	No. 8 (7) Mercer (SoCon)	No. 3 (2) **North Dakota State**	Fargodome • Fargo, ND	ABC	**W** 31–7	10,353	
^{#}Rankings from Stats Perform. All times are in Central Time.

==== Semifinals ====
Date	Time	Visiting team	Home team	Site	TV	Result	Attendance	Ref.
December 21	11:00 AM	No. 2 (3) **South Dakota State**	No. 3 (2) **North Dakota State**	Fargodome • Fargo, ND	ABC	**NDSU** 28–21	17,849	
December 21	2:30 PM	No. 4 (4) **South Dakota**	No. 1 (1) Montana State (Big Sky)	Bobcat Stadium • Bozeman, MT	ABC	**L** 17–31	20,557	
^{#}Rankings from Stats Perform. All times are in Central Time.

==== National Championship ====
Date	Time	Visiting team	Home team	Site	TV	Result	Attendance	Ref.
January 6	6:00 PM	No. 3 (2) **North Dakota State**	No. 1 (1) Montana State (Big Sky)	Toyota Stadium • Frisco, TX	ESPN	**W** 35–32	18,005	
^{#}Rankings from Stats Perform. All times are in Central Time.

== MVFC records vs other conferences ==
2024–25 records against non-conference foes:

FCS power conferences	Record
Big Sky	2–1
CAA	1–1
FCS power total	3–2
Other FCS conferences	Record
Big South–OVC	5–2
Ivy League	None
MEAC	None
Northeast	0–1
Patriot	None
PFL	6–1
SoCon	1–0
Southland	3–1
SWAC	1–0
UAC (ASUN–WAC)	2–0
Other FCS total	17–5
Other Division I opponents	Record
Football Bowl Subdivision	0–12
Total Division I	21–19
Other NCAA opponents	Record
Division II	2–0
Total non-conference record	23–19

Post season

FCS power conferences	Record
Big Sky	3–2
CAA	None
FCS power total	3–2
Other FCS conferences	Record
Big South–OVC	1–0
Ivy League	None
MEAC	None
Northeast	None
Patriot	None
PFL	None
SoCon	1–0
Southland	1–0
SWAC	None
UAC (ASUN–WAC)	2–0
Other FCS total	5–0
Total postseason record	8–2

== Awards and honors ==
=== Player of the week honors ===
Week	Offensive			Defensive			Special teams			Freshman		
Week	Player	Position	Team	Player	Position	Team	Player	Position	Team	Player	Position	Team
Week 1 (Sept. 2)	Cam Miller	QB	NDSU	Todric McGee	S	MOST	Keyondray Jones-Logan	RS	USD	Ethan Wright	RB	YSU
Week 2 (Sept. 9)	Beau Brungard	QB	YSU	Ben Bogle	LB	SIU	C.J. Elrichs	PK	UND	Elijah Owens	QB	INST
Week 3 (Sept. 16)	DJ Williams	QB	SIU	Garret Ollendieck	LB	INST	Hayden Futch	P	ILST	Keontez Lewis	WR	SIU
Week 3 (Sept. 16)	Jacob Clark	QB	MOST	Garret Ollendieck	LB	INST	Hayden Futch	P	ILST	Keontez Lewis	WR	SIU
Week 4 (Sept. 23)	Kirby Vorhees	RB	SDSU	Josh Navratil	LB	UND	Jackson Williams	WR/RS	NDSU	CharMar Brown	RB	NDSU
Week 5 (Sept. 30)	Jacob Clark	QB	MOST	Eli Mostaert	DT	NDSU	Tyler Erkman	DB	UND	CharMar Brown	RB	NDSU
Week 6 (Oct. 7)	Cam Miller	QB	NDSU	Tye Niekamp	LB	ILST	Brendon Kilpatrick	P	YSU	Quaron Adams	WR	USD
Week 7 (Oct. 14)	Jacob Clark	QB	MOST	Gary Bryant III	LB	USD	Angel Johnson	RB/KR	SDSU	Elijah Owens	QB	INST
Week 8 (Oct. 21)	Tommy Rittenhouse	QB	ILST	Logan Kopp	LB	NDSU	Kaedin Steindorf	P	NDSU	Xavier Loyd	WR	ILST
Week 9 (Oct. 28)	Beau Brungard	QB	YSU	Geoffrey Brown	LB	INST	Andrew Lastovka	PK	YSU	CharMar Brown	RB	NDSU
Week 10 (Nov. 4)	Jayden Becks	RB	MOST	Joey Shew	DE	INST	James London	PK	MUR	CharMar Brown	RB	NDSU
Week 11 (Nov. 11)	Jacob Clark	QB	MOST	Mi'Quise Humphrey-Grace	DL	USD	Hunter Dustman	K/P	SDSU	Jake Curry	QB	SIU
Week 12 (Nov. 18)	Charles Pierre Jr.	RB	USD	Matthew Durrance	S	SDSU	Griffin Crosa	K	NDSU	Xavier Loyd	WR	ILST
Week 12 (Nov. 18)	Beau Brungard	QB	YSU	Matthew Durrance	S	SDSU	Griffin Crosa	K	NDSU	Xavier Loyd	WR	ILST
Week 13 (Nov. 25)	Michael Lindauer	QB	SIU	Tye Niekamp	LB	ILST	Sergio Morancy	WR/RS	UNI	Nate Ewell	LB	USD

=== Players of the Year ===
On December 2, 2024, the Missouri Valley Football Conference released their Players of the Year and All-Conference Honors.

==== Offensive Player of the Year ====
- Cam Miller, QB (Sr - North Dakota State)

==== Defensive Player of the Year ====
- Mi'Quise Humphrey-Grace, DL (RS-So - South Dakota)

==== Newcomer and Freshman of the Year ====
- CharMar Brown, RB (RS-Fr - North Dakota State)

==== Coach of the Year ====
- Bob Nielson (South Dakota)

=== All-Conference Teams ===
Award	Player	School	Position	Year
First Team Offense	Cam Miller	North Dakota State	QB	Sr
First Team Offense	Jacob Clark	Missouri State	QB	Sr
First Team Offense	Amar Johnson	South Dakota State	RB	Sr
First Team Offense	Charles Pierre Jr.	South Dakota	RB	RS-So
First Team Offense	Travis Theis	South Dakota	FB	Sr
First Team Offense	Evan Beernsten	South Dakota State	OL	Sr
First Team Offense	Joey Lombard	South Dakota	OL	Sr
First Team Offense	Gus Miller	South Dakota State	OL	Sr
First Team Offense	Mason Miller	North Dakota State	OL	Sr
First Team Offense	Grey Zabel	North Dakota State	OL	Sr
First Team Offense	JJ Galbreath	South Dakota	TE	Sr
First Team Offense	Bo Belquist	North Dakota	WR	5th
First Team Offense	Bryce Lance	North Dakota State	WR	Jr
First Team Offense	Max Tomczak	Youngstown State	WR	Jr
First Team Defense	Jarod DePriest	South Dakota State	DL	Sr
First Team Defense	Nick Gaes	South Dakota	DL	Sr
First Team Defense	Mi'Quise Humphrey-Grace	South Dakota	DL	RS-So
First Team Defense	Eli Mostaert	North Dakota State	DL	Sr
First Team Defense	Adam Bock	South Dakota State	LB	Sr
First Team Defense	Geoffrey Brown	Indiana State	LB	Sr
First Team Defense	Caleb Francl	South Dakota State	LB	Sr
First Team Defense	Logan Kopp	North Dakota State	LB	Jr
First Team Defense	Tye Niekamp	Illinois State	LB	So
First Team Defense	Dalys Beanum	South Dakota State	DB	Sr
First Team Defense	Devin Hembry	North Dakota	DB	5th
First Team Defense	Keondre Jackson	Illinois State	DB	Sr
First Team Defense	Tucker Large	South Dakota State	DB	Jr
First Team Defense	Dennis Shorter	South Dakota	DB	Sr
First Team Special Teams	Grant Burkett	Missouri State	P	Sr
First Team Special Teams	Sergio Morancy	Northern Iowa	RS	Sr
First Team Special Teams	Caden Bolz	Missouri State	DS	Sr
First Team Special Teams	Beau Brungard	Youngstown State	AP	So
First Team Special Teams	Angel Johnson	South Dakota State	AP	Jr

Award	Player	School	Position	Year
Second Team Offense	Mark Gronowski	South Dakota State	QB	Sr
Second Team Offense	CharMar Brown	North Dakota State	RB	RS-Fr
Second Team Offense	Jacardia Wright	Missouri State	RB	Sr
Second Team Offense	Jaden Norby	North Dakota	FB	Sr
Second Team Offense	Joe Cotton	South Dakota	OL	RS-So
Second Team Offense	Bryce Henderson	South Dakota	OL	RS-Jr
Second Team Offense	Cash Hudson	Missouri State	OL	So
Second Team Offense	Jared Penning	Northern Iowa	OL	RS-Sr
Second Team Offense	Jaison Williams	Youngstown State	OL	Sr
Second Team Offense	Lance Mason	Missouri State	TE	Jr
Second Team Offense	Daniel Sobkowicz	Illinois State	WR	Jr
Second Team Offense	Griffin Wilde	South Dakota State	WR	So
Second Team Offense	Hunter Wood	Missouri State	WR	Sr
Second Team Defense	Jake Anderson	Illinois State	DL	So
Second Team Defense	Blake Holden	South Dakota	DL	Sr
Second Team Defense	Joey Shew	Indiana State	DL	RS-Jr
Second Team Defense	Darion Smith	Missouri State	DL	Sr
Second Team Defense	Ben Bogle	Southern Illinois	LB	So
Second Team Defense	Gary Bryant III	South Dakota	LB	RS-So
Second Team Defense	Tahj Chambers	Missouri State	LB	Sr
Second Team Defense	Mark Cannon Jr.	Illinois State	DB	Jr
Second Team Defense	Colby Huerter	South Dakota State	DB	Sr
Second Team Defense	Colby Humphrey	South Dakota State	DB	Sr
Second Team Defense	Mike Reid	South Dakota	DB	Sr
Second Team Defense	Ubayd Steed	Southern Illinois	DB	Sr
Second Team Special Teams	Griffin Crosa	North Dakota State	PK	Sr
Second Team Special Teams	Brendon Kilpatrick	Youngstown State	P	Jr
Second Team Special Teams	Jackson Williams	North Dakota State	RS	Fr
Second Team Special Teams	Sam Merryman	Youngstown State	DS	Sr
Second Team Special Teams	Jacardia Wright	Missouri State	AP	Sr

=== National Awards ===
On November 26, 2024, STATS Perform released their list of finalists for the Walter Payton Award, Buck Buchanan Award, Jerry Rice Award, and Eddie Robinson Award, respectively. Finalists are listed by order they appear in the STATS Perform article:

==== Walter Payton Award ====
The following MVFC players were listed as finalists for the Walter Payton Award, which is given to the best FCS offensive player:

- Jacob Clark (QB - Missouri State)
- Mark Gronowski (QB - South Dakota State)
- Cam Miller (QB - North Dakota State)

==== Buck Buchanan Award ====
The following MVFC players were listed as finalists for the Buck Buchanan Award, which is given to the best FCS defensive player:

- Mi'Quise Humphrey-Grace (DL - South Dakota)
- Eli Mostaert (DL - North Dakota State)
- Ben Bogle (LB - Southern Illinois)
- Cabel Francl (LB - South Dakota State)

==== Jerry Rice Award ====
The Jerry Rice Award is given to the most outstanding FCS freshman. The MVFC's own CharMar Brown (RB - North Dakota State) won the award. The other conference finalist is listed below:

- Elijah Owens (QB - Indiana State)

==== Eddie Robinson Award ====
The following MVFC coaches were listed as finalists for the Eddie Robinson Award, which is given to the best FCS head coach:

- Brock Spack (Illinois State)

=== All-Americans ===
	AP 1st Team	AP 2nd Team	AFCA 1st Team	AFCA 2nd Team	STATS 1st Team	STATS 2nd Team	STATS 3rd Team	ADA
Adam Bock, LB, South Dakota State		✓	✓			✓		
Bo Belquist, WR, North Dakota				✓				
Brendon Kilpatrick, P, Youngstown State							✓	
Caden Bolz, LS, Missouri State				✓	✓			
Caleb Francl, LB, South Dakota State					✓			
Cam Miller, QB, North Dakota State		✓		✓	✓			
Dalys Beanum, DB, South Dakota State		✓			✓			
Dennis Shorter, DB, South Dakota		✓				✓		
Eli Mostaert, DL, North Dakota State		✓			✓			
Evan Beernsten, OL, South Dakota State		✓		✓		✓		
Grey Zabel, OL, North Dakota State	✓		✓		✓			✓
Gus Miller, OL, South Dakota State	✓		✓		✓			
James London, PK, Murray State							✓	
JJ Galbreath, TE, South Dakota	✓							
Joey Lombard, OL, South Dakota		✓					✓	
Keondre Jackson, DB, Illinois State							✓	
Lance Mason, TE, Missouri State							✓	
Mark Gronowski, QB, South Dakota State						✓		
Mason Miller, OL, North Dakota State	✓							
Mi'Quise Humphrey-Grace, DL, South Dakota	✓		✓	✓				
Nick Gaes, DL, South Dakota							✓	
Tye Niekamp, LB, Illinois State				✓	✓			
Sam Merryman, LS, Youngstown State							✓	

== Home attendance ==
Team	Stadium	Capacity	Game 1	Game 2	Game 3	Game 4	Game 5	Game 6	Game 7	Game 8	Game 9	Total	Average	% of capacity
Illinois State	Hancock Stadium	13,391	12,440†	9,012	11,687	6,232	6,381	5,631				51,383	8,563	64.0%
Indiana State	Memorial Stadium	12,764	3,614	3,466	3,056	4,266†	3,013	3,188				20,603	3,433	26.9%
Missouri State	Robert W. Plaster Stadium	17,500	9,642	12,117†	11,280	8,134	7,142					48,315	9,663	55.2%
Murray State	Roy Stewart Stadium	16,800	7,213	9,088	6,437	15,991†	6,133	5,127				49,989	8,331	49.6%
North Dakota	Alerus Center	12,283	11,595	10,685	8,491	10,828	11,617†	9,797	8,974			71,987	10,283	83.7%
North Dakota State	Fargodome	18,700	16,811	17,185	**18,723**	**18,807**†	14,528	14,679	10,373‡	10,353‡	17,849‡	139,038	15,448	82.6%
Northern Iowa	UNI-Dome	16,324	8,458	12,611†	10,848	1,880	8,398					42,195	8,439	51.7%
South Dakota	DakotaDome	9,100	7,435	6,529	6,706	8,934	5,515	9,062†	6,231‡	6,135‡		56,547	7,068	77.7%
South Dakota State	Dana J. Dykhouse Stadium	19,340	19,321	**19,376**†	19,331	**19,351**	16,376	17,268	10,376‡	8,671‡		130,070	16,258	84.1%
Southern Illinois	Saluki Stadium	15,000	7,879	13,421†	7,157	9,610	4,933	5,310				48,310	8,051	53.7%
Youngstown State	Stambaugh Stadium	20,630	7,649	12,415†	8,560	9,979	4,933					43,536	8,707	42.2%

Bold - Exceed or met capacity
†Season High
‡FCS Playoff Game

== 2025 NFL draft ==
The following list includes all MVFC players who were drafted in the 2025 NFL draft.

Player	Position	School	Draft round	Round pick	Overall pick	Team
Grey Zabel	OG	North Dakota State	1	18	18	Seattle Seahawks
Cam Miller	QB	North Dakota State	6	39	215	Las Vegas Raiders

=== Undrafted Free Agents ===
Player	Position	School	Team
Keondre Jackson	S	Illinois State	Baltimore Ravens
Jacardia Wright	RB	Missouri State	Seattle Seahawks
Eli Mostaert	DT	North Dakota State	Jacksonville Jaguars
Mason Miller	OL	North Dakota State	Detroit Lions
Nick Kubitz	LB	North Dakota State	Atlanta Falcons
Jared Penning	OL	Northern Iowa	Baltimore Ravens
JJ Galbreath	TE	South Dakota	Pittsburgh Steelers
Mike Reid	CB	South Dakota	Carolina Panthers
Amar Johnson	RB	South Dakota State	Green Bay Packers
Dalys Beanum	CB	South Dakota State	New Orleans Saints
Jaison Williams	OL	Youngstown State	New York Giants

== Head coaches ==
Through January 6, 2025
All stats include 2024 season

Team	Head coach	Years at school	Overall record	Record at school	MVFC record	MVFC titles	FCS playoff appearances	FCS playoff record	National titles
Illinois State	Brock Spack	16	111–74 (.600)	111–74 (.600)	71–54 (.568)	2	6	8–6 (.571)	0
Indiana State	Curt Mallory	7 (Note: Indiana State did not play football in the 2020–21 academic year)	24–55 (.304)	24–55 (.304)	16–40 (.286)	0	0	0–0 (–)	0
Missouri State	Ryan Beard	2	12–11 (.522)	12–11 (.522)	9–7 (.563)	0	0	0–0 (–)	0
Murray State	Jody Wright	1	1–11 (.083)	1–11 (.083)	0–8 (.000)	0	0	0–0 (–)	0
North Dakota	Bubba Schweigert (Note: Bubba Schweigert coached Minnesota–Duluth of NCAA Division II from 2004–07. He also coached North Dakota while they were a part of the Big Sky Conference from 2014–17 and as an independent in 2018 and 2019.)	11	88–78 (.530)	66–57 (.537)	19–18 (.514)	0	5	1–5 (.167)	0
North Dakota State	Tim Polasek	1	14–2 (.875)	14–2 (.875)	7–1 (.875)	1	1	4–0 (1.000)	1
Northern Iowa	Mark Farley	24	183–112 (.620)	183–112 (.620)	117–66 (.639)	7	13	16–13 (.552)	0
South Dakota	Bob Nielson (Note: Bob Nielson coached Western Illinois from 2013–2015, which included a run in the playoffs that ended in the second round. Nielson also coached Minnesota–Duluth from 1999–2003 and 2008–12, that second stint included five consecutive NCAA Division II playoff appearances highlighted by two national titles. The first stint at Minnesota–Duluth included his first Division II playoff appearance. Nielson also coached Wisconsin–Eau Claire from 1996–98 that included one NCAA Division III playoff run that ended in the semifinals. Before that, he coached Wartburg from 1991–95, which included two Division III playoff runs as well. His first head coaching job was at Ripon from 1989–90.)	9	239–128–1 (.651)	53–48 (.525)	37–32 (.536)	1	3	4–4 (.500)	2
South Dakota State	Jimmy Rogers	2	27–3 (.900)	27–3 (.900)	15–1 (.938)	2	2	6–1 (.857)	1
Southern Illinois	Nick Hill	9	48–56 (.462)	48–56 (.462)	28–42 (.400)	0	3	3–3 (.500)	0
Youngstown State	Doug Phillips	5	21–31 (.404)	21–31 (.404)	15–23 (.395)	0	1	1–1 (.500)	0
