= 2024 North Dakota Fighting Hawks football team =

American college football season

2024 North Dakota Fighting Hawks football
- Conference: Missouri Valley Football Conference
- Record: 5–7 (2–6 MVFC)
- Head coach: Bubba Schweigert (11th season)
- Offensive coordinator: Isaac Fruechte (1st season)
- Offensive scheme: Spread
- Defensive coordinator: Joel Schwenzfeier (2nd season)
- Base defense: 3–4
- Home stadium: Alerus Center

2024 Missouri Valley Football Conference standings
	Conf.			Overall
Team	W		L	W		L
No. 1 North Dakota State +^	7	–	1	14	–	2
No. 3 South Dakota State +^	7	–	1	12	–	3
No. 4 South Dakota +^	7	–	1	11	–	3
Missouri State *	6	–	2	8	–	4
No. 11 Illinois State ^	6	–	2	10	–	4
Youngstown State	3	–	5	4	–	8
Indiana State	3	–	5	4	–	8
North Dakota	2	–	6	5	–	7
Southern Illinois	2	–	6	4	–	8
Northern Iowa	1	–	7	3	–	9
Murray State	0	–	8	1	–	11
+ – Conference co-champions; ^ – FCS playoff participant; * – Ineligible for 2024 FCS playoffs due to transition to the FBS; Rankings from STATS Poll

The 2024 North Dakota Fighting Hawks football team represented the University of North Dakota as a member of the Missouri Valley Football Conference (MVFC) during the 2024 NCAA Division I FCS football season. Led by 11th-year head coach Bubba Schweigert, the Fighting Hawks were compiled an overall record of 5–7 with a mark of 2–6 in conference play, tying for eighth place in the MVFC. The team played home games at the Alerus Center in Grand Forks, North Dakota.

== Schedule ==
Date	Time	Opponent	Rank	Site	TV	Result	Attendance
August 31	2:30 p.m.	at Iowa State*	No. 24	Jack Trice Stadium; Ames, IA	FS1	L 3–21	56,148
September 7	6:00 p.m.	No. 4 Montana*	No. 23	Alerus Center; Grand Forks, ND	MidcoSN/ESPN+	W 27–24	11,595
September 14	1:00 p.m.	Idaho State*	No. 10	Alerus Center; Grand Forks, ND	MidcoSN/ESPN+	W 52–28	10,685
September 21	1:00 p.m.	San Diego*	No. 10	Alerus Center; Grand Forks, ND	MidcoSN/ESPN+	W 41–24	8,491
September 28	1:00 p.m.	Murray State	No. 9	Alerus Center; Grand Forks, ND	MidcoSN/ESPN+	W 72–35	10,828
October 5	2:30 p.m.	at No. 2 North Dakota State	No. 7	Fargodome; Fargo, ND (Nickel Trophy)	MidcoSN/ABC ND/ESPN+	L 17–41	18,723
October 19	1:00 p.m.	Northern Iowa	No. 9	Alerus Center; Grand Forks, ND	MidcoSN/ESPN+	W 31–7	11,617
October 26	5:00 p.m.	at Youngstown State	No. 7	Stambaugh Stadium; Youngstown, OH	ESPN+	L 40–41 ^{OT}	9,979
November 2	12:00 p.m.	at Indiana State	No. 15	Memorial Stadium; Terre Haute, IN	ESPN+	L 31–35	3,013
November 9	1:00 p.m.	No. 3 South Dakota State	No. 21	Alerus Center; Grand Forks, ND	MidcoSN/ESPN+	L 7–38	9,797
November 16	12:00 p.m.	No. 5 South Dakota		Alerus Center; Grand Forks, ND (Sitting Bull Trophy)	MidcoSN/ESPN+	L 36–42	8,974
November 23	12:00 p.m.	at No. 14 Illinois State		Hancock Stadium; Normal, IL	ESPN+	L 13–35	5,631
*Non-conference game; Rankings from STATS Poll released prior to the game; All times are in Central time

== Game summaries ==
=== at Iowa State ===
No. 24 North Dakota Fighting Hawks (0–0) at Iowa State Cyclones (0–0) – Game summary

Quarter	1	2	3	4	Total
No. 24 Fighting Hawks	0	3	0	0	3
Cyclones	7	7	0	7	21

at Jack Trice Stadium • Ames, IA

- Date: August 31, 2024
- Game time: 2:30 p.m.
- Game weather: Clear; 82 °F (28 °C); Wind: SW 9 mph
- Game attendance: 56,148
- Referee: Mike McCabe
- TV announcers (FS1): Eric Collins (play-by-play) and Spencer Tillman (analyst)

Game information

First Quarter

- (14:22) ISU - Higgins, Jayden 21 yd pass from Becht, Rocco (Konrardy, Kyle kick) (Drive: 2 plays, 75 yards, 0:38; ISU 7–0)

Second Quarter

- (3:00) UND – Elrichs, CJ 26 yd field goal (Drive: 23 plays, 88 yards, 12:24; ISU 7–3)
- (0:48) ISU - Noel, Jaylin 14 yd pass from Becht, Rocco (Konrardy, Kyle kick) (Drive: 7 plays, 65 yards, 2:12; ISU 14–3)

Fourth Quarter

- (12:33) ISU - ISU - Becht, Rocco 2 yd run (Konrardy, Kyle kick) (Drive: 12 plays, 96 yards, 6:54; ISU 21–3)

Statistics	UND	ISU
First downs	20	18
Total yards	295	353
Rushing yards	174	86
Passing yards	121	267
Passing: Comp–Att–Int	17–30–1	20–26–0
Time of possession	37:51	22:09

Team	Category	Player	Statistics
North Dakota	Passing	Simon Romfo	17–30, 121 yds, INT
North Dakota	Rushing	Isaiah Smith	12 car, 50 yds
North Dakota	Receiving	Bo Belquist	6 rec, 43 yds
Iowa State	Passing	Rocco Becht	20–26, 267 yds, 2 TD
Iowa State	Rushing	Abu Sama	5 car, 36 yds
Iowa State	Receiving	Jaylin Noel	8 rec, 135 yds, TD

=== No. 4 Montana ===
Game Two – No. 4 Montana Grizzlies (1–0) at No. 23 North Dakota Fighting Hawks (0–1) – Game summary

Quarter	1	2	3	4	Total
No. 4 Grizzlies	21	3	0	0	24
No. 23 Fighting Hawks	7	0	14	6	27

at Alerus Center • Grand Forks, ND

- Date: Saturday September 7, 2024
- Game time: 5:00 PM
- Game attendance: 11,595
- TV announcers (ESPN+/MTN/MidCo): Alex Heinert, Ryan Kasowski

Statistics	MONT	UND
First downs	16	25
Total yards	305	340
Rushing yards	160	243
Passing yards	145	97
Passing: Comp–Att–Int	21-31-0	11-24-1
Time of possession	22:46	37:14

Team	Category	Player	Statistics
Montana	Passing	Keali'i Ah Yat	21/29, 145 yards, 1 TD
Montana	Rushing	Eli Gillman	8 carries, 86 yards, 1 TD
Montana	Receiving	Xavier Harris	5 receptions, 56 yards, 1 TD
North Dakota	Passing	Simon Romfo	11/24, 97 yards, 1 INT
North Dakota	Rushing	Gaven Ziebarth	22 carries, 88 yards, 1 TD
North Dakota	Receiving	Bo Belquist	4 receptions, 33 yards

=== at No. 2 North Dakota State ===
No. 7 North Dakota Fighting Hawks (4–1) at No. 2 North Dakota State Bison (4–1) – Game summary

Quarter	1	2	3	4	Total
No. 7 Fighting Hawks	0	10	0	7	17
No. 2 Bison	14	10	14	3	41

at Fargodome • Fargo, ND

- Date: October 5, 2024
- Game time: 2:30 p.m.
- Game weather: None (Indoor stadium)
- Game attendance: 18,723
- Referee: Gregory Gompf
- TV: ESPN+

Game information

First quarter

- (10:39) NDSU – CharMar Brown 2-yard run, Griffin Crosa kick (Drive: 7 plays, 56 yards, 4:11; North Dakota State 7–0)
- (2:14) NDSU – Bryce Lance 36-yard pass from Cam Miller, Griffin Crosa kick (Drive: 7 plays, 61 yards, 3:36; North Dakota State 14–0)

Second quarter

- (10:38) UND – Quincy Vaughn 1-yard run, CJ Elrichs kick (Drive: 11 plays, 75 yards, 3:36; North Dakota State 14–7)
- (7:47) NDSU – Chris Harris 16-yard pass from Cam Miller, Griffin Crosa kick (Drive: 5 plays, 65 yards, 2:51; North Dakota State 21–7)
- (3:02) UND – CJ Elrichs 45-yard field goal (Drive: 10 plays, 47 yards, 4:45; North Dakota State 21–10)
- (0:34) NDSU – Griffin Crosa 34-yard field goal (Drive: 11 plays, 58 yards, 2:20; North Dakota State 24–10)

Third quarter

- (11:10) NDSU – Cam Miller 2-yard run, Griffin Crosa kick (Drive: 8 plays, 38 yards, 3:44; North Dakota State 31–10)
- (3:02) NDSU – Mekhi Collins 33-yard pass from Cole Payton, Griffin Crosa kick (Drive: 9 plays, 85 yards, 4:59; North Dakota State 38–10)

Fourth quarter

- (12:33) UND – Caden Dennis 5-yard pass from Simon Romfo, CJ Elrichs kick (Drive: 1 play, 5 yards, 0:04; North Dakota State 38–17)
- (5:58) NDSU – Griffin Crosa 45-yard field goal (Drive: 13 plays, 48 yards, 6:35; North Dakota State 41–17)

Statistics	North Dakota	North Dakota State
First downs	14	25
Plays–yards	54–267	69–429
Rushes–yards	31–101	45–208
Passing yards	166	221
Passing: comp–att–int	18–23–0	16–24–0
Time of possession	25:41	34:19

Team	Category	Player	Statistics
North Dakota	Passing	Simon Romfo	18/23, 166 yards, TD
North Dakota	Rushing	Gaven Ziebarth	12 carries, 65 yards
North Dakota	Receiving	Bo Belquist	4 receptions, 61 yards
North Dakota State	Passing	Cam Miller	13/19, 168 yards, 2 TD
North Dakota State	Rushing	CharMar Brown	21 carries, 83 yards, TD
North Dakota State	Receiving	Bryce Lance	2 receptions, 50 yards, TD

=== Northern Iowa ===
Game Seven – Northern Iowa Panthers (2–4) vs No. 9 North Dakota Fighting Hawks (4–2) – Game summary

Quarter	1	2	3	4	Total
Panthers	0	7	0	0	7
No. 9 Fighting Hawks	7	14	0	10	31

at Alerus Center • Grand Forks, ND

- Date: Saturday October 19, 2024
- Game time: 1:00 p.m.
- Game weather: None (indoor stadium)
- TV: ESPN+

Game information

First quarter
Second quarter
Third quarter
Fourth quarter

Statistics	UNI	UND
First downs		
Total yards		
Rushing yards		
Passing yards		
Passing: Comp–Att–Int		
Time of possession		

Team	Category	Player	Statistics
Northern Iowa	Passing		
Northern Iowa	Rushing		
Northern Iowa	Receiving		
North Dakota	Passing		
North Dakota	Rushing		
North Dakota	Receiving		

=== at Youngstown State ===
Game Eight – No. 7 North Dakota Fighting Hawks (5–2) at Youngstown State Penguins (2–6) – Game summary

Quarter	1	2	3	4	OT	Total
No. 7 Fighting Hawks	7	13	7	7	6	40
Penguins	7	14	10	3	7	41

at Stambaugh Stadium, Youngstown, OH

- Date: Saturday October 26, 2024
- Game time: 4:00 PM
- Game weather: Cloudy • Temperature: 53 °F (12 °C) • Wind: NW at 10 miles per hour (16 km/h)
- Game attendance: 9,979
- Referee: Gregory Gompf
- TV announcers (ESPN+): Jody Norstedt (play-by-play) and Jalen Morrison (analyst)

Game information

First quarter

- (8:47) YSU – Cyrus Traugh 7-yard pass from Beau Brungard, Andrew Lastovka kick (Drive: 13 plays, 75 yards, 6:13; YSU 7–0)
- (4:47) UND – Gaven Ziebarth 5-yard run, C.J. Elrichs kick (Drive: 7 plays, 75 yards, 4:00; Tied 7–7)

Second quarter

- (13:04) UND – Gaven Ziebarth 1-yard run, C.J. Elrichs kick failed (Drive: 11 plays, 59 yards, 5:51; UND 13–7)
- (7:03) YSU – Beau Brungard 13-yard run, Andrew Lastovka kick (Drive: 10 plays, 86 yards, 5:53; YSU 14–13)
- (1:15) UND – Isaiah Smith 19-yard pass from Simon Romfo, C.J. Elrichs kick (Drive: 11 plays, 90 yards, 5:43; UND 20–14)
- (0:06) YSU – Beau Brungard 28-yard run, Andrew Lastovka kick (Drive: 8 plays, 72 yards, 1:09; YSU 21–20)

Third quarter

- (10:06) UND – Bo Belquist 6-yard pass from Simon Romfo, C.J. Elrichs kick (Drive: 3 plays, 19 yards, 1:22; UND 27–21)
- (4:49) YSU – Beau Brungard 2-yard run, Andrew Lastovka kick (Drive: 9 plays, 75 yards, 5:17; YSU 28–27)
- (0:13) YSU – Andrew Lastovka 34-yard field goal (Drive: 4 plays, 8 yards, 2:10; YSU 31–27)

Fourth quarter

- (9:13) UND – Gaven Ziebarth 2-yard run, C.J. Elrichs kick (Drive: 13 plays, 65 yards, 6:00; UND 34–31)
- (0:12) YSU – Andrew Lastovka 35-yard field goal (Drive: 10 plays, 65 yards, 3:31; Tied 34–34)

Overtime

- YSU – Tyshon King 1-yard run, Andrew Lastovka kick (Drive: 5 plays, 25 yards; YSU 41–34)
- UND – Bo Belquist 1-yard pass from Simon Romfo, Simon Romfo conversion pass failed (Drive: 5 plays, 25 yards; YSU 41–40)

Statistics	UND	YSU
First downs	21	23
Total yards	356	406
Rushing yards	144	334
Passing yards	212	72
Passing: Comp–Att–Int	19–24–0	8–13–1
Time of possession	32:28	27:32

Team	Category	Player	Statistics
North Dakota	Passing	Simon Romfo	19/24, 212 yards, 3 TD
North Dakota	Rushing	Isaiah Smith	9 carries, 63 yards
North Dakota	Receiving	Bo Belquist	10 receptions, 105 yards, 2 TD
Youngstown State	Passing	Beau Brungard	8/12, 72 yards, TD, INT
Youngstown State	Rushing	Beau Brungard	18 carries, 176 yards, 3 TD
Youngstown State	Receiving	Cyrus Traugh	3 receptions, 27 yards, TD

=== at Indiana State ===
Game Nine – No. 15 North Dakota Fighting Hawks (5–3) vs Indiana State Sycamores (3–5) – Game summary

Quarter	1	2	3	4	Total
No. 15 Fighting Hawks	0	0	0	0	0
Sycamores	0	0	0	0	0

at Memorial Stadium • Terre Haute, IN

- Date: Saturday November 2, 2024
- Game time: 12:00 p.m. CST
- Game weather: 0 °F (−18 °C)
- TV: ESPN+

Game information

First quarter
Second quarter
Third quarter
Fourth quarter

Statistics	UND	INST
First downs		
Total yards		
Rushing yards		
Passing yards		
Passing: Comp–Att–Int		
Time of possession		

Team	Category	Player	Statistics
North Dakota	Passing		
North Dakota	Rushing		
North Dakota	Receiving		
Indiana State	Passing		
Indiana State	Rushing		
Indiana State	Receiving		

=== No. 5 South Dakota ===
Game Eleven – No. 5 South Dakota Coyotes (7–2) at North Dakota Fighting Hawks (5–5) – Game summary

Quarter	1	2	3	4	Total
No. 5 Coyotes	0	17	10	15	42
Fighting Hawks	7	14	0	15	36

at Alerus Center, Grand Forks, ND

- Date: Saturday November 16, 2024
- Game time: 12:00 p.m.
- Game weather: None (played indoors)
- Game attendance: 8,974
- TV: ESPN+

Game information

First quarter
Second quarter
Third quarter
Fourth quarter

Statistics	SDAK	UND
First downs	25	23
Total yards	512	323
Rushing yards	322	143
Passing yards	190	180
Passing: Comp–Att–Int	20-31-0	
Time of possession	32:44	27:16

Team	Category	Player	Statistics
South Dakota	Passing	Aidan Bouman	15-21 190 Yards 3 TD 1 INT
South Dakota	Rushing	Charles Pierre Jr	15 Carries 173 Yards 1 TD
South Dakota	Receiving	Charles Pierre Jr	4 Receptions 75 Yards 1 TD
North Dakota	Passing	Simon Roufo	20-30 180 Yards 3 TD
North Dakota	Rushing	Sawyer Seidl	7 Carries 68 Yards 1 TD
North Dakota	Receiving	Bo Belquist	10 Receptions 96 Yards 1 TD

=== at No. 14 Illinois State ===
Game Twelve – North Dakota Fighting Hawks (5–6) vs No. 14 Illinois State Redbirds (8–3) – Game summary

Quarter	1	2	3	4	Total
Fighting Hawks	0	0	0	0	0
No. 14 Redbirds	0	0	0	0	0

at Hancock Stadium • Normal, IL

- Date: Saturday November 23, 2024
- Game time: 12:00 p.m.
- Game weather: 0 °F (−18 °C)
- TV: ESPN+

Game information

First quarter
Second quarter
Third quarter
Fourth quarter

Statistics	UND	ILST
First downs		
Total yards		
Rushing yards		
Passing yards		
Passing: Comp–Att–Int		
Time of possession		

Team	Category	Player	Statistics
North Dakota	Passing		
North Dakota	Rushing		
North Dakota	Receiving		
Illinois State	Passing		
Illinois State	Rushing		
Illinois State	Receiving		
