= Grey Zabel =

American football player (born 2002)

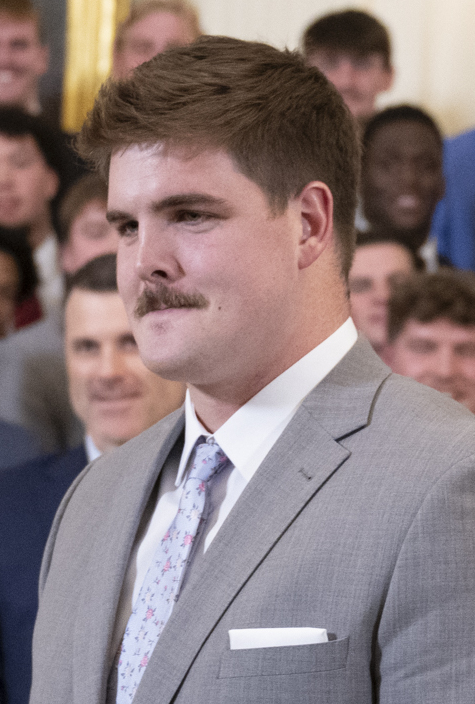
- Zabel in 2025

No. 76 – Seattle Seahawks
- Position: Guard
- Roster status: Active

Personal information
- Born: March 30, 2002 (age 24); Pierre, South Dakota, U.S.
- Listed height: 6 ft 6 in (1.98 m)
- Listed weight: 316 lb (143 kg)

Career information
- High school: T. F. Riggs (Pierre)
- College: North Dakota State (2020–2024)
- NFL draft: 2025: 1st round, 18th overall pick

Career history
- Seattle Seahawks (2025–present)

Awards and highlights
- Super Bowl champion (LX); PFWA All-Rookie Team (2025); 2× FCS national champion (2021, 2024); First-team FCS All-American (2024); First-team All-MVFC (2024)

Career NFL statistics as of Week 1, 2026
- Games played: 18
- Games started: 18
- Stats at Pro Football Reference

Grey Zabel (ZAY-bull; born March 30, 2002) is an American professional football guard for the Seattle Seahawks of the National Football League (NFL). He played college football for the North Dakota State Bison and was selected by the Seahawks in the first round of the 2025 NFL draft.

== Early life ==
Born on March 30, 2002, in Pierre, South Dakota, Zabel attended T. F. Riggs High School, where he played both offensive and defensive line and helped his team win 3 State Championships. He committed to North Dakota State University in Fargo to play college football.

== College career ==
Zabel (#74) played for the Bison from 2020 to 2024; after two years as a backup, he became a starter in 2022. Despite NIL offers to transfer to other schools, Zabel returned to NDSU for his final year in 2024, and played in the Senior Bowl.

== Professional career ==
Pre-draft measurables
Height	Weight	Arm length	Hand span	Wingspan	20-yard shuttle	Three-cone drill	Vertical jump	Broad jump	Bench press
6 ft 5 7/8 in (1.98 m)	312 lb (142 kg)	32 in (0.81 m)	9 1/2 in (0.24 m)	6 ft 5 1/2 in (1.97 m)	4.60 s	7.66 s	36.5 in (0.93 m)	9 ft 3 in (2.82 m)	26 reps
All values from NFL Combine/Pro Day

Zabel was selected by the Seattle Seahawks in the first round with the 18th overall selection in the 2025 NFL draft. He started in all 17 regular season games and three playoff games as a rookie. Zabel ended his rookie season as a Super Bowl champion, starting in Super Bowl LX, in which the Seahawks won 29-13 over the New England Patriots.
