= 2024 Indiana State Sycamores football team =

American college football season

2024 Indiana State Sycamores football
- Conference: Missouri Valley Football Conference
- Record: 4–8 (3–5 MVFC)
- Head coach: Curt Mallory (7th season)
- Offensive coordinator: Mike Bath (3rd season)
- Defensive coordinator: Brad Wilson (7th season)
- Home stadium: Memorial Stadium

2024 Missouri Valley Football Conference standings
	Conf.			Overall
Team	W		L	W		L
No. 1 North Dakota State +^	7	–	1	14	–	2
No. 3 South Dakota State +^	7	–	1	12	–	3
No. 4 South Dakota +^	7	–	1	11	–	3
Missouri State *	6	–	2	8	–	4
No. 11 Illinois State ^	6	–	2	10	–	4
Youngstown State	3	–	5	4	–	8
Indiana State	3	–	5	4	–	8
North Dakota	2	–	6	5	–	7
Southern Illinois	2	–	6	4	–	8
Northern Iowa	1	–	7	3	–	9
Murray State	0	–	8	1	–	11
+ – Conference co-champions; ^ – FCS playoff participant; * – Ineligible for 2024 FCS playoffs due to transition to the FBS; Rankings from STATS Poll

The 2024 Indiana State Sycamores football team represented Indiana State University as a member of the Missouri Valley Football Conference (MVFC) during the 2024 NCAA Division I FCS football season. Led by seventh-year head coach Curt Mallory, the Sycamores compiled an overall record of 4–8 with a mark of 3–5 in conference play, tying for sixth place in the MVFC. Indiana State played home games at Memorial Stadium in Terre Haute, Indiana.

== Schedule ==
Date	Time	Opponent	Site	TV	Result	Attendance
August 31	12:00 p.m.	at Purdue*	Ross-Ade Stadium; West Lafayette, IN	Big Ten Network	L 0–49	59,488
September 7	7:00 p.m.	at Eastern Illinois*	O'Brien Field; Charleston, IL	ESPN+	L 20–27	7,222
September 14	6:00 p.m.	Dayton*	Memorial Stadium; Terre Haute, IN	ESPN+	W 24–13	3,614
September 28	1:00 p.m.	Houston Christian*	Memorial Stadium; Terre Haute, IN	ESPN+	L 24–27	3,466
October 5	2:00 p.m.	at Youngstown State	Stambaugh Stadium; Youngstown, OH	ESPN+	L 14–21	8,202
October 12	1:00 p.m.	Murray State	Memorial Stadium; Terre Haute, IN	ESPN+	W 31-27	3,056
October 19	3:00 p.m.	at Missouri State	Robert W. Plaster Stadium; Springfield, MO	ESPN+	L 21–46	11,280
October 26	1:00 p.m.	Southern Illinois^{†}	Memorial Stadium; Terre Haute, IN	ESPN+	W 20–17	4,266
November 2	1:00 p.m.	No. 15 North Dakota	Memorial Stadium; Terre Haute, IN	ESPN+	W 35–31	3,013
November 9	2:00 p.m.	at No. 5 South Dakota	DakotaDome; Vermillion, SD	ESPN+	L 0–49	5,515
November 16	1:00 p.m.	No. 17 Illinois State	Memorial Stadium; Terre Haute, IN	ESPN+	L 19–31	3,188
November 23	2:00 p.m.	at Northern Iowa	UNI-Dome; Cedar Falls, IA	ESPN+	L 34–41	8,398
*Non-conference game; ^{†}Homecoming; Rankings from STATS Poll released prior to the game; All times are in Eastern time

== Game summaries ==
=== at Purdue ===
Game One – Indiana State Sycamores (0-0) vs Purdue Boilermakers (0-0) – Game summary

Quarter	1	2	3	4	Total
Sycamores	0	0	0	0	0
Boilermakers	7	14	14	14	49

at Ross–Ade Stadium • West Lafayette, Indiana

- Date: August 31
- Game time: 12:01 p.m. EDT
- Game weather: Sunny, 76 °F (24 °C)
- Game attendance: 59,488
- Referee: Gregory Blum
- TV announcers (BTN): Pat Boylan (play-by-play), J Lehman (analyst), Jordan Robinson (sideline reporter)
- Recap, ESPN, PurdueSports.com

Game information

First quarter

- 9:07 PUR – Max Klare 9-yard pass from Hudson Card (Spencer Porath kick) (Drive: 8 plays, 55 yards, 3:41; Purdue 7–0)

Second quarter

- 13:21 PUR – Jaron Tibbs 8-yard pass from Hudson Card (Spencer Porath kick) (Drive: 7 plays, 76 yards, 3:05; Purdue 14–0)
- 10:29 PUR – De'Nylon Morrissette 8-yard pass from Hudson Card (Spencer Porath kick) (Drive: 3 plays, 57 yards, 1:13; Purdue 21–0)

Third quarter

- 10:43 PUR – Reggie Love III 6-yard run (Spencer Porath kick), (Drive: 9 plays, 66 yards, 4:11; Purdue 28–0)
- 6:10 PUR – Leland Smith 31-yard pass from Hudson Card (Spencer Porath kick) (Drive: 4 plays, 50 yards, 1:34; Purdue 35–0)

Fourth quarter

- 11:13 PUR – Elijah Jackson 69-yard run (Spencer Porath kick), (Drive: 5 plays, 91 yards, 2:20; Purdue 42–0)
- 1:56 PUR – Jaheim Merriweather 4-yard run (Spencer Porath kick), (Drive: 5 plays, 35 yards, 1:48; Purdue 49–0)

Statistics	INST	PUR
First downs	11	27
Total yards	53–154	66–583
Rushing yards	43–104	31–248
Passing yards	50	335
Passing: Comp–Att–Int	5–10–0	30–35–0
Time of possession	30:29	29:31

Team	Category	Player	Statistics
Indiana State	Passing	Elijah Owens	5/10, 50 yards
Indiana State	Rushing	Elijah Owens	9 carries, 47 yards
Indiana State	Receiving	Rashad Rochelle	3 receptions, 26 yards
Purdue	Passing	Hudson Card	24/25, 273 yards, 4 TD
Purdue	Rushing	Devin Mockobee	11 carries, 89 yards
Purdue	Receiving	Max Klare	5 receptions, 71 yards, 1 TD

=== at Eastern Illinois ===
Game Two – Indiana State Sycamores (0–1) at Eastern Illinois Panthers (0–1) – Game summary

Quarter	1	2	3	4	Total
Sycamores	0	13	0	7	20
Panthers	7	10	10	0	27

at O'Brien Field, Charleston, IL

- Date: Saturday September 7, 2024
- Game time: 7:00 PM
- Game weather: Sunny, 65 °F (18 °C)
- Game attendance: 7,222
- Referee: Gabriel Tomlin
- TV announcers (ESPN+): Mike Bradd (play-by-play) and Dave Kidwell (analyst)

Game information

First quarter
Second quarter
Third quarter
Fourth quarter

Statistics	INST	EIU
First downs	20	16
Total yards	334	354
Rushing yards	74	86
Passing yards	260	268
Passing: Comp–Att–Int	30–37–3	19–32–1
Time of possession	31:15	28:41

Team	Category	Player	Statistics
Indiana State	Passing	Elijah Owens	30/37, 260 yards, 3 TD, 3 INT
Indiana State	Rushing	Elijah Owens	12 carries, 44 yards
Indiana State	Receiving	Rashad Rochelle	4 receptions, 45 yards, 1 TD
Eastern Illinois	Passing	Pierce Holley	19/32, 268 yards, 1 TD, 1 INT
Eastern Illinois	Rushing	MJ Flowers	24 carries, 93 yards, 1 TD
Eastern Illinois	Receiving	Terrance Gipson	6 receptions, 100 yards

=== Dayton ===
Game Three – Dayton Flyers (1–0) at Indiana State Sycamores (0–2) – Game summary

Quarter	1	2	3	4	Total
Flyers	0	0	0	0	0
Sycamores	0	0	0	0	0

at Memorial Stadium, Terre Haute, IN

- Date: Saturday September 14, 2024
- Game time: 6:00 PM
- TV announcers (ESPN+): TBD

Game information

First quarter
Second quarter
Third quarter
Fourth quarter

Statistics	DAY	INST
First downs		
Total yards		
Rushing yards		
Passing yards		
Passing: Comp–Att–Int		
Time of possession		

Team	Category	Player	Statistics
Dayton	Passing		
Dayton	Rushing		
Dayton	Receiving		
Indiana State	Passing		
Indiana State	Rushing		
Indiana State	Receiving		

=== Houston Christian ===
Game Four – Houston Christian Huskies (1–3) at Indiana State Sycamores (1–2) – Game summary

Quarter	1	2	3	4	Total
Huskies	0	0	0	0	0
Sycamores	0	0	0	0	0

at Memorial Stadium, Terre Haute, IN

- Date: Saturday September 28, 2024
- Game time: 1:00 PM
- TV announcers (ESPN+): TBD

Game information

First quarter
Second quarter
Third quarter
Fourth quarter

Statistics	HCU	INST
First downs		
Total yards		
Rushing yards		
Passing yards		
Passing: Comp–Att–Int		
Time of possession		

Team	Category	Player	Statistics
Houston Christian	Passing		
Houston Christian	Rushing		
Houston Christian	Receiving		
Indiana State	Passing		
Indiana State	Rushing		
Indiana State	Receiving		

=== at Youngstown State ===
Game Five – Indiana State Sycamores (1–3) at Youngstown State Penguins (1–4) – Game summary

Quarter	1	2	3	4	Total
Sycamores	0	0	14	0	14
Penguins	7	14	0	0	21

at Stambaugh Stadium, Youngstown, OH

- Date: Saturday October 5, 2024
- Game time: 2:00 PM
- Game weather: Sunny • Temperature: 70 °F (21 °C) • Wind: NE at 5 miles per hour (8.0 km/h)
- Game attendance: 8,202
- Referee: Aaron Adams
- TV announcers (ESPN+): Drae Smith (play-by-play) and Chris Sammarone (analyst)

Game information

First quarter

- (8:47) YSU – Ethan Wright 2-yard run, Andrew Lastovka kick (Drive: 9 plays, 47 yards, 4:43; YSU 7–0)

Second quarter

- (14:52) YSU – Latrell Fordham 8-yard pass from Beau Brungard, Andrew Lastovka kick (Drive: 11 plays, 74 yards, 6:02; YSU 14–0)
- (0:39) YSU – Ethan Wright 2-yard run, Andrew Lastovka kick (Drive: 5 plays, 56 yards, 1:59; YSU 21–0)

Third quarter

- (9:12) INST – Plez Lawrence 34-yard pass from Elijah Owens, Jake Andjelic kick (Drive: 8 plays, 77 yards, 3:46, YSU 21–7)
- (4:29) INST – Elijah Owens 4-yard run, Jake Andjelic kick (Drive: 6 plays, 73 yards, 3:06; YSU 21–14)

Fourth quarter

- No scoring plays

Statistics	INST	YSU
First downs	15	16
Total yards	184	305
Rushing yards	135	175
Passing yards	149	130
Passing: Comp–Att–Int	15–27–0	11–18–1
Time of possession	30:20	29:40

Team	Category	Player	Statistics
Indiana State	Passing	Elijah Owens	15/28, 149 yards, TD
Indiana State	Rushing	Elijah Owens	26 carries, 114 yards, TD
Indiana State	Receiving	Plez Lawrence	4 receptions, 84 yards, TD
Youngstown State	Passing	Beau Brungard	11/18, 130 yards, TD, INT
Youngstown State	Rushing	Ethan Wright	15 carries, 81 yards, 2 TD
Youngstown State	Receiving	Max Tomczak	4 receptions, 87 yards

=== Murray State ===
Game Six – Murray State Racers (1–4) at Indiana State Sycamores (1–4) – Game summary

Quarter	1	2	3	4	Total
Racers	0	0	0	0	0
Sycamores	0	0	0	0	0

at Memorial Stadium, Terre Haute, IN

- Date: Saturday October 12, 2024
- Game time: 1:00 PM
- TV announcers (ESPN+): TBD

Game information

First quarter
Second quarter
Third quarter
Fourth quarter

Statistics	MURR	INST
First downs		
Total yards		
Rushing yards		
Passing yards		
Passing: Comp–Att–Int		
Time of possession		

Team	Category	Player	Statistics
Murray State	Passing		
Murray State	Rushing		
Murray State	Receiving		
Indiana State	Passing		
Indiana State	Rushing		
Indiana State	Receiving		

=== at Missouri State ===
Game Seven – Indiana State Sycamores (2–4) at Missouri State Bears (4–2) – Game summary

Quarter	1	2	3	4	Total
Sycamores	0	0	0	0	0
Bears	0	0	0	0	0

at Robert W. Plaster Stadium, Springfield, MO

- Date: Saturday October 19, 2024
- Game time: 3:00 PM
- TV announcers (ESPN+): TBD

Game information

First quarter
Second quarter
Third quarter
Fourth quarter

Statistics	INST	MOST
First downs		
Total yards		
Rushing yards		
Passing yards		
Passing: Comp–Att–Int		
Time of possession		

Team	Category	Player	Statistics
Indiana State	Passing		
Indiana State	Rushing		
Indiana State	Receiving		
Missouri State	Passing		
Missouri State	Rushing		
Missouri State	Receiving		

=== Southern Illinois ===
Game Eight – Southern Illinois Salukis (2–5) vs Indiana State Sycamores (2–5) – Game summary

Quarter	1	2	3	4	Total
Salukis	0	0	0	0	0
Sycamores	0	0	0	0	0

at Memorial Stadium • Terre Haute, IN

- Date: Saturday October 26, 2024
- Game time: 1:00 p.m. EST
- Game weather: 0 °F (−18 °C)
- TV: ESPN+

Game information

First quarter
Second quarter
Third quarter
Fourth quarter

Statistics	SIU	INST
First downs		
Total yards		
Rushing yards		
Passing yards		
Passing: Comp–Att–Int		
Time of possession		

Team	Category	Player	Statistics
Southern Illinois	Passing		
Southern Illinois	Rushing		
Southern Illinois	Receiving		
Indiana State	Passing		
Indiana State	Rushing		
Indiana State	Receiving		

=== No. 15 North Dakota ===
Game Nine – No. 15 North Dakota Fighting Hawks (5–3) vs Indiana State Sycamores (3–5) – Game summary

Quarter	1	2	3	4	Total
No. 15 Fighting Hawks	0	0	0	0	0
Sycamores	0	0	0	0	0

at Memorial Stadium • Terre Haute, IN

- Date: Saturday November 2, 2024
- Game time: 1:00 p.m. EST
- Game weather: 0 °F (−18 °C)
- TV: ESPN+

Game information

First quarter
Second quarter
Third quarter
Fourth quarter

Statistics	UND	INST
First downs		
Total yards		
Rushing yards		
Passing yards		
Passing: Comp–Att–Int		
Time of possession		

Team	Category	Player	Statistics
North Dakota	Passing		
North Dakota	Rushing		
North Dakota	Receiving		
Indiana State	Passing		
Indiana State	Rushing		
Indiana State	Receiving		

=== at No. 5 South Dakota ===
Game Ten – Indiana State Sycamores (4–5) vs No. 5 South Dakota Coyotes (6–2) – Game summary

Quarter	1	2	3	4	Total
Sycamores	0	0	0	0	0
No. 5 Coyotes	7	14	14	14	49

at DakotaDome • Vermillion, SD

- Date: Saturday November 9, 2024
- Game time: 2:00 p.m. EST
- Game weather: None (played indoors)
- Game attendance: 5,515
- TV: ESPN+

Game information

First quarter
Second quarter
Third quarter
Fourth quarter

Statistics	INST	SDAK
First downs	5	21
Total yards	129	622
Rushing yards	-3	317
Passing yards	132	305
Passing: Comp–Att–Int	12-23-0	15-21-0
Time of possession	27:15	32:45

Team	Category	Player	Statistics
Indiana State	Passing	Elijah Owens	11-21, 131 yards
Indiana State	Rushing	Shen Butler-Lawson	10 carries, 15 yards
Indiana State	Receiving	Zavion Taylor	4 receptions, 66 yards
South Dakota	Passing	Aidan Bouman	14-20, 238 yards, 2 TD
South Dakota	Rushing	Charles Pierre Jr.	11 carries, 165 yards, 2 TD
South Dakota	Receiving	Quaron Adams	2 receptions, 133 yards, 2 TD

=== No. 17 Illinois State ===
Game Eleven – No. 17 Illinois State Redbirds (7–3) vs Indiana State Sycamores (4–6) – Game summary

Quarter	1	2	3	4	Total
No. 17 Redbirds	0	0	0	0	0
Sycamores	0	0	0	0	0

at Memorial Stadium • Terre Haute, IN

- Date: Saturday November 16, 2024
- Game time: 1:00 p.m. EST
- Game weather: 0 °F (−18 °C)
- TV: ESPN+

Game information

First quarter
Second quarter
Third quarter
Fourth quarter

Statistics	ILST	INST
First downs		
Total yards		
Rushing yards		
Passing yards		
Passing: Comp–Att–Int		
Time of possession		

Team	Category	Player	Statistics
Illinois State	Passing		
Illinois State	Rushing		
Illinois State	Receiving		
Indiana State	Passing		
Indiana State	Rushing		
Indiana State	Receiving		

=== at Northern Iowa ===
Game Twelve – Indiana State Sycamores (4–7) vs Northern Iowa Panthers (2–9) – Game summary

Quarter	1	2	3	4	Total
Sycamores	0	0	0	0	0
Panthers	0	0	0	0	0

at UNI-Dome • Cedar Falls, IA

- Date: Saturday November 23, 2024
- Game time: 2:00 p.m. EST
- Game weather: 0 °F (−18 °C)
- TV: ESPN+

Game information

First quarter
Second quarter
Third quarter
Fourth quarter

Statistics	INST	UNI
First downs		
Total yards		
Rushing yards		
Passing yards		
Passing: Comp–Att–Int		
Time of possession		

Team	Category	Player	Statistics
Indiana State	Passing		
Indiana State	Rushing		
Indiana State	Receiving		
Northern Iowa	Passing		
Northern Iowa	Rushing		
Northern Iowa	Receiving		
