= Mi'Quise Humphrey-Grace =

American football player

No. 90 – Kentucky Wildcats
- Position: Defensive end
- Class: Senior

Personal information
- Born: Cincinnati, Ohio, U.S.
- Listed height: 6 ft 4 in (1.93 m)
- Listed weight: 271 lb (123 kg)

Career information
- High school: Princeton (Sharonville, Ohio)
- College: South Dakota (2022–2024); Kentucky (2025–present)

Awards and highlights
- First-team FCS All-American (2024); MVFC Defensive Player of the Year (2024); First-team All-MVFC (2024)
- Stats at ESPN

Mi'Quise Humphrey-Grace is an American college football defensive end for the Kentucky Wildcats. He previously played for the South Dakota Coyotes.

== Early life ==
Humphrey-Grace attended Princeton High School in Sharonville, Ohio. As a senior, he had 9.5 sacks. He committed to the University of South Dakota to play college football.

== College career ==
Humphrey-Grace played at South Dakota from 2022 to 2024. After redshirting his first year after playing in three games, he played in 13 games in 2023 and had 34 tackles, 5.5 sacks and one fumble recovery returned for a touchdown. In 2024, he was the Missouri Valley Football Conference (MVFC) Defensive Player of the Year after recording 59 tackles and a conference-leading 9.5 sacks over 14 starts. After the season, Humphrey-Grace entered the transfer portal and committed to the University of Kentucky. In his first year at Kentucky in 2025, he started all 12 games and had 31 tackles and a team leading 3.5 sacks. He returned to Kentucky as a starter in 2026.
