= Jared Penning =

American football player (born 2000)

Profile
- Position: Guard

Personal information
- Born: September 17, 2000 (age 26); Clear Lake, Iowa, U.S.
- Listed height: 6 ft 5 in (1.96 m)
- Listed weight: 319 lb (145 kg)

Career information
- High school: Clear Lake
- College: Northern Iowa (2019–2024)
- NFL draft: 2025: undrafted

Career history
- Baltimore Ravens (2025–2026)*
- * Offseason or practice squad member only

Awards and highlights
- First-team All-MVFC (2023); Second-team All-MVFC (2024)
- Stats at Pro Football Reference

Jared Penning (born September 17, 2000) is an American professional football guard. He played college football for the Northern Iowa Panthers.

== College career ==
Penning played college football for the Northern Iowa Panthers from 2019 to 2024. He played in 48 games across multiple positions on the offensive line, earning first-team All-Missouri Valley Football Conference honors in 2023 and second-team All-MVFC in 2024. Penning was a STATS third-team All-American in 2023.

== Professional career ==
Pre-draft measurables
Height	Weight	Arm length	Hand span	Wingspan	40-yard dash	10-yard split	20-yard split	20-yard shuttle	Three-cone drill	Vertical jump	Bench press
6 ft 5 3/8 in (1.97 m)	319 lb (145 kg)	32 3/4 in (0.83 m)	9 3/4 in (0.25 m)	6 ft 6 5/8 in (2.00 m)	5.38 s	1.87 s	3.03 s	4.85 s	7.82 s	26.0 in (0.66 m)	22 reps
All values from Pro Day

After not being selected in the 2025 NFL draft, Penning signed with the Baltimore Ravens as an undrafted free agent. On August 26, 2025, he was waived by the team but was signed to the practice squad the following day. Penning signed a reserve/future contract with Baltimore on January 5, 2026. He was waived by the Ravens on July 25.

== Personal life ==
His brother Trevor, was drafted in the first round of 2022 NFL draft and currently plays for the Los Angeles Chargers.
