= 2024 Murray State Racers football team =

American college football season

2024 Murray State Racers football
- Conference: Missouri Valley Football Conference
- Record: 1–11 (0–8 MVFC)
- Head coach: Jody Wright (1st season)
- Co-offensive coordinators: Adam Ross (1st season); Jimmy Ogle (1st season)
- Offensive scheme: Spread
- Defensive coordinator: Ryan Smith (1st season)
- Base defense: 3–4
- Home stadium: Roy Stewart Stadium

2024 Missouri Valley Football Conference standings
	Conf.			Overall
Team	W		L	W		L
No. 1 North Dakota State +^	7	–	1	14	–	2
No. 3 South Dakota State +^	7	–	1	12	–	3
No. 4 South Dakota +^	7	–	1	11	–	3
Missouri State *	6	–	2	8	–	4
No. 11 Illinois State ^	6	–	2	10	–	4
Youngstown State	3	–	5	4	–	8
Indiana State	3	–	5	4	–	8
North Dakota	2	–	6	5	–	7
Southern Illinois	2	–	6	4	–	8
Northern Iowa	1	–	7	3	–	9
Murray State	0	–	8	1	–	11
+ – Conference co-champions; ^ – FCS playoff participant; * – Ineligible for 2024 FCS playoffs due to transition to the FBS; Rankings from STATS Poll

The 2024 Murray State Racers football team represented Murray State University as a member of the Missouri Valley Football Conference (MVFC) during the 2024 NCAA Division I FCS football season. The Racers were led by first-year head coach Jody Wright and played home games at Roy Stewart Stadium located in Murray, Kentucky.

== Preseason ==
=== MVFC poll ===
The MVFC released it preseason prediction poll on July 22, 2024. The Racers were predicted to finish last out of 11 teams in the conference.

== Schedule ==
Date	Time	Opponent	Site	TV	Result	Attendance
August 29	7:00 pm	at No. 11 (FBS) Missouri*	Faurot Field; Columbia, MO	SEC Network/ESPN+	L 0–51	62,621
September 7	6:00 pm	Butler*	Roy Stewart Stadium; Murray, KY	ESPN+	L 17–19	7,213
September 14	6:00 pm	Mississippi Valley State*	Roy Stewart Stadium; Murray, KY	ESPN+	W 59–8	9,088
September 28	1:00 pm	at No. 9 North Dakota	Alerus Center; Grand Forks, ND	ESPN+	L 35–72	10,828
October 5	2:00 pm	No. 4 South Dakota	Roy Stewart Stadium; Murray, KY	ESPN+	L 0–59	6,437
October 12	12:00 p.m.	at Indiana State	Memorial Stadium; Terre Haute, IN	ESPN+	L 27–31	3,056
October 19	2:00 pm	No. 21 Illinois State	Roy Stewart Stadium; Murray, KY	ESPN+	L 32–40	15,991
October 26	1:00 pm	No. 1 North Dakota State	Roy Stewart Stadium; Murray, KY	ESPN+	L 6–59	6,133
November 2	2:00 pm	at No. 3 South Dakota State	Dana J. Dykhouse Stadium; Brookings, SD	ESPN+	L 6–52	16,376
November 9	1:00 pm	Missouri State	Roy Stewart Stadium; Murray, KY	ESPN+	L 31–59	5,127
November 16	12:30 pm	at Kentucky*	Kroger Field; Lexington, KY	SECN+/ESPN+	L 6–48	48,370
November 23	12:00 pm	at Southern Illinois	Saluki Stadium; Carbondale, IL	ESPN+	L 0–62	5,310
*Non-conference game; Rankings from STATS Poll released prior to the game; All times are in Central time

== Game summaries ==
=== at No. 11 (FBS) Missouri ===
Game One – Murray State Racers (0–0) at No. 11 (FBS) Missouri Tigers (0–0) – Game summary

Quarter	1	2	3	4	Total
Racers	0	0	0	0	0
No. 11 (FBS) Tigers	28	7	10	6	51

at Faurot Field • Columbia, Missouri

- Date: Thursday, August 29, 2024
- Game time: 7 pm CDT
- Game weather: Sunny, 85 degrees, 7 mph south wind
- Game attendance: 62,621
- TV announcers (SECN): Matt Barrie (play-by-play), Dan Mullen (analyst), and Harry Lyles Jr. (sideline)

Game information

First quarter

- (12:42) MIZZ: Luther Burden III 16 yard pass from Brady Cook (Blake Craig Kick) (Drive: 6 plays, 42 yards, 2:15; Missouri 7-0)
- (9:48) MIZZ: Nate Noel 9 yard run (Blake Craig Kick) (Drive: 3 plays, 34 yards, 1:12; Missouri 14-0)
- (9:41) MIZZ: Toriano Pride Jr. 25 yard interception return (Blake Craig Kick) (Drive: 1 plays, 0 yards, 0:08; Missouri 21-0)
- (3:38) MIZZ: Marcus Carroll 1 yard run (Blake Craig Kick) (Drive: 6 plays, 70 yards, 2:03; Missouri 28-0)

Second quarter

- (0:01) MIZZ: Brady Cook 3 yard run (Blake Craig Kick) (Drive: 14 plays, 68 yards, 3:02; Missouri 35-0)

Third quarter

- (8:50) MIZZ: Blake Craig 39 yard field goal (Drive: 9 plays, 76 yards, 4:21; Missouri 38-0)
- (7:09) MIZZ: Jamal Roberts 2 yard run (Blake Craig Kick) (Drive: 2 plays, 10 yards, 0:49; Missouri 45-0)

Fourth quarter

- (13:34) MIZZ: Blake Craig 22 yard field goal (Drive: 14 plays, 76 yards, 7:06; Missouri 48-0)
- (1:57) MIZZ: Blake Craig 27 yard field goal (Drive: 12 plays, 84 yards, 6:32; Missouri 51-0)

Statistics	MURR	MIZZ
First downs	5	30
Total yards	85	489
Rushing yards	58	189
Passing yards	27	300
Passing: Comp–Att–Int	7-15-1	29-41-0
Time of possession	26:46	33:14

Team	Category	Player	Statistics
Murray State	Passing	Jayden Johannsen	7-13, 27 yards, 1 INT
Murray State	Rushing	Jawaun Northington	7 carries, 25 yards
Murray State	Receiving	Josh Crabtree	2 reception, 14 yards
Missouri	Passing	Brady Cook	19-30, 218 yards, 1 TD
Missouri	Rushing	Nate Noel	11 carries, 48 yards, 1 TD
Missouri	Receiving	Mookie Cooper	1 reception, 49 yards

=== No. 4 South Dakota ===
Game Six – No. 4 South Dakota Coyotes (3–1) vs Murray State Racers (1–3) – Game summary

Quarter	1	2	3	4	Total
No. 4 Coyotes	21	3	21	14	59
Racers	0	0	0	0	0

at Roy Stewart Stadium • Murray, KY

- Date: Saturday October 5, 2024
- Game time: 2:00 p.m.
- Game weather: 0 °F (−18 °C)
- Game attendance: 6.437
- TV: ESPN+

Game information

First quarter
Second quarter
Third quarter
Fourth quarter

Statistics	SDAK	MURR
First downs	26	10
Total yards	582	213
Rushing yards	361	90
Passing yards	221	123
Passing: Comp–Att–Int	16-22-1	13-21-2
Time of possession	36:20	23:40

Team	Category	Player	Statistics
South Dakota	Passing	Aidan Bouman	16-22, 221 yards, TD, INT
South Dakota	Rushing	Travis Theis	14 carries, 132 yards, 2 TD
South Dakota	Receiving	Quaron Adams	3 receptions, 83 yards
Murray State	Passing	Jayden Johannsen	7-13, 84 yards, 2 INT
Murray State	Rushing	Jawaun Northington	11 carries, 46 yards
Murray State	Receiving	JK Carter	3 receptions, 54 yards

=== No. 1 North Dakota State ===
Game Eight – No. 1 North Dakota State Bison (7–1) vs Murray State Racers (1–6) – Game summary

Quarter	1	2	3	4	Total
No. 1 Bison	21	21	10	7	59
Racers	0	3	0	3	6

at Roy Stewart Stadium • Murray, KY

- Date: Saturday October 26, 2024
- Game time: 1:00 p.m.
- Game weather: Cloudy • Temperature: 66 °F (19 °C) • Wind: NE 10 miles per hour (16 km/h)
- Game attendance: 6,133
- Referee: Aaron Adams
- TV: ESPN+

Game information

First quarter

- (11:55) NDSU – CharMar Brown 7-yard run, Griffin Crosa kick (Drive: 6 plays, 75 yards, 3:05; North Dakota State 7–0)
- (5:05) NDSU – Bryce Lance 74-yard pass from Cam Miller, Griffin Crosa kick (Drive: 1 play, 74 yards, 0:11; North Dakota State 14–0)
- (4:14) NDSU – Enock Sibomana 34-yard interception, Griffin Crosa kick (North Dakota State 21–0)

Second quarter

- (12:47) NDSU – CharMar Brown 3-yard run, Griffin Crosa kick (Drive: 7 plays, 60 yards, 3:21; North Dakota State 28–0)
- (8:32) MURR – James London 24-yard field goal (Drive: 10 plays, 69 yards, 4:15; North Dakota State 28–3)
- (6:58) NDSU – Bryce Lance 17-yard pass from Cam Miller, Griffin Crosa kick (Drive: 3 plays, 42 yards, 1:34; North Dakota State 35–3)
- (0:53) NDSU – Bryce Lance 6-yard pass from Cam Miller, Griffin Crosa kick (Drive: 7 plays, 80 yards, 2:08; North Dakota State 42–3)

Third quarter

- (13:16) NDSU – CharMar Brown 1-yard run, Griffin Crosa kick (Drive: 5 plays, 30 yards, 1:38; North Dakota State 49–3)
- (10:09) NDSU – Eli Ozick 31-yard field goal (Drive: 7 plays, 12 yards, 2:27; North Dakota State 52–3)

Fourth quarter

- (7:58) MURR – James London 47-yard field goal (Drive: 4 plays, -2 yards, 1:13; North Dakota State 52–6)
- (1:11) NDSU – John Gores 9-yard pass from Nathan Hayes, Eli Ozick kick (Drive: 12 plays, 75 yards, 6:47; North Dakota State 59–6)

Statistics	NDSU	MURR
First downs	23	19
Total yards	459	308
Rushing yards	190	116
Passing yards	269	192
Passing: Comp–Att–Int	14–20–0	18–33–3
Time of possession	29:00	31:00

Team	Category	Player	Statistics
North Dakota State	Passing	Nathan Hayes	9/15, 141 yards, 2 TD
North Dakota State	Rushing	CharMar Brown	13 carries, 97 yards, 3 TD
North Dakota State	Receiving	Bryce Lance	4 receptions, 108 yards, 3 TD
Murray State	Passing	Jayden Johannsen	13/22, 139 yards, 3 INT
Murray State	Rushing	Q'Darryius Jennings	7 carries, 36 yards
Murray State	Receiving	J'Kalon Carter	4 receptions, 70 yards

=== at Southern Illinois ===
Game Twelve – Murray State Racers (1–10) at Southern Illinois Salukis (3–8) – Game summary

Quarter	1	2	3	4	Total
Racers	0	0	0	0	0
Salukis	13	28	14	7	62

at Saluki Stadium, Carbondale, Illinois

- Date: Saturday November 23, 2024
- Game time: 12:00 p.m. CST
- Game weather: Cloudy, 51 °F (11 °C)
- Game attendance: 5,310
- Referee: Tyler Downs
- TV: ESPN+

Game information
First quarter
- SIU – Paul Geelen 47-yard field goal, 7:33. Salukis 3–0. Drive: 6 plays, 57 yards, 2:26.
- SIU – Paul Geelen 39-yard field goal, 4:52. Salukis 6–0. Drive: 5 plays, 21 yards, 0:55.
- SIU – Bradley Clark 35-yard pass from Michael Lindauer (Paul Geelen kick), 1:30. Salukis 13–0. Drive: 1 play, 35 yards, 0:08.

Second quarter

- SIU – Keontez Lewis 4-yard pass from Michael Lindauer (Paul Geelen kick), 10:05. Salukis 20–0. Drive: 11 plays, 67 yards, 4:35.
- SIU – Nah'shawn Hezekiah 19-yard pass from Michael Lindauer (Paul Geelen kick), 8:02. Salukis 27–0. Drive: 3 plays, 38 yards, 1:19.
- SIU – Nah'shawn Hezekiah 35-yard pass from Michael Lindauer (Paul Geelen kick), 1:25. Salukis 34–0. Drive: 10 plays, 81 yards, 4:32.
- SIU – Keontez Lewis 65-yard pass from Michael Lindauer (Paul Geelen kick), 0:42. Salukis 41–0. Drive: 1 play, 65 yards, 0:09.

Third quarter

- SIU – Bradley Clark 23-yard pass from Michael Lindauer (Paul Geelen kick), 7:56. Salukis 48–0. Drive: 11 plays, 65 yards, 5:44.
- SIU – Jay Jones 1-yard pass from Michael Lindauer (Paul Geelen kick), 3:11. Salukis 55–0. Drive: 4 plays, 44 yards, 1:48.

Fourth quarter

- SIU – Jeremiah Baxter 5-yard run (Paul Geelen kick), 8:41. Salukis 62–0. Drive: 10 plays, 48 yards, 5:31.

Statistics	MURR	SIU
First downs	9	25
Total yards	185	529
Rushing yards	75	246
Passing yards	110	283
Turnovers	5	0
Time of possession	25:58	34:02

Team	Category	Player	Statistics
Murray State	Passing	Jayden Johannsen	7/11, 80 yards, 2 INT
Murray State	Rushing	Kywon Morgan	6 carries, 32 yards
Murray State	Receiving	J. K. Carter	4 receptions, 62 yards
Southern Illinois	Passing	Michael Lindauer	20/33, 283 yards, 7 TD
Southern Illinois	Rushing	Allen Middleton	15 carries, 124 yards
Southern Illinois	Receiving	Keontez Lewis	5 receptions, 104 yards, 2 TD
