= Dalys Beanum =

American football player (born 2002)

Dallas Renegades
- Position: Cornerback
- Roster status: Unsigned draft pick

Personal information
- Born: October 22, 2002 (age 24); St. Louis, Missouri, U.S.
- Listed height: 6 ft 1 in (1.85 m)
- Listed weight: 200 lb (91 kg)

Career information
- High school: Millard West (Omaha, Nebraska)
- College: South Dakota State (2020–2024)
- NFL draft: 2025: undrafted

Career history
- New Orleans Saints (2025–2026)*; Dallas Renegades (2027-present)
- * Offseason or practice squad member only

Awards and highlights
- 2× FCS national champion (2022, 2023); First-team FCS All-American (2024); First-team All-MVFC (2024)
- Stats at Pro Football Reference

Dalys Ryan Beanum (born October 22, 2002) is an American professional football cornerback. He played college football for the South Dakota State Jackrabbits.

== Early life ==
Beanum was born on October 22, 2002, in St. Louis, Missouri. He attended Millard West High School in Omaha, Nebraska where he played as a wide receiver and averaged 62 receiving yards a game and scored eight touchdowns as a senior. Beanum was also a first-team All-Metro and All-Nebraska selection. He committed to play college football at South Dakota State University.

== College career ==
Beanum played college football for the South Dakota State Jackrabbits from 2020 to 2024. He played in 67 games in his career, making 134 tackles, including 6.5 tackles for loss, 12 interceptions, 34 pass deflections, two forced fumbles, one fumble recovery and one blocked kick. In the 2023 NCAA Division I Football Championship Game, Beanum recorded a tackles and fumble recovery en route to a 45–21 victory over the North Dakota State Bison. South Dakota State made another appearance in the FCS Championship game the following year against the Montana Grizzlies, winning 23–3, where he had an interception.

Beanum also returned punts for the Jackrabbits in 2024, returning one for a touchdown against Southeastern Louisiana. In that same year, he was a first-team All-MVFC and FCS All-American with 46 tackles, one interception, four pass breakups and a forced fumble.

== Professional career ==
Pre-draft measurables
Height	Weight	Arm length	Hand span	Wingspan	40-yard dash	10-yard split	20-yard split	20-yard shuttle	Three-cone drill	Vertical jump	Broad jump	Bench press
6 ft 0 in (1.83 m)	195 lb (88 kg)	32 1/8 in (0.82 m)	9 3/8 in (0.24 m)	6 ft 2 1/2 in (1.89 m)	4.54 s	1.52 s	2.64 s	4.45 s	7.23 s	32.5 in (0.83 m)	9 ft 9 in (2.97 m)	6 reps
All values from Pro Day

After not being selected in the 2025 NFL draft, Beanum signed with the New Orleans Saints as an undrafted free agent. He was waived on August 26, 2025, before signing to the practice squad the following day. Beanum signed a reserve/future contract with New Orleans on January 5, 2026.

On August 30, 2026, Beanum was placed on injured reserve. On September 2, Beanum was released by New Orleans with an injury settlement. On November 19, 2026, Beanum was drafted in the 7th round (52nd overall) by the Dallas Renegades in the 2027 UFL draft.
