= JJ Galbreath =

American football player (born 2001)

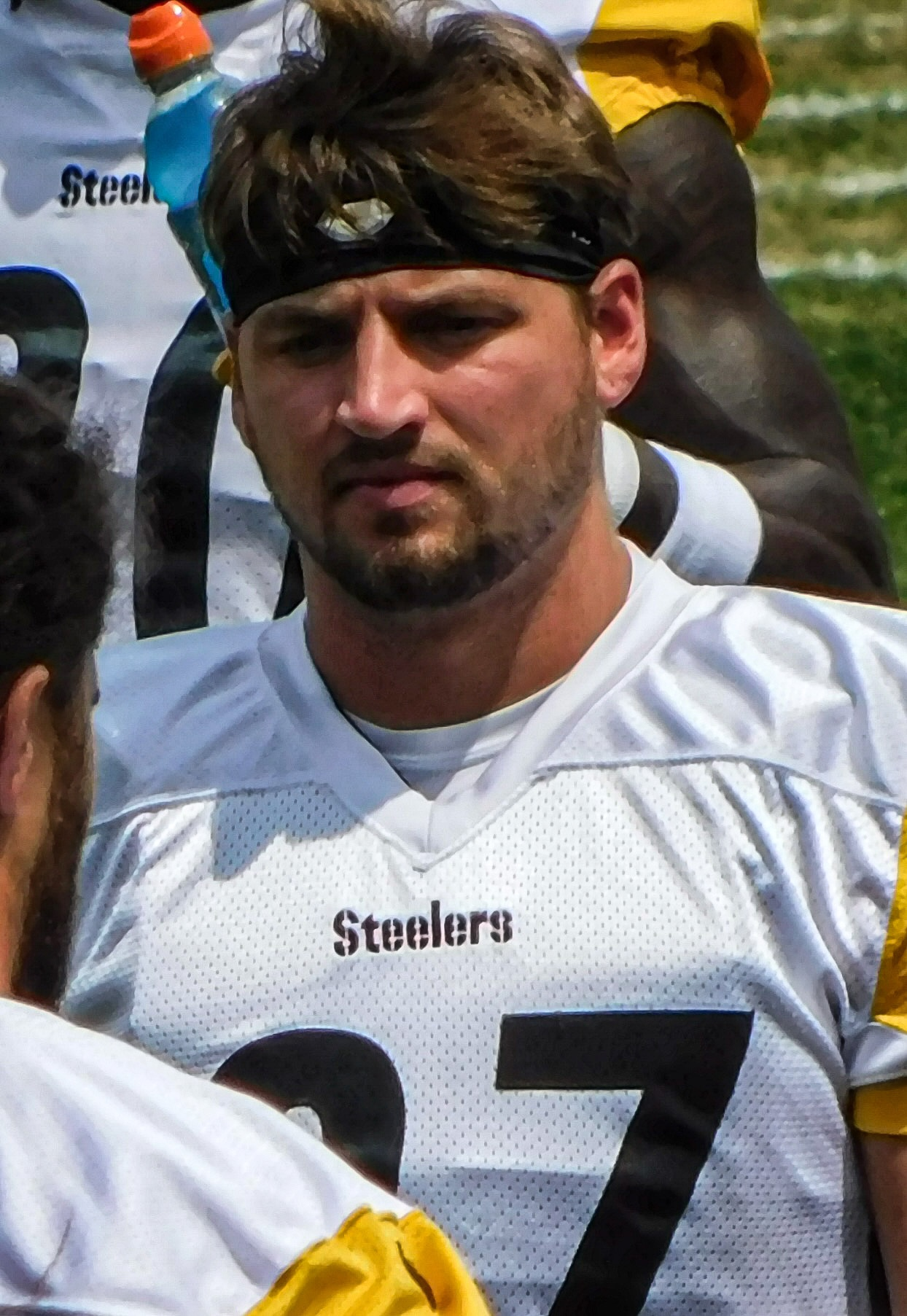
- Galbreath with the Pittsburgh Steelers in 2025

Profile
- Position: Tight end

Personal information
- Born: August 5, 2001 (age 25); Arvada, Colorado, U.S.
- Listed height: 6 ft 4 in (1.93 m)
- Listed weight: 231 lb (105 kg)

Career information
- High school: Ralston Valley (Arvada)
- College: South Dakota (2021–2024)
- NFL draft: 2025: undrafted

Career history
- Pittsburgh Steelers (2025)*; Indianapolis Colts (2026)*
- * Offseason or practice squad member only

Awards and highlights
- First-team All-MVFC (2024); First-team FCS All-American (2024)
- Stats at Pro Football Reference

JJ Galbreath (born August 5, 2001) is an American professional football tight end. He played college football for the South Dakota Coyotes.

== Early life ==
Galbreath attended high school at Ralston Valley located in Arvada, Colorado. Coming out of high school, he committed to play college football for the South Dakota Coyotes.

== College career ==
Galbreath finished his collegiate career at South Dakota from 2021 through 2024, hauling in 93 receptions for 1,355 yards and 12 touchdowns in 45 games, where he earned first-team AP all-American honors, and first-team all-Conference honors throughout his career. After the conclusion of the 2024 season, he declared for the 2025 NFL draft after earning all-American honors.

== Professional career ==
Pre-draft measurables
| Height | Weight | Arm length | Hand span | Wingspan | 40-yard dash | 10-yard split | 20-yard split | 20-yard shuttle | Three-cone drill | Vertical jump | Broad jump | Bench press |
|---|---|---|---|---|---|---|---|---|---|---|---|---|
| 6 ft 3 3/8 in (1.91 m) | 231 lb (105 kg) | 32 in (0.81 m) | 9 1/2 in (0.24 m) | 6 ft 6 3/8 in (1.99 m) | 4.68 s | 1.62 s | 2.67 s | 4.20 s | 6.82 s | 38.0 in (0.97 m) | 10 ft 3 in (3.12 m) | 12 reps |
All values from Pro Day

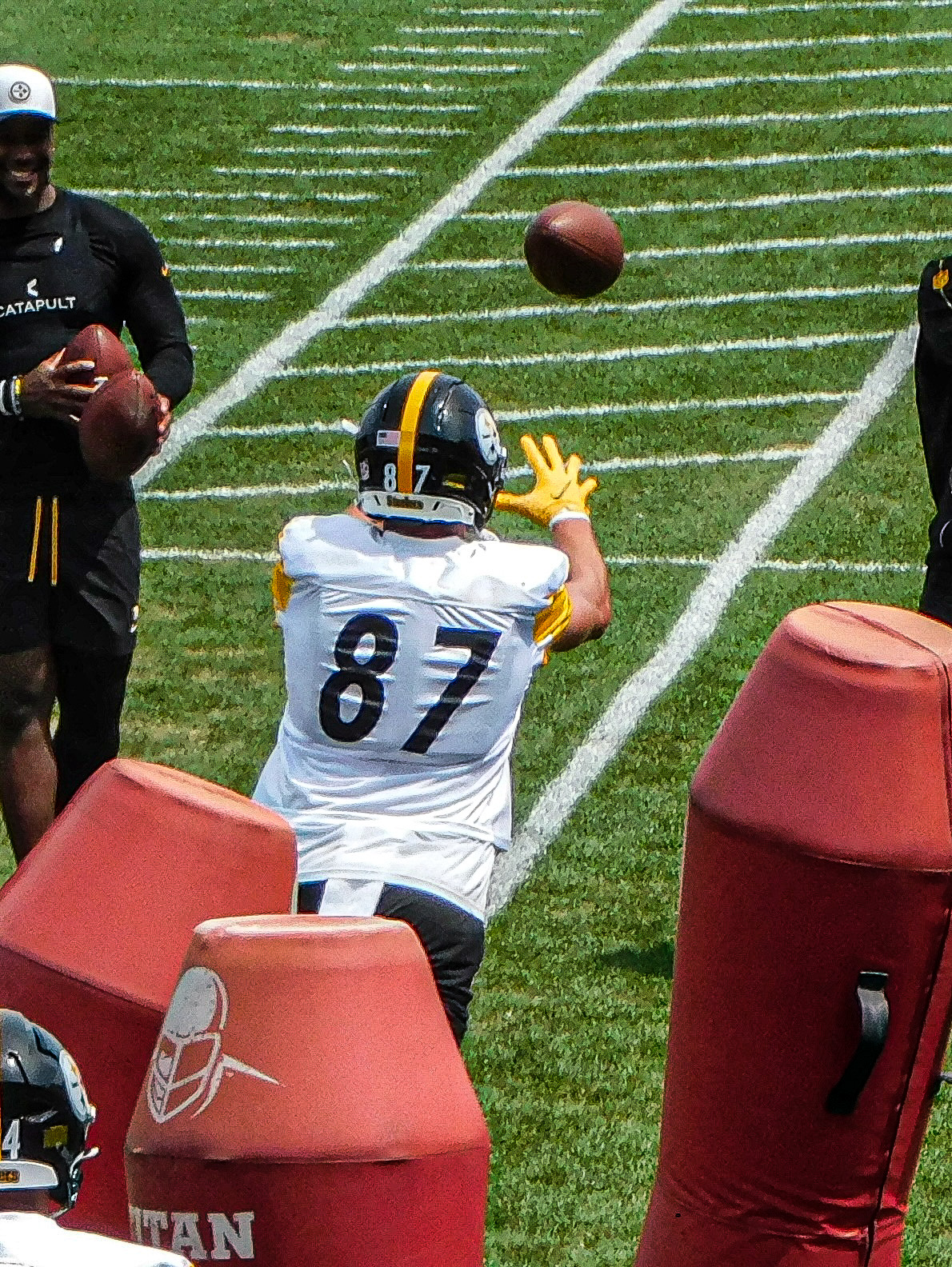
Galbreath during Steelers training camp in 2025

=== Pittsburgh Steelers ===
After not being selected in the 2025 NFL draft, Galbreath signed with the Pittsburgh Steelers as an undrafted free agent. He entered the 2025 offseason as one of the Steelers top UDFA's competing for a 53-man roster spot. Galbreath was waived on August 25, and re-signed to the practice squad. He was released on September 16.

Galbreath signed a reserve/future contract with Pittsburgh on January 23, 2026. On January 15, Galbreath was selected by the Orlando Storm in the 2026 UFL Draft. On August 7, Galbreath was waived by the Steelers.

=== Indianapolis Colts ===
On August 21, 2026, Galbreath signed with the Indianapolis Colts. On August 30, he was waived by Indianapolis as a part of final roster cuts.
