= Keondre Jackson =

American football player (born 2002)

No. 39 – Baltimore Ravens
- Position: Safety
- Roster status: Active

Personal information
- Born: May 2, 2002 (age 24); Freeport, Illinois, U.S.
- Listed height: 6 ft 2 in (1.88 m)
- Listed weight: 215 lb (98 kg)

Career information
- High school: Freeport (Freeport, Illinois)
- College: Illinois State (2021–2024)
- NFL draft: 2025: undrafted

Career history
- Baltimore Ravens (2025–present)

Awards and highlights
- First team All-MVFC (2024)

Career NFL statistics as of 2025
- Games played: 12
- Tackles: 13
- Forced fumbles: 1
- Fumble recoveries: 1
- Stats at Pro Football Reference

Keondre Jackson (born May 2, 2002) is an American professional football safety for the Baltimore Ravens of the National Football League (NFL). He played college football for the Illinois State Redbirds and was signed by the Ravens as an undrafted free agent in 2025.

== Early life ==
Jackson was born on May 2, 2002, in Freeport, Illinois. He attended Freeport High School where he competed in football and wrestling. There, he was a two-time first-team all-conference selection and led the conference in solo tackles as a senior. He initially enrolled at the University of Nebraska at Kearney in the fall of 2020 before transferring to Illinois State University after a semester.

At Illinois State, Jackson redshirted with the football team in the spring 2021 season, then posted 11 tackles and a sack in the fall 2021 season while appearing in 10 games. He started 10 games in 2022 and totaled 46 tackles and an interception. Jackson was named defensive team captain prior to the 2023 season. That year, he was named honorable mention All-Missouri Valley Football Conference (MVFC) recording a team-leading 76 tackles along with 6.5 tackles-for-loss (TFLs), three sacks and an interception. As a senior in 2024, Jackson was named first-team All-MVFC and honorable mention FCS All-American after posting 99 tackles and three interceptions, with his tackles ranking third in the conference. He was invited to the Hula Bowl and the 2025 Senior Bowl at the conclusion of his collegiate career, earning his team's award for best deep safety at the latter.

== Professional career ==
Pre-draft measurables
Height	Weight	Arm length	Hand span	Wingspan	40-yard dash	10-yard split	20-yard split	20-yard shuttle	Three-cone drill	Vertical jump	Broad jump	Bench press
6 ft 2 1/8 in (1.88 m)	207 lb (94 kg)	31 5/8 in (0.80 m)	9 1/4 in (0.23 m)	6 ft 7 3/8 in (2.02 m)	4.69 s	1.67 s	2.72 s	4.28 s	6.93 s	35.5 in (0.90 m)	10 ft 5 in (3.18 m)	15 reps
All values from Pro Day

After going unselected in the 2025 NFL draft, Jackson signed with the Baltimore Ravens as an undrafted free agent. He was waived on August 26, 2025, then re-signed to the practice squad the next day. Jackson was elevated to the active roster for the team's Week 6 game against the Los Angeles Rams. On November 4, he was signed to the active roster.
