= Jody Wright =

American football player and coach (born 1981)

Current position
- Title: Head coach
- Team: Murray State
- Conference: MVFC
- Record: 5–31

Biographical details
- Born: July 21, 1981 (age 45)

Playing career
- 2000–2002: Jacksonville State
- Position: Running back

Coaching career (HC unless noted)
- 2002–2004: Jacksonville State (SA)
- 2005: Mississippi State (volunteer)
- 2006–2008: Mississippi State (GA)
- 2010: Alabama (GA)
- 2011–2012: Alabama (off. analyst)
- 2013: Jacksonville State (TE/PGC/RC)
- 2014: UAB (AHC/RC/RB)
- 2018: UAB (AHC/RC/OL)
- 2019: Cleveland Browns (off. assistant)
- 2020: New York Giants (def. assistant)
- 2021: New York Giants (off. assistant)
- 2022–2023: South Carolina (TE)
- 2024–present: Murray State

Administrative career (AD unless noted)
- 2009: Mississippi State (DFO)
- 2015–2017: Alabama (DPP)

Head coaching record
- Overall: 5–31

Jody Wright (born July 21, 1981) is an American football coach and former player who is the head coach at Murray State. He played college football for the Jacksonville State Gamecocks and has coached them, the Mississippi State Bulldogs, Alabama Crimson Tide, UAB Blazers, Cleveland Browns, New York Giants, and South Carolina Gamecocks.

== Early life ==
Wright was born on July 21, 1981, and grew up in Ethelsville, Alabama. He attended Pickens Academy in Carrollton, Alabama, and played football there under his father who was the head coach. He helped them win state championships in 1996, 1998 and 1999 while playing running back; he was named an all-state player in his last two years. Wright attended Jacksonville State University and played running back for the football team starting in 2000. He graduated from the school with a bachelor's degree in 2005. He later received a master's degree from Mississippi State University in 2009.

== Coaching career ==
Wright began his coaching career at Jacksonville State in 2002 as a student assistant. After three seasons in that position, he joined the Mississippi State Bulldogs as a volunteer coach under Sylvester Croom in 2005. He started working with defensive coordinator Ellis Johnson at Mississippi State but quickly was shifted to working with the offense. He worked as a graduate assistant from 2006 to 2008 before moving up to director of football operations.

In 2010, Wright joined the Alabama Crimson Tide as a graduate assistant, then becoming an offensive analyst in 2011 and serving in that role through 2012. He helped the team compile a record of 35–5 in those years while winning two consecutive national championships in 2011 and 2012.

Wright returned to Jacksonville State in 2013, serving that year as their tight ends coach, passing game coordinator and recruiting coordinator while helping them reach the FCS playoffs. The following year, he was the assistant head coach, recruiting coordinator and running backs coach for the UAB Blazers, prior to the team being discontinued in 2015. In 2015, he returned to Alabama and was hired as director of player personnel. He helped them have a record of 41–3 in three years in the position, winning two national championships while helping the team have the top-ranked signing class each year. Wright was selected the 2016 FootballScoop Player Personnel Director of the Year.

In 2018, Wright served as the assistant head coach, recruiting coordinator and offensive line coach for the revived UAB Blazers. He entered the professional ranks by becoming an offensive assistant working with the running backs for the Cleveland Browns of the National Football League (NFL) in 2019. He then joined the New York Giants in 2020 as a defensive assistant working with the linebackers and switched to the running backs the following year. In 2022, he was hired by the South Carolina Gamecocks as tight ends coach.

After two years at South Carolina, Wright was hired as the head coach of the Murray State Racers in 2024.

== Head coaching record ==
Year	Team	Overall	Conference	Standing	Bowl/playoffs
Murray State Racers (Missouri Valley Football Conference) (2024–present)
2024	Murray State	1–11	0–8	11th	
2025	Murray State	1–11	1–7	T–8th	
2026	Murray State	3–9	2–6	8th	
Murray State:		5–31	3–21		
Total:		5–31			
