= 2024 Western Illinois Leathernecks football team =

American college football season

2024 Western Illinois Leathernecks football
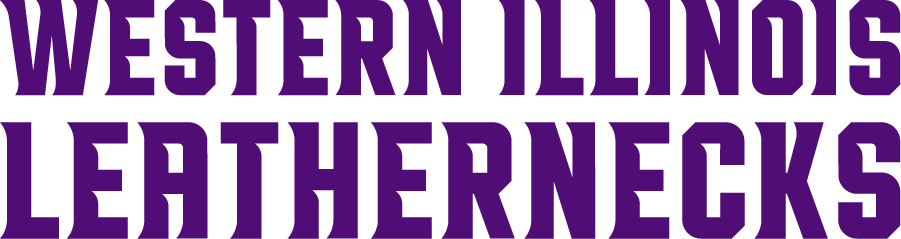
- Conference: Big South–OVC Football Association
- Record: 4–8 (3–5 Big South–OVC)
- Head coach: Joe Davis (1st season)
- Offensive coordinator: Brad Wilson (1st season)
- Defensive coordinator: Dan McKeown (1st season)
- Home stadium: Hanson Field

2024 Big South–OVC football standings
| | Conf. | | | Overall |
| Team | W | | L | W | | L |
|---|---|---|---|---|---|---|
| No. 16 Southeast Missouri State +^ | 6 | – | 2 | 9 | – | 4 |
| Tennessee Tech + | 6 | – | 2 | 7 | – | 5 |
| No. 17 UT Martin +^ | 6 | – | 2 | 9 | – | 5 |
| No. 19 Tennessee State +^ | 6 | – | 2 | 9 | – | 4 |
| Lindenwood* | 4 | – | 4 | 5 | – | 7 |
| Western Illinois | 3 | – | 5 | 4 | – | 8 |
| Gardner–Webb | 3 | – | 5 | 4 | – | 8 |
| Eastern Illinois | 2 | – | 6 | 3 | – | 9 |
| Charleston Southern | 0 | – | 8 | 1 | – | 11 |
+ – Conference co-champions; ^ – FCS playoff participant; Note: Lindenwood ineligible for Big South–OVC title and FCS postseason play due to transition from NCAA Division II.; Rankings from STATS Poll

The 2024 Western Illinois Leathernecks football team represented Western Illinois University as a member of the Big South–OVC Football Association during the 2024 NCAA Division I FCS football season. Led by first-year head coach Joe Davis the Leathernecks compiled an overall record of 4–8 with a mark of 3–5 in conference play, tying for sixth place in the Big South–OVC.

This was the team's first season as a member of the Ohio Valley Conference after leaving the Missouri Valley Football Conference (MFVC).

== Schedule ==
| Date | Time | Opponent | Site | TV | Result | Attendance |
|---|---|---|---|---|---|---|
| August 31 | 2:30 p.m. | at Northern Illinois* | Huskie Stadium; DeKalb, IL | ESPN+ | L 15–54 | 10,828 |
| September 6 | 6:00 p.m. | at Indiana* | Memorial Stadium; Bloomington, IN | BTN | L 3–77 | 39,082 |
| September 14 | 12:00 p.m. | at No. 18 Illinois State* | Hancock Stadium; Normal, IL | ESPN+ | L 34–51 | 12,440 |
| September 28 | 6:00 p.m. | McKendree (IL)* | Hanson Field; Macomb, IL | ESPN+ | W 49–32 | 4,827 |
| October 5 | 3:00 p.m. | at Charleston Southern | Buccaneer Field; North Charleston, SC | ESPN+ | W 31–20 | 4,015 |
| October 12 | 3:00 p.m. | UT Martin^{†} | Hanson Field; Macomb, IL | ESPN+ | L 17–45 | 3,264 |
| October 19 | 3:00 p.m. | Tennessee Tech | Hanson Field; Macomb, IL | ESPN+ | W 37–21 | 2,682 |
| October 26 | 2:00 p.m. | at Lindenwood | Harlen C. Hunter Stadium; St. Charles, MO | ESPN+ | L 49–38 | 3,697 |
| November 2 | 2:00 p.m. | at Eastern Illinois | O'Brien Field; Charleston, IL | ESPN+ | L 38–45 | 5,369 |
| November 9 | 1:00 p.m. | Tennessee State | Hanson Field; Macomb, IL | ESPN+ | L 20–45 | 1,459 |
| November 16 | 1:00 p.m. | at No. 12 Southeast Missouri State | Houck Stadium; Cape Girardeau, MO | ESPN+ | L 45–54 | 4,839 |
| November 23 | 1:00 p.m. | Gardner–Webb | Hanson Field; Macomb, IL | ESPN+ | W 45–28 | 2,021 |
*Non-conference game; ^{†}Homecoming; Rankings from STATS Poll released prior to the game; All times are in Central time

== Preseason ==
=== Preseason poll ===
The Big South-OVC Conference released their preseason poll on July 17, 2024. The Leathernecks were picked to finish last in the conference.

== Game summaries ==
=== at Northern Illinois ===
Game One – Western Illinois Leathernecks (0–0) at Northern Illinois Huskies (0–0) – Game summary

| Quarter | 1 | 2 | 3 | 4 | Total |
|---|---|---|---|---|---|
| Leathernecks | 3 | 0 | 5 | 7 | 15 |
| Huskies | 6 | 28 | 13 | 7 | 54 |

at Huskie Stadium, DeKalb, Illinois

- Date: Saturday August 31, 2024
- Game time: 2:30 p.m. CDT
- Game weather: Sunny, 81 °F (27 °C)
- Game attendance: 10,828
- Referee: Amanda Sauer
- TV announcers (ESPN+): Kelsie Kasper (play-by-play) and Ryan Cavanaugh (analyst)

Game information

First quarter

- NIU – Dane Pardridge 23-yard pass from Ethan Hampton (kick failed), 12:21. Huskies 6–0. Drive: 2 plays, 46 yards, 0:25.
- WIU – Antonio Chadha 44-yard field goal, 0:51. Huskies 6–3. Drive: 11 plays, 61, yards, 4:35.

Second quarter

- NIU – Cam Thompson 11-yard pass from Ethan Hampton (Kanon Woodill kick), 12:36. Huskies 13–3. Drive: 8 plays, 75 yards, 3:15.
- NIU – Trayvon Rudolph 60-yard run (Kanon Woodill kick), 8:47. Huskies 20–3. Drive: 1 play, 60 yards, 0:08.
- NIU – Keyshaun Pipkin 11-yard pass from Ethan Hampton (Kanon Woodill kick), 1:55. Huskies 27–3. Drive: 9 plays, 68 yards, 5:05.
- NIU – Trayvon Rudolph 43-yard pass from Ethan Hampton (Kanon Woodill kick), 0:40. Huskies 34–3. Drive: 4 plays, 60 yards, 0:44.

Third quarter

- NIU – Grayson Barnes 60-yard pass from Ethan Hampton (Kanon Woodill kick), 13:28. Huskies 41–3. Drive: 3 plays, 75 yards, 1:32.
- NIU – Jaylen Poe 7-yard run (kick blocked), 4:22. Huskies 47–3. Drive: 14 plays, 88 yards, 7:06.
- WIU – Fredrik Greenhoward defensive PAT conversion, 4:22. Huskies 47–5.
- WIU – Antonio Chadha 46-yard field goal, 1:39. Huskies 47–8. Drive: 8 plays, 50 yards, 2:36.

Fourth quarter

- NIU – Jalen Macon 5-yard run (Kanon Woodill kick), 8:00. Huskies 54–8. Drive: 12 plays, 64 yards, 5:31.
- WIU – Torrance Farmer Jr. 27-yard pass from Nathan Lamb (Antonio Chadha kick), 2:59. Huskies 54–15. Drive: 9 plays, 81 yards, 4:56.

| Statistics | WIU | NIU |
|---|---|---|
| First downs | 17 | 30 |
| Total yards | 298 | 706 |
| Rushing yards | 94 | 312 |
| Passing yards | 204 | 394 |
| Turnovers | 0 | 1 |
| Time of possession | 28:26 | 31:34 |

| Team | Category | Player | Statistics |
|---|---|---|---|
| Western Illinois | Passing | Nathan Lamb | 17/29, 204 yards, TD |
| Western Illinois | Rushing | Cameren Smith | 14 rushes, 51 yards |
| Western Illinois | Receiving | Tristin Duncan | 5 receptions, 68 yards |
| Northern Illinois | Passing | Ethan Hampton | 18/20, 328 yards, 5 TD |
| Northern Illinois | Rushing | Antario Brown | 8 rushes, 69 yards |
| Northern Illinois | Receiving | Trayvon Rudolph | 4 receptions, 104 yards, TD |

=== at Indiana (FBS) ===
Game Two – Western Illinois Leathernecks (0–1) at Indiana Hoosiers (FBS) (1–0) – Game summary

| Quarter | 1 | 2 | 3 | 4 | Total |
|---|---|---|---|---|---|
| Leathernecks | 0 | 3 | 0 | 0 | 3 |
| Hoosiers (FBS) | 28 | 14 | 14 | 21 | 77 |

at Memorial Stadium • Bloomington, Indiana

- Date: Friday September 6, 2024
- Game time: 6:00 p.m. CDT
- Game weather: Cloudy • Temperature: 73 °F (23 °C) • Wind: N at 10 miles per hour (16 km/h)
- Game attendance: 39,082
- Referee: Jeremy Valentine
- TV announcers (BTN): Lisa Byington (play-by-play), Jeremy ‘J’ Leman (analyst), and Melanie Ricks (sideline)

Game information

First quarter

- 12:53 IND - Andison Coby 38-yard pass from Kurtis Rourke, (Nicolas Radicic kick) (Drive: 5 plays, 68 yards, 01:58; Indiana 7–0)
- 09:30 IND - Justice Ellison 2-yard run (Nicolas Radicic kick) (Drive: 5 plays, 53 yards, 02:22; Indiana 14–0)
- 07:41 IND - Elijah Sarratt 71-yard pass from Kurtis Rourke, (Nicolas Radicic kick) (Drive: 1 plays, 71 yards, 00:09; Indiana 21–0)
- 02:03 IND - Ty Son Lawton 19-yard run (Nicolas Radicic kick) (Drive: 7 plays, 72 yards, 04:11; Indiana 28–0)

Second quarter

- 09:40 IND - Elijah Green 11-yard run (Nicolas Radicic kick) (Drive: 9 plays, 67 yards, 04:33; Indiana 35–0)
- 02:27 IND - Kurtis Rourke 1-yard run (Nicolas Radicic kick) (Drive: 10 plays, 60 yards, 05:13; Indiana 42–0)
- 00:30 WIU - Antonio Chadha 31-yard field goal (Drive: 12 plays, 69 yards, 01:50; Indiana 42–3)

Third quarter

- 8:58 IND - Justice Ellison 47-yard run (Nicolas Radicic kick) (Drive: 4 plays, 69 yards, 01:36; Indiana 49–3)
- 1:02 IND - Tayven Jackson 13-yard run (Nicolas Radicic kick) (Drive: 7 plays, 63 yards, 03:46; Indiana 56–3)

Fourth quarter

- 13:34 IND - Omar Cooper Jr. 69-yard pass from Tayven Jackson, (Nicolas Radicic kick) (Drive: 2 plays, 74 yards, 00:45; Indiana 63–3)
- 11:29 IND - Rolijah Hardy 12-yard interception return (Nicolas Radicic kick) (Drive: 1 plays, 0 yards, 00:06; Indiana 70–3)
- 9:10 IND - Charlie Becker 3-yard run (Nicolas Radicic kick) (Drive: 3 plays, 10 yards, 01:23; Indiana 77–3)

| Statistics | WIU | IU |
|---|---|---|
| First downs | 8 | 33 |
| Total yards | 121 | 701 |
| Rushing yards | 12 | 323 |
| Passing yards | 109 | 378 |
| Passing: Comp–Att–Int | 13–26–2 | 19–21–0 |
| Time of possession | 25:29 | 34:31 |

| Team | Category | Player | Statistics |
|---|---|---|---|
| Western Illinois | Passing | Nathan Lamb | 13/25, 109 yards, 2 INT |
| Western Illinois | Rushing | Torrance Farmer Jr. | 5 carries, 20 yards |
| Western Illinois | Receiving | Christian Anaya | 5 receptions, 56 yards |
| Indiana | Passing | Kurtis Rourke | 15/17, 268 yards, 2 TD |
| Indiana | Rushing | Justice Ellison | 9 carries, 117 yards, 2 TD |
| Indiana | Receiving | Elijah Sarratt | 6 receptions, 137 yards, TD |

=== at No. 18 Illinois State ===
Game Three – Western Illinois Leathernecks (0–2) vs No. 18 Illinois State Redbirds (1–1) – Game summary

| Quarter | 1 | 2 | 3 | 4 | Total |
|---|---|---|---|---|---|
| Leathernecks | 7 | 14 | 7 | 6 | 34 |
| No. 18 Redbirds | 14 | 10 | 14 | 13 | 51 |

at Hancock Stadium • Normal, IL

- Date: September 14, 2024
- Game time: 12:00 p.m.
- Game weather: Sunny, 82 °F (28 °C)
- Game attendance: 12,440
- Referee: Jason Perkins
- TV announcers (ESPN+): TBD

Game information

First quarter

- (13:50) ILST – Xavier Loyd 59-yard pass from Tommy Rittenhouse (Ian Wagner kick) (Drive: 4 plays, 75 yards, 1:10; ILST 7-0)
- (8:30) ILST – Tommy Rittenhouse 6-yard rush (Ian Wagner kick) (Drive: 6 plays, 46 yards, 2:10; ILST 14-0)
- (4:26) WIU – Nathan Lamb 6-yard rush (Antonio Chadha kick) (Drive: 9 plays, 75 yards, 4:04; ILST 14-7)

Second quarter

- (12:35) WIU – Christian Anaya 3-yard pass from Nathan Lamb (Antonio Chadha kick) (Drive: 11 plays, 95 yards, 5:36; Tie 14-14)
- (10:36) ILST – Jake Rubley 1-yard rush (Ian Wagner kick) (Drive: 6 plays, 34 yards, 1:58; ILST 21-14)
- (5:25) WIU – Nathan Lamb 6-yard rush (Antonio Chadha kick) (Drive: 11 plays, 76 yards, 5:05; Tie 21-21)
- (2:42) ILST – Ian Wagner 21-yard field goal (Drive: 9 plays, 65 yards, 2:43; ILST 24-21)

Third quarter

- (11:55) ILST – Lavoise-Deontae McCoy 58-yard blocked field goal return (Ian Wagner kick) (ILST 31-21)
- (7:36) WIU – Nathan Lamb 2-yard rush (Antonio Chadha kick) (Drive: 10 plays, 60 yards, 4:19; ILST 31-28)
- (3:52) ILST – Wenkers Wright 3-yard rush (Ian Wagner kick) (Drive: 11 plays, 88 yards, 3:40; ILST 38-28)

Fourth quarter

- (12:28) ILST – Daniel Sobkowicz 23-yard rush (Drive: 9 play, 54 yards, 3:06; ILST 44-28)
- (3:27) ILST – Matt Lawson 4-yard rush (Ian Wagner kick) (Drive: 2 plays, 9 yards, 0:43; ILST 51-28)
- (0:02) ILST – Eli Aragon 3-yard pass from Chris Irvin (Drive: 13 plays, 65 yards, 3:25; ILST 51-34)

| Statistics | WIU | ILST |
|---|---|---|
| First downs | 31 | 21 |
| Total yards | 503 | 390 |
| Rushing yards | 186 | 189 |
| Passing yards | 317 | 201 |
| Passing: Comp–Att–Int | 31–43–1 | 16–25–0 |
| Time of possession | 38:33 | 21:27 |

| Team | Category | Player | Statistics |
|---|---|---|---|
| Western Illinois | Passing | Nathan Lamb | 24/34, 269 yards, 1 TD, 1 INT |
| Western Illinois | Rushing | Cameren Smith | 20 carries, 77 yards |
| Western Illinois | Receiving | Matthew Henry | 7 receptions, 124 yards |
| Illinois State | Passing | Tommy Rittenhouse | 16/22, 201 yards, 2 TD |
| Illinois State | Rushing | Wenkers Wright | 16 carries, 106 yards, 1 TD |
| Illinois State | Receiving | Xavier Loyd | 4 receptions, 85 yards, 1 TD |

=== McKendree (DII) ===
Game Four – McKendree Bearcats (DII) (2–1) vs Western Illinois Leathernecks (0–3) – Game summary

| Quarter | 1 | 2 | 3 | 4 | Total |
|---|---|---|---|---|---|
| Bearcats (DII) | 3 | 6 | 3 | 20 | 32 |
| Leathernecks | 7 | 14 | 14 | 14 | 49 |

at Hanson Field • Macomb, IL

- Date: September 28, 2024
- Game time: 6:00 p.m.
- Game weather: Cloudy
- Game attendance: 4,827
- Referee: Tremain Williams
- TV announcers (ESPN+): TBD

Game information

First quarter
Second quarter
Third quarter
Fourth quarter

| Statistics | MCK | WIU |
|---|---|---|
| First downs | 27 | 24 |
| Total yards | 402 | 495 |
| Rushing yards | 203 | 273 |
| Passing yards | 199 | 222 |
| Passing: Comp–Att–Int | 21–40–0 | 16–21–0 |
| Time of possession | 34:00 | 26:00 |

| Team | Category | Player | Statistics |
|---|---|---|---|
| McKendree | Passing | Ty Michael | 18/37, 176 yards |
| McKendree | Rushing | Eddie Clark | 20 carries, 139 yards, 3 TD |
| McKendree | Receiving | Kendall Abdur-Rahman | 4 receptions, 65 yards |
| Western Illinois | Passing | Nathan Lamb | 14/19, 193 yards, 1 TD |
| Western Illinois | Rushing | Cameren Smith | 23 carries, 199 yards, 2 TD |
| Western Illinois | Receiving | Demari Davis | 2 receptions, 85 yards, 1 TD |

=== at Charleston Southern ===
Game Five – Western Illinois Leathernecks (1–3) vs Charleston Southern Buccaneers (1–3) – Game summary

| Quarter | 1 | 2 | 3 | 4 | Total |
|---|---|---|---|---|---|
| Leathernecks | 14 | 7 | 7 | 3 | 31 |
| Buccaneers | 0 | 13 | 0 | 7 | 20 |

at Buccaneer Field • North Charleston, SC

- Date: Saturday October 5, 2024
- Game time: 4:00 p.m.
- Game weather: Sunny, 81 °F (27 °C)
- Game attendance: 4,014
- Referee: John Kellermeier
- TV announcers (ESPN+): Justin Biegel (play-by-play) and Jack Delongchamps (analyst)

Game information

First quarter
Second quarter
Third quarter
Fourth quarter

| Statistics | WIU | CHSO |
|---|---|---|
| First downs | 17 | 21 |
| Total yards | 329 | 431 |
| Rushing yards | 132 | 325 |
| Passing yards | 197 | 106 |
| Passing: Comp–Att–Int | 17–23–1 | 9–17–2 |
| Time of possession | 23:28 | 36:32 |

| Team | Category | Player | Statistics |
|---|---|---|---|
| Western Illinois | Passing | Nathan Lamb | 17/23, 197 yards, 2 TD, 1 INT |
| Western Illinois | Rushing | Cameren Smith | 25 carries, 101 yards, 1 TD |
| Western Illinois | Receiving | Elijah Aragon | 10 receptions, 129 yards, 1 TD |
| Charleston Southern | Passing | Rob McCoy Jr | 9/17, 106 yards, 1 TD, 2 INT |
| Charleston Southern | Rushing | Autavius Ison | 29 carries, 229 yards, 2 TD |
| Charleston Southern | Receiving | Noah Jennings | 4 receptions, 44 yards, 1 TD |

=== UT Martin ===
Game Six – UT Martin Skyhawks (3–3) vs Western Illinois Leathernecks (2–3) – Game summary

| Quarter | 1 | 2 | 3 | 4 | Total |
|---|---|---|---|---|---|
| Skyhawks | 14 | 14 | 14 | 3 | 45 |
| Leathernecks | 3 | 0 | 0 | 14 | 17 |

at Hanson Field • Macomb, IL

- Date: Saturday October 12, 2024
- Game time: 3:00 p.m.
- Game weather: Sunny, 85 °F (29 °C)
- Game attendance: 3,264
- Referee: Matthew Jones
- TV: ESPN+

Game information

First quarter

- (13:57) UTM – Max Dowling 48 yard pass from Kinkead Dent, Jaren Van Winkle kick (Drive: 3 plays, 75 yards, 1:03; UTM 7–0)
- (5:16) WIU – Antonio Chadha 47 yard field goal (Drive: 10 plays, 61 yards, 3:51; UTM 7–3)
- (1:00) UTM – Kinkead Dent 1 yard run, Jaren Van Winkle kick (Drive: 10 plays, 72 yards, 4:10; UTM 14–3)

Second quarter

- (10:59) UTM – Glover Cook III 33 yard run, Jaren Van Winkle kick (Drive: 7 plays, 69 yards, 3:44; UTM 21–3)
- (5:51) UTM – Max Dowling 21 yard pass from Kinkead Dent, Jaren Van Winkle kick (Drive: 4 plays, 86 yards, 2:12; UTM 28–3)

Third quarter

- (6:12) UTM – Patrick Smith 10 yard run, Jaren Van Winkle kick (Drive: 7 plays, 61 yards, 3:35; UTM 35–3)
- (2:46) UTM – Kinkead Dent 5 yard run, Jaren Van Winkle kick (Drive: 5 plays, 25 yards, 2:15; UTM 42–3)

Fourth quarter

- (12:29) UTM – Jaren Van Winkle 23 yard field goal (Drive: 9 plays, 60 yards, 3:14; UTM 45–3)
- (8:11) WIU – Cameren Smith 2 yard run, Antonio Chadha kick (Drive: 11 plays, 75 yards, 4:18; UTM 45–10)
- (0:31) WIU – Demari Davis 20 yard pass from Chris Irvin, Antonio Chadha kick (Drive: 9 plays, 65 yards, 1:25; UTM 45–17)

| Statistics | UTM | WIU |
|---|---|---|
| First downs | 27 | 18 |
| Total yards | 541 | 294 |
| Rushing yards | 306 | 40 |
| Passing yards | 235 | 254 |
| Passing: Comp–Att–Int | 20–28–1 | 27–49–0 |
| Time of possession | 32:09 | 27:51 |

| Team | Category | Player | Statistics |
|---|---|---|---|
| UT Martin | Passing | Kinkead Dent | 16/21, 194 yards, 2 TD |
| UT Martin | Rushing | Patrick Smith | 17 carries, 145 yards, TD |
| UT Martin | Receiving | Max Dowling | 3 receptions, 88 yards, 2 TD |
| Western Illinois | Passing | Nathan Lamb | 20/33, 158 yards |
| Western Illinois | Rushing | Cameren Smith | 13 carries, 27 yards, TD |
| Western Illinois | Receiving | Tristin Duncan | 4 receptions, 45 yards |

=== Tennessee Tech ===
Game Seven – Tennessee Tech Golden Eagles (2–4) vs Western Illinois Leathernecks (2–4) – Game summary

| Quarter | 1 | 2 | 3 | 4 | Total |
|---|---|---|---|---|---|
| Golden Eagles | 7 | 7 | 0 | 7 | 21 |
| Leathernecks | 10 | 21 | 3 | 3 | 37 |

at Hanson Field • Macomb, IL

- Date: Saturday October 19, 2024
- Game time: 3:00 p.m.
- Game weather: Sunny, 75 °F (24 °C)
- Game attendance: 2,682
- Referee: Brad Carre
- TV announcers (ESPN+): TBD

Game information

First quarter
Second quarter
Third quarter
Fourth quarter

| Statistics | TNTC | WIU |
|---|---|---|
| First downs | 17 | 26 |
| Total yards | 330 | 446 |
| Rushing yards | 68 | 186 |
| Passing yards | 262 | 260 |
| Passing: Comp–Att–Int | 23–34–2 | 15–24–0 |
| Time of possession | 22:13 | 37:47 |

| Team | Category | Player | Statistics |
|---|---|---|---|
| Tennessee Tech | Passing | Dylan Laible | 23/33, 262 yds, 1 TD, 2 INT |
| Tennessee Tech | Rushing | Jalen Mitchell | 7 carries, 86 yards, 2 TD |
| Tennessee Tech | Receiving | D.J. Linkins | 7 receptions, 84 yards |
| Western Illinois | Passing | Nathan Lamb | 15/24, 260 yds, 2 TD |
| Western Illinois | Rushing | Nathan Lamb | 17 carries, 90 yards, 1 TD |
| Western Illinois | Receiving | Matthew Henry | 6 receptions, 181 yards, 1 TD |

=== at Lindenwood ===
Game Eight – Western Illinois Leathernecks (3–4) vs Lindenwood Lions (3–5) – Game summary

| Quarter | 1 | 2 | 3 | 4 | Total |
|---|---|---|---|---|---|
| Leathernecks | 7 | 10 | 14 | 7 | 38 |
| Lions | 14 | 7 | 14 | 14 | 49 |

at Harlen C. Hunter Stadium • St. Charles, MO

- Date: Saturday October 26, 2024
- Game time: 2:00 p.m.
- Game weather: Sunny, 64 °F (18 °C)
- Game attendance: 3,697
- Referee: Michael Frain
- TV announcers (ESPN+): TBD

Game information

First quarter
Second quarter
Third quarter
Fourth quarter

| Statistics | WIU | LIN |
|---|---|---|
| First downs | 37 | 24 |
| Total yards | 713 | 572 |
| Rushing yards | 149 | 389 |
| Passing yards | 564 | 183 |
| Passing: Comp–Att–Int | 42–55–0 | 11–16–0 |
| Time of possession | 36:06 | 23:54 |

| Team | Category | Player | Statistics |
|---|---|---|---|
| Western Illinois | Passing | Nathan Lamb | 42/55, 564 yards, 5 TD |
| Western Illinois | Rushing | Cameren Smith | 17 carries, 67 yards |
| Western Illinois | Receiving | Matthew Henry | 15 receptions, 226 yards, 1 TD |
| Lindenwood | Passing | Nate Glantz | 11/16, 183 yards, 2 TD |
| Lindenwood | Rushing | Steve Hall | 13 carries, 259 yards, 4 TD |
| Lindenwood | Receiving | Abe Haerr | 1 reception, 57 yards |

=== at Eastern Illinois ===
Game Nine – Western Illinois Leathernecks (3–5) vs Eastern Illinois Panthers (1–7) – Game summary

| Quarter | 1 | 2 | 3 | 4 | Total |
|---|---|---|---|---|---|
| Leathernecks | 0 | 17 | 7 | 14 | 38 |
| Panthers | 7 | 10 | 14 | 14 | 45 |

at O'Brien Field • Charleston, IL

- Date: Saturday November 2, 2024
- Game time: 2:00 p.m.
- Game weather: Sunny, 61 °F (16 °C)
- Game attendance: 5,369
- Referee: Michael Lennie
- TV announcers (ESPN+): Mike Bradd (play-by-play) and Dave Kidwell (analyst)

Game information

First quarter
Second quarter
Third quarter
Fourth quarter

| Statistics | WIU | EIU |
|---|---|---|
| First downs | 24 | 22 |
| Total yards | 395 | 534 |
| Rushing yards | 86 | 196 |
| Passing yards | 309 | 338 |
| Passing: Comp–Att–Int | 29–43–0 | 19–27–0 |
| Time of possession | 30:30 | 29:30 |

| Team | Category | Player | Statistics |
|---|---|---|---|
| Western Illinois | Passing | Nathan Lamb | 29/43, 309 yards, 3 TD |
| Western Illinois | Rushing | Cameren Smith | 17 carries, 66 yards, 1 TD |
| Western Illinois | Receiving | Elijah Aragon | 9 receptions, 83 yards, 1 TD |
| Eastern Illinois | Passing | Pierce Holley | 19/27, 338 yards, 5 TD |
| Eastern Illinois | Rushing | MJ Flowers | 27 carries, 194 yards, 1 TD |
| Eastern Illinois | Receiving | Alex Ginnever | 6 receptions, 100 yards, 2 TD |

=== Tennessee State ===
Game Ten – Tennessee State Tigers (6–3) vs Western Illinois Leathernecks (3–6) – Game summary

| Quarter | 1 | 2 | 3 | 4 | Total |
|---|---|---|---|---|---|
| Tigers | 14 | 14 | 7 | 10 | 45 |
| Leathernecks | 0 | 13 | 0 | 7 | 20 |

at Hanson Field • Macomb, IL

- Date: November 9, 2024
- Game time: 1:00 p.m.
- Game weather: Rain, 56 °F (13 °C)
- Game attendance: 1,459
- Referee: Michael Frain
- TV announcers (ESPN+): TBD

Game information

First quarter
Second quarter
Third quarter
Fourth quarter

| Statistics | TNST | WIU |
|---|---|---|
| First downs | 23 | 27 |
| Total yards | 376 | 432 |
| Rushing yards | 188 | 148 |
| Passing yards | 188 | 284 |
| Passing: Comp–Att–Int | 12–19–1 | 27–50–1 |
| Time of possession | 27:02 | 27:16 |

| Team | Category | Player | Statistics |
|---|---|---|---|
| Tennessee State | Passing | Draylen Ellis | 12/19, 188 yds, 2 TD, 1 INT |
| Tennessee State | Rushing | Tevin Carter | 8 carries, 51 yards, 2 TD |
| Tennessee State | Receiving | Bryant Williams | 3 receptions, 56 yards, 1 TD |
| Western Illinois | Passing | Nathan Lamb | 24/45, 266 yds, 1 TD |
| Western Illinois | Rushing | Nathan Lamb | 13 carries, 74 yards, 1 TD |
| Western Illinois | Receiving | Demari Davis | 2 receptions, 62 yards |

=== at No. 12 Southeast Missouri State ===
Game Eleven – Western Illinois Leathernecks (3–7) vs No. 12 Southeast Missouri State Redhawks (8–2) – Game summary

| Quarter | 1 | 2 | 3 | 4 | Total |
|---|---|---|---|---|---|
| Leathernecks | 14 | 13 | 6 | 12 | 45 |
| No. 12 Redhawks | 10 | 21 | 13 | 10 | 54 |

at Houck Stadium • Cape Girardeau, MO

- Date: Saturday November 16, 2024
- Game time: 1:00 p.m.
- Game weather: Sunny, 60 °F (16 °C)
- Game attendance: 4,839
- Referee: Matthew Jones
- TV announcers (ESPN+): TBD

Game information

First quarter

- (7:44) SEMO – Brandon Epton Jr. 21 yard pass from Paxton DeLaurent, DC Pippin kick (Drive: 3 plays, 41 yards, 0:27; SEMO 7–0)
- (5:25) WIU – Brandon Lanier 16 yard pass from Nathan Lamb, Antonio Chadha kick (Drive: 5 plays, 75 yards, 2:19; TIED 7–7)
- (3:09) SEMO – DC Pippin 43 yard field goal (Drive: 6 plays, 41 yards, 2:11; SEMO 10–7)
- (1:17) WIU – Cameren Smith 81 yard pass from Nathan Lamb, Antonio Chadha kick (Drive: 5 plays, 99 yards, 1:43; WIU 14–7)

Second quarter

- (12:17) SEMO – Cam Pedro 39 yard pass from Paxton DeLaurent, DC Pippin kick (Drive: 8 plays, 77 yards, 3:55; SEMO 17–14)
- (8:36) WIU – Demari Davis 29 yard pass from Tanner Zolnosky, Antonio Chadha kick (Drive: 8 plays, 75 yards, 3:41; WIU 21–17)
- (7:00) WIU – Antonio Chadha 46 yard field goal (Drive: 4 plays, 1 yard, 1:28; WIU 24–17)
- (2:05) SEMO – Paxton DeLaurent 10 yard run, DC Pippin kick (Drive: 8 plays, 75 yards, 4:55; TIED 24–24)
- (1:08) SEMO – Tristan Smith 17 yard pass from Paxton DeLaurent, DC Pippin kick (Drive: 5 plays, 55 yards, 0:27; SEMO 31–24)
- (0:00) WIU – Antonio Chadha 50 yard field goal (Drive: 8 plays, 42 yards, 1:08; SEMO 31–27)

Third quarter

- (13:09) SEMO – Dorian Anderson 48 yard pass from Paxton DeLaurent, DC Pippin kick (Drive: 4 plays, 70 yards, 1:46; SEMO 38–27)
- (7:23) SEMO – DC Pippin 20 yard field goal (Drive: 11 plays, 46 yards, 4:33; SEMO 41–27)
- (6:26) WIU – Matthew Henry 81 yard pass from Nathan Lamb (Drive: 2 plays, 84 yards, 0:51; SEMO 41–33)
- (2:22) SEMO – DC Pippin 40 yard field goal (Drive: 9 plays, 23 yards, 3:53; SEMO 44–33)

Fourth quarter

- (12:21) WIU – Cameren Smith 3 yard run (Drive: 10 plays, 75 yards, 5:01; SEMO 44–39)
- (5:35) SEMO – Brandon Epton Jr. 5 yard run, DC Pippin kick (Drive: 11 plays, 87 yards, 5:40; SEMO 51–39)
- (2:48) SEMO – DC Pippin 34 yard field goal (Drive: 6 plays, 27 yards, 2:35; SEMO 54–39)
- (1:13) WIU – Torrance Farmer Jr. 2 yard run (Drive: 10 plays, 68 yards, 1:35; SEMO 54–45)

| Statistics | WIU | SEMO |
|---|---|---|
| First downs | 25 | 33 |
| Total yards | 593 | 559 |
| Rushing yards | 93 | 192 |
| Passing yards | 500 | 367 |
| Passing: Comp–Att–Int | 27–42–3 | 24–39–1 |
| Time of possession | 26:09 | 33:51 |

| Team | Category | Player | Statistics |
|---|---|---|---|
| Western Illinois | Passing | Nathan Lamb | 24/39, 449 yds, 3 TD, 3 INT |
| Western Illinois | Rushing | Cameren Smith | 17 carries, 84 yards, 1 TD |
| Western Illinois | Receiving | Matthew Henry | 7 receptions, 183 yards, 1 TD |
| Southeast Missouri State | Passing | Paxton DeLaurent | 24/39, 367 yds, 4 TD, 1 INT |
| Southeast Missouri State | Rushing | Brandon Epton Jr. | 22 carries, 126 yards, 1 TD |
| Southeast Missouri State | Receiving | Dorian Anderson | 5 receptions, 116 yards, 1 TD |

=== Gardner–Webb ===
Game Twelve – Gardner–Webb Runnin' Bulldogs (4–7) vs Western Illinois Leathernecks (3–8) – Game summary

| Quarter | 1 | 2 | 3 | 4 | Total |
|---|---|---|---|---|---|
| Runnin' Bulldogs | 7 | 7 | 14 | 0 | 28 |
| Leathernecks | 7 | 7 | 14 | 17 | 45 |

at Hanson Field • Macomb, IL

- Date: November 23, 2024
- Game time: 1:00 p.m.
- Game weather: Cloudy, 32 °F (0 °C)
- Game attendance: 2,021
- Referee: Brenden McCain
- TV announcers (ESPN+): TBD

Game information

First quarter

- (8:52) GWEB – Taylor Shields 20 yard pass from Tyler Ridell, Jay Billingsley kick (Drive: 10 plays, 71 yards, 3:46; GWEB 7–0)
- (3:34) WIU – Matthew Henry 17 yard pass from Nathan Lamb, Antonio Chadha kick (Drive: 5 plays, 34 yards, 1:37; TIED 7–7)

Second quarter

- (12:00) WIU – Torrance Farmer Jr. 2 yard run, Antonio Chadha kick (Drive: 9 plays, 54 yards, 2:55; WIU 14–7)
- (0:04) GWEB – Quasean Holmes 1 yard pass from Tyler Ridell, Jay Billingsley kick (Drive: 8 plays, 51 yards, 1:50; TIED 14–14)

Third quarter

- (11:42) WIU – Matthew Henry 46 yard pass from Christian Anaya, Antonio Chadha kick (Drive: 2 plays, 82 yards, 0:46; WIU 21–14)
- (8:14) GWEB – Quasean Holmes 24 yard pass from Tyler Ridell, Jay Billingsley kick (Drive: 1 play, 24 yards, 0:07; TIED 21–21)
- (5:29) WIU – Nathan Lamb 1 yard run, Antonio Chadha kick (Drive: 6 plays, 72 yards, 2:36; WIU 28–21)
- (5:19) GWEB – Carson Gresock 1 yard run, Jay Billingsley kick (Drive: 12 plays, 47 yards, 5:19; TIED 28–28)

Fourth quarter

- (10:45) WIU – Elijah Aragon 23 yard pass from Nathan Lamb, Antonio Chadha kick (Drive: 8 plays, 65 yards, 4:09; WIU 35–28)
- (8:54) WIU – Torrance Farmer Jr. 1 yard run, Antonio Chadha kick (Drive: 3 plays, 11 yards, 1:03; WIU 42–28)
- (3:14) WIU – Antonio Chadha 28 yard field goal (Drive: 8 plays, 54 yards, 3:29; WIU 45–28)

| Statistics | GWEB | WIU |
|---|---|---|
| First downs | 25 | 21 |
| Total yards | 348 | 511 |
| Rushing yards | 55 | 81 |
| Passing yards | 293 | 430 |
| Passing: Comp–Att–Int | 28–47–0 | 24–34–1 |
| Time of possession | 30:56 | 29:04 |

| Team | Category | Player | Statistics |
|---|---|---|---|
| Gardner–Webb | Passing | Tyler Ridell | 23/35, 234 yards, 3 TD |
| Gardner–Webb | Rushing | Quasean Holmes | 9 carries, 24 yards |
| Gardner–Webb | Receiving | Anthony Lowe | 5 receptions, 84 yards |
| Western Illinois | Passing | Nathan Lamb | 23/33, 352 yards, 2 TD, 1 INT |
| Western Illinois | Rushing | Torrance Farmer Jr. | 16 carries, 58 yards, 2 TD |
| Western Illinois | Receiving | Matthew Henry | 6 receptions, 210 yards, 2 TD |
