= 2024 Illinois State Redbirds football team =

American college football season

2024 Illinois State Redbirds football

NCAA Division I Second Round, L 10–42 at UC Davis
- Conference: Missouri Valley Football Conference

Ranking
- STATS: No. 11
- FCS Coaches: No. 10
- Record: 10–4 (6–2 MVFC)
- Head coach: Brock Spack (16th season)
- Offensive coordinator: Tony Petersen (3rd season)
- Defensive coordinator: Travis Niekamp (7th season)
- Home stadium: Hancock Stadium

2024 Missouri Valley Football Conference standings
	Conf.			Overall
Team	W		L	W		L
No. 1 North Dakota State +^	7	–	1	14	–	2
No. 3 South Dakota State +^	7	–	1	12	–	3
No. 4 South Dakota +^	7	–	1	11	–	3
Missouri State *	6	–	2	8	–	4
No. 11 Illinois State ^	6	–	2	10	–	4
Youngstown State	3	–	5	4	–	8
Indiana State	3	–	5	4	–	8
North Dakota	2	–	6	5	–	7
Southern Illinois	2	–	6	4	–	8
Northern Iowa	1	–	7	3	–	9
Murray State	0	–	8	1	–	11
+ – Conference co-champions; ^ – FCS playoff participant; * – Ineligible for 2024 FCS playoffs due to transition to the FBS; Rankings from STATS Poll

The 2024 Illinois State Redbirds football team represented Illinois State University as a member of the Missouri Valley Football Conference (MVFC) during the 2024 NCAA Division I FCS football season. They were led by 16th-year head coach Brock Spack. Illinois State played their home games at Hancock Stadium in Normal, Illinois.

== Preseason ==
=== MVFC poll ===
The MVFC released it preseason prediction poll on July 22, 2024. The Redbirds were predicted to finish sixth in the conference.

== Schedule ==
Date	Time	Opponent	Rank	Site	TV	Result	Attendance
August 31	11:00 a.m.	at No. 25 (FBS) Iowa*	No. 19	Kinnick Stadium; Iowa City, IA	BTN	L 0–40	69,250
September 7	6:00 p.m.	at North Alabama*	No. 21	Braly Municipal Stadium; Florence, AL	ESPN+	W 24–17	8,014
September 14	12:00 p.m.	Western Illinois*	No. 18	Hancock Stadium; Normal, IL	Marquee/ ESPN+	W 51–34	12,440
September 21	6:00 p.m.	Eastern Illinois*	No. 17	Hancock Stadium; Normal, IL	Marquee/ ESPN+	W 31–7	9,012
September 28	2:00 p.m.	No. 2 North Dakota State^{†}	No. 18	Hancock Stadium; Normal, IL	ESPN+	L 10–42	11,687
October 5	6:00 p.m.	at No. 19 Southern Illinois	No. 18	Saluki Stadium; Carbondale, IL	ESPN+	W 45–10	7,157
October 12	12:00 p.m.	Missouri State	No. 16	Hancock Stadium; Normal, IL	ESPN+	L 7–41	6,232
October 19	2:00 p.m.	at Murray State	No. 21	Roy Stewart Stadium; Murray, KY	ESPN+	W 40–32	15,991
November 2	2:00 p.m.	Youngstown State	No. 21	Hancock Stadium; Normal, IL	Marquee/ ESPN+	W 23–16	6,381
November 9	1:00 p.m.	at Northern Iowa	No. 18	UNI-Dome; Cedar Falls, IA	ESPN+	W 31–9	1,880
November 16	12:00 p.m.	at Indiana State	No. 17	Memorial Stadium; Terre Haute, IN	ESPN+	W 31–19	3,188
November 23	12:00 p.m.	North Dakota	No. 14	Hancock Stadium; Normal, IL	ESPN+	W 35–13	5,631
November 30	11:00 a.m.	at No. 16 Southeast Missouri State*	No. 11	Houck Stadium; Cape Girardeau, MO (NCAA Division I First Round)	ESPN+	W 35–27	
December 7	3:00 p.m.	at No. 5 UC Davis*	No. 11	UC Davis Health Stadium; Davis, CA (NCAA Division I Second Round)	ESPN+	L 10–42	6,317
*Non-conference game; ^{†}Homecoming; Rankings from STATS Poll released prior to the game; All times are in Central time

== Game summaries ==
=== at No. 25 (FBS) Iowa ===
Game One – No. 19 Illinois State Redbirds (0-0) at No. 25 (FBS) Iowa Hawkeyes (0-0) – Game summary

Quarter	1	2	3	4	Total
No. 19 Redbirds	0	0	0	0	0
No. 25 (FBS) Hawkeyes	3	3	13	21	40

at Kinnick Stadium • Iowa City, IA

- Date: Saturday August 31, 2024
- Game time: 11:00 AM CST
- Game weather: Sunny; 76 °F (24 °C); Wind: NW 4 mph (6.4 km/h)
- Game attendance: 69,250
- Referee: Mark Kluczynski
- TV announcers (BTN): Mark Followill (play-by-play), Anthony Herron (analyst), and Melanie Ricks (sideline)

Game information

First quarter

- 5:35 Iowa – Drew Stevens 41-yard field goal (Drive: 4 plays, 6 yards, 1:31; Iowa 3–0)

Second quarter

- 1:00 Iowa – Drew Stevens 28-yard field goal (Drive: 10 plays, 49 yards, 2:48; Iowa 6–0)

Third quarter

- 11:32 Iowa – Reece Vander Zee 7-yard pass from Cade McNamara (Two-Point Pass Conversion Failed) (Drive: 7 plays, 75 yards, 3:28; Iowa 12–0)
- 7:46 Iowa – Jacob Gill 31-yard pass from Cade McNamara (Drew Stevens kick) (Drive: 5 plays, 66 yards, 2:27; Iowa 19–0)

Fourth quarter

- 14:54 Iowa – Reece Vander Zee 19-yard pass from Cade McNamara (Drew Stevens kick) (Drive: 4 plays, 62 yards, 1:39; Iowa 26–0)
- 11:09 Iowa – Kaleb Johnson 64-yard run (Drew Stevens kick) (Drive: 4 plays, 77 yards, 2:04; Iowa 33–0)
- 5:48 Iowa – Kaleb Johnson 18-yard run (Drew Stevens kick) (Drive: 5 plays, 34 yards, 3:11; Iowa 40–0)

Statistics	ILST	IOWA
First downs	12	23
Total yards	189	492
Rushing yards	56	241
Passing yards	133	251
Passing: Comp–Att–Int	14–29–1	21–31–0
Time of possession	25:12	34:48

Team	Category	Player	Statistics
Illinois State	Passing	Tommy Rittenhouse	10/20, 119 yards, INT
Illinois State	Rushing	Wenkers Wright	9 carries, 36 yards
Illinois State	Receiving	Xavier Loyd	4 receptions, 53 yards
Iowa	Passing	Cade McNamara	21/31, 251 yards, 3 TD
Iowa	Rushing	Kaleb Johnson	11 carries, 119 yards, 2 TD
Iowa	Receiving	Reece Vander Zee	5 receptions, 66 yards, 2 TD

=== at North Alabama ===
Game Two – No. 21 Illinois State Redbirds (0–1) vs North Alabama Lions (0–2) – Game summary

Quarter	1	2	3	4	Total
No. 21 Redbirds	7	7	10	0	24
Lions	3	0	7	7	17

at Braly Stadium • Florence, AL

- Date: Saturday September 7, 2024
- Game time: 6:00 PM CST
- Game weather: SE at 9 miles per hour (14 km/h) • Weather: Sunny • Temp: 81 °F (27 °C)
- Game attendance: 8,014
- Referee: Jeremee Tate
- TV announcers (ESPN+): Benjamin Ray (play-by-play) and Bryan Neece (analyst)

Game information

First quarter

- (11:17) ILST – Mitch Bartol 18-yard pass from Tommy Rittenhouse (Ian Wagner kick) (Drive: 7 plays, 75 yards, 3:39; ILST 7-0)
- (7:27) UNA – Scott Payne 25-yard field goal (Drive: 9 plays, 67 yards, 3:50; ILST 7-3)

Second quarter

- (11:42) ILST – Tommy Rittenhouse 3-yard rush (Ian Wagner kick) (Drive: 9 plays, 65 yards, 3:18; ILST 14-3)

Third quarter

- (6:17) UNA – Kobe Warden 15-yard pass from Ari Patu (Scott Payne kick) (Drive: 8 plays, 80 yards, 4:38; ILST 14-10)
- (6:00) ILST – Tommy Rittenhouse 71-yard rush (Ian Wagner kick) (Drive: 1 play, 71 yards, 0:10; ILST 21-10)
- (7:27) ILST – Ian Wagner 21-yard field goal (Drive: 13 plays, 83 yards, 4:48; ILST 24-10)

Fourth quarter

- (10:57) UNA – Ari Patu 7-yard rush (Scott Payne kick) (Drive: 4 play, 72 yards, 1:25; ILST 21-17)

Statistics	ILST	UNA
First downs	20	17
Total yards	478	411
Rushing yards	325	83
Passing yards	153	328
Passing: Comp–Att–Int	16-26-1	21-36-1
Time of possession	30:31	29:29

Team	Category	Player	Statistics
Illinois State	Passing	Tommy Rittenhouse	13/21, 142 yards, TD, INT
Illinois State	Rushing	Wenkers Wright	26 carries, 153 yards
Illinois State	Receiving	Dylan Ford	6 receptions, 52 yards
North Alabama	Passing	Ari Patu	21/36, 328 yards, TD, INT
North Alabama	Rushing	Jayvian Allen	14 carries, 63 yards
North Alabama	Receiving	Takairee Kenebrew	7 receptions, 129 yards

=== Western Illinois ===
Game Three – Western Illinois Leathernecks (0–2) vs No. 18 Illinois State Redbirds (1–1) – Game summary

Quarter	1	2	3	4	Total
Leathernecks	7	14	7	6	34
No. 18 Redbirds	14	10	14	13	51

at Hancock Stadium • Normal, IL

- Date: September 14, 2024
- Game time: 12:05 p.m.
- Game weather: 82 °F (28 °C)
- Game attendance: 12,440
- Referee: Jason Perkins
- TV: Marquee/ESPN+

Game information

First quarter

- (13:50) ILST – Xavier Loyd 59-yard pass from Tommy Rittenhouse (Ian Wagner kick) (Drive: 4 plays, 75 yards, 1:10; ILST 7-0)
- (8:30) ILST – Tommy Rittenhouse 6-yard rush (Ian Wagner kick) (Drive: 6 plays, 46 yards, 2:10; ILST 14-0)
- (4:26) WIU – Nathan Lamb 6-yard rush (Antonio Chadha kick) (Drive: 9 plays, 75 yards, 4:04; ILST 14-7)

Second quarter

- (12:35) WIU – Christian Anaya 3-yard pass from Nathan Lamb (Antonio Chadha kick) (Drive: 11 plays, 95 yards, 5:36; Tie 14-14)
- (10:36) ILST – Jake Rubley 1-yard rush (Ian Wagner kick) (Drive: 6 plays, 34 yards, 1:58; ILST 21-14)
- (5:25) WIU – Nathan Lamb 6-yard rush (Antonio Chadha kick) (Drive: 11 plays, 76 yards, 5:05; Tie 21-21)
- (2:42) ILST – Ian Wagner 21-yard field goal (Drive: 9 plays, 65 yards, 2:43; ILST 24-21)

Third quarter

- (11:55) ILST – Lavoise-Deontae McCoy 58-yard blocked field goal return (Ian Wagner kick) (ILST 31-21)
- (7:36) WIU – Nathan Lamb 2-yard rush (Antonio Chadha kick) (Drive: 10 plays, 60 yards, 4:19; ILST 31-28)
- (3:52) ILST – Wenkers Wright 3-yard rush (Ian Wagner kick) (Drive: 11 plays, 88 yards, 3:40; ILST 38-28)

Fourth quarter

- (12:28) ILST – Daniel Sobkowicz 23-yard rush (Drive: 9 play, 54 yards, 3:06; ILST 44-28)
- (3:27) ILST – Matt Lawson 4-yard rush (Ian Wagner kick) (Drive: 2 plays, 9 yards, 0:43; ILST 51-28)
- (0:02) ILST – Eli Aragon 3-yard pass from Chris Irvin (Drive: 13 plays, 65 yards, 3:25; ILST 51-34)

Statistics	WIU	ILST
First downs	31	21
Total yards	503	390
Rushing yards	186	189
Passing yards	317	201
Passing: Comp–Att–Int	31-43-1	16-25-0
Time of possession	38:33	21:27

Team	Category	Player	Statistics
Western Illinois	Passing	Nathan Lamb	24-34, 269 Yards, 1 TD, 1 INT
Western Illinois	Rushing	Cameron Smith	20 Att, 78 Yards, 0 TD
Western Illinois	Rushing	Nathan Lamb	15 Att, 74 Yards, 3 TD
Western Illinois	Receiving	Matthew Henry	7 Rec, 124 Yards
Illinois State	Passing	Tommy Rittenhouse	16-22, 201 Yards, 2 TD, 0 INT
Illinois State	Rushing	Wenkers Wright	16 Att, 106 Yards, 1 TD
Illinois State	Receiving	Xavier Loyd	4 Rec, 85 Yards, 1 TD

=== Eastern Illinois (Mid-America Classic) ===
Game Four – Eastern Illinois Panthers (1–2) vs No. 17 Illinois State Redbirds (2–1) – Game summary

Quarter	1	2	3	4	Total
Panthers	0	7	0	0	7
No. 17 Redbirds	14	7	3	7	31

at Hancock Stadium • Normal, IL

- Date: September 21, 2024
- Game time: 6:00 p.m.
- Game weather: Cloudy, 83 °F (28 °C)
- Game attendance: 9,012
- Referee: Greg Gompf
- TV announcers (Marquee/ESPN+): Kurt Pegler (play-by-play) and Clay Harbor (analyst)

Game information

First quarter

- (2:34) ILST – Daniel Sobkowicz 31-yard pass from Tommy Rittenhouse, Ian Wagner kick (Drive: 12 plays, 98 yards, 5:53; Illinois State 7–0)
- (0:39) ILST – Xavier Loyd 12-yard pass from Tommy Rittenhouse, Ian Wagner kick (Drive: 4 plays, 26 yards, 1:12; Illinois State 14–0)

Second quarter

- (9:07) ILST – Daniel Sobkowicz 5-yard pass from Tommy Rittenhouse, Ian Wagner kick (Drive: 11 plays, 81 yards, 4:24; Illinois State 21–0)
- (1:56) EIU – MJ Flowers 4-yard run, Drew Schiller kick (Drive: 6 plays, 49 yards, 2:12; Illinois State 21–7)

Third quarter

- (12:32) ILST – Ian Wagner 28-yard field goal (Drive: 6 plays, 64 yards, 2:28; Illinois State 24–7)

Fourth quarter

- (12:28) ILST – Wenkers Wright 1-yard run, Ian Wagner kick (Drive: 8 plays, 53 yards, 3:08; Illinois State 31–7)

Statistics	EIU	ILST
First downs	9	28
Total yards	192	518
Rushing yards	105	253
Passing yards	87	265
Passing: Comp–Att–Int	12–22–2	22–28–1
Time of possession	24:03	35:57

Team	Category	Player	Statistics
Eastern Illinois	Passing	Pierce Holley	10/19, 72 yards, 2 INT
Eastern Illinois	Rushing	MJ Flowers	19 carries, 117 yards, 1 TD
Eastern Illinois	Receiving	Eli Mirza	2 receptions, 19 yards
Illinois State	Passing	Tommy Rittenhouse	17/22, 228 yards, 3 TD
Illinois State	Rushing	Wenkers Wright	25 carries, 150 yards, 1 TD
Illinois State	Receiving	Daniel Sobkowicz	7 receptions, 93 yards, 2 TD

=== No. 2 North Dakota State ===
Game Five – No. 2 North Dakota State Bison (3–1) vs No. 18 Illinois State Redbirds (3–1) – Game summary

Quarter	1	2	3	4	Total
No. 2 Bison	7	7	21	7	42
No. 18 Redbirds	0	7	0	3	10

at Hancock Stadium • Normal, IL

- Date: September 28, 2024
- Game time: 2:00 p.m.
- Game weather: Sunny, 73 °F (23 °C)
- Game attendance: 11,687
- Referee: Aaron Adams
- TV: ESPN+

Game information

First quarter

- (6:45) NDSU – Bryce Lance 7-yard pass from Cam Miller, Griffin Crosa kick (Drive: 11 plays, 64 yards, 6:47; North Dakota State 7-0)

Second quarter

- (4:45) NDSU – Mekhi Collins 11-yard pass from Cam Miller, Griffin Crosa kick (Drive: 16 plays, 80 yards, 10:09; North Dakota State 14-0)
- (2:56) ILST – Wenkers Wright 2-yard run, Ian Wagner kick (Drive: 5 plays, 74 yards, 1:43; North Dakota State 14-7)

Third quarter

- (10:55) NDSU – Barika Kpeenu 40-yard pass from Cam Miller, Griffin Crosa kick (Drive: 7 plays, 69 yards, 4:01; North Dakota State 21-7)
- (6:07) NDSU – CharMar Brown 14-yard run, Griffin Crosa kick (Drive: 6 plays, 51 yards, 3:05; North Dakota State 28-7)
- (1:51) NDSU – Barika Kpeenu 9-yard run, Griffin Crosa kick (Drive: 4 plays, 48 yards, 2:25; North Dakota State 35-7)

Fourth quarter

- (11:27) NDSU – Cole Payton 73-yard run, Griffin Crosa kick (Drive: 4 plays, 97 yards, 2:18; North Dakota State 42-7)
- (5:44) ILST – Ian Wagner 38-yard field goal (Drive: 13 plays, 54 yards, 5:43; North Dakota State 42-10)

Statistics	NDSU	ILST
First downs	29	12
Total yards	544	206
Rushing yards	307	8
Passing yards	237	198
Passing: Comp–Att–Int	21–24–0	17–24–0
Time of possession	38:57	21:03

Team	Category	Player	Statistics
North Dakota State	Passing	Cam Miller	20/23, 216 yards, 3 TD
North Dakota State	Rushing	CharMar Brown	17 carries, 100 yards, TD
North Dakota State	Receiving	Bryce Lance	8 receptions, 65 yards, TD
Illinois State	Passing	Tommy Rittenhouse	10/14, 132 yards
Illinois State	Rushing	Wenkers Wright	9 carries, 24 yards, TD
Illinois State	Receiving	Xavier Lloyd	3 receptions, 52 yards

=== at No. 19 Southern Illinois ===
Game Six – No. 18 Illinois State Redbirds (3–2) vs No. 19 Southern Illinois Salukis (2–3) – Game summary

Quarter	1	2	3	4	Total
No. 18 Redbirds	0	0	0	0	0
No. 19 Salukis	0	0	0	0	0

at Saluki Stadium • Carbondale, IL

- Date: October 5, 2024
- Game time: 6:00 p.m. CST
- Game weather: 0 °F (−18 °C)
- TV: ESPN+

Game information

First quarter
Second quarter
Third quarter
Fourth quarter

Statistics	ILST	SIU
First downs		
Total yards		
Rushing yards		
Passing yards		
Passing: Comp–Att–Int		
Time of possession		

Team	Category	Player	Statistics
Illinois State	Passing		
Illinois State	Rushing		
Illinois State	Receiving		
Southern Illinois	Passing		
Southern Illinois	Rushing		
Southern Illinois	Receiving		

=== Missouri State ===
Game Seven – Missouri State Bears (3–2) vs No. 16 Illinois State Redbirds (4–2) – Game summary

Quarter	1	2	3	4	Total
Bears	0	0	0	0	0
No. 18 Redbirds	0	0	0	0	0

at Hancock Stadium • Normal, IL

- Date: October 12, 2024
- Game time: 12:00 p.m.
- Game weather: 0 °F (−18 °C)
- TV: ESPN+

Game information

First quarter
Second quarter
Third quarter
Fourth quarter

Statistics	MOST	ILST
First downs		
Total yards		
Rushing yards		
Passing yards		
Passing: Comp–Att–Int		
Time of possession		

Team	Category	Player	Statistics
Missouri State	Passing		
Missouri State	Rushing		
Missouri State	Receiving		
Illinois State	Passing		
Illinois State	Rushing		
Illinois State	Receiving		

=== at Murray State ===
Game Eight – No. 21 Illinois State Redbirds (4–3) vs Murray State Racers (1–5) – Game summary

Quarter	1	2	3	4	Total
No. 21 Redbirds	0	0	0	0	0
Racers	0	0	0	0	0

at Roy Stewart Stadium • Murray, KY

- Date: Saturday October 19, 2024
- Game time: 2:00 p.m.
- Game weather: 0 °F (−18 °C)
- TV: ESPN+

Game information

First quarter
Second quarter
Third quarter
Fourth quarter

Statistics	ILST	MURR
First downs		
Total yards		
Rushing yards		
Passing yards		
Passing: Comp–Att–Int		
Time of possession		

Team	Category	Player	Statistics
Illinois State	Passing		
Illinois State	Rushing		
Illinois State	Receiving		
Murray State	Passing		
Murray State	Rushing		
Murray State	Receiving		

=== Youngstown State ===
Game Nine – Youngstown State Penguins (3–6) vs No. 21 Illinois State Redbirds (5–3) – Game summary

Quarter	1	2	3	4	Total
Penguins	2	0	7	7	16
No. 21 Redbirds	3	6	14	0	23

at Hancock Stadium • Normal, IL

- Date: Saturday November 2, 2024
- Game time: 2:00 p.m.
- Game weather: Sunny • Temperature: 60 °F (16 °C)
- Game attendance: 6,381
- Referee: John Shay
- TV announcers (Marquee/ESPN+): Kurt Pegler (play-by-play), Clay Harbor (analyst) and Joey Lindstrom (sideline)

Game information

First quarter

- (11:21) YSU – Jaylen Castleberry safety (YSU 2–0)
- (2:03) ILST – Ian Wagner 33-yard field goal (Drive: 6 plays, 26 yards, 1:48; ILST 3–2)

Second quarter

- (11:44) ILST – Wenkers Wright 3-yard pass from Tommy Rittenhouse, Ian Wagner kick failed (Drive: 8 plays, 71 yards, 3:38; ILST 9–2)

Third quarter

- (13:05) ILST – Tommy Rittenhouse 11-yard run, Ian Wagner kick (Drive: 5 plays, 75 yards, 1:55; ILST 16–2
- (3:38) ILST – Javon Charles 4-yard pass from Tommy Rittenhouse, Ian Wagner kick (Drive: 8 plays, 75 yards, 3:49; ILST 23–9)

Fourth quarter

- (4:34) YSU – Max Tomczak 7-yard pass from Beau Brungard, Andrew Lastovka kick (Drive: 10 plays, 67 yards, 3:10; ILST 23–16)

Statistics	YSU	ILST
First downs	20	17
Total yards	299	346
Rushing yards	142	193
Passing yards	157	153
Passing: Comp–Att–Int	19–32–1	15–19–1
Time of possession	36:55	23:05

Team	Category	Player	Statistics
Youngstown State	Passing	Beau Brungard	19/32, 157 yards, TD, INT
Youngstown State	Rushing	Tyshon King	12 carries, 59 yards, TD
Youngstown State	Receiving	Max Tomczak	8 receptions, 73 yards, TD
Illinois State	Passing	Tommy Rittenhouse	15/19, 153 yards, 2 TD, INT
Illinois State	Rushing	Wenkers Wright	10 carries, 104 yards
Illinois State	Receiving	Daniel Sobkowicz	4 receptions, 81 yards

=== at Northern Iowa ===
Game Ten – No. 18 Illinois State Redbirds (6–3) vs Northern Iowa Panthers (2–7) – Game summary

Quarter	1	2	3	4	Total
No. 18 Redbirds	0	0	0	0	0
Panthers	0	0	0	0	0

at UNI-Dome • Cedar Falls, IA

- Date: Saturday November 9, 2024
- Game time: 1:00 p.m.
- Game weather: 0 °F (−18 °C)
- TV: ESPN+

Game information

First quarter
Second quarter
Third quarter
Fourth quarter

Statistics	ILST	UNI
First downs		
Total yards		
Rushing yards		
Passing yards		
Passing: Comp–Att–Int		
Time of possession		

Team	Category	Player	Statistics
Illinois State	Passing		
Illinois State	Rushing		
Illinois State	Receiving		
Northern Iowa	Passing		
Northern Iowa	Rushing		
Northern Iowa	Receiving		

=== at Indiana State ===
Game Eleven – No. 17 Illinois State Redbirds (7–3) vs Indiana State Sycamores (4–6) – Game summary

Quarter	1	2	3	4	Total
No. 17 Redbirds	0	0	0	0	0
Sycamores	0	0	0	0	0

at Memorial Stadium • Terre Haute, IN

- Date: Saturday November 16, 2024
- Game time: 12:00 p.m.
- Game weather: 0 °F (−18 °C)
- TV: ESPN+

Game information

First quarter
Second quarter
Third quarter
Fourth quarter

Statistics	ILST	INST
First downs		
Total yards		
Rushing yards		
Passing yards		
Passing: Comp–Att–Int		
Time of possession		

Team	Category	Player	Statistics
Illinois State	Passing		
Illinois State	Rushing		
Illinois State	Receiving		
Indiana State	Passing		
Indiana State	Rushing		
Indiana State	Receiving		

=== North Dakota ===
Game Twelve – North Dakota Fighting Hawks (5–6) vs No. 14 Illinois State Redbirds (8–3) – Game summary

Quarter	1	2	3	4	Total
Fighting Hawks	0	0	0	0	0
No. 14 Redbirds	0	0	0	0	0

at Hancock Stadium • Normal, IL

- Date: Saturday November 23, 2024
- Game time: 12:00 p.m.
- Game weather: 0 °F (−18 °C)
- TV: ESPN+

Game information

First quarter
Second quarter
Third quarter
Fourth quarter

Statistics	UND	ILST
First downs		
Total yards		
Rushing yards		
Passing yards		
Passing: Comp–Att–Int		
Time of possession		

Team	Category	Player	Statistics
North Dakota	Passing		
North Dakota	Rushing		
North Dakota	Receiving		
Illinois State	Passing		
Illinois State	Rushing		
Illinois State	Receiving		

=== No. 16 Southeast Missouri State (NCAA Division I Playoff–First Round) ===
NCAA Division I Playoff–First Round – No. 16 Southeast Missouri State Redhawks (9–3) at No. 11 Illinois State Redbirds (9–3) – Game summary

Quarter	1	2	3	4	Total
No. 11 Redbirds	7	21	7	0	35
No. 16 Redhawks	7	0	7	13	27

at Houck Stadium • Cape Girardeau, MO

- Date: Saturday November 30, 2024
- Game time: 12:00 p.m.
- Game weather: Cloudy, 32 °F (0 °C)
- Game attendance: 0
- Referee: Preston Clipper
- TV announcers (ESPN+): Shawn Kenney (play-by-play) and Jay Sonnhalter (analyst)

Game information

First quarter

- (5:20) SEMO – Dorian Anderson 4 yard pass from Paxton DeLaurent, DC Pippin kick (Drive: 10 plays, 73 yards, 4:43; SEMO 7–0)
- (1:31) ILST – Wenkers Wright 2 yard run, Ian Wagner kick (Drive: 10 plays, 58 yards, 3:43; TIED 7–7)

Second quarter

- (5:50) ILST – Daniel Sobkowicz 62 yard pass from Tommy Rittenhouse (Drive: 2 plays, 62 yards, 0:38; ILST 13–7)
- (2:06) ILST – Jake Anderson 55 yard interception return, Daniel Sobkowicz pass to Mitch Bartol for two-point conversion (ILST 21–7)
- (0:43) ILST – Xavier Loyd 24 yard pass from Tommy Rittenhouse, Ian Wagner kick (Drive: 3 plays, 40 yards, 0:45; ILST 28–7)

Third quarter

- (11:40) SEMO – Donnie Cheers 10 yard pass from Paxton DeLaurent, DC Pippin kick (Drive: 10 plays, 88 yards, 3:12; ILST 28–14)
- (9:45) ILST – Keondre Jackson 30 yard interception return, Ian Wagner kick (ILST 35–14)

Fourth quarter

- (6:44) SEMO – Tristan Smith 9 yard pass from Paxton DeLaurent, DC Pippin kick (Drive: 11 plays, 75 yards, 2:40; ILST 35–21)
- (1:31) SEMO – Dorian Anderson 34 yard pass from Paxton DeLaurent (Drive: 4 plays, 66 yards, 0:39; ILST 35–27)

Statistics	ILST	SEMO
First downs	14	34
Total yards	322	602
Rushing yards	45	35
Passing yards	277	567
Passing: Comp–Att–Int	24–36–0	48–85–5
Time of possession	25:33	34:27

Team	Category	Player	Statistics
Illinois State	Passing	Tommy Rittenhouse	24/36, 277 yards, 2 TD
Illinois State	Rushing	Wenkers Wright	12 carries, 17 yards, 1 TD
Illinois State	Receiving	Daniel Sobkowicz	7 receptions, 136 yards, 1 TD
Southeast Missouri State	Passing	Paxton DeLaurent	48/85, 567 yards, 4 TD, 5 INT
Southeast Missouri State	Rushing	Brandon Epton Jr.	6 carries, 32 yards
Southeast Missouri State	Receiving	Cam Pedro	11 receptions, 149 yards

=== at No. 5 UC Davis (NCAA Division I Playoff–Second Round) ===
NCAA Division I Playoff–First Round – No. 11 Illinois State Redbirds (10-3) vs No. 5 UC Davis Aggies (10–2) – Game summary

Quarter	1	2	3	4	Total
No. 11 Redbirds	0	0	0	0	0
No. 5 Aggies	0	0	0	0	0

at UC Davis Health Stadium • Davis, CA

- Date: Saturday December 7, 2024
- Game time: 3:00 p.m.
- Game weather: 60 °F (16 °C)
- TV announcers (ESPN+): TBD

Game information

First quarter
Second quarter
Third quarter
Fourth quarter

Statistics	ILLST	UCD
First downs		
Total yards		
Rushing yards		
Passing yards		
Passing: Comp–Att–Int		
Time of possession		

Team	Category	Player	Statistics
Illinois State	Passing		
Illinois State	Rushing		
Illinois State	Receiving		
UC Davis	Passing		
UC Davis	Rushing		
UC Davis	Receiving		
