= 2024 Eastern Illinois Panthers football team =

American college football season

2024 Eastern Illinois Panthers football
- Conference: Big South–OVC
- Record: 3–9 (2–6 Big South–OVC)
- Head coach: Chris Wilkerson (3rd season)
- Offensive coordinator: Kyle Derickson (1st season)
- Defensive coordinator: Collin Geier (1st season)
- Home stadium: O'Brien Field

2024 Big South–OVC football standings
	Conf.			Overall
Team	W		L	W		L
No. 16 Southeast Missouri State +^	6	–	2	9	–	4
Tennessee Tech +	6	–	2	7	–	5
No. 17 UT Martin +^	6	–	2	9	–	5
No. 19 Tennessee State +^	6	–	2	9	–	4
Lindenwood*	4	–	4	5	–	7
Western Illinois	3	–	5	4	–	8
Gardner–Webb	3	–	5	4	–	8
Eastern Illinois	2	–	6	3	–	9
Charleston Southern	0	–	8	1	–	11
+ – Conference co-champions; ^ – FCS playoff participant; Note: Lindenwood ineligible for Big South–OVC title and FCS postseason play due to transition from NCAA Division II.; Rankings from STATS Poll

The 2024 Eastern Illinois Panthers football team represented Eastern Illinois University as a member of the Big South–OVC Football Association during the 2024 NCAA Division I FCS football season. The Panthers were led by third-year head coach Chris Wilkerson and played their home games at O'Brien Field located in Charleston, Illinois. They finished the season 3–9, 2–6 in Big South–OVC play to finish in eighth place.

== Preseason ==
=== Preseason poll ===
The Big South-OVC Conference released their preseason poll on July 17, 2024. The Panthers were picked to finish second in the conference.

== Schedule ==
Date	Time	Opponent	Site	TV	Result	Attendance
August 29	8:00 p.m.	at Illinois*	Memorial Stadium; Champaign, IL	BTN	L 0–45	43,849
September 7	6:00 p.m.	Indiana State*	O'Brien Field; Charleston, IL	ESPN+	W 27–20	7,222
September 14	6:30 p.m.	at Northwestern*	Martin Stadium; Evanston, IL	BTN	L 7–31	10,631
September 21	6:00 p.m.	at No. 17 Illinois State*	Hancock Stadium; Normal, IL (Mid-America Classic)	ESPN+	L 7–31	9,012
September 28	2:00 p.m.	Lindenwood	O'Brien Field; Charleston, IL	ESPN+	L 25–28	3,890
October 5	2:00 p.m.	No. 13 Southeast Missouri State	O'Brien Field; Charleston, IL	ESPN+	L 27–38	7,777
October 12	5:00 p.m.	at Tennessee State	Hale Stadium; Nashville, TN	ESPN+	L 17–41	7,875
October 26	2:00 p.m.	at UT Martin	Graham Stadium; Martin, TN	ESPN+	L 17–52	4,109
November 2	2:00 p.m.	Western Illinois	O'Brien Field; Charleston, IL	ESPN+	W 45–38	5,369
November 9	12:30 p.m.	at Gardner–Webb	Ernest W. Spangler Stadium; Boiling Springs, NC	ESPN+	L 28–31	2,451
November 16	12:00 p.m.	Charleston Southern	O'Brien Field; Charleston, IL	ESPN+	W 16–13 ^{OT}	1,895
November 23	12:00 p.m.	at Tennessee Tech	Tucker Stadium; Cookeville, TN	ESPN+	L 6–23	6,790
*Non-conference game; Rankings from STATS Poll released prior to the game; All times are in Central time

== Game summaries ==
=== at Illinois (FBS) ===
Game One – Eastern Illinois Panthers (0–0) at Illinois Fighting Illini (FBS) (0–0) – Game summary

Quarter	1	2	3	4	Total
Panthers	0	0	0	0	0
Fighting Illini (FBS)	14	17	7	7	45

at Memorial Stadium • Champaign, IL

- Date: Thursday August 29, 2024
- Game time: 9:00 p.m.
- Game weather: Sunny, 82 °F (28 °C)
- Game attendance: 43,849
- Referee: Ron Snodgrass
- TV announcers (BTN): Mark Followill (play-by-play), Jeremy Leman (analyst), and Kylen Mills (sideline)

Game information

First quarter

- (4:15) ILL – Pat Bryant 15-yard pass from Luke Altmyer (David Olano kick (Drive: 10 plays, 77 yards, 5:12; Illinois 7–0)
- (0:43) ILL – Tanner Arkin 5 yard pass from Luke Altmyer, David Olano kick (Drive: 4 plays, 25 yards, 1:49; Illinois 14–0)

Second quarter

- (10:10) ILL – David Olano 39 yard field goal (Drive: 10 plays, 53 yards, 4:45; Illinois 17–0)
- (4:43) ILL – Pat Bryant 28 yard pass from Luke Altmyer, David Olano kick (Drive: 2 plays, 29 yards, 0:38; Illinois 24–0)
- (1:30) ILL – Malik Elzy 34 yard pass from Luke Altmyer, David Olano kick (Drive: 4 plays, 67 yards, 0:59; Illinois 31–0)

Third quarter

- (7:04) ILL – Kaden Feagin run for 1 yd for a TD, David Olano kick (Drive: 9 plays, 86 yards, 4:40; Illinois 38–0)

Fourth quarter

- (13:51) ILL — Josh McCray run for 6 yds for a TD, David Olano kick (Drive: 9 plays, 87 yards, 4:27; Illinois 45–0)

Statistics	EIU	ILL
First downs	9	27
Total yards	196	488
Rushing yards	49	246
Passing yards	147	242
Passing: Comp–Att–Int	16-32-2	21–29–0
Time of possession	23:59	36:01

Team	Category	Player	Statistics
Eastern Illinois	Passing	Pierce Holley	16–32, 147 yards, 2 INT
Eastern Illinois	Rushing	MJ Flowers	9 carries, 28 yards
Eastern Illinois	Receiving	DiAirious Smith	5 receptions, 63 yards
Illinois	Passing	Luke Altmyer	19–24, 213 yards, 4 TD
Illinois	Rushing	Kaden Feagin	16 carries, 108 yards, 1 TD
Illinois	Receiving	Pat Bryant	5 receptions, 63 yards, 2 TD

=== Indiana State ===
Game Two – Indiana State Sycamores (0–1) at Eastern Illinois Panthers (0–1) – Game summary

Quarter	1	2	3	4	Total
Sycamores	0	13	0	7	20
Panthers	7	10	10	0	27

at O'Brien Field, Charleston, IL

- Date: Saturday September 7, 2024
- Game time: 6:00 PM
- Game weather: Sunny, 65 °F (18 °C)
- Game attendance: 7,222
- Referee: Gabriel Tomlin
- TV announcers (ESPN+): Mike Bradd (play-by-play) and Dave Kidwell (analyst)

Game information

First quarter
Second quarter
Third quarter
Fourth quarter

Statistics	INST	EIU
First downs	20	16
Total yards	334	354
Rushing yards	74	86
Passing yards	260	268
Passing: Comp–Att–Int	30–37–3	19–32–1
Time of possession	31:15	28:41

Team	Category	Player	Statistics
Indiana State	Passing	Elijah Owens	30/37, 260 yards, 3 TD, 3 INT
Indiana State	Rushing	Elijah Owens	12 carries, 44 yards
Indiana State	Receiving	Rashad Rochelle	4 receptions, 45 yards, 1 TD
Eastern Illinois	Passing	Pierce Holley	19/32, 268 yards, 1 TD, 1 INT
Eastern Illinois	Rushing	MJ Flowers	24 carries, 93 yards, 1 TD
Eastern Illinois	Receiving	Terrance Gipson	6 receptions, 100 yards

=== at Northwestern (FBS) ===
Game Three – Eastern Illinois Panthers (1–1) vs Northwestern Wildcats (FBS) (1–1) – Game summary

Quarter	1	2	3	4	Total
Panthers	0	7	0	0	7
Wildcats (FBS)	7	7	10	7	31

at Martin Stadium • Evanston, IL

- Date: September 14, 2024
- Game time: 6:30 p.m.
- Game weather: Sunny
- Game attendance: 10,631
- Referee: Gregory Blum
- TV announcers (BTN): Jason Ross Jr. (play-by-play) and Matt Millen (analyst)

Game information

First quarter

- (1:22) NU – Cam Porter 1 yard run, Jack Olsen kick (Drive: 11 plays, 80 yards, 4:57; NU 7–0)

Second quarter

- (10:37) EIU – Eli Mirza 13 yard pass from Pierce Holley, Drew Schiller kick (Drive: 13 plays, 75 yards, 5:45; TIE 7–7)
- (0:14) NU – Joseph Himon II 32 yard run, Jack Olsen kick (Drive: 8 plays, 80 yards, 1:33; NU 14–7)

Third quarter

- (8:18) NU – Jack Olsen 46 yard field goal (Drive: 9 plays, 64 yards, 5:38; NU 17–7)
- (2:39) NU – A.J. Henning 3 yard pass from Jack Lausch, Jack Olsen kick (Drive: 7 plays, 42 yards, 4:10; NU 24–7)

Fourth quarter

- (6:58) NU – Marshall Lang 9 yard pass from Jack Lausch, Jack Olsen kick (Drive: 6 plays, 79 yards, 4:08; NU 31–7)

Statistics	EIU	NW
First downs	13	22
Total yards	207	450
Rushing yards	40	203
Passing yards	167	247
Passing: Comp–Att–Int	17–31–1	21–32–0
Time of possession	24:28	35:32

Team	Category	Player	Statistics
Eastern Illinois	Passing	Pierce Holley	17/31, 167 yards, 1 TD, 1 INT
Eastern Illinois	Rushing	Jay Pearson	8 carries, 29 yards
Eastern Illinois	Receiving	Cooper Willman	6 receptions, 66 yards
Northwestern	Passing	Jack Lausch	20/31, 227 yards, 2 TD
Northwestern	Rushing	Cam Porter	15 carries, 77 yards, 1 TD
Northwestern	Receiving	A.J. Henning	7 receptions, 117 yards, 1 TD

=== at No. 17 Illinois State (Mid-America Classic) ===
Game Four – Eastern Illinois Panthers (1–2) vs No. 17 Illinois State Redbirds (2–1) – Game summary

Quarter	1	2	3	4	Total
Panthers	0	7	0	0	7
No. 17 Redbirds	14	7	3	7	31

at Hancock Stadium • Normal, IL

- Date: September 21, 2024
- Game time: 6:00 p.m.
- Game weather: Cloudy, 83 °F (28 °C)
- Game attendance: 9,012
- Referee: Greg Gompf
- TV announcers (ESPN+): Kurt Pegler (play-by-play) and Clay Harbor (analyst)

Game information

First quarter

- (2:34) ILST – Daniel Sobkowicz 31-yard pass from Tommy Rittenhouse, Ian Wagner kick (Drive: 12 plays, 98 yards, 5:53; Illinois State 7–0)
- (0:39) ILST – Xavier Loyd 12-yard pass from Tommy Rittenhouse, Ian Wagner kick (Drive: 4 plays, 26 yards, 1:12; Illinois State 14–0)

Second quarter

- (9:07) ILST – Daniel Sobkowicz 5-yard pass from Tommy Rittenhouse, Ian Wagner kick (Drive: 11 plays, 81 yards, 4:24; Illinois State 21–0)
- (1:56) EIU – MJ Flowers 4-yard run, Drew Schiller kick (Drive: 6 plays, 49 yards, 2:12; Illinois State 21–7)

Third quarter

- (12:32) ILST – Ian Wagner 28-yard field goal (Drive: 6 plays, 64 yards, 2:28; Illinois State 24–7)

Fourth quarter

- (12:28) ILST – Wenkers Wright 1-yard run, Ian Wagner kick (Drive: 8 plays, 53 yards, 3:08; Illinois State 31–7)

Statistics	EIU	ILST
First downs	9	28
Total yards	192	518
Rushing yards	105	253
Passing yards	87	265
Passing: Comp–Att–Int	12–22–2	22–28–1
Time of possession	24:03	35:57

Team	Category	Player	Statistics
Eastern Illinois	Passing	Pierce Holley	10/19, 72 yards, 2 INT
Eastern Illinois	Rushing	MJ Flowers	19 carries, 117 yards, 1 TD
Eastern Illinois	Receiving	Eli Mirza	2 receptions, 19 yards
Illinois State	Passing	Tommy Rittenhouse	17/22, 228 yards, 3 TD
Illinois State	Rushing	Wenkers Wright	25 carries, 150 yards, 1 TD
Illinois State	Receiving	Daniel Sobkowicz	7 receptions, 93 yards, 2 TD

=== Lindenwood ===
Game Five – Lindenwood Lions (1–3) at Eastern Illinois Panthers (1–3) – Game summary

Quarter	1	2	3	4	Total
Lions	0	0	14	14	28
Panthers	14	3	0	8	25

at O'Brien Field • Charleston, IL

- Date: Saturday September 28, 2024
- Game time: 2:00 PM
- Game weather: Cloudy, 73 °F (23 °C)
- Game attendance: 3,890
- Referee: Branden McCain
- TV announcers (ESPN+): Mike Bradd (play-by-play), Dave Kidwell (analyst) and Kacy Standohar (sideline)

Game information

First quarter
Second quarter
Third quarter
Fourth quarter

Statistics	LIN	EIU
First downs	20	25
Total yards	453	458
Rushing yards	170	132
Passing yards	283	326
Passing: Comp–Att–Int	14–19–1	26–44–0
Time of possession	29:22	30:38

Team	Category	Player	Statistics
Lindenwood	Passing	Nate Glantz	14/19, 283 yards, 4 TD, 1 INT
Lindenwood	Rushing	Cortezz Jones	20 carries, 104 yards
Lindenwood	Receiving	Jeff Caldwell	4 receptions, 115 yards, 4 TD
Eastern Illinois	Passing	Pierce Holley	26/43, 326 yards, 2 TD
Eastern Illinois	Rushing	MJ Flowers	28 carries, 123 yards
Eastern Illinois	Receiving	Terrance Gipson	9 receptions, 93 yards

=== No. 13 Southeast Missouri State ===
Game Six – No. 13 Southeast Missouri State Redhawks (4–1) at Eastern Illinois Panthers (1–4) – Game summary

Quarter	1	2	3	4	Total
No. 13 Redhawks	7	7	7	7	28
Panthers	0	7	7	13	27

at O'Brien Field, Charleston, IL

- Date: Saturday October 5, 2024
- Game time: 2:00 PM
- Game weather: Sunny, 83 °F (28 °C)
- Game attendance: 7,777
- Referee: Drew Myers
- TV announcers (ESPN+): Mike Bradd (play-by-play), Dave Kidwell (analyst) and Kacy Standohar (sideline)

Game information

First quarter

- (9:45) SEMO – DC Pippin 26 yard field goal (Drive: 14 plays, 67 yards, 5:15; SEMO 3–0)
- (3:03) SEMO – Mitchell Sellers 9 yard pass from Paxton DeLaurent, DC Pippin kick (Drive: 6 plays, 62 yards, 1:52; SEMO 10–0)
- (0:42) SEMO – Dorian Anderson 29 yard pass from Paxton DeLaurent, DC Pippin kick (Drive: 1 play, 29 yards, 0:08; SEMO 17–0)

Second quarter

- (9:35) SEMO – Cole Ruble 2 yard run, DC Pippin kick (Drive: 11 plays, 62 yards, 4:37; SEMO 24–0)
- (0:27) EIU – Cooper Willman 12 yard pass from Pierce Holley, Julian Patino kick (Drive: 9 plays, 80 yards, 1:45; SEMO 24–7)

Third quarter

- (11:40) EIU – MJ Flowers 1 yard run, Julian Patino kick (Drive: 7 plays, 75 yards, 3:20; SEMO 24–14)
- (10:02) SEMO – Tristan Smith 3 yard pass from Paxton DeLaurent, DC Pippin kick (Drive: 4 plays, 73 yards, 1:31; SEMO 31–14)

Fourth quarter

- (12:22) SEMO – Paxton DeLaurent 1 yard run, DC Pippin kick (Drive: 16 plays, 98 yards, 7:55; SEMO 38–14)
- (7:59) EIU – Quenton Rogers 39 yard pass from Pierce Holley (Drive: 9 plays, 82 yards, 4:20; SEMO 38–20)
- (2:10) EIU – MJ Flowers 2 yard run, Julian Patino kick (Drive: 2 plays, 29 yards, 0:29; SEMO 38–27)

Statistics	SEMO	EIU
First downs	26	19
Total yards	426	385
Rushing yards	61	19
Passing yards	364	366
Passing: Comp–Att–Int	30–43–1	27–42–0
Time of possession	34:02	25:58

Team	Category	Player	Statistics
Southeast Missouri State	Passing	Paxton DeLaurent	30/43, 364 yards, 3 TD, 1 INT
Southeast Missouri State	Rushing	Darrell Smith	18 carries, 63 yards
Southeast Missouri State	Receiving	Tristan Smith	8 receptions, 124 yards, 1 TD
Eastern Illinois	Passing	Pierce Holley	27/42, 366 yards, 2 TD
Eastern Illinois	Rushing	MJ Flowers	14 carries, 48 yards, 2 TD
Eastern Illinois	Receiving	MJ Flowers	11 receptions, 72 yards

=== at Tennessee State ===
Game Seven – Eastern Illinois Panthers (1–5) vs Tennessee State Tigers (4–2) – Game summary

Quarter	1	2	3	4	Total
Panthers	0	10	7	0	17
Tigers	0	20	14	7	41

at Nissan Stadium • Nashville, TN

- Date: Saturday October 12, 2024
- Game time: 5:00 p.m.
- Game weather: Sunny
- Game attendance: 10,715
- Referee: Michael Lennie
- TV announcers (ESPN+): Dan Laing (play-by-play) and Chris Sanders (analyst)

Game information

First quarter
Second quarter
Third quarter
Fourth quarter

Statistics	EIU	TNST
First downs	23	20
Total yards	435	365
Rushing yards	75	128
Passing yards	360	237
Passing: Comp–Att–Int	30–51–1	21–33–0
Time of possession	31:54	28:06

Team	Category	Player	Statistics
Eastern Illinois	Passing	Pierce Holley	28/46, 338 yards, 1 TD, 1 INT
Eastern Illinois	Rushing	MJ Flowers	21 carries, 57 yards, 1 TD
Eastern Illinois	Receiving	Cooper Willman	8 receptions, 141 yards
Tennessee State	Passing	Draylen Ellis	20/32, 224 yards, 4 TD
Tennessee State	Rushing	Jaden McGill	9 carries, 47 yards
Tennessee State	Receiving	Karate Brenson	6 receptions, 121 yards, 1 TD

=== at UT Martin ===
Game Eight – Eastern Illinois Panthers (1–6) vs UT Martin Skyhawks (4–3) – Game summary

Quarter	1	2	3	4	Total
Panthers	7	3	7	0	17
Skyhawks	7	14	10	21	52

at Graham Stadium • Martin, TN

- Date: Saturday October 26, 2024
- Game time: 2:00 p.m.
- Game weather: Cloudy, 67 °F (19 °C)
- Game attendance: 4,109
- Referee: Gabe Tomlin
- TV announcers (ESPN+): Davis Gregory (play-by-play), John Halter (analyst) and Chris Brinkley (sideline)

Game information

First quarter

- (11:55) EIU – Cooper Willman 7 yard pass from Pierce Holley, Julian Patino kick (Drive: 7 plays, 75 yards, 3:05; EIU 7–0)
- (3:55) UTM – Max Dowling 33 yard pass from Kinkead Dent, Jaren Van Winkle kick (Drive: 2 plays, 33 yards, 0:44; TIE 7–7)

Second quarter

- (13:36) UTM – Kinkead Dent 37 yard run, Jaren Van Winkle kick (Drive: 7 plays, 74 yards, 3:28; UTM 14–7)
- (10:30) UTM – Patrick Smith 3 yard run, Jaren Van Winkle kick (Drive: 3 plays, 37 yards, 1:19; UTM 21–7)
- (3:40) EIU – Julian Patino 19 yard field goal (Drive: 15 plays, 73 yards, 6:50; UTM 21–10)

Third quarter

- (12:29) UTM – Patrick Smith 1 yard run, Jaren Van Winkle kick (Drive: 5 plays, 47 yards, 2:20; UTM 28–10)
- (5:21) EIU – Alex Herrera 17 yard pass from Pierce Holley, Julian Patino kick (Drive: 6 plays, 66 yards, 2:47; UTM 28–17)
- (3:16) UTM – Jaren Van Winkle 31 yard field goal (Drive: 5 plays, 57 yards, 2:05; UTM 31–17)

Fourth quarter

- (10:35) UTM – Max Dowling 21 yard pass from Kinkead Dent, Jaren Van Winkle kick (Drive: 5 plays, 87 yards, 3:06; UTM 38–17)
- (9:37) UTM – Tyler Dostin 14 yard pass from Kinkead Dent, Jaren Van Winkle kick (Drive: 2 plays, 21 yards, 0:43; UTM 45–17)
- (6:28) UTM – Jaylon Sharpe 72 yard interception return, Jaren Van Winkle kick (Drive: 8 plays, 45 yards, 3:09; UTM 52–17)

Statistics	EIU	UTM
First downs	23	20
Total yards	396	460
Rushing yards	48	212
Passing yards	348	248
Passing: Comp–Att–Int	36–54–3	16–23–0
Time of possession	32:16	27:44

Team	Category	Player	Statistics
Eastern Illinois	Passing	Pierce Holley	36/54, 348 yards, 2 TD, 3 INT
Eastern Illinois	Rushing	MJ Flowers	14 carries, 49 yards
Eastern Illinois	Receiving	Cooper Willman	11 receptions, 143 yards, TD
UT Martin	Passing	Kinkead Dent	16/22, 248 yards, 3 TD
UT Martin	Rushing	Patrick Smith	13 carries, 87 yards, 2 TD
UT Martin	Receiving	Max Dowling	3 receptions, 70 yards, 2 TD

=== Western Illinois ===
Game Nine – Western Illinois Leathernecks (3–5) vs Eastern Illinois Panthers (1–7) – Game summary

Quarter	1	2	3	4	Total
Leathernecks	0	17	7	14	38
Panthers	7	10	14	14	45

at O'Brien Field • Charleston, IL

- Date: Saturday November 2, 2024
- Game time: 2:00 p.m.
- Game weather: Sunny, 61 °F (16 °C)
- Game attendance: 5,369
- Referee: Michael Lennie
- TV announcers (ESPN+): Mike Bradd (play-by-play) and Dave Kidwell (analyst)

Game information

First quarter
Second quarter
Third quarter
Fourth quarter

Statistics	WIU	EIU
First downs	24	22
Total yards	395	534
Rushing yards	86	196
Passing yards	309	338
Passing: Comp–Att–Int	29–43–0	19–27–0
Time of possession	30:30	29:30

Team	Category	Player	Statistics
Western Illinois	Passing	Nathan Lamb	29/43, 309 yards, 3 TD
Western Illinois	Rushing	Cameren Smith	17 carries, 66 yards, 1 TD
Western Illinois	Receiving	Elijah Aragon	9 receptions, 83 yards, 1 TD
Eastern Illinois	Passing	Pierce Holley	19/27, 338 yards, 5 TD
Eastern Illinois	Rushing	MJ Flowers	27 carries, 194 yards, 1 TD
Eastern Illinois	Receiving	Alex Ginnever	6 receptions, 100 yards, 2 TD

=== at Gardner–Webb ===
Game Ten – Eastern Illinois Panthers (2–7) vs Gardner–Webb Runnin' Bulldogs (3–6) – Game summary

Quarter	1	2	3	4	Total
Panthers	0	7	7	14	28
Runnin' Bulldogs	10	14	7	0	31

at Ernest W. Spangler Stadium • Boiling Springs, NC

- Date: Saturday November 9, 2024
- Game time: 12:30 p.m.
- Game weather: Sunny, 67 °F (19 °C)
- Game attendance: 2,451
- Referee: Brad Carrell
- TV announcers (ESPN+): TBD

Game information

First quarter
Second quarter
Third quarter
Fourth quarter

Statistics	EIU	GWEB
First downs	21	25
Total yards	465	464
Rushing yards	7	127
Passing yards	458	337
Passing: Comp–Att–Int	20–36–1	26–34–0
Time of possession	27:46	32:14

Team	Category	Player	Statistics
Eastern Illinois	Passing	Pierce Holley	20/36, 458 yards, 4 TD, 1 INT
Eastern Illinois	Rushing	MJ Flowers	15 carries, 45 yards
Eastern Illinois	Receiving	Cooper Willman	11 receptions, 291 yards, 3 TD
Gardner–Webb	Passing	Tyler Ridell	26/34, 337 yards, 1 TD
Gardner–Webb	Rushing	Carson Gresock	9 carries, 50 yards, 2 TD
Gardner–Webb	Receiving	Taylor Shields	3 receptions, 86 yards

=== Charleston Southern ===
Game Eleven – Charleston Southern Buccaneers (1–9) vs Eastern Illinois Panthers (2–8) – Game summary

Quarter	1	2	3	4	OT	Total
Buccaneers	0	6	0	7	0	13
Panthers	0	13	0	0	3	16

at O'Brien Field • Charleston, IL

- Date: Saturday November 16, 2024
- Game time: 12:00 p.m.
- Game weather: Sunny, 50 °F (10 °C)
- Game attendance: 1,895
- Referee: Zach Erdmann
- TV announcers (ESPN+): Mike Bradd (play-by-play) and Dave Kidwell (analyst)

Game information

First quarter

No scoring plays

Second quarter

- (14:55) CHSO – Reid Montgomery 37 yard field goal (Drive: 8 plays, 24 yards, 4:56; CHSO 3–0)
- (4:58) CHSO – Reid Montgomery 39 yard field goal (Drive: 4 plays, 4 yards, 1:29; CHSO 6–0)
- (1:36) EIU – MJ Flowers 2 yard run, Julian Patino kick (Drive: 10 plays, 75 yards, 3:22; EIU 7–6)
- (0:36) EIU – Alex Herrera 18 yard pass from Pierce Holley (Drive: 3 plays, 21 yards, 0:27; EIU 13–6)

Third quarter

No scoring plays

Fourth quarter

- (4:52) CHSO – Jamil Bishop 15 yard run, Reid Montgomery kick (Drive: 1 play, 15 yards, 0:08; TIED 13–13)

Overtime

- EIU – Julian Patino 18 yard field goal (Drive: 7 plays, 24 yards; EIU 16–13)

Statistics	CHSO	EIU
First downs	11	17
Total yards	201	232
Rushing yards	125	64
Passing yards	76	168
Passing: Comp–Att–Int	10–19–0	17–26–2
Time of possession	27:05	27:34

Team	Category	Player	Statistics
Charleston Southern	Passing	Rob McCoy Jr.	7/13, 52 yards
Charleston Southern	Rushing	Autavius Ison	12 carries, 42 yards
Charleston Southern	Receiving	Chris Rhone	1 reception, 18 yards
Eastern Illinois	Passing	Pierce Holley	17/23, 168 yards, 1 TD, 2 INT
Eastern Illinois	Rushing	MJ Flowers	22 carries, 73 yards, 1 TD
Eastern Illinois	Receiving	Quenton Rogers	5 receptions, 66 yards

=== at Tennessee Tech ===
Game Twelve – Eastern Illinois Panthers (3–8) vs Tennessee Tech Golden Eagles (6–5) – Game summary

Quarter	1	2	3	4	Total
Panthers	0	0	6	0	6
Golden Eagles	3	10	3	7	23

at Tucker Stadium • Cookeville, TN

- Date: Saturday November 23, 2024
- Game time: 12:00 p.m.
- Game weather: Sunny, 49 °F (9 °C)
- Game attendance: 6,790
- Referee: Gabriel Tomlin
- TV announcers (ESPN+): Dylan Vazzano (play-by-play) and Sam Brooks (analyst)

Game information

First quarter

- (12:14) TNTC – Dom LeBlanc 46 yard field goal (Drive: 6 plays, 27 yards, 2:30; TNTC 3–0)

Second quarter

- (12:33) TNTC – Dom LeBlanc 20 yard field goal (Drive: 4 plays, 1 yard, 1:25; TNTC 6–0)
- (3:49) TNTC – Jordan Yates 9 yard run, Dom LeBlanc kick (Drive: 9 plays, 80 yards, 5:05; TNTC 13–0)

Third quarter

- (7:37) TNTC – Dom LeBlanc 22 yard field goal (Drive: 8 plays, 24 yards, 2:38; TNTC 16–0)
- (2:15) EIU – Jay Pearson 2 yard run (Drive: 10 plays, 75 yards, 5:22; TNTC 16–6)

Fourth quarter

- (11:04) TNTC – Tyler Wilson 9 yard run, Dom LeBlanc kick (Drive: 2 plays, 30 yards, 0:40; TNTC 23–6)

Statistics	EIU	TNTC
First downs	18	17
Total yards	241	328
Rushing yards	80	200
Passing yards	161	128
Passing: Comp–Att–Int	18–28–1	11–20–0
Time of possession	30:23	29:37

Team	Category	Player	Statistics
Eastern Illinois	Passing	Pierce Holley	14/20, 129 yards
Eastern Illinois	Rushing	Jay Pearson	11 carries, 69 yards, 1 TD
Eastern Illinois	Receiving	Cooper Willman	9 receptions, 86 yards
Tennessee Tech	Passing	Dylan Laible	9/16, 88 yards
Tennessee Tech	Rushing	Jalen Mitchell	20 carries, 131 yards
Tennessee Tech	Receiving	Torin Baker	3 receptions, 49 yards
