= 2024 Youngstown State Penguins football team =

American college football season

2024 Youngstown State Penguins football
- Conference: Missouri Valley Football Conference
- Record: 4–8 (3–5 MVFC)
- Head coach: Doug Phillips (5th season)
- Offensive coordinator: Troy Rothenbuhler (5th season)
- Offensive scheme: Multiple
- Defensive coordinator: John Haneline (1st season)
- Base defense: 4–2–5
- Home stadium: Stambaugh Stadium

2024 Missouri Valley Football Conference standings
	Conf.			Overall
Team	W		L	W		L
No. 1 North Dakota State +^	7	–	1	14	–	2
No. 3 South Dakota State +^	7	–	1	12	–	3
No. 4 South Dakota +^	7	–	1	11	–	3
Missouri State *	6	–	2	8	–	4
No. 11 Illinois State ^	6	–	2	10	–	4
Youngstown State	3	–	5	4	–	8
Indiana State	3	–	5	4	–	8
North Dakota	2	–	6	5	–	7
Southern Illinois	2	–	6	4	–	8
Northern Iowa	1	–	7	3	–	9
Murray State	0	–	8	1	–	11
+ – Conference co-champions; ^ – FCS playoff participant; * – Ineligible for 2024 FCS playoffs due to transition to the FBS; Rankings from STATS Poll

The 2024 Youngstown State Penguins football team represented Youngstown State University as a member of the Missouri Valley Football Conference (MVFC) during the 2024 NCAA Division I FCS football season. The Penguins, led by fifth-year head coach Doug Phillips, played their games at Stambaugh Stadium located in Youngstown, Ohio.

== Preseason ==
=== MVFC poll ===
The Missouri Valley Football Conference released its preseason poll on July 22, 2024, voted on by league athletic directors, coaches, and media members. The Penguins were predicted to finish seventh in the conference.

== Schedule ==
Date	Time	Opponent	Rank	Site	TV	Result	Attendance
August 29	6:00 p.m.	at No. 6 Villanova*	No. 25	Villanova Stadium; Villanova, PA	FloSports	L 17–24	5,421
September 7	2:00 p.m.	Valparaiso*	No. 25	Stambaugh Stadium; Youngstown, OH	ESPN+	W 59–25	7,649
September 14	2:00 p.m.	Duquesne*	No. 21	Stambaugh Stadium; Youngstown, OH	ESPN+	L 25–28	12,415
September 21	3:30 p.m.	at Pittsburgh*		Acrisure Stadium; Pittsburgh, PA	ACCNX	L 17–73	48,437
September 28	3:00 p.m.	at Missouri State		Robert W. Plaster Stadium; Springfield, MO	ESPN+	L 31–38	12,117
October 5	2:00 p.m.	Indiana State^{†}		Stambaugh Stadium; Youngstown, OH	ESPN+	W 21–14	8,202
October 12	3:00 p.m.	at No. 1 South Dakota State		Dana J. Dykhouse Stadium; Brookings, SD	ESPN+	L 13–63	19,331
October 19	6:00 p.m.	No. 4 South Dakota		Stambaugh Stadium; Youngstown, OH	ESPN+	L 17–27	8,560
October 26	6:00 p.m.	No. 7 North Dakota		Stambaugh Stadium; Youngstown, OH	ESPN+	W 41–40 ^{OT}	9,979
November 2	3:00 p.m.	at No. 21 Illinois State		Hancock Stadium; Normal, IL	ESPN+	L 16–23	6,381
November 9	1:00 p.m.	at Southern Illinois		Saluki Stadium; Carbondale, IL	ESPN+	L 33–37	4,933
November 16	12:00 p.m.	Northern Iowa		Stambaugh Stadium; Youngstown, OH	ESPN+	W 39–38 ^{OT}	7,038
*Non-conference game; ^{†}Homecoming; Rankings from STATS Poll released prior to the game; All times are in Eastern time

== Game summaries ==
All times are Eastern time.

=== at No. 6 Villanova ===
No. 25 Youngstown State Penguins (0–0) at No. 6 Villanova Wildcats (0–0) – Game summary

Quarter	1	2	3	4	Total
No. 25 Penguins	0	3	7	7	17
No. 6 Wildcats	10	7	7	0	24

at Villanova Stadium, Villanova, PA

- Date: August 29
- Game time: 6:00 p.m.
- Game weather: Cloudy • Temperature: 77 °F (25 °C) • Wind: NE at 9 miles per hour (14 km/h)
- Game attendance: 5,421
- Referee: Henry Wimberg
- TV announcers (FloSports): John Fanta (play-by-play) and Steve Pinone (analyst)
- Box score, Recap

Game information
First quarter
- (8:57) VILL – Ethan Gettman 42-yard field goal (Drive: 6 plays, 42 yards, 2:43; VILL 3–0)
- (1:23) VILL – Connor Watkins 14-yard run, Ethan Gettman kick (Drive: 7 plays, 79 yards, 4:04; VILL 10–0)

Second quarter

- (6:28) YSU – Andrew Lastovka 27-yard field goal (Drive: 15 plays, 65 yards, 9:47; VILL 10–3)
- (2:20) VILL – Isaiah Ragland 3-yard run, Ethan Gettman kick (Drive: 7 plays, 45 yards, 3:57; VILL 17–3)

Third quarter

- (10:52) VILL – Connor Watkins 29-yard run, Ethan Gettman kick (Drive: 4 plays, 88 yards, 2:23; VILL 24–3)
- (1:30) YSU – Cyrus Traugh 18-yard pass from Beau Brungard, Andrew Lastovka kick (Drive: 15 plays, 72 yards, 9:14; VILL 24–10)

Fourth quarter

- (4:24) YSU – Tyshon King 1-yard run, Andrew Lastovka kick (Drive: 10 plays, 80 yards, 5:18; VILL 24–17)

Statistics	YSU	VILL
First downs	21	15
Total yards	321	336
Rushing yards	169	246
Passing yards	152	90
Passing: Comp–Att–Int	18–25–2	6–17–0
Time of possession	36:12	23:48

Team	Category	Player	Statistics
Youngstown State	Passing	Beau Brungard	18/25, 152 yards, TD, 2 INT
Youngstown State	Rushing	Beau Brungard	16 carries, 82 yards
Youngstown State	Receiving	Cyrus Traugh	3 receptions, 42 yards, TD
Villanova	Passing	Connor Watkins	6/17, 90 yards
Villanova	Rushing	Connor Watkins	10 carries, 107 yards, 2 TD
Villanova	Receiving	Jabriel Mace	1 reception, 35 yards

=== Valparaiso ===
Valparaiso Beacons (0–1) vs. No. 25 Youngstown State Penguins (0–1) – Game summary

Quarter	1	2	3	4	Total
Beacons	0	22	3	0	25
No. 25 Penguins	21	14	7	17	59

at Stambaugh Stadium, Youngstown, OH

- Date: September 7
- Game time: 2:00 p.m.
- Game weather: Cloudy • Temperature: 60 °F (16 °C) • Wind: NW at 10 miles per hour (16 km/h)
- Game attendance: 7,649
- Referee: John Shay
- TV announcers (ESPN+): Drae Smith (play-by-play) and Chris Sammarone (analyst)
- Box score, Recap

Game information
First quarter
- (14:44) YSU – Stephon Hall 4-yard fumble return, Andrew Lastovka kick (Drive: 1 play, -21 yards, 0:09; YSU 7–0)
- (9:03) YSU – Max Tomczak 73-yard pass from Beau Brungard, Andrew Lastovka kick (Drive: 6 plays, 87 yards, 3:42; YSU 14–0)
- (2:00) YSU – Beau Brungard 4-yard run, Andrew Lastovka kick (Drive: 9 plays, 58 yards, 6:03; YSU 21–0)

Second quarter

- (12:24) VAL – Gary Givens III 39-yard pass from Caron Tyler, Ryan Mann pass to Jake Vickers for two-point conversion (Drive: 9 plays, 76 yards, 4:29; YSU 21–8)
- (8:37) VAL – Caron Tyler 7-yard run, Ryan Hawk kick (Drive: 4 plays, 60 yards, 2:09; YSU 21–15)
- (6:05) YSU – Beau Brungard 65-yard run, Andrew Lastovka kick (Drive: 5 plays, 75 yards, 2:25; YSU 28–15)
- (2:30) Valparaiso – Caron Tyler 55-yard run, Ryan Hawk kick (Drive: 6 plays, 79 yards, 3:29; YSU 28–22)
- (1:49) YSU – Ethan Wright 64-yard run, Andrew Lastovka kick (Drive: 3 plays, 75 yards, 0:41; YSU 35–22)

Third quarter

- (14:14) YSU – Beau Brungard 66-yard run, Andrew Lastovka kick (Drive: 2 plays, 69 yards, 0:36; YSU 42–22)
- (6:15) VAL – Ryan Hawk 26-yard field goal (Drive: 7 plays, 63 yards, 3:10; YSU 42–25)

Fourth quarter

- (11:46) YSU – Max Tomczak 8-yard pass from Beau Brungard, Andrew Lastovka kick (Drive: 8 plays, 61 yards, 4:36; YSU 49–25)
- (5:56) YSU – Jaden Gilbert 36-yard run, Andrew Lastovka kick (Drive: 7 plays, 83 yards, 4:12; YSU 56–25)
- (1:59) YSU – Andrew Lastovka 29-yard field goal (Drive: 5 plays, 21 yards, 2:37; YSU 59–25)

Statistics	VAL	YSU
First downs	13	19
Total yards	331	554
Rushing yards	164	429
Passing yards	167	125
Passing: Comp–Att–Int	9–23–1	11–14–0
Time of possession	26:25	33:25

Team	Category	Player	Statistics
Valparaiso	Passing	Caron Tyler	8/17, 160 yards, TD, INT
Valparaiso	Rushing	Caron Tyler	15 carries, 46 yards
Valparaiso	Receiving	Gary Givens III	3 receptions, 71 yards, TD
Youngstown State	Passing	Beau Brungard	11/14, 125 yards, 2 TD
Youngstown State	Rushing	Beau Brungard	10 carries, 194 yards, 3 TD
Youngstown State	Receiving	Max Tomczak	4 receptions, 98 yards, 2 TD

=== Duquesne ===
Duquesne Dukes (0–2) vs. No. 21 Youngstown State Penguins (1–1) – Game summary

Quarter	1	2	3	4	Total
Dukes	7	7	7	7	28
No. 21 Penguins	3	14	0	8	25

at Stambaugh Stadium, Youngstown, OH

- Date: September 14
- Game time: 2:00 p.m.
- Game weather: Sunny • Temperature: 81 °F (27 °C) • Wind: SE at 10 miles per hour (16 km/h)
- Game attendance: 12,415
- Referee: David Hergert
- TV announcers (ESPN+): Drae Smith (play-by-play)
- Box score, Recap

Game information
First quarter
- (6:57) YSU – Andrew Lastovka 45-yard field goal (Drive: 8 plays, 43 yards, 03:48; YSU 3–0)
- (6:05) DUQ – Shawn Solomon, Jr. 3-yard run, Brian Bruzdewicz kick (Drive: 2 plays, 75 yards, 00:46; DUQ 7–3)

Second quarter

- (13:23) YSU – Beau Brungard 1-yard run, Andrew Lastovka kick (Drive: 13 plays, 71 yards, 07:35; YSU 10–7)
- (1:56) YSU – Tyshon King 5-yard run, Andrew Lastovka kick (Drive: 14 plays, 76 yards, 08:37; YSU 17–7)
- (0:20) DUQ – Tedy Afful 3-yard pass from Darius Perrantes, Brian Bruzdewicz kick (Drive: 9 plays, 75 yards, 01:30; YSU 17–14)

Third quarter

- (1:21) DUQ – Tedy Afful 5-yard pass from Darius Perrantes, Brian Bruzdewicz kick (Drive: 11 plays, 80 yards, 05:05; DUQ 21–17)

Fourth quarter

- (1:40) DUQ – JaMario Clements 75-yard run, Brian Bruzdewicz kick (Drive: 4 plays, 92 yards, 01:28; DUQ 28–17)
- (0:20) YSU – Tyshon King 1-yard run, Beau Brungard pass to Max Tomczak for two-point conversion (Drive: 11 plays, 75 yards, 01:20; DUQ 28–25)

Statistics	DUQ	YSU
First downs	17	26
Total yards	346	371
Rushing yards	189	178
Passing yards	157	193
Passing: Comp–Att–Int	17–26–0	19–31–1
Time of possession	17:43	42:17

Team	Category	Player	Statistics
Duquesne	Passing	Darius Perrantes	17/26, 157 yards, 2 TD
Duquesne	Rushing	JaMario Clements	12 carries, 204 yards, TD
Duquesne	Receiving	Tedy Afful	7 receptions, 56 yards, 2 TD
Youngstown State	Passing	Beau Brungard	19/29, 193 yards, INT
Youngstown State	Rushing	Tyshon King	15 carries, 67 yards, 2 TD
Youngstown State	Receiving	Max Tomczak	5 receptions, 62 yards

=== at Pittsburgh (FBS) ===
Youngstown State Penguins (1–2) at Pittsburgh Panthers (FBS) (3–0) – Game summary

Quarter	1	2	3	4	Total
Penguins	0	10	7	0	17
Panthers (FBS)	21	21	10	21	73

at Acrisure Stadium, Pittsburgh, PA

- Date: Saturday September 21, 2024
- Game time: 3:30 p.m.
- Game weather: Sunny • Temperature: 84 °F (29 °C) • Wind: SW at 6 miles per hour (9.7 km/h)
- Game attendance: 48,437
- Referee: Justin Elliott
- TV announcers (ACCNX/ESPN+): Doug Sherman (play-by-play) and Forrest Conoly (analyst)
- Box score

Game information
First quarter
- (11:27) PITT – Raphael Williams Jr. 6-yard pass from Eli Holstein, Ben Sauls kick (Drive: 11 plays, 75 yards, 3:33; PITT 7–0)
- (8:30) PITT – Daniel Carter 24-yard run, Ben Sauls kick (Drive: 2 plays, 42 yards, 0:29; PITT 14–0)
- (3:33) PITT – Eli Holstein 2-yard run, Ben Sauls kick (Drive: 7 plays, 61 yards, 3:03; PITT 21–0)

Second quarter

- (12:33) YSU – Andrew Lastovka 46-yard field goal (Drive: 11 plays, 47 yards, 6:00; PITT 21–3)
- (10:34) PITT – Kenny Johnson 10-yard pass from Eli Holstein, Ben Sauls kick (Drive: 5 plays, 74 yards, 1:54; PITT 28–3)
- (8:08) PITT – Daniel Carter 43-yard run, Ben Sauls kick (Drive: 2 plays, 43 yards, 0:17; PITT 35–3)
- (1:52) YSU – Cyrus Traugh 25-yard pass from Beau Brungard, Andrew Lastovka kick (Drive: 11 plays, 75 yards, 6:16; PITT 35–10)
- (1:34) PITT – Censere Lee 82-yard pass from Eli Holstein, Ben Sauls kick (Drive: 1 play, 82 yards, 0:13; PITT 42–10)

Third quarter

- (9:23) YSU – Cyrus Traugh 44-yard pass from Beau Brungard, Andrew Lastovka kick (Drive: 2 plays, 47 yards, 0:53; PITT 42–17)
- (6:52) PITT – Ben Sauls 49-yard field goal (Drive: 7 plays, 37 yards, 2:26; PITT 45–17)
- (1:32) PITT – Eli Holstein 2-yard run, Ben Sauls kick (Drive: 9 plays, 83 yards, 3:13; PITT 52–17)

Fourth quarter

- (10:30) PITT – Daniel Carter 13-yard pass from Nate Yarnell, Ben Sauls kick (Drive: 9 plays, 92 yards, 2:55; PITT 59–17)
- (8:36) PITT – Tamarion Crumpley 22-yard interception return, Ben Sauls kick (Drive: 4 plays, 10 yards, 1:49; PITT 66–17)
- (3:35) PITT – Che Nwabuko 57-yard run, Sam Carpenter kick (Drive: 6 plays, 85 yards, 2:42; PITT 73–17)

Statistics	YSU	PITT
First downs	18	28
Total yards	309	644
Rushing yards	71	295
Passing yards	238	349
Passing: Comp–Att–Int	20–31–2	24–35–0
Time of possession	37:29	22:31

Team	Category	Player	Statistics
Youngstown State	Passing	Beau Brungard	18/28, 233 yards, 2 TD, INT
Youngstown State	Rushing	Ethan Wright	7 carries, 35 yards
Youngstown State	Receiving	Cyrus Traugh	4 receptions, 87 yards, 2 TD
Pittsburgh	Passing	Eli Holstein	16/24, 247 yards, 3 TD
Pittsburgh	Rushing	Daniel Carter	7 carries, 109 yards, 2 TD
Pittsburgh	Receiving	Censere Lee	4 receptions, 108 yards, TD

=== at Missouri State ===
Youngstown State Penguins (1–3) at Missouri State Bears (2–2) – Game summary

Quarter	1	2	3	4	Total
Penguins	7	7	3	14	31
Bears	7	17	0	14	38

at Robert W. Plaster Stadium, Springfield, MO

- Date: September 28
- Game time: 3:00 p.m.
- Game weather: Cloudy • Temperature: 75 °F (24 °C) • Wind: N at 14 miles per hour (23 km/h)
- Game attendance: 12,117
- Referee: Gregory Gompf
- TV announcers (ESPN+): Scott Warmann (play-by-play) and Don Patterson (analyst)
- Box score, Recap

Game information
First quarter
- (6:38) YSU – Beau Brungard 9-yard run, Andrew Lastovka kick (Drive: 15 plays, 75 yards, 8:22; YSU 7–0)
- (3:54) MOST – Jacardia Wright 27-yard run, Yousef Obeid kick (Drive: 5 plays, 65 yards, 2:44; Tied 7–7)

Second quarter

- (9:02) MOST – Jayden Becks 57-yard pass from Jacob Clark, Yousef Obeid kick (Drive: 2 plays, 95 yards, 0:51; MOST 14–7)
- (3:59) YSU – Tyshon King 8-yard run, Andrew Lastovka kick (Drive: 9 plays, 76 yards, 4:57; Tied 14–14)
- (1:42) MOST – Lance Mason 30-yard pass from Jacob Clark, Yousef Obeid kick (Drive: 6 plays, 75 yards, 2:17; MOST 21–14)
- (0:00) MOST – Yousef Obeid 19-yard field goal (Drive: 6 plays, 63 yards, 0:46; MOST 24–14)

Third quarter

- (4:02) YSU – Andrew Lastovka 38-yard field goal (Drive: 11 plays, 41 yards, 5:44; MOST 24–17)

Fourth quarter

- (14:56) MOST – Jmariyae Robinson 4-yard run, Yousef Obeid kick (Drive: 8 plays, 74 yards, 3:58; MOST 31–17)
- (9:20) YSU – Ethan Wright 3-yard run, Andrew Lastovka kick (Drive: 11 plays, 76 yards, 5:31; MOST 31–24)
- (5:46) YSU – Beau Brungard 44-yard run, Andrew Lastovka kick (Drive: 5 plays, 76 yards, 2:12; Tied 31–31)
- (0:08) MOST – Lance Mason 5-yard pass from Jacob Clark, Yousef Obeid kick (Drive: 5 plays, 53 yards, 0:54; MOST 38–31)

Statistics	YSU	MOST
First downs	25	20
Total yards	424	464
Rushing yards	244	139
Passing yards	180	325
Passing: Comp–Att–Int	18–31–1	21–30–0
Time of possession	40:37	19:23

Team	Category	Player	Statistics
Youngstown State	Passing	Beau Brungard	18/31, 180 yards, INT
Youngstown State	Rushing	Beau Brungard	16 carries, 110 yards, 2 TD
Youngstown State	Receiving	Max Tomczak	4 receptions, 59 yards
Missouri State	Passing	Jacob Clark	21/29, 325 yards, 3 TD
Missouri State	Rushing	Jacob Clark	7 carries, 63 yards
Missouri State	Receiving	Jmariyae Robinson	3 receptions, 104 yards

=== Indiana State ===
Indiana State Sycamores (1–3) vs. Youngstown State Penguins (1–4) – Game summary

Quarter	1	2	3	4	Total
Sycamores	0	0	14	0	14
Penguins	7	14	0	0	21

at Stambaugh Stadium, Youngstown, OH

- Date: October 5
- Game time: 2:00 p.m.
- Game weather: Sunny • Temperature: 70 °F (21 °C) • Wind: NE at 5 miles per hour (8.0 km/h)
- Game attendance: 8,202
- Referee: Aaron Adams
- TV announcers (ESPN+): Drae Smith (play-by-play) and Chris Sammarone (analyst)
- Box score, Recap

Game information
First quarter
- (8:47) YSU – Ethan Wright 2-yard run, Andrew Lastovka kick (Drive: 9 plays, 47 yards, 4:43; YSU 7–0)

Second quarter

- (14:52) YSU – Latrell Fordham 8-yard pass from Beau Brungard, Andrew Lastovka kick (Drive: 11 plays, 74 yards, 6:02; YSU 14–0)
- (0:39) YSU – Ethan Wright 2-yard run, Andrew Lastovka kick (Drive: 5 plays, 56 yards, 1:59; YSU 21–0)

Third quarter

- (9:12) INST – Plez Lawrence 34-yard pass from Elijah Owens, Jake Andjelic kick (Drive: 8 plays, 77 yards, 3:46, YSU 21–7)
- (4:29) INST – Elijah Owens 4-yard run, Jake Andjelic kick (Drive: 6 plays, 73 yards, 3:06; YSU 21–14)

Fourth quarter

- No scoring plays

Statistics	INST	YSU
First downs	15	16
Total yards	184	305
Rushing yards	135	175
Passing yards	149	130
Passing: Comp–Att–Int	15–27–0	11–18–1
Time of possession	30:20	29:40

Team	Category	Player	Statistics
Indiana State	Passing	Elijah Owens	15/28, 149 yards, TD
Indiana State	Rushing	Elijah Owens	26 carries, 114 yards, TD
Indiana State	Receiving	Plez Lawrence	4 receptions, 84 yards, TD
Youngstown State	Passing	Beau Brungard	11/18, 130 yards, TD, INT
Youngstown State	Rushing	Ethan Wright	15 carries, 81 yards, 2 TD
Youngstown State	Receiving	Max Tomczak	4 receptions, 87 yards

=== at No. 1 South Dakota State ===
Youngstown State Penguins (2–4) at No. 1 South Dakota State Jackrabbits (4–1) – Game summary

Quarter	1	2	3	4	Total
Penguins	3	7	0	3	13
No. 1 Jackrabbits	21	14	14	14	63

at Dana J. Dykhouse Stadium, Brookings, SD

- Date: October 12
- Game time: 3:00 p.m.
- Game weather: Cloudy • Temperature: 65 °F (18 °C) • Wind: E at 4 miles per hour (6.4 km/h)
- Game attendance: 19,331
- Referee: Tyler Downs
- TV announcers (ESPN+): TBD
- Box score, Recap

Game information
First quarter
- (14:47) SDST – Angel Johnson 99-yard kickoff return, Hunter Dustman kick (SDST 7–0)
- (11:22) SDST – Chase Mason 38-yard run, Hunter Dustman kick (Drive: 4 plays, 75 yards, 1:57; SDST 14–0)
- (4:32) YSU – Andrew Lastovka 39-yard field goal (Drive: 13 plays, 54 yards, 6:50; SDST 14–3)
- (0:34) SDST – Mark Gronowski 1-yard run, Hunter Dustman kick (Drive: 9 plays, 79 yards, 3:52; SDST 21–3)

Second quarter

- (11:27) SDST – Amar Johnson 5-yard run, Hunter Dustman kick (Drive: 4 plays, 25 yards, 1:41; SDST 28–3)
- (2:56) SDST – Chase Mason 48-yard run, Hunter Dustman kick (Drive: 9 plays, 95 yards, 4:18; SDST 35–3)
- (0:14) YSU – Beau Brungard 4-yard run, Andrew Lastovka kick (Drive: 8 plays, 91 yards, 2:38; SDST 35–10)

Third quarter

- (8:12) SDST – Gram Goering 45-yard pass from Mark Gronowski, Hunter Dustman kick (Drive: 5 plays, 90 yards, 2:35; SDST 42–10)
- (0:49) SDST – Griffin Wilde 19-yard pass from Mark Gronowski, Hunter Dustman kick (Drive: 2 plays, 93 yards, 0:39; SDST 49–10)

Fourth quarter

- (10:16) SDST – Marcus Preston 4-yard pass from Chase Mason Jack Stevens kick (Drive: 5 plays, 80 yards, 3:05; SDST 56–10)
- (3:08) YSU – Andrew Lastovka 31-yard field goal (Drive: 12 plays, 53 yards, 7:08; SDST 56–13)
- (2:02) SDST – Davin Stoffel 14-yard pass from Jon Bell, Jack Stevens kick (Drive: 1 play, 14 yards, 0:04; SDST 63–10)

Statistics	YSU	SDST
First downs	20	21
Total yards	372	557
Rushing yards	183	404
Passing yards	189	153
Passing: Comp–Att–Int	18–29–1	11–18–0
Time of possession	40:14	19:46

Team	Category	Player	Statistics
Youngstown State	Passing	Beau Brungard	16/27, 169 yards, INT
Youngstown State	Rushing	Beau Brungard	11 carries, 59 yards, TD
Youngstown State	Receiving	Max Tomczak	6 receptions, 78 yards
South Dakota State	Passing	Mark Gronowski	8/13, 127 yards, 2 TD
South Dakota State	Rushing	Chase Mason	5 carries, 161 yards, 2 TD
South Dakota State	Receiving	Griffin Wilde	5 receptions, 62 yards, TD

=== No. 4 South Dakota ===
No. 4 South Dakota Coyotes (5–1) vs. Youngstown State Penguins (2–5) – Game summary

Quarter	1	2	3	4	Total
No. 4 Coyotes	0	14	10	3	27
Penguins	7	10	0	0	17

at Stambaugh Stadium, Youngstown, OH

- Date: October 19
- Game time: 6:00 p.m.
- Game weather: Clear • Temperature: 64 °F (18 °C) • Wind: W at 3 miles per hour (4.8 km/h)
- Game attendance: 8,560
- Referee: Jason Berg
- TV announcers (ESPN+): TBD
- Box score, Recap

Game information
First quarter
- (8:57) YSU – Brandan Serrano 15-yard pass from Beau Brungard, Andrew Lastovka kick (Drive: 11 plays, 82 yards, 5:59; YSU 7–0

Second quarter

- (12:23) YSU – Beau Brungard 11-yard run, Andrew Lastovka kick (Drive: 13 plays, 81 yards, 8:27; YSU 14–0)
- (9:22) SDAK – Quaron Adams 48-yard pass from Aidan Bouman, Will Leyland kick (Drive: 5 plays, 82 yards, 2:55; YSU 14–7)
- (4:07) SDAK – Charles Pierre Jr. 21-yard run, Will Leyland kick (Drive: 6 plays, 62 yards, 2:52; Tied 14–14)
- (0:04) YSU – Andrew Lastovka 39-yard field goal (Drive: 6 plays, 12 yards, 1:10; YSU 17–14)

Third quarter

- (7:16) SDAK – Will Leyland 23-yard field goal (Drive: 14 plays, 60 yards, 7:40; Tied 17–17)
- (5:10) SDAK – Charles Pierre Jr. 50-yard run, Will Leyland kick (Drive: 2 plays, 81 yards, 0:52; SDAK 24–17)

Fourth quarter

- (4:05) SDAK – Will Leyland 35-yard field goal (Drive: 7 plays, 63 yards, 2:53; SDAK 27–17)

Statistics	SDAK	YSU
First downs	19	22
Total yards	415	346
Rushing yards	192	138
Passing yards	223	208
Passing: Comp–Att–Int	12–18–0	22–32–0
Time of possession	26:01	33:59

Team	Category	Player	Statistics
South Dakota	Passing	Aidan Bouman	12/18, 223 yards, TD
South Dakota	Rushing	Charles Pierre Jr.	21 carries, 153 yards, 2 TD
South Dakota	Receiving	JJ Galbreath	3 receptions, 79 yards
Youngstown State	Passing	Beau Brungard	22/31, 208 yards, TD
Youngstown State	Rushing	Beau Brungard	16 carries, 69 yards, TD
Youngstown State	Receiving	Max Tomczak	9 receptions, 90 yards

=== No. 7 North Dakota ===
No. 7 North Dakota Fighting Hawks (5–2) vs. Youngstown State Penguins (2–6) – Game summary

Quarter	1	2	3	4	OT	Total
No. 7 Fighting Hawks	7	13	7	7	6	40
Penguins	7	14	10	3	7	41

at Stambaugh Stadium, Youngstown, OH

- Date: October 26
- Game time: 6:00 p.m.
- Game weather: Cloudy • Temperature: 53 °F (12 °C) • Wind: NW at 10 miles per hour (16 km/h)
- Game attendance: 9,979
- Referee: Gregory Gompf
- TV announcers (ESPN+): Jody Norstedt (play-by-play) and Jalen Morrison (analyst)
- Box score, Recap

Game information
First quarter
- (8:47) YSU – Cyrus Traugh 7-yard pass from Beau Brungard, Andrew Lastovka kick (Drive: 13 plays, 75 yards, 6:13; YSU 7–0)
- (4:47) UND – Gaven Ziebarth 5-yard run, C.J. Elrichs kick (Drive: 7 plays, 75 yards, 4:00; Tied 7–7)

Second quarter

- (13:04) UND – Gaven Ziebarth 1-yard run, C.J. Elrichs kick failed (Drive: 11 plays, 59 yards, 5:51; UND 13–7)
- (7:03) YSU – Beau Brungard 13-yard run, Andrew Lastovka kick (Drive: 10 plays, 86 yards, 5:53; YSU 14–13)
- (1:15) UND – Isaiah Smith 19-yard pass from Simon Romfo, C.J. Elrichs kick (Drive: 11 plays, 90 yards, 5:43; UND 20–14)
- (0:06) YSU – Beau Brungard 28-yard run, Andrew Lastovka kick (Drive: 8 plays, 72 yards, 1:09; YSU 21–20)

Third quarter

- (10:06) UND – Bo Belquist 6-yard pass from Simon Romfo, C.J. Elrichs kick (Drive: 3 plays, 19 yards, 1:22; UND 27–21)
- (4:49) YSU – Beau Brungard 2-yard run, Andrew Lastovka kick (Drive: 9 plays, 75 yards, 5:17; YSU 28–27)
- (0:13) YSU – Andrew Lastovka 34-yard field goal (Drive: 4 plays, 8 yards, 2:10; YSU 31–27)

Fourth quarter

- (9:13) UND – Gaven Ziebarth 2-yard run, C.J. Elrichs kick (Drive: 13 plays, 65 yards, 6:00; UND 34–31)
- (0:12) YSU – Andrew Lastovka 35-yard field goal (Drive: 10 plays, 65 yards, 3:31; Tied 34–34)

Overtime

- YSU – Tyshon King 1-yard run, Andrew Lastovka kick (Drive: 5 plays, 25 yards; YSU 41–34)
- UND – Bo Belquist 1-yard pass from Simon Romfo, Simon Romfo conversion pass failed (Drive: 5 plays, 25 yards; YSU 41–40)

Statistics	UND	YSU
First downs	21	23
Total yards	356	406
Rushing yards	144	334
Passing yards	212	72
Passing: Comp–Att–Int	19–24–0	8–13–1
Time of possession	32:28	27:32

Team	Category	Player	Statistics
North Dakota	Passing	Simon Romfo	19/24, 212 yards, 3 TD
North Dakota	Rushing	Isaiah Smith	9 carries, 63 yards
North Dakota	Receiving	Bo Belquist	10 receptions, 105 yards, 2 TD
Youngstown State	Passing	Beau Brungard	8/12, 72 yards, TD, INT
Youngstown State	Rushing	Beau Brungard	18 carries, 176 yards, 3 TD
Youngstown State	Receiving	Cyrus Traugh	3 receptions, 27 yards, TD

=== at No. 21 Illinois State ===
Youngstown State Penguins (3–6) at No. 21 Illinois State Redbirds (5–3) – Game summary

Quarter	1	2	3	4	Total
Penguins	2	0	7	7	16
No. 21 Redbirds	3	6	14	0	23

at Hancock Stadium, Normal, IL

- Date: November 2
- Game time: 3:00 p.m.
- Game weather: Sunny • Temperature: 60 °F (16 °C)
- Game attendance: 6,381
- Referee: John Shay
- TV announcers (ESPN+): Kurt Pegler (play-by-play), Clay Harbor (analyst) and Joey Lindstrom (sideline)
- Box score, Recap

Game information
First quarter
- (11:21) YSU – Jaylen Castleberry safety (YSU 2–0)
- (2:03) ILST – Ian Wagner 33-yard field goal (Drive: 6 plays, 26 yards, 1:48; ILST 3–2)

Second quarter

- (11:44) ILST – Wenkers Wright 3-yard pass from Tommy Rittenhouse, Ian Wagner kick failed (Drive: 8 plays, 71 yards, 3:38; ILST 9–2)

Third quarter

- (13:05) ILST – Tommy Rittenhouse 11-yard run, Ian Wagner kick (Drive: 5 plays, 75 yards, 1:55; ILST 16–2
- (3:38) ILST – Javon Charles 4-yard pass from Tommy Rittenhouse, Ian Wagner kick (Drive: 8 plays, 75 yards, 3:49; ILST 23–9)

Fourth quarter[

- (4:34) YSU – Max Tomczak 7-yard pass from Beau Brungard, Andrew Lastovka kick (Drive: 10 plays, 67 yards, 3:10; ILST 23–16)

Statistics	YSU	ILST
First downs	20	17
Total yards	299	346
Rushing yards	142	193
Passing yards	157	153
Passing: Comp–Att–Int	19–32–1	15–19–1
Time of possession	36:55	23:05

Team	Category	Player	Statistics
Youngstown State	Passing	Beau Brungard	19/32, 157 yards, TD, INT
Youngstown State	Rushing	Tyshon King	12 carries, 59 yards, TD
Youngstown State	Receiving	Max Tomczak	8 receptions, 73 yards, TD
Illinois State	Passing	Tommy Rittenhouse	15/19, 153 yards, 2 TD, INT
Illinois State	Rushing	Wenkers Wright	10 carries, 104 yards
Illinois State	Receiving	Daniel Sobkowicz	4 receptions, 81 yards

=== at Southern Illinois ===
Youngstown State Penguins (3–7) at Southern Illinois Salukis (2–7) – Game summary

Quarter	1	2	3	4	Total
Penguins	14	16	3	0	33
Salukis	0	12	6	19	37

at Saluki Stadium, Carbondale, IL

- Date: November 9
- Game time: 1:00 p.m.
- Game weather: Sunny • Temperature: 58 °F (14 °C) • Wind: SW at 8 miles per hour (13 km/h)
- Game attendance: 4,933
- Referee: Jason Perkins
- TV announcers (ESPN+): Drae Smith (play-by-play) and Chris Sammarone (analyst)
- Box score, Recap

Game information
First quarter
- (12:18) YSU – Beau Brungard 3-yard run, Andrew Lastovka kick (Drive: 6 plays, 66 yards, 2:32; YSU 7–0)
- (3:43) YSU – Beau Brungard 27-yard run, Andrew Lastovka kick (Drive: 7 plays, 46 yards, 4:30; YSU 14–0)

Second quarter

- (10:21) YSU – Beau Brungard 26-yard run, Andrew Lastovka kick (Drive: 11 plays, 80 yards, 6:12; YSU 21–0)
- (3:59) YSU – Tyshon King 3-yard pass from Beau Brungard, Andrew Lastovka kick (Drive: 6 plays, 61 yards, 3:25; YSU 28–0)
- (2:12) SIU – Jake Curry 6-yard run, two-point conversion failed (Drive: 4 plays, 75 yards, 1:47; YSU 28–6)
- (0:16) SIU – Allen Middleton 20-yard pass from Jake Curry, two-point conversion failed (Drive: 3 plays, 75 yards, 0:22; YSU 28–12)
- (0:16) YSU – Michael Well 96-yard defensive two-point conversion return (YSU 30–12)

Third quarter

- (9:13) SIU – Jimmy Athans 3-yard run, two-point conversion failed (Drive: 8 plays, 77 yards, 2:57; YSU 30–18)
- (2:45) YSU – Andrew Lastovka 38-yard field goal (Drive: 9 plays, 60 yards, 3:13; YSU 33–18)

Fourth quarter

- (14:15) SIU – Jerrian Parker 1-yard run, Paul Geelen kick (Drive: 9 plays, 75 yards, 3:30; YSU 33–25)
- (2:59) SIU – Colton Hoag 18-yard pass from Jake Curry, two-point conversion failed (Drive: 5 plays, 66 yards, 1:24; YSU 33–31)
- (1:04) SIU – Bradley Clark 20-yard pass from Jake Curry, two-point conversion failed (Drive: 3 plays, 65 yards, 0:39; SIU 37–33)

Statistics	YSU	SIU
First downs	24	24
Total yards	478	488
Rushing yards	212	166
Passing yards	266	322
Passing: Comp–Att–Int	18–31–2	19–26–1
Time of possession	38:02	21:58

Team	Category	Player	Statistics
Youngstown State	Passing	Beau Brungard	18/31, 266 yards, TD, 2 INT
Youngstown State	Rushing	Beau Brungard	22 carries, 121 yards, 3 TD
Youngstown State	Receiving	Max Tomczak	9 receptions, 154 yards
Southern Illinois	Passing	Jake Curry	19/26, 322 yards, 3 TD, INT
Southern Illinois	Rushing	Jake Curry	10 carries, 78 yards, TD
Southern Illinois	Receiving	Allen Middleton	7 receptions, 102 yards, TD

=== Northern Iowa ===
Northern Iowa Panthers (2–8) vs. Youngstown State Penguins (3–8) – Game summary

Quarter	1	2	3	4	OT	Total
Panthers	0	7	14	10	7	38
Penguins	7	7	0	17	8	39

at Stambaugh Stadium, Youngstown, OH

- Date: November 16
- Game time: 12:00 p.m.
- Game weather: Cloudy • Temperature: 50 °F (10 °C) • Windy: NW at 8 miles per hour (13 km/h)
- Game attendance: 7,038
- Referee: David Hergert
- TV announcers (ESPN+): Brad Wells (play-by-play), Don Patterson (analyst) and Kelly Burke (sideline)
- Box score, Recap

Game information
First quarter
- (8:53) YSU – Beau Brungard 17-yard run, Andrew Lastovka kick (Drive: 10 plays, 75 yards, 6:07; YSU 7–0)

Second quarter

- (12:19) YSU – Beau Brungard 1-yard run, Andrew Lastovka kick (Drive: 13 plays, 86 yards, 7:31; YSU 14–0)
- (0:20) UNI – Desmond Hutson 16-yard pass from Aidan Dunne, Caden Palmer kick (Drive: 6 plays, 63 yards, 3:49; YSU 14–7)

Third quarter

- (11:05) UNI – Layne Pryor 6-yard pass from Aidan Dunne, Caden Palmer kick (Drive: 6 plays, 63 yards, 3:49; Tied 14–14)
- (5:23) UNI – Tye Edwards 29-yard pass from Aidan Dunne, Caden Palmer kick (Drive: 1 play, 29 yards, 0:10; UNI 21–14)

Fourth quarter

- (8:02) YSU – Cyrus Traugh 22-yard pass from Beau Brungard, Andrew Lastovka kick (Drive: 13 plays, 75 yards, 7:31; Tied 21–21)
- (5:03) YSU – Andrew Lastovka 51-yard field goal (Drive: 5 plays, 26 yards, 1:23; YSU 24–21)
- (4:50) UNI – Sergio Morancy 97-yard kickoff return, Caden Palmer kick (UNI 28–24)
- (1:18) YSU – Max Tomczak 12-yard pass from Beau Brungard, Andrew Lastovka kick (Drive: 8 plays, 65 yards, 3:22; YSU 31–28)
- (0:02) UNI – Caden Palmer 32-yard field goal (Drive: 9 plays, 57 yards, 1:12; Tied 31-31)

Overtime

- UNI – Tye Edwards 7-yard run, Caden Palmer kick (Drive: 3 plays, 25 yards; UNI 38–31)
- YSU – Tyshon King 9-yard run, Beau Brungard pass to Austin Bray for two-point conversion (Drive: 6 plays, 25 yards; YSU 39–38)

Statistics	UNI	YSU
First downs	14	25
Total yards	308	402
Rushing yards	111	146
Passing yards	197	256
Passing: Comp–Att–Int	16–26–0	31–36–0
Time of possession	22:14	37:46

Team	Category	Player	Statistics
Northern Iowa	Passing	Aidan Dunne	16/26, 197 yards, 3 TD
Northern Iowa	Rushing	Tye Edwards	12 carries, 60 yards, TD
Northern Iowa	Receiving	Desmond Hutson	7 receptions, 101 yards, TD
Youngstown State	Passing	Beau Brungard	31/36, 256 yards, 2 TD
Youngstown State	Rushing	Beau Brungard	16 carries, 78 yards, 2 TD
Youngstown State	Receiving	Max Tomczak	10 receptions, 87 yards, TD
