= Xavier Loyd =

American football player (born 2003)

Profile
- Position: Wide receiver

Personal information
- Born: March 11, 2003 (age 23); Overland Park, Kansas, U.S.
- Listed height: 6 ft 2 in (1.88 m)
- Listed weight: 196 lb (89 kg)

Career information
- High school: Blue Springs (Blue Springs, Missouri)
- College: Kansas State (2021–2023); Illinois State (2024); Missouri (2025)
- NFL draft: 2026: undrafted

Career history
- Kansas City Chiefs (2026)*
- * Offseason or practice squad member only

Xavier Loyd (born March 11, 2003) is an American professional football wide receiver. Loyd signed with the Kansas City Chiefs as an undrafted free agent following the 2026 NFL Draft. He played college football for the Kansas State Wildcats, the Illinois State Redbirds and the Missouri Tigers.

== Early life ==
Loyd was born on March 11, 2003 in Overland Park, Kansas and grew up in Blue Springs, Missouri as one of three children to Mona James and Kalvin Loyd. By his senior year at Blue Springs High School, Loyd was a two-sport athlete already standing 6 ft 3 in (1.91 m) and weighing 180 pounds (82 kg). He played basketball and football. In football, Loyd played wide receiver with the Wildcats team. His 40 catches for 556 yards and nine touchdowns were rewarded with First Team All-Conference and All-District honors.

== College career ==
=== Kansas State ===
Loyd first enrolled at Kansas State University where he majored in kinesiology. After redshirting the 2021 season Loyd was assigned to the Wildcats reserve for the 2022 season. He made his season debut in 2023, playing eight games after which he finished the season with one catch pass for 16 yards.

=== Illinois State ===
Loyd transferred to Illinois State University and joined the Redbirds for the 2024 season. During the 2024 season, Loyd played starting wide receiver in all 14 games. With a season total of 66 receptions, Loyd ranked among the league's top seven in yards, touchdowns, and receptions.

=== Missouri ===
For his senior season, Loyd transferred to the University of Missouri. He played in all 13 games during the 2025 season including one game as starting receiver for the Tigers. While at Missouri, Loyd majored in general studies.

== Professional career ==
Pre-draft measurables
Height	Weight	Arm length	Hand span	Wingspan	40-yard dash	10-yard split	20-yard split	20-yard shuttle	Three-cone drill	Vertical jump	Broad jump	Bench press
6 ft 1 1/2 in (1.87 m)	196 lb (89 kg)	32 in (0.81 m)	9 in (0.23 m)	6 ft 6 5/8 in (2.00 m)	4.53 s	1.66 s	2.64 s	4.47 s	7.30 s	38.5 in (0.98 m)	10 ft 7 in (3.23 m)	4 reps
All values from Pro Day

=== Kansas City Chiefs ===
On May 5, 2026, Loyd signed with the Kansas City Chiefs as an undrafted free agent following the 2026 NFL draft. He and Nick Bolton were two of three recruits signed after completing successful minicamp tryouts. On August 30, Loyd was waived by the Chiefs as a part of final roster cuts.
