= Hancock Stadium =

Stadium in Illinois, USA

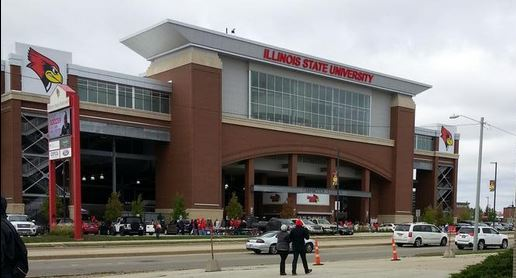
- Interactive map of Hancock Stadium
- Location: N Main St & W Locust St; Normal, IL 61761
- Coordinates: 40°30′43″N 88°59′48″W
- Owner: Illinois State University
- Operator: Illinois State University
- Capacity: 13,391 (2013–present); 7,700 (2012); 9,500 (2011); 11,500 (2010); 14,000 (2008–2009); 15,000 (1977–2007); 18,000 (1963–1976)
- Surface: FieldTurf
- Public transit: Connect Transit

Construction
- Opened: 1963
- Renovated: 1969 (added turf), 2013
- Cost: $20 million (renovations)
- Architect: BDMD Architects (renovations)

Website
- Illinois State athletic facilities page

Hancock Stadium is a 13,391-seat multi-purpose stadium in Normal, Illinois. It opened in 1963. It is home to the Illinois State University Redbirds football team as well as University High School. Central Catholic High School also played its games there through the 2004 season.

== History ==
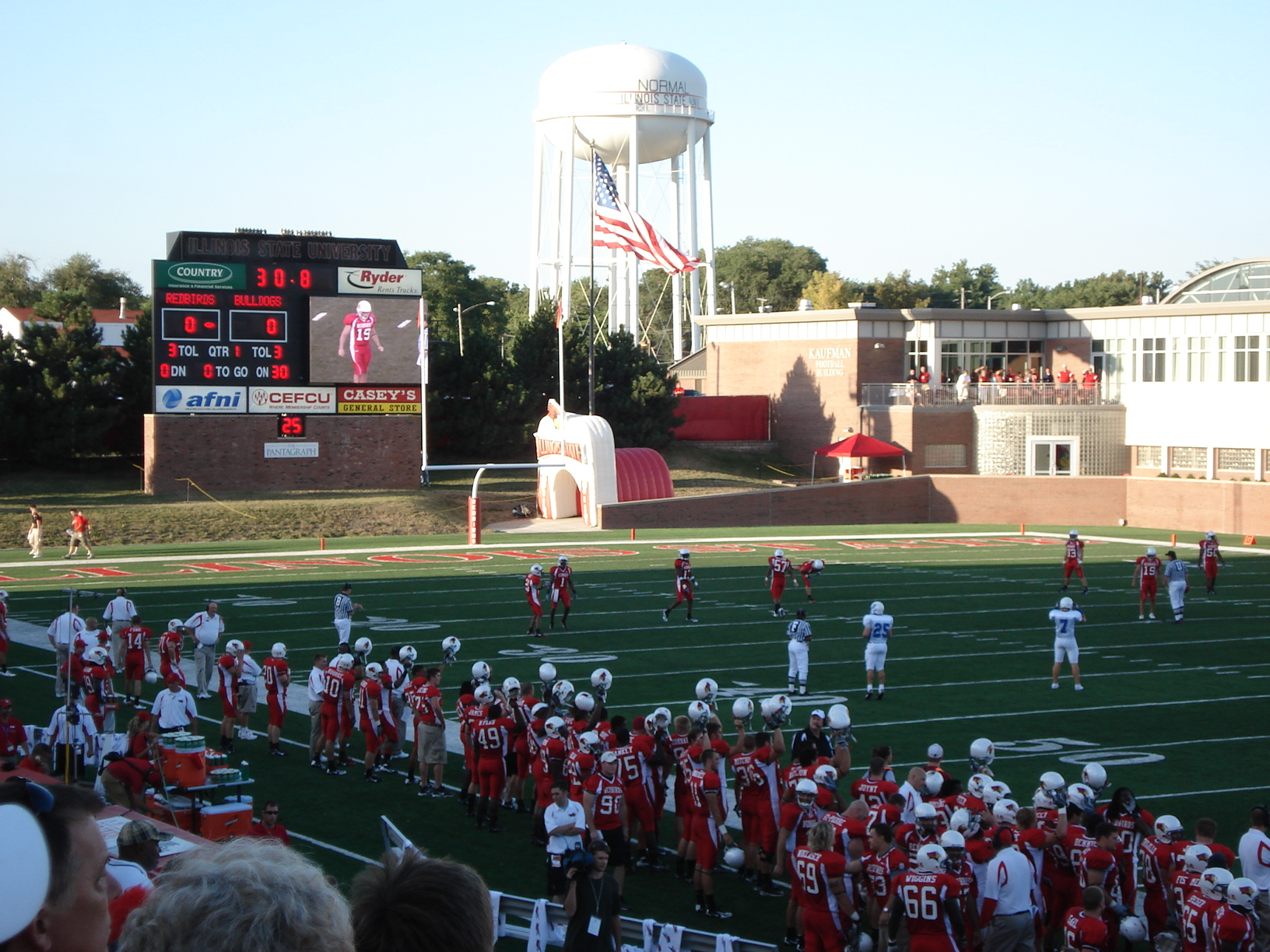
ISU vs. Drake at Hancock Stadium

Opened in 1963 and named after Illinois State's former athletic director Dr. Howard Hancock. In 1969, Hancock Stadium became Illinois' first college stadium that featured artificial turf as its playing surface. The artificial turf was replaced in 2010 and a new scoreboard was installed.

For many years, Hancock Stadium was the home of the Illinois High School football championships. The games moved in 1999. After new bids took place in 2022, Hancock Stadium is hosting the Illinois High School State Football Championships from 2023-2028.

== Renovation ==
In 2000 the Kaufman Football Building was opened. This facility is now the home to the players and coaches. In recent years, Redbird football has enjoyed a resurgence of spirit and success, all bringing attention to the ailing facility. Under the leadership of athletic director (Gary Friedman) and university president (Dr. Al Bowman), plans detailing the Hancock Stadium Stadium renovations were unveiled in 2013.

The plans boast upgrades to the design of the new east-side grandstand, bleacher-back seating on the new east-side grandstand, concourse, new concession and restroom facilities, premium seating options, including 500+ chairback club seats, 5,500 sq. ft, indoor club accessible to club seat holders and 7 suites, press level above the indoor club, Redbird Team Store, where fans can purchase ISU gear, a new ticket office, and a new sound system and scoreboard (if funding allows). Newly renovated Hancock Stadium's capacity is 13,391 The estimated cost of the Hancock Stadium renovation is $20 million.

In the summer of 2011, the south bleachers of the stadium were removed to potentially start the first phase of renovations. Also fiberglass bleachers are a thing of the past, as new metal bleachers were installed on the west side of Hancock Stadium in August 2011.

== Future Plans ==
The design of the new east-side grandstand takes into account possible future growth and expansion.

== See also ==
- List of NCAA Division I FCS football stadiums
