= Daniel Sobkowicz =

American football player (born 2002)

Profile
- Position: Wide receiver

Personal information
- Born: September 16, 2002 (age 24); Arlington Heights, Illinois, U.S.
- Listed height: 6 ft 2 in (1.88 m)
- Listed weight: 193 lb (88 kg)

Career information
- High school: Rolling Meadows (Rolling Meadows, Illinois)
- College: Illinois State (2021–2025)
- NFL draft: 2026: undrafted

Career history
- Houston Texans (2026)*
- * Offseason or practice squad member only

Awards and highlights
- First-team All-MVFC (2025); 2× Second-team All-MVFC (2023, 2024)
- Stats at Pro Football Reference

Daniel Sobkowicz (born September 16, 2002) is an American professional football wide receiver. He played college football for the Illinois State Redbirds.

== Early life ==
Sobkowicz grew up in Arlington Heights, Illinois and attended Rolling Meadows High School.

== College career ==
Sobkowicz redshirted his true freshman season. He had 31 catches for 377 yards and three touchdowns during his redshirt freshman season. Sobkowicz was named second-team All-Missouri Valley Football Conference (MVFC) as a sophomore after catching 68 passes for 933 yards and ten touchdowns. He repeated as a second-team All-MVFC selection after finishing his redshirt junior season with 80 receptions for 1,108 yards and nine touchdowns. Sobkowicz was named first-team All-MVFC as a senior after finishing the season with 83 receptions for 1,141 yards and a school record 19 touchdown receptions.

== Professional career ==
Pre-draft measurables
Height	Weight	Arm length	Hand span	Wingspan	40-yard dash	10-yard split	20-yard split	20-yard shuttle	Three-cone drill	Vertical jump	Broad jump
6 ft 2 3/8 in (1.89 m)	193 lb (88 kg)	31 1/8 in (0.79 m)	9 1/8 in (0.23 m)	6 ft 5 1/8 in (1.96 m)	4.63 s	1.53 s	2.56 s	4.09 s	6.61 s	37.5 in (0.95 m)	10 ft 1 in (3.07 m)
All values from Pro Day

On May 8, 2026, Sobkowicz signed with the Houston Texans as an undrafted free agent. Sobkowicz was waived by the Texans on August 30 as a part of final roster cuts; he was re-signed to the team's practice squad the following day. He was released by Houston on October 13, but was re-signed on November 4. He was released on November 14.
