= 2024 Missouri State Bears football team =

American college football season

2024 Missouri State Bears football
- Conference: Missouri Valley Football Conference

Ranking
- FCS Coaches: No. 21
- Record: 8–4 (6–2 MVFC)
- Head coach: Ryan Beard (2nd season)
- Offensive coordinator: Nick Petrino (5th season)
- Offensive scheme: Multiple
- Defensive coordinator: L. D. Scott (2nd season)
- Base defense: 4–2–5
- Captains: Grant Burkett; Darion Smith; Jacardia Wright; Jacob Clark; Tahj Chambers
- Home stadium: Robert W. Plaster Stadium

2024 Missouri Valley Football Conference standings
	Conf.			Overall
Team	W		L	W		L
No. 1 North Dakota State +^	7	–	1	14	–	2
No. 3 South Dakota State +^	7	–	1	12	–	3
No. 4 South Dakota +^	7	–	1	11	–	3
Missouri State *	6	–	2	8	–	4
No. 11 Illinois State ^	6	–	2	10	–	4
Youngstown State	3	–	5	4	–	8
Indiana State	3	–	5	4	–	8
North Dakota	2	–	6	5	–	7
Southern Illinois	2	–	6	4	–	8
Northern Iowa	1	–	7	3	–	9
Murray State	0	–	8	1	–	11
+ – Conference co-champions; ^ – FCS playoff participant; * – Ineligible for 2024 FCS playoffs due to transition to the FBS; Rankings from STATS Poll

The 2024 Missouri State Bears football team represented Missouri State University as a member of the Missouri Valley Football Conference (MVFC) during the 2024 NCAA Division I FCS football season. Led by first-year head coach Ryan Beard, the Bears compiled an overall record of 8–4 with a mark of 6–2 in conference play, tying for fourth place in the MVFC. Because they were set join Conference USA of the NCAA Division I Football Bowl Subdivision (FBS) the following season, the Bears were not eligible for the NCAA Division I playoffs nor the MVFC title. Missouri State played home games at Robert W. Plaster Stadium in Springfield, Missouri.

== Schedule ==
Date	Time	Opponent	Site	TV	Result	Attendance
August 31	8:00 p.m.	at No. 3 Montana*	Washington–Grizzly Stadium; Missoula, MT	ESPN+	L 24–29	26,482
September 7	1:00 p.m.	at Ball State*	Scheumann Stadium; Muncie, IN	ESPN+	L 34–42	10,018
September 14	6:00 p.m.	Lindenwood*	Robert W. Plaster Stadium; Springfield, MO	ESPN+	W 28–14	9,642
September 21	6:00 p.m.	at UT Martin*	Graham Stadium; Martin, TN	ESPN+	W 31–24	3,985
September 28	2:00 p.m.	Youngstown State	Robert W. Plaster Stadium; Springfield, MO	ESPN+	W 38–31	12,117
October 12	12:00 p.m.	at No. 16 Illinois State	Hancock Stadium; Normal, IL	ESPN+	W 41–7	6,232
October 19	2:00 p.m.	Indiana State^{†}	Robert W. Plaster Stadium; Springfield, MO	ESPN+	W 46–21	11,280
October 26	4:00 p.m.	at Northern Iowa	UNI-Dome; Cedar Falls, IA	ESPN+	W 49–42	10,848
November 2	2:00 p.m.	Southern Illinois	Robert W. Plaster Stadium; Springfield, MO	ESPN+	W 38–17	8,134
November 9	1:00 p.m.	at Murray State	Roy Stewart Stadium; Murray, KY	ESPN+	W 59–31	5,127
November 16	2:30 p.m.	at No. 1 North Dakota State	Fargodome; Fargo, ND	ESPN+	L 21–59	14,679
November 23	2:00 p.m.	No. 3 South Dakota State	Robert W. Plaster Stadium; Springfield, MO	ESPN+	L 9–45	7,142
*Non-conference game; ^{†}Homecoming; Rankings from STATS Poll released prior to the game; All times are in Central time

== Preseason ==
=== MVFC poll ===
The MVFC released its preseason prediction poll on July 22, 2024. The Bears were predicted to finish ninth in the conference.

== Game summaries ==
=== at No. 3 Montana ===
Game One – Missouri State Bears (0–0) at No. 3 Montana Grizzlies (0–0) – Game summary

Quarter	1	2	3	4	Total
Bears	7	3	7	7	24
No. 3 Grizzlies	6	6	7	10	29

at Washington-Grizzly Stadium, Missoula, MT

- Date: Saturday August 31, 2024
- Game time: 8:00 p.m. CDT
- Game attendance: 26,482
- TV announcers (ESPN+): Jay Kohn (play-by-play), Marty Mornhinweg (analyst) and Kyle Hansen (sideline)

Statistics	MOST	MONT
First downs	22	23
Total yards	356	347
Rushing yards	99	167
Passing yards	257	180
Turnovers	1	1
Time of possession	36:37	23:23

Team	Category	Player	Statistics
Missouri State	Passing	Jacob Clark	23/39, 257 yards, INT
Missouri State	Rushing	Jacardia Wright	19 carries, 76 yards, TD
Missouri State	Receiving	Hunter Wood	6 receptions, 70 yards
Montana	Passing	Logan Fife	5/7, 90 yards, TD
Montana	Rushing	Eli Gillman	15 carries, 89 yards, 2 TD
Montana	Receiving	Xavier Harris	3 receptions, 69 yards, TD

=== at Ball State ===
Game Two – Missouri State Bears (0–1) at Ball State Cardinals (0–0) – Game summary

Quarter	1	2	3	4	Total
Bears	7	0	7	20	34
Cardinals	0	7	7	28	42

at Scheumann Stadium, Muncie, IN

- Date: Saturday September 7, 2024
- Game time: 1:00 p.m. CDT
- Game weather: Sunny, 64 °F (18 °C)
- Game attendance: 10,018
- Referee: Billy Williams
- TV announcers (ESPN+): Kelsie Kasper (play-by-play) and Ryan Cavanaugh (analyst)

Statistics	MOST	BALL
First downs	18	25
Total yards	320	435
Rushing yards	62	173
Passing yards	258	262
Passing: Comp–Att–Int	19–32–1	28–38–1
Time of possession	21:30	38:30

Team	Category	Player	Statistics
Missouri State	Passing	Jacob Clark	19/32, 258 yards, 2 TD, INT
Missouri State	Rushing	Jacardia Wright	15 carries, 46 yards, TD
Missouri State	Receiving	Jmariyae Robinson	7 receptions, 102 yards, TD
Ball State	Passing	Kadin Semonza	28/38, 262 yards, 4 TD, INT
Ball State	Rushing	Braedon Sloan	21 carries, 103 yards, TD
Ball State	Receiving	Cam Pickett	7 receptions, 69 yards

=== Lindenwood ===
Game Three – Lindenwood Lions (0–2) at Missouri State Bears (0–2) – Game summary

Quarter	1	2	3	4	Total
Lions	0	7	0	7	14
Bears	14	7	7	0	28

at Robert W. Plaster Stadium, Springfield, MO

- Date: Saturday September 14, 2024
- Game time: 6:00 PM
- Game weather: Sunny, 80 °F (27 °C)
- Game attendance: 9,642
- Referee: Jason Berg
- TV announcers (ESPN+): TBD

Game information

First quarter

- (9:32) MOST – Jmariyae Robinson 32 yard pass from Jacob Clark, Yousef Obeid kick (Drive: 6 plays, 85 yards, 3:07; MOST 7–0)
- (2:07) MOST – Lance Mason 10 yard pass from Jacob Clark, Yousef Obeid kick (Drive: 9 plays, 86 yards, 4:55; MOST 14–0)

Second quarter

- (9:21) MOST – Jacardia Wright 3 yard run, Yousef Obeid kick (Drive: 10 plays, 78 yards, 5:29; MOST 21–0)
- (5:38) LIN – Nate Glantz 1 yard run, Logan Seibert kick (Drive: 9 plays, 79 yards, 3:36; MOST 21–7)

Third quarter

- (10:04) MOST – Jacardia Wright 4 yard run, Yousef Obeid kick (Drive: 9 plays, 75 yards, 4:56; MOST 28–7)

Fourth quarter

- (1:00) LIN – Jeff Caldwell 79 yard pass from Tyler Kubat, Logan Seibert kick (Drive: 3 plays, 71 yards, 0:57; MOST 28–14)

Statistics	LIN	MOST
First downs	18	28
Total yards	328	476
Rushing yards	127	174
Passing yards	201	302
Passing: Comp–Att–Int	14–24–3	28–33–0
Time of possession	23:41	36:19

Team	Category	Player	Statistics
Lindenwood	Passing	Nate Glantz	13/22, 122 yards, 3 INT
Lindenwood	Rushing	Steve Hall	13 carries, 100 yards
Lindenwood	Receiving	Jeff Caldwell	6 receptions, 137 yards, 1 TD
Missouri State	Passing	Jacob Clark	28/33, 302 yards, 2 TD
Missouri State	Rushing	Jacardia Wright	21 carries, 143 yards, 2 TD
Missouri State	Receiving	Hunter Wood	10 receptions, 90 yards

=== at UT Martin ===
Game Four – Missouri State Bears (1–2) at UT Martin Skyhawks (1–2) – Game summary

Quarter	1	2	3	4	Total
Bears	0	10	14	7	31
Skyhawks	7	0	7	10	24

at Graham Stadium, Martin, TN

- Date: Saturday September 21, 2024
- Game time: 6:00 p.m. CDT
- Game weather: Cloudy, 84 °F (29 °C)
- Game attendance: 3,985
- Referee: Brad Carrell
- TV announcers (ESPN+): Davis Gregory (play-by-play), John Hatler (analyst) and Chris Brinkley (sideline)

Game information

First quarter

- (6:28) UTM – Max Dowling 9 yard pass from Kaiya Sheron, Jaren Van Winkle kick (Drive: 5 plays, 65 yards, 3:01; UTM 7–0)

Second quarter

- (11:01) MOST – Yousef Obeid 33 yard field goal (Drive: 7 plays, 30 yards, 3:06; UTM 7–3)
- (0:05) MOST – Hunter Wood 1 yard pass from Jacob Clark, Yousef Obeid kick (Drive: 7 plays, 90 yards, 0:48; MOST 10–7)

Third quarter

- (11:21) MOST – Jacardia Wright 5 yard run, Yousef Obeid kick (Drive: 8 plays, 75 yards, 3:39; MOST 17–7)
- (7:51) MOST – DVontae Key 35 yard pass from Jacob Clark, Yousef Obeid kick (Drive: 1 plays, 35 yards, 0:09; MOST 24–7)
- (3:38) UTM – Patrick Smith 8 yard run, Jaren Van Winkle kick (Drive: 8 plays, 75 yards, 4:13; MOST 24–14)

Fourth quarter

- (12:50) MOST – Connor Lair 3 yard pass from Jacob Clark, Yousef Obeid kick (Drive: 5 plays, 18 yards, 1:53; MOST 31–14)
- (7:20) UTM – Tyler Dostin 12 yard pass from Kaiya Sheron, Jaren Van Winkle kick (Drive: 10 plays, 75 yards, 5:30; MOST 31–21)
- (2:24) UTM – Jaren Van Winkle 31 yard field goal (Drive: 9 plays, 44 yards, 2:13; MOST 31–24)

Statistics	MOST	UTM
First downs	19	19
Total yards	403	308
Rushing yards	15	95
Passing yards	388	213
Turnovers	0	2
Time of possession	30:06	29:54

Team	Category	Player	Statistics
Missouri State	Passing	Jacob Clark	26/33, 388 yards, 3 TD
Missouri State	Rushing	Jacardia Wright	16 carries, 22 yards, 1 TD
Missouri State	Receiving	Lance Mason	3 receptions, 94 yards
UT Martin	Passing	Kaiya Sheron	20/27, 213 yards, 2 TD
UT Martin	Rushing	Patrick Smith	16 carries, 63 yards, 1 TD
UT Martin	Receiving	Trevonte Rucker	6 receptions, 73 yards

=== Youngstown State ===
Game Five – Youngstown State Penguins (1–3) at Missouri State Bears (2–2) – Game summary

Quarter	1	2	3	4	Total
Penguins	7	7	3	14	31
Bears	7	17	0	14	38

at Robert W. Plaster Stadium, Springfield, MO

- Date: Saturday September 28, 2024
- Game time: 2:00 PM
- Game weather: Cloudy • Temperature: 75 °F (24 °C) • Wind: N at 14 miles per hour (23 km/h)
- Game attendance: 12,117
- Referee: Gregory Gompf
- TV announcers (ESPN+): Scott Warmann (play-by-play) and Don Patterson (analyst)

Game information

First quarter

- (6:38) YSU – Beau Brungard 9-yard run, Andrew Lastovka kick (Drive: 15 plays, 75 yards, 8:22; YSU 7–0)
- (3:54) MOST – Jacardia Wright 27-yard run, Yousef Obeid kick (Drive: 5 plays, 65 yards, 2:44; Tied 7–7)

Second quarter

- (9:02) MOST – Jayden Becks 57-yard pass from Jacob Clark, Yousef Obeid kick (Drive: 2 plays, 95 yards, 0:51; MOST 14–7)
- (3:59) YSU – Tyshon King 8-yard run, Andrew Lastovka kick (Drive: 9 plays, 76 yards, 4:57; Tied 14–14)
- (1:42) MOST – Lance Mason 30-yard pass from Jacob Clark, Yousef Obeid kick (Drive: 6 plays, 75 yards, 2:17; MOST 21–14)
- (0:00) MOST – Yousef Obeid 19-yard field goal (Drive: 6 plays, 63 yards, 0:46; MOST 24–14)

Third quarter

- (4:02) YSU – Andrew Lastovka 38-yard field goal (Drive: 11 plays, 41 yards, 5:44; MOST 24–17)

Fourth quarter

- (14:56) MOST – Jmariyae Robinson 4-yard run, Yousef Obeid kick (Drive: 8 plays, 74 yards, 3:58; MOST 31–17)
- (9:20) YSU – Ethan Wright 3-yard run, Andrew Lastovka kick (Drive: 11 plays, 76 yards, 5:31; MOST 31–24)
- (5:46) YSU – Beau Brungard 44-yard run, Andrew Lastovka kick (Drive: 5 plays, 76 yards, 2:12; Tied 31–31)
- (0:08) MOST – Lance Mason 5-yard pass from Jacob Clark, Yousef Obeid kick (Drive: 5 plays, 53 yards, 0:54; MOST 38–31)

Statistics	YSU	MOST
First downs	25	20
Total yards	424	464
Rushing yards	244	139
Passing yards	180	325
Passing: Comp–Att–Int	18–31–1	21–30–0
Time of possession	40:37	19:23

Team	Category	Player	Statistics
Youngstown State	Passing	Beau Brungard	18/31, 180 yards, INT
Youngstown State	Rushing	Beau Brungard	16 carries, 110 yards, 2 TD
Youngstown State	Receiving	Max Tomczak	4 receptions, 59 yards
Missouri State	Passing	Jacob Clark	21/29, 325 yards, 3 TD
Missouri State	Rushing	Jacob Clark	7 carries, 63 yards
Missouri State	Receiving	Jmariyae Robinson	3 receptions, 104 yards

=== at No. 16 Illinois State ===
Game Six – Missouri State Bears (3–2) vs No. 16 Illinois State Redbirds (4–2) – Game summary

Quarter	1	2	3	4	Total
Bears	0	0	0	0	0
No. 16 Redbirds	0	0	0	0	0

at Hancock Stadium • Normal, IL

- Date: Saturday October 12, 2024
- Game time: 12:00 p.m.
- Game weather: 0 °F (−18 °C)
- TV: ESPN+

Game information

First quarter
Second quarter
Third quarter
Fourth quarter

Statistics	MOST	ILST
First downs		
Total yards		
Rushing yards		
Passing yards		
Passing: Comp–Att–Int		
Time of possession		

Team	Category	Player	Statistics
Missouri State	Passing		
Missouri State	Rushing		
Missouri State	Receiving		
Illinois State	Passing		
Illinois State	Rushing		
Illinois State	Receiving		

=== Indiana State ===
Game Seven – Indiana State Sycamores (2–4) at Missouri State Bears (4–2) – Game summary

Quarter	1	2	3	4	Total
Sycamores	0	0	0	0	0
Bears	0	0	0	0	0

at Robert W. Plaster Stadium, Springfield, MO

- Date: Saturday October 19, 2024
- Game time: 2:00 PM
- TV announcers (ESPN+): TBD

Game information

First quarter
Second quarter
Third quarter
Fourth quarter

Statistics	INST	MOST
First downs		
Total yards		
Rushing yards		
Passing yards		
Passing: Comp–Att–Int		
Time of possession		

Team	Category	Player	Statistics
Indiana State	Passing		
Indiana State	Rushing		
Indiana State	Receiving		
Missouri State	Passing		
Missouri State	Rushing		
Missouri State	Receiving		

=== at Northern Iowa ===
Game Eight – Missouri State Bears (5–2) vs Northern Iowa Panthers (2–5) – Game summary

Quarter	1	2	3	4	Total
Bears	0	0	0	0	0
Panthers	0	0	0	0	0

at UNI-Dome • Cedar Falls, IA

- Date: Saturday October 26, 2024
- Game time: 4:00 p.m.
- Game weather: 0 °F (−18 °C)
- TV: ESPN+

Game information

First quarter
Second quarter
Third quarter
Fourth quarter

Statistics	MOST	UNI
First downs		
Total yards		
Rushing yards		
Passing yards		
Passing: Comp–Att–Int		
Time of possession		

Team	Category	Player	Statistics
Missouri State	Passing		
Missouri State	Rushing		
Missouri State	Receiving		
Northern Iowa	Passing		
Northern Iowa	Rushing		
Northern Iowa	Receiving		

=== Southern Illinois ===
Game Nine – Southern Illinois Salukis (2–6) at Missouri State Bears (6–2) – Game summary

Quarter	1	2	3	4	Total
Salukis	0	0	0	0	0
Bears	0	0	0	0	0

at Robert W. Plaster Stadium, Springfield, MO

- Date: Saturday November 2, 2024
- Game time: 2:00 PM
- TV announcers (ESPN+): TBD

Game information

First quarter
Second quarter
Third quarter
Fourth quarter

Statistics	SIU	MOST
First downs		
Total yards		
Rushing yards		
Passing yards		
Passing: Comp–Att–Int		
Time of possession		

Team	Category	Player	Statistics
Southern Illinois	Passing		
Southern Illinois	Rushing		
Southern Illinois	Receiving		
Missouri State	Passing		
Missouri State	Rushing		
Missouri State	Receiving		

=== at Murray State ===
Game Ten – Missouri State Bears (7–2) vs Murray State Racers (1–8) – Game summary

Quarter	1	2	3	4	Total
Bears	0	0	0	0	0
Racers	0	0	0	0	0

at Roy Stewart Stadium • Murray, KY

- Date: Saturday November 9, 2024
- Game time: 1:00 p.m.
- Game weather: 0 °F (−18 °C)
- TV: ESPN+

Game information

First quarter
Second quarter
Third quarter
Fourth quarter

Statistics	MOST	MURR
First downs		
Total yards		
Rushing yards		
Passing yards		
Passing: Comp–Att–Int		
Time of possession		

Team	Category	Player	Statistics
Missouri State	Passing		
Missouri State	Rushing		
Missouri State	Receiving		
Murray State	Passing		
Murray State	Rushing		
Murray State	Receiving		

=== at No. 1 North Dakota State ===
Game Eleven – Missouri State Bears (8–2) vs No. 1 North Dakota State Bison (9–1) – Game summary

Quarter	1	2	3	4	Total
Bears	0	14	0	7	21
No. 1 Bison	21	14	14	10	59

at Fargodome • Fargo, ND

- Date: Saturday November 16, 2024
- Game time: 2:30 p.m.
- Game weather: Indoors; 70 °F (21 °C)
- Game attendance: 14,679
- Referee: Jason Perkins
- TV: ESPN+

Game information

First quarter

- (13:14) NDSU – Barika Kpeenu 52-yard run, Griffin Crosa kick (Drive: 2 plays, 52 yards, 0:19; North Dakota State 7–0)
- (10:48) NDSU – Joe Stoffel 3-yard pass from Cam Miller, Griffin Crosa kick (Drive: 5 plays, 13 yards, 2:12; North Dakota State 14–0)
- (1:32) NDSU – Jackson Williams 22-yard pass from Cam Miller, Griffin Crosa kick (Drive: 12 plays, 95 yards, 7:09; North Dakota State 21–0)

Second quarter

- (8:16) NDSU – Bryce Lance 4-yard pass from Cam Miller, Griffin Crosa kick (Drive: 9 plays, 80 yards, 4:09; North Dakota State 28–0)
- (2:48) MOST – Jacardia Wright 1-yard run, Yousef Obeid kick (Drive: 10 plays, 78 yards, 5:22; North Dakota State 28–7)
- (1:44) MOST – Jayden Becks 40-yard pass from Hunter Wood, Yousef Obeid kick (Drive: 1 play, 40 yards, 0:09; North Dakota State 28–14)
- (0:08) NDSU – Joe Stoffel 1-yard pass from Cam Miller, Griffin Crosa kick (Drive: 11 plays, 65 yards, 1:36; North Dakota State 35–14)

Third quarter

- (13:03) NDSU – CharMar Brown 48-yard run, Griffin Crosa kick (Drive: 4 plays, 75 yards, 1:57; North Dakota State 42–14)
- (2:36) NDSU – Barika Kpeenu 49-yard run, Griffin Crosa kick (Drive: 7 plays, 85 yards, 4:03; North Dakota State 49–14)

Fourth quarter

- (13:44) MOST – Jmariyae Robinson 2-yard pass from Jacob Clark, Yousef Obeid kick (Drive: 13 plays, 75 yards, 3:46; North Dakota State 49–21)
- (11:16) NDSU – Griffin Crosa 32-yard field goal (Drive: 8 plays, 58 yards, 2:28; North Dakota State 52–21)
- (7:47) NDSU – John Gores 27-yard pass from Nathan Hayes, Griffin Crosa kick (Drive: 3 plays, 31 yards, 1:28; North Dakota State 59–21)

Statistics	MOST	NDSU
First downs	22	27
Total yards	382	575
Rushing yards	86	364
Passing yards	296	211
Passing: Comp–Att–Int	20–32–0	19–27–1
Time of possession	31:21	28:39

Team	Category	Player	Statistics
Missouri State	Passing	Jacob Clark	18/30, 247 yards, TD
Missouri State	Rushing	Jacardia Wright	13 carries, 68 yards, TD
Missouri State	Receiving	Hunter Wood	4 receptions, 73 yards
North Dakota State	Passing	Cam Miller	17/24, 155 yards, 4 TD, INT
North Dakota State	Rushing	Barika Kpeenu	10 carries, 169 yards, 2 TD
North Dakota State	Receiving	Chris Harris	3 receptions, 48 yards

=== No. 3 South Dakota State ===
Game Twelve – No. 3 South Dakota State Jackrabbits (9–2) at Missouri State Bears (8–3) – Game summary

Quarter	1	2	3	4	Total
No. 3 Jackrabbits	7	17	14	7	45
Bears	0	9	0	0	9

at Robert W. Plaster Stadium, Springfield, MO

- Date: Saturday November 23, 2024
- Game time: 2:00 PM
- Game weather: 59 °F (15 °C), Sunny, Wind S 7 mph (11 km/h)
- Game attendance: 7,142
- Referee: John Shay
- TV announcers (ESPN+): TBD

Game information

First quarter
Second quarter
Third quarter
Fourth quarter

Statistics	SDST	MOST
First downs		
Total yards		
Rushing yards		
Passing yards		
Passing: Comp–Att–Int		
Time of possession		

Team	Category	Player	Statistics
South Dakota State	Passing		
South Dakota State	Rushing		
South Dakota State	Receiving		
Missouri State	Passing		
Missouri State	Rushing		
Missouri State	Receiving		
