= 2024 Northern Iowa Panthers football team =

American college football season

2024 Northern Iowa Panthers football
- Conference: Missouri Valley Football Conference
- Record: 3–9 (1–7 MVFC)
- Head coach: Mark Farley (24th season)
- Home stadium: UNI-Dome

2024 Missouri Valley Football Conference standings
	Conf.			Overall
Team	W		L	W		L
No. 1 North Dakota State +^	7	–	1	14	–	2
No. 3 South Dakota State +^	7	–	1	12	–	3
No. 4 South Dakota +^	7	–	1	11	–	3
Missouri State *	6	–	2	8	–	4
No. 11 Illinois State ^	6	–	2	10	–	4
Youngstown State	3	–	5	4	–	8
Indiana State	3	–	5	4	–	8
North Dakota	2	–	6	5	–	7
Southern Illinois	2	–	6	4	–	8
Northern Iowa	1	–	7	3	–	9
Murray State	0	–	8	1	–	11
+ – Conference co-champions; ^ – FCS playoff participant; * – Ineligible for 2024 FCS playoffs due to transition to the FBS; Rankings from STATS Poll

The 2024 Northern Iowa Panthers football team was an American college football team that represented the University of Northern Iowa as a member of the Missouri Valley Football Conference (MVFC) during the 2024 NCAA Division I FCS football season. In its 24th and final year under head coach Mark Farley, the team compiled a 3–9 record (1–7 in conference games), was outscored by a total of 396 to 238, and finished in tenth place out of eleven teams in the MVFC. The team set program records with nine consecutive losses and played before the largest crowd in program history (86,546) in a 34–3 loss to Nebraska on September 14 at Lincoln, Nebraska.

Senior wide receiver and return specialist Sergio Morancy was selected as a first-team player on the 2024 all-MVFC football team. Senior offensive lineman Jared Penning was named to the second team. Morancy led the team with 543 receiving yards, returned both a kickoff and a punt for a touchdown, and tied program records with 24 points scored and four touchdowns against Indiana State. The team's other statistical leaders included quarterback Matthew Schecklman (1,276 passing yards), running back Tye Edwards (1,047 rushing yards), and kicker Caden Palmer (60 points scored).

Farley announced on November 10 that he intended to retire at the conclusion of the 2024 season. He first joined Northern Iowa as a walk-on linebacker in 1982 and, in 24 years as head coach, led the Panthers to seven MVFC championships and became the winningest coach in MVFC history.

The team played its home games at the UNI-Dome in Cedar Falls, Iowa.

== Schedule ==
Date	Time	Opponent	Rank	Site	TV	Result	Attendance
August 31	4:00 p.m.	Valparaiso*		UNI-Dome; Cedar Falls, IA	ESPN+	W 35–7	8,458
September 7	1:00 p.m.	at St. Thomas*		O'Shaughnessy Stadium; Saint Paul, MN	Midco Sports+	W 17–10	3,946
September 14	6:30 p.m.	at No. 23 (FBS) Nebraska*		Memorial Stadium; Lincoln, NE	BTN	L 3–34	86,546
September 21	11:00 p.m.	at Hawaii*	No. 25	Clarence T. C. Ching Athletics Complex; Honolulu, HI	SPEC PPV	L 7–36	11,402
October 5	4:00 p.m.	No. 1 South Dakota State		UNI-Dome; Cedar Falls, IA	ESPN+	L 3–41	12,611
October 12	2:00 p.m.	at No. 4 South Dakota		DakotaDome; Vermillion, SD	ESPN+	L 17–42	8,934
October 19	1:00 p.m.	at No. 9 North Dakota		Alerus Center; Grand Forks, ND	ESPN+	L 7–31	11,617
October 26	4:00 p.m.	Missouri State^{†}		UNI-Dome; Cedar Falls, IA	ESPN+	L 42–49	10,848
November 2	2:30 p.m.	at No. 1 North Dakota State		Fargodome; Fargo, ND	ESPN+	L 19–42	14,528
November 9	1:00 p.m.	No. 18 Illinois State		UNI-Dome; Cedar Falls, IA	ESPN+	L 9–31	1,880
November 16	11:00 a.m.	at Youngstown State		Stambaugh Stadium; Youngstown, OH	ESPN+	L 38–39 ^{OT}	7,038
November 23	1:00 p.m.	Indiana State		UNI-Dome; Cedar Falls, IA	ESPN+	W 41–34	8,398
*Non-conference game; ^{†}Homecoming; Rankings from STATS Poll released prior to the game; All times are in Central time

== Game summaries ==
=== Valparaiso ===
Game One – Valparaiso Beacons (0–0) vs Northern Iowa Panthers (0–0) – Game summary

Quarter	1	2	3	4	Total
Beacons	0	7	0	0	7
Panthers	14	14	7	0	35

at UNI-Dome • Cedar Falls, IA

- Date: Saturday August 31, 2024
- Game time: 4:00 PM
- Game weather: 72 °F (22 °C) (indoor)
- Game attendance: 8,458
- Referee: David Hergert
- TV: ESPN+

Game information

First quarter

- (10:04) UNI – Layne Pryor 21-yard pass from Aidan Dunne, Caden Palmer kick (Drive: 9 plays, 79 yards, 4:48; Northern Iowa 7–0)
- (2:48) UNI – Amauri Pesek-Hickson 20-yard pass from Aidan Dunne, Caden Palmer kick (Drive: 8 plays, 75 yards, 5:05; Northern Iowa 14–0)

Second quarter

- (14:06) UNI – Tye Edwards 54-yard run, Caden Palmer kick (Drive: 3 plays, 71 yards, 1:13; Northern Iowa 21–0)
- (11:12) VAL – Mike Mansaray 1-yard run, Ryan Hawk kick (Drive: 5 plays, 75 yards, 2:54; Northern Iowa 21–7)
- (3:28) UNI – Tye Edwards 12-yard run, Caden Palmer kick (Drive: 8 plays, 64 yards, 4:02; Northern Iowa 28–7)

Third quarter

- (10:35) UNI – Sergio Morancy 5-yard pass from Aidan Dunne, Caden Palmer kick (Drive: 6 plays, 71 yards, 2:59; Northern Iowa 35–7)

Fourth quarter

No scoring

Statistics	VAL	UNI
First downs	5	29
Total yards	137	481
Rushing yards	29	365
Passing yards	108	116
Passing: Comp–Att–Int	8-19-0	12-17-0
Time of possession	18:13	41:47

Team	Category	Player	Statistics
Valparaiso	Passing	Rowan Keefe	6/16, 101 yds
Valparaiso	Rushing	Caron Tyler	2 car, 17 yds
Valparaiso	Receiving	Mike Mansaray	3 rec, 79 yds
Northern Iowa	Passing	Aidan Dunne	12/17, 116 yds, 3 TDs
Northern Iowa	Rushing	Tye Edwards	15 car, 177 yds, 2 TDs
Northern Iowa	Receiving	Layne Pryor	3 rec, 44 yds, 1 TD

=== at St. Thomas (MN) ===
Game Two – Northern Iowa Panthers (1–0) vs St. Thomas Tommies (0–1) – Game summary

Quarter	1	2	3	4	Total
Panthers	0	7	0	10	17
Tommies	7	0	3	0	10

at O'Shaughnessy Stadium • Saint Paul, MN

- Date: Saturday September 7, 2024
- Game time: 1:00 PM
- Game weather: Sunny • Temperature: 69 °F (21 °C) • Wind: NE
- Game attendance: 3,946
- Referee: Joe Smith
- TV: Midco Sports+

Game information

First quarter

- (6:50) STM – Patrick Wagner 13-yard pass from Michael Rostberg, Stephen Shagen kick (Drive: 9 plays, 80 yards, 4:26; St. Thomas 7–0)

Second quarter

- (13:03) UNI – Amauri Pesek-Hickson 3-yard run, Caden Palmer kick (Drive: 11 plays, 80 yards, 5:11; Tied 7–7)

Third quarter

- (3:53) UST – Stephen Shagen 50-yard field goal (Drive: 12 plays, 47 yards, 7:52; St. Thomas 10–7)

Fourth quarter

- (10:49) UNI – Caden Palmer 19-yard field goal (Drive: 4 plays, 5 yards, 1:21; Tied 10–10)
- (2:57) UNI – Amauri Pesek-Hickson 15-yard run, Caden Palmer kick (Drive: 6 plays, 90 yards, 3:46; Northern Iowa 17–10)

Statistics	UNI	STMN
First downs	16	19
Total yards	331	297
Rushing yards	232	129
Passing yards	99	168
Passing: Comp–Att–Int	11-25-0	19-29-0
Time of possession	25:00	35:00

Team	Category	Player	Statistics
Northern Iowa	Passing	Aidan Dunne	11/25, 99 yds
Northern Iowa	Rushing	Tye Edwards	14 car, 136 yds
Northern Iowa	Receiving	Sergio Morancy	4 rec, 52 yds
St. Thomas (MN)	Passing	Michael Rostberg	15/23, 104 yds, 1 TD
St. Thomas (MN)	Rushing	Hope Adebayo	20 car, 113 yds
St. Thomas (MN)	Receiving	Patrick Wagner	8 rec, 104 yds, 1 TD

=== at No. 23 (FBS) Nebraska ===
Game Three – Northern Iowa Panthers (2–0) vs No. 23 (FBS) Nebraska Cornhuskers (2–0) – Game summary

Quarter	1	2	3	4	Total
Panthers	3	0	0	0	3
No. 23 (FBS) Cornhuskers	7	14	6	7	34

at Memorial Stadium • Lincoln, NE

- Date: Saturday September 14, 2024
- Game time: 6:30 PM
- Game weather: 82 °F (28 °C)
- Game attendance: 86,546
- Referee: Jeffrey Servinski
- TV announcers (BTN): Guy Haberman (play-by-play), Yogi Roth (analyst), and Rhett Lewis (sideline reporter)

Game information

First quarter

- (11:40) NEB – Carter Nelson 24-yard pass from Dylan Raiola, Tristan Alvano kick (Drive: 8 plays, 75 yards, 3:20, Nebraska 7-0)
- (1:32) UNI – Caden Palmer 31-yard field goal (Drive: 16 plays, 62 yards, 10:08, Nebraska 7-3)

Second quarter

- (13:04) NEB – Isaiah Neyor 18-yard pass from Dylan Raiola, Tristan Alvano kick (Drive: 7 plays,75 yards, 3:28, Nebraska 14-3)
- (6:51) NEB – Jacory Barney Jr. 10-yard run, Tristan Alvano kick (Drive: 4 plays, 80 yards, 2:05, Nebraska 21-3)

Third quarter

- (6:17) NEB – Tristan Alvano 31-yard field goal (Drive: 9 plays, 68 yards, 3:31, Nebraska 24-3)
- (0:43) NEB - Tristan Alvano 21-yard field goal (Drive: 6 plays, 33 yards, 3:11, Nebraska 27-3)

Fourth quarter

- (4:31) NEB – Emmett Johnson 36-yard run, John Hohl kick (Drive: 8 plays, 80 yards, 4:33, Nebraska 34-3)

Statistics	UNI	NEB
First downs	18	22
Total yards	301	423
Rushing yards	139	142
Passing yards	162	281
Passing: Comp–Att–Int	16–32–1	20–26–1
Time of possession	38:07	21:53

Team	Category	Player	Statistics
Northern Iowa	Passing	Aidan Dunne	13/25, 117 yards, INT
Northern Iowa	Rushing	Aidan Dunne	11 carries, 49 yards
Northern Iowa	Receiving	Sergio Morancy	2 receptions, 30 yards
Nebraska	Passing	Dylan Raiola	17/23, 247 yards, 2 TD, INT
Nebraska	Rushing	Dante Dowdell	6 carries, 55 yards
Nebraska	Receiving	Carter Nelson	4 receptions, 48 yards, TD

=== at Hawaii ===
Game Four – No. 25 Northern Iowa Panthers (2–1) vs Hawaii Rainbow Warriors (1–2) – Game summary

Quarter	1	2	3	4	Total
No. 25 Panthers	0	7	0	0	7
Rainbow Warriors	15	7	7	7	36

at Clarence T.C. Ching Athletics Complex • Honolulu, HI

- Date: Saturday September 21, 2024
- Game time: 11:00 PM
- Game weather: Sunny, 78 °F (26 °C), NE 15 mph
- Game attendance: 11,402
- Referee: Jonathan Noli
- TV announcers (SPEC PPV): Kanoa Leahey (play-by-play), Rich Miano (analyst) and Jordan Helle (sideline)

Game information

First quarter

- HAW – Jonah Panoke 24-yard pass from Brayden Schager (Kansei Matsuzawa kick), 7:53. Rainbow Warriors 7–0. Drive: 6 plays, 69 yards, 2:58.
- HAW – Pofele Ashlock 6-yard pass from Brayden Schager (Landon Sims pass to Hunter Higham), 0:40. Rainbow Warriors 15–0. Drive: 6 plays, 75 yards, 3:32.

Second quarter

- HAW – Nick Cenacle 20-yard pass from Brayden Schager (Kansei Matsuzawa kick), 9:10. Rainbow Warriors 22–0. Drive: 7 plays, 80 yards, 3:34.
- UNI – Aidan Dunne 3-yard run (Caden Palmer kick), 4:02. Rainbow Warriors 22–7. Drive: 8 plays, 72 yards, 5:00.

Third quarter

- HAW – Nick Cenacle 1-yard pass from Brayden Schager (Kansei Matsuzawa kick), 3:21. Rainbow Warriors 29–7. Drive: 11 plays, 78 yards, 5:48.

Fourth quarter

- HAW – Landon Sims 6-yard run (Kansei Matsuzawa kick), 6:58. Rainbow Warriors 36–7. Drive: 9 plays, 74 yards, 5:07.

Statistics	UNI	HAW
First downs	13	29
Total yards	199	528
Rushing yards	72	149
Passing yards	127	379
Passing: Comp–Att–Int	17–28–0	36–44–2
Time of possession	26:58	33:02

Team	Category	Player	Statistics
Northern Iowa	Passing	Aidan Dunne	13/20, 104 yards
Northern Iowa	Rushing	Amauri Pesek-Hickson	6 carries, 43 yards
Northern Iowa	Receiving	Sergio Morancy	4 receptions, 38 yards
Hawaii	Passing	Brayden Schager	35/43, 374 yards, 4 TD, 2 INT
Hawaii	Rushing	Landon Sims	7 carries, 35 yards, TD
Hawaii	Receiving	Dekel Crowdus	3 receptions, 83 yards

=== No. 1 South Dakota State ===
Game Five – No. 1 South Dakota State Jackrabbits (3–1) vs Northern Iowa Panthers (2–2) – Game summary

Quarter	1	2	3	4	Total
No. 1 Jackrabbits	7	20	14	0	41
Panthers	0	3	0	0	3

at UNI-Dome • Cedar Falls, IA

- Date: Saturday October 5, 2024
- Game time: 4:00 p.m.
- Game weather: 0 °F (−18 °C)
- TV: ESPN+

Game information

First quarter
Second quarter
Third quarter
Fourth quarter

Statistics	SDST	UNI
First downs	17	16
Total yards	390	246
Rushing yards	139	66
Passing yards	251	180
Passing: Comp–Att–Int	19-26-	17-31-2
Time of possession	30:43	29:17

Team	Category	Player	Statistics
South Dakota State	Passing	Mark Gronowski	16-22 223 yards 3 TD
South Dakota State	Rushing	Kirby Vorhees	8 Carries 45 Yards
South Dakota State	Receiving	Angel Johnson	2 Catches 78 Yards 1 TD
Northern Iowa	Passing	Aidan Dunne	8-15 113 Yards 0 TD 2 INT
Northern Iowa	Rushing	Tye Edwards	12 Carries 62 Yards
Northern Iowa	Receiving	Sergio Morancy	6 Catches 73 Yards

=== at No. 4 South Dakota ===
Game Six – Northern Iowa Panthers (2–3) vs No. 4 South Dakota Coyotes (4–1) – Game summary

Quarter	1	2	3	4	Total
Panthers	7	3	7	0	17
No. 4 Coyotes	7	21	14	0	42

at DakotaDome • Vermillion, SD

- Date: Saturday October 12, 2024
- Game time: 2:00 p.m.
- Game weather: 0 °F (−18 °C)
- TV: ESPN+

Game information

First quarter
Second quarter
Third quarter
Fourth quarter

Statistics	UNI	SDAK
First downs	16	24
Total yards	311	513
Rushing yards	56	192
Passing yards	255	321
Passing: Comp–Att–Int	19-28-1	18-21-0
Time of possession	24:31	35:29

Team	Category	Player	Statistics
Northern Iowa	Passing	Matthew Schecklman	18-26 250 yards 1 TD 1 INT
Northern Iowa	Rushing	Tye Edwards	19 carries 53 yards 1 TD
Northern Iowa	Receiving	Desmond Hutson	4 Receptions 94 Yards
South Dakota	Passing	Aidan Bouman	17-20 284 Yards 2 TD
South Dakota	Rushing	Charles Pierre Jr	21 Carries 105 Yards 2 TD
South Dakota	Receiving	AJ Coons	2 Receptions 61 Yards 1 TD

=== at No. 9 North Dakota ===
Game Seven – Northern Iowa Panthers (2–4) vs No. 9 North Dakota Fighting Hawks (4–2) – Game summary

Quarter	1	2	3	4	Total
Panthers	0	7	0	0	7
No. 9 Fighting Hawks	7	14	0	10	31

at Alerus Center • Grand Forks, ND

- Date: Saturday October 19, 2024
- Game time: 1:00 p.m.
- Game weather: None (indoor stadium)
- TV: ESPN+

Game information

First quarter
Second quarter
Third quarter
Fourth quarter

Statistics	UNI	UND
First downs		
Total yards		
Rushing yards		
Passing yards		
Passing: Comp–Att–Int		
Time of possession		

Team	Category	Player	Statistics
Northern Iowa	Passing		
Northern Iowa	Rushing		
Northern Iowa	Receiving		
North Dakota	Passing		
North Dakota	Rushing		
North Dakota	Receiving		

=== Missouri State ===
Game Eight – Missouri State Bears (5–2) vs Northern Iowa Panthers (2–5) – Game summary

Quarter	1	2	3	4	Total
Bears	0	0	0	0	0
Panthers	0	0	0	0	0

at UNI-Dome • Cedar Falls, IA

- Date: Saturday October 26, 2024
- Game time: 4:00 p.m.
- Game weather: 0 °F (−18 °C)
- TV: ESPN+

Game information

First quarter
Second quarter
Third quarter
Fourth quarter

Statistics	MOST	UNI
First downs		
Total yards		
Rushing yards		
Passing yards		
Passing: Comp–Att–Int		
Time of possession		

Team	Category	Player	Statistics
Missouri State	Passing		
Missouri State	Rushing		
Missouri State	Receiving		
Northern Iowa	Passing		
Northern Iowa	Rushing		
Northern Iowa	Receiving		

=== at No. 1 North Dakota State ===
Game Nine – Northern Iowa Panthers (2–6) vs No. 1 North Dakota State Bison (8–1) – Game summary

Quarter	1	2	3	4	Total
Panthers	3	0	16	0	19
No. 1 Bison	14	14	7	7	42

at Fargodome • Fargo, ND

- Date: Saturday November 2, 2024
- Game time: 2:30 p.m.
- Game weather: None (indoor stadium); 70 °F (21 °C)
- Game attendance: 14,528
- Referee: Jason Berg
- TV announcers (ESPN+): Dom Izzo (play-by-play), Kyle Emanuel (analyst) and Sam Goetzinger (sideline)

Game information

First quarter

- (14:44) NDSU – TK Marshall 100-yard kickoff return, Griffin Crosa kick (North Dakota State 7–0)
- (8:44) UNI – Caden Palmer 40-yard field goal (Drive: 12 plays, 52 yards, 6:00; North Dakota State 7–3)
- (0:58) NDSU – CharMar Brown 5-yard run, Griffin Crosa kick (Drive: 13 plays, 74 yards, 7:40; North Dakota State 14–3)

Second quarter

- (6:54) NDSU – Bryce Lance 14-yard pass from Cam Miller, Griffin Crosa kick (Drive: 13 plays, 94 yards, 6:34; North Dakota State 21–3)
- (1:47) NDSU – Braylon Henderson 15-yard pass from Cam Miller, Griffin Crosa kick (Drive: 7 plays, 80 yards, 2:57; North Dakota State 28–3)

Third quarter

- (12:48) NDSU – Barika Kpeenu 6-yard run, Griffin Crosa kick (Drive: 2 plays, 48 yards, 0:40; North Dakota State 35–3)
- (9:05) UNI – Sergio Morancy 31-yard pass from Matthew Schecklman, Brady McCullough pass (Drive: 6 plays, 75 yards, 3:43; North Dakota State 35–11)
- (1:52) UNI – Sergio Morancy 9-yard pass from Matthew Schecklman, Derek Anderson pass (Drive: 9 plays, 55 yards, 4:18; North Dakota State 35–19)

Fourth quarter

- (12:59) NDSU – Barika Kpeenu 11-yard run, Griffin Crosa kick (Drive: 7 plays, 75 yards, 3:43; North Dakota State 42–19)

Statistics	UNI	NDSU
First downs	18	24
Total yards	344	422
Rushing yards	74	189
Passing yards	270	233
Passing: Comp–Att–Int	22–32–0	18–21–0
Time of possession	28:46	31:14

Team	Category	Player	Statistics
Northern Iowa	Passing	Matthew Schecklman	22/32, 270 yards, 2 TD
Northern Iowa	Rushing	Tye Edwards	12 carries, 48 yards
Northern Iowa	Receiving	Sergio Morancy	4 receptions, 102 yards, 2 TD
North Dakota State	Passing	Cam Miller	17/20, 216 yards, 2 TD
North Dakota State	Rushing	CharMar Brown	18 carries, 124 yards, TD
North Dakota State	Receiving	Bryce Lance	4 receptions, 77 yards, TD

=== No. 18 Illinois State ===
Game Ten – No. 18 Illinois State Redbirds (6–3) vs Northern Iowa Panthers (2–7) – Game summary

Quarter	1	2	3	4	Total
No. 18 Redbirds	0	0	0	0	0
Panthers	0	0	0	0	0

at UNI-Dome • Cedar Falls, IA

- Date: Saturday November 9, 2024
- Game time: 1:00 p.m.
- Game weather: 0 °F (−18 °C)
- TV: ESPN+

Game information

First quarter
Second quarter
Third quarter
Fourth quarter

Statistics	ILST	UNI
First downs		
Total yards		
Rushing yards		
Passing yards		
Passing: Comp–Att–Int		
Time of possession		

Team	Category	Player	Statistics
Illinois State	Passing		
Illinois State	Rushing		
Illinois State	Receiving		
Northern Iowa	Passing		
Northern Iowa	Rushing		
Northern Iowa	Receiving		

=== at Youngstown State ===
Game Eleven – Northern Iowa Panthers (2–8) vs Youngstown State Penguins (3–8) – Game summary

Quarter	1	2	3	4	OT	Total
Panthers	0	7	14	10	7	38
Penguins	7	7	0	17	8	39

at Stambaugh Stadium • Youngstown, OH

- Date: Saturday November 16, 2024
- Game time: 11:00 a.m.
- Game weather: Cloudy • Temperature: 50 °F (10 °C) • Windy: NW at 8 miles per hour (13 km/h)
- Game attendance: 7,038
- Referee: David Hergert
- TV announcers (ESPN+): Brad Wells (play-by-play), Don Patterson (analyst) and Kelly Burke (sideline)

Game information

First quarter

- (8:53) YSU – Beau Brungard 17-yard run, Andrew Lastovka kick (Drive: 10 plays, 75 yards, 6:07; YSU 7–0)

Second quarter

- (12:19) YSU – Beau Brungard 1-yard run, Andrew Lastovka kick (Drive: 13 plays, 86 yards, 7:31; YSU 14–0)
- (0:20) UNI – Desmond Hutson 16-yard pass from Aidan Dunne, Caden Palmer kick (Drive: 6 plays, 63 yards, 3:49; YSU 14–7)

Third quarter

- (11:05) UNI – Layne Pryor 6-yard pass from Aidan Dunne, Caden Palmer kick (Drive: 6 plays, 63 yards, 3:49; Tied 14–14)
- (5:23) UNI – Tye Edwards 29-yard pass from Aidan Dunne, Caden Palmer kick (Drive: 1 play, 29 yards, 0:10; UNI 21–14)

Fourth quarter

- (8:02) YSU – Cyrus Traugh 22-yard pass from Beau Brungard, Andrew Lastovka kick (Drive: 13 plays, 75 yards, 7:31; Tied 21–21)
- (5:03) YSU – Andrew Lastovka 51-yard field goal (Drive: 5 plays, 26 yards, 1:23; YSU 24–21)
- (4:50) UNI – Sergio Morancy 97-yard kickoff return, Caden Palmer kick (UNI 28–24)
- (1:18) YSU – Max Tomczak 12-yard pass from Beau Brungard, Andrew Lastovka kick (Drive: 8 plays, 65 yards, 3:22; YSU 31–28)
- (0:02) UNI – Caden Palmer 32-yard field goal (Drive: 9 plays, 57 yards, 1:12; Tied 31-31)

Overtime

- UNI – Tye Edwards 7-yard run, Caden Palmer kick (Drive: 3 plays, 25 yards; UNI 38–31)
- YSU – Tyshon King 9-yard run, Beau Brungard pass to Austin Bray for two-point conversion (Drive: 6 plays, 25 yards; YSU 39–38)

Statistics	UNI	YSU
First downs	14	25
Total yards	308	402
Rushing yards	111	146
Passing yards	197	256
Passing: Comp–Att–Int	16–26–0	31–36–0
Time of possession	22:14	37:46

Team	Category	Player	Statistics
Northern Iowa	Passing	Aidan Dunne	16/26, 197 yards, 3 TD
Northern Iowa	Rushing	Tye Edwards	12 carries, 60 yards, TD
Northern Iowa	Receiving	Desmond Hutson	7 receptions, 101 yards, TD
Youngstown State	Passing	Beau Brungard	31/36, 256 yards, 2 TD
Youngstown State	Rushing	Beau Brungard	16 carries, 78 yards, 2 TD
Youngstown State	Receiving	Max Tomczak	10 receptions, 87 yards, TD

=== Indiana State ===
Game Twelve – Indiana State Sycamores (4–7) vs Northern Iowa Panthers (2–9) – Game summary

Quarter	1	2	3	4	Total
Sycamores	0	0	0	0	0
Panthers	0	0	0	0	0

at UNI-Dome • Cedar Falls, IA

- Date: Saturday November 23, 2024
- Game time: 1:00 p.m.
- Game weather: 0 °F (−18 °C)
- TV: ESPN+

Game information

First quarter
Second quarter
Third quarter
Fourth quarter

Statistics	INST	UNI
First downs		
Total yards		
Rushing yards		
Passing yards		
Passing: Comp–Att–Int		
Time of possession		

Team	Category	Player	Statistics
Indiana State	Passing		
Indiana State	Rushing		
Indiana State	Receiving		
Northern Iowa	Passing		
Northern Iowa	Rushing		
Northern Iowa	Receiving		
