= 2025 NCAA Division I Football Championship Game =

Postseason college football game

2025 NCAA Division I Football Championship
- FCS National Championship Game
North Dakota State Bison	Montana State Bobcats
(13–2)	(15–0)
Missouri Valley	Big Sky
35	32
Head coach: Tim Polasek	Head coach: Brent Vigen
STATS / Seed; 3 / 2	STATS / Seed; 1 / 1
	1	2	3	4	Total
North Dakota State	14	7	0	14	35
Montana State	0	3	15	14	32
- Date: January 6, 2025
- Season: 2024
- Stadium: Toyota Stadium
- Location: Frisco, Texas
- MVP: Cam Miller (QB, North Dakota State)
- Favorite: Montana State by 6.5 points
- Referee: Matt Overton (CAA)
- Attendance: 18,005

United States TV coverage
- Network: ESPN, ESPN+
- Announcers: Dave Flemming (play-by-play), Brock Osweiler (color), Stormy Buonantony (sideline)

International TV coverage
- Network: Canada: TSN2/TSN+

The 2025 NCAA Division I Football Championship Game was a college football game played on January 6, 2025, at Toyota Stadium in Frisco, Texas. The game determined the national champion of NCAA Division I FCS for the 2024 season, and featured the two finalists of the 24-team playoff bracket, which began on November 30, 2024. The Monday night game began at approximately 6:00 p.m. CST and was broadcast on ESPN and ESPN+.

The game featured North Dakota State and Montana State. North Dakota State won, 35–32, and secured their 10th and final football championship at this level, all of them occurring since the 2011 season; North Dakota State moved up to the Bowl Subdivision the following year.

== Teams ==
=== North Dakota State ===
North Dakota State finished its regular season at 10–2; its losses started and ended the regular season, 31–26 at Colorado on August 29, and 29–28 vs. South Dakota on November 23. NDSU was seeded No. 2, giving the Bison a bye and home field advantage throughout the playoffs, where they defeated No. 15 Abilene Christian 51–31, No. 7 Mercer 31–7, and Dakota Marker rival – No. 3 South Dakota State 28–21.

The 2025 FCS championship game marked the 11th trip to Frisco for the Bison since the 2012 NCAA Division I Football Championship Game against Sam Houston State, with NDSU being 9–1 in championship games, losing its most recent appearance against South Dakota State 45–21 in 2023, with its last win coming the year before against the Bobcats 38–10.

North Dakota State was led by Walter Payton Award runner-up Cam Miller, who entered the game with 3,052 yards passing, 31 touchdowns, and 4 interceptions, along with 510 yards and 10 touchdowns on the ground. Jerry Rice Award winner CharMar Brown led the Bison's rushing attack with 1,104 yards and 14 touchdowns, with Barika Kpeenu adding 714 yards and 7 touchdowns. Bryce Lance led the Bison in receiving with 66 catches, 946 yards, and 16 touchdowns for a new school record.

=== Montana State ===
Montana State finished its regular season with an unblemished 12–0 record, with its highest-profile wins over New Mexico 35–31 and UC Davis 30–28. Its playoff schedule started with a bye as it was the No. 1 seed and gave it home-field advantage, where the Bobcats defeated UT Martin 49–17, No. 8 Idaho 52–19, and No. 4 South Dakota 31–17.

Montana State's last championship appearance came against the Bison three years ago where the Bobcats fell 38–10. The last time Montana State won the FCS title was in 1984 against Louisiana Tech with a 19–6 win in Charleston, South Carolina.

A win would have given the Bobcats a 16–0 record for the season, which has only been done by Yale in 1894 and North Dakota State in 2019.

Montana State was led by Walter Payton Award winner Tommy Mellott, who came into the game having thrown for 2,588 yards, 29 touchdowns, and 2 interceptions while also being the team's third-leading rusher with 915 yards and 14 touchdowns. The Bobcats were led in rushing by Scottre Humphrey, who had 1,360 yards and 15 touchdowns while Jerry Rice Award runner-up Adam Jones was second with 1,114 yards and 14 touchdowns. Taco Dowler was the team's leading receiver with 35 catches for 546 yards and 10 touchdowns.

== Game summary ==
2024 NCAA Division I Football Championship Game

Quarter	1	2	3	4	Total
No. 2 North Dakota State	14	7	0	14	35
No. 1 Montana State	0	3	15	14	32

at Toyota Stadium • Frisco, Texas

- Date: January 6, 2025
- Game time: 6:03 p.m. CST
- Game weather: Clear • Temperature: 34 °F (1 °C) • Wind: 7 mph (11 km/h) northwest
- Game attendance: 18,005
- Referee: Matt Overton
- TV announcers (ESPN, ESPN+): Dave Flemming (Play-by-Play), Brock Osweiler (color), Stormy Buonantony (sideline reporter)
- Box score

Scoring summary

Quarter	Time	Drive			Team	Scoring information	Score	
Quarter	Time	Plays	Yards	TOP	Team	Scoring information	North Dakota State	Montana State
1	7:55	12	75	7:05	North Dakota State	Cam Miller 2-yard touchdown run, Griffin Crosa kick good	7	0
1	1:51	5	92	3:05	North Dakota State	Cam Miller 64-yard touchdown run, Griffin Crosa kick good	14	0
2	5:38	17	61	11:13	Montana State	32-yard field goal by Myles Sansted	14	3
2	0:12	10	56	0:47	North Dakota State	Bryce Lance 1-yard touchdown reception from Cam Miller, Griffin Crosa kick good	21	3
3	8:09	11	75	6:51	Montana State	Scottre Humphrey 1-yard touchdown run, Myles Sansted kick good	21	10
3	4:03	2	58	0:57	Montana State	Rohan Jones 5-yard touchdown reception from Tommy Mellott, 2-point pass to Ryan Lonergan good	21	18
4	14:18	8	75	4:45	North Dakota State	Joe Stoffel 1-yard touchdown reception from Cam Miller, Griffin Crosa kick good	28	18
4	11:25	5	75	2:53	Montana State	Tommy Mellott 44-yard touchdown run, Myles Sansted kick good	28	25
4	2:41	9	66	5:06	North Dakota State	CharMar Brown 3-yard touchdown run, Griffin Crosa kick good	35	25
4	1:09	10	73	1:32	Montana State	Taco Dowler 19-yard touchdown reception from Tommy Mellott, Myles Sansted kick good	35	32
"TOP" = time of possession. For other American football terms, see Glossary of American football.								

=== Statistics ===
Statistics	North Dakota State	Montana State
First downs	17	19
Plays–yards	59–402	61–394
Rushes–yards	36–202	37–199
Passing yards	200	195
Passing: comp–att–int	19–23–0	13–24–0
Turnovers		
Time of possession	28:59	31:01

Team	Category	Player	Statistics
North Dakota State	Passing	Cam Miller	19/23, 200 yards, 2 TD
North Dakota State	Rushing	Cam Miller	18 carries, 121 yards, 2 TD
North Dakota State	Receiving	Bryce Lance	9 receptions, 108 yards, 1 TD
Montana State	Passing	Tommy Mellott	13/24, 195 yards, 2 TD
Montana State	Rushing	Tommy Mellott	14 carries, 135 yards, 1 TD
Montana State	Receiving	Ryan Lonergan	1 reception, 53 yards
