= 2024 North Dakota State Bison football team =

American college football season

2024 North Dakota State Bison football

NCAA Division I champion MVFC co-champion

NCAA Division I Football Championship Game, W 35–32 vs. Montana State
- Conference: Missouri Valley Football Conference

Ranking
- STATS: No. 1
- FCS Coaches: No. 1
- Record: 14–2 (7–1 MVFC)
- Head coach: Tim Polasek (1st season)
- Offensive coordinator: Jake Landry (1st season)
- Offensive scheme: Pro-style
- Co-defensive coordinators: Nick Goeser (1st season); Grant Olson (1st season)
- Base defense: Multiple 4–3
- Home stadium: Fargodome

2024 Missouri Valley Football Conference standings
	Conf.			Overall
Team	W		L	W		L
No. 1 North Dakota State +^	7	–	1	14	–	2
No. 3 South Dakota State +^	7	–	1	12	–	3
No. 4 South Dakota +^	7	–	1	11	–	3
Missouri State *	6	–	2	8	–	4
No. 11 Illinois State ^	6	–	2	10	–	4
Youngstown State	3	–	5	4	–	8
Indiana State	3	–	5	4	–	8
North Dakota	2	–	6	5	–	7
Southern Illinois	2	–	6	4	–	8
Northern Iowa	1	–	7	3	–	9
Murray State	0	–	8	1	–	11
+ – Conference co-champions; ^ – FCS playoff participant; * – Ineligible for 2024 FCS playoffs due to transition to the FBS; Rankings from STATS Poll

The 2024 North Dakota State Bison football team represented North Dakota State University as a member of the Missouri Valley Football Conference (MVFC) during the 2024 NCAA Division I FCS football season. The Bison were led by first-year head coach Tim Polasek. Polasek joined the Bison after being an offensive coordinator at North Dakota State, Iowa, and most recently, Wyoming. Polasek was assisted by first-year offensive coordinator Jake Landry, who joined the Bison from St. Thomas, as well as co-defensive coordinators Grant Olson and Nick Goeser. The Bison played their home games at the Fargodome in Fargo, North Dakota.

The Bison finished their regular season with a 10–2 record (7–1 in conference), losing to Colorado and South Dakota. They were seeded second in the FCS playoffs and received a first round bye; they then defeated Abilene Christian, Mercer, and South Dakota State to reach the championship game. The Bison completed their season by defeating Montana State on January 6 in Frisco, Texas, to capture the program's tenth FCS title in 14 seasons, and 18th overall title. This would also be North Dakota State's final championship at the FCS level, as they would start their transition to the FBS in 2026.

== Preseason ==
=== MVFC poll ===
The Missouri Valley Football Conference released its preseason poll on July 22, 2024, voted on by league athletic directors, coaches, and media members. The Bison were predicted to finish second in the conference.

== Schedule ==
Date	Time	Opponent	Rank	Site	TV	Result	Attendance
August 29	7:00 pm	at Colorado*	No. 2	Folsom Field; Boulder, CO	ESPN	L 26–31	49,438
September 7	2:30 pm	Tennessee State*	No. 2	Fargodome; Fargo, ND	ABC ND/ESPN+	W 52–3	16,811
September 14	4:30 pm	at East Tennessee State*	No. 2	William B. Greene Jr. Stadium; Johnson City, TN	ABC ND/ESPN+	W 38–35	11,040
September 21	1:00 pm	Towson*^{†}	No. 2	Fargodome; Fargo, ND	ABC ND/ESPN+	W 41–24	17,185
September 28	2:00 pm	at No. 18 Illinois State	No. 2	Hancock Stadium; Normal, IL	ABC ND/ESPN+	W 42–10	11,687
October 5	2:30 pm	No. 7 North Dakota	No. 2	Fargodome; Fargo, ND (Nickel Trophy)	ABC ND/MidcoSN/ESPN+	W 41–17	18,723
October 12	2:00 pm	at Southern Illinois	No. 2	Saluki Stadium; Carbondale, IL	ESPN+	W 24–3	9,610
October 19	7:00 pm	No. 1 South Dakota State	No. 2	Fargodome; Fargo, ND (Dakota Marker)	ESPN2	W 13–9	18,807
October 26	1:00 pm	at Murray State	No. 1	Roy Stewart Stadium; Murray, KY	ABC ND/ESPN+	W 59–6	6,133
November 2	2:30 pm	Northern Iowa	No. 1	Fargodome; Fargo, ND	ABC ND/ESPN+	W 42–19	14,528
November 16	2:30 pm	Missouri State	No. 1	Fargodome; Fargo, ND	ABC ND/ESPN+	W 59–21	14,679
November 23	1:00 pm	at No. 4 South Dakota	No. 1	DakotaDome; Vermillion, SD	ABC ND/MidcoSN/ESPN+	L 28–29	9,062
December 7	2:00 pm	No. 15 Abilene Christian*	No. 3	Fargodome; Fargo, ND (NCAA Division I Second Round)	ESPN+	W 51–31	10,373
December 14	2:30 pm	No. 8 Mercer*	No. 3	Fargodome; Fargo, ND (NCAA Division I Quarterfinal)	ABC	W 31–7	10,353
December 21	11:00 am	No. 2 South Dakota State*	No. 3	Fargodome; Fargo, ND (NCAA Division I Semifinal)	ABC	W 28–21	17,849
January 6, 2025	6:00 pm	vs. No. 1 Montana State*	No. 3	Toyota Stadium; Frisco, TX (NCAA Division I Championship Game)	ESPN	W 35–32	18,005
*Non-conference game; ^{†}Homecoming; Rankings from STATS Poll released prior to the game; All times are in Central time

== Game summaries ==
=== Regular season ===
==== Colorado (FBS) ====
No. 2 North Dakota State Bison (0–0) vs. Colorado Buffaloes (0–0)

Quarter	1	2	3	4	Total
No. 2 Bison	10	10	0	6	26
Buffaloes	14	3	7	7	31

at Folsum Field, Boulder, CO

- Date: August 29, 2024
- Game time: 7:00 pm
- Game weather: Clear; 75 °F (24 °C)
- Game attendance: 49,438
- Referee: Stephen Baron
- TV announcers (ESPN): Mark Jones (play-by-play), Roddy Jones (analyst), and Quint Kessenich (sideline)

Statistics	North Dakota State	Colorado
First downs	25	22
Plays–yards	69–449	57–504
Rushes–yards	43–157	23–59
Passing yards	292	445
Passing: comp–att–int	20–26–0	26–34–1
Turnovers		
Time of possession	36:44	23:16

Team	Category	Player	Statistics
North Dakota State	Passing	Cam Miller	18/22, 277 yds, TD
North Dakota State	Rushing	Cam Miller	16 car, 81 yds, TD
North Dakota State	Receiving	Braylon Henderson	5 rec, 72 yds
Colorado	Passing	Shedeur Sanders	26/34, 445 yds, 4 TD, INT
Colorado	Rushing	Dallan Hayden	9 car, 20 yds
Colorado	Receiving	Jimmy Horn Jr.	7 rec, 198 yds, TD

Scoring summary

Quarter	Time	Drive			Team	Scoring information	Score	
Quarter	Time	Plays	Yards	TOP	Team	Scoring information	NDSU	CU
1st	12:12	6	57	2:48	NDSU	36-yard field goal by Griffin Crosa (#39)	3	0
1st	9:31	6	75	2:42	CU	Travis Hunter (#12) 41-yard touchdown reception from Shedeur Sanders (#2), Alejandro Mata (#16) kick good	3	7
1st	3:59	10	75	5:32	NDSU	Joe Stoffel (#82) 7-yard touchdown reception from Cam Miller (#7), Griffin Crosa (#39) kick good	10	7
1st	3:15	2	75	0:44	CU	Jimmy Horn Jr. (#5) 69-yard touchdown reception from Shedeur Sanders (#2), Alejandro Mata (#16) kick good	10	14
2nd	12:07	10	77	6:02	NDSU	Cam Miller (#7) 7-yard touchdown run, Griffin Crosa (#39) kick good	17	14
2nd	4:33	11	21	5:36	NDSU	31-yard field goal by Griffin Crosa (#39)	20	14
2nd	0:00	8	89	0:56	CU	27-yard field goal by Alejandro Mata (#16)	20	17
3rd	7:45	5	72	2:04	CU	Travis Hunter (#12) 13-yard touchdown reception from Shedeur Sanders (#2), Alejandro Mata (#16) kick good	20	24
4th	7:57	17	80	8:10	CU	Travis Hunter (#12) 3-yard touchdown reception from Shedeur Sanders (#2), Alejandro Mata (#16) kick good	20	31
4th	2:19	11	75	5:38	NDSU	Cam Miller (#7) 20-yard touchdown run, 2-point pass incomplete	26	31
"TOP" = time of possession. For other American football terms, see Glossary of American football.							26	31

==== Tennessee State ====
Tennessee State Tigers (1–0) vs. No. 2 North Dakota State Bison (0–1)

Quarter	1	2	3	4	Total
Tigers	0	0	0	3	3
No. 2 Bison	14	21	3	14	52

at Fargodome, Fargo, ND

- Date: September 7, 2024
- Game time: 2:30 pm
- Game weather: Indoors; 70 °F (21 °C)
- Game attendance: 16,811
- Referee: David Hergert
- TV: ESPN+

Statistics	Tennessee State	North Dakota State
First downs	12	21
Plays–yards	55–200	64–436
Rushes–yards	30–72	41–226
Passing yards	128	210
Passing: comp–att–int	17–25–0	17–23–1
Turnovers		
Time of possession	29:46	30:14

Team	Category	Player	Statistics
Tennessee State	Passing	Draylen Ellis	17/25, 128 yds
Tennessee State	Rushing	Draylen Ellis	11 car, 27 yds
Tennessee State	Receiving	Jalal Dean	3 rec, 51 yds
North Dakota State	Passing	Cam Miller	14/18, 181 yds, 3 TD
North Dakota State	Rushing	Nathan Hayes	1 car, 51 yds, TD
North Dakota State	Receiving	Bryce Lance	7 rec, 106 yds, 2 TD

Scoring summary

Quarter	Time	Drive			Team	Scoring information	Score	
Quarter	Time	Plays	Yards	TOP	Team	Scoring information	TNST	NDSU
1st	6:47	12	77	6:21	NDSU	Cam Miller (#7) 24-yard touchdown run, Griffin Crosa (#39) kick good	0	7
1st	2:20	6	69	2:22	NDSU	Bryce Lance (#5) 14-yard touchdown reception from Cam Miller (#7), Griffin Crosa (#39) kick good	0	14
2nd	9:37	4	4	2:02	NDSU	CharMar Brown (#25) 3-yard touchdown run, Griffin Crosa (#39) kick good	0	21
2nd	3:13	8	76	4:04	NDSU	John Gores (#80) 12-yard touchdown reception from Cam Miller (#7), Griffin Crosa (#39) kick good	0	28
2nd	0:16	8	60	1:00	NDSU	Bryce Lance (#5) 6-yard touchdown reception from Cam Miller (#7), Griffin Crosa (#39) kick good	0	35
3rd	8:33	4	7	2:02	NDSU	51-yard field goal by Eli Ozick (#38)	0	38
4th	13:32	4	30	1:30	NDSU	Mekhi Collins (#15) 19-yard touchdown reception from Cole Payton (#9), Eli Ozick (#38) kick good	0	45
4th	10:46	3	57	1:00	NDSU	Nathan Hayes (#12) 51-yard touchdown run, Eli Ozick (#38) kick good	0	52
4th	5:34	9	74	5:12	TNST	19-yard field goal by James Lowery (#99)	3	52
"TOP" = time of possession. For other American football terms, see Glossary of American football.							3	52

==== East Tennessee State ====
No. 2 North Dakota State Bison (1–1) vs. East Tennessee State Buccaneers (1–1)

Quarter	1	2	3	4	Total
No. 2 Bison	14	3	6	15	38
Buccaneers	7	14	7	7	35

at William B. Greene Jr. Stadium, Johnson City, TN

- Date: September 14, 2024
- Game time: 4:30 pm
- Game weather: Clear; 79 °F (26 °C); Wind: E 10 mph
- Game attendance: 11,040
- Referee: Bruce Austin
- TV: ESPN+

Statistics	North Dakota State	East Tennessee State
First downs	28	20
Plays–yards	78–481	54–383
Rushes–yards	44–231	38–270
Passing yards	250	113
Passing: comp–att–int	21–34–0	6–16–1
Turnovers		
Time of possession	36:41	23:19

Team	Category	Player	Statistics
North Dakota State	Passing	Cam Miller	21/33, 250 yds, TD
North Dakota State	Rushing	CharMar Brown	11 car, 65 yds
North Dakota State	Receiving	Mekhi Collins	4 rec, 67 yds
East Tennessee State	Passing	Jaylen King	6/15, 113 yds, TD, INT
East Tennessee State	Rushing	Bryson Irby	15 car, 147 yds, 3 TD
East Tennessee State	Receiving	Cameron Lewis	5 rec, 73 yds, TD

Scoring summary

Quarter	Time	Drive			Team	Scoring information	Score	
Quarter	Time	Plays	Yards	TOP	Team	Scoring information	NDSU	ETSU
1st	9:58	9	82	4:57	NDSU	Bryce Lance (#5) 18-yard touchdown run, Griffin Crosa (#39) kick good	7	0
1st	5:32	10	75	4:26	ETSU	Bryson Irby (#7) 3-yard touchdown run, Ewan Johnson (#15) kick good	7	7
1st	1:12	8	75	4:20	NDSU	Joe Stoffel (#82) 5-yard touchdown reception from Cam Miller (#7), Griffin Crosa (#39) kick good	14	7
2nd	13:13	6	75	2:59	ETSU	Ty Anderson (#10) 1-yard touchdown run, Ewan Johnson (#15) kick good	14	14
2nd	10:26	5	16	2:37	NDSU	54-yard field goal by Eli Ozick (#38)	17	14
2nd	8:55	5	75	1:31	ETSU	Bryson Irby (#7) 61-yard touchdown run, Ewan Johnson (#15) kick good	17	21
3rd	8:21	14	75	6:39	ETSU	Bryson Irby (#7) 10-yard touchdown run, Ewan Johnson (#15) kick good	17	28
3rd	1:08	13	57	7:06	NDSU	Cam Miller (#7) 1-yard touchdown run, 2-point pass incomplete	23	28
4th	8:39	4	63	2:23	ETSU	Cameron Lewis (#0) 19-yard touchdown reception from Jaylen King (#2), Ewan Johnson (#15) kick good	23	35
4th	1:59	6	51	0:50	NDSU	TK Marshall (#28) 3-yard touchdown run, Griffin Crosa (#39) kick good	30	35
4th	0:50	6	58	1:07	NDSU	Cam Miller (#7) 11-yard touchdown run, 2-point pass to Bryce Lance (#5) good	38	35
"TOP" = time of possession. For other American football terms, see Glossary of American football.							38	35

==== Towson ====
No. RV Towson Tigers (1–2) vs. No. 2 North Dakota State Bison (2–1)

Quarter	1	2	3	4	Total
No. RV Tigers	3	0	7	14	24
No. 2 Bison	3	21	7	10	41

at Fargodome, Fargo, ND

- Date: September 21, 2024
- Game time: 1:00 pm
- Game weather: Indoors; 70 °F (21 °C)
- Game attendance: 17,185
- Referee: Tyler Downs
- TV: ESPN+

Statistics	Towson	North Dakota State
First downs	16	26
Plays–yards	51–366	72–407
Rushes–yards	24–204	52–188
Passing yards	161	219
Passing: comp–att–int	16–27–1	17–20–0
Turnovers		
Time of possession	20:07	39:53

Team	Category	Player	Statistics
Towson	Passing	Carlos Davis	14/24, 135 yds, INT
Towson	Rushing	Tyrell Greene Jr.	5 car, 94 yds, TD
Towson	Receiving	Carter Runyon	6 rec, 59 yds
North Dakota State	Passing	Cam Miller	17/19, 219 yds, TD
North Dakota State	Rushing	CharMar Brown	24 car, 126 yds, 3 TD
North Dakota State	Receiving	Bryce Lance	5 rec, 63 yds, TD

Scoring summary

Quarter	Time	Drive			Team	Scoring information	Score	
Quarter	Time	Plays	Yards	TOP	Team	Scoring information	TOW	NDSU
1st	8:45	10	57	6:12	NDSU	37-yard field goal by Griffin Crosa (#39)	0	3
1st	5:46	8	52	2:59	TOW	40-yard field goal by Keegan Vaughan	3	3
2nd	13:57	11	80	6:45	NDSU	CharMar Brown (#25) 1-yard touchdown run, Griffin Crosa (#39) kick good	3	10
2nd	5:26				NDSU	Punt returned 67 yards for touchdown by Jackson Williams (#81), Griffin Crosa (#39) kick good	3	17
2nd	0:23	9	88	3:16	NDSU	Bryce Lance (#5) 19-yard touchdown reception from Cam Miller (#7), Griffin Crosa (#39) kick good	3	24
3rd	5:33	8	74	3:36	TOW	Nathan Kent 2-yard touchdown run, Keegan Vaughan kick good	10	24
3rd	1:09	9	83	4:17	NDSU	CharMar Brown (#25) 3-yard touchdown run, Griffin Crosa (#39) kick good	10	31
4th	12:00	10	65	4:09	TOW	Carlos Davis 15-yard touchdown run, Keegan Vaughan kick good	17	31
4th	10:05	1	72	0:11	TOW	Tyrell Greene Jr. 72-yard touchdown run, Keegan Vaughan kick good	24	31
4th	4:28	9	40	5:28	NDSU	34-yard field goal by Griffin Crosa (#39)	24	34
4th	1:04	7	20	1:47	NDSU	CharMar Brown (#25) 1-yard touchdown run, Griffin Crosa (#39) kick good	24	41
"TOP" = time of possession. For other American football terms, see Glossary of American football.							24	41

==== Illinois State ====
No. 2 North Dakota State Bison (3–1) vs. No. 18 Illinois State Redbirds (3–1)

Quarter	1	2	3	4	Total
No. 2 Bison	7	7	21	7	42
No. 18 Redbirds	0	7	0	3	10

at Hancock Stadium, Normal, IL

- Date: September 28, 2024
- Game time: 2:00 pm
- Game weather: Sunny; 73 °F (23 °C)
- Game attendance: 11,687
- Referee: Aaron Adams
- TV: ESPN+

Statistics	North Dakota State	Illinois State
First downs	29	12
Plays–yards	71–544	49–206
Rushes–yards	47–307	25–8
Passing yards	237	198
Passing: comp–att–int	21–24–0	17–24–0
Turnovers		
Time of possession	38:57	21:03

Team	Category	Player	Statistics
North Dakota State	Passing	Cam Miller	20/23, 216 yds, 3 TD
North Dakota State	Rushing	CharMar Brown	17 car, 100 yds, TD
North Dakota State	Receiving	Bryce Lance	8 rec, 65 yds, TD
Illinois State	Passing	Tommy Rittenhouse	10/14, 132 yds
Illinois State	Rushing	Wenkers Wright	9 car, 24 yds, TD
Illinois State	Receiving	Xavier Loyd	3 rec, 52 yds

Scoring summary

Quarter	Time	Drive			Team	Scoring information	Score	
Quarter	Time	Plays	Yards	TOP	Team	Scoring information	NDSU	ILST
1st	6:45	11	64	6:47	NDSU	Bryce Lance (#5) 7-yard touchdown reception from Cam Miller (#7), Griffin Crosa (#39) kick good	7	0
2nd	4:45	16	80	10:09	NDSU	Mekhi Collins (#15) 11-yard touchdown reception from Cam Miller (#7), Griffin Crosa (#39) kick good	14	0
2nd	2:56	5	74	1:43	ILST	Wenkers Wright (#32) 2-yard touchdown run, Ian Wagner (#31) kick good	14	7
3rd	10:55	7	69	4:01	NDSU	Barika Kpeenu (#8) 40-yard touchdown reception from Cam Miller (#7), Griffin Crosa (#39) kick good	21	7
3rd	6:07	6	51	3:05	NDSU	CharMar Brown (#25) 14-yard touchdown run, Griffin Crosa (#39) kick good	28	7
3rd	1:51	4	48	2:25	NDSU	Barika Kpeenu (#8) 9-yard touchdown run, Griffin Crosa (#39) kick good	35	7
4th	11:27	4	97	2:18	NDSU	Cole Payton (#9) 73-yard touchdown run, Griffin Crosa (#39) kick good	42	7
4th	5:44	13	54	5:43	ILST	38-yard field goal by Ian Wagner (#31)	42	10
"TOP" = time of possession. For other American football terms, see Glossary of American football.							42	10

==== North Dakota ====
No. 7 North Dakota Fighting Hawks (4–1) vs. No. 2 North Dakota State Bison (4–1)

Quarter	1	2	3	4	Total
No. 7 Fighting Hawks	0	10	0	7	17
No. 2 Bison	14	10	14	3	41

at Fargodome, Fargo, ND

- Date: October 5, 2024
- Game time: 2:30 pm
- Game weather: Indoors; 70 °F (21 °C)
- Game attendance: 18,723
- Referee: Gregory Gompf
- TV: ESPN+

Statistics	North Dakota	North Dakota State
First downs	14	25
Plays–yards	54–267	69–429
Rushes–yards	31–101	45–208
Passing yards	166	221
Passing: comp–att–int	18–23–0	16–24–0
Turnovers		
Time of possession	25:41	34:19

Team	Category	Player	Statistics
North Dakota	Passing	Simon Romfo	18/23, 166 yds, TD
North Dakota	Rushing	Gaven Ziebarth	12 car, 65 yds
North Dakota	Receiving	Bo Belquist	4 rec, 61 yds
North Dakota State	Passing	Cam Miller	13/19, 168 yds, 2 TD
North Dakota State	Rushing	CharMar Brown	21 car, 83 yds, TD
North Dakota State	Receiving	Bryce Lance	2 rec, 50 yds, TD

Scoring summary

Quarter	Time	Drive			Team	Scoring information	Score	
Quarter	Time	Plays	Yards	TOP	Team	Scoring information	UND	NDSU
1st	10:39	7	56	4:11	NDSU	CharMar Brown (#25) 2-yard touchdown run, Griffin Crosa (#39) kick good	0	7
1st	2:14	7	61	3:36	NDSU	Bryce Lance (#5) 36-yard touchdown reception from Cam Miller (#7), Griffin Crosa (#39) kick good	0	14
2nd	10:38	11	75	3:36	UND	Quincy Vaughn (#1) 1-yard touchdown run, CJ Elrichs (#53) kick good	7	14
2nd	7:47	5	65	2:51	NDSU	Chris Harris (#15) 16-yard touchdown reception from Cam Miller (#7), Griffin Crosa (#39) kick good	7	21
2nd	3:02	10	47	4:45	UND	45-yard field goal by CJ Elrichs (#53)	10	21
2nd	0:34	11	58	2:20	NDSU	34-yard field goal by Griffin Crosa (#39)	10	24
3rd	11:10	8	38	3:44	NDSU	Cam Miller (#7) 2-yard touchdown run, Griffin Crosa (#39) kick good	10	31
3rd	3:02	9	85	4:59	NDSU	Mekhi Collins (#16) 33-yard touchdown reception from Cole Payton (#9), Griffin Crosa (#39) kick good	10	38
4th	12:33	1	5	0:04	UND	Caden Dennis (#10) 5-yard touchdown reception from Simon Romfo (#6), CJ Elrichs (#53) kick good	17	38
4th	5:58	13	48	6:35	NDSU	45-yard field goal by Griffin Crosa (#39)	17	41
"TOP" = time of possession. For other American football terms, see Glossary of American football.							17	41

==== Southern Illinois ====
No. 2 North Dakota State Bison (5–1) vs. No. RV Southern Illinois Salukis (2–4)

Quarter	1	2	3	4	Total
No. 2 Bison	7	7	3	7	24
No. RV Salukis	0	3	0	0	3

at Saluki Stadium, Carbondale, IL

- Date: October 12, 2024
- Game time: 2:00 pm
- Game weather: Cloudy; 82 °F (28 °C); Wind: NE 7 mph
- Game attendance: 9,610
- Referee: David Hergert
- TV: ESPN+

Statistics	North Dakota State	Southern Illinois
First downs	22	14
Plays–yards	67–363	50–187
Rushes–yards	42–163	23–35
Passing yards	200	152
Passing: comp–att–int	19–25–0	15–27–1
Turnovers		
Time of possession	35:29	24:31

Team	Category	Player	Statistics
North Dakota State	Passing	Cam Miller	18/24, 193 yds, TD
North Dakota State	Rushing	CharMar Brown	20 car, 95 yds, TD
North Dakota State	Receiving	Bryce Lance	5 rec, 63 yds
Southern Illinois	Passing	Jake Curry	15/27, 152 yds, INT
Southern Illinois	Rushing	Keontez Lewis	2 car, 20 yds
Southern Illinois	Receiving	Allen Middleton	5 rec, 60 yds

Scoring summary

Quarter	Time	Drive			Team	Scoring information	Score	
Quarter	Time	Plays	Yards	TOP	Team	Scoring information	NDSU	SIU
1st	6:55	7	76	3:47	NDSU	Barika Kpeenu (#8) 6-yard touchdown run, Griffin Crosa (#39) kick good	7	0
2nd	5:17	9	42	5:34	SIU	50-yard field goal by Paul Geelen (#97)	7	3
2nd	0:31	14	75	4:46	NDSU	Chris Harris (#19) 11-yard touchdown reception from Cam Miller (#7), Griffin Crosa (#39) kick good	14	3
3rd	5:49	9	52	4:26	NDSU	34-yard field goal by Griffin Crosa (#39)	17	3
4th	4:09	11	87	7:03	NDSU	CharMar Brown (#25) 9-yard touchdown run, Griffin Crosa (#39) kick good	24	3
"TOP" = time of possession. For other American football terms, see Glossary of American football.							24	3

==== South Dakota State ====
No. 1 South Dakota State Jackrabbits (5–1) vs. No. 2 North Dakota State Bison (6–1)

Quarter	1	2	3	4	Total
No. 1 Jackrabbits	0	9	0	0	9
No. 2 Bison	0	7	0	6	13

at Fargodome, Fargo, ND

- Date: October 19, 2024
- Game time: 7:00 pm
- Game weather: Indoors; 70 °F (21 °C)
- Game attendance: 18,807
- Referee: Jason Perkins
- TV announcers (ESPN2): Jay Alter (play-by-play), Rocky Boiman (analyst)

Statistics	South Dakota State	North Dakota State
First downs	17	17
Plays–yards	66–333	59–275
Rushes–yards	36–215	32–112
Passing yards	118	163
Passing: comp–att–int	17–30–1	20–27–0
Turnovers	1	0
Time of possession	28:10	31:50

Team	Category	Player	Statistics
South Dakota State	Passing	Mark Gronowski	14/21, 92 yds
South Dakota State	Rushing	Chase Mason	5 car, 80 yds, TD
South Dakota State	Receiving	Griffin Wilde	5 rec, 32 yds
North Dakota State	Passing	Cam Miller	20/27, 163 yds, 2 TD
North Dakota State	Rushing	Barika Kpeenu	6 car, 35 yds
North Dakota State	Receiving	RaJa Nelson	4 rec, 48 yds, 2 TD

Scoring summary

Quarter	Time	Drive			Team	Scoring information	Score	
Quarter	Time	Plays	Yards	TOP	Team	Scoring information	SDSU	NDSU
2nd	6:03	13	69	7:08	NDSU	RaJa Nelson (#3) 18-yard touchdown reception from Cam Miller, Griffin Crosa (#39) kick good	0	7
2nd	4:43	3	75	1:20	SDSU	Chase Mason (#7) 66-yard touchdown run, Hunter Dustman (#10) kick blocked	6	7
2nd	0:00	15	65	3:27	SDSU	42-yard field goal by Hunter Dustman (#10)	9	7
4th	1:49	10	92	5:25	NDSU	RaJa Nelson (#3) 20-yard touchdown reception from Cam Miller, 2-point pass incomplete	9	13
"TOP" = time of possession. For other American football terms, see Glossary of American football.							9	13

==== Murray State ====
No. 1 North Dakota State Bison (7–1) vs. Murray State Racers (1–6)

Quarter	1	2	3	4	Total
No. 1 Bison	21	21	10	7	59
Racers	0	3	0	3	6

at Roy Stewart Stadium, Murray, KY

- Date: October 26, 2024
- Game time: 1:00 pm
- Game weather: Cloudy; 66 °F (19 °C); Wind: NE 10 mph
- Game attendance: 6,133
- Referee: Aaron Adams
- TV: ESPN+

Statistics	North Dakota State	Murray State
First downs	23	19
Plays–yards	61–459	76–308
Rushes–yards	41–190	43–116
Passing yards	269	192
Passing: comp–att–int	14–20–0	18–33–3
Turnovers		
Time of possession	29:00	31:00

Team	Category	Player	Statistics
North Dakota State	Passing	Nathan Hayes	9/15, 141 yds, 2 TD
North Dakota State	Rushing	CharMar Brown	13 car, 97 yds, 3 TD
North Dakota State	Receiving	Bryce Lance	4 rec, 108 yds, 3 TD
Murray State	Passing	Jayden Johannsen	13/22, 139 yds, 3 INT
Murray State	Rushing	Q'Darryius Jennings	7 car, 36 yds
Murray State	Receiving	J'Kalon Carter	4 rec, 70 yds

Scoring summary

Quarter	Time	Drive			Team	Scoring information	Score	
Quarter	Time	Plays	Yards	TOP	Team	Scoring information	MUR	NDSU
1st	11:55	6	75	3:05	NDSU	CharMar Brown (#25) 7-yard touchdown run, Griffin Crosa (#39) kick good	0	7
1st	5:05	1	74	0:11	NDSU	Bryce Lance (#5) 74-yard touchdown reception from Cam Miller (#7), Griffin Crosa (#39) kick good	0	14
1st	4:14				NDSU	Interception returned 34 yards for touchdown by Enock Sibomana (#14), Griffin Crosa (#39) kick good	0	21
2nd	12:47	7	60	3:21	NDSU	CharMar Brown (#25) 3-yard touchdown run, Griffin Crosa (#39) kick good	0	28
2nd	8:32	10	69	4:15	MUR	24-yard field goal by James London (#83)	3	28
2nd	6:58	3	42	1:34	NDSU	Bryce Lance (#5) 17-yard touchdown reception from Cam Miller, Griffin Crosa (#39) kick good	3	35
2nd	0:53	7	80	2:08	NDSU	Bryce Lance (#5) 6-yard touchdown reception from Nathan Hayes (#12), Griffin Crosa (#39) kick good	3	42
3rd	13:16	5	30	1:38	NDSU	CharMar Brown (#25) 1-yard touchdown run, Griffin Crosa (#39) kick good	3	49
3rd	10:09	7	12	2:27	NDSU	31-yard field goal by Eli Ozick (#38)	3	52
4th	7:58	4	-2	1:13	MUR	47-yard field goal by James London (#83)	6	52
4th	1:11	12	75	6:47	NDSU	John Gores (#80) 9-yard touchdown reception from Nathan Hayes (#12), Griffin Crosa (#39) kick good	6	59
"TOP" = time of possession. For other American football terms, see Glossary of American football.							6	59

==== Northern Iowa ====
Northern Iowa Panthers (2–6) vs. No. 1 North Dakota State Bison (8–1)

Quarter	1	2	3	4	Total
Panthers	3	0	16	0	19
No. 1 Bison	14	14	7	7	42

at Fargodome, Fargo, ND

- Date: November 2, 2024
- Game time: 2:30 pm
- Game weather: Indoors; 70 °F (21 °C)
- Game attendance: 14,528
- Referee: Jason Berg
- TV: ESPN+

Statistics	Northern Iowa	North Dakota State
First downs	18	24
Plays–yards	58–344	58–422
Rushes–yards	26–74	37–189
Passing yards	270	233
Passing: comp–att–int	22–32–0	18–21–0
Turnovers		
Time of possession	28:46	31:14

Team	Category	Player	Statistics
Northern Iowa	Passing	Matthew Schecklman	22/32, 270 yds, 2 TD
Northern Iowa	Rushing	Tye Edwards	12 car, 48 yds
Northern Iowa	Receiving	Sergio Morancy	4 rec, 102 yds, 2 TD
North Dakota State	Passing	Cam Miller	17/20, 216 yds, 2 TD
North Dakota State	Rushing	CharMar Brown	18 car, 124 yds, TD
North Dakota State	Receiving	Bryce Lance	4 rec, 77 yds, TD

Scoring summary

Quarter	Time	Drive			Team	Scoring information	Score	
Quarter	Time	Plays	Yards	TOP	Team	Scoring information	UNI	NDSU
1st	14:44				NDSU	Kickoff returned 100 yards for touchdown by TK Marshall (#28), Griffin Crosa (#39) kick good	0	7
1st	8:44	12	52	6:00	UNI	40-yard field goal by Caden Palmer (#95)	3	7
1st	0:58	13	74	7:40	NDSU	CharMar Brown (#25) 5-yard touchdown run, Griffin Crosa (#39) kick good	3	14
2nd	6:54	13	94	6:34	NDSU	Bryce Lance (#5) 14-yard touchdown reception from Cam Miller (#7), Griffin Crosa (#39) kick good	3	21
2nd	1:47	7	80	2:57	NDSU	Braylon Henderson (#1) 15-yard touchdown reception from Cam Miller (#7), Griffin Crosa (#39) kick good	3	28
3rd	12:48	2	48	0:40	NDSU	Barika Kpeenu (#8) 6-yard touchdown run, Griffin Crosa (#39) kick good	3	35
3rd	9:05	6	75	3:43	UNI	Sergio Morancy (#21) 31-yard touchdown reception from Matthew Schecklman (#3), 2-point pass complete	11	35
3rd	1:52	9	55	4:18	UNI	Sergio Morancy (#21) 9-yard touchdown reception from Matthew Schecklman (#3), 2-point pass complete	19	35
4th	12:59	7	75	3:43	NDSU	Barika Kpeenu (#8) 11-yard touchdown run, Griffin Crosa (#39) kick good	19	42
"TOP" = time of possession. For other American football terms, see Glossary of American football.							19	42

==== Missouri State ====
Missouri State Bears (8–2) vs. No. 1 North Dakota State Bison (9–1)

Quarter	1	2	3	4	Total
Bears	0	14	0	7	21
No. 1 Bison	21	14	14	10	59

at Fargodome, Fargo, ND

- Date: November 16, 2024
- Game time: 2:30 pm
- Game weather: Indoors; 70 °F (21 °C)
- Game attendance: 14,679
- Referee: Jason Perkins
- TV: ESPN+

Statistics	Missouri State	North Dakota State
First downs	22	27
Plays–yards	67–382	65–575
Rushes–yards	65–86	38–364
Passing yards	296	211
Passing: comp–att–int	20–32–0	19–27–1
Turnovers		
Time of possession	31:21	28:39

Team	Category	Player	Statistics
Missouri State	Passing	Jacob Clark	18/30, 247 yds, TD
Missouri State	Rushing	Jacardia Wright	13 car, 68 yds, TD
Missouri State	Receiving	Hunter Wood	4 rec, 73 yds
North Dakota State	Passing	Cam Miller	17/24, 155 yds, 4 TD, INT
North Dakota State	Rushing	Barika Kpeenu	10 car, 169 yds, 2 TD
North Dakota State	Receiving	Chris Harris	3 rec, 48 yds

Scoring summary

Quarter	Time	Drive			Team	Scoring information	Score	
Quarter	Time	Plays	Yards	TOP	Team	Scoring information	MOST	NDSU
1st	13:14	2	52	0:19	NDSU	Barika Kpeenu (#8) 52-yard touchdown run, Griffin Crosa (#39) kick good	0	7
1st	10:48	5	13	2:12	NDSU	Joe Stoffel (#82) 3-yard touchdown reception from Cam Miller (#7), Griffin Crosa (#39) kick good	0	14
1st	1:32	12	95	7:09	NDSU	Jackson Williams (#81) 22-yard touchdown reception from Cam Miller (#7), Griffin Crosa (#39) kick good	0	21
2nd	8:16	9	80	4:09	NDSU	Bryce Lance (#5) 4-yard touchdown reception from Cam Miller (#7), Griffin Crosa (#39) kick good	0	28
2nd	2:48	10	78	5:22	MOST	Jacardia Wright (#9) 1-yard touchdown run, Yousef Obeid (#36) kick good	7	28
2nd	1:44	1	40	0:09	MOST	Jayden Becks (#5) 40-yard touchdown reception from Hunter Wood (#2), Yousef Obeid (#36) kick good	14	28
2nd	0:08	11	65	1:36	NDSU	Joe Stoffel (#82) 1-yard touchdown reception from Cam Miller (#7), Griffin Crosa (#39) kick good	14	35
3rd	13:03	4	75	1:57	NDSU	CharMar Brown (#25) 48-yard touchdown run, Griffin Crosa (#39) kick good	14	42
3rd	2:36	7	85	4:03	NDSU	Barika Kpeenu (#8) 49-yard touchdown run, Griffin Crosa (#39) kick good	14	49
4th	13:44	13	75	3:46	MOST	Jmariyae Robinson (#0) 2-yard touchdown reception from Jacob Clark (#12), Yousef Obeid (#36) kick good	21	49
4th	11:16	8	58	2:28	NDSU	32-yard field goal by Griffin Crosa (#39)	21	52
4th	7:47	3	31	1:28	NDSU	John Gores (#80) 27-yard touchdown reception from Nathan Hayes (#12), Griffin Crosa (#39) kick good	21	59
"TOP" = time of possession. For other American football terms, see Glossary of American football.							21	59

==== South Dakota ====
No. 1 North Dakota State Bison (10–1) vs. No. 4 South Dakota Coyotes (8–2)

Quarter	1	2	3	4	Total
No. 1 Bison	0	14	7	7	28
No. 4 Coyotes	7	7	3	12	29

at DakotaDome, Vermillion, SD

- Date: November 23, 2024
- Game time: 1:00 pm
- Game weather: Indoors; 70 °F (21 °C)
- Game attendance: 9,062
- Referee: Aaron Adams
- TV: ESPN+

Statistics	North Dakota State	South Dakota
First downs	19	23
Plays–yards	69–340	60–391
Rushes–yards	47–166	30–119
Passing yards	174	272
Passing: comp–att–int	10–22–0	18–30–0
Turnovers		
Time of possession	30:46	29:14

Team	Category	Player	Statistics
North Dakota State	Passing	Cam Miller	10/22, 174 yds, TD
North Dakota State	Rushing	Cam Miller	19 car, 82 yds, TD
North Dakota State	Receiving	RaJa Nelson	3 rec, 48 yds
South Dakota	Passing	Aidan Bouman	18/30, 272 yds, 2 TD
South Dakota	Rushing	Travis Theis	13 car, 66 yds, 2 TD
South Dakota	Receiving	Javion Phelps	3 rec, 79 yds, TD

Scoring summary

Quarter	Time	Drive			Team	Scoring information	Score	
Quarter	Time	Plays	Yards	TOP	Team	Scoring information	NDSU	USD
1st	6:35	11	80	6:14	USD	Travis Theis (#5) 6-yard touchdown run, Will Leyland (#15) kick good	0	7
2nd	12:44	7	73	4:13	USD	Travis Theis (#5) 14-yard touchdown run, Will Leyland (#15) kick good	0	14
2nd	2:39	6	66	2:57	NDSU	Braylon Henderson (#1) 23-yard touchdown reception from Cam Miller (#7), Griffin Crosa (#39) kick good	7	14
2nd	0:26	9	83	1:17	NDSU	CharMar Brown (#25) 3-yard touchdown run, Griffin Crosa (#39) kick good	14	14
3rd	10:21	10	51	4:39	USD	37-yard field goal by Will Leyland (#15)	14	17
3rd	4:48	10	80	5:29	NDSU	Cam Miller (#7) 2-yard touchdown run, Griffin Crosa (#39) kick good	21	17
4th	4:10	20	99	10:53	NDSU	CharMar Brown (#25) 1-yard touchdown run, Griffin Crosa (#39) kick good	28	17
4th	3:22	6	71	0:48	USD	Jack Martens (#15) 40-yard touchdown reception from Aidan Bouman (#2), 2-point pass incomplete	28	23
4th	0:12	6	58	1:04	USD	Javion Phelps (#8) 25-yard touchdown reception from Aidan Bouman (#2), 2-point pass incomplete	28	29
"TOP" = time of possession. For other American football terms, see Glossary of American football.							28	29

=== NCAA Division I playoffs ===
==== Abilene Christian (second round) ====
No. 15 Abilene Christian Wildcats (9–4) vs. No. 3 North Dakota State Bison (10–2)

Quarter	1	2	3	4	Total
No. 15 Wildcats	14	3	7	7	31
No. 3 Bison	3	17	21	10	51

at Fargodome, Fargo, ND

- Date: December 7, 2024
- Game time: 2:00 p.m. (CT)
- Game weather: Indoors; 70 °F (21 °C)
- Game attendance: 10,373
- Referee: Matt Overton
- TV announcers (ESPN+): Noah Reed (play-by-play), Craig Haubert (analyst)

Statistics	Abilene Christian	North Dakota State
First downs	16	19
Plays–yards	61–345	60–375
Rushes–yards	29–192	31–101
Passing yards	153	274
Passing: comp–att–int	20–32–2	20–29–1
Turnovers		
Time of possession	29:28	30:32

Team	Category	Player	Statistics
Abilene Christian	Passing	Maverick McIvor	20/32, 153 yds, TD, 2 INT
Abilene Christian	Rushing	Sam Hicks	16 car, 153 yds, 2 TD
Abilene Christian	Receiving	JJ Henry	7 rec, 70 yds, TD
North Dakota State	Passing	Cam Miller	20/29, 274 yds, 3 TD, INT
North Dakota State	Rushing	CharMar Brown	16 car, 58 yds
North Dakota State	Receiving	Bryce Lance	5 rec, 70 yds, TD

Scoring summary

Quarter	Time	Drive			Team	Scoring information	Score	
Quarter	Time	Plays	Yards	TOP	Team	Scoring information	ACU	NDSU
1st	8:52	12	72	6:08	NDSU	21-yard field goal by Griffin Crosa (#39)	0	3
1st	2:45	12	75	6:07	ACU	JJ Henry (#4) 13-yard touchdown reception from Maverick McIvor (#1), Ritse Vaes (#48) kick good	7	3
1st	0:00	1	90	0:04	ACU	Sam Hicks (#6) 90-yard touchdown run, Ritse Vaes (#48) kick good	14	3
2nd	10:35	4	1	0:57	ACU	29-yard field goal by Ritse Vaes (#48)	17	3
2nd	10:24				NDSU	Kickoff returned 100 yards for touchdown by Jackson Williams (#81), Griffin Crosa (#39) kick good	17	10
2nd	5:58	6	25	2:18	NDSU	37-yard field goal by Griffin Crosa (#39)	17	13
2nd	0:21	9	66	2:28	NDSU	RaJa Nelson (#3) 6-yard touchdown reception from Cam Miller (#7), Griffin Crosa (#39) kick good	17	20
3rd	10:38	4	28	1:47	NDSU	Cam Miller (#7) 1-yard touchdown run, Griffin Crosa (#39) kick good	17	27
3rd	6:08	4	28	1:47	NDSU	TK Marshall (#28) 30-yard touchdown reception from Cam Miller (#7), Griffin Crosa (#39) kick good	17	34
3rd	3:23	5	39	2:35	ACU	Sam Hicks (#6) 3-yard touchdown run, Ritse Vaes (#48) kick good	24	34
3rd	0:40	5	75	2:43	NDSU	Bryce Lance (#5) 36-yard touchdown reception from Cam Miller (#7), Griffin Crosa (#39) kick good	24	41
4th	11:11	10	75	4:29	ACU	Rovaughn Banks Jr. (#3) 2-yard touchdown run, Ritse Vaes (#48) kick good	31	41
4th	3:34	4	3	1:42	NDSU	24-yard field goal by Griffin Crosa (#39)	31	44
4th	3:25				NDSU	Interception returned 31 yards for touchdown by Logan Kopp (#31), Griffin Crosa (#39) kick good	31	51
"TOP" = time of possession. For other American football terms, see Glossary of American football.							31	51

==== Mercer (quarterfinal) ====
No. 8 Mercer Bears (11–2) vs. No. 3 North Dakota State Bison (11–2)

Quarter	1	2	3	4	Total
No. 8 Bears	7	0	0	0	7
No. 3 Bison	14	10	0	7	31

at Fargodome, Fargo, ND

- Date: December 14, 2024
- Game time: 2:30 p.m. (CT)
- Game weather: Indoors; 70 °F (21 °C)
- Game attendance: 10,353
- Referee: Kelly Holman
- TV announcers (ABC): Roy Philpott (play-by-play), Sam Acho (analyst), Lauren Sisler (sideline)

Statistics	Mercer	North Dakota State
First downs	8	20
Plays–yards	51–195	67–392
Rushes–yards	31–109	41–133
Passing yards	86	259
Passing: comp–att–int	10–20–1	16–26–2
Turnovers		
Time of possession	24:22	35:38

Team	Category	Player	Statistics
Mercer	Passing	Whitt Newbauer	8/18, 90 yds, TD, INT
Mercer	Rushing	Dwayne McGee	14 car, 59 yds
Mercer	Receiving	Kelin Parsons	1 rec, 38 yds, TD
North Dakota State	Passing	Cam Miller	16/25, 259 yds, 2 TD, 2 INT
North Dakota State	Rushing	CharMar Brown	11 car, 58 yds
North Dakota State	Receiving	Mekhi Collins	4 rec, 119 yds

Scoring summary

Quarter	Time	Drive			Team	Scoring information	Score	
Quarter	Time	Plays	Yards	TOP	Team	Scoring information	MER	NDSU
1st	12:03	4	50	1:57	NDSU	Bryce Lance (#5) 40-yard touchdown reception from Cam Miller (#7), Griffin Crosa (#39) kick good	0	7
1st	9:31	2	74	0:30	NDSU	Bryce Lance (#5) 4-yard touchdown reception from Cam Miller (#7), Griffin Crosa (#7) kick good	0	14
1st	7:01	5	73	2:25	MER	Kelin Parsons (#13) 38-yard touchdown reception from Whitt Newbauer (#8), Reice Griffith (#93) kick good	7	14
2nd	12:01	6	55	2:52	NDSU	Cam Miller (#7) 34-yard touchdown run, Griffin Crosa (#39) kick good	7	21
2nd	0:11	6	70	0:59	NDSU	38-yard field goal by Griffin Crosa (#39)	7	24
4th	1:57	11	54	5:59	NDSU	Barika Kpeenu (#8) 1-yard touchdown run, Griffin Crosa (#39) kick good	7	31
"TOP" = time of possession. For other American football terms, see Glossary of American football.							7	31

==== South Dakota State (semifinal) ====
No. 2 South Dakota State Jackrabbits (12–2) vs. No. 3 North Dakota State Bison (12–2)

Quarter	1	2	3	4	Total
No. 2 Jackrabbits	7	7	0	7	21
No. 3 Bison	7	7	0	14	28

at Fargodome, Fargo, ND

- Date: December 21, 2024
- Game time: 11:00 a.m. (CT)
- Game weather: Indoors; 70 °F (21 °C)
- Game attendance: 17,849
- Referee: Jeff Page
- TV announcers (ABC): Roy Philpott (play-by-play), Sam Acho (analyst), Taylor Davis (sideline)

Statistics	South Dakota State	North Dakota State
First downs	18	19
Plays–yards	66–333	56–329
Rushes–yards	40–129	37–150
Passing yards	204	179
Passing: comp–att–int	14–26–0	13–19–0
Turnovers	1	0
Time of possession	29:39	30:21

Team	Category	Player	Statistics
South Dakota State	Passing	Mark Gronowski	14/25, 204 yds, TD
South Dakota State	Rushing	Amar Johnson	15 car, 77 yds, TD
South Dakota State	Receiving	Griffin Wilde	4 rec, 66 yds
North Dakota State	Passing	Cam Miller	13/19, 179 yds, 3 TD
North Dakota State	Rushing	Cam Miller	15 car, 93 yds, TD
North Dakota State	Receiving	Bryce Lance	6 rec, 125 yds, 3 TD

Scoring summary

Quarter	Time	Drive			Team	Scoring information	Score	
Quarter	Time	Plays	Yards	TOP	Team	Scoring information	SDSU	NDSU
1st	9:34	7	80	3:41	NDSU	Bryce Lance (#5) 21-yard touchdown reception from Cam Miller (#7), Griffin Crosa (#39) kick good	0	7
1st	4:14	10	75	5:20	SDSU	Mark Gronowski (#11) 1-yard touchdown run, Hunter Dustman (#10) kick good	7	7
2nd	11:29	11	86	6:06	SDSU	Amar Johnson (#3) 39-yard touchdown run, Hunter Dustman (#10) kick good	14	7
2nd	1:57	7	23	3:22	NDSU	Cam Miller (#7) 2-yard touchdown run, Griffin Crosa (#39) kick good	14	14
4th	12:56	3	70	1:18	NDSU	Bryce Lance (#5) 47-yard touchdown reception from Cam Miller (#7), Griffin Crosa (#39) kick good	14	21
4th	8:20	10	90	4:30	SDSU	Grahm Goering (#12) 14-yard touchdown reception from Mark Gronowski (#11), Hunter Dustman (#10) kick good	21	21
4th	4:02	8	75	4:18	NDSU	Bryce Lance (#5) 10-yard touchdown reception from Cam Miller (#7), Griffin Crosa (#39) kick good	21	28
"TOP" = time of possession. For other American football terms, see Glossary of American football.							21	28

==== Montana State (national championship) ====
No. 3 North Dakota State Bison (13–2) vs. No. 1 Montana State Bobcats (15–0)

Quarter	1	2	3	4	Total
No. 3 Bison	14	7	0	14	35
No. 1 Bobcats	0	3	15	14	32

at Toyota Stadium, Frisco, TX

- Date: January 6, 2025
- Game time: 6:00 p.m. (CT)
- Game weather: Clear; 34 °F (1 °C); Wind: NW 7 mph
- Game attendance: 18,005
- Referee: Matt Overton
- TV announcers (ESPN): Dave Flemming (play-by-play), Brock Osweiler (analyst), Stormy Buonantony (sideline)

Statistics	North Dakota State	Montana State
First downs	18	19
Plays–yards	59–401	61–393
Rushes–yards	36–202	37–198
Passing yards	199	195
Passing: comp–att–int	19–23–0	13–24–0
Turnovers		
Time of possession	27:53	31:01

Team	Category	Player	Statistics
North Dakota State	Passing	Cam Miller	19/22, 199 yds, 2 TD
North Dakota State	Rushing	Cam Miller	18 car, 121 yds, 2 TD
North Dakota State	Receiving	Bryce Lance	9 rec, 107 yds, TD
Montana State	Passing	Tommy Mellott	13/24, 195 yds, 2 TD
Montana State	Rushing	Tommy Mellott	14 car, 135 yds, TD
Montana State	Receiving	Ryan Lonergan	1 rec, 53 yds

Scoring summary

Quarter	Time	Drive			Team	Scoring information	Score	
Quarter	Time	Plays	Yards	TOP	Team	Scoring information	NDSU	MTST
1st	7:55	12	75	7:05	NDSU	Cam Miller (#7) 2-yard touchdown run, Griffin Crosa (#39) kick good	7	0
1st	1:51	5	92	3:05	NDSU	Cam Miller (#7) 64-yard touchdown run, Griffin Crosa (#39) kick good	14	0
2nd	5:38	17	61	11:13	MTST	32-yard field goal by Myles Sansted (#39)	14	3
2nd	0:12	10	56	0:47	NDSU	Bryce Lance (#5) 1-yard touchdown reception from Cam Miller (#7), Griffin Crosa (#39) kick good	21	3
3rd	8:09	11	75	6:44	MTST	Scottre Humphrey (#22) 1-yard touchdown run, Myles Sansted (#39) kick good	21	10
3rd	4:03	2	58	0:57	MTST	Rohan Jones (#8) 5-yard touchdown reception from Tommy Mellott (#4), 2-point pass result	21	18
4th	14:18	8	75	4:45	NDSU	Joe Stoffel (#82) 1-yard touchdown reception from Cam Miller (#7), Griffin Crosa (#39) kick good	28	18
4th	11:25	5	75	2:53	MTST	Tommy Mellott (#4) 44-yard touchdown run, Myles Sansted (#39) kick good	28	25
4th	2:41	9	66	5:06	NDSU	CharMar Brown (#25) 3-yard touchdown run, Griffin Crosa (#39) kick good	35	25
4th	1:09	10	73	1:26	MTST	Taco Dowler (#14) 19-yard touchdown reception from Tommy Mellott (#4), Myles Sansted (#39) kick good	35	32
"TOP" = time of possession. For other American football terms, see Glossary of American football.							35	32

== Roster ==
2024 North Dakota State Bison football team roster
Players
Coaches
Offense

Pos.	#	Name	Class
WR	1	Braylon Henderson (C)	Sr
WR	2	Kellen Entz	So
WR	3	RaJa Nelson	Sr
RB	4	Owen Johnson	Jr
WR	5	Bryce Lance	Jr
WR	6	Tyler Terhark	Sr
QB	7	Cam Miller (C)	Sr
RB	8	Barika Kpeenu	Jr
QB	9	Cole Payton	Jr
QB	10	Trey Drake	Fr
QB	12	Nathan Hayes	So
WR	15	Mekhi Collins	So
WR	16	Silas Evans	Fr
WR	17	Isiah St. Romain	Fr
WR	19	Chris Harris	Jr
RB	25	CharMar Brown	Fr
RB	28	TK Marshall	Sr
RB	30	Kelly Watson	Fr
FB	33	Logan Hofstedt	Sr
RB	34	Jonathan Harvey	So
RB	36	McClain Miller	Fr
TE	40	Kaden Zenzen	So
TE	42	Reis Kessel	Fr
RB	42	Brady Wavrunek	Fr
TE	44	Luke Kokat	So
RB	45	Peder Haugo	Fr
FB	46	Truman Werremeyer	Jr
FB	47	Dylan Klancher	Fr
FB	49	Hunter Brozio	Sr
OL	57	Noah Stommes	Fr
C	59	Hayden Johnston	Sr
G	60	Isaac Zatechka	Jr
C	61	Gage Schmidt	Fr
G	62	Griffin Empey	Fr
C	63	Trent Fraley	So
G	66	Jack Liwienski	Fr
G	67	Kaden Chadwick	So
OL	68	Coy Okeson	Fr
G	69	Devin Lockerby	So
OT	70	Beau Johnson	Fr
OL	71	Nate Tastad	Fr
OT	72	Nate Schneckloth	Fr
OT	73	Mason Miller	Sr
G	74	Grey Zabel (C)	Sr
OL	75	Josh Magin	So
OT	76	Hunter Poncius	Sr
G	77	Austin Schultz	Fr
OT	78	Jake Rock	Sr
WR	80	John Gores	So
WR	81	Jackson Williams	Fr
TE	82	Joe Stoffel	Sr
WR	83	Cade Osterman	Fr
WR	84	Logan Conklin	Fr
WR	84	Jacob Kilzer	Fr
TE	85	Jett Zabel	Fr
WR	86	Cedric Wall	So
TE	87	Nate Forystek	So
TE	88	Carson Williams	Jr
TE	89	Finn Diggins	Jr

Defense

Pos.	#	Name	Class
LB	0	Marcus Gulley	Sr
S	4	Jaylin Crumby	Fr
CB	10	Marcus Sheppard	Sr
LB	11	Oscar Benson	Sr
CB	13	Najee Nelson	Fr
LB	14	Enock Sibomana	Jr
CB	17	Jailen Duffie	Fr
CB	18	Jaquise Alexander	So
CB	19	Will Rosenmeyer	Fr
S	20	Reese Sheldon	Fr
S	21	Noah Taylor	Fr
S	22	Hudson Artz	So
CB	23	Kegan Huber	So
CB	24	Anthony Chideme-Alfaro	Jr
LB	25	Ray James	Fr
S	26	Taylen Eady	Fr
S	27	Ryan Jones	Jr
S	28	Will Steil	Fr
S	29	Darius Givance	So
LB	32	Austin Altepeter	So
CB	34	Will Washington	Fr
S	35	Sam Jung	Sr
LB	35	Ryland Satter	Fr
LB	36	Nick Kubitz	Sr
S	37	Will Frattalone	Fr
S	39	Landon Meier	Fr
LB	43	Logan Kopp	Jr
LB	44	Brit Senftner	So
LB	47	Luke Weerts (C)	Sr
DE	49	Matthew Stenbroten	Fr
DT	50	Kody Huisman	Jr
LB	51	Donovan Woolen	Fr
LB	52	Nathaniel Staehling	So
DT	53	Eli Mostaert (C)	Sr
DE	54	Payton Bodine	Fr
DE	55	Kole Menz	Jr
DE	56	Loshiaka Roques	Sr
LB	57	Oliver Lucht	Fr
DT	58	Keenan Wilson	Fr
DT	64	Jaxon Duttenhefer	Jr
DT	65	Bryce Friday	Sr
DT	66	Jack Hansen	Fr
DE	69	Zach Vanderpool	Fr
DE	90	Wyatt Osterbauer	Fr
DT	91	Will Mostaert	Sr
DE	92	Kelton McCaslin	So
DE	93	Toby Anene	So
DT	94	Logan Larson	So
DE	95	Dylan Hendricks (C)	Sr
DE	96	Abraham Myers	Fr
DE	97	Victor Isele	Fr
DT	98	Brennan Palmer	Fr
DE	99	Hunter Zenzen	Jr

Special teams

Pos.	#	Name	Class
P	22	Aaron Bickerton	Jr
K	37	Drew Klein	So
K	38	Eli Ozick	Fr
K	39	Griffin Crosa	Sr
P	41	Kaedin Steindorf	Sr
LS	45	Grant Knodle	Fr
LS	48	Caleb Bowers	So

Head coach

- Tim Polasek (head coach)

Coordinators/assistant coaches

- Randy Hedberg (associate HC / quarterbacks)
- Jake Landry (offensive coordinator / running backs)
- Grant Olson (co-defensive coordinator / linebackers)
- Nick Goeser (co-defensive coordinator / defensive tackles)
- Joe Beschorner (special teams coordinator / tight ends / fullbacks)
- Dan Larson (running game coordinator / offensive line)
- Steve Crutchley (wide receivers)
- Will Johnson (cornerbacks)
- Devin Klieman (safeties)
- Carlton Littlejohn (defensive ends)
- Jack Plumb (offensive quality control)
- Brett Bostad (offensive analyst)
- Jared Taylor (defensive quality control)
- David Wienke (defensive anaylst)

Legend

- (C) Team captain
- (S) Suspended
- (I) Ineligible
- Injured
- Redshirt

Roster
Last update: December 9, 2024

== 2025 NFL draft ==
The following Bison players were selected in the 2025 NFL draft.

Player	Position	School	Draft round	Round pick	Overall pick	Team
Grey Zabel	OG	North Dakota State	1	18	18	Seattle Seahawks
Cam Miller	QB	North Dakota State	6	39	215	Las Vegas Raiders

== Rankings ==
Ranking movements Legend: ██ Increase in ranking ██ Decrease in ranking ( ) = First-place votes
	Week														
Poll	Pre	1	2	3	4	5	6	7	8	9	10	11	12	13	Final
STATS	2 (3)	2 (11)	2 (6)	2 (5)	2 (5)	2 (10)	2 (14)	2 (8)	1 (40)	1 (43)	1 (43)	1 (42)	1 (41)	3 (2)	1 (56)
Coaches	2	2 (5)	2 (2)	2 (1)	2 (1)	2 (3)	2 (3)	2 (2)	1 (24)	1 (24)	1 (24)	1 (24)	1 (23)	4	1 (16)
