= Solon Community School District =

Public school district in Solon, Iowa, United States

Coordinates: 41.805408°N 91.495612°W

Location
- Solon, Iowa Johnson and Linn counties United States
- Coordinates: 41.805408, -91.495612

District information
- Type: Local school district
- Grades: K-12
- Superintendent: Dr. Davis Eidahl
- Schools: 4
- Budget: $21,928,000 (2020-21)
- NCES District ID: 1926580

Students and staff
- Students: 1523 (2022-23)
- Teachers: 96.29 FTE
- Staff: 89.35 FTE
- Student–teacher ratio: 15.82
- Athletic conference: WaMaC Conference
- District mascot: Spartans
- Colors: Orange and Black

Other information
- Website: www.solon.k12.ia.us

The Solon Community School District is a rural public school district based in Solon, Iowa. The district is mainly in Johnson County, with a small area in Linn County, and serves the town of Solon and surrounding areas, including the area around Lake MacBride.

Dr. Davis Eidahl was hired as the superintendent in 2015.

The school's mascot is the Spartans. Their colors are orange and black.

== Schools ==
The district operates four schools, all in Solon:

- Lakeview Elementary School
- Solon Intermediate School
- Solon Middle School
- Solon High School

=== Solon High School ===
==== Athletics ====
The Spartans compete in the WaMaC Conference in the following sports:

- Baseball (boys)
  - 2-time State Champions - 2010, 2011
- Basketball (boys and girls)
  - 2009 Boys' Class 2A Basketball State Champions
  - Girls' 3-time Class 2A State Champions - 1994, 1997, 1998
- Bowling
- Cross Country (boys and girls)
- Football
  - 6-time State Champions - 1988, 2007, 2008, 2009, 2010, 2026
- Golf (boys and girls)
  - 1995 Girls' Class 1A State Champions
- Soccer (boys and girls)
- Softball (girls)
  - 3-time State Champions - 2003, 2007, 2015
- Swimming (boys and girls)
- Tennis (boys and girls)
- Track and Field (boys and girls)
  - Boys' 2-time Class 3A State Champions - 2010, 2014
- Volleyball (girls)
  - 2014 Class 3A State Champions
- Wrestling
  - Boys' 2017 Class 2A State Champions

== Notable alumni ==
- James Morris-(Class of 2010) former player for the New England Patriots
- Tyler Linderbaum (Class of 2018) is a center for the Las Vegas Raiders of the National Football League (NFL). He played college football for the Iowa Hawkeyes, and was selected in the first round of the 2022 NFL draft.
- Cam Miller (Class of 2020) former American college football quarterback for the North Dakota State Bison. Set the North Dakota State program record for most completions and passing yards in a single season and won the 2025 NCAA Division I Football Championship Game, and was named the game's most outstanding player. Current player for the Las Vegas Raiders.

== See also ==
- List of school districts in Iowa
- List of high schools in Iowa
