= Jerry Rice Award =

College football award in America

- Awarded for: Most outstanding freshman player in the NCAA Division I Football Championship Subdivision (FCS)
- Country: United States
- Presented by: Stats Perform

History
- First award: 2011
- Most recent: Mercer quarterback Braden Atkinson
- Website: www.fcs.football

The Jerry Rice Award is awarded annually in the United States to the most outstanding freshman player in the NCAA Division I Football Championship Subdivision (FCS) of college football as chosen by a nationwide panel of media and college sports information directors. The trophy is named in honor of former National Football League (NFL) wide receiver Jerry Rice, who played college football for the Mississippi Valley State Delta Devils.

== Winners ==
List of Jerry Rice Award winners
Year	Player	Pos.	School	Ref.
2011	Terrance West	RB	Towson	
2012	John Robertson	QB	Villanova	
2013	Cooper Kupp	WR	Eastern Washington	
2014	Chase Edmonds	RB	Fordham	
2015	Case Cookus	QB	Northern Arizona	
2016	A. J. Hines	RB	Duquesne	
2017	Bryson Armstrong	LB	Kennesaw State	
2018	Josh Davis	RB	Weber State	
2019	Trey Lance	QB	North Dakota State	
2020	Cam Ward	QB	Incarnate Word	
2021	Shedeur Sanders	QB	Jackson State	
2022	Gevani McCoy	QB	Idaho	
2023	Eli Gillman	RB	Montana	
2024	CharMar Brown	RB	North Dakota State	
2025	Braden Atkinson	QB	Mercer	
