= 2024 NCAA Division I Football Championship Game =

Postseason college football game

2024 NCAA Division I Football Championship
- FCS National Championship Game
Montana Grizzlies	South Dakota State Jackrabbits
(13–1)	(14–0)
Big Sky	Missouri Valley
3	23
Head coach: Bobby Hauck	Head coach: Jimmy Rogers
STATS / Seed; 2 / 2	STATS / Seed; 1 / 1
	1	2	3	4	Total
Montana	0	3	0	0	3
South Dakota State	7	0	16	0	23
- Date: January 7, 2024
- Season: 2023
- Stadium: Toyota Stadium
- Location: Frisco, Texas
- MVP: Mark Gronowski (QB, South Dakota State)
- Favorite: South Dakota State by 12.5
- Referee: Gary Leeper
- Attendance: 19,512

United States TV coverage
- Network: ABC, ESPN+
- Announcers: Roy Philpott (play-by-play), Roddy Jones (analyst), and Taylor McGregor (sideline)

International TV coverage
- Network: Canada: TSN+

The 2024 NCAA Division I Football Championship Game was a college football game played on January 7, 2024, at Toyota Stadium in Frisco, Texas. The game determined the national champion of NCAA Division I FCS for the 2023 season and featured the two finalists of the 24-team playoff bracket, which began on November 25, 2023. The Sunday game began at approximately 1:00 p.m. CST and was broadcast on ABC and ESPN+.

Defending champion South Dakota State repeated as FCS champions by defeating Montana, 23–3. It was the Jackrabbits' 29th consecutive victory.

== Teams ==
=== South Dakota State ===
South Dakota State played to an 11–0 regular-season record; their narrowest victory was a 20–16 win over Montana State on September 9. Seeded No. 1 in the FCS playoffs, the Jackrabbits received a first-round bye, then defeated Mercer, Villanova, and Albany, by a combined score of 123–12, to advance to the championship game.

South Dakota State previously appeared in two FCS championship games—they were champions of the 2022 season (2023 game) and runners-up of the 2020 season (2021 game).

=== Montana ===
Montana played to a 10–1 regular-season record; their only loss was to Northern Arizona in September. Seeded No. 2 in the FCS playoffs, the Grizzlies received a first-round bye, then defeated Delaware, Furman, and North Dakota State to advance to the championship game. Their latter two wins both went into overtime.

Montana previously appeared in seven FCS championship games, winning two and losing five; their most recent appearance was in 2009 (December), and they last won in 2001.

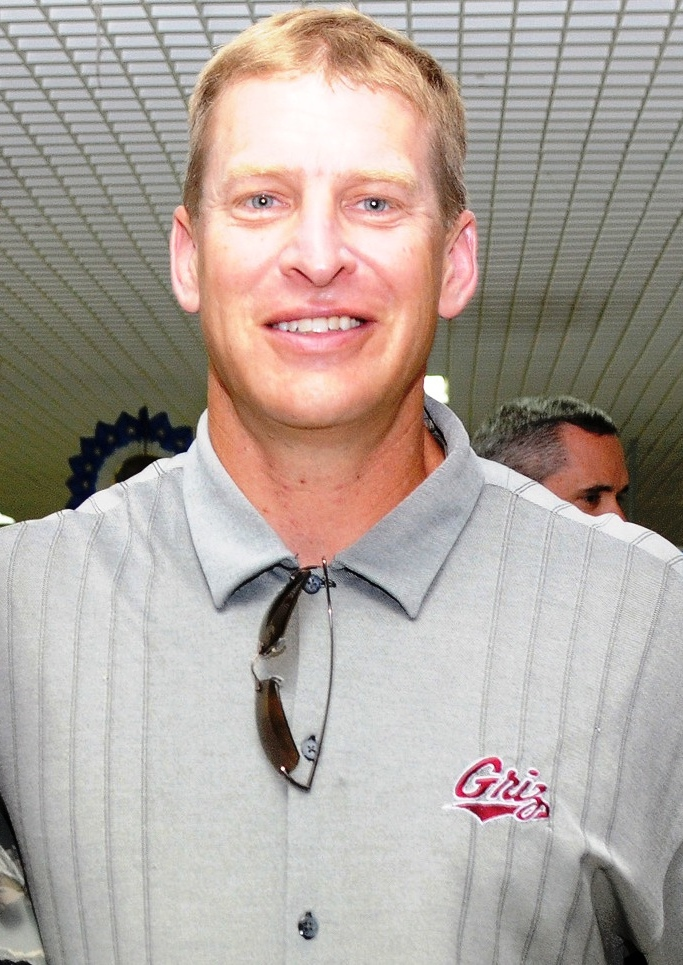
Montana head coach Bobby Hauck

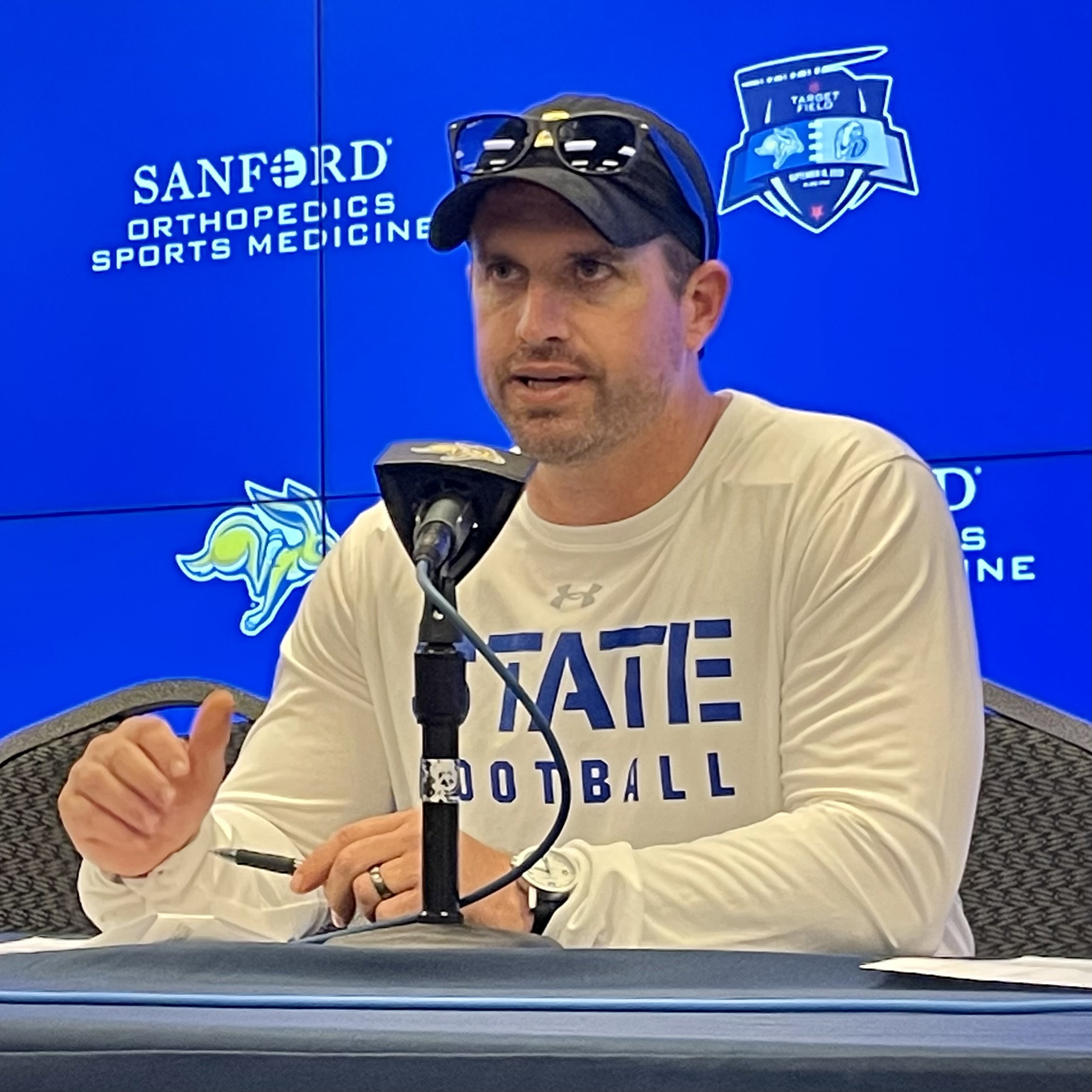
South Dakota State head coach Jimmy Rogers

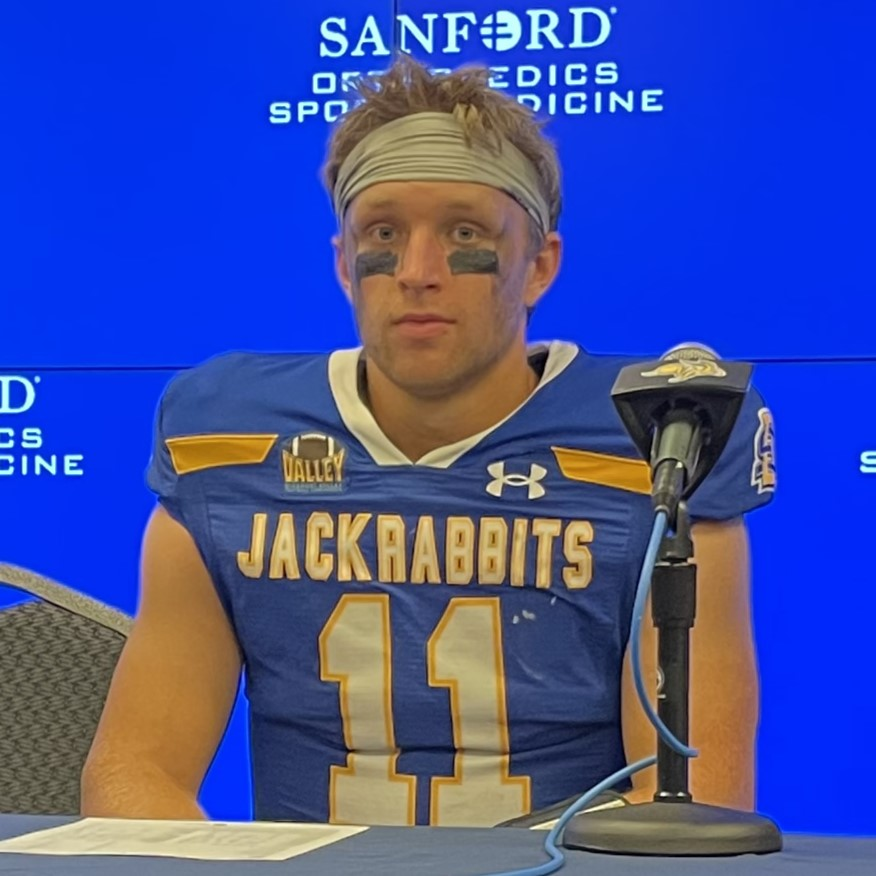
South Dakota State quarterback Mark Gronowski

== Game summary ==
2024 NCAA Division I Football Championship Game

Quarter	1	2	3	4	Total
No. 2 Montana	0	3	0	0	3
No. 1 South Dakota State	7	0	16	0	23

at Toyota Stadium • Frisco, Texas

- Date: January 7, 2024
- Game time: 1:00 p.m. CST
- Game weather: Sunny • Temperature: 57 °F (14 °C) • Wind: 16 mph (26 km/h) SE
- Game attendance: 19,512
- Referee: Gary Leeper
- TV: ABC, ESPN+
- Box score

== Statistics ==
Team statistical comparison
Statistic	Montana	South Dakota State
First downs	17	17
First downs rushing	6	8
First downs passing	10	8
First downs penalty	1	1
Third down efficiency	4/16	4/11
Fourth down efficiency	2/5	0/0
Total plays–net yards	76–259	55–363
Rushing attempts–net yards	30–47	34–188
Yards per rush	1.6	5.5
Yards passing	212	175
Pass completions–attempts (percent)	28–46 (61%)	13–21 (62%)
Interceptions thrown	1	1
Punt returns–total yards	1–6	1–0
Kickoff returns–total yards	5–114	1–23
Punts–average yardage	6–40.7	6–38.7
Fumbles–lost	2	1
Penalties–yards	6–34	6–35
Time of possession	29:50	30:10
