= Jake Landry =

American football coach

Current position
- Title: Senior Offensive Analyst
- Team: Penn State

Playing career
- 2006–2010: North Dakota
- Position: Quarterback

Coaching career (HC unless noted)
- 2011–2012: Minnesota–Duluth (GA)
- 2013: Northern Illinois (OI)
- 2014–2015: Northern Illinois (GA)
- 2016–2017: Wisconsin–La Crosse (OC/QB)
- 2018: Northern Illinois (RB)
- 2019–2020: Temple (OA)
- 2021: Temple (QB)
- 2022–2023: St. Thomas (OC/QB)
- 2024: North Dakota State (OC/QB)
- 2025: Iowa State (RB)
- 2026–present: Penn State (Sr. Offensive analyst)

Accomplishments and honors

Championships
- NCAA Division I FCS (2024)

Jake Landry is an American football coach who is the running backs coach for the Iowa State Cyclones football team. He played college football for the North Dakota Fighting Hawks.

== Playing career ==
Landry grew up in Grand Forks, North Dakota and attended Grand Forks Central High School. As a senior he completed 127 of 227 passes for 1,531 yards and 18 touchdowns and was named first team Class AAA all-state. Landry committed to play college football at North Dakota.

Landry redshirted his true freshman season at North Dakota. He was named the Fighting Sioux's starting quarterback going into his redshirt junior season.

== Coaching career ==
Landry began his coaching career as a graduate assistant at Minnesota Duluth in 2011. After two seasons with Minnesota Duluth he took an offensive intern position working with quarterbacks on Rod Carey's staff at Northern Illinois before taking a second graduate assistant position on the Huskies' staff. Landry became the offensive coordinator and quarterbacks coach at Wisconsin–La Crosse in 2016. He returned to Northern Illinois in 2018 as the Huskies' running backs coach.

Landry was hired as an offensive analyst at Temple after Carey was hired to coach the Owls. Landry was promoted to quarterbacks coach in 2021.

Landry was hired as the offensive coordinator and quarterbacks coach at St. Thomas in 2022. He was hired as the offensive coordinator at his alma mater North Dakota on January 18, 2024. However, he left after one week to take the same position at rival North Dakota State. After one season with the Bison, Landry left the program for the running backs coaching job at Iowa State on February 26, 2025.
