= CharMar Brown =

American football player (born 2005)

No. 6 – Miami Hurricanes
- Position: Running back
- Class: Redshirt Sophomore

Personal information
- Born: April 20, 2005 (age 21)
- Listed height: 5 ft 11 in (1.80 m)
- Listed weight: 214 lb (97 kg)

Career information
- High school: Creighton Preparatory (Omaha, Nebraska)
- College: North Dakota State (2023–2024); Miami (FL) (2025–present)

Awards and highlights
- FCS national champion (2024); Jerry Rice Award (2024); Second-team All-MVFC (2024); MVFC Freshman of the Year (2024)
- Stats at ESPN

CharMar "Marty" Brown (born April 20, 2005) is an American college football running back for the Miami Hurricanes. He previously played for the North Dakota State Bison.

== Early life ==
Brown grew up in Omaha, Nebraska and attended Creighton Preparatory School. He rushed for 1,408 yards and 17 touchdowns as a senior. Brown committed to play college football at North Dakota State.

== College career ==
Brown began his career at North Dakota State (NDSU). He redshirted his true freshman season. Brown became the Bison's starting running back during his redshirt freshman season and rushed for 1,181 yards and 15 touchdowns on 244 carries as NDSU won the 2024 FCS national championship. At the end of the regular season, he was named the Missouri Valley Football Conference (MVFC) Newcomer of the Year and Freshman of the Year, second team All-MVFC, and was named the winner of the Jerry Rice Award as the most outstanding freshman in the NCAA Division I Football Championship Subdivision. Following the 2025 Spring session of football with the Bison, Brown announced he would enter the NCAA transfer portal.

Brown transferred to Miami.

=== Statistics ===
College statistics
Year	Team	Games	Rushing					Receiving				
Year	Team	GP	Att	Yds	Avg	Lng	TD	Att	Yds	Avg	Lng	TD
2023	North Dakota State	0	(redshirt) Redshirted									
2024	North Dakota State	16	244	1,181	4.8	48	15	6	57	9.5	17	0
2025	Miami	15	122	474	3.9	23	7	20	138	6.9	22	2
Career		31	366	1,655	4.5	48	22	26	195	7.5	22	2
