= Cam Miller =

American football player (born 2001)

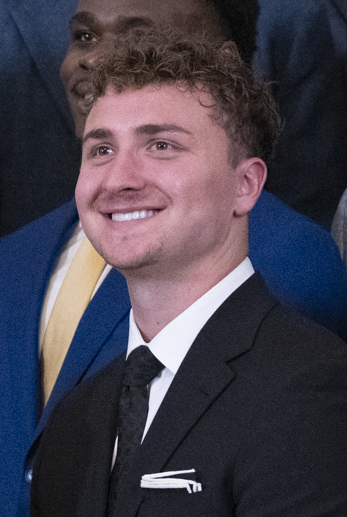
- Miller in 2025

No. 17 – Green Bay Packers
- Position: Quarterback
- Roster status: Practice squad

Personal information
- Born: June 18, 2001 (age 25); Solon, Iowa, U.S.
- Listed height: 6 ft 1 in (1.85 m)
- Listed weight: 215 lb (98 kg)

Career information
- High school: Solon (IA)
- College: North Dakota State (2020–2024)
- NFL draft: 2025: 6th round, 215th overall pick

Career history
- Las Vegas Raiders (2025)*; Miami Dolphins (2025); Green Bay Packers (2026–present)*
- * Offseason or practice squad member only

Awards and highlights
- 2× FCS national champion (2021, 2024); NCAA Division I Football Championship MVP (2024); First-team FCS All-American (2024); MVFC Offensive Player of the Year (2024); First-team All-MVFC (2024); Second-team All-MVFC (2023)
- Stats at Pro Football Reference

Cam Miller (born June 18, 2001) is an American professional football quarterback for the Green Bay Packers of the National Football League (NFL). He played college football for the North Dakota State Bison and was selected by the Las Vegas Raiders in the sixth round of the 2025 NFL draft.

== Early life ==
Born and raised in Solon, Iowa, Miller attended Solon High School. A multi-sport athlete, Miller participated in football, basketball, and baseball while at Solon. Beginning his varsity career as a sophomore, Miller finished his career at Solon passing for 5,894 yards and 79 touchdowns while adding 1,184 yards and 16 touchdowns on the ground. As a senior, he led his team to a 3A State Runner-Up finish and a 12-1 record. Miller committed to play college football at North Dakota State.

== College career ==
Miller played in eight games during his freshman season with the North Dakota State Bison and started both of the team's games in the FCS Playoffs. On the season, he completed 30 of 59 pass attempts for 363 yards and two touchdowns with three interceptions while also rushing for 176 yards and four touchdowns. Miller started the final eight games of the 2021 season, passing for 1,444 yards and 14 touchdowns and rushing 69 times for 280 yards and four touchdowns as the Bison won the 2022 NCAA Division I Football Championship Game.

As a junior, Miller started all 15 of NDSU's games and completed 160 of 243 pass attempts for 1,975 yards with 13 touchdown passes and five interceptions with 561 rushing yards and 15 rushing touchdowns. He passed for 2,688 yards and 19 touchdowns and rushed for 629 yards and 13 touchdowns as a senior. Miller used the extra year of eligibility granted to college athletes due to the COVID-19 pandemic and returned to NDSU for a fifth season in 2024.

In his final season of collegiate eligibility, Miller started all 16 of NDSU's games and completed 258 of 351 pass attempts for 3,251 yards with 33 touchdown pass and 4 interceptions, along with 631 rushing yards and 12 rushing touchdowns. Miller set the North Dakota State program record for most completions and passing yards in a single season, passing Carson Wentz's record set back in 2014. He led the Bison to another title, winning the 2025 NCAA Division I Football Championship Game, and was named the game's most outstanding player.

=== College statistics ===
Season	Team	Games			Passing								Rushing			
Season	Team	GP	GS	Record	Cmp	Att	Pct	Yds	Avg	TD	Int	Rtg	Att	Yds	Avg	TD
2020	NDSU	8	2	1–1	30	59	50.8	363	6.2	2	3	103.5	55	176	3.2	4
2021	NDSU	13	8	7–1	103	151	68.2	1,444	9.6	14	3	175.2	69	280	4.1	4
2022	NDSU	15	15	12–3	160	244	65.6	1,975	8.1	13	5	147.0	122	561	4.6	15
2023	NDSU	15	15	11–4	208	291	71.5	2,687	9.2	19	4	167.8	135	629	4.7	13
2024	NDSU	16	16	14–2	258	351	73.5	3,251	9.3	33	4	180.1	145	631	4.4	12
Career		67	56	45–11	759	1,096	69.3	9,720	8.9	81	19	164.7	526	2,277	4.3	48

== Professional career ==
Pre-draft measurables
Height	Weight	Arm length	Hand span	Wingspan	40-yard dash	10-yard split	20-yard split	20-yard shuttle	Three-cone drill	Vertical jump	Broad jump
6 ft 0 7/8 in (1.85 m)	215 lb (98 kg)	30 1/8 in (0.77 m)	9 5/8 in (0.24 m)	6 ft 1 1/8 in (1.86 m)	4.84 s	1.68 s	2.82 s	4.33 s	7.00 s	32.0 in (0.81 m)	9 ft 3 in (2.82 m)
All values from Pro Day

=== Las Vegas Raiders ===
Miller was selected by the Las Vegas Raiders with the 215th overall pick in the sixth round of the 2025 NFL draft and was endorsed by former NFL quarterback Tom Brady. He was waived on August 26 as part of final roster cuts and re-signed to the practice squad the next day.

=== Miami Dolphins ===
On January 1, 2026, Miller was signed by the Miami Dolphins off of the Raiders' practice squad. On August 30, Miller was waived by the Dolphins as a part of final roster cuts.

=== Green Bay Packers ===
On November 3, 2026, Miller signed with the Green Bay Packers' practice squad.
