= Jacardia Wright =

American football player (born 2000)

No. 31 – Seattle Seahawks
- Position: Running back
- Roster status: Practice squad/injured

Personal information
- Born: September 26, 2000 (age 26); Decatur, Illinois, U.S.
- Listed height: 6 ft 0 in (1.83 m)
- Listed weight: 218 lb (99 kg)

Career information
- High school: St. Teresa (Decatur, Illinois)
- College: Kansas State (2019–2021); Missouri State (2022–2024)
- NFL draft: 2025: undrafted

Career history
- Seattle Seahawks (2025–present)

Awards and highlights
- Super Bowl champion (LX); 2× Second-team All-MVFC (2023, 2024)

Career NFL statistics as of 2025
- Rushing yards: 20
- Stats at Pro Football Reference

Jacardia Wright (born September 26, 2000) is an American professional football running back for the Seattle Seahawks of the National Football League (NFL). He played college football for the Kansas State Wildcats and Missouri State Bears and was signed by the Seahawks as an undrafted free agent in 2025.

== Early life ==
Wright was born on September 26, 2000, in Decatur, Illinois. He attended St. Teresa High School in Decatur where he played football and was a top running back. He was a three-time Macon County Player of the Year and was also selected all-state in 2017 and 2018. As a senior, Wright ran for 2,609 yards and scored 55 touchdowns. He finished second in state history with 8,821 rushing yards and 133 touchdowns. He committed to play college football for the Kansas State Wildcats.

== College career ==
Wright appeared in three games and ran for 122 yards for Kansas State as a true freshman in 2019. He then ran six times for 17 yards during the 2020 season, and for 56 yards on 13 carries in 2021. He entered the NCAA transfer portal and transferred to the Missouri State Bears in 2022. In his first year with the Bears, Wright was named to the Missouri Valley Football Conference (MVFC) All-Newcomer team after running for 711 yards and nine touchdowns. In 2023, he was selected second-team All-MVFC after running for 696 yards and six touchdowns, along with recording 17 catches for 271 yards and a touchdown. Wright initially entered the transfer portal after the 2023 season, but declined name, image, and likeness (NIL) offers from larger schools to return to Missouri State for a final year in 2024. He ran for 824 yards and 14 touchdowns and caught 35 passes for 403 yards and two touchdowns in 2024, earning second-team All-MVFC honors.

== Professional career ==
Pre-draft measurables
| Height | Weight | Arm length | Hand span | Wingspan | 40-yard dash | 10-yard split | 20-yard split | 20-yard shuttle | Three-cone drill | Vertical jump | Broad jump | Bench press |
|---|---|---|---|---|---|---|---|---|---|---|---|---|
| 5 ft 11 3/4 in (1.82 m) | 218 lb (99 kg) | 33 1/8 in (0.84 m) | 8 in (0.20 m) | 6 ft 5 3/8 in (1.97 m) | 4.64 s | 1.69 s | 2.69 s | 4.44 s | 7.06 s | 35.5 in (0.90 m) | 10 ft 1 in (3.07 m) | 19 reps |
All values from Pro Day

After going unselected in the 2025 NFL draft, Wright signed with the Seattle Seahawks as an undrafted free agent. He ran for 147 yards and a touchdown during the preseason with the Seahawks. Wright was waived by Seattle on August 26, 2025, and was re-signed to the practice squad the next day. He was elevated to the active roster for the teams' Week 3 game against the New Orleans Saints.

On February 12, 2026, Wright signed a reserve/futures contract with the Seahawks. He was waived by Seattle on August 30 as a part of final roster cuts, and re-signed a day later to the practice squad.
