= Bryce Lance =

American football player (born 2002)

No. 18 – New Orleans Saints
- Position: Wide receiver
- Roster status: Active

Personal information
- Born: August 20, 2002 (age 24); Marshall, Minnesota, U.S.
- Listed height: 6 ft 3 in (1.91 m)
- Listed weight: 204 lb (93 kg)

Career information
- High school: Marshall Senior
- College: North Dakota State (2021–2025)
- NFL draft: 2026: 4th round, 136th overall pick

Career history
- New Orleans Saints (2026–present)

Awards and highlights
- FCS All-America first team (2025); 2× FCS national champion (2021, 2024); 2× First-team All-MVFC (2024, 2025)

Career NFL statistics as of Week 6, 2026
- Receptions: 9
- Receiving yards: 78
- Receiving touchdowns: 1
- Return yards: 47
- Stats at Pro Football Reference

Bryce Lance (born August 20, 2002) is an American professional football wide receiver for the New Orleans Saints of the National Football League (NFL). He played college football for the North Dakota State Bison and was selected by the Saints in the fourth round of the 2026 NFL draft.

== Early life ==
Lance grew up in Marshall, Minnesota, and attended Marshall Senior High School. He set school career records with 68 receptions and 1,766 receiving yards. Lance committed to play college football at North Dakota State University.

== College career ==
Lance redshirted his true freshman season at North Dakota State. He played primarily on special teams as a redshirt freshman and sophomore. Lance caught one pass for seven yards during his redshirt sophomore season. He was named a starting receiver for the Bison entering his redshirt junior year. Lance was named first-team All-Missouri Valley Football Conference at the end of the regular season.

=== College statistics ===
Year	Team	Games		Receiving				Rushing			
Year	Team	GP	GS	Rec	Yds	Avg	TD	Att	Yds	Avg	TD
2021	North Dakota State	0	0	Redshirt							
2022	North Dakota State	13	0	0	0	0.0	0	0	0	0.0	0
2023	North Dakota State	15	0	1	7	7.0	0	0	0	0.0	0
2024	North Dakota State	16	16	75	1,053	14.0	17	5	29	5.8	1
2025	North Dakota State	13	13	51	1,079	21.2	8	4	92	23.0	1
Career		57	29	127	2,139	16.8	25	9	121	13.4	2

== Professional career ==
Pre-draft measurables
Height	Weight	Arm length	Hand span	Wingspan	40-yard dash	10-yard split	20-yard split	20-yard shuttle	Three-cone drill	Vertical jump	Broad jump
6 ft 3 3/8 in (1.91 m)	204 lb (93 kg)	32 1/8 in (0.82 m)	9 1/4 in (0.23 m)	6 ft 7 1/2 in (2.02 m)	4.34 s	1.49 s	2.54 s	4.15 s	7.00 s	41.5 in (1.05 m)	11 ft 1 in (3.38 m)
All values from NFL Combine

Lance was selected by the New Orleans Saints in the fourth round with the 136th overall pick of the 2026 NFL draft. In Week 6, during a 34–27 victory over the New York Giants, Lance recorded his first career touchdown on a two–yard reception from Tyler Shough.

== Personal life ==
Lance's older brother, Trey, also played college football at North Dakota State and was the third overall selection in the 2021 NFL draft. His father, Carlton, played cornerback for the Saskatchewan Roughriders of the Canadian Football League (CFL) and the London Monarchs of the World League of American Football (WLAF).
