= 2024 FCS All-America college football team =

College football honors

The 2024 FCS College Football All-America Team includes those players of American college football who have been honored by various selector organizations as the best players at their respective positions, in the Football Championship Subdivision (FCS). The selector organizations award the "All-America" honor annually following the conclusion of the fall college football season.

The 2024 FCS College Football All-America Team is composed of the following College Football All-American first teams chosen by the following selector organizations: Associated Press (AP), American Football Coaches Association (AFCA), Stats Perform (STATS), Phil Steele, Sports Illustrated (SI) and Walter Camp Football Foundation (WCFF).

Currently, the NCAA does not recognizes any organization as an official selector for the FCS College Football All-America Team, so no player can be selected as a consensus selection, let alone a unanimous All-American.

== Offense ==
=== Quarterback ===
- Tommy Mellott, Montana State (AP, AFCA, Phil Steele, SI, STATS, WCFF)
- Cam Miller, North Dakota State (STATS, SI, AP-2)

=== Running back ===
- Targhee Lambson, Southern Utah (AP, AFCA, Phil Steele, SI, STATS, WCFF)
- Kayvon Britten, Tarleton State (AP, Phil Steele, SI, STATS, WCFF)
- Lan Larison, UC Davis (AP, AFCA)
- Roland Dempster, Stony Brook (AP-2)
- ShunDerrick Powell, Central Arkansas (AP-2)

=== Wide receiver ===
- Efton Chism III, Eastern Washington (AP, AFCA, Phil Steele, SI, STATS, WCFF)
- Darius Cooper, Tarleton State (AP, Phil Steele, SI, STATS, WCFF)
- Jalen Walthall, Incarnate Word (AP, AFCA, Phil Steele, SI, STATS)
- Javonnie Gibson, Arkansas–Pine Bluff (AFCA, AP-2)
- Ja'Seem Reed, San Diego (AP-2)
- Landon Ruggieri, Bryant (AP-2)

=== Tight end ===
- Chris Corbo, Dartmouth (AFCA, WCFF)
- Carter Runyon, Towson (Phil Steele, STATS)
- J. J. Galbreath, South Dakota (AP)
- Rohan Jones, Montana State (SI)
- Bryzai White, Northern Arizona (AP-2)

=== Offensive linemen ===
- Charles Grant, William & Mary (AP, AFCA, Phil Steele, SI, STATS, WCFF)
- Jackson Slater, Sacramento State (AP, AFCA, Phil Steele, SI, STATS, WCFF)
- Marcus Wehr, Montana State (AP, AFCA, Phil Steele, SI, STATS, WCFF)
- Grey Zabel, North Dakota State (AP, AFCA, Phil Steele, SI, STATS)
- Gus Miller, South Dakota State (AP, AFCA, SI, STATS, WCFF)
- Mason Miller, North Dakota State (AP, WCFF)
- Payton Collins, Eastern Kentucky (STATS)
- Bryce Henderson, South Dakota (SI)
- Carson Vinson, Alabama A&M (Phil Steele)
- Evan Beernsten, South Dakota State (AP-2)
- Joey Lombard, South Dakota (AP-2)
- Conner Moore, Montana State (AP-2)
- Evan Roussel, Nicholls (AP-2)
- Luke Smith, East Tennessee State (AP-2)

== Defense ==
=== Defensive linemen ===
- David Walker, Central Arkansas (AP, AFCA, Phil Steele, SI, STATS, WCFF)
- Jeremiah Grant, Richmond (AP, AFCA, SI, STATS, WCFF)
- Mi'Quise Grace, South Dakota (AP, Phil Steele, SI, STATS)
- Josiah Silver, New Hampshire (AP, AFCA, STATS, WCFF)
- Brody Grebe, Montana State (Phil Steele, WCFF, AP-2)
- Eli Mostaert, North Dakota State (SI, STATS, AP-2)
- Keyshawn James-Newby, Idaho (AFCA)
- Arias Nash, Mercer (SI)
- Ckelby Givens, Southern (AP-2)
- Elijah Williams, Morgan State (AP-2)

=== Linebacker ===
- Bryce Norman, Southeast Missouri State (AP, AFCA, Phil Steele, SI, STATS, WCFF)
- David Meyer, UC Davis (Phil Steele, SI, STATS, WCFF)
- A. J. Pena, Rhode Island (AP, Phil Steele, SI, STATS)
- Adam Bock, South Dakota State (AFCA, SI, AP-2)
- Caleb Francl, South Dakota State (Phil Steele, STATS)
- Gideon Lampron, Dayton (AP, WCFF)
- Brandon Tucker, East Texas A&M (AP, AFCA)
- Noah Martin, Samford (SI)
- Tye Niekamp, Illinois State (STATS)
- Blake Gotcher, Northwestern State (AP-2)
- Andrew Jones, Grambling State (AP-2)

=== Defensive backs ===
- Jalen Jones, William & Mary (AP, AFCA, Phil Steele, SI, STATS, WCFF)
- T. J. Moore, Mercer (AP, AFCA, Phil Steele, SI, STATS, WCFF)
- Rex Connors, UC Davis (Phil Steele, STATS, AP-2)
- Hayden McDonald, Columbia (SI, WCFF)
- Mike Smith Jr., Eastern Kentucky (AFCA, WCFF)
- Dalys Beanum, South Dakota State (STATS, AP-2)
- Myles Redding, Mercer (SI, AP-2)
- Dennis Shorter, South Dakota (SI, AP-2)
- Mason Chambers, Incarnate Word (STATS)
- Caleb Curtain, Elon (Phil Steele)
- Kenny Gallop, Howard (AP)
- Tucker Large, South Dakota State (SI)
- Tommy McCormick, Idaho (AFCA)
- Saiku White, Lafayette (AP)
- Jabril Hayes, Richmond (AP-2)
- Jordy Lowery, Western Carolina (AP-2)
- JaMichael McGoy, UT Martin (AP-2)

== Special teams ==
=== Placekicker ===
- Gabe Panikowski, Idaho State (AFCA, SI, WCFF, AP-2)
- D. C. Pippin, Southeast Missouri State (AP, STATS)
- Chris Campos, Stephen F. Austin (Phil Steele, AP-2)

=== Punter ===
- Jeff Yurk, Elon (AP, AFCA, SI, STATS, WCFF)
- Hunter Green, Northern Colorado (Phil Steele)
- James Platte, The Citadel (AP-2)

=== Return specialist / All-purpose ===
- Chandler Brayboy, Elon (AFCA, Phil Steele, STATS, AP-2)
- Junior Bergen, Montana (Phil Steele, SI, STATS)
- Lan Larison, UC Davis (AP, SI, STATS)
- Jermaine Corbett, Merrimack (SI, WCFF)
- Michael Wortham, Eastern Washington (SI)
- Sam Hicks, Abilene Christian (AP-2)

=== Long snapper ===
- Caden Bolz, Missouri State (Phil Steele, STATS)
- Tommy Sullivan, Montana State (AFCA)

== See also ==
- 2024 College Football All-America Team
- 2024 All-Big 12 Conference football team
- 2024 All-Big Ten Conference football team
- 2024 All-SEC football team
- 2024 All-ACC football team

== Sources ==
- Associated Press (AP):
- American Football Coaches Association (AFCA):
- Phil Steele:
- Stats Perform (STATS):
- Sports Illustrated (SI):
- Walter Camp Football Foundation (WCFF):
