= 2024 South Dakota State Jackrabbits football team =

American college football season

2024 South Dakota State Jackrabbits football

MVFC co-champion

NCAA Division I Semifinal, L 21–28 at North Dakota State
- Conference: Missouri Valley Football Conference

Ranking
- STATS: No. 3
- FCS Coaches: No. 3
- Record: 12–3 (7–1 MVFC)
- Head coach: Jimmy Rogers (2nd season)
- Offensive coordinator: Ryan Olson (1st season)
- Co-offensive coordinator: Danny Freund (1st season)
- Offensive scheme: Pro-style
- Defensive coordinator: Jesse Bobbit (2nd season)
- Base defense: 3–4
- Home stadium: Dana J. Dykhouse Stadium

2024 Missouri Valley Football Conference standings
	Conf.			Overall
Team	W		L	W		L
No. 1 North Dakota State +^	7	–	1	14	–	2
No. 3 South Dakota State +^	7	–	1	12	–	3
No. 4 South Dakota +^	7	–	1	11	–	3
Missouri State *	6	–	2	8	–	4
No. 11 Illinois State ^	6	–	2	10	–	4
Youngstown State	3	–	5	4	–	8
Indiana State	3	–	5	4	–	8
North Dakota	2	–	6	5	–	7
Southern Illinois	2	–	6	4	–	8
Northern Iowa	1	–	7	3	–	9
Murray State	0	–	8	1	–	11
+ – Conference co-champions; ^ – FCS playoff participant; * – Ineligible for 2024 FCS playoffs due to transition to the FBS; Rankings from STATS Poll

The 2024 South Dakota State Jackrabbits football team represented South Dakota State University during the 2024 NCAA Division I FCS football season, as a member of the Missouri Valley Football Conference. They were led by second-year head coach Jimmy Rogers and played their home games at Dana J. Dykhouse Stadium in Brookings, South Dakota.

== .Preseason ==
=== MVFC poll ===
The MVFC released it preseason prediction poll on July 22, 2024. The Jackrabbits were predicted to win the conference.

== Schedule ==
Date	Time	Opponent	Rank	Site	TV	Result	Attendance
August 31	1:00 p.m.	at No. 17 (FBS) Oklahoma State*	No. 1	Boone Pickens Stadium; Stillwater, OK	ESPN+	L 20–44	52,202
September 7	6:00 p.m.	No. 12 Incarnate Word*	No. 1	Dana J. Dykhouse Stadium; Brookings, SD	MidcoSN/ESPN+	W 45–24	19,321
September 14	6:00 p.m.	No. 14 (Div. II) Augustana (SD)*	No. 1	Dana J. Dykhouse Stadium; Brookings, SD	MidcoSN/ESPN+	W 24–3	19,376
September 21	6:00 p.m.	at Southeastern Louisiana*	No. 1	Strawberry Stadium; Hammond, LA	ESPN+	W 41–0	4,387
October 5	4:00 p.m.	at Northern Iowa	No. 1	UNI-Dome; Cedar Falls, IA		W 41–3	12,611
October 12	2:00 p.m.	Youngstown State	No. 1	Dana J. Dykhouse Stadium; Brookings, SD	MidcoSN/ESPN+	W 63–13	19,331
October 19	7:00 p.m.	at No. 2 North Dakota State	No. 1	Fargodome; Fargo, ND (Dakota Marker)	ESPN2	L 9–13	18,807
October 26	6:30 p.m.	No. 4 South Dakota	No. 3	Dana J. Dykhouse Stadium; Brookings, SD (rivalry)	ESPNU	W 20–17 ^{OT}	19,351
November 2	2:00 p.m.	Murray State	No. 3	Dana J. Dykhouse Stadium; Brookings, SD		W 52–6	16,376
November 9	1:00 p.m.	at No. 21 North Dakota	No. 3	Alerus Center; Grand Forks, ND		W 38–7	9,797
November 16	2:00 p.m.	Southern Illinois	No. 3	Dana J. Dykhouse Stadium; Brookings, SD		W 41–10	17,268
November 23	2:00 p.m.	at Missouri State	No. 3	Robert W. Plaster Stadium; Springfield, MO	ESPN+	W 45–9	7,142
December 7	1:00 p.m.	No. 13 Montana*	No. 3	Dana J. Dykhouse Stadium; Brookings, SD (NCAA Division I Second Round)	ESPN+	W 35–18	10,376
December 14	11:00 a.m.	No. 6 Incarnate Word*	No. 2	Dana J. Dykhouse Stadium; Brookings, SD (NCAA Division I Quarterfinal)	ESPN	W 55–14	8,640
December 21	11:00 a.m.	at No. 3 North Dakota State*	No. 2	Fargodome; Fargo, ND (NCAA Division I Semifinal)	ABC	L 21–28	17,849
*Non-conference game; Rankings from STATS Poll released prior to the game; All times are in Central time; Source:

== Game summaries ==
=== at No. 17 (FBS) Oklahoma State ===
No. 1 South Dakota State at No. 17 (FBS) Oklahoma State

Team	1	2	3	4	Total
No. 1 Jackrabbits	0	6	7	7	20
• No. 17 (FBS) Cowboys	10	7	21	6	44

- Date: August 31
- Location:
  Boone Pickens Stadium
  Stillwater, OK
- Game start: 1:00 p.m. CDT
- Elapsed time: 3 hours and 26 minutes
- Game attendance: 52,202
- Game weather: 79 °F (26 °C), Overcast
- Referee: Kevin Boitmann
- TV announcers (ESPN+): Shawn Kenney (play-by-play) and Taylor McHargue (analyst)
- Source: Box score

Scoring summary
1	8:15	OSU	Logan Ward 42-yard field goal (11 plays, 32 yards, 3:12)	OSU 3–0
1	2:03	OSU	Brennan Presley 6-yard pass from Alan Bowman (Logan Ward kick) (7 plays, 47 yards, 2:36)	OSU 10–0
2	12:15	SDSU	Hunter Dustman 31-yard field goal (8 plays, 58 yards, 4:40)	OSU 10–3
2	8:35	OSU	Ollie Gordon II 12-yard run (Logan Ward kick) (10 plays, 74 yards, 3:34)	OSU 17–3
2	3:52	SDSU	Hunter Dustman 48-yard field goal (8 plays, 45 yards, 4:43)	OSU 17–6
3	10:46	OSU	Ollie Gordon II 22-yard run (Logan Ward kick) (10 plays, 65 yards, 4:14)	OSU 24–6
3	9:10	SDSU	Graham Goering 21-yard pass from Mark Gronowski (Hunter Dustman kick) (3 plays, 75 yards, 1:36)	OSU 24–13
3	6:29	OSU	Rashod Owens 58-yard pass from Alan Bowman (Logan Ward kick) (6 plays, 81 yards, 2:33)	OSU 31–13
3	2:29	OSU	Ollie Gordon II 1-yard run (Logan Ward kick) (7 plays, 56 yards, 3:11)	OSU 38–13
4	13:50	OSU	Logan Ward 52-yard field goal (4 plays, 5 yards, 1:01)	OSU 41–13
4	12:10	SDSU	Griffin Wilde 60-yard pass from Mark Gronowski (Hunter Dustman kick) (3 plays, 78 yards, 1:37)	OSU 41–20
4	1:10	OSU	Logan Ward 25-yard field goal (4 plays, 7 yards, 1:56)	OSU 44–20

Statistics	SDSU	OSU
First downs	17	23
Total yards	388	394
Rushing yards	124	149
Passing yards	264	245
Turnovers	1	0
Time of possession	30:47	29:13

Team	Category	Player	Statistics
South Dakota State	Passing	Mark Gronowski	20/36, 264 yards, 2 TD, INT
South Dakota State	Rushing	Amar Johnson	9 carries, 73 yards
South Dakota State	Receiving	Griffin Wilde	7 receptions, 150 yards, TD
Oklahoma State	Passing	Alan Bowman	24/33, 245 yards, 2 TD
Oklahoma State	Rushing	Ollie Gordon II	28 carries, 126 yards, 3 TD
Oklahoma State	Receiving	De'Zhaun Stribling	6 receptions, 83 yards

=== No. 12 Incarnate Word ===
No. 12 Incarnate Word at No. 1 South Dakota State

Team	1	2	3	4	Total
No. 12 Cardinals	3	7	7	7	24
• No. 1 Jackrabbits	0	17	14	14	45

- Date: September 7
- Location:
  Dana J. Dykhouse Stadium
  Brookings, SD
- Game start: 6:00 p.m. CDT
- Elapsed time: 3 hours and 24 minutes
- Game attendance: 19,321
- Game weather: 73 °F (23 °C), Sunny, Wind W 5 mph (8.0 km/h)
- Referee: Jason Perkins
- TV announcers (ESPN+): Jay Elsen (play-by-play) & Kurtiss Riggs (analyst)
- Source: Box score

Scoring summary
1	6:06	UIW	Brack Peacock 37-yard field goal (9 plays, 61 yards, 3:55)	UIW 3–0
2	14:57	SDSU	Hunter Dustman 30-yard field goal (12 plays, 67 yards, 6:08)	TIED 3–3
2	11:11	SDSU	Greyton Gannon 41-yard pass from Mark Gronowski (Hunter Dustman kick) (5 plays, 73 yards, 1:48)	SDSU 10–3
2	6:51	UIW	Jalen Walthall 5-yard pass from Zach Calzada (Brack Peacock kick) (10 plays, 75 yards, 4:20)	TIED 10–10
2	3:32	SDSU	Graham Goering 22-yard pass from Mark Gronowski (Hunter Dustman kick) (8 plays, 77 yards, 3:17)	SDSU 17–10
3	13:11	UIW	Jalen Walthall 69-yard pass from Zach Calzada (Brack Peacock kick) (4 plays, 91 yards, 1:46)	TIED 17–17
3	7:13	SDSU	Griffin Wilde 11-yard pass from Mark Gronowski (Hunter Dustman kick) (11 plays, 69 yards, 5:56)	SDSU 24–17
3	3:58	SDSU	Amar Johnson 6-yard run (Hunter Dustman kick) (3 plays, 72 yards, 1:20)	SDSU 31–17
4	14:22	UIW	Roy Alexander 35-yard pass from Zach Calzada (Brack Peacock kick) (9 plays, 75 yards, 4:36)	SDSU 31–24
4	10:34	SDSU	Amar Johnson 3-yard run (Hunter Dustman kick) (8 plays, 59 yards, 3:45)	SDSU 38–24
4	7:47	SDSU	Griffin Wilde 25-yard pass from Mark Gronowski (Hunter Dustman kick) (4 plays, 42 yards, 1:39)	SDSU 45–24

Statistics	UIW	SDSU
First downs	20	31
Total yards	419	515
Rushing yards	68	230
Passing yards	351	285
Turnovers	1	1
Time of possession	24:43	35:17

Team	Category	Player	Statistics
Incarnate Word	Passing	Zach Calzada	31/39, 351 yards, 3 TD
Incarnate Word	Rushing	Zach Calzada	7 carries, 43 yards
Incarnate Word	Receiving	Jalen Walthall	7 receptions, 137 yards, 2 TD
South Dakota State	Passing	Mark Gronowski	21/32, 285 yards, 4 TD, INT
South Dakota State	Rushing	Amar Johnson	19 carries, 112 yards, 2 TD
South Dakota State	Receiving	Griffin Wilde	10 receptions, 106 yards, 2 TD

=== Augustana (South Dakota) ===
Augustana at No. 1 South Dakota State

Team	1	2	3	4	Total
Vikings	3	0	0	0	3
• No. 1 Jackrabbits	7	10	7	0	24

- Date: September 14
- Location:
  Dana J. Dykhouse Stadium
  Brookings, SD
- Game start: 6:00 p.m. CDT
- Game attendance: 19,376
- Source: Box score

Statistics	AUG	SDSU
First downs	12	22
Total yards	171	374
Rushing yards	24	233
Passing yards	147	141
Turnovers	1	3
Time of possession	28:16	31:44

Team	Category	Player	Statistics
Augustana	Passing	Evan Bearth	8/17, 92 yards
Augustana	Rushing	Rashad Lampkin	6 carries, 26 yards
Augustana	Receiving	Isaiah Huber	5 receptions, 53 yards
South Dakota State	Passing	Mark Gronowski	19/27, 142 yards, 2 INT
South Dakota State	Rushing	Amar Johnson	17 carries, 126 yards, 1 TD
South Dakota State	Receiving	Griffen Wilde	6 receptions, 47 yards

=== at Southeastern Louisiana ===
No. 1 South Dakota State at Southeastern Louisiana

Team	1	2	3	4	Total
• No. 1 Jackrabbits	7	13	14	7	41
Lions	0	0	0	0	0

- Date: September 21
- Location:
  Strawberry Stadium
  Hammond, LA
- Game start: 6:03pm CDT
- Elapsed time: 2:52
- Game attendance: 4,387
- Source: Box Score

Statistics	SDSU	SLU
First downs	18	13
Total yards	417	186
Rushing yards	341	94
Passing yards	76	92
Turnovers	1	2
Time of possession	25:52	34:08

Team	Category	Player	Statistics
South Dakota State	Passing	Mark Gronowski	7/17, 65 yards, 1 INT
South Dakota State	Rushing	Kirby Vorhees	5 carries, 179 yards, 3 TD
South Dakota State	Receiving	Amar Johnson	3 receptions, 37 yards
Southeastern Louisiana	Passing	Damon Sewart	9/20, 91 yards, 2 INT
Southeastern Louisiana	Rushing	Antonio Martin, Jr.	14 carries, 36 yards
Southeastern Louisiana	Receiving	Darius Lewis	5 receptions, 56 yards

=== at Northern Iowa ===
No. 1 South Dakota State at Northern Iowa

Team	1	2	3	4	Total
• No. 1 Jackrabbits	7	20	14	0	41
Panthers	0	3	0	0	3

- Date: October 5
- Location:
  UNI-Dome
  Cedar Falls, IA
- Game start: 4:03 p.m. CDT
- Elapsed time: 3:01
- Game attendance: 12,611
- Game weather: Indoors
- Referee: Jason Berg
- Source: Box score

Statistics	SDSU	UNI
First downs	17	16
Total yards	388	246
Rushing yards	139	66
Passing yards	249	180
Turnovers	0	4
Time of possession	30:43	29:17

Team	Category	Player	Statistics
South Dakota State	Passing	Mark Gronowski	16/22, 221 yards, 3 TD
South Dakota State	Rushing	Kirby Vorhees	8 carries, 45 yards
South Dakota State	Receiving	Angel Johnson	2 receptions, 76 yards, TD
Northern Iowa	Passing	Aidan Dunne	8/15, 113 yards, 2 INT
Northern Iowa	Rushing	Tye Edwards	12 carries, 62 yards
Northern Iowa	Receiving	Sergio Morancy	6 receptions, 73 yards

=== Youngstown State ===
Youngstown State at No. 1 South Dakota State

Team	1	2	3	4	Total
Penguins	3	7	0	3	13
• No. 1 Jackrabbits	21	14	14	14	63

- Date: October 12
- Location:
  Dana J. Dykhouse Stadium
  Brookings, SD
- Game start: 2:05 p.m. CDT
- Elapsed time: 3:00
- Game attendance: 19,331
- Game weather: 65 °F (18 °C), Cloudy, Wind E 4 mph (6.4 km/h)
- Referee: Tyler Downs
- Television network: ESPN+
- Source: Box score

Scoring summary
1	14:47	SDSU	Angel Johnson 99-yard kickoff (Hunter Dustman kick)	SDSU 7–0
1	11:22	SDSU	Chase Mason 38-yard run (Hunter Dustman kick) (4 plays, 75 yards, 1:57)	SDSU 14–0
1	4:32	YSU	Andrew Lastovka 39-yard field goal (13 plays, 54 yards, 6:50)	SDSU 14–3
1	0:34	SDSU	Mark Gronowski 1-yard run (Hunter Dustman kick) (9 plays, 79 yards, 3:52)	SDSU 21–3
2	11:27	SDSU	Amar Johnson 5-yard run (Hunter Dustman kick) (4 plays, 25 yards, 1:41)	SDSU 28–3
2	2:56	SDSU	Chase Mason 48-yard run (Hunter Dustman kick) (9 plays, 95 yards, 4:18)	SDSU 35–3
2	0:14	YSU	Beau Brungard 4-yard run (Andrew Lastovka kick) (8 plays, 91 yards, 2:38)	SDSU 35–10
3	8:12	SDSU	Gram Goering 45-yard pass from Mark Gronowski (Hunter Dustman kick) (5 plays, 90 yards, 2:35)	SDSU 42–10
3	0:49	SDSU	Griffin Wilde 19-yard pass from Mark Gronowski (Hunter Dustman kick) (2 plays, 93 yards, 0:39)	SDSU 49–10
4	10:16	SDSU	Marcus Preston 4-yard pass from Chase Mason (Jack Stevens kick) (5 plays, 80 yards, 3:05)	SDSU 56–10
4	3:08	YSU	Andrew Lastovka 31-yard field goal (12 plays, 53 yards, 7:08)	SDSU 56–13
4	2:02	SDSU	Davin Stoffel 14-yard pass from Jon Bell (Jack Stevens kick) (1 play, 14 yards, 0:04)	SDSU 63–13

Statistics	YSU	SDSU
First downs	20	21
Total yards	372	557
Rushing yards	183	404
Passing yards	189	153
Turnovers	2	0
Time of possession	40:14	19:46

Team	Category	Player	Statistics
Youngstown State	Passing	Beau Brungard	16/27, 169 yards, INT
Youngstown State	Rushing	Beau Brungard	11 carries, 59 yards, TD
Youngstown State	Receiving	Max Tomczak	6 receptions, 78 yards
South Dakota State	Passing	Mark Gronowski	8/13, 127 yards, 2 TD
South Dakota State	Rushing	Chase Mason	5 carries, 161 yards, 2 TD
South Dakota State	Receiving	Griffin Wilde	5 receptions, 62 yards, TD

=== at No. 2 North Dakota State ===
No. 1 South Dakota State at No. 2 North Dakota State
Dakota Marker

Team	1	2	3	4	Total
No. 1 Jackrabbits	0	9	0	0	9
• No. 2 Bison	0	7	0	6	13

- Date: October 19
- Location:
  Fargodome
  Fargo, ND
- Game start: 7:05 p.m. CDT
- Elapsed time: 3:16
- Game attendance: 18,807
- Game weather: 70 °F (21 °C), Indoors
- Referee: Jason Perkins
- TV announcers (ESPN2): Jay Alter (play-by-play) and Rocky Boiman (analyst)
- Source: Box score

Scoring summary
2	6:03	NDSU	RaJa Nelson 18-yard pass from Cam Miller (Griffin Crosa kick) (13 plays, 69 yards, 7:08)	NDSU 7–0
2	4:43	SDSU	Chase Mason 66-yard run (kick failed) (3 plays, 75 yards, 1:20)	NDSU 7–6
2	0:00	SDSU	Hunter Dustman 42-yard field goal (15 plays, 65 yards, 3:27)	SDSU 9–7
4	1:49	NDSU	RaJa Nelson 20-yard pass from Cam Miller (2-point pass failed) (10 plays, 92 yards, 5:25)	NDSU 13–9

Statistics	SDSU	NDSU
First downs	17	17
Total yards	333	275
Rushing yards	215	112
Passing yards	118	163
Turnovers	1	0
Time of possession	28:23	31:37

Team	Category	Player	Statistics
South Dakota State	Passing	Mark Gronowski	17/29, 118 yards, INT
South Dakota State	Rushing	Chase Mason	5 carries, 80 yards, TD
South Dakota State	Receiving	David Stoffel	2 receptions, 27 yards
North Dakota State	Passing	Cam Miller	20/27, 163 yards, 2 TD
North Dakota State	Rushing	Barika Kpeenu	6 carries, 35 yards
North Dakota State	Receiving	RaJa Nelson	4 receptions, 48 yards, 2 TD

=== No. 4 South Dakota ===
No. 4 South Dakota at No. 3 South Dakota State

Team	1	2	3	4	OT	Total
No. 4 Coyotes	7	0	0	7	3	17
• No. 3 Jackrabbits	7	7	0	0	6	20

- Date: October 26
- Location:
  Dana J. Dykhouse Stadium
  Brookings, SD
- Game start: 6:35 p.m. CDT
- Elapsed time: 3:33
- Game attendance: 19,351
- Game weather: 53 °F (12 °C), Clear, Wind S 15 mph (24 km/h)
- Referee: David Hergert
- TV announcers (ESPNU): Lowell Galindo (play-by-play) and Fozzy Whittaker (analyst)
- Source: Box score

Scoring summary
1	9:33	USD	Travis Theis 1-yard run (Will Leyland kick) (10 plays, 65 yards, 5:27)	USD 7–0
1	6:13	SDSU	Mark Gronowski 1-yard run (Hunter Dustman kick) (7 plays, 80 yards, 3:20)	TIED 7–7
2	4:53	SDSU	Amar Johnson 1-yard run (Hunter Dustman kick) (8 plays, 46 yards, 3:58)	SDSU 14–7
4	4:41	USD	Mi'Quise Grace 15-yard fumble recovery (Will Leyland kick)	TIED 14–14
4	0:00	USD	Will Leyland 40-yard field goal (4 plays, 2 yards, 0:00)	USD 17–14
OT	0:00	SDSU	Amar Johnson 3-yard run (8 plays, 25 yards, 0:00)	SDSU 20–17

Statistics	USD	SDSU
First downs	18	19
Total yards	275	329
Rushing yards	81	166
Passing yards	194	163
Turnovers	1	1
Time of possession	28:22	31:38

Team	Category	Player	Statistics
South Dakota	Passing	Aidan Bouman	20/32, 164 yards
South Dakota	Rushing	Travis Theis	15 carries, 78 yards, TD
South Dakota	Receiving	Jack Martens	3 receptions, 66 yards
South Dakota State	Passing	Mark Gronowski	20/27, 163 yards
South Dakota State	Rushing	Angel Johnson	14 carries, 81 yards
South Dakota State	Receiving	Griffin Wilde	5 receptions, 61 yards

=== Murray State ===
Murray State at No. 3 South Dakota State

Team	1	2	3	4	Total
Racers	3	3	0	0	6
• No. 3 Jackrabbits	14	24	14	0	52

- Date: November 2
- Location:
  Dana J. Dykhouse Stadium
  Brookings, SD
- Game start: 2:06 p.m. CDT
- Elapsed time: 3:08
- Game attendance: 16,376
- Game weather: 57 °F (14 °C), Sunny, Wind S 10 mph (16 km/h)
- Referee: Tyler Downs
- Source: Box score

Statistics	MSU	SDSU
First downs	10	31
Total yards	236	595
Rushing yards	117	343
Passing yards	119	2552
Turnovers	1	0
Time of possession	28:06	31:54

Team	Category	Player	Statistics
Murray State	Passing	Jayden Johannsen	14/18, 95 yards, INT
Murray State	Rushing	Jawaun Northington	12 carries, 39 yards
Murray State	Receiving	J'Kalon Carter	5 receptions, 54 yards
South Dakota State	Passing	Mark Gronowski	9/16, 170 yards, TD
South Dakota State	Rushing	Angel Johnson	7 carries, 132 yards, TD
South Dakota State	Receiving	Griffin Wilde	3 receptions, 78 yards

=== at No. 21 North Dakota ===
No. 3 South Dakota State at No. 21 North Dakota

Team	1	2	3	4	Total
• No. 3 Jackrabbits	3	28	7	0	38
No. 21 Fighting Hawks	7	0	0	0	7

- Date: November 9
- Location:
  Alerus Center
  Grand Forks, ND
- Game start: 1:06 p.m. CDT
- Elapsed time: 3:06
- Game attendance: 9,797
- Game weather: Indoors
- Referee: Aaron Adams
- Source: Box score

Statistics	SDSU	UND
First downs	22	14
Total yards	457	248
Rushing yards	264	124
Passing yards	193	124
Turnovers	0	2
Time of possession	33:27	26:33

Team	Category	Player	Statistics
South Dakota State	Passing	Mark Gronowski	11/19, 193 yards, 3 TD
South Dakota State	Rushing	Angel Johnson	13 carries, 100 yards, TD
South Dakota State	Receiving	Griffin Wilde	5 receptions, 140 yards, 3 TD
North Dakota	Passing	Simon Rofo	16/23, 124 yards, INT
North Dakota	Rushing	Isaiah Smith	9 carries, 87 yards, TD
North Dakota	Receiving	Bo Belquist	4 receptions, 40 yards

=== Southern Illinois ===
Southern Illinois at No. 3 South Dakota State

Team	1	2	3	4	Total
Salukis	0	0	7	3	10
• No. 3 Jackrabbits	3	28	10	0	41

- Date: November 16
- Location:
  Dana J. Dykhouse Stadium
  Brookings, SD
- Game start: 2:05 p.m. CDT
- Elapsed time: 2:54
- Game attendance: 17,268
- Game weather: 56 °F (13 °C), Sunny, Wind NW 20 mph (32 km/h)
- Referee: Gregory Gompf
- Source: Box score

Statistics	SIU	SDSU
First downs	12	24
Total yards	233	503
Rushing yards	34	288
Passing yards	199	215
Turnovers	2	0
Time of possession	21:39	38:21

Team	Category	Player	Statistics
Southern Illinois	Passing	Michael Lindauer	12/17, 145 yards, TD, INT
Southern Illinois	Rushing	Jerrian Parker Jr.	6 carries, 20 yards
Southern Illinois	Receiving	Allen Middleton	5 receptions, 94 yards, TD
South Dakota State	Passing	Mark Gronowski	11/17, 185 yards
South Dakota State	Rushing	Amar Johnson	14 carries, 157 yards, 2 TD
South Dakota State	Receiving	Griffin Wilde	3 receptions, 50 yards

=== at Missouri State ===
South Dakota State at Missouri State

Team	1	2	3	4	Total
• No. 3 Jackrabbits	7	17	14	7	45
Bears	0	9	0	0	9

- Date: November 23
- Location:
  Plaster Stadium
  Springfield, MO
- Game start: 2:02 p.m. CDT
- Elapsed time: 3:04
- Game attendance: 7,142
- Game weather: 59 °F (15 °C), Sunny, Wind S 7 mph (11 km/h)
- Referee: John Shay
- Television network: ESPN+
- Source: Box score

Statistics	SDSU	MSU
First downs	26	12
Total yards	447	220
Rushing yards	171	34
Passing yards	276	186
Turnovers	1	1
Time of possession	34:32	25:28

Team	Category	Player	Statistics
South Dakota State	Passing	Mark Gronowski	14/25, 258 yards, 2 TD
South Dakota State	Rushing	Amar Johnson	12 carries, 58 yards, 2 TD
South Dakota State	Receiving	Griffin Wilde	4 receptions, 139 yards, TD
Missouri State	Passing	Jacob Clark	14/31, 186 yards
Missouri State	Rushing	Jacardia Wright	9 carries, 16 yards
Missouri State	Receiving	DVontae Key	5 receptions, 70 yards

=== No. 13 Montana — NCAA Division I Second Round ===
No. 13 Montana at No. 3 South Dakota State
NCAA Division I Second Round

Team	1	2	3	4	Total
No. 13 Grizzlies	3	0	0	15	18
• No. 3 Jackrabbits	7	14	0	14	35

- Date: December 7
- Location:
  Dana J. Dykhouse Stadium
  Brookings, SD
- Game start: 1:02 p.m. CDT
- Elapsed time: 2:59
- Game attendance: 10,376
- Game weather: 48 °F (9 °C), Sunny, Wind NE 15 mph (24 km/h)
- Referee: James Brookhart
- TV announcers (ESPN+): Lowell Galindo (play-by-play) and Fozzy Whittaker (analyst)
- Source: Box score

Statistics	MONT	SDSU
First downs	16	19
Total yards	306	400
Rushing yards	75	223
Passing yards	231	177
Turnovers	2	1
Time of possession	26:04	33:56

Team	Category	Player	Statistics
Montana	Passing	Keali'i Ah Yat	19/32, 231 yards, 2 TD, 2 INT
Montana	Rushing	Keali'i Ah Yat	9 carries, 25 yards
Montana	Receiving	Keelan White	5 receptions, 68 yards, TD
South Dakota State	Passing	Mark Gronowski	12/16, 151 yards, 2 TD
South Dakota State	Rushing	Amar Johnson	16 carries, 103 yards
South Dakota State	Receiving	Griffin Wilde	7 receptions, 114 yards, 2 TD

=== No. 6 Incarnate Word — NCAA Division I Quarterfinal ===
No. 6 Incarnate Word at No. 2 South Dakota State
NCAA Division I Quarterfinal

Team	1	2	3	4	Total
No. 6 Cardinals	0	0	14	0	14
• No. 2 Jackrabbits	7	24	7	17	55

- Date: December 14
- Location:
  Dana J. Dykhouse Stadium
  Brookings, SD
- Game start: 11:02 a.m. CDT
- Elapsed time: 3:14
- Game attendance: 8,640
- Game weather: 26 °F (−3 °C), Cloudy, Wind SE 10 mph (16 km/h)
- Referee: Paul Matt Overton
- TV announcers (ESPN): Jay Alter (play-by-play), Rocky Boiman (analyst) and Marilyn Payne (sideline)
- Source: Box score

Scoring summary
1	4:30	SDSU	Griffin Wilde 35-yard pass from Mark Gronowski (Hunter Dustman kick) (7 plays, 76 yards, 3:30)	SDSU 7–0
2	9:59	SDSU	Griffin Wilde 35-yard pass from Mark Gronowski (Hunter Dustman kick) (6 plays, 92 yards, 3:30)	SDSU 14–0
2	6:03	SDSU	Mark Gronowski 3-yard run (Hunter Dustman kick) (5 plays, 15 yards, 3:20)	SDSU 21–0
2	1:02	SDSU	Mark Gronowski 1-yard run (Hunter Dustman kick) (5 plays, 52 yards, 2:02)	SDSU 28–0
2	0:01	SDSU	Hunter Dustman 36-yard field goal (6 plays, 12 yards, 0:28)	SDSU 31–0
3	13:30	SDSU	David Alpers 59-yard pass from Mark Gronowski (Hunter Dustman kick) (3 plays, 67 yards, 1:30)	SDSU 38–0
3	7:59	UIW	Roy Alexander 3-yard pass from Zach Calzada (Brack Peacock kick) (15 plays, 69 yards, 5:31)	SDSU 38–7
3	3:38	UIW	Zach Calzada 1-yard run (Brack Peacock kick) (8 plays, 67 yards, 2:41)	SDSU 38–14
4	13:21	SDSU	Hunter Dustman 30-yard field goal (4 plays, 1 yard, 0:57)	SDSU 41–14
4	10:55	SDSU	Kirby Vorhees 1-yard run (Hunter Dustman kick) (3 plays, 40 yards, 1:29)	SDSU 48–14
4	6:32	SDSU	Brenden Begeman 1-yard run (Hunter Dustman kick) (5 plays, 34 yards, 3:07)	SDSU 55–14

Statistics	UIW	SDSU
First downs	19	19
Total yards	345	476
Rushing yards	87	273
Passing yards	258	203
Turnovers	2	2
Time of possession	27:12	32:48

Team	Category	Player	Statistics
Incarnate Word	Passing	Zach Calzada	37/51, 258 yards, TD, INT
Incarnate Word	Rushing	Lontrell Turner	6 carries, 41 yards
Incarnate Word	Receiving	Roy Alexander	13 receptions, 92 yards, TD
South Dakota State	Passing	Mark Gronowski	7/16, 174 yards, 3 TD, INT
South Dakota State	Rushing	Amar Johnson	18 carries, 132 yards
South Dakota State	Receiving	Griffin Wilde	3 receptions, 67 yards, 2 TD

=== at No. 3 North Dakota State — NCAA Division I Semifinal ===
No. 2 South Dakota State at No. 3 North Dakota State
NCAA Division I Semifinal

Team	1	2	3	4	Total
No. 2 Jackrabbits	7	7	0	7	21
• No. 3 Bison	7	7	0	14	28

- Date: December 21
- Location:
  Fargodome
  Fargo, ND
- Game start: 11:06 a.m. CDT
- Elapsed time: 3:03
- Game attendance: 17,849
- Game weather: 70 °F (21 °C), Indoors
- Referee: Jeff Page
- TV announcers (ABC): Roy Philpott (play-by-play), Sam Acho (analyst) and Taylor Davis (sideline)
- Source: Box score

Scoring summary
1	9:34	NDSU	Bryce Lance 21-yard pass from Cam Miller (Griffin Crosa kick) (7 plays, 80 yards, 3:41)	NDSU 7–0
1	4:14	SDSU	Mark Gronowski 1-yard run (Hunter Dustman kick) (10 plays, 75 yards, 5:20)	TIED 7–7
2	11:29	SDSU	Amar Johnson 39-yard run (Hunter Dustman kick) (11 plays, 86 yards, 6:06)	SDSU 14–7
2	1:57	NDSU	Cam Miller 2-yard run (Griffin Crosa kick) (7 plays, 23 yards, 3:22)	TIED 14–14
4	12:56	NDSU	Bryce Lance 47-yard pass from Cam Miller (Griffin Crosa kick) (3 plays, 70 yards, 1:18)	NDSU 21–14
4	8:20	SDSU	Grahm Goering 14-yard pass from Mark Gronowski (Hunter Dustman kick) (10 plays, 90 yards, 4:30)	TIED 21–21
4	4:02	NDSU	Bryce Lance 10-yard pass from Cam Miller (Griffin Crosa kick) (8 plays, 75 yards, 4:18)	NDSU 28–21

Statistics	SDSU	NDSU
First downs	18	19
Total yards	333	329
Rushing yards	129	150
Passing yards	204	179
Turnovers	1	0
Time of possession	29:39	30:21

Team	Category	Player	Statistics
South Dakota State	Passing	Mark Gronowski	14/25, 204 yards, TD
South Dakota State	Rushing	Amar Johnson	15 carries, 77 yards, TD
South Dakota State	Receiving	Griffin Wilde	4 receptions, 66 yards
North Dakota State	Passing	Cam Miller	13/19, 179 yards, 3 TD
North Dakota State	Rushing	Cam Miller	15 carries, 93 yards, TD
North Dakota State	Receiving	Bryce Lance	6 receptions, 125 yards, 3 TD

== Roster ==
2024 South Dakota State Jackrabbits football team roster
Players
Coaches
Offense

Pos.	#	Name	Class
QB	13	Jack Amer	Fr
QB	5	Jon Bell	Jr
QB	11	Mark Gronowski	Sr
QB	16	Jack Henry	Fr
QB	7	Chase Mason	Jr
QB	17	Jack Thue	Fr
RB	24	Brenden Begeman	Fr
RB	3	Amar Johnson	Sr
RB	21	Angel Johnson	Jr
RB	35	Quinton Renfro	Fr
RB	20	Kirby Vorhees	Fr
RB	34	Maxwell Woods	Fr
TE	83	David Alpers	So
TE	49	Beau Baker	Fr
TE	44	Kevin Brenner	Sr
TE	40	Brayden Delahoyde	Fr
TE	88	Greyton Gannon	So
TE	43	Andrew Gustad	So
TE	46	Blake Leiferman	Fr
TE	81	Joey Neumann	Fr
TE	87	Davin Stoffel	Fr
OL	68	Nick Bakken	Fr
OL	61	Evan Beerntsen	Sr
OL	62	Kenyon Big Bow	Fr
OL	69	Quinten Christensen	So
OL	76	Sam Hagen	Jr
OL	78	Marcus Hicks	Sr
OL	73	Caden Hotz	Fr
OL	58	Jackson Kerstin	Fr
OL	79	Thomas Martian	Fr
OL	50	Gus Miller	Sr
OL	67	Ian Mutchler	Fr
OL	77	William Paepke	Fr
OL	63	Kyan Rauk	Fr
OL	72	Hayden Venenga	Fr
OL	64	Ethan Vibert	Sr
OL	74	Shane Willenbring	Fr
WR	15	Devon Cole Jr.	Sr
WR	8	Sammy Dresie	Fr
WR	6	Elijah Ervin	Jr
WR	12	Grahm Goering	Jr
WR	86	Patrick Hoffmann	Sr
WR	36	Dane Miller	So
WR	82	Ky Oday Jr.	So
WR	80	Lofton O'Groske	Fr
WR	4	Kentrell Prejean	Fr
WR	2	Marcus Preston	Sr
WR	84	Joe Randle	Fr
WR	85	Joe Roll	Fr
WR	19	Jack Smith	Fr
WR	18	Griffin Wilde	So

Defense

Pos.	#	Name	Class
LB	32	Adam Bock	Sr
LB	9	Caleb Francl	Sr
LB	47	Kytan Fyfe	So
LB	40	Aaron Kusler	Sr
LB	33	Bryce Johnson	So
LB	0	Daeton Mcgaughy	Sr
LB	46	Cullen McShane	So
LB	15	Hudson Metcalf	Sr
LB	48	Jack Nash	Fr
LB	11	Joe Ollman	So
LB	42	Anthony Palano	Fr
LB	37	Carsten Reynolds	Fr
LB	45	Boden Schiller	Fr
LB	29	Graham Spalding	Sr
LB	28	Chase Van Tol	Fr
LB	53	Joseph Vieth	Fr
DE	90	Randy Keumogne	Sr
DE	97	Reis Kirschenman	Fr
DE	56	Fernando Lecuona	Fr
DE	8	Blake Peterson	GS
DE	99	Dawson Ripperda	So
DE	66	Rhett Schaefer	Fr
DE	57	Levi Vanden Bos	Jr
DE	92	Sam Watts	Fr
DE	50	Nick Wells	Fr
DE	95	Zac Wilson	Sr
DT	93	Max Baloun	Sr
DT	71	Max Chapman	Fr
DT	94	Kobe Clayborne	Jr
DT	52	Jarod DePriest	Sr
DT	51	Logan Green	So
DT	96	Bryce Hawthorne	Fr
DT	98	Mac Muller	Fr
DT	91	Jace Sifore	So
DT	55	Aaron Wolfcale-Holsten	Jr
CB	4	Steven Arrell	Sr
CB	7	Dalys Beanum	Sr
CB	30	Cody Cotton	Jr
CB	13	Aydan Dautermann	Jr
CB	17	Abe Hoskins III	Sr
CB	22	Colby Humphrey	Sr
CB	6	Jalen B. Lee	So
CB	16	Noah St-Juste	Fr
CB	20	Myles Taylor	Jr
S	23	Matthew Durrance	Jr
S	14	Colby Huerter	Sr
S	3	Dontay Johnson	So
S	1	Tucker Large	Jr
S	25	Cale Reeder	Sr
S	31	Trey Ridley	Fr
S	38	Max Stanard	Fr
S	27	Noah Thompson	So
S	26	Kolten Tilford	Fr

Special teams

Pos.	#	Name	Class
PK, P	10	Hunter Dustman	Sr
PK, P	96	Jackson Isakson	Fr
PK	99	Jack Stevens	Fr
P	41	Max Pelham	Jr
LS	37	Kaydon Olivia	Jr
LS	59	Carson Strohbeen	Fr

Head coach

- Jimmy Rogers (2nd year)

Coordinators/assistant coaches

- Ryan Olson – Offensive coordinator/offensive line
- Danny Freund – Co-Offensive coordinator/quarterbacks
- Jesse Bobbit – Defensive coordinator/linebackers
- Pat Cashmore – Special teams coordinator
- Chris Meyers – Recruiting coordinator/tight ends
- Mike Banks – Cornerbacks
- Jalon Bibbs – Defensive line
- Jake Menage – Wide receivers
- Pete Menage – Safeties
- Robbie Rouse – Running backs
- Jonathan Shaeffer – Director of Football Operations
- Matt Jacobs – Director of strength & conditioning
- Kyle Saddler – Offensive quality control
- Brayden Gage – Special teams quality control/video coordinator

Legend

- (C) Team captain
- (S) Suspended
- (I) Ineligible
- Injured
- Redshirt

Roster

== Rankings ==
Ranking movements Legend: ██ Increase in ranking ██ Decrease in ranking ( ) = First-place votes
	Week														
Poll	Pre	1	2	3	4	5	6	7	8	9	10	11	12	13	Final
STATS FCS	1 (52)	1 (36)	1 (44)	1 (41)	1 (40)	1 (38)	1 (36)	1 (38)	3	3	3	3	3	2 (1)	3
Coaches	1 (25)	1 (17)	1 (22)	1 (22)	1 (22)	1 (21)	1 (21)	1 (21)	3	3	3	3	3	2 (2)	3
