= 2024 Incarnate Word Cardinals football team =

American college football season

2024 Incarnate Word Cardinals football

Southland champion

NCAA Division I Quarterfinals, L 14–55 at South Dakota State
- Conference: Southland Conference

Ranking
- STATS: No. 6
- FCS Coaches: No. 6
- Record: 11–3 (7–0 Southland)
- Head coach: Clint Killough (2nd season)
- Offensive coordinator: Conner McQueen (2nd season)
- Offensive scheme: Spread
- Defensive coordinator: Jim Gush (2nd season)
- Base defense: 4–2–5
- Home stadium: Gayle and Tom Benson Stadium

2024 Southland Conference football standings
	Conf.			Overall
Team	W		L	W		L
No. 6 Incarnate Word $^	7	–	0	11	–	3
Southeastern Louisiana	6	–	1	7	–	5
Stephen F. Austin	4	–	3	7	–	5
Lamar	4	–	3	7	–	5
McNeese	3	–	4	6	–	6
Houston Christian	3	–	4	5	–	7
East Texas A&M*	2	–	4	3	–	9
Nicholls	2	–	5	4	–	8
Northwestern State	0	–	7	0	–	12
$ – Conference champion; ^ – FCS playoff participant; * – East Texas A&M was ineligible for FCS postseason play due to transition from NCAA Division II.; Rankings from STATS Poll

The 2024 Incarnate Word Cardinals football team represented the University of the Incarnate Word (UIW) as a member of the Southland Conference during the 2024 NCAA Division I FCS football season. The Cardinals played their home games at Gayle and Tom Benson Stadium in San Antonio, Texas. They were led by second-year head coach Clint Killough.

== Preseason ==
=== Preseason poll ===
The Southland Conference released their preseason poll on July 22, 2024. The Cardinals were picked to finish second in the conference and received eight first-place votes.

=== Preseason All–Southland Teams ===
The Southland Conference announced the 2024 preseason all-conference football team selections on July 22, 2024. UIW had a total of 10 players selected.

Offense

1st Team

- Zach Calzada – Quarterback, RS-GR

2nd Team

- Mason Pierce – Wide receiver, RS-SR
- Rasheed Jackson – Offensive lineman, SO

Defense

1st Team

- Tylan Foster – Linebacker, SR
- Ronald Wilson – Defensive back, SR
- Dekaylon Taylor – Kick returner, JR

2nd Team

- Marcus Brown – Defensive lineman, SR
- Chase Carter – Defensive lineman, SR
- Mister Williams – Linebacker, RS-JR
- Mason Chambers – Defensive back, SR
- Dekaylon Taylor – Punt returner, JR

== Schedule ==
Date	Time	Opponent	Rank	Site	TV	Result	Attendance
August 31	6:00 p.m.	Northern Colorado*	No. 14	Gayle and Tom Benson Stadium; San Antonio, TX	ESPN+	W 28–7	2,257
September 7	6:00 p.m.	at No. 1 South Dakota State*	No. 12	Dana J. Dykhouse Stadium; Brookings, SD	ESPN+	L 24–45	19,321
September 14	6:00 p.m.	at No. 9 Southern Illinois*	No. 12	Saluki Stadium; Carbondale, IL	ESPN+	L 28–35	7,879
September 21	6:00 p.m.	Northern Arizona*	No. 15	Gayle and Tom Benson Stadium; San Antonio, TX	ESPN+	W 38–14	1,413
October 5	6:00 p.m.	Prairie View A&M*	No. 15	Gayle and Tom Benson Stadium; San Antonio, TX	ESPN+	W 52–28	2,003
October 12	6:00 p.m.	Nicholls	No. 15	Gayle and Tom Benson Stadium; San Antonio, TX	ESPN+	W 55–10	1,801
October 19	4:00 p.m.	McNeese	No. 14	Gayle and Tom Benson Stadium; San Antonio, TX	ESPN+	W 30–17	1,634
October 26	6:00 p.m.	at Southeastern Louisiana	No. 10	Strawberry Stadium; Hammond, LA	ESPN+	W 34–31	3,116
November 2	2:00 p.m.	Houston Christian^{†}	No. 9	Gayle and Tom Benson Stadium; San Antonio, TX	ESPN+	W 45–20	2,189
November 9	2:00 p.m.	Lamar	No. 8	Gayle and Tom Benson Stadium; San Antonio, TX	ESPN+	W 41–20	2,055
November 16	2:00 p.m.	at Stephen F. Austin	No. 6	Homer Bryce Stadium; Nacogdoches, TX	ESPN+	W 27–20	4,116
November 23	1:00 p.m.	at East Texas A&M	No. 6	Ernest Hawkins Field at Memorial Stadium; Commerce, TX	ESPN+	W 38–24	3,724
December 7	1:00 p.m.	No. 12 Villanova*	No. 6	Gayle and Tom Benson Stadium; San Antonio, TX (NCAA Division I Second Round)	ESPN+	W 13–6	1,926
December 14	11:00 a.m.	at No. 2 South Dakota State*	No. 6	Dana J. Dykhouse Stadium; Brookings, SD (NCAA Division I Quarterfinal)	ESPN	L 14–55	8,640
*Non-conference game; ^{†}Homecoming; Rankings from STATS Poll released prior to the game; All times are in Central time

== Personnel ==
=== Coaching staff ===
Name	Position	Alma mater	Joined staff
Clint Killough	Head coach	Incarnate Word (2015)	2018
Kenny Hill	Associate head coach / running backs	TCU (2017)	2023
Conner McQueen	Offensive coordinator / quarterbacks	Texas A&M (2017)	2023
Jim Gush	Defensive coordinator	Bucknell (1981)	2023
Blair Cavanaugh	Special teams coordinator	Portland State (2016)	2022
Sam Bennett	Linebackers / academic coordinator	Texas Tech (2010)	2023
Ty Darlington	Offensive line / run game coordinator	Oklahoma (2016)	2023
Ben Olson	Defensive line / defensive run game coordinator	Eastern Illinois (2013)	2023
George Sanders	Defensive backs / defensive pass game coordinator	Southwest Baptist (2016)	2023
Willis White	Wide receivers / pass game coordinator	Alabama State (2018)	2023
Nick Young	Tight ends / recruiting coordinator	Toledo (2012)	2023
Tre Spragg	Defensive quality control	Incarnate Word (2015)	2023
Ashaad Mabry	Defensive quality control	UTSA	2024
Trevor Begue	Offensive quality control	Incarnate Word (2022)	2024
John Scifers	Special teams quality control / video coordinator	Incarnate Word (2021)	2023
Taylor Grimes	Offensive quality control	Incarnate Word (2022)	2024
Cody Dunn	Director of football operations	McGill (2021)	2022
Mauricio De La Garza	Offensive graduate assistant	Incarnate Word (2017)	2022
Lamont Johnson	Offensive graduate assistant	Incarnate Word (2019)	2023
Luke Pardee	Offensive graduate assistant	TCU	2024
Brayden Strauss	Defensive graduate assistant	Baylor	2024
Davis Conley	Head strength and conditioning	LaGrange (2017)	2022
Augie Melendez Jr.	Head football athletic trainer	Texas A&M University–Corpus Christi (2017)	2017

=== Roster ===
2024 Incarnate Word Cardinals football
Quarterback: 10 Zach Calzada – (redshirt) Graduate Student (6'4, 200); 12 Solomon James – Sophomore (6'0, 180); 15 Richard Torres – (redshirt) Sophomore (6'4, 225); 16 Trever Ham – Freshman (5'11, 170); 17 Talon Lewin – Freshman (6'1, 200); Running back: 0 Lontrell Turner – Sophomore (5'11, 180); 3 Dekalon Taylor – Junior (5'9, 166); 4 Isaiah Robinson – (redshirt) Graduate Student (6'0, 212); 5 Jarrell Wiley – (redshirt) Senior (5'10, 182); 20 Timothy Carter – Junior (6'0, 215); 21 Anquan Willis – (redshirt) Freshman (6'0, 220); 28 Nick Meehan – (redshirt) Freshman (5'11, 193); 29 Daniel Fayombo – Sophomore (6'0, 180); Wide receiver: 1 Mason Pierce – (redshirt) Graduate Student (5'6, 185); 2 Anthony Stell – (redshirt) Graduate Student (5'11, 185); 6 Jalen Walthall – (redshirt) Junior (6'2, 180); 7 Jaelon Travis – (redshirt) Junior (6'0, 200); 8 Jameson Garcia – (redshirt) Freshman (6'1, 190); 9 Roy Alexander – (redshirt) Graduate Student (5'10, 200); 11 Josh Lorick – Junior (6'0, 170); 13 Jaren Mitchell – (redshirt) Graduate Student (5'10, 180); 14 Matthew Ramirez – Sophomore (6'0, 160); 83 Grant Jaeger – Sophomore (5'8, 160); 87 Jonathan Johnson – Sophomore (6'0, 155); 88 Patrick Bridges – Freshman (6'1, 195); Tight end: 18 Jackson Lowe – (redshirt) Graduate Student (6'5, 237); 35 Chance Trentman-Rosas – (redshirt) Graduate Student (6'3, 215); 47 Dane Farley – Sophomore (6'1, 230); 80 Jackson Muckelroy – Sophomore (6'4, 205); 89 Logan Compton – Junior (6'4, 245); Kicker/Punter: 27 Ryan Shamburger – P – (redshirt) Graduate Student (6'2, 195); 46 Brack Peacock – K – (redshirt) Freshman (5'6, 165); 48 Julian Lee – K/P – (redshirt) Graduate Student (5'9, 180); 94 Connor Bryan – P – (redshirt) Junior (5'10, 180); 95 Nicholas Rigas – K – Freshman (6'0, 185); Long snapper: 22 Bryce Felt – Junior (5'9, 180); 49 Mike Midkiff – (redshirt) Senior (6'3, 215); 51 Jonas Halbrook – Freshman	Offensive line: 55 River Gordon – G – (redshirt) Junior (6'4, 315); 60 Mason Williams – C – (redshirt) Graduate Student (6'3, 295); 62 Austin DeArmond – T – (redshirt) Freshman (6'4, 294); 63 Lamont "LD" Smith – OL – Freshman (6'3, 250); 64 Ozzy Garcia – OL – Sophomore (6'1, 290); 65 Shontrail Key – OL – (redshirt) Junior (6'5, 290); 67 Frank Riggins – OL – Freshman (6'4, 240); 68 David Hensley – G – (redshirt) Sophomore (6'4, 315); 69 David Brown – OL – Freshman; 70 Traveon Newsome – G – (redshirt) Junior (6'2, 350); 72 Nolan Hay – OL – Junior (6'4, 300); 73 Caleb Flores – C/G – (redshirt) Freshman (6'4, 279); 74 Christian Fitchett – T – Sophomore (6'5, 270); 75 Rasheed Jackson – T – Sophomore (6'7, 320); 76 Lawson Petty – G – Sophomore (6'3, 280); 77 Jayden Borjas – G/T – (redshirt) Graduate Student (6'5, 295); 78 Branon Jackson – G – Senior (6'3, 295); 79 Adam May – T – Freshman (6'6, 295); Defensive line: 8 Chase Carter – DL – (redshirt) Sophomore (6'4, 255); 9 Talib Salahuddin – DL – (redshirt) Junior (6'5, 245); 10 John Mathis – DT – (redshirt) Junior (6'2, 265); 15 Marcus Brown – DE – Senior (6'5, 245); 41 Terrell Elliott – DT – Junior (6'2, 300); 43 Emiliano Fears – DL – Sophomore (6'1, 215); 44 Devin Grant – DL – (redshirt) Junior (6'3, 225); 45 Logan Granville – DE – Sophomore (6'3, 230); 50 Jace Bardwell – DT – Freshman (6'2, 300); 90 Myron Warren – DT – (redshirt) Senior (6'2, 275); 91 Lloyd Johnson – DL – (redshirt) Sophomore (6'2, 280); 92 Jeremiah Robinson – DL – Sophomore (6'2, 240); 93 TJ Harold – DT – Sophomore (6'1, 290); 97 Isaiah Pedack – DL – (redshirt) Junior (6'3, 275); 99 Josh Gonzalez – DT – (redshirt) Junior (6'3, 310)	Linebacker: 0 Declan Williams – Junior (6'2, 245); 1 Darius Sanders – Senior (6'2, 199); 5 Jonathan Thomas – (redshirt) Graduate Student (6'3, 260); 11 Tylan Foster – Senior (5'11, 225); 12 Mister Williams – (redshirt) Junior (6'0, 245); 13 Dune Smith – (redshirt) Graduate Student (5'11, 200); 22 Derrick Lewis – (redshirt) Junior (6'1, 210); 30 Jordan Norwood – (redshirt) Sophomore (6'1, 215); 32 Josh Emmanuel – Senior (6'1, 235); 33 Tylan George – Senior (5'11, 215); 34 Leo Bisesi – Freshman (6'0, 210); 38 Jeremiah Swain – Freshman (5'11, 210); 39 Hunter Willis – Freshman; 40 Diego Moran – Freshman; 42 Caleb Lewis – (redshirt) Junior (6'2, 235); 54 Josh Pastrana – Sophomore (6'0, 205); Defensive back: 2 James Tuayemie – CB – Senior (5'11, 205); 3 Mason Chambers – S – (redshirt) Senior (6'0, 210); 4 Chris Pierce – CB – Junior (6'0, 170); 6 Ronald Wilson – S – Senior (5'10, 180); 7 Kendrick Stone – DB – Junior (6'2, 190); 14 Emmonte Davis – DB – (redshirt) Graduate Student (6'1, 180); 16 Matt Kordas – DB – (redshirt) Junior (6'1, 190); 18 D'Arius Carmouche – CB – Sophomore (6'0, 165); 19 Isaiah Pruitt – DB – Freshman (5'11, 180); 20 A.J. Harris – S – (redshirt) Freshman (5'10, 170); 21 A.J. Tisdell – CB – (redshirt) Freshman (5'11, 195); 23 Drew Merrill – DB – Sophomore (6'0, 190); 24 Barry Dillon – DB – (redshirt) Freshman (6'1, 170); 25 Patrick Batiste – CB – Sophomore (6'0, 185); 28 Jayden Staggers – CB – Junior (5'11, 167); 31 DeVonte Wilson – S – (redshirt) Junior (6'2, 196); 34 Kaden Jammer – DB – Freshman (5'9, 160); 36 Keenon Pitts – CB – (redshirt) Junior (5'10, 169); 37 Nehemiah Lowry – DB – Freshman (5'8, 145); Legend: (C) Team captain; (S) Suspended; (I) Ineligible; Injured; Redshirt

== Depth chart ==
Defense

STAR
1 Darius Sanders OR
13 Dune Smith
31 Devonte Wilson

FS
6 Ronald Wilson
25 Patrick Baptiste

WLB	MLB
11 Tylan Foster	12 Mister Williams
32 Josh Emmanuel OR; 30 Jordan Norwood	5 Jonathon Thomas

SS
3 Mason Chambers
16 Matt Kordas

CB
7 Kendrick Stone
21 AJ Tisdell

DE	DT	DT	DE
44 Devin Grant	99 Josh Gonzalez OR; 41 Terrell Elliott	8 Chase Carter	15 Marcus Brown OR; 0 Declan Williams
9 Talib Salahuddin	91 Lloyd Johnson	90 Myron Warren OR; 10 John Mathis	42 Caleb Lewis

CB
18 D'Arius Carmouche OR
14 Emmonte Davis
24 Barry Dillon

Offense

WR
11 Josh Lorick
8 Jameson Garcia

WR
9 Roy Alexander
13 Jaren Mitchell

LT	LG	C	RG	RT
75 Rasheed Jackson	70 Traveon Newsome	60 Mason Williams	77 Jayden Borjas OR; 73 Caleb Flores	72 Nolan Hay
78 Branon Jackson	76 Lawson Petty	62 Austin DeArmond	68 David Hensley	65 Shontrail Key

TE
89 Logan Compton OR
18 Jackson Lowe
47 Dane Farley

WR
6 Jalen Walthall
7 Jaelon Travis

QB
10 Zach Calzada
15 Richard Torres

Key reserves
WR - 1 Mason Pierce
CB - 2 James Tuayemie
WR - 2 Anthony Stell
CB - 4 Chris Pierce
RB - 20 Timothy Carter
DL - 97 Isaiah Pedack

RB
4 Isaiah Robinson OR
3 Dekalon Taylor
5 Jarrell Wiley OR
0 Lontrell Turner

Special teams
PK 46 Brack Peacock
PK 48 Julian Lee
P 27 Ryan Shamburger
KR 3 Dekalon Taylor OR
1 Mason Pierce
PR 3 Dekalon Taylor OR
1 Mason Pierce
LS Bryce Felt
H 35 Chance Trentman-Rosas

== Game summaries ==
=== Northern Colorado ===
Uniform combination
Helmet	Jersey	Pants

Game One – Northern Colorado Bears (0–0) at No. 14 Incarnate Word Cardinals (0–0)

Quarter	1	2	3	4	Total
Bears	7	0	0	0	7
No. 14 Cardinals	7	7	14	0	28

at Gayle and Tom Benson Stadium, San Antonio, TX

- Date: August 31
- Game time: 6:00 pm
- Game weather: Temperature: 92 • Wind: NE 10 mph • Weather: Cloudy
- Game attendance: 2,257
- Referee: James Brookhart
- TV announcers (ESPN+): Karl Schoening (play-by-play) & Blair Villarreal (analyst)
- Box Score Recap

Game information

First Quarter

- UIW – 13:40 Dekalon Taylor 27 yard run, Brack Peacock kick
  UIW 7–0 Drive: 5 plays, 75 yards, 1:20
- UNC – 5:40 Vann Schield 58 yard run, Hunter Green kick
  Tied 7–7 Drive: 5 plays, 89 yards, 2:12

Second Quarter

- UIW – 2:57 Jalen Walthall 46 yard pass from Zach Calzada, Brack Peacock kick
  UIW 14–7 Drive: 7 plays, 82 yards, 3:18

Third Quarter

- UIW – 14:23 Logan Compton 13 yard pass from Zach Calzada, Brack Peacock kick
  UIW 21–7 Drive: 2 plays, 16 yards, 0:37
- UIW – 6:35 Dekalon Taylor 1 yard run, Brack Peacock kick
  UIW 28–7 Drive: 13 plays, 86 yards, 6:11

Statistics	UNC	UIW
First downs	15	24
Total yards	71–360	74–408
Rushing yards	43–214	39–203
Passing yards	146	205
Passing: Comp–Att–Int	17–28–2	21–35–1
Time of possession	29:47	30:13

Team	Category	Player	Statistics
Northern Colorado	Passing	Peter Costelli	16/26, 141 yards, 2 INT
Northern Colorado	Rushing	Vann Schield	11 carries, 80 yards, 1 TD
Northern Colorado	Receiving	Brayden Munroe	7 receptions, 66 yards
Incarnate Word	Passing	Zach Calzada	21/35, 205 yards, 2 TD, 1 INT
Incarnate Word	Rushing	Dekalon Taylor	14 carries, 79 yards, 2 TD
Incarnate Word	Receiving	Jalen Walthall	5 receptions, 103 yards, 1 TD

=== at No. 1 South Dakota State ===
Uniform combination
Helmet	Jersey	Pants

Game Two – No. 12 Incarnate Word Cardinals (1–0) at No. 1 South Dakota State Jackrabbits (0–1)

Quarter	1	2	3	4	Total
No. 12 Cardinals	3	7	7	7	24
No. 1 Jackrabbits	0	17	14	14	45

at Dana J. Dykhouse Stadium, Brookings, SD

- Date: September 7
- Game time: 6:00 pm
- Game weather: Temperature: 73 • Wind: W 5 mph • Weather: Sunny
- Game attendance: 19,321
- Referee: Jason Perkins
- TV announcers (ESPN+): Jay Elsen (play-by-play) & Kurtiss Riggs (analyst)
- Box Score Recap

Game information

First Quarter

- UIW – 6:06 Brack Peacock 37 yard field goal
  UIW 3–0 Drive: 9 plays, 61 yards, 3:55

Second Quarter

- SDSU – 14:57 Hunter Dustman 30 yard field goal
  Tied 3–3 Drive: 12 plays, 67 yards, 6:08
- SDSU – 11:11 Greyton Gannon 41 yard pass from Mark Gronowski, Hunter Dustman kick
  SDSU 10–3 Drive: 5 plays, 73 yards, 1:48
- UIW – 6:51 Jalen Walthall 5 yard pass from Zach Calzada, Brack Peacock kick
  Tied 10–10 Drive: 10 plays, 75 yards, 4:20
- SDSU – 3:32 Graham Goering 22 yard pass from Mark Gronowski, Hunter Dustman kick
  SDSU 17–10 Drive: 8 plays, 77 yards, 3:17

Third Quarter

- UIW – 13:11 Jalen Walthall 69 yard pass from Zach Calzada, Brack Peacock kick
  Tied 17–17 Drive: 4 plays, 91 yards, 1:46
- SDSU – 7:13 Griffin Wilde 11 yard pass from Mark Gronowski, Hunter Dustman kick
  SDSU 24–17 Drive: 11 plays, 69 yards, 5:56
- SDSU – 3:58 Amar Johnson 6 yard run, Hunter Dustman kick
  SDSU 31–17 Drive: 3 plays, 72 yards, 1:20

Fourth Quarter

- UIW – 14:22 Roy Alexander 35 yard pass from Zach Calzada, Brack Peacock kick
  SDSU 31–24 Drive: 9 plays, 75 yards, 4:36
- SDSU – 10:34 Amar Johnson 3 yard run, Hunter Dustman kick
  SDSU 38–24 Drive: 8 plays, 59 yards, 3:45
- SDSU – 7:47 Griffin Wilde 25 yard pass from Mark Gronowski, Hunter Dustman kick
  SDSU 45–24 Drive: 4 plays, 42 yards, 1:39

Statistics	UIW	SDSU
First downs	20	31
Total yards	59–419	74–515
Rushing yards	20–68	42–230
Passing yards	351	285
Passing: Comp–Att–Int	31–39–0	21–31–1
Time of possession	24:43	35:17

Team	Category	Player	Statistics
Incarnate Word	Passing	Zach Calzada	31/39, 351 yards, 3 TD
Incarnate Word	Rushing	Zach Calzada	7 carries, 43 yards
Incarnate Word	Receiving	Jalen Walthall	7 receptions, 137 yards, 2 TD
South Dakota State	Passing	Mark Gronowski	21/32, 285 yards, 4 TD, 1 INT
South Dakota State	Rushing	Amar Johnson	19 carries, 112 yards, 2 TD
South Dakota State	Receiving	Griffin Wilde	10 receptions, 106 yards, 2 TD

=== at No. 9 Southern Illinois ===
Uniform combination
Helmet	Jersey	Pants

Game Three – No. 12 Incarnate Word Cardinals (1–1) at No. 9 Southern Illinois Salukis (1–1)

Quarter	1	2	3	4	Total
No. 12 Cardinals	7	7	0	14	28
No. 9 Salukis	14	21	0	0	35

at Saluki Stadium, Carbondale, IL

- Date: September 14
- Game time: 6:00 pm
- Game weather: Temperature: 80 • Wind: S 2 mph • Weather: Cloudy
- Game attendance: 7,879
- Referee: Aaron Adams
- TV announcers (ESPN+): Dan Gresham, Lemont Williams, Bob Slovak
- Box Score Recap

Game information

First Quarter

- SIU – 10:44 Keontez Lewis 37 yard pass from DJ Williams, Paul Geelen kick
  SIU 7–0 Drive: 8 plays, 85 yards, 3:07
- UIW – 4:19 Logan Compton 1 yard pass from Zach Calzada, Brack Peacock kick
  Tied 7–7 Drive: 13 plays, 75 yards, 6:25
- SIU – 2:37 Shaun Lester Jr. 10 yard run, Paul Geelen kick
  SIU 14–7 Drive: 3 plays, 63 yards, 1:34

Second Quarter

- SIU – 12:52 DJ Williams 28 yard run, Paul Geelen kick
  SIU 21–7 Drive: 6 plays, 63 yards, 1:14
- UIW – 4:38 Jalen Walthall 40 yard pass from Zach Calzada, Brack Peacock kick
  SIU 21–14 Drive: 1 play, 40 yards, 0:34
- SIU – 2:06 Keontez Lewis 57 yard run, Paul Geelen kick
  SIU 28–14 Drive: 6 plays, 79 yards, 1:38
- SIU – 0:00 Ryan Schwendeman 1 yard pass from DJ Williams, Paul Geelen kick
  SIU 35–14 Drive: 9 plays, 83 yards, 0:44

Fourth Quarter

- UIW – 14:44 Zach Calzada 23 yard run, Brack Peacock kick
  SIU 35–21 Drive: 10 plays, 94 yards, 2:30
- UIW – 5:03 Jalen Walthall 25 yard pass from Zach Calzada, Brack Peacock kick
  SIU 35–28 Drive: 8 plays, 78 yards, 2:53

Statistics	UIW	SIU
First downs	25	23
Total yards	77–437	77–543
Rushing yards	23–71	45–207
Passing yards	366	336
Passing: Comp–Att–Int	35–54–1	22–32–1
Time of possession	30:39	29:51

Team	Category	Player	Statistics
Incarnate Word	Passing	Zach Calzada	35/54, 366 yards, 3 TD, 1 INT
Incarnate Word	Rushing	Dekalon Taylor	8 carries, 32 yards
Incarnate Word	Receiving	Roy Alexander	10 receptions, 117 yards
Southern Illinois	Passing	DJ Williams	19/27, 301 yards, 2 TD, 1 INT
Southern Illinois	Rushing	DJ Williams	12 carries, 79 yards, 1 TD
Southern Illinois	Receiving	Keontez Lewis	8 receptions, 148 yards, 1 TD

=== Northern Arizona ===
Uniform combination
Helmet	Jersey	Pants

Game Four – Northern Arizona Lumberjacks (2–1) at No. 15 Incarnate Word Cardinals (1–2)

Quarter	1	2	3	4	Total
Lumberjacks	7	7	0	0	14
No. 15 Cardinals	7	10	14	7	38

at Gayle and Tom Benson Stadium, San Antonio, TX

- Date: September 21
- Game time: 6:00 pm
- Game weather: Temperature: 94 • Wind: SE 11 mph • Weather: Sunny
- Game attendance: 1,413
- Referee: Gary Leeper
- TV announcers (ESPN+): Dan Gresham, Lemont Williams, Bob Slovak
- Box Score Recap

Game information

First Quarter

- NAU – 10:38 Darvon Hubbard 47 yard run, Marcus Lye kick
  NAU 7–0 Drive: 1 play, 47 yards, 0:09
- UIW – 4:03 Mason Pierce 13 pass from Zach Calzada, Brack Peacock kick
  Tied 7–7 Drive: 11 plays, 47 yards, 3:29

Second Quarter

- NAU – 8:29 Tay Lanier 37 yard pass from Ty Pennington, Marcus Lye kick
  NAU 14–7 Drive: 9 plays, 68 yards, 4:28
- UIW – 1:51 Dekalon Taylor 35 yard run, Brack Peacock kick
  Tied 14–14 Drive: 7 plays, 81 yards, 2:46
- UIW – 0:00 Brack Peacock 40 yard field goal
  UIW 17–14 Drive: 3 plays, 1 yard, 0:43

Third Quarter

- UIW – 11:08 Roy Alexander 10 yard run, Brack Peacock kick
  UIW 24–14 Drive: 2 plays, 13 yards, 0:24
- UIW – 6:00 Dekalon Taylor 97 yard run, Brack Peacock kick
  UIW 31–14 Drive: 1 play, 97 yards, 0:24

Fourth Quarter

- UIW – 7:06 Roy Alexander 32 yard pass from Zach Calzada, Brack Peacock kick
  UIW 38–14 Drive: 7 plays, 72 yards, 3:28

Statistics	NAU	UIW
First downs	21	18
Total yards	75–439	60–412
Rushing yards	34–166	37–232
Passing yards	273	180
Passing: Comp–Att–Int	24–41–0	14–23–0
Time of possession	33:39	26:21

Team	Category	Player	Statistics
Northern Arizona	Passing	Ty Pennington	20/35, 247 yards, 1 TD
Northern Arizona	Rushing	Darvon Hubbard	12 carries, 85 yards, 1 TD
Northern Arizona	Receiving	Bryzai White	4 receptions, 63 yards
Incarnate Word	Passing	Zach Calzada	14/23, 180 yards, 2 TD
Incarnate Word	Rushing	Dekalon Taylor	17 carries, 184 yards, 2 TD
Incarnate Word	Receiving	Roy Alexander	5 receptions, 76 yards, 1 TD

=== Prairie View A&M ===
Uniform combination
Helmet	Jersey	Pants

Game Five – Prairie View A&M Panthers (2–3) at No. 15 Incarnate Word Cardinals (2–2)

Quarter	1	2	3	4	Total
Panthers	14	0	7	7	28
No. 15 Cardinals	10	9	23	14	56

at Gayle and Tom Benson Stadium, San Antonio, TX

- Date: October 5
- Game time: 6:02 pm
- Game weather: Temperature: 92 • Wind: NE 8 mph • Weather: Clear
- Game attendance: 2,003
- Referee: Craig Helser
- TV announcers (ESPN+): Karl Schoening, Blair Villareal
- Box Score Recap

Game information

First Quarter

- UIW – 9:44 Brack Peacock 37 yard field goal
  UIW 3–0 Drive: 13 plays, 57 yards, 5:16
- PVAMU – 7:06 Shemar Savage 42 yard pass from Jaden Johnson, Guillermo Garcia Rodriguez kick
  PVAMU 7–3 Drive: 5 plays, 65 yards, 2:38
- UIW – 3:22 Jalen Walthall 9 yard pass from Zach Calzada, Brack Peacock kick
  UIW 10–7 Drive: 9 plays, 75 yards, 3:44
- PVAMU – 2:38 Scooter Adams 54 yard pass from Jaden Johnson, Guillermo Garcia Rodriguez kick
  PVAMU 14–10 Drive: 3 plays, 65 yards, 0:44

Second Quarter

- UIW – 12:27 Brack Peacock 27 yard field goal
  PVAMU 14–13 Drive: 11 plays, 49 yards, 2:33
- UIW – 6:02 Roy Alexander 7 yard pass from Zach Calzada, Zach Calzada pass failed
  UIW 19–14 Drive: 7 plays, 56 yards, 2:53

Third Quarter

- UIW – 10:51 Jalen Walthall 42 yard pass from Zach Calzada, Brack Peacock kick
  UIW 26–14 Drive: 7 plays, 64 yards, 3:08
- PVAMU – 9:27 Trejon Spiller 43 yard pass from Chris Herron, Guillermo Garcia Rodriguez kick
  UIW 26–21 Drive: 5 plays, 73 yards, 1:18
- UIW – 6:10 Dekalon Taylor 14 yard run, Roy Alexander run
  UIW 34–21 Drive: 6 plays, 65 yards, 3:16
- UIW – 1:48 Timothy Carter 5 yard run, Zach Calzada run
  UIW 42–21 Drive: 9 plays, 67 yards, 3:19

Fourth Quarter

- UIW – 7:40 Lontrell Turner 2 yard run, Brack Peacock kick
  UIW 49–21 Drive: 5 plays, 28 yards, 2:16
- UIW – 5:17 Dekalon Taylor 62 yard punt return, Brack Peacock kick
  UIW 56–21
- PVAMU – 0:42 Eric Zachery 50 yard interception return, Guillermo Garcia Rodriguez kick
  UIW 56–28

Statistics	PVAMU	UIW
First downs	15	30
Total yards	54–280	78-516
Rushing yards	26-83	42–225
Passing yards	197	291
Passing: Comp–Att–Int	15–28–0	27–36–1
Time of possession	25:06	32:23

Team	Category	Player	Statistics
Prairie View A&M	Passing	Jaden Johnson	12/24, 149 yards, 2 TD
Prairie View A&M	Rushing	Scooter Adams	6 carries, 39 yards
Prairie View A&M	Receiving	Scooter Adams	1 reception, 54 yards, 1 TD
Incarnate Word	Passing	Zach Calzada	27/34, 291 yards, 3 TD
Incarnate Word	Rushing	Dekalon Taylor	17 carries, 84 yards, 1 TD
Incarnate Word	Receiving	Jalen Walthall	12 receptions, 170 yards, 1 TD

=== Nicholls ===
Uniform combination
Helmet	Jersey	Pants

Game Six – Nicholls Colonels (2–3; 0–0) at No. 15 Incarnate Word Cardinals (3–2; 0–0)

Quarter	1	2	3	4	Total
Colonels	3	7	0	0	10
No. 15 Cardinals	14	14	14	13	55

at Gayle and Tom Benson Stadium, San Antonio, TX

- Date: October 12
- Game time: 6:02 pm
- Game weather: Temperature: 92 • Wind: S 8 mph • Weather: Sunny
- Game attendance: 1,801
- Referee: Craig Helser
- TV announcers (ESPN+): Karl Schoening (play-by-play), Sam Kaman (analyst), and Blair Villarreal (sideline)
- Box Score Recap

Game information

First Quarter

- NIC – 5:42 Gabe Showalter 19 yard field goal
  NSU 3–0 Drive: 17 plays, 63 yards, 9:18
- UIW – 2:05 Lontrell Turner 30 yard pass from Zach Calzada, Brack Peacock kick
  UIW 7–3 Drive: 8 plays, 75 yards, 3:37
- UIW – 1:45 Lloyd Johnson 30 yard fumble recovery, Brack Peacock kick
  UIW 14–3

Second Quarter

- NIC – 10:30 Scrapy Osby 8 yard pass from Pat McQuade, Gabe Showalter kick
  UIW 14–10 Drive: 8 plays, 24 yards, 1:24
- UIW – 7:51 Jackson Lowe 16 yard pass from Zach Calzada, Brack Peacock kick
  UIW 21–10 Drive: 6 plays, 75 yards, 2:39
- UIW – 0:35 Jackson Lowe 5 yard pass from Zach Calzada, Brack Peacock kick
  UIW 28–10 Drive: 67 plays, 28 yards, 2:23

Third Quarter

- UIW – 11:35 Logan Compton 4 yard pass from Josh Lorick, Brack Peacock kick
  UIW 35–10 Drive: 2 plays, 17 yards, 0:45
- UIW – 0:00 Jalen Walthall 71 yard pass from Zach Calzada, Brack Peacock kick
  UIW 42–10 Drive: 8 plays, 733 yards, 3:30

Fourth Quarter

- UIW – 8:15 Jalen Walthall 7 yard pass from Zach Calzada, Brack Peacock kick
  UIW 49–10 Drive: 8 plays, 63 yards, 3:49
- UIW – 3:22 Dune Smith 55 yard interception return, Brack Peacock kick missed
  UIW 55–10

Statistics	NIC	UIW
First downs	18	16
Total yards	72–260	57–363
Rushing yards	40–123	23–89
Passing yards	137	274
Passing: Comp–Att–Int	19–32–2	26–34–1
Time of possession	36:24	23:36

Team	Category	Player	Statistics
Nicholls	Passing	Pat McQuaide	17/28, 90 yards, 1 TD, 2 INT
Nicholls	Rushing	Jaylon Spears	12 carries, 44 yards
Nicholls	Receiving	Dany'e Brooks	3 receptions, 41 yards
Incarnate Word	Passing	Zach Calzada	25/33, 270 yards, 5 TD, 1 INT
Incarnate Word	Rushing	Dekalon Taylor	6 carries, 31 yards
Incarnate Word	Receiving	Jalen Walthall	4 receptions, 80 yards, 2 TD

=== McNeese ===
Uniform combination
Helmet	Jersey	Pants

Game Seven – McNeese Cowboys (4–3; 1–1) at No. 14 Incarnate Word Cardinals (4–2; 1-0)

Quarter	1	2	3	4	Total
Cowboys	7	3	7	0	17
No. 14 Cardinals	0	13	14	3	30

at Gayle and Tom Benson Stadium, San Antonio, Texas

- Date: October 19
- Game time: 4:02 PM
- Game weather: Temperature: 85 • Weather: Sunny
- Game attendance: 1,634
- Referee: Matt Beck
- TV announcers (ESPN+): Karl Schoening (play-by-play), Sam Kaman (analyst), and Blair Villarreal (sideline)
- Box Score Recap

Game information

First quarter

- MCN – 1:54 Jer'Michael Carter 36 yard pass from Kamden Sixkiller, Tyler Larco kick
  MCN 7–0 Drive: 5 plays, 50 yards, 1:54

Second quarter

- UIW – 10:18 Brack Peacock 26 yard field goal
  MCN 7–3 Drive: 19 plays, 56 yards, 6:27
- UIW – 3:57 Zach Calzada 15 yard run, Brack Peacock kick
  UIW 10–7 Drive: 10 plays, 68 yards, 4:24
- MCN – 1:45 Tyler Larco 35 yard field goal
  Tied 10–10 Drive: 7 plays, 57 yards, 2:12
- UIW – 0:12 Brack Peacock 30 yard field goal
  UIW 13–10 Drive: 9 plays, 63 yards, 1:33

Third quarter

- UIW – 12:57 Dekalon Taylor 7 yard run, Brack Peacock kick
  UIW 20–10 Drive: 6 plays, 36 yards, 1:53
- UIW – 8:35 Jalen Walthall 28 yard pass from Richard Torres, Brack Peacock kick
  UIW 27–10 Drive: 4 plays, 37 yards, 1:36
- MCN – 3:03 Joshon Barbie 38 yard run, Tyler Larco kick
  UIW 27–16 Drive: 5 plays, 85 yards, 2:00

Fourth quarter

- UIW – 12:16 Brack Peacock 28 yard field goal
  UIW 30–16 Drive: 14 plays, 60 yards, 5:47

Statistics	MCN	UIW
First downs	15	24
Total yards	324	424
Rushing yards	105	182
Passing yards	219	242
Passing: Comp–Att–Int	21–36–0	23–44–1
Time of possession	23:30	36:30

Team	Category	Player	Statistics
McNeese	Passing	Kamden Sixkiller	21/36, 219 yards, 1 TD
McNeese	Rushing	Joshon Barbie	10 carries, 59 yards, 1 TD
McNeese	Receiving	Jer'Michael Carter	3 receptions, 56 yards, 1 TD
Incarnate Word	Passing	Zach Calzada	21/42, 204 yards, 1 INT
Incarnate Word	Rushing	Dekalon Taylor	25 carries, 103 yards, 1 TD
Incarnate Word	Receiving	Josh Lorick	5 receptions, 76 yards

=== at Southeastern Louisiana ===
Uniform combination
Helmet	Jersey	Pants

Game Eight – No. 10 Incarnate Word Cardinals (5–2; 2–0) at Southeastern Louisiana Lions (4–4; 3–0)

Quarter	1	2	3	4	Total
No. 10 Cardinals	7	13	7	7	34
Lions	3	10	10	8	31

at Strawberry Stadium, Hammond, LA

- Date: October 26
- Game time: 6:00 pm
- Game weather: Temperature: 80 • Wind: S 7 mph • Weather: Clear
- Game attendance: 3,116
- Referee: James Brookhart
- TV announcers (ESPN+): Logan Loving (play–by–play) & Chase Gispert (analyst)
- Box Score Recap

Game information

First Quarter

- UIW – 8:39 Jalen Walthall 41 yard pass from Zach Calzada, Brack Peacock kick
  UIW 7–0 Drive: 7 plays, 78 yards, 2:55
- SLU – 1:31 Riley Callaghan 23 yard field goal
  UIW 7–3 Drive: 15 plays, 81 yards, 7:01

Second Quarter

- SLU – 12:26 Riley Callaghan 46 yard field goal
  UIW 7–6 Drive: 8 plays, 22 yards, 1:20
- UIW – 3:47 Dekalon Taylor 3 yard run, PAT failed
  UIW 13–6 Drive: 13 plays, 75 yards, 8:39
- UIW – 3:022 Marcus Brown 22 yard fumble recovery, Brack Peacock kick
  UIW 20–6
- SLU – 0:21 Errol Rogers Jr. 5 yard pass from Eli Sawyer, Riley Callaghan kick
  UIW 20–13 Drive: 12 plays, 74 yards, 2:33

Third Quarter

- SLU – 8:50 Riley Callaghan 31 yard field goal
  UIW 20–16 Drive: 11 plays, 57 yards, 4:49
- UIW – 1:06 Roy Alexander 36 yard pass from Zach Calzada, Brack Peacock kick
  UIW 27–16 Drive: 4 plays, 55 yards, 1:44
- SLU – 0:51 Brandon Hayes 94 yard kickoff return, Riley Callaghan kick
  UIW 27–23

Fourth Quarter

- UIW – 14:24 Mason Chambers 50 yard interception return, Brack Peacock kick
  UIW 34–23
- SLU – 4:58 Jaylon Domingeaux 10 yard pass from Eli Sawyer, Cade Collier pass
  UIW 34–31 Drive: 8 plays, 71 yards, 2:21

Statistics	UIW	SLU
First downs	18	25
Total yards	63–369	79–341
Rushing yards	32–131	35–112
Passing yards	238	229
Passing: Comp–Att–Int	21–31–0	26–44–2
Time of possession	28:25	31:35

Team	Category	Player	Statistics
Incarnate Word	Passing	Zach Calzada	21/31, 238 yards, 2 TD
Incarnate Word	Rushing	Dekalon Taylor	16 carries, 82 yards, 1 TD
Incarnate Word	Receiving	Logan Compton	2 receptions, 71 yards
Southeastern Louisiana	Passing	Eli Sawyer	25/42, 207 yards, 2 TD, 2 INT
Southeastern Louisiana	Rushing	Antonio Martin Jr.	18 carries, 75 yards
Southeastern Louisiana	Receiving	Jaylon Domingeaux	10 receptions, 97 yards, 1 TD

=== Houston Christian ===
Uniform combination
Helmet	Jersey	Pants

Game Nine – Houston Christian Huskies (3–5; 1–2) at No. 9 Incarnate Word Cardinals (6–2; 3–0)

Quarter	1	2	3	4	Total
Huskies	3	3	0	14	20
No. 9 Cardinals	10	21	14	0	45

at Gayle and Tom Benson Stadium, San Antonio, TX

- Date: November 2
- Game time: 2:03 pm
- Game weather: Temperature: 81 • Wind: SE 11 mph • Weather: Cloudy
- Game attendance: 2,189
- Referee: Ed Bourgeios
- TV announcers (ESPN+): Karl Schoening (play-by-play), Sam Kaman (analyst), & Blair Villarreal (sideline)
- Box Score Recap

Game information

First Quarter

- HCU – 12:16 Dillon Fedor 37 yard field goal
  HCU 3–0 Drive: 7 plays, 33 yards, 2:36
- UIW – 8:08 Brack Peacock 25 yard field goal
  Tied 3–3 Drive: 12 plays, 53 yards, 4:00
- UIW – 6:04 Dekalon Taylor 28 yard run, Brack Peacock kick
  UIW 10–3 Drive: 2 plays, 41 yards, 0:35

Second Quarter

- UIW – 8:42 Roy Alexander 26 yard pass from Zach Calzada, Brack Peacock kick
  UIW 17–3 Drive: 2 plays, 53 yards, 0:29
- HCU – 4:46 Dillon Fedor 34 yard field goal
  UIW 17–6 Drive: 9 plays, 58 yards, 3:56
- UIW – 1:50 Zach Calzada 2 yard run, Brack Peacock kick
  UIW 24–6 Drive: 9 plays, 82 yards, 2:52
- UIW – 0:12 Roy Alexander 9 yard pass from Zach Calzada, Brack Peacock kick
  UIW 31–6 Drive: 6 plays, 71 yards, 1:01

Third Quarter

- UIW – 12:27 Jalen Walthall 50 yard pass from Zach Calzada, Brack Peacock kick
  UIW 38–6 Drive: 7 plays, 75 yards, 2:33
- UIW – 1:45 Roy Alexander 3 yard pass from Zach Calzada, Brack Peacock kick
  UIW 45–6 Drive: 10 plays, 78 yards, 4:05

Fourth Quarter

- HCU – 4:52 Jesse Valenzuela 16 yard run, Dillon Fedor kick
  UIW 45–13 Drive: 9 plays, 92 yards, 3:46
- HCU – 1:53 AJ Wilson 32 yard pass from Cutter Stewart, Dillon Fedor kick
  UIW 45–20 Drive: 5 plays, 85 yards, 1:31

Statistics	HCU	UIW
First downs	14	31
Total yards	64–301	89–573
Rushing yards	30–84	39–241
Passing yards	217	332
Passing: Comp–Att–Int	18–34–2	32–50–0
Time of possession	24:05	35:55

Team	Category	Player	Statistics
Houston Christian	Passing	Cutter Stewart	10/12, 145 yards, 1 TD
Houston Christian	Rushing	Calvin Hill	4 carries, 53 yards
Houston Christian	Receiving	AJ Wilson	3 receptions, 111 yards, 1 TD
Incarnate Word	Passing	Zach Calzada	29/44, 306 yards, 4 TD
Incarnate Word	Rushing	Dekalon Taylor	14 carries, 128 yards, 1 TD
Incarnate Word	Receiving	Roy Alexander	7 receptions, 89 yards, 3 TDs

=== Lamar ===
Uniform combination
Helmet	Jersey	Pants

Game Ten – Lamar Cardinals (5–4; 2–2) at No. 8 Incarnate Word Cardinals (7–2; 4–0)

Quarter	1	2	3	4	Total
Lamar	7	6	7	0	20
No. 8 Incarnate Word	10	10	14	7	41

at Gayle and Tom Benson Stadium, San Antonio, TX

- Date: November 9
- Game time: 2:00 pm
- Game weather: Temperature: 78 • Wind: NE 6 mph • Weather: Sunny
- Game attendance: 2,055
- Referee: Gary Leeper
- TV announcers (ESPN+): Karl Schoening (play-by-play), Sam Kaman (analyst), & Blair Villarreal (sideline)
- Box Score

Game information

First Quarter

- UIW – 9:22 Brack Peacock 41 yard field goal
  UIW 3–0 Drive: 9 plays, 59 yards, 3:37
- LU – 6:08 Devyn Gibbs 28 yard pass from Robert Coleman, Ben Woodard kick
  LU 7–3 Drive: 7 plays, 75 yards, 3:14
- UIW – 5:10 Roy Alexander 37 yard pass from Zach Calzada, Brack Peacock kick
  UIW 10–7 Drive: 3 plays, 75 yards, 0:58

Second Quarter

- UIW – 7:23 Roy Alexander 9 yard pass from Zach Calzada, Brack Peacock kick
  UIW 17–7 Drive: 4 plays, 42 yards, 1:48
- LU – 0:52 Damien Moore 11 yard pass from Robert Coleman, PAT failed
  UIW 17–13 Drive: 3 plays, 14 yards, 1:00
- UIW – 0:00 Brack Peacock 36 yard field goal
  UIW 20–13 Drive: 8 plays, 71 yards, 0:48

Third Quarter

- UIW – 10:44 Jackson Lowe 6 yard pass from Zach Calzada, Brack Peacock kick
  UIW 27–13 Drive: 12 plays, 75 yards, 4:16
- UIW – 9:25 Jalen Walthall 67 yard pass from Zach Calzada, Brack Peacock kick
  UIW 34–13 Drive: 1 play, 67 yards, 0:09
- LU – 2:02 Izaha Jones 47 yard pass from Robert Coleman, Ben Woodard kick
  UIW 34–20 Drive: 6 plays, 80 yards, 2:41

Fourth Quarter

- UIW – 7:39 Roy Alexander 56 yard pass from Zach Calzada, Brack Peacock kick
  UIW 41–20 Drive: 5 plays, 80 yards, 2:29

Statistics	LU	UIW
First downs	18	26
Total yards	61–330	72–606
Rushing yards	29–72	38–204
Passing yards	258	402
Passing: Comp–Att–Int	21–32–0	23–34–0
Time of possession	31:10	28:50

Team	Category	Player	Statistics
Lamar	Passing	Robert Coleman	17/22, 238 yards, 3 TD
Lamar	Rushing	Major Bowden	5 carries, 44 yards
Lamar	Receiving	Kyndon Fuselier	6 receptions, 90 yards
Incarnate Word	Passing	Zach Calzada	23/33, 402 yards, 5 TD
Incarnate Word	Rushing	Dekalon Taylor	15 carries, 98 yards
Incarnate Word	Receiving	Jalen Walthall	7 receptions, 165 yards, 1 TD

=== at Stephen F. Austin ===
Uniform combination
Helmet	Jersey	Pants

Game Eleven – No. 6 Incarnate Word Cardinals (8–2; 5–0) at Stephen F. Austin Lumberjacks (6–4; 4–2)

Quarter	1	2	3	4	Total
No. 6 Cardinals	3	10	7	7	27
Lumberjacks	6	3	3	8	20

at Homer Bryce Stadium, Nacogdoches, TX

- Date: November 16
- Game time: 2:03 p.m.
- Game weather: Sunny
- Game attendance: 4,116
- Referee: Craig Helser
- TV announcers (ESPN+): Chris Simmons (play-by-play) & Courtney Garcia (analyst)
- Box Score Recap

Game information

First Quarter

- SFA – 10:41 Chris Campos 30 yard field goal
  SFA 3–0 Drive: 8 plays, 27 yards, 3:00
- UIW – 5:50 Brack Peacock 22 yard field goal
  Tied 3–3 Drive: 5 plays, 56 yards, 1:47
- SFA – 0:47 Chris Campos 23 yard field goal
  SFA 6–3 Drive: 9 plays, 38 yards, 1:30

Second Quarter

- UIW – 12:33 Brack Peacock 38 yard field goal
  Tied 6–6 Drive: 4 plays, 2 yards, 1:34
- UIW – 4:52 Dekalon Taylor 7 yard run, Brack Peacock kick
  UIW 13–6 Drive: 5 plays, 42 yards, 2:39
- SFA – 0:05 Chris Campos 31 yard field goal
  UIW 13–9 Drive: 12 plays, 66 yards, 4:42

Third Quarter

- UIW – 8:26 Roy Alexander 13 yard run, Brack Peacock kick
  UIW 20–9 Drive: 8 plays, 84 yards, 2:24
- SFA – 4:29 Chris Campos 36 yard field goal
  UIW 20–12 Drive: 11 plays, 56 yards, 3:57

Fourth Quarter

- UIW – 8:59 Roy Alexander 5 yard pass from Zach Calzada, Brack Peacock kick
  UIW 27–12 Drive: 6 plays, 64 yards, 2:59
- SFA – 6:56 Kylon Harris 25 yard pass from Gavin Rutherford, Gavin Rutherford rush
  UIW 27–20 Drive: 5 plays, 79 yards, 1:57

Statistics	UIW	SFA
First downs	16	21
Total yards	66–390	79–331
Rushing yards	34–185	43–122
Passing yards	205	209
Passing: Comp–Att–Int	15–32–3	21–36–2
Time of possession	25:54	34:06

Team	Category	Player	Statistics
Incarnate Word	Passing	Zach Calzada	15/32, 205 yards, TD, 3 INT
Incarnate Word	Rushing	Dekalon Taylor	12 carries, 74 yards, TD
Incarnate Word	Receiving	Roy Alexander	6 receptions, 69 yards, TD
Stephen F. Austin	Passing	Gavin Rutherford	21/35, 209 yards, TD, 2 INT
Stephen F. Austin	Rushing	Gavin Rutherford	17 carries, 47 yards
Stephen F. Austin	Receiving	Kylon Harrs	6 receptions, 79 yards, TD

=== at East Texas A&M ===
Uniform combination
Helmet	Jersey	Pants

Game Twelve – No. 6 Incarnate Word Cardinals (9–2; 6–0) at East Texas A&M Lions (3–8; 2–3)

Quarter	1	2	3	4	Total
No. 6 Cardinals	7	10	0	21	38
Lions	7	10	7	0	24

at Ernest Hawkins Field at Memorial Stadium, Commerce, TX

- Date: November 23
- Game time: 1:00 pm
- Game weather: Temperature: 69 • Wind: S 11 mph • Weather: Sunny
- Game attendance: 3,724
- Referee: Austin Mezzacasa
- TV announcers (ESPN+): Greg Higgins, Adam Routon
- Box Score Recap

Game information

First Quarter

- UIW – 6:26 Zach Calzada 1 yard run, Brack Peacock kick
  UIW 7–0 Drive: 12 plays, 87 yards, 4:36
- ET – 3:01 Ron Peace 14 yard run, Luke Jackson kick
  Tied 7–7 Drive: 7 plays, 60 yards, 3:22

Second Quarter

- ET – 12:55 KJ Shankle 14 yard run, Luke Jackson kick
  ET 14–7 Drive: 8 plays, 72 yards, 3:23
- UIW – 8:30 Jalen Walthall 43 yard pass from Zach Calzada, Brack Peacock kick
  Tied 14–14 Drive: 1 play, 43 yards, 0:09
- ET – 2:57 Luke Jackson 39 yard field goal
  ET 17–14 Drive: 7 plays, 37 yards, 3:12
- UIW – 0:00 Brack Peacock 37 yard field goal
  Tied 17–17 Drive: 3 plays, 27 yards, 0:22

Third Quarter

- ET – 10:01 KJ Shankle 7 yard pass from Ron Peace, Luke Jackson kick
  ET 24–17 Drive: 14 plays, 90 yards, 5:17

Fourth Quarter

- UIW – 12:58 Lontrell Turner 5 yard run, Brack Peacock kick
  Tied 24–24 Drive: 14 plays, 90 yards, 5:17
- UIW – 7:48 Logan Compton 9 yard pass from Zach Calzada, Brack Peacock kick
  UIW 31–24 Drive: 6 plays, 71 yards, 1:41
- UIW – 2:43 Mason Pierce 18 yard pass from Zach Calzada, Brack Peacock kick
  UIW 38–24 Drive: 8 plays, 63 yards, 4:30

Statistics	UIW	ET
First downs	29	14
Total yards	83–496	64–231
Rushing yards	43–163	25–66
Passing yards	333	165
Passing: Comp–Att–Int	26–40–1	21–39–1
Time of possession	33:22	26:38

Team	Category	Player	Statistics
Incarnate Word	Passing	Zach Calzada	26/40, 333 yards, 3 TD, 1 INT
Incarnate Word	Rushing	Lontrell Turner	16 carries, 77 yards, 1 TD
Incarnate Word	Receiving	Jalen Walthall	7 receptions, 125 yards, 1 TD
East Texas A&M	Passing	Ron Peace	21/38, 165 yards, 1 TD, 1 INT
East Texas A&M	Rushing	KJ Shankle	12 carries, 56 yards, 1 TD
East Texas A&M	Receiving	Jaden Proctor	4 receptions, 49 yards

== FCS Playoffs ==
=== No. 12 Villanova Wildcats – Second Round ===
Uniform combination
Helmet	Jersey	Pants

Game Thirteen – No. 12 Villanova Wildcats (10–3) at No. 6 Incarnate Word Cardinals (10–2)

Quarter	1	2	3	4	Total
No. 12 Wildcats	0	3	3	0	6
No. 6 Cardinals	0	3	0	10	13

at Gayle and Tom Benson Stadium, San Antonio, TX

- Date: Saturday December 7, 2024
- Game time: 1:02 p.m.
- Game weather: Temperature: 46 • Wind: NE 6 mph • Weather: Rain
- Game attendance: 1,926
- Referee: Kelly Holman
- TV announcers (ESPN+): David Saltzman, Taylor McHargue
- Box Score AP Recap UIW Recap

Game information

First quarter

None

Second quarter

- UIW – 8:48 Brack Peacock 23 yard field goal
  UIW 3–0 Drive: 14 plays, 58 yards, 5:46
- VILL – 4:02 Ethan Gettman 49 yard field goal
  Tied 3–3 Drive: 4 plays, 8 yards, 1:08

Third quarter

- VILL – 2:24 Ethan Gettman 52 yard field goal
  VILL 6–3 Drive: 6 plays, 34 yards, 2:02

Fourth quarter

- UIW – 14:08 Roy Alexander 17 yard pass from Zach Calzada, Brack Peacock kick
  UIW 10–6 Drive 8 plays, 77 yards, 0:52
- UIW – 4:14 Brack Peacock 35 yard field goal
  UIW 13–6 Drive: 10 plays, 62 yards, 5:23

Statistics	VILL	UIW
First downs	9	25
Total yards	138	441
Rushing yards	35	259
Passing yards	103	182
Passing: Comp–Att–Int	12–27–1	22–37–0
Time of possession	23:45	36:15

Team	Category	Player	Statistics
Villanova	Passing	Connor Watkins	12/27, 103 yards, INT
Villanova	Rushing	David Avit	10 carries, 36 yards
Villanova	Receiving	Jaylan Sanchez	6 receptions, 54 yards
Incarnate Word	Passing	Zach Calzada	22/37, 182 yards, TD
Incarnate Word	Rushing	Lontrell Turner	18 carries, 120 yards
Incarnate Word	Receiving	Jalen Walthall	6 receptions, 75 yards

=== at No. 2 South Dakota State Jackrabbits – Quarterfinals ===
Uniform combination
Helmet	Jersey	Pants

Game Fourteen – No. 6 Incarnate Word Cardinals (11–2) at No. 2 South Dakota State Jackrabbits (11–2)

Quarter	1	2	3	4	Total
No. 6 Cardinals	0	0	14	0	14
No. 2 Jackrabbits	7	24	7	17	55

at Dana J. Dykhouse Stadium, Brookings, SD

- Date: Saturday December 14, 2024
- Game time: 11:02 a.m.
- Game weather: Temperature: 26 • Wind: SE 10 mph • Weather: Cloudy
- Game attendance: 8,671
- Referee: Paul Matt Overton
- TV announcers (ESPN/ESPN+): Jay Alter (play-by-play), Rocky Boiman (analyst), and Marilyn Payne (sideline)
- Box Score ESPN Recap UIW Recap SDSU Recap

Game information

First quarter

- SDSU – 4:30 Griffin Wilde 35 yard pass from Mark Gronowski, Hunter Dustman kick
  SDSU 7–0 Drive: 7 plays, 76 yards, 3:30

Second quarter

- SDSU – 9:59 Griffin Wilde 35 yard pass from Mark Gronowski, Hunter Dustman kick
  SDSU 14–0 Drive: 6 plays, 92 yards, 3:30
- SDSU – 6:03 Mark Gronowski 3 yard run, Hunter Dustman kick
  SDSU 21–0 Drive: 5 plays, 15 yards, 3:20
- SDSU – 1:02 Mark Gronowski 1 yard run, Hunter Dustman kick
  SDSU 28–0 Drive: 5 plays, 52 yards, 2:02
- SDSU – 0:01 Hunter Dustman 36 yard field goal
  SDSU 31–0 Drive: 6 plays, 12 yards, 0:28

Third quarter

- SDSU – 13:30 David Alpers 59 yard pass from Mark Gronowski, Hunter Dustman kick
  SDSU 38–0 Drive: 3 plays, 67 yards, 1:30
- UIW – 7:59 Roy Alexander 3 Yd pass from Zach Calzada, Brack Peacock kick
  SDSU 38–7 Drive: 15 plays, 69 yards, 5:31
- UIW – 3:38 Zach Calzada 1 yard run, Brack Peacock kick
  SDSU 38–14 Drive: 8 plays, 67 yards, 2:41

Fourth quarter

- SDSU – 13:21 Hunter Dustman 30 yard field goal
  SDSU 41–14 Drive: 4 plays, 1 yard, 0:57
- SDSU – 10:55 Kirby Vorhees 1 yard run, Hunter Dustman kick
  SDSU 48–14 Drive: 3 plays, 40 yards, 1:29
- SDSU – 6:32 Brenden Begeman 1 yard run, Hunter Dustman kick
  SDSU 55–14 Drive: 5 plays, 34 yards, 3:07

Statistics	UIW	SDSU
First downs	19	19
Total yards	345	476
Rushing yards	87	273
Passing yards	258	203
Passing: Comp–Att–Int	37–51–1	8–17–1
Time of possession	27:12	32:48

Team	Category	Player	Statistics
Incarnate Word	Passing	Zach Calzada	37/51, 258 yards, 1 TD, 1 INT
Incarnate Word	Rushing	Lontrell Turner	6 carries, 41 yards
Incarnate Word	Receiving	Roy Alexander	13 receptions, 92 yards, 1 TD
South Dakota State	Passing	Mark Gronowski	7/16, 174 yards, 3 TDs, 1 INT
South Dakota State	Rushing	Amar Johnson	18 carries, 132 yards
South Dakota State	Receiving	Griffin Wilde	3 receptions, 67 yards, 2 TDs

== Conference awards and honors ==
Cardinal players received player of the week recognition nine times during the season.

=== Weekly awards ===
Weekly honors
Honors	Player	Position	Date Awarded	Ref.
SLC Offensive Player of the Week	Jalen Walthall	WR	September 2, 2024	
SLC Offensive Player of the Week	Dekalon Taylor	RB	September 23, 2024	
SLC Defensive Player of the Week	Mister Williams	LB	September 23, 2024	
SLC Offensive Player of the Week	Zach Calzada	QB	October 14, 2024	
SLC Defensive Player of the Week	Dune Smith	LB	October 14, 2024	
SLC Offensive Player of the Week	Roy Alexander	WR	November 4, 2024	
SLC Offensive Player of the Week	Zach Calzada	QB	November 11, 2024	
SLC Defensive Player of the Week	Darius Sanders	DB	November 18, 2024	
SLC Offensive Player of the Week	Zach Calzada	QB	November 25, 2024	

=== Player and Coach of the Year Selections ===
Two Incarnate Word players and one coach were individual superlative award winners.

2024 Southland Conference Football Individual Superlative Winners

Football Player of the Year: Zach Calzada, UIW
Offensive Player of the Year: Jalen Walthall, UIW
Coach of the Year: Clint Killough, UIW

=== Postseason All–Southland Teams ===
The Southland Conference announced the 2024 all-conference football team selections on November 26, 2024. Incarnate Word had a total of 14 players selected.

Offense
1st Team

- Zach Calzada – Quarterback, GR
- Dekalon Taylor – Running back, JR
- Logan Compton – Tight end, JR
- Jalen Walthall – Wide receiver, JR
- Traveon Newsome – Offensive lineman, JR
- Mason Williams – Offensive lineman, GR

2nd Team

- Roy Alexander – Wide receiver, GR
- Nolan Hay – Offensive lineman, JR
- Rasheed Jackson – Offensive lineman, SO

Defense
1st Team

- Declan Williams – Defensive lineman, JR
- Darius Sanders – Defensive back, SR
- Mason Chambers – Defensive back, SR

2nd Team

- Devin Grant – Defensive lineman, JR
- Mister Williams – Linebacker, JR
- Dekalon Taylor – Punt returner, JR

== Rankings ==
Ranking movements Legend: ██ Increase in ranking ██ Decrease in ranking
	Week													
Poll	Pre	1	2	3	4	5	6	7	8	9	10	11	12	Final
STATS FCS	14	12	12	15	15	15	15	14	10	9	8	6	6	6
Coaches	15	11	14	18	18	15	15	13	11	10	8	6	6	6
