= Zach Calzada =

American football player (born 2000)

Frankfurt Galaxy
- Position: Quarterback
- CFL status: American

Personal information
- Born: November 8, 2000 (age 25); Atlanta, Georgia, U.S.
- Listed height: 6 ft 3 in (1.91 m)
- Listed weight: 222 lb (101 kg)

Career information
- High school: Lanier (Sugar Hill, Georgia)
- College: Texas A&M (2019–2021); Auburn (2022); Incarnate Word (2023–2024); Kentucky (2025)
- NFL draft: 2026: undrafted

Career history
- Ottawa Redblacks (2026)*; San Antonio Gunslingers (2026); Frankfurt Galaxy (2026–present)
- * Offseason or practice squad member only

Awards and highlights
- Southland Player of the Year (2024); 2× First-team All-Southland (2023, 2024); Southland Newcomer of the Year (2023)

Zach Calzada (born November 8, 2000) is an American professional football quarterback. He previously played college football for the Kentucky Wildcats, the Texas A&M Aggies, the Auburn Tigers, and the Incarnate Word Cardinals.

== Early life ==
Calzada grew up in Sugar Hill, Georgia and attended Lanier High School. He missed a large portion of his senior season after suffering a cracked rib and a punctured lung in the third game of the year. Calzada eventually returned to play and finished the season with 122 completions on 240 pass attempts for 14 touchdowns and was named an Under Armour All-American as Lanier reached the state semifinals. He finished his high school career with 3,429 yards and 29 touchdowns on 238 of 467 passing. Calzada was rated a three-star recruit and committed to play college football at Texas A&M over offers from North Carolina State, North Carolina, and Georgia.

== College career ==
=== Texas A&M ===
As a freshman, Calzada completed 12 of 24 pass attempts for 133 yards with two touchdowns and one interception. Calzada did not see any playing time during the 2020 season.

Calzada competed for the starting quarterback spot going into the 2021 season, but Haynes King was ultimately chosen. Calzada was named the Aggies starter following an injury to King in the second game of the season. He completed 21 of 31 passes for 285 yards with three touchdowns and one interception in a 41–38 upset victory over top-ranked Alabama. Following the game, Calzada was named the Southeastern Conference Offensive Player of the Week, the Davey O'Brien Award Player of the Week, and the Maxwell Award Player of the Week. Calzada finished the season with 2,185 passing yards, 17 touchdowns, and nine interceptions in ten starts.

On December 13, 2021, Calzada announced he would be transferring from Texas A&M, via social media.

=== Auburn ===
On January 6, 2022, Calzada announced he would transfer to Auburn University. On December 5, 2022, Calzada announced he would enter the transfer portal again.

=== Incarnate Word ===
On January 11, 2023, Calzada announced he would transfer to The University of the Incarnate Word, an FCS school located in San Antonio, Texas. He was named the Cardinals' starting quarterback entering his first season with the team.

=== Kentucky ===
On December 19, 2024, Calzada transferred to Kentucky. He began the 2025 season as the Wildcats' starting quarterback, making his debut against Toledo. In the 24–16 victory, he completed 10 of 23 passes for 85 yards and an interception while rushing for a touchdown. The following week against No. 20 Ole Miss, he suffered a shoulder injury in the fourth quarter of a 30–23 loss. He was subsequently replaced as the starting quarterback by Cutter Boley. Later that season, a private video Calzada had sent to a fan in response to criticism of his play was posted publicly on social media, showing him displaying a large amount of cash and boasting about the NIL money he had received from Kentucky. Calzada later issued a public apology on Instagram, writing, "I take full responsibility for the video I sent to someone on social media. I let my emotions get the best of me. It does not reflect the gratitude I should share as a member of the Kentucky Football team. I sincerely apologize to my teammates, coaches and our fans."

=== Statistics ===
| Season | Team | Games | | Record | Passing | | | | | | | Rushing | | | |
| Season | Team | GP | GS | Record | Cmp | Att | Pct | Yards | TD | Int | Rtg | Att | Yds | Avg | TD |
|---|---|---|---|---|---|---|---|---|---|---|---|---|---|---|---|
| 2019 | Texas A&M | 3 | 0 | — | 12 | 24 | 50.0 | 133 | 2 | 1 | 115.7 | 5 | 0 | 0.0 | 0 |
| 2020 | Texas A&M | Did not play | | | | | | | | | | | | | |
| 2021 | Texas A&M | 12 | 10 | 6–4 | 184 | 328 | 56.3 | 2,185 | 17 | 9 | 123.7 | 35 | −9 | −0.3 | 1 |
| 2022 | Auburn | Did not play | | | | | | | | | | | | | |
| 2023 | Incarnate Word | 9 | 8 | 6–2 | 188 | 283 | 66.4 | 2,598 | 19 | 9 | 159.3 | 34 | 57 | 1.7 | 5 |
| 2024 | Incarnate Word | 14 | 14 | 11–3 | 343 | 524 | 65.5 | 3,744 | 35 | 9 | 144.1 | 105 | 332 | 3.2 | 5 |
| 2025 | Kentucky | 3 | 2 | 1–1 | 28 | 58 | 48.3 | 238 | 0 | 2 | 75.8 | 14 | 23 | 1.6 | 1 |
| Career | | 41 | 34 | 24–10 | 759 | 1,220 | 62.2 | 8,945 | 73 | 30 | 138.8 | 193 | 403 | 1.6 | 12 |

== Professional career ==
Pre-draft measurables
| Height | Weight | Arm length | Hand span | Wingspan | 40-yard dash | 10-yard split | 20-yard split | 20-yard shuttle | Three-cone drill | Vertical jump | Broad jump |
|---|---|---|---|---|---|---|---|---|---|---|---|
| 6 ft 3 1/4 in (1.91 m) | 222 lb (101 kg) | 31 7/8 in (0.81 m) | 9 3/8 in (0.24 m) | 6 ft 4 3/8 in (1.94 m) | 4.69 s | 1.61 s | 2.73 s | 4.26 s | 7.25 s | 33.5 in (0.85 m) | 9 ft 6 in (2.90 m) |
All values from Pro Day

On April 28, 2026, Calzada signed with the Ottawa Redblacks of the Canadian Football League (CFL). He was released by the Redblacks on May 13.

On June 11, 2026, Calzada signed with the San Antonio Gunslingers of the Indoor Football League (IFL). He made his IFL debut two days later against the New Mexico Chupacabras, completing 12 of 17 passes for 187 yards and five touchdowns while rushing for 36 yards and three touchdowns in a 74–18 victory. He accounted for eight total touchdowns and was named the IFL Offensive Player of the Week for his performance. On the season, he appeared in three games, completing 34 of 72 passes for 404 yards with 10 touchdowns and four interceptions while rushing for 82 yards and three touchdowns.

On July 26, 2026, Calzada signed with the Frankfurt Galaxy in the European Football Alliance (EFA).

== Personal life ==
Calzada is a Cuban American. His sister Carolyn Calzada is a soccer player.
