= 2024 South Dakota Coyotes football team =

American college football season

2024 South Dakota Coyotes football

MVFC co-champion

NCAA Division I Semifinal, L 17–31 vs. Montana State
- Conference: Missouri Valley Football Conference

Ranking
- STATS: No. 4
- FCS Coaches: No. 4
- Record: 11–3 (7–1 MVFC)
- Head coach: Bob Nielson (9th season)
- Offensive coordinator: Josh Davis (2nd season)
- Offensive scheme: Pistol
- Defensive coordinator: Travis Johansen (6th season)
- Base defense: Multiple
- Home stadium: DakotaDome

2024 Missouri Valley Football Conference standings
	Conf.			Overall
Team	W		L	W		L
No. 1 North Dakota State +^	7	–	1	14	–	2
No. 3 South Dakota State +^	7	–	1	12	–	3
No. 4 South Dakota +^	7	–	1	11	–	3
Missouri State *	6	–	2	8	–	4
No. 11 Illinois State ^	6	–	2	10	–	4
Youngstown State	3	–	5	4	–	8
Indiana State	3	–	5	4	–	8
North Dakota	2	–	6	5	–	7
Southern Illinois	2	–	6	4	–	8
Northern Iowa	1	–	7	3	–	9
Murray State	0	–	8	1	–	11
+ – Conference co-champions; ^ – FCS playoff participant; * – Ineligible for 2024 FCS playoffs due to transition to the FBS; Rankings from STATS Poll

The 2024 South Dakota Coyotes football team represented the University of South Dakota as a member of the Missouri Valley Football Conference (MVFC) during the 2024 NCAA Division I FCS football season. The Coyotes were led by ninth-year head coach Bob Nielson and played their home games at the DakotaDome in Vermillion, South Dakota.

== Preseason ==
=== MVFC poll ===
The MVFC released it preseason prediction poll on July 22, 2024. The Coyotes were predicted to finish third in the conference.

== Schedule ==
Date	Time	Opponent	Rank	Site	TV	Result	Attendance	Source
August 29	7:00 p.m.	Northern State*	No. 5	DakotaDome; Vermillion, SD	ESPN+	W 45–3	7,435	
September 7	2:30 p.m.	at Wisconsin*	No. 6	Camp Randall Stadium; Madison, WI	FS1	L 13–27	76,069	
September 14	3:00 p.m.	at Portland State*	No. 6	Hillsboro Stadium; Portland, OR	ESPN+	Canceled		
September 21	1:00 p.m.	Drake*	No. 6	DakotaDome; Vermillion, SD	ESPN+	W 42–3	6,529	
September 28	1:00 p.m.	No. 17 Southern Illinois	No. 5	DakotaDome; Vermillion, SD	ESPN+	W 42–13	6,706	
October 5	2:00 p.m.	at Murray State	No. 4	Roy Stewart Stadium; Murray, KY	ESPN+	W 59–0	6,437	
October 12	2:00 p.m.	Northern Iowa	No. 4	DakotaDome; Vermillion, SD	ESPN+	W 42–17	8,934	
October 19	5:00 p.m.	at Youngstown State	No. 4	Stambaugh Stadium; Youngstown, OH	ESPN+	W 27–17	8,560	
October 26	6:30 p.m.	at No. 3 South Dakota State	No. 4	Dana J. Dykhouse Stadium; Brookings, SD (rivalry)	ESPNU	L 17–20 ^{OT}	19,351	
November 9	1:00 p.m.	Indiana State	No. 5	DakotaDome; Vermillion, SD	ESPN+	W 49–0	5,515	
November 16	12:00 p.m.	at North Dakota	No. 5	Alerus Center; Grand Forks, ND (Sitting Bull Trophy)	ESPN+	W 42–36	8,974	
November 23	1:00 p.m.	No. 1 North Dakota State	No. 4	DakotaDome; Vermillion, SD	ESPN+	W 29–28	9,062	
December 7	2:00 p.m.	No. 14 Tarleton State*	No. 4	DakotaDome; Vermillion, SD (NCAA Division I Second Round)	ESPN+	W 42–31	6,231	
December 14	2:00 p.m.	No. 5 UC Davis*	No. 4	DakotaDome; Vermillion, SD (NCAA Division I Quarterfinal)	ESPN+	W 35–21	6,135	
December 21	2:30 p.m.	at No. 1 Montana State*	No. 4	Bobcat Stadium; Bozeman, MT (NCAA Division I Semifinal)	ABC	L 17–31	20,557	
*Non-conference game; Rankings from STATS Poll released prior to the game; All times are in Central time

== Game summaries ==
=== Northern State (DII) ===
Game One – Northern State Wolves (DII) (0–0) vs South Dakota Coyotes (0–0) – Game summary

Quarter	1	2	3	4	Total
Wolves (DII)	3	0	0	0	3
No. 5 Coyotes	10	21	7	7	45

at DakotaDome • Vermillion, SD

- Date: Thursday August 29, 2024
- Game time: 7:00 p.m. CST
- Game weather: None (played indoors)
- TV: ESPN+

Game information

First quarter
Second quarter
Third quarter
Fourth quarter

Statistics	NORST	SDAK
First downs	11	20
Total yards	207	351
Rushing yards	147	266
Passing yards	60	85
Passing: Comp–Att–Int	8-13-2	9-13-0
Time of possession	31:55	28:05

Team	Category	Player	Statistics
Northern State	Passing	Daniel Britt	8-11 60 Yards 1 INT
Northern State	Rushing	Hank Craft	11 Carries 68 Yards
Northern State	Receiving	Tanner Branson	2 Catches 25 Yards
South Dakota	Passing	Aidan Bouman	9-12 85 Yards
South Dakota	Rushing	Charles Pierre Jr	13 Carries 136 Yards 2 TD
South Dakota	Receiving	Carter Bell	3 Catches 32 Yards

=== at Wisconsin (FBS) ===
Game Two – No. 6 South Dakota Coyotes (1–0) at Wisconsin Badgers (FBS) (1–0) – Game summary

Quarter	1	2	3	4	Total
No. 6 Coyotes	0	3	10	0	13
Badgers (FBS)	14	3	3	7	27

at Camp Randall Stadium • Madison, WI

- Date: Saturday September 7, 2024
- Game time: 2:30 PM CST
- Game weather: Sunny, 62 °F (17 °C); Wind: N 9 mph
- Game attendance: 76,069
- Referee: David Siegle
- TV announcers (FS1): Eric Collins (play-by-play) and Spencer Tillman (analyst)

Game information

First quarter

- WIS – Chez Mellusi 9-yard run (Nathanial Vakos kick), 12:03 Wisconsin 7–0 Drive: 7 plays, 75 yards, 2:52.
- WIS – CJ Williams 50-yard pass from Tyler Van Dyke (Nathanial Vakos kick), 4:48 Wisconsin 14–0 Drive: 3 plays, 58 yards, 1:23.

Second quarter

- SD – Will Leyland 25-yard field goal, 7:14. Wisconsin 14–3. Drive: 11 plays, 57 yards, 5:48.
- WIS – Nathanial Vakos 24-yard field goal, 0:07. Wisconsin 17–3. Drive: 13 plays, 68 yards, 6:56.

Third quarter

- SD – Keyondray Jones-Logan 35-yard run (Will Leyland kick), 12:38 Wisconsin 17–10 Drive: 4 plays, 75 yards, 2:22.
- SD – Will Leyland 32-yard field goal, 5:06. Wisconsin 17–13. Drive: 5 plays, -7 yards, 1:44.
- WIS – Nathanial Vakos 50-yard field goal, 2:21. Wisconsin 20–13. Drive: 7 plays, 49 yards, 2:34.

Fourth quarter

- WIS – Chez Mellusi 1-yard run (Nathanial Vakos kick), 7:41 Wisconsin 27–13 Drive: 11 plays, 85 yards, 4:51.

Statistics	SDAK	WIS
First downs	13	23
Total yards	237	385
Rushing yards	123	171
Passing yards	114	214
Passing: Comp–Att–Int	12–23–0	17–27–0
Time of possession	27:31	32:29

Team	Category	Player	Statistics
South Dakota	Passing	Aidan Bouman	12/23, 114 yards
South Dakota	Rushing	Charles Pierre Jr.	12 carries, 83 yards
South Dakota	Receiving	Travis Theis	4 receptions, 43 yards
Wisconsin	Passing	Tyler Van Dyke	17/27, 214 yards, TD
Wisconsin	Rushing	Chez Mellusi	16 carries, 60 yards, 2 TD
Wisconsin	Receiving	CJ Williams	2 receptions, 53 yards, TD

=== at Portland State ===
Game Three – No. 6 South Dakota Coyotes (1–1) at Portland State Vikings (0–2) – Game summary

Quarter	1	2	3	4	Total
No. 6 Coyotes	0	0	0	0	0
Vikings	0	0	0	0	0

at Hillsboro Stadium • Hillsboro, OR

- Date: Saturday September 14, 2024
- Game time: 3:00 PM CST
- Game weather: 0 °F (−18 °C)
- TV announcers (ESPN+): TBD

Game information

First quarter
Second quarter
Third quarter
Fourth quarter

Statistics	SDAK	PRST
First downs		
Total yards		
Rushing yards		
Passing yards		
Passing: Comp–Att–Int		
Time of possession		

Team	Category	Player	Statistics
South Dakota	Passing		
South Dakota	Rushing		
South Dakota	Receiving		
Portland State	Passing		
Portland State	Rushing		
Portland State	Receiving		

=== Drake ===
Game Four – Drake Bulldogs (1–0) at No. 6 South Dakota Coyotes (1–1) – Game summary

Quarter	1	2	3	4	Total
Bulldogs	0	3	0	0	3
No. 6 Coyotes	14	14	7	7	42

at DakotaDome • Vermillion, SD

- Date: Saturday September 21, 2024
- Game time: 1:00 PM CST
- Game weather: None (played indoors)
- Game attendance: 6,529
- Referee: Jason Perkins
- TV announcers (ESPN+): Jay Elsen (play-by-play) and Andre Fields (analyst)

Game information

First quarter

- 14:47 USD – Keyondray Jones-Logan 99-yard kickoff return (Will Leyland kick) (USD 7–0)
- 3:51 USD – Travis Theis 25-yard run (Will Leyland kick) (Drive: 5 plays, 58 yards, 2:39; USD 14–0)

Second quarter

- 12:17 Drake – Shane Dunning 23-yard field goal (Drive: 6 plays, 62 yards, 1:05; USD 14–3)
- 8:44 USD – Carter Bell 6-yard run (Will Leyland kick) (Drive: 7 plays, 71 yards, 3:33; USD 21–3)
- 3:14 USD – Charles Pierre, Jr. 1-yard run (Will Leyland kick) (Drive: 7 plays, 46 yards, 3:53; USD 28–3)

Third quarter

- 3:14 USD – Travis Theis Jr. 4-yard run (Will Leyland kick) (Drive: 6 plays, 52 yards, 3:01; USD 35–3)

Fourth quarter

- 3:14 USD – Charles Pierre, Jr. 20-yard pass from Aidan Bouman (Will Leyland kick) (Drive: 9 plays, 80 yards, 5:01; USD 42–3)

Statistics	DRKE	SDAK
First downs	18	25
Total yards	211	411
Rushing yards	93	192
Passing yards	118	219
Passing: Comp–Att–Int	18–33–1	18–26–1
Time of possession	32:17	27:43

Team	Category	Player	Statistics
Drake	Passing	Luke Bailey	16/29, 107 yards, INT
Drake	Rushing	Dorian Boyland	8 carries, 51 yards
Drake	Receiving	Trey Radocha	7 receptions, 56 yards
South Dakota	Passing	Aidan Bouman	18/24, 219 yards, TD
South Dakota	Rushing	Travis Theis	9 carries, 94 yards, 2 TD
South Dakota	Receiving	Carter Bell	4 receptions, 56 yards

=== No. 17 Southern Illinois ===
Game Five – No. 17 Southern Illinois Salukis (2–2) vs No. 5 South Dakota Coyotes (2–1) – Game summary

Quarter	1	2	3	4	Total
No. 17 Salukis	0	7	6	0	13
No. 5 Coyotes	14	21	0	7	42

at DakotaDome • Vermillion, SD

- Date: September 28, 2024
- Game time: 1:00 p.m. CST
- Game weather: None (played indoors)
- Game attendance: 6,706
- TV: ESPN+

Game information

First quarter
Second quarter
Third quarter
Fourth quarter

Statistics	SIU	SDAK
First downs	16	24
Total yards	366	549
Rushing yards	60	302
Passing yards	306	247
Passing: Comp–Att–Int	23-41	11-17
Time of possession	24:41	35:19

Team	Category	Player	Statistics
Southern Illinois	Passing	Hunter Simmons	23-41, 306 yards, 2 TD
Southern Illinois	Rushing	Shaun Lester Jr	10 carries, 31 yards
Southern Illinois	Receiving	Keontez Lewis	3 catches, 88 yards, TD
South Dakota	Passing	Aidan Bouman	11-17, 245 yards, 2 TD
South Dakota	Rushing	Travis Theis	25 carries, 147 yards, 2 TD
South Dakota	Receiving	JJ Galbreath	2 catches, 100 yards, TD

=== at Murray State ===
Game Six – No. 4 South Dakota Coyotes (3–1) vs Murray State Racers (1–3) – Game summary

Quarter	1	2	3	4	Total
No. 4 Coyotes	21	3	21	14	59
Racers	0	0	0	0	0

at Roy Stewart Stadium • Murray, KY

- Date: Saturday October 5, 2024
- Game time: 2:00 p.m.
- Game weather: 0 °F (−18 °C)
- Game attendance: 6.437
- TV: ESPN+

Game information

First quarter
Second quarter
Third quarter
Fourth quarter

Statistics	SDAK	MURR
First downs	26	10
Total yards	582	213
Rushing yards	361	90
Passing yards	221	123
Passing: Comp–Att–Int	16-22-1	13-21-2
Time of possession	36:20	23:40

Team	Category	Player	Statistics
South Dakota	Passing	Aidan Bouman	16-22, 221 yards, TD, INT
South Dakota	Rushing	Travis Theis	14 carries, 132 yards, 2 TD
South Dakota	Receiving	Quaron Adams	3 receptions, 83 yards
Murray State	Passing	Jayden Johannsen	7-13, 84 yards, 2 INT
Murray State	Rushing	Jawaun Northington	11 carries, 46 yards
Murray State	Receiving	JK Carter	3 receptions, 54 yards

=== Northern Iowa ===
Game Seven – Northern Iowa Panthers (2–3) vs No. 4 South Dakota Coyotes (4–1) – Game summary

Quarter	1	2	3	4	Total
Panthers	7	3	7	0	17
No. 4 Coyotes	7	21	14	0	42

at DakotaDome • Vermillion, SD

- Date: Saturday October 12, 2024
- Game time: 2:00 p.m.
- Game weather: None (played indoors)
- TV: ESPN+

Game information

First quarter
Second quarter
Third quarter
Fourth quarter

Statistics	UNI	SDAK
First downs	16	24
Total yards	311	513
Rushing yards	56	192
Passing yards	255	321
Passing: Comp–Att–Int	19-28-1	18-21-0
Time of possession	24:31	35:29

Team	Category	Player	Statistics
Northern Iowa	Passing	Matthew Schecklman	18-26 250 yards 1 TD 1 INT
Northern Iowa	Rushing	Tye Edwards	19 carries 53 yards 1 TD
Northern Iowa	Receiving	Desmond Hutson	4 Receptions 94 Yards
South Dakota	Passing	Aidan Bouman	17-20 284 Yards 2 TD
South Dakota	Rushing	Charles Pierre Jr	21 Carries 105 Yards 2 TD
South Dakota	Receiving	AJ Coons	2 Receptions 61 Yards 1 TD

=== at Youngstown State ===
Game Eight – No. 4 South Dakota Coyotes (5–1) at Youngstown State Penguins (2–5) – Game summary

Quarter	1	2	3	4	Total
No. 4 Coyotes	0	14	10	3	27
Penguins	7	10	0	0	17

at Stambaugh Stadium, Youngstown, OH

- Date: Saturday October 19, 2024
- Game time: 5:00 p.m.
- Game weather: Clear • Temperature: 64 °F (18 °C) • Wind: W at 3 miles per hour (4.8 km/h)
- Game attendance: 8,560
- Referee: Jason Berg
- TV announcers (ESPN+): TBD

Game information

First quarter
Second quarter
Third quarter
Fourth quarter

Statistics	SDAK	YSU
First downs	19	22
Total yards	415	346
Rushing yards	192	138
Passing yards	223	208
Passing: Comp–Att–Int	12-18-0	22-32-0
Time of possession	26:01	33:59

Team	Category	Player	Statistics
South Dakota	Passing	Aidan Bouman	12-18, 223 yards, TD
South Dakota	Rushing	Charles Pierre Jr	21 carries, 153 yards 2 TD
South Dakota	Receiving	JJ Galbreath	3 receptions, 79 yards
Youngstown State	Passing	Beau Brungard	22-31, 208 yards, TD
Youngstown State	Rushing	Beau Brungard	16 carries, 69 yards, TD
Youngstown State	Receiving	Max Tomczak	9 receptions, 90 yards

=== at No. 3 South Dakota State (rivalry) ===
Game Nine – No. 4 South Dakota Coyotes (6–1) at No. 3 South Dakota State Jackrabbits (5–2) – Game summary

Quarter	1	2	3	4	OT	Total
No. 4 Coyotes	7	0	0	7	3	17
No. 3 Jackrabbits	7	7	0	0	6	20

at Dana J. Dykhouse Stadium, Brookings, SD

- Date: Saturday October 26, 2024
- Game time: 6:30 p.m.
- Game weather: 53 °F (12 °C), Clear, Wind S 15 mph (24 km/h)
- Game attendance: 19,351
- Referee: David Hergert
- TV announcers (ESPNU): Lowell Galindo (play-by-play) and Fozzy Whittaker (analyst)

Game information

First quarter

- (9:33) USD – Travis Theis 1-yard run, Will Leyland kick (Drive: 10 plays, 65 yards, 5:27; South Dakota 7–0)
- (6:13) SDSU – Mark Gronowski 1-yard run, Hunter Dustman kick (Drive: 7 plays, 80 yards, 3:20; Tied 7–7)

Second quarter

- (4:53) SDSU – Amar Johnson 1-yard run, Hunter Dustman kick (Drive: 8 plays, 46 yards, 3:58; South Dakota State 14–7)

Third quarter

No scoring plays

Fourth quarter

- (4:41) USD – Mi'Quise Grace 15-yard fumble recovery, Will Leyland kick (Tied 14–14)
- (0:00) USD – Will Leyland 40-yard field goal (Drive: 4 plays, 2 yards, 0:00; South Dakota 17–14)

Overtime

- (0:00) SDSU – Amar Johnson 3-yard run (Drive: 8 plays, 25 yards, 0:00; South Dakota State 20–17)

Statistics	SDAK	SDST
First downs	18	19
Total yards	275	329
Rushing yards	82	166
Passing yards	193	163
Passing: Comp–Att–Int	21-35-1	21-29-0
Time of possession	28:22	31:38

Team	Category	Player	Statistics
South Dakota	Passing	Aidan Bouman	20-32, 163 yards
South Dakota	Rushing	Travis Theis	15 carries, 78 yards, TD
South Dakota	Receiving	Jack Martens	3 receptions, 66 yards
South Dakota State	Passing	Mark Gronowski	20-27, 163 yards
South Dakota State	Rushing	Angel Johnson	14 carries, 81 yards
South Dakota State	Receiving	Griffin Wilde	5 receptions, 61 yards

=== Indiana State ===
Game Ten – Indiana State Sycamores (4–5) vs No. 5 South Dakota Coyotes (6–2) – Game summary

Quarter	1	2	3	4	Total
Sycamores	0	0	0	0	0
No. 5 Coyotes	7	14	14	14	49

at DakotaDome • Vermillion, SD

- Date: Saturday November 9, 2024
- Game time: 1:00 p.m.
- Game weather: None (played indoors)
- Game attendance: 5,515
- TV: ESPN+

Game information

First quarter
Second quarter
Third quarter
Fourth quarter

Statistics	INST	SDAK
First downs	5	21
Total yards	129	622
Rushing yards	-3	317
Passing yards	132	305
Passing: Comp–Att–Int	12-23-0	15-21-0
Time of possession	27:15	32:45

Team	Category	Player	Statistics
Indiana State	Passing	Elijah Owens	11-21, 131 yards
Indiana State	Rushing	Shen Butler-Lawson	10 carries, 15 yards
Indiana State	Receiving	Zavion Taylor	4 receptions, 66 yards
South Dakota	Passing	Aidan Bouman	14-20, 238 yards, 2 TD
South Dakota	Rushing	Charles Pierre Jr.	11 carries, 165 yards, 2 TD
South Dakota	Receiving	Quaron Adams	2 receptions, 133 yards, 2 TD

=== at North Dakota (Sitting Bull Trophy) ===
Game Eleven – No. 5 South Dakota Coyotes (7–2) at North Dakota Fighting Hawks (5–5) – Game summary

Quarter	1	2	3	4	Total
No. 5 Coyotes	0	17	10	15	42
Fighting Hawks	7	14	0	15	36

at Alerus Center, Grand Forks, ND

- Date: Saturday November 16, 2024
- Game time: 12:00 p.m.
- Game weather: None (played indoors)
- Game attendance: 8,974
- TV: ESPN+

Game information

First quarter
Second quarter
Third quarter
Fourth quarter

Statistics	SDAK	UND
First downs	25	23
Total yards	512	323
Rushing yards	322	143
Passing yards	190	180
Passing: Comp–Att–Int	20-31-0	
Time of possession	32:44	27:16

Team	Category	Player	Statistics
South Dakota	Passing	Aidan Bouman	15-21 190 Yards 3 TD 1 INT
South Dakota	Rushing	Charles Pierre Jr	15 Carries 173 Yards 1 TD
South Dakota	Receiving	Charles Pierre Jr	4 Receptions 75 Yards 1 TD
North Dakota	Passing	Simon Roufo	20-30 180 Yards 3 TD
North Dakota	Rushing	Sawyer Seidl	7 Carries 68 Yards 1 TD
North Dakota	Receiving	Bo Belquist	10 Receptions 96 Yards 1 TD

=== No. 1 North Dakota State ===
Game Twelve – No. 1 North Dakota State Bison (10–1) vs No. 4 South Dakota Coyotes (8–2) – Game summary

Quarter	1	2	3	4	Total
No. 1 Bison	0	14	7	7	28
No. 4 Coyotes	7	7	3	12	29

at DakotaDome • Vermillion, SD

- Date: Saturday November 23, 2024
- Game time: 1:00 p.m.
- Game weather: None (played indoors)
- Game attendance: 9,062
- Referee: Aaron Adams
- TV: ESPN+

Game information

First quarter

- (6:35) USD – Travis Theis 6-yard run, Will Leyland kick (Drive: 11 plays, 80 yards, 6:14; South Dakota 7–0)

Second quarter

- (12:44) USD – Travis Theis 14-yard run, Will Leyland kick (Drive: 7 plays, 73 yards, 4:13; South Dakota 14–0)
- (2:39) NDSU – Braylon Henderson 23-yard pass from Cam Miller, Griffin Crosa kick (Drive: 6 plays, 66 yards, 2:57; South Dakota 14–7)
- (0:26) NDSU – CharMar Brown 3-yard run, Griffin Crosa kick (Drive: 9 plays, 83 yards, 1:17; Tied 14–14)

Third quarter

- (10:21) USD – Will Leyland 37-yard field goal (Drive: 10 plays, 51 yards, 4:39; South Dakota 17–14)
- (4:48) NDSU – Cam Miller 2-yard run, Griffin Crosa kick (Drive: 10 plays, 80 yards, 5:29; North Dakota State 21–17)

Fourth quarter

- (4:10) NDSU – CharMar Brown 1-yard run, Griffin Crosa kick (Drive: 20 plays, 99 yards, 10:53; North Dakota State 28–17)
- (3:22) USD – Jack Martens 40-yard pass from Aidan Bouman (Drive: 6 plays, 71 yards, 0:48; North Dakota State 28–23)
- (0:12) USD – Javion Phelps 25-yard pass from Aidan Bouman (Drive: 6 plays, 58 yards, 1:04; South Dakota 29–28)

Statistics	NDSU	SDAK
First downs	19	23
Total yards	340	391
Rushing yards	166	119
Passing yards	174	272
Passing: Comp–Att–Int	10–22–0	18–30–0
Time of possession	30:46	29:14

Team	Category	Player	Statistics
North Dakota State	Passing	Cam Miller	10/22, 174 yards, TD
North Dakota State	Rushing	Cam Miller	19 carries, 82 yards, TD
North Dakota State	Receiving	RaJa Nelson	3 receptions, 48 yards
South Dakota	Passing	Aidan Bouman	18/30, 272 yards, 2 TD
South Dakota	Rushing	Travis Theis	13 carries, 66 yards, 2 TD
South Dakota	Receiving	Javion Phelps	3 receptions, 79 yards, TD

=== No. 14 Tarleton State (NCAA Division I Playoff–Second round) ===
NCAA Division I Playoff–Second round
No. 14 Tarleton State Texans (10–3) vs No. 4 South Dakota Coyotes (9–2) – Game summary

Quarter	1	2	3	4	Total
No. 14 Texans	7	14	7	3	31
No. 4 Coyotes	7	7	7	21	42

at DakotaDome • Vermillion, SD

- Date: Saturday December 7, 2024
- Game time: 2:00 p.m.
- Game attendance: 6,231
- TV: ESPN+

Game information

First quarter
Second quarter
Third quarter
Fourth quarter

Statistics	TAR	SDAK
First downs		
Total yards		
Rushing yards		
Passing yards		
Passing: Comp–Att–Int		
Time of possession		

Team	Category	Player	Statistics
Tarleton State	Passing		
Tarleton State	Rushing		
Tarleton State	Receiving		
South Dakota	Passing		
South Dakota	Rushing		
South Dakota	Receiving		

=== No. 5 UC Davis (NCAA Division I Playoff-Quarterfinal) ===
NCAA Division I Playoff–Quarterfinal
No. 5 UC Davis Aggies (11–2) vs No. 4 South Dakota Coyotes (10–2) – Game summary

Quarter	1	2	3	4	Total
No. 5 Aggies	7	7	0	7	21
No. 4 Coyotes	14	7	7	7	35

at DakotaDome • Vermillion, SD

- Date: Saturday December 14, 2024
- Game time: 2:00 p.m.
- Game attendance: 6,135
- TV: ESPN+

Game information

First quarter
Second quarter
Third quarter
Fourth quarter

Statistics	UCD	SDAK
First downs		
Total yards		
Rushing yards		
Passing yards		
Passing: Comp–Att–Int		
Time of possession		

Team	Category	Player	Statistics
UC Davis	Passing		
UC Davis	Rushing		
UC Davis	Receiving		
South Dakota	Passing		
South Dakota	Rushing		
South Dakota	Receiving		

=== at No. 1 Montana State (NCAA Division I Playoff–Semifinal) ===
NCAA Division I Playoff–Semifinal
No. 4 South Dakota Coyotes (11–2) at No. 1 Montana State (14–0) – Game summary

Quarter	1	2	3	4	Total
No. 4 Coyotes	7	7	3	0	17
No. 1 Bobcats	14	10	7	0	31

at Bobcat Stadium • Bozeman, MT

- Date: Saturday December 21, 2024
- Game time: 2:30 p.m.
- Game attendance: 20,557
- TV: ABC

Game information

First quarter

- (11:56) MTST – Taco Dowler 34 yard pass from Tommy Mellott, Myles Sansted kick (Drive: 6 plays, 65 yards, 3:04; MTST 7–0)
- (8:52) SDAK – Travis Theis 55 yard run, Will Leyland kick (Drive: 5 plays, 89 yards, 3:04; Tied 7–7)
- (1:04) MTST – Tommy Mellott 5 yard run, Myles Sansted kick (Drive: 6 plays, 47 yards, 2:46; MTST 14–7)

Second quarter

- (14:51) SDAK – Charles Pierre Jr. 45 yard run, Will Leyland kick (Drive: 3 plays, 75 yards, 1:13; Tied 14–14)
- (8:24) MTST – Scottre Humphrey 1 yard run, Myles Sansted kick (Drive: 12 plays, 74 yards, 6:27; MTST 21–14)
- (0:08) MTST – Myles Sansted 28 yard field goal (Drive: 15 plays, 64 yards, 5:03; MTST 24–14)

Third quarter

- (10:30) MTST – Tommy Mellott 41 yard run, Myles Sansted kick (Drive: 5 plays, 80 yards, 2:51; MTST 31–14)
- (2:55) SDAK – Will Leyland 46 yard field goal (Drive: 6 plays, 20 yards, 2:11; MTST 31–17)

Fourth quarter

- No scoring plays

Statistics	SDAK	MTST
First downs	16	20
Total yards	371	356
Rushing yards	135	222
Passing yards	236	134
Passing: Comp–Att–Int	20-29-0	8-17-0
Time of possession	27:56	32:04

Team	Category	Player	Statistics
South Dakota	Passing	Aidan Bouman	20/29, 236 yards
South Dakota	Rushing	Travis Theis	14 carries, 110 yards, TD
South Dakota	Receiving	Travis Theis	7 receptions, 80 yards
Montana State	Passing	Tommy Mellott	8/17, 134 yards, TD
Montana State	Rushing	Tommy Mellott	17 carries, 125 yards, 2 TD
Montana State	Receiving	Taco Dowler	4 receptions, 94 yards, TD
