= Jalen Walthall =

American football player (born 2002)

Profile
- Position: Wide receiver

Personal information
- Born: October 14, 2002 (age 24)
- Listed height: 6 ft 1 in (1.85 m)
- Listed weight: 191 lb (87 kg)

Career information
- High school: Manvel (Manvel, Texas)
- College: Hawaii (2021–2023); Incarnate Word (2024–2025)
- NFL draft: 2026: undrafted

Career history
- Houston Texans (2026)*; New York Jets (2026)*
- * Offseason or practice squad member only

Awards and highlights
- First-team FCS All-American (2024)
- Stats at Pro Football Reference

Jalen Walthall (born October 14, 2002) is an American professional football wide receiver. He played college football for the Incarnate Word Cardinals and Hawaii Rainbow Warriors.

== Early life ==
Walthall attended Manvel High School in Manvel, Texas, and committed to play college football for the Hawaii Rainbow Warriors.

== College career ==
=== Hawaii ===
As a freshman in 2021, Walthall was redshirted. In 2022, he hauled in 27 passes for 333 yards and a touchdown. Mid-way through the 2023 season, Walthall announced he was entering the NCAA transfer portal and sitting out the remainder of the season after posting ten receptions for 127 yards and a touchdown.

=== Incarnate Ward ===
Walthall transferred to play for the Incarnate Word Cardinals. In week 10 of the 2024 season, Walthall went viral for his touchdown celebration on a 50-yard reception in a victory over Houston Christian. He finished the 2024 season with 85 receptions for 1,290 yards and 14 touchdowns. For his performance during the 2024 season, Walthall was named first-team all-Southland Conference, first-team FCS all-American by the AP, the Southland Conference Offensive Player of the Year, and a finalist for the Walter Payton Award. During his senior season in 2025, he recorded 847 yards and eight touchdowns. After the conclusion of the season he declared for the 2026 NFL draft and accepted an invite to the 2026 East-West Shrine Bowl.

== Professional career ==
Pre-draft measurables
Height	Weight	Arm length	Hand span	Wingspan	40-yard dash	10-yard split	20-yard split	20-yard shuttle	Three-cone drill	Vertical jump	Broad jump
6 ft 0 3/4 in (1.85 m)	191 lb (87 kg)	31 1/4 in (0.79 m)	9 in (0.23 m)	6 ft 5 7/8 in (1.98 m)	4.57 s	1.59 s	2.65 s	4.39 s	7.03 s	38.5 in (0.98 m)	10 ft 11 in (3.33 m)
All values from NFL Combine/Pro Day

=== Houston Texans ===
On May 8, 2026, Walthall signed with the Houston Texans as an undrafted free agent. On June 4, Walthall was waived by the Texans.

=== New York Jets ===
On June 8, 2026, Walthall signed with the New York Jets. On July 30, he was waived by the Jets.
