= Todd Stepsis =

American football coach

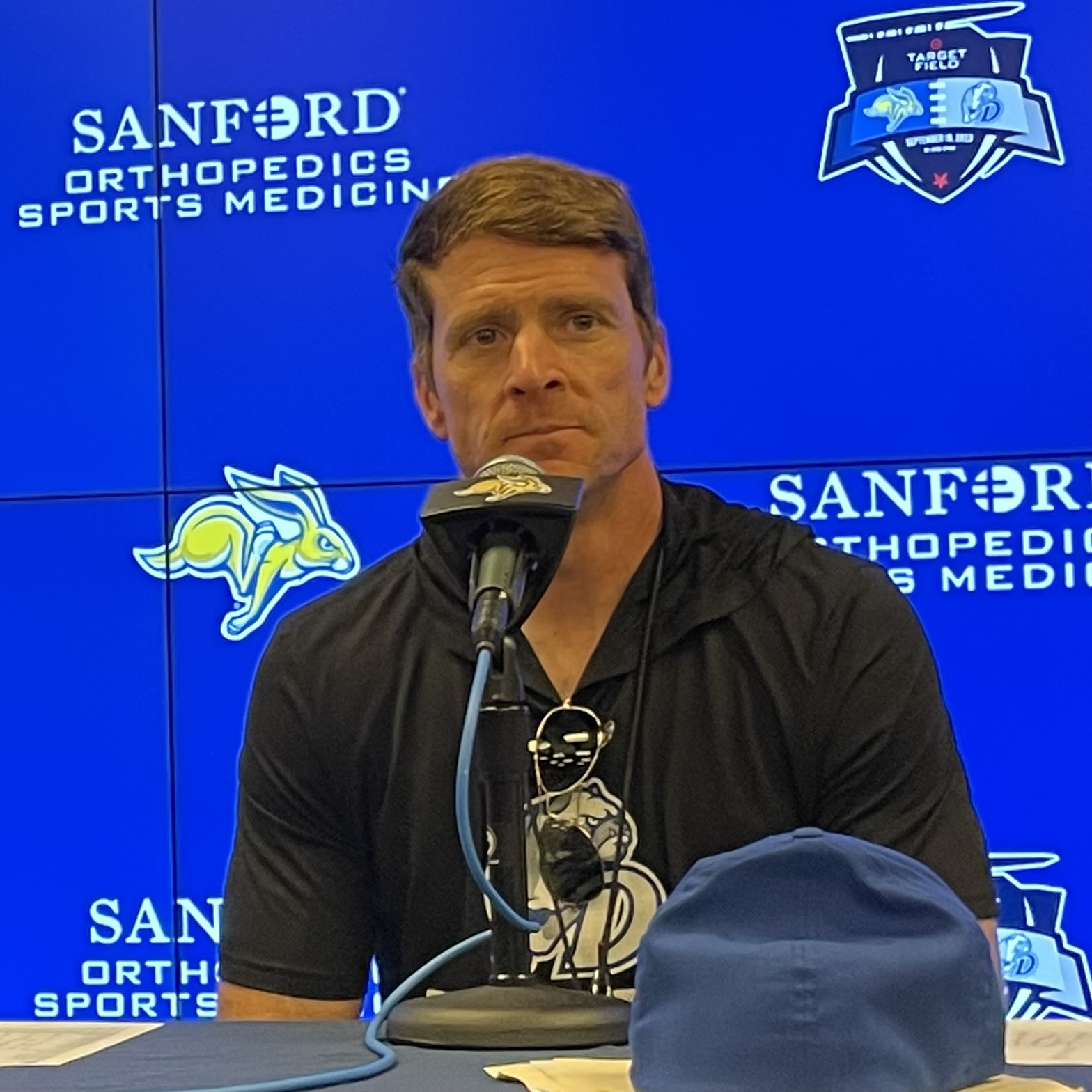
- Stepsis at a post-game presser in 2023

Current position
- Title: Head coach
- Team: Northern Iowa
- Conference: MVFC
- Record: 3–9

Biographical details
- Born: May 1, 1977 (age 49)
- Education: Ashland (1999)

Coaching career (HC unless noted)
- 1999: Otterbein (assistant)
- 2000–2008: Capital (assistant)
- 2008–2013: Saginaw Valley State (DC)
- 2014–2018: Drake (DC)
- 2019–2024: Drake
- 2025–present: Northern Iowa

Head coaching record
- Overall: 32–41
- Tournaments: 0–2

Accomplishments and honors

Championships
- 2 PFL (2023, 2024)

Awards
- 2 PFL Coach of the Year (2023), (2024)

Todd Stepsis (born May 1, 1977) is an American college football coach. He is the head football coach at University of Northern Iowa, a position he has held since the 2025 season. Stepsis served as the head football coach at Drake University from 2019 to 2024.

== Coaching career ==
Following his career at Ashland University, Stepsis began his coaching career at Otterbein University in 1999. He then spent eight seasons at Capital University and six seasons as defensive coordinator at Saginaw Valley State University. He joined the staff at Drake in the same position for the 2014 season. Following five seasons in this role, Stepsis was promoted to head coach following the resignation of Rick Fox following the 2018 season. He was previously the defensive coordinator.

Following Drake’s first playoff appearance in 2023, Stepsis was awarded the Pioneer Football League Coach of the Year Award.

== Personal life ==
A Shelby, Ohio native, Stepsis was a member of the football team and graduated from Ashland University. He majored in special education, and also got a master's degree in sports education in 1999. He and his wife, Angie, have two daughters, Addison and Avery. He is also father to a son, Zander, and daughter, Zoe.

== Head coaching record ==
| Year | Team | Overall | Conference | Standing | Bowl/playoffs |
|---|---|---|---|---|---|
Drake Bulldogs (Pioneer Football League) (2019–2024)
| 2019 | Drake | 6–5 | 6–2 | T–2nd | |
| 2020–21 | Drake | 2–3 | 2–3 | 6th | |
| 2021 | Drake | 2–9 | 1–7 | T–9th | |
| 2022 | Drake | 3–8 | 3–5 | 8th | |
| 2023 | Drake | 8–4 | 8–0 | 1st | L NCAA Division I First Round |
| 2024 | Drake | 8–3 | 7–1 | 1st | L NCAA Division I First Round |
| Drake: | | 29–32 | 27–18 | | |
Northern Iowa Panthers (Missouri Valley Football Conference) (2025–present)
| 2025 | Northern Iowa | 3–9 | 1–7 | T–8th | |
| Northern Iowa: | | 3–9 | 1–7 | | |
| Total: | | 32–41 | | | |
