= Landon Fox =

American football coach

Current position
- Title: Defensive coordinator & safeties coach
- Team: Western Illinois
- Conference: Big South–OVC

Playing career
- 1995–1999: Defiance

Coaching career (HC unless noted)
- 2000: Preble Shawnee HS (OH) (assistant)
- 2001: Lakeland (GA)
- 2002–2003: Dayton (GA)
- 2004: Ball State (GA)
- 2005–2007: Wayne State (MI) (LB/ST)
- 2008–2009: Dayton (DB)
- 2010–2018: Dayton (DC)
- 2019–2024: Valparaiso
- 2025–present: Western Illinois (DC/S)

Head coaching record
- Overall: 21–42

Landon Fox is an American college football coach. He is the defensive coordinator and safeties coach for the Western Illinois University, positions he has held since 2025. He was the head football coach for Valparaiso University from 2019 to 2024. He also coached for Preble Shawnee High School, Lakeland, Dayton, Ball State, and Wayne State (MI). He played college football for Defiance.

During Fox's 13 combined years at Dayton, he served as a graduate assistant, defensive backs coach, and finally as defensive coordinator from 2010 to 2018.

== Head coaching record ==
Year	Team	Overall	Conference	Standing	Bowl/playoffs
Valparaiso Crusaders/Beacons (Pioneer Football League) (2019–2024)
2019	Valparaiso	1–11	1–7	T–9th	
2020–21	Valparaiso	4–2	4–2	T–2nd	
2021	Valparaiso	4–7	4–4	7th	
2022	Valparaiso	5–7	4–4	T–6th	
2023	Valparaiso	3–8	2–6	T–8th	
2024	Valparaiso	4–7	2–5	9th	
Valparaiso:		21–42	16–26		
Total:		21–42			
