= 2024 St. Thomas Tommies football team =

American college football season

2024 St. Thomas Tommies football
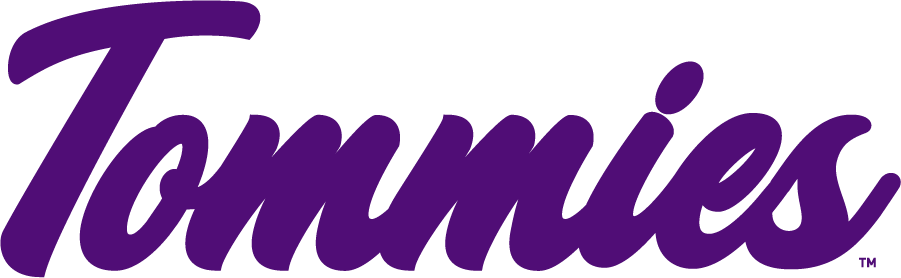
- Conference: Pioneer Football League
- Record: 6–6 (5–3 PFL)
- Head coach: Glenn Caruso (16th season)
- Offensive coordinator: Caleb Corrill (1st season)
- Defensive coordinator: Wallie Kuchinski (16th season)
- Home stadium: O'Shaughnessy Stadium

2024 Pioneer Football League standings
	Conf.			Overall
Team	W		L	W		L
Drake $^	7	–	1	8	–	3
San Diego	6	–	2	8	–	3
Butler	5	–	3	9	–	3
Morehead State	5	–	3	7	–	5
St. Thomas (MN)*	5	–	3	6	–	6
Dayton	4	–	4	6	–	5
Davidson	4	–	4	6	–	5
Presbyterian	4	–	4	6	–	6
Valparaiso	2	–	5	4	–	7
Marist	1	–	7	1	–	10
Stetson	0	–	7	2	–	9
$ – Conference champion; ^ – FCS playoff participant; * – St. Thomas (MN) ineligible for FCS postseason play due to transition from NCAA Division III; Rankings from STATS Poll

The 2024 St. Thomas Tommies football team represented the University of St. Thomas during the 2024 NCAA Division I FCS football season as members of the Pioneer Football League (PFL). They were led by 16th-year head coach Glenn Caruso, and the Tommies played home games at O'Shaughnessy Stadium in Saint Paul, Minnesota.

This season originally marked St. Thomas' fourth year of a five-year transition period from Division III to Division I, an incredibly rare and historic jump that bypasses Division II altogether. On January 15, 2025, the NCAA voted to amend the reclassification timeline for Division I institutions, potentially reducing the Division III to Division I transition period from five years to four. With the timeline amended, St. Thomas would be eligible for NCAA postseason play in the 2025 season as long as the university is able to meet the new standards set (such as academic requirements).

== Schedule ==
Date	Time	Opponent	Site	TV	Result	Attendance
August 29	6:00 pm	Sioux Falls (SD)*	O'Shaughnessy Stadium; St. Paul, MN	Midco Sports+	L 13–34	3,265
September 7	1:00 pm	Northern Iowa*	O'Shaughnessy Stadium; St. Paul, MN	FOX 9+ / Midco Sports+	L 10–17	3,946
September 14	1:00 pm	Black Hills State*	O'Shaughnessy Stadium; St. Paul, MN	Midco Sports+	W 24–14	2,784
September 21	1:00 pm	at Lindenwood*	Harlen C. Hunter Stadium; St. Charles, MO	ESPN+	L 0–64	3,825
October 5	1:00 pm	Stetson	O'Shaughnessy Stadium; St. Paul, MN	FOX 9+ / Midco Sports+	W 34–24	3,495
October 12	11:00 am	at Marist	Tenney Stadium at Leonidoff Field; Poughkeepsie, NY	ESPN+	W 39–32	1,840
October 19	1:00 pm	at Valparaiso	Brown Field; Valparaiso, IN	ESPN+	W 42–14	1,461
October 26	12:00 pm	San Diego	O'Shaugnessy Stadium; St. Paul, MN	Midco Sports+	W 34–14	1,512
November 2	12:00 pm	at Morehead State	Jayne Stadium; Morehead, KY	ESPN+	L 7–21	4,105
November 9	1:00 pm	Drake^{†}	O'Shaughnessy Stadium; St. Paul, MN	Midco Sports+	L 19–22	5,370
November 16	12:00 pm	at Butler	Bud and Jackie Sellick Bowl; Indianapolis, IN	FloFootball	L 20–36	2,926
November 23	1:00 pm	Dayton	O'Shaughnessy Stadium; St. Paul, MN	Midco Sports+	W 32–9	2,171
*Non-conference game; ^{†}Homecoming; All times are in Central time

== Game summaries ==
=== vs. Northern Iowa ===
Game Two – Northern Iowa Panthers (1–0) vs St. Thomas Tommies (0–1) – Game summary

Quarter	1	2	3	4	Total
Panthers	0	7	0	10	17
Tommies	7	0	3	0	10

at O'Shaughnessy Stadium • Saint Paul, MN

- Date: Saturday September 7, 2024
- Game time: 1:00 p.m.
- Game weather: 69 °F (21 °C)
- Game attendance: 3,946
- Referee: Joe Smith
- TV: Midco Sports+

Game information

First quarter

- (6:50) STM – Patrick Wagner 13-yard pass from Michael Rostberg, Stephen Shagen kick (Drive: 9 plays, 80 yards, 4:26; St. Thomas 7–0)

Second quarter

- (13:03) UNI – Amauri Pesek-Hickson 3-yard run, Caden Palmer kick (Drive: 11 plays, 80 yards, 5:11; Tied 7–7)

Third quarter

- (3:53) UST – Stephen Shagen 50-yard field goal (Drive: 12 plays, 47 yards, 7:52; St. Thomas 10–7)

Fourth quarter

- (10:49) UNI – Caden Palmer 19-yard field goal (Drive: 4 plays, 5 yards, 1:21; Tied 10–10)
- (2:57) UNI – Amauri Pesek-Hickson 15-yard run, Caden Palmer kick (Drive: 6 plays, 90 yards, 3:46; Northern Iowa 17–10)

Statistics	UNI	STMN
First downs	16	19
Total yards	331	297
Rushing yards	232	129
Passing yards	99	168
Passing: Comp–Att–Int	11-25-0	19-29-0
Time of possession	25:00	35:00

Team	Category	Player	Statistics
Northern Iowa	Passing	Aidan Dunne	11/25, 99 yards
Northern Iowa	Rushing	Tye Edwards	14 carries, 136 yards
Northern Iowa	Receiving	Sergio Morancy	4 receptions, 52 yards
St. Thomas	Passing	Michael Rostberg	15/23, 104 yards, TD
St. Thomas	Rushing	Hope Adebayo	20 carries, 113 yards
St. Thomas	Receiving	Patrick Wagner	8 receptions, 104 yards, TD

=== at Lindenwood ===
Game Four – St. Thomas Tommies (1–2) vs Lindenwood Lions (0–3) – Game summary

Quarter	1	2	3	4	Total
Tommies	0	0	0	0	0
Lions	7	35	16	6	64

at Harlen C. Hunter Stadium • St. Charles, MO

- Date: September 21, 2024
- Game time: 1:00 p.m.
- Game weather: Cloudy, 87 °F (31 °C)
- Game attendance: 3,825
- Referee: Tremain Williams
- TV announcers (ESPN+): TBD

Game information

First quarter

- (8:30) LIN – Luke Cook 0 yard blocked punt return, Logan Seibert kick (LIN 7–0)

Second quarter

- (14:50) LIN – Cortezz Jones 51 yard run, Logan Seibert kick (Drive: 6 plays, 76 yards, 3:12; LIN 14–0)
- (1:19) LIN – Nate Glantz 16 yard run, Logan Seibert kick (Drive: 6 plays, 62 yards, 2:37; LIN 21–0)
- (8:48) LIN – Cortezz Jones 48 yard run, Logan Seibert kick (Drive: 2 plays, 59 yards, 0:30; LIN 28–0)
- (3:03) LIN – Jeff Caldwell 93 yard pass from Nate Glantz, Logan Seibert kick (Drive: 2 plays, 97 yards, 0:49; LIN 35–0)
- (0:07) LIN – Nate Glantz 2 yard run, Logan Seibert kick (Drive: 11 plays, 73 yards, 1:56; LIN 42–0)

Third quarter

- (10:40) LIN – Logan Seibert 42 yard field goal (Drive: 10 plays, 40 yards, 4:20; LIN 45–0)
- (6:27) LIN – Jeff Caldwell 29 yard pass from Nate Glantz, Logan Seibert kick (Drive: 4 plays, 54 yards, 1:31; LIN 52–0)
- (4:51) LIN – Robert Giaimo 19 yard run (Drive: 1 play, 19 yards, 0:09; LIN 58–0)

Fourth quarter

- (14:20) LIN – Logan Seibert 32 yard field goal (Drive: 8 plays, 17 yards, 4:17; LIN 61–0)
- (4:52) LIN – Logan Seibert 46 yard field goal (Drive: 5 plays, 10 yards, 2:57; LIN 64–0)

Statistics	STMN	LIN
First downs	9	27
Total yards	148	543
Rushing yards	107	279
Passing yards	41	264
Passing: Comp–Att–Int	8–22–2	17–23–0
Time of possession	28:50	31:10

Team	Category	Player	Statistics
St. Thomas	Passing	Michael Rostberg	3/12, 23 yards, 2 INT
St. Thomas	Rushing	Joseph Koch	13 carries, 41 yards
St. Thomas	Receiving	Colin Chase	1 reception, 15 yards
Lindenwood	Passing	Nate Glantz	13/18, 228 yards, 2 TD
Lindenwood	Rushing	Cortezz Jones	10 carries, 152 yards, 2 TD
Lindenwood	Receiving	Jeff Caldwell	5 receptions, 153 yards, 2 TD

=== at Butler ===
Game Eleven – St. Thomas Tommies (5–5) vs Butler Bulldogs (8–2) – Game summary

Quarter	1	2	3	4	Total
Tommies	7	0	7	6	20
Bulldogs	7	6	10	13	36

at Bud and Jackie Sellick Bowl, Indianapolis, IN

- Date: Saturday November 16, 2024
- Game time: 12:00 PM
- Game weather: Cloudy • Temperature: 51 °F (11 °C) • Wind: SE at 6 miles per hour (9.7 km/h)
- Game attendance: 2,926
- Referee: Tim Duffy
- TV: FloFootball

Game information

First quarter

- (4:36) BUT – Luke Wooten 36-yard pass from Reagan Andrew, Ryan Short kick (Drive: 11 plays, 78 yards, 5:11; Butler 7–0)
- (2:59) STMN – Tak Tateoka 1-yard run, Ben Hoiland kick (Drive: 4 plays, 75 yards, 1:37; Tied 7–7)

Second quarter

- (6:13) BUT – Trevon Brown 20-yard pass from Nick Howard (Drive: 5 plays, 33 yards, 2:09; Butler 13–7)

Third quarter

- (12:24) BUT – Nick Howard 2-yard run, Ryan Short kick (Drive: 6 plays, 36 yards, 2:36; Butler 20–7)
- (4:18) STMN – Colin Chase 12-yard pass from Tak Tateoka, Ben Hoiland kick (Drive: 6 plays, 79 yards, 2:55; Butler 20–14)
- (0:01) BUT – Ryan Short 23-yard field goal (Drive: 8 plays, 57 yards, 4:13; Butler 23–14)

Fourth quarter

- (9:14) BUT – Nick Howard 5-yard run (Drive: 1 plays, 5 yards, 0:04; Butler 29–14)
- (8:30) STMN – Colin Chase 25-yard pass from Michael Rostberg (Drive: 2 plays, 33 yards, 0:31; Butler 29–20)
- (3:15) BUT – Nick Howard 28-yard run, Sam Taglia kick (Drive: 9 plays, 75 yards, 5:15; Butler 36–20)

Statistics	STMN	BUT
First downs	16	21
Total yards	367	379
Rushing yards	62	168
Passing yards	305	211
Passing: Comp–Att–Int	18–36–4	16–22–0
Time of possession	23:32	36:28

Team	Category	Player	Statistics
St. Thomas	Passing	Tak Tateoka	13/26, 214 yards, TD, 2 INT
St. Thomas	Rushing	Hope Adebayo	12 carries, 61 yards
St. Thomas	Receiving	Colin Chase	5 receptions, 121 yards, 2 TD
Butler	Passing	Reagan Andrew	14/19, 184 yards, TD
Butler	Rushing	Nick Howard	22 carries, 97 yards, 3 TD
Butler	Receiving	Luke Wooten	5 receptions, 111 yards, TD
