= 2024 Davidson Wildcats football team =

American college football season

2024 Davidson Wildcats football
- Conference: Pioneer Football League
- Record: 6–5 (4–4 PFL)
- Head coach: Scott Abell (7th season)
- Defensive coordinator: Jon Berlin (7th season)
- Home stadium: Davidson College Stadium

2024 Pioneer Football League standings
	Conf.			Overall
Team	W		L	W		L
Drake $^	7	–	1	8	–	3
San Diego	6	–	2	8	–	3
Butler	5	–	3	9	–	3
Morehead State	5	–	3	7	–	5
St. Thomas (MN)*	5	–	3	6	–	6
Dayton	4	–	4	6	–	5
Davidson	4	–	4	6	–	5
Presbyterian	4	–	4	6	–	6
Valparaiso	2	–	5	4	–	7
Marist	1	–	7	1	–	10
Stetson	0	–	7	2	–	9
$ – Conference champion; ^ – FCS playoff participant; * – St. Thomas (MN) ineligible for FCS postseason play due to transition from NCAA Division III; Rankings from STATS Poll

The 2024 Davidson Wildcats football team represented Davidson College as a member of the Pioneer Football League (PFL) during the 2024 NCAA Division I FCS football season. The Wildcats were led by seventh-year head coach Scott Abell and played their home games at Davidson College Stadium in Davidson, North Carolina.

== Schedule ==
Date	Time	Opponent	Site	TV	Result	Attendance
August 31	12:30 pm	at Georgetown*	Cooper Field; Washington, D.C.	ESPN+	L 24–46	3,975
September 7	7:00 pm	Catawba*	Davidson College Stadium; Davidson, NC	ESPN+	W 49–14	4,477
September 14	7:00 pm	Point*	Richardson Stadium; Davidson, NC	ESPN+	W 42–12	2,288
September 29	5:00 pm	at Presbyterian	Bailey Memorial Stadium; Clinton, SC	ESPN+	W 47–38	961
October 5	1:00 pm	Marist	Davidson College Stadium; Davidson, NC	ESPN+	W 42–19	2,124
October 12	12:00 pm	at Dayton	Welcome Stadium; Dayton, OH	Facebook Live	L 14–16	2,757
October 19	1:00 pm	Stetson	Davidson College Stadium; Davidson, NC	ESPN+	W 70–48	2,367
October 26	1:00 pm	Butler	Davidson College Stadium; Davidson, NC	ESPN+	L 38–48	2,979
November 2	4:00 pm	at San Diego	Torero Stadium; San Diego, CA	ESPN+	L 13–40	1,672
November 9	1:00 pm	Morehead State	Davidson College Stadium; Davidson, NC	ESPN+	W 31–14	2,356
November 23	2:00 pm	at Valparaiso	Brown Field; Valparaiso, IN	ESPN+	L 17–18	1,058
*Non-conference game; All times are in Eastern time

== Game summaries ==
=== at Georgetown ===
Game One – Davidson Wildcats (0–0) at Georgetown Hoyas (0–0) – Game summary

Quarter	1	2	3	4	Total
Wildcats	0	0	0	0	0
Hoyas	0	0	0	0	0

at Cooper Field • Washington, DC

- Date: Saturday August 31, 2024
- Game time: 12:30 p.m.
- Game weather: 0 °F (−18 °C)
- TV: ESPN+

Game information

First quarter

- GTWN – Cooper Blomstrom Safety, 13:31. Hoyas 2–0. Drive: 3 plays, -12 yards, 1:29.
- GTWN – Patrick Ryan 33 Yd Field Goal, 10:06. Hoyas 5–0. Drive: 7 plays, 32 yards, 3:25.
- DAV – Adam Zouagui 48 Yd Field Goal, 6:32. Hoyas 5–3. Drive: 6 plays, 31 yards, 3:27.
- GTWN – Naieem Kearney 23 Yd Run (Patrick Ryan Kick), 0:26. Hoyas 12–3. Drive: 5 plays, 66 yards, 2:43.

Second quarter

- DAV – Mason Sheron 3 Yd Run (Adam Zouagui Kick), 12:37. Hoyas 12–10. Drive: 5 plays, 45 yards, 2:39.
- GTWN – Bryce Cox 59 Yd Run (Patrick Ryan Kick), 11:23. Hoyas 19–10. Drive: 3 plays, 75 yards, 1:14.
- DAV – Mari Adams 11 Yd Run (Adam Zouagui Kick), 8:02. Hoyas 19–17. Drive: 7 plays, 76 yards, 3:15.
- GTWN – Patrick Ryan 27 Yd Field Goal, 3:41. Hoyas 22–17. Drive: 10 plays, 65 yards, 4:21.

Third quarter

- GTWN – Naieem Kearney 20 Yd Run (Patrick Ryan Kick), 14:42. Hoyas 29–17. Drive: 1 play, 20 yards, 0:05.
- GTWN – Quincy Briggs 64 Yd Fumble Return (Patrick Ryan Kick), 9:13. Hoyas 36–17. Drive: 9 plays, 39 yards, 5:25.
- GTWN – Bryce Cox 23 Yd Run (Patrick Ryan Kick), 0:23. Hoyas 43–17. Drive: 4 plays, 68 yards, 2:04.

Fourth quarter

- GTWN – Patrick Ryan 25 Yd Field Goal, 8:38. Hoyas 46–17. Drive: 8 plays, 46 yards, 3:49.
- DAV – Andrew Frazier 7 Yd Run (Adam Zouagui Kick), 1:55. Hoyas 46–17. Drive: 13 plays, 58 yards, 6:30.

Statistics	DAV	GTWN
First downs	22	20
Total yards	345	369
Rushing yards	224	263
Passing yards	121	106
Passing: Comp–Att–Int	11–18–1	9–17–0
Time of possession	38:56	21:04

Team	Category	Player	Statistics
Davidson	Passing	Coulter Cleland	8/11, 98 yards, 1 INT
Davidson	Rushing	Mari Adams	13 carries, 48 yards, 1 TD
Davidson	Receiving	Kellyn West	1 receptions, 42 yards
Georgetown	Passing	Danny Lauter	9/16, 106 yards
Georgetown	Rushing	Naieem Kearney	5 carries, 87 yards, 2 TD
Georgetown	Receiving	Jimmy Kibble	4 receptions, 60 yards

=== Catawba (DII) ===
Game Two – Catawba Indians (DII) (0–0) at Davidson Wildcats (0–1) – Game summary

Quarter	1	2	3	4	Total
Indians (DII)	0	0	0	0	0
Wildcats	0	0	0	0	0

at Davidson College Stadium • Davidson, North Carolina

- Date: Saturday September 7, 2024
- Game time: 7:00 p.m. EST
- TV: ESPN+

Game information

First quarter
Second quarter
Third quarter
Fourth quarter

Statistics	CAT	DAV
First downs		
Total yards		
Rushing yards		
Passing yards		
Passing: Comp–Att–Int		
Time of possession		

Team	Category	Player	Statistics
Catawba	Passing		
Catawba	Rushing		
Catawba	Receiving		
Davidson	Passing		
Davidson	Rushing		
Davidson	Receiving		

=== Point (NAIA) ===
Game Three – Point Skyhawks (NAIA) (0–2) at Davidson Wildcats (1–1) – Game summary

Quarter	1	2	3	4	Total
Skyhawks (NAIA)	0	0	0	0	0
Wildcats	0	0	0	0	0

at Davidson College Stadium • Davidson, North Carolina

- Date: Saturday September 14, 2024
- Game time: 7:00 p.m. EST
- TV: ESPN+

Game information

First quarter
Second quarter
Third quarter
Fourth quarter

Statistics	POINT	DAV
First downs		
Total yards		
Rushing yards		
Passing yards		
Passing: Comp–Att–Int		
Time of possession		

Team	Category	Player	Statistics
Point	Passing		
Point	Rushing		
Point	Receiving		
Davidson	Passing		
Davidson	Rushing		
Davidson	Receiving		

=== at Presbyterian ===
Game Four – Davidson Wildcats (2–1) at Presbyterian Blue Hose (2–1) – Game summary

Quarter	1	2	3	4	Total
Wildcats	0	0	0	0	0
Blue Hose	0	0	0	0	0

at Bailey Memorial Stadium • Clinton, SC

- Date: Sunday September 29, 2024
- Game time: 5:00 p.m.
- TV: ESPN+

Game information

First quarter

Second quarter

Third quarter

Fourth quarter

Statistics	DAV	PRES
First downs		
Total yards		
Rushing yards		
Passing yards		
Passing: Comp–Att–Int		
Time of possession		

Team	Category	Player	Statistics
Davidson	Passing		
Davidson	Rushing		
Davidson	Receiving		
Presbyterian	Passing		
Presbyterian	Rushing		
Presbyterian	Receiving		

=== Marist ===
Game Five – Marist Red Foxes (0–4) at Davidson Wildcats (3–1) – Game summary

Quarter	1	2	3	4	Total
Red Foxes	0	0	0	0	0
Wildcats	0	0	0	0	0

at Davidson College Stadium • Davidson, North Carolina

- Date: Saturday October 5, 2024
- Game time: 1:00 PM
- Game weather: 0 °F (−18 °C)
- TV: ESPN+

Game information

First quarter
Second quarter
Third quarter
Fourth quarter

Statistics	MRST	DAV
First downs		
Total yards		
Rushing yards		
Passing yards		
Passing: Comp–Att–Int		
Time of possession		

Team	Category	Player	Statistics
Marist	Passing		
Marist	Rushing		
Marist	Receiving		
Davidson	Passing		
Davidson	Rushing		
Davidson	Receiving		

=== at Dayton ===
Game Six – Davidson Wildcats (4–1) at Dayton Flyers (3–1) – Game summary

Quarter	1	2	3	4	Total
Wildcats	0	0	0	0	0
Flyers	0	0	0	0	0

at Welcome Stadium, Dayton, Ohio

- Date: Saturday October 12, 2024
- Game time: 12:00 PM
- TV announcers (Facebook Live): TBD

Game information

First quarter
Second quarter
Third quarter
Fourth quarter

Statistics	DAV	DAY
First downs		
Total yards		
Rushing yards		
Passing yards		
Passing: Comp–Att–Int		
Time of possession		

Team	Category	Player	Statistics
Davidson	Passing		
Davidson	Rushing		
Davidson	Receiving		
Dayton	Passing		
Dayton	Rushing		
Dayton	Receiving		

=== Stetson ===
Game Seven – Stetson Hatters (2–3) at Davidson Wildcats (4–2) – Game summary

Quarter	1	2	3	4	Total
Hatters	0	0	0	0	0
Wildcats	0	0	0	0	0

at Davidson College Stadium • Davidson, North Carolina

- Date: Saturday October 19, 2024
- Game time: 1:00 p.m. EST
- TV: ESPN+

Game information

First quarter
Second quarter
Third quarter
Fourth quarter

Statistics	STET	DAV
First downs		
Total yards		
Rushing yards		
Passing yards		
Passing: Comp–Att–Int		
Time of possession		

Team	Category	Player	Statistics
Stetson	Passing		
Stetson	Rushing		
Stetson	Receiving		
Davidson	Passing		
Davidson	Rushing		
Davidson	Receiving		

=== Butler ===
Game Eight – Butler Bulldogs (5–2) at Davidson Wildcats (5–2) – Game summary

Quarter	1	2	3	4	Total
Bulldogs	14	14	10	10	48
Wildcats	7	10	7	14	38

at Davidson College Stadium • Davidson, North Carolina

- Date: Saturday October 26, 2024
- Game time: 1:00 p.m. EST
- Game weather: Sunny • Temperature: 78 °F (26 °C) • Wind: N at 3 miles per hour (4.8 km/h)
- Game attendance: 2,979
- Referee: Bilah Abdullah
- TV: ESPN+

Game information

First quarter

- (12:58) BUT – Billy Dozier 63-yard run, Ryan Short kick (Drive: 1 plays, 63 yards, 0:11; Butler 7–0)
- (8:37) BUT – Devaon Holman 20-yard interception return, Ryan Short kick (Butler 14–0)
- (1:02) DAV – Mari Adams 4-yard run, Adam Zouagui kick (Drive: 11 plays, 77 yards, 5:54; Butler 14–7)

Second quarter

- (13:45) BUT – Reagan Andrew 5-yard run, Ryan Short kick (Drive: 6 plays, 75 yards, 2:17; Butler 21–7)
- (4:29) DAV – Adam Zouagui 26-yard field goal (Drive: 16 plays, 81 yards, 9:08; Butler 21–10)
- (2:28) DAV – Mari Adams 5-yard run, Adam Zouagui kick (Drive: 2 plays, 10 yards, 0:30; Butler 21–17)
- (0:27) BUT – Griffin Caldwell 13-yard run, Ryan Short kick (Drive: 6 plays, 75 yards, 2:01; Butler 28–17)

Third quarter

- (12:17) BUT – Ryan Short 26-yard field goal (Drive: 7 plays, 66 yards, 2:43; Butler 31–17)
- (4:49) BUT – Nick Howard 4-yard run, Ryan Short kick (Drive: 7 plays, 90 yards, 4:49; Butler 38–17)
- (1:18) DAV – Jaleel Sales 15-yard pass from Luke Durkin, Adam Zouagui kick (Drive: 9 plays, 75 yards, 3:31; Butler 38–24)

Fourth quarter

- (12:58) BUT – Ryan Short 31-yard field goal (Drive: 8 plays, 29 yards, 3:12; Butler 41–24)
- (6:01) DAV – Brody Reina 33-yard pass from Luke Durkin, Adam Zouagui kick (Drive: 3 plays, 52 yards, 0:54; Butler 41–31)
- (2:09) BUT – Reagan Andrew 41-yard run, Ryan Short kick (Drive: 6 plays, 75 yards, 3:52; Butler 48–31)
- (1:00) DAV – Ivan Hoyt 28-yard pass from Andrew Frazier, Adam Zouagui kick (Drive: 6 plays, 75 yards, 1:09; Butler 48–38)

Statistics	BUT	DAV
First downs	18	28
Total yards	460	440
Rushing yards	283	187
Passing yards	177	253
Passing: Comp–Att–Int	8–18–1	15–24–2
Time of possession	25:49	34:11

Team	Category	Player	Statistics
Butler	Passing	Reagan Andrew	6/15, 112 yards, INT
Butler	Rushing	Reagan Andrew	13 carries, 98 yards, 2 TD
Butler	Receiving	Luke Wooten	4 receptions, 100 yards
Davidson	Passing	Luke Durkin	9/14, 155 yards, 2 TD
Davidson	Rushing	Mari Adams	18 carries, 103 yards, 2 TD
Davidson	Receiving	Brody Reina	5 receptions, 118 yards, TD

=== at San Diego ===
Game Nine – Davidson Wildcats (5–3) at San Diego Toreros (4–3) – Game summary

Quarter	1	2	3	4	Total
Wildcats	0	0	0	0	0
Toreros	0	0	0	0	0

at Torero Stadium, San Diego, CA

- Date: Saturday November 2, 2024
- Game time: 4:00 p.m. EST
- TV announcers (ESPN+): TBD

Game information

First quarter
Second quarter
Third quarter
Fourth quarter

Statistics	DAV	USD
First downs		
Total yards		
Rushing yards		
Passing yards		
Passing: Comp–Att–Int		
Time of possession		

Team	Category	Player	Statistics
Davidson	Passing		
Davidson	Rushing		
Davidson	Receiving		
San Diego	Passing		
San Diego	Rushing		
San Diego	Receiving		

=== Morehead State ===
Game Ten – Morehead State Eagles (6–3) at Davidson Wildcats (5–4) – Game summary

Quarter	1	2	3	4	Total
Eagles	0	0	0	0	0
Wildcats	0	0	0	0	0

at Davidson College Stadium • Davidson, North Carolina

- Date: Saturday November 9, 2024
- Game time: 1:00 p.m. EST
- TV: ESPN+

Game information

First quarter
Second quarter
Third quarter
Fourth quarter

Statistics	MORE	DAV
First downs		
Total yards		
Rushing yards		
Passing yards		
Passing: Comp–Att–Int		
Time of possession		

Team	Category	Player	Statistics
Morehead State	Passing		
Morehead State	Rushing		
Morehead State	Receiving		
Davidson	Passing		
Davidson	Rushing		
Davidson	Receiving		

=== at Valparaiso ===
Game Eleven – Davidson Wildcats (6–4) at Valparaiso Beacons (3–7) – Game summary

Quarter	1	2	3	4	Total
Wildcats	0	0	0	0	0
Beacons	0	0	0	0	0

at Brown Field, Valparaiso, IN

- Date: Saturday November 23, 2024
- Game time: 2:00 p.m. EST
- TV announcers (ESPN+): TBD

Game information

First quarter
Second quarter
Third quarter
Fourth quarter

Statistics	DAV	VAL
First downs		
Total yards		
Rushing yards		
Passing yards		
Passing: Comp–Att–Int		
Time of possession		

Team	Category	Player	Statistics
Davidson	Passing		
Davidson	Rushing		
Davidson	Receiving		
Valparaiso	Passing		
Valparaiso	Rushing		
Valparaiso	Receiving		
