= 2024 Drake Bulldogs football team =

American college football season

2024 Drake Bulldogs football

PFL champion

NCAA Division I First Round, L 29–43 at Tarleton State
- Conference: Pioneer Football League
- Record: 8–3 (7–1 PFL)
- Head coach: Todd Stepsis (6th season)
- Co-offensive coordinators: Adam Gajo (4th season); Nate Thompson (3rd season)
- Defensive coordinator: Allen Smith (6th season)
- Home stadium: Drake Stadium

2024 Pioneer Football League standings
| | Conf. | | | Overall |
| Team | W | | L | W | | L |
|---|---|---|---|---|---|---|
| Drake $^ | 7 | – | 1 | 8 | – | 3 |
| San Diego | 6 | – | 2 | 8 | – | 3 |
| Butler | 5 | – | 3 | 9 | – | 3 |
| Morehead State | 5 | – | 3 | 7 | – | 5 |
| St. Thomas (MN)* | 5 | – | 3 | 6 | – | 6 |
| Dayton | 4 | – | 4 | 6 | – | 5 |
| Davidson | 4 | – | 4 | 6 | – | 5 |
| Presbyterian | 4 | – | 4 | 6 | – | 6 |
| Valparaiso | 2 | – | 5 | 4 | – | 7 |
| Marist | 1 | – | 7 | 1 | – | 10 |
| Stetson | 0 | – | 7 | 2 | – | 9 |
$ – Conference champion; ^ – FCS playoff participant; * – St. Thomas (MN) ineligible for FCS postseason play due to transition from NCAA Division III; Rankings from STATS Poll

The 2024 Drake Bulldogs football team represented Drake University as a member of the Pioneer Football League (PFL) during the 2024 NCAA Division I FCS football season. The Bulldogs were led by sixth-year head coach Todd Stepsis and played their home games at Drake Stadium in Des Moines, Iowa.

== Schedule ==
| Date | Time | Opponent | Site | TV | Result | Attendance | Source |
|---|---|---|---|---|---|---|---|
| August 29 | 6:30 pm | Quincy (IL)* | Drake Stadium; Des Moines, IA | ESPN+ | No contest | | |
| September 7 | 6:00 p.m. | at Eastern Washington* | Roos Field; Cheney, WA | ESPN+ | W 35–32 ^{OT} | 4,378 | |
| September 21 | 1:00 pm | at No. 6 South Dakota* | DakotaDome; Vermillion, SD | ESPN+ | L 3–42 | 6,529 | |
| September 28 | 12:00 pm | San Diego^{†} | Drake Stadium; Des Moines, IA | ESPN+ | W 30–28 | 4,568 | |
| October 5 | 12:00 pm | at Valparaiso | Brown Field; Valparaiso, IN | ESPN+ | W 27–3 | 2,577 | |
| October 12 | 1:00 p.m. | Butler | Drake Stadium; Des Moines, IA | ESPN+ | W 27–17 | 2,571 | |
| October 19 | 12:00 pm | at Presbyterian | Bailey Memorial Stadium; Clinton, SC | ESPN+ | W 19–16 ^{OT} | 2,515 | |
| November 2 | 1:00 p.m. | Marist | Drake Stadium; Des Moines, IA | ESPN+ | W 19–0 | 2,636 | |
| November 9 | 1:00 pm | at St. Thomas (MN) | O'Shaughnessy Stadium; Saint Paul, MN | ESPN+ | W 22–19 | 5,370 | |
| November 16 | 1:00 p.m. | Morehead State | Drake Stadium; Des Moines, IA | ESPN+ | L 20–29 | 2,976 | |
| November 23 | 12:00 pm | at Stetson | Spec Martin Stadium; DeLand, FL | ESPN+ | W 49–10 | 1,244 | |
| November 30 | 2:00 pm | at No. 14 Tarleton State* | Memorial Stadium; Stephenville, TX (NCAA Division I First Round) | ESPN+ | L 29–43 | 3,583 | |
*Non-conference game; ^{†}Homecoming; Rankings from STATS Poll released prior to the game; All times are in Central time

== Game summaries ==
=== at Eastern Washington ===
Game One – Drake Bulldogs (0–0) at Eastern Washington Eagles (1–0) – Game summary

| Quarter | 1 | 2 | 3 | 4 | OT | Total |
|---|---|---|---|---|---|---|
| Bulldogs | 0 | 13 | 7 | 9 | 6 | 35 |
| Eagles | 7 | 7 | 7 | 8 | 3 | 32 |

at Roos Field • Cheney, WA

- Date: Saturday September 7, 2024
- Game time: 6:00 PM CST
- Game weather: Sunny • Temperature: 94 °F (34 °C) • Wind: N at 5 miles per hour (8.0 km/h)
- Game attendance: 4,378
- Referee: Jim Crowley
- TV announcers (ESPN+): Austin Getz (play-by-play) and Adam Shackleford (analyst)

Game information

First quarter

- 9:13 EWU – Tuna Altahir 1-yard run (Soren McKee kick) (Drive: 13 plays, 75 yards, 5:47; EWU 7–0)

Second quarter

- 12:33 Drake – Luke Woodson 1-yard run (Shane Dunning kick) (Drive: 8 plays, 86 yards, 4:06; Tied 7–7)
- 4:06 Drake – Shane Dunning 47-yard field goal (Drive: 6 plays, 23 yards, 2:29; Drake 10–7)
- 1:42 EWU – Efton Chism III 1-yard pass from Michael Wortham (Soren McKee kick) (Drive: 7 plays, 75 yards, 2:24; EWU 14–10)
- 0:00 Drake – Shane Dunning 44-yard field goal (Drive: 11 plays, 48 yards, 1:42; EWU 14–13)

Third quarter

- 13:11 Drake – Parker Olthoff 3-yard pass from Luke Bailey (Shane Dunning kick) (Drive: 3 plays, 76 yards, 1:45; Drake 20–14)
- 7:42 EWU – Michael Wortham 2-yard run (Soren McKee kick) (Drive: 11 plays, 83 yards, 5:25; EWU 21–20)

Fourth quarter

- 12:19 Drake – Darian Boyland 1-yard run (Luke Bailey pass failed) (Drive: 12 plays, 81 yards, 2:42; Drake 26–21)
- 7:42 EWU – Michael Wortham 6-yard run (Keikoa Visperis run) (Drive: 10 plays, 63 yards, 4:23; EWU 29–26)
- 4:29 Drake – Shane Dunning 41-yard field goal (Drive: 7 plays, 51 yards, 3:13; Tied 29–29)

Overtime

- EWU – Soren McKee 36-yard field goal (Drive: 4 plays, 6 yards; EWU 32–29)
- Drake – Trey Radocha 14-yard pass from Luke Bailey(Drive: 4 plays, 25 yards; Drake 35–32)

| Statistics | DRKE | EWU |
|---|---|---|
| First downs | 25 | 23 |
| Total yards | 460 | 385 |
| Rushing yards | 67 | 206 |
| Passing yards | 393 | 179 |
| Passing: Comp–Att–Int | 29–49–0 | 23–30–0 |
| Time of possession | 24:23 | 35:37 |

| Team | Category | Player | Statistics |
|---|---|---|---|
| Drake | Passing | Luke Bailey | 28/48, 380 yards, 2 TD |
| Drake | Rushing | Dorian Boyland | 8 carries, 25 yards, TD |
| Drake | Receiving | Mitchell January | 5 receptions, 101 yards |
| Eastern Washington | Passing | Kekoa Visperas | 21/26, 177 yards |
| Eastern Washington | Rushing | Tuna Altahir | 12 carries, 94 yards, TD |
| Eastern Washington | Receiving | Efton Chism III | 9 receptions, 65 yards, TD |

=== at No. 6 South Dakota ===
Game Two – Drake Bulldogs (1–0) at No. 6 South Dakota Coyotes (1–1) – Game summary

| Quarter | 1 | 2 | 3 | 4 | Total |
|---|---|---|---|---|---|
| Bulldogs | 0 | 3 | 0 | 0 | 3 |
| No. 6 Coyotes | 14 | 14 | 7 | 7 | 42 |

at DakotaDome • Vermillion, SD

- Date: Saturday September 21, 2024
- Game time: 1:00 PM CST
- Game weather: Indoor
- Game attendance: 6,529
- Referee: Jason Perkins
- TV announcers (ESPN+): Jay Elsen (play-by-play) and Andre Fields (analyst)

Game information

First quarter

- 14:47 USD – Keyondray Jones-Logan 99-yard kickoff return (Will Leyland kick) (USD 7–0)
- 3:51 USD – Travis Theis 25-yard run (Will Leyland kick) (Drive: 5 plays, 58 yards, 2:39; USD 14–0)

Second quarter

- 12:17 Drake – Shane Dunning 23-yard field goal (Drive: 6 plays, 62 yards, 1:05; USD 14–3)
- 8:44 USD – Carter Bell 6-yard run (Will Leyland kick) (Drive: 7 plays, 71 yards, 3:33; USD 21–3)
- 3:14 USD – Charles Pierre, Jr. 1-yard run (Will Leyland kick) (Drive: 7 plays, 46 yards, 3:53; USD 28–3)

Third quarter

- 3:14 USD – Travis Theis Jr. 4-yard run (Will Leyland kick) (Drive: 6 plays, 52 yards, 3:01; USD 35–3)

Fourth quarter

- 3:14 USD – Charles Pierre, Jr. 20-yard pass from Aidan Bouman (Will Leyland kick) (Drive: 9 plays, 80 yards, 5:01; USD 42–3)

| Statistics | DRKE | SDAK |
|---|---|---|
| First downs | 18 | 25 |
| Total yards | 211 | 411 |
| Rushing yards | 93 | 192 |
| Passing yards | 118 | 219 |
| Passing: Comp–Att–Int | 18–33–1 | 18–26–1 |
| Time of possession | 32:17 | 27:43 |

| Team | Category | Player | Statistics |
|---|---|---|---|
| Drake | Passing | Luke Bailey | 16/29, 107 yards, INT |
| Drake | Rushing | Dorian Boyland | 8 carries, 51 yards |
| Drake | Receiving | Trey Radocha | 7 receptions, 56 yards |
| South Dakota | Passing | Aidan Bouman | 18/24, 219 yards, TD |
| South Dakota | Rushing | Travis Theis | 9 carries, 94 yards, 2 TD |
| South Dakota | Receiving | Carter Bell | 4 receptions, 56 yards |

=== San Diego ===
Game Three – San Diego Toreros (2–1) at Drake Bulldogs (1–1) – Game summary

| Quarter | 1 | 2 | 3 | 4 | Total |
|---|---|---|---|---|---|
| Toreros | 6 | 3 | 0 | 19 | 28 |
| Bulldogs | 3 | 10 | 7 | 10 | 30 |

at Drake Stadium • Des Moines, Iowa

- Date: Saturday, September 28, 2024
- Game time: 12:00 PM CST
- Game weather: 78 °F (26 °C)
- Game attendance: 4,568
- Referee: Jason Berg
- TV announcers (ESPN+): Chuck Reed (play-by-play) and Craig Wederquist (analyst)

Game information

First quarter

- 10:31 USD – Josh Heverly 17-yard pass from Grant Sergent (Aidan Lehman kick blocked) (Drive: 7 plays, 76 yards, 4:24; USD 6–0)
- 7:03 Drake – Shane Dunning 23-yard field goal (Drive: 7 plays, 46 yards, 3:16; USD 6–3)

Second quarter

- 12:17 USD – Aidan Lehman 30-yard field goal (Drive: 13 plays, 82 yards, 5:28; USD 9–3)
- 6:58 Drake – Shane Dunning 42-yard field goal (Drive: 3 plays, 16 yards, 0:39; USD 9–6)
- 0:52 Drake – Trey Radocha 3-yard pass from Luke Bailey (Shane Dunning kick) (Drive: 9 plays, 51 yards, 4:50; Drake 13–9)

Third quarter

- 2:24 Drake – Blake Ellingson 41-yard run (Shane Dunnings kick) (Drive: 5 plays, 60 yards, 2:45; Drake 20–9)

Fourth quarter

- 12:53 Drake – Mitchell January 36-yard pass from Luke Bailey (Shane Dunning kick) (Drive: 1 play, 36 yards, 0:09; Drake 27–9)
- 11:30 USD – Logan Ginng 2-yard run (Grant Sergent pass) (Drive: 5 plays, 54 yards, 1:23; Drake 27–17)
- 6:34 USD – Aidan Lehman 26-yard field goal (Drive: 7 plays, 71 yards, 2:38; Drake 27–20)
- 6:24 USD – Safety, Drake penalty in end zone (Drake 27–22)
- 1:55 USD – Peyton Smith 5-yard pass from Grant Sergent (Grant Sergent pass failed) (Drive: 7 plays, 71 yards, 2:38; USD 28–27)
- 0:00 Drake – Shane Dunning 48-yard field goal (Drive: 8 plays, 62 yards, 0:44; Drake 30–28)

| Statistics | USD | DRKE |
|---|---|---|
| First downs | 23 | 16 |
| Total yards | 390 | 354 |
| Rushing yards | 98 | 91 |
| Passing yards | 292 | 263 |
| Passing: Comp–Att–Int | 25–40–1 | 29–49–0 |
| Time of possession | 33:45 | 26:15 |

| Team | Category | Player | Statistics |
|---|---|---|---|
| San Diego | Passing | Grant Sergent | 25/40, 292 yards, 2 TD, INT |
| San Diego | Rushing | Isaiah Smith | 6 carries, 33 yards |
| San Diego | Receiving | Cole Monach | 8 receptions, 122 yards |
| Drake | Passing | Luke Bailey | 29/49, 263 yards, 2 TD |
| Drake | Rushing | Blake Ellingson | 4 carries, 69 yards, TD |
| Drake | Receiving | Mitchell January | 9 receptions, 121 yards, TD |

=== at Valparaiso ===
Game Four – Drake Bulldogs (2–1) at Valparaiso Beacons (3–2) – Game summary

| Quarter | 1 | 2 | 3 | 4 | Total |
|---|---|---|---|---|---|
| Bulldogs | 10 | 3 | 0 | 14 | 27 |
| Beacons | 0 | 0 | 3 | 0 | 3 |

at Brown Field • Valparaiso, Indiana

- Date: Saturday, October 5, 2024
- Game time: 12:00 PM CST
- Game weather: 74 °F (23 °C)
- Game attendance: 2,577
- Referee: John Shay
- TV announcers (ESPN+): Chuck Reed (play-by-play) and Craig Wederquist (analyst)

Game information

First quarter

- 10:31 Drake – Joe Frommelt recovered fumble in end zone (Shane Dunning kick) (Drake 7–0)
- 6:11 Drake – Mitchell January 5-yard pass from Blake Ellingson (Shane Dunning kick) (Drive: 6 plays, 69 yards, 3:09;Drake 14–0)

Second quarter

- 14:03 Drake – Shane Dunning 38-yard field goal (Drive: 8 plays, 40 yards, 3:24; Drake 17–0)

Third quarter

- 2:24 Valpo – Ryan Hawk 22-yard field goal (Drive: 9 plays, 33 yards, 3:48; Drake 17–3)

Fourth quarter

- 11:22 Drake – Shane Dunning 45-yard field goal (Drive: 10 plays, 47 yards, 5:28; Drake 20–3)
- 6:02 Drake – Dairon Cherwin 21-yard run (Shane Dunning kick) (Drive: 8 plays, 77 yards, 4:23; Drake 27–3)

| Statistics | DRKE | VAL |
|---|---|---|
| First downs | 17 | 10 |
| Total yards | 390 | 80 |
| Rushing yards | 128 | –4 |
| Passing yards | 228 | 84 |
| Passing: Comp–Att–Int | 19–29–1 | 11–22–1 |
| Time of possession | 31:42 | 28:18 |

| Team | Category | Player | Statistics |
|---|---|---|---|
| Drake | Passing | Luke Bailey | 17/26, 224 yards, INT |
| Drake | Rushing | Davion Cherwin | 10 carries, 72 yards, TD |
| Drake | Receiving | Sam Rodriguez | 3 receptions, 65 yards |
| Valparaiso | Passing | Caron Tyler | 11/21, 84 yards, INT |
| Valparaiso | Rushing | Ryan Mann | 12 carries, 25 yards |
| Valparaiso | Receiving | Gary Givens III | 2 receptions, 23 yards |

=== Butler ===
Game Five – Butler Bulldogs (5–0) at Drake Bulldogs (3–1) – Game summary

| Quarter | 1 | 2 | 3 | 4 | Total |
|---|---|---|---|---|---|
| Butler | 0 | 6 | 3 | 8 | 17 |
| Drake | 0 | 3 | 10 | 14 | 27 |

at Drake Stadium • Des Moines, Iowa

- Date: Saturday October 12, 2024
- Game time: 1:00 p.m. CST
- Game weather: Sunny • Temperature: 75 °F (24 °C) • Wind: N at 8 miles per hour (13 km/h)
- Game attendance: 2,571
- Referee: Jason Perkins
- TV announcers (ESPN+): Michael Admire (play-by-play)

Game information

First quarter

No scoring plays

Second quarter

- (12:08) DU – Shane Dunning 34-yard field goal (Drive: 14 plays, 46 yards, 5:57; Drake 3–0)
- (0:47) BUT – Reagan Andrew 4-yard run (Drive: 14 plays, 89 yards, 5:22; Butler 6–3)

Third quarter

- (8:55) DU – Shane Dunning 44-yard field goal (Drive: 11 plays, 48 yards, 6:05; Tied 6–6)
- (4:13) DU – Taj Hughes 38-yard pass from Luke Bailey, Shane Dunning kick (Drive: 6 plays, 73 yards, 3:36; Drake 13–6)
- (0:03) BUT – Ryan Short 39-yard field goal (Drive: 9 plays, 60 yards, 4:02; Drake 13–9)

Fourth quarter

- (9:48) DU – Blake Ellingson 1-yard run, Shane Dunning kick (Drive: 10 plays, 75 yards, 5:15; Drake 20–9)
- (8:44) DU – Davion Cherwin 32-yard run, Shane Dunning kick (Drive: 2 plays, 32 yards, 0:16; Drake 27–9)
- (4:54) BUT – Joey Suchy 2-yard run, Ethan Loss pass (Drive: 11 plays, 75 yards, 3:50; Drake 27–17)

| Statistics | BUT | DRKE |
|---|---|---|
| First downs | 28 | 19 |
| Total yards | 333 | 314 |
| Rushing yards | 119 | 99 |
| Passing yards | 214 | 215 |
| Passing: Comp–Att–Int | 25–38–2 | 18–28–1 |
| Time of possession | 29:21 | 30:39 |

| Team | Category | Player | Statistics |
|---|---|---|---|
| Butler | Passing | Andrew Reagan | 22/32, 174 yards, 2 INT |
| Butler | Rushing | Andrew Reagan | 18 carries, 81 yards, TD |
| Butler | Receiving | Ethan Loss | 8 receptions, 86 yards |
| Drake | Passing | Luke Bailey | 16/25, 213 yards, TD, INT |
| Drake | Rushing | Davion Cherwin | 7 carries, 55 yards, TD |
| Drake | Receiving | Taj Hughes | 7 receptions, 127 yards, TD |

=== at Presbyterian ===
Game Six – Drake Bulldogs (4–1) at Presbyterian Blue Hose (2–5) – Game summary

| Quarter | 1 | 2 | 3 | 4 | OT | Total |
|---|---|---|---|---|---|---|
| Bulldogs | 0 | 10 | 0 | 3 | 6 | 19 |
| Blue Hose | 6 | 7 | 0 | 0 | 3 | 16 |

at Bailey Memorial Stadium • Clinton, South Carolina

- Date: Saturday October 19, 2024
- Game time: 12:00 p.m. CST
- Game weather: Sunny, 67 °F (19 °C) • Wind: NE at 6 miles per hour (9.7 km/h)
- Game attendance: 2,515
- Referee: Brian Hilpisch
- TV: ESPN+

Game information

First quarter

- (0:48) PC – Justin Montgomery 2-yard run (kick failed) (Drive: 4 plays, 91 yards, 1:34; PC 6–0)

Second quarter

- (11:33) Drake – Taj Hughes 25-yard run (Shane Dunning kick) (Drive: 7 plays, 68 yards, 4:09; Drake 7–6)
- (5:02) PC – Nigel Brown 1 yard pass from Collin Hurst (Peter Lipscombe kick) (Drive: 5 plays, 50 yards, 1:44; PC 13–7)
- (11:33) Drake – Shane Dunning 36-yard field goal (Drive: 11 plays, 56 yards, 4:54; PC 13–10)

Third quarter

No scoring plays

Fourth quarter

- (4:17) Drake – Shane Dunning 37-yard field goal (Drive: 10 plays, 71 yards, 4:48; Tied 13–13)

Overtime

- PC – Jett Jackson 42-yard field goal (Drive: 4 plays, 0 yards; PC 16–13)
- Drake – Davion Cherwin 11-yard run (Drive: 3 plays, 25 yards; Drake 19–16)

| Statistics | DRKE | PRES |
|---|---|---|
| First downs | 22 | 17 |
| Total yards | 435 | 346 |
| Rushing yards | 60 | 145 |
| Passing yards | 375 | 201 |
| Passing: Comp–Att–Int | 30–42–2 | 26–35–0 |
| Time of possession | 29:56 | 30:04 |

| Team | Category | Player | Statistics |
|---|---|---|---|
| Drake | Passing | Luke Bailey | 30/41, 375 yards, INT |
| Drake | Rushing | Taj Hughes | 3 carries, 34 yards, TD |
| Drake | Receiving | Trey Radocha | 9 receptions, 125 yards |
| Presbyterian | Passing | Collin Hurst | 26/35, 201 yards, TD |
| Presbyterian | Rushing | Zach Switzer | 7 carries, 87 yards |
| Presbyterian | Receiving | Cincere Gil | 8 receptions, 75 yards |

=== Marist ===
Game Seven – Marist Red Foxes (0–8) at Drake Bulldogs (5–1) – Game summary

| Quarter | 1 | 2 | 3 | 4 | Total |
|---|---|---|---|---|---|
| Red Foxes | 0 | 0 | 0 | 0 | 0 |
| Bulldogs | 3 | 10 | 6 | 0 | 19 |

at Drake Stadium, Des Moines, Iowa

- Date: Saturday November 2, 2024
- Game time: 1:00 p.m.
- Game attendance: 2,636
- Referee: Gregory Gompf
- TV announcers (ESPN+): Michael Admire & Jeff Woody

Game information

First quarter

- (9:26) Drake – Shane Dunning 29-yard field goal (Drive: 6 plays, 13 yards, 2:29; Drake 3–0)

Second quarter

- (1:21) Drake – Parker Olthoff 1-yard pass from Luke Bailey (Shane Dunning kick) (Drive: 10 plays, 76 yards, 5:15; Drake 10–0)
- (0:21) Drake – Shane Dunning 31-yard field goal (Drive: 5 plays, 58 yards, 0:37; Drake 13–0)

Third quarter

- (1:21) Drake – Davion Cherwin 25-yard run (kick failed) (Drive: 7 plays, 71 yards, 4:04; Drake 19–0)

Fourth quarter

| Statistics | MRST | DRKE |
|---|---|---|
| First downs | 16 | 16 |
| Total yards | 239 | 351 |
| Rushing yards | 84 | 135 |
| Passing yards | 155 | 216 |
| Passing: Comp–Att–Int | 22–38–1 | 20–37–1 |
| Time of possession | 32:31 | 27:29 |

| Team | Category | Player | Statistics |
|---|---|---|---|
| Marist | Passing | Sonny Mannino | 19/33, 120 yards |
| Marist | Rushing | Tristain Shannon | 7 carries, 26 yards |
| Marist | Receiving | Tristain Shannon | 5 catches, 44 yards |
| Drake | Passing | Luke Bailey | 18/25, 206 yards, 1 TD, 1 INT |
| Drake | Rushing | Luke Woodson | 9 carries, 70 yards |
| Drake | Receiving | Taj Hughes | 5 catches, 79 yards |

=== at St. Thomas ===
Game Eight – Drake Bulldogs (6–1) at St. Thomas Tommies (4–4) – Game summary

| Quarter | 1 | 2 | 3 | 4 | Total |
|---|---|---|---|---|---|
| Bulldogs | 0 | 10 | 7 | 5 | 22 |
| Tommies | 0 | 10 | 3 | 6 | 19 |

at O'Shaughnessy Stadium, Saint Paul, Minnesota

- Date: Saturday November 9, 2024
- Game time: 1:00 p.m.
- Game weather: 52 °F (11 °C)
- Game attendance: 5,370
- Referee: Matt Jones
- TV announcers (ESPN+): Corbu Stathes & Chris Ohm

Game information

First quarter
Second quarter

- (11:33) Drake – Trey Radocha 11-yard pass from Luke Bailey (Shane Dunning kick) (Drive: 10 plays, 80 yards, 6:50; Drake 7–0)
- (5:44) Drake – Shane Dunning 45-yard field goal (Drive: 11 plays, 18 yards, 6:17; Drake 10–0)
- (1:39) UST – Ben Holland 27-yard field goal (Drive: 10 plays, 71 yards, 4:00; Drake 10–3)
- (0:16) UST – Hope Adebayo 1-yard run (Drive: 4 plays, 33 yards, 1:07; Tied 10–10)

Third quarter

- (9:09) Drake – Taj Hughes 5-yard pass from Luke Bailey (Shane Dunning kick) (Drive: 3 plays, 10 yards, 1:25; Drake 17–10)
- (3:33) UST – Ben Holland 28-yard field goal (Drive: 10 plays, 19 yards, 5:24; Drake 17–13)

Fourth quarter

- (13:58) Drake – Intentional grounding in end zone; Drake 19–13)
- (7:00) Drake – Shane Dunning 52-yard field goal (Drive: 5 plays, 19 yards, 2:17; Drake 22–13)
- (1:54) UST – Colin Chase 44-yard pass from Tak Tateoka (kick blocked) (Drive: 8 plays, 88 yards, 1:55; Drake 22–19)

=== Morehead State ===
Game Nine – Morehead State Eagles (4–2) at Drake Bulldogs (7–1) – Game summary

| Quarter | 1 | 2 | 3 | 4 | Total |
|---|---|---|---|---|---|
| Eagles | 0 | 0 | 13 | 16 | 29 |
| Bulldogs | 2 | 7 | 3 | 8 | 20 |

at Drake Stadium, Des Moines, Iowa

- Date: Saturday November 16, 2024
- Game time: 1:00 p.m.
- TV announcers (ESPN+): TBD

Game information

First quarter
Second quarter
Third quarter
Fourth quarter

=== at Stetson ===
Game Ten – Drake Bulldogs (7–2) at Stetson Hatters (2–8) – Game summary

| Quarter | 1 | 2 | 3 | 4 | Total |
|---|---|---|---|---|---|
| Bulldogs | 14 | 14 | 14 | 7 | 49 |
| Hatters | 7 | 3 | 0 | 0 | 10 |

at Spec Martin Stadium, DeLand, Florida

- Date: Saturday November 23, 2024
- Game time: 1:00 p.m.
- Game attendance: 1,244
- TV announcers (ESPN+): TBD

Game information

First quarter
Second quarter
Third quarter
Fourth quarter

=== at No. 14 Tarleton State (NCAA Division I playoff–first round) ===
Game Eleven – Drake Bulldogs (8–2) vs No. 14 Tarleton State Texans (9–3) – Game summary

| Quarter | 1 | 2 | 3 | 4 | Total |
|---|---|---|---|---|---|
| Bulldogs | 14 | 0 | 7 | 8 | 29 |
| No. 14 Texans | 3 | 19 | 7 | 14 | 43 |

at Memorial Stadium • Stephenville, TX

- Date: Saturday November 30, 2024
- Game time: 2:00 p.m.
- TV announcers (ESPN+): Peter Sousa (play-by-play) and Dave Steckel (analyst)

Game information

First quarter
Second quarter
Third quarter
Fourth quarter
