= Brian Young (American football, born 1972) =

American football coach (born 1972)

Current position
- Title: Consultant to the defensive coordinator
- Team: Florida Atlantic
- Conference: American

Biographical details
- Born: June 8, 1972 (age 54)
- Education: Georgia Southern University (1997)

Playing career
- c. 1996: Georgia Southern
- 2000: Bismarck Blaze
- 2001: Duluth-Superior Lumberjacks
- Position: Defensive back

Coaching career (HC unless noted)

Football
- ?: Statesboro HS
- 1998: Alfred E. Beach HS (DC/ST)
- 1999–2001: Savannah HS (?)
- c. 2002: Georgia Force (asst.)
- c. 2003: Grand Rapids Rampage (DB)
- 2004: Louisiana College (S/ST)
- 2005: Grand Rapids Rampage (DC)
- 2005: Canton Legends
- 2005–2009: Mississippi College (S/SCT/RC/DC)
- 2010–2011: Cornell (DB)
- 2013–2019: Stetson (DC)
- 2020: Georgia Southern (SDA)
- 2021–2024: Stetson
- 2025–present: Florida Atlantic (CTDC)

Basketball
- ?: Alfred E. Beach HS
- 1999–2001: Savannah HS (assistant)

Head coaching record
- Overall: 13–30 (college)

Brian Young (born June 8, 1972) is an American football coach and former defensive back who is currently the consultant to the defensive coordinator at Florida Atlantic, a position he has held since 2025. He previously the head coach of the Stetson Hatters of the Pioneer Football League (PFL). He played college football at Georgia Southern and was in the Indoor Football League (IFL) before starting a coaching career in c. 2002.

== Early life and playing career ==
Young was born on June 8, 1972. He attended Groves High School, where he was a "pretty good" three-sport athlete. He played defensive back at Georgia Southern, where he earned a B.S. in 1997.

Young was invited to NFL training camps in 1998 and 1999, but did not sign with a team. He later played briefly in the Indoor Football League (IFL) with the Bismarck Blaze and Duluth-Superior Lumberjacks.

== Coaching career ==
Young coached Alfred E. Beach High School and Savannah High School in football and basketball, leading his Savannah basketball team to a 32–2 record and a state runner-up finish.

In c. 2002, Young became an assistant coach for the Georgia Force of the Arena Football League (AFL). He later served as secondary and defensive backs coach for the Grand Rapids Rampage, before joining Louisiana College in 2004 as secondary and special teams coach. He returned to the Grand Rapids Rampage as defensive coordinator in 2005, and after that season finished, became head coach of the Canton Legends.

In 2005, Young became secondary and special teams coach at Mississippi College, eventually being named recruiting coordinator and defensive coordinator as well. He left to become the defensive backs coach at Cornell in 2010, where he served two seasons.

In 2013, Young was named defensive coordinator at Stetson University, which was bringing back their football team for the first time since the 1950s. He served seven seasons in that position, helping the team place first or second in conference pass defense in every year.

Young left Stetson to become senior defensive analyst at Georgia Southern in 2020. He came back to Stetson in 2021, being named head coach. He led them to a 4–7 record in his first year as head coach. Young resigned on December 3, 2024 following his fourth season at Stetson, finishing with a record of 13–30.

== Head coaching record ==
Year	Team	Overall	Conference	Standing	Bowl/playoffs
Stetson Hatters (Pioneer Football League) (2021–present)
2021	Stetson	4–7	2–6	8th	
2022	Stetson	4–6	2–5	9th	
2023	Stetson	3–8	1–7	11th	
2024	Stetson	2–9	0–7	11th	
Stetson:		13–30	5–25		
Total:		13–30			
