= 2024 Marist Red Foxes football team =

American college football season

2024 Marist Red Foxes football
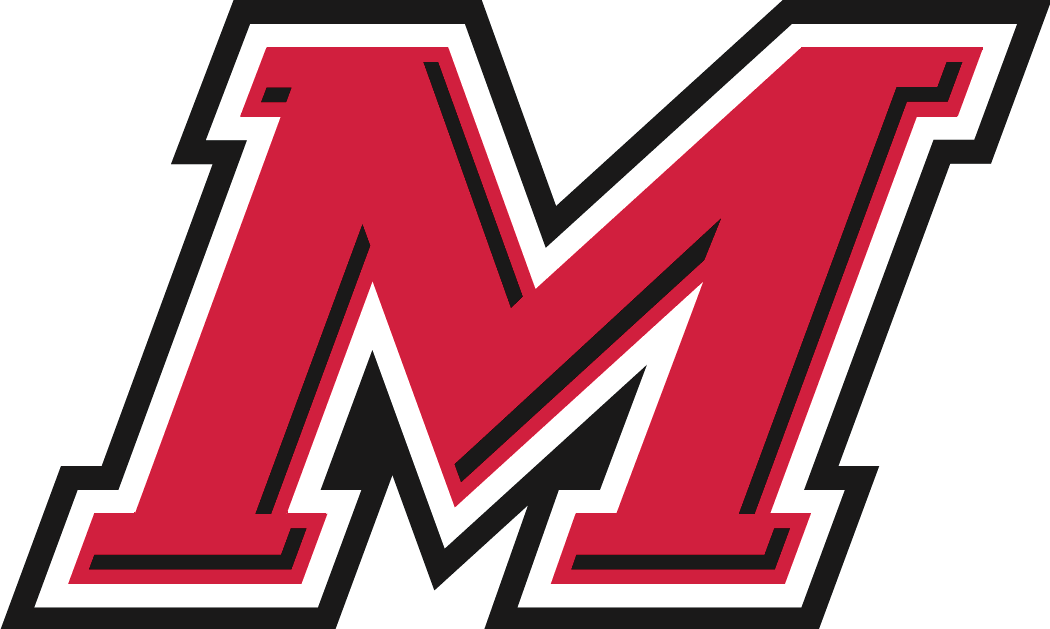
- Conference: Pioneer Football League
- Record: 1–10 (1–7 PFL)
- Head coach: Mike Willis (1st season)
- Offensive coordinator: Bob Davies (1st season)
- Defensive coordinator: Mike Horan (1st season)
- Home stadium: Tenney Stadium at Leonidoff Field

2024 Pioneer Football League standings
	Conf.			Overall
Team	W		L	W		L
Drake $^	7	–	1	8	–	3
San Diego	6	–	2	8	–	3
Butler	5	–	3	9	–	3
Morehead State	5	–	3	7	–	5
St. Thomas (MN)*	5	–	3	6	–	6
Dayton	4	–	4	6	–	5
Davidson	4	–	4	6	–	5
Presbyterian	4	–	4	6	–	6
Valparaiso	2	–	5	4	–	7
Marist	1	–	7	1	–	10
Stetson	0	–	7	2	–	9
$ – Conference champion; ^ – FCS playoff participant; * – St. Thomas (MN) ineligible for FCS postseason play due to transition from NCAA Division III; Rankings from STATS Poll

The 2024 Marist Red Foxes football team represented Marist University as a member of the Pioneer Football League (PFL) during the 2024 NCAA Division I FCS football season. Led by first-year head coach Mike Willis, the Red Foxes compiled an overall record of 1–10 with a mark of 1–7 in conference play, placing tenth in the PFL. The team played home games at Tenney Stadium at Leonidoff Field in Poughkeepsie, New York.

== Schedule ==
Date	Time	Opponent	Site	TV	Result	Attendance
September 7	12:00 p.m.	Georgetown*	Tenney Stadium at Leonidoff Field; Poughkeepsie, NY	ESPN+	L 10–31	2,677
September 14	12:30 p.m.	at No. 19 Lafayette*	Fisher Stadium; Easton, PA	ESPN+	L 14–56	4,418
September 21	6:00 p.m.	at Bucknell*	Christy Mathewson-Memorial Stadium; Lewisburg, PA	ESPN+	L 18–34	2,474
September 28	12:00 p.m.	Dayton	Leonidoff Field; Poughkeepsie, NY	ESPN+	L 14–47	6,567
October 5	1:00 p.m.	at Davidson	Richardson Stadium; Davidson, NC	ESPN+	L 19–42	2,124
October 12	12:00 p.m.	St. Thomas (MN)	Leonidoff Field; Poughkeepsie, NY	ESPN+	L 32–39	1,840
October 19	5:00 p.m.	at San Diego	Torero Stadium; San Diego, CA	ESPN+	L 6–34	3,017
October 26	12:00 p.m.	Valparaiso^{†}	Leonidoff Field; Poughkeepsie, NY	ESPN+	L 14–17	1,547
November 2	2:00 p.m.	at Drake	Drake Stadium; Des Moines, IA	ESPN+	L 0–19	2,636
November 9	1:00 p.m.	at Stetson	Spec Martin Stadium; DeLand, FL	ESPN+	W 40–31	1,568
November 16	12:00 p.m.	Presbyterian	Leonidoff Field; Poughkeepsie, NY	ESPN+	L 23–42	1,393
*Non-conference game; ^{†}Homecoming; Rankings from STATS Poll released prior to the game; All times are in Eastern time
