= 2024 Dayton Flyers football team =

American college football season

2024 Dayton Flyers football
- Conference: Pioneer Football League
- Record: 6–5 (4–4 PFL)
- Head coach: Trevor Andrews (2nd season)
- Offensive coordinator: Greg Whalen (2nd season)
- Defensive coordinator: John Bowles (2nd season)
- Home stadium: Welcome Stadium

2024 Pioneer Football League standings
	Conf.			Overall
Team	W		L	W		L
Drake $^	7	–	1	8	–	3
San Diego	6	–	2	8	–	3
Butler	5	–	3	9	–	3
Morehead State	5	–	3	7	–	5
St. Thomas (MN)*	5	–	3	6	–	6
Dayton	4	–	4	6	–	5
Davidson	4	–	4	6	–	5
Presbyterian	4	–	4	6	–	6
Valparaiso	2	–	5	4	–	7
Marist	1	–	7	1	–	10
Stetson	0	–	7	2	–	9
$ – Conference champion; ^ – FCS playoff participant; * – St. Thomas (MN) ineligible for FCS postseason play due to transition from NCAA Division III; Rankings from STATS Poll

The 2024 Dayton Flyers football team represented the University of Dayton as a member of the Pioneer Football League (PFL) during the 2024 NCAA Division I FCS football season. The Flyers were led by second-year head coach Trevor Andrews and played home games at Welcome Stadium in Dayton, Ohio.

== Schedule ==
Date	Time	Opponent	Site	TV	Result	Attendance
August 31	12:00 pm	Saint Francis (PA)*	Welcome Stadium; Dayton, OH	Facebook Live	W 18–10	2,850
September 14	6:00 pm	at Indiana State*	Memorial Stadium; Terre Haute, IN	ESPN+	L 13–24	3,614
September 21	12:00 pm	Ave Maria*	Welcome Stadium; Dayton, OH	Facebook Live	W 49–7	3,225
September 28	12:00 pm	at Marist	Leonidoff Field; Poughkeepsie, NY	ESPN+	W 47–14	6,567
October 12	12:00 pm	Davidson	Welcome Stadium; Dayton, OH	Facebook Live	W 16–14	2,757
October 19	1:00 pm	at Butler	Bud and Jackie Sellick Bowl; Indianapolis, IN	FloFootball	W 21–14	2,578
October 26	12:00 pm	Morehead State	Welcome Stadium; Dayton, OH	Facebook Live	L 6–14	2,826
November 2	1:00 pm	at Presbyterian	Bailey Memorial Stadium; Clinton, SC	ESPN+	L 7–28	1,001
November 9	12:00 pm	San Diego	Welcome Stadium; Dayton, OH	Facebook Live	L 10–16	3,152
November 16	12:00 pm	Valparaiso	Welcome Stadium; Dayton, OH	Facebook Live	W 26–14	2,921
November 23	2:00 pm	at St. Thomas	O'Shaughnessy Stadium; St. Paul, MN		L 9–32	2,171
*Non-conference game; All times are in Eastern time

== Game summaries ==
=== Saint Francis (PA) ===
Game One – Saint Francis Red Flash (0–0) at Dayton Flyers (0–0) – Game summary

Quarter	1	2	3	4	Total
Red Flash	0	3	7	0	10
Flyers	9	0	9	0	18

at Welcome Stadium • Dayton, OH

- Date: August 31, 2024
- Game time: 12:06 pm
- Game weather: Cloudy, 80 °F (27 °C)
- Game attendance: 2,850
- Referee: John Shay
- TV announcers (Facebook Live): TBD
- Box Score (Dayton) Recap (Dayton)

Game information

First quarter

- 7:51 DAY - Gavin Lochow 12-yard pass from Drew VanVleet (Danny Baker kick), (Drive: 11 plays, 28 yards, 5:55; Dayton 7–0)
- 0:59 DAY - 0-yard safety ; (Dayton 9–0)

Second quarter

- 6:25 SFU - Mac Plummer 26-yard field goal (Drive: 4 plays, 4 yards, 1:28; Dayton 9–3)

Third quarter

- 11:04 DAY - Luke Brenner 27-yard pass from Gavin Lochow, (Drive: 8 plays, 74 yards, 3:54; Dayton 15–3)
- 5:24 SFU - Markell Holman 1-yard run (Mac Plummer kick), (Drive: 6 plays, 36 yards, 2:26; Dayton 15–10)
- 0:07 DAY - Danny Baker 44-yard field goal, (Drive: 11 plays, 36 yards, 5:09; Dayton 18–10)

Fourth quarter

- No scoring

Statistics	SFPA	DAY
First downs	13	16
Total yards	247	196
Rushing yards	126	40
Passing yards	121	156
Passing: Comp–Att–Int	15–26–0	16–23–0
Time of possession	24:46	35:14

Team	Category	Player	Statistics
Saint Francis (PA)	Passing	Nick Whitfield, Jr.	15/26, 121 yards
Saint Francis (PA)	Rushing	DeMarcus McElroy	9 carries, 69 yards
Saint Francis (PA)	Receiving	Gavin Thomson	3 receptions, 44 yards
Dayton	Passing	Drew VanVleet	15/22, 129 yards, 1 TD
Dayton	Rushing	Mason Hackett	18 carries, 60 yards
Dayton	Receiving	Gavin Lochow	8 receptions, 55 yards, 1 TD

=== at Butler ===
Game Six – Dayton Flyers (4–1) at Butler Bulldogs (5–1) – Game summary

Quarter	1	2	3	4	Total
Flyers	0	7	7	7	21
Bulldogs	0	3	3	8	14

at Bud and Jackie Sellick Bowl • Indianapolis, Indiana

- Date: Saturday October 19, 2024
- Game time: 1:00 p.m. EST
- Game weather: Sunny • Temperature: 60 °F (16 °C) • Wind: SE at 2 miles per hour (3.2 km/h)
- Game attendance: 2,578
- Referee: John Shay
- TV: FloFootball

Game information

First quarter

No scoring plays

Second quarter

- (5:01) DAY – Jake Coleman 8-yard pass from Drew VanVleet, Danny Baker kick (Drive: 3 plays, 10 yards, 0:51; Dayton 7–0)
- (0:00) BUT – Ryan Short 32-yard field goal (Drive: 12 plays, 60 yards, 4:57; Dayton 7–3)

Third quarter

- (4:36) DAY – Luke Brenner 22-yard pass from Drew VanVleet, Danny Baker kick (Drive: 10 plays, 57 yards, 5:29; Dayton 14–3)
- (0:37) BUT – Ryan Short 37-yard field goal (Drive: 7 plays, 56 yards, 3:59; Dayton 14–6)

Fourth quarter

- (5:38) BUT – Reagan Andrew 8-yard run, Nick Howard run (Drive: 12 plays, 81 yards, 6:28; Tied 14–14)
- (0:11) DAY – Luke Brenner 33-yard pass from Drew VanVleet, Danny Baker kick (Drive: 10 plays, 93 yards, 5:21; Dayton 21–14)

Statistics	DAY	BUT
First downs	19	13
Total yards	320	260
Rushing yards	183	163
Passing yards	137	97
Passing: Comp–Att–Int	11–15–0	13–19–1
Time of possession	35:18	24:42

Team	Category	Player	Statistics
Dayton	Passing	Drew VanVleet	11/14, 137 yards, 3 TD
Dayton	Rushing	Mason Hackett	35 carries, 111 yards
Dayton	Receiving	Luke Brenner	3 receptions, 56 yards, 2 TD
Butler	Passing	Reagan Andrew	10/14, 50 yards, INT
Butler	Rushing	Reagan Andrew	8 carries, 87 yards, TD
Butler	Receiving	Luke Wooten	6 receptions, 50 yards
