= 2024 San Diego Toreros football team =

American college football season

2024 San Diego Toreros football
- Conference: Pioneer Football League
- Record: 8–3 (6–2 PFL)
- Head coach: Brandon Moore (2nd season)
- Offensive coordinator: Matt Aponte (2nd season)
- Defensive coordinator: Isaac Carter (2nd season)
- Co-defensive coordinator: Mike McGlinchey Jr. (2nd season)
- Home stadium: Torero Stadium

2024 Pioneer Football League standings
	Conf.			Overall
Team	W		L	W		L
Drake $^	7	–	1	8	–	3
San Diego	6	–	2	8	–	3
Butler	5	–	3	9	–	3
Morehead State	5	–	3	7	–	5
St. Thomas (MN)*	5	–	3	6	–	6
Dayton	4	–	4	6	–	5
Davidson	4	–	4	6	–	5
Presbyterian	4	–	4	6	–	6
Valparaiso	2	–	5	4	–	7
Marist	1	–	7	1	–	10
Stetson	0	–	7	2	–	9
$ – Conference champion; ^ – FCS playoff participant; * – St. Thomas (MN) ineligible for FCS postseason play due to transition from NCAA Division III; Rankings from STATS Poll

The 2024 San Diego Toreros football team represented the University of San Diego as a member of the Pioneer Football League (PFL) during the 2024 NCAA Division I FCS football season. Led by second-year head coach Brandon Moore, the Toreros played home games at Torero Stadium in San Diego.

== Schedule ==
Date	Time	Opponent	Site	TV	Result	Attendance
August 31	5:00 p.m.	Cal Poly*	Torero Stadium; San Diego, CA	ESPN+	W 27–21	5,792
September 7	1:00 p.m.	Central Washington*	Torero Stadium; San Diego, CA	ESPN+	W 26–7	1,867
September 21	11:00 a.m.	at No. 10 North Dakota*	Alerus Center; Grand Forks, ND	ESPN+	L 24–41	8,491
September 28	10:00 a.m.	at Drake	Drake Stadium; Des Moines, IA	ESPN+	L 28–30	4,568
October 5	1:00 p.m.	Presbyterian	Torero Stadium; San Diego, CA	ESPN+	W 27–21 ^{OT}	1,012
October 19	2:00 p.m.	Marist	Torero Stadium; San Diego, CA	ESPN+	W 34–6	3,017
October 26	10:00 a.m.	at St. Thomas (MN)	O'Shaughnessy Stadium; Saint Paul, MN	ESPN+	L 14–34	1,512
November 2	1:00 p.m.	Davidson	Torero Stadium; San Diego, CA	ESPN+	W 40–13	1,672
November 9	9:00 a.m.	at Dayton	Welcome Stadium; Dayton, OH	Facebook Live	W 16–10	3,152
November 16	1:00 p.m.	Stetson	Torero Stadium; San Diego, CA	ESPN+	W 45–6	1,996
November 23	10:00 a.m.	at Morehead State	Jayne Stadium; Morehead, KY	ESPN+	W 37–14	3,800
*Non-conference game; Rankings from STATS Poll released prior to the game; All times are in Pacific time

== Game summaries ==
=== at Drake ===
Game Four – San Diego Toreros (2–1) at Drake Bulldogs (1–1) – Game summary

Quarter	1	2	3	4	Total
Toreros	6	3	0	19	28
Bulldogs	3	10	7	10	30

at Drake Stadium • Des Moines, IA

- Date: Saturday September 28, 2024
- Game time: 10:00 a.m.
- Game weather: 78 °F (26 °C)
- Game attendance: 4,568
- Referee: Jason Berg
- TV announcers (ESPN+): Chuck Reed (play-by-play) and Craig Wederquist (analyst)

Game information

First quarter

- 10:31 USD – Josh Heverly 17-yard pass from Grant Sergent (Aidan Lehman kick blocked) (Drive: 7 plays, 76 yards, 4:24; USD 6–0)
- 7:03 Drake – Shane Dunning 23-yard field goal (Drive: 7 plays, 46 yards, 3:16; USD 6–3)

Second quarter

- 12:17 USD – Aidan Lehman 30-yard field goal (Drive: 13 plays, 82 yards, 5:28; USD 9–3)
- 6:58 Drake – Shane Dunning 42-yard field goal (Drive: 3 plays, 16 yards, 0:39; USD 9–6)
- 0:52 Drake – Trey Radocha 3-yard pass from Luke Bailey (Shane Dunning kick) (Drive: 9 plays, 51 yards, 4:50; Drake 13–9)

Third quarter

- 2:24 Drake – Blake Ellingson 41-yard run (Shane Dunnings kick) (Drive: 5 plays, 60 yards, 2:45; Drake 20–9)

Fourth quarter

- 12:53 Drake – Mitchell January 36-yard pass from Luke Bailey (Shane Dunning kick) (Drive: 1 play, 36 yards, 0:09; Drake 27–9)
- 11:30 USD – Logan Ginng 2-yard run (Grant Sergent pass) (Drive: 5 plays, 54 yards, 1:23; Drake 27–17)
- 6:34 USD – Aidan Lehman 26-yard field goal (Drive: 7 plays, 71 yards, 2:38; Drake 27–20)
- 6:24 USD – Safety, Drake penalty in end zone (Drake 27–22)
- 1:55 USD – Peyton Smith 5-yard pass from Grant Sergent (Grant Sergent pass failed) (Drive: 7 plays, 71 yards, 2:38; USD 28–27)
- 0:00 Drake – Shane Dunning 48-yard field goal (Drive: 8 plays, 62 yards, 0:44; Drake 30–28)

Statistics	USD	DRKE
First downs	23	16
Total yards	390	354
Rushing yards	98	91
Passing yards	292	263
Passing: Comp–Att–Int	25–40–1	29–49–0
Time of possession	33:45	26:15

Team	Category	Player	Statistics
San Diego	Passing	Grant Sergent	25/40, 292 yards, 2 TD, INT
San Diego	Rushing	Isaiah Smith	6 carries, 33 yards
San Diego	Receiving	Cole Monach	8 receptions, 122 yards
Drake	Passing	Luke Bailey	29/49, 263 yards, 2 TD
Drake	Rushing	Blake Ellingson	4 carries, 69 yards, TD
Drake	Receiving	Mitchell January	9 receptions, 121 yards, TD
