= 2024 Stetson Hatters football team =

American college football season

2024 Stetson Hatters football
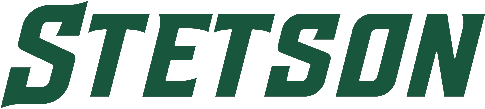
- Conference: Pioneer Football League
- Record: 2–9 (0–7 PFL)
- Head coach: Brian Young (4th season)
- Offensive coordinator: Sheldon Cross (1st season)
- Home stadium: Spec Martin Stadium

2024 Pioneer Football League standings
	Conf.			Overall
Team	W		L	W		L
Drake $^	7	–	1	8	–	3
San Diego	6	–	2	8	–	3
Butler	5	–	3	9	–	3
Morehead State	5	–	3	7	–	5
St. Thomas (MN)*	5	–	3	6	–	6
Dayton	4	–	4	6	–	5
Davidson	4	–	4	6	–	5
Presbyterian	4	–	4	6	–	6
Valparaiso	2	–	5	4	–	7
Marist	1	–	7	1	–	10
Stetson	0	–	7	2	–	9
$ – Conference champion; ^ – FCS playoff participant; * – St. Thomas (MN) ineligible for FCS postseason play due to transition from NCAA Division III; Rankings from STATS Poll

The 2024 Stetson Hatters football team represented Stetson University as a member of the Pioneer Football League (PFL) during the 2024 NCAA Division I FCS football season. Led by Brian Young in his fourth and final season as head coach, the Hatters compiled an overall record of 2–9 with a mark of 0–7 in conference play, placing last out of 11 teams in the PFL. Stetson played home games at Spec Martin Stadium in DeLand, Florida.

== Schedule ==
Date	Time	Opponent	Site	TV	Result	Attendance	Source
August 31	6:00 p.m.	Ave Maria*	Spec Martin Stadium; DeLand, FL	ESPN+	W 41–3	1,633	
September 7	6:00 p.m.	Warner*	Spec Martin Stadium; DeLand, FL	ESPN+	W 35–0	1,354	
September 14	2:00 p.m.	at Furman*	Paladin Stadium; Greenville, SC	ESPN+	L 7–48	7,917	
September 21	12:00 p.m.	at Harvard*	Harvard Stadium; Cambridge, MA	ESPN+	L 0–35	4,488	
October 5	1:00 p.m.	at St. Thomas (MN)	O'Shaughnessy Stadium; St. Paul, MN	ESPN+	L 24–34	3,495	
October 12	1:00 p.m.	Valparaiso	Spec Martin Stadium; DeLand, FL	ESPN+	Cancelled (Note: This game was cancelled in anticipation of Hurricane Milton.)		
October 19	1:00 p.m.	at Davidson	Richardson Stadium; Davidson, NC	ESPN+	L 48–70	2,367	
October 26	1:00 p.m.	Presbyterian	Spec Martin Stadium; DeLand, FL	ESPN+	L 14–42	1,777	
November 2	1:00 p.m.	at Butler	Bud and Jackie Sellick Bowl; Indianapolis, IN	FloSports	L 13–46	2,518	
November 9	1:00 p.m.	Marist	Spec Martin Stadium; DeLand, FL	ESPN+	L 31–40	1,568	
November 16	4:00 p.m.	at San Diego	Torero Stadium; San Diego, CA	ESPN+	L 6–45	1,996	
November 23	1:00 p.m.	Drake	Spec Martin Stadium; DeLand, FL	ESPN+	L 10–49	1,244	
*Non-conference game; All times are in Eastern time

== Game summaries ==
=== at Butler ===
Game Nine – Stetson Hatters (2–5) at Butler Bulldogs (6–2) – Game summary

Quarter	1	2	3	4	Total
Hatters	0	0	7	6	13
Bulldogs	10	15	7	14	46

at Bud and Jackie Sellick Bowl • Indianapolis, Indiana

- Date: Saturday November 2, 2024
- Game time: 1:00 p.m. EST
- Game weather: Sunny • Temperature: 50 °F (10 °C) • Wind: SE at 5 miles per hour (8.0 km/h)
- Game attendance: 2,518
- Referee: David Hergert
- TV announcers (FloFootball): Ben Buttrick, Matt Sherwin

Game information

First quarter

- (11:40) BUT – Griffin Caldwell 11-yard run, Ryan Short kick (Drive: 6 plays, 80 yards, 3:15; Butler 7–0)
- (5:30) BUT – Ryan Short 35-yard field goal (Drive: 9 plays, 60 yards, 5:17; Butler 10–0)

Second quarter

- (10:31) BUT – Trevon Brown 10-yard pass from Nick Howard, Ryan Short kick (Drive: 11 plays, 98 yards, 6:15; Butler 17–0)
- (0:23) BUT – Nick Howard 7-yard run, Reagan Andrew run (Drive: 14 plays, 64 yards, 4:31; Butler 25–0)

Third quarter

- (8:36) BUT – Nick Howard 8-yard run, Ryan Short kick (Drive: 10 plays, 76 yards, 5:01; Butler 32–0)
- (4:37) STET – Dalton Bailey 20-yard pass from Brady Meitz, Daniel Holbrook kick (Drive: 11 plays, 75 yards, 3:59; Butler 32–7)

Fourth quarter

- (11:53) BUT – Nick Howard 5-yard run, Ryan Short kick (Drive: 8 plays, 39 yards, 3:45; Butler 39–7)
- (4:27) BUT – Jeremiah Jackson 100-yard interception return, Sam Taglia kick (Butler 46–7)
- (1:27) STET – Donovan Snyder 2-yard run (Drive: 12 plays, 75 yards, 2:56; Butler 46–13)

Statistics	STET	BUT
First downs	22	24
Total yards	329	471
Rushing yards	119	283
Passing yards	210	188
Passing: Comp–Att–Int	27–40–2	13–19–0
Time of possession	27:20	32:40

Team	Category	Player	Statistics
Stetson	Passing	Brady Meitz	27/40, 210 yards, TD, 2 INT
Stetson	Rushing	Donovan Snyder	16 carries, 57 yards, TD
Stetson	Receiving	Dalton Bailey	10 receptions, 91 yards, TD
Butler	Passing	Reagan Andrew	11/15, 144 yards
Butler	Rushing	Nick Howard	19 carries, 92 yards, 3 TD
Butler	Receiving	Ethan Loss	3 receptions, 47 yards
