= 2024 Morehead State Eagles football team =

American college football season

2024 Morehead State Eagles football
- Conference: Pioneer Football League
- Record: 7–5 (5–3 PFL)
- Head coach: Jason Woodman (1st season)
- Defensive coordinator: Wil Truelove (1st season)
- Home stadium: Jayne Stadium

2024 Pioneer Football League standings
	Conf.			Overall
Team	W		L	W		L
Drake $^	7	–	1	8	–	3
San Diego	6	–	2	8	–	3
Butler	5	–	3	9	–	3
Morehead State	5	–	3	7	–	5
St. Thomas (MN)*	5	–	3	6	–	6
Dayton	4	–	4	6	–	5
Davidson	4	–	4	6	–	5
Presbyterian	4	–	4	6	–	6
Valparaiso	2	–	5	4	–	7
Marist	1	–	7	1	–	10
Stetson	0	–	7	2	–	9
$ – Conference champion; ^ – FCS playoff participant; * – St. Thomas (MN) ineligible for FCS postseason play due to transition from NCAA Division III; Rankings from STATS Poll

The 2024 Morehead State Eagles football team represented Morehead State University as a member of the Pioneer Football League during the 2024 NCAA Division I FCS football season. The Eagles were led by first-year head coach Jason Woodman and played home games at Jayne Stadium located in Morehead, Kentucky.

== Schedule ==
Date	Time	Opponent	Site	TV	Result	Attendance
August 29	6:00 p.m.	Central State (OH)*	Jayne Stadium; Morehead, KY	ESPN+	W 17–10	6,155
September 7	6:00 p.m.	Kentucky Christian*	Jayne Stadium; Morehead, KY	ESPN+	W 48–7	8,188
September 14	3:00 p.m.	at No. 8 Montana*	Washington–Grizzly Stadium; Missoula, MT	ESPN+	L 2–59	25,808
September 21	6:00 p.m.	at Eastern Kentucky*	Roy Kidd Stadium; Richmond, KY (Old Hawg Rifle)	ESPN+	L 13–42	7,087
September 28	1:00 p.m.	Valparaiso	Jayne Stadium; Morehead, KY	ESPN+	W 17–5	2,552
October 5	1:00 p.m.	at Butler	Bud and Jackie Sellick Bowl; Indianapolis, IN	ESPN+	L 6–40	4,516
October 12	2:00 p.m.	Presbyterian^{†}	Jayne Stadium; Morehead, KY	ESPN+	W 14–7	8,285
October 26	12:00 p.m.	at Dayton	Welcome Stadium; Dayton, OH	Facebook Live	W 14–6	2,826
November 2	1:00 p.m.	St. Thomas (MN)	Jayne Stadium; Morehead, KY	ESPN+	W 21–7	4,105
November 9	1:00 p.m.	at Davidson	Richardson Stadium; Davidson, NC	ESPN+	L 14–31	2,356
November 16	1:00 p.m.	at Drake	Drake Stadium; Des Moines, IA	ESPN+	W 29–20	2,976
November 23	1:00 p.m.	San Diego	Jayne Stadium; Morehead, KY	ESPN+	L 14–37	3,800
*Non-conference game; ^{†}Homecoming; Rankings from STATS Poll released prior to the game; All times are in Eastern time

== Game summaries ==
=== at No. 8 Montana ===
Game Three – Morehead State Eagles (2–0) at No. 8 Montana Grizzlies (1–1) – Game summary

Quarter	1	2	3	4	Total
Eagles	0	0	2	0	2
No. 8 Grizzlies	15	24	13	7	59

at Washington-Grizzly Stadium, Missoula, MT

- Date: Saturday September 14, 2024
- Game time: 3:00 PM
- Game attendance: 25,808
- TV announcers (ESPN+/MTN): Jay Kohn, Marty Mornhinweg, Kyle Hansen

Statistics	MORE	MONT
First downs		
Total yards		
Rushing yards		
Passing yards		
Passing: Comp–Att–Int		
Time of possession		

Team	Category	Player	Statistics
Morehead State	Passing		
Morehead State	Rushing		
Morehead State	Receiving		
Montana	Passing		
Montana	Rushing		
Montana	Receiving		

=== at Eastern Kentucky (Old Hawg Rifle) ===
Game Four – Morehead State Eagles (2–1) vs Eastern Kentucky Colonels (1–2) – Game summary

Quarter	1	2	3	4	Total
Eagles	3	7	3	0	13
Colonels	14	7	7	14	42

at Roy Kidd Stadium • Richmond, KY

- Date: Saturday September 21, 2024
- Game time: 6:00 p.m.
- Game weather: Cloudy • Temperature: 84 °F (29 °C)
- Game attendance: 7,087
- Referee: Michael Frain
- TV announcers (ESPN+): TBD

Game information

First quarter

- MSU – Thomas Schwartz V 31-yard field goal, 8:44. Morehead State 3–0. Drive: 8 plays, 19 yards, 3:55.
- EKU – Dequan Stanley 21-yard pass from Matt Morrissey (Patrick Nations kick), 3:35. Eastern Kentucky 7–3. Drive: 10 plays, 81 yards, 5:03.
- EKU – Joshua Carter 14-yard run (Patrick Nations kick), 1:15. Eastern Kentucky 14–3. Drive: 2 plays, 22 yards, 0:37.

Second quarter

- MSU – Isaac Stopke 2-yard run (Thomas Schwartz V kick), 11:59. Eastern Kentucky 14–10. Drive: 7 plays, 75 yards, 4:16.
- EKU – Dequan Stanley 27-yard pass from Matt Morrissey (Patrick Nations kick), 4:47. Eastern Kentucky 21–10. Drive: 2 plays, 26 yards, 0:51.

Third quarter

- EKU – Matt Morrissey 1-yard run (Patrick Nations kick), 10:12. Eastern Kentucky 28–10. Drive: 8 plays, 84 yards, 4:41.
- MSU – Thomas Schwartz V 34-yard field goal, 1:18. Eastern Kentucky 28–13. Drive: 9 plays, 63 yards, 3:41.

Fourth quarter

- EKU – Brayden Latham 7-yard run (Patrick Nations kick), 11:23. Eastern Kentucky 35–10. Drive: 9 plays, 85 yards, 4:50.
- EKU – Telly McCallister 11-yard run (Patrick Nations kick), 4:13. Eastern Kentucky 42–10. Drive: 8 plays, 71 yards, 4:06.

Statistics	MORE	EKU
First downs	13	27
Total yards	228	463
Rushing yards	77	301
Passing yards	151	162
Passing: Comp–Att–Int	14–27–2	13–19–0
Time of possession	31:08	28:52

Team	Category	Player	Statistics
Morehead State	Passing	Bryce Patterson	8/14, 106 yds, INT
Morehead State	Rushing	James Louis	13 rushes, 69 yds
Morehead State	Receiving	Nathan Garnett Jr.	4 receptions, 55 yds
Eastern Kentucky	Passing	Matt Morrissey	13/19, 162 yds, 2 TD
Eastern Kentucky	Rushing	Brayden Latham	11 rushes, 76 yds, TD
Eastern Kentucky	Receiving	Dequan Stanley	3 receptions, 49 yds, 2 TD
