= 2024 Valparaiso Beacons football team =

American college football season

2024 Valparaiso Beacons football
- Conference: Pioneer Football League
- Record: 4–7 (2–5 PFL)
- Head coach: Landon Fox (6th season)
- Offensive coordinator: Gibran Hamdan (1st season)
- Defensive coordinator: Dave Marquis (2nd season)
- Home stadium: Brown Field

2024 Pioneer Football League standings
	Conf.			Overall
Team	W		L	W		L
Drake $^	7	–	1	8	–	3
San Diego	6	–	2	8	–	3
Butler	5	–	3	9	–	3
Morehead State	5	–	3	7	–	5
St. Thomas (MN)*	5	–	3	6	–	6
Dayton	4	–	4	6	–	5
Davidson	4	–	4	6	–	5
Presbyterian	4	–	4	6	–	6
Valparaiso	2	–	5	4	–	7
Marist	1	–	7	1	–	10
Stetson	0	–	7	2	–	9
$ – Conference champion; ^ – FCS playoff participant; * – St. Thomas (MN) ineligible for FCS postseason play due to transition from NCAA Division III; Rankings from STATS Poll

The 2024 Valparaiso Beacons football team represented Valparaiso University as a member of the Pioneer Football League (PFL) during the 2024 NCAA Division I FCS football season. The Beacons were led by sixth-year head coach Landon Fox and played home games at Brown Field in Valparaiso, Indiana.

== Schedule ==
Date	Time	Opponent	Site	TV	Result	Attendance
August 31	4:00 p.m.	at Northern Iowa*	UNI-Dome; Cedar Falls, IA	ESPN+	L 7–35	8,458
September 7	1:00 p.m.	at No. 25 Youngstown State*	Stambaugh Stadium; Youngstown, OH	ESPN+	L 25–59	7,649
September 14	6:30 p.m.	Indiana Wesleyan*	Brown Field; Valparaiso, IN	ESPN+	W 20–17	2,780
September 21	1:00 p.m.	Roosevelt*	Brown Field; Valparaiso, IN	ESPN+	W 31–23 ^{2OT}	1,378
September 28	12:00 p.m.	at Morehead State	Jayne Stadium; Morehead, KY	ESPN+	L 5–17	2,552
October 5	12:00 p.m.	Drake^{†}	Brown Field; Valparaiso, IN	ESPN+	L 3–27	2,577
October 12	1:00 p.m.	Stetson	Spec Martin Stadium; DeLand, FL	ESPN+	Cancelled (Note: This game was cancelled in anticipation of Hurricane Milton.)	
October 19	1:00 p.m.	St. Thomas (MN)	Brown Field; Valparaiso, IN	ESPN+	L 14–42	1,461
October 26	11:00 a.m.	at Marist	Leonidoff Field; Poughkeepsie, NY	ESPN+	W 17–14	1,547
November 9	1:00 p.m.	Butler	Brown Field; Valparaiso, IN (rivalry)	ESPN+	L 17–24	1,783
November 16	11:00 a.m.	at Dayton	Welcome Stadium; Dayton, OH	Facebook Live	L 14–26	2,921
November 23	1:00 p.m.	Davidson	Brown Field; Valparaiso, IN	ESPN+	W 18–17	1,058
*Non-conference game; ^{†}Homecoming; Rankings from STATS Poll released prior to the game; All times are in Central time

== Game summaries ==
=== at Northern Iowa ===
Game One – Valparaiso Beacons (0–0) vs Northern Iowa Panthers (0–0) – Game summary

Quarter	1	2	3	4	Total
Beacons	0	7	0	0	7
Panthers	14	14	7	0	35

at UNI-Dome • Cedar Falls, IA

- Date: Saturday August 31, 2024
- Game time: 4:00 PM CDT
- Game weather: 72 °F (22 °C) (indoor)
- Game attendance: 8,458
- Referee: David Hergert
- TV: ESPN+

Game information

First quarter

- (10:04) UNI – Layne Pryor 21-yard pass from Aidan Dunne, Caden Palmer kick (Drive: 9 plays, 79 yards, 4:48; Northern Iowa 7–0)
- (2:48) UNI – Amauri Pesek-Hickson 20-yard pass from Aidan Dunne, Caden Palmer kick (Drive: 8 plays, 75 yards, 5:05; Northern Iowa 14–0)

Second quarter

- (14:06) UNI – Tye Edwards 54-yard run, Caden Palmer kick (Drive: 3 plays, 71 yards, 1:13; Northern Iowa 21–0)
- (11:12) VAL – Mike Mansaray 1-yard run, Ryan Hawk kick (Drive: 5 plays, 75 yards, 2:54; Northern Iowa 21–7)
- (3:28) UNI – Tye Edwards 12-yard run, Caden Palmer kick (Drive: 8 plays, 64 yards, 4:02; Northern Iowa 28–7)

Third quarter

- (10:35) UNI – Sergio Morancy 5-yard pass from Aidan Dunne, Caden Palmer kick (Drive: 6 plays, 71 yards, 2:59; Northern Iowa 35–7)

Fourth quarter

No scoring

Statistics	VAL	UNI
First downs	5	29
Total yards	137	481
Rushing yards	29	365
Passing yards	108	116
Passing: Comp–Att–Int	8-19-0	12-17-0
Time of possession	18:13	41:47

Team	Category	Player	Statistics
Valparaiso	Passing	Rowan Keefe	6/16, 101 yards
Valparaiso	Rushing	Caron Tyler	2 carries, 17 yards
Valparaiso	Receiving	Mike Mansaray	3 receptions, 79 yards
Northern Iowa	Passing	Aidan Dunne	12/17, 116 yards, 3 TD
Northern Iowa	Rushing	Tye Edwards	15 carries, 177 yards, 2 TD
Northern Iowa	Receiving	Layne Pryor	3 receptions, 44 yards, 1 TD

=== at No. 25 Youngstown State ===
Game Two – Valparaiso Beacons (0–1) vs No. 25 Youngstown State Penguins (0–1) – Game summary

Quarter	1	2	3	4	Total
Beacons	0	22	3	0	25
No. 25 Penguins	21	14	7	17	59

at Stambaugh Stadium • Youngstown, OH

- Date: Saturday September 7, 2024
- Game time: 2:00 PM EDT
- Game weather: Cloudy • Temperature: 60 °F (16 °C) • Wind: NW at 10 miles per hour (16 km/h)
- Game attendance: 7,649
- Referee: John Shay
- TV announcers (ESPN+): Drae Smith (play-by-play) and Chris Sammarone (analyst)

Game information

First quarter

- (14:44) YSU – Stephon Hall 4-yard fumble return, Andrew Lastovka kick (Drive: 1 play, -21 yards, 0:09; YSU 7–0)
- (9:03) YSU – Max Tomczak 73-yard pass from Beau Brungard, Andrew Lastovka kick (Drive: 6 plays, 87 yards, 3:42; YSU 14–0)
- (2:00) YSU – Beau Brungard 4-yard run, Andrew Lastovka kick (Drive: 9 plays, 58 yards, 6:03; YSU 21–0)

Second quarter

- (12:24) VAL – Gary Givens III 39-yard pass from Caron Tyler, Ryan Mann pass to Jake Vickers for two-point conversion (Drive: 9 plays, 76 yards, 4:29; YSU 21–8)
- (8:37) VAL – Caron Tyler 7-yard run, Ryan Hawk kick (Drive: 4 plays, 60 yards, 2:09; YSU 21–15)
- (6:05) YSU – Beau Brungard 65-yard run, Andrew Lastovka kick (Drive: 5 plays, 75 yards, 2:25; YSU 28–15)
- (2:30) Valparaiso – Caron Tyler 55-yard run, Ryan Hawk kick (Drive: 6 plays, 79 yards, 3:29; YSU 28–22)
- (1:49) YSU – Ethan Wright 64-yard run, Andrew Lastovka kick (Drive: 3 plays, 75 yards, 0:41; YSU 35–22)

Third quarter

- (14:14) YSU – Beau Brungard 66-yard run, Andrew Lastovka kick (Drive: 2 plays, 69 yards, 0:36; YSU 42–22)
- (6:15) VAL – Ryan Hawk 26-yard field goal (Drive: 7 plays, 63 yards, 3:10; YSU 42–25)

Fourth quarter

- (11:46) YSU – Max Tomczak 8-yard pass from Beau Brungard, Andrew Lastovka kick (Drive: 8 plays, 61 yards, 4:36; YSU 49–25)
- (5:56) YSU – Jaden Gilbert 36-yard run, Andrew Lastovka kick (Drive: 7 plays, 83 yards, 4:12; YSU 56–25)
- (1:59) YSU – Andrew Lastovka 29-yard field goal (Drive: 5 plays, 21 yards, 2:37; YSU 59–25)

Statistics	VAL	YSU
First downs	13	19
Total yards	331	554
Rushing yards	164	429
Passing yards	167	125
Passing: Comp–Att–Int	9–23–1	11–14–0
Time of possession	26:25	33:25

Team	Category	Player	Statistics
Valparaiso	Passing	Caron Tyler	8/17, 160 yards, TD, INT
Valparaiso	Rushing	Caron Tyler	15 carries, 46 yards
Valparaiso	Receiving	Gary Givens III	3 receptions, 71 yards, TD
Youngstown State	Passing	Beau Brungard	11/14, 125 yards, 2 TD
Youngstown State	Rushing	Beau Brungard	10 carries, 194 yards, 3 TD
Youngstown State	Receiving	Max Tomczak	4 receptions, 98 yards, 2 TD

=== Indiana Wesleyan (NAIA) ===
Game Three – Indiana Wesleyan Wildcats (NAIA) (1–0) vs Valparaiso Beacons (0–2) – Game summary

Quarter	1	2	3	4	Total
Wildcats (NAIA)	0	7	7	3	17
Beacons	7	10	0	3	20

at Brown Field • Valparaiso, IN

- Date: Saturday September 14, 2024
- Game time: 6:30 PM CDT
- Game weather: 0 °F (−18 °C)
- TV: ESPN+

Game information

First quarter
Second quarter
Third quarter
Fourth quarter

=== Drake ===
Game Six – Drake Bulldogs (2–1) at Valparaiso Beacons (3–2) – Game summary

Quarter	1	2	3	4	Total
Bulldogs	10	3	0	14	27
Beacons	0	0	3	0	3

at Brown Field • Valparaiso, IN

- Date: Saturday, October 5, 2024
- Game time: 12:00 PM CDT
- Game weather: 74 °F (23 °C)
- Game attendance: 2,577
- Referee: John Shay
- TV announcers (ESPN+): Todd Ickow (play-by-play) and Tom Byrne (analyst)

Game information

First quarter

- 10:31 Drake – Joe Frommelt recovered fumble in end zone (Shane Dunning kick) (Drake 7–0)
- 6:11 Drake – Mitchell January 5-yard pass from Blake Ellingson (Shane Dunning kick) (Drive: 6 plays, 69 yards, 3:09; Drake 14–0)

Second quarter

- 14:03 Drake – Shane Dunning 38-yard field goal (Drive: 8 plays, 40 yards, 3:24; Drake 17–0)

Third quarter

- 2:24 Valpo – Ryan Hawk 22-yard field goal (Drive: 9 plays, 33 yards, 3:48; Drake 17–3)

Fourth quarter

- 11:22 Drake – Shane Dunning 45-yard field goal (Drive: 10 plays, 47 yards, 5:28; Drake 20–3)
- 6:02 Drake – Dairon Cherwin 21-yard run (Shane Dunning kick) (Drive: 8 plays, 77 yards, 4:23; Drake 27–3)

Statistics	DRKE	VAL
First downs	17	10
Total yards	390	80
Rushing yards	128	–4
Passing yards	228	84
Passing: Comp–Att–Int	19–29–1	11–22–1
Time of possession	31:42	28:18

Team	Category	Player	Statistics
Drake	Passing	Luke Bailey	17/26, 224 yards, INT
Drake	Rushing	Davion Cherwin	10 carries, 72 yards, TD
Drake	Receiving	Sam Rodriguez	3 receptions, 65 yards
Valparaiso	Passing	Caron Tyler	11/21, 84 yards, INT
Valparaiso	Rushing	Ryan Mann	12 carries, 25 yards
Valparaiso	Receiving	Gary Givens III	2 receptions, 23 yards

=== Butler (Hoosier Helmet Trophy) ===
Game Ten – Butler Bulldogs (7–2) at Valparaiso Beacons (3–5) – Game summary

Quarter	1	2	3	4	Total
Bulldogs	7	10	0	7	24
Beacons	0	10	0	7	17

at Brown Field • Valparaiso, IN

- Date: Saturday November 9, 2024
- Game time: 2:00 p.m. EST
- Game weather: Cloudy • Temperature: 53 °F (12 °C) • Wind: SE at 10 miles per hour (16 km/h)
- Game attendance: 1,783
- Referee: Chris Rick
- TV: ESPN+

Game information

First quarter

- (3:02) BUT – Nick Howard 1-yard run, Ryan Short kick (Drive: 11 plays, 80 yards, 6:20; Butler 7–0)

Second quarter

- (14:07) BUT – Ryan Short 41-yard field goal (Drive: 6 plays, 43 yards, 1:43; Butler 10–0)
- (7:12) VAL – Gary Givens III 33-yard pass from Caron Tyler, Ryan Hawk kick (Drive: 4 plays, 43 yards, 2:15; Butler 10–7)
- (3:09) BUT – Reagan Andrew 1-yard run, Ryan Short kick (Drive: 7 plays, 78 yards, 3:57; Butler 17–7)
- (0:07) VAL – Ryan Hawk 27-yard field goal (Drive: 9 plays, 53 yards, 2:53; Butler 17–10)

Third quarter

No scoring plays

Fourth quarter

- (12:19) BUT – Joey Suchy 36-yard run, Ryan Short kick (Drive: 10 plays, 80 yards, 5:17; Butler 24–10)
- (7:19) VAL – Michael Mansaray 5-yard run, Ryan Hawk kick (Drive: 8 plays, 60 yards, 4:56; Butler 24–17)

Statistics	BUT	VAL
First downs	17	12
Total yards	384	263
Rushing yards	145	105
Passing yards	239	158
Passing: Comp–Att–Int	16–23–0	8–17–0
Time of possession	32:01	27:59

Team	Category	Player	Statistics
Butler	Passing	Reagan Andrew	15/22, 232 yards
Butler	Rushing	Nick Howard	13 carries, 50 yards, TD
Butler	Receiving	Luke Wooten	8 receptions, 138 yards
Valparaiso	Passing	Caron Tyler	8/16, 158 yards, TD
Valparaiso	Rushing	Michael Mansaray	23 carries, 82 yards, TD
Valparaiso	Receiving	Gary Givens III	3 receptions, 93 yards, TD
