= 2024 NCAA Division I FCS football season =

American college football season

2024 NCAA Division I FCS season

Regular season
- Number of teams: 129
- Duration: August 24 – December 7
- Payton Award: Montana State quarterback Tommy Mellott
- Buchanan Award: Central Arkansas defensive end David Walker

Playoff
- Duration: November 30 – December 21
- Championship date: January 6, 2025
- Championship site: Toyota Stadium, Frisco, Texas
- Champion: North Dakota State

NCAA Division I FCS football seasons
- «2023 2025»

The 2024 NCAA Division I FCS football season, part of college football in the United States, was organized by the National Collegiate Athletic Association (NCAA) at the Division I Football Championship Subdivision (FCS) level. The regular season began on August 24 and ended in November. The postseason began in November and, aside from any scheduled all-star games, ended on January 6, 2025 with the 2025 NCAA Division I Football Championship Game at Toyota Stadium in Frisco, Texas.

Due to the structure of the calendar in 2024, FCS teams were allowed to play 12 regular-season games instead of the usual 11.

== Conference changes and new programs ==
School	2023 conference	2024 conference	Ref
Bryant	Big South–OVC	CAA	
Kennesaw State	FCS Independent	CUSA (FBS)	
Mercyhurst	PSAC (D-II)	NEC	
Merrimack	NEC	FCS Independent	
Robert Morris	Big South–OVC	NEC	
Sacred Heart	NEC	FCS Independent	
Stephen F. Austin	UAC	Southland	
West Georgia	Gulf South (D-II)	UAC	
Western Illinois	MVFC	Big South–OVC	

== Notable headlines ==
- April 19 - The NCAA approved numerous technology rules such as teams having the option of using tablets to view in-game video for the 2024 season. Seven of the final eight playoff teams leveraged GameStrat's in-game video technology.
- April 25 – The NCAA approved an increase in the number of seeded teams in the FCS playoff bracket from 8 to 16, effective for the 2024 season. The number of qualifying teams and the bracket format will remain otherwise unchanged.
- May 29 – Stephen F. Austin announced it would leave the United Athletic Conference (UAC) on July 1 to rejoin the Southland Conference (SLC) after a three-year absence.
- August 27:
  - The oversight committees for FBS and FCS recommended that the transfer portal be open only for a 30-day period, starting on the Monday after conference championship games. This did not affect the previously existing exceptions for participants in postseason games, which allows players to enter the portal within a 5-day window after their team's final game, or players undergoing a coaching change. The Division I Council voted on the change in October.
  - Both oversight committees also approved a change to redshirt rules. Effective immediately, the participation limit of four games for redshirting players no longer includes postseason games. Relevant to FCS, this includes the SWAC championship game, the Celebration Bowl, and FCS playoff games.
- October 9:
  - The NCAA Division I Council approved the recommended reduction of the FBS and FCS transfer portal to 30 days, though with a different schedule than recommended. The fall window, which opens on the Monday after the FBS conference championship games, will be open only for 20 days. A 10-day spring portal will open in mid-April.
  - The council also abolished the National Letter of Intent program effective immediately. Written offers of athletics aid replaced the NLI.
  - The council introduced a proposal that would shorten the transition periods for schools wishing to reclassify from Division II or Division III to Division I. The council would approve this proposal at its January 2025 meeting, thereby reducing the transition periods for D-II and D-III schools by a year, respectively to three and four years.
- November 7 – Texas A&M University–Commerce announced a name change to East Texas A&M University, effective immediately.
- December 18 - The Ivy League announced starting in the 2025 season, the league champion would participate in the NCAA Division I Championship.

== Kickoff games ==
The regular season began on Saturday, August 24 with four games in Week 0:

Date	Visiting team	Home team	Site	Result	Attendance	Ref.
August 24	Southeast Missouri State	North Alabama	Cramton Bowl • Montgomery, Alabama (FCS Kickoff)	37–15	4,358	
August 24	Delaware State	Hawaii	Clarence T. C. Ching Athletics Complex • Honolulu, Hawaii	14–35	12,206	
August 24	No. 4 Montana State	New Mexico	University Stadium • Albuquerque, New Mexico	35–31	17,314	
August 24	Florida A&M	Norfolk State	Center Parc Stadium • Atlanta, Georgia (MEAC/SWAC Challenge)	24–23	22,210	
^{#}Rankings from STATS poll released prior to the game.

== Conference standings ==
2024 Big Sky Conference football standings
	Conf.			Overall
Team	W		L	W		L
No. 2 Montana State $^	8	–	0	15	–	1
No. 5 UC Davis ^	7	–	1	11	–	3
No. 7 Idaho ^	6	–	2	10	–	4
No. 22 Northern Arizona ^	6	–	2	8	–	5
No. 10 Montana ^	5	–	3	9	–	5
Idaho State	3	–	5	5	–	7
Eastern Washington	3	–	5	4	–	8
Weber State	3	–	5	4	–	8
Portland State	3	–	5	3	–	8
Cal Poly	2	–	6	3	–	8
Sacramento State	1	–	7	3	–	9
Northern Colorado	1	–	7	1	–	11
$ – Conference champion; ^ – FCS playoff participant; Rankings from STATS Poll

2024 Big South–OVC football standings
	Conf.			Overall
Team	W		L	W		L
No. 16 Southeast Missouri State +^	6	–	2	9	–	4
Tennessee Tech +	6	–	2	7	–	5
No. 17 UT Martin +^	6	–	2	9	–	5
No. 19 Tennessee State +^	6	–	2	9	–	4
Lindenwood*	4	–	4	5	–	7
Western Illinois	3	–	5	4	–	8
Gardner–Webb	3	–	5	4	–	8
Eastern Illinois	2	–	6	3	–	9
Charleston Southern	0	–	8	1	–	11
+ – Conference co-champions; ^ – FCS playoff participant; Note: Lindenwood ineligible for Big South–OVC title and FCS postseason play due to transition from NCAA Division II.; Rankings from STATS Poll

2024 Coastal Athletic Association Football Conference standings
	Conf.			Overall
Team	W		L	W		L
No. 15 Richmond +^	8	–	0	10	–	3
No. 9 Rhode Island* +^	7	–	1	11	–	3
No. 12 Villanova ^	6	–	2	10	–	4
Delaware*	6	–	2	9	–	2
No. 23 New Hampshire ^	6	–	2	8	–	5
Stony Brook	5	–	3	8	–	4
Towson	5	–	3	7	–	5
Elon	5	–	3	6	–	6
William & Mary	4	–	4	7	–	5
Monmouth	4	–	4	6	–	6
Maine	3	–	5	5	–	7
Albany	2	–	6	4	–	8
Hampton	2	–	6	5	–	7
Campbell	1	–	7	3	–	9
Bryant	0	–	8	2	–	10
North Carolina A&T	0	–	8	1	–	11
+ – Conference co-champions; ^ – FCS playoff participant; * Delaware ineligible for rankings and 2024 FCS playoffs due to transition to the FBS. Richmond and Rhode Island named co-champions as Rhode Island's only CAA loss was to Delaware.; Rankings from STATS Poll

2024 Ivy League football standings
	Conf.			Overall
Team	W		L	W		L
Dartmouth +	5	–	2	8	–	2
No. 25 Harvard +	5	–	2	8	–	2
Columbia +	5	–	2	7	–	3
Yale	4	–	3	7	–	3
Cornell	3	–	4	4	–	6
Penn	2	–	5	4	–	6
Brown	2	–	5	3	–	7
Princeton	2	–	5	3	–	7
+ – Conference co-champions; Rankings from STATS Poll

2024 Mid-Eastern Athletic Conference football standings
	Conf.			Overall
Team	W		L	W		L
No. 24 South Carolina State $	5	–	0	9	–	3
North Carolina Central	4	–	1	8	–	3
Morgan State	3	–	2	6	–	6
Norfolk State	2	–	3	4	–	8
Howard	1	–	4	4	–	8
Delaware State	0	–	5	1	–	11
$ – Conference champion; Rankings from STATS Poll

2024 Missouri Valley Football Conference standings
	Conf.			Overall
Team	W		L	W		L
No. 1 North Dakota State +^	7	–	1	14	–	2
No. 3 South Dakota State +^	7	–	1	12	–	3
No. 4 South Dakota +^	7	–	1	11	–	3
Missouri State *	6	–	2	8	–	4
No. 11 Illinois State ^	6	–	2	10	–	4
Youngstown State	3	–	5	4	–	8
Indiana State	3	–	5	4	–	8
North Dakota	2	–	6	5	–	7
Southern Illinois	2	–	6	4	–	8
Northern Iowa	1	–	7	3	–	9
Murray State	0	–	8	1	–	11
+ – Conference co-champions; ^ – FCS playoff participant; * – Ineligible for 2024 FCS playoffs due to transition to the FBS; Rankings from STATS Poll

2024 Northeast Conference football standings
	Conf.			Overall
Team	W		L	W		L
Central Connecticut +^	5	–	1	7	–	6
Duquesne +	5	–	1	8	–	3
Robert Morris	4	–	2	7	–	5
LIU	3	–	3	4	–	8
Wagner	2	–	4	4	–	8
Saint Francis (PA)	2	–	4	4	–	7
Mercyhurst*	0	–	0	4	–	7
Stonehill*	0	–	6	1	–	10
+ – Conference co-champions; ^ – FCS playoff participant; * – Stonehill and Mercyhurst are ineligible for NEC title and FCS postseason play due to transition from NCAA Division II.; Rankings from STATS Poll

2024 Patriot League football standings
	Conf.			Overall
Team	W		L	W		L
No. 20 Lehigh +^	5	–	1	9	–	4
Holy Cross +	5	–	1	6	–	6
Bucknell	4	–	2	6	–	6
Lafayette	2	–	4	6	–	6
Georgetown	2	–	4	5	–	6
Fordham	2	–	4	2	–	10
Colgate	1	–	5	2	–	10
+ – Conference co-champions; ^ – FCS playoff participant; Rankings from STATS Poll

2024 Pioneer Football League standings
	Conf.			Overall
Team	W		L	W		L
Drake $^	7	–	1	8	–	3
San Diego	6	–	2	8	–	3
Butler	5	–	3	9	–	3
Morehead State	5	–	3	7	–	5
St. Thomas (MN)*	5	–	3	6	–	6
Dayton	4	–	4	6	–	5
Davidson	4	–	4	6	–	5
Presbyterian	4	–	4	6	–	6
Valparaiso	2	–	5	4	–	7
Marist	1	–	7	1	–	10
Stetson	0	–	7	2	–	9
$ – Conference champion; ^ – FCS playoff participant; * – St. Thomas (MN) ineligible for FCS postseason play due to transition from NCAA Division III; Rankings from STATS Poll

2024 Southern Conference football standings
	Conf.			Overall
Team	W		L	W		L
No. 8 Mercer $^	7	–	1	11	–	3
Western Carolina	6	–	2	7	–	5
Chattanooga	5	–	3	7	–	5
East Tennessee State	5	–	3	7	–	5
Samford	3	–	4	4	–	7
The Citadel	3	–	5	5	–	7
Wofford	3	–	5	5	–	7
Furman	2	–	5	3	–	8
VMI	1	–	7	1	–	11
$ – Conference champion; ^ – FCS playoff participant; Rankings from STATS Poll

2024 Southland Conference football standings
	Conf.			Overall
Team	W		L	W		L
No. 6 Incarnate Word $^	7	–	0	11	–	3
Southeastern Louisiana	6	–	1	7	–	5
Stephen F. Austin	4	–	3	7	–	5
Lamar	4	–	3	7	–	5
McNeese	3	–	4	6	–	6
Houston Christian	3	–	4	5	–	7
East Texas A&M*	2	–	4	3	–	9
Nicholls	2	–	5	4	–	8
Northwestern State	0	–	7	0	–	12
$ – Conference champion; ^ – FCS playoff participant; * – East Texas A&M was ineligible for FCS postseason play due to transition from NCAA Division II.; Rankings from STATS Poll

2024 Southwestern Athletic Conference football standings
	Conf.			Overall
Team	W		L	W		L
East Division
No. 18 Jackson State xy$	8	–	1	12	–	2
Florida A&M	5	–	3	7	–	5
Alabama State	5	–	3	7	–	5
Alabama A&M	4	–	4	6	–	6
Bethune–Cookman	2	–	6	2	–	10
Mississippi Valley State	1	–	7	1	–	11
West Division
Southern xy	7	–	2	8	–	5
Alcorn State	5	–	3	6	–	6
Texas Southern	4	–	4	5	–	6
Prairie View A&M	3	–	5	5	–	7
Grambling State	2	–	6	5	–	7
Arkansas–Pine Bluff	2	–	6	3	–	9
Championship: Jackson State 41, Southern 13
$ – Conference champion; x – Division champion/co-champions; y – Championship game participant; Rankings from STATS Poll

2024 United Athletic Conference standings
	Conf.			Overall
Team	W		L	W		L
No. 14 Abilene Christian $^	7	–	1	9	–	5
No. 13 Tarleton State ^	6	–	2	10	–	4
No. 21 Eastern Kentucky ^	6	–	2	8	–	5
Southern Utah	6	–	2	7	–	5
Central Arkansas	3	–	5	6	–	6
Austin Peay	3	–	5	4	–	8
North Alabama	3	–	5	3	–	9
West Georgia*	1	–	7	4	–	7
Utah Tech	1	–	7	1	–	11
$ – Conference champion; ^ – FCS playoff participant; Note: West Georgia is ineligible for the UAC title and FCS postseason play due to transition from NCAA Division II.; Rankings from STATS Poll

2024 NCAA Division I FCS independents football standings
	Conf.			Overall
Team	W		L	W		L
Sacred Heart		–		5	–	6
Merrimack		–		5	–	6

== Playoff qualifiers ==
=== Automatic berths for conference champions ===
Conference	Team	Record	Appearance	Last bid	Result of last appearance
Big Sky Conference	Montana State	12–0 (8–0)	14th	2023	Lost to North Dakota State in second round
Big South–OVC	Southeast Missouri State	9–3 (6–2)	5th	2022	Lost to Montana in first round
CAA Football	Richmond	10–2 (8–0)	14th	2023	Lost to Albany in second round
Missouri Valley Football Conference	South Dakota State	10–2 (7–1)	14th	2023	Won National Championship against Montana
Northeast Conference	Central Connecticut	7–5 (5–1)	3rd	2019	Lost to Albany in first round
Patriot League	Lehigh	8–3 (5–1)	12th	2017	Lost to Stony Brook in first round
Pioneer Football League	Drake	8–2 (7–1)	2nd	2023	Lost to North Dakota State in first round
Southern Conference	Mercer	10–2 (7–1)	2nd	2023	Lost to South Dakota State in second round
Southland Conference	Incarnate Word	10–2 (7–0)	4th	2022	Lost to North Dakota State in semifinal
United Athletic Conference	Abilene Christian	8–4 (7–1)	1st	N/A	N/A

=== At-large qualifiers ===
Conference	Team	Record	Appearance	Last bid	Result of last appearance
Big Sky Conference	Idaho	9–3 (6–2)	14th	2023	Lost to Albany in quarterfinals
Big Sky Conference	UC Davis	10–2 (7–1)	3rd	2021	Lost to South Dakota State in first round
Big Sky Conference	Montana	8–4 (5–3)	29th	2023	Lost to South Dakota State in National Championship
Big Sky Conference	Northern Arizona	8–4 (6–2)	7th	2017	Lost to San Diego in first round
Big South–OVC	UT Martin	8–4 (6–2)	3rd	2021	Lost to Montana State in second round
Big South–OVC	Tennessee State	9–3 (6–2)	7th	2013	Lost to Eastern Illinois in second round
CAA Football	New Hampshire	8–4 (6–2)	18th	2022	Lost to Holy Cross in second round
CAA Football	Villanova	9–3 (6–2)	16th	2023	Lost to South Dakota State in quarterfinals
CAA Football	Rhode Island	10–2 (7–1)	4th	1985	Lost to Furman in quarterfinals
Missouri Valley Football Conference	North Dakota State	10–2 (7–1)	15th	2023	Lost to Montana in semifinal
Missouri Valley Football Conference	South Dakota	9–2 (7–1)	4th	2023	Lost to North Dakota State in quarterfinals
Missouri Valley Football Conference	Illinois State	9–3 (6–2)	9th	2019	Lost to North Dakota State in quarterfinals
United Athletic Conference	Tarleton State	9–3 (6–2)	1st	N/A	N/A
United Athletic Conference	Eastern Kentucky	8–4 (6–2)	22nd	2022	Lost to Gardner–Webb in second round

=== Abstentions ===
- Ivy League – Harvard
- Mid-Eastern Athletic Conference – South Carolina State
- Southwestern Athletic Conference – Jackson State

== Postseason ==
The FCS again features a 24-team postseason bracket: 10 teams decided via automatic bids issued to conference champions, and 14 at-large bids (see above). Where previously the top eight teams were seeded, the top 16 teams were seeded this year, a change from the 2023 season.

=== Bowl game ===
Date	Time	Visiting team	Home team	Site	Result	Attendance	Ref.
December 14	Noon	No. 18 Jackson State	No. 20 South Carolina State	Mercedes-Benz Stadium • Atlanta, Georgia (Celebration Bowl)	28–7	36,823	
^{#}Rankings from STATS poll released on November 25. All times are in Eastern time.

=== NCAA Division I playoff bracket ===
First Round; November 30; Campus sites USA: ESPN+, ESPN2; Canada: TSN+
16	New Hampshire	10
UT Martin	41
9	Richmond	16
Lehigh	20
12	Illinois State	35
Southeast Missouri State*	27
13	Tarleton State	43
Drake	29
14	Montana	41
Tennessee State	27
11	Villanova	22
Eastern Kentucky	17
10	Rhode Island	21
Central Connecticut	17
15	Abilene Christian	24
Northern Arizona	0

Second Round; December 7 Campus sites ESPN+
1	Montana State	49
UT Martin	17
8	Idaho	34
Lehigh	13
5	UC Davis	42
12	Illinois State	10
4	South Dakota	42
13	Tarleton State	31
3	South Dakota State	35
14	Montana	18
6	Incarnate Word	13
11	Villanova	6
7	Mercer	17
10	Rhode Island	10
2	North Dakota State	51
15	Abilene Christian	31

Quarterfinals; December 13/14; Campus sites USA: ABC, ESPN, ESPN+ Canada: TSN+
1	Montana State	52
8	Idaho	19
4	South Dakota	35
5	UC Davis	21
3	South Dakota State	55
6	Incarnate Word	14
2	North Dakota State	31
7	Mercer	7

Semifinals; December 21; Campus sites USA: ABC/ESPN+ Canada: TSN+
1	Montana State	31
4	South Dakota	17
3	South Dakota State	21
2	North Dakota State	28

National Championship; January 6; 7 p.m. EST; Toyota Stadium, Frisco, Texas; USA: ESPN/ESPN+ Canada: TSN2/TSN+
1	Montana State	32
2	North Dakota State	35

* Hosted despite being the unseeded team (Illinois State unable to host due to facilities conflicts)

== Rankings ==
The top 25 from the Stats Perform and AFCA Coaches Polls.

=== Pre-season polls ===
Stats Perform
Ranking	Team
1	South Dakota State (52)
2	North Dakota State (3)
3	Montana
4	Montana State (1)
5	South Dakota
6	Villanova
7	Idaho
8	Sacramento State
9	Chattanooga
10	Southern Illinois
11	Central Arkansas
12	Furman
13	Richmond
14	Incarnate Word
15	William & Mary
16	Albany
17	Lafayette
18	UC Davis
19	Illinois State
20	Western Carolina
21	Tarleton State
22	Weber State
23	Nicholls
24	North Dakota
25	Youngstown State

AFCA Coaches
Ranking	Team
1	South Dakota State (25)
2	North Dakota State
3	Montana
4	Montana State
5	South Dakota
6	Villanova
7	Idaho
8	Chattanooga
9	Furman
10	Sacramento State
11	Southern Illinois
12	Richmond
13	Central Arkansas
14	Albany
15	Incarnate Word
16	William & Mary
17	UC Davis
18	Lafayette
19	Western Carolina
20	Illinois State
21	Tarleton State
22	North Dakota
23	Youngstown State
24	Nicholls
25	Florida A&M (1)

STATS source:
AFCA source:

=== Final rankings ===
Stats Perform
Ranking	Team
1	North Dakota State (56)
2	Montana State
3	South Dakota State
4	South Dakota
5	UC Davis
6	Incarnate Word
7	Idaho
8	Mercer
9	Rhode Island
10	Montana
11	Illinois State
12	Villanova
13	Tarleton State
14	Abilene Christian
15	Richmond
16	Southeast Missouri State
17	UT Martin
18	Jackson State
19	Tennessee State
20	Lehigh
21	Eastern Kentucky
22	Northern Arizona
23	New Hampshire
24	South Carolina State
25	Harvard

AFCA Coaches
Ranking	Team
1	North Dakota State (16)
2	Montana State
3	South Dakota State
4	South Dakota
5	UC Davis
6	Incarnate Word
7	Mercer
8	Idaho
9	Villanova
10	Illinois State
11	Rhode Island
12	Tarleton State
13	Montana
14	Abilene Christian
15	Jackson State
16	Richmond
17	Southeast Missouri State
18	UT Martin
19	Tennessee State
20	South Carolina State
21	Lehigh
22	Northern Arizona
23	Missouri State
24	New Hampshire
25	Eastern Kentucky

STATS source: AFCA source:

== Top 10 matchups ==
=== Regular season matchups ===
Rankings reflect the STATS Perform poll.

Date	Visiting team	Home team	Site	Result	Attendance	Ref.
October 5	No. 7 North Dakota	No. 2 North Dakota State	Fargodome • Fargo, North Dakota (rivalry)	17–41	18,723	
October 12	No. 7 Idaho	No. 3 Montana State	Bobcat Stadium • Bozeman, Montana	7–38	21,907	
October 19	No. 1 South Dakota State	No. 2 North Dakota State	Fargodome • Fargo, North Dakota (Dakota Marker)	9–13	18,807	
October 26	No. 4 South Dakota	No. 3 South Dakota State	Dana J. Dykhouse Stadium • Brookings, South Dakota (South Dakota Showdown Series)	17–20 ^{OT}	19,351	
November 9	No. 4 UC Davis	No. 7 Montana	Washington–Grizzly Stadium • Missoula, Montana	30–14	26,012	
November 16	No. 2 Montana State	No. 4 UC Davis	UC Davis Health Stadium • Davis, California	30–28	13,947	
November 23	No. 1 North Dakota State	No. 4 South Dakota	DakotaDome • Vermillion, South Dakota (rivalry)	28–29	9,062	
November 23	No. 9 Montana	No. 2 Montana State	Bobcat Stadium • Bozeman, Montana (Brawl of the Wild)	11–34	22,057	
^{#}Rankings from STATS poll released prior to the game.

=== Postseason matchups ===
This section lists matchups between top-ten ranked teams during the postseason tournament. A team's seeding may differ from its ranking and it is indicated in parentheses.

Date	Visiting team	Home team	Site	Result	Attendance	Ref.
December 7	No. 10 (10) Rhode Island	No. 8 (7) Mercer	Five Star Stadium • Macon, Georgia (Second round)	10–17	8,012	
December 13	No. 7 (8) Idaho	No. 1 (1) Montana State	Bobcat Stadium • Bozeman, Montana (Quarterfinal)	19–52	18,127	
December 14	No. 6 (6) Incarnate Word	No. 2 (3) South Dakota State	Dana J. Dykhouse Stadium • Brookings, South Dakota (Quarterfinal)	14–55	8,640	
December 14	No. 8 (7) Mercer	No. 3 (2) North Dakota State	Fargodome • Fargo, North Dakota (Quarterfinal)	7–31	10,353	
December 14	No. 5 (5) UC Davis	No. 4 (4) South Dakota	DakotaDome • Vermillion, South Dakota (Quarterfinal)	21–35	6,135	
December 21	No. 4 (4) South Dakota	No. 1 (1) Montana State	Bobcat Stadium • Bozeman, Montana (Semifinal)	17–31	20,557	
December 21	No. 2 (3) South Dakota State	No. 3 (2) North Dakota State	Fargodome • Fargo, North Dakota (Dakota Marker, semifinal)	21–28	17,849	
January 6, 2025	No. 3 (2) North Dakota State	No. 1 (1) Montana State	Toyota Stadium • Frisco, Texas (National championship)	35–32	18,005	
^{#}Rankings from STATS poll released on November 25.

== Upsets ==
This section lists instances of unranked teams defeating STATS poll-ranked teams during the season.

=== Regular season ===
During the regular season, thirty-four unranked teams defeated ranked teams.

Date	Visiting team	Home team	Site	Result	Attendance	Ref.
September 7	Wofford	No. 14 Richmond	E. Claiborne Robins Stadium • Richmond, Virginia	26–19	5,382	
September 7	Charleston Southern	No. 15 Furman	Paladin Stadium • Greenville, South Carolina	24–20	8,377	
September 7	Campbell	No. 17 Western Carolina	E. J. Whitmire Stadium • Cullowhee, North Carolina	24–16	12,506	
September 14	No. 20 Weber State	Lamar	Provost Umphrey Stadium • Beaumont, Texas	16–17	5,981	
September 14	Duquesne	No. 21 Youngstown State	Stambaugh Stadium • Youngstown, Ohio	28–25	12,415	
September 14	Western Carolina	No. 22 Elon	Rhodes Stadium • Elon, North Carolina	24–17	5,104	
September 21	No. 18 Lafayette	Columbia	Wien Stadium • New York City, New York	20–31	3,592	
September 28	No. 10 Sacramento State	Northern Arizona	Walkup Skydome • Flagstaff, Arizona	16–34	9,232	
September 28	Maine	No. 21 Albany	Bob Ford Field • Albany, New York	34–20	8,019	
September 28	McNeese	No. 25 Weber State	Stewart Stadium • Ogden, Utah	28–26	8,941	
October 4	No. 21 New Hampshire	Harvard	Harvard Stadium • Boston, Massachusetts	23–28	8,676	
October 5	Weber State	No. 8 Montana	Washington–Grizzly Stadium • Missoula, Montana	55–48 ^{OT}	25,888	
October 5	No. 12 William & Mary	Towson	Johnny Unitas Stadium • Towson, Maryland	27–34	6,165	
October 5	No. 22 McNeese	Houston Christian	Husky Stadium • Houston, Texas	22–43	2,232	
October 5	Chattanooga	No. 23 East Tennessee State	William B. Greene Jr. Stadium • Johnson City, Tennessee (Rail Rivalry)	17–10	10,534	
October 12	No. 10 Abilene Christian	North Alabama	Braly Municipal Stadium • Florence, Alabama	34–47	9,918	
October 12	Missouri State	No. 16 Illinois State	Hancock Stadium • Normal, Illinois	41–7	6,232	
October 12	Eastern Washington	No. 18 Sacramento State	Hornet Stadium • Sacramento, California	35–28	14,916	
October 12	Northern Colorado	No. 20 Weber State	Stewart Stadium • Ogden, Utah	21–17	10,345	
October 12	Stephen F. Austin	No. 22 Lamar	Provost Umphrey Stadium • Beaumont, Texas	27–20	8,368	
October 19	No. 5 Villanova	Maine	Alfond Sports Stadium • Orono, Maine	7–35	6,860	
October 19	No. 7 Mercer	Samford	Pete Hanna Stadium • Homewood, Alabama	35–55	4,216	
October 19	No. 25т Florida A&M	Jackson State	Mississippi Veterans Memorial Stadium • Jackson, Mississippi	21–35	28,450	
October 26	No. 7 North Dakota	Youngstown State	Stambaugh Stadium • Youngstown, Ohio	40–41 ^{OT}	9,979	
October 26	No. 16 William & Mary	Stony Brook	Kenneth P. LaValle Stadium • Stony Brook, New York	13–35	7,599	
October 31	No. 19 North Carolina Central	South Carolina State	Oliver C. Dawson Stadium • Orangeburg, South Carolina	21–24	11,169	
November 2	No. 11 Central Arkansas	Utah Tech	Greater Zion Stadium • St. George, Utah	21–34	2,526	
November 2	Eastern Kentucky	No. 7 Tarleton State	Memorial Stadium • Stephenville, Texas	17–13	15,281	
November 2	No. 15 North Dakota	Indiana State	Memorial Stadium • Terre Haute, Indiana	31–35	3,013	
November 2	No. 18 Chattanooga	Western Carolina	E. J. Whitmire Stadium • Cullowhee, North Carolina	34–38	11,198	
November 2	Harvard	No. 22 Dartmouth	Memorial Field • Hanover, New Hampshire (rivalry)	31–27	7,711	
November 2	UT Martin	No. 25 Tennessee State	Nissan Stadium • Nashville, Tennessee (Sgt. York Trophy)	28–21	2,845	
November 9	No. 6 Southeast Missouri State	Lindenwood	Harlen C. Hunter Stadium • St. Charles, Missouri (Game Ball Brawl Trophy)	12–24	5,108	
November 9	No. 11 Rhode Island	Delaware	Delaware Stadium • Newark, Delaware	21–24	17,326	
November 9	No. 16 Central Arkansas	Eastern Kentucky	Roy Kidd Stadium • Richmond, Kentucky	24–31	7,902	
November 9	Elon	No. 20 William & Mary	Zable Stadium • Williamsburg, Virginia	40–36	8,131	
November 9	No. 22 Western Carolina	East Tennessee State	William B. Greene Jr. Stadium • Johnson City, Tennessee	21–24	12,109	
November 16	No. 9 Villanova	Monmouth	Kessler Field • West Long Branch, New Jersey	33–40	2,856	
November 16	No. 16 Stony Brook	New Hampshire	Wildcat Stadium • Durham, New Hampshire	30–31	4,760	
November 16	Tennessee Tech	No. 18 UT Martin	Graham Stadium • Martin, Tennessee (Sgt. York Trophy)	10–9	2,914	
November 16	Samford	No. 19 Chattanooga	Finley Stadium • Chattanooga, Tennessee	36–13	7,691	
November 16	Furman	No. 21 East Tennessee State	William B. Greene Jr. Stadium • Johnson City, Tennessee	24–21	8,436	
November 16	Southern Utah	No. 24 Central Arkansas	Estes Stadium • Conway, Arkansas	38–31	4,024	
November 23	No. 11 Abilene Christian	Stephen F. Austin	Homer Bryce Stadium • Nacogdoches, Texas	19–32	4,208	
November 23	No. 12 Southeast Missouri State	Tennessee State	Nissan Stadium • Nashville, Tennessee	21–28	1,536	
November 23	Yale	No. 17 Harvard	Harvard Stadium • Boston, Massachusetts (The Game)	34–29	27,105	
November 23	Monmouth	No. 18 Stony Brook	Kenneth P. LaValle Stadium • Stony Brook, New York	55–47	5,263	
November 23	No. 19 Duquesne	Central Connecticut	Arute Field • New Britain, Connecticut	21–24	3,707	
^{#}Rankings from STATS poll released prior to the game.

=== Postseason upsets ===
This section lists unseeded teams defeating seeded teams during the playoffs. Seed rankings appears in parentheses.

Date	Visiting team	Home team	Site	Result	Attendance	Ref.
November 30	No. 23 UT Martin	No. 19 (16) New Hampshire	Wildcat Stadium • Durham, New Hampshire (First round)	41–10	1,573	
December 30	Lehigh	No. 9 (9) Richmond	E. Claiborne Robins Stadium • Richmond, Virginia (First round)	20–16	3,220	
^{#}Rankings from STATS poll on November 25.

== FCS team wins over FBS teams ==
Italics denotes FBS teams.

Date	Visiting team	Home team	Site	Result	Attendance	Ref.
August 24	No. 4 Montana State	New Mexico	University Stadium • Albuquerque, New Mexico	35–31 (Note: Montana State was a 13.5-point favorite at kickoff.)	17,314	
September 7	Saint Francis (PA)	Kent State	Dix Stadium • Kent, Ohio	23–17	11,585	
September 7	No. 7 Idaho	Wyoming	War Memorial Stadium • Laramie, Wyoming	17–13	25,070	
September 7	Southern Utah	UTEP	Sun Bowl • El Paso, Texas	27–24 ^{OT}	41,609	
September 21	Monmouth	FIU	Pitbull Stadium • Miami, Florida	45–42	17,922	
September 28	UT Martin	Kennesaw State	Fifth Third Stadium • Kennesaw, Georgia	24–13	10,847	
^{#}Rankings from STATS poll released prior to the game.

== Coaching changes ==
=== Preseason and in-season ===
This is restricted to coaching changes that took place on or after May 1, 2024, and will include any changes announced after a team's last regularly scheduled games but before its playoff games. For coaching changes that occurred earlier in 2024, see 2023 NCAA Division I FCS end-of-season coaching changes.

School	Outgoing coach	Date	Reason	Replacement

=== End of season ===
This list includes coaching changes announced during the season that did not take effect until the end of the season.

School	Outgoing coach	Date	Reason	Replacement	Previous position
Northern Iowa	Mark Farley	November 10, 2024	Retired	Todd Stepsis	Drake head coach (2019–2024)
Valparaiso	Landon Fox	November 24, 2024	Contract not renewed	Andy Waddle	Marietta head coach (2013–2024)
Prairie View A&M	Bubba McDowell	November 24, 2024	Fired	Tremaine Jackson	Valdosta State head coach (2022–2024)
McNeese	Gary Goff	November 25, 2024	Contract not renewed	Matt Viator	Louisiana senior defensive analyst (2021–2024)
Davidson	Scott Abell	November 26, 2024	Hired by Rice	Saj Thakkar	Bentley head coach (2023–2024)
Norfolk State	Dawson Odums	November 26, 2024	Fired	Michael Vick	Atlanta Legends advisor (2019)
North Dakota	Bubba Schweigert	November 30, 2024	Resigned	Eric Schmidt	San Diego State defensive coordinator and linebackers coach (2024)
Nicholls	Tim Rebowe	December 1, 2024	Retired	Tommy Rybacki	Nicholls defensive coordinator (2015–2024)
Colgate	Stan Dakosty	December 2, 2024	Fired	Curt Fitzpatrick	Cortland head coach (2020–2024)
Alabama A&M	Connell Maynor	December 2, 2024	Fired	Sam Shade	Miles head coach (2022–2024)
Drake	Todd Stepsis	December 3, 2024	Hired by Northern Iowa	Joe Woodley	Grand View head coach (2019–2024)
Delaware State	Lee Hull	December 3, 2024	Fired	DeSean Jackson	Woodrow Wilson (HS) (CA) offensive coordinator (2024)
Stetson	Brian Young	December 3, 2024	Resigned	Michael Jasper	Bethel (TN) head coach (2019–2024)
Butler	Mike Uremovich	December 4, 2024	Hired by Ball State	Kevin Lynch	Ball State assistant head coach and quarterbacks coach (2021–2024)
North Carolina A&T	Vincent Brown	December 4, 2024	Fired	Shawn Gibbs	Fort Valley State head coach (2022–2024)
Mississippi Valley State	Kendrick Wade	December 4, 2024	Fired	Terrell Buckley	Orlando Guardians head coach (2023)
Sacramento State	Andy Thompson	December 6, 2024	Resigned	Brennan Marion	UNLV offensive coordinator and quarterbacks coach (2023–2024)
East Tennessee State	Tre Lamb	December 8, 2024	Hired by Tulsa	Will Healy	Georgia State running backs coach (2024)
Idaho	Jason Eck	December 14, 2024	Hired by New Mexico	Thomas Ford	Oregon State running backs coach (2024)
South Dakota State	Jimmy Rogers	December 28, 2024	Hired by Washington State	Dan Jackson	Idaho defensive coordinator (2024)
South Dakota	Bob Nielson	January 16, 2025	Retired	Travis Johansen	South Dakota associate head coach and defensive coordinator (2022–2024)
Albany	Greg Gattuso	February 5, 2025	Hired as assistant coach by Penn State	Jared Ambrose (interim)	Albany assistant head coach, offensive coordinator, and quarterbacks coach (2022–2024)
Tennessee State	Eddie George	March 9, 2025	Hired by Bowling Green	Reggie Barlow	DC Defenders head coach (2023–2024)

== See also ==
- 2024 NCAA Division I FBS football season
- 2024 NCAA Division II football season
- 2024 NCAA Division III football season
- 2024 NAIA football season
- 2024 U Sports football season
