= 2024 Sacred Heart Pioneers football team =

American college football season

2024 Sacred Heart Pioneers football
- Conference: Independent
- Record: 5–6
- Head coach: Mark Nofri (13th season)
- Offensive coordinator: Matt Gardner (8th season)
- Defensive coordinator: Darin Edwards (1st season)
- Home stadium: Campus Field

2024 NCAA Division I FCS independents football standings
	Conf.			Overall
Team	W		L	W		L
Sacred Heart		–		5	–	6
Merrimack		–		5	–	6

The 2024 Sacred Heart Pioneers football team represented Sacred Heart University as an independent during the 2024 NCAA Division I FCS football season. Led by 13th-year head coach Mark Nofri, the Pioneers compiled a record of 5–6. Sacred Heart played home games at Campus Field in Fairfield, Connecticut.

== Schedule ==
Date	Time	Opponent	Site	TV	Result	Attendance
August 31	6:00 p.m.	Delaware State	Campus Field; Fairfield, CT	ESPN+	L 15–17	4,271
September 7	1:00 p.m.	Saint Anselm	Campus Field; Fairfield, CT	ESPN+	W 10–3	2,934
September 14	1:00 p.m.	Georgetown^{†}	Campus Field; Fairfield, CT	ESPN+	W 40–14	4,869
September 21	1:00 pm	at Stonehill	W.B. Mason Stadium; North Easton, MA	NEC Front Row	L 21–35	2,400
September 28	3:30 p.m.	at Delaware	Delaware Stadium; Newark, DE	FloFootball	L 0–49	19,054
October 5	1:00 p.m.	Norfolk State	Campus Field; Fairfield, CT	SNY	W 10–3	8,353
October 12	1:00 p.m.	at Howard	William H. Greene Stadium; Washington, DC	ESPN+	L 14–21	3,861
October 19	12:30 p.m.	at Lafayette	Fisher Stadium; Easton, PA	ESPN+	L 17–31	3,217
October 26	12:00 p.m.	Mercyhurst	Campus Field; Fairfield, CT	SNY	W 31–14	2,645
November 9	12:00 p.m.	LIU	Campus Field; Fairfield, CT	SNY	L 7–28	3,136
November 16	12:00 p.m.	at Merrimack	Duane Stadium; North Andover, MA	NESN+/ESPN+	W 31–20	2,896
^{†}Homecoming; All times are in Eastern time

== Game summaries ==
=== vs. Delaware State ===
Game One – Delaware State Hornets (0–1) vs Sacred Heart Pioneers (0–0) – Game summary

Quarter	1	2	3	4	Total
Hornets	0	7	0	10	17
Pioneers	3	3	3	6	15

at Campus Field, Fairfield, Connecticut

- Date: Saturday August 31, 2024
- Game time: 6:00 PM
- Game weather: Cloudy • Temperature: 78 °F (26 °C) • Wind: N 8 mph
- Game attendance: 4,271
- Referee: Travis Barta
- TV announcers (ESPN+): Randy Brochu (play-by-play), Freddie Coleman (analyst) and Morgan Alston (sideline)

Game information

First quarter

- (08:05) SHU - Matt Kling 34-yd field goal (Drive: 12 plays, 58 yards, 06:50; 3-0 Sacred Heart)

Second quarter

- (06:43) DSU - Kristian Tate 41-yd pass from Marqui Adams (Nathan Wilson kick) (Drive: 8 plays, 78 yards, 04:13; 7-3 Delaware State)
- (01:41) SHU - Matt Kling 41-yd field goal (Drive: 11 plays, 54 yards, 04:56; 7-6 Delaware State)

Third quarter

- (05:02) SHU - Matt Kling 30-yd field goal (Drive: 12 plays, 67 yards, 04:37; 9-7 Sacred Heart)

Fourth quarter

- (12:03) DSU - Nathan Wilson 29-yd field goal (Drive: 12 plays, 63 yards, 07:59; 10-9 Delaware State)
- (07:20) DSU - Jaden Sutton 39-yd run (Nathan Wilson kick), (Drive: 5 plays, 69 yards, 02:12; 17-9 Delaware State)
- (01:54) SHU - Xavier Leigh 4-yd run (2-pt no good ), (Drive: 10 plays, 66 yards, 05:21 17-15 Delaware State)

Statistics	DSU	SHU
First downs	15	20
Total yards	55-295	66-341
Rushing yards	33-145	43-237
Passing yards	150	104
Passing: Comp–Att–Int	14-22-0	12-23-2
Time of possession	28:11	31:49

Team	Category	Player	Statistics
Delaware State	Passing	Marqui Adams	14/22, 150 yards, TD
Delaware State	Rushing	Jaden Sutton	13 carries, 86 yards, TD
Delaware State	Receiving	Kristian Tate	2 receptions, 43 yards, TD
Sacred Heart	Passing	John Michalski	12/23, 104 yards, 2 INTs
Sacred Heart	Rushing	Xavier Leigh	14 carries, 91 yards, TD
Sacred Heart	Receiving	Ethan Hilliman	9 receptions, 75 yards

=== vs. Saint Anselm (DII) ===
Game Two – Saint Anselm Hawks (DII) (0–0) vs Sacred Heart Pioneers (0–1) – Game summary

Quarter	1	2	3	4	Total
Hawks (DII)	0	0	0	3	3
Pioneers	0	10	0	0	10

at Campus Field, Fairfield, Connecticut

- Date: Saturday September 7, 2024
- Game time: 1:00 PM
- Game weather: Cloudy • Temperature: 71 °F (22 °C) • Wind: NW 11 mph
- Game attendance: 2,934
- Referee: Michael Davis
- TV: ESPN+

Game information

First quarter

- No scoring

Second quarter

- (1:00) SHU – Matt King 29-yard field goal (Drive: 14 plays, 68 yards, 7:15; Sacred Heart 3–0)
- (0:00) SHU – Xavier Leigh 3-yard run, Matt Kling kick (Drive: 1 play, 3 yards, 0:04; Sacred Heart 10–0)

Third quarter

- No scoring

Fourth quarter

- (14:32) STA – Patrick Carroll 42-yard field goal (Drive: 12 plays, 64 yards, 5:33; Sacred Heart 10–3)

Statistics	STA	SHU
First downs	9	14
Total yards	87	232
Rushing yards	18	146
Passing yards	69	86
Passing: Comp–Att–Int	12–19–0	10–16–0
Time of possession	27:04	32:56

Team	Category	Player	Statistics
Saint Anselm	Passing	Anthony Santino	12/19, 69 yards
Saint Anselm	Rushing	Anthony Almeida	7 carries, 36 yards
Saint Anselm	Receiving	Patrick Yesinko	2 receptions, 20 yards
Sacred Heart	Passing	John Michalski	10/16, 86 yards
Sacred Heart	Rushing	John Michalski	17 carries, 71 yards
Sacred Heart	Receiving	Mason Stahl	2 receptions, 36 yards

=== vs. Georgetown ===
Game Three – Georgetown Hoyas (2–0) vs Sacred Heart Pioneers (1–1) – Game summary

Quarter	1	2	3	4	Total
Hoyas	7	7	0	0	14
Pioneers	13	10	7	10	40

at Campus Field, Fairfield, Connecticut

- Date: Saturday September 14, 2024
- Game time: 1:00 PM
- Game weather: Sunny • Temperature: 79 °F (26 °C) • Wind: W 8 mph
- Game attendance: 4,869
- Referee: Lance Carlen
- TV: ESPN+

Game information

First quarter

- SHU – John Michalski 9 Yd Run (Matt Kling PAT failed), 11:28. Pioneers 6–0. Drive: 6 plays, 37 yards, 2:19.
- GTWN – Naieem Kearney 1 Yd Run (Patrick Ryan Kick), 7:35. Hoyas 7–6. Drive: 9 plays, 70 yards, 3:53.
- SHU – Logan Lyson 6 Yd pass from John Michalski (Matt Kling Kick), 3:55. Pioneers 13–7. Drive: 8 plays, 63 yards, 3:33.

Second quarter

- GTWN – Jimmy Kibble 6 Yd pass from Danny Lauter (Patrick Ryan Kick), 14:55. Hoyas 14–13. Drive: 9 plays, 56 yards, 3:54.
- SHU – Ethan Hilliman 7 Yd pass from John Michalski (Matt Kling Kick), 0:32. Pioneers 20–14. Drive: 4 plays, 67 yards, 0:39.
- SHU – Matt Kling 21 Yd Field Goal, 0:00. Pioneers 23–14. Drive: 3 plays, 21 yards, 0:15.

Third quarter

- SHU – Xavier Leigh 37 Yd Run (Matt Kling Kick), 7:39. Pioneers 30–14. Drive: 8 plays, 80 yards, 3:57.

Fourth quarter

- SHU – Matt Kling 28 Yd Field Goal, 11:33. Pioneers 33–14. Drive: 5 plays, 42 yards, 2:09.
- SHU – Jalen Madison 2 Yd Run (Matt Kling Kick), 8:38. Pioneers 40–14. Drive: 2 plays, 81 yards, 0:32.

Statistics	GTWN	SHU
First downs	17	19
Total yards	352	473
Rushing yards	139	264
Passing yards	213	209
Passing: Comp–Att–Int	24−40−2	16−25−0
Time of possession	29:42	30:18

Team	Category	Player	Statistics
Georgetown	Passing	Danny Lauter	21/34, 190 yards, 1 TD, 2 INTs
Georgetown	Rushing	Naieem Kearney	17 carries, 98 yards, 1 TD
Georgetown	Receiving	Cam Pygatt	4 receptions, 74 yards
Sacred Heart	Passing	John Michalski	16/25, 209 yards, 2 TDs
Sacred Heart	Rushing	Xavier Leigh	12 carries, 112 yards, 1 TD
Sacred Heart	Receiving	Ethan Hilliman	4 receptions, 71 yards, 1 TD

=== at Stonehill ===
Game Four – Sacred Heart Pioneers (2–1) vs Stonehill Skyhawks (0–2) – Game summary

Quarter	1	2	3	4	Total
Pioneers	0	7	7	7	21
Skyhawks	14	14	0	7	35

at W.B. Mason Stadium • Easton, Massachusetts

- Date: Saturday September 21, 2024
- Game time: 1:00 p.m.
- Game weather: Rainy • Temperature: 58 °F (14 °C) • Wind: NE 10 mph
- Game attendance: 2400
- Referee: Michael Davis
- TV: NEC Front Row

Game information

First quarter

- (12:41) STO - Jarel Washington 26-yd run (Danny Hurley kick), (Drive: 6 plays, 75 yards, 02:19; 7-0 Stonehill)
- (04:17) STO - Chase Miller 7-yd pass from Ashur Carraha (Danny Hurley kick), (Drive: 12 plays, 80 yards, 06:18; 14-0 Stonehill)

Second quarter

- (08:57) SHU - Jalen Madison 23 yd run (Matt Kling kick), (Drive: 9 plays, 76 yards, 04:48; 14-7 Stonehill)
- (08:39) STO - Jarel Washington 72 yd run (Danny Hurley kick), (Drive: 1 plays, 72 yards, 00:12; 21-7 Stonehill)
- (00:54) STO - Cody Ruff 5 yd pass from Ashur Carraha (Danny Hurley kick), (Drive: 10 plays, 48 yards, 05:53; 28-7 Stonehill)

Third quarter

- (02:54) SHU - John Michalski 2 yd run (Matt Kling kick), (Drive: 5 plays, 40 yards, 01:47; 28-14 Stonehill)

Fourth quarter

- (01:44) SHU - Ethan Hilliman 17 yd pass from John Michalski (Matt Kling kick), (Drive: 9 plays, 73 yards, 02:29; 28-21 Stonehill)
- (00:38) STO - Zavion Woodard 31 yd run (Danny Hurley kick), (Drive: 3 plays, 38 yards, 01:06; 35-21 Stonehill)

Statistics	SHU	STO
First downs	17	20
Total yards	318	418
Rushing yards	175	354
Passing yards	143	64
Passing: Comp–Att–Int	16-29-0	7/10-0
Time of possession	26:55	33:05

Team	Category	Player	Statistics
Sacred Heart	Passing	John Michalski	16/28, 143 yards, 1 TD
Sacred Heart	Rushing	Jalen Madison	20 carries, 110 yards, 1 TD
Sacred Heart	Receiving	Kevin McGuire	3 receptions, 41 yards
Stonehill	Passing	Ashur Carraha	7/10, 64 yards, 2TDs
Stonehill	Rushing	Jarel Washington	23 carries, 184 yards, 2 TDs
Stonehill	Receiving	Cody Ruff	3 receptions, 30 yards, 1 TD

=== at Delaware ===
Game Five – Sacred Heart Pioneers (2–2) vs Delaware Fightin' Blue Hens (3–0) – Game summary

Quarter	1	2	3	4	Total
Pioneers	0	0	0	0	0
Fightin' Blue Hens	14	21	14	0	49

at Delaware Stadium • Newark, Delaware

- Date: Saturday September 28, 2024
- Game time: 3:30 p.m.
- Game weather: Cloudy • Temperature: 70 °F (21 °C) • Wind: NE 11 mph
- Game attendance: 19,504
- Referee: Eric Lewis
- TV: FloFootball

Game information

First quarter

- (04:13) DEL - Phil Lutz 45 yd pass from Zach Marker (Nate Reed kick), (Drive: 8 plays, 88 yards, 02:56; 7-0 Delaware)
- (02:44) DEL - Ethan Saunders 20 yd fumble recovery (Nate Reed kick), (14-0 Delaware)

Second quarter

- (11:49) DEL - Saeed St. Fleur 4 yd run (Nate Reed kick), (Drive: 10 plays, 45 yards, 04:08; 21-0 Delaware)
- (06:36) DEL - Caleb Fauria 7 yd pass from Zach Marker (Nate Reed kick), (Drive: 9 plays, 44 yards, 03:25; 28-0 Delaware)
- (01:57) DEL - Quincy Watson 4 yd run (Nate Reed kick), (Drive: 9 plays, 38 yards, 03:13; 35-0 Delaware)

Third quarter

- (08:35) DEL - Sean Wilson 4 yd pass from Zach Marker (Nate Reed kick), (Drive: 8 plays, 58 yards, 04:09; 42-0 Delaware)
- (02:07) DEL - Sean Wilson 27 yd pass from Braden Streeter (Skyler Sholder kick), (Drive: 1 plays, 27 yards, 00:08; 49-0 Delaware)

Fourth quarter

- no scoring

Statistics	SHU	DEL
First downs	11	23
Total yards	129	414
Rushing yards	51	175
Passing yards	78	239
Turnovers	2	1
Time of possession	26:44	33:16

Team	Category	Player	Statistics
Sacred Heart	Passing	John Michalski	14/22, 78 yards, INT
Sacred Heart	Rushing	Jalen Madison	10 rushes, 30 yards
Sacred Heart	Receiving	Kevin McGuire	3 receptions, 24 yards
Delaware	Passing	Zach Marker	17/27, 183 yards, 3 TDs
Delaware	Rushing	Jo'Nathan Silver	11 rushes, 53 yards
Delaware	Receiving	Phil Lutz	2 receptions, 62 yards, TD

=== vs. Norfolk State ===
Game Six – Norfolk State Spartans (2–4) vs Sacred Heart Pioneers (2–3) – Game summary

Quarter	1	2	3	4	Total
Spartans	0	0	3	0	3
Pioneers	3	7	0	0	10

at Campus Field, Fairfield, Connecticut

- Date: Saturday October 5, 2024
- Game time: 1:00 PM
- Game weather: Sunny • Temperature: 75 °F (24 °C) • Wind: N 15 mph
- Game attendance: 8353
- Referee: Michael Quinn
- TV: SNY

Game information

First quarter

- (01:43) SHU - Matt Kling 36 yd field goal, (Drive 11 plays, 30 yards, 04:51; 3-0 Sacred Heart)

Second quarter

- (02:08) SHU - John Michalski 4 yd run (Matt Kling kick), (Drive 10 plays, 80 yards, 04:58; 10-0 Sacred Heart)

Third quarter

- (08:07) FSU - Grandin Willcox 42 yd field goal, (Drive 5 plays, 55 yards, 01:57; 10-3 Sacred Heart)

Fourth quarter

- no scoring

Statistics	NORF	SHU
First downs	10	16
Total yards	319	243
Rushing yards	283	184
Passing yards	36	59
Passing: Comp–Att–Int	5-17-1	10-21-0
Time of possession	26:10	33:50

Team	Category	Player	Statistics
Norfolk State	Passing	Vinson Berry	5/11, 36 yards
Norfolk State	Rushing	X'Zavion Evans	22 carries, 166 yards
Norfolk State	Receiving	Kam'Ryn Thomas	2 receptions 14 yards
Sacred Heart	Passing	John Michalski	10/21, 59 yards
Sacred Heart	Rushing	Jalen Madison	17 carries, 94 yards
Sacred Heart	Receiving	Payton Rhoades	3 receptions, 21 yards

=== at Howard ===
Game Seven – Sacred Heart Pioneers (3–3) at Howard Bison (2–3) – Game summary

Quarter	1	2	3	4	Total
Pioneers	0	14	0	0	14
Bison	0	7	7	7	21

at William H. Greene Stadium • Washington, D.C.

- Date: Saturday October 12, 2024
- Game time: 1:00 p.m.
- Game weather: Sunny • Temperature: 74 °F (23 °C) • Wind: NW at 8 miles per hour (13 km/h)
- Game attendance: 3,861
- Referee: Toby Johnson
- TV announcers (ESPN+): Lynnell Willingham (play-by-play) and Melissa Kim (color analyst)

Game information

First quarter

No scoring plays

Second quarter

- (12:26) SHU – Xavier Leigh 67-yard run, Matt Kling kick (Drive: 2 plays, 82 yards, 0:56; Sacred Heart 7–0)
- (8:03) HOW – Jarrett Hunter 3-yard run, Dylan West kick (Drive: 10 plays, 68 yards, 4:14; Tied 7–7)
- (0:34) SHU – Jalen Madison 2-yard run, Matt Kling kick (Drive: 14 plays, 63 yards, 7:20; Sacred Heart 14–7)

Third quarter

- (14:11) HOW – Kasey Hawthorne 5-yard run, Dylan West kick (Drive: 1 play, 5 yards, 0:03; Tied 14–14)

Fourth quarter

- (6:04) HOW – Ja'Shawn Scroggins 5-yard run, Dylan West kick (Drive: 8 plays, 45 yards, 4:07; Howard 21–14)

Statistics	SHU	HOW
First downs	13	18
Total yards	268	339
Rushing yards	169	186
Passing yards	99	153
Passing: Comp–Att–Int	11–19–0	17–29–1
Time of possession	30:20	29:40

Team	Category	Player	Statistics
Sacred Heart	Passing	John Michalski	7/13, 82 yards
Sacred Heart	Rushing	Xavier Leigh	5 carries, 76 yards, TD
Sacred Heart	Receiving	Elijah Ford	3 receptions, 47 yards
Howard	Passing	Ja'Shawn Scroggins	17/29, 153 yards, INT
Howard	Rushing	Ja'Shawn Scroggins	12 carries, 85 yards, TD
Howard	Receiving	Kasey Hawthorne	5 receptions, 53 yards

=== at Lafayette ===
Game Eight – Sacred Heart Pioneers (3–4) at Lafayette Leopards (3–3) – Game summary

Quarter	1	2	3	4	Total
Pioneers	7	7	3	0	17
Leopards	14	10	0	7	31

at Fisher Stadium • Easton, Pennsylvania

- Date: Saturday October 19, 2024
- Game time: 12:30 PM
- Game weather: Sunny • Temperature: 65 °F (18 °C) • Wind: S 3mph
- Game attendance: 3,217
- Referee: Anthony Florio
- TV: ESPN+

Game information

First quarter

- (08:44) LAF - Jamar Curtis 1 yd run (Jack Simonetta kick), (Drive 12 plays, 70 yards, 05:01; 7-0 Lafayette)
- (04:50) SHU - Jalen Madison 6 yd run (Matt Kling kick), (Drive 8 plays, 86 yards, 03:54; 7-7 Tied
- (00:54) LAF - Troy Bruce 5 yd run (Jack Simonetta kick), (Drive 3 plays, 28 yards, 01:00; 14-7 Lafayette)

Second quarter

- (12:00) LAF - Jamar Curtis 2 yd run (Jack Simonetta kick), (Drive 7 plays, 46 yards, 03:32; 21-7 Lafayette)
- (07:07) SHU - Jalen Madison 27 yd run (Matt Kling kick), (Drive 9 plays, 78 yards, 04:53; 21-14 Lafayette)
- (01:51) LAF - Jack Simonetta 23 yd field goal, (Drive 13 plays, 63 yards, 05:16; 24-14 Lafayette)

Third quarter

- (09:30) SHU - Matt Kling 42 yd field goal, (Drive 9 plays, 43 yards, 03:58 24-17 Lafayette)

Fourth quarter

- (10:28) LAF - Dean DeNobile 1 yd run (Jack Simonetta kick), (Drive 14 plays, 89 yards, 07:06; 31-17 Lafayette)

Statistics	SHU	LAF
First downs	20	20
Total yards	309	381
Rushing yards	165	297
Passing yards	144	84
Passing: Comp–Att–Int	13–27–0	9–15–1
Time of possession	27:21	32:39

Team	Category	Player	Statistics
Sacred Heart	Passing	John Michalski	13/26, 144 yards
Sacred Heart	Rushing	Jalen Madison	17 carries, 91 yards, 2 TDs
Sacred Heart	Receiving	Kevin McGuire	1 reception, 42 yards
Lafayette	Passing	Dean DeNobile	9/15, 84 yards, INT
Lafayette	Rushing	Jamar Curtis	27 carries, 156 yards, 2 TDs
Lafayette	Receiving	Jamar Curtis	5 receptions, 42 yards

=== vs. Mercyhurst ===
Game Nine – Mercyhurst Lakers (2–5) vs Sacred Heart Pioneers (3–5) – Game summary

Quarter	1	2	3	4	Total
Lakers	0	7	0	7	14
Pioneers	7	14	7	3	31

at Campus Field • Fairfield, Connecticut

- Date: Saturday October 26, 2024
- Game time: 12:00 PM EST
- Game weather: Sunny • Temperature: 63 °F (17 °C) • Wind: SE 17 mph
- Game attendance: 2645
- Referee: Michael Bilica
- TV: SNY

Game information

First quarter

- (11:07) SHU - Kevin McGuire 7 yd pass from John Michalski (Matt Kling kick), (Drive 6 plays, 46 yards, 02:54; 7-0 Sacred Heart)

Second quarter

- (14:08) SHU - Jalen Madison 11 yd run (Matt Kling kick), (Drive 5 plays, 69 yards, 02:20; 14-0 Sacred Heart)
- (05:05) SHU - Xavier Leigh 22 yd run (Matt Kling kick), (Drive 7 plays, 82 yards, 03:40; 21-0 Sacred Heart)
- (00:25) MER - Ayron Rodriguez 9 yd pass from Adam Urena (Nathan Nagucki kick) (Drive 11 plays, 64 yards, 04:34; 21-7 Sacred Heart)

Third quarter

- (01:56) SHU - John Michalski 4 yd run (Matt Kling kick), (Drive 10 plays, 69 yards, 05:03; 28-7 Sacred Heart)

Fourth quarter

- (07:55) MER - Austin Urena 10 yd pass from Adam Urena (Nathan Nagucki kick) (Drive 13 plays, 73 yards, 04:26; 28-14 Sacred Heart)
- (02:58) SHU - Matt Kling 36 yd field goal, (Drive 7 plays, 71 yards, 04:51; 31-14 Sacred Heart)

Statistics	MERCY	SHU
First downs	23	17
Total yards	354	372
Rushing yards	125	231
Passing yards	229	141
Passing: Comp–Att–Int	25–44–0	10–14–0
Time of possession	35:33	24:27

Team	Category	Player	Statistics
Mercyhurst	Passing	Adam Urena	25/43, 229 yards, 2 TDs
Mercyhurst	Rushing	Brian Trobel	17 carries, 96 yards
Mercyhurst	Receiving	Cameron Barmore	9 receptions, 96 yards
Sacred Heart	Passing	John Michalski	10/14, 141 yards, 1 TD
Sacred Heart	Rushing	Jalen Madison	16 carries, 140 yards, 1 TD
Sacred Heart	Receiving	Mason Stahl	1 reception, 48 yards

=== vs. LIU ===
Game Ten – LIU Sharks (2–7) vs Sacred Heart Pioneers (4–5) – Game summary

Quarter	1	2	3	4	Total
Sharks	21	0	7	0	28
Pioneers	0	0	7	0	7

at Campus Field • Fairfield, Connecticut

- Date: Saturday November 9, 2024
- Game time: 12:00 PM EST
- Game weather: Sunny • Temperature: 49 °F (9 °C) • Wind: NW 9mph
- Game attendance: 3136
- Referee: Lance Carlen
- TV announcers (SNY): Jacob Kronberg (play-by-play), Freddie Coleman (analyst) and Morgan Miller (sideline)

Game information

First quarter

- (06:56) LIU - Ethan Greenwood 1 yd run (Michael Coney kick), (Drive 11 plays, 80 yards, 06:12; 7-0 Long Island)
- (02:06) LIU - Ludovick Choquette 12 yd run (Michael Coney kick), (Drive 5 plays, 58 yards, 02:42; 14-0 Long Island)
- (00:00) LIU - Michael Love 67 yd run (Michael Coney kick), (Drive 2 plays, 67 yards, 00:16; 21-0 Long Island)

Second quarter

- no scoring

Third quarter

- (07:33) SHU - Ethan Hilliman 20 yd pass from John Michalski (Matt Kling kick), (Drive 8 plays, 66 yards, 04:21; 21-7 Long Island)
- (00:10) LIU - Ethan Greenwood 55 yd run (Michael Coney kick), (Drive 6 plays, 80 yards, 04:27; 28-7 Long Island)

Fourth quarter

- no scoring

Statistics	LIU	SHU
First downs	19	12
Total yards	505	177
Rushing yards	407	73
Passing yards	98	104
Passing: Comp–Att–Int	7-12-1	16-31-1
Time of possession	32:16	27:44

Team	Category	Player	Statistics
LIU	Passing	Ethan Greenwood	4/6, 52 yards
LIU	Rushing	Ethan Greenwood	20 carries, 140 yards, 2 TDs
LIU	Receiving	Ethan Greenwood	3 receptions, 46 yards
Sacred Heart	Passing	John Michalski	16/31, 104 Yards, 1 TD, 1 INT
Sacred Heart	Rushing	Jalen Madison	10 carries, 35 yards
Sacred Heart	Receiving	Payton Rhoades	3 receptions, 39 yards

=== at Merrimack ===
Game Eleven – Sacred Heart Pioneers (4–6) vs Merrimack Warriors (4–5) – Game summary

Quarter	1	2	3	4	Total
Pioneers	7	7	7	10	31
Warriors	10	7	3	0	20

at Duane Stadium • North Andover, Massachusetts

- Date: Saturday November 16, 2024
- Game time: 12:00 PM EST
- Game weather: Sunny • Temperature: 57 °F (14 °C) • Wind: S 9 mph
- Game attendance: 2896
- Referee: John Smith
- TV: NESN+/ESPN+

Game information

First quarter

- (14:45) MER - Jermaine Corbett 99 yd kickoff return (Lliam Davis kick), 7-0 Merrimack)
- (14:28) SHU - Jalen Madison 73 yd run (Matt Kling kick), (Drive 1 plays, 73 yards, 00:11; 7-7 Tied)
- (02:08) MER - Lliam Davis 31 yd field goal, (Drive 5 plays, 27 yards, 02:38; 10-7 Merrimack)

Second quarter

- (04:46) MER - Jermaine Corbett 18 yd run (Lliam Davis kick), (Drive 8 plays, 36 yards, 04:09; 17-7 Merrimack)
- (02:17) SHU - John Michalski 37 yd run (Matt Kling kick), (Drive 6 plays, 75 yards, 02:29; 17-14 Merrimack)

Third quarter

- (09:30) MER - Lliam Davis 42 yd field goal, (Drive 7 plays, 38 yards, 03:48; 20-14 Merrimack)
- (05:19) SHU - John Michalski 3 yd run (Matt Kling kick), (Drive 8 plays, 75 yards, 04:11; 21-20 Sacred Heart)

Fourth quarter

- (10:48) SHU - Quinn Hart 52 yd interception (Kling, Matt kick), 28-20 Sacred Heart)
- (03:52) SHU - Matt Kling 26 yd field goal, (Drive 7 plays, 38 yards, 04:48; 31-20 Sacred Heart)

Statistics	SHU	MRMK
First downs	14	22
Total yards	341	366
Rushing yards	283	256
Passing yards	58	110
Passing: Comp–Att–Int	4-11-2	10-21-2
Time of possession	24:34	35:26

Team	Category	Player	Statistics
Sacred Heart	Passing	John Michalski	4/11, 58 yards, 2 INTs
Sacred Heart	Rushing	Jalen Madison	21 carries, 170 yards, 1 TD
Sacred Heart	Receiving	Payton Rhoades	2 receptions, 37 yards
Merrimack	Passing	Ayden Pereira	10/21, 110 yards, 2 INTs
Merrimack	Rushing	Jermaine Corbett	22 carries, 163 yards, 1 TD
Merrimack	Receiving	Jalen McDonald	2 receptions, 40 yards
