= 2024 LIU Sharks football team =

Long Island University's football team in 2024

2024 LIU Sharks football
- Conference: Northeast Conference
- Record: 4–8 (3–3 NEC)
- Head coach: Ron Cooper (3rd season)
- Co-offensive coordinators: John Roberts (3rd season); Kort Shankweiler (3rd season)
- Co-defensive coordinators: TyQuan Hammock (1st season); Ryan Jirgl (1st season)
- Home stadium: Bethpage Federal Credit Union Stadium

2024 Northeast Conference football standings
| | Conf. | | | Overall |
| Team | W | | L | W | | L |
|---|---|---|---|---|---|---|
| Central Connecticut +^ | 5 | – | 1 | 7 | – | 6 |
| Duquesne + | 5 | – | 1 | 8 | – | 3 |
| Robert Morris | 4 | – | 2 | 7 | – | 5 |
| LIU | 3 | – | 3 | 4 | – | 8 |
| Wagner | 2 | – | 4 | 4 | – | 8 |
| Saint Francis (PA) | 2 | – | 4 | 4 | – | 7 |
| Mercyhurst* | 0 | – | 0 | 4 | – | 7 |
| Stonehill* | 0 | – | 6 | 1 | – | 10 |
+ – Conference co-champions; ^ – FCS playoff participant; * – Stonehill and Mercyhurst are ineligible for NEC title and FCS postseason play due to transition from NCAA Division II.; Rankings from STATS Poll

The 2024 LIU Sharks football team represented both the LIU Post and LIU Brooklyn campuses of Long Island University as a member of the Northeast Conference (NEC) during the 2024 NCAA Division I FCS football season. The Sharks were led by third-year head coach Ron Cooper and played their home games at Bethpage Federal Credit Union Stadium in Brookville, New York.

== Schedule ==
| Date | Time | Opponent | Site | TV | Result | Attendance |
|---|---|---|---|---|---|---|
| August 31 | 7:00 p.m. | at No. 16 Albany* | Bob Ford Field at Tom & Mary Casey Stadium; Albany, NY | FloSports | L 21–27 | 6,169 |
| September 7 | 8:00 p.m. | at TCU* | Amon G. Carter Stadium; Fort Worth, TX | ESPN+ | L 0–45 | 44,063 |
| September 14 | 12:00 p.m. | Lehigh* | Bethpage Federal Credit Union Stadium; Brookville, NY | NEC Front Row | L 17–20 | 1,643 |
| September 21 | 12:00 p.m. | Rhode Island*^{†} | Bethpage Federal Credit Union Stadium; Brookville, NY | NEC Front Row | L 21–28 | 2,083 |
| September 28 | 6:00 p.m. | at No. 6 Villanova* | Villanova Stadium; Villanova, PA | FloSports | L 10–24 | 6,111 |
| October 5 | 1:00 p.m. | at Duquesne | Rooney Field; Pittsburgh, PA | NEC Front Row | L 21–47 | 2,956 |
| October 12 | 12:00 p.m. | Stonehill | Bethpage Federal Credit Union Stadium; Brookville, NY | NEC Front Row | W 31–7 | 1,257 |
| October 19 | 12:00 p.m. | at Robert Morris | Joe Walton Stadium; Moon Township, PA | NEC Front Row | L 31–45 | 1,855 |
| October 26 | 12:00 p.m. | Central Connecticut | Bethpage Federal Credit Union Stadium; Brookeville, NY | ESPN+, YES | W 24–21 | 453 |
| November 9 | 12:00 p.m. | at Sacred Heart* | Campus Field; Fairfield, CT | SNY | W 28–7 | 3,136 |
| November 16 | 12:00 p.m. | Saint Francis (PA) | Bethpage Federal Credit Union Stadium; Brookeville, NY | NEC Front Row | L 27–34 | 684 |
| November 23 | 12:00 p.m. | at Wagner | Hameline Fielde; Staten Island, NY | NEC Front Row | W 35–28 | 2,467 |
*Non-conference game; ^{†}Homecoming; Rankings from STATS Poll released prior to the game; All times are in Eastern time

== Game summaries ==
=== at No. 16 Albany ===
Game One – LIU Sharks (0–0) vs No. 16 Albany Great Danes (0–0) – Game summary

| Quarter | 1 | 2 | 3 | 4 | Total |
|---|---|---|---|---|---|
| Sharks | 0 | 14 | 7 | 0 | 21 |
| No. 16 Great Danes | 3 | 14 | 10 | 0 | 27 |

at Bob Ford Field at Tom & Mary Casey Stadium • Albany, NY

- Date: August 31, 2024
- Game time: 7:00 pm
- Game weather: Cloudy • Temperature: 75 °F (24 °C) • Wind: N 8 mph
- Game attendance: 6,169
- Referee: Justin Ackley
- TV: FloSports

Game information

First quarter

- (10:34) ALB – John Opalko 42-yard field goal (Drive: 7 plays, 27 yards, 2:50; Albany 3–0)

Second quarter

- (14:54) LIU – Brandon Niemenski 21-yard pass from Luca Stanzani, Michael Coney kick (Drive: 8 plays, 83 yards, 4:49; LIU 7–3)
- (3:54) ALB – Jack Iuliano 20-yard fumble recovery, John Opalko kick (Albany 10–7)
- (0:41) LIU – Michael Love 12-yard pass from Luca Stanzani, Michael Coney kick (Drive: 6 plays, 75 yards, 3:13; LIU 14–10)
- (0:30) ALB – Seven McGee 75-yard pass from Myles Burkett, John Opalko kick (Drive: 1 play, 75 yards, 0:11; Albany 17–14)

Third quarter

- (10:49) LIU – Ludovick Choquette 11-yard pass from Luca Stanzani, Michael Coney kick (Drive: 5 plays, 37 yards, 3:04; LIU 21–17)
- (9:57) ALB – Griffin Woodell 3-yard run, John Opalko kick (Drive: 2 plays, 44 yards, 0:41; Albany 24–21)
- (0:31) ALB – John Opaklo 41-yard field goal (Drive: 14 plays, 55 yards, 7:01; Albany 27–21)

Fourth quarter

No scoring plays

| Statistics | LIU | ALB |
|---|---|---|
| First downs | 20 | 12 |
| Total yards | 358 | 255 |
| Rushing yards | 179 | 90 |
| Passing yards | 179 | 165 |
| Passing: Comp–Att–Int | 20–31–0 | 12–26–0 |
| Time of possession | 32:04 | 27:56 |

| Team | Category | Player | Statistics |
|---|---|---|---|
| LIU | Passing | Luca Stanzani | 20/31, 179 yards, 3 TD |
| LIU | Rushing | Ludovick Choquette | 15 carries, 128 yards |
| LIU | Receiving | Michael Love | 6 receptions, 69 yards, TD |
| Albany | Passing | Myles Burkett | 12/26, 165 yards, TD |
| Albany | Rushing | Griffin Woodell | 20 carries, 85 yards, TD |
| Albany | Receiving | Seven McGee | 5 receptions, 119 yards, TD |

=== at TCU (FBS) ===
Game Two – LIU Sharks (0–1) vs TCU Horned Frogs (FBS) (1–0) – Game summary

| Quarter | 1 | 2 | 3 | 4 | Total |
|---|---|---|---|---|---|
| Sharks | 0 | 0 | 0 | 0 | 0 |
| Horned Frogs (FBS) | 10 | 21 | 7 | 7 | 45 |

at Amon G. Carter Stadium • Fort Worth, TX

- Date: September 7, 2024
- Game time: 8:00 p.m. EST
- Game weather: Sunny • Temperature: 84 °F (29 °C) • Wind N 13 mph
- Game attendance: 44,063
- Referee: Cravonne Barrett
- TV announcers (ESPN+): Ted Emrich (play-by-play) and Dave Steckel (analyst)

Game information

First quarter

- TCU – Kyle Lemmermann 48-yard field goal, 11:35. Horned Frogs 3–0. Drive: 6 plays, 24 yards, 2:06.
- TCU – Cam Cook 1-yard run (Kyle Lemmermann kick), 7:45. Horned Frogs 10–0. Drive: 4 plays, 11 yards, 1:45.

Second quarter

- TCU – JoJo Earle 5-yard pass from Josh Hoover (Kyle Lemmermann kick), 13:37. Horned Frogs 17–0. Drive: 6 plays, 59 yards, 2:07.
- TCU – Dominique Johnson 2-yard run (Kyle Lemmermann kick), 7:25. Horned Frogs 24–0. Drive: 9 plays, 69 yards, 4:02.
- TCU – Cam Cook 12-yard run (Kyle Lemmermann kick), 1:52. Horned Frogs 31–0. Drive: 7 plays, 54 yards, 2:26.

Third quarter

- TCU – Cam Cook 5-yard run (Kyle Lemmermann kick), 12:45. Horned Frogs 38–0. Drive: 4 plays, 79 yards, 2:08.

Fourth quarter

- TCU – Chase Curtis 18-yard pass from Josh Hoover (Kyle Lemmermann kick), 11:29. Horned Frogs 45–0. Drive: 11 plays, 42 yards, 4:13.

| Statistics | LIU | TCU |
|---|---|---|
| First downs | 9 | 22 |
| Total yards | 127 | 495 |
| Rushing yards | 59 | 127 |
| Passing yards | 68 | 298 |
| Passing: Comp–Att–Int | 9-22-1 | 24-30-0 |
| Time of possession | 30:31 | 29:29 |

| Team | Category | Player | Statistics |
|---|---|---|---|
| LIU | Passing | Luca Stanzani | 8/18, 60 yards, INT |
| LIU | Rushing | Ethan Greenwood | 7 carries, 24 yards |
| LIU | Receiving | Aviyon Smith-Mack | 2 receptions, 35 yards |
| TCU | Passing | Josh Hoover | 20/25, 267 yards, 2 TD |
| TCU | Rushing | Cam Cook | 13 carries, 60 yards, 3 TD |
| TCU | Receiving | Savion Williams | 5 receptions, 65 yards |

=== Lehigh ===
Game Three – Lehigh Mountain Hawks (1–1) at LIU Sharks (0–2) – Game summary

| Quarter | 1 | 2 | 3 | 4 | Total |
|---|---|---|---|---|---|
| Mountain Hawks | 0 | 13 | 7 | 0 | 20 |
| Sharks | 7 | 0 | 10 | 0 | 17 |

at Bethpage Federal Credit Union Stadium • Brookville, New York

- Date: September 14, 2024
- Game time: 12:00 p.m. EST
- Game weather: Sunny • Temperature: 80 °F (27 °C)
- Game attendance: 1,643
- Referee: Travis Barta
- TV announcers (NEC Front Row): TBD

Game information

First quarter

- (2:31) LIU - Luca Stanzani 13 yard pass to Michael Love, Michael Coney kick (Drive: 9 plays, 72 yards, 5:09; LIU 7-0)

Second quarter

- (14:49) LEH - Luke Yoder 10 yard run, Nick Garrido Kick (Drive: 6 plays, 65 yards, 2:33; TIED 7-7)
- (0:12) LEH - Hayden Johnson 7 yard pass to Geoffrey Jamiel, Nick Garrido PAT failed (Drive: 16 plays, 67 yards, 8:40; Lehigh 13-7)

Third quarter

- (10:00) LIU - Luca Stanzani 3 yard pass to Michael Love, Michael Coney kick (Drive: 7 plays, 55 yards, 3:16 LIU 14-13)
- (5:42) LEH - Dante Perri 27 yard pass to Mason Humphrey Nick Garrido kick (Drive: 5 plays, 55 yards, 2:28; Lehigh 20-14)
- (0:37) LIU - Michael Coney 27 yard kick (Drive: 11 plays, 65 yards, 5:05; Lehigh 20-17)

Fourth quarter

No scoring

| Statistics | LEH | LIU |
|---|---|---|
| First downs | 20 | 15 |
| Total yards | 282 | 320 |
| Rushing yards | 143 | 166 |
| Passing yards | 139 | 154 |
| Passing: Comp–Att–Int | 10–18–0 | 16–26–1 |
| Time of possession | 33:55 | 26:05 |

| Team | Category | Player | Statistics |
|---|---|---|---|
| Lehigh | Passing | Dante Perri | 6/14, 113 yards, TD |
| Lehigh | Rushing | Luke Yoder | 23 carries, 94 yards, TD |
| Lehigh | Receiving | Logan Galletta | 2 receptions, 47 yards |
| LIU | Passing | Luca Stanzani | 16/26, 160 yards, 2 TD, INT |
| LIU | Rushing | Ethan Greenwood | 5 carries, 65 yards |
| LIU | Receiving | Cory Nichols | 7 receptions, 52 yards, 2 TD |

=== Rhode Island ===
Game Four – Rhode Island Rams (2–1) at LIU Sharks (0–3) – Game summary

| Quarter | 1 | 2 | 3 | 4 | Total |
|---|---|---|---|---|---|
| Rams | 0 | 7 | 0 | 21 | 28 |
| Sharks | 0 | 14 | 0 | 7 | 21 |

at Bethpage Federal Credit Union Stadium • Brookville, New York

- Date: September 21, 2024
- Game time: 12:00 p.m. EST
- Game weather: Sunny • Temperature: 73 °F (23 °C)
- Game attendance: 2,083
- Referee: Michael Quinn
- TV announcers (NEC Front Row): TBD

Game information

First quarter

- (11:45) URI – Malik Grant 7-yard run, Ty Groff kick (Drive: 4 plays, 58 yards, 1:38; Rhode Island 7–0)

Second quarter

- (9:16) LIU – Ludovick Choquette 28-yard pass from Luca Stanzani, Michael Coney kick (Drive: 8 plays, 60 yards, 4:15; Tied 7–7)
- (0:26) LIU – Luca Stanzani 7-yard run, Michael Coney kick (Drive: 6 plays, 23 yards, 1:43; LIU 14–7)

Third quarter

No scoring plays

Fourth quarter

- (11:35) URI – Malik Grant 11-yard run, Ty Groff kick (Drive: 9 plays, 80 yards, 4:19; Tied 14–14)
- (9:13) LIU – Michael Love 42-yard pass from Luca Stanzani, Michael Coney kick (Drive: 4 plays, 68 yards, 2:15; LIU 21–14)
- (3:43) URI – Hunter Helms 4-yard run, Ty Groff kick (Drive: 2 plays, 5 yards, 0:41; Tied 21–21)
- (1:08) URI – Malik Grant 8-yard run, Ty Groff kick (Drive: 7 plays, 67 yards, 1:37; Rhode Island 28–21)

| Statistics | URI | LIU |
|---|---|---|
| First downs | 21 | 20 |
| Total yards | 344 | 371 |
| Rushing yards | 210 | 174 |
| Passing yards | 134 | 197 |
| Passing: Comp–Att–Int | 11–19–0 | 19–32–0 |
| Time of possession | 22:38 | 37:22 |

| Team | Category | Player | Statistics |
|---|---|---|---|
| Rhode Island | Passing | Hunter Helms | 7/10, 90 yards |
| Rhode Island | Rushing | Malik Grant | 20 carries, 141 yards, 3 TD |
| Rhode Island | Receiving | Greg Gaines | 4 receptions, 44 yards |
| LIU | Passing | Luca Stanzani | 16/27, 176 yards, 2 TD |
| LIU | Rushing | Ludovick Choquette | 16 carries, 70 yards |
| LIU | Receiving | Michael Love | 6 receptions, 77 yards, TD |

=== at No. 6 Villanova ===
Game Five – LIU Sharks (0–4) at No. 6 Villanova Wildcats (3–1) – Game summary

| Quarter | 1 | 2 | 3 | 4 | Total |
|---|---|---|---|---|---|
| Sharks | 0 | 0 | 0 | 10 | 10 |
| No. 6 Wildcats | 10 | 7 | 0 | 7 | 24 |

at Villanova Stadium, Villanova, PA

- Date: Saturday September 28, 2024
- Game time: 6:00 p.m.
- Game weather: Cloudy • Temperature: 68 °F (20 °C) • Wind: NE 8 mph
- Game attendance: 6,111
- Referee: Todd Bowman
- TV announcers (FloSports): TBD

Game information

First quarter

- (7:55) VIL – Ethan Gettman 24-yard field goal (Drive: 13 plays, 84 yards, 6:55; Villanova 3–0)
- (3:04) VIL – Isaiah Ragland 12-yard run, Ethan Gettman kick (Drive: 3 plays, 19 yards, 1:57; Villanova 10–0)

Second quarter

- (0:34) VIL – Isaiah Ragland 1-yard run, Ethan Gettman kick (Drive: 11 plays, 89 yards, 1:57; Villanova 17–0)

Third quarter

No scoring plays

Fourth quarter

- (14:55) VIL – David Avit 5-yard run, Ethan Gettman kick (Drive: 2 plays, 19 yards, 0:17; Villanova 24–0)
- (12:12) LIU – Pat Bowen 25-yard run, Michael Coney kick (Drive: 4 plays, 75 yards, 2:43; Villanova 24–7)
- (6:33) LIU – Michael Coney 42-yard field goal (Drive: 9 plays, 41 yards, 4:04; Villanova 24–10)

| Statistics | LIU | VILL |
|---|---|---|
| First downs | 10 | 22 |
| Total yards | 176 | 392 |
| Rushing yards | 96 | 264 |
| Passing yards | 80 | 128 |
| Passing: Comp–Att–Int | 11–24–0 | 10–19–0 |
| Time of possession | 22:55 | 37:05 |

| Team | Category | Player | Statistics |
|---|---|---|---|
| LIU | Passing | Luca Stanzani | 11/24, 80 yards |
| LIU | Rushing | Ludovick Choquette | 9 carries, 62 yards |
| LIU | Receiving | Michael Love | 3 receptions, 36 yards |
| Villanova | Passing | Connor Watkins | 10/18, 128 yards |
| Villanova | Rushing | David Avit | 24 carries, 160 yards, TD |
| Villanova | Receiving | Jaylan Sanchez | 2 receptions, 55 yards |

=== at Duquesne ===
Game Six – LIU Sharks (0–5) vs Duquesne Dukes (2–2) – Game summary

| Quarter | 1 | 2 | 3 | 4 | Total |
|---|---|---|---|---|---|
| Sharks | 0 | 7 | 7 | 7 | 21 |
| Dukes | 19 | 14 | 7 | 7 | 47 |

at Arthur J. Rooney Athletic Field • Pittsburgh, PA

- Date: Saturday October 5, 2024
- Game time: 1:00 PM
- Game weather: 0 °F (−18 °C)
- TV: NEC Front Row

Game information

First quarter
Second quarter
Third quarter
Fourth quarter

| Statistics | LIU | DUQ |
|---|---|---|
| First downs | | |
| Total yards | | |
| Rushing yards | | |
| Passing yards | | |
| Passing: Comp–Att–Int | | |
| Time of possession | | |

| Team | Category | Player | Statistics |
|---|---|---|---|
| LIU | Passing | | |
| LIU | Rushing | | |
| LIU | Receiving | | |
| Duquesne | Passing | | |
| Duquesne | Rushing | | |
| Duquesne | Receiving | | |

=== Stonehill ===
Game Seven – Stonehill Skyhawks (1–3) vs LIU Sharks (0–6) – Game summary

| Quarter | 1 | 2 | 3 | 4 | Total |
|---|---|---|---|---|---|
| Skyhawks | 7 | 0 | 0 | 0 | 7 |
| Sharks | 7 | 10 | 7 | 7 | 31 |

at Bethpage Federal Credit Union Stadium • Brookville, NY

- Date: Saturday October 12, 2024
- Game time: 12:00 PM
- TV: NEC Front Row

Game information

First quarter
Second quarter
Third quarter
Fourth quarter

| Statistics | STO | LIU |
|---|---|---|
| First downs | | |
| Total yards | | |
| Rushing yards | | |
| Passing yards | | |
| Passing: Comp–Att–Int | | |
| Time of possession | | |

| Team | Category | Player | Statistics |
|---|---|---|---|
| Stonehill | Passing | | |
| Stonehill | Rushing | | |
| Stonehill | Receiving | | |
| LIU | Passing | | |
| LIU | Rushing | | |
| LIU | Receiving | | |

=== at Robert Morris ===
Game Eight – LIU Sharks (1–6) vs Robert Morris Colonials (3–3) – Game summary

| Quarter | 1 | 2 | 3 | 4 | Total |
|---|---|---|---|---|---|
| Sharks | 7 | 3 | 14 | 7 | 31 |
| Colonials | 10 | 13 | 7 | 15 | 45 |

at Joe Walton Stadium, Moon Township, Pennsylvania

- Date: Saturday October 19, 2024
- Game time: 12:00 PM
- TV: NEC Front Row

Game information

First quarter
Second quarter
Third quarter
Fourth quarter

| Statistics | LIU | RMU |
|---|---|---|
| First downs | | |
| Total yards | | |
| Rushing yards | | |
| Passing yards | | |
| Passing: Comp–Att–Int | | |
| Time of possession | | |

| Team | Category | Player | Statistics |
|---|---|---|---|
| LIU | Passing | | |
| LIU | Rushing | | |
| LIU | Receiving | | |
| Robert Morris | Passing | | |
| Robert Morris | Rushing | | |
| Robert Morris | Receiving | | |

=== Central Connecticut ===
Game Nine – Central Connecticut Blue Devils (3–4) vs LIU Sharks (1–7) – Game summary

| Quarter | 1 | 2 | 3 | 4 | Total |
|---|---|---|---|---|---|
| Blue Devils | 7 | 0 | 7 | 7 | 21 |
| Sharks | 3 | 14 | 0 | 7 | 24 |

at Bethpage Federal Credit Union Stadium • Brookville, New York

- Date: Saturday October 26, 2024
- Game time: 12:00 PM EST
- Game weather: Sunny, 62 °F (17 °C)
- Game attendance: 453
- Referee: Travis Barta
- TV announcers (ESPN+/YES): Paul Dottino (play-by-play) and Kevin Gilbride (analyst)

Game information

First quarter

- (9:49) CCSU - Jadon Turner 7 Yd Run (Jack Barnum Kick) (Drive: 6 plays, 34 yards, 2:56; Central Connecticut 7-0)
- (1:14) LIU - Michael Coney 23 Yd Field Goal (Drive: 14 plays, 69 yards, 8:35; Central Connecticut 7-3)

Second quarter

- (10:28) LIU - Cory Nichols 7 Yd pass from Ethan Greenwood (Michael Coney Kick) (Drive: 9 plays, 55 yards, 4:24; Long Island 10-7)
- (1:07) LIU - Pat Bowen 24 Yd pass from Ethan Greenwood (Michael Coney Kick) (Drive: 9 plays, 75 yards, 2:57; Long Island 17-7)

Third quarter

- (7:39) CCSU - Isaac Boston 15 Yd pass from Brady Olson (Jack Barnum Kick) (Drive: 17 plays, 75 yards, 7:14; Long Island 17-14)

Fourth quarter

- (10:34) CCSU - Brady Olson 8 Yd Run (Jack Barnum Kick) (Drive: 5 plays, 27 yards, 2:04; Central Connecticut 21-17)
- (7:58) LIU - Ethan Greenwood 26 Yd pass from Luca Stanzani (Michael Coney Kick) (Drive: 6 plays, 75 yards, 2:36; Long Island 24-21)

| Statistics | CCSU | LIU |
|---|---|---|
| First downs | 24 | 16 |
| Total yards | 335 | 297 |
| Rushing yards | 134 | 148 |
| Passing yards | 201 | 149 |
| Passing: Comp–Att–Int | 21–35–0 | 12–16–0 |
| Time of possession | 33:12 | 26:48 |

| Team | Category | Player | Statistics |
|---|---|---|---|
| Central Connecticut | Passing | Brady Olson | 20/34, 185 yards, TD |
| Central Connecticut | Rushing | Brady Olson | 9 carries, 46 yards |
| Central Connecticut | Receiving | Michael Plaskon | 6 receptions, 67 yards |
| LIU | Passing | Ethan Greenwood | 10/14, 120 yards, 2 TD |
| LIU | Rushing | Ethan Greenwood | 18 carries, 66 yards |
| LIU | Receiving | Michael Love | 6 receptions, 84 yards |

=== at Sacred Heart ===
Game Ten – LIU Sharks (2–7) vs Sacred Heart Pioneers (4–5) – Game summary

| Quarter | 1 | 2 | 3 | 4 | Total |
|---|---|---|---|---|---|
| Sharks | 21 | 0 | 7 | 0 | 28 |
| Pioneers | 0 | 0 | 7 | 0 | 7 |

at Campus Field • Fairfield, Connecticut

- Date: Saturday November 9, 2024
- Game time: 12:00 PM EST
- Game weather: Sunny • Temperature: 49 °F (9 °C) • Wind: NW 9mph
- Game attendance: 3136
- Referee: Lance Carlen
- TV announcers (SNY): Jacob Kronberg (play-by-play), Freddie Coleman (analyst) and Morgan Miller (sideline)

Game information

First quarter

- (06:56) LIU - [[Ethan Greenwood[[ 1 yd run (Michael Coney kick), (Drive 11 plays, 80 yards, 06:12; 7-0 Long Island)
- (02:06) LIU - Ludovick Choquette 12 yd run (Michael Coney kick), (Drive 5 plays, 58 yards, 02:42; 14-0 Long Island)
- (00:00) LIU - Michael Love 67 yd run (Michael Coney kick), (Drive 2 plays, 67 yards, 00:16; 21-0 Long Island)

Second quarter

- no scoring

Third quarter

- (07:33) SHU - Ethan Hilliman 20 yd pass from John Michalski (Matt Kling kick), (Drive 8 plays, 66 yards, 04:21; 21-7 Long Island)
- (00:10) LIU - Ethan Greenwood 55 yd run (Michael Coney kick), (Drive 6 plays, 80 yards, 04:27; 28-7 Long Island)

Fourth quarter

- no scoring

| Statistics | LIU | SHU |
|---|---|---|
| First downs | 19 | 12 |
| Total yards | 505 | 177 |
| Rushing yards | 407 | 73 |
| Passing yards | 98 | 104 |
| Passing: Comp–Att–Int | 7-12-1 | 16-31-1 |
| Time of possession | 32:16 | 27:44 |

| Team | Category | Player | Statistics |
|---|---|---|---|
| LIU | Passing | Ethan Greenwood | 4/6, 52 yards |
| LIU | Rushing | Ethan Greenwood | 20 carries, 140 yards, 2 TD |
| LIU | Receiving | Ethan Greenwood | 3 receptions, 46 yards |
| Sacred Heart | Passing | John Michalski | 16/31, 104 Yards, 1 TD, 1 INT |
| Sacred Heart | Rushing | Jalen Madison | 10 carries, 35 yards |
| Sacred Heart | Receiving | Payton Rhoades | 3 receptions, 39 yards |

=== Saint Francis (PA) ===
Game Eleven – Saint Francis Red Flash (3–6) vs LIU Sharks (4–7) – Game summary

| Quarter | 1 | 2 | 3 | 4 | Total |
|---|---|---|---|---|---|
| Red Flash | 0 | 17 | 7 | 10 | 34 |
| Sharks | 7 | 10 | 10 | 0 | 27 |

at Bethpage Federal Credit Union Stadium • Brookville, New York

- Date: Saturday November 16, 2024
- Game time: 12:00 PM EST
- Game weather: 0 °F (−18 °C)
- TV announcers (NEC Front Row): TBD

Game information

First quarter
Second quarter
Third quarter
Fourth quarter

| Statistics | SFPA | LIU |
|---|---|---|
| First downs | | |
| Total yards | | |
| Rushing yards | | |
| Passing yards | | |
| Passing: Comp–Att–Int | | |
| Time of possession | | |

| Team | Category | Player | Statistics |
|---|---|---|---|
| Saint Francis (PA) | Passing | | |
| Saint Francis (PA) | Rushing | | |
| Saint Francis (PA) | Receiving | | |
| LIU | Passing | | |
| LIU | Rushing | | |
| LIU | Receiving | | |

=== at Wagner ===
Game Twelve – LIU Sharks (0–0) vs Wagner Seahawks (0–0) – Game summary

| Quarter | 1 | 2 | 3 | 4 | Total |
|---|---|---|---|---|---|
| Sharks | 21 | 7 | 0 | 7 | 35 |
| Seahawks | 7 | 7 | 7 | 7 | 28 |

at Hameline Field • Staten Island, New York

- Date: Saturday November 23, 2024
- Game time: 12:00 PM EST
- Game weather: 0 °F (−18 °C)
- TV announcers (NEC Front Row): TBD

Game information

First quarter
Second quarter
Third quarter
Fourth quarter

| Statistics | LIU | WAG |
|---|---|---|
| First downs | | |
| Total yards | | |
| Rushing yards | | |
| Passing yards | | |
| Passing: Comp–Att–Int | | |
| Time of possession | | |

| Team | Category | Player | Statistics |
|---|---|---|---|
| LIU | Passing | | |
| LIU | Rushing | | |
| LIU | Receiving | | |
| Wagner | Passing | | |
| Wagner | Rushing | | |
| Wagner | Receiving | | |
