= 2024 Merrimack Warriors football team =

Merrimack College in the 2024 NCAA Division I FCS football season

2024 Merrimack Warriors football
- Conference: Independent
- Record: 5–6
- Head coach: Mike Gennetti (1st season)
- Offensive coordinator: Aynsley Rosenbaum (2nd season)
- Home stadium: Duane Stadium

2024 NCAA Division I FCS independents football standings
	Conf.			Overall
Team	W		L	W		L
Sacred Heart		–		5	–	6
Merrimack		–		5	–	6

The 2024 Merrimack Warriors football team represented Merrimack College as an independent in the 2024 NCAA Division I FCS football season. Led by first-year head coach Mike Gennetti, the Warriors compiled a record of 5–6. Merrimack played home games at Duane Stadium in North Andover, Massachusetts.

== Schedule ==
Date	Time	Opponent	Site	TV	Result	Attendance
August 31	2:30 p.m.	at Air Force	Falcon Stadium; Colorado Springs, CO	CBSSN	L 6–21	31,658
September 7	12:00 p.m.	at UConn	Rentschler Field; East Hartford, CT	WFSB	L 17–63	32,351
September 14	6:00 p.m.	at Bucknell	Christy Mathewson–Memorial Stadium; Lewisburg, PA	ESPN+	W 31–28	1,943
September 21	1:00 p.m.	Maine	Duane Stadium; North Andover, MA	NESN+/ESPN+	L 15–26	2,547
September 28	1:00 p.m.	Dartmouth^{†}	Duane Stadium; North Andover, MA	NESN+/ESPN+	L 14–16	15,211
October 12	1:00 p.m.	at Morgan State	Hughes Stadium; Baltimore, MD	ESPN+	W 32–24	3,584
October 19	1:00 p.m.	Stonehill	Duane Stadium; North Andover, MA	NESN+/ESPN+	W 48–28	3,362
October 26	1:00 p.m.	Colgate	Duane Stadium; North Andover, MA	NESN+/ESPN+	W 51–17	2,163
November 2	12:00 p.m.	at Robert Morris	Joe Walton Stadium; Moon Township, PA	NEC Front Row	L 0–6	1,091
November 16	12:00 p.m.	Sacred Heart	Duane Stadium; North Andover, MA	NESN+/ESPN+	L 20–31	2,896
November 23	1:00 p.m.	at Fordham	Coffey Field; Bronx, NY	ESPN+	W 19–3	
^{†}Homecoming; All times are in Eastern time

== Game summaries ==
=== at Air Force (FBS) ===
Game One – Merrimack Warriors (0–0) vs Air Force Falcons (FBS) (0–0) – Game summary

Quarter	1	2	3	4	Total
Warriors	0	0	0	6	6
Falcons (FBS)	7	7	0	7	21

at Falcon Stadium • Colorado Springs, CO

- Date: August 31, 2024
- Game time: 2:30 p.m. EST
- Game weather: Sunny, 83 °F (28 °C)
- Game attendance: 31,658
- Referee: Kenneth Ray
- TV announcers (CBSSN): Chris Lewis (play-by-play) and Robert Turbin (analyst)

Game information

First quarter

- (6:02) AF – Cade Harris 2 yard run, Matthew Dapore kick (Drive: 13 plays, 38 yards, 6:51; Air Force 7–0)

Second quarter

- (0:16) AF – Cade Harris 4 yard run, Matthew Dapore kick (Drive: 11 plays, 80 yards, 1:32; Air Force 14–0)

Third quarter

No scoring

Fourth quarter

- (8:31) AF – Aiden Calvert 1 yard run, Matthew Dapore kick (Drive: 6 plays, 14 yards, 3:12; Air Force 21–0)
- (0:00) MER – Jalen McDonald 11 yard pass from Ayden Pereira (Drive: 15 plays, 50 yards, 3:40; Air Force 21–6)

Statistics	MRMK	AFA
First downs	10	15
Total yards	57–217	69–237
Rushing yards	27–114	55–166
Passing yards	103	71
Passing: Comp–Att–Int	17–30–0	6–14–0
Time of possession	26:56	33:04

Team	Category	Player	Statistics
Merrimack	Passing	Malakai Anthony	14/21, 74 yards
Merrimack	Rushing	Jermaine Corbett	8 carries, 59 yards
Merrimack	Receiving	Jalen McDonald	5 receptions, 39 yards, 1 TD
Air Force	Passing	John Busha	6/14, 71 yards
Air Force	Rushing	Owen Allen	16 carries, 63 yards
Air Force	Receiving	Aiden Calvert	1 reception, 21 yards

=== at UConn (FBS) ===
Game Two – Merrimack Warriors (0–1) at UConn Huskies (FBS) (0–1) – Game summary

Quarter	1	2	3	4	Total
Warriors	7	0	0	10	17
Huskies (FBS)	35	21	7	0	63

at Pratt & Whitney Stadium at Rentschler Field, East Hartford, Connecticut

- Date: September 7
- Game time: 12:03 p.m. EDT
- Game weather: Cloudy, 73 °F (23 °C), Wind S 9MPH
- Game attendance: 32,351
- Referee: Brad Carrell
- TV announcers (WFSB): Randy Brochu (play-by-play), Marc Robbins (color analyst) & Joe Zone (sideline)

Game information

First quarter

- CONN - Fagnano, Joe 1 yd run (Freeman, Chris kick), 13:00. Huskies 7–0. Drive: 5 plays, 75 yards, TOP 02:00
- CONN - Edwards, Cam 50 yd pass from Fagnano, Joe (Freeman, Chris kick), 9:41. Huskies 14–0. Drive: 4 plays, 64 yards, TOP 01:32
- CONN - Robinson, Durell 48 yd run (Freeman, Chris kick), 7:49. Huskies 21–0. Drive: 1 plays, 48 yards, TOP 00:09
- CONN - Rosa, Victor 29 yd run (Freeman, Chris kick), 4:40. Huskies 28–0. Drive: 4 plays, 54 yards, TOP 01:48
- MC - Corbett, Jermaine 46 yd run (Davis, Lliam kick), 1:39. Huskies 28–7. Drive: 6 plays, 82 yards, TOP 03:01
- CONN - Bell, Skyler 60 yd pass from Fagnano, Joe (Freeman, Chris kick), 0:27. Huskies 35–7. Drive: 2 plays, 62 yards, TOP 00:45

Second quarter

- CONN - Porter, Shamar 39 yd pass from Fagnano, Joe (Freeman, Chris kick), 13:18. Huskies 42–7. Drive: 3 plays, 50 yards, TOP 01:04
- CONN - Edwards, Cam 1 yd run (Freeman, Chris kick), 5:58. Huskies 49–7. Drive: 10 plays, 78 yards, TOP 04:39
- CONN - Anderson, Ezeriah 44 yd pass from Fagnano, Joe (Freeman, Chris kick), 3:24. Huskies 56–7. Drive: 2 plays, 44 yards, TOP 00:31

Third quarter

- CONN - Honig, Alex 12 yd pass from Fagnano, Joe (Freeman, Chris kick), 6:10. Huskies 63–7. Drive: 8 plays, 81 yards, TOP 03:16

Fourth quarter

- MC - Sweitzer, Seth 71 yd pass from Lewis, Justin (Davis, Lliam kick), 7:31. Huskies 63–14. Drive: 1 plays, 71 yards, TOP 00:15
- MC - Davis, Lliam 32 yd field goal, 0:00. Huskies 63–17. Drive: 12 plays, 49 yards, TOP 05:37

Statistics	MRMK	CONN
First downs	13	26
Total yards	279	624
Rushing yards	124	278
Passing yards	155	346
Turnovers	0	0
Time of possession	31:52	28:08

Team	Category	Player	Statistics
Merrimack	Passing	Justin Lewis	6/6, 103 yards, 1 TD
Merrimack	Rushing	Jermaine Corbett	14 carries, 103 yards, 1 TD
Merrimack	Receiving	Seth Sweitzer	2 receptions, 77 yards, 1 TD
UConn	Passing	Joseph Fagnano	13/19, 328 yards, 5 TDs
UConn	Rushing	Durell Robinson	10 carries, 94 yards, 1 TD
UConn	Receiving	Skyler Bell	2 receptions, 105 yards, 1 TD

=== at Bucknell ===
Game Three – Merrimack Warriors (0–2) at Bucknell Bison (1–1) – Game summary

Quarter	1	2	3	4	Total
Warriors	3	14	14	0	31
Bison	7	7	0	7	21

at Christy Mathewson–Memorial Stadium • Lewisburg, Pennsylvania

- Date: Saturday September 14, 2024
- Game time: 6:00 p.m.
- Game weather: 83 °F (28 °C)
- TV: ESPN+

Game information

First quarter
Second quarter
Third quarter
Fourth quarter

Statistics	MRMK	BUCK
First downs	21	21
Total yards	405	260
Rushing yards	258	96
Passing yards	147	164
Passing: Comp–Att–Int	11-15-0	17-30-2
Time of possession	35:28	24:32

Team	Category	Player	Statistics
Merrimack	Passing		
Merrimack	Rushing		
Merrimack	Receiving		
Bucknell	Passing		
Bucknell	Rushing		
Bucknell	Receiving		

=== Maine ===
Game Four – Maine Black Bears (1–2) vs Merrimack Warriors (1–2) – Game summary

Quarter	1	2	3	4	Total
Black Bears	0	6	7	13	26
Warriors	10	5	0	0	15

at Duane Stadium • North Andover, MA

- Date: Saturday September 21, 2024
- Game time: 1:00 PM EST
- Game weather: 0 °F (−18 °C)
- TV announcers (TBD): TBD

Game information

First quarter
Second quarter
Third quarter
Fourth quarter

Statistics	ME	MRMK
First downs	21	8
Total yards	336	195
Rushing yards	112	103
Passing yards	224	92
Passing: Comp–Att–Int	18–27–0	13–25–2
Time of possession	34:47	25:13

Team	Category	Player	Statistics
Maine	Passing	Carter Peevy	17/26, 225 yards, 2 TD
Maine	Rushing	Tavion Banks	13 carries, 55 yards, 1 TD
Maine	Receiving	Joe Gillette	4 receptions, 86 yards
Merrimack	Passing	Justin Lewis	8/13, 67 yards, 2 INT
Merrimack	Rushing	Jermaine Corbett	15 carries, 81 yards
Merrimack	Receiving	Jared Dunn	3 receptions, 35 yards

=== Dartmouth ===
Game Five – Dartmouth Big Green (1–0) vs Merrimack Warriors (1–3) – Game summary

Quarter	1	2	3	4	Total
Big Green	7	3	0	6	16
Warriors	7	0	7	0	14

at Duane Stadium • North Andover, MA

- Date: Saturday September 28, 2024
- Game time: 1:00 PM EST
- Game weather: 67 °F (19 °C)
- TV announcers (NESN+/ESPN+): TBD

Game information

First quarter
Second quarter
Third quarter
Fourth quarter

Statistics	DART	MRMK
First downs	18	15
Total yards	280	264
Rushing yards	119	165
Passing yards	161	99
Passing: Comp–Att–Int	14-29-0	12-15-0
Time of possession	30:45	29:15

Team	Category	Player	Statistics
Dartmouth	Passing		
Dartmouth	Rushing		
Dartmouth	Receiving		
Merrimack	Passing		
Merrimack	Rushing		
Merrimack	Receiving		

=== at Morgan State ===
Game Six – Merrimack Warriors (1–4) at Morgan State Bears (3–3) – Game summary

Quarter	1	2	3	4	Total
Warriors	7	13	0	12	32
Bears	0	3	14	7	24

at Hughes Stadium • Baltimore, MD

- Date: Saturday October 12, 2024
- Game time: 3:00 p.m.
- Game weather: Sunny, 75 °F (24 °C)
- TV: ESPN+

Game information

First quarter
Second quarter
Third quarter
Fourth quarter

Statistics	MRMK	MORG
First downs	6	22
Total yards	172	328
Rushing yards	107	142
Passing yards	65	186
Passing: Comp–Att–Int	5-8-0	24-31-0
Time of possession	20:34	39:56

Team	Category	Player	Statistics
Merrimack	Passing		
Merrimack	Rushing		
Merrimack	Receiving		
Morgan State	Passing		
Morgan State	Rushing		
Morgan State	Receiving		

=== Stonehill ===
Game Seven – Stonehill Skyhawks (1–4) vs Merrimack Warriors (2–4) – Game summary

Quarter	1	2	3	4	Total
Skyhawks	0	0	21	7	28
Warriors	17	10	7	14	48

at Duane Stadium • North Andover, MA

- Date: Saturday October 19, 2024
- Game time: 1:00 PM
- TV: NESN+/ESPN+

Game information

First quarter
Second quarter
Third quarter
Fourth quarter

Statistics	STO	MRMK
First downs	21	24
Total yards	321	479
Rushing yards	155	375
Passing yards	166	104
Passing: Comp–Att–Int	12-24-2	9-15-0
Time of possession	25:37	34:23

Team	Category	Player	Statistics
Stonehill	Passing	Jack O'Connell	12/24, 166 yards, 1 TD, 2 INT
Stonehill	Rushing	Jarel Washington	13 carries, 56 yards, 1 TD
Stonehill	Receiving	Cody Ruff	4 receptions, 56 yards, 1 TD
Merrimack	Passing	Ayden Pereira	8/14, 94 yards, 2 TD
Merrimack	Rushing	Jermaine Corbett	23 carries, 170 yards, 2 TD
Merrimack	Receiving	Jalen McDonald	1 receptions, 51 yards, 1 TD

=== Colgate ===
Game Eight – Colgate Raiders (2–5) at Merrimack Warriors (3–4) – Game summary

Quarter	1	2	3	4	Total
Raiders	3	7	7	0	17
Warriors	7	10	20	14	51

at Duane Stadium • North Andover, MA

- Date: Saturday October 26, 2024
- Game time: 1:00 p.m.
- Game weather: Sunny 59 °F (15 °C)
- TV: NESN+/ESPN+

Game information

First quarter
Second quarter
Third quarter
Fourth quarter

Statistics	COLG	MRMK
First downs	18	24
Total yards	283	538
Rushing yards	128	243
Passing yards	155	295
Passing: Comp–Att–Int	15-28-2	15-20-0
Time of possession	24:05	35:55

Team	Category	Player	Statistics
Colgate	Passing		
Colgate	Rushing		
Colgate	Receiving		
Merrimack	Passing		
Merrimack	Rushing		
Merrimack	Receiving		

=== at Robert Morris ===
Game Nine – Merrimack Warriors (4–4) vs Robert Morris Colonials (5–3) – Game summary

Quarter	1	2	3	4	Total
Warriors	0	0	0	0	0
Colonials	0	0	6	0	6

at Joe Walton Stadium, Moon Township, Pennsylvania

- Date: Saturday November 2, 2024
- Game time: 12:00 PM
- TV: NEC Front Row

Game information

First quarter
Second quarter
Third quarter
Fourth quarter

Statistics	MRMK	RMU
First downs	15	16
Total yards	264	367
Rushing yards	147	131
Passing yards	117	236
Passing: Comp–Att–Int	9-17-0	23-33-1
Time of possession	29:15	30:45

Team	Category	Player	Statistics
Merrimack	Passing		
Merrimack	Rushing		
Merrimack	Receiving		
Robert Morris	Passing		
Robert Morris	Rushing		
Robert Morris	Receiving		

=== Sacred Heart ===
Game Ten – Sacred Heart Pioneers (4–6) vs Merrimack Warriors (4–5) – Game summary

Quarter	1	2	3	4	Total
Pioneers	7	7	7	10	31
Warriors	10	7	3	0	20

at Duane Stadium • North Andover, MA

- Date: Saturday November 16, 2024
- Game time: 12:00 PM EST
- Game weather: 0 °F (−18 °C)
- TV announcers (NESN+/ESPN+): TBD

Game information

First quarter
Second quarter
Third quarter
Fourth quarter

Statistics	SHU	MRMK
First downs	14	22
Total yards	341	366
Rushing yards	283	256
Passing yards	58	110
Passing: Comp–Att–Int	4-11-2	10-21-2
Time of possession	24:34	35:26

Team	Category	Player	Statistics
Sacred Heart	Passing		
Sacred Heart	Rushing		
Sacred Heart	Receiving		
Merrimack	Passing		
Merrimack	Rushing		
Merrimack	Receiving		

=== at Fordham ===
Game Eleven – Merrimack Warriors (4–6) vs Fordham Rams (2–9) – Game summary

Quarter	1	2	3	4	Total
Warriors	9	0	7	3	19
Rams	0	3	0	0	3

at Coffey Field, Bronx, New York

- Date: Saturday November 23, 2024
- Game time: 1:00 PM
- Game weather: Cloudy,
- TV: ESPN+

Game information

First quarter
Second quarter
Third quarter
Fourth quarter

Statistics	MRMK	FOR
First downs	15	4
Total yards	357	31
Rushing yards	226	-29
Passing yards	131	60
Passing: Comp–Att–Int	12-15-0	3-12-2
Time of possession	38:14	21:46

Team	Category	Player	Statistics
Merrimack	Passing		
Merrimack	Rushing		
Merrimack	Receiving		
Fordham	Passing		
Fordham	Rushing		
Fordham	Receiving		
