= 2024 Fordham Rams football team =

American college football season

2024 Fordham Rams football
- Conference: Patriot League
- Record: 2–10 (2–4 Patriot)
- Head coach: Joe Conlin (7th season)
- Offensive coordinator: Art Asselta (2nd season)
- Defensive coordinator: Allen Gant (1st season)
- Home stadium: Coffey Field (Capacity: 7,000)

2024 Patriot League football standings
	Conf.			Overall
Team	W		L	W		L
No. 20 Lehigh +^	5	–	1	9	–	4
Holy Cross +	5	–	1	6	–	6
Bucknell	4	–	2	6	–	6
Lafayette	2	–	4	6	–	6
Georgetown	2	–	4	5	–	6
Fordham	2	–	4	2	–	10
Colgate	1	–	5	2	–	10
+ – Conference co-champions; ^ – FCS playoff participant; Rankings from STATS Poll

The 2024 Fordham Rams football team represented Fordham University as a member of the Patriot League during the 2024 NCAA Division I FCS football season. They were led by 7th-year head coach Joe Conlin, and played their home games at Coffey Field in The Bronx.

== Schedule ==
Date	Time	Opponent	Site	TV	Result	Attendance
August 29	7:00 p.m.	at Bowling Green*	Doyt Perry Stadium; Bowling Green, Ohio	ESPN+	L 17–41	12,786
September 7	6:00 p.m.	at Central Connecticut*	Arute Field; New Britain, Connecticut	NEC Front Row	L 3–33	3,784
September 14	1:00 p.m.	Stony Brook*^{†}	Coffey Field; Bronx, New York	ESPN+	L 21–27	3,112
September 21	1:00 p.m.	at Dartmouth*	Memorial Field; Hanover, New Hampshire	ESPN+	L 13–45	3,573
September 28	1:00 p.m.	at Monmouth*	Kessler Field; West Long Branch, New Jersey	FloSports	L 21-63	3,368
October 5	1:00 p.m.	Lafayette	Coffey Field; Bronx, New York	ESPN+	L 23–28	4,300
October 12	1:00 p.m.	at Holy Cross	Fitton Field; Worcester, Massachusetts (Ram–Crusader Cup)	ESPN+	L 16–19	10,223
October 26	12:00 p.m.	at Lehigh	Goodman Stadium; Bethlehem, Pennsylvania	ESPN+	L 19–33	3,428
November 2	1:00 p.m.	Colgate	Coffey Field; Bronx, New York	ESPN+	W 20–14	1,281
November 9	1:00 p.m.	at Bucknell	Christy Mathewson-Memorial Stadium; Lewisburg, Pennsylvania	ESPN+	L 27–28	881
November 16	1:00 p.m.	Georgetown	Coffey Field; Bronx, New York	ESPN+	W 31–3	1,117
November 23	1:00 p.m.	Merrimack*	Coffey Field; Bronx, New York	ESPN+	L 3–19	1,204
*Non-conference game; ^{†}Homecoming; All times are in Eastern time

== Game summaries ==
=== at Bowling Green (FBS) ===
Game One – Fordham Rams (0-0) at Bowling Green Falcons (FBS) (0-0) – Game summary

Quarter	1	2	3	4	Total
Rams	0	3	7	7	17
Falcons (FBS)	20	7	7	7	41

at Doyt Perry Stadium • Bowling Green, OH

- Date: Thursday, August 29, 2024
- Game time: 7:00 PM
- Game weather: Temperature: 82 °F (28 °C) • Wind: SE at 9 miles per hour (14 km/h) • Weather: Cloudy
- Game attendance: 12,786
- Referee: Rich Edwards
- TV announcers (ESPN+): Joey Lindstrom (play-by-play) and Ryan Cavanaugh (analyst)

Game information

First quarter

- 14:48 BGSU – Justin Pegues 100-yard kickoff return (Jackson Kleather kick failed) – Bowling Green 6–0.
- 8:20 BGSU – Terion Stewart 7-yard run (Jackson Kleather kick) – Bowling Green 13–0. Drive: 10 plays, 78 yards, 4:39.
- 0:09 BGSU – Lucian Anderson III 13-yard run (Jackson Kleather kick) – Bowling Green 20–0. Drive: 8 plays, 93 yards, 3:38.

Second quarter

- 9:54 BGSU – Connor Bazelak 8-yard run (Jackson Kleather kick) – Bowling Green 27–0. Drive: 8 plays, 38 yards, 4:10.
- 0:00 FORD – Bennett Henderson 24-yard field goal – Bowling Green 27–3. Drive: 13 plays, 74 yards, 5:16.

Third quarter

- 13:35 FORD – Cole Thornton 30-yard pass from C. J. Montes (Bennett Henderson kick) – Bowling Green 27–10. Drive: 4 plays, 75 yards, 1:25.
- 1:21 BGSU – Terion Stewart 7-yard run (Jackson Kleather kick) – Bowling Green 34–10. Drive: 13 plays, 94 yards, 5:34.

Fourth quarter

- 7:28 BGSU – Terion Stewart 73-yard run (Jackson Kleather kick) – Bowling Green 41–10. Drive: 3 plays, 86 yards, 1:23.
- 0:24 FORD – Jack Batten 60-yard pass from Jack Capaldi (Bennett Henderson kick) – Bowling Green 41–17. Drive: 7 plays, 95 yards, 2:24.

Statistics	FOR	BGSU
First downs	18	22
Total yards	401	475
Rushing yards	182	305
Passing yards	219	170
Passing: Comp–Att–Int	14–23–0	16–23–0
Time of possession	32:37	27:23

Team	Category	Player	Statistics
Fordham	Passing	C. J. Montes	13/21, 159 yards, TD
Fordham	Rushing	Julius Loughridge	16 carries, 112 yards
Fordham	Receiving	Julius Loughridge	4 receptions, 66 yards
Bowling Green	Passing	Connor Bazelak	15/22, 168 yards
Bowling Green	Rushing	Terion Stewart	14 carries, 161 yards, 3TD
Bowling Green	Receiving	Harold Fannin Jr.	6 receptions, 67 yards

=== at Central Connecticut ===
Game Two – Fordham Rams (0-1) at Central Connecticut Blue Devils (0-1) – Game summary

Quarter	1	2	3	4	Total
Rams	0	0	3	0	3
Blue Devils	0	19	14	0	33

at Arute Field • New Britain, CT

- Date: Saturday, September 7, 2024
- Game time: 6:00 PM
- Game weather: Rain, 60 °F (16 °C)
- Game attendance: 3,784
- Referee: Lance Carlen
- TV announcers (NEC Front Row): Bruce Biel (play-by-play) and Marc Robbins (analyst)

Game information

First quarter

No scoring plays

Second quarter

- (11:49) CCSU - Vincent Thomas 0-yard Fumble Return (Jack Barnum Kick) (Drive: 4 plays, -39 yards, 1:49; Central Connecticut 7-0)
- (6:55) CCSU - Elijah Howard 24-yard Run (Jack Barnum Kick) (Drive: 7 plays, 51 yards, 3:26; Central Connecticut 14-0)
- (1:15) CCSU - Team Safety (Drive: 3 plays, -16 yards, 0:50; Central Connecticut 16-0)
- (0:00) CCSU - Jack Barnum 30-yard Field Goal (Drive: 6 plays, 31 yards, 1:04; Central Connecticut 19-0)

Third quarter

- (8:48) FORD - Bennett Henderson 20-yard Field Goal (Drive: 11 plays, 52 yards, 4:16; Central Connecticut 19-3)
- (5:21) CCSU - Donny Marcus 18-yard pass from Brady Olson (Jack Barnum Kick) (Drive: 3 plays, 80 yards, 1:20; Central Connecticut 26-3)
- (0:42) CCSU - Eli Daniels 32-yard pass from Brady Olson (Jack Barnum Kick) (Drive: 5 plays, 47 yards, 3:06; Central Connecticut 33-3)

Fourth quarter

No scoring plays

Statistics	FOR	CCSU
First downs	11	16
Total yards	188	284
Rushing yards	47	61
Passing yards	141	223
Passing: Comp–Att–Int	17–36–2	15–31–0
Time of possession	29:27	30:33

Team	Category	Player	Statistics
Fordham	Passing	C. J. Montes	17/36, 141 yards
Fordham	Rushing	Julius Loughride	15 carries, 127 yards
Fordham	Receiving	Mekai Felton	4 receptions, 48 yards
Central Connecticut	Passing	Brady Olson	15/31, 223 yards, 2 TD, 2 INT
Central Connecticut	Rushing	Elijah Howard	19 carries, 50 yards, TD
Central Connecticut	Receiving	Sean O'Brien	2 receptions, 77 yards

=== Stony Brook ===
Game Three – Stony Brook Seawolves (1–1) vs Fordham Rams (0–2) – Game summary

Quarter	1	2	3	4	Total
Seawolves	0	17	0	10	27
Rams	7	7	7	0	21

at Coffey Field, Bronx, NY

- Date: Saturday September 14, 2024
- Game time: 1:00 PM
- Game weather: Sunny • Temperature: 80 °F (27 °C) • Wind: NE at 8 miles per hour (13 km/h)
- Game attendance: 3,112
- Referee: Eric Lewis
- TV announcers (ESPN+): Andrew Bogusch (play-by-play) and Grant DelVecchio (analyst)

Game information

First quarter

- (2:05) FOR – C. J. Montes 11-yard run, Bennett Henderson kick (Drive: 8 plays, 78 yards, 3:22; Fordham 7–0)

Second quarter

- (14:19) SBU – Enda Kirby 34-yard field goal (Drive: 7 plays, 53 yards, 2:41; Fordham 7–3)
- (9:23) SBU – Jayden Cook 7-yard pass from Tyler Knoop, Enda Kirby kick (Drive: 9 plays, 74 yards, 3:37; Stony Brook 10–7)
- (6:49) FOR – Peter Chalhoub 6-yard interception, Bennett Henderson kick (Fordham 14–10)
- (1:36) SBU – Roland Dempster 1-yard run, Enda Kirby kick (Drive: 13 plays, 75 yards, 5:13; Stony Brook 17–14)

Third quarter

- (8:53) FOR – Alex Kemper 55-yard interception, Bennett Henderson kick (Fordham 21–17)

Fourth quarter

- (12:37) SBU – Brandon Boria 6-yard run, Enda Kirby kick (Drive: 6 plays, 80 yards, 2:16; Stony Brook 24–21)
- (8:34) SBU – Enda Kirby 41-yard field goal (Drive: 4 plays, 5 yards, 2:03; Stony Brook 27–21)

Statistics	STBK	FOR
First downs	21	16
Total yards	432	257
Rushing yards	104	132
Passing yards	328	125
Passing: Comp–Att–Int	23–43–2	10–27–2
Time of possession	36:12	23:48

Team	Category	Player	Statistics
Stony Brook	Passing	Malachi Marshall	18/36, 268 yards, INT
Stony Brook	Rushing	Brandon Boria	14 carries, 65 yards, TD
Stony Brook	Receiving	R.J. Lamarre	7 receptions, 96 yards
Fordham	Passing	Jack Capaldi	6/18, 92 yards, 2 INT
Fordham	Rushing	Julius Loughridge	13 carries, 99 yards
Fordham	Receiving	K.J. Reed	3 receptions, 65 yards

=== at Dartmouth ===
Game Four – Fordham Rams (0–3) at Dartmouth Big Green (0–0) – Game summary

Quarter	1	2	3	4	Total
Rams	0	0	0	0	0
Big Green	0	0	0	0	0

at Memorial Field • Hanover, NH

- Date: Saturday September 21, 2024
- Game time: 1:00 PM EST
- Game weather: 0 °F (−18 °C)
- TV announcers (ESPN+): TBD

Game information

First quarter
Second quarter
Third quarter
Fourth quarter

Statistics	FOR	DART
First downs		
Total yards		
Rushing yards		
Passing yards		
Passing: Comp–Att–Int		
Time of possession		

Team	Category	Player	Statistics
Fordham	Passing		
Fordham	Rushing		
Fordham	Receiving		
Dartmouth	Passing		
Dartmouth	Rushing		
Dartmouth	Receiving		

=== at Monmouth ===
Game Five – Fordham Rams (0–4) at Monmouth Hawks (2–2) – Game summary

Quarter	1	2	3	4	Total
Rams	7	7	0	7	21
Hawks	14	35	14	0	63

at Kessler Field • West Long Branch, NJ

- Date: Saturday September 28, 2024
- Game time: 1:00 PM EST
- Game weather: Rain, 68 °F (20 °C), Wind: SE @ 20 mph
- Game attendance: 3,368
- Referee: Antonio Marcella
- TV announcers (FloSports): Matt Harmon (play-by-play) and Emory Hunt (analyst)

Game information

First quarter

- (14:46) MONM – Makhi Green 100-yard kickoff return (Michael Calton Jr. kick) (Drive: 13 plays, 72 yards, 6:01; Monmouth 7-0)
- (08:45) FOR – Julius Loughridge 9-yard run (Bennett Henderson kick) (Drive: 13 plays, 72 yards, 6:01; 7-7)
- (03:13) MONM – Sone Ntoh 1-yard run (Michael Calton Jr. kick) (Drive: 11 plays, 87 yards, 5:32; Monmouth 14-7)

Second quarter

- (14:07) MONM – Sone Ntoh 3-yard run (Michael Calton Jr. kick) (Drive: 10 plays, 70 yards, 2:58; Monmouth 21-7)
- (10:45) MONM – Rodney Nelson 26-yard run (Michael Calton Jr. kick) (Drive: 4 plays, 73 yards, 1:29; Monmouth 28-7)
- (09:48) MONM – Sone Ntoh 64-yard run (Michael Calton Jr. kick) (Drive: 1 play, 64 yards, 0:10; Monmouth 35-7)
- (04:57) FOR – Julius Loughridge 8-yard run (Bennett Henderson kick) (Drive: 10 plays, 75 yards, 4:51; Monmouth 35-14)
- (04:44) MONM – TJ Speight 79-yard kickoff return (Michael Calton Jr. kick) (Drive: 3 plays, 6 yards, 1:31; Monmouth 42-14)
- (00;33) MONM – Sone Ntoh 7-yard run (Michael Calton Jr. kick) (Drive: 6 plays, 57 yards, 2:40; Monmouth 49-14)

Third quarter

- (11:41) MONM – Tra Neal 27-yard pass from Derek Robertson (Michael Calton Jr. kick) (Drive: 5 play, 45 yards, 2:31; Monmouth 56-14)
- (04:50) MONM – Sone Ntoh 2-yard run (Michael Calton Jr. kick) (Drive: 6 play, 53 yards, 3:15; Monmouth 63-14)

Fourth quarter

- (12:40) FOR – Jack Freeburg 35-yard pass from Jack Capaldi (Bennett Henderson kick) (Drive: 10 plays, 80 yards, 3:41; Monmouth 63-21)

Statistics	FOR	MONM
First downs	18	24
Total yards	278	581
Rushing yards	180	407
Passing yards	98	174
Passing: Comp–Att–Int	11–23–0	12–15–0
Time of possession	28:31	31:29

Team	Category	Player	Statistics
Fordham	Passing	Jack Capaldi	11/23, 98 yards, TD
Fordham	Rushing	Julius Loughridge	24 carries, 97 yards, 2 TD
Fordham	Receiving	Jack Freeburg	1 receptions, 35 yards, TD
Monmouth	Passing	Derek Robertson	11/14, 180 yards, TD
Monmouth	Rushing	Sone Ntoh	15 carries, 136 yards, 5 TD
Monmouth	Receiving	Gavin Nelson	3 receptions, 62 yards

=== Lafayette ===
Game Six – Lafayette Leopards (2–2) vs Fordham Rams (0–5) – Game summary

Quarter	1	2	3	4	Total
Leopards	0	0	0	0	0
Rams	0	0	0	0	0

at Coffey Field, Bronx, NY

- Date: Saturday October 5, 2024
- Game time: 1:00 PM
- TV announcers (ESPN+): TBD

Game information

First quarter
Second quarter
Third quarter
Fourth quarter

Statistics	LAF	FOR
First downs		
Total yards		
Rushing yards		
Passing yards		
Passing: Comp–Att–Int		
Time of possession		

Team	Category	Player	Statistics
Lafayette	Passing		
Lafayette	Rushing		
Lafayette	Receiving		
Fordham	Passing		
Fordham	Rushing		
Fordham	Receiving		

=== at Holy Cross (Ram–Crusader Cup) ===
Game Seven – Fordham Rams (0–6) vs Holy Cross Crusaders (2–4) – Game summary

Quarter	1	2	3	4	Total
Rams	0	0	0	0	0
Crusaders	0	0	0	0	0

at Fitton Field • Worcester, MA

- Date: Saturday October 12, 2024
- Game time: 1:00 p.m.
- Game weather: 0 °F (−18 °C)
- TV: ESPN+

Game information

First quarter
Second quarter
Third quarter
Fourth quarter

Statistics	FOR	HC
First downs		
Total yards		
Rushing yards		
Passing yards		
Passing: Comp–Att–Int		
Time of possession		

Team	Category	Player	Statistics
Fordham	Passing		
Fordham	Rushing		
Fordham	Receiving		
Holy Cross	Passing		
Holy Cross	Rushing		
Holy Cross	Receiving		

=== at Lehigh ===
Game Eight – Fordham Rams (0–7) vs Lehigh Mountain Hawks (3–3) – Game summary

Quarter	1	2	3	4	Total
Rams	0	0	0	0	0
Mountain Hawks	0	0	0	0	0

at Goodman Stadium • Bethlehem, PA

- Date: Saturday October 26, 2024
- Game time: 12:00 p.m.
- Game weather: 0 °F (−18 °C)
- TV: ESPN+

Game information

First quarter
Second quarter
Third quarter
Fourth quarter

Statistics	FOR	LEH
First downs		
Total yards		
Rushing yards		
Passing yards		
Passing: Comp–Att–Int		
Time of possession		

Team	Category	Player	Statistics
Fordham	Passing		
Fordham	Rushing		
Fordham	Receiving		
Lehigh	Passing		
Lehigh	Rushing		
Lehigh	Receiving		

=== Colgate ===
Game Nine – Colgate Raiders (2–6) at Fordham Rams (0–8) – Game summary

Quarter	1	2	3	4	Total
Raiders	0	0	0	0	0
Rams	0	0	0	0	0

at Coffey Field • Bronx, NY

- Date: Saturday November 2, 2024
- Game time: 1:00 p.m.
- Game weather: 0 °F (−18 °C)
- TV: ESPN+

Game information

First quarter
Second quarter
Third quarter
Fourth quarter

Statistics	COLG	FOR
First downs		
Total yards		
Rushing yards		
Passing yards		
Passing: Comp–Att–Int		
Time of possession		

Team	Category	Player	Statistics
Colgate	Passing		
Colgate	Rushing		
Colgate	Receiving		
Fordham	Passing		
Fordham	Rushing		
Fordham	Receiving		

=== at Bucknell ===
Game Ten – Fordham Rams (1–8) vs Bucknell Bison (4–5) – Game summary

Quarter	1	2	3	4	Total
Rams	0	0	0	0	0
Bison	0	0	0	0	0

at Christy Mathewson-Memorial Stadium • Lewisburg, PA

- Date: Saturday November 9, 2024
- Game time: 1:00 p.m.
- Game weather: 0 °F (−18 °C)
- TV: ESPN+

Game information

First quarter
Second quarter
Third quarter
Fourth quarter

Statistics	FOR	BUCK
First downs		
Total yards		
Rushing yards		
Passing yards		
Passing: Comp–Att–Int		
Time of possession		

Team	Category	Player	Statistics
Fordham	Passing		
Fordham	Rushing		
Fordham	Receiving		
Bucknell	Passing		
Bucknell	Rushing		
Bucknell	Receiving		

=== Georgetown ===
Game Eleven – Georgetown Hoyas (5–4) at Fordham Rams (0–0) – Game summary

Quarter	1	2	3	4	Total
Hoyas	0	3	0	0	3
Rams	14	3	7	7	31

at Coffey Field • Bronx, NY

- Date: Saturday November 16, 2024
- Game time: 1:00 p.m.
- Game weather: 0 °F (−18 °C)
- Game attendance: 1,117
- TV: ESPN+

Game information

First quarter

- FOR – Julius Loughridge 2 Yd Run (Bennett Henderson Kick), 8:21. Rams 7–0
- FOR – Jeff Ciccio 5 Yd pass from Jack Capaldi (Bennett Henderson Kick), 0:08. Rams 14–0

Second quarter

- FOR – Bennett Henderson 28 Yd Field Goal, 12:09. Rams 17–0
- GTWN – Patrick Ryan 18 Yd Field Goal, 5:22. Rams 17–3

Third quarter

- FOR – KJ Reed 12 Yd pass from Jack Capaldi (Bennett Henderson Kick), 00:02. Rams 24–3

Fourth quarter

- FOR – Alex Kemper 63 Yd Interception Return (Bennett Henderson Kick), 07:24. Rams 31–3

Statistics	GTWN	FOR
First downs	18	19
Total yards	358	395
Rushing yards	74	173
Passing yards	284	222
Passing: Comp–Att–Int	22−41−2	12−25−1
Time of possession	32:20	27:40

Team	Category	Player	Statistics
Georgetown	Passing	Jacob Holtschlag	19/34, 253 yards, 2 INTs
Georgetown	Rushing	Bryce Cox	9 carries, 47 yards
Georgetown	Receiving	Cam Pygatt	7 receptions, 135 yards
Fordham	Passing	Jack Capaldi	12/25, 222 yards, 2 TDs, 1 INT
Fordham	Rushing	Julius Loughridge	16 carries, 91 yards, 1 TD
Fordham	Receiving	Nodin Tracy	3 receptions, 97 yards

=== Merrimack ===
Game Twelve – Merrimack Warriors (4–6) at Fordham Rams (2–9) – Game summary

Quarter	1	2	3	4	Total
Warriors	0	0	0	0	0
Rams	0	0	0	0	0

at Coffey Field • Bronx, NY

- Date: Saturday November 23, 2024
- Game time: 1:00 p.m.
- Game weather: 0 °F (−18 °C)
- TV: ESPN+

Game information

First quarter
Second quarter
Third quarter
Fourth quarter

Statistics	MRMK	FOR
First downs		
Total yards		
Rushing yards		
Passing yards		
Passing: Comp–Att–Int		
Time of possession		

Team	Category	Player	Statistics
Merrimack	Passing		
Merrimack	Rushing		
Merrimack	Receiving		
Fordham	Passing		
Fordham	Rushing		
Fordham	Receiving		
