= Paraclete High School =

Private Roman Catholic school in California

Location
- 42145 30th St. West; Lancaster, Los Angeles County, California 93536; United States; 34°38′53″N 118°11′2″W

Information
- Type: Private, Coeducational, College Prep
- Motto: "Veni, Lumen Cordium" ("Come, Light of the Heart.")
- Religious affiliation: Roman Catholic
- Established: 1963
- Chaplain: Unknown
- Faculty: 68
- Teaching staff: 42
- Grades: 9–12
- Average class size: 30 or less
- Colors: Scarlet and gold
- Athletics: varsity football, JV football, varsity girls' volleyball, girls' JV volleyball, boys' cross country, girls' cross country, varsity boys' soccer, JV boys' soccer, varsity girls' soccer, JV girls' soccer, varsity boys' basketball, JV boys' basketball, varsity girls' basketball, JV girls' basketball, track, varsity baseball, JV baseball, varsity softball, JV softball, boys' varsity volleyball, JV boys' volleyball, golf, varsity cheer, JV cheer, eSports, tennis, swimming
- Athletics conference: CIF Southern Section; Gold Coast League
- Nickname: Spirits
- Accreditation: Western Association of Schools and Colleges, Western Catholic Educational Association
- Publication: "PHSpirit"
- Newspaper: Clete News
- Dean of Boys: Arthur Lopez
- Dean of Girls: Annette Olague
- Athletic Director: Rick Bruce
- Activities Director: Troy Miller
- Website: www.paracletehs.org

Paraclete High School is a private Roman Catholic college preparatory high school in Lancaster, California, United States, affiliated with the Roman Catholic Archdiocese of Los Angeles. It was established in 1963. On May 24, 2011, Paraclete graduated its largest class yet with the Class of 2011, reaching 203 students.

== Background ==
Paraclete was established in 1963 on the old Antelope Valley Fairgrounds on Avenue I. Paraclete held its first classes in September 1963, with 41 students and 3 faculty members. A year later freshmen and sophomores were welcomed to new classrooms on its current property. The school was officially dedicated on November 6, 1965, by Cardinal McIntyre. Paraclete held its first graduation in June 1967.

== Academics ==
The curriculum at Paraclete is college preparatory, giving special attention to meeting the UC admissions requirements. Each student is required to attend at least 6 classes a day, but students who wish can take an extra zero period class before school starts or after school. Paraclete offers 13 AP classes and many Pre AP and honors courses. Being a Catholic high school, Paraclete also requires 4 years of religion classes. Any student that maintains a 4.0 or higher GPA is eligible to be valedictorian during their senior graduation.

== Community service ==
Because Paraclete is a Catholic high school, every student and their parents are required to do community service. Freshmen and sophomores are required to do ten hours of community service or 2 service projects every semester, while juniors and seniors are required to do 15 hours of community service or 3 service projects every semester. Paraclete also has many clubs that are community service-oriented, examples are Z Club and Key Club. The school holds two blood drives every year; many students and faculty donate blood.

== Notable alumni ==
- Todd Davis, NFL player
- Joey Estes, MLB Pitcher
- Noah Gray-Cabey, actor, pianist
- C. J. Montes, college football quarterback
- Darian Thompson, NFL player
