= 2024 Lafayette Leopards football team =

American college football season

2024 Lafayette Leopards football
- Conference: Patriot League
- Record: 6–6 (2–4 Patriot)
- Head coach: John Troxell (3rd season)
- Offensive coordinator: T. J. Dimuzio (3rd season)
- Defensive coordinator: Mike Saint Germain (3rd season)
- Home stadium: Fisher Stadium

2024 Patriot League football standings
	Conf.			Overall
Team	W		L	W		L
No. 20 Lehigh +^	5	–	1	9	–	4
Holy Cross +	5	–	1	6	–	6
Bucknell	4	–	2	6	–	6
Lafayette	2	–	4	6	–	6
Georgetown	2	–	4	5	–	6
Fordham	2	–	4	2	–	10
Colgate	1	–	5	2	–	10
+ – Conference co-champions; ^ – FCS playoff participant; Rankings from STATS Poll

The 2024 Lafayette Leopards football team represented Lafayette College as a member of the Patriot League during the 2024 NCAA Division I FCS football season. The Leopards were led by third-year head coach John Troxell and played their home games at Fisher Stadium in Easton, Pennsylvania.

== Schedule ==
Date	Time	Opponent	Rank	Site	TV	Result	Attendance
August 29	7:00 p.m.	at Buffalo*	No. 17	University at Buffalo Stadium; Amherst, NY	ESPN+	L 13–30	16,400
September 7	12:00 p.m.	at Monmouth*	No. 19	Kessler Field; West Long Branch, NJ	FloSports	W 40–35	N/A
September 14	12:30 p.m.	Marist*	No. 19	Fisher Stadium; Easton, PA	ESPN+	W 56–14	4,418
September 21	12:00 p.m.	at Columbia*	No. 18	Robert K. Kraft Field at Lawrence A. Wien Stadium; New York, NY	ESPN+	L 20–31	3,592
October 5	1:00 p.m.	at Fordham		Coffey Field; Bronx, NY	ESPN+	W 28–23	4,300
October 12	12:30 p.m.	Georgetown		Fisher Stadium; Easton, PA	ESPN+	L 0–17	3,295
October 19	12:30 p.m.	Sacred Heart*		Fisher Stadium; Easton, PA	ESPN+	W 31–17	3,217
October 26	1:30 p.m.	Holy Cross^{†}		Fisher Stadium; Easton, PA	ESPN+	L 28–34	5,774
November 2	1:00 p.m.	at Bucknell		Christy Mathewson-Memorial Stadium; Lewisburg, PA	ESPN+	L 14–21	808
November 9	1:00 p.m.	at Colgate		Andy Kerr Stadium; Hamilton, NY	ESPN+	W 21–20	1,208
November 16	12:30 p.m.	Stonehill*		Fisher Stadium; Easton, PA	ESPN+	W 42–10	2,856
November 23	12:00 p.m.	at Lehigh		Goodman Stadium; Bethlehem, PA (The Rivalry)	ESPN+	L 14–38	15,097
*Non-conference game; ^{†}Homecoming; Rankings from STATS Poll released prior to the game; All times are in Eastern time

== Game summaries ==
=== at Buffalo (FBS) ===
Game One – No. 17 Lafayette Leopards (0–0) at Buffalo Bulls (FBS) (0-0) – Game summary

Quarter	1	2	3	4	Total
No. 17 Leopards	0	0	6	7	13
Bulls (FBS)	13	3	7	7	30

at UB Stadium • Amherst, NY

- Date: Thursday, August 29, 2024
- Game time: 7:00 PM
- Game attendance: 16,400
- Referee: Jeremy Valentine
- TV announcers (ESPN+): Anthony Lima (play-by-play) and Jordan Reid (analyst)

Game information

First quarter

- (9:02) BUFF – Al-Jay Henderson 11-yard run (run failed) (Drive: 10 plays, 60 yards, 2:59; Buffalo 6-0)
- (3:17) BUFF – Nik McMillan 31-yard pass from C.J. Ogbonna (Nick Reed kick) (Drive: 5 plays, 48 yards, 2:04; Buffalo 13-0)

Second quarter

- (9:23) BUFF – Nick Reed 22-yard field goal (Drive: 8 plays, 49 yards, 2:55; Buffalo 16-0)

Third quarter

- (10:09) LAF – Dallas Holmes 18-yard pass from Carson Persing (pass failed) (Drive: 2 plays, 18 yards, 0:06; Buffalo 16-6)
- (6:10) BUFF – Taji Johnson 32-yard pass from C.J. Ogbonna (Nick Reed kick) (Drive: 8 plays, 75 yards, 2:23; Buffalo 23-6)

Fourth quarter

- (10:12) LAF – Chris Carasia 13-yard pass from Dean DeNobile (Jack Simonetta kick) (Drive: 11 plays, 66 yards, 4:02; Buffalo 23-13)
- (5:25) BUFF – Jacqez Barksdale 19-yard run (Nick Reed kick) (Drive: 1 play, 19 yards, 0:06; Buffalo 30-13)

Statistics	LAF	UB
First downs	14	23
Total yards	63–225	69–403
Rushing yards	28–45	45–208
Passing yards	180	195
Passing: Comp–Att–Int	24–35–2	14–24–0
Time of possession	28:47	31:13

Team	Category	Player	Statistics
Lafayette	Passing	Dean DeNobile	23/33, 162 yards, TD, 2 INT
Lafayette	Rushing	Troy Bruce	4 carries, 29 yards
Lafayette	Receiving	Chris Carasia	8 receptions, 83 yards, TD
Buffalo	Passing	C. J. Ogbonna	14/24, 195 yards, 2 TD
Buffalo	Rushing	Jacqez Barksdale	14 carries, 99 yards, TD
Buffalo	Receiving	Nik McMillan	5 receptions, 76 yards, TD

=== at Monmouth ===
Game Two – No. 19 Lafayette Leopards (0–1) at Monmouth Hawks (0–1) – Game summary

Quarter	1	2	3	4	Total
No. 19 Leopards	7	7	7	19	40
Hawks	7	7	0	21	35

at Kessler Field • West Long Branch, NJ

- Date: Saturday September 7, 2024
- Game time: 12:00 PM EST
- Game weather: Cloudy, 73 °F (23 °C)
- Game attendance: 2,504
- Referee: Justin Ackley
- TV announcers (FloSports): Matt Harmon (play-by-play) and Emory Hunt (analyst)

Game information

First quarter

- (12:16) LAF – Jamar Curtis 9-yard run (Jack Simonetta kick) (Drive: 11 plays, 83 yards, 3:52; Lafayette 7-0)
- (03:06) MONM – Josh Derry 23-yard pass from Derek Robertson (Michael Calton Jr. kick) (Drive: 7 plays, 75 yards, 3:53; 7-7)

Second quarter

- (13:01) LAF – Troy Bruce 6-yard (Jack Simonetta kick) (Drive: 13 plays, 75 yards, 5:05; Lafayette 14-7)
- (06:34) MONM – Max James 5-yard pass from Derek Robertson (Michael Calton Jr. kick) (Drive: 13 plays, 81 yards, 6:21; 14-14)

Third quarter

- (07:19) LAF – Jamar Curtis 2-yard run (Jack Simonetta kick) (Drive: 16 plays, 75 yards, 7:41; Lafayette 21-14)

Fourth quarter

- (14:50) MONM – Tra Neal 2-yard pass from Derek Robertson (Michael Calton Jr. kick) (Drive: 14 plays, 78 yards, 7:23; 21-21)
- (11:20) MONM – TJ Speight 89-yard pass from Derek Robertson (Michael Calton Jr. kick) (Drive: 1 play, 89 yards, 0:13; Monmouth 28-21)
- (06:25) LAF – Jamar Curtis 2-yard run (Jack Simonetta kick) (Drive: 11 plays, 75 yards, 4:49; 28-28)
- (01:54) MONM – Sone Ntoh 17-yard run (Michael Calton Jr. kick) (Drive: 10 plays, 80 yards, 4:24; Monmouth 35-28)
- (00:53) LAF – Chris Carasia 12-yard pass from Dean DeNobile (Two-point pass conversion failed) (Drive: 4 plays, 81 yards, 0:59; Monmouth 35-34)
- (00:36) LAF – Elijah Steward 42-yard pass from Dean DeNobile (Two-point pass conversion failed) (Drive: 2 plays, 51 yards, 0:15; Lafayette 40-35)

Statistics	LAF	MONM
First downs	29	21
Total yards	526	429
Rushing yards	132	74
Passing yards	394	355
Passing: Comp–Att–Int	31–45–0	24–36–2
Time of possession	33:33	26:27

Team	Category	Player	Statistics
Lafayette	Passing	Dean DeNobile	31/45, 394 yards, 2 TD
Lafayette	Rushing	Jamar Curtis	21 carries, 87 yards, 3 TD
Lafayette	Receiving	Elijah Steward	15 receptions, 244 yards, TD
Monmouth	Passing	Derek Robertson	24/36, 355 yards, 4 TD, 2 INT
Monmouth	Rushing	Sone Ntoh	10 carries, 50 yards, TD
Monmouth	Receiving	TJ Speight	3 receptions, 97 yards, TD

=== Marist ===
Game Three – Marist Red Foxes (0–1) at No. 19 Lafayette Leopards (1–1) – Game summary

Quarter	1	2	3	4	Total
Red Foxes	7	0	0	7	14
No. 19 Leopards	14	21	21	0	56

at Fisher Stadium • Easton, Pennsylvania

- Date: Saturday September 14, 2024
- Game time: 12:30 PM
- Game weather: Sunny, 77 °F (25 °C)
- Game attendance: 4,418
- TV: ESPN+

Game information

First quarter
Second quarter
Third quarter
Fourth quarter

Statistics	MRST	LAF
First downs	9	25
Total yards	170	528
Rushing yards	43	244
Passing yards	127	284
Passing: Comp–Att–Int	20-37-2	21-26-0
Time of possession	22:35	37:25

Team	Category	Player	Statistics
Marist	Passing	Sonny Mannino	6/10, 78 yards, TD
Marist	Rushing	Tristan Shannon	4 carries, 35 yards
Marist	Receiving	Jack Rilling	4 receptions, 58 yards
Lafayette	Passing	Dean DeNobile	20/23, 241, TD
Lafayette	Rushing	Jamar Curtis	12 carries, 88 yards, 3 TD
Lafayette	Receiving	Elijah Steward	6 receptions, 102 yards, TD

=== at Columbia ===
Game Four – No. 18 Lafayette Leopards (2–1) vs Columbia Lions (0–0) – Game summary

Quarter	1	2	3	4	Total
No. 18 Leopards	0	0	0	0	0
Lions	0	0	0	0	0

at Robert K. Kraft Field at Lawrence A. Wien Stadium, New York, NY

- Date: Saturday September 21, 2024
- Game time: 12:00 PM
- TV announcers (ESPN+): TBD

Game information

First quarter
Second quarter
Third quarter
Fourth quarter

Statistics	LAF	COLU
First downs		
Total yards		
Rushing yards		
Passing yards		
Passing: Comp–Att–Int		
Time of possession		

Team	Category	Player	Statistics
Lafayette	Passing		
Lafayette	Rushing		
Lafayette	Receiving		
Columbia	Passing		
Columbia	Rushing		
Columbia	Receiving		

=== at Fordham ===
Game Five – Lafayette Leopards (2–2) vs Fordham Rams (0–5) – Game summary

Quarter	1	2	3	4	Total
Leopards	0	0	0	0	0
Rams	0	0	0	0	0

at Coffey Field, Bronx, NY

- Date: Saturday October 5, 2024
- Game time: 1:00 PM
- TV announcers (ESPN+): TBD

Game information

First quarter
Second quarter
Third quarter
Fourth quarter

Statistics	LAF	FOR
First downs		
Total yards		
Rushing yards		
Passing yards		
Passing: Comp–Att–Int		
Time of possession		

Team	Category	Player	Statistics
Lafayette	Passing		
Lafayette	Rushing		
Lafayette	Receiving		
Fordham	Passing		
Fordham	Rushing		
Fordham	Receiving		

=== Georgetown ===
Game Six – Georgetown Hoyas (3–2) at Lafayette Leopards (3–2) – Game summary

Quarter	1	2	3	4	Total
Hoyas	3	7	7	0	17
Leopards	0	0	0	0	0

at Fisher Stadium • Easton, Pennsylvania

- Date: Saturday October 12, 2024
- Game time: 12:30 PM
- Game weather: Sunny • Temperature: 70 °F (21 °C) • Wind: NW 11 mph
- Game attendance: 3,295
- Referee: Todd Boyd
- TV: ESPN+

Game information

First quarter

- GTWN – Patrick Ryan 26 Yd Field Goal, 4:26. Hoyas 3–0. Drive: 12 plays, 51 yards, 5:29.

Second quarter

- GTWN – Savion Hart 1 Yd Run (Patrick Ryan Kick), 1:02. Hoyas 10–0. Drive: 14 plays, 66 yards, 7:17.

Third quarter

- GTWN – Udechukwu Enyerlbe 24 Yd Run (Patrick Ryan Kick), 7:45. Hoyas 17–0. Drive: 1 play, 24 yards, 0:06.

Fourth quarter

No scoring plays

Statistics	GTWN	LAF
First downs	17	13
Total yards	289	236
Rushing yards	189	69
Passing yards	100	167
Passing: Comp–Att–Int	12−25−1	10−38−4
Time of possession	39:18	20:42

Team	Category	Player	Statistics
Georgetown	Passing	Danny Lauter	12/25, 100 yards, 1 INT
Georgetown	Rushing	Bryce Cox	19 carries, 74 yards
Georgetown	Receiving	Jimmy Kibble	3 receptions, 42 yards
Lafayette	Passing	Dean DeNobile	10/38, 167 yards, 4 INTs
Lafayette	Rushing	Jamar Curtis	14 carries, 53 yards
Lafayette	Receiving	Elijah Steward	4 receptions, 79 yards

=== Sacred Heart ===
Game Seven – Sacred Heart Pioneers (3–4) at Lafayette Leopards (3–3) – Game summary

Quarter	1	2	3	4	Total
Pioneers	7	7	3	0	17
Leopards	14	10	0	7	31

at Fisher Stadium • Easton, Pennsylvania

- Date: Saturday October 19, 2024
- Game time: 12:30 PM
- Game weather: Sunny • Temperature: 65 °F (18 °C) • Wind: S 3mph
- Game attendance: 3,217
- Referee: Anthony Florio
- TV: ESPN+

Game information

First quarter

- (08:44) LAF - Jamar Curtis 1 yd run (Jack Simonetta kick), (Drive 12 plays, 70 yards, 05:01; 7-0 Lafayette)
- (04:50) SHU - Jalen Madison 6 yd run (Matt Kling kick), (Drive 8 plays, 86 yards, 03:54; 7-7 Tied
- (00:54) LAF - Troy Bruce 5 yd run (Jack Simonetta kick), (Drive 3 plays, 28 yards, 01:00; 14-7 Lafayette)

Second quarter

- (12:00) LAF - Jamar Curtis 2 yd run (Jack Simonetta kick), (Drive 7 plays, 46 yards, 03:32; 21-7 Lafayette)
- (07:07) SHU - Jalen Madison 27 yd run (Matt Kling kick), (Drive 9 plays, 78 yards, 04:53; 21-14 Lafayette)
- (01:51) LAF - Jack Simonetta 23 yd field goal, (Drive 13 plays, 63 yards, 05:16; 24-14 Lafayette)

Third quarter

- (09:30) SHU - Matt Kling 42 yd field goal, (Drive 9 plays, 43 yards, 03:58 24-17 Lafayette)

Fourth quarter

- (10:28) LAF - Dean DeNobile 1 yd run (Jack Simonetta kick), (Drive 14 plays, 89 yards, 07:06; 31-17 Lafayette)

Statistics	SHU	LAF
First downs	20	20
Total yards	309	381
Rushing yards	165	297
Passing yards	144	84
Passing: Comp–Att–Int	13–27–0	9–15–1
Time of possession	27:21	32:39

Team	Category	Player	Statistics
Sacred Heart	Passing	John Michalski	13/26, 144 yards
Sacred Heart	Rushing	Jalen Madison	17 carries, 91 yards, 2 TDs
Sacred Heart	Receiving	Kevin McGuire	1 reception, 42 yards
Lafayette	Passing	Dean DeNobile	9/15, 84 yards, INT
Lafayette	Rushing	Jamar Curtis	27 carries, 156 yards, 2 TDs
Lafayette	Receiving	Jamar Curtis	5 receptions, 42 yards

=== Holy Cross ===
Game Eight – Holy Cross Crusaders (3–5) at Lafayette Leopards (4–3) – Game summary

Quarter	1	2	3	4	Total
Crusaders	0	0	0	0	0
Leopards	0	0	0	0	0

at Fisher Stadium • Easton, Pennsylvania

- Date: Saturday October 26, 2024
- Game time: 1:30 PM
- Game weather: 0 °F (−18 °C)
- TV: ESPN+

Game information

First quarter
Second quarter
Third quarter
Fourth quarter

Statistics	HC	LAF
First downs		
Total yards		
Rushing yards		
Passing yards		
Passing: Comp–Att–Int		
Time of possession		

Team	Category	Player	Statistics
Holy Cross	Passing		
Holy Cross	Rushing		
Holy Cross	Receiving		
Lafayette	Passing		
Lafayette	Rushing		
Lafayette	Receiving		

=== at Bucknell ===
Game Nine – Lafayette Leopards (4–4) vs Bucknell Bison (3–5) – Game summary

Quarter	1	2	3	4	Total
Leopards	0	0	0	0	0
Bison	0	0	0	0	0

at Christy Mathewson-Memorial Stadium, Lewisburg, PA

- Date: Saturday November 2, 2024
- Game time: 1:00 PM
- TV announcers (ESPN+): TBD

Game information

First quarter
Second quarter
Third quarter
Fourth quarter

Statistics	LAF	BUCK
First downs		
Total yards		
Rushing yards		
Passing yards		
Passing: Comp–Att–Int		
Time of possession		

Team	Category	Player	Statistics
Lafayette	Passing		
Lafayette	Rushing		
Lafayette	Receiving		
Bucknell	Passing		
Bucknell	Rushing		
Bucknell	Receiving		

=== at Colgate ===
Game Ten – Lafayette Leopards (4–5) at Colgate Raiders (2–7) – Game summary

Quarter	1	2	3	4	Total
Leopards	0	0	0	0	0
Raiders	0	0	0	0	0

at Andy Kerr Stadium • Hamilton, NY

- Date: Saturday November 9, 2024
- Game time: 1:00 p.m.
- Game weather: 0 °F (−18 °C)
- TV: ESPN+

Game information

First quarter
Second quarter
Third quarter
Fourth quarter

Statistics	LAF	COLG
First downs		
Total yards		
Rushing yards		
Passing yards		
Passing: Comp–Att–Int		
Time of possession		

Team	Category	Player	Statistics
Lafayette	Passing		
Lafayette	Rushing		
Lafayette	Receiving		
Colgate	Passing		
Colgate	Rushing		
Colgate	Receiving		

=== Stonehill ===
Game Eleven – Stonehill Skyhawks (1–8) at Lafayette Leopards (5–5) – Game summary

Quarter	1	2	3	4	Total
Skyhawks	0	0	0	0	0
Leopards	0	0	0	0	0

at Fisher Stadium • Easton, Pennsylvania

- Date: Saturday November 16, 2024
- Game time: 12:30 PM
- Game weather: 0 °F (−18 °C)
- TV: ESPN+

Game information

First quarter
Second quarter
Third quarter
Fourth quarter

Statistics	STO	LAF
First downs		
Total yards		
Rushing yards		
Passing yards		
Passing: Comp–Att–Int		
Time of possession		

Team	Category	Player	Statistics
Stonehill	Passing		
Stonehill	Rushing		
Stonehill	Receiving		
Lafayette	Passing		
Lafayette	Rushing		
Lafayette	Receiving		

=== at Lehigh (The Rivalry) ===
Game Twelve – Lafayette Leopards (6–5) vs Lehigh Mountain Hawks (7–3) – Game summary

Quarter	1	2	3	4	Total
Leopards	7	0	7	0	14
Mountain Hawks	7	21	3	7	38

at Goodman Stadium, Bethlehem, PA

- Date: Saturday November 23, 2024
- Game time: 12:00 PM
- Game weather: Sunny
- Game attendance: 15,097
- Referee: Todd Boyd
- TV announcers (ESPN+): Marco Socci (play-by-play) and Mike Yadush (analyst)

Game information

First quarter

- (9:47) LEH - Jaden Green 19 yard run, Nick Garrido kick (Drive: 9 plays, 69 yards, 5:03 Lehigh 7-0)
- (5:15) LAF - Jamar Curtis 9 yard run, Jack Simonetta kick (Drive: 9 plays, 82 yards, 4:26 Tied 7-7)

Second quarter

- (12:26) LEH - Matt Machalik 1 yard run, Nick Garrido kick (Drive: 8 plays, 68 yards, 4:44 Lehigh 14-7)
- (6:53) LEH - Mason Humphrey 23 yard pass from Hayden Johnson, Nick Garrido kick (Drive: 6 plays, 59 yards, 3:08 Lehigh 21-7)
- (0:01) LEH - Hayden Johnson 5 yard run, Nick Garrido kick (Drive: 6 plays, 80 yards, 1:00 Lehigh 28-7)

Third quarter

- (11:31) LAF - Jamar Curtis 2 yard run, Jack Simonetta kick (Drive: 10 plays, 76 yards, 4:32 Lehigh 28-14)
- (2:02) LEH - Nick Garrido 31 yard field goal (Drive: 14 plays, 54 yards, 8:10 Lehigh 31-14)

Fourth quarter

- (7:30) LEH - Mason Moore 41 yard interception return, Nick Garrido kick (Drive: 3 plays, 80 yards, 0:54 Lehigh 38-14)

Statistics	LAF	LEH
First downs	19	25
Total yards	283	344
Rushing yards	112	229
Passing yards	171	115
Passing: Comp–Att–Int	20–25–2	10–13–1
Time of possession	27:59	32:01

Team	Category	Player	Statistics
Lafayette	Passing	Dean DeNobile	20/25, 171 yards, 2 INT
Lafayette	Rushing	Jamar Curtis	21 carries, 131 yards, 2 TD
Lafayette	Receiving	Elijah Steward	10 receptions, 78 yards
Lehigh	Passing	Hayden Johnson	10/13, 115 yards, TD, INT
Lehigh	Rushing	Jaden Green	11 carries, 69 yards, TD
Lehigh	Receiving	Geoffrey Jamiel	4 receptions, 39 yards
