= C. J. Montes =

American football player (born 2002)

No. 7
- Position: Quarterback
- Class: (redshirt) Senior

Personal information
- Born: September 18, 2002 (age 24)
- Listed height: 6 ft 2 in (1.88 m)
- Listed weight: 205 lb (93 kg)

Career information
- High school: Paraclete (Lancaster, California)
- College: New Mexico (2021–2022); Fordham (2023–2024); Kent State (2025)

Awards and highlights
- Second-team All-Patriot League (2023)
- Stats at ESPN

C. J. Montes (born September 18, 2002) is an American college football quarterback. He previously played for the New Mexico Lobos, Fordham Rams and Kent State Golden Flashes.

== Early life ==
Montes grew up in Pasadena, California and initially attended La Salle College Preparatory. After his freshman year he transferred to Long Beach Polytechnic High School. Montes passed for 1,097 yards and 15 touchdowns while also rushing for 206 yards and a touchdown as a sophomore, but transferred after his first semester to John Muir High School. He transferred again to Paraclete High School in Lancaster, California before the start of his junior year without having played at John Muir. Montes passed for over 2,200 yards with 19 touchdown passes as a junior. Montes's senior season was canceled due to COVID-19.

== College career ==
=== New Mexico ===
Montes played in three games during his true freshman season with the New Mexico Lobos while maintaining a redshirt. He made one start for the Lobos, completing 3 of 19 pass attempts for 11 yards with two interceptions and taking four sacks in a 36–7 loss to Colorado State. As a redshirt freshman, Montes played in four games and started the final two games of the 2022 season. He finished the year with 174 yards and one interception on 27-for-51 passing and rushed for one touchdown. Following the end of the season, Montes entered the NCAA transfer portal.

=== Fordham ===
Montes ultimately transferred to Fordham. He was named the Rams' starting quarterback prior to the start of his first season with the team. Montes completed 241 of 376 passes for 3,000 yards and 26 touchdowns with one interception and was named second-team All-Patriot League and was a finalist for the Walter Payton Award.

In the third game of the 2024 season, Montes suffered a lower-body injured injury against Stony Brook that would sideline him for the remainder of the season. On December 2, 2024, Montes announced that he was entering the transfer portal. He would later transfer to Kent State.

=== Statistics ===
Year	Team	Games			Passing								Rushing			
Year	Team	GP	GS	Record	Cmp	Att	Pct	Yds	Avg	TD	INT	Rtg	Att	Yds	Avg	TD
2021	New Mexico	3	1	0–1	10	33	30.3	39	1.2	0	2	28.1	25	−10	−0.4	0
2022	New Mexico	4	2	0–2	27	51	52.9	174	3.4	0	1	77.7	22	4	0.2	1
2023	Fordham	11	11	6–5	241	375	64.3	2,997	8.0	26	1	153.8	100	160	1.6	3
2024	Fordham	3	3	0–3	34	66	51.5	333	5.0	1	0	98.9	38	−74	−1.9	1
2025	Kent State	2	2	1–1	10	19	52.6	140	5.3	1	1	121.4	8	1	0.1	0
Career		23	19	7–12	322	544	59.2	3,683	6.8	28	5	134.0	193	81	0.4	5
