= Todd Davis (American football) =

American football player (born 1992)

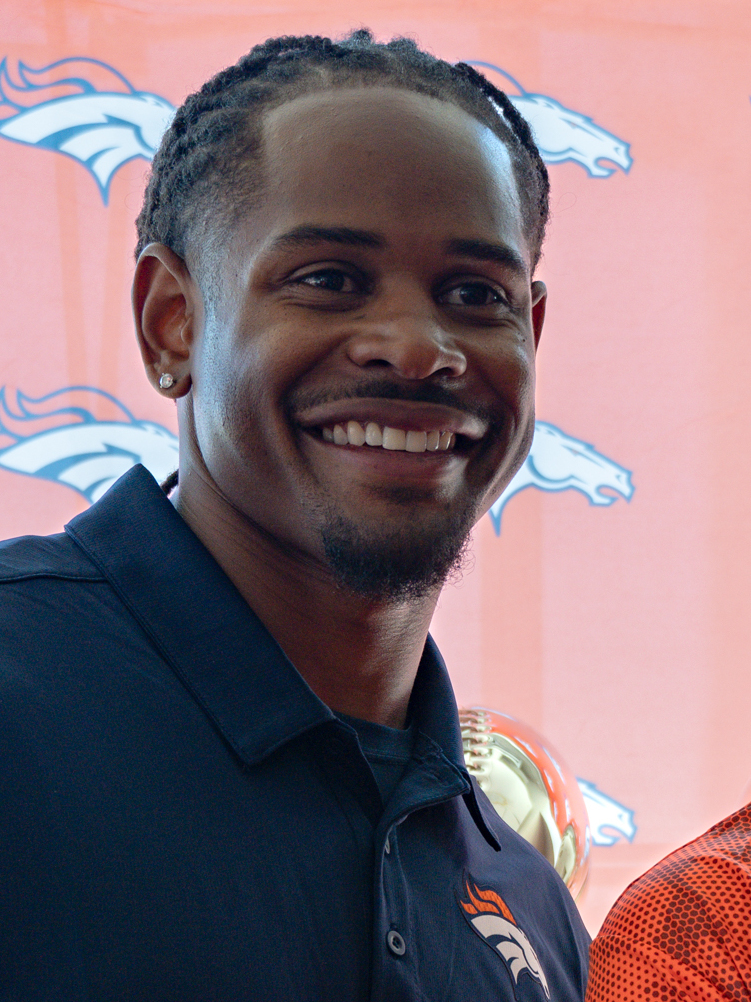
- Davis in 2023

Denver Broncos
- Title: Defensive quality control coach

Personal information
- Born: May 17, 1992 (age 34); Palmdale, California, U.S.
- Listed height: 6 ft 1 in (1.85 m)
- Listed weight: 230 lb (104 kg)

Career information
- Position: Linebacker (No. 52, 51, 40)
- High school: Paraclete (Lancaster, California)
- College: Sacramento State (2010–2013)
- NFL draft: 2014: undrafted

Career history

Playing
- New Orleans Saints (2014); Denver Broncos (2014–2019); Minnesota Vikings (2020); New York Giants (2021)*
- * Offseason or practice squad member only

Coaching
- Denver Broncos (2024–present); Bill Walsh minority coaching fellowship (2024); Defensive quality control coach (2025–present)

Awards and highlights
- Super Bowl champion (50)

Career NFL statistics
- Total tackles: 505
- Sacks: 3
- Forced fumbles: 1
- Fumble recoveries: 2
- Interceptions: 1
- Total touchdowns: 1
- Stats at Pro Football Reference

Todd Davis (born May 17, 1992) is an American professional football coach and former linebacker who is a defensive quality control coach for the Denver Broncos of the National Football League (NFL). He played college football for the Sacramento State Hornets. He was a member of the New Orleans Saints, Denver Broncos, Minnesota Vikings and New York Giants. Davis retired in 2021 at the age of 29.

== Early life ==
Davis played high school football for the Paraclete High School Spirits. He was named first team all-state small schools as a senior after recording 119 tackles, including three sacks.

== College career ==
Davis played 45 games for the Sacramento State Hornets from 2010 to 2013, and finished his collegiate career ranked second in school history with 351 tackles (157 solo) in addition to totaling 9.5 sacks, four forced fumbles, one fumble recovery, three interceptions, six passes defensed and one blocked kick. In 2010, Davis recorded 21 total tackles as a freshman. In 2011, Davis finished with 96 total tackles averaging 8.7 per game, one sack, 5.5 tackles for a loss, two forced fumbles, and one interception as a sophomore. In 2012, Davis finished with 103 total tackles averaging 9.4 per game, 3.5 sacks, 13.5 tackles for a loss, one fumble recovered, and two pass breakups. He was named second-team All-Big Sky and the team's defensive MVP as a junior. In 2013, Davis finished with 131 tackles averaging 10.9 per game, five sacks, 10 tackles for a loss, two forced fumbles, two interceptions, four passes broken up, and one block as a senior. He was named a first-team All-Big Sky Conference selection and second-team All-America choice by The Sports Network following his senior year.

== Professional career ==
Pre-draft measurables
Height	Weight	Arm length	Hand span	Wingspan	40-yard dash	10-yard split	20-yard split	20-yard shuttle	Three-cone drill	Vertical jump	Broad jump	Bench press
6 ft 0 3/8 in (1.84 m)	242 lb (110 kg)	31 1/4 in (0.79 m)	9 1/4 in (0.23 m)	6 ft 5 1/2 in (1.97 m)	4.87 s	1.68 s	2.68 s	4.23 s	6.93 s	35.0 in (0.89 m)	9 ft 10 in (3.00 m)	24 reps
All values from Sacramento State Pro Day

=== New Orleans Saints ===
On June 24, 2014, the New Orleans Saints signed Davis to a three-year, $1.53 million contract as an undrafted free agent. On August 31, 2014, the New Orleans Saints waived Davis as part of their final roster cuts, but signed him to the practice squad the following day. On September 4, 2014, the New Orleans Saints released Davis from their practice squad.

On October 18, 2014, the New Orleans Saints signed Davis to their active roster. On October 19, 2014, Davis made his professional regular season debut during a 24–23 loss at the Detroit Lions in Week 7. On November 12, 2014, the New Orleans Saints waived Davis with intentions of re-signing him to their practice squad. The NFL investigated if the New Orleans Saints stashed Davis in their practice facility in order to thwart a claim on the waiver wire by the Denver Broncos. The NFL later cleared the New Orleans Saints of any wrongdoing.

=== Denver Broncos ===
==== 2014 ====
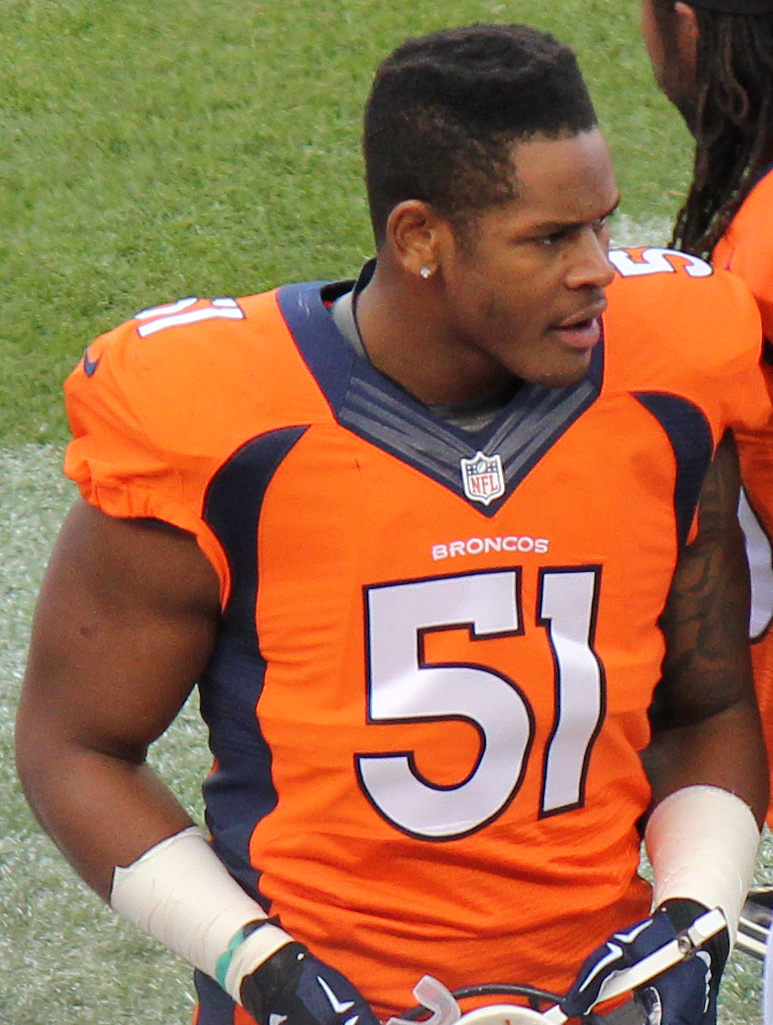
Davis with the Broncos in 2014

On November 13, 2014, the Denver Broncos claimed Davis off of waivers and added him to their active roster. On December 22, 2014, Davis earned his first career start after Brandon Marshall and Danny Trevathan both sustained injuries. He finished the Broncos' 37–28 loss at the Cincinnati Bengals on Monday Night Football with a season-high eight combined tackles. The following week, he recorded six combined tackles and a season-high two pass deflections during a 47–14 victory against the Oakland Raiders in Week 17. He finished his rookie season in 2014 with 22 combined tackles (14 solo) and two pass deflections in nine games and two starts.

The Denver Broncos finished first in the AFC West with a 12–4 record and earned a first round bye. On January 11, 2015, Davis appeared in his first career playoff game and recorded six combined tackles as the Broncos lost 24–13 to the Indianapolis Colts in the AFC Divisional Round.

==== 2015 ====
On January 12, 2015, the Denver Broncos announced their decision to part ways with head coach John Fox. Throughout training camp, Davis competed for a role as a starting inside linebacker against Danny Trevathan and Brandon Marshall. Head coach Gary Kubiak named Davis a backup inside linebacker to begin the regular season, behind Brandon Marshall and Danny Trevathan. In Week 17, he collected a season-high five solo tackles during a 27–20 win against the San Diego Chargers. He finished the season with 21 combined tackles (15 solo) and seven special teams tackles in 16 games and two starts.

The Denver Broncos finished first in the AFC West with a 12–4 record and earned a first round bye. The Denver Broncos defeated the Pittsburgh Steelers 23–16 in the AFC Divisional Round and the New England Patriots 20–18 in the AFC Championship Game. On February 7, 2016, Davis appeared in Super Bowl 50 as the Broncos defeated the Carolina Panthers 24–10.

==== 2016 ====
Davis competed against Corey Nelson during training camp to be a starting inside linebacker after the role was left vacant by the departure of Danny Trevathan. Head coach Gary Kubiak named Davis and Brandon Marshall the starting inside linebackers to begin the regular season. They began the season alongside outside linebackers Von Miller and DeMarcus Ware. He started in the Denver Broncos' season-opener against the Carolina Panthers and recorded seven combined tackles and was credited with half a sack to mark the first of his career during a 21–20 victory. Davis made his first career sack on Panthers' quarterback Cam Newton for a five-yard loss during the fourth quarter alongside DeMarcus Ware. In Week 15, Davis collected a season-high 13 combined tackles (seven solo) during a 16–3 loss against the New England Patriots. The following week, he tied his season-high of 13 combined tackles (ten solo) during a 33–10 loss at the Kansas City Chiefs in Week 16. He finished the 2016 NFL season with 97 combined tackles (64 solo), three pass deflections, one forced fumble, one fumble recovery, and was credited with half a sack in 16 games and 15 starts.

==== 2017 ====
On January 2, 2017, Denver Broncos' head coach Gary Kubiak announced his decision to retire. On March 7, 2017, the Denver Broncos placed a second round restricted free agent tender on Davis. On April 10, 2017, Davis signed his one-year, $2.74 million restricted free agent tender to remain with the Denver Broncos. Joe Woods replaced Wade Phillips as defensive coordinator, but retained Davis and Brandon Marshall as the starting inside linebackers. Head coach Vance Joseph named them starters alongside outside linebackers Shane Ray and Von Miller. On September 24, 2017, Davis collected a season-high ten combined tackles (nine solo) and made his first solo sack of his career during a 26–16 loss at the Buffalo Bills in Week 3. Davis made the first solo sack of his career on Bills' quarterback Tyrod Taylor for a two-yard loss during the third quarter. Davis was sidelined for two games (Weeks 8–9) due to a high ankle sprain. Davis finished the season with 82 combined tackles (48 solo) and one sack in 14 games and 14 starts. Davis was voted by his teammates as the recipient of the 2017 Ed Block Courage Award.

==== 2018 ====
On March 14, 2018, the Denver Broncos signed Davis to a three-year, $15 million contract that includes $6 million guaranteed and a signing bonus of $3 million. Davis and Brandon Marshall returned as the starting inside linebackers. On October 18, 2018, Davis recorded ten combined tackles (six solo), broke up two pass attempts, and returned his first career interception for his first career touchdown during a 45–10 win at the Arizona Cardinals in Week 7. Davis intercepted a pass by Cardinals' rookie quarterback Josh Rosen, that was originally intended for tight end Ricky Seals-Jones, and returned it for a 20-yard touchdown during the first quarter. In Week 9, he tied his season-high of ten combined tackles (nine solo) and made one pass deflection as the Broncos lost 19–17 against the Houston Texans. He started all 16 games in 2018 and recorded a career-high 114 combined tackles (80 solo), seven pass deflections, one interception, one touchdown, and was credited with half a sack.

==== 2019 ====
On July 19, 2019, the Broncos announced that Davis had suffered a partial tear in his calf muscle, expecting him to be out for at least 3 to 4 weeks. In week 17 against the Oakland Raiders, Davis recorded a team high 15 tackles during the 16–15 win.

On September 4, 2020, the Broncos released Davis after six seasons.

=== Minnesota Vikings ===
On September 24, 2020, Davis signed with the Minnesota Vikings. He was placed on the reserve/COVID-19 list by the team on October 30, and activated on November 10.

In Week 15 against the Chicago Bears, Davis recorded his first sack as a Viking on Mitchell Trubisky during the 33–27 loss.

=== New York Giants ===
On July 31, 2021, Davis signed with the New York Giants. He announced his retirement from the NFL on August 3, 2021.

=== NFL statistics ===
Legend
	Won the Super Bowl
**Bold**	Career high

Year	Team	Games		Tackles				Ints		Fumbles	
Year	Team	G	GS	Comb	Total	Ast	Sacks	Int	PD	FF	FR
2014	NO	3	0	3	3	0	0.0	0	0	0	0
2014	DEN	6	2	19	11	8	0.0	0	2	0	0
2015	DEN	**16**	2	21	15	6	0.0	0	0	0	**1**
2016	DEN	**16**	15	97	64	33	0.5	0	3	**1**	**1**
2017	DEN	14	14	82	48	34	**1.0**	0	0	0	0
2018	DEN	**16**	**16**	114	**80**	34	0.5	**1**	**7**	0	0
2019	DEN	14	14	**136**	78	**56**	0.0	0	1	0	0
2020	MIN	11	6	35	16	19	**1.0**	0	2	0	0
Career		96	69	505	315	190	3.0	1	15	1	2

== Coaching career ==
On March 6, 2025, it was announced that Davis would be joining the Denver Broncos' coaching staff as a defensive quality control coach. Davis had previously worked for the Broncos as a coaching intern during training camp in the summer of 2024.

== Personal life ==
In 2015, Davis married Zina Gregory.

On August 3, 2023, Davis became a full-time member on the DNVR Broncos podcast. On March 6, 2025, he left DNVR to become a coach for the Broncos.
