= Ludovick Choquette =

Canadian gridiron football player (born 2001)

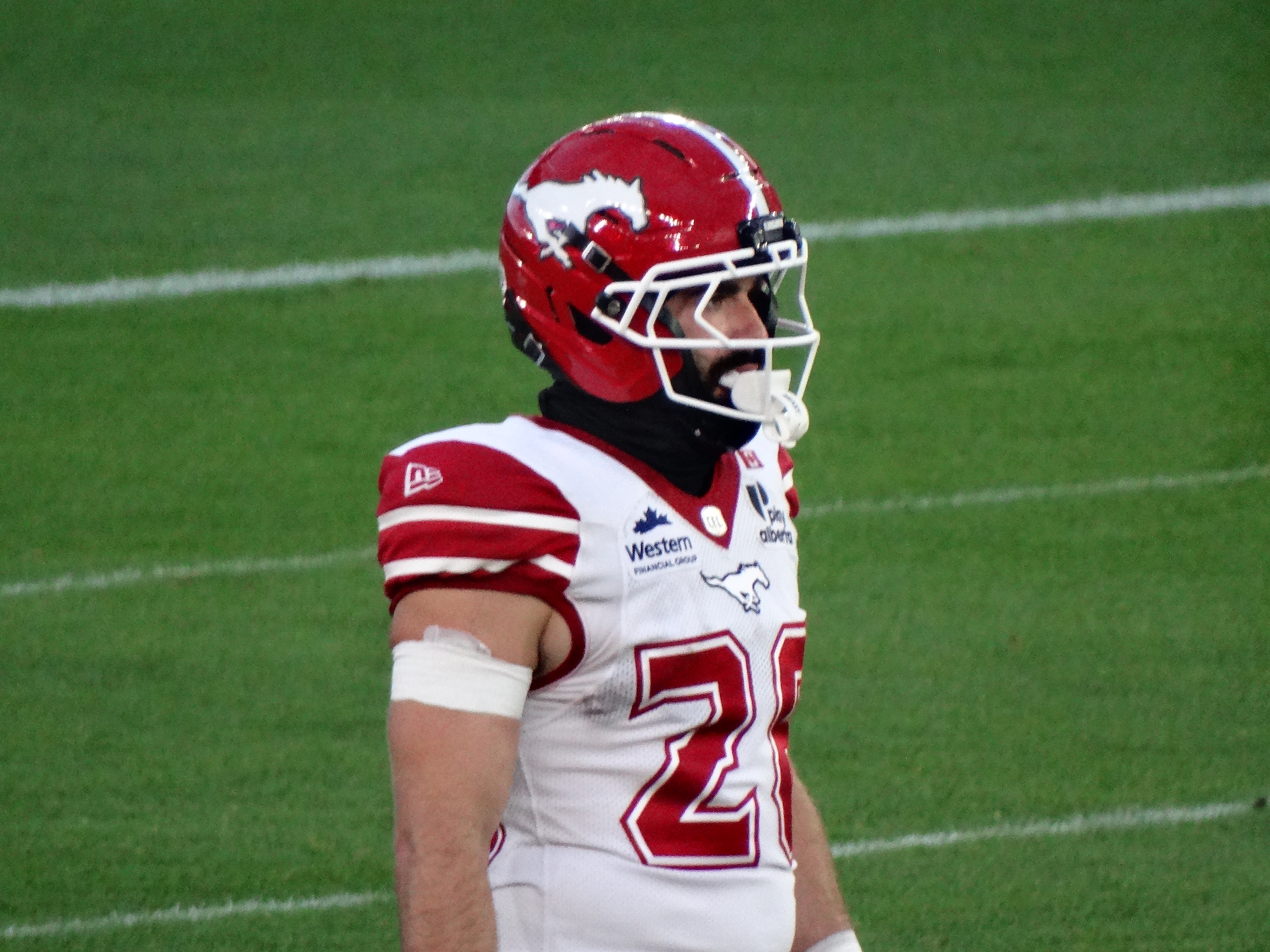
- Choquette with the Calgary Stampeders in 2026

No. 28 – Calgary Stampeders
- Position: Running back
- Roster status: Active
- CFL status: National

Personal information
- Born: July 26, 2001 (age 25); Saint-Jean-sur-Richelieu, Quebec
- Listed height: 5 ft 9 in (1.75 m)
- Listed weight: 211 lb (96 kg)

Career information
- High school: Clearwater Academy (Clearwater, Florida, U.S.)
- College: Western Illinois (2020–2023); Long Island (2024)
- CFL draft: 2025: 6th round, 47th overall pick

Career history
- 2025–present: Calgary Stampeders

Career CFL statistics as of 2026
- Rushing yards: 379
- Rushing average: 5.5
- Rushing touchdowns: 1
- Receptions: 8
- Receiving yards: 16
- Total tackles: 14
- Stats at CFL.ca

Ludovick Choquette (born July 26, 2001) is a Canadian professional football running back for the Calgary Stampeders of the Canadian Football League (CFL). Choquette previously played college football for the Western Illinois Leathernecks and the LIU Sharks.

== College career ==
Hailing from Saint-Jean-sur-Richelieu, Quebec, Choquette played college football for Western Illinois Leathernecks from 2020 to 2023 and the LIU Sharks in 2024. He played in 34 games at Western Illinois and finished with 84 catches for 642 yards, five touchdowns, 679 rushing yards and five rushing touchdowns. Choquette transferred to LIU for his final season where he played in six games, rushing for 216 yards and seven receptions for 37 yards and one touchdown. In his first game for the Sharks, against UAlbany, he rushed for 128 yards, 4 catches for 22 yards and a receiving touchdown. He was named NEC Offensive Player of the Week in week 1.

=== Statistics ===
| Season | Team | Games | Rushing | | | | Receiving | | | |
| Season | Team | GP | Att | Yds | Avg | TD | Rec | Yds | Avg | TD |
|---|---|---|---|---|---|---|---|---|---|---|
| 2020 | Western Illinois | 5 | 32 | 116 | 3.6 | 0 | 13 | 87 | 6.7 | 0 |
| 2021 | Western Illinois | 11 | 43 | 145 | 3.4 | 2 | 48 | 390 | 8.1 | 5 |
| 2022 | Western Illinois | 9 | 60 | 174 | 2.9 | 0 | 10 | 57 | 5.7 | 0 |
| 2023 | Western Illinois | 9 | 64 | 244 | 3.8 | 3 | 13 | 108 | 8.3 | 0 |
| 2024 | LIU | 12 | 99 | 533 | 5.4 | 2 | 13 | 75 | 5.3 | 2 |
| Career | | 40 | 239 | 895 | 3.7 | 5 | 91 | 679 | 7.5 | 6 |

== Professional career ==
Pre-draft measurables
| Height | Weight | 40-yard dash | 20-yard shuttle | Three-cone drill | Vertical jump | Broad jump | Bench press |
|---|---|---|---|---|---|---|---|
| 5 ft 8 7/8 in (1.75 m) | 206 lb (93 kg) | 4.72 s | 4.15 s | 7.01 s | 34.5 in (0.88 m) | 9 ft 7.5 in (2.93 m) | 22 reps |
All values from CFL Combine

Choquette was selected by the Calgary Stampeders with the sixth round with the 47th pick in the 2025 CFL draft. He was officially signed to the team on May 5, 2025. Choquette made his CFL debut against the Hamilton Tiger-Cats, but didn't record any stats. After Jeshrun Antwi was placed on the one-game injured list, he was upgraded to the active roster, where he rushed for 59 yards on seven carries.
