= Ethan Greenwood =

American football player (born 2004)

No. 14 – LIU Sharks
- Position: Quarterback
- Class: Graduate Student

Personal information
- Listed height: 6 ft 0 in (1.83 m)
- Listed weight: 195 lb (88 kg)

Career information
- High school: Kellenberg Memorial (Uniondale, New York)
- College: The Citadel (2022); LIU (2023–present)

Awards and highlights
- Second-team All-NEC (2024)

Ethan Greenwood (born July 27, 2004) is an American college football quarterback for the LIU Sharks of the Northeast Conference (NEC).

== Early life ==
Greenwood grew up in Baldwin, New York, and attended Kellenberg Memorial High School in Uniondale, New York, where he played football and basketball. He was a two-year varsity football player, serving as team captain both seasons, and was twice named to Newsday's Top 100 Players on Long Island list. As a junior, in limited action across four games, he threw for 196 yards and three touchdowns while rushing for 293 yards and three scores. In his senior year, he completed 30 of 49 passes for 410 yards and five touchdowns, adding 199 rushing yards and two touchdowns on 39 carries.

== College career ==
Greenwood began his collegiate career at The Citadel in 2022, where he did not see game action, before transferring to Long Island University.

=== 2024 season ===
As a redshirt sophomore, Greenwood appeared in all 12 games, becoming the starter mid-season after LIU started 0–6. He finished with 921 passing yards, six touchdowns, and two interceptions, while rushing for 913 yards (5.6 yards per carry) and five touchdowns (leading all FCS quarterbacks in rushing yards). Notable performances included 184 rushing yards and a touchdown in a 31–7 win over Stonehill, a 55-yard touchdown run against Sacred Heart, catching a 26-yard touchdown pass in a 24–21 victory over Central Connecticut State, and catching a 64-yard touchdown in the season finale against Wagner. He earned multiple NEC Offensive Player of the Week honors and second-team All-NEC recognition as LIU finished 4–8 (3–3 NEC).

=== 2025 season ===
Entering the season as a redshirt junior, Greenwood was named to the Walter Payton Award Preseason Watch List and preseason Second-Team All-American by Stats Perform. He led LIU to its first-ever win over an FBS opponent, defeating Eastern Michigan 28–23, where he rushed for two touchdowns (including a 65-yard run) and passed for 105 yards on 3-of-5 completions. In a win over Duquesne, he accounted for three touchdowns (two passing, one rushing). Greenwood continued as the Sharks' dual-threat starter throughout the season.

Greenwood entered the transfer portal November 28, 2025, however withdrew his name on January 16 to return to LIU per his instagram.
