= 2024 Duquesne Dukes football team =

American college football season

2024 Duquesne Dukes football

NEC co-champion
- Conference: Northeast Conference

Ranking
- FCS Coaches: No. 25
- Record: 8–3 (5–1 NEC)
- Head coach: Jerry Schmitt (20th season)
- Offensive coordinator: Anthony Doria (9th season)
- Defensive coordinator: Mickey Jacobs (1st season)
- Home stadium: Arthur J. Rooney Athletic Field

2024 Northeast Conference football standings
	Conf.			Overall
Team	W		L	W		L
Central Connecticut +^	5	–	1	7	–	6
Duquesne +	5	–	1	8	–	3
Robert Morris	4	–	2	7	–	5
LIU	3	–	3	4	–	8
Wagner	2	–	4	4	–	8
Saint Francis (PA)	2	–	4	4	–	7
Mercyhurst*	0	–	0	4	–	7
Stonehill*	0	–	6	1	–	10
+ – Conference co-champions; ^ – FCS playoff participant; * – Stonehill and Mercyhurst are ineligible for NEC title and FCS postseason play due to transition from NCAA Division II.; Rankings from STATS Poll

The 2024 Duquesne Dukes football team represented Duquesne University as a member of the Northeast Conference (NEC) during the 2024 NCAA Division I FCS football season. The Dukes were led by 20th-year head coach Jerry Schmitt and played their home games at Rooney Field in Pittsburgh.

== Schedule ==
Date	Time	Opponent	Rank	Site	TV	Result	Attendance
August 29	7:30 p.m.	at Toledo*		Glass Bowl; Toledo, OH	ESPN+	L 10–49	23,515
September 7	3:30 p.m.	at Boston College*		Alumni Stadium; Chestnut Hill, MA	ACCNX/ESPN+	L 0–56	38,441
September 14	2:00 p.m.	at No. 21 Youngstown State*		Stambaugh Stadium; Youngstown, OH	ESPN+	W 28–25	12,415
September 21	12:00 p.m.	West Virginia Wesleyan*		Arthur J. Rooney Athletic Field; Pittsburgh, PA	NEC Front Row	W 35–0	1,865
October 5	1:00 p.m.	LIU^{†}		Arthur J. Rooney Athletic Field; Pittsburgh, PA	NEC Front Row	W 47–21	2,956
October 12	12:00 p.m.	at Saint Francis (PA)		DeGol Field; Loretto, PA	ESPN+	W 38–7	1,799
October 26	1:00 p.m.	at Stonehill		W.B. Mason Stadium; Easton, MA	NEC Front Row	W 48–34	1,117
November 2	12:00 p.m.	Mercyhurst		Arthur J. Rooney Athletic Field; Pittsburgh, PA	NEC Front Row	W 31–24	1,654
November 9	12:00 p.m.	Robert Morris	No. 25	Arthur J. Rooney Athletic Field; Pittsburgh, PA	NEC Front Row	W 31–6	2,018
November 16	12:00 p.m.	Wagner	No. 22	Arthur J. Rooney Athletic Field; Pittsburgh, PA	NEC Front Row	W 42–21	1,653
November 23	12:00 p.m.	at Central Connecticut	No. 19	Arute Field; New Britain, CT	NEC Front Row	L 14–21	3,707
*Non-conference game; ^{†}Homecoming; Rankings from STATS Poll released prior to the game; All times are in Eastern time

== Game summaries ==
=== at Toledo (FBS) ===
Game One – Duquesne Dukes (0–0) at Toledo Rockets (FBS) (0–0) – Game summary

Quarter	1	2	3	4	Total
Dukes	7	3	0	0	10
Rockets (FBS)	21	7	14	7	49

at Glass Bowl, Toledo, OH

- Date: Thursday August 29, 2024
- Game time: 7:30 p.m.
- Game weather: 78 °F (26 °C), Wind: 8 mph (13 km/h) E, Sunny
- Game attendance: 23,515
- Referee: Aaron Adams
- TV announcers (ESPN+): Michael Reghi (play-by-play) and Marcus Ray (analyst)

Game information

First quarter

- (11:48) TOL TD: Junior Vandeross III 9-yard pass from Tucker Gleason (Dylan Cunanan kick) TOL 7–0; 9 plays, 65 yards, 3:12
- (04:31) TOL TD: Jacquez Stuart 8-yard run (Dylan Cunanan kick) TOL 14–0; 7 plays, 57 yards, 2:24
- (01:20) DUQ TD: Noah Canty 4-yard pass from Darius Perrantes (Brian Bruzdewicz kick) TOL 14–7; 6 plays, 75 yards, 3:11
- (01:02) TOL TD: Jerjuan Newton 54-yard pass from Tucker Gleason (Dylan Cunanan kick) TOL 21–7; 1 plays, 54 yards, 00:12

Second quarter

- (08:51) DUQ FG: Brian Bruzdewicz 22-yard field goal TOL 21–10; 13 plays, 82 yards, 7:03
- (01:59) TOL TD: Anthony Torres 14-yard pass from Tucker Gleason (Dylan Cunanan kick) TOL 28–10; 5 plays, 29 yards, 2:16

Third quarter

- (11:49) TOL TD: Jacquez Stuart 1-yard run (Dylan Cunanan kick) TOL 35–10; 7 plays, 38 yards, 3:01
- (00:14) TOL TD: Willie Shaw III 10-yard run (Dylan Cunanan kick) TOL 42–10; 2 plays, 21 yards, 00:35

Fourth quarter

- (07:41) TOL TD: Zy'marion Lang 18-yard pass from John Alan Richter (Spencer Conrad kick) TOL 49–10; 8 plays, 80 yards, 4:03

Statistics	DUQ	TOL
First downs	15	27
Total yards	284	446
Rushing yards	123	166
Passing yards	161	280
Passing: Comp–Att–Int	17–29–1	21–30–0
Time of possession	31:04	28:56

Team	Category	Player	Statistics
Duquesne	Passing	Darius Perrantes	15/26, 143 yards, TD, INT
Duquesne	Rushing	Taj Butts	5 carries, 39 yards
Duquesne	Receiving	John Erby	7 receptions, 69 yards
Toledo	Passing	Tucker Gleason	15/24, 202 yards, 3 TD
Toledo	Rushing	Willie Shaw III	7 carries, 50 yards, TD
Toledo	Receiving	Jerjuan Newton	5 receptions, 98 yards, TD

=== at Boston College (FBS) ===
Game Two – Duquesne Dukes (0–1) at Boston College Eagles (FBS) (1–0) – Game summary

Quarter	1	2	3	4	Total
Dukes	0	0	0	0	0
Eagles (FBS)	0	0	0	0	0

at Alumni Stadium • Chestnut Hill, MA

- Date: Saturday September 7, 2024
- Game time: 3:30 p.m. EST/12:30 p.m. PST
- Game attendance: 38,441
- TV announcers (ACCNX/ESPN+): Bill Spaulding (play-by-play) and Craig Haubert (analyst)

Game information

First quarter

Second quarter

Third quarter

Fourth quarter

Statistics	DUQ	BC
First downs		
Total yards		
Rushing yards		
Passing yards		
Passing: Comp–Att–Int		
Time of possession		

Team	Category	Player	Statistics
Duquesne	Passing		
Duquesne	Rushing		
Duquesne	Receiving		
Boston College	Passing		
Boston College	Rushing		
Boston College	Receiving		

=== at No. 21 Youngstown State ===
Game Three – Duquesne Dukes (0–2) vs No. 21 Youngstown State Penguins (1–1) – Game summary

Quarter	1	2	3	4	Total
Dukes	7	7	7	7	28
No. 21 Penguins	3	14	0	8	25

at Stambaugh Stadium • Youngstown, OH

- Date: Saturday September 14, 2024
- Game time: 2:00 p.m.
- Game weather: Sunny • Temperature: 81 °F (27 °C) • Wind: SE at 10 miles per hour (16 km/h)
- Game attendance: 12,415
- Referee: David Hergert
- TV announcers (ESPN+): Drae Smith (play-by-play)

Game information

First quarter

- (6:57) YSU – Andrew Lastovka 45-yard field goal (Drive: 8 plays, 43 yards, 03:48; YSU 3–0)
- (6:05) DUQ – Shawn Solomon, Jr. 3-yard run, Brian Bruzdewicz kick (Drive: 2 plays, 75 yards, 00:46; Duquesne 7–3)

Second quarter

- (13:23) YSU – Beau Brungard 1-yard run, Andrew Lastovka kick (Drive: 13 plays, 71 yards, 07:35; YSU 10–7)
- (1:56) YSU – Tyshon King 5-yard run, Andrew Lastovka kick (Drive: 14 plays, 76 yards, 08:37; YSU 17–7)
- (0:20) DUQ – Tedy Afful 3-yard pass from Darius Perrantes, Brian Bruzdewicz kick (Drive: 9 plays, 75 yards, 01:30; YSU 17–14)

Third quarter

- (1:21) DUQ – Tedy Afful 5-yard pass from Darius Perrantes, Brian Bruzdewicz kick (Drive: 11 plays, 80 yards, 05:05; Duquesne 21–17)

Fourth quarter

- (1:40) DUQ – JaMario Clements 75-yard run, Brian Bruzdewicz kick (Drive: 4 plays, 92 yards, 01:28; Duquesne 28–17)
- (0:20) YSU – Tyshon King 1-yard run, Beau Brungard pass to Max Tomczak for two-point conversion (Drive: 11 plays, 75 yards, 01:20; Duquesne 28–25)

Statistics	DUQ	YSU
First downs	17	26
Total yards	346	371
Rushing yards	189	178
Passing yards	157	193
Passing: Comp–Att–Int	17–26–0	19–31–1
Time of possession	17:43	42:17

Team	Category	Player	Statistics
Duquesne	Passing	Darius Perrantes	17/26, 157 yards, 2 TD
Duquesne	Rushing	JaMario Clements	12 carries, 204 yards, TD
Duquesne	Receiving	Tedy Afful	7 receptions, 56 yards, 2 TD
Youngstown State	Passing	Beau Brungard	19/29, 193 yards, INT
Youngstown State	Rushing	Tyshon King	15 carries, 67 yards, 2 TD
Youngstown State	Receiving	Max Tomczak	5 receptions, 62 yards

=== West Virginia Wesleyan (DII) ===
Game Four – West Virginia Wesleyan Bobcats (DII) (0–2) vs Duquesne Dukes (1–2) – Game summary

Quarter	1	2	3	4	Total
Bobcats (DII)	0	0	0	0	0
Dukes	0	0	0	0	0

at Arthur J. Rooney Athletic Field • Pittsburgh, PA

- Date: Saturday September 21, 2024
- Game time: 12:00 p.m.
- Game weather: 0 °F (−18 °C)
- Game attendance: 1,865
- TV: NEC Front Row

Game information

First quarter
Second quarter
Third quarter
Fourth quarter

Statistics	WVW	DUQ
First downs		
Total yards		
Rushing yards		
Passing yards		
Passing: Comp–Att–Int		
Time of possession		

Team	Category	Player	Statistics
West Virginia Wesleyan	Passing		
West Virginia Wesleyan	Rushing		
West Virginia Wesleyan	Receiving		
Duquesne	Passing		
Duquesne	Rushing		
Duquesne	Receiving		

=== LIU ===
Game Five – LIU Sharks (0–5) vs Duquesne Dukes (2–2) – Game summary

Quarter	1	2	3	4	Total
Sharks	0	7	7	7	21
Dukes	19	14	7	7	47

at Arthur J. Rooney Athletic Field • Pittsburgh, PA

- Date: Saturday October 5, 2024
- Game time: 1:00 p.m.
- Game weather: 0 °F (−18 °C)
- Game attendance: 2,956
- TV: NEC Front Row

Game information

First quarter
Second quarter
Third quarter
Fourth quarter

Statistics	LIU	DUQ
First downs		
Total yards		
Rushing yards		
Passing yards		
Passing: Comp–Att–Int		
Time of possession		

Team	Category	Player	Statistics
LIU	Passing		
LIU	Rushing		
LIU	Receiving		
Duquesne	Passing		
Duquesne	Rushing		
Duquesne	Receiving		

=== at Saint Francis (PA) ===
Game Six – Duquesne Dukes (3–2) at Saint Francis Red Flash (2–3) – Game summary

Quarter	1	2	3	4	Total
Dukes	0	0	0	0	0
Red Flash	0	0	0	0	0

at DeGol Field • Loretto, PA

- Date: Saturday October 12, 2024
- Game time: 12:00 p.m.
- Game weather: 0 °F (−18 °C)
- Game attendance: 1,799
- TV announcers (ESPN+): TBD

Game information

First quarter
Second quarter
Third quarter
Fourth quarter

Statistics	DUQ	SFPA
First downs		
Total yards		
Rushing yards		
Passing yards		
Passing: Comp–Att–Int		
Time of possession		

Team	Category	Player	Statistics
Duquesne	Passing		
Duquesne	Rushing		
Duquesne	Receiving		
Saint Francis (PA)	Passing		
Saint Francis (PA)	Rushing		
Saint Francis (PA)	Receiving		

=== at Stonehill ===
Game Seven – Duquesne Dukes (4–2) at Stonehill Skyhawks (1–5) – Game summary

Quarter	1	2	3	4	Total
Dukes	0	0	0	0	0
Skyhawks	0	0	0	0	0

at W.B. Mason Stadium • Easton, MA

- Date: Saturday October 26, 2024
- Game time: 1:00 p.m.
- Game weather: 0 °F (−18 °C)
- Game attendance: 1,117
- TV announcers (NEC Front Row): TBD

Game information

First quarter
Second quarter
Third quarter
Fourth quarter

Statistics	DUQ	STO
First downs		
Total yards		
Rushing yards		
Passing yards		
Passing: Comp–Att–Int		
Time of possession		

Team	Category	Player	Statistics
Duquesne	Passing		
Duquesne	Rushing		
Duquesne	Receiving		
Stonehill	Passing		
Stonehill	Rushing		
Stonehill	Receiving		

=== Mercyhurst ===
Game Eight – Mercyhurst Lakers (2–6) vs Duquesne Dukes (5–2) – Game summary

Quarter	1	2	3	4	Total
Lakers	0	0	0	0	0
Dukes	0	0	0	0	0

at Arthur J. Rooney Athletic Field • Pittsburgh, PA

- Date: Saturday November 2, 2024
- Game time: 12:00 p.m. EST
- Game weather: 0 °F (−18 °C)
- Game attendance: 1,654
- TV announcers (NEC Front Row): TBD

Game information

First quarter
Second quarter
Third quarter
Fourth quarter

Statistics	MERC	DUQ
First downs		
Total yards		
Rushing yards		
Passing yards		
Passing: Comp–Att–Int		
Time of possession		

Team	Category	Player	Statistics
Mercyhurst	Passing		
Mercyhurst	Rushing		
Mercyhurst	Receiving		
Duquesne	Passing		
Duquesne	Rushing		
Duquesne	Receiving		

=== Robert Morris ===
Game Nine – Robert Morris Colonials (6–3) vs No. 25 Duquesne Dukes (6–2) – Game summary

Quarter	1	2	3	4	Total
Colonials	0	0	0	0	0
No. 25 Dukes	0	0	0	0	0

at Arthur J. Rooney Athletic Field • Pittsburgh, PA

- Date: Saturday November 9, 2024
- Game time: 12:00 p.m. EST
- Game weather: 0 °F (−18 °C)
- Game attendance: 2,018
- TV announcers (NEC Front Row): TBD

Game information

First quarter
Second quarter
Third quarter
Fourth quarter

Statistics	RMU	DUQ
First downs		
Total yards		
Rushing yards		
Passing yards		
Passing: Comp–Att–Int		
Time of possession		

Team	Category	Player	Statistics
Robert Morris	Passing		
Robert Morris	Rushing		
Robert Morris	Receiving		
Duquesne	Passing		
Duquesne	Rushing		
Duquesne	Receiving		

=== Wagner ===
Game Ten – Wagner Seahawks (4–6) vs No. 22 Duquesne Dukes (7–2) – Game summary

Quarter	1	2	3	4	Total
Seahawks	0	0	0	0	0
No. 22 Dukes	0	0	0	0	0

at Rooney Field • Pittsburgh, PA

- Date: Saturday November 16, 2024
- Game time: 12:00 p.m.
- Game attendance: 1,653
- TV: NEC Front Row

Game information

First quarter
Second quarter
Third quarter
Fourth quarter

Statistics	WAG	DUQ
First downs		
Total yards		
Rushing yards		
Passing yards		
Passing: Comp–Att–Int		
Time of possession		

Team	Category	Player	Statistics
Wagner	Passing		
Wagner	Rushing		
Wagner	Receiving		
Duquesne	Passing		
Duquesne	Rushing		
Duquesne	Receiving		

=== at Central Connecticut ===
Game Eleven – No. 19 Duquesne Dukes (8–2) vs Central Connecticut Blue Devils (6–5) – Game summary

Quarter	1	2	3	4	Total
No. 19 Dukes	0	7	7	0	14
Blue Devils	0	13	0	8	21

at Arute Field • New Britain, CT

- Date: Saturday November 23, 2024
- Game time: 12:00 p.m. EST
- Game weather: Rain
- Game attendance: 3,707
- Referee: Michael Davis
- TV announcers (NEC Front Row): Bruce Biel (play-by-play) and Mark Robbins (analyst)

Game information

First quarter

- no scoring

Second quarter

- (10:17) CCSU – Jack Barnum 47 Yd Field Goal (Drive: 7 plays, 19 yards, 2:13; Central Connecticut 3-0)
- (7:58) DUQ – Joey Isabella 36 Yd pass from Darius Perrantes (Brian Bruzdewicz Kick) (Drive: 5 plays, 75 yards, 2:19; Duquesne 7-3)
- (6:42) CCSU – Elijah Howard 4 Yd Run (Jack Barnum Kick) (Drive: 3 plays, 69 yards, 1:10; Central Connecticut 10-7)
- (0:04) CCSU – Jack Barnum 24 Yd Field Goal (Drive: 7 plays, 42 yards, 0:53; Central Connecticut 13-7)

Third quarter

- (14:46) DUQ – Joey Isabella 85 Yd pass from Darius Perrantes (Brian Bruzdewicz Kick) (Drive: 1 play, 85 yards, 0:14; Duquesne 14-13)

Fourth quarter

- (13:44) CCSU – Elijah Howard 6 Yd Run (Elijah Howard Pass to Brady Olson for Two-Point Conversion) (Drive: 4 plays, 32 yards, 1:07; Central Connecticut 21-14)

Statistics	DUQ	CCSU
First downs	15	17
Total yards	358	342
Rushing yards	62	126
Passing yards	296	216
Passing: Comp–Att–Int	17–34–7	15–35–1
Time of possession	25:33	34:27

Team	Category	Player	Statistics
Duquesne	Passing	Darius Perrantes	17/33, 296 yards, 2 TD, 7 INT
Duquesne	Rushing	Taj Butts	12 carries, 41 yards
Duquesne	Receiving	Joey Isabella	5 receptions, 149 yards, 2 TD
Central Connecticut	Passing	Brady Olson	15/34, 216 yards, INT
Central Connecticut	Rushing	Elijah Howard	25 carries, 110 yards, 2 TD
Central Connecticut	Receiving	Isaac Boston	6 receptions, 83 yards
