= 2024 Central Connecticut Blue Devils football team =

American college football season

2024 Central Connecticut Blue Devils football
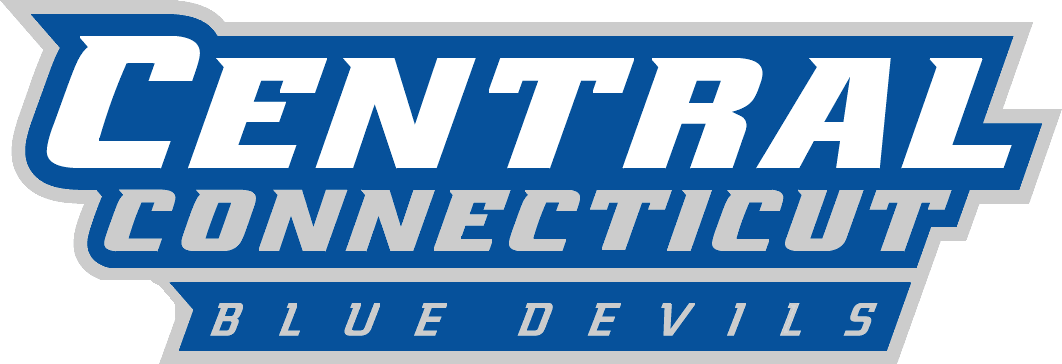

NEC co-champion

NCAA Division I First Round, L 17–21 at Rhode Island
- Conference: Northeast Conference
- Record: 7–6 (5–1 NEC)
- Head coach: Adam Lechtenberg (2nd season)
- Offensive coordinator: Caleb Gelsomino (2nd season)
- Defensive coordinator: Ron DiGravio (6th season)
- Home stadium: Arute Field

2024 Northeast Conference football standings
	Conf.			Overall
Team	W		L	W		L
Central Connecticut +^	5	–	1	7	–	6
Duquesne +	5	–	1	8	–	3
Robert Morris	4	–	2	7	–	5
LIU	3	–	3	4	–	8
Wagner	2	–	4	4	–	8
Saint Francis (PA)	2	–	4	4	–	7
Mercyhurst*	0	–	0	4	–	7
Stonehill*	0	–	6	1	–	10
+ – Conference co-champions; ^ – FCS playoff participant; * – Stonehill and Mercyhurst are ineligible for NEC title and FCS postseason play due to transition from NCAA Division II.; Rankings from STATS Poll

The 2024 Central Connecticut Blue Devils football team represented Central Connecticut State University as a member of the Northeast Conference (NEC) during the 2024 NCAA Division I FCS football season. The Blue Devils were led by second-year head coach Adam Lechtenberg and played their home games at Arute Field in New Britain, Connecticut.

After finishing their regular season with a 7–5 record (5–1 in NEC Football play), the Blue Devils qualified for the NCAA postseason for the first time since 2019.

== Schedule ==
Date	Time	Opponent	Site	TV	Result	Attendance
August 29	7:00 p.m.	at Central Michigan*	Kelly/Shorts Stadium; Mount Pleasant, MI	ESPN+	L 10–66	18,055
September 7	6:00 p.m.	Fordham*	Arute Field; New Britain, CT	NEC Front Row	W 33–3	3,784
September 14	12:00 p.m.	at Saint Francis (PA)	DeGol Field; Loretto, PA	NEC Front Row	W 27–20	2,616
September 21	3:30 p.m.	at UMass*	McGuirk Alumni Stadium; Hadley, MA	ESPN+	L 31–35	10,847
October 5	12:00 p.m.	at Yale*	Yale Bowl; New Haven, CT	ESPN+	L 22–23	5,123
October 12	12:00 p.m.	Mercyhurst	Arute Field; New Britain, CT	NEC Front Row	W 38–20	3,167
October 19	1:00 p.m.	at No. 22 Dartmouth*	Memorial Field; Hanover, NH	ESPN+	L 16–20	2,573
October 26	12:00 p.m.	at LIU	Bethpage Federal Credit Union Stadium; Brookville, NY	ESPN+, NESN 360	L 21–24	453
November 2	12:00 p.m.	Wagner^{†}	Arute Field; New Britain, CT	NEC Front Row	W 24–14	4,152
November 9	1:00 p.m.	at Stonehill	W.B. Mason Stadium; Easton, MA	NEC Front Row	W 21–17	1,674
November 16	12:00 p.m.	Robert Morris	Arute Field; New Britain, CT	NEC Front Row	W 35–33 ^{2OT}	3,192
November 23	12:00 p.m.	No. 19 Duquesne	Arute Field; New Britain, CT	NEC Front Row	W 21–14	3,707
November 30	12:00 p.m.	at No. 10 Rhode Island*	Meade Stadium; Kingston, RI (NCAA Division I First Round)	ESPN+	L 17–21	3,522
*Non-conference game; ^{†}Homecoming; Rankings from STATS Poll released prior to the game; All times are in Eastern time; Source:

== Game summaries ==
=== at Central Michigan (FBS) ===
Game One – Central Connecticut Blue Devils (0-0) at Central Michigan Chippewas (FBS) (0-0) – Game summary

Quarter	1	2	3	4	Total
Blue Devils	7	0	3	0	10
Chippewas (FBS)	14	28	24	0	66

at Kelly/Shorts Stadium • Mount Pleasant, MI

- Date: Thursday, August 29, 2024
- Game time: 7:00 PM
- Game weather: Cloudy, 78 °F (26 °C)
- Game attendance: 18,055
- Referee: Billy Williams
- TV announcers (ESPN+): Dan Gutowsky (play-by-play) and Randy Buffington (analyst)
- Box Score Recap

Game information

First quarter

- (10:31) CMU – Myles Bailey 7-yard run (Tristan Mattson kick) (Drive: 8 plays, 79 yards, 4:04; Central Michigan 7-0)
- (5:55) CCSU – Elijah Howard 3-yard run (Jack Barnum kick) (Drive: 10 plays, 75 yards, 4:37; Tied 7-7)
- (5:40) CMU – Stephan Bracey Jr. 87-yard kickoff return (Tristan Mattson kick) (Central Michigan 14-7)

Second quarter

- (11:50) CMU – B.J. Harris 9-yard run (Tristan Mattson kick) (Drive: 3 plays, 46 yards, 1:33; Central Michigan 21-7)
- (7:34) CMU – Evan Boyd 47-yard pass from Joe Labas (Tristan Mattson kick) (Drive: 2 plays, 80 yards, 0:50; Central Michigan 28-7)
- (3:16) CMU – Solomon Davis 17-yard pass from Joe Labas (Tristan Mattson kick) (Drive: 5 plays, 37 yards, 2:57; Central Michigan 35-7)
- (0:37) CMU – Myles Bailey 2-yard run (Tristan Mattson kick) (Drive: 8 plays, 55 yards, 1:45; Central Michigan 42-7)

Third quarter

- (11:17) CCSU – Jack Barnum 50-yard field goal (Drive: 10 plays, 42 yards, 3:43; Central Michigan 42-10)
- (8:45) CMU – Tristan Mattson 26-yard field goal (Drive: 6 plays, 69 yards, 2:28; Central Michigan 45-10)
- (7:04) CMU – Donte Kent 68-yard punt return (Tristan Mattson kick) (Central Michigan 52-10)
- (3:45) CMU – Solomon Davis 72-yard pass from Joe Labas (Tristan Mattson kick) (Drive: 3 plays, 86 yards, 1:00; Central Michigan 59-10)
- (1:48) CMU – Aakeem Snell 46-yard interception return (Tristan Mattson kick) (Central Michigan 66-10)

Fourth quarter

- no scoring

Statistics	CCSU	CMU
First downs	16	22
Total yards	285	491
Rushing yards	194	113
Passing yards	91	378
Passing: Comp–Att–Int	12-23-1	21-28-3
Time of possession	34:57	25:03

Team	Category	Player	Statistics
Central Connecticut	Passing	Brady Olson	12/20, 91 yards
Central Connecticut	Rushing	Jadon Turner	5 carries, 61 yards
Central Connecticut	Receiving	Michael Plaskon	4 receptions, 44 yards
Central Michigan	Passing	Joe Labas	18/24, 342 yards, 3 TD
Central Michigan	Rushing	Myles Bailey	9 carries, 68 yards, 2 TD
Central Michigan	Receiving	Solomon Davis	4 receptions, 109 yards, 2 TD

=== Fordham ===
Game Two – Fordham Rams (0-1) at Central Connecticut Blue Devils (0-1) – Game summary

Quarter	1	2	3	4	Total
Rams	0	0	3	0	3
Blue Devils	0	19	14	0	33

at Arute Field • New Britain, CT

- Date: Saturday, September 7, 2024
- Game time: 6:00 PM
- Game weather: Rain, 60 °F (16 °C)
- Game attendance: 3,784
- Referee: Lance Carlen
- TV announcers (NEC Front Row): Bruce Biel (play-by-play) and Marc Robbins (analyst)
- Box Score Recap

Game information

First quarter

- no scoring

Second quarter

- (11:49) CCSU - Vincent Thomas 0-yard Fumble Return (Jack Barnum Kick) (Drive: 4 plays, -39 yards, 1:49; Central Connecticut 7-0)
- (6:55) CCSU - Elijah Howard 24-yard Run (Jack Barnum Kick) (Drive: 7 plays, 51 yards, 3:26; Central Connecticut 14-0)
- (1:15) CCSU - Team Safety (Drive: 3 plays, -16 yards, 0:50; Central Connecticut 16-0)
- (0:00) CCSU - Jack Barnum 30-yard Field Goal (Drive: 6 plays, 31 yards, 1:04; Central Connecticut 19-0)

Third quarter

- (8:48) FORD - Bennett Henderson 20-yard Field Goal (Drive: 11 plays, 52 yards, 4:16; Central Connecticut 19-3)
- (5:21) CCSU - Donny Marcus 18-yard pass from Brady Olson (Jack Barnum Kick) (Drive: 3 plays, 80 yards, 1:20; Central Connecticut 26-3)
- (0:42) CCSU - Eli Daniels 32-yard pass from Brady Olson (Jack Barnum Kick) (Drive: 5 plays, 47 yards, 3:06; Central Connecticut 33-3)

Fourth quarter

- no scoring

Statistics	FOR	CCSU
First downs	11	16
Total yards	188	284
Rushing yards	47	61
Passing yards	141	223
Passing: Comp–Att–Int	17-36-0	15-31-2
Time of possession	29:27	30:33

Team	Category	Player	Statistics
Fordham	Passing	CJ Montes	17/36, 141 yards
Fordham	Rushing	Julius Loughridge	15 carries, 127 yards
Fordham	Receiving	Mekai Felton	4 receptions, 48 yards
Central Connecticut	Passing	Brady Olson	15/31, 223 yards, 2 TD, 2 INT
Central Connecticut	Rushing	Elijah Howard	19 carries, 50 yards, 1 TD
Central Connecticut	Receiving	Sean O'Brien	2 receptions, 77 yards

=== at Saint Francis (PA) ===
Game Three – Central Connecticut Blue Devils (1–1) at Saint Francis Red Flash (1–1) – Game summary

Quarter	1	2	3	4	Total
Blue Devils	6	14	0	7	27
Red Flash	7	7	6	0	20

at DeGol Field • Loretto, PA

- Date: September 14, 2024
- Game time: 12:00 pm
- Game weather: Partly Cloudy, 69 °F (21 °C)
- Game attendance: 2,616
- Referee: Michael Quinn
- TV announcers (NEC Front Row): Pat Farabaugh (play-by-play) and Jay Roberts (analyst)
- Box Score Recap

Game information

First quarter

- (11:12) CCSU - Jack Barnum 39-yard Field Goal (Drive:10 plays, 34 yards, 3:43; Central Connecticut 3-0)
- (10:04) CCSU - Jack Barnum 40-yard Field Goal (Drive:4 plays, 1 yard, 1:01; Central Connecticut 6-0)
- (9:50) SFU - DaMario Crawford 94-yard Kickoff Return (Mac Plummer Kick) (Saint Francis 7-6)

Second quarter

- (12:39) CCSU - Brady Olson 7-yard Run (Jack Barnum Kick) (Drive: 12 plays, 80 yards, 4:42; Central Connecticut 13-7)
- (7:21) SFU - DeMarcus McElroy 97-yard Run (Mac Plummer Kick) (Drive: 1 play, 97 yards, 0:15; Saint Francis 14-13)
- (0:25) CCSU - Michael Plaskon 11-yard pass from Brady Olson (Jack Barnum Kick) (Drive: 8 plays, 51 yards, 1:48; Central Connecticut 20-14)

Third quarter

- (5:32) SFU - Fran Brown Jr. 0-yard Fumble Return (Mac Plummer PAT failed) (Drive: 4 plays, 97 yards, 2:04; Tied 20-20)

Fourth quarter

- (1:45) CCSU - Kimal Clark 10-yard Fumble Return (Jack Barnum Kick) (Drive: 3 plays, 89 yards, 0:21; Central Connecticut 27-20)

Statistics	CCSU	SFPA
First downs	19	12
Total yards	297	248
Rushing yards	115	103
Passing yards	182	145
Passing: Comp–Att–Int	22-43-0	20-25-1
Time of possession	30:30	29:30

Team	Category	Player	Statistics
Central Connecticut	Passing	Brady Olson	21/42, 163 yards, 1 TD
Central Connecticut	Rushing	Elijah Howard	23 carries, 102 yards
Central Connecticut	Receiving	Michael Plaskon	6 receptions, 53 yards, 1 TD
Saint Francis (PA)	Passing	Jeff Hoenstine	12/16, 112 yards, INT
Saint Francis (PA)	Rushing	DeMarcus McElroy	9 carries, 124 yards, 1 TD
Saint Francis (PA)	Receiving	Jayden Ivory	5 receptions, 47 yards

=== at UMass (FBS) ===
Game Four – Central Connecticut Blue Devils (2–1) at UMass Minutemen (FBS) (0–3) – Game summary

Quarter	1	2	3	4	Total
Blue Devils	0	21	7	3	31
Minutemen (FBS)	7	14	7	7	35

at Warren McGuirk Alumni Stadium • Hadley, MA

- Date: September 21, 2024
- Game time: 3:30 pm
- Game weather: Cloudy, 67 °F (19 °C)
- Game attendance: 10,847
- Referee: Jerry Magallanes
- TV announcers (ESPN+): Jay Burnham (play-by-play) and Andy Gresh (analyst)
- Box Score Recap

Game information

First quarter

- (8:31) MASS - Jackson Paradis 1 Yd Run (Jacob Lurie Kick) (Drive: 10 plays, 56 yards, 5:15; UMass 7-0)

Second quarter

- (9:10) MASS - Jakobie Keeney-James 15 Yd pass from Taisun Phommachanh (Jacob Lurie Kick) (Drive: 7 plays, 82 yards, 3:41; UMass 14-0)
- (6:15) CCSU - Ricky Ortega 3 Yd Run (Jack Barnum Kick) (Drive: 5 plays, 75 yards, 2:55; UMass 14-7)
- (4:08) CCSU - Elijah Howard 1 Yd Run (Jack Barnum Kick) (Drive: 2 plays, 2 yards, 0:48; Tied 14-14)
- (0:39) MASS - Owen Anderson 2 Yd pass from Taisun Phommachanh (Jacob Lurie Kick) (Drive: 11 plays, 84 yards, 3:22; Umass 21-14)
- (0:07) CCSU - Elijah Howard 2 Yd pass from Brady Olson (Jack Barnum Kick) (Drive: 4 plays, 27 yards, 0:25; Tied 21-21)

Third quarter

- (10:12) CCSU - Paul Marsh Jr. 10 Yd pass from Brady Olson (Jack Barnum Kick) (Drive: 8 plays, 52 yards, 4:48; CCSU 28-21)
- (1:38) MASS - T.Y. Harding 57 Yd pass from Taisun Phommachanh (Jacob Lurie Kick) (Drive: 6 plays, 85 yards, 2:39; Tied 28-28)

Fourth quarter

- (14:11) CCSU - Jack Barnum 25 Yd Field Goal (Drive: 5 plays, 61 yards, 2:13; CCSU 31-28)
- (9:18) MASS - Brandon Campbell 3 Yd Run (Jacob Lurie Kick) (Drive: 10 plays, 75 yards, 4:53; UMass 35-31)

Statistics	CCSU	MASS
First downs	11	27
Total yards	247	450
Rushing yards	90	163
Passing yards	157	287
Passing: Comp–Att–Int	12-26-1	20-30-1
Time of possession	22:14	37:46

Team	Category	Player	Statistics
Central Connecticut	Passing	Brady Olson	12/26, 157 yards, 2 TD, INT
Central Connecticut	Rushing	Elijah Howard	14 carries, 46 yards, 1 TD
Central Connecticut	Receiving	Michael Plaskon	3 receptions, 65 yards
UMass	Passing	Taisun Phommachanh	20/30, 287 yards, 3 TD, INT
UMass	Rushing	Jalen John	13 carries, 65 yards
UMass	Receiving	Jakobie Kenney-James	5 receptions, 95 yards, 1 TD

=== at Yale ===
Game Five – Central Connecticut Blue Devils (2–2) at Yale Bulldogs (1–1) – Game summary

Quarter	1	2	3	4	Total
Blue Devils	3	7	6	6	22
Bulldogs	10	7	0	6	23

at Yale Bowl • New Haven, CT

- Date: Saturday October 5, 2024
- Game time: 12:00 p.m.
- Game weather: Sunny, 67 °F (19 °C)
- Game attendance: 5,123
- Referee: Alexander Rudolph
- TV announcers (ESPN+): Justin Gallanty (play-by-play) and Jack Siedlecki (analyst)
- Box Score Recap

Game information

First quarter

- (10:30) YALE - Nick Conforti 36 Yd Field Goal (Drive: 11 plays, 57 yards, 4:30; Yale 3-0)
- (5:25) CCSU - Jack Barnum 32 Yd Field Goal (Drive: 12 plays, 60 yards, 5:05; Tied 3-3)
- (1:29) YALE - Grant Jordan 4 Yd Run (Nick Conforti Kick) (Drive: 8 plays, 71 yards, 3:51; Yale 10-3)

Second quarter

- (13:02) CCSU - Jamir Robertson 49 Yd pass from Brady Olson (Jack Barnum Kick) (Drive: 9 plays, 85 yards, 3:21; Tied 10-10)
- (2:14) YALE - Joshua Pitsenberger 64 Yd Run (Nick Conforti Kick) (Drive: 7 plays, 99 yards, 3:28; Yale 17-10)

Third quarter

- (3:59) CCSU - Jack Barnum 38 Yd Field Goal (Drive: 7 plays, 60 yards, 3:39; Yale 17-13)
- (0:21) CCSU - Jack Barnum 42 Yd Field Goal (Drive: 7 plays, 35 yards, 3:01; Yale 17-16)

Fourth quarter

- (11:25) CCSU - Isaac Boston 19 Yd pass from Brady Olson (Two-Point Pass Conversion Failed) (Drive: 9 plays, 57 yards, 3:20; Central Connecticut 22-17)
- (8:15) YALE - Luke Foster 19 Yd pass from Grant Jordan (Two-Point Pass Conversion Failed) (Drive: 5 plays, 30 yards, 1:09; Yale 23-22)

Statistics	CCSU	YALE
First downs	24	18
Total yards	458	339
Rushing yards	170	193
Passing yards	288	146
Passing: Comp–Att–Int	17-31-2	16-31-0
Time of possession	34:31	25:29

Team	Category	Player	Statistics
Central Connecticut	Passing	Brady Olson	17/30, 288 yards, 2 TD, 2 INT
Central Connecticut	Rushing	Elijah Howard	25 carries, 108 yards
Central Connecticut	Receiving	Elijah Howard	5 receptions, 68 yards
Yale	Passing	Grant Jordan	16/31, 146 yards, 1 TD
Yale	Rushing	Joshua Pitsenberger	19 carries, 127 yards, 1 TD
Yale	Receiving	David Pantelis	4 receptions, 45 yards

=== Mercyhurst ===
Game Six – Mercyhurst Lakers (2–4) vs Central Connecticut Blue Devils (2–3) – Game summary

Quarter	1	2	3	4	Total
Lakers	7	0	7	6	20
Blue Devils	0	17	14	7	38

at Arute Field • New Britain, CT

- Date: Saturday October 12, 2024
- Game time: 12:00 p.m.
- Game weather: Sunny, 69 °F (21 °C)
- Game attendance: 3,167
- Referee: Lance Carlen
- TV announcers (NEC Front Row): Bruce Biel (play-by-play) and Marc Robbins (analyst)
- Box Score Recap

Game information

First quarter

- (5:58) MERC - Brian Trobel 22 Yd pass from Adam Urena (Nathan Nagucki Kick) (Drive: 8 plays, 78 yards, 4:31; Mercyhurst 7-0)

Second quarter

- (14:12) CCSU - Ricky Ortega 8 Yd Run (Jack Barnum Kick) (Drive: 13 plays, 73 yards, 6:43; Tied)
- (12:30) CCSU - Paul Marsh Jr. 10 Yd pass from Brady Olson (Jack Barnum Kick) (Drive: 3 plays, 11 yards, 1:28; Central Connecticut 14-7)
- (1:06) CCSU - Jack Barnum 22 Yd Field Goal (Drive: 12 plays, 76 yards, 6:10; Central Connecticut 17-7)

Third quarter

- (12:10) CCSU - Joe Crifasi 16 Yd pass from Brady Olson (Jack Barnum Kick) (Drive: 7 plays, 57 yards, 2:45; Central Connecticut 24-7)
- (6:00) CCSU - Paul Marsh Jr. 39 Yd pass from Brady Olson (Jack Barnum Kick) (Drive: 2 plays, 42 yards, 0:42; Central Connecticut 31-7)
- (0:31) MERC - Brian Trobel 3 Yd Run (Nathan Nagucki Kick) (Drive: 11 plays, 89 yards, 5:24; Central Connecticut 31-14)

Fourth quarter

- (10:23) MERC - Brian Trobel 14 Yd Run (Nathan Nagucki PAT failed) (Drive: 4 plays, 80 yards, 1:32; Central Connecticut 31-20)
- (1:39) CCSU - Jadon Turner 59 Yd Run (Jack Barnum Kick) (Drive: 8 plays, 84 yards, 4:27; Central Connecticut 38-20)

Statistics	MERC	CCSU
First downs	26	20
Total yards	303	425
Rushing yards	17	301
Passing yards	286	124
Passing: Comp–Att–Int	25-45-3	9-16-0
Time of possession	28:14	31:46

Team	Category	Player	Statistics
Mercyhurst	Passing	Adam Urena	25/45, 286 yards, 1 TD, 3 INT
Mercyhurst	Rushing	Earnest Davis	4 carries, 20 yards
Mercyhurst	Receiving	Cameron Barmore	8 receptions, 103 yards
Central Connecticut	Passing	Brady Olson	9/14, 124 yards, 3 TD
Central Connecticut	Rushing	Elijah Howard	27 carries, 169 yards
Central Connecticut	Receiving	Paul Marsh Jr.	4 receptions, 67 yards, 2 TD

=== at No. 22 Dartmouth ===
Game Seven – Central Connecticut Blue Devils (3–3) at No. 22 Dartmouth Big Green (4–0) – Game summary

Quarter	1	2	3	4	Total
Blue Devils	7	3	0	6	16
No. 22 Big Green	0	10	3	7	20

at Memorial Field • Hanover, NH

- Date: Saturday October 19, 2024
- Game time: 1:00 p.m.
- Game weather: Sunny, 55 °F (13 °C)
- Game attendance: 2,573
- Referee: Tom Zetts
- TV announcers (ESPN+): Matt Corsetti (play-by-play) and Chris Jared (analyst)
- Box Score Recap

Game information

First quarter

- (3:19) CCSU - Isaac Boston 12 Yd pass from Brady Olson (Jack Barnum Kick) (Drive: 14 plays, 68 yards, 6:51; Central Connecticut 7-0)

Second quarter

- (10:45) DART - Owen Zalc 22 Yd Field Goal (Drive: 14 plays, 71 yards, 7:34; Central Connecticut 7-3)
- (5:54) CCSU - Jack Barnum 24 Yd Field Goal (Drive: 11 plays, 68 yards, 4:51; Central Conncticut 10-3)
- (1:46) DART - Grayson Saunier 4 Yd Run (Owen Zalc Kick) (Drive: 12 plays, 78 yards, 4:03; Tied 10-10)

Third quarter

- (4:45) DART - Owen Zalc 36 Yd Field Goal (Drive: 12 plays, 64 yards, 6:35; Dartmouth 13-10)

Fourth quarter

- (12:34) CCSU - Jadon Turner 13 Yd Run (Jack Barnum PAT failed) (Drive: 7 plays, 66 yards, 3:42; Central Connecticut 16-13)
- (5:13) DART - Grayson Saunier 1 Yd Run (Owen Zalc Kick) (Drive: 9 plays, 32 yards, 3:53; Dartmouth 20-16)

Statistics	CCSU	DART
First downs	19	22
Total yards	317	315
Rushing yards	113	138
Passing yards	204	177
Passing: Comp–Att–Int	16-30-0	15-21-0
Time of possession	27:30	32:30

Team	Category	Player	Statistics
Central Connecticut	Passing	Brady Olson	15/29, 168 yards, 1 TD
Central Connecticut	Rushing	Jadon Turner	16 carries, 66 yards, 1 TD
Central Connecticut	Receiving	Dave Pardo	4 receptions, 67 yards
Dartmouth	Passing	Grayson Saunier	15/21, 177 yards
Dartmouth	Rushing	Q Jones	16 carries, 51 yards
Dartmouth	Receiving	Daniel Haughton	3 receptions, 55 yards

=== at LIU ===
Game Eight – Central Connecticut Blue Devils (3–4) vs LIU Sharks (1–7) – Game summary

Quarter	1	2	3	4	Total
Blue Devils	7	0	7	7	21
Sharks	3	14	0	7	24

at Bethpage Federal Credit Union Stadium • Brookville, New York

- Date: Saturday October 26, 2024
- Game time: 12:00 PM EST
- Game weather: Sunny, 62 °F (17 °C)
- Game attendance: 453
- Referee: Travis Barta
- TV announcers (ESPN+/NESN 360): Paul Dottino (play-by-play) and Kevin Gilbride (analyst)
- Box Score Recap

Game information

First quarter

- (9:49) CCSU - Jadon Turner 7 Yd Run (Jack Barnum Kick) (Drive: 6 plays, 34 yards, 2:56; Central Connecticut 7-0)
- (1:14) LIU - Michael Coney 23 Yd Field Goal (Drive: 14 plays, 69 yards, 8:35; Central Connecticut 7-3)

Second quarter

- (10:28) LIU - Cory Nichols 7 Yd pass from 99Ethan Greenwood00 (Michael Coney Kick) (Drive: 9 plays, 55 yards, 4:24; Long Island 10-7)
- (1:07) LIU - Pat Bowen 24 Yd pass from Ethan Greenwood (Michael Coney Kick) (Drive: 9 plays, 75 yards, 2:57; Long Island 17-7)

Third quarter

- (7:39) CCSU - Isaac Boston 15 Yd pass from Brady Olson (Jack Barnum Kick) (Drive: 17 plays, 75 yards, 7:14; Long Island 17-14)

Fourth quarter

- (10:34) CCSU - Brady Olson 8 Yd Run (Jack Barnum Kick) (Drive: 5 plays, 27 yards, 2:04; Central Connecticut 21-17)
- (7:58) LIU - Ethan Greenwood 26 Yd pass from Luca Stanzani (Michael Coney Kick) (Drive: 6 plays, 75 yards, 2:36; Long Island 24-21)

Statistics	CCSU	LIU
First downs	24	16
Total yards	335	297
Rushing yards	134	148
Passing yards	201	149
Passing: Comp–Att–Int	21-35-0	12-16-0
Time of possession	33:12	26:48

Team	Category	Player	Statistics
Central Connecticut	Passing	Brady Olson	20/34, 185 yards, 1 TD
Central Connecticut	Rushing	Brady Olson	9 carries, 46 yards
Central Connecticut	Receiving	Michael Plaskon	6 receptions, 67 yards
LIU	Passing	Ethan Greenwood	10/14, 120 yards, 2 TD
LIU	Rushing	Ethan Greenwood	18 carries, 66 yards
LIU	Receiving	Michael Love	6 receptions, 84 yards

=== Wagner ===
Game Nine – Wagner Seahawks (4–5) vs Central Connecticut Blue Devils (3–5) – Game summary

Quarter	1	2	3	4	Total
Seahwaks	7	0	0	7	14
Blue Devils	7	10	0	7	24

at Arute Field • New Britain, Connecticut

- Date: Saturday November 2, 2024
- Game time: 12:00 p.m.
- Game weather: Sunny
- Game attendance: 4,152
- Referee: Michael Bilica
- TV announcers (NEC Front Row): Bruce Biel (play-by-play) and Marc Robbins (analyst)
- Box Score Recap

Game information

First quarter

- (12:25) WAG - Rickey Spruill 81 Yd pass from Jake Cady (Matthew Schwindt Kick) (Drive: 1 play, 81 yards, 0:14; Wagner 7-0)
- (2:57) CCSU - Brady Olson 10 Yd Run (Jack Barnum Kick) (Drive: 10 plays, 63 yards, 4:56; Tied 7-7)

Second quarter

- (9:17) CCSU - Jack Barnum 30 Yd Field Goal (Drive: 12 plays, 56 yards, 6:22; Central Connecticut 10-7)
- (0:55) CCSU - Elijah Howard 8 Yd Run (Jack Barnum Kick) (Drive: 5 plays, 54 yards, 1:18; Central Connecticut 17-7)

Third quarter

- no scoring

Fourth quarter

- (12:10) WAG - Rickey Spruill 13 Yd Run (Matthew Schwindt Kick) (Drive: 10 plays, 78 yards, 2:50; Central Connecticut 17-14)
- (5:23) CCSU - Joe Crifasi 17 Yd pass from Brady Olson (Jack Barnum Kick) (Drive: 10 plays, 75 yards, 6:47; Central Connecticut 24-14)

Statistics	WAG	CCSU
First downs	15	19
Total yards	219	316
Rushing yards	24	134
Passing yards	195	182
Passing: Comp–Att–Int	13–27–0	16–27–0
Time of possession	26:50	33:10

Team	Category	Player	Statistics
Wagner	Passing	Jake Cady	13/27, 195 yards, 1 TD
Wagner	Rushing	Rickey Spruill	8 carries, 15 yards, 1 TD
Wagner	Receiving	Rickey Spruill	1 reception, 81 yards, 1 TD
Central Connecticut	Passing	Brady Olson	16/27, 182 yards, 1 TD
Central Connecticut	Rushing	Elijah Howard	21 carries, 75 yards, 1 TD
Central Connecticut	Receiving	Paul Marsh Jr.	3 receptions, 49 yards

=== at Stonehill ===
Game Ten – Central Connecticut Blue Devils (4–5) at Stonehill Skyhawks (1–7) – Game summary

Quarter	1	2	3	4	Total
Blue Devils	7	7	0	7	21
Skyhawks	0	3	14	0	17

at W.B. Mason Stadium • Easton, MA

- Date: Saturday November 9, 2024
- Game time: 1:00 p.m.
- Game weather: Sunny, 50 °F (10 °C)
- Game attendance: 1,674
- Referee: Michael Quinn
- TV announcers (NEC Front Row): Charlie Bergeron (play-by-play)
- Box Score Recap

Game information

First quarter

- (1:53) CCSU - Ricky Ortega 1 Yd Run (Jack Barnum Kick) (Drive: 18 plays, 75 yards, 10:17; Central Connecticut 7-0)

Second quarter

- (10:01) SHC - Danny Hurley 49 Yd Field Goal (Drive: 6 plays, 21 yards, 3:28; Central Connecticut 7-3)
- (1:58) CCSU - Elijah Howard 8 Yd Run (Jack Barnum Kick) (Drive: 15 plays, 73 yards, 8:06; Central Connecticut 14-3)

Third quarter

- (10:54) SHC - Jake Newsham 15 Yd pass from Jack O'Connell (Danny Hurley Kick) (Drive: 7 plays, 55 yards, 2:03; Central Connecticut 14-10)
- (2:54) SHC - Chase Miller 14 Yd pass from Jack O'Connell (Danny Hurley Kick) (Drive: 6 plays, 75 yards, 2:25; Stonehill 17-14)

Fourth quarter

- (8:54) CCSU - Donny Marcus 30 Yd pass from Brady Olson (Jack Barnum Kick) (Drive: 5 plays, 64 yards, 2:07; Central Connecticut 21-17)

Statistics	CCSU	STO
First downs	16	16
Total yards	285	256
Rushing yards	175	75
Passing yards	110	185
Passing: Comp–Att–Int	10-16-1	13-26-1
Time of possession	35:33	24:27

Team	Category	Player	Statistics
Central Connecticut	Passing	Brady Olson	10/16, 110 yards, 1 TD, INT
Central Connecticut	Rushing	Elijah Howard	20 carries, 70 yards, 1 TD
Central Connecticut	Receiving	Michael Plaskon	4 receptions, 41 yards
Stonehill	Passing	Jack O'Connell	11/20, 166 yards, 2 TD, INT
Stonehill	Rushing	Jarel Washington	10 carries, 33 yards
Stonehill	Receiving	Chase Miller	4 receptions, 70 yards, 1 TD

=== Robert Morris ===
Game Eleven – Robert Morris Colonials (6–4) vs Central Connecticut Blue Devils (5–5) – Game summary

Quarter	1	2	3	4	OT	2OT	Total
Colonials	3	14	7	3	0	6	33
Blue Devils	0	10	0	17	0	8	35

at Arute Field • New Britain, CT

- Date: Saturday November 16, 2024
- Game time: 12:00 PM EST
- Game weather: Sunny
- Game attendance: 3,192
- Referee: Travis Barta
- TV announcers (NEC Front Row): Bruce Biel (play-by-play) and Mark Robbins (analyst)
- Box Score Recap

Game information

First quarter

- (4:13) RMU – Jayson Jenkins 23-yard field goal (Drive: 15 plays, 72 yards, 7:48; Robert Morris 3–0)

Second quarter

- (10:31) CCSU – Donny Marcus 2-yard run, Jack Barnum kick (Drive: 7 plays, 85 yards, 3:40; Central Connecticut 7–3)
- (10:17) RMU – Rob Carter Jr. 92 yard kickoff return, Jayson Jenkins kick (Robert Morris 10–7)
- (8:06) RMU – Rob Carter Jr. 50-yard interception, Jayson Jenkins kick (Robert Morris 17–7)
- (0:37) CCSU – Jack Barnum 19-yard field goal (Drive: 14 plays, 80 yards, 4:24; Robert Morris 17–10)

Third quarter

- (7:44) RMU – Carl Smith Jr. 19-yard pass from Anthony Chiccitt, Jayson Jenkins kick (Drive: 4 plays, 53 yards, 1:39; Robert Morris 24–10)

Fourth quarter

- (10:00) CCSU – Peter Cleary 5-yard pass from Brady Olson, Jack Barnum kick (Drive: 11 plays, 64 yards, 5:00; Robert Morris 24–17)
- (7:26) CCSU – Christopher Jean 49-yard fumble recovery, Jack Barnum kick (Tied 24–24)
- (1:13) CCSU – Jack Barnum 20-yard field goal (Drive: 4 plays, 9 yards, 0:38; Central Connecticut 27–24)
- (0:00) RMU – Jayson Jenkins 45-yard field goal (Drive: 8 plays, 38 yards, 1:06; Tied 27–27)

Overtime

- (0:00) RMU – Noah Robinson 18-yard pass from Zach Tanner (Drive: 3 plays, 25 yards, 0:00; Robert Morris 33–27)

Double overtime

- (0:00) CCSU – Elijah Howard 12-yard run, Isaac Boston pass (Drive: 6 plays, 25 yards, 0:00; Central Connecticut 35–33)

Statistics	RMU	CCSU
First downs	16	16
Total yards	304	291
Rushing yards	160	107
Passing yards	144	184
Passing: Comp–Att–Int	15–29–1	12–34–2
Time of possession	32:52	27:04

Team	Category	Player	Statistics
Robert Morris	Passing	Anthony Chiccitt	13/21, 120 yards, TD
Robert Morris	Rushing	DJ Moyer	17 carries, 82 yards
Robert Morris	Receiving	Noah Robinson	4 receptions, 60 yards, TD
Central Connecticut	Passing	Brady Olson	12/34, 184 yards, TD, 2 INT
Central Connecticut	Rushing	Elijah Howard	21 carries, 66 yards, TD
Central Connecticut	Receiving	Michael Plaskon	3 receptions, 48 yards

=== No. 19 Duquesne ===
Game Twelve – No. 19 Duquesne Dukes (8–2) vs Central Connecticut Blue Devils (6–5) – Game summary

Quarter	1	2	3	4	Total
No. 19 Dukes	0	7	7	0	14
Blue Devils	0	13	0	8	21

at Arute Field • New Britain, CT

- Date: Saturday November 23, 2024
- Game time: 12:00 PM EST
- Game weather: Rain
- Game attendance: 3,707
- Referee: Michael Davis
- TV announcers (NEC Front Row): Bruce Biel (play-by-play) and Mark Robbins (analyst)
- Box Score Recap

Game information

First quarter

- no scoring

Second quarter

- (10:17) CCSU – Jack Barnum 47 Yd Field Goal (Drive: 7 plays, 19 yards, 2:13; Central Connecticut 3-0)
- (7:58) DUQ – Joey Isabella 36 Yd pass from Darius Perrantes (Brian Bruzdewicz Kick) (Drive: 5 plays, 75 yards, 2:19; Duquesne 7-3)
- (6:42) CCSU – Elijah Howard 4 Yd Run (Jack Barnum Kick) (Drive: 3 plays, 69 yards, 1:10; Central Connecticut 10-7)
- (0:04) CCSU – Jack Barnum 24 Yd Field Goal (Drive: 7 plays, 42 yards, 0:53; Central Connecticut 13-7)

Third quarter

- (14:46) DUQ – Joey Isabella 85 Yd pass from Darius Perrantes (Brian Bruzdewicz Kick) (Drive: 1 play, 85 yards, 0:14; Duquesne 14-13)

Fourth quarter

- (13:44) CCSU – Elijah Howard 6 Yd Run (Elijah Howard Pass to Brady Olson for Two-Point Conversion) (Drive: 4 plays, 32 yards, 1:07; Central Connecticut 21-14)

Statistics	DUQ	CCSU
First downs	15	17
Total yards	358	342
Rushing yards	62	126
Passing yards	296	216
Passing: Comp–Att–Int	17–34–7	15–35–1
Time of possession	25:33	34:27

Team	Category	Player	Statistics
Duquesne	Passing	Darius Perrantes	17/33, 296 yards, 2 TD, 7 INT
Duquesne	Rushing	Taj Butts	12 carries, 41 yards
Duquesne	Receiving	Joey Isabella	5 receptions, 149 yards, 2 TD
Central Connecticut	Passing	Brady Olson	15/34, 216 yards, INT
Central Connecticut	Rushing	Elijah Howard	25 carries, 110 yards, 2 TD
Central Connecticut	Receiving	Isaac Boston	6 receptions, 83 yards

=== at No. 10 Rhode Island (NCAA Division I playoff–first round) ===
Game Thirteen – Central Connecticut Blue Devils (7–5) at No. 10 Rhode Island Rams (10–2) – Game summary

Quarter	1	2	3	4	Total
Blue Devils	0	7	7	3	17
No. 10 Rams	14	0	0	7	21

at Meade Stadium • Kingston, RI

- Date: Saturday November 30, 2024
- Game time: 12:00 PM EST
- Game weather: Sunny
- Game attendance: 3,522
- Referee: Matthew Jones
- TV announcers (ESPN+): Doug Sherman (play-by-play) and Forrest Conoly (analyst)
- Box Score Recap

Game information

First quarter

- (2:31) URI – Tommy Smith 38-yard pass from Hunter Helms (Ty Groff kick) (Drive: 8 plays, 80 yards, 3:36; Rhode Island 7–0)
- (2:17) URI – Emmanuel Gomes 42-yard interception return (Ty Groff kick) (Drive: 1 play, 0 yards, 0:10; Rhode Island 14–0)

Second quarter

- (7:25) CCSU – Isaac Boston 11-yard pass from Brady Olson (Jack Barnum kick) (Drive: 8 plays, 48 yards, 4:06; Rhode Island 14–7)

Third quarter

- (1:27) CCSU – Isaac Boston 6-yard pass from Brady Olson (Jack Barnum kick) (Drive: 6 plays, 75 yards, 3:25; Tied 14–14)

Fourth quarter

- (9:42) URI – Tommy Smith 6-yard run (Ty Groff kick) (Drive: 6 plays, 32 yards, 3:21; Rhode Island 21–14)
- (4:47) CCSU – Jack Barnum 32-yard field goal (Drive: 8 plays, 58 yards, 4:51; Rhode Island 21–17)

Statistics	CCSU	URI
First downs	13	19
Total yards	271	434
Rushing yards	123	226
Passing yards	148	208
Passing: Comp–Att–Int	11–23–3	18–28–2
Time of possession	28:21	31:39

Team	Category	Player	Statistics	
Central Connecticut	Passing	Passing	Brady Olson	11/23, 148 yards, 2 TD, 3 INT
Central Connecticut	Rushing	Rushing	Elijah Howard	19 carries, 101 yards
Central Connecticut	Receiving	Receiving	Elijah Howard	3 receptions, 54 yards
Rhode Island	Passing	Passing	Hunter Helms	18/28, 208 yards, TD, 2 INT
Rhode Island	Rushing	Rushing	Malik Grant	29 carries, 223 yards
Rhode Island	Receiving	Receiving	Greg Gaines III	5 receptions, 71 yards
