= 2024 Saint Francis Red Flash football team =

American college football season

2024 Saint Francis Red Flash football
- Conference: Northeast Conference
- Record: 4–7 (2–4 NEC)
- Head coach: Chris Villarrial (14th season)
- Offensive coordinator: Marco Pecora (5th season)
- Defensive coordinator: Jacob Craig (1st season)
- Home stadium: DeGol Field

2024 Northeast Conference football standings
	Conf.			Overall
Team	W		L	W		L
Central Connecticut +^	5	–	1	7	–	6
Duquesne +	5	–	1	8	–	3
Robert Morris	4	–	2	7	–	5
LIU	3	–	3	4	–	8
Wagner	2	–	4	4	–	8
Saint Francis (PA)	2	–	4	4	–	7
Mercyhurst*	0	–	0	4	–	7
Stonehill*	0	–	6	1	–	10
+ – Conference co-champions; ^ – FCS playoff participant; * – Stonehill and Mercyhurst are ineligible for NEC title and FCS postseason play due to transition from NCAA Division II.; Rankings from STATS Poll

The 2024 Saint Francis Red Flash football team represented Saint Francis University as a member of the Northeast Conference (NEC) during the 2024 NCAA Division I FCS football season. The Red Flash were led by 14th-year head coach Chris Villarrial, and played home games at DeGol Field in Loretto, Pennsylvania.

== Schedule ==
Date	Time	Opponent	Site	TV	Result	Attendance
August 31	12:00 p.m.	at Dayton*	Welcome Stadium; Dayton, OH	Facebook Live	L 10–18	2,850
September 7	2:30 p.m.	at Kent State*	Dix Stadium; Kent, OH	ESPN+	W 23–17	11,585
September 14	12:00 p.m.	Central Connecticut	DeGol Field; Loretto, PA	NEC Front Row	L 20–27	2,616
September 21	2:00 p.m.	at Eastern Michigan*	Rynearson Stadium; Ypsilanti, MI	ESPN+	L 0–36	15,509
October 5	1:00 p.m.	at Delaware State*	Alumni Stadium; Dover, DE	ESPN+	W 28–17	5,400
October 12	12:00 p.m.	Duquesne	DeGol Field; Loretto, PA	ESPN+	L 7–38	1,799
October 19	12:00 p.m.	at Wagner	Wagner College Stadium; Staten Island, NY	NEC Front Row	L 0–14	2,785
October 26	2:00 p.m.	at Robert Morris	Joe Walton Stadium; Moon Township, PA	NEC Front Row	L 0–17	2,657
November 2	1:00 p.m.	Stonehill^{†}	DeGol Field; Loretto, PA	NEC Front Row	W 34–0	5,400
November 16	12:00 p.m.	at LIU	Bethpage Federal Credit Union Stadium; Brookville, NY	NEC Front Row	W 34–27	684
November 23	1:00 p.m.	at Mercyhurst	Saxon Stadium; Erie, PA	NEC Front Row	L 20–21	826
*Non-conference game; ^{†}Homecoming; All times are in Eastern time

== Game summaries ==
=== at Dayton ===
Game One – Saint Francis Red Flash (0–0) at Dayton Flyers (0–0) – Game summary

Quarter	1	2	3	4	Total
Red Flash	0	3	7	0	10
Flyers	9	0	9	0	18

at Welcome Stadium • Dayton, OH

- Date: August 31, 2024
- Game time: 12:06 pm
- Game weather: Cloudy, 80 °F (27 °C)
- Game attendance: 2,850
- Referee: John Shay
- TV announcers (Facebook Live): TBD
- Box Score (SFU) Recap (SFU)

Game information

First quarter

- 7:51 DAY - Gavin Lochow 12-yard pass from Drew VanVleet (Danny Baker kick), (Drive: 11 plays, 28 yards, 5:55; Dayton 7–0)
- 0:59 DAY - 0-yard safety ; (Dayton 9–0)

Second quarter

- 6:25 SFU - Mac Plummer 26-yard field goal (Drive: 4 plays, 4 yards, 1:28; Dayton 9–3)

Third quarter

- 11:04 DAY - Luke Brenner 27-yard pass from Gavin Lochow, (Drive: 8 plays, 74 yards, 3:54; Dayton 15–3)
- 5:24 SFU - Markell Holman 1-yard run (Mac Plummer kick), (Drive: 6 plays, 36 yards, 2:26; Dayton 15–10)
- 0:07 DAY - Danny Baker 44-yard field goal, (Drive: 11 plays, 36 yards, 5:09; Dayton 18–10)

Fourth quarter

- No scoring

Statistics	SFPA	DAY
First downs	13	16
Total yards	247	196
Rushing yards	126	40
Passing yards	121	156
Passing: Comp–Att–Int	15–26–0	16–23–0
Time of possession	24:46	35:14

Team	Category	Player	Statistics
Saint Francis (PA)	Passing	Nick Whitfield, Jr.	15/26, 121 yards
Saint Francis (PA)	Rushing	DeMarcus McElroy	9 carries, 69 yards
Saint Francis (PA)	Receiving	Gavin Thomson	3 receptions, 44 yards
Dayton	Passing	Drew VanVleet	15/22, 129 yards, 1 TD
Dayton	Rushing	Mason Hackett	18 carries, 60 yards
Dayton	Receiving	Gavin Lochow	8 receptions, 55 yards, 1 TD

=== at Kent State (FBS) ===
Game Two – Saint Francis Red Flash (0–1) at Kent State Golden Flashes (FBS) (0–1) – Game summary

Quarter	1	2	3	4	Total
Red Flash	10	10	3	0	23
Golden Flashes (FBS)	0	14	0	3	17

at Dix Stadium • Kent, OH

- Date: September 7, 2024
- Game time: 2:30 pm
- Game weather: Sunny • Temperature: 60 °F (16 °C) • Wind: NW at 14 miles per hour (23 km/h)
- Game attendance: 11,585
- Referee: Rich Edwards
- TV announcers (ESPN+): Anthony Lima (play-by-play) and Randy Buffington (analyst)

Game information

First quarter

- (9:53) SFU - Mac Plummer 50-yard Plummer field goal, 8 plays, 52 yards, TOP 03:28 (Saint Francis 3–0)
- (3:46) SFU - Jeff Hoenstine 2-yard run (Mac Plummer Kick), 5 plays, 41 yards, TOP 02:18 (Saint Francis 10–0)

Second quarter

- (10:56) SFU - Gavin Thomson 64-yard pass from Jeff Hoenstine (Mac Plummer Kick), 5 plays, 85 yards, TOP 02:37 (Saint Francis 17–0)
- (5:59) KSU - Chrishon McCray 9 Yd pass from Tommy Ulatowski (Andrew Glass Kick), 10 plays, 54 yards, TOP 04:49 (Saint Francis 17–7)
- (1:56) SFU - Mac Plummer 33-yard field goal, 11 plays, 60 yards, TOP 04:03 (Saint Francis 20–7)
- (0:46) KSU - Luke Floriea 23-yard pass from Devin Kargman (Andrew Glass Kick), 8 plays, 68 yards, TOP 01:05 (Saint Francis 20–14)

Third quarter

- (11:30) SFU - Mac Plummer 46-yard field goal 8 plays, 47 yards, TOP 03:30 (Saint Francis 23–14)

Fourth quarter

- (1:38) KSU - Andrew Glass 44-yard field goal 7 plays, 55 yards, TOP 01:26 (Saint Francis 23–17)

Statistics	SFPA	KENT
First downs	16	16
Total yards	402	280
Rushing yards	207	78
Passing yards	195	202
Passing: Comp–Att–Int	11–22–0	23–39–1
Time of possession	34:24	25:36

Team	Category	Player	Statistics
Saint Francis (PA)	Passing	Jeff Hoenstine	11/22, 195 yards, TD
Saint Francis (PA)	Rushing	DeMarcus McElroy	20 carries, 81 yards
Saint Francis (PA)	Receiving	Gavin Thomson	5 receptions, 124 yards, TD
Kent State	Passing	Devin Kargman	22/38, 193 yards, TD, INT
Kent State	Rushing	Ky Thomas	11 carries, 39 yards
Kent State	Receiving	Luke Floriea	6 receptions, 92 yards, TD

=== Central Connecticut ===
Game Three – Central Connecticut Blue Devils (1–1) at Saint Francis Red Flash (1–1) – Game summary

Quarter	1	2	3	4	Total
Blue Devils	6	14	0	7	27
Red Flash	7	7	6	0	20

at DeGol Field • Loretto, PA

- Date: September 14, 2024
- Game time: 12:00 pm
- Game weather: Partly Cloudy, 69 °F (21 °C)
- Game attendance: 2,616
- Referee: Michael Quinn
- TV announcers (NEC Front Row): Pat Farabaugh (play-by-play) and Jay Roberts (analyst)

Game information

First quarter

- (11:12) CCSU - Jack Barnum 39-yard Field Goal (Drive:10 plays, 34 yards, 3:43; Central Connecticut 3-0)
- (10:04) CCSU - Jack Barnum 40-yard Field Goal (Drive:4 plays, 1 yard, 1:01; Central Connecticut 6-0)
- (9:50) SFU - DaMario Crawford 94-yard Kickoff Return (Mac Plummer Kick) (Saint Francis 7-6)

Second quarter

- (12:39) CCSU - Brady Olson 7-yard Run (Jack Barnum Kick) (Drive: 12 plays, 80 yards, 4:42; Central Connecticut 13-7)
- (7:21) SFU - DeMarcus McElroy 97-yard Run (Mac Plummer Kick) (Drive: 1 play, 97 yards, 0:15; Saint Francis 14-13)
- (0:25) CCSU - Michael Plaskon 11-yard pass from Brady Olson (Jack Barnum Kick) (Drive: 8 plays, 51 yards, 1:48; Central Connecticut 20-14)

Third quarter

- (5:32) SFU - Fran Brown Jr. 0-yard Fumble Return (Mac Plummer PAT failed) (Drive: 4 plays, 97 yards, 2:04; Tied 20-20)

Fourth quarter

- (1:45) CCSU - Kimal Clark 10-yard Fumble Return (Jack Barnum Kick) (Drive: 3 plays, 89 yards, 0:21; Central Connecticut 27-20)

Statistics	CCSU	SFPA
First downs	19	12
Total yards	297	248
Rushing yards	115	103
Passing yards	182	145
Passing: Comp–Att–Int	22–43–1	20–25–0
Time of possession	30:30	29:30

Team	Category	Player	Statistics
Central Connecticut	Passing	Brady Olson	21/42, 163 yards, TD
Central Connecticut	Rushing	Elijah Howard	23 carries, 102 yards
Central Connecticut	Receiving	Michael Plaskon	6 receptions, 53 yards, TD
Saint Francis (PA)	Passing	Jeff Hoenstine	12/16, 112 yards, INT
Saint Francis (PA)	Rushing	DeMarcus McElroy	9 carries, 124 yards, TD
Saint Francis (PA)	Receiving	Jayden Ivory	5 receptions, 47 yards

=== at Eastern Michigan (FBS) ===
Game Four – Saint Francis Red Flash (1–2) vs Eastern Michigan Eagles (FBS) (2–1) – Game summary

Quarter	1	2	3	4	Total
Red Flash	0	0	0	0	0
Eagles (FBS)	10	3	16	7	36

at Rynearson Stadium, Ypsilanti, Michigan

- Date: Saturday September 21, 2024
- Game time: 2:00 PM
- TV announcers (ESPN+): Anthony Lima (play-by-play) and Je'Rod Cherry (analyst)

Game information

First quarter

- EMU – David Carter Jr. 99-yard fumble return (Jesus Gomez kick) 4:33. Eagles 7–0. Drive: 14 plays, 79 yards, 7:28.
- EMU – Jesus Gomez 40-yard field goal, 0:44. Eagles 10–0. Drive: 7 plays, 31 yards, 2:08.

Second quarter

- EMU – Jesus Gomez 49-yard field goal, 6:46. Eagles 13–0. Drive: 12 plays, 38 yards, 5:50.

Third quarter

- EMU – Delbert Mimms III 1-yard run (kick failed) 9:12. Eagles 19–0. Drive: 6 plays, 44 yards, 2:23.
- EMU – Kendric Nowling 0-yard blocked punt return (Jesus Gomez kick) 7:38. Eagles 26–0. Drive: 3 plays, -7 yards, 1:34.
- EMU – Jesus Gomez 37-yard field goal, 6:03. Eagles 29–0. Drive: 4 plays, 0 yards, 0:45.

Fourth quarter

- EMU – Zyell Griffin 89-yard pass from Jeremiah Salem (Jesus Gomez kick) 11:20. Eagles 36–0. Drive: 6 plays, 94 yards, 3:28.

Statistics	SFPA	EMU
First downs	14	17
Total yards	154	327
Rushing yards	43	124
Passing yards	111	203
Passing: Comp–Att–Int	15-27-1	14-24-0
Time of possession	30:22	29:38

Team	Category	Player	Statistics
Saint Francis	Passing	Adrian Mejia	15/27, 111 yards, INT
Saint Francis	Rushing	Adrian Mejia	17 carries, 20 yards
Saint Francis	Receiving	Jayden Ivory	3 receptions, 42 yards
Eastern Michigan	Passing	Jeremiah Salem	5/5, 102 yards, TD
Eastern Michigan	Rushing	Deion Brown	6 carries, 33 yards
Eastern Michigan	Receiving	Zyell Griffin	1 reception, 89 yards, TD

=== at Delaware State ===
Game Five – Saint Francis Red Flash (1–3) vs Delaware State Hornets (1–4) – Game summary

Quarter	1	2	3	4	Total
Red Flash	0	0	0	0	0
Hornets	0	0	0	0	0

at Alumni Stadium, Dover, Delaware

- Date: Saturday October 5, 2024
- Game time: 1:00 PM

Game information

First quarter
Second quarter
Third quarter
Fourth quarter

Statistics	SFPA	DSU
First downs		
Total yards		
Rushing yards		
Passing yards		
Passing: Comp–Att–Int		
Time of possession		

Team	Category	Player	Statistics
Saint Francis	Passing		
Saint Francis	Rushing		
Saint Francis	Receiving		
Delaware State	Passing		
Delaware State	Rushing		
Delaware State	Receiving		

=== Duquesne ===
Game Six – Duquesne Dukes (3–2) at Saint Francis Red Flash (2–3) – Game summary

Quarter	1	2	3	4	Total
Dukes	0	0	0	0	0
Red Flash	0	0	0	0	0

at DeGol Field • Loretto, PA

- Date: Saturday October 12, 2024
- Game time: 12:00 pm
- Game weather: 0 °F (−18 °C)
- TV announcers (ESPN+): TBD

Game information

First quarter
Second quarter
Third quarter
Fourth quarter

Statistics	DUQ	SFPA
First downs		
Total yards		
Rushing yards		
Passing yards		
Passing: Comp–Att–Int		
Time of possession		

Team	Category	Player	Statistics
Duquesne	Passing		
Duquesne	Rushing		
Duquesne	Receiving		
Saint Francis (PA)	Passing		
Saint Francis (PA)	Rushing		
Saint Francis (PA)	Receiving		

=== at Wagner ===
Game Seven – Saint Francis Red Flash (2–4) vs Wagner Seahawks (3–4) – Game summary

Quarter	1	2	3	4	Total
Red Flash	0	0	0	0	0
Seahawks	0	0	0	0	0

at Wagner College Stadium, Staten Island, New York

- Date: Saturday October 19, 2024
- Game time: 12:00 PM
- TV: NEC Front Row

Game information

First quarter
Second quarter
Third quarter
Fourth quarter

Statistics	SHU	WAG
First downs		
Total yards		
Rushing yards		
Passing yards		
Passing: Comp–Att–Int		
Time of possession		

Team	Category	Player	Statistics
Saint Francis (PA)	Passing		
Saint Francis (PA)	Rushing		
Saint Francis (PA)	Receiving		
Wagner	Passing		
Wagner	Rushing		
Wagner	Receiving		

=== at Robert Morris ===
Game Eight – Saint Francis Red Flash (2–5) vs Robert Morris Colonials (4–3) – Game summary

Quarter	1	2	3	4	Total
Red Flash	0	0	0	0	0
Colonials	0	0	0	0	0

at Joe Walton Stadium, Moon Township, Pennsylvania

- Date: Saturday October 26, 2024
- Game time: 2:00 PM
- TV: NEC Front Row

Game information

First quarter
Second quarter
Third quarter
Fourth quarter

Statistics	SFPA	RMU
First downs		
Total yards		
Rushing yards		
Passing yards		
Passing: Comp–Att–Int		
Time of possession		

Team	Category	Player	Statistics
Saint Francis (PA)	Passing		
Saint Francis (PA)	Rushing		
Saint Francis (PA)	Receiving		
Robert Morris	Passing		
Robert Morris	Rushing		
Robert Morris	Receiving		

=== Stonehill ===
Game Nine – Stonehill Skyhawks (1–6) at Saint Francis Red Flash (2–6) – Game summary

Quarter	1	2	3	4	Total
Skyhawks	0	0	0	0	0
Red Flash	0	0	0	0	0

at DeGol Field • Loretto, PA

- Date: Saturday November 2, 2024
- Game time: 12:00 pm
- Game weather: 0 °F (−18 °C)
- TV announcers (NEC Front Row): TBD

Game information

First quarter
Second quarter
Third quarter
Fourth quarter

Statistics	STO	SFPA
First downs		
Total yards		
Rushing yards		
Passing yards		
Passing: Comp–Att–Int		
Time of possession		

Team	Category	Player	Statistics
Stonehill	Passing		
Stonehill	Rushing		
Stonehill	Receiving		
Saint Francis (PA)	Passing		
Saint Francis (PA)	Rushing		
Saint Francis (PA)	Receiving		

=== at LIU ===
Game Ten – Saint Francis Red Flash (3–6) vs LIU Sharks (4–7) – Game summary

Quarter	1	2	3	4	Total
Red Flash	0	0	0	0	0
Sharks	0	0	0	0	0

at Bethpage Federal Credit Union Stadium • Brookville, New York

- Date: Saturday November 16, 2024
- Game time: 12:00 PM EST
- Game weather: 0 °F (−18 °C)
- TV announcers (NEC Front Row): TBD

Game information

First quarter
Second quarter
Third quarter
Fourth quarter

Statistics	SFPA	LIU
First downs		
Total yards		
Rushing yards		
Passing yards		
Passing: Comp–Att–Int		
Time of possession		

Team	Category	Player	Statistics
Saint Francis (PA)	Passing		
Saint Francis (PA)	Rushing		
Saint Francis (PA)	Receiving		
LIU	Passing		
LIU	Rushing		
LIU	Receiving		

=== at Mercyhurst ===
Game Eleven – Saint Francis Red Flash (0–0) vs Mercyhurst Lakers (0–0) – Game summary

Quarter	1	2	3	4	Total
Red Flash	0	0	0	0	0
Lakers	0	0	0	0	0

at Saxon Stadium • Erie, PA

- Date: Saturday November 23, 2024
- Game time: 1:00 PM EST
- Game weather: 0 °F (−18 °C)
- TV announcers (NEC Front Row): TBD

Game information

First quarter
Second quarter
Third quarter
Fourth quarter

Statistics	SFPA	MERC
First downs		
Total yards		
Rushing yards		
Passing yards		
Passing: Comp–Att–Int		
Time of possession		

Team	Category	Player	Statistics
Saint Francis (PA)	Passing		
Saint Francis (PA)	Rushing		
Saint Francis (PA)	Receiving		
Mercyhurst	Passing		
Mercyhurst	Rushing		
Mercyhurst	Receiving		
