= 2024 Stonehill Skyhawks football team =

American college football season

2024 Stonehill Skyhawks football
- Conference: Northeast Conference
- Record: 1–10 (0–6 NEC)
- Head coach: Eli Gardner (8th season)
- Offensive coordinator: Tyler Moody (8th season)
- Defensive coordinator: Kyle Jones (4th season)
- Home stadium: W.B. Mason Stadium

2024 Northeast Conference football standings
	Conf.			Overall
Team	W		L	W		L
Central Connecticut +^	5	–	1	7	–	6
Duquesne +	5	–	1	8	–	3
Robert Morris	4	–	2	7	–	5
LIU	3	–	3	4	–	8
Wagner	2	–	4	4	–	8
Saint Francis (PA)	2	–	4	4	–	7
Mercyhurst*	0	–	0	4	–	7
Stonehill*	0	–	6	1	–	10
+ – Conference co-champions; ^ – FCS playoff participant; * – Stonehill and Mercyhurst are ineligible for NEC title and FCS postseason play due to transition from NCAA Division II.; Rankings from STATS Poll

The 2024 Stonehill Skyhawks football team represented Stonehill College as a member of the Northeast Conference (NEC) during the 2024 NCAA Division I FCS football season. The Skyhawks were led by eighth-year head coach Eli Gardner, and played their home games at W.B. Mason Stadium. Stonehill was ineligible for the NEC title and FCS postseason play due to their ongoing transition from NCAA Division II.

== Schedule ==
Date	Time	Opponent	Site	TV	Result	Attendance
September 7	3:30 p.m.	at Stony Brook*	Kenneth P. LaValle Stadium; Stony Brook, NY	FloSports	L 10–37	8,062
September 14	6:00 p.m.	at New Hampshire*	Wildcat Stadium; Durham, NH	FloSports	L 6–45	6,795
September 21	1:00 p.m.	Sacred Heart*	W.B. Mason Stadium; Easton, MA	NEC Front Row	W 35–21	2,400
October 5	1:00 p.m.	Wagner	W.B. Mason Stadium; Easton, MA	ESPN+, NESN 360	L 7–28	1,643
October 12	12:00 p.m.	at LIU	Bethpage Federal Credit Union Stadium; Brookville, NY	NEC Front Row	L 7–31	1,257
October 19	1:00 p.m.	at Merrimack*	Duane Stadium; North Andover, MA	NESN+/ESPN+	L 28–48	3,362
October 26	1:00 p.m.	Duquesne^{†}	W.B. Mason Stadium; Easton, MA	NEC Front Row	L 34–48	1,117
November 2	1:00 p.m.	at Saint Francis (PA)	DeGol Field; Loretto, PA	NEC Front Row	L 0–34	5,400
November 9	1:00 p.m.	Central Connecticut	W.B. Mason Stadium; Easton, MA	NEC Front Row	L 17–21	1,674
November 16	12:30 p.m.	at Lafayette*	Fisher Stadium; Easton, PA	ESPN+	L 10–42	2,856
November 23	12:00 p.m.	at Robert Morris	Joe Walton Stadium; Moon Township, PA	NEC Front Row	L 13–31	862
*Non-conference game; ^{†}Homecoming; All times are in Eastern time

== Game summaries ==
=== at Stony Brook ===
Game One – Stonehill Skyhawks (0–0) vs Stony Brook Seawolves (0–1) – Game summary

Quarter	1	2	3	4	Total
Skyhawks	0	0	10	0	10
Seawolves	17	6	14	0	37

at Kenneth P. LaValle Stadium, Stony Brook, NY

- Date: Saturday September 7, 2024
- Game time: 3:30 PM
- Game weather: Sunny
- Game attendance: 8,062
- Referee: Cory Hansen
- TV announcers (FloSports): Jonny Wincott (play-by-play), Brandon London (analyst) and Nick DeLuca (sideline)

Game information

First quarter

- (13:06) SBU – Roland Dempster 17-yard run, Enda Kirby kick (Drive: 6 plays, 75 yards, 1:54; Stony Brook 7–0)
- (11:18) SBU – Roland Dempster 15-yard run, Enda Kirby kick (Drive: 2 plays, 30 yards, 0:27; Stony Brook 14–0)
- (6:43) SBU – Enda Kirby 40-yard field goal (Drive: 8 plays, 16 yards, 3:07; Stony Brook 17–0)

Second quarter

- (2:10) SBU – Cole Bunicci 63-yard pass from Malachi Marshall (Drive: 4 plays, 81 yards, 1:36; Stony Brook 23–0)

Third quarter

- (11:34) SHC – Danny Hurley 21-yard field goal (Drive: 10 plays, 71 yards, 3:26; Stony Brook 23–3)
- (7:52) SBU – Roland Dempster 3-yard run, Enda Kirby kick (Drive: 8 plays, 75 yards, 3:36; Stony Brook 30–3)
- (5:45) SBU – Sebastian Regis 69-yard fumble recovery, Enda Kirby kick (Stony Brook 37–3)
- (4:04) SHC – Cole Clark 3-yard pass from Ashur Carraha, Danny Hurley kick (Drive: 4 plays, 5 yards, 1:30; Stony Brook 37–10)

Fourth quarter

No scoring plays

Statistics	STO	STBK
First downs	21	20
Total yards	382	421
Rushing yards	146	260
Passing yards	236	161
Passing: Comp–Att–Int	18–36–2	9–16–0
Time of possession	29:26	29:06

Team	Category	Player	Statistics
Stonehill	Passing	Ashur Carraha	18/36, 236 yards, 2 INT, TD
Stonehill	Rushing	Ashur Carraha	10 carries, 70 yards
Stonehill	Receiving	Cody Ruff	6 receptions, 105 yards
Stony Brook	Passing	Malachi Marshall	9/16, 161 yards, 1 TD
Stony Brook	Rushing	Roland Dempster	19 carries, 160 yards, 3 TD
Stony Brook	Receiving	Cole Bunicci	1 reception, 63 yards, 1 TD

=== at New Hampshire ===
Game Two – Stonehill Skyhawks (0–1) vs New Hampshire Wildcats (1–1) – Game summary

Quarter	1	2	3	4	Total
Skyhawks	6	0	0	0	6
Wildcats	14	14	17	0	45

at Wildcat Stadium, Durham, NH

- Date: Saturday September 14, 2024
- Game time: 6:00 PM
- TV: FloSports

Game information

First quarter
Second quarter
Third quarter
Fourth quarter

Statistics	STO	UNH
First downs	10	24
Total yards	252	541
Rushing yards	175	102
Passing yards	77	439
Passing: Comp–Att–Int	7–23–1	25–35–0
Time of possession	30:10	29:50

Team	Category	Player	Statistics
Stonehill	Passing		
Stonehill	Rushing		
Stonehill	Receiving		
New Hampshire	Passing		
New Hampshire	Rushing		
New Hampshire	Receiving		

=== Sacred Heart ===
Game Three – Sacred Heart Pioneers (2–1) vs Stonehill Skyhawks (0–2) – Game summary

Quarter	1	2	3	4	Total
Pioneers	0	0	0	0	0
Skyhawks	0	0	0	0	0

at W.B. Mason Stadium • Easton, MA

- Date: Saturday September 21, 2024
- Game time: 1:00 p.m.
- TV: NEC Front Row

Game information

First quarter
Second quarter
Third quarter
Fourth quarter

Statistics	SHU	STO
First downs		
Total yards		
Rushing yards		
Passing yards		
Passing: Comp–Att–Int		
Time of possession		

Team	Category	Player	Statistics
Sacred Heart	Passing		
Sacred Heart	Rushing		
Sacred Heart	Receiving		
Stonehill	Passing		
Stonehill	Rushing		
Stonehill	Receiving		

=== Wagner ===
Game Four – Wagner Seahawks (2–3) vs Stonehill Skyhawks (1–2) – Game summary

Quarter	1	2	3	4	Total
Seahawks	0	0	0	0	0
Skyhawks	0	0	0	0	0

at W.B. Mason Stadium • Easton, MA

- Date: Saturday October 5, 2024
- Game time: 1:00 p.m.
- TV: ESPN+/NESN 360

Game information

First quarter
Second quarter
Third quarter
Fourth quarter

Statistics	WAG	STO
First downs		
Total yards		
Rushing yards		
Passing yards		
Passing: Comp–Att–Int		
Time of possession		

Team	Category	Player	Statistics
Wagner	Passing		
Wagner	Rushing		
Wagner	Receiving		
Stonehill	Passing		
Stonehill	Rushing		
Stonehill	Receiving		

=== at LIU ===
Game Five – Stonehill Skyhawks (1–3) vs LIU Sharks (0–6) – Game summary

Quarter	1	2	3	4	Total
Skyhawks	0	0	0	0	0
Sharks	0	0	0	0	0

at Bethpage Federal Credit Union Stadium • Brookville, NY

- Date: Saturday October 12, 2024
- Game time: 12:00 PM
- TV: NEC Front Row

Game information

First quarter
Second quarter
Third quarter
Fourth quarter

Statistics	STO	LIU
First downs		
Total yards		
Rushing yards		
Passing yards		
Passing: Comp–Att–Int		
Time of possession		

Team	Category	Player	Statistics
Stonehill	Passing		
Stonehill	Rushing		
Stonehill	Receiving		
LIU	Passing		
LIU	Rushing		
LIU	Receiving		

=== at Merrimack ===
Game Six – Stonehill Skyhawks (1–4) vs Merrimack Warriors (2–4) – Game summary

Quarter	1	2	3	4	Total
Skyhawks	0	0	21	7	28
Warriors	17	10	7	14	48

at Duane Stadium • North Andover, MA

- Date: Saturday October 19, 2024
- Game time: 1:00 PM
- TV: NESN+/ESPN+

Game information

First quarter
Second quarter
Third quarter
Fourth quarter

Statistics	STO	MRMK
First downs	21	24
Total yards	321	479
Rushing yards	155	375
Passing yards	166	104
Passing: Comp–Att–Int	12–24–2	9–15–0
Time of possession	25:37	34:23

Team	Category	Player	Statistics
Stonehill	Passing	Jack O'Connell	12/24, 166 yards, 1 TD, 2 INT
Stonehill	Rushing	Jarel Washington	13 carries, 56 yards, 1 TD
Stonehill	Receiving	Cody Ruff	4 receptions, 56 yards, 1 TD
Merrimack	Passing	Ayden Pereira	8/14, 94 yards, 2 TD
Merrimack	Rushing	Jermaine Corbett	23 carries, 170 yards, 2 TD
Merrimack	Receiving	Jalen McDonald	1 receptions, 51 yards, 1 TD

=== Duquesne ===
Game Seven – Duquesne Dukes (4–2) at Stonehill Skyhawks (1–5) – Game summary

Quarter	1	2	3	4	Total
Dukes	0	0	0	0	0
Skyhawks	0	0	0	0	0

at W.B. Mason Stadium • Easton, MA

- Date: Saturday October 26, 2024
- Game time: 1:00 pm
- Game weather: 0 °F (−18 °C)
- TV announcers (NEC Front Row): TBD

Game information

First quarter
Second quarter
Third quarter
Fourth quarter

Statistics	DUQ	STO
First downs		
Total yards		
Rushing yards		
Passing yards		
Passing: Comp–Att–Int		
Time of possession		

Team	Category	Player	Statistics
Duquesne	Passing		
Duquesne	Rushing		
Duquesne	Receiving		
Stonehill	Passing		
Stonehill	Rushing		
Stonehill	Receiving		

=== at Saint Francis (PA) ===
Game Eight – Stonehill Skyhawks (1–6) at Saint Francis Red Flash (2–6) – Game summary

Quarter	1	2	3	4	Total
Skyhawks	0	0	0	0	0
Red Flash	0	0	0	0	0

at DeGol Field • Loretto, PA

- Date: Saturday November 2, 2024
- Game time: 12:00 pm
- Game weather: 0 °F (−18 °C)
- TV announcers (NEC Front Row): TBD

Game information

First quarter
Second quarter
Third quarter
Fourth quarter

Statistics	STO	SFPA
First downs		
Total yards		
Rushing yards		
Passing yards		
Passing: Comp–Att–Int		
Time of possession		

Team	Category	Player	Statistics
Stonehill	Passing		
Stonehill	Rushing		
Stonehill	Receiving		
Saint Francis (PA)	Passing		
Saint Francis (PA)	Rushing		
Saint Francis (PA)	Receiving		

=== Central Connecticut ===
Game Nine – Central Connecticut Blue Devils (4–5) at Stonehill Skyhawks (1–7) – Game summary

Quarter	1	2	3	4	Total
Blue Devils	7	7	0	7	21
Skyhawks	0	3	14	0	17

at W.B. Mason Stadium • Easton, MA

- Date: Saturday November 9, 2024
- Game time: 1:00 pm
- Game weather: Sunny, 50 °F (10 °C)
- Game attendance: 1,674
- Referee: Michael Quinn
- TV announcers (NEC Front Row): Charlie Bergeron (play-by-play)

Game information

First quarter

- (1:53) CCSU - Ricky Ortega 1 Yd Run (Jack Barnum Kick) (Drive: 18 plays, 75 yards, 10:17; Central Connecticut 7-0)

Second quarter

- (10:01) SHC - Danny Hurley 49 Yd Field Goal (Drive: 6 plays, 21 yards, 3:28; Central Connecticut 7-3)
- (1:58) CCSU - Elijah Howard 8 Yd Run (Jack Barnum Kick) (Drive: 15 plays, 73 yards, 8:06; Central Connecticut 14-3)

Third quarter

- (10:54) SHC - Jake Newsham 15 Yd pass from Jack O'Connell (Danny Hurley Kick) (Drive: 7 plays, 55 yards, 2:03; Central Connecticut 14-10)
- (2:54) SHC - Chase Miller 14 Yd pass from Jack O'Connell (Danny Hurley Kick) (Drive: 6 plays, 75 yards, 2:25; Stonehill 17-14)

Fourth quarter

- (8:54) CCSU - Donny Marcus 30 Yd pass from Brady Olson (Jack Barnum Kick) (Drive: 5 plays, 64 yards, 2:07; Central Connecticut 21-17)

Statistics	CCSU	STO
First downs	16	16
Total yards	285	256
Rushing yards	175	75
Passing yards	110	185
Passing: Comp–Att–Int	10–16–1	13–26–1
Time of possession	35:33	24:27

Team	Category	Player	Statistics
Central Connecticut	Passing	Brady Olson	10/16, 110 yards, TD, INT
Central Connecticut	Rushing	Elijah Howard	20 carries, 70 yards, TD
Central Connecticut	Receiving	Michael Plaskon	4 receptions, 41 yards
Stonehill	Passing	Jack O'Connell	11/20, 166 yards, 2 TD, INT
Stonehill	Rushing	Jarel Washington	10 carries, 33 yards
Stonehill	Receiving	Chase Miller	4 receptions, 70 yards, TD

=== at Lafayette ===
Game Ten – Stonehill Skyhawks (1–8) at Lafayette Leopards (5–5) – Game summary

Quarter	1	2	3	4	Total
Skyhawks	0	0	0	0	0
Leopards	0	0	0	0	0

at Fisher Stadium • Easton, PA

- Date: Saturday November 16, 2024
- Game time: 12:30 PM
- Game weather: 0 °F (−18 °C)
- TV: ESPN+

Game information

First quarter
Second quarter
Third quarter
Fourth quarter

Statistics	STO	LAF
First downs		
Total yards		
Rushing yards		
Passing yards		
Passing: Comp–Att–Int		
Time of possession		

Team	Category	Player	Statistics
Stonehill	Passing		
Stonehill	Rushing		
Stonehill	Receiving		
Lafayette	Passing		
Lafayette	Rushing		
Lafayette	Receiving		

=== at Robert Morris ===
Game Eleven – Stonehill Skyhawks (1–9) vs Robert Morris Colonials (6–5) – Game summary

Quarter	1	2	3	4	Total
Skyhawks	0	0	0	0	0
Colonials	0	0	0	0	0

at Joe Walton Stadium, Moon Township, PA

- Date: Saturday November 23, 2024
- Game time: 12:00 PM
- TV: NEC Front Row

Game information

First quarter
Second quarter
Third quarter
Fourth quarter

Statistics	STO	RMU
First downs		
Total yards		
Rushing yards		
Passing yards		
Passing: Comp–Att–Int		
Time of possession		

Team	Category	Player	Statistics
Stonehill	Passing		
Stonehill	Rushing		
Stonehill	Receiving		
Robert Morris	Passing		
Robert Morris	Rushing		
Robert Morris	Receiving		
