= 2024 Wagner Seahawks football team =

American college football season

2024 Wagner Seahawks football
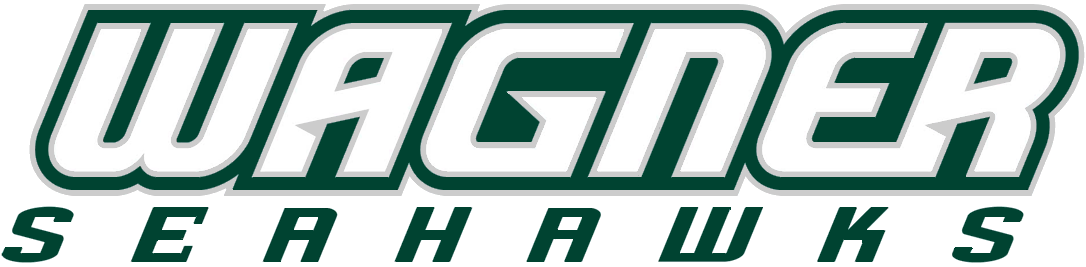
- Conference: Northeast Conference
- Record: 4–8 (2–4 NEC)
- Head coach: Tom Masella (5th season)
- Offensive coordinator: Stephen Matos (2nd season)
- Defensive coordinator: Derek Getchell (1st season)
- Home stadium: Wagner College Stadium

2024 Northeast Conference football standings
	Conf.			Overall
Team	W		L	W		L
Central Connecticut +^	5	–	1	7	–	6
Duquesne +	5	–	1	8	–	3
Robert Morris	4	–	2	7	–	5
LIU	3	–	3	4	–	8
Wagner	2	–	4	4	–	8
Saint Francis (PA)	2	–	4	4	–	7
Mercyhurst*	0	–	0	4	–	7
Stonehill*	0	–	6	1	–	10
+ – Conference co-champions; ^ – FCS playoff participant; * – Stonehill and Mercyhurst are ineligible for NEC title and FCS postseason play due to transition from NCAA Division II.; Rankings from STATS Poll

The 2024 Wagner Seahawks football team represented Wagner College as a member of the Northeast Conference (NEC) during the 2024 NCAA Division I FCS football season. The Seahawks were led by fifth-year head coach Tom Masella, and played their home games at Wagner College Stadium in Staten Island, New York.

== Schedule ==
Date	Time	Opponent	Site	TV	Result	Attendance
August 31	12:00 p.m.	Virginia–Lynchburg*	Wagner College Stadium; Staten Island, NY	NEC Front Row	W 46–7	2,258
September 7	12:00 p.m.	at Lehigh*	Goodman Stadium; Bethlehem, PA	ESPN+	L 13–49	2,920
September 14	3:00 p.m.	at Delaware State*	Alumni Stadium; Dover, DE	ESPN+	W 30–7	3,276
September 21	4:00 p.m.	Robert Morris^{†}	Wagner College Stadium; Staten Island, NY	NEC Front Row	L 14–21	2,954
September 28	6:00 p.m.	at Florida Atlantic*	FAU Stadium; Boca Raton, FL	ESPN+	L 10–41	21,151
October 5	1:00 p.m.	at Stonehill	W.B. Mason Stadium; Easton, MA	ESPN+, YES	W 28–7	1,643
October 12	12:00 p.m.	Columbia*	Wagner College Stadium; Staten Island, NY	NEC Front Row	L 6–24	2,637
October 19	12:00 p.m.	Saint Francis (PA)	Wagner College Stadium; Staten Island, NY	NEC Front Row	W 14–0	2,785
October 26	3:30 p.m.	at UMass*	McGuirk Alumni Stadium; Amherst, MA	ESPN+	L 7–35	14,374
November 2	12:00 p.m.	at Central Connecticut	Arute Field; New Britain, CT	NEC Front Row	L 14–24	4,152
November 16	12:00 p.m.	at No. 22 Duquesne	Rooney Field; Pittsburgh, PA	NEC Front Row	L 21–42	1,653
November 23	12:00 p.m.	LIU	Wagner College Stadium; Staten Island, NY	NEC Front Row	L 28–35	2,467
*Non-conference game; ^{†}Homecoming; Rankings from STATS Poll released prior to the game; All times are in Eastern time

== Game summaries ==
=== VUL (NCCAA) ===
Game One – VUL Dragons (NCCAA) (0–0) vs Wagner Seahawks (0–0) – Game summary

Quarter	1	2	3	4	Total
Dragons (NCCAA)	0	7	0	0	7
Seahawks	19	13	14	0	46

at Wagner College Stadium, Staten Island, New York

- Date: Saturday August 31, 2024
- Game time: 12:00 PM
- Game weather: Cloudy • Temperature: 73 °F (23 °C) • Wind: SE at 7 miles per hour (11 km/h)
- Game attendance: 2,258
- Referee: Michael Davis
- TV: NEC Front Row

Game information

First quarter

- (13:44) WAG – Rickey Spruill 6-yard run, Ryan Liszner kick (Drive: 2 plays, 48 yards, 1:10, Wagner 7-0)
- (6:30) WAG – Jaylen Bonelli 20-yard pass from Damien Mazil, Ryan Liszner kick (Drive: 6 plays, 56 yards, 2:25, Wagner 14-0)
- (6:21) WAG – 0-yard safety, Ryan Liszner kick (Wagner 16-0)
- (4:18) WAG – Ryan Liszner 31-yard field goal (Drive: 6 plays, 44 yards, 1:56, Wagner 19-0)

Second quarter

- (13:22) VUL – Micah Gantt 13-yard pass from Matthew Jenks, Ryan Pettit kick (Drive: 12 plays, 92 yards, 4:49, Wagner 19-7)
- (10:19) WAG – Jaylen Bonelli 28-yard pass from Jake Cady (Drive: 8 plays, 83 yards, 2:57, Wagner 25-7)
- (7:24) WAG – Sekou Kamau 4-yard pass from Jake Cady, Ryan Liszner kick (Drive: 2 plays, 41 yards, 1:06, Wagner 32-7)

Third quarter

- (11:11) WAG – Teree McDonald 32-yard pass from Jake Cady, Ryan Liszner kick (Drive: 4 plays, 45 yards, 1:36, Wagner 39-7)
- (5:13) WAG – Julio Tatis 2-yard run, Drew Borner kick (Drive: 6 plays, 32 yards, 3:49, Wagner 46-7)

Fourth quarter

No scoring plays

Statistics	VUL	WAG
First downs	13	19
Total yards	142	431
Rushing yards	-26	179
Passing yards	168	252
Passing: Comp–Att–Int	23–34–1	11–20–0
Time of possession	21:09	32:43

Team	Category	Player	Statistics
VUL	Passing	Matthew Jenks	16/24, 155 yards, TD, INT
VUL	Rushing	Jacob Newman	9 carries, 4 yards
VUL	Receiving	Ryan Sims	9 receptions, 102 yards
Wagner	Passing	Damien Mazil	5/9, 135 yards, TD
Wagner	Rushing	Sekou Kamau	7 carries, 72 yards
Wagner	Receiving	Jaylen Bonelli	4 receptions, 106 yards, 2 TD

=== at Lehigh ===
Game Two – Wagner Seahawks (1–0) at Lehigh Mountain Hawks (0–1) – Game summary

Quarter	1	2	3	4	Total
Seahawks	0	0	6	7	13
Mountain Hawks	21	21	7	0	49

at Goodman Stadium • Lower Saucon Township, Pennsylvania

- Date: Saturday September 7, 2024
- Game time: 12:00 p.m. EST
- Game weather: Sunny
- Game attendance: 2,920
- Referee: Henry Wimberg
- TV announcers (ESPN+): TBD

Game information

First quarter

- (8:59) LEH – Geoffrey Jamiel 16-yard pass from Dante Perri, Nick Garrido kick (Drive: 3 plays, 17 yards, 1:28, Lehigh 7-0)
- (8:22) LEH – Jaden Green 6-yard run, Nick Garrido kick (Drive: 1 play, 6 yards, 0:05, Lehigh 14-0)
- (3:52) LEH – Luke Yoder 11-yard run, Nick Garrido kick (Drive: 6 plays, 36 yards, 2:53, Lehigh 21-0)

Second quarter

- (7:25) LEH – Hayden Johnson 45-yard run, Nick Garrido kick (Drive: 6 plays, 80 yards, 3:21, Lehigh 28-0)
- (1:03) LEH – Dante Perri 2-yard run, Nick Garrido kick (Drive: 6 plays, 24 yards, 3:30, Lehigh 35-0)
- (0:48) LEH – Nick Peltekian 27-yard interception return, Canaan Kimball kick (Drive: 1 play, 76 yards, 0:08, Lehigh 42-0)

Third quarter

- (13:22) LEH – Mason Humphrey 37-yard pass from Dante Perri, Nick Garrido kick (Drive: 3 plays, 44 yards, 1:28, Lehigh 49-0)
- (7:09) WAG – Rickey Spruill 11-yard pass from Damien Mazil, Ryan Liszner PAT failed (Drive: 12 plays, 62 yards, 6:06, Lehigh 49-6)

Fourth quarter

- (2:58) WAG – Jaylen Bonelli 14-yard pass from Damien Mazil, Ryan Liszner kick (Drive: 12 plays, 77 yards, 6:44, Lehigh 49-13)

Statistics	WAG	LEH
First downs	18	15
Total yards	249	274
Rushing yards	95	190
Passing yards	154	84
Passing: Comp–Att–Int	18–32–3	6–8–0
Time of possession	31:00	29:00

Team	Category	Player	Statistics
Wagner	Passing	Damien Mazil	18/31, 154 yards, 2 TD, 3 INT
Wagner	Rushing	Sekou Kamau	14 carries, 55 yards
Wagner	Receiving	Jaylen Bonelli	5 receptions, 54 yards, TD
Lehigh	Passing	Dante Perri	6/8, 84 yards, 2 TD
Lehigh	Rushing	Luke Yoder	9 carries, 64 yards, TD
Lehigh	Receiving	Mason Humphrey	2 receptions, 43 yards, TD

=== at Delaware State ===
Game Three – Wagner Seahawks (1–1) vs Delaware State Hornets (1–1) – Game summary

Quarter	1	2	3	4	Total
Seahawks	10	0	13	7	30
Hornets	7	0	0	0	7

at Alumni Stadium, Dover, Delaware

- Date: Saturday September 14, 2024
- Game time: 3:00 PM
- Game weather: Sunny • Temperature: 80 °F (27 °C) • Wind: E at 12 miles per hour (19 km/h)
- Game attendance: 3,276
- Referee: Derek Hatten
- TV: ESPN+

Game information

First quarter

- (14:40) WAG – Rickey Spruill 60-yard run, Drew Borner kick (Drive: 1 play, 60 yards, 0:20; Wagner 7–0)
- (7:54) WAG – Drew Borner 30-yard field goal (Drive: 11 plays, 40 yards, 4:39; Wagner 10–0)
- (4:09) DSU – Marqui Adams 19-yard run, Nathan Wilson kick (Drive: 6 plays, 78 yards, 3:40; Wagner 10–7)

Second quarter

No scoring plays

Third quarter

- (7:50) WAG – Jaylen Bonelli 38-yard pass from Jake Cady (Drive: 10 plays, 82 yards, 5:45; Wagner 16–7)
- (1:49) WAG – Teree McDonald 7-yard pass from Jake Cady, Drew Borner kick (Drive: 3 plays, 21 yards, 1:08; Wagner 23–7)

Fourth quarter

- (8:10) WAG – Jake Cady 3-yard run, Drew Borner kick (Drive: 2 plays, 19 yards, 0:25; Wagner 30–7)

Statistics	WAG	DSU
First downs	19	18
Total yards	58–377	60–323
Rushing yards	32–175	25–174
Passing yards	202	149
Passing: Comp–Att–Int	18–26–1	16–35–2
Time of possession	29:09	30:51

Team	Category	Player	Statistics
Wagner	Passing	Jake Cady	18/26, 202 yards, TD, INT
Wagner	Rushing	Rickey Spruill	15 carries, 143 yards
Wagner	Receiving	Jaylen Bonelli	7 receptions, 117 yards
Delaware State	Passing	Marqui Adams	16/32, 149 yards, 2 INT
Delaware State	Rushing	Jaden Sutton	8 carries, 92 yards
Delaware State	Receiving	NyGhee Lolley	3 receptions, 49 yards

=== Robert Morris ===
Game Four – Robert Morris Colonials (1–2) vs Wagner Seahawks (2–1) – Game summary

Quarter	1	2	3	4	Total
Colonials	7	0	14	0	21
Seahawks	7	0	0	7	14

at Wagner College Stadium, Staten Island, New York

- Date: Saturday September 21, 2024
- Game time: 4:00 PM
- Game weather: Sunny • Temperature: 78 °F (26 °C) • Wind: NE at 6 miles per hour (9.7 km/h)
- Game attendance: 2,954
- Referee: Mike Bilica
- TV: NEC Front Row

Game information

First quarter

- (8:01) WAG – Mark Didio Jr. 22-yard pass from Jake Cady, Matthew Schwindt kick (Drive: 7 plays, 75 yards, 3:19; Wagner 7–0)
- (5:36) RMU – Tyvon Edmonds Jr. 2-yard run, Jayson Jenkins kick (Drive: 5 plays, 75 yards, 2:25; Tied 7–7)

Second quarter

No scoring plays

Third quarter

- (12:08) RMU – Tyvon Edmonds Jr. 1-yard run, Jayson Jenkins kick (Drive: 7 plays, 84 yards, 2:47; Robert Morris 14–7)
- (10:14) RMU – Anthony Chiccitt 3-yard run, Jayson Jenkins kick (Drive: 2 plays, 14 yards, 0:48; Robert Morris 21–7)

Fourth quarter

- (4:16) WAG – Teree McDonald 20-yard pass from Jake Cady, Matthew Schwindt kick (Drive: 8 plays, 80 yards, 2:52; Robert Morris 21–14)

Statistics	RMU	WAG
First downs	19	10
Total yards	358	289
Rushing yards	139	169
Passing yards	219	120
Passing: Comp–Att–Int	17–27–1	13–26–0
Time of possession	32:41	27:19

Team	Category	Player	Statistics
Robert Morris	Passing	Anthony Chiccitt	17/26, 219 yards
Robert Morris	Rushing	Tyvon Edmonds Jr.	16 carries, 99 yards, 2 TD
Robert Morris	Receiving	Noah Robinson	4 receptions, 90 yards
Wagner	Passing	Jake Cady	13/26, 120 yards, 2 TD
Wagner	Rushing	Rickey Spruill	11 carries, 72 yards
Wagner	Receiving	Mark Didio Jr.	4 receptions, 44 yards, TD

=== at Florida Atlantic (FBS) ===
Game Five – Wagner Seahawks (2–2) vs Florida Atlantic Owls (FBS) (1–3) – Game summary

Quarter	1	2	3	4	Total
Seahawks	0	10	0	0	10
Owls (FBS)	10	7	10	14	41

at FAU Stadium • Boca Raton, Florida

- Date: Saturday September 28, 2024
- Game time: 6:00 p.m. EDT
- Game weather: Cloudy • Temperature: 90 °F (32 °C) • Wind: S at 12 miles per hour (19 km/h)
- Game attendance: 21,151
- Referee: Reid Jackson
- TV announcers (ESPN+): Ryan Urquhart (play-by-play), Patrick Murray (analyst) and Natalie Kalibat (sideline)

Game information

First quarter

- (14:28) FAU – CJ Campbell Jr. 4-yard run, Morgan Suarez kick (Drive: 2 plays, 75 yards, 0:32; Florida Atlantic 7–0)
- (8:54) FAU – Carter Davis 51-yard field goal (Drive: 9 plays, 49 yards, 3:40; Florida Atlantic 10–0)

Second quarter

- (11:52) FAU – Zuberi Mobley 22-yard run, Morgan Suarez kick (Drive: 10 plays, 77 yards, 5:23; Florida Atlantic 17–0)
- (8:22) WAG – Chase Stafford 6-yard pass from Jake Cady, Ryan Liszner kick (Drive: 10 plays, 81 yards, 3:24; Florida Atlantic 17–7)
- (2:07) WAG – Matthew Schwindt 25-yard field goal (Drive: 10 plays, 52 yards, 4:07; Florida Atlantic 17–10)

Third quarter

- (6:18) FAU – Morgan Suarez 29-yard field goal (Drive: 11 plays, 81 yards, 5:04; Florida Atlantic 20–10)
- (1:52) FAU – CJ Campbell Jr. 11-yard run, Morgan Suarez kick (Drive: 7 plays, 68 yards, 3:16; Florida Atlantic 27–10)

Fourth quarter

- (12:53) FAU – Kasen Weisman 4-yard run, Morgan Suarez kick (Drive: 5 plays, 34 yards, 1:54; Florida Atlantic 34–10)
- (5:47) FAU – Gemari Sands 1-yard run, Morgan Suarez kick (Drive: 9 plays, 68 yards, 5:02; Florida Atlantic 41–10)

Statistics	WAG	FAU
First downs	13	29
Total yards	132	572
Rushing yards	20	215
Passing yards	112	257
Passing: Comp–Att–Int	11–32–0	17–25–2
Time of possession	26:15	33:45

Team	Category	Player	Statistics
Wagner	Passing	Jake Cady	11/30, 112 yards, TD
Wagner	Rushing	Rickey Spruill	8 carries, 15 yards
Wagner	Receiving	Teree McDonald	3 receptions, 43 yards
Florida Atlantic	Passing	Cam Fancher	9/12, 150 yards, INT
Florida Atlantic	Rushing	CJ Campbell Jr.	14 carries, 129 yards, 2 TD
Florida Atlantic	Receiving	Omari Hayes	6 receptions, 137 yards

=== at Stonehill ===
Game Six – Wagner Seahawks (2–3) vs Stonehill Skyhawks (1–2) – Game summary

Quarter	1	2	3	4	Total
Seahawks	0	0	0	0	0
Skyhawks	0	0	0	0	0

at W.B. Mason Stadium • Easton, Massachusetts

- Date: Saturday October 5, 2024
- Game time: 1:00 p.m.
- TV: ESPN+/YES

Game information

First quarter
Second quarter
Third quarter
Fourth quarter

Statistics	WAG	STO
First downs		
Total yards		
Rushing yards		
Passing yards		
Passing: Comp–Att–Int		
Time of possession		

Team	Category	Player	Statistics
Wagner	Passing		
Wagner	Rushing		
Wagner	Receiving		
Stonehill	Passing		
Stonehill	Rushing		
Stonehill	Receiving		

=== Columbia ===
Game Seven – Columbia Lions (2–1) vs Wagner Seahawks (3–3) – Game summary

Quarter	1	2	3	4	Total
Lions	0	0	0	0	0
Seahawks	0	0	0	0	0

at Wagner College Stadium, Staten Island, New York

- Date: Saturday October 12, 2024
- Game time: 12:00 PM
- TV: NEC Front Row

Game information

First quarter
Second quarter
Third quarter
Fourth quarter

Statistics	COLU	WAG
First downs		
Total yards		
Rushing yards		
Passing yards		
Passing: Comp–Att–Int		
Time of possession		

Team	Category	Player	Statistics
Columbia	Passing		
Columbia	Rushing		
Columbia	Receiving		
Wagner	Passing		
Wagner	Rushing		
Wagner	Receiving		

=== Saint Francis (PA) ===
Game Eight – Saint Francis Red Flash (2–4) vs Wagner Seahawks (3–4) – Game summary

Quarter	1	2	3	4	Total
Red Flash	0	0	0	0	0
Seahawks	0	0	0	0	0

at Wagner College Stadium, Staten Island, New York

- Date: Saturday October 19, 2024
- Game time: 12:00 PM
- TV: NEC Front Row

Game information

First quarter
Second quarter
Third quarter
Fourth quarter

Statistics	SFPA	WAG
First downs		
Total yards		
Rushing yards		
Passing yards		
Passing: Comp–Att–Int		
Time of possession		

Team	Category	Player	Statistics
Saint Francis (PA)	Passing		
Saint Francis (PA)	Rushing		
Saint Francis (PA)	Receiving		
Wagner	Passing		
Wagner	Rushing		
Wagner	Receiving		

=== at UMass (FBS) ===
Game Nine – Wagner Seahawks (4–4) vs UMass Minutemen (FBS) (1–6) – Game summary

Quarter	1	2	3	4	Total
Seahawks	0	0	0	0	0
Minutemen (FBS)	0	0	0	0	0

at McGuirk Alumni Stadium • Amherst, Massachusetts

- Date: Saturday October 26, 2024
- Game time: 3:30 p.m.
- TV announcers (ESPN+): Jay Burnham (play-by-play) and Andy Gresh (analyst)

Game information

First quarter
Second quarter
Third quarter
Fourth quarter

Statistics	WAG	MASS
First downs		
Total yards		
Rushing yards		
Passing yards		
Passing: Comp–Att–Int		
Time of possession		

Team	Category	Player	Statistics
Wagner	Passing		
Wagner	Rushing		
Wagner	Receiving		
UMass	Passing		
UMass	Rushing		
UMass	Receiving		

=== at Central Connecticut ===
Game Ten – Wagner Seahawks (4–5) vs Central Connecticut Blue Devils (3–5) – Game summary

Quarter	1	2	3	4	Total
Seahawks	7	0	0	7	14
Blue Devils	7	10	0	7	24

at Arute Field • New Britain, Connecticut

- Date: Saturday November 2, 2024
- Game time: 12:00 p.m.
- Game weather: Sunny
- Game attendance: 4,152
- Referee: Michael Bilica
- TV announcers (NEC Front Row): Bruce Biel (play-by-play) and Marc Robbins (analyst)

Game information

First quarter

- (12:25) WAG - Rickey Spruill 81 Yd pass from Jake Cady (Matthew Schwindt Kick) (Drive: 1 play, 81 yards, 0:14; Wagner 7-0)
- (2:57) CCSU - Brady Olson 10 Yd Run (Jack Barnum Kick) (Drive: 10 plays, 63 yards, 4:56; Tied 7-7)

Second quarter

- (9:17) CCSU - Jack Barnum 30 Yd Field Goal (Drive: 12 plays, 56 yards, 6:22; Central Connecticut 10-7)
- (0:55) CCSU - Elijah Howard 8 Yd Run (Jack Barnum Kick) (Drive: 5 plays, 54 yards, 1:18; Central Connecticut 17-7)

Third quarter

No scoring plays

Fourth quarter

- (12:10) WAG - Rickey Spruill 13 Yd Run (Matthew Schwindt Kick) (Drive: 10 plays, 78 yards, 2:50; Central Connecticut 17-14)
- (5:23) CCSU - Joe Crifasi 17 Yd pass from Brady Olson (Jack Barnum Kick) (Drive: 10 plays, 75 yards, 6:47; Central Connecticut 24-14)

Statistics	WAG	CCSU
First downs	15	19
Total yards	219	316
Rushing yards	24	134
Passing yards	195	182
Passing: Comp–Att–Int	13–27–0	16–27–0
Time of possession	26:50	33:10

Team	Category	Player	Statistics
Wagner	Passing	Jake Cady	13/27, 195 yards, TD
Wagner	Rushing	Rickey Spruill	8 carries, 15 yards, TD
Wagner	Receiving	Rickey Spruill	1 reception, 81 yards, TD
Central Connecticut	Passing	Brady Olson	16/27, 182 yards, TD
Central Connecticut	Rushing	Elijah Howard	21 carries, 75 yards, TD
Central Connecticut	Receiving	Paul Marsh Jr.	3 receptions, 49 yards

=== at No. 22 Duquesne ===
Game Eleven – Wagner Seahawks (4–6) vs No. 22 Duquesne Dukes (7–2) – Game summary

Quarter	1	2	3	4	Total
Seahawks	0	0	0	0	0
No. 22 Dukes	0	0	0	0	0

at Rooney Field • Pittsburgh, Pennsylvania

- Date: Saturday November 16, 2024
- Game time: 12:00 p.m.
- TV: NEC Front Row

Game information

First quarter
Second quarter
Third quarter
Fourth quarter

Statistics	WAG	DUQ
First downs		
Total yards		
Rushing yards		
Passing yards		
Passing: Comp–Att–Int		
Time of possession		

Team	Category	Player	Statistics
Wagner	Passing		
Wagner	Rushing		
Wagner	Receiving		
Duquesne	Passing		
Duquesne	Rushing		
Duquesne	Receiving		

=== LIU ===
Game Twelve – LIU Sharks (0–0) vs Wagner Seahawks (0–0) – Game summary

Quarter	1	2	3	4	Total
Sharks	0	0	0	0	0
Seahawks	0	0	0	0	0

at Wagner College Stadium, Staten Island, New York

- Date: Saturday November 23, 2024
- Game time: 12:00 PM
- TV: NEC Front Row

Game information

First quarter
Second quarter
Third quarter
Fourth quarter

Statistics	LIU	WAG
First downs		
Total yards		
Rushing yards		
Passing yards		
Passing: Comp–Att–Int		
Time of possession		

Team	Category	Player	Statistics
LIU	Passing		
LIU	Rushing		
LIU	Receiving		
Wagner	Passing		
Wagner	Rushing		
Wagner	Receiving		
