= 2024 Robert Morris Colonials football team =

American college football season

2024 Robert Morris Colonials football
- Conference: Northeast Conference
- Record: 7–5 (4–2 NEC)
- Head coach: Bernard Clark (7th season)
- Offensive coordinator: Josh Firm (2nd season)
- Defensive coordinator: Dave Plungas (7th season)
- Home stadium: Joe Walton Stadium

2024 Northeast Conference football standings
	Conf.			Overall
Team	W		L	W		L
Central Connecticut +^	5	–	1	7	–	6
Duquesne +	5	–	1	8	–	3
Robert Morris	4	–	2	7	–	5
LIU	3	–	3	4	–	8
Wagner	2	–	4	4	–	8
Saint Francis (PA)	2	–	4	4	–	7
Mercyhurst*	0	–	0	4	–	7
Stonehill*	0	–	6	1	–	10
+ – Conference co-champions; ^ – FCS playoff participant; * – Stonehill and Mercyhurst are ineligible for NEC title and FCS postseason play due to transition from NCAA Division II.; Rankings from STATS Poll

The 2024 Robert Morris Colonials football team represented the Robert Morris University as a member of the Northeast Conference (NEC) during the 2024 NCAA Division I FCS football season. Led by seventh-year head coach Bernard Clark, the Colonials played home games at the Joe Walton Stadium in Moon Township, Pennsylvania.

== Schedule ==
Date	Time	Opponent	Site	TV	Result	Attendance
August 31	8:00 p.m.	at Utah State*	Maverik Stadium; Logan, UT	Mountain West Network	L 14–36	17,037
September 7	6:00 p.m.	Edinboro*	Joe Walton Stadium; Moon Township, PA	NEC Front Row	L 21–23	3,581
September 14	12:00 p.m.	Mercyhurst	Joe Walton Stadium; Moon Township, PA	ESPN+	W 55–28	2,393
September 21	4:00 p.m.	at Wagner	Wagner College Stadium; Staten Island, NY	NEC Front Row	W 21–14	2,954
September 28	2:00 p.m.	at Eastern Kentucky*	Roy Kidd Stadium; Richmond, KY	ESPN+	L 7–31	2,868
October 12	3:00 p.m.	Delaware State*^{†}	Joe Walton Stadium; Moon Township, PA	NEC Front Row	W 23–0	2,234
October 19	12:00 p.m.	LIU	Joe Walton Stadium; Moon Township, PA	NEC Front Row	W 45–31	1,855
October 26	2:00 p.m.	Saint Francis (PA)	Joe Walton Stadium; Moon Township, PA	NEC Front Row	W 17–0	2,657
November 2	12:00 p.m.	Merrimack*	Joe Walton Stadium; Moon Township, PA	NEC Front Row	W 6–0	1,091
November 9	12:00 p.m.	at No. 25 Duquesne	Rooney Field; Pittsburgh, PA	NEC Front Row	L 6–31	2,018
November 16	12:00 p.m.	at Central Connecticut	Arute Field; New Britain, CT	NEC Front Row	L 33–35 ^{2OT}	3,192
November 23	12:00 p.m.	Stonehill	Joe Walton Stadium; Moon Township, PA	NEC Front Row	W 31–13	862
*Non-conference game; ^{†}Homecoming; Rankings from STATS Poll released prior to the game; All times are in Eastern time

== Game summaries ==
=== at Utah State (FBS) ===
Game One – Robert Morris Colonials (0–0) vs Utah State Aggies (FBS) (0–0) – Game summary

Quarter	1	2	3	4	Total
Colonials	0	14	0	0	14
Aggies (FBS)	7	3	10	16	36

at Maverik Stadium • Logan, UT

- Date: August 31, 2024
- Game time: 8:00 PM EST
- Game weather: Sunny, 88 °F (31 °C)
- Game attendance: 17,037
- Referee: Michael Cuttone
- TV announcers (KMYU/Mountain West Network): Dave Fox (play-by-play), Alema Harrington (analyst) and Frank Dolce (reporter)

Game information

First quarter

- (2:00) USU – Kyrese White 57-yard pass from Spencer Petras, Elliott Nimrod kick (Drive: 3 plays, 63 yards, 1:09; Utah State 7–0)

Second quarter

- (13:33) RMU – Cole Mitchell 40-yard pass from Anthony Chiccitt, Jayson Jenkins kick (Drive: 7 plays, 75 yards, 3:27; Tied 7–7)
- (9:30) USU – Elliott Nimrod 36-yard field goal (Drive: 9 plays, 56 yards, 4:03; Utah State 10–7)
- (0:41) RMU – Delvecchio Powell II 31-yard run, Jayson Jenkins kick (Drive: 7 plays, 80 yards, 2:04; Robert Morris 14–10)

Third quarter

- (10:33) USU – Kyrese White 53-yard pass from Bryson Barnes, Elliott Nimrod kick (Drive: 7 plays, 85 yards, 2:45; Utah State 17–14)
- (2:38) USU – Elliott Nimrod 50-yard field goal (Drive: 6 plays, 52 yards, 1:47; Utah State 20–14)

Fourth quarter

- (13:31) USU – Bryson Barnes 63-yard run (Drive: 2 plays, 71 yards, 0:37; Utah State 26–14)
- (10:57) USU – Jalen Royals 21-yard pass from Bryson Barnes, Elliott Nimrod kick (Drive: 2 plays, 76 yards, 0:26; Utah State 33–14)
- (1:49) USU – Elliott Nimrod 42-yard field goal (Drive: 9 plays, 67 yards, 5:21; Utah State 36–14)

Statistics	RMU	USU
First downs	18	23
Total yards	362	646
Rushing yards	137	303
Passing yards	225	343
Passing: Comp–Att–Int	29-40-1	21-36-3
Time of possession	34:22	25:38

Team	Category	Player	Statistics
Robert Morris	Passing	Anthony Chiccitt	22/30, 171 yards, TD, INT
Robert Morris	Rushing	Tyvon Edmonds Jr.	19 carries, 86 yards
Robert Morris	Receiving	Cole Mitchell	4 receptions, 60 yards, TD
Utah State	Passing	Bryson Barnes	11/21, 198 yards, 2 TD, INT
Utah State	Rushing	Robert Briggs Jr.	9 carries, 88 yards
Utah State	Receiving	Kyrese White	3 receptions, 131 yards, 2 TD

=== vs. Edinboro (DII) ===
Game Two – Edinboro Fighting Scots (DII) (0–1) vs Robert Morris Colonials (0–1) – Game summary

Quarter	1	2	3	4	Total
Fighting Scots (DII)	7	7	7	2	23
Colonials	0	14	0	7	21

at Joe Walton Stadium • Moon Township, PA

- Date: Saturday September 7, 2024
- Game time: 6:00 PM EST
- Game weather: Sunny • Temperature: 64 °F (18 °C) • Wind: NW at 11 miles per hour (18 km/h)
- Game attendance: 3,581
- Referee: Michael Quinn
- TV announcers (NEC Front Row): TBD

Game information

First quarter

- (5:34) EDI – Teagan Brown 5-yard pass from Isaac Bernard, Brandon Lambert kick (Drive: 15 plays, 76 yards, 9:21; Edinboro 7–0)

Second quarter

- (4:41) EDI – Bo Swartz 2-yard run, Brandon Lambert kick (Drive: 9 plays, 55 yards, 5:06; Edinboro 14–0)
- (1:47) RMU – Chaz Middleton 8-yard pass from Anthony Chiccitt, Jayson Jenkins kick (Drive: 8 plays, 54 yards, 2:45; Edinboro 14–7)
- (1:31) RMU – Tyvon Edmonds Jr. 15-yard run, Jayson Jenkins kick (Drive: 1 play, 15 yards, 0:07; Tied 14–14)

Third quarter

- (1:18) EDI – Clayton Bezon 5-yard pass from Isaac Bernard, Brandon Lambert kick (Drive: 2 plays, 5 yards, 0:41; Edinboro 21–14)

Fourth quarter

- (13:04) RMU – DJ Moyer 12-yard run, Jayson Jenkins kick (Drive: 9 plays, 66 yards, 3:10; Tied 21–21)
- (11:08) EDI – 0-yard safety (Edinboro 23–21)

Statistics	EDI	RMU
First downs	18	12
Total yards	258	224
Rushing yards	97	113
Passing yards	161	111
Passing: Comp–Att–Int	20–27–1	14–21–1
Time of possession	38:09	21:51

Team	Category	Player	Statistics
Edinboro	Passing	Isaac Bernard	20/27, 161 yards, 2 TD, INT
Edinboro	Rushing	Caron Robinson	16 carries, 91 yards
Edinboro	Receiving	Teagan Brown	8 receptions, 80 yards, TD
Robert Morris	Passing	Anthony Chiccitt	14/21, 111 yards, TD, INT
Robert Morris	Rushing	Tyvon Edmonds Jr.	14 carries, 67 yards, TD
Robert Morris	Receiving	Noah Robinson	4 receptions, 73 yards

=== vs. Mercyhurst ===
Game Three – Mercyhurst Lakers (1–1) vs Robert Morris Colonials (0–2) – Game summary

Quarter	1	2	3	4	Total
Lakers	0	14	7	7	28
Colonials	14	20	7	14	55

at Joe Walton Stadium • Moon Township, PA

- Date: Saturday September 14, 2024
- Game time: 12:00 PM EST
- Game weather: Sunny, 86 °F (30 °C)
- Game attendance: 2,393
- Referee: Michael Davis
- TV announcers (ESPN+): TBD

Game information

First quarter

- (10:44) RMU – Noah Robinson 14-yard pass from Anthony Chiccitt, Jayson Jenkins kick (Drive: 9 plays, 75 yards, 4:11; Robert Morris 7–0)
- (9:06) RMU – DJ Moyer 3-yard run, Jayson Jenkins kick (Drive: 2 plays, 28 yards, 0:55; Robert Morris 14–0)

Second quarter

- (10:02) RMU – Chaz Middleton 5-yard pass from Anthony Chiccitt, Jayson Jenkins kick (Drive: 6 plays, 42 yards, 2:56; Robert Morris 21–0)
- (4:57) MER – Cameron Barmore 5-yard pass from Adam Urena (Drive: 12 plays, 72 yards, 4:59; Robert Morris 21–6)
- (3:21) MER – Ayron Rodriguez 1-yard run, Ayron Rodriguez pass (Drive: 1 play, 1 yard, 0:04; Robert Morris 21–14)
- (3:04) RMU – Noah Robinson 63-yard pass from Anthony Chicitt (Drive: 1 play, 63 yards, 0:11; Robert Morris 27–14)
- (0:45) RMU – Trenell Ridgley 17-yard pass from Anthony Chicitt, Jayson Jenkins kick (Drive: 5 plays, 59 yards, 1:02; Robert Morris 34–14)

Third quarter

- (9:54) MER – Earnest Davis 1-yard run, Nathan Nagucki kick (Drive: 9 plays, 75 yards, 5:06; Robert Morris 34–21)
- (1:26) RMU – Ethan Shine 2-yard pass from Anthony Chiccitt, Jayson Jenkins kick (Drive: 15 plays, 85 yards, 8:13; Robert Morris 41–21)

Fourth quarter

- (11:18) RMU – Tyvon Edmonds Jr., 4-yard run, Jayson Jenkins kick (Drive: 7 plays, 80 yards, 3:35; Robert Morris 48–21)
- (6:11) RMU – Trevor Wilson 14-yard pass from Zach Tanner, Jayson Jenkins kick (Drive: 6 plays, 52 yards, 3:15; Robert Morris 55–21)
- (1:56) MER – Cameron Barmore 1-yard pass from Adam Urena, Nathan Nagucki kick (Drive: 12 plays, 72 yards, 4:08; Robert Morris 55–28)

Statistics	MERC	RMU
First downs	17	26
Total yards	297	536
Rushing yards	93	171
Passing yards	204	365
Passing: Comp–Att–Int	27–41–1	23–29–1
Time of possession	29:04	30:56

Team	Category	Player	Statistics
Mercyhurst	Passing	Adam Urena	27/41, 204 yards, 2 TD, INT
Mercyhurst	Rushing	Earnest Davis	11 carries, 81 yards, TD
Mercyhurst	Receiving	Cameron Barmore	9 receptions, 98 yards, 2 TD
Robert Morris	Passing	Anthony Chiccitt	19/25, 307 yards, 5 TD, INT
Robert Morris	Rushing	Tyvon Edmonds Jr.	19 carries, 133 yards, TD
Robert Morris	Receiving	Noah Robinson	4 receptions, 116 yards, 2 TD

=== at Wagner ===
Game Four – Robert Morris Colonials (1–2) vs Wagner Seahawks (2–1) – Game summary

Quarter	1	2	3	4	Total
Colonials	7	0	14	0	21
Seahawks	7	0	0	7	14

at Wagner College Stadium, Staten Island, New York

- Date: Saturday September 21, 2024
- Game time: 4:00 PM
- Game weather: Sunny • Temperature: 78 °F (26 °C) • Wind: NE at 6 miles per hour (9.7 km/h)
- Game attendance: 2,954
- Referee: Mike Bilica
- TV: NEC Front Row

Game information

First quarter

- (8:01) WAG – Mark Didio Jr. 22-yard pass from Jake Cady, Matthew Schwindt kick (Drive: 7 plays, 75 yards, 3:19; Wagner 7–0)
- (5:36) RMU – Tyvon Edmonds Jr. 2-yard run, Jayson Jenkins kick (Drive: 5 plays, 75 yards, 2:25; Tied 7–7)

Second quarter

No scoring plays

Third quarter

- (12:08) RMU – Tyvon Edmonds Jr. 1-yard run, Jayson Jenkins kick (Drive: 7 plays, 84 yards, 2:47; Robert Morris 14–7)
- (10:14) RMU – Anthony Chiccitt 3-yard run, Jayson Jenkins kick (Drive: 2 plays, 14 yards, 0:48; Robert Morris 21–7)

Fourth quarter

- (4:16) WAG – Teree McDonald 20-yard pass from Jake Cady, Matthew Schwindt kick (Drive: 8 plays, 80 yards, 2:52; Robert Morris 21–14)

Statistics	RMU	WAG
First downs	19	10
Total yards	358	289
Rushing yards	139	169
Passing yards	219	120
Passing: Comp–Att–Int	17–27–1	13–26–0
Time of possession	32:41	27:19

Team	Category	Player	Statistics
Robert Morris	Passing	Anthony Chiccitt	17/26, 219 yards
Robert Morris	Rushing	Tyvon Edmonds Jr.	16 carries, 99 yards, 2 TD
Robert Morris	Receiving	Noah Robinson	4 receptions, 90 yards
Wagner	Passing	Jake Cady	13/26, 120 yards, 2 TD
Wagner	Rushing	Rickey Spruill	11 carries, 72 yards
Wagner	Receiving	Mark Didio Jr.	4 receptions, 44 yards, TD

=== at Eastern Kentucky ===
Game Five – Robert Morris Colonials (2–2) vs Eastern Kentucky Colonels (2–2) – Game summary

Quarter	1	2	3	4	Total
Colonials	0	7	0	0	7
Colonels	7	3	14	7	31

at Roy Kidd Stadium • Richmond, KY

- Date: Saturday September 28, 2024
- Game time: 2:00 p.m.
- Game weather: Rain • Temperature: 68 °F (20 °C)
- Game attendance: 2,868
- Referee: Michael Lennie
- TV announcers (ESPN+): TBD
- Box Score

Game information
First quarter
- EKU – Joshua Carter 6-yard run (Patrick Nations kick), 12:11. Eastern Kentucky 7–0. Drive: 8 plays, 75 yards, 2:44.

Second quarter

- RMU – Noah Robinson 19-yard pass from Shawn Charles (Jayson Jenkins kick), 9:59. Tied 7–7. Drive: 6 plays, 43 yards, 2:14.
- EKU – Patrick Nations 23-yard field goal, 0:00. Eastern Kentucky 10–7. Drive: 15 plays, 84 yards, 2:27.

Third quarter

- EKU – Joshua Carter 18-yard run (Patrick Nations kick), 12:17. Eastern Kentucky 17–7. Drive: 6 plays, 75 yards, 2:01.
- EKU – Dequan Stanley 57-yard pass from Matt Morrissey (Patrick Nations kick), 3:52. Eastern Kentucky 24–7. Drive: 6 plays, 92 yards, 3:21.

Fourth quarter

- EKU – Bryant Johnson 9-yard pass from Matt Morrissey (Patrick Nations kick), 12:09. Eastern Kentucky 31–7. Drive: 10 plays, 80 yards, 4:48.

Statistics	RMU	EKU
First downs	17	23
Total yards	232	513
Rushing yards	71	242
Passing yards	161	271
Passing: Comp–Att–Int	19–38–1	18–34–0
Time of possession	28:05	31:55

Team	Category	Player	Statistics
Robert Morris	Passing	Anthony Chiccitt	18/36, 142 yds, INT
Robert Morris	Rushing	Tyvon Edmonds Jr.	14 rushes, 31 yds
Robert Morris	Receiving	Noah Robinson	9 receptions, 89 yds, TD
Eastern Kentucky	Passing	Matt Morrissey	17/29, 265 yds, 2 TD
Eastern Kentucky	Rushing	Joshua Carter	19 rushes, 123 yds, 2 TD
Eastern Kentucky	Receiving	Dequan Stanley	4 receptions, 78 yds, TD

=== vs. Delaware State ===
Game Six – Delaware State Hornets (1–5) vs Robert Morris Colonials (2–3) – Game summary

Quarter	1	2	3	4	Total
Hornets	0	0	0	0	0
Colonials	0	0	0	0	0

at Joe Walton Stadium, Moon Township, Pennsylvania

- Date: Saturday October 12, 2024
- Game time: 12:00 PM
- TV: NEC Front Row

Game information

First quarter
Second quarter
Third quarter
Fourth quarter

Statistics	DSU	RMU
First downs		
Total yards		
Rushing yards		
Passing yards		
Passing: Comp–Att–Int		
Time of possession		

Team	Category	Player	Statistics
Delaware State	Passing		
Delaware State	Rushing		
Delaware State	Receiving		
Robert Morris	Passing		
Robert Morris	Rushing		
Robert Morris	Receiving		

=== vs. LIU ===
Game Seven – LIU Sharks (1–6) vs Robert Morris Colonials (3–3) – Game summary

Quarter	1	2	3	4	Total
Sharks	0	0	0	0	0
Colonials	0	0	0	0	0

at Joe Walton Stadium, Moon Township, Pennsylvania

- Date: Saturday October 19, 2024
- Game time: 12:00 PM
- TV: NEC Front Row

Game information

First quarter
Second quarter
Third quarter
Fourth quarter

Statistics	LIU	RMU
First downs		
Total yards		
Rushing yards		
Passing yards		
Passing: Comp–Att–Int		
Time of possession		

Team	Category	Player	Statistics
LIU	Passing		
LIU	Rushing		
LIU	Receiving		
Robert Morris	Passing		
Robert Morris	Rushing		
Robert Morris	Receiving		

=== vs. Saint Francis (PA) ===
Game Eight – Saint Francis Red Flash (2–5) vs Robert Morris Colonials (4–3) – Game summary

Quarter	1	2	3	4	Total
Red Flash	0	0	0	0	0
Colonials	0	0	0	0	0

at Joe Walton Stadium, Moon Township, Pennsylvania

- Date: Saturday October 26, 2024
- Game time: 2:00 PM
- TV: NEC Front Row

Game information

First quarter
Second quarter
Third quarter
Fourth quarter

Statistics	SFPA	RMU
First downs		
Total yards		
Rushing yards		
Passing yards		
Passing: Comp–Att–Int		
Time of possession		

Team	Category	Player	Statistics
Saint Francis (PA)	Passing		
Saint Francis (PA)	Rushing		
Saint Francis (PA)	Receiving		
Robert Morris	Passing		
Robert Morris	Rushing		
Robert Morris	Receiving		

=== vs. Merrimack ===
Game Nine – Merrimack Warriors (4–4) vs Robert Morris Colonials (5–3) – Game summary

Quarter	1	2	3	4	Total
Warriors	0	0	0	0	0
Colonials	0	0	0	0	0

at Joe Walton Stadium, Moon Township, Pennsylvania

- Date: Saturday November 2, 2024
- Game time: 12:00 PM
- TV: NEC Front Row

Game information

First quarter
Second quarter
Third quarter
Fourth quarter

Statistics	MRMK	RMU
First downs		
Total yards		
Rushing yards		
Passing yards		
Passing: Comp–Att–Int		
Time of possession		

Team	Category	Player	Statistics
Merrimack	Passing		
Merrimack	Rushing		
Merrimack	Receiving		
Robert Morris	Passing		
Robert Morris	Rushing		
Robert Morris	Receiving		

=== at No. 25 Duquesne ===
Game Nine – Robert Morris Colonials (6–3) vs No. 25 Duquesne Dukes (6–2) – Game summary

Quarter	1	2	3	4	Total
Colonials	0	0	0	0	0
No. 25 Dukes	0	0	0	0	0

at Arthur J. Rooney Athletic Field • Pittsburgh, PA

- Date: Saturday November 9, 2024
- Game time: 12:00 PM EST
- Game weather: 0 °F (−18 °C)
- TV announcers (NEC Front Row): TBD

Game information

First quarter
Second quarter
Third quarter
Fourth quarter

Statistics	RMU	DUQ
First downs		
Total yards		
Rushing yards		
Passing yards		
Passing: Comp–Att–Int		
Time of possession		

Team	Category	Player	Statistics
Robert Morris	Passing		
Robert Morris	Rushing		
Robert Morris	Receiving		
Duquesne	Passing		
Duquesne	Rushing		
Duquesne	Receiving		

=== at Central Connecticut ===
Game Ten – Robert Morris Colonials (6–4) vs Central Connecticut Blue Devils (5–5) – Game summary

Quarter	1	2	3	4	OT	2OT	Total
Colonials	3	14	7	3	0	6	33
Blue Devils	0	10	0	17	0	8	35

at Arute Field • New Britain, CT

- Date: Saturday November 16, 2024
- Game time: 12:00 PM EST
- Game weather: Sunny
- Game attendance: 3,192
- Referee: Travis Barta
- TV announcers (NEC Front Row): Bruce Biel (play-by-play) and Mark Robbins (analyst)

Game information

First quarter

- (4:13) RMU – Jayson Jenkins 23-yard field goal (Drive: 15 plays, 72 yards, 7:48; Robert Morris 3–0)

Second quarter

- (10:31) CCSU – Donny Marcus 2-yard run, Jack Barnum kick (Drive: 7 plays, 85 yards, 3:40; Central Connecticut 7–3)
- (10:17) RMU – Rob Carter Jr. 92 yard kickoff return, Jayson Jenkins kick (Robert Morris 10–7)
- (8:06) RMU – Rob Carter Jr. 50-yard interception, Jayson Jenkins kick (Robert Morris 17–7)
- (0:37) CCSU – Jack Barnum 19-yard field goal (Drive: 14 plays, 80 yards, 4:24; Robert Morris 17–10)

Third quarter

- (7:44) RMU – Carl Smith Jr. 19-yard pass from Anthony Chiccitt, Jayson Jenkins kick (Drive: 4 plays, 53 yards, 1:39; Robert Morris 24–10)

Fourth quarter

- (10:00) CCSU – Peter Cleary 5-yard pass from Brady Olson, Jack Barnum kick (Drive: 11 plays, 64 yards, 5:00; Robert Morris 24–17)
- (7:26) CCSU – Christopher Jean 49-yard fumble recovery, Jack Barnum kick (Tied 24–24)
- (1:13) CCSU – Jack Barnum 20-yard field goal (Drive: 4 plays, 9 yards, 0:38; Central Connecticut 27–24)
- (0:00) RMU – Jayson Jenkins 45-yard field goal (Drive: 8 plays, 38 yards, 1:06; Tied 27–27)

Overtime

- (0:00) RMU – Noah Robinson 18-yard pass from Zach Tanner (Drive: 3 plays, 25 yards, 0:00; Robert Morris 33–27)

Double overtime

- (0:00) CCSU – Elijah Howard 12-yard run, Isaac Boston pass (Drive: 6 plays, 25 yards, 0:00; Central Connecticut 35–33)

Statistics	RMU	CCSU
First downs	16	16
Total yards	304	291
Rushing yards	160	107
Passing yards	144	184
Passing: Comp–Att–Int	15–29–1	12–34–2
Time of possession	32:52	27:04

Team	Category	Player	Statistics
Robert Morris	Passing	Anthony Chiccitt	13/21, 120 yards, TD
Robert Morris	Rushing	DJ Moyer	17 carries, 82 yards
Robert Morris	Receiving	Noah Robinson	4 receptions, 60 yards, TD
Central Connecticut	Passing	Brady Olson	12/34, 184 yards, TD, 2 INT
Central Connecticut	Rushing	Elijah Howard	21 carries, 66 yards, TD
Central Connecticut	Receiving	Michael Plaskon	3 receptions, 48 yards

=== vs. Stonehill ===
Game Eleven – Stonehill Skyhawks (1–9) vs Robert Morris Colonials (6–5) – Game summary

Quarter	1	2	3	4	Total
Skyhawks	0	0	0	0	0
Colonials	0	0	0	0	0

at Joe Walton Stadium, Moon Township, Pennsylvania

- Date: Saturday November 23, 2024
- Game time: 12:00 PM
- TV: NEC Front Row

Game information

First quarter
Second quarter
Third quarter
Fourth quarter

Statistics	STO	RMU
First downs		
Total yards		
Rushing yards		
Passing yards		
Passing: Comp–Att–Int		
Time of possession		

Team	Category	Player	Statistics
Stonehill	Passing		
Stonehill	Rushing		
Stonehill	Receiving		
Robert Morris	Passing		
Robert Morris	Rushing		
Robert Morris	Receiving		
