= DeGol Field =

Stadium in Loretto, Pennsylvania, US

Coordinates: 40.506275°N 78.637244°W

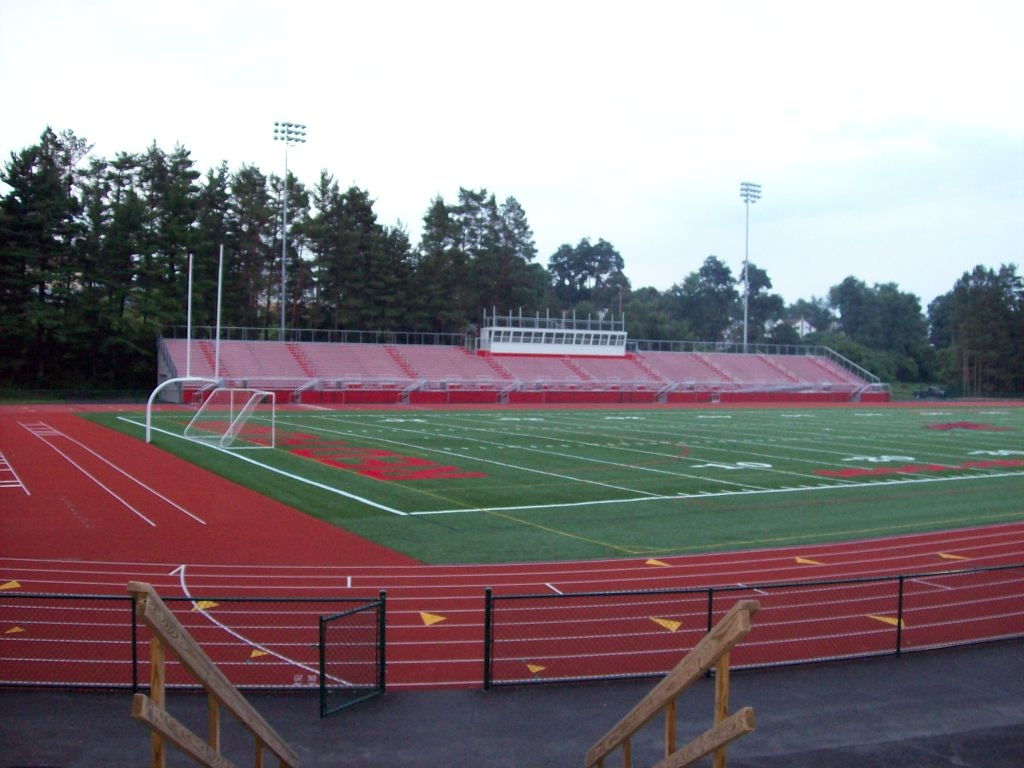
- DeGol Field
- Interactive map of DeGol Field
- Location: 151 Stokes Building; Loretto, PA 15940
- Owner: Saint Francis University
- Operator: Saint Francis University
- Capacity: 3,450
- Surface: SportExe Momentum Turf

Construction
- Groundbreaking: July 12, 2005
- Opened: September 3, 2006
- Cost: $10 million ($16 million in 2025 dollars)
- Architects: Celli-Flynn Brennan Architects & Planners

Tenant
- Saint Francis Red Wolves (NCAA) (2006–present)

DeGol Field is a multi-purpose stadium in Loretto, Pennsylvania, with a seating capacity of 3,450. It is home to the Saint Francis University Red Wolves football, field hockey, lacrosse and track and field teams. The facility opened in 2006. It replaced the Pine Bowl that was built in 1979.

== See also ==
- List of NCAA Division I FCS football stadiums
