= 2024 Presbyterian Blue Hose football team =

American college football season

2024 Presbyterian Blue Hose football
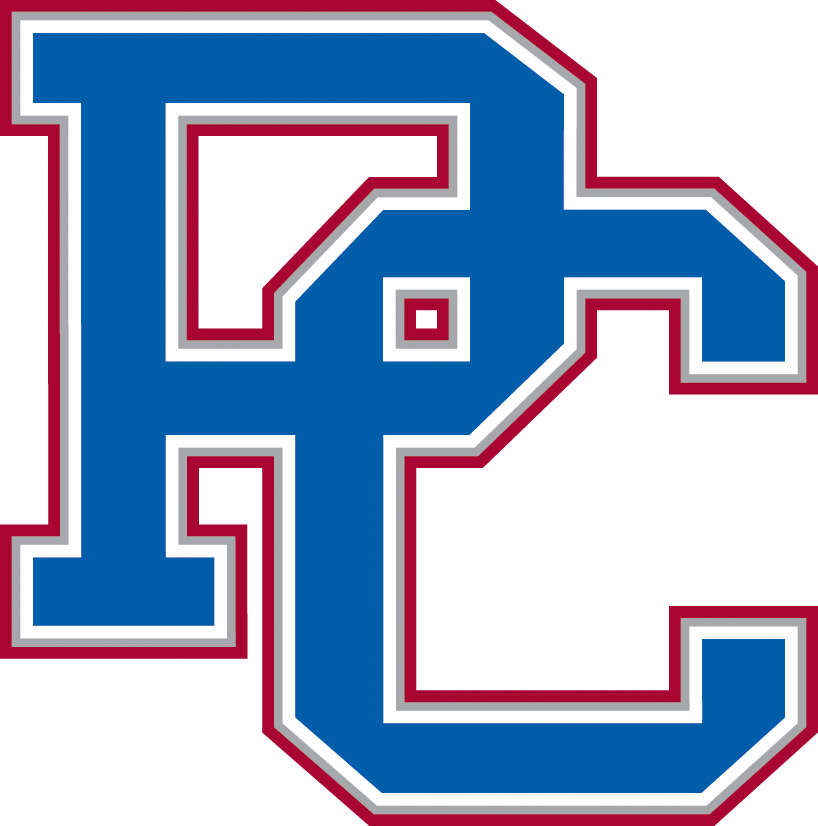
- Conference: Pioneer Football League
- Record: 6–6 (4–4 PFL)
- Head coach: Steve Englehart (3rd season)
- Offensive coordinator: Jayson Martin (3rd season)
- Defensive coordinator: Daniel Owen (3rd season)
- Home stadium: Bailey Memorial Stadium

2024 Pioneer Football League standings
	Conf.			Overall
Team	W		L	W		L
Drake $^	7	–	1	8	–	3
San Diego	6	–	2	8	–	3
Butler	5	–	3	9	–	3
Morehead State	5	–	3	7	–	5
St. Thomas (MN)*	5	–	3	6	–	6
Dayton	4	–	4	6	–	5
Davidson	4	–	4	6	–	5
Presbyterian	4	–	4	6	–	6
Valparaiso	2	–	5	4	–	7
Marist	1	–	7	1	–	10
Stetson	0	–	7	2	–	9
$ – Conference champion; ^ – FCS playoff participant; * – St. Thomas (MN) ineligible for FCS postseason play due to transition from NCAA Division III; Rankings from STATS Poll

The 2024 Presbyterian Blue Hose football team represented Presbyterian College as a member of the Pioneer Football League (PFL) during the 2024 NCAA Division I FCS football season. The Blue Hose were led by third-year head coach Steve Englehart and played home games at Bailey Memorial Stadium in Clinton, South Carolina.

== Schedule ==
Date	Time	Opponent	Site	TV	Result	Attendance
August 29	7:00 p.m.	at Mercer*	Five Star Stadium; Macon, GA	ESPN+	L 10–63	7,219
September 7	1:00 p.m.	at Erskine*	J.W. Babb Stadium; Greenwood, SC		W 31–14	978
September 14	1:00 pm	Virginia–Lynchburg*	Bailey Memorial Stadium; Clinton, SC	ESPN+	W 52–0	2,012
September 21	7:00 p.m.	Gardner–Webb*	Bailey Memorial Stadium; Clinton, SC	ESPN+	L 21–42	1,843
September 29	5:00 p.m.	Davidson	Bailey Memorial Stadium; Clinton, SC	ESPN+	L 37–48	961
October 5	4:00 p.m.	at San Diego	Torero Stadium; San Diego, CA	ESPN+	L 21–27 ^{OT}	1,012
October 12	1:00 p.m.	at Morehead State	Jayne Stadium; Morehead, KY	ESPN+	L 7–14	8,285
October 19	1:00 p.m.	Drake^{†}	Bailey Memorial Stadium; Clinton, SC	ESPN+	L 16–19 ^{OT}	2,515
October 26	1:00 p.m.	at Stetson	Spec Martin Stadium; DeLand, FL	ESPN+	W 42–14	1,777
November 2	1:00 p.m.	Dayton	Bailey Memorial Stadium; Clinton, SC	ESPN+	W 28–7	1,001
November 16	12:00 p.m.	at Marist	Tenney Stadium at Leonidoff Field; Poughkeepsie, NY	ESPN+	W 42–23	1,393
November 23	1:00 p.m.	Butler	Bailey Memorial Stadium; Clinton, SC	ESPN+	W 30–27	4,000
*Non-conference game; ^{†}Homecoming; All times are in Eastern time

== Game summaries ==
=== at Mercer ===
Game One – Presbyterian Blue Hose (0–0) at Mercer Bears (0–0) – Game summary

Quarter	1	2	3	4	Total
Blue Hose	3	0	7	0	10
Bears	14	14	14	21	63

at Five Star Stadium • Macon, GA

- Date: Thursday August 29, 2024
- Game time: 7:00 p.m.
- Game weather: Cloudy • Temperature: 91 °F (33 °C) • Wind: S at 6 miles per hour (9.7 km/h)
- Game attendance: 7,219
- Referee: Michael Farmer
- TV announcers (FloSports): TBD

Game information

First quarter

- (11:42) MER – Dwayne McGee 3-yard run, Reice Griffith kick (Drive: 5 plays, 64 yards, 1:45; Mercer 7–0)
- (5:17) PRE – Mack Mikko 24-yard field goal (Drive: 6 plays, 54 yards, 2:14; Mercer 7–3)
- (1:08) MER – Kelin Parsons 13-yard pass from DJ Smith, Reice Griffith kick (Drive: 8 plays, 62 yards, 4:02; Mercer 14–3)

Second quarter

- (8:40) MER – DJ Smith 1-yard run, Reice Griffith kick (Drive: 4 plays, 47 yards, 1:45; Mercer 21–3)
- (1:16) MER – Tyrell Coard 4-yard run, Reice Griffith kick (Drive: 10 plays, 71 yards, 4:00; Mercer 28–3)

Third quarter

- (13:45) MER – Brayden Smith 68-yard pass from DJ Smith, Reice Griffith kick (Drive: 3 plays, 77 yards, 1:10; Mercer 35–3)
- (4:57) MER – Tyrell Coard 9-yard pass from DJ Smith, Reice Griffith kick (Drive: 13 plays, 83 yards, 7:37; Mercer 42–3)
- (3:34) PRE – Cincere Gill 24-yard pass from Ty Englehart, Mack Mikko kick (Drive: 5 plays, 75 yards, 1:23; Mercer 42–10)

Fourth quarter

- (10:48) MER – Parker Wroble 7-yard pass from Hess Horne, Reice Griffith kick (Drive: 8 plays, 37 yards, 4:05; Mercer 49–10)
- (3:58) MER – Chris Joines 0-yard fumble recovery, Reice Griffith kick (Mercer 56–10)
- (1:39) MER – Brayden Smith 75-yard punt return, Reice Griffith kick (Mercer 63–10)

Statistics	PRES	MER
First downs	8	25
Total yards	137	500
Rushing yards	-7	139
Passing yards	144	361
Passing: Comp–Att–Int	10–23–2	25–30–1
Time of possession	27:47	32:13

Team	Category	Player	Statistics
Presbyterian	Passing	Ty Englehart	7/19, 84 yards, TD, 2 INT
Presbyterian	Rushing	Denim Edwards	6 carries, 15 yards
Presbyterian	Receiving	Nathan Levicki	1 reception, 57 yards
Mercer	Passing	DJ Smith	20/24, 331 yards, 3 TD, INT
Mercer	Rushing	Dwayne McGee	16 carries, 57 yards, TD
Mercer	Receiving	Brayden Smith	3 receptions, 83 yards, TD

=== at Erskine (DII) ===
Game Two – Presbyterian Blue Hose (0–1) at Erskine Flying Fleet (DII) (0–0) – Game summary

Quarter	1	2	3	4	Total
Blue Hose	7	14	7	3	31
Flying Feet (DII)	0	7	0	7	14

at J.W. Babb Stadium • Greenwood, SC

- Date: Saturday September 7, 2024
- Game time: 1:00 p.m.
- Game weather: Sunny
- Game attendance: 978
- Referee: Eddie Smith
- TV announcers: TBD

Game information

First quarter

- (10:05) PRE – Zach Switzer 67-yard pass from Collin Hurst, Mack Mikko kick (Drive: 4 plays, 84 yards, 1:53; Presbyterian 7–0)

Second quarter

- (13:33) PRE – Cincere Gill 9-yard pass from Collin Hurst, Mack Mikko kick (Drive: 1 play, 9 yards, 0:06; Presbyterian 14–0)
- (4:13) ERS – Rodshaun Dorsey 12-yard pass from Craig Pender, Dylan Beauford kick (Drive: 12 plays, 64 yards, 5:19; Presbyterian 14–7)
- (4:01) PRE – Zach Switzer 90-yard kickoff return, Mack Mikko kick (Presbyterian 21–7)

Third quarter

- (5:53) PRE – Justin Montgomery 19-yard run, Mack Mikko kick (Drive: 4 plays, 34 yards, 1:24; Presbyterian 28–7)

Fourth quarter

- (11:13) ERS – Rodshaun Dorsey 9-yard pass from Craig Pender, Dylan Beauford kick (Drive: 15 plays, 85 yards, 9:35; Presbyterian 28–14)
- (6:54) PRE – Mack Mikko 23-yard field goal (Drive: 10 plays, 64 yards, 4:11; Presbyterian 31–14)

Statistics	PRES	ERSK
First downs	16	14
Total yards	385	269
Rushing yards	184	72
Passing yards	201	197
Passing: Comp–Att–Int	9–16–1	22–38–2
Time of possession	24:34	35:26

Team	Category	Player	Statistics
Presbyterian	Passing	Collin Hurst	9/16, 201 yards, 2 TD, INT
Presbyterian	Rushing	Zach Switzer	7 carries, 50 yards
Presbyterian	Receiving	Zach Switzer	1 reception, 67 yards, TD
Erskine	Passing	Craig Pender	22/38, 197 yards, 2 TD, 2 INT
Erskine	Rushing	Rashad Luckey	19 carries, 58 yards
Erskine	Receiving	Rodshaun Dorsey	7 receptions, 69 yards, 2 TD

=== VUL (NCCAA) ===
Game Three – VUL Dragons (NCCAA) (0–2) at Presbyterian Blue Hose (1–1) – Game summary

Quarter	1	2	3	4	Total
Dragons (NCCAA)	0	0	0	0	0
Blue Hose	10	28	14	0	52

at Bailey Memorial Stadium • Clinton, SC

- Date: Saturday September 14, 2024
- Game time: 1:00 p.m.
- Game weather: Cloudy • Temperature: 74 °F (23 °C) • Wind: NE at 9 miles per hour (14 km/h)
- Game attendance: 2,536
- Referee: Klee Sellers
- TV: ESPN+

Game information

First quarter

- (8:03) PRES – Zach Switzer 6-yard run, Mack Mikko kick (Drive: 6 plays, 46 yards, 2:29; Presbyterian 7–0)
- (5:42) PRES – Mack Mikko 33-yard field goal (Drive: 7 plays, 15 yards, 1:51; Presbyterian 10–0)

Second quarter

- (13:37) PRES – Nathan Levicki 5-yard pass from Ty Englehart, Mack Mikko kick (Drive: 4 plays, 33 yards, 2:32; Presbyterian 17–0)
- (10:21) PRES – Nathan Levicki 19-yard pass from Collin Hurst, Mack Mikko kick (Drive: 3 plays, 76 yards, 1:18; Presbyterian 24–0)
- (6:51) PRES – Antonio Wright 4-yard run, Mack Mikko kick (Drive: 6 plays, 44 yards, 2:25; Presbyterian 31–0)
- (0:19) PRES – Collin Hurst 1-yard run, Mack Mikko kick (Drive: 6 plays, 66 yards, 1:20; Presbyterian 38–0)

Third quarter

- (6:05) PRES – Dominic Kirby 47-yard pass from Ty Englehart, Peter Lipscombe kick (Drive: 8 plays, 91 yards, 3:47; Presbyterian 45–0)
- (2:04) PRES – Jayden Pressey 35-yard pass from Warner Bush, Peter Lipscombe kick (Drive: 1 play, 35 yards, 0:08; Presbyterian 52–0)

Fourth quarter

No scoring plays

Statistics	VUL	PRES
First downs	8	25
Total yards	72	448
Rushing yards	-4	197
Passing yards	76	251
Passing: Comp–Att–Int	15–36–0	15–24–0
Time of possession	28:36	31:00

Team	Category	Player	Statistics
VUL	Passing	Matthew Jenks	14/35, 76 yards
VUL	Rushing	Jacob Newman	9 carries, 29 yards
VUL	Receiving	Ryan Sims	10 receptions, 45 yards
Presbyterian	Passing	Ty Englehart	5/5, 107 yards, 2 TD
Presbyterian	Rushing	Quante Jennings	7 carries, 59 yards
Presbyterian	Receiving	Dominic Kibby	7 receptions, 155 yards, TD

=== Gardner–Webb ===
Game Four – Gardner–Webb Runnin' Bulldogs (0–3) at Presbyterian Blue Hose (2–1) – Game summary

Quarter	1	2	3	4	Total
Runnin' Bulldogs	7	14	0	21	42
Blue Hose	0	14	0	7	21

at Bailey Memorial Stadium • Clinton, SC

- Date: Saturday September 21, 2024
- Game time: 7:00 p.m.
- Game weather: Sunny, 84 °F (29 °C)
- Game attendance: 1,843
- Referee: Jake Grombach
- TV announcers (ESPN+): TBD

Game information

First quarter

Second quarter

Third quarter

Fourth quarter

Statistics	GWEB	PRES
First downs	26	15
Total yards	485	322
Rushing yards	247	25
Passing yards	238	297
Passing: Comp–Att–Int	19–28–1	22–36–0
Time of possession	37:22	22:38

Team	Category	Player	Statistics
Gardner–Webb	Passing	Tyler Ridell	19/26, 238 yards, 1 TD, 1 INT
Gardner–Webb	Rushing	Carson Gresock	22 carries, 134 yards, 3 TD
Gardner–Webb	Receiving	Giovanni Adopte	5 receptions, 72 yards, 1 TD
Presbyterian	Passing	Collin Hurst	14/22, 199 yards, 2 TD
Presbyterian	Rushing	Antonio Wright	4 carries, 16 yards
Presbyterian	Receiving	Cincere Gill	2 receptions, 69 yards, 1 TD

=== Drake ===
Game Eight – Drake Bulldogs (4–1) at Presbyterian Blue Hose (2–5) – Game summary

Quarter	1	2	3	4	OT	Total
Bulldogs	0	10	0	3	6	19
Blue Hose	6	7	0	0	3	16

at Bailey Memorial Stadium • Clinton, SC

- Date: Saturday October 19, 2024
- Game time: 1:00 p.m.
- Game weather: Sunny, 67 °F (19 °C) • Wind: NE at 6 miles per hour (9.7 km/h)
- Game attendance: 2,515
- Referee: Brian Hilpisch
- TV: ESPN+

Game information

First quarter

- (0:48) PC – Justin Montgomery 2-yard run (kick failed) (Drive: 4 plays, 91 yards, 1:34; PC 6–0)

Second quarter

- (11:33) Drake – Taj Hughes 25-yard run (Shane Dunning kick) (Drive: 7 plays, 68 yards, 4:09; Drake 7–6)
- (5:02) PC – Nigel Brown 1 yard pass from Collin Hurst (Peter Lipscombe kick) (Drive: 5 plays, 50 yards, 1:44; PC 13–7)
- (11:33) Drake – Shane Dunning 36-yard field goal (Drive: 11 plays, 56 yards, 4:54; PC 13–10)

Third quarter

No scoring plays

Fourth quarter

- (4:17) Drake – Shane Dunning 37-yard field goal (Drive: 10 plays, 71 yards, 4:48; Tied 13–13)

Overtime

- PC – Jett Jackson 42-yard field goal (Drive: 4 plays, 0 yards; PC 16–13)
- Drake – Davion Cherwin 11-yard run (Drive: 3 plays, 25 yards; Drake 19–16)

Statistics	DRKE	PRES
First downs	22	17
Total yards	435	346
Rushing yards	60	145
Passing yards	375	201
Passing: Comp–Att–Int	30–42–2	26–35–0
Time of possession	29:56	30:04

Team	Category	Player	Statistics
Drake	Passing	Luke Bailey	30/41, 375 yards, INT
Drake	Rushing	Taj Hughes	3 carries, 34 yards, TD
Drake	Receiving	Trey Radocha	9 receptions, 125 yards
Presbyterian	Passing	Collin Hurst	26/35, 201 yards, TD
Presbyterian	Rushing	Zach Switzer	7 carries, 87 yards
Presbyterian	Receiving	Cincere Gil	8 receptions, 75 yards
