= 2024 Bucknell Bison football team =

American college football season

2024 Bucknell Bison football
- Conference: Patriot League
- Record: 6–6 (4–2 Patriot)
- Head coach: Dave Cecchini (6th season)
- Offensive coordinator: John Bear (1st season)
- Defensive coordinator: Chris Bowers (3rd season)
- Home stadium: Christy Mathewson–Memorial Stadium

2024 Patriot League football standings
| | Conf. | | | Overall |
| Team | W | | L | W | | L |
|---|---|---|---|---|---|---|
| No. 20 Lehigh +^ | 5 | – | 1 | 9 | – | 4 |
| Holy Cross + | 5 | – | 1 | 6 | – | 6 |
| Bucknell | 4 | – | 2 | 6 | – | 6 |
| Lafayette | 2 | – | 4 | 6 | – | 6 |
| Georgetown | 2 | – | 4 | 5 | – | 6 |
| Fordham | 2 | – | 4 | 2 | – | 10 |
| Colgate | 1 | – | 5 | 2 | – | 10 |
+ – Conference co-champions; ^ – FCS playoff participant; Rankings from STATS Poll

The 2024 Bucknell Bison football team represented Bucknell University as a member of the Patriot League during the 2024 NCAA Division I FCS football season. The Bison were led by sixth-year head coach Dave Cecchini and played their home games at Christy Mathewson–Memorial Stadium in Lewisburg, Pennsylvania.

== Schedule ==
| Date | Time | Opponent | Site | TV | Result | Attendance |
|---|---|---|---|---|---|---|
| August 31 | 12:00 p.m. | at Navy* | Navy–Marine Corps Memorial Stadium; Annapolis, MD | CBSSN | L 21-49 | 28,763 |
| September 7 | 1:30 p.m. | at VMI* | Alumni Memorial Field; Lexington, VA | ESPN+ | W 35–28 | 6,295 |
| September 14 | 6:00 p.m. | Merrimack* | Christy Mathewson–Memorial Stadium; Lewisburg, PA | ESPN+ | L 21–31 | 1,943 |
| September 21 | 6:00 p.m. | Marist* | Christy Mathewson–Memorial Stadium; Lewisburg, PA | ESPN+ | W 34–18 | 2,474 |
| September 28 | 12:00 p.m. | at Lehigh | Goodman Stadium; Lower Saucon, PA | ESPN+ | W 38–35 ^{2OT} | 4,003 |
| October 12 | 1:00 p.m. | at Penn* | Franklin Field; Philadelphia, PA | ESPN+ | L 21–31 | 2,054 |
| October 19 | 1:00 p.m. | Cornell*^{†} | Christy Mathewson–Memorial Stadium; Lewisburg, PA | ESPN+ | L 21–34 | 1,245 |
| October 26 | 2:00 p.m. | at Georgetown | Cooper Field; Washington, DC | ESPN+ | L 20–21 | 3,579 |
| November 2 | 1:00 p.m. | Lafayette | Christy Mathewson–Memorial Stadium; Lewisburg, PA | ESPN+ | W 21–14 | 808 |
| November 9 | 1:00 p.m. | Fordham | Christy Mathewson–Memorial Stadium; Lewisburg, PA | ESPN+ | W 28–27 | 881 |
| November 16 | 12:00 p.m. | at Holy Cross | Fitton Field; Worcester, MA | ESPN+ | L 38–40 | 11,357 |
| November 23 | 1:00 p.m. | Colgate | Christy Mathewson–Memorial Stadium; Lewisburg, PA | ESPN+ | W 48–34 | 762 |
*Non-conference game; ^{†}Homecoming; All times are in Eastern time

== Game summaries ==
=== at Navy (FBS) ===
Game One – Bucknell Bison (0–0) vs Navy Midshipmen (FBS) (0–0) – Game summary

| Quarter | 1 | 2 | 3 | 4 | Total |
|---|---|---|---|---|---|
| Bison | 7 | 0 | 7 | 7 | 21 |
| Midshipmen (FBS) | 6 | 22 | 7 | 14 | 49 |

at Navy–Marine Corps Memorial Stadium, Annapolis, Maryland

- Date: Saturday August 31, 2024
- Game time: 12:00 PM
- Game weather: Cloudy • Temperature: 78 °F (26 °C) • Wind: SE at 9 miles per hour (14 km/h)
- Game attendance: 28,763
- Referee: Steven Anderson
- TV announcers (CBSSN): Carter Blackburn (play-by-play), Randy Cross (analyst), Sheehan Stanwick-Burch (sideline reporter)

Game information

First quarter

- (13:37) BUCK – Nate Anderson 47 yard pass from Ralph Rucker IV, Matt Schearer kick (Drive: 4 plays, 65 yards, 1:23; Bucknell 7–0)
- (10:44) NAVY – Daba Fofana 49 yard run, kick failed (Drive: 1 play, 49 yards, 0:09; Bucknell 7–6)

Second quarter

- (14:56) NAVY – Alex Tecza 3 yard run, Nathan Kirkwood kick (Drive: 5 plays, 23 yards, 1:36; Navy 13–7)
- (5:29) NAVY – Eli Heidenreich 9 yard pass from Blake Horvath, Nathan Kirkwood kick (Drive: 9 plays, 59 yards, 3:29; Navy 20–7)
- (0:14) NAVY – Brandon Chatman 42 yard pass from Blake Horvath, 2-point pass (Drive: 1 play, 42 yards, 0:14; Navy 28–7)

Third quarter

- (11:12) NAVY – Eli Heidenreich 20 yard pass from Braxton Woodson, Nathan Kirkwood kick (Drive: 9 plays, 49 yards, 3:41; Navy 35–7)
- (3:06) BUCK – Paul Neel 3 yard run, Matt Schearer kick (Drive: 9 plays, 40 yards, 2:44; Navy 35–14)

Fourth quarter

- (8:33) NAVY – Braxton Woodson 1 yard run, Nathan Kirkwood kick (Drive: 7 plays, 58 yards, 3:07; Navy 42–14)
- (2:10) NAVY – Shane Reynolds 5 yard run, Nathan Kirkwood kick (Drive: 7 plays, 31 yards, 4:34; Navy 49–14)
- (0:30) BUCK – Michael Cadden 2 yard run, Matt Schearer kick (Drive: 7 plays, 75 yards, 1:40; Navy 49–21)

| Statistics | BUCK | NAVY |
|---|---|---|
| First downs | 14 | 20 |
| Total yards | 337 | 437 |
| Rushing yards | 131 | 264 |
| Passing yards | 206 | 173 |
| Passing: Comp–Att–Int | 15–29–0 | 10–19–2 |
| Time of possession | 26:59 | 33:01 |

| Team | Category | Player | Statistics |
|---|---|---|---|
| Bucknell | Passing | Ralph Rucker IV | 11/24, 122 yards, 1 TD |
| Bucknell | Rushing | Paul Neel | 12 carries, 60 yards, 1 TD |
| Bucknell | Receiving | TJ Cadden | 5 receptions, 97 yards |
| Navy | Passing | Blake Horvath | 7/12, 108 yards, 2 TD, 1 INT |
| Navy | Rushing | Daba Fofana | 8 carries, 82 yards, 1 TD |
| Navy | Receiving | Eli Heidenreich | 4 receptions, 74 yards, 2 TD |

=== at VMI ===
Game Two – Bucknell Bison (0–1) vs VMI Keydets (0–1) – Game summary

| Quarter | 1 | 2 | 3 | 4 | Total |
|---|---|---|---|---|---|
| Bison | 7 | 7 | 14 | 7 | 35 |
| Keydets | 7 | 7 | 0 | 14 | 28 |

at Alumni Memorial Field, Lexington, Virginia

- Date: Saturday September 7, 2024
- Game time: 1:30 PM
- Game weather: Sunny, 73 °F (23 °C)
- Game attendance: 6,295
- Referee: Brian Hilpisch
- TV: ESPN+

Game information

First quarter

- (8:04) VMI – Asa Locks 48-yard interception, Caden Beck kick (VMI 7–0)
- (2:29) BUC – TJ Cadden 40-yard punt return, Matt Schearer kick (Tied 7–7)

Second quarter

- (9:22) BUC – Paul Neel 2-yard run, Matt Schearer kick (Drive: 12 plays, 65 yards, 6:04; Bucknell 14–7)
- (4:55) VMI – Hunter Rice 58-yard run, Caden Beck kick (Drive: 4 plays, 69 yards, 1:03; Tied 14–14)

Third quarter

- (11:35) BUC – Josh Gary 10-yard pass from Ralph Rucker IV, Matt Schearer kick (Drive: 8 plays, 81 yards, 3:25; Bucknell 21–14)
- (6:35) BUC – Josh Gary 41-yard pass from Ralph Rucker IV, Matt Schearer kick (Drive: 5 plays, 61 yards, 2:20; Bucknell 28–14)

Fourth quarter

- (12:14) BUC – TJ Cadden 35-yard pass from Ralph Rucker IV, Matt Schearer kick (Drive: 7 plays, 79 yards, 3:23; Bucknell 35–14)
- (8:13) VMI – Hunter Rice 2-yard run, Caden Beck kick (Drive: 8 plays, 75 yards, 4:01; Bucknell 35–21)
- (0:29) VMI – Ryan von Brandt 17-yard pass from Chandler Wilson, Caden Beck kick (Drive: 8 plays, 80 yards, 2:25; Bucknell 35–28)

| Statistics | BUCK | VMI |
|---|---|---|
| First downs | 22 | 20 |
| Total yards | 451 | 378 |
| Rushing yards | 111 | 212 |
| Passing yards | 340 | 166 |
| Passing: Comp–Att–Int | 28–37–1 | 24–37–1 |
| Time of possession | 29:14 | 30:46 |

| Team | Category | Player | Statistics |
|---|---|---|---|
| Bucknell | Passing | Ralph Rucker IV | 28/37, 340 yards, 3 TD, INT |
| Bucknell | Rushing | Paul Neel | 8 carries, 37 yards, TD |
| Bucknell | Receiving | Eric Weatherly | 9 receptions, 105 yards |
| VMI | Passing | Collin Shannon | 21/32, 129 yards, INT |
| VMI | Rushing | Hunter Rice | 18 carries, 166 yards, 2 TD |
| VMI | Receiving | Ivan Thorpe | 6 receptions, 47 yards |

=== Merrimack ===
Game Three – Merrimack Warriors (0–2) at Bucknell Bison (1–1) – Game summary

| Quarter | 1 | 2 | 3 | 4 | Total |
|---|---|---|---|---|---|
| Warriors | 0 | 0 | 0 | 0 | 0 |
| Bison | 0 | 0 | 0 | 0 | 0 |

at Christy Mathewson–Memorial Stadium • Lewisburg, Pennsylvania

- Date: Saturday September 14, 2024
- Game time: 6:00 PM
- Game weather: 0 °F (−18 °C)
- TV: ESPN+

Game information

First quarter
Second quarter
Third quarter
Fourth quarter

| Statistics | MRMK | BUCK |
|---|---|---|
| First downs | | |
| Total yards | | |
| Rushing yards | | |
| Passing yards | | |
| Passing: Comp–Att–Int | | |
| Time of possession | | |

| Team | Category | Player | Statistics |
|---|---|---|---|
| Merrimack | Passing | | |
| Merrimack | Rushing | | |
| Merrimack | Receiving | | |
| Bucknell | Passing | | |
| Bucknell | Rushing | | |
| Bucknell | Receiving | | |

=== Marist ===
Game Four – Marist Red Foxes (0–2) at Bucknell Bison (1–2) – Game summary

| Quarter | 1 | 2 | 3 | 4 | Total |
|---|---|---|---|---|---|
| Red Foxes | 0 | 0 | 0 | 0 | 0 |
| Bison | 0 | 0 | 0 | 0 | 0 |

at Christy Mathewson–Memorial Stadium • Lewisburg, Pennsylvania

- Date: Saturday September 21, 2024
- Game time: 6:00 PM
- Game weather: 0 °F (−18 °C)
- TV: ESPN+

Game information

First quarter
Second quarter
Third quarter
Fourth quarter

| Statistics | MRST | BUCK |
|---|---|---|
| First downs | | |
| Total yards | | |
| Rushing yards | | |
| Passing yards | | |
| Passing: Comp–Att–Int | | |
| Time of possession | | |

| Team | Category | Player | Statistics |
|---|---|---|---|
| Marist | Passing | | |
| Marist | Rushing | | |
| Marist | Receiving | | |
| Bucknell | Passing | | |
| Bucknell | Rushing | | |
| Bucknell | Receiving | | |

=== at Lehigh ===
Game Five – Bucknell Bison (2–2) at Lehigh Mountain Hawks (3–1) – Game summary

| Quarter | 1 | 2 | 3 | 4 | OT | 2OT | Total |
|---|---|---|---|---|---|---|---|
| Bison | 0 | 14 | 7 | 7 | 3 | 7 | 38 |
| Mountain Hawks | 7 | 7 | 7 | 7 | 7 | 0 | 35 |

at Goodman Stadium • Lower Saucon Township, Pennsylvania

- Date: Saturday September 28, 2024
- Game time: 12:00 p.m. EST
- Game attendance: 4,003
- TV announcers (ESPN+): TBD

Game information

First quarter

Second quarter

Third quarter

Fourth quarter

| Statistics | BUCK | LEH |
|---|---|---|
| First downs | | |
| Total yards | | |
| Rushing yards | | |
| Passing yards | | |
| Passing: Comp–Att–Int | | |
| Time of possession | | |

| Team | Category | Player | Statistics |
|---|---|---|---|
| Bucknell | Passing | | |
| Bucknell | Rushing | | |
| Bucknell | Receiving | | |
| Lehigh | Passing | | |
| Lehigh | Rushing | | |
| Lehigh | Receiving | | |

=== at Penn ===
Game Six – Bucknell Bison (3–2) at Penn Quakers (1–2) – Game summary

| Quarter | 1 | 2 | 3 | 4 | Total |
|---|---|---|---|---|---|
| Bison | 0 | 0 | 0 | 0 | 0 |
| Quakers | 0 | 0 | 0 | 0 | 0 |

at Franklin Field • Philadelphia, Pennsylvania

- Date: Saturday October 12, 2024
- Game time: 1:00 p.m. EST
- TV announcers (ESPN+): TBD

Game information

First quarter

Second quarter

Third quarter

Fourth quarter

| Statistics | BUCK | PENN |
|---|---|---|
| First downs | | |
| Total yards | | |
| Rushing yards | | |
| Passing yards | | |
| Passing: Comp–Att–Int | | |
| Time of possession | | |

| Team | Category | Player | Statistics |
|---|---|---|---|
| Bucknell | Passing | | |
| Bucknell | Rushing | | |
| Bucknell | Receiving | | |
| Penn | Passing | | |
| Penn | Rushing | | |
| Penn | Receiving | | |

=== Cornell ===
Game Seven – Cornell Big Red (1–3) at Bucknell Bison (3–3) – Game summary

| Quarter | 1 | 2 | 3 | 4 | Total |
|---|---|---|---|---|---|
| Big Red | 0 | 0 | 0 | 0 | 0 |
| Bison | 0 | 0 | 0 | 0 | 0 |

at Christy Mathewson–Memorial Stadium • Lewisburg, Pennsylvania

- Date: Saturday October 19, 2024
- Game time: 1:00 PM
- Game weather: 0 °F (−18 °C)
- TV: ESPN+

Game information

First quarter
Second quarter
Third quarter
Fourth quarter

| Statistics | COR | BUCK |
|---|---|---|
| First downs | | |
| Total yards | | |
| Rushing yards | | |
| Passing yards | | |
| Passing: Comp–Att–Int | | |
| Time of possession | | |

| Team | Category | Player | Statistics |
|---|---|---|---|
| Cornell | Passing | | |
| Cornell | Rushing | | |
| Cornell | Receiving | | |
| Bucknell | Passing | | |
| Bucknell | Rushing | | |
| Bucknell | Receiving | | |

=== at Georgetown ===
Game Eight – Bucknell Bison (3–4) at Georgetown Hoyas (4–3) – Game summary

| Quarter | 1 | 2 | 3 | 4 | Total |
|---|---|---|---|---|---|
| Bison | 7 | 10 | 0 | 3 | 20 |
| Hoyas | 0 | 14 | 7 | 0 | 21 |

at Cooper Field • Washington, D.C.

- Date: Saturday October 26, 2024
- Game time: 2:00 p.m. EST
- Game attendance: 3,579
- TV announcers (ESPN+): TBD

Game information

First quarter

- BUCK – Tariq Thomas 15 Yd Run (Matt Schearer Kick), 12:03. Bison 7–0. Drive: 7 plays, 75 yards, 2:57.

Second quarter

- BUCK – Tariq Thomas 27 Yd Run (Matt Schearer Kick), 14:46. Bison 14–0. Drive: 5 plays, 58 yards, 1:39.
- GTWN – Savion Hart 40 Yd Run (Patrick Ryan Kick), 4:29. Bison 14–7. Drive: 4 plays, 70 yards, 2:01.
- GTWN – Nicholas Dunneman 11 Yd pass from Danny Lauter (Patrick Ryan Kick), 0:14. Tied 14–14. Drive: 10 plays, 76 yards, 2:10.
- BUCK – Matt Schearer 43 Yd Field Goal, 00:00. Bison 17–14. Drive: 3 plays, 39 yards, 0:14.

Third quarter

- GTWN – Bryce Cox 1 Yd Run (Patrick Ryan Kick), 5:56. Hoyas 21–17. Drive: 12 plays, 81 yards, 6:53.

Fourth quarter

- BUCK – Matt Schearer 32 Yd Field Goal, 9:14. Hoyas 21–20. Drive: 9 plays, 65 yards, 3:25.

| Statistics | BUCK | GTWN |
|---|---|---|
| First downs | 19 | 24 |
| Total yards | 368 | 404 |
| Rushing yards | 142 | 274 |
| Passing yards | 226 | 130 |
| Passing: Comp–Att–Int | 17−29−0 | 13−24−1 |
| Time of possession | 22:40 | 37:20 |

| Team | Category | Player | Statistics |
|---|---|---|---|
| Bucknell | Passing | Ralph Rucker IV | 17/29, 226 yards |
| Bucknell | Rushing | Tariq Thomas | 25 carries, 145 yards, 2 TDs |
| Bucknell | Receiving | Josh Gary | 5 receptions, 91 yards |
| Georgetown | Passing | Danny Lauter | 13/23, 130 yards, 1 TD, 1 INT |
| Georgetown | Rushing | Savion Hart | 17 carries, 112 yards, 1 TD |
| Georgetown | Receiving | Jimmy Kibble | 4 receptions, 64 yards |

=== Lafayette ===
Game Nine – Lafayette Leopards (4–4) vs Bucknell Bison (3–5) – Game summary

| Quarter | 1 | 2 | 3 | 4 | Total |
|---|---|---|---|---|---|
| Leopards | 0 | 0 | 0 | 0 | 0 |
| Bison | 0 | 0 | 0 | 0 | 0 |

at Christy Mathewson-Memorial Stadium, Lewisburg, PA

- Date: Saturday November 2, 2024
- Game time: 1:00 PM
- TV announcers (ESPN+): TBD

Game information

First quarter
Second quarter
Third quarter
Fourth quarter

| Statistics | LAF | BUCK |
|---|---|---|
| First downs | | |
| Total yards | | |
| Rushing yards | | |
| Passing yards | | |
| Passing: Comp–Att–Int | | |
| Time of possession | | |

| Team | Category | Player | Statistics |
|---|---|---|---|
| Lafayette | Passing | | |
| Lafayette | Rushing | | |
| Lafayette | Receiving | | |
| Bucknell | Passing | | |
| Bucknell | Rushing | | |
| Bucknell | Receiving | | |

=== Fordham ===
Game Ten – Fordham Rams (1–8) vs Bucknell Bison (4–5) – Game summary

| Quarter | 1 | 2 | 3 | 4 | Total |
|---|---|---|---|---|---|
| Rams | 0 | 0 | 0 | 0 | 0 |
| Bison | 0 | 0 | 0 | 0 | 0 |

at Christy Mathewson-Memorial Stadium • Lewisburg, PA

- Date: Saturday November 9, 2024
- Game time: 1:00 p.m.
- Game weather: 0 °F (−18 °C)
- TV: ESPN+

Game information

First quarter
Second quarter
Third quarter
Fourth quarter

| Statistics | FOR | BUCK |
|---|---|---|
| First downs | | |
| Total yards | | |
| Rushing yards | | |
| Passing yards | | |
| Passing: Comp–Att–Int | | |
| Time of possession | | |

| Team | Category | Player | Statistics |
|---|---|---|---|
| Fordham | Passing | | |
| Fordham | Rushing | | |
| Fordham | Receiving | | |
| Bucknell | Passing | | |
| Bucknell | Rushing | | |
| Bucknell | Receiving | | |

=== at Holy Cross ===
Game Eleven – Bucknell Bison (5–5) at Holy Cross Crusaders (4–6) – Game summary

| Quarter | 1 | 2 | 3 | 4 | Total |
|---|---|---|---|---|---|
| Bison | 0 | 0 | 0 | 0 | 0 |
| Crusaders | 0 | 0 | 0 | 0 | 0 |

at Fitton Field • Worcester, MA

- Date: Saturday November 16, 2024
- Game time: 12:00 p.m. EST
- TV announcers (ESPN+): TBD

Game information

First quarter

Second quarter

Third quarter

Fourth quarter

| Statistics | BUCK | HC |
|---|---|---|
| First downs | | |
| Total yards | | |
| Rushing yards | | |
| Passing yards | | |
| Passing: Comp–Att–Int | | |
| Time of possession | | |

| Team | Category | Player | Statistics |
|---|---|---|---|
| Bucknell | Passing | | |
| Bucknell | Rushing | | |
| Bucknell | Receiving | | |
| Holy Cross | Passing | | |
| Holy Cross | Rushing | | |
| Holy Cross | Receiving | | |

=== Colgate ===
Game Twelve – Colgate Raiders (2–9) at Bucknell Bison (5–6) – Game summary

| Quarter | 1 | 2 | 3 | 4 | Total |
|---|---|---|---|---|---|
| Raiders | 0 | 0 | 0 | 0 | 0 |
| Bison | 0 | 0 | 0 | 0 | 0 |

at Christy Mathewson-Memorial Stadium • Lewisburg, Pennsylvania

- Date: Saturday November 23, 2024
- Game time: 1:00 PM
- Game weather: 0 °F (−18 °C)
- TV: ESPN+

Game information

First quarter
Second quarter
Third quarter
Fourth quarter

| Statistics | COLG | BUCK |
|---|---|---|
| First downs | | |
| Total yards | | |
| Rushing yards | | |
| Passing yards | | |
| Passing: Comp–Att–Int | | |
| Time of possession | | |

| Team | Category | Player | Statistics |
|---|---|---|---|
| Colgate | Passing | | |
| Colgate | Rushing | | |
| Colgate | Receiving | | |
| Bucknell | Passing | | |
| Bucknell | Rushing | | |
| Bucknell | Receiving | | |
