= 2024 Georgetown Hoyas football team =

American college football season

2024 Georgetown Hoyas football
- Conference: Patriot League
- Record: 5–6 (2–4 Patriot)
- Head coach: Rob Sgarlata (10th season)
- Offensive coordinator: Rob Spence (6th season)
- Defensive coordinator: Kevin Doherty (7th season)
- Home stadium: Cooper Field

2024 Patriot League football standings
	Conf.			Overall
Team	W		L	W		L
No. 20 Lehigh +^	5	–	1	9	–	4
Holy Cross +	5	–	1	6	–	6
Bucknell	4	–	2	6	–	6
Lafayette	2	–	4	6	–	6
Georgetown	2	–	4	5	–	6
Fordham	2	–	4	2	–	10
Colgate	1	–	5	2	–	10
+ – Conference co-champions; ^ – FCS playoff participant; Rankings from STATS Poll

The 2024 Georgetown Hoyas football team represented Georgetown University as a member of the Patriot League during the 2024 NCAA Division I FCS football season. Being led by tenth-year head coach Rob Sgarlata, the Hoyas played their home games at Cooper Field in Washington, D.C..

== Schedule ==
Date	Time	Opponent	Site	TV	Result	Attendance
August 31	12:30 p.m.	Davidson*	Cooper Field; Washington, DC	ESPN+	W 46–24	3,975
September 7	12:00 p.m.	at Marist*	Leonidoff Field; Poughkeepsie, NY	ESPN+	W 31–10	2,677
September 14	1:00 p.m.	at Sacred Heart*	Campus Field; Fairfield, CT	ESPN+	L 14–40	4,869
September 21	1:00 p.m.	Brown*^{†}	Cooper Field; Washington, DC	ESPN+	L 14–26	2,135
September 28	12:30 p.m.	Columbia*	Cooper Field; Washington, DC	ESPN+	W 20–17	3,359
October 12	12:30 p.m.	at Lafayette	Fisher Stadium; Easton, PA	ESPN+	W 17–0	3,295
October 19	1:00 p.m.	at Colgate	Andy Kerr Stadium; Hamilton, NY	ESPN+	L 28–38	4,059
October 26	2:00 p.m.	Bucknell	Cooper Field; Washington, DC	ESPN+	W 21–20	3,579
November 2	12:30 p.m.	Lehigh	Cooper Field; Washington, DC	ESPN+	L 6–43	3,799
November 16	1:00 p.m.	at Fordham	Coffey Field; Bronx, NY	ESPN+	L 3–31	1,117
November 23	12:30 p.m.	Holy Cross	Cooper Field; Washington, DC	ESPN+	L 0–34	3,575
*Non-conference game; ^{†}Homecoming; All times are in Eastern time

== Game summaries ==
=== Davidson ===
Game One – Davidson Wildcats (0–0) at Georgetown Hoyas (0–0) – Game summary

Quarter	1	2	3	4	Total
Wildcats	3	14	0	7	24
Hoyas	12	10	21	3	46

at Cooper Field • Washington, DC

- Date: Saturday August 31, 2024
- Game time: 12:30 p.m.
- Game weather: 0 °F (−18 °C)
- Game attendance: 3,975
- TV: ESPN+
- Box Score

Game information

First quarter

- GTWN – Cooper Blomstrom Safety, 13:31. Hoyas 2–0. Drive: 3 plays, -12 yards, 1:29.
- GTWN – Patrick Ryan 33 Yd Field Goal, 10:06. Hoyas 5–0. Drive: 7 plays, 32 yards, 3:25.
- DAV – Adam Zouagui 48 Yd Field Goal, 6:32. Hoyas 5–3. Drive: 6 plays, 31 yards, 3:27.
- GTWN – Naieem Kearney 23 Yd Run (Patrick Ryan Kick), 0:26. Hoyas 12–3. Drive: 5 plays, 66 yards, 2:43.

Second quarter

- DAV – Mason Sheron 3 Yd Run (Adam Zouagui Kick), 12:37. Hoyas 12–10. Drive: 5 plays, 45 yards, 2:39.
- GTWN – Bryce Cox 59 Yd Run (Patrick Ryan Kick), 11:23. Hoyas 19–10. Drive: 3 plays, 75 yards, 1:14.
- DAV – Mari Adams 11 Yd Run (Adam Zouagui Kick), 8:02. Hoyas 19–17. Drive: 7 plays, 76 yards, 3:15.
- GTWN – Patrick Ryan 27 Yd Field Goal, 3:41. Hoyas 22–17. Drive: 10 plays, 65 yards, 4:21.

Third quarter

- GTWN – Naieem Kearney 20 Yd Run (Patrick Ryan Kick), 14:42. Hoyas 29–17. Drive: 1 play, 20 yards, 0:05.
- GTWN – Quincy Briggs 64 Yd Fumble Return (Patrick Ryan Kick), 9:13. Hoyas 36–17. Drive: 9 plays, 39 yards, 5:25.
- GTWN – Bryce Cox 23 Yd Run (Patrick Ryan Kick), 0:23. Hoyas 43–17. Drive: 4 plays, 68 yards, 2:04.

Fourth quarter

- GTWN – Patrick Ryan 25 Yd Field Goal, 8:38. Hoyas 46–17. Drive: 8 plays, 46 yards, 3:49.
- DAV – Andrew Frazier 7 Yd Run (Adam Zouagui Kick), 1:55. Hoyas 46–17. Drive: 13 plays, 58 yards, 6:30.

Statistics	DAV	GTWN
First downs	22	20
Total yards	345	369
Rushing yards	224	263
Passing yards	121	106
Passing: Comp–Att–Int	11–18–1	9–17–0
Time of possession	38:56	21:04

Team	Category	Player	Statistics
Davidson	Passing	Coulter Cleland	8/11, 98 yards, 1 INT
Davidson	Rushing	Mari Adams	13 carries, 48 yards, 1 TD
Davidson	Receiving	Kellyn West	1 receptions, 42 yards
Georgetown	Passing	Danny Lauter	9/16, 106 yards
Georgetown	Rushing	Naieem Kearney	5 carries, 87 yards, 2 TD
Georgetown	Receiving	Jimmy Kibble	4 receptions, 60 yards

=== at Marist ===
Game Two – Georgetown Hoyas (1–0) vs Marist Red Foxes (0–0) – Game summary

Quarter	1	2	3	4	Total
Hoyas	0	7	10	14	31
Red Foxes	7	3	0	0	10

at Leonidoff Field, Poughkeepsie, New York

- Date: Saturday September 7, 2024
- Game time: 12:00 PM
- Game attendance: 2,677
- TV: ESPN+
- box score

Game information

First quarter

- MRST – Carter James 2 Yd Run (Connor Mendini Kick), 9:45. Red Foxes 7–0. Drive: 14 plays, 78 yards, 5:07.

Second quarter

- GTWN – Naieem Kearney 2 Yd Run (Patrick Ryan Kick), 14:08. Tied 7–7. Drive: 11 plays, 65 yards, 5:11.
- MRST – Connor Mendini 25 Yd Field Goal, 1:50. Red Foxes 10–7. Drive: 12 plays, 46 yards, 4:07.

Third quarter

- GTWN – Patrick Ryan 38 Yd Field Goal, 12:26. Tied 10–10. Drive: 5 plays, 23 yards, 2:25.
- GTWN – Naieem Kearney 3 Yd Run (Patrick Ryan Kick), 2:35. Hoyas 17–10. Drive: 6 plays, 52 yards, 3:25.

Fourth quarter

- GTWN – Isaiah Grimes 12 Yd pass from Danny Lauter (Patrick Ryan Kick), 11:19. Hoyas 24–10. Drive: 8 plays, 68 yards, 4:44.
- GTWN – Mason Gudger 17 Yd Run (Patrick Ryan Kick), 1:48. Hoyas 31–10. Drive: 13 plays, 80 yards, 7:31.

Statistics	GTWN	MRST
First downs	20	14
Total yards	319	210
Rushing yards	120	63
Passing yards	199	147
Passing: Comp–Att–Int	21−27−0	17−30−0
Time of possession	34:04	25:56

Team	Category	Player	Statistics
Georgetown	Passing	Danny Lauter	21/27, 199 yards, 1 TD
Georgetown	Rushing	Mason Gudger	8 carries, 51 yards, 1 TD
Georgetown	Receiving	Nicholas Dunneman	7 receptions, 70 yards
Marist	Passing	Enzo Arjona	17/30, 147 yards
Marist	Rushing	Carter James	12 carries, 47 yards, 1 TD
Marist	Receiving	Jackson Conners-McCarthy	8 receptions, 75 yards

=== at Sacred Heart ===
Game Three – Georgetown Hoyas (2–0) vs Sacred Heart Pioneers (1–1) – Game summary

Quarter	1	2	3	4	Total
Hoyas	7	7	0	0	14
Pioneers	13	10	7	10	40

at Campus Field, Fairfield, Connecticut

- Date: Saturday September 14, 2024
- Game time: 1:00 PM
- Game attendance: 4,869
- TV: ESPN+

Game information

First quarter

- SHU – John Michalski 9 Yd Run (Matt Kling PAT failed), 11:28. Pioneers 6–0. Drive: 6 plays, 37 yards, 2:19.
- GTWN – Naieem Kearney 1 Yd Run (Patrick Ryan Kick), 7:35. Hoyas 7–6. Drive: 9 plays, 70 yards, 3:53.
- SHU – Logan Lyson 6 Yd pass from John Michalski (Matt Kling Kick), 3:55. Pioneers 13–7. Drive: 8 plays, 63 yards, 3:33.

Second quarter

- GTWN – Jimmy Kibble 6 Yd pass from Danny Lauter (Patrick Ryan Kick), 14:55. Hoyas 14–13. Drive: 9 plays, 56 yards, 3:54.
- SHU – Ethan Hilliman 7 Yd pass from John Michalski (Matt Kling Kick), 0:32. Pioneers 20–14. Drive: 4 plays, 67 yards, 0:39.
- SHU – Matt Kling 21 Yd Field Goal, 0:00. Pioneers 23–14. Drive: 3 plays, 21 yards, 0:15.

Third quarter

- SHU – Xavier Leigh 37 Yd Run (Matt Kling Kick), 7:39. Pioneers 30–14. Drive: 8 plays, 80 yards, 3:57.

Fourth quarter

- SHU – Matt Kling 28 Yd Field Goal, 11:33. Pioneers 33–14. Drive: 5 plays, 42 yards, 2:09.
- SHU – Jalen Madison 2 Yd Run (Matt Kling Kick), 8:38. Pioneers 40–14. Drive: 2 plays, 81 yards, 0:32.

Statistics	GTWN	SHU
First downs	17	19
Total yards	352	473
Rushing yards	139	264
Passing yards	213	209
Passing: Comp–Att–Int	24−40−2	16−25−0
Time of possession	29:42	30:18

Team	Category	Player	Statistics
Georgetown	Passing	Danny Lauter	21/34, 190 yards, 1 TD, 2 INTs
Georgetown	Rushing	Naieem Kearney	17 carries, 98 yards, 1 TD
Georgetown	Receiving	Cam Pygatt	4 receptions, 74 yards
Sacred Heart	Passing	John Michalski	16/25, 209 yards, 2 TDs
Sacred Heart	Rushing	Xavier Leigh	12 carries, 112 yards, 1 TD
Sacred Heart	Receiving	Ethan Hilliman	4 receptions, 71 yards, 1 TD

=== Brown ===
Game Four – Brown Bears (0–0) at Georgetown Hoyas (2–1) – Game summary

Quarter	1	2	3	4	Total
Bears	14	6	6	0	26
Hoyas	7	7	0	0	14

at Cooper Field • Washington, DC

- Date: September 21, 2024
- Game time: 1:00 p.m.
- Game weather: Sunny, 83 °F (28 °C)
- Game attendance: 2,135
- Referee: Alex Parrella
- TV announcers (ESPN+): Jeremy Huber (play-by-play) and Colleen McNamara (analyst)

Game information

First quarter

- BRWN – Solomon Miller 87-yard pass from Jake Wilcox (Christopher Maron kick), 12:30. Bears 7–0. Drive: 1 play, 87 yards, 0:12.
- GTWN – Naieem Kearney 1-yard run (Patrick Ryan kick), 8:36. Tied 7–7. Drive: 8 plays, 75 yards, 3:54.
- BRWN – Mark Mahoney 45-yard pass from Jake Wilcox (Christopher Maron kick), 6:17. Bears 14–7. Drive: 5 plays, 69 yards, 2:11.

Second quarter

- BRWN – Christopher Maron 24-yard field goal, 6:19. Bears 17–7. Drive: 7 plays, 37 yards, 2:31.
- GTWN – Cam Pygatt 77-yard pass from Danny Lauter (Patrick Ryan kick), 5:02. Bears 17–14. Drive: 3 plays, 83 yards, 1:13.
- BRWN – Christopher Maron 33-yard field goal, 0:00. Bears 20–14. Drive: 16 plays, 60 yards, 5:02.

Third quarter

- BRWN – Jordan DeLucia 1-yard run (pass failed), 1:14. Bears 26–14. Drive: 9 plays, 61 yards, 4:06.

Fourth quarter

No scoring plays

Statistics	BRWN	GTWN
First downs	21	18
Total yards	372	402
Rushing yards	104	59
Passing yards	268	343
Passing: Comp–Att–Int	17–34–1	27–47–2
Time of possession	31:34	28:26

Team	Category	Player	Statistics
Brown	Passing	Jake Wilcox	17/33, 268 yards, 2 TD, INT
Brown	Rushing	Jordan DeLucia	12 carries, 50 yards, TD
Brown	Receiving	Solomon Miller	3 receptions, 99 yards, TD
Georgetown	Passing	Danny Lauter	27/47, 343 yards, TD, 2 INT
Georgetown	Rushing	Naieem Kearney	11 carries, 52 yards, TD
Georgetown	Receiving	Cam Pygatt	6 receptions, 116 yards, TD

=== Columbia ===
Game Five – Columbia Lions (1–0) at Georgetown Hoyas (2–2) – Game summary

Quarter	1	2	3	4	Total
Lions	7	7	0	3	17
Hoyas	0	7	6	7	20

at Cooper Field • Washington, DC

- Date: September 28, 2024
- Game time: 12:30 p.m.
- Game weather: 0 °F (−18 °C)
- Game attendance: 3,359
- TV: ESPN+

Game information

First quarter

- COLU – Bryson Canty 1 Yd pass from Cole Freeman (Hugo Merry Kick), 4:34. Lions 7–0. Drive: 8 plays, 67 yards, 3:22.

Second quarter

- COLU – Edan Stagg 43 Yd pass from Cole Freeman (Hugo Merry Kick), 8:40. Lions 14–0. Drive: 11 plays, 98 yards, 6:10.
- GTWN – Bryce Cox 4 Yd Run (Patrick Ryan Kick), 4:02. Lions 14–7. Drive: 8 plays, 76 yards, 4:32.

Third quarter

- GTWN – Nicholas Dunneman 32 Yd pass from Danny Lauter (Patrick Ryan PAT failed), 0:01. Lions 14–13. Drive: 6 plays, 76 yards, 2:27.

Fourth quarter

- COLU – Hugo Merry 23 Yd Field Goal, 5:05. Lions 17–13. Drive: 16 plays, 82 yards, 9:55.
- GTWN – Nicholas Dunneman 16 Yd pass from Danny Lauter (Patrick Ryan Kick), 1:10. Hoyas 20–14. Drive: 8 plays, 73 yards, 3:46.

Statistics	COLU	GTWN
First downs	21	17
Total yards	378	345
Rushing yards	167	53
Passing yards	211	292
Passing: Comp–Att–Int	15−30−3	25−33−0
Time of possession	31:40	28:20

Team	Category	Player	Statistics
Columbia	Passing	Cole Freeman	15/30, 211 yards, 2 TDs, 3 INTs
Columbia	Rushing	Malcolm Terry II	12 carries, 59 yards
Columbia	Receiving	Edan Stagg	3 receptions, 62 yards, 1 TD
Georgetown	Passing	Danny Lauter	25/33, 292 yards, 2 TDs
Georgetown	Rushing	Bryce Cox	11 carries, 36 yards, 1 TD
Georgetown	Receiving	Jimmy Kibble	10 receptions, 164 yards

=== at Lafayette ===
Game Six – Georgetown Hoyas (3–2) at Lafayette Leopards (3–2) – Game summary

Quarter	1	2	3	4	Total
Hoyas	3	7	7	0	17
Leopards	0	0	0	0	0

at Fisher Stadium • Easton, Pennsylvania

- Date: Saturday October 12, 2024
- Game time: 12:30 PM
- Game weather: Sunny • Temperature: 70 °F (21 °C) • Wind: NW 11 mph
- Game attendance: 3,295
- Referee: Todd Boyd
- TV: ESPN+

Game information

First quarter

- GTWN – Patrick Ryan 26 Yd Field Goal, 4:26. Hoyas 3–0. Drive: 12 plays, 51 yards, 5:29.

Second quarter

- GTWN – Savion Hart 1 Yd Run (Patrick Ryan Kick), 1:02. Hoyas 10–0. Drive: 14 plays, 66 yards, 7:17.

Third quarter

- GTWN – Udechukwu Enyerlbe 24 Yd Run (Patrick Ryan Kick), 7:45. Hoyas 17–0. Drive: 1 play, 24 yards, 0:06.

Fourth quarter

No scoring plays

Statistics	GTWN	LAF
First downs	17	13
Total yards	289	236
Rushing yards	189	69
Passing yards	100	167
Passing: Comp–Att–Int	12−25−1	10−38−4
Time of possession	39:18	20:42

Team	Category	Player	Statistics
Georgetown	Passing	Danny Lauter	12/25, 100 yards, 1 INT
Georgetown	Rushing	Bryce Cox	19 carries, 74 yards
Georgetown	Receiving	Jimmy Kibble	3 receptions, 42 yards
Lafayette	Passing	Dean DeNobile	10/38, 167 yards, 4 INTs
Lafayette	Rushing	Jamar Curtis	14 carries, 53 yards
Lafayette	Receiving	Elijah Steward	4 receptions, 79 yards

=== at Colgate ===
Game Seven – Georgetown Hoyas (4–2) at Colgate Raiders (1–5) – Game summary

Quarter	1	2	3	4	Total
Hoyas	7	7	7	7	28
Raiders	14	0	14	10	38

at Andy Kerr Stadium • Hamilton, New York

- Date: Saturday October 19, 2024
- Game time: 1:00 p.m.
- Game weather: 0 °F (−18 °C)
- Game attendance: 4,059
- TV: ESPN+

Game information

First quarter

- GTWN – Jimmy Kibble 18 Yd pass from Danny Lauter (Patrick Ryan Kick), 10:28. Hoyas 7–0. Drive: 11 plays, 75 yards, 4:32.
- COLG – Brendan Cassamajor 1 Yd Run (Luke Vogeler Kick), 6:34. Tied 7–7. Drive: 9 plays, 65 yards, 3:47.
- COLG – Brady Hutchison 25 Yd pass from Jake Stearney (Luke Vogeler Kick), 1:19. Raiders 14–7. Drive: 3 plays, 69 yards, 1:14.

Second quarter

- GTWN – Cam Pygatt 5 Yd pass from Danny Lauter (Patrick Ryan Kick), 3:31. Tied 14–14. Drive: 13 plays, 99 yards, 6:40.

Third quarter

- COLG – Aleks Sitkowski 21 Yd Run (Luke Vogeler Kick), 12:32. Raiders 21–14. Drive: 5 plays, 72 yards, 2:24.
- COLG – Marco Maldonado 25 Yd Run (Luke Vogeler Kick), 3:59. Raiders 28–14. Drive: 14 plays, 72 yards, 6:39.
- GTWN – Nicholas Dunneman 10 Yd pass from Danny Lauter (Patrick Ryan Kick), 3:55. Raiders 28–21. Drive: 9 plays, 84 yards, 3:55.

Fourth quarter

- COLG – Chris Gee 21 Yd Run (Luke Vogeler Kick), 10:29. Raiders 35–21. Drive: 9 plays, 60 yards, 4:24.
- GTWN – Jimmy Kibble 52 Yd pass from Danny Lauter (Patrick Ryan Kick), 9:22. Raiders 35–28. Drive: 3 plays, 75 yards, 1:07.
- COLG – Luke Vogeler 42 Yd Field Goal, 6:02. Raiders 38–28. Drive: 7 plays, 51 yards, 3:20.

Statistics	GTWN	COLG
First downs	26	24
Total yards	415	467
Rushing yards	143	272
Passing yards	272	195
Passing: Comp–Att–Int	22−36−2	14−23−0
Time of possession	29:38	30:22

Team	Category	Player	Statistics
Georgetown	Passing	Danny Lauter	22/36, 272 yards, 4 TDs, 2 INTs
Georgetown	Rushing	Savion Hart	8 carries, 84 yards
Georgetown	Receiving	Jimmy Kibble	5 receptions, 128 yards, 2 TDs
Colgate	Passing	Jake Stearney	14/23, 195 yards, 1 TD
Colgate	Rushing	Marco Maldonado	14 carries, 112 yards, 1 TD
Colgate	Receiving	Treyvhon Saunders	7 receptions, 68 yards

=== Bucknell ===
Game Eight – Bucknell Bison (3–4) at Georgetown Hoyas (4–3) – Game summary

Quarter	1	2	3	4	Total
Bison	7	10	0	3	20
Hoyas	0	14	7	0	21

at Cooper Field • Washington, D.C.

- Date: Saturday October 26, 2024
- Game time: 2:00 p.m. EST
- Game attendance: 3,579
- TV announcers (ESPN+): TBD

Game information

First quarter

- BUCK – Tariq Thomas 15 Yd Run (Matt Schearer Kick), 12:03. Bison 7–0. Drive: 7 plays, 75 yards, 2:57.

Second quarter

- BUCK – Tariq Thomas 27 Yd Run (Matt Schearer Kick), 14:46. Bison 14–0. Drive: 5 plays, 58 yards, 1:39.
- GTWN – Savion Hart 40 Yd Run (Patrick Ryan Kick), 4:29. Bison 14–7. Drive: 4 plays, 70 yards, 2:01.
- GTWN – Nicholas Dunneman 11 Yd pass from Danny Lauter (Patrick Ryan Kick), 0:14. Tied 14–14. Drive: 10 plays, 76 yards, 2:10.
- BUCK – Matt Schearer 43 Yd Field Goal, 00:00. Bison 17–14. Drive: 3 plays, 39 yards, 0:14.

Third quarter

- GTWN – Bryce Cox 1 Yd Run (Patrick Ryan Kick), 5:56. Hoyas 21–17. Drive: 12 plays, 81 yards, 6:53.

Fourth quarter

- BUCK – Matt Schearer 32 Yd Field Goal, 9:14. Hoyas 21–20. Drive: 9 plays, 65 yards, 3:25.

Statistics	BUCK	GTWN
First downs	19	24
Total yards	368	404
Rushing yards	142	274
Passing yards	226	130
Passing: Comp–Att–Int	17−29−0	13−24−1
Time of possession	22:40	37:20

Team	Category	Player	Statistics
Bucknell	Passing	Ralph Rucker IV	17/29, 226 yards
Bucknell	Rushing	Tariq Thomas	25 carries, 145 yards, 2 TDs
Bucknell	Receiving	Josh Gary	5 receptions, 91 yards
Georgetown	Passing	Danny Lauter	13/23, 130 yards, 1 TD, 1 INT
Georgetown	Rushing	Savion Hart	17 carries, 112 yards, 1 TD
Georgetown	Receiving	Jimmy Kibble	4 receptions, 64 yards

=== Lehigh ===
Game Nine – Lehigh Mountain Hawks (4–3) at Georgetown Hoyas (5–3) – Game summary

Quarter	1	2	3	4	Total
Mountain Hawks	0	24	12	7	43
Hoyas	0	0	0	6	6

at Cooper Field • Washington, D.C.

- Date: Saturday November 2, 2024
- Game time: 12:30 p.m. EST
- Game attendance: 3,799
- TV announcers (ESPN+): TBD

Game information

First quarter

No scoring plays

Second quarter

- (13:37) LEH - Hayden Johnson 1 yard run, Nick Garrido kick (Drive: 1 play, 1 yard, 0:07 Lehigh 7-0)
- (10:40) LEH - Jaden Green 24 yard run, Nick Garrido kick (Drive: 3 plays, 58 yards, 1:16 Lehigh 14-0)
- (7:20) LEH - Jaden Green 57 yard run, Nick Garrido kick (Drive: 3 plays, 73 yards, 1:28 Lehigh 21-0)
- (0:21) LEH - Nick Garrido 29 yard field goal (Drive: 8 plays, 68 yards, 2:49 Lehigh 24-0)

Third quarter

- (11:05) LEH - Jordan Adderley 55 yard interception return, Nick Garrido kick (Drive: 5 plays, 25 yards, 2:10 Lehigh 31-0)
- (6:25) LEH - Nick Garrido 30 yard field goal (Drive: 7 plays, 55 yards, 4:17 Lehigh 34-0)
- (2:59) LEH - Team Saftey (Lehigh 36-0)

Fourth quarter

- (6:34) GTWN - Max McCormick 5 yard pass from Danny Lauter, two-point conversion failed (Drive: 13 plays, 90 yards, 5:46 Lehigh 36-6)
- (4:18) LEH - Connor Hilling 20 yard run, Canaan Kimball kick (Drive: 4 plays, 47 yards, 2:14 Lehigh 43-6)

Statistics	LEH	GTWN
First downs	15	15
Total yards	385	262
Rushing yards	310	73
Passing yards	75	189
Passing: Comp–Att–Int	5-14-1	22-38-3
Time of possession	28:54	31:06

Team	Category	Player	Statistics
Lehigh	Passing	Hayden Johnson	4/8, 75 yards
Lehigh	Rushing	Jaden Green	8 carries, 88 yards, 2 TD
Lehigh	Receiving	Mason Humphrey	1 reception, 31 yards
Georgetown	Passing	Danny Lauter	22/37, 1 TD, 1 INT
Georgetown	Rushing	Bryce Cox	11 carries, 77 yards
Georgetown	Receiving	Jimmy Kibble	5 receptions, 47 yards

=== at Fordham ===
Game Ten – Georgetown Hoyas (5–4) at Fordham Rams (1–9) – Game summary

Quarter	1	2	3	4	Total
Hoyas	0	3	0	0	3
Rams	14	3	7	7	31

at Coffey Field • Bronx, New York

- Date: Saturday November 16, 2024
- Game time: 1:00 PM
- Game weather: 0 °F (−18 °C)
- Game attendance: 1,117
- TV: ESPN+

Game information

First quarter

- FOR – Julius Loughridge 2 Yd Run (Bennett Henderson Kick), 8:21. Rams 7–0
- FOR – Jeff Ciccio 5 Yd pass from Jack Capaldi (Bennett Henderson Kick), 0:08. Rams 14–0

Second quarter

- FOR – Bennett Henderson 28 Yd Field Goal, 12:09. Rams 17–0
- GTWN – Patrick Ryan 18 Yd Field Goal, 5:22. Rams 17–3

Third quarter

- FOR – KJ Reed 12 Yd pass from Jack Capaldi (Bennett Henderson Kick), 00:02. Rams 24–3

Fourth quarter

- FOR – Alex Kemper 63 Yd Interception Return (Bennett Henderson Kick), 07:24. Rams 31–3

Statistics	GTWN	FOR
First downs	18	19
Total yards	358	395
Rushing yards	74	173
Passing yards	284	222
Passing: Comp–Att–Int	22−41−2	12−25−1
Time of possession	32:20	27:40

Team	Category	Player	Statistics
Georgetown	Passing	Jacob Holtschlag	19/34, 253 yards, 2 INTs
Georgetown	Rushing	Bryce Cox	9 carries, 47 yards
Georgetown	Receiving	Cam Pygatt	7 receptions, 135 yards
Fordham	Passing	Jack Capaldi	12/25, 222 yards, 2 TDs, 1 INT
Fordham	Rushing	Julius Loughridge	16 carries, 91 yards, 1 TD
Fordham	Receiving	Nodin Tracy	3 receptions, 97 yards

=== Holy Cross ===
Game Eleven – Holy Cross Crusaders (5–6) at Georgetown Hoyas (5–5) – Game summary

Quarter	1	2	3	4	Total
Crusaders	17	3	7	7	34
Hoyas	0	0	0	0	0

at Cooper Field • Washington, D.C.

- Date: Saturday November 23, 2024
- Game time: 12:30 p.m. EST
- Game attendance: 3,575
- TV announcers (ESPN+): TBD

Game information

First quarter

- HC – Daniel Porto 28 Yd Field Goal, 9:26. Crusaders 3–0, Drive: 7 plays, 35 yards, 3:38
- HC – Joe Townsend 10 Yd Punt Return (Daniel Porto Kick), 7:49. Crusaders 10–0, Drive: 3 plays, 4 yards, 1:29
- HC – Jayden Clerveaux 18 Yd Run (Daniel Porto Kick), 0:43. Crusaders 17–0, Drive: 7 plays, 76 yards, 3:56

Second quarter

- HC – Daniel Porto 48 Yd Field Goal, 12:13. Crusaders 20–0, Drive: 6 plays, 14 yards, 2:47

Third quarter

- HC – Jayden Clerveaux 3 Yd Run (Daniel Porto Kick), 7:24. Crusaders 27–0, Drive: 13 plays, 46 yards, 7:28

Fourth quarter

- HC – Byron Shipman 12 Yd pass from Joe Pesansky (Daniel Porto Kick), 9:00. Crusaders 34–0, Drive: 3 plays, 18 yards, 3:40

Statistics	HC	GTWN
First downs	15	12
Total yards	293	184
Rushing yards	193	99
Passing yards	100	85
Passing: Comp–Att–Int	8−17−3	13−30−1
Time of possession	34:42	25:18

Team	Category	Player	Statistics
Holy Cross	Passing	Joe Pesansky	8/16, 100 yards, 1 TD, 2 INTs
Holy Cross	Rushing	Jayden Clerveaux	23 carries, 135 yards, 2 TDs
Holy Cross	Receiving	Nathan Schillinger	2 receptions, 34 yards
Georgetown	Passing	Jacob Holtschlag	13/30, 85 yards, 1 INT
Georgetown	Rushing	Bryce Cox	7 carries, 58 yards
Georgetown	Receiving	Cam Pygatt	1 reception, 21 yards
