= 2024 Colgate Raiders football team =

American college football season

2024 Colgate Raiders football
- Conference: Patriot League
- Record: 2–10 (1–5 Patriot)
- Head coach: Stan Dakosty (4th season)
- Offensive coordinator: Brent Bassham (5th season)
- Defensive coordinator: Jordan Belfiori (3rd season)
- Home stadium: Crown Field at Andy Kerr Stadium

2024 Patriot League football standings
	Conf.			Overall
Team	W		L	W		L
No. 20 Lehigh +^	5	–	1	9	–	4
Holy Cross +	5	–	1	6	–	6
Bucknell	4	–	2	6	–	6
Lafayette	2	–	4	6	–	6
Georgetown	2	–	4	5	–	6
Fordham	2	–	4	2	–	10
Colgate	1	–	5	2	–	10
+ – Conference co-champions; ^ – FCS playoff participant; Rankings from STATS Poll

The 2024 Colgate Raiders football team represented Colgate University as a member of the Patriot League during the 2024 NCAA Division I FCS football season. The Raiders were led by 4th-year head coach Stan Dakosty, and played their home games at Crown Field at Andy Kerr Stadium in Hamilton, New York.

== Schedule ==
Date	Time	Opponent	Site	TV	Result	Attendance
August 30	7:00 p.m.	at Maine*	Harold Alfond Sports Stadium; Orono, Maine	FloFootball	L 14–17	5,775
September 7	6:00 p.m.	No. 5 Villanova*	Crown Field at Andy Kerr Stadium; Hamilton, New York	ESPN+	L 3–28	2,619
September 14	6:00 p.m.	at Akron*	InfoCision Stadium; Akron, Ohio	ESPN+	L 20–31	8,932
September 21	1:00 p.m.	Cornell*^{†}	Crown Field at Andy Kerr Stadium; Hamilton, New York (rivalry)	ESPN+	W 41–24	2,984
September 28	1:00 p.m.	at Penn*	Franklin Field; Philadelphia, Pennsylvania	ESPN+	L 17–27	4,818
October 5	1:00 p.m.	Holy Cross	Crown Field at Andy Kerr Stadium; Hamilton, New York	ESPN+	L 7–38	821
October 19	1:00 p.m.	Georgetown	Crown Field at Andy Kerr Stadium; Hamilton, New York	ESPN+	W 38–28	4,059
October 26	1:00 p.m.	at Merrimack*	Duane Stadium; North Andover, Massachusetts	NESN+/ESPN+	L 17–51	2,163
November 2	1:00 p.m.	at Fordham	Coffey Field; Bronx, New York	ESPN+	L 14–20	N/A
November 9	1:00 p.m.	Lafayette	Crown Field at Andy Kerr Stadium; Hamilton, New York (Senior Day)	ESPN+	L 20–21	1,208
November 16	12:00 p.m.	at Lehigh	Goodman Stadium; Bethlehem, Pennsylvania	ESPN+	L 17–45	3,321
November 23	1:00 p.m.	at Bucknell	Christy Mathewson-Memorial Stadium; Lewisburg, Pennsylvania	ESPN+	L 34–48	762
*Non-conference game; ^{†}Homecoming; Rankings from STATS Poll released prior to the game; All times are in Eastern time

== Game summaries ==
=== at Maine ===
Colgate Raiders (0–0) at Maine Black Bears (0–0) – Game summary

Quarter	1	2	3	4	Total
Raiders	0	7	0	7	14
Black Bears	0	10	0	7	17

at Harold Alfond Sports Stadium • Orono, ME

- Date: August 30, 2024
- Game time: 7:00 p.m.
- Game weather: 0 °F (−18 °C)
- TV: FloFootball

Game information

First quarter
Second quarter
Third quarter
Fourth quarter

Statistics	COLG	ME
First downs		
Total yards		
Rushing yards		
Passing yards		
Passing: Comp–Att–Int		
Time of possession		

Team	Category	Player	Statistics
Colgate	Passing		
Colgate	Rushing		
Colgate	Receiving		
Maine	Passing		
Maine	Rushing		
Maine	Receiving		

=== No. 5 Villanova ===
No. 5 Villanova Wildcats (1–0) at Colgate Raiders (0–1) – Game summary

Quarter	1	2	3	4	Total
No. 5 Wildcats	0	0	0	0	0
Raiders	0	0	0	0	0

at Andy Kerr Stadium • Hamilton, NY

- Date: September 7, 2024
- Game time: 6:00 p.m.
- Game weather: 0 °F (−18 °C)
- TV: ESPN+

Game information

First quarter
Second quarter
Third quarter
Fourth quarter

Statistics	VILL	COLG
First downs		
Total yards		
Rushing yards		
Passing yards		
Passing: Comp–Att–Int		
Time of possession		

Team	Category	Player	Statistics
Villanova	Passing		
Villanova	Rushing		
Villanova	Receiving		
Colgate	Passing		
Colgate	Rushing		
Colgate	Receiving		

=== at Akron (FBS) ===
Colgate Raiders (0–2) at Akron Zips (FBS) (0–2) – Game summary

Quarter	1	2	3	4	Total
Raiders	0	0	0	0	0
Zips (FBS)	0	0	0	0	0

at InfoCision Stadium • Akron, OH

- Date: September 14, 2024
- Game time: 6:00 p.m.
- Game weather: 0 °F (−18 °C)
- TV announcers (ESPN+): Anthony Lima (play-by-play) and Ryan Cavanaugh (analyst)

Game information

First quarter
Second quarter
Third quarter
Fourth quarter

Statistics	COLG	AKR
First downs		
Total yards		
Rushing yards		
Passing yards		
Passing: Comp–Att–Int		
Time of possession		

Team	Category	Player	Statistics
Colgate	Passing		
Colgate	Rushing		
Colgate	Receiving		
Akron	Passing		
Akron	Rushing		
Akron	Receiving		

=== Cornell (rivalry) ===
Cornell Big Red (0–0) at Colgate Raiders (0–3) – Game summary

Quarter	1	2	3	4	Total
Big Red	10	7	0	7	24
Raiders	10	17	7	7	41

at Andy Kerr Stadium • Hamilton, NY

- Date: September 21, 2024
- Game time: 1:00 p.m.
- Game weather: Sunny • Temperature: 74 °F (23 °C) • Wind: S 6 mph
- Game attendance: 2,984
- Referee: Paul Matt Overton
- TV: ESPN+

Game information

First quarter

- (12:59) COR – Alan Zhao 32-yard field goal (Drive: 6 plays, 50 yards, 2:01; Cornell 3–0)
- (7:10) COL – Luke Vogeler 40-yard field goal (Drive: 13 plays, 42 yards, 5:49; Tied 3–3)
- (4:39) COR – Samuel Musungu 10-yard pass from Jameson Wang, Alan Zhao kick (Drive: 7 plays, 74 yards, 2:24; Cornell 10–3)
- (1:48) COL – Brady Hutchinson 27-yard pass from Jake Stearney, Luke Vogeler kick (Drive: 4 plays, 75 yards, 2:51; Tied 10–10)

Second quarter

- (14:35) COR – Parker Woodring 2-yard pass from Jameson Wang, Alan Zhao kick (Drive: 8 plays, 73 yards, 2:13; Cornell 17–10)
- (11:06) COL – Michael Brescia 44-yard run, Luke Vogeler kick (Drive: 7 plays, 65 yards, 3:29; Tied 17–17)
- (3:54) COL – Michael Brescia 1-yard run, Luke Vogeler kick (Drive: 9 plays, 58 yards, 5:12; Colgate 24–17)
- (0:00) COL – Luke Vogeler 22-yard field goal (Drive: 13 plays, 86 yards, 1:46; Colgate 27–17)

Third quarter

- (3:30) COL – Winston Moore 10-yard run, Luke Vogeler kick (Drive: 9 plays, 65 yards, 5:38; Colgate 34–17)

Fourth quarter

- (2:36) COR – Johntu Reed 1-yard pass from Jameson Wang, Alan Zhao kick (Drive: 10 plays, 72 yards, 2:31; Colgate 34–24)
- (1:06) COL – Marco Maldonado 6-yard run, Luke Vogeler kick (Drive: 6 plays, 40 yards, 1:29; Colgate 41–24)

Statistics	COR	COLG
First downs	19	26
Total yards	402	457
Rushing yards	89	270
Passing yards	313	187
Passing: Comp–Att–Int	29–37–0	18–29–1
Time of possession	25:33	34:27

Team	Category	Player	Statistics
Cornell	Passing	Jameson Wang	29/37, 313 yards, 3 TD
Cornell	Rushing	Jameson Wang	10 carries, 41 yards
Cornell	Receiving	Brendan Lee	5 receptions, 101 yards
Colgate	Passing	Jake Stearney	17/27, 184 yards, TD
Colgate	Rushing	Chris Gee	15 carries, 79 yards
Colgate	Receiving	Brady Hutchinson	6 receptions, 83 yards, TD

=== at Penn ===
Colgate Raiders (1–3) at Penn Quakers (0–1) – Game summary

Quarter	1	2	3	4	Total
Raiders	0	0	0	0	0
Quakers	0	0	0	0	0

at Franklin Field • Philadelphia, PA

- Date: September 28, 2024
- Game time: 1:00 p.m.
- Game weather: 0 °F (−18 °C)
- TV: ESPN+

Game information

First quarter
Second quarter
Third quarter
Fourth quarter

Statistics	COLG	PENN
First downs		
Total yards		
Rushing yards		
Passing yards		
Passing: Comp–Att–Int		
Time of possession		

Team	Category	Player	Statistics
Colgate	Passing		
Colgate	Rushing		
Colgate	Receiving		
Penn	Passing		
Penn	Rushing		
Penn	Receiving		

=== Holy Cross ===
Holy Cross Crusaders (1–4) at Colgate Raiders (1–4) – Game summary

Quarter	1	2	3	4	Total
Crusaders	0	0	0	0	0
Raiders	0	0	0	0	0

at Andy Kerr Stadium • Hamilton, NY

- Date: October 5, 2024
- Game weather: 0 °F (−18 °C)
- TV: ESPN+

Game information

First quarter
Second quarter
Third quarter
Fourth quarter

Statistics	HC	COLG
First downs		
Total yards		
Rushing yards		
Passing yards		
Passing: Comp–Att–Int		
Time of possession		

Team	Category	Player	Statistics
Holy Cross	Passing		
Holy Cross	Rushing		
Holy Cross	Receiving		
Colgate	Passing		
Colgate	Rushing		
Colgate	Receiving		

=== Georgetown ===
Georgetown Hoyas (4–2) at Colgate Raiders (1–5) – Game summary

Quarter	1	2	3	4	Total
Hoyas	7	7	7	7	28
Raiders	14	0	14	10	38

at Andy Kerr Stadium • Hamilton, NY

- Date: October 19, 2024
- Game time: 1:00 p.m.
- Game weather: 0 °F (−18 °C)
- TV: ESPN+

Game information

First quarter

- GTWN – Jimmy Kibble 18 Yd pass from Danny Lauter (Patrick Ryan Kick), 10:28. Hoyas 7–0. Drive: 11 plays, 75 yards, 4:32.
- COLG – Brendan Cassamajor 1 Yd Run (Luke Vogeler Kick), 6:34. Tied 7–7. Drive: 9 plays, 65 yards, 3:47.
- COLG – Brady Hutchison 25 Yd pass from Jake Stearney (Luke Vogeler Kick), 1:19. Raiders 14–7. Drive: 3 plays, 69 yards, 1:14.

Second quarter

- GTWN – Cam Pygatt 5 Yd pass from Danny Lauter (Patrick Ryan Kick), 3:31. Tied 14–14. Drive: 13 plays, 99 yards, 6:40.

Third quarter

- COLG – Aleks Sitkowski 21 Yd Run (Luke Vogeler Kick), 12:32. Raiders 21–14. Drive: 5 plays, 72 yards, 2:24.
- COLG – Marco Maldonado 25 Yd Run (Luke Vogeler Kick), 3:59. Raiders 28–14. Drive: 14 plays, 72 yards, 6:39.
- GTWN – Nicholas Dunneman 10 Yd pass from Danny Lauter (Patrick Ryan Kick), 3:55. Raiders 28–21. Drive: 9 plays, 84 yards, 3:55.

Fourth quarter

- COLG – Chris Gee 21 Yd Run (Luke Vogeler Kick), 10:29. Raiders 35–21. Drive: 9 plays, 60 yards, 4:24.
- GTWN – Jimmy Kibble 52 Yd pass from Danny Lauter (Patrick Ryan Kick), 9:22. Raiders 35–28. Drive: 3 plays, 75 yards, 1:07.
- COLG – Luke Vogeler 42 Yd Field Goal, 6:02. Raiders 38–28. Drive: 7 plays, 51 yards, 3:20.

Statistics	GTWN	COLG
First downs	26	24
Total yards	415	467
Rushing yards	143	272
Passing yards	272	195
Passing: Comp–Att–Int	22−36−2	14−23−0
Time of possession	29:38	30:22

Team	Category	Player	Statistics
Georgetown	Passing	Danny Lauter	22/36, 272 yards, 4 TDs, 2 INTs
Georgetown	Rushing	Savion Hart	8 carries, 84 yards
Georgetown	Receiving	Jimmy Kibble	5 receptions, 128 yards, 2 TDs
Colgate	Passing	Jake Stearney	14/23, 195 yards, 1 TD
Colgate	Rushing	Marco Maldonado	14 carries, 112 yards, 1 TD
Colgate	Receiving	Treyvhon Saunders	7 receptions, 68 yards

=== at Merrimack ===
Colgate Raiders (2–5) at Merrimack Warriors (3–4) – Game summary

Quarter	1	2	3	4	Total
Raiders	0	0	0	0	0
Warriors	0	0	0	0	0

at Duane Stadium • North Andover, MA

- Date: October 26, 2024
- Game time: 1:00 p.m.
- Game weather: 0 °F (−18 °C)
- TV: NESN+/ESPN+

Game information

First quarter
Second quarter
Third quarter
Fourth quarter

Statistics	COLG	MRMK
First downs		
Total yards		
Rushing yards		
Passing yards		
Passing: Comp–Att–Int		
Time of possession		

Team	Category	Player	Statistics
Colgate	Passing		
Colgate	Rushing		
Colgate	Receiving		
Merrimack	Passing		
Merrimack	Rushing		
Merrimack	Receiving		

=== at Fordham ===
Colgate Raiders (2–6) at Fordham Rams (0–8) – Game summary

Quarter	1	2	3	4	Total
Raiders	0	0	0	0	0
Rams	0	0	0	0	0

at Coffey Field • Bronx, NY

- Date: November 2, 2024
- Game time: 1:00 p.m.
- Game weather: 0 °F (−18 °C)
- TV: ESPN+

Game information

First quarter
Second quarter
Third quarter
Fourth quarter

Statistics	COLG	FOR
First downs		
Total yards		
Rushing yards		
Passing yards		
Passing: Comp–Att–Int		
Time of possession		

Team	Category	Player	Statistics
Colgate	Passing		
Colgate	Rushing		
Colgate	Receiving		
Fordham	Passing		
Fordham	Rushing		
Fordham	Receiving		

=== Lafayette ===
Lafayette Leopards (4–5) at Colgate Raiders (2–7) – Game summary

Quarter	1	2	3	4	Total
Leopards	0	0	0	0	0
Raiders	0	0	0	0	0

at Andy Kerr Stadium • Hamilton, NY

- Date: November 9, 2024
- Game time: 1:00 p.m.
- Game weather: 0 °F (−18 °C)
- TV: ESPN+

Game information

First quarter
Second quarter
Third quarter
Fourth quarter

Statistics	LAF	COLG
First downs		
Total yards		
Rushing yards		
Passing yards		
Passing: Comp–Att–Int		
Time of possession		

Team	Category	Player	Statistics
Lafayette	Passing		
Lafayette	Rushing		
Lafayette	Receiving		
Colgate	Passing		
Colgate	Rushing		
Colgate	Receiving		

=== at Lehigh ===
Colgate Raiders (2–8) at Lehigh Mountain Hawks (6–3) – Game summary

Quarter	1	2	3	4	Total
Raiders	0	0	0	0	0
Mountain Hawks	0	0	0	0	0

at Goodman Stadium • Bethlehem, PA

- Date: November 16, 2024
- Game time: 12:00 p.m.
- Game weather: 0 °F (−18 °C)
- TV: ESPN+

Game information

First quarter
Second quarter
Third quarter
Fourth quarter

Statistics	COLG	LEH
First downs		
Total yards		
Rushing yards		
Passing yards		
Passing: Comp–Att–Int		
Time of possession		

Team	Category	Player	Statistics
Colgate	Passing		
Colgate	Rushing		
Colgate	Receiving		
Lehigh	Passing		
Lehigh	Rushing		
Lehigh	Receiving		

=== at Bucknell ===
Colgate Raiders (2–9) at Bucknell Bison (5–6) – Game summary

Quarter	1	2	3	4	Total
Raiders	0	0	0	0	0
Bison	0	0	0	0	0

at Christy Mathewson-Memorial Stadium • Lewisburg, PA

- Date: November 23, 2024
- Game time: 1:00 p.m.
- Game weather: 0 °F (−18 °C)
- TV: ESPN+

Game information

First quarter
Second quarter
Third quarter
Fourth quarter

Statistics	COLG	BUCK
First downs		
Total yards		
Rushing yards		
Passing yards		
Passing: Comp–Att–Int		
Time of possession		

Team	Category	Player	Statistics
Colgate	Passing		
Colgate	Rushing		
Colgate	Receiving		
Bucknell	Passing		
Bucknell	Rushing		
Bucknell	Receiving		
