= 2024 Butler Bulldogs football team =

American college football season

2024 Butler Bulldogs football
- Conference: Pioneer Football League
- Record: 9–3 (5–3 PFL)
- Head coach: Mike Uremovich (3rd season)
- Offensive coordinator: Alex Barr (2nd season)
- Defensive coordinator: Jeff Knowles (3rd season)
- Home stadium: Bud and Jackie Sellick Bowl

2024 Pioneer Football League standings
	Conf.			Overall
Team	W		L	W		L
Drake $^	7	–	1	8	–	3
San Diego	6	–	2	8	–	3
Butler	5	–	3	9	–	3
Morehead State	5	–	3	7	–	5
St. Thomas (MN)*	5	–	3	6	–	6
Dayton	4	–	4	6	–	5
Davidson	4	–	4	6	–	5
Presbyterian	4	–	4	6	–	6
Valparaiso	2	–	5	4	–	7
Marist	1	–	7	1	–	10
Stetson	0	–	7	2	–	9
$ – Conference champion; ^ – FCS playoff participant; * – St. Thomas (MN) ineligible for FCS postseason play due to transition from NCAA Division III; Rankings from STATS Poll

The 2024 Butler Bulldogs football team represented Butler University as a member of the Pioneer Football League (PFL) during the 2024 NCAA Division I FCS football season. They were led by third-year head coach Mike Uremovich and played home games at Bud and Jackie Sellick Bowl in Indianapolis.

== Schedule ==
Date	Time	Opponent	Site	TV	Result	Attendance
August 31	1:00 p.m.	Upper Iowa*	Bud and Jackie Sellick Bowl; Indianapolis, IN	FloFootball	W 40–7	3,109
September 7	7:00 p.m.	at Murray State*	Roy Stewart Stadium; Murray, KY	ESPN+	W 19–17	7,213
September 14	6:00 p.m.	Hanover*	Bud and Jackie Sellick Bowl; Indianapolis, IN	FloFootball	W 53–0	3,523
September 28	1:00 p.m.	Virginia–Lynchburg*	Bud and Jackie Sellick Bowl; Indianapolis, IN	FloFootball	W 63–0	3,222
October 5	1:00 p.m.	Morehead State^{†}	Bud and Jackie Sellick Bowl; Indianapolis, IN	FloFootball	W 40–6	4,516
October 12	2:00 p.m.	at Drake	Drake Stadium; Des Moines, IA	ESPN+	L 17–27	2,571
October 19	1:00 p.m.	Dayton	Bud and Jackie Sellick Bowl; Indianapolis, IN	FloFootball	L 14–21	2,578
October 26	1:00 p.m.	at Davidson	Richardson Stadium; Davidson, NC	ESPN+	W 48–38	2,979
November 2	1:00 p.m.	Stetson	Bud and Jackie Sellick Bowl; Indianapolis, IN	FloFootball	W 46–13	2,518
November 9	2:00 p.m.	at Valparaiso	Brown Field; Valparaiso, IN (Hoosier Helmet Trophy)	ESPN+	W 24–17	1,783
November 16	1:00 p.m.	St. Thomas (MN)	Bud and Jackie Sellick Bowl; Indianapolis, IN	FloFootball	W 36–20	2,926
November 23	1:00 p.m.	at Presbyterian	Bailey Memorial Stadium; Clinton, SC	ESPN+	L 27–30	4,000
*Non-conference game; ^{†}Homecoming; All times are in Eastern time

== Game summaries ==
=== Upper Iowa (DII) ===
Game One – Upper Iowa Peacocks (DII) (0–0) at Butler Bulldogs (0–0) – Game summary

Quarter	1	2	3	4	Total
Peacocks (DII)	0	7	0	0	7
Bulldogs	6	13	14	7	40

at Bud and Jackie Sellick Bowl • Indianapolis, Indiana

- Date: Saturday, August 31, 2024
- Game time: 1:00 p.m. EDT
- Game weather: Sunny • Temperature: 73 °F (23 °C) • Wind: NW at 2 miles per hour (3.2 km/h)
- Game attendance: 3,109
- Referee: Jason Berg
- TV: FloFootball

Game information

First quarter

- (7:48) BUT – Nick Howard 1-yard run (Drive: 3 plays, 8 yards, 1:29; Butler 6–0)

Second quarter

- (7:58) BUT – William Enneking 16-yard pass from Reagan Andrew, Ryan Short kick (Drive: 4 plays, 50 yards, 2:13; Butler 13–0)
- (1:03) UIU – Eddie Burgess 23-yard pass from Darryl Overstreet Jr., Henry Vakerics kick (Drive: 6 plays, 45 yards, 1:00; Butler 13–7)
- (0:09) BUT – Luke Wooten 70-yard pass from Reagan Andrew (Drive: 3 plays, 75 yards, 0:49; Butler 19–7)

Third quarter

- (10:57) BUT – Derek Allen Jr. 58-yard pass from Nick Howard, Sam Taglia kick (Drive: 2 plays, 65 yards, 0:47; Butler 26–7)
- (6:49) BUT – Reagan Andrew 22-yard run, Sam Taglia kick (Drive: 2 plays, 44 yards, 0:41; Butler 33–7)

Fourth quarter

- (12:54) BUT – Archie Cox 19-yard pass from Reagan Andrew, Sam Taglia kick (Drive: 6 plays, 86 yards, 3:30; Butler 40–7)

Statistics	UIU	BUT
First downs	15	13
Total yards	318	388
Rushing yards	197	146
Passing yards	121	242
Passing: Comp–Att–Int	12–31–3	14–22–2
Time of possession	36:32	23:28

Team	Category	Player	Statistics
Upper Iowa	Passing	Darryl Overstreet Jr.	12/31, 121 yards, TD, 3 INT
Upper Iowa	Rushing	Jayden Mitchell	16 carries, 85 yards
Upper Iowa	Receiving	Mante Morrow	3 receptions, 46 yards
Butler	Passing	Reagan Andrew	5/10, 119 yards, 3 TD, INT
Butler	Rushing	Nick Howard	5 carries, 54 yards, TD
Butler	Receiving	Luke Wooten	1 reception, 70 yards, TD

=== at Murray State ===
Game Two – Butler Bulldogs (1–0) at Murray State Racers (0–1) – Game summary

Quarter	1	2	3	4	Total
Bulldogs	3	7	0	9	19
Racers	0	7	7	3	17

at Roy Stewart Stadium • Murray, Kentucky

- Date: Saturday, September 7, 2024
- Game time: 7:00 p.m. EDT
- Game weather: Sunny • Temperature: 72 °F (22 °C) • Wind: NE at 12 miles per hour (19 km/h)
- Game attendance: 7,213
- Referee: Aaron Adams
- TV: ESPN+

Game information

First quarter

- (7:38) BUT – Ryan Short 22-yard field goal (Drive: 13 plays, 70 yards, 7:22; Butler 3–0)

Second quarter

- (10:21) MUR – Jawaun Northington 5-yard run, James London kick (Drive: 6 plays, 84 yards, 1:47; Murray State 7–3)
- (0:00) BUT – Nick Howard 1-yard run, Ryan Short kick (Drive: 11 plays, 91 yards, 2:01; Butler 10–7)

Third quarter

- (8:45) MUR – Kywon Morgan 4-yard run, James London kick (Drive: 3 plays, 67 yards, 1:08; Murray State 14–10)

Fourth quarter

- (9:08) BUT – Nick Howard 1-yard run (Drive: 9 plays, 82 yards, 4:21; Butler 16–14)
- (2:41) MUR – James London 51-yard field goal (Drive: 13 plays, 44 yards, 6:21; Murray State 17–16)
- (0:09) BUT – Ryan Short 22-yard field goal (Drive: 10 plays, 70 yards, 2:32; Butler 19–17)

Statistics	BUT	MUR
First downs	26	9
Total yards	436	239
Rushing yards	153	198
Passing yards	283	41
Passing: Comp–Att–Int	23–34–0	10–15–1
Time of possession	41:09	18:51

Team	Category	Player	Statistics
Butler	Passing	Reagan Andrew	18/25, 193 yards
Butler	Rushing	Nick Howard	20 carries, 85 yards, 2 TD
Butler	Receiving	William Enneking	4 receptions, 74 yards
Murray State	Passing	Jayden Johannsen	10/15, 41 yards, INT
Murray State	Rushing	Q'Daryius Jennings	4 carries, 53 yards
Murray State	Receiving	Justice Hill	2 receptions, 15 yards

=== Hanover (DIII) ===
Game Three – Hanover Panthers (DIII) (0–1) at Butler Bulldogs (2–0) – Game summary

Quarter	1	2	3	4	Total
Panthers (DIII)	0	0	0	0	0
Bulldogs	15	21	10	7	53

at Bud and Jackie Sellick Bowl • Indianapolis, Indiana

- Date: Saturday, September 14, 2024
- Game time: 6:00 p.m. EDT
- Game weather: Clear • Temperature: 88 °F (31 °C) • Wind: SE at 10 miles per hour (16 km/h)
- Game attendance: 3,523
- Referee: Rodney Smith
- TV: FloFootball

Game information

First quarter

- (13:00) BUT – Ethan Loss 47-yard pass from Nick Howard, Ryan Short kick (Drive: 2 plays, 57 yards, 0:27; Butler 7–0)
- (4:24) BUT – Nick Howard 30-yard run, Reagan Andrew run (Drive: 6 plays, 48 yards, 3:24; Butler 15–0)

Second quarter

- (11:00) BUT – Ethan Loss 9-yard pass from Reagan Andrew, Ryan Short kick (Drive: 11 plays, 48 yards, 5:46; Butler 22–0)
- (9:04) BUT – Joey Suchy 46-yard run, Ryan Short kick (Drive: 3 plays, 53 yards, 0:51; Butler 29–0)
- (0:07) BUT – Ethan Loss 7-yard pass from Nick Howard, Ryan Short kick (Drive: 11 plays, 81 yards, 2:11; Butler 36–0)

Third quarter

- (11:48) BUT – Ershod Jasey II 7-yard run, Ryan Short kick (Drive: 7 plays, 62 yards, 3:00; Butler 43–0)
- (5:48) BUT – Ryan Short 25-yard field goal (Drive: 6 plays, 25 yards, 2:33; Butler 46–0)

Fourth quarter

- (11:42) BUT – Griffin Caldwell 21-yard run, Ryan Short kick (Drive: 9 plays, 62 yards, 5:07; Butler 53–0)

Statistics	HAN	BUT
First downs	9	22
Total yards	133	492
Rushing yards	54	341
Passing yards	79	151
Passing: Comp–Att–Int	15–26–1	13–20–0
Time of possession	31:22	28:38

Team	Category	Player	Statistics
Hanover	Passing	Eian Roudebush	11/20, 47 yards
Hanover	Rushing	Eian Roudebush	8 carries, 15 yards
Hanover	Receiving	Eric Roudebush	3 receptions, 33 yards
Butler	Passing	Nick Howard	6/8, 91 yards, 2 TD
Butler	Rushing	Nick Howard	8 carries, 87 yards, TD
Butler	Receiving	Ethan Loss	4 receptions, 72 yards, 3 TD

=== VUL (NCCAA) ===
Game Four – VUL Dragons (NCCAA) (0–4) at Butler Bulldogs (3–0) – Game summary

Quarter	1	2	3	4	Total
Dragons (NCCAA)	0	0	0	0	0
Bulldogs	21	21	7	14	63

at Bud and Jackie Sellick Bowl • Indianapolis, Indiana

- Date: Saturday, September 28, 2024
- Game time: 1:00 p.m. EDT
- Game weather: Cloudy • Temperature: 70 °F (21 °C) • Wind: NE at 10 miles per hour (16 km/h)
- Game attendance: 3,222
- Referee: Tyler Downs
- TV: FloFootball

Game information

First quarter

- (12:06) BUT – Joey Suchy 7-yard run, Ryan Short kick (Drive: 3 plays, 32 yards, 1:26; Butler 7–0)
- (6:20) BUT – Billy Dozier 1-yard run, Ryan Short kick (Drive: 7 plays, 45 yards, 3:29; Butler 14–0)
- (0:36) BUT – Ethan Loss 51-yard pass from Reagan Andrew, Ryan Short kick (Drive: 6 plays, 85 yards, 2:16; Butler 21–0)

Second quarter

- (10:25) BUT – Nick Howard 3-yard run, Ryan Short kick (Drive: 6 plays, 48 yards, 3:04; Butler 28–0)
- (3:53) BUT – Trevon Brown 14-yard pass from Nick Howard, Ryan Short kick (Drive: 6 plays, 63 yards, 3:40; Butler 35–0)
- (0:51) BUT – Billy Dozier 3-yard run, Ryan Short kick (Drive: 6 plays, 57 yards, 1:51; Butler 42–0)

Third quarter

- (7:13) BUT – Joey Suchy 1-yard run, Beck Janki kick (Drive: 5 plays, 61 yards, 2:41; Butler 49–0)

Fourth quarter

- (8:57) BUT – Griffin Caldwell 1-yard run, Beck Janki kick (Drive: 11 plays, 50 yards, 11:06; Butler 56–0)
- (3:43) BUT – Jerel Rhoads II 2-yard run, Beck Janki kick (Drive: 8 plays, 52 yards, 4:25; Butler 63–0)

Statistics	VUL	BUT
First downs	3	29
Total yards	77	462
Rushing yards	0	349
Passing yards	77	113
Passing: Comp–Att–Int	9–17–0	7–10–0
Time of possession	19:00	41:00

Team	Category	Player	Statistics
VUL	Passing	Nico Cleaves	4/8, 40 yards
VUL	Rushing	Jacob Newman	11 carries, 19 yards
VUL	Receiving	Micah Gantt	2 receptions, 42 yards
Butler	Passing	Reagan Andrew	3/5, 79 yards, TD
Butler	Rushing	Joey Suchy	8 carries, 80 yards, 2 TD
Butler	Receiving	Ethan Loss	1 reception, 51 yards, TD

=== Morehead State ===
Game Five – Morehead State Eagles (3-2) at Butler Bulldogs (4–0) – Game summary

Quarter	1	2	3	4	Total
Eagles	0	0	0	6	6
Bulldogs	7	13	7	13	40

at Bud and Jackie Sellick Bowl • Indianapolis, Indiana

- Date: Saturday, October 5, 2024
- Game time: 1:00 p.m. EDT
- Game weather: Sunny • Temperature: 70 °F (21 °C) • Wind: SE at 8 miles per hour (13 km/h)
- Game attendance: 4,516
- Referee: David Hergert
- TV: FloFootball

Game information

First quarter

- (0:08) BUT – Reagan Andrew 3-yard run, Ryan Short kick (Drive: 10 plays, 70 yards, 5:09; Butler 7–0)

Second quarter

- (10:09) BUT – Billy Dozier 5-yard run, Ryan Short kick (Drive: 4 plays, 97 yards, 1:58; Butler 14–0)
- (0:24) BUT – William Enneking 14-yard pass from Reagan Andrew (Drive: 12 plays, 86 yards, 5:54; Butler 20–0)

Third quarter

- (4:06) BUT – Ershod Jasey II 25-yard pass from Reagan Andrew, Ryan Short kick (Drive: 6 plays, 63 yards, 3:22; Butler 27–0)

Fourth quarter

- (9:59) BUT – Trevon Brown 12-yard pass from Nick Howard (Drive: 7 plays, 95 yards, 3:20; Butler 33–0)
- (6:56) MORE – Ryan Upp 24-yard pass from Carter Cravens (Drive: 6 plays, 77 yards, 2:56; Butler 33–6)
- (1:41) BUT – Reagan Andrew 33-yard run, Ryan Short kick (Drive: 10 plays, 70 yards, 5:10; Butler 40–6)

Statistics	MORE	BUT
First downs	13	26
Total yards	258	482
Rushing yards	119	297
Passing yards	139	185
Passing: Comp–Att–Int	14–20–0	14–16–0
Time of possession	27:34	32:26

Team	Category	Player	Statistics
Morehead State	Passing	Carter Cravens	14/20, 139 yards, TD
Morehead State	Rushing	Isaac Stopke	12 carries, 67 yards
Morehead State	Receiving	Nate Garnett	4 receptions, 89 yards
Butler	Passing	Reagan Andrew	11/12, 172 yards, 2 TD
Butler	Rushing	Ershod Jasey II	11 carries, 76 yards
Butler	Receiving	Ethan Loss	1 reception, 71 yards

=== at Drake ===
Game Six – Butler Bulldogs (5–0) at Drake Bulldogs (3–1) – Game summary

Quarter	1	2	3	4	Total
Butler	0	6	3	8	17
Drake	0	3	10	14	27

at Drake Stadium • Des Moines, Iowa

- Date: Saturday October 12, 2024
- Game time: 2:00 p.m. EDT
- Game weather: Sunny • Temperature: 75 °F (24 °C) • Wind: N at 8 miles per hour (13 km/h)
- Game attendance: 2,571
- Referee: Jason Perkins
- TV announcers (ESPN+): Michael Admire (play-by-play)

Game information

First quarter

No scoring plays

Second quarter

- (12:08) DRKE – Shane Dunning 34-yard field goal (Drive: 14 plays, 46 yards, 5:57; Drake 3–0)
- (0:47) BUT – Reagan Andrew 4-yard run (Drive: 14 plays, 89 yards, 5:22; Butler 6–3)

Third quarter

- (8:55) DRKE – Shane Dunning 44-yard field goal (Drive: 11 plays, 48 yards, 6:05; Tied 6–6)
- (4:13) DRKE – Taj Hughes 38-yard pass from Luke Bailey, Shane Dunning kick (Drive: 6 plays, 73 yards, 3:36; Drake 13–6)
- (0:03) BUT – Ryan Short 39-yard field goal (Drive: 9 plays, 60 yards, 4:02; Drake 13–9)

Fourth quarter

- (9:48) DRKE – Blake Ellingson 1-yard run, Shane Dunning kick (Drive: 10 plays, 75 yards, 5:15; Drake 20–9)
- (8:44) DRKE – Davion Cherwin 32-yard run, Shane Dunning kick (Drive: 2 plays, 32 yards, 0:16; Drake 27–9)
- (4:54) BUT – Joey Suchy 2-yard run, Ethan Loss pass from Nick Howard (Drive: 11 plays, 75 yards, 3:50; Drake 27–17)

Statistics	BUT	DRKE
First downs	28	19
Total yards	333	314
Rushing yards	119	99
Passing yards	214	215
Passing: Comp–Att–Int	25–38–2	18–28–1
Time of possession	29:21	30:39

Team	Category	Player	Statistics
Butler	Passing	Reagan Andrew	22/32, 174 yards, 2 INT
Butler	Rushing	Reagan Andrew	18 carries, 81 yards, TD
Butler	Receiving	Ethan Loss	8 receptions, 86 yards
Drake	Passing	Luke Bailey	16/25, 213 yards, TD, INT
Drake	Rushing	Davion Cherwin	7 carries, 55 yards, TD
Drake	Receiving	Taj Hughes	7 receptions, 127 yards, TD

=== Dayton ===
Game Seven – Dayton Flyers (4–1) at Butler Bulldogs (5–1) – Game summary

Quarter	1	2	3	4	Total
Flyers	0	7	7	7	21
Bulldogs	0	3	3	8	14

at Bud and Jackie Sellick Bowl • Indianapolis, Indiana

- Date: Saturday October 19, 2024
- Game time: 1:00 p.m. EDT
- Game weather: Sunny • Temperature: 60 °F (16 °C) • Wind: SE at 2 miles per hour (3.2 km/h)
- Game attendance: 2,578
- Referee: John Shay
- TV: FloFootball

Game information

First quarter

No scoring plays

Second quarter

- (5:01) DAY – Jake Coleman 8-yard pass from Drew VanVleet, Danny Baker kick (Drive: 3 plays, 10 yards, 0:51; Dayton 7–0)
- (0:00) BUT – Ryan Short 32-yard field goal (Drive: 12 plays, 60 yards, 4:57; Dayton 7–3)

Third quarter

- (4:36) DAY – Luke Brenner 22-yard pass from Drew VanVleet, Danny Baker kick (Drive: 10 plays, 57 yards, 5:29; Dayton 14–3)
- (0:37) BUT – Ryan Short 37-yard field goal (Drive: 7 plays, 56 yards, 3:59; Dayton 14–6)

Fourth quarter

- (5:38) BUT – Reagan Andrew 8-yard run, Nick Howard run (Drive: 12 plays, 81 yards, 6:28; Tied 14–14)
- (0:11) DAY – Luke Brenner 33-yard pass from Drew VanVleet, Danny Baker kick (Drive: 10 plays, 93 yards, 5:21; Dayton 21–14)

Statistics	DAY	BUT
First downs	19	13
Total yards	320	260
Rushing yards	183	163
Passing yards	137	97
Passing: Comp–Att–Int	11–15–0	13–19–1
Time of possession	35:18	24:42

Team	Category	Player	Statistics
Dayton	Passing	Drew VanVleet	11/14, 137 yards, 3 TD
Dayton	Rushing	Mason Hackett	35 carries, 111 yards
Dayton	Receiving	Luke Brenner	3 receptions, 56 yards, 2 TD
Butler	Passing	Reagan Andrew	10/14, 50 yards, INT
Butler	Rushing	Reagan Andrew	8 carries, 87 yards, TD
Butler	Receiving	Luke Wooten	6 receptions, 50 yards

=== at Davidson ===
Game Eight – Butler Bulldogs (5–2) at Davidson Wildcats (5–2) – Game summary

Quarter	1	2	3	4	Total
Bulldogs	14	14	10	10	48
Wildcats	7	10	7	14	38

at Richardson Stadium • Davidson, North Carolina

- Date: Saturday October 26, 2024
- Game time: 1:00 p.m. EDT
- Game weather: Sunny • Temperature: 78 °F (26 °C) • Wind: N at 3 miles per hour (4.8 km/h)
- Game attendance: 2,979
- Referee: Bilah Abdullah
- TV: ESPN+

Game information

First quarter

- (12:58) BUT – Billy Dozier 63-yard run, Ryan Short kick (Drive: 1 plays, 63 yards, 0:11; Butler 7–0)
- (8:37) BUT – Devaon Holman 20-yard interception return, Ryan Short kick (Butler 14–0)
- (1:02) DAV – Mari Adams 4-yard run, Adam Zouagui kick (Drive: 11 plays, 77 yards, 5:54; Butler 14–7)

Second quarter

- (13:45) BUT – Reagan Andrew 5-yard run, Ryan Short kick (Drive: 6 plays, 75 yards, 2:17; Butler 21–7)
- (4:29) DAV – Adam Zouagui 26-yard field goal (Drive: 16 plays, 81 yards, 9:08; Butler 21–10)
- (2:28) DAV – Mari Adams 5-yard run, Adam Zouagui kick (Drive: 2 plays, 10 yards, 0:30; Butler 21–17)
- (0:27) BUT – Griffin Caldwell 13-yard run, Ryan Short kick (Drive: 6 plays, 75 yards, 2:01; Butler 28–17)

Third quarter

- (12:17) BUT – Ryan Short 26-yard field goal (Drive: 7 plays, 66 yards, 2:43; Butler 31–17)
- (4:49) BUT – Nick Howard 4-yard run, Ryan Short kick (Drive: 7 plays, 90 yards, 4:49; Butler 38–17)
- (1:18) DAV – Jaleel Sales 15-yard pass from Luke Durkin, Adam Zouagui kick (Drive: 9 plays, 75 yards, 3:31; Butler 38–24)

Fourth quarter

- (12:58) BUT – Ryan Short 31-yard field goal (Drive: 8 plays, 29 yards, 3:12; Butler 41–24)
- (6:01) DAV – Brody Reina 33-yard pass from Luke Durkin, Adam Zouagui kick (Drive: 3 plays, 52 yards, 0:54; Butler 41–31)
- (2:09) BUT – Reagan Andrew 41-yard run, Ryan Short kick (Drive: 6 plays, 75 yards, 3:52; Butler 48–31)
- (1:00) DAV – Ivan Hoyt 28-yard pass from Andrew Frazier, Adam Zouagui kick (Drive: 6 plays, 75 yards, 1:09; Butler 48–38)

Statistics	BUT	DAV
First downs	18	28
Total yards	460	440
Rushing yards	283	187
Passing yards	177	253
Passing: Comp–Att–Int	8–18–1	15–24–2
Time of possession	25:49	34:11

Team	Category	Player	Statistics
Butler	Passing	Reagan Andrew	6/15, 112 yards, INT
Butler	Rushing	Reagan Andrew	13 carries, 98 yards, 2 TD
Butler	Receiving	Luke Wooten	4 receptions, 100 yards
Davidson	Passing	Luke Durkin	9/14, 155 yards, 2 TD
Davidson	Rushing	Mari Adams	18 carries, 103 yards, 2 TD
Davidson	Receiving	Brody Reina	5 receptions, 118 yards, TD

=== Stetson ===
Game Nine – Stetson Hatters (2–5) at Butler Bulldogs (6–2) – Game summary

Quarter	1	2	3	4	Total
Hatters	0	0	7	6	13
Bulldogs	10	15	7	14	46

at Bud and Jackie Sellick Bowl • Indianapolis, Indiana

- Date: Saturday November 2, 2024
- Game time: 1:00 p.m. EDT
- Game weather: Sunny • Temperature: 50 °F (10 °C) • Wind: SE at 5 miles per hour (8.0 km/h)
- Game attendance: 2,518
- Referee: David Hergert
- TV: FloFootball

Game information

First quarter

- (11:40) BUT – Griffin Caldwell 11-yard run, Ryan Short kick (Drive: 6 plays, 80 yards, 3:15; Butler 7–0)
- (5:30) BUT – Ryan Short 35-yard field goal (Drive: 9 plays, 60 yards, 5:17; Butler 10–0)

Second quarter

- (10:31) BUT – Trevon Brown 10-yard pass from Nick Howard, Ryan Short kick (Drive: 11 plays, 98 yards, 6:15; Butler 17–0)
- (0:23) BUT – Nick Howard 7-yard run, Reagan Andrew run (Drive: 14 plays, 64 yards, 4:31; Butler 25–0)

Third quarter

- (8:36) BUT – Nick Howard 8-yard run, Ryan Short kick (Drive: 10 plays, 76 yards, 5:01; Butler 32–0)
- (4:37) STET – Dalton Bailey 20-yard pass from Brady Meitz, Daniel Holbrook kick (Drive: 11 plays, 75 yards, 3:59; Butler 32–7)

Fourth quarter

- (11:53) BUT – Nick Howard 5-yard run, Ryan Short kick (Drive: 8 plays, 39 yards, 3:45; Butler 39–7)
- (4:27) BUT – Jeremiah Jackson 100-yard interception return, Sam Taglia kick (Butler 46–7)
- (1:27) STET – Donovan Snyder 2-yard run (Drive: 12 plays, 75 yards, 2:56; Butler 46–13)

Statistics	STET	BUT
First downs	22	24
Total yards	329	471
Rushing yards	119	283
Passing yards	210	188
Passing: Comp–Att–Int	27–40–2	13–19–0
Time of possession	27:20	32:40

Team	Category	Player	Statistics
Stetson	Passing	Brady Meitz	27/40, 210 yards, TD, 2 INT
Stetson	Rushing	Donovan Snyder	16 carries, 57 yards, TD
Stetson	Receiving	Dalton Bailey	10 receptions, 91 yards, TD
Butler	Passing	Reagan Andrew	11/15, 144 yards
Butler	Rushing	Nick Howard	19 carries, 92 yards, 3 TD
Butler	Receiving	Ethan Loss	3 receptions, 47 yards

=== at Valparaiso (Hoosier Helmet Trophy) ===
Game Ten – Butler Bulldogs (7–2) at Valparaiso Beacons (3–5) – Game summary

Quarter	1	2	3	4	Total
Bulldogs	7	10	0	7	24
Beacons	0	10	0	7	17

at Brown Field • Valparaiso, Indiana

- Date: Saturday November 9, 2024
- Game time: 2:00 p.m. EST
- Game weather: Cloudy • Temperature: 53 °F (12 °C) • Wind: SE at 10 miles per hour (16 km/h)
- Game attendance: 1,783
- Referee: Chris Rick
- TV: ESPN+

Game information

First quarter

- (3:02) BUT – Nick Howard 1-yard run, Ryan Short kick (Drive: 11 plays, 80 yards, 6:20; Butler 7–0)

Second quarter

- (14:07) BUT – Ryan Short 41-yard field goal (Drive: 6 plays, 43 yards, 1:43; Butler 10–0)
- (7:12) VAL – Gary Givens III 33-yard pass from Caron Tyler, Ryan Hawk kick (Drive: 4 plays, 43 yards, 2:15; Butler 10–7)
- (3:09) BUT – Reagan Andrew 1-yard run, Ryan Short kick (Drive: 7 plays, 78 yards, 3:57; Butler 17–7)
- (0:07) VAL – Ryan Hawk 27-yard field goal (Drive: 9 plays, 53 yards, 2:53; Butler 17–10)

Third quarter

No scoring plays

Fourth quarter

- (12:19) BUT – Joey Suchy 36-yard run, Ryan Short kick (Drive: 10 plays, 80 yards, 5:17; Butler 24–10)
- (7:19) VAL – Michael Mansaray 5-yard run, Ryan Hawk kick (Drive: 8 plays, 60 yards, 4:56; Butler 24–17)

Statistics	BUT	VAL
First downs	17	12
Total yards	384	263
Rushing yards	145	105
Passing yards	239	158
Passing: Comp–Att–Int	16–23–0	8–17–0
Time of possession	32:01	27:59

Team	Category	Player	Statistics
Butler	Passing	Reagan Andrew	15/22, 232 yards
Butler	Rushing	Nick Howard	13 carries, 50 yards, TD
Butler	Receiving	Luke Wooten	8 receptions, 138 yards
Valparaiso	Passing	Caron Tyler	8/16, 158 yards, TD
Valparaiso	Rushing	Michael Mansaray	23 carries, 82 yards, TD
Valparaiso	Receiving	Gary Givens III	3 receptions, 93 yards, TD

=== St. Thomas (MN) ===
Game Eleven – St. Thomas Tommies (5–5) vs No. 25 Butler Bulldogs (8–2) – Game summary

Quarter	1	2	3	4	Total
Tommies	7	0	7	6	20
No. 25 Bulldogs	7	6	10	13	36

at Bud and Jackie Sellick Bowl, Indianapolis, Indiana

- Date: Saturday November 16, 2024
- Game time: 1:00 p.m. EST
- Game weather: Cloudy • Temperature: 51 °F (11 °C) • Wind: SE at 6 miles per hour (9.7 km/h)
- Game attendance: 2,926
- Referee: Tim Duffy
- TV: FloFootball

Game information

First quarter

- (4:36) BUT – Luke Wooten 36-yard pass from Reagan Andrew, Ryan Short kick (Drive: 11 plays, 78 yards, 5:11; Butler 7–0)
- (2:59) STMN – Tak Tateoka 1-yard run, Ben Hoiland kick (Drive: 4 plays, 75 yards, 1:37; Tied 7–7)

Second quarter

- (6:13) BUT – Trevon Brown 20-yard pass from Nick Howard (Drive: 5 plays, 33 yards, 2:09; Butler 13–7)

Third quarter

- (12:24) BUT – Nick Howard 2-yard run, Ryan Short kick (Drive: 6 plays, 36 yards, 2:36; Butler 20–7)
- (4:18) STMN – Colin Chase 12-yard pass from Tak Tateoka, Ben Hoiland kick (Drive: 6 plays, 79 yards, 2:55; Butler 20–14)
- (0:01) BUT – Ryan Short 23-yard field goal (Drive: 8 plays, 57 yards, 4:13; Butler 23–14)

Fourth quarter

- (9:14) BUT – Nick Howard 5-yard run (Drive: 1 plays, 5 yards, 0:04; Butler 29–14)
- (8:30) STMN – Colin Chase 25-yard pass from Michael Rostberg (Drive: 2 plays, 33 yards, 0:31; Butler 29–20)
- (3:15) BUT – Nick Howard 28-yard run, Sam Taglia kick (Drive: 9 plays, 75 yards, 5:15; Butler 36–20)

Statistics	STMN	BUT
First downs	16	21
Total yards	367	379
Rushing yards	62	168
Passing yards	305	211
Passing: Comp–Att–Int	18–36–4	16–22–0
Time of possession	23:32	36:28

Team	Category	Player	Statistics
St. Thomas (MN)	Passing	Tak Tateoka	13/26, 214 yards, TD, 2 INT
St. Thomas (MN)	Rushing	Hope Adebayo	12 carries, 61 yards
St. Thomas (MN)	Receiving	Colin Chase	5 receptions, 121 yards, 2 TD
Butler	Passing	Reagan Andrew	14/19, 184 yards, TD
Butler	Rushing	Nick Howard	22 carries, 97 yards, 3 TD
Butler	Receiving	Luke Wooten	5 receptions, 111 yards, TD

=== at Presbyterian ===
Game Twelve – No. 23 Butler Bulldogs (9–2) at Presbyterian Blue Hose (5–6) – Game summary

Quarter	1	2	3	4	Total
No. 23 Bulldogs	0	6	14	7	27
Blue Hose	0	14	13	3	30

at Bailey Memorial Stadium • Clinton, South Carolina

- Date: Saturday November 23, 2024
- Game time: 1:00 p.m. EST
- Game weather: Sunny • Temperature: 60 °F (16 °C) • Wind: NW at 6 miles per hour (9.7 km/h)
- Game attendance: 4,000
- Referee: Jason Graham
- TV announcers (ESPN+): Gabriel Schray (play-by-play) and Tim Webb (analyst)

Game information

First quarter

No scoring plays

Second quarter

- (8:23) PRES – Worth Warner 8-yard pass from Collin Hurst, Peter Lipscombe kick (Drive: 2 plays, 41 yards, 0:38; Presbyterian 7–0)
- (3:33) PRES – Collin Hurst 4-yard run, Peter Lipscombe kick (Drive: 3 plays, 82 yards, 1:24; Presbyterian 14–0)
- (0:30) BUT – Trevon Brown 15-yard pass from Reagan Andrew (Drive: 12 plays, 77 yards, 2:55; Presbyterian 14–6)

Third quarter

- (13:55) BUT – Griffin Caldwell 23-yard run, Sam Taglia kick (Drive: 3 plays, 42 yards, 0:55; Presbyterian 14–13)
- (10:48) BUT – Ethan Loss 15-yard pass from Reagan Andrew, Ryan Short kick (Drive: 6 plays, 42 yards, 2:58; Butler 20–14)
- (7:58) PRES – Worth Warner 17-yard pass from Collin Hurst (Drive: 5 plays, 75 yards, 2:50; Tied 20–20)
- (4:43) PRES – Quante Jennings 10-yard run, Peter Lipscombe kick (Drive: 6 plays, 30 yards, 2:16; Presbyterian 27–20)

Fourth quarter

- (2:15) PRES – Peter Lipscombe 18-yard field goal (Drive: 15 plays, 89 yards, 9:14; Presbyterian 30–20)
- (1:06) BUT – Ethan Loss 42-yard pass from Reagan Andrew, Sam Taglia kick (Drive: 5 plays, 61 yards, 0:39; Presbyterian 30–27)

Statistics	BUT	PRES
First downs	22	21
Total yards	346	460
Rushing yards	126	288
Passing yards	220	172
Passing: Comp–Att–Int	20–38–1	16–24–0
Time of possession	30:38	29:22

Team	Category	Player	Statistics
Butler	Passing	Reagan Andrew	20/36, 220 yards, 3 TD, INT
Butler	Rushing	Griffin Caldwell	6 carries, 48 yards, TD
Butler	Receiving	Ethan Loss	5 receptions, 80 yards, 2 TD
Presbyterian	Passing	Collin Hurst	16/24, 172 yards, 2 TD
Presbyterian	Rushing	Quante Jennings	15 carries, 190 yards, TD
Presbyterian	Receiving	Dominic Kibby	2 receptions, 65 yards
