= 2024 Holy Cross Crusaders football team =

American college football season

2024 Holy Cross Crusaders football

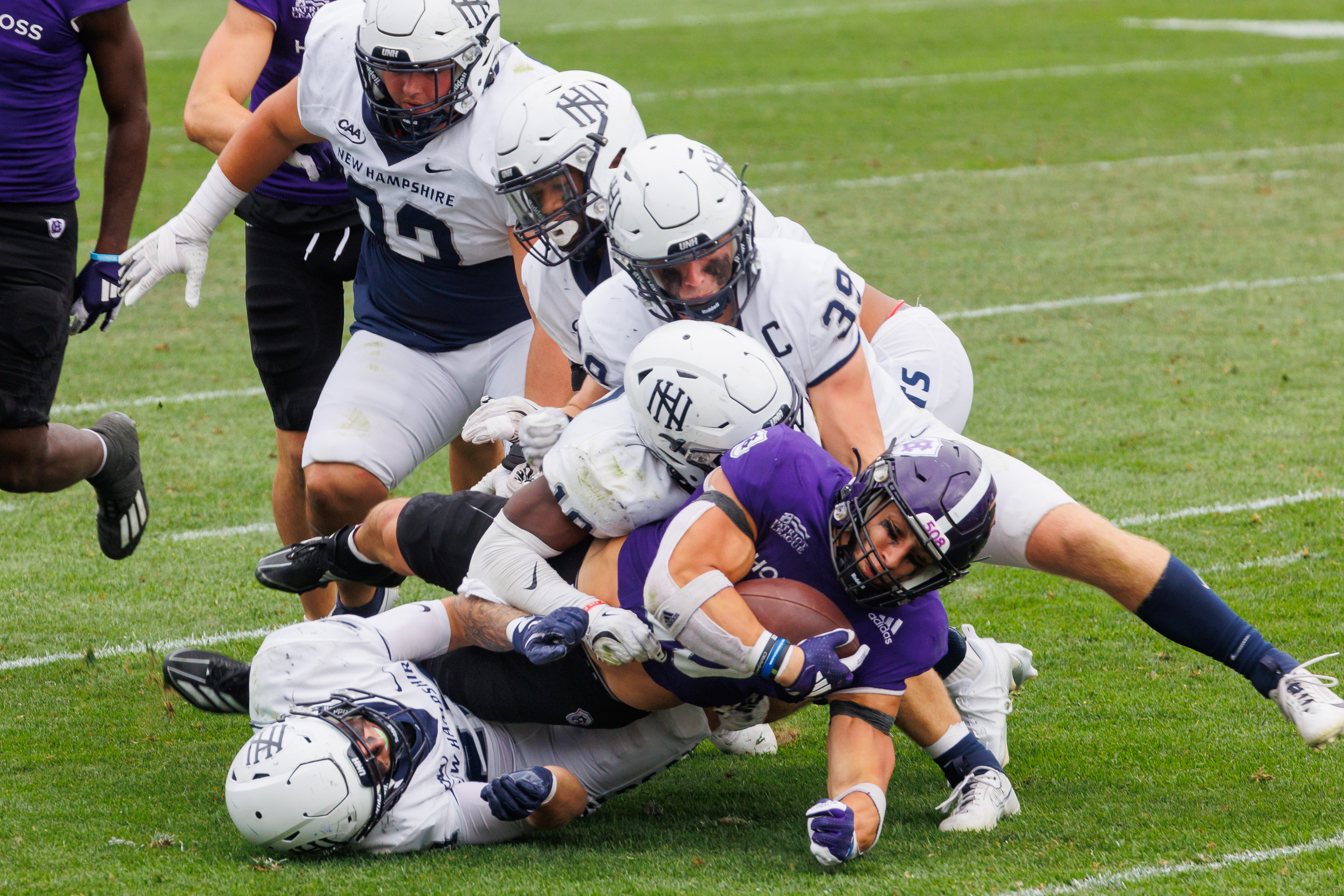
- The Crusaders lost to the Wildcats, 20-21

Patriot League co-champion
- Conference: Patriot League
- Record: 6–6 (5–1 Patriot)
- Head coach: Dan Curran (1st season)
- Offensive coordinator: Andrew Dresner (1st season)
- Defensive coordinator: Brian Vaganek (1st season)
- Home stadium: Fitton Field

2024 Patriot League football standings
	Conf.			Overall
Team	W		L	W		L
No. 20 Lehigh +^	5	–	1	9	–	4
Holy Cross +	5	–	1	6	–	6
Bucknell	4	–	2	6	–	6
Lafayette	2	–	4	6	–	6
Georgetown	2	–	4	5	–	6
Fordham	2	–	4	2	–	10
Colgate	1	–	5	2	–	10
+ – Conference co-champions; ^ – FCS playoff participant; Rankings from STATS Poll

The 2024 Holy Cross Crusaders football team represented the College of the Holy Cross as a member of the Patriot League during the 2024 NCAA Division I FCS football season. The Crusaders were led by first-year head coach Dan Curran and played their home games at Fitton Field in Worcester, Massachusetts.

== Schedule ==
Date	Time	Opponent	Site	TV	Result	Attendance
August 31	7:00 p.m.	at Rhode Island*	Meade Stadium; Kingston, RI	FloFootball	L 17–20	5,770
September 7	2:00 p.m.	New Hampshire*	Fitton Field; Worcester, MA	ESPN+	L 20–21	10,815
September 14	2:00 p.m.	at Bryant*	Beirne Stadium; Smithfield, RI	FloFootball	W 43–22	N/A
September 21	2:00 p.m.	Yale*	Fitton Field; Worcester, MA	ESPN+	L 31–38	15,117
September 28	12:00 p.m.	at Syracuse*	JMA Wireless Dome; Syracuse, NY	ACCNX	L 14–42	43,455
October 5	1:00 p.m.	at Colgate	Crown Field at Andy Kerr Stadium; Hamilton, NY	ESPN+	W 38–7	821
October 12	1:00 p.m.	Fordham^{†}	Fitton Field; Worcester, MA (Ram–Crusader Cup)	ESPN+	W 19–16	10,223
October 19	12:00 p.m.	at Harvard*	Harvard Stadium; Cambridge, MA	ESPN+	L 34–35	6,950
October 26	1:30 p.m.	at Lafayette	Fisher Stadium; Easton, PA	ESPN+	W 34–28	5,774
November 9	12:00 p.m.	Lehigh	Fitton Field; Worcester, MA	ESPN+	L 7–10	12,910
November 16	12:00 p.m.	Bucknell	Fitton Field; Worcester, MA	ESPN+	W 40–38	11,357
November 23	12:30 p.m.	at Georgetown	Cooper Field; Washington, D.C.	ESPN+	W 34–0	3,575
*Non-conference game; ^{†}Homecoming; All times are in Eastern time

== Game summaries ==
=== at Rhode Island ===
Game One – Holy Cross Crusaders (0–0) at Rhode Island Rams (0–0) – Game summary

Quarter	1	2	3	4	Total
Crusaders	0	0	0	0	0
Rams	0	0	0	0	0

at Meade Stadium • Kingston, Rhode Island

- Date: August 31, 2024
- Game time: 7:00 p.m.
- TV: FloSports

Game information

First quarter
Second quarter
Third quarter
Fourth quarter

Statistics	HC	URI
First downs		
Total yards		
Rushing yards		
Passing yards		
Passing: Comp–Att–Int		
Time of possession		

Team	Category	Player	Statistics
Holy Cross	Passing		
Holy Cross	Rushing		
Holy Cross	Receiving		
Rhode Island	Passing		
Rhode Island	Rushing		
Rhode Island	Receiving		

=== New Hampshire ===
Game Two – New Hampshire Wildcats (0–1) vs Holy Cross Crusaders (0–1) – Game summary

Quarter	1	2	3	4	Total
Wildcats	0	0	0	0	0
Crusaders	0	0	0	0	0

at Fitton Field • Worcester, MA

- Date: Saturday September 7, 2024
- Game time: 2:00 p.m.
- Game weather: 0 °F (−18 °C)
- TV: ESPN+

Game information

First quarter
Second quarter
Third quarter
Fourth quarter

Statistics	UNH	HC
First downs		
Total yards		
Rushing yards		
Passing yards		
Passing: Comp–Att–Int		
Time of possession		

Team	Category	Player	Statistics
New Hampshire	Passing		
New Hampshire	Rushing		
New Hampshire	Receiving		
Holy Cross	Passing		
Holy Cross	Rushing		
Holy Cross	Receiving		

=== at Bryant ===
Game Three – Holy Cross Crusaders (0–2) at Bryant Bulldogs (1–1) – Game summary

Quarter	1	2	3	4	Total
Crusaders	0	0	0	0	0
Bulldogs	0	0	0	0	0

at Beirne Stadium • Smithfield, Rhode Island

- Date: September 14, 2024
- Game time: 2:00 p.m.
- TV: FloSports

Game information

First quarter
Second quarter
Third quarter
Fourth quarter

Statistics	HC	BRY
First downs		
Total yards		
Rushing yards		
Passing yards		
Passing: Comp–Att–Int		
Time of possession		

Team	Category	Player	Statistics
Holy Cross	Passing		
Holy Cross	Rushing		
Holy Cross	Receiving		
Bryant	Passing		
Bryant	Rushing		
Bryant	Receiving		

=== Yale ===
Game Four – Yale Bulldogs (0–0) vs Holy Cross Crusaders (1–2) – Game summary

Quarter	1	2	3	4	Total
Bulldogs	0	0	0	0	0
Crusaders	0	0	0	0	0

at Fitton Field • Worcester, MA

- Date: Saturday September 21, 2024
- Game time: 2:00 p.m.
- Game weather: 0 °F (−18 °C)
- TV: ESPN+

Game information

First quarter
Second quarter
Third quarter
Fourth quarter

Statistics	YALE	HC
First downs		
Total yards		
Rushing yards		
Passing yards		
Passing: Comp–Att–Int		
Time of possession		

Team	Category	Player	Statistics
Yale	Passing		
Yale	Rushing		
Yale	Receiving		
Holy Cross	Passing		
Holy Cross	Rushing		
Holy Cross	Receiving		

=== at Syracuse (FBS) ===
Game Five – Holy Cross Crusaders (1–3) at Syracuse Orange (FBS) (2–1) – Game summary

Quarter	1	2	3	4	Total
Crusaders	0	0	0	0	0
Orange (FBS)	0	0	0	0	0

at JMA Wireless Dome • Syracuse, New York

- Date: September 28, 2024
- Game time: 12:00 p.m.
- TV announcers (ACCNX): Noah Reed (play-by-play) and Craig Haubert (analyst)

Game information

First quarter
Second quarter
Third quarter
Fourth quarter

Statistics	HC	SYR
First downs		
Total yards		
Rushing yards		
Passing yards		
Passing: Comp–Att–Int		
Time of possession		

Team	Category	Player	Statistics
Holy Cross	Passing		
Holy Cross	Rushing		
Holy Cross	Receiving		
Syracuse	Passing		
Syracuse	Rushing		
Syracuse	Receiving		

=== at Colgate ===
Game Six – Holy Cross Crusaders (1–4) at Colgate Raiders (1–4) – Game summary

Quarter	1	2	3	4	Total
Crusaders	0	0	0	0	0
Raiders	0	0	0	0	0

at Andy Kerr Stadium • Hamilton, NY

- Date: October 5, 2024
- Game time: 1:00 p.m.
- Game weather: 0 °F (−18 °C)
- TV: ESPN+

Game information

First quarter
Second quarter
Third quarter
Fourth quarter

Statistics	HC	COLG
First downs		
Total yards		
Rushing yards		
Passing yards		
Passing: Comp–Att–Int		
Time of possession		

Team	Category	Player	Statistics
Holy Cross	Passing		
Holy Cross	Rushing		
Holy Cross	Receiving		
Colgate	Passing		
Colgate	Rushing		
Colgate	Receiving		

=== Fordham (Ram–Crusader Cup) ===
Game Seven – Fordham Rams (0–6) vs Holy Cross Crusaders (2–4) – Game summary

Quarter	1	2	3	4	Total
Rams	0	0	0	0	0
Crusaders	0	0	0	0	0

at Fitton Field • Worcester, MA

- Date: Saturday October 12, 2024
- Game time: 1:00 p.m.
- Game weather: 0 °F (−18 °C)
- TV: ESPN+

Game information

First quarter
Second quarter
Third quarter
Fourth quarter

Statistics	FOR	HC
First downs		
Total yards		
Rushing yards		
Passing yards		
Passing: Comp–Att–Int		
Time of possession		

Team	Category	Player	Statistics
Fordham	Passing		
Fordham	Rushing		
Fordham	Receiving		
Holy Cross	Passing		
Holy Cross	Rushing		
Holy Cross	Receiving		

=== at Harvard ===
Game Eight – Holy Cross Crusaders (3–4) at Harvard Crimson (3–1) – Game summary

Quarter	1	2	3	4	Total
Crusaders	0	0	0	0	0
Crimson	0	0	0	0	0

at Harvard Stadium • Cambridge, MA

- Date: Saturday October 19, 2024
- Game time: 12:00 p.m.
- Game weather: 0 °F (−18 °C)
- TV: ESPN+

Game information

First quarter
Second quarter
Third quarter
Fourth quarter

Statistics	HC	HARV
First downs		
Total yards		
Rushing yards		
Passing yards		
Passing: Comp–Att–Int		
Time of possession		

Team	Category	Player	Statistics
Holy Cross	Passing		
Holy Cross	Rushing		
Holy Cross	Receiving		
Harvard	Passing		
Harvard	Rushing		
Harvard	Receiving		

=== at Lafayette ===
Game Nine – Holy Cross Crusaders (3–5) at Lafayette Leopards (4–3) – Game summary

Quarter	1	2	3	4	Total
Crusaders	0	0	0	0	0
Leopards	0	0	0	0	0

at Fisher Stadium • Easton, Pennsylvania

- Date: Saturday October 26, 2024
- Game time: 1:30 PM
- Game weather: 0 °F (−18 °C)
- TV: ESPN+

Game information

First quarter
Second quarter
Third quarter
Fourth quarter

Statistics	HC	LAF
First downs		
Total yards		
Rushing yards		
Passing yards		
Passing: Comp–Att–Int		
Time of possession		

Team	Category	Player	Statistics
Holy Cross	Passing		
Holy Cross	Rushing		
Holy Cross	Receiving		
Lafayette	Passing		
Lafayette	Rushing		
Lafayette	Receiving		

=== Lehigh ===
Game Ten – Lehigh Mountain Hawks (5–3) vs Holy Cross Crusaders (4–5) – Game summary

Quarter	1	2	3	4	Total
Mountain Hawks	0	0	0	0	0
Crusaders	0	0	0	0	0

at Fitton Field • Worcester, MA

- Date: Saturday November 9, 2024
- Game time: 12:00 p.m.
- Game weather: 0 °F (−18 °C)
- TV: ESPN+

Game information

First quarter
Second quarter
Third quarter
Fourth quarter

Statistics	LEH	HC
First downs		
Total yards		
Rushing yards		
Passing yards		
Passing: Comp–Att–Int		
Time of possession		

Team	Category	Player	Statistics
Lehigh	Passing		
Lehigh	Rushing		
Lehigh	Receiving		
Holy Cross	Passing		
Holy Cross	Rushing		
Holy Cross	Receiving		

=== Bucknell ===
Game Eleven – Bucknell Bison (5–5) vs Holy Cross Crusaders (4–6) – Game summary

Quarter	1	2	3	4	Total
Bison	0	0	0	0	0
Crusaders	0	0	0	0	0

at Fitton Field • Worcester, MA

- Date: Saturday November 16, 2024
- Game time: 12:00 p.m.
- Game weather: 0 °F (−18 °C)
- TV: ESPN+

Game information

First quarter
Second quarter
Third quarter
Fourth quarter

Statistics	BUCK	HC
First downs		
Total yards		
Rushing yards		
Passing yards		
Passing: Comp–Att–Int		
Time of possession		

Team	Category	Player	Statistics
Bucknell	Passing		
Bucknell	Rushing		
Bucknell	Receiving		
Holy Cross	Passing		
Holy Cross	Rushing		
Holy Cross	Receiving		

=== at Georgetown ===
Game Twelve – Holy Cross Crusaders (5–6) at Georgetown Hoyas (5–5) – Game summary

Quarter	1	2	3	4	Total
Crusaders	17	3	7	7	34
Hoyas	0	0	0	0	0

at Cooper Field • Washington, D.C.

- Date: Saturday November 23, 2024
- Game time: 12:30 p.m. EST
- Game attendance: 3,575
- TV announcers (ESPN+): TBD

Game information

First quarter

- HC – Daniel Porto 28 Yd Field Goal, 9:26. Crusaders 3–0, Drive: 7 plays, 35 yards, 3:38
- HC – Joe Townsend 10 Yd Punt Return (Daniel Porto Kick), 7:49. Crusaders 10–0, Drive: 3 plays, 4 yards, 1:29
- HC – Jayden Clerveaux 18 Yd Run (Daniel Porto Kick), 0:43. Crusaders 17–0, Drive: 7 plays, 76 yards, 3:56

Second quarter

- HC – Daniel Porto 48 Yd Field Goal, 12:13. Crusaders 20–0, Drive: 6 plays, 14 yards, 2:47

Third quarter

- HC – Jayden Clerveaux 3 Yd Run (Daniel Porto Kick), 7:24. Crusaders 27–0, Drive: 13 plays, 46 yards, 7:28

Fourth quarter

- HC – Byron Shipman 12 Yd pass from Joe Pesansky (Daniel Porto Kick), 9:00. Crusaders 34–0, Drive: 3 plays, 18 yards, 3:40

Statistics	HC	GTWN
First downs	15	12
Total yards	293	184
Rushing yards	193	99
Passing yards	100	85
Passing: Comp–Att–Int	8−17−3	13−30−1
Time of possession	34:42	25:18

Team	Category	Player	Statistics
Holy Cross	Passing	Joe Pesansky	8/16, 100 yards, 1 TD, 2 INTs
Holy Cross	Rushing	Jayden Clerveaux	23 carries, 135 yards, 2 TDs
Holy Cross	Receiving	Nathan Schillinger	2 receptions, 34 yards
Georgetown	Passing	Jacob Holtschlag	13/30, 85 yards, 1 INT
Georgetown	Rushing	Bryce Cox	7 carries, 58 yards
Georgetown	Receiving	Cam Pygatt	1 reception, 21 yards
