= 2024 SWAC Football Championship Game =

College football game

- Conference Championship
Southern Jaguars	Jackson State Tigers
(8–4)	(10–2)
13	41
Head coach: Terrence Graves	Head coach: T. C. Taylor
	Coaches / STATS; 15 / 18
	1	2	3	4	Total
Southern	0	10	0	3	13
Jackson State	3	7	17	14	41
- Date: December 7, 2024
- Season: 2024
- Stadium: Mississippi Veterans Memorial Stadium
- Location: Jackson, Mississippi
- Referee: Charles Green

United States TV coverage
- Network: ESPN2; OpenMic Broadcast Network
- Announcers: Tiffany Greene (play-by-play), Jay Walker (analyst), and Coley Harvey (sideline reporter) (ESPN2); Rob Jay (play-by-play), Darrell Asberry (analyst), and Jamye Horton (sideline reporter) (OpenMic)

International TV coverage
- Network: Canada: TSN+

2024 Southwestern Athletic Conference football standings
	Conf.			Overall
Team	W		L	W		L
East Division
No. 18 Jackson State xy$	8	–	1	12	–	2
Florida A&M	5	–	3	7	–	5
Alabama State	5	–	3	7	–	5
Alabama A&M	4	–	4	6	–	6
Bethune–Cookman	2	–	6	2	–	10
Mississippi Valley State	1	–	7	1	–	11
West Division
Southern xy	7	–	2	8	–	5
Alcorn State	5	–	3	6	–	6
Texas Southern	4	–	4	5	–	6
Prairie View A&M	3	–	5	5	–	7
Grambling State	2	–	6	5	–	7
Arkansas–Pine Bluff	2	–	6	3	–	9
Championship: Jackson State 41, Southern 13
$ – Conference champion; x – Division champion/co-champions; y – Championship game participant; Rankings from STATS Poll

The 2024 Pepsi SWAC Championship Game was a college football game played on December 7, 2024, at Mississippi Veterans Memorial Stadium in Jackson, Mississippi. It was the 26th edition of the SWAC Championship Game and determined the champion of the Southwestern Athletic Conference (SWAC) for the 2024 season. The game began at 3:00 p.m. CST on ESPN2. The game featured the Jackson State Tigers, the East Division champions, defeating the Southern Jaguars, the West Division champions.
