= 2024 Prairie View A&M Panthers football team =

American college football season

2024 Prairie View A&M Panthers football
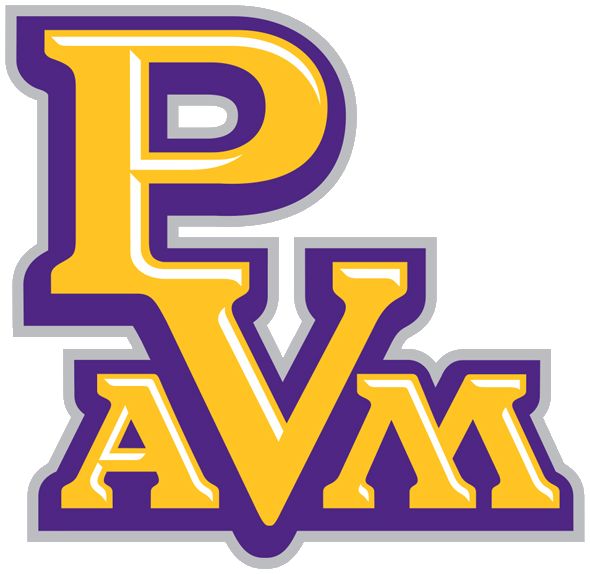
- Conference: Southwestern Athletic Conference
- West Division
- Record: 5–7 (3–5 SWAC)
- Head coach: Bubba McDowell (3rd season)
- Offensive coordinator: Anthony Weeden (1st season)
- Defensive coordinator: Todd Middleton (3rd season)
- Home stadium: Panther Stadium at Blackshear Field

2024 Southwestern Athletic Conference football standings
| | Conf. | | | Overall |
| Team | W | | L | W | | L |
|---|---|---|---|---|---|---|
East Division
| No. 18 Jackson State xy$ | 8 | – | 1 | 12 | – | 2 |
| Florida A&M | 5 | – | 3 | 7 | – | 5 |
| Alabama State | 5 | – | 3 | 7 | – | 5 |
| Alabama A&M | 4 | – | 4 | 6 | – | 6 |
| Bethune–Cookman | 2 | – | 6 | 2 | – | 10 |
| Mississippi Valley State | 1 | – | 7 | 1 | – | 11 |
West Division
| Southern xy | 7 | – | 2 | 8 | – | 5 |
| Alcorn State | 5 | – | 3 | 6 | – | 6 |
| Texas Southern | 4 | – | 4 | 5 | – | 6 |
| Prairie View A&M | 3 | – | 5 | 5 | – | 7 |
| Grambling State | 2 | – | 6 | 5 | – | 7 |
| Arkansas–Pine Bluff | 2 | – | 6 | 3 | – | 9 |
Championship: Jackson State 41, Southern 13
$ – Conference champion; x – Division champion/co-champions; y – Championship game participant; Rankings from STATS Poll

The 2024 Prairie View A&M Panthers football team represented Prairie View A&M University as a member of the Southwestern Athletic Conference (SWAC) during the 2024 NCAA Division I FCS football season. The Panthers were coached by third-year head coach Bubba McDowell and played at Panther Stadium at Blackshear Field in Prairie View, Texas.

Following the conclusion of the Panthers' season, athletic director Anton Goff announced that McDowell's contract would not be renewed. On December 21, Valdosta State head coach Tremaine Jackson was announced as the Panthers' new head coach.

== Schedule ==
| Date | Time | Opponent | Site | TV | Result | Attendance |
|---|---|---|---|---|---|---|
| August 31 | 6:00 p.m. | Texas Southern | Panther Stadium; Prairie View, TX (Labor Day Classic) | ESPN+ | L 9–27 | 13,206 |
| September 7 | 6:00 p.m. | at Northwestern State* | Harry Turpin Stadium; Natchitoches, LA | ESPN+ | W 37–31 | 9,132 |
| September 14 | 2:30 p.m. | at Michigan State* | Spartan Stadium; East Lansing, MI | BTN | L 0–40 | 70,066 |
| September 21 | 6:00 p.m. | Southern | Panther Stadium; Prairie View, TX | ESPN+ | L 24–31 ^{OT} | 9,880 |
| September 28 | 6:00 p.m. | vs. Grambling State | Cotton Bowl; Dallas, TX (State Fair Classic) | ESPN+ | W 36–34 ^{5OT} | 52,323 |
| October 5 | 6:00 p.m. | at No. 15 Incarnate Word* | Gayle and Tom Benson Stadium; San Antonio, TX | ESPN+ | L 28–56 | 2,003 |
| October 11 | 8:15 p.m. | at Arkansas–Pine Bluff | Simmons Bank Field; Pine Bluff, AR | ESPNU | L 17–21 | 5,673 |
| October 26 | 2:00 p.m. | Texas A&M–Commerce*^{†} | Panther Stadium; Prairie View, TX | ESPN+ | W 34–27 | 13,937 |
| November 2 | 2:00 p.m. | at Mississippi Valley State | Rice–Totten Stadium; Itta Bena, MS | | W 17–16 | 1,952 |
| November 9 | 2:00 p.m. | Florida A&M | Panther Stadium; Prairie View, TX | | W 31–12 | 3,091 |
| November 16 | 2:00 p.m. | Alcorn State | Panther Stadium; Prairie View, TX | | L 13–26 | 4,869 |
| November 23 | 2:00 p.m. | at Alabama State | ASU Stadium; Montgomery, AL | ESPN+ | L 6–9 | 8,265 |
*Non-conference game; ^{†}Homecoming; Rankings from STATS Poll released prior to the game; All times are in Central time

== Game summaries ==
=== Texas Southern (Labor Day Classic) ===
Game One – Texas Southern Tigers (0–0) at Prairie View A&M Panthers (0–0) – Game summary

| Quarter | 1 | 2 | 3 | 4 | Total |
|---|---|---|---|---|---|
| Tigers | 0 | 0 | 0 | 0 | 0 |
| Panthers | 0 | 0 | 0 | 0 | 0 |

at Panther Stadium • Prairie View, Texas

- Date: Saturday August 31, 2024
- Game time: 6:00 p.m. CDT
- TV announcers (ESPN+): TBD

Game information

First quarter

Second quarter

Third quarter

Fourth quarter

| Statistics | TXSO | PV |
|---|---|---|
| First downs | | |
| Plays–yards | | |
| Rushes–yards | | |
| Passing yards | | |
| Passing: Comp–Att–Int | | |
| Time of possession | | |

| Team | Category | Player | Statistics |
|---|---|---|---|
| Texas Southern | Passing | | |
| Texas Southern | Rushing | | |
| Texas Southern | Receiving | | |
| Prairie View A&M | Passing | | |
| Prairie View A&M | Rushing | | |
| Prairie View A&M | Receiving | | |

=== at Northwestern State ===
Game Two – Prairie View A&M Panthers (0–1) at Northwestern State Demons (0–1) – Game summary

| Quarter | 1 | 2 | 3 | 4 | Total |
|---|---|---|---|---|---|
| Panthers | 10 | 10 | 10 | 7 | 37 |
| Demons | 14 | 0 | 7 | 10 | 31 |

at Harry Turpin Stadium, Natchitoches, Louisiana

- Date: Saturday September 7, 2024
- Game time: 6:00 p.m.
- Game weather: Cloudy, 79 °F (26 °C)
- Game attendance: 9,132
- Referee: Matt Beck
- TV announcers (ESPN+): Patrick Netherton (play-by-play) and Tyler Moody (analyst)

Game information

First quarter

- NWST – Myles Kitt-Denton 71-yard pass from J. T. Fayard (Reed Honshtein kick), 14:46. Demons 7–0. Drive: 1 play, 71 yards, 0:09.
- PV – Albert Thomas 42-yard pass from Cameron Peters (Guillermo Garcia Rodriguez kick), 9:12. Tied 7–7. Drive: 5 plays, 55 yards, 1:50.
- NWST – Emanuel Brown 37-yard interception return (Reed Honshtein kick), 5:19. Demons 14–7.
- PV – Guillermo Garcia Rodriguez 34-yard field goal, 1:08. Demons 14–10. Drive: 8 plays, 62 yards, 4:05.

Second quarter

- PV – Connor Wishman 5-yard run (Guillermo Garcia Rodriguez kick), 12:31. Panthers 17–14. Drive: 4 plays, 51 yards, 2:14.
- PV – Guillermo Garcia Rodriguez 22-yard field goal, 2:53. Panthers 20–14. Drive: 14 plays, 60 yards, 5:41.

Third quarter

- NWST – Kennieth Lacy 55-yard run (Reed Honshtein kick), 11:17. Demons 21–20. Drive: 2 plays, 55 yards, 0:43.
- PV – Shemar Savage 4-yard pass from Cameron Peters (Guillermo Garcia Rodriguez kick), 6:05. Panthers 27–21. Drive: 13 plays, 75 yards, 5:12.
- PV – Guillermo Garcia Rodriguez 41-yard field goal, 0:25. Panthers 30–21. Drive: 10 plays, 44 yards, 3:49.

Fourth quarter

- NWST – Cadillac Rhone 16-yard interception return (Reed Honshtein kick), 13:38. Panthers 30–28.
- PV – Lamagea McDowell 18-yard run (Guillermo Garcia Rodriguez kick), 12:02. Panthers 37–28. Drive: 5 plays, 70 yards, 1:36.
- NWST – Reed Honshtein 38-yard field goal, 7:56. Panthers 37–31. Drive: 5 plays, 17 yards, 1:52.

| Statistics | PV | NWST |
|---|---|---|
| First downs | 25 | 16 |
| Total yards | 468 | 282 |
| Rushing yards | 188 | 105 |
| Passing yards | 280 | 177 |
| Turnovers | 3 | 1 |
| Time of possession | 37:29 | 22:31 |

| Team | Category | Player | Statistics |
|---|---|---|---|
| Prairie View A&M | Passing | Cameron Peters | 18/33, 280 yards, 2 TD, 2 INT |
| Prairie View A&M | Rushing | Connor Wisham | 22 rushes, 83 yards, TD |
| Prairie View A&M | Receiving | Shemar Savage | 6 receptions, 133 yards, TD |
| Northwestern State | Passing | J. T. Fayard | 12/31, 177 yards, TD, INT |
| Northwestern State | Rushing | Kennieth Lacy | 9 rushes, 75 yards, TD |
| Northwestern State | Receiving | Myles Kitt-Denton | 3 receptions, 103 yards, TD |

=== at Michigan State (FBS) ===
Game Three – Prairie View A&M Panthers (1–1) at Michigan State Spartans (FBS) (2–0) – Game summary

| Quarter | 1 | 2 | 3 | 4 | Total |
|---|---|---|---|---|---|
| Panthers | 0 | 0 | 0 | 0 | 0 |
| Spartans (FBS) | 14 | 13 | 3 | 10 | 40 |

at Spartan Stadium, East Lansing, Michigan

- Date: Saturday September 14, 2024
- Game time: 2:30 p.m.
- Game weather: 84 °F (29 °C), Wind: 8 mph W, Sunny
- Game attendance: 70,666
- Referee: Jason Nickleby
- TV announcers (BTN): Mark Followill (play-by-play), Anthony Herron (analyst), and Dannie Rogers (sideline)

Game information

First quarter

- (06:13) MSU TD: Aidan Chiles 6-yard run (Jonathan Kim kick) MSU 7–0; 11 plays, 60 yards, 6:11
- (00:07) MSU TD: Aziah Johnson 17-yard pass from Aidan Chiles (Jonathan Kim kick) MSU 14–0; 9 plays, 69 yards, 4:16

Second quarter

- (04:45) MSU TD: Nate Carter 60-yard run (Jonathan Kim kick) MSU 21–0; 5 plays, 80 yards, 2:58
- (00:42) MSU TD: Charles Brantley 100-yard interception return (Jonathan Kim miss) MSU 27–0

Third quarter

- (08:24) MSU FG: Jonathan Kim 33-yard field goal MSU 30–0; 14 plays, 60 yards, 6:36

Fourth quarter

- (11:46) MSU FG: Jonathan Kim 23-yard field goal MSU 33–0; 12 plays, 84 yards, 7:04
- (03:49) MSU TD: Tommy Schuster 1-yard run (Tarik Ahmetbasic kick) MSU 40–0; 10 plays, 56 yards, 5:35

| Statistics | PV | MSU |
|---|---|---|
| First downs | 10 | 22 |
| Total yards | 140 | 458 |
| Rushing yards | 17 | 188 |
| Passing yards | 123 | 270 |
| Turnovers | 1 | 0 |
| Time of possession | 26:03 | 33:57 |

| Team | Category | Player | Statistics |
|---|---|---|---|
| Prairie View A&M | Passing | Scooter Adams | 9/17, 123 yards, INT |
| Prairie View A&M | Rushing | Scooter Adams | 5 carries, 24 yards |
| Prairie View A&M | Receiving | Tre'Jon Spiller | 7 receptions, 91 yards |
| Michigan State | Passing | Aidan Chiles | 12/19, 173 yards, TD |
| Michigan State | Rushing | Nate Carter | 8 carries, 91 yards, TD |
| Michigan State | Receiving | Aziah Johnson | 2 receptions, 50 yards, TD |

=== Southern ===
Game Four – Southern Jaguars (1–2) vs Prairie View A&M Panthers (1–2) – Game summary

| Quarter | 1 | 2 | 3 | 4 | Total |
|---|---|---|---|---|---|
| Jaguars | 0 | 0 | 0 | 0 | 0 |
| Panthers | 0 | 0 | 0 | 0 | 0 |

at Panther Stadium, Prairie View, Texas

- Date: Saturday September 21, 2024
- Game time: 6:00 p.m.
- TV announcers (ESPN+): TBD

Game information

First quarter
Second quarter
Third quarter
Fourth quarter

| Statistics | SOU | PV |
|---|---|---|
| First downs | | |
| Total yards | | |
| Rushing yards | | |
| Passing yards | | |
| Passing: Comp–Att–Int | | |
| Time of possession | | |

| Team | Category | Player | Statistics |
|---|---|---|---|
| Southern | Passing | | |
| Southern | Rushing | | |
| Southern | Receiving | | |
| Prairie View A&M | Passing | | |
| Prairie View A&M | Rushing | | |
| Prairie View A&M | Receiving | | |

=== vs. Grambling State (State Fair Classic) ===
Game Five – Grambling State Tigers (3–1) vs Prairie View A&M Panthers (1–3) – Game summary

| Quarter | 1 | 2 | 3 | 4 | Total |
|---|---|---|---|---|---|
| Tigers | 0 | 0 | 0 | 0 | 0 |
| Panthers | 0 | 0 | 0 | 0 | 0 |

at Cotton Bowl, Dallas, Texas

- Date: Saturday September 28, 2024
- Game time: 6:00 p.m.
- TV announcers (ESPN+): TBD

Game information

First quarter
Second quarter
Third quarter
Fourth quarter

| Statistics | GRAM | PV |
|---|---|---|
| First downs | | |
| Total yards | | |
| Rushing yards | | |
| Passing yards | | |
| Passing: Comp–Att–Int | | |
| Time of possession | | |

| Team | Category | Player | Statistics |
|---|---|---|---|
| Grambling State | Passing | | |
| Grambling State | Rushing | | |
| Grambling State | Receiving | | |
| Prairie View A&M | Passing | | |
| Prairie View A&M | Rushing | | |
| Prairie View A&M | Receiving | | |

=== at No. 15 Incarnate Word ===
Game Six – Prairie View A&M Panthers (2–3) vs No. 15 Incarnate Word Cardinals (2–2) – Game summary

| Quarter | 1 | 2 | 3 | 4 | Total |
|---|---|---|---|---|---|
| Panthers | 14 | 0 | 7 | 7 | 28 |
| No. 15 Cardinals | 10 | 9 | 23 | 14 | 56 |

at Gayle and Tom Benson Stadium, San Antonio, Texas

- Date: Saturday October 5, 2024
- Game time: 6:00 p.m.
- Game weather: Clear • Temperature: 92 °F (33 °C) • Wind: NE at 8 miles per hour (13 km/h)
- Game attendance: 2,003
- Referee: Craig Helser
- TV announcers (ESPN+): TBD

Game information

First quarter

- UIW – 9:44 Brack Peacock 37 yard field goal
  UIW 3-0 Drive: 13 plays, 57 yards, 5:16
- PVAMU – 7:06 Shemar Savage 42 yard pass from Jaden Johnson, Guillermo Garcia Rodriguez kick
  PVAMU 7-3 Drive: 5 plays, 65 yards, 2:38
- UIW – 3:22 Jalen Walthall 9 yard pass from Zach Calzada, Brack Peacock kick
  UIW 10-7 Drive: 9 plays, 75 yards, 3:44
- PVAMU – 2:38 Scooter Adams 54 yard pass from Jaden Johnson, Guillermo Garcia Rodriguez kick
  PVAMU 14-10 Drive: 3 plays, 65 yards, 0:44

Second quarter

- UIW – 12:27 Brack Peacock 27 yard field goal
  PVAMU 14-13 Drive: 11 plays, 49 yards, 2:33
- UIW – 6:02 Roy Alexander 7 yard pass from Zach Calzada, Zach Calzada pass failed
  UIW 19-14 Drive: 7 plays, 56 yards, 2:53

Third quarter

- UIW – 10:51 Jalen Walthall 42 yard pass from Zach Calzada, Brack Peacock kick
  UIW 26–14 Drive: 7 plays, 64 yards, 3:08
- PVAMU – 9:27 Trejon Spiller 43 yard pass from Chris Herron, Guillermo Garcia Rodriguez kick
  UIW 26-21 Drive: 5 plays, 73 yards, 1:18
- UIW – 6:10 Dekalon Taylor 14 yard run, Roy Alexander run
  UIW 34-21 Drive: 6 plays, 65 yards, 3:16
- UIW – 1:48 Timothy Carter 5 yard run, Zach Calzada run
  UIW 42-21 Drive: 9 plays, 67 yards, 3:19

Fourth quarter

- UIW – 7:40 Lontrell Turner 2 yard run, Brack Peacock kick
  UIW 49-21 Drive: 5 plays, 28 yards, 2:16
- UIW – 5:17 Dekalon Taylor 62 yard punt return, Brack Peacock kick
  UIW 56-21
- PVAMU – 0:42 Eric Zachery 50 yard interception return, Guillermo Garcia Rodriguez kick
  UIW 56-28

| Statistics | PV | UIW |
|---|---|---|
| First downs | 15 | 30 |
| Total yards | 280 | 516 |
| Rushing yards | 83 | 225 |
| Passing yards | 197 | 291 |
| Passing: Comp–Att–Int | 15–28–0 | 27–36–1 |
| Time of possession | 25:06 | 32:23 |

| Team | Category | Player | Statistics |
|---|---|---|---|
| Prairie View A&M | Passing | Jaden Johnson | 12/24, 149 yards, 2 TD |
| Prairie View A&M | Rushing | Scooter Adams | 6 carries, 39 yards |
| Prairie View A&M | Receiving | Scooter Adams | 1 receptions, 54 yards, TD |
| Incarnate Word | Passing | Zach Calzada | 27/34, 291 yards, 3 TD |
| Incarnate Word | Rushing | Dekalon Taylor | 17 carries, 84 yards, TD |
| Incarnate Word | Receiving | Jalen Walthall | 12 receptions, 170 yards, TD |

=== at Arkansas–Pine Bluff ===
Game Seven – Prairie View A&M Panthers (2–4) vs Arkansas–Pine Bluff Golden Lions (1–4) – Game summary

| Quarter | 1 | 2 | 3 | 4 | Total |
|---|---|---|---|---|---|
| Panthers | 0 | 0 | 0 | 0 | 0 |
| Golden Lions | 0 | 0 | 0 | 0 | 0 |

at Simmons Bank Field, Pine Bluff, Arkansas

- Date: Friday October 11, 2024
- Game time: 8:15 p.m.
- TV announcers (ESPNU): Tiffany Greene (play-by-play) and Jay Walker (analyst)

Game information

First quarter
Second quarter
Third quarter
Fourth quarter

| Statistics | PV | UAPB |
|---|---|---|
| First downs | | |
| Total yards | | |
| Rushing yards | | |
| Passing yards | | |
| Passing: Comp–Att–Int | | |
| Time of possession | | |

| Team | Category | Player | Statistics |
|---|---|---|---|
| Prairie View A&M | Passing | | |
| Prairie View A&M | Rushing | | |
| Prairie View A&M | Receiving | | |
| Arkansas–Pine Bluff | Passing | | |
| Arkansas–Pine Bluff | Rushing | | |
| Arkansas–Pine Bluff | Receiving | | |

=== Texas A&M–Commerce ===
Game Eight – Texas A&M–Commerce Lions (1–6) vs Prairie View A&M Panthers (2–5) – Game summary

| Quarter | 1 | 2 | 3 | 4 | Total |
|---|---|---|---|---|---|
| Lions | 0 | 0 | 0 | 0 | 0 |
| Panthers | 0 | 0 | 0 | 0 | 0 |

at Panther Stadium, Prairie View, Texas

- Date: Saturday October 26, 2024
- Game time: 2:00 p.m.
- TV announcers (ESPN+): TBD

Game information

First quarter
Second quarter
Third quarter
Fourth quarter

| Statistics | TAMC | PV |
|---|---|---|
| First downs | | |
| Total yards | | |
| Rushing yards | | |
| Passing yards | | |
| Passing: Comp–Att–Int | | |
| Time of possession | | |

| Team | Category | Player | Statistics |
|---|---|---|---|
| Texas A&M–Commerce | Passing | | |
| Texas A&M–Commerce | Rushing | | |
| Texas A&M–Commerce | Receiving | | |
| Prairie View A&M | Passing | | |
| Prairie View A&M | Rushing | | |
| Prairie View A&M | Receiving | | |

=== at Mississippi Valley State ===
Game Nine – Prairie View A&M Panthers (3–5) at Mississippi Valley State Delta Devils (0–8) – Game summary

| Quarter | 1 | 2 | 3 | 4 | Total |
|---|---|---|---|---|---|
| Panthers | 0 | 0 | 0 | 0 | 0 |
| Delta Devils | 0 | 0 | 0 | 0 | 0 |

at Rice–Totten Stadium • Itta Bena, MS

- Date: Saturday November 2, 2024
- Game time: 2:00 p.m.
- Game weather: 0 °F (−18 °C)

Game information

First quarter
Second quarter
Third quarter
Fourth quarter

| Statistics | PV | MVSU |
|---|---|---|
| First downs | | |
| Total yards | | |
| Rushing yards | | |
| Passing yards | | |
| Passing: Comp–Att–Int | | |
| Time of possession | | |

| Team | Category | Player | Statistics |
|---|---|---|---|
| Prairie View A&M | Passing | | |
| Prairie View A&M | Rushing | | |
| Prairie View A&M | Receiving | | |
| Mississippi Valley State | Passing | | |
| Mississippi Valley State | Rushing | | |
| Mississippi Valley State | Receiving | | |

=== Florida A&M ===
Game Ten – Florida A&M Rattlers (5–3) vs Prairie View A&M Panthers (4–5) – Game summary

| Quarter | 1 | 2 | 3 | 4 | Total |
|---|---|---|---|---|---|
| Rattlers | 0 | 0 | 0 | 0 | 0 |
| Panthers | 0 | 0 | 0 | 0 | 0 |

at Panther Stadium, Prairie View, TX

- Date: Saturday November 9, 2024
- Game time: 2:00 p.m.
- TV: ESPN+

Game information

First quarter
Second quarter
Third quarter
Fourth quarter

| Statistics | FAMU | PV |
|---|---|---|
| First downs | | |
| Total yards | | |
| Rushing yards | | |
| Passing yards | | |
| Passing: Comp–Att–Int | | |
| Time of possession | | |

| Team | Category | Player | Statistics |
|---|---|---|---|
| Florida A&M | Passing | | |
| Florida A&M | Rushing | | |
| Florida A&M | Receiving | | |
| Prairie View A&M | Passing | | |
| Prairie View A&M | Rushing | | |
| Prairie View A&M | Receiving | | |

=== Alcorn State ===
Game Eleven – Alcorn State Braves (5–5) vs Prairie View A&M Panthers (5–5) – Game summary

| Quarter | 1 | 2 | 3 | 4 | Total |
|---|---|---|---|---|---|
| Braves | 0 | 0 | 0 | 0 | 0 |
| Panthers | 0 | 0 | 0 | 0 | 0 |

at Panther Stadium, Prairie View, TX

- Date: Saturday November 16, 2024
- Game time: 2:00 p.m.
- TV: ESPN+

Game information

First quarter
Second quarter
Third quarter
Fourth quarter

| Statistics | ALCN | PV |
|---|---|---|
| First downs | | |
| Total yards | | |
| Rushing yards | | |
| Passing yards | | |
| Passing: Comp–Att–Int | | |
| Time of possession | | |

| Team | Category | Player | Statistics |
|---|---|---|---|
| Alcorn State | Passing | | |
| Alcorn State | Rushing | | |
| Alcorn State | Receiving | | |
| Prairie View A&M | Passing | | |
| Prairie View A&M | Rushing | | |
| Prairie View A&M | Receiving | | |

=== at Alabama State ===
Game Twelve – Prairie View A&M Panthers (5–6) vs Alabama State Hornets (5–5) – Game summary

| Quarter | 1 | 2 | 3 | 4 | Total |
|---|---|---|---|---|---|
| Panthers | 0 | 0 | 0 | 0 | 0 |
| Hornets | 0 | 0 | 0 | 0 | 0 |

at ASU Stadium, Montgomery, AL

- Date: Saturday November 23, 2024
- Game time: 2:00 PM CST
- TV: ESPN+

Game information

First quarter
Second quarter
Third quarter
Fourth quarter

| Statistics | PV | ALST |
|---|---|---|
| First downs | | |
| Total yards | | |
| Rushing yards | | |
| Passing yards | | |
| Passing: Comp–Att–Int | | |
| Time of possession | | |

| Team | Category | Player | Statistics |
|---|---|---|---|
| Prairie View A&M | Passing | | |
| Prairie View A&M | Rushing | | |
| Prairie View A&M | Receiving | | |
| Alabama State | Passing | | |
| Alabama State | Rushing | | |
| Alabama State | Receiving | | |
