= 2024 Grambling State Tigers football team =

American college football season

2024 Grambling State Tigers football
- Conference: Southwestern Athletic Conference
- West Division
- Record: 5–7 (2–6 SWAC)
- Head coach: Mickey Joseph (1st season)
- Offensive coordinator: Eric Dooley (5th season)
- Defensive coordinator: Jason Rollins (1st season)
- Home stadium: Eddie G. Robinson Memorial Stadium

2024 Southwestern Athletic Conference football standings
	Conf.			Overall
Team	W		L	W		L
East Division
No. 18 Jackson State xy$	8	–	1	12	–	2
Florida A&M	5	–	3	7	–	5
Alabama State	5	–	3	7	–	5
Alabama A&M	4	–	4	6	–	6
Bethune–Cookman	2	–	6	2	–	10
Mississippi Valley State	1	–	7	1	–	11
West Division
Southern xy	7	–	2	8	–	5
Alcorn State	5	–	3	6	–	6
Texas Southern	4	–	4	5	–	6
Prairie View A&M	3	–	5	5	–	7
Grambling State	2	–	6	5	–	7
Arkansas–Pine Bluff	2	–	6	3	–	9
Championship: Jackson State 41, Southern 13
$ – Conference champion; x – Division champion/co-champions; y – Championship game participant; Rankings from STATS Poll

The 2024 Grambling State Tigers football team represented Grambling State University as a member of the Southwestern Athletic Conference (SWAC) during the 2024 NCAA Division I FCS football season. The Tigers were coached by first-year head coach Mickey Joseph and played at Eddie G. Robinson Memorial Stadium in Grambling, Louisiana.

== Schedule ==
Date	Time	Opponent	Site	TV	Result	Attendance
August 31	7:00 p.m.	at Louisiana*	Cajun Field; Lafayette, LA	ESPN+	L 10–40	23,107
September 7	6:00 p.m.	Tuskegee*	Eddie G. Robinson Memorial Stadium; Grambling, LA	HBCU Go	W 37–20	9,247
September 14	6:00 p.m.	at Texas A&M–Commerce (Note: On November 7, 2024, Texas A&M University–Commerce changed its name to East Texas A&M University.)*	Ernest Hawkins Field at Memorial Stadium; Commerce, TX	ESPN+	W 35–28 ^{OT}	5,944
September 21	6:00 p.m.	Jackson State* (Note: The game against Jackson State, a fellow member of the SWAC, was played as a non-conference game and did not count in the league standings.)	Eddie G. Robinson Memorial Stadium; Grambling, LA	ESPN+	W 41–20	19,085
September 28	6:00 p.m.	vs. Prairie View A&M	Cotton Bowl; Dallas, TX (State Fair Classic)	ESPN+	L 34–36 ^{5OT}	52,323
October 12	2:00 p.m.	Alcorn State	Eddie G. Robinson Memorial Stadium; Grambling, LA	ESPN+	L 15–17	7,580
October 19	2:00 p.m.	Arkansas–Pine Bluff^{†}	Eddie G. Robinson Memorial Stadium; Grambling, LA	HBCU Go	W 31–21	17,135
October 26	6:00 p.m.	at Texas Southern	Shell Energy Stadium; Houston, TX	SWAC Digital	L 17–24	10,029
November 2	2:00 p.m.	at Bethune–Cookman	Daytona Stadium; Daytona Beach, FL	SWAC Digital	L 21–24	5,103
November 9	2:00 p.m.	Alabama State	Eddie G. Robinson Memorial Stadium; Grambling, LA	ESPN+	W 24–23	3,621
November 14	7:00 p.m.	at Alabama A&M	Louis Crews Stadium; Huntsville, AL	ESPNU	L 17–22	3,595
November 30	1:00 p.m.	vs. Southern	Caesars Superdome; New Orleans, LA (Bayou Classic)	NBC	L 14–24	63,207
*Non-conference game; ^{†}Homecoming; All times are in Central time

== Game summaries ==
=== at Louisiana (FBS) ===
Game One – Grambling State Tigers (0–0) at Louisiana Ragin' Cajuns (FBS) (0–0) – Game summary

Quarter	1	2	3	4	Total
Tigers	0	0	7	3	10
Ragin' Cajuns (FBS)	7	23	7	3	40

at Cajun Field • Lafayette, Louisiana

- Date: Saturday August 31, 2024
- Game time: 7:00 p.m. CDT
- Game weather: Sunny
- Game attendance: 23,107
- Referee: Ted Pitts
- TV announcers (ESPN+): Dan McDonald (play-by-play) and Eric Mouton (analyst)

Game information

First quarter

- (9:04) UL – Dre'lyn Washington 6-yard run, Kenneth Almendares kick (Drive: 8 plays, 82 yards, 3:24; Louisiana 7–0)

Second quarter

- (13:30) UL – Harvey Broussard 13-yard pass from Ben Wooldridge, Kenneth Almendares kick (Drive: 12 plays, 69 yards, 6:50; Louisiana 14–0)
- (10:07) UL – Caleb Kibodi 50-yard interception, Kenneth Almendares kick (Louisiana 21–0)
- (4:06) UL – Tavion Smith 56-yard pass from Ben Wooldridge (Drive: 6 plays, 89 yards, 2:59; Louisiana 27–0)
- (0:39) UL – Kenneth Almendares 41-yard field goal (Drive: 6 plays, 24 yards, 1:09; Louisiana 30–0)

Third quarter

- (8:46) UL – Terrance Carter 10-yard pass from Ben Wooldridge, Kenneth Almendares kick (Drive: 7 plays, 79 yards, 3:00; Louisiana 37–0)
- (4:35) GSU – Ke'Travion Hargrove 1-yard run, Reed Harradine kick (Drive: 9 plays, 75 yards, 4:11; Louisiana 37–7)
- (3:33) UL – Tony Sterner 27-yard field goal (Drive: 10 plays, 70 yards, 5:52; Louisiana 40–7)

Fourth quarter

- (1:55) GSU – Reed Harradine 50-yard field goal (Drive: 5 plays, 32 yards, 1:26; Louisiana 40–10)

Statistics	GRAM	ULL
First downs	12	24
Plays–yards	48–241	66–481
Rushes–yards	20–75	28–118
Passing yards	166	363
Passing: Comp–Att–Int	19–28–1	29–38–1
Time of possession	25:42	34:18

Team	Category	Player	Statistics
Grambling State	Passing	Myles Crawley	19/28, 166 yards, INT
Grambling State	Rushing	Ke'Travion Hargrove	12 carries, 61 yards, TD
Grambling State	Receiving	Nick Howard	5 receptions, 68 yards
Louisiana	Passing	Ben Wooldridge	25/33, 308 yards, 3 TD, INT
Louisiana	Rushing	Zylan Perry	5 carries, 45 yards
Louisiana	Receiving	Harvey Broussard	4 receptions, 76 yards, TD

=== Tuskegee (DII) ===
Game Two – Tuskegee Golden Tigers (DII) (0–1) at Grambling State Tigers (0–1) – Game summary

Quarter	1	2	3	4	Total
Golden Tigers (DII)	0	3	7	10	20
Tigers	13	24	0	0	37

at Eddie G. Robinson Memorial Stadium, Grambling, LA

- Date: Saturday September 7, 2024
- Game time: 6:00 p.m.
- Game weather: Sunny
- Game attendance: 9,247
- Referee: Preston Clipper
- TV announcers (HBCU Go): Charles Neal (play-by-play)

Game information

First quarter

- (11:44) GSU – Covadis Knighten 2-yard pass from Myles Crawley (Drive: 3 plays, 18 yards, 1:10; Grambling State 6–0)
- (8:38) GSU – Nick Howard 9-yard pass from Myles Crawley, Reed Harradine kick (Drive: 5 plays, 72 yards, 2:08; Grambling State 13–0)

Second quarter

- (13:27) GSU – Tony Phillips 4-yard pass from Myles Crawley, Reed Harradine kick (Drive: 4 plays, 35 yards, 2:13; Grambling State 20–0)
- (2:38) GSU – Reed Harradine 36-yard field goal (Drive: 11 plays, 61 yards, 5:06; Grambling State 23–0)
- (1:32) GSU – Javon Robinson 53-yard pass from Myles Crawley, Reed Harradine kick (Drive: 1 play, 53 yards, 0:11; Grambling State 30–0)
- (0:28) GSU – Josh Darling 45-yard fumble recovery, Reed Harradine kick (Grambling State 37–0)
- (0:00) TUSK – Lorcan Ryans 36-yard field goal (Drive: 4 plays, 56 yards, 0:28; Grambling State 37–3)

Third quarter

- (12:25) TUSK – Johnny Morris 13-yard run, Lorcan Ryans kick (Drive: 8 plays, 75 yards, 2:35; Grambling State 37–10)

Fourth quarter

- (4:48) TUSK – Lorcan Ryans 47-yard field goal (Drive: 5 plays, 40 yards, 2:59; Grambling State 37–13)
- (0:35) TUSK – Rodricus Magee 15-yard pass from Raequan Beal, Lorcan Ryans kick (Drive: 7 plays, 63 yards, 2:34; Grambling State 37–20)

Statistics	TUSK	GRAM
First downs	23	14
Total yards	380	384
Rushing yards	105	62
Passing yards	275	322
Passing: Comp–Att–Int	21–39–2	18–30–0
Time of possession	30:25	29:35

Team	Category	Player	Statistics
Tuskegee	Passing	Christopher Roberson	13/28, 193 yards, 2 INT
Tuskegee	Rushing	Johnny Morris	12 carries, 51 yards, TD
Tuskegee	Receiving	Gabriel Garmon	5 receptions, 116 yards
Grambling State	Passing	Myles Crawley	16/26, 304 yards, 4 TD
Grambling State	Rushing	Tre Bradford	13 carries, 52 yards
Grambling State	Receiving	Javon Robinson	4 receptions, 151 yards, TD

=== at Texas A&M–Commerce ===
Game Three – Grambling State Tigers (1–1) at Texas A&M–Commerce Lions (0–2) – Game summary

Quarter	1	2	3	4	OT	Total
Tigers	6	15	0	7	7	35
Lions	7	14	7	0	0	28

at Ernest Hawkins Field at Memorial Stadium, Commerce, Texas

- Date: Saturday September 14, 2024
- Game time: 6:00 p.m. CDT
- Game weather: Sunny, 91 °F (33 °C)
- Game attendance: 5,944
- Referee: Ed Bourgeois
- TV: ESPN+

Game information

First quarter

- GRAM – Blake Davis 35-yard fumble return (kick blocked), 6:43. Tigers 6–0.
- AMC – B. K. Jackson 69-yard run (Luke Jackson kick), 6:02. Lions 7–6. Drive: 2 plays, 75 yards, 0:41.

Second quarter

- GRAM – Jacoby Bellazar 10-yard pass from Myles Crawley (Myles Crawley pass to Jacoby Bellazar), 12:56. Tigers 14–7. Drive: 3 plays, 17 yards, 1:15.
- AMC – B. K. Jackson 9-yard run (Luke Jackson kick), 7:27. Tied 14–14. Drive: 10 plays, 65 yards, 5:29.
- AMC – JaiSean McMillian 5-yard run (Luke Jackson kick), 4:41. Lions 21–14. Drive: 3 plays, 45 yards, 1:09.
- GRAM – Tre Bradford 41-yard run (Reed Harradine kick), 4:17. Tied 21–21. Drive: 1 play, 41 yards, 0:12.

Third quarter

- AMC – Braxton Garmon 3-yard run (Luke Jackson kick), 8:56. Lions 28–21. Drive: 7 plays, 44 yards, 4:03.

Fourth quarter

- GRAM – Nicholas Howard 27-yard pass from Myles Crawley (Reed Harradine kick), 1:18. Tied 28–28. Drive: 6 plays, 75 yards, 2:26.

Overtime

- GRAM – Tre Bradford 3-yard run (Reed Harradine kick). Tigers 35–28. Drive: 5 plays, 25 yards.

Statistics	GRAM	TAMC
First downs	13	19
Total yards	247	419
Rushing yards	117	267
Passing yards	130	152
Turnovers	3	6
Time of possession	25:45	34:15

Team	Category	Player	Statistics
Grambling State	Passing	Myles Crawley	14/30, 125 yards, 2 TD, 2 INT
Grambling State	Rushing	Tre Bradford	15 rushes, 70 yards, 2 TD
Grambling State	Receiving	Covadis Knighten	4 receptions, 29 yards
Texas A&M–Commerce	Passing	Ron Peace	14/28, 152 yards, 4 INT
Texas A&M–Commerce	Rushing	B. K. Jackson	16 rushes, 149 yards, 2 TD
Texas A&M–Commerce	Receiving	Christian Jourdain	4 receptions, 57 yards

=== Jackson State ===
Game Four – Jackson State Tigers (2–1) at Grambling State Tigers (2–1) – Game summary

Quarter	1	2	3	4	Total
Jackson State	0	0	0	0	0
Grambling State	0	0	0	0	0

at Eddie G. Robinson Memorial Stadium, Grambling, LA

- Date: Saturday September 21, 2024
- Game time: 6:00 p.m.
- TV: ESPN+

Game information

First quarter
Second quarter
Third quarter
Fourth quarter

Statistics	JKST	GRAM
First downs		
Total yards		
Rushing yards		
Passing yards		
Passing: Comp–Att–Int		
Time of possession		

Team	Category	Player	Statistics
Jackson State	Passing		
Jackson State	Rushing		
Jackson State	Receiving		
Grambling State	Passing		
Grambling State	Rushing		
Grambling State	Receiving		

=== vs. Prairie View A&M (State Fair Classic) ===
Game Five – Grambling State Tigers (3–1) vs Prairie View A&M Panthers (1–3) – Game summary

Quarter	1	2	3	4	Total
Tigers	0	0	0	0	0
Panthers	0	0	0	0	0

at Cotton Bowl, Dallas, Texas

- Date: Saturday September 28, 2024
- Game time: 6:00 p.m.
- TV announcers (ESPN+): TBD

Game information

First quarter
Second quarter
Third quarter
Fourth quarter

Statistics	GRAM	PV
First downs		
Total yards		
Rushing yards		
Passing yards		
Passing: Comp–Att–Int		
Time of possession		

Team	Category	Player	Statistics
Grambling State	Passing		
Grambling State	Rushing		
Grambling State	Receiving		
Prairie View A&M	Passing		
Prairie View A&M	Rushing		
Prairie View A&M	Receiving		

=== Alcorn State ===
Game Six – Alcorn State Braves (3–3) at Grambling State Tigers (3–2) – Game summary

Quarter	1	2	3	4	Total
Braves	0	0	0	0	0
Tigers	0	0	0	0	0

at Eddie G. Robinson Memorial Stadium, Grambling, LA

- Date: Saturday October 12, 2024
- Game time: 2:00 p.m.
- TV: ESPN+

Game information

First quarter
Second quarter
Third quarter
Fourth quarter

Statistics	ALCN	GRAM
First downs		
Total yards		
Rushing yards		
Passing yards		
Passing: Comp–Att–Int		
Time of possession		

Team	Category	Player	Statistics
Alcorn State	Passing		
Alcorn State	Rushing		
Alcorn State	Receiving		
Grambling State	Passing		
Grambling State	Rushing		
Grambling State	Receiving		

=== Arkansas–Pine Bluff ===
Game Seven – Arkansas–Pine Bluff Golden Lions (2–4) at Grambling State Tigers (3–3) – Game summary

Quarter	1	2	3	4	Total
Golden Lions	0	0	0	0	0
Tigers	0	0	0	0	0

at Eddie G. Robinson Memorial Stadium, Grambling, LA

- Date: Saturday October 19, 2024
- Game time: 2:00 p.m.
- TV: HBCU Go

Game information

First quarter
Second quarter
Third quarter
Fourth quarter

Statistics	UAPB	GRAM
First downs		
Total yards		
Rushing yards		
Passing yards		
Passing: Comp–Att–Int		
Time of possession		

Team	Category	Player	Statistics
Arkansas–Pine Bluff	Passing		
Arkansas–Pine Bluff	Rushing		
Arkansas–Pine Bluff	Receiving		
Grambling State	Passing		
Grambling State	Rushing		
Grambling State	Receiving		

=== at Texas Southern ===
Game Eight – Grambling State Tigers (4–3) vs Texas Southern Tigers (2–4) – Game summary

Quarter	1	2	3	4	Total
Grambling State	0	0	0	0	0
Texas Southern	0	0	0	0	0

at Shell Energy Stadium, Houston, TX

- Date: Saturday October 26, 2024
- Game time: 6:00 p.m.
- TV announcers (SWAC Digital): TBD

Game information

First quarter
Second quarter
Third quarter
Fourth quarter

Statistics	GRAM	TXSO
First downs		
Total yards		
Rushing yards		
Passing yards		
Passing: Comp–Att–Int		
Time of possession		

Team	Category	Player	Statistics
Grambling State	Passing		
Grambling State	Rushing		
Grambling State	Receiving		
Texas Southern	Passing		
Texas Southern	Rushing		
Texas Southern	Receiving		

=== at Bethune–Cookman ===
Game Nine – Grambling State Tigers (4–4) at Bethune–Cookman Wildcats (1–7) – Game summary

Quarter	1	2	3	4	Total
Tigers	0	0	0	0	0
Wildcats	0	0	0	0	0

at Daytona Stadium • Daytona Beach, FL

- Date: Saturday November 2, 2024
- Game time: 2:00 p.m.
- Game weather: 0 °F (−18 °C)
- TV: HBCU GO

Game information

First quarter
Second quarter
Third quarter
Fourth quarter

Statistics	GRAM	BCU
First downs		
Total yards		
Rushing yards		
Passing yards		
Passing: Comp–Att–Int		
Time of possession		

Team	Category	Player	Statistics
Grambling State	Passing		
Grambling State	Rushing		
Grambling State	Receiving		
Bethune–Cookman	Passing		
Bethune–Cookman	Rushing		
Bethune–Cookman	Receiving		

=== Alabama State ===
Game Ten – Alabama State Hornets (5–3) at Grambling State Tigers (4–5) – Game summary

Quarter	1	2	3	4	Total
Hornets	0	0	0	0	0
Tigers	0	0	0	0	0

at Eddie G. Robinson Memorial Stadium • Grambling, LA

- Date: Saturday November 9, 2024
- Game time: 2:00 p.m.
- Game weather: 0 °F (−18 °C)
- TV: ESPN+

Game information

First quarter
Second quarter
Third quarter
Fourth quarter

Statistics	ALST	GRAM
First downs		
Total yards		
Rushing yards		
Passing yards		
Passing: Comp–Att–Int		
Time of possession		

Team	Category	Player	Statistics
Alabama State	Passing		
Alabama State	Rushing		
Alabama State	Receiving		
Grambling State	Passing		
Grambling State	Rushing		
Grambling State	Receiving		

=== at Alabama A&M ===
Game Eleven – Grambling State Tigers (5–5) at Alabama A&M Bulldogs (4–5) – Game summary

Quarter	1	2	3	4	Total
Tigers	3	14	0	0	17
Bulldogs	3	3	13	3	22

at Louis Crews Stadium • Huntsville, AL

- Date: Thursday November 14, 2024
- Game time: 7:00 p.m.
- Game weather: Cloudy • Temperature: 55 °F (13 °C) • Wind: NW 6 miles per hour (9.7 km/h)
- Game attendance: 3,595
- Referee: Y. N. Myers III
- TV announcers (ESPNU): Tiffany Greene (play-by-play) and Jay Walker (analyst)

Game information

First quarter

- (8:31) GSU – Reed Harradine 23-yard field goal (Drive: 6 plays, 77 yards, 2:17; Grambling State 3–0)
- (2:12) AAM – Victor Barbosa 45-yard field goal (Drive: 13 plays, 47 yards, 6:19; Tied 3–3)

Second quarter

- (12:06) GSU – Andrew Jones 30-yard fumble recovery, Reed Harradine kick (Grambling State 10–3)
- (7:24) GSU – JR Waters 10-yard pass from Myles Crawley, Reed Harradine kick (Drive: 5 plays, 60 yards, 2:45; Grambling State 17–3)
- (0:00) AAM – Victor Barbosa 38-yard field goal (Drive: 7 plays, 74 yards, 0:56; Grambling State 17–6)

Third quarter

- (13:46) AAM – Keenan Hambrick 34-yard pass from Cornelious Brown, Cornelious Brown rush (Drive: 1 play, 34 yards, 0:03; Grambling State 17–14)
- (7:04) AAM – Victor Barbosa 44-yard field goal (Drive: 11 plays, 47 yards, 4:07; Tied 17–17)
- (0:46) AAM – 0-yard safety (Alabama A&M 19–17)

Fourth quarter

- (7:20) AAM – Victor Barbosa 19-yard field goal (Drive: 14 plays, 80 yards, 8:18; Alabama A&M 22–17)

Statistics	GRAM	AAMU
First downs	12	27
Total yards	263	388
Rushing yards	94	160
Passing yards	169	228
Passing: Comp–Att–Int	12–29–2	20–35–0
Time of possession	23:21	36:39

Team	Category	Player	Statistics
Grambling State	Passing	Myles Crawley	12/27, 169 yards, TD, 2 INT
Grambling State	Rushing	Ke'Travion Hargrove	8 carries, 38 yards
Grambling State	Receiving	Jalen Johnson	1 reception, 67 yards
Alabama A&M	Passing	Cornelious Brown	20/35, 228 yards, TD
Alabama A&M	Rushing	Donovan Eaglin	25 carries, 123 yards
Alabama A&M	Receiving	Keenan Hambrick	8 receptions, 99 yards, TD

=== vs. Southern (Bayou Classic) ===
Game Twelve – Southern Jaguars (7–4) vs. Grambling State Tigers (5–6) – Game summary

Quarter	1	2	3	4	Total
Jaguars	0	0	0	0	0
Tigers	0	0	0	0	0

at Caesars Superdome • New Orleans, LA

- Date: Saturday November 30, 2024
- Game time: 1:00 p.m.
- Game weather: 0 °F (−18 °C)
- TV: NBC

Game information

First quarter
Second quarter
Third quarter
Fourth quarter

Statistics	SOU	GRAM
First downs		
Total yards		
Rushing yards		
Passing yards		
Passing: Comp–Att–Int		
Time of possession		

Team	Category	Player	Statistics
Southern	Passing		
Southern	Rushing		
Southern	Receiving		
Grambling State	Passing		
Grambling State	Rushing		
Grambling State	Receiving		
