= 2024 Southern Jaguars football team =

American college football season

2024 Southern Jaguars football
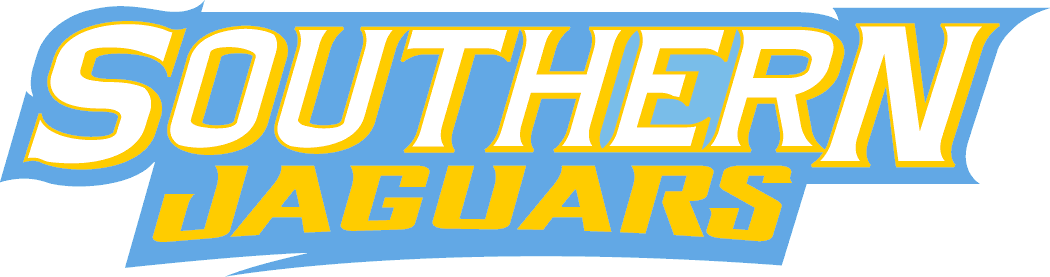

SWAC West Division champion

SWAC Championship Game, L 13–41 vs Jackson State
- Conference: Southwestern Athletic Conference
- West Division
- Record: 8–5 (7–1 SWAC)
- Head coach: Terrence Graves (1st season)
- Offensive coordinator: Mark Frederick (1st season)
- Defensive coordinator: Henry Miller (1st season)
- Home stadium: A. W. Mumford Stadium

2024 Southwestern Athletic Conference football standings
	Conf.			Overall
Team	W		L	W		L
East Division
No. 18 Jackson State xy$	8	–	1	12	–	2
Florida A&M	5	–	3	7	–	5
Alabama State	5	–	3	7	–	5
Alabama A&M	4	–	4	6	–	6
Bethune–Cookman	2	–	6	2	–	10
Mississippi Valley State	1	–	7	1	–	11
West Division
Southern xy	7	–	2	8	–	5
Alcorn State	5	–	3	6	–	6
Texas Southern	4	–	4	5	–	6
Prairie View A&M	3	–	5	5	–	7
Grambling State	2	–	6	5	–	7
Arkansas–Pine Bluff	2	–	6	3	–	9
Championship: Jackson State 41, Southern 13
$ – Conference champion; x – Division champion/co-champions; y – Championship game participant; Rankings from STATS Poll

The 2024 Southern Jaguars football team represented Southern University as a member of the Southwestern Athletic Conference (SWAC) during the 2024 NCAA Division I FCS football season. The Jaguars are coached by first-year head coach Terrence Graves and play at A. W. Mumford Stadium in Baton Rouge, Louisiana.

== Schedule ==
Date	Time	Opponent	Site	TV	Result	Attendance
August 31	7:00 p.m.	at McNeese*	Cowboy Stadium; Lake Charles, LA	ESPN+	L 7–21	17,040
September 7	6:00 p.m.	Savannah State*	A. W. Mumford Stadium; Baton Rouge, LA	TheGrio	W 42–10	15,267
September 14	6:00 p.m.	at Jackson State* ^{[note 1]}	Mississippi Veterans Memorial Stadium; Jackson, MS (rivalry)	ESPN+	L 15–33	32,027
September 21	6:00 p.m.	at Prairie View A&M	Panther Stadium; Prairie View, TX	ESPN+	W 31–24 ^{OT}	9,880
October 5	6:00 p.m.	Nicholls*	A. W. Mumford Stadium; Baton Rouge, LA	Jaguar Sports Network	L 7–51	17,179
October 12	6:00 p.m.	at Texas Southern	Shell Energy Stadium; Houston, TX	YouTube	W 22–19 ^{OT}	14,007
October 19	6:00 p.m.	Alcorn State^{†}	A. W. Mumford Stadium; Baton Rouge, LA	ESPN+	W 24–14	26,685
October 26	6:00 p.m.	at Florida A&M	Bragg Memorial Stadium; Tallahassee, FL	ESPN+	L 6–24	N/A
November 2	2:00 p.m.	at Alabama A&M	Louis Crews Stadium; Huntsville, AL	HBCU GO	W 25–20	8,391
November 9	2:00 p.m.	Bethune–Cookman	A. W. Mumford Stadium; Baton Rouge, LA	Jaguar Sports Network	W 25–23 ^{5OT}	15,443
November 16	2:00 p.m.	Arkansas–Pine Bluff	A. W. Mumford Stadium; Baton Rouge, LA	Jaguar Sports Network	W 31–9	17,740
November 30	1:00 p.m.	vs. Grambling State	Caesars Superdome; New Orleans, LA (Bayou Classic)	NBC	W 24–14	63,207
December 7	2:00 p.m.	at No. 18 Jackson State	Mississippi Veterans Memorial Stadium; Jackson, MS (SWAC Championship / rivalry)	ESPN2	L 13–41	23,765
*Non-conference game; ^{†}Homecoming; Rankings from STATS Poll released prior to the game; All times are in Central time

^{[note 1]} The regular-season game against Jackson State, a fellow member of the SWAC, was played as a non-conference game and did not count in conference standings.

== Game summaries ==
=== at McNeese ===
Game One – Southern Jaguars (0–0) vs McNeese Cowboys (0–1) – Game summary

Quarter	1	2	3	4	Total
Jaguars	0	7	0	0	7
Cowboys	0	0	0	21	21

at Cowboy Stadium, Lake Charles, Louisiana

- Date: Saturday August 31, 2024
- Game time: 7:00 p.m.
- Game weather: Cloudy • Temperature: 83 °F (28 °C) • Wind: E at 14 miles per hour (23 km/h)
- Game attendance: 17,040
- Referee: Edward Bourgeois
- TV announcers (ESPN+): Jeff Palermo (play-by-play) and Chaston Tavaras (analyst)

Game information

First quarter

No scoring plays

Second quarter

- (6:44) SU – Barry Remo 1-yard run, Joshua Griffin kick (Drive: 8 plays, 32 yards, 3:35; Southern 7–0)

Third quarter

No scoring plays

Fourth quarter

- (11:00) MCN – Clifton McDowell 6-yard run, Tyler Larco kick (Drive: 2 plays, 6 yards, 0:39; Tied 7–7)
- (9:24) MCN – Clifton McDowell 1-yard run, Tyler Larco kick (Drive: 3 plays, 2 yards, 0:55; McNeese 14–7)
- (5:04) MCN – D'Angelo Durham 2-yard run, Tyler Larco kick (Drive: 6 plays, 70 yards, 3:23; McNeese 21–7)

Statistics	SOU	MCN
First downs	16	13
Total yards	198	272
Rushing yards	66	164
Passing yards	132	108
Passing: Comp–Att–Int	13–29–1	10–23–0
Time of possession	31:28	28:32

Team	Category	Player	Statistics
Southern	Passing	Noah Bodden	12/26, 118 yards, INT
Southern	Rushing	Kobe Dillion	14 carries, 51 yards
Southern	Receiving	Jermaine Minor Jr.	2 receptions, 37 yards
McNeese	Passing	Kamden Sixkiller	9/19, 80 yards
McNeese	Rushing	D'Angelo Durham	13 carries, 65 yards, TD
McNeese	Receiving	Jer'Michael Carter	1 reception, 28 yards

=== Savannah State (DII) ===
Game Two – Savannah State Tigers (DII) (0–0) vs Southern Jaguars (0–1) – Game summary

Quarter	1	2	3	4	Total
Tigers (DII)	7	0	3	0	10
Jaguars	3	13	7	19	42

at A. W. Mumford Stadium, Baton Rouge, Louisiana

- Date: Saturday September 7, 2024
- Game time: 6:00 p.m.
- Game weather: Sunny • Temperature: 87 °F (31 °C)
- Game attendance: 15,267
- Referee: Jarvis Walker
- TV announcers (TheGrio): TBD

Game information

First quarter

- (2:55) SOU – Joshua Griffin 44-yard field goal (Drive: 10 plays, 72 yards, 4:38; Southern 3–0)
- (1:52) SAV – Jadon Adams 81-yard run, Jimmy Mal kick (Drive: 2 plays, 87 yards, 0:59; Savannah State 7–3)

Second quarter

- (10:30) SOU – Joshua Griffin 38-yard field goal (Drive: 14 plays, 57 yards, 6:14; Savannah State 7–6)
- (1:55) SOU – Joshua Griffin 49-yard field goal (Drive: 14 plays, 43 yards, 7:00; Southern 9–7)
- (1:10) SOU – Chandler Whitfield 38-yard pass from Czavian Teasett, Joshua Griffin kick (Drive: 3 plays, 38 yards, 0:19; Southern 16–7)

Third quarter

- (6:10) SAV – Jimmy Mal 33-yard field goal (Drive: 4 plays, 4 yards, 1:34; Southern 16–10)
- (3:35) SOU – Dupree Fuller 31-yard pass from Czavian Teasett, Joshua Griffin kick (Drive: 6 plays, 77 yards, 2:26; Southern 23–10)

Fourth quarter

- (13:40) SOU – Kendric Rhymes 4-yard run (Drive: 9 plays, 58 yards, 3:10; Southern 29–10)
- (8:25) SOU – Darren Morris 33-yard pass from Czavian Teasett (Drive: 7 plays, 40 yards, 3:15; Southern 35–10)
- (0:14) SOU – Barry Remo 1-yard run, Joshua Griffin kick (Drive: 4 plays, 80 yards, 1:56; Southern 42–10)

Statistics	SAV	SOU
First downs	1	28
Total yards	65	554
Rushing yards	50	191
Passing yards	15	363
Passing: Comp–Att–Int	7–16–0	21–39–1
Time of possession	17:47	39:38

Team	Category	Player	Statistics
Savannah State	Passing	Jadon Adams	7/16, 15 yards
Savannah State	Rushing	Jadon Adams	7 carries, 81 yards, TD
Savannah State	Receiving	Da'Shun Mitchell	1 reception, 8 yards
Southern	Passing	Czavian Teasett	17/29, 316 yards, 3 TD
Southern	Rushing	Kobe Dillion	13 carries, 52 yards
Southern	Receiving	Darren Morris	6 receptions, 77 yards, TD

=== at Jackson State (rivalry) ===
Game Three – Southern Jaguars (1–1) vs Jackson State Tigers (1–1) – Game summary

Quarter	1	2	3	4	Total
Jaguars	0	3	6	6	15
Tigers	10	13	10	0	33

at Mississippi Veterans Memorial Stadium, Jackson, Mississippi

- Date: Saturday September 14, 2024
- Game time: 6:00 p.m.
- Game weather: Sunny
- Game attendance: 32,027
- Referee: Preston Clipper
- TV announcers (ESPN+): Santoria Black (play-by-play) and Mo Carter (analyst)

Game information

First quarter

- (12:35) JKST – Gerardo Baeza 25-yard field goal (Drive: 8 plays, 58 yards, 2:19; Jackson State 3–0)
- (3:50) JKST – J. D. Martin 1-yard run, Gerardo Baeza kick (Drive: 11 plays, 72 yards, 4:59; Jackson State 10–0)

Second quarter

- (14:18) JKST – Marvin Landy 30-yard pass from Jacobian Morgan (Drive: 5 plays, 59 yards, 2:06; Jackson State 16–0)
- (2:49) JKST – Ahmad Miller 30-yard run, Gerardo Baeza kick (Drive: 3 plays, 52 yards, 0:52; Jackson State 23–0)
- (0:36) SOU – Joshua Griffin 29-yard field goal (Drive: 9 plays, 63 yards, 2:13; Jackson State 23–3)

Third quarter

- (9:21) JKST – Gerardo Baeza 39-yard field goal (Drive: 6 plays, 35 yards, 3:11; Jackson State 26–3)
- (6:10) SOU – CJ Russell 3-yard run (Drive: 6 plays, 75 yards, 3:11; Jackson State 26–9)
- (2:23) JKST – Irv Mulligan 5-yard run, Gerardo Baeza kick (Drive: 7 plays, 66 yards, 3:37; Jackson State 33–9)

Fourth quarter

- (7:31) SOU – Jermaine Minor Jr. 16-yard pass from Noah Bodden (Drive: 7 plays, 97 yards, 2:49; Jackson State 33–15)

Statistics	SOU	JKST
First downs	18	19
Total yards	416	399
Rushing yards	29	201
Passing yards	387	198
Passing: Comp–Att–Int	23–39–2	14–25–0
Time of possession	28:45	31:15

Team	Category	Player	Statistics
Southern	Passing	Noah Bodden	17/29, 352 yards, TD, 2 INT
Southern	Rushing	Kendric Rhymes	8 carries, 18 yards
Southern	Receiving	Tyler Kirkwood	3 receptions, 121 yards
Jackson State	Passing	Jacobian Morgan	12/21, 153 yards, TD
Jackson State	Rushing	Irv Mulligan	13 carries, 51 yards, TD
Jackson State	Receiving	Joanes Fortilien	3 receptions, 60 yards

=== at Prairie View A&M ===
Game Four – Southern Jaguars (1–2) vs Prairie View A&M Panthers (1–2) – Game summary

Quarter	1	2	3	4	Total
Jaguars	0	0	0	0	0
Panthers	0	0	0	0	0

at Panther Stadium, Prairie View, Texas

- Date: Saturday September 21, 2024
- Game time: 6:00 p.m.
- TV announcers (ESPN+): TBD

Game information

First quarter
Second quarter
Third quarter
Fourth quarter

Statistics	SOU	PV
First downs		
Total yards		
Rushing yards		
Passing yards		
Passing: Comp–Att–Int		
Time of possession		

Team	Category	Player	Statistics
Southern	Passing		
Southern	Rushing		
Southern	Receiving		
Prairie View A&M	Passing		
Prairie View A&M	Rushing		
Prairie View A&M	Receiving		

=== Nicholls ===
Game Five – Nicholls Colonels (1–3) vs Southern Jaguars (2–2) – Game summary

Quarter	1	2	3	4	Total
Colonels	0	0	0	0	0
Jaguars	0	0	0	0	0

at A. W. Mumford Stadium, Baton Rouge, Louisiana

- Date: Saturday October 5, 2024
- Game time: 6:00 p.m.
- TV announcers (Jaguar Sports Network): TBD

Game information

First quarter
Second quarter
Third quarter
Fourth quarter

Statistics	NICH	SOU
First downs		
Total yards		
Rushing yards		
Passing yards		
Passing: Comp–Att–Int		
Time of possession		

Team	Category	Player	Statistics
Nicholls	Passing		
Nicholls	Rushing		
Nicholls	Receiving		
Southern	Passing		
Southern	Rushing		
Southern	Receiving		

=== at Texas Southern ===
Game Six – Southern Jaguars (2–3) vs Texas Southern Tigers (2–3) – Game summary

Quarter	1	2	3	4	Total
Jaguars	0	0	0	0	0
Tigers	0	0	0	0	0

at Shell Energy Stadium, Houston, Texas

- Date: Saturday October 12, 2024
- Game time: 6:00 p.m.
- TV announcers (YouTube): TBD

Game information

First quarter
Second quarter
Third quarter
Fourth quarter

Statistics	SOU	TXSO
First downs		
Total yards		
Rushing yards		
Passing yards		
Passing: Comp–Att–Int		
Time of possession		

Team	Category	Player	Statistics
Southern	Passing		
Southern	Rushing		
Southern	Receiving		
Texas Southern	Passing		
Texas Southern	Rushing		
Texas Southern	Receiving		

=== Alcorn State ===
Game Seven – Alcorn State Braves (4–3) vs Southern Jaguars (3–3) – Game summary

Quarter	1	2	3	4	Total
Braves	0	0	0	0	0
Jaguars	0	0	0	0	0

at A. W. Mumford Stadium, Baton Rouge, Louisiana

- Date: Saturday October 19, 2024
- Game time: 6:00 p.m.
- TV announcers (ESPN+): TBD

Game information

First quarter
Second quarter
Third quarter
Fourth quarter

Statistics	ALCN	SOU
First downs		
Total yards		
Rushing yards		
Passing yards		
Passing: Comp–Att–Int		
Time of possession		

Team	Category	Player	Statistics
Alcorn State	Passing		
Alcorn State	Rushing		
Alcorn State	Receiving		
Southern	Passing		
Southern	Rushing		
Southern	Receiving		

=== at Florida A&M ===
Game Eight – Southern Jaguars (4–3) vs Florida A&M Rattlers (3–3) – Game summary

Quarter	1	2	3	4	Total
Jaguars	0	0	0	0	0
Rattlers	0	0	0	0	0

at Bragg Memorial Stadium, Tallahassee, FL

- Date: Saturday October 26, 2024
- Game time: 6:00 p.m.
- TV announcers (ESPN+): TBD

Game information

First quarter
Second quarter
Third quarter
Fourth quarter

Statistics	SOU	FAMU
First downs		
Total yards		
Rushing yards		
Passing yards		
Passing: Comp–Att–Int		
Time of possession		

Team	Category	Player	Statistics
Southern	Passing		
Southern	Rushing		
Southern	Receiving		
Florida A&M	Passing		
Florida A&M	Rushing		
Florida A&M	Receiving		

=== at Alabama A&M ===
Game Nine – Southern Jaguars (4–4) vs Alabama A&M Bulldogs (3–4) – Game summary

Quarter	1	2	3	4	Total
Jaguars	0	0	0	0	0
Bulldogs	0	0	0	0	0

at Louis Crews Stadium, Huntsville, Alabama

- Date: Saturday November 2, 2024
- Game time: 2:00 p.m.
- TV announcers (HBCU GO): TBD

Game information

First quarter
Second quarter
Third quarter
Fourth quarter

Statistics	SOU	AAMU
First downs		
Total yards		
Rushing yards		
Passing yards		
Passing: Comp–Att–Int		
Time of possession		

Team	Category	Player	Statistics
Southern	Passing		
Southern	Rushing		
Southern	Receiving		
Alabama A&M	Passing		
Alabama A&M	Rushing		
Alabama A&M	Receiving		

=== Bethune–Cookman ===
Game Ten – Bethune–Cookman Wildcats (2–7) vs Southern Jaguars (5–4) – Game summary

Quarter	1	2	3	4	Total
Wildcats	0	0	0	0	0
Jaguars	0	0	0	0	0

at A. W. Mumford Stadium, Baton Rouge, Louisiana

- Date: Saturday November 9, 2024
- Game time: 2:00 p.m.
- TV announcers (Jaguar Sports Network): TBD

Game information

First quarter
Second quarter
Third quarter
Fourth quarter

Statistics	BCU	SOU
First downs		
Total yards		
Rushing yards		
Passing yards		
Passing: Comp–Att–Int		
Time of possession		

Team	Category	Player	Statistics
Bethune–Cookman	Passing		
Bethune–Cookman	Rushing		
Bethune–Cookman	Receiving		
Southern	Passing		
Southern	Rushing		
Southern	Receiving		

=== Arkansas–Pine Bluff ===
Game Eleven – Arkansas–Pine Bluff Golden Lions (3–7) vs Southern Jaguars (6–4) – Game summary

Quarter	1	2	3	4	Total
Golden Lions	0	0	0	0	0
Jaguars	0	0	0	0	0

at A. W. Mumford Stadium, Baton Rouge, Louisiana

- Date: Saturday November 16, 2024
- Game time: 2:00 p.m.
- TV announcers (Jaguar Sports Network): TBD

Game information

First quarter
Second quarter
Third quarter
Fourth quarter

Statistics	UAPB	SOU
First downs		
Total yards		
Rushing yards		
Passing yards		
Passing: Comp–Att–Int		
Time of possession		

Team	Category	Player	Statistics
Arkansas–Pine Bluff	Passing		
Arkansas–Pine Bluff	Rushing		
Arkansas–Pine Bluff	Receiving		
Southern	Passing		
Southern	Rushing		
Southern	Receiving		

=== vs. Grambling State (Bayou Classic) ===
Game Twelve – Southern Jaguars (7–4) vs. Grambling State Tigers (5–6) – Game summary

Quarter	1	2	3	4	Total
Jaguars	0	0	0	0	0
Tigers	0	0	0	0	0

at Caesars Superdome • New Orleans, Louisiana

- Date: Saturday November 30, 2024
- Game time: 1:00 p.m.
- Game weather: 0 °F (−18 °C)
- TV: NBC

Game information

First quarter
Second quarter
Third quarter
Fourth quarter

Statistics	SOU	GRAM
First downs		
Total yards		
Rushing yards		
Passing yards		
Passing: Comp–Att–Int		
Time of possession		

Team	Category	Player	Statistics
Southern	Passing		
Southern	Rushing		
Southern	Receiving		
Grambling State	Passing		
Grambling State	Rushing		
Grambling State	Receiving		

=== at No. 18 Jackson State (SWAC Championship / rivalry) ===
Game Thirteen – Southern Jaguars (8–4) vs No. 18 Jackson State Tigers (10–2) (SWAC Championship) – Game summary

Quarter	1	2	3	4	Total
Jaguars	0	0	0	0	0
No. 18 Tigers	0	0	0	0	0

at Mississippi Veterans Memorial Stadium, Jackson, Mississippi

- Date: Saturday December 7, 2024
- Game time: 2:00 p.m.
- Referee: Charles Green
- TV announcers (ESPN2): Tiffany Greene (play-by-play), Jay Walker (analyst), and Coley Harvey (sideline reporter)

Game information

First quarter
Second quarter
Third quarter
Fourth quarter

Statistics	SOU	JKST
First downs		
Total yards		
Rushing yards		
Passing yards		
Passing: Comp–Att–Int		
Time of possession		

Team	Category	Player	Statistics
Southern	Passing		
Southern	Rushing		
Southern	Receiving		
Jackson State	Passing		
Jackson State	Rushing		
Jackson State	Receiving		
