= 2024 Alabama State Hornets football team =

American college football season

2024 Alabama State Hornets football
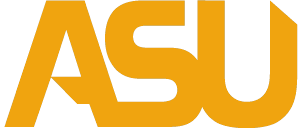
- Conference: Southwestern Athletic Conference
- East Division
- Record: 7–5 (5–3 SWAC)
- Head coach: Eddie Robinson (3rd season)
- Offensive coordinator: Chris Barnette (1st season)
- Defensive coordinator: Ryan Lewis Sr. (3rd season)
- Home stadium: ASU Stadium

2024 Southwestern Athletic Conference football standings
	Conf.			Overall
Team	W		L	W		L
East Division
No. 18 Jackson State xy$	8	–	1	12	–	2
Florida A&M	5	–	3	7	–	5
Alabama State	5	–	3	7	–	5
Alabama A&M	4	–	4	6	–	6
Bethune–Cookman	2	–	6	2	–	10
Mississippi Valley State	1	–	7	1	–	11
West Division
Southern xy	7	–	2	8	–	5
Alcorn State	5	–	3	6	–	6
Texas Southern	4	–	4	5	–	6
Prairie View A&M	3	–	5	5	–	7
Grambling State	2	–	6	5	–	7
Arkansas–Pine Bluff	2	–	6	3	–	9
Championship: Jackson State 41, Southern 13
$ – Conference champion; x – Division champion/co-champions; y – Championship game participant; Rankings from STATS Poll

The 2024 Alabama State Hornets football team represented Alabama State University as a member of the Southwestern Athletic Conference (SWAC) during the 2024 NCAA Division I FCS football season. The Hornets were coached by third-year head coach Eddie Robinson and played at ASU Stadium in Montgomery, Alabama.

== Schedule ==
Date	Time	Opponent	Site	TV	Result	Attendance
September 1	2:00 p.m.	vs. North Carolina Central*	Hard Rock Stadium; Miami Gardens, FL (Orange Blossom Classic)	ESPN	L 24–31	10,256
September 7	5:00 p.m.	Miles*	ASU Stadium; Montgomery, AL	ESPN+	W 24–3	15,225
September 14	6:00 p.m.	at Samford*	Pete Hanna Stadium; Homewood, AL	ESPN+	L 7–12	6,045
September 28	2:00 p.m.	at Bethune–Cookman	Daytona Stadium; Daytona Beach, FL	HBCU Go	W 26–21	6,721
October 5	2:00 p.m.	Florida A&M^{†}	ASU Stadium; Montgomery, AL	ESPN+	L 13–28	33,576
October 12	2:00 p.m.	Mississippi Valley State	ASU Stadium; Montgomery, AL		W 54–17	10,427
October 26	2:30 p.m.	vs. Alabama A&M	Legion Field; Birmingham, AL (Magic City Classic)	ESPNU	W 27–19	69,125
November 2	4:00 p.m.	vs. Alcorn State	Ladd–Peebles Stadium; Mobile, AL (Port City Classic)	ESPN+	W 21–17	7,831
November 9	2:00 p.m.	at Grambling State	Eddie G. Robinson Memorial Stadium; Grambling, LA	ESPN+	L 23–24	3,621
November 16	2:00 p.m.	No. 23 Jackson State	ASU Stadium; Montgomery, AL	ESPN+	L 10–16	21,798
November 23	2:00 p.m.	Prairie View A&M	ASU Stadium; Montgomery, AL	ESPN+	W 9–6	8,265
November 28	1:00 p.m.	Tuskegee*	ASU Stadium; Montgomery, AL (Turkey Day Classic)	ESPNU	W 34–6	21,567
*Non-conference game; ^{†}Homecoming; Rankings from STATS Poll released prior to the game; All times are in Central time

== Game summaries ==
=== vs. North Carolina Central ===
Game One – North Carolina Central Eagles (0–0) vs Alabama State Hornets (0–0) – Game summary

Quarter	1	2	3	4	Total
Eagles	0	0	0	0	0
Hornets	0	0	0	0	0

at Hard Rock Stadium, Miami Gardens, Florida

- Date: Sunday September 1, 2024
- Game time: 2:00 PM CST
- TV announcers (ESPN): Tiffany Greene (play-by-play) and Jay Walker (analyst)

Game information

First quarter
Second quarter
Third quarter
Fourth quarter

Statistics	NCCU	ALST
First downs		
Total yards		
Rushing yards		
Passing yards		
Passing: Comp–Att–Int		
Time of possession		

Team	Category	Player	Statistics
North Carolina Central	Passing		
North Carolina Central	Rushing		
North Carolina Central	Receiving		
Alabama State	Passing		
Alabama State	Rushing		
Alabama State	Receiving		

=== vs. Miles (DII) ===
Game Two – Miles Golden Bears (DII) (0–1) vs Alabama State Hornets (0–1) – Game summary

Quarter	1	2	3	4	Total
Golden Bears (DII)	0	0	0	0	0
Hornets	0	0	0	0	0

at ASU Stadium, Montgomery, Alabama

- Date: Saturday September 7, 2024
- Game time: 5:00 PM CST
- TV announcers (ESPN+): Santoria Black, Mo Carter

Game information

First quarter
Second quarter
Third quarter
Fourth quarter

Statistics	MIL	ALST
First downs		
Total yards		
Rushing yards		
Passing yards		
Passing: Comp–Att–Int		
Time of possession		

Team	Category	Player	Statistics
Miles	Passing		
Miles	Rushing		
Miles	Receiving		
Alabama State	Passing		
Alabama State	Rushing		
Alabama State	Receiving		

=== at Samford ===
Game Three – Alabama State Hornets (1–1) vs Samford Bulldogs (0–2) – Game summary

Quarter	1	2	3	4	Total
Hornets	0	0	0	0	0
Bulldogs	0	0	0	0	0

at Pete Hanna Stadium, Homewood, Alabama

- Date: Saturday September 14, 2024
- Game time: 6:00 PM
- TV announcers (ESPN+): Blake Gardner, Damian Mitchell, Lynden Blake

Game information

First quarter
Second quarter
Third quarter
Fourth quarter

Statistics	ALST	SAM
First downs		
Total yards		
Rushing yards		
Passing yards		
Passing: Comp–Att–Int		
Time of possession		

Team	Category	Player	Statistics
Alabama State	Passing		
Alabama State	Rushing		
Alabama State	Receiving		
Samford	Passing		
Samford	Rushing		
Samford	Receiving		

=== at Bethune–Cookman ===
Game Four – Alabama State Hornets (1–2) at Bethune–Cookman Wildcats (0–4) – Game summary

Quarter	1	2	3	4	Total
Hornets	0	0	0	0	0
Wildcats	0	0	0	0	0

at Daytona Stadium • Daytona Beach, FL

- Date: September 28, 2024
- Game time: 3:00 p.m.
- Game weather: 0 °F (−18 °C)
- TV announcers (HBCU GO): Charlie Neal, Jon Kelley, Lawrencia Moten

Game information

First quarter
Second quarter
Third quarter
Fourth quarter

Statistics	ALST	BCU
First downs		
Total yards		
Rushing yards		
Passing yards		
Passing: Comp–Att–Int		
Time of possession		

Team	Category	Player	Statistics
Alabama State	Passing		
Alabama State	Rushing		
Alabama State	Receiving		
Bethune–Cookman	Passing		
Bethune–Cookman	Rushing		
Bethune–Cookman	Receiving		

=== vs. Florida A&M ===
Game Five – Florida A&M Rattlers (2–2) vs Alabama State Hornets (2–2) – Game summary

Quarter	1	2	3	4	Total
Rattlers	0	0	0	0	0
Hornets	0	0	0	0	0

at ASU Stadium, Montgomery, Alabama

- Date: Saturday October 5, 2024
- Game time: 2:00 PM CST
- TV announcers (ESPN+): Santoria Black, Mo Carter

Game information

First quarter
Second quarter
Third quarter
Fourth quarter

Statistics	FAMU	ALST
First downs		
Total yards		
Rushing yards		
Passing yards		
Passing: Comp–Att–Int		
Time of possession		

Team	Category	Player	Statistics
Florida A&M	Passing		
Florida A&M	Rushing		
Florida A&M	Receiving		
Alabama State	Passing		
Alabama State	Rushing		
Alabama State	Receiving		

=== vs. Mississippi Valley State ===
Game Six – Mississippi Valley State Delta Devils (0–5) vs Alabama State Hornets (2–3) – Game summary

Quarter	1	2	3	4	Total
Delta Devils	0	0	0	0	0
Hornets	0	0	0	0	0

at ASU Stadium, Montgomery, Alabama

- Date: Saturday October 12, 2024
- Game time: 2:00 PM CST
- TV announcers (ESPN+): Graham Dunn, Reggie Barlow

Game information

First quarter
Second quarter
Third quarter
Fourth quarter

Statistics	MVSU	ALST
First downs		
Total yards		
Rushing yards		
Passing yards		
Passing: Comp–Att–Int		
Time of possession		

Team	Category	Player	Statistics
Mississippi Valley State	Passing		
Mississippi Valley State	Rushing		
Mississippi Valley State	Receiving		
Alabama State	Passing		
Alabama State	Rushing		
Alabama State	Receiving		

=== vs. Alabama A&M (Magic City Classic) ===
Game Seven – Alabama State Hornets (3–3) vs Alabama A&M Bulldogs (3–3) – Game summary

Quarter	1	2	3	4	Total
Hornets	0	0	0	0	0
Bulldogs	0	0	0	0	0

at Legion Field, Birmingham, Alabama

- Date: Saturday October 26, 2024
- Game time: 2:30 PM
- TV announcers (ESPNU): Tiffany Greene (play-by-play) and Jay Walker (analyst)

Game information

First quarter
Second quarter
Third quarter
Fourth quarter

Statistics	ALST	AAMU
First downs		
Total yards		
Rushing yards		
Passing yards		
Passing: Comp–Att–Int		
Time of possession		

Team	Category	Player	Statistics
Alabama State	Passing		
Alabama State	Rushing		
Alabama State	Receiving		
Alabama A&M	Passing		
Alabama A&M	Rushing		
Alabama A&M	Receiving		

=== vs. Alcorn State ===
Game Eight – Alcorn State Braves (4–4) vs Alabama State Hornets (4–3) – Game summary

Quarter	1	2	3	4	Total
Braves	0	0	0	0	0
Hornets	0	0	0	0	0

at Ladd–Peebles Stadium, Mobile, AL

- Date: Saturday November 2, 2024
- Game time: 4:00 p.m.
- TV announcers (ESPN+): Mo Carter, Ken Moore

Game information

First quarter
Second quarter
Third quarter
Fourth quarter

Statistics	ALCN	ALST
First downs		
Total yards		
Rushing yards		
Passing yards		
Passing: Comp–Att–Int		
Time of possession		

Team	Category	Player	Statistics
Alcorn State	Passing		
Alcorn State	Rushing		
Alcorn State	Receiving		
Alabama State	Passing		
Alabama State	Rushing		
Alabama State	Receiving		

=== at Grambling State ===
Game Nine – Alabama State Hornets (5–3) at Grambling State Tigers (4–5) – Game summary

Quarter	1	2	3	4	Total
Hornets	0	0	0	0	0
Tigers	0	0	0	0	0

at Eddie G. Robinson Memorial Stadium • Grambling, LA

- Date: Saturday November 9, 2024
- Game time: 2:00 p.m.
- Game weather: 0 °F (−18 °C)
- TV announcers (ESPN+): Santoria Black, Stan Becton

Game information

First quarter
Second quarter
Third quarter
Fourth quarter

Statistics	ALST	GRAM
First downs		
Total yards		
Rushing yards		
Passing yards		
Passing: Comp–Att–Int		
Time of possession		

Team	Category	Player	Statistics
Alabama State	Passing		
Alabama State	Rushing		
Alabama State	Receiving		
Grambling State	Passing		
Grambling State	Rushing		
Grambling State	Receiving		

=== vs. No. 23 Jackson State ===
Game Ten – No. 23 Jackson State Tigers (8–2) vs Alabama State Hornets (5–4) – Game summary

Quarter	1	2	3	4	Total
No. 23 Tigers	0	0	0	0	0
Hornets	0	0	0	0	0

at ASU Stadium, Montgomery, Alabama

- Date: Saturday November 16, 2024
- Game time: 2:00 PM CST
- TV announcers (ESPN+): Mo Carter, Tolly Carr

Game information

First quarter
Second quarter
Third quarter
Fourth quarter

Statistics	JKST	ALST
First downs		
Total yards		
Rushing yards		
Passing yards		
Passing: Comp–Att–Int		
Time of possession		

Team	Category	Player	Statistics
Jackson State	Passing		
Jackson State	Rushing		
Jackson State	Receiving		
Alabama State	Passing		
Alabama State	Rushing		
Alabama State	Receiving		

=== vs. Prairie View A&M ===
Game Eleven – Prairie View A&M Panthers (5–6) vs Alabama State Hornets (5–5) – Game summary

Quarter	1	2	3	4	Total
Panthers	0	0	0	0	0
Hornets	0	0	0	0	0

at ASU Stadium, Montgomery, Alabama

- Date: Saturday November 23, 2024
- Game time: 2:00 PM CST
- TV announcers (ESPN+): Mo Taylor, Tolly Carr

Game information

First quarter
Second quarter
Third quarter
Fourth quarter

Statistics	PV	ALST
First downs		
Total yards		
Rushing yards		
Passing yards		
Passing: Comp–Att–Int		
Time of possession		

Team	Category	Player	Statistics
Prairie View A&M	Passing		
Prairie View A&M	Rushing		
Prairie View A&M	Receiving		
Alabama State	Passing		
Alabama State	Rushing		
Alabama State	Receiving		

=== vs. Tuskegee (DII) (Turkey Day Classic) ===
Game Eleven – Tuskegee Golden Tigers (DII) (5–5) vs Alabama State Hornets (6–5) – Game summary

Quarter	1	2	3	4	Total
Golden Tigers (DII)	0	0	0	0	0
Hornets	0	0	0	0	0

at ASU Stadium, Montgomery, Alabama

- Date: Thursday November 28, 2024
- Game time: 1:00 PM CST
- TV announcers (ESPNU): Tiffany Greene (play-by-play) and Jay Walker (analyst)

Game information

First quarter
Second quarter
Third quarter
Fourth quarter

Statistics	TUSK	ALST
First downs		
Total yards		
Rushing yards		
Passing yards		
Passing: Comp–Att–Int		
Time of possession		

Team	Category	Player	Statistics
Tuskegee	Passing		
Tuskegee	Rushing		
Tuskegee	Receiving		
Alabama State	Passing		
Alabama State	Rushing		
Alabama State	Receiving		
