= 2024 Texas Southern Tigers football team =

American college football season

2024 Texas Southern Tigers football
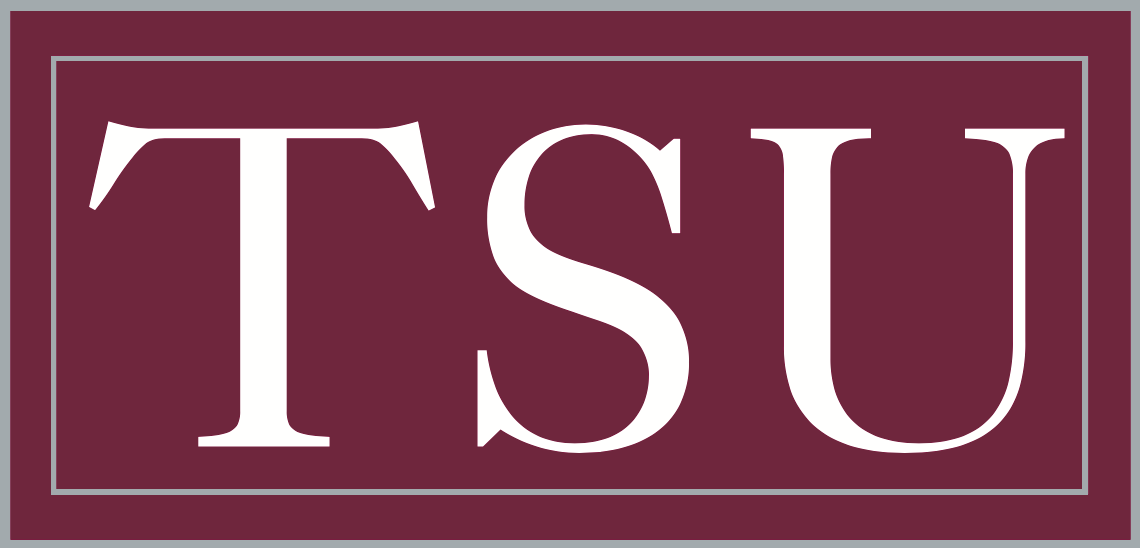
- Conference: Southwestern Athletic Conference
- West Division
- Record: 5–6 (4–4 SWAC)
- Head coach: Cris Dishman (1st season)
- Offensive coordinator: Steven Smith (1st season)
- Defensive coordinator: Billy Parker (1st season)
- Home stadium: Shell Energy Stadium

2024 Southwestern Athletic Conference football standings
	Conf.			Overall
Team	W		L	W		L
East Division
No. 18 Jackson State xy$	8	–	1	12	–	2
Florida A&M	5	–	3	7	–	5
Alabama State	5	–	3	7	–	5
Alabama A&M	4	–	4	6	–	6
Bethune–Cookman	2	–	6	2	–	10
Mississippi Valley State	1	–	7	1	–	11
West Division
Southern xy	7	–	2	8	–	5
Alcorn State	5	–	3	6	–	6
Texas Southern	4	–	4	5	–	6
Prairie View A&M	3	–	5	5	–	7
Grambling State	2	–	6	5	–	7
Arkansas–Pine Bluff	2	–	6	3	–	9
Championship: Jackson State 41, Southern 13
$ – Conference champion; x – Division champion/co-champions; y – Championship game participant; Rankings from STATS Poll

The 2024 Texas Southern Tigers football team represented Texas Southern University as a member of the Southwestern Athletic Conference (SWAC) during the 2024 NCAA Division I FCS football season. The Tigers were coached by first-year head coach Cris Dishman and played at Shell Energy Stadium in Houston, Texas.

== Schedule ==
Date	Time	Opponent	Site	TV	Result	Attendance
August 31	6:00 pm	at Prairie View A&M	Panther Stadium; Prairie View, TX (Labor Day Classic)	ESPN+	W 27–9	13,206
September 7	6:00 pm	at Rice*	Rice Stadium; Houston, TX	ESPN+	L 7–69	17,760
September 21	6:00 pm	at No. 22 Lamar*	Provost Umphrey Stadium; Beaumont, TX	ESPN+	L 17–20	8,443
September 28	6:00 pm	Jackson State	Shell Energy Stadium; Houston, TX	ESPN+	L 14–43	13,173
October 5	2:00 pm	Virginia–Lynchburg*^{†}	Alexander Durley Sports Complex; Houston, TX	SWAC Digital Network	W 28–10	7,000
October 12	6:00 pm	Southern	Shell Energy Stadium; Houston, TX	YouTube	L 19–22	14,007
October 26	6:00 pm	Grambling State	Shell Energy Stadium; Houston, TX		W 24–17	10,029
November 2	3:00 pm	at Florida A&M	Bragg Memorial Stadium; Tallahassee, FL	ESPN+	L 28–52	23,271
November 9	2:00 pm	at Alcorn State	Jack Spinks Stadium; Lorman, MS		L 21–42	2,112
November 16	2:00 pm	Bethune–Cookman	Shell Energy Stadium; Houston, TX		W 17–14	6,916
November 23	2:00 pm	at Arkansas–Pine Bluff	Simmons Bank Field; Pine Bluff, AR		W 31–23	3,723
*Non-conference game; ^{†}Homecoming; Rankings from STATS Poll released prior to the game; All times are in Central time

== Game summaries ==
=== at Prairie View A&M (Labor Day Classic) ===
Game One – Texas Southern Tigers (0–0) at Prairie View A&M Panthers (0–0) – Game summary

Quarter	1	2	3	4	Total
Tigers	0	0	0	0	0
Panthers	0	0	0	0	0

at Panther Stadium • Prairie View, Texas

- Date: Saturday August 31, 2024
- Game time: 6:00 p.m. CDT
- TV announcers (ESPN+): TBD

Game information

First quarter

Second quarter

Third quarter

Fourth quarter

Statistics	TXSO	PV
First downs		
Plays–yards		
Rushes–yards		
Passing yards		
Passing: Comp–Att–Int		
Time of possession		

Team	Category	Player	Statistics
Texas Southern	Passing		
Texas Southern	Rushing		
Texas Southern	Receiving		
Prairie View A&M	Passing		
Prairie View A&M	Rushing		
Prairie View A&M	Receiving		

=== at Rice (FBS) ===
Game Two – Texas Southern Tigers (1–0) at Rice Owls (FBS) (0–1) – Game summary

Quarter	1	2	3	4	Total
Tigers	0	0	0	7	7
Owls (FBS)	14	24	17	14	69

at Rice Stadium • Houston, Texas

- Date: Saturday September 7, 2024
- Game time: 6:00 p.m. CDT
- Game weather: Sunny • Temperature: 85 °F (29 °C) • Wind: NE at 13 miles per hour (21 km/h)
- Game attendance: 17,760
- Referee: James Jones
- TV announcers (ESPN+): Shawn Kenney (play-by-play) and LaDarrin McLane (analyst)

Game information

First quarter

- (8:43) RICE – Dean Connors 5 yard run, Enock Gota kick (Drive: 8 plays, 68 yards, 3:51; Rice 7–0)
- (1:15) RICE – Braylen Walker 4 yard pass from E.J. Warner, Enock Gota kick (Drive: 11 plays, 56 yards, 5:08; Rice 14–0)

Second quarter

- (11:48) RICE – Matt Sykes 34 yard pass from E.J. Warner, Enock Gota kick (Drive: 1 play, 34 yards, 0:07; Rice 21–0)
- (10:59) RICE – Tyson Flowers 34 yard interception return, Enock Gota kick (Rice 28–0)
- (6:46) RICE – Dean Connors 5 yard run, Enock Gota kick (Drive: 3 plays, 47 yards, 1:22; Rice 35–0)
- (0:02) RICE – Enock Gota 25 yard field goal (Drive: 15 plays, 67 yards, 1:56; Rice 38–0)

Third quarter

- (14:37) RICE – Dean Connors 71 yard run, Enock Gota kick (Drive: 1 play, 71 yards, 0:14; Rice 45–0)
- (8:59) RICE – Enock Gota 44 yard field goal (Drive: 6 plays, 29 yards, 2:58; Rice 48–0)
- (1:04) RICE – Taji Atkins 5 yard run, Enock Gota kick (Drive: 11 plays, 78 yards, 6:28; Rice 55–0)

Fourth quarter

- (10:08) RICE – Taji Atkins 33 yard run, Enock Gota kick (Drive: 3 plays, 45 yards, 1:31; Rice 62–0)
- (7:07) RICE – Coleman Bennett 22 yard run, Tim Horn kick (Drive: 2 plays, 28 yards, 0:54; Rice 69–0)
- (0:14) TXSO – Kordell Rodgers 12 yard pass from Jordon Davis, Gustavo Romero kick (Drive: 13 plays, 75 yards, 6:53; Rice 69–7)

Statistics	TXSO	RICE
First downs	9	24
Plays–yards	53–87	64–533
Rushes–yards	34–38	32–329
Passing yards	49	204
Passing: Comp–Att–Int	10–19–2	22–32–1
Time of possession	33:04	26:56

Team	Category	Player	Statistics
Texas Southern	Passing	Jordon Davis	8/13, 42 yards, 1 TD, 1 INT
Texas Southern	Rushing	Danny Green Jr.	7 carries, 18 yards
Texas Southern	Receiving	Kordell Rodgers	3 receptions, 23 yards, 1 TD
Rice	Passing	E. J. Warner	20/30, 189 yards, 2 TD, 1 INT
Rice	Rushing	Dean Connors	9 carries, 113 yards, 3 TD
Rice	Receiving	Matt Sykes	2 receptions, 47 yards, 1 TD

=== at No. 22 Lamar ===
Game Three – Texas Southern Tigers (1–1) at No. 22 Lamar Cardinals (FBS) (2–1) – Game summary

Quarter	1	2	3	4	Total
Tigers	3	7	0	7	17
No. 22 Cardinals	0	0	7	13	20

at Provost Umphrey Stadium • Beaumont, Texas

- Date: Saturday September 21, 2024
- Game time: 6:00 p.m. CDT
- Game weather: Temperature: 88 °F (31 °C) • Wind: SE at 10 miles per hour (16 km/h) • Weather: Sunny
- Game attendance: 8,443
- Referee: Ed Bourgeois
- TV: ESPN+
- Box Score

Game information

First Quarter

- (05:29) TSU – Romero, Gustavo 20 yd field goal Drive: 16 plays, 72 yards, TOP 09:31, Tigers 3–0.

Second Quarter

- (01:05) TSU – Lewis, Chaunzavia 7 yd run (Romero, Gustavo kick) Drive: 2 plays, 14 yards, TOP 00:47, Tigers 10–0.

Third Quarter

- (05:00) LU – Griffin, Khalan 1 yd run (Esqueda, Chris kick) Drive: 8 plays, 40 yards, TOP 05:41, Tigers 10–7.

Fourth Quarter

- (08:32) LU – Gibbs, Devyn 13 yd pass from Longino, Jakolby (Extra point failed) Drive: 12 plays, 66 yards, TOP 06:23, Cardinals 10–13.
- (03:48) TSU – Lewis, Chaunzavia 6 yd run (Romero, Gustavo kick) Drive: 8 plays, 67 yards, TOP 04:37, Tigers 17–13.
- (01:05) LU – Griffin, Khalan 3 yd run (Esqueda, Chris kick) Drive: 12 plays, 76 yards, TOP 02:40, Cardinals 17–20.

Statistics	TXSO	LAM
First downs	18	17
Plays–yards	59–278	52–249
Rushes–yards	49–223	35–186
Passing yards	55	63
Passing: Comp–Att–Int	6–10–0	9–17–1
Time of possession	35:17	24:43

Team	Category	Player	Statistics
Texas Southern	Passing	Jordan Davis	6/10, 55 yards, 0 TD
Texas Southern	Rushing	Quintell Quinn	23 carries, 149 yards 0 TD
Texas Southern	Receiving	Kerien Charlo	2 receptions, 23 yards 0 TD
Lamar	Passing	Jakolby Longino	9/16, 63 yards, 1 TD
Lamar	Rushing	Khalan Griffin	22 carries, 132 yards 2 TD
Lamar	Receiving	Izaha Jones	3 receptions, 27 yards 0 TD

=== Jackson State ===
Game Four – Jackson State Tigers (2–2) vs Texas Southern Tigers (1–2) – Game summary

Quarter	1	2	3	4	Total
Jackson State	0	0	0	0	0
Texas Southern	0	0	0	0	0

at Shell Energy Stadium, Houston, Texas

- Date: Saturday September 28, 2024
- Game time: 6:00 p.m.
- TV announcers (ESPN+): TBD

Game information

First quarter
Second quarter
Third quarter
Fourth quarter

Statistics	JKST	TXSO
First downs		
Total yards		
Rushing yards		
Passing yards		
Passing: Comp–Att–Int		
Time of possession		

Team	Category	Player	Statistics
Jackson State	Passing		
Jackson State	Rushing		
Jackson State	Receiving		
Texas Southern	Passing		
Texas Southern	Rushing		
Texas Southern	Receiving		

=== VUL (NCCAA) ===
Game Five – VUL Dragons (NCCAA) (0–5) vs Texas Southern Tigers (1–3) – Game summary

Quarter	1	2	3	4	Total
Dragons (NCCAA)	0	0	0	0	0
Tigers	0	0	0	0	0

at Shell Energy Stadium, Houston, Texas

- Date: Saturday October 5, 2024
- Game time: 2:00 p.m.
- TV announcers (SWAC Digital Network): TBD

Game information

First quarter
Second quarter
Third quarter
Fourth quarter

Statistics	VUL	TXSO
First downs		
Total yards		
Rushing yards		
Passing yards		
Passing: Comp–Att–Int		
Time of possession		

Team	Category	Player	Statistics
VUL	Passing		
VUL	Rushing		
VUL	Receiving		
Texas Southern	Passing		
Texas Southern	Rushing		
Texas Southern	Receiving		

=== Southern ===
Game Six – Southern Jaguars (2–3) vs Texas Southern Tigers (2–3) – Game summary

Quarter	1	2	3	4	Total
Jaguars	0	0	0	0	0
Tigers	0	0	0	0	0

at Shell Energy Stadium, Houston, Texas

- Date: Saturday October 12, 2024
- Game time: 6:00 p.m.
- TV announcers (YouTube): TBD

Game information

First quarter
Second quarter
Third quarter
Fourth quarter

Statistics	SOU	TXSO
First downs		
Total yards		
Rushing yards		
Passing yards		
Passing: Comp–Att–Int		
Time of possession		

Team	Category	Player	Statistics
Southern	Passing		
Southern	Rushing		
Southern	Receiving		
Texas Southern	Passing		
Texas Southern	Rushing		
Texas Southern	Receiving		

=== Grambling State ===
Game Seven – Grambling State Tigers (4–3) vs Texas Southern Tigers (2–4) – Game summary

Quarter	1	2	3	4	Total
Grambling State	0	0	0	0	0
Texas Southern	0	0	0	0	0

at Shell Energy Stadium, Houston, Texas

- Date: Saturday October 26, 2024
- Game time: 6:00 p.m.
- TV announcers: TBD

Game information

First quarter
Second quarter
Third quarter
Fourth quarter

Statistics	GRAM	TXSO
First downs		
Total yards		
Rushing yards		
Passing yards		
Passing: Comp–Att–Int		
Time of possession		

Team	Category	Player	Statistics
Grambling State	Passing		
Grambling State	Rushing		
Grambling State	Receiving		
Texas Southern	Passing		
Texas Southern	Rushing		
Texas Southern	Receiving		

=== at Florida A&M ===
Game Eight – Texas Southern Tigers (3–4) vs Florida A&M Rattlers (4–3) – Game summary

Quarter	1	2	3	4	Total
Tigers	0	0	0	0	0
Rattlers	0	0	0	0	0

at Bragg Memorial Stadium, Tallahassee, FL

- Date: Saturday November 2, 2024
- Game time: 3:00 p.m.
- TV: ESPN+

Game information

First quarter
Second quarter
Third quarter
Fourth quarter

Statistics	TXSO	FAMU
First downs		
Total yards		
Rushing yards		
Passing yards		
Passing: Comp–Att–Int		
Time of possession		

Team	Category	Player	Statistics
Texas Southern	Passing		
Texas Southern	Rushing		
Texas Southern	Receiving		
Florida A&M	Passing		
Florida A&M	Rushing		
Florida A&M	Receiving		

=== at Alcorn State ===
Game Nine – Texas Southern Tigers (3–5) vs Alcorn State Braves (4–5) – Game summary

Quarter	1	2	3	4	Total
Tigers	0	0	0	0	0
Braves	0	0	0	0	0

at Jack Spinks Stadium, Lorman, MS

- Date: Saturday November 9, 2024
- Game time: 2:00 p.m.

Game information

First quarter
Second quarter
Third quarter
Fourth quarter

Statistics	TXSO	ALCN
First downs		
Total yards		
Rushing yards		
Passing yards		
Passing: Comp–Att–Int		
Time of possession		

Team	Category	Player	Statistics
Texas Southern	Passing		
Texas Southern	Rushing		
Texas Southern	Receiving		
Alcorn State	Passing		
Alcorn State	Rushing		
Alcorn State	Receiving		

=== Bethune–Cookman ===
Game Ten – Bethune–Cookman Wildcats (2–8) vs Texas Southern Tigers (3–6) – Game summary

Quarter	1	2	3	4	Total
Wildcats	0	0	0	0	0
Tigers	0	0	0	0	0

at Shell Energy Stadium, Houston, Texas

- Date: Saturday November 16, 2024
- Game time: 2:00 p.m.
- TV announcers: TBD

Game information

First quarter
Second quarter
Third quarter
Fourth quarter

Statistics	BCU	TXSO
First downs		
Total yards		
Rushing yards		
Passing yards		
Passing: Comp–Att–Int		
Time of possession		

Team	Category	Player	Statistics
Bethune–Cookman	Passing		
Bethune–Cookman	Rushing		
Bethune–Cookman	Receiving		
Texas Southern	Passing		
Texas Southern	Rushing		
Texas Southern	Receiving		

=== at Arkansas–Pine Bluff ===
Game Twelve – Texas Southern Tigers (4–6) vs Arkansas–Pine Bluff Golden Lions (3–8) – Game summary

Quarter	1	2	3	4	Total
Tigers	0	0	0	0	0
Golden Lions	0	0	0	0	0

at Simmons Bank Field, Pine Bluff, AR

- Date: Saturday November 23, 2024
- Game time: 2:00 p.m.

Game information

First quarter
Second quarter
Third quarter
Fourth quarter

Statistics	TXSO	UAPB
First downs		
Total yards		
Rushing yards		
Passing yards		
Passing: Comp–Att–Int		
Time of possession		

Team	Category	Player	Statistics
Texas Southern	Passing		
Texas Southern	Rushing		
Texas Southern	Receiving		
Arkansas–Pine Bluff	Passing		
Arkansas–Pine Bluff	Rushing		
Arkansas–Pine Bluff	Receiving		
