= 2024 Arkansas–Pine Bluff Golden Lions football team =

American college football season

2024 Arkansas–Pine Bluff Golden Lions football
- Conference: Southwestern Athletic Conference
- West Division
- Record: 3–9 (2–6 SWAC)
- Head coach: Alonzo Hampton (2nd season)
- Offensive coordinator: Tony Hull (1st season)
- Offensive scheme: Spread option
- Defensive coordinator: David Calloway (2nd season)
- Base defense: 4–3
- Home stadium: Simmons Bank Field

2024 Southwestern Athletic Conference football standings
	Conf.			Overall
Team	W		L	W		L
East Division
No. 18 Jackson State xy$	8	–	1	12	–	2
Florida A&M	5	–	3	7	–	5
Alabama State	5	–	3	7	–	5
Alabama A&M	4	–	4	6	–	6
Bethune–Cookman	2	–	6	2	–	10
Mississippi Valley State	1	–	7	1	–	11
West Division
Southern xy	7	–	2	8	–	5
Alcorn State	5	–	3	6	–	6
Texas Southern	4	–	4	5	–	6
Prairie View A&M	3	–	5	5	–	7
Grambling State	2	–	6	5	–	7
Arkansas–Pine Bluff	2	–	6	3	–	9
Championship: Jackson State 41, Southern 13
$ – Conference champion; x – Division champion/co-champions; y – Championship game participant; Rankings from STATS Poll

The 2024 Arkansas–Pine Bluff Golden Lions football team represented the University of Arkansas at Pine Bluff as a member of the Southwestern Athletic Conference (SWAC) during the 2024 NCAA Division I FCS football season. The Golden Lions were coached by second-year head coach Alonzo Hampton and played at Simmons Bank Field in Pine Bluff, Arkansas.

== Schedule ==
Date	Time	Opponent	Site	TV	Result	Attendance
August 29	6:30 p.m.	at Arkansas*	War Memorial Stadium; Little Rock, AR	ESPNU	L 0–70	40,127
September 7	7:00 p.m.	Arkansas Baptist*	Simmons Bank Field; Pine Bluff, AR	SWAC DN	W 73–0	8,037
September 14	6:00 p.m.	vs. Tennessee State*	Simmons Bank Liberty Stadium; Memphis, TN (Southern Heritage Classic)	HBCU GO	L 28–41	27,584
September 21	6:00 p.m.	No. 8 Central Arkansas*	Simmons Bank Field; Pine Bluff, AR	SWAC DN	L 17–56	8,247
October 5	2:00 p.m.	at Alcorn State	Jack Spinks Stadium; Lorman, MS	HBCU GO	L 28–38	14,753
October 11	8:15 p.m.	Prairie View A&M	Simmons Bank Field; Pine Bluff, AR	ESPNU	W 21–17	5,673
October 19	2:00 p.m.	at Grambling State	Eddie G. Robinson Memorial Stadium; Grambling, LA	HBCU GO	L 21–31	17,135
October 26	2:00 p.m.	Mississippi Valley State^{†}	Simmons Bank Field; Pine Bluff, AR	SWAC DN	W 35–21	12,437
November 2	2:00 p.m.	at Jackson State	Mississippi Veterans Memorial Stadium; Jackson, MS	ESPN+	L 3–41	34,932
November 9	2:00 p.m.	Alabama A&M	Simmons Bank Field; Pine Bluff, AR	SWAC DN	L 24–52	3,182
November 16	2:00 p.m.	at Southern	A. W. Mumford Stadium; Baton Rouge, LA	JSN	L 9–31	17,740
November 23	2:00 p.m.	Texas Southern	Simmons Bank Field; Pine Bluff, AR	HBCO GO	L 23–31	3,723
*Non-conference game; ^{†}Homecoming; Rankings from STATS Poll released prior to the game; All times are in Central time

== Game summaries ==
=== at Arkansas (FBS) ===
Uniform Combination
Helmet	Jersey	Pants

Game One – Arkansas-Pine Bluff Golden Lions (0-0) at Arkansas Razorbacks (FBS) (0-0) – Game summary

Quarter	1	2	3	4	Total
Golden Lions	0	0	0	0	0
Razorbacks (FBS)	28	21	7	14	70

at War Memorial Stadium, Little Rock, AR

- Date: Thursday August 29, 2024
- Game time: 6:30 PM CST
- Game weather: Cloudy, 95 °F (35 °C)
- Game attendance: 40,127
- Referee: Lee Hedrick
- TV announcers (ESPNU): Jay Alter (play-by-play) and Rocky Boiman (analyst)
- Note: The third and fourth quarters were shortened to ten minutes each.

Game information

First quarter

- (12:08) Arkansas – Ja'Quinden Jackson 8-yard rush, Kyle Ramsey kick (Drive: 8 plays, 66 yards, 2:46; Arkansas 7–0)
- (8:16) Arkansas – Taylen Green 4-yard rush, Kyle Ramsey kick (Drive: 5 plays, 40 yards, 2:21; Arkansas 14–0)
- (5:03) Arkansas – Ja'Quinden Jackson 46-yard rush, Kyle Ramsey kick (Drive: 3 plays, 60 yards, 1:11; Arkansas 21–0)
- (1:12) Arkansas – Rodney Hill 4-yard rush, Kyle Ramsey kick (Drive: 7 plays, 40 yards, 2:05; Arkansas 28–0)

Second quarter

- (12:06) Arkansas – Tyrone Broden 9-yard pass from Taylen Green, Kyle Ramsey kick (Drive: 6 plays, 65 yards, 2:54; Arkansas 35–0)
- (5:37) Arkansas – Ty Washington 23-yard pass from Taylen Green, Kyle Ramsey kick (Drive: 6 plays, 81 yards, 3:09; Arkansas 42–0)
- (0:09) Arkansas – Taylen Green 36-yard rush, Kyle Ramsey kick (Drive: 7 plays, 77 yards, 1:33; Arkansas 49–0)

Third quarter

- (6:13) Arkansas – Braylen Russell 9-yard rush, Kyle Ramsey kick (Drive: 6 plays, 67 yards, 2:18; Arkansas 56–0)

Fourth quarter

- (8:14) Arkansas – Malachi Singleton 4-yard rush, Kyle Ramsey kick (Drive: 12 plays, 86 yards, 10:17; Arkansas 63–0)
- (0:36) Arkansas – Tyrell Reed Jr. 4-yard rush, Kyle Ramsey kick (Drive: 10 plays, 90 yards, 3:35; Arkansas 70–0)

Statistics	UAPB	ARK
First downs	10	34
Total yards	130	687
Rushing yards	7	279
Passing yards	123	408
Passing: Comp–Att–Int	11–23–0	28–37–0
Time of possession	27:45	32:15

Team	Category	Player	Statistics
Arkansas-Pine Bluff	Passing	Mekhi Hagens	11–23, 123 yards
Arkansas-Pine Bluff	Rushing	Oshawn Ross	5 carries, 13 yards
Arkansas-Pine Bluff	Receiving	Aramoni Rhone	2 receptions, 34 yards
Arkansas	Passing	Taylen Green	16–23, 229 yards, 2 TD
Arkansas	Rushing	Ja'Quinden Jackson	8 carries, 101 yards, 2 TD
Arkansas	Receiving	Isaac TeSlaa	3 receptions, 53 yards

=== Arkansas Baptist (NAIA) ===
Game Two – Arkansas Baptist Buffaloes (NAIA) (0–0) at Arkansas–Pine Bluff Golden Lions (0–1) – Game summary

Quarter	1	2	3	4	Total
Buffaloes (NAIA)	0	0	0	0	0
Golden Lions	28	24	7	14	73

at Simmons Bank Field • Pine Bluff, AR

- Date: September 7, 2024
- Game time: 7:00 p.m.
- Game weather: Sunny, 80 °F (27 °C)
- Game attendance: 8,037

Game information

First quarter

- (13:22) APB – Johness Davis 1-yard run, Trey Glymph kick (Drive: 4 plays, 41 yards, 1:30; Arkansas–Pine Bluff 7–0)
- (7:20) APB – Oshawn Ross 2-yard run, Trey Glymph kick (Drive: 6 plays, 86 yards, 2:39; Arkansas–Pine Bluff 14–0)
- (3:35) APB – Kareem Burke 43-yard run, Trey Glymph kick (Drive: 2 plays, 43 yards, 0:15; Arkansas–Pine Bluff 21–0)
- (1:18) APB – Oshawn Ross 32-yard run, Trey Glymph kick (Drive: 3 plays, 70 yards, 0:51; Arkansas–Pine Bluff 28–0)

Second quarter

- (12:27) APB – Johness Davis 22-yard run, Trey Glymph kick (Drive: 7 plays, 51 yards, 2:19; Arkansas–Pine Bluff 35–0)
- (8:47) APB – Oshawn Ross 54-yard run, Trey Glymph kick (Drive: 3 plays, 89 yards, 1:18; Arkansas–Pine Bluff 42–0)
- (1:58) APB – JaVonnie Gibson 54-yard pass from Mekhi Hagens, Braden Ducharme kick (Drive: 3 plays, 83 yards, 1:21; Arkansas–Pine Bluff 49–0)
- (0:00) APB – Braden Ducharme 38-yard field goal (Drive: 5 plays, 32 yards, 0:36; Arkansas–Pine Bluff 52–0)

Third quarter

- (7:25) APB – Donovan Giles 17-yard pass from Mekhi Hagens, Braden Ducharme kick (Drive: 5 plays, 28 yards, 2:24; Arkansas–Pine Bluff 59–0)

Fourth quarter

- (6:00) APB – Za'Marion Webber 2-yard run, Trey Glymph kick (Drive: 8 plays, 65 yards, 9:00; Arkansas–Pine Bluff 66–0)
- (4:28) APB – Landon Holcomb 15-yard run, Trey Glymph kick (Drive: 2 plays, 15 yards, 0:35; Arkansas–Pine Bluff 73–0)

Statistics	ARKB	UAPB
First downs	9	25
Total yards	160	670
Rushing yards	76	320
Passing yards	84	350
Passing: Comp–Att–Int	11–22–4	15–26–0
Time of possession	32:37	27:23

Team	Category	Player	Statistics
Arkansas Baptist	Passing	Tyler Strickland	11/21, 84 yards, 4 INT
Arkansas Baptist	Rushing	Chris Witherspoon	11 carries, 43 yards
Arkansas Baptist	Receiving	Tavion Rupert	3 receptions, 23 yards
Arkansas–Pine Bluff	Passing	Mekhi Hagens	15/22, 350 yards, 2 TD
Arkansas–Pine Bluff	Rushing	Oshawn Ross	5 carries, 100 yards, 3 TD
Arkansas–Pine Bluff	Receiving	JaVonnie Gibson	6 receptions, 172 yards, TD

=== vs Tennessee State ===
Game Three – Arkansas-Pine Bluff Golden Lions (1–1) at Tennessee State Tigers (1–1) – Game summary

Quarter	1	2	3	4	Total
Golden Lions	7	7	14	0	28
Tigers	10	21	7	3	41

at Simmons Bank Liberty Stadium • Memphis, TN

- Date: September 14, 2024
- Game time: 6:00 p.m.
- Game weather: Sunny
- Game attendance: 27,584
- Referee: Y.N. Myers
- TV announcers (HBCU GO): Charlie Neal (play-by-play), Jon Kelley (analyst) and Lawrencia Moten (sideline)

Game information

First quarter

- (12:37) UAP – JaVonnie Gibson 33-yard pass from Mekhi Hagens, Trey Glymph kick (Drive: 7 plays, 75 yards, 2:23; Arkansas–Pine Bluff 7–0)
- (8:15) TSU – James Lowery 25-yard field goal (Drive: 9 plays, 62 yards, 4:22; Arkansas–Pine Bluff 7–3)
- (0:52) TSU – Jalen Rouse 3-yard run, James Lowery kick (Drive: 3 plays, 17 yards, 0:47; Tennessee State 10–7)

Second quarter

- (12:29) TSU – Karate Brenson 22-yard pass from Draylen Ellis, James Lowery kick (Drive: 6 plays, 75 yards, 2:31; Tennessee State 17–7)
- (10:11) UAP – Daemon Dawkins 30-yard pass from Mekhi Hagens, Trey Glymph kick (Drive: 6 plays, 75 yards, 2:18; Tennessee State 17–14)
- (6:41) TSU – Jordan Gant 12-yard pass from Draylen Ellis, James Lowery kick (Drive: 8 plays, 45 yards, 3:19; Tennessee State 24–14)
- (1:39) TSU – Jalal Dean 4-yard pass from Draylen Ellis, James Lowery kick (Drive: 5 plays, 26 yards, 1:28; Tennessee State 31–14)

Third quarter

- (12:19) TSU – CJ Evans 38-yard run, James Lowery kick (Drive: 7 plays, 72 yards, 2:33; Tennessee State 38–14)
- (9:37) UAP – Kevin English 5-yard pass from Mekhi Hagens, Trey Glymph kick (Drive: 7 plays, 75 yards, 2:42; Tennessee State 38–21)
- (0:49) UAP – Oshawn Ross 2-yard run, Trey Glymph kick (Drive: 4 plays, 17 yards, 4:25; Tennessee State 38–28)

Fourth quarter

- (7:46) TSU – James Lowery 40-yard field goal (Drive: 9 plays, 25 yards, 3:44; Tennessee State 41–28)

Statistics	UAPB	TNST
First downs	16	24
Total yards	329	424
Rushing yards	53	196
Passing yards	276	228
Passing: Comp–Att–Int	15–31–0	20–33–0
Time of possession	25:25	31:37

Team	Category	Player	Statistics
Arkansas–Pine Bluff	Passing	Mekhi Hagens	15/31, 276 yards, 3 TD
Arkansas–Pine Bluff	Rushing	Oshawn Ross	16 carries, 51 yards, TD
Arkansas–Pine Bluff	Receiving	JaVonnie Gibson	5 receptions, 149 yards, TD
Tennessee State	Passing	Draylen Ellis	20/33, 228 yards, 3 TD
Tennessee State	Rushing	CJ Evans	9 carries, 63 yards, TD
Tennessee State	Receiving	Bryant Williams	5 receptions, 88 yards

=== No. 8 Central Arkansas ===
Game Four – No. 8 Central Arkansas Bears (2–1) at Arkansas–Pine Bluff Golden Lions (1–2) – Game summary

Quarter	1	2	3	4	Total
No. 8 Bears	0	0	0	0	0
Golden Lions	0	0	0	0	0

at Simmons Bank Field • Pine Bluff, AR

- Date: Saturday September 21, 2024
- Game time: 6:00 p.m.
- Game weather: 0 °F (−18 °C)
- TV announcers (TBD): TBD

Game information

First quarter
Second quarter
Third quarter
Fourth quarter

Statistics	UCA	UAPB
First downs		
Total yards		
Rushing yards		
Passing yards		
Passing: Comp–Att–Int		
Time of possession		

Team	Category	Player	Statistics
Central Arkansas	Passing		
Central Arkansas	Rushing		
Central Arkansas	Receiving		
Arkansas–Pine Bluff	Passing		
Arkansas–Pine Bluff	Rushing		
Arkansas–Pine Bluff	Receiving		

=== at Alcorn State ===
Game Five – Arkansas–Pine Bluff Golden Lions (1–2) vs Alcorn State Braves (2–3) – Game summary

Quarter	1	2	3	4	Total
Golden Lions	0	0	0	0	0
Braves	0	0	0	0	0

at Jack Spinks Stadium Lorman, MS

- Date: Saturday October 5, 2024
- Game time: 2:00 p.m.
- TV announcers: TBD

Game information

First quarter
Second quarter
Third quarter
Fourth quarter

Statistics	UAPB	ALCN
First downs		
Total yards		
Rushing yards		
Passing yards		
Passing: Comp–Att–Int		
Time of possession		

Team	Category	Player	Statistics
Arkansas–Pine Bluff	Passing		
Arkansas–Pine Bluff	Rushing		
Arkansas–Pine Bluff	Receiving		
Alcorn State	Passing		
Alcorn State	Rushing		
Alcorn State	Receiving		

=== Prairie View A&M ===
Game Six – Prairie View A&M Panthers (2–4) vs Arkansas–Pine Bluff Golden Lions (1–4) – Game summary

Quarter	1	2	3	4	Total
Panthers	0	0	0	0	0
Golden Lions	0	0	0	0	0

at Simmons Bank Field, Pine Bluff, AR

- Date: Friday October 11, 2024
- Game time: 8:15 p.m.
- TV announcers (ESPNU): Tiffany Greene (play-by-play) and Jay Walker (analyst)

Game information

First quarter
Second quarter
Third quarter
Fourth quarter

Statistics	PV	UAPB
First downs		
Total yards		
Rushing yards		
Passing yards		
Passing: Comp–Att–Int		
Time of possession		

Team	Category	Player	Statistics
Prairie View A&M	Passing		
Prairie View A&M	Rushing		
Prairie View A&M	Receiving		
Arkansas–Pine Bluff	Passing		
Arkansas–Pine Bluff	Rushing		
Arkansas–Pine Bluff	Receiving		

=== at Grambling State ===
Game Seven – Arkansas–Pine Bluff Golden Lions (2–4) at Grambling State Tigers (3–3) – Game summary

Quarter	1	2	3	4	Total
Golden Lions	0	0	0	0	0
Tigers	0	0	0	0	0

at Eddie G. Robinson Memorial Stadium, Grambling, LA

- Date: Saturday October 19, 2024
- Game time: 2:00 p.m.
- TV: HBCU Go

Game information

First quarter
Second quarter
Third quarter
Fourth quarter

Statistics	UAPB	GRAM
First downs		
Total yards		
Rushing yards		
Passing yards		
Passing: Comp–Att–Int		
Time of possession		

Team	Category	Player	Statistics
Arkansas–Pine Bluff	Passing		
Arkansas–Pine Bluff	Rushing		
Arkansas–Pine Bluff	Receiving		
Grambling State	Passing		
Grambling State	Rushing		
Grambling State	Receiving		

=== Mississippi Valley State ===
Game Eight – Mississippi Valley State Delta Devils (0–7) vs Arkansas–Pine Bluff Golden Lions (2–5) – Game summary

Quarter	1	2	3	4	Total
Delta Devils	0	0	0	0	0
Golden Lions	0	0	0	0	0

at Simmons Bank Field, Pine Bluff, AR

- Date: Saturday October 26, 2024
- Game time: 2:00 PM CST

Game information

First quarter
Second quarter
Third quarter
Fourth quarter

Statistics	MVSU	UAPB
First downs		
Total yards		
Rushing yards		
Passing yards		
Passing: Comp–Att–Int		
Time of possession		

Team	Category	Player	Statistics
Mississippi Valley State	Passing		
Mississippi Valley State	Rushing		
Mississippi Valley State	Receiving		
Arkansas–Pine Bluff	Passing		
Arkansas–Pine Bluff	Rushing		
Arkansas–Pine Bluff	Receiving		

=== at Jackson State ===
Game Nine – Arkansas–Pine Bluff Golden Lions (3–5) vs Jackson State Tigers (6–2) – Game summary

Quarter	1	2	3	4	Total
Golden Lions	0	0	0	0	0
Tigers	0	0	0	0	0

at Mississippi Veterans Memorial Stadium, Jackson, MS

- Date: Saturday November 2, 2024
- Game time: 2:00 p.m.
- TV: ESPN+

Game information

First quarter
Second quarter
Third quarter
Fourth quarter

Statistics	UAPB	JKST
First downs		
Total yards		
Rushing yards		
Passing yards		
Passing: Comp–Att–Int		
Time of possession		

Team	Category	Player	Statistics
Arkansas–Pine Bluff	Passing		
Arkansas–Pine Bluff	Rushing		
Arkansas–Pine Bluff	Receiving		
Jackson State	Passing		
Jackson State	Rushing		
Jackson State	Receiving		

=== Alabama A&M ===
Game Ten – Alabama A&M Bulldogs (3–5) vs Arkansas–Pine Bluff Golden Lions (3–6) – Game summary

Quarter	1	2	3	4	Total
Bulldogs	0	0	0	0	0
Golden Lions	0	0	0	0	0

at Simmons Bank Field, Pine Bluff, AR

- Date: Saturday November 9, 2024
- Game time: 2:00 PM CST

Game information

First quarter
Second quarter
Third quarter
Fourth quarter

Statistics	AAMU	UAPB
First downs		
Total yards		
Rushing yards		
Passing yards		
Passing: Comp–Att–Int		
Time of possession		

Team	Category	Player	Statistics
Alabama A&M	Passing		
Alabama A&M	Rushing		
Alabama A&M	Receiving		
Arkansas–Pine Bluff	Passing		
Arkansas–Pine Bluff	Rushing		
Arkansas–Pine Bluff	Receiving		

=== at Southern ===
Game Eleven – Arkansas–Pine Bluff Golden Lions (3–7) vs Southern Jaguars (6–4) – Game summary

Quarter	1	2	3	4	Total
Golden Lions	0	0	0	0	0
Jaguars	0	0	0	0	0

at A. W. Mumford Stadium, Baton Rouge, LA

- Date: Saturday November 16, 2024
- Game time: 2:00 p.m.
- TV announcers: TBD

Game information

First quarter
Second quarter
Third quarter
Fourth quarter

Statistics	UAPB	SOU
First downs		
Total yards		
Rushing yards		
Passing yards		
Passing: Comp–Att–Int		
Time of possession		

Team	Category	Player	Statistics
Arkansas–Pine Bluff	Passing		
Arkansas–Pine Bluff	Rushing		
Arkansas–Pine Bluff	Receiving		
Southern	Passing		
Southern	Rushing		
Southern	Receiving		

=== Texas Southern ===
Game Twelve – Texas Southern Tigers (4–6) vs Arkansas–Pine Bluff Golden Lions (3–8) – Game summary

Quarter	1	2	3	4	Total
Tigers	0	0	0	0	0
Golden Lions	0	0	0	0	0

at Simmons Bank Field, Pine Bluff, AR

- Date: Saturday November 23, 2024
- Game time: 2:00 p.m.

Game information

First quarter
Second quarter
Third quarter
Fourth quarter

Statistics	TXSO	UAPB
First downs		
Total yards		
Rushing yards		
Passing yards		
Passing: Comp–Att–Int		
Time of possession		

Team	Category	Player	Statistics
Texas Southern	Passing		
Texas Southern	Rushing		
Texas Southern	Receiving		
Arkansas–Pine Bluff	Passing		
Arkansas–Pine Bluff	Rushing		
Arkansas–Pine Bluff	Receiving		
