= 2024 Bethune–Cookman Wildcats football team =

American college football season

2024 Bethune–Cookman Wildcats football
- Conference: Southwestern Athletic Conference
- East Division
- Record: 2–10 (2–6 SWAC)
- Head coach: Raymond Woodie Jr. (2nd season)
- Co-offensive coordinators: Donte' Pimpleton (2nd season); Joe Gerbino (2nd season)
- Defensive coordinator: Robert Wimberly (2nd season)
- Home stadium: Daytona Stadium

2024 Southwestern Athletic Conference football standings
	Conf.			Overall
Team	W		L	W		L
East Division
No. 18 Jackson State xy$	8	–	1	12	–	2
Florida A&M	5	–	3	7	–	5
Alabama State	5	–	3	7	–	5
Alabama A&M	4	–	4	6	–	6
Bethune–Cookman	2	–	6	2	–	10
Mississippi Valley State	1	–	7	1	–	11
West Division
Southern xy	7	–	2	8	–	5
Alcorn State	5	–	3	6	–	6
Texas Southern	4	–	4	5	–	6
Prairie View A&M	3	–	5	5	–	7
Grambling State	2	–	6	5	–	7
Arkansas–Pine Bluff	2	–	6	3	–	9
Championship: Jackson State 41, Southern 13
$ – Conference champion; x – Division champion/co-champions; y – Championship game participant; Rankings from STATS Poll

The 2024 Bethune–Cookman Wildcats football team represented Bethune–Cookman University as a member of the Southwestern Athletic Conference (SWAC) during the 2024 NCAA Division I FCS football season. The Wildcats were coached by second-year head coach Raymond Woodie Jr. and played at Daytona Stadium in Daytona Beach, FL.

== Schedule ==
Date	Time	Opponent	Site	TV	Result	Attendance
August 31	7:00 p.m.	at South Florida*	Raymond James Stadium; Tampa, FL	ESPN+	L 3–48	36,694
September 7	3:00 p.m.	Mercer*	Daytona Stadium; Daytona Beach, FL	SWAC Digital	L 2–31	8,484
September 14	6:30 p.m.	at Western Michigan*	Waldo Stadium; Kalamazoo, MI	ESPN+	L 31–59	23,476
September 21	3:00 p.m.	Clark Atlanta*	Daytona Stadium; Daytona Beach, FL	HBCU GO	L 37–38	8,129
September 28	3:00 p.m.	Alabama State	Daytona Stadium; Daytona Beach, FL	HBCU GO	L 21–26	6,721
October 12	3:00 p.m.	at Alabama A&M	Louis Crews Stadium; Huntsville, AL	HBCU GO	L 12–56	19,727
October 19	3:00 p.m.	at Mississippi Valley State	Rice–Totten Stadium; Itta Bena, MS		W 20–10	9,321
October 26	3:00 p.m.	Jackson State^{†}	Daytona Stadium; Daytona Beach, FL	HBCU GO	L 17–37	10,877
November 2	3:00 p.m.	Grambling State	Daytona Stadium; Daytona Beach, FL	SWAC Digital	W 24–21	5,103
November 9	3:00 p.m.	at Southern	A. W. Mumford Stadium; Baton Rouge, LA		L 23–25 ^{5OT}	15,443
November 16	3:00 p.m.	at Texas Southern	Shell Energy Stadium; Houston, TX		L 14–17	6,916
November 23	3:30 p.m.	vs. Florida A&M	Camping World Stadium; Orlando, FL (Florida Classic)	ESPN+/ESPNU	L 38–41	56,453
*Non-conference game; ^{†}Homecoming; All times are in Eastern time

== Game summaries ==
=== at South Florida (FBS) ===
Game One – Bethune–Cookman Wildcats (0–0) at South Florida Bulls (FBS) (0–0) – Game summary

Quarter	1	2	3	4	Total
Wildcats	0	3	0	0	3
Bulls (FBS)	14	17	17	0	48

at Raymond James Stadium • Tampa, Florida

- Date: August 31st
- Game time: 7:00 p.m. EDT
- Game weather: Sunny • Temperature: 86 °F (30 °C) • Wind: NE at 5 miles per hour (8.0 km/h)
- Game attendance: 36,694
- Referee: James Jones
- TV announcers (ESPN+): AJ Ricketts (play-by-play) and Patrick Murray (analyst)

Game information

First quarter

- (6:21) USF – Byrum Brown 42 yard run, John Cannon kick (Drive: 11 plays, 82 yards, 2:50; South Florida 7–0)
- (3:59) USF – Kelley Joiner 2 yard run, John Cannon kick (Drive: 3 plays, 6 yards, 0:39; South Florida 14–0)

Second quarter

- (14:36) USF – Ta'Ron Keith 1 yard run, John Cannon kick (Drive: 8 plays, 48 yards, 2:53; South Florida 21–0)
- (4:39) USF – Nay'Quan Wright 1 yard run, John Cannon kick (Drive: 7 plays, 40 yards, 1:36; South Florida 28–0)
- (0:22) BCU – Cade Hechter 48 yard field goal (Drive: 12 plays, 44 yards, 4:17; South Florida 28–3)
- (0:00) USF – John Cannon 53 yard field goal (Drive: 3 plays, 29 yards, 0:19; South Florida 31–3)

Third quarter

- (10:00) USF – John Cannon 40 yard field goal (Drive: 7 plays, 40 yards, 2:43; South Florida 34–3)
- (5:00) USF – Kelley Joiner 4 yard run, Nico Gramatica kick (Drive: 5 plays, 69 yards, 1:20; South Florida 41–3)
- (2:19) USF – Michael Brown-Stephens 15 yard pass from Bryce Archie, Ty Ippolito kick (Drive: 1 play, 15 yards, 0:05; South Florida 48–3)

Fourth quarter

- No scoring plays

Statistics	BCU	USF
First downs	17	20
Plays–yards	74–170	69–403
Rushes–yards	41–48	46–231
Passing yards	122	172
Passing: Comp–Att–Int	17–33–2	15–23–0
Time of possession	37:40	22:20

Team	Category	Player	Statistics
Bethune–Cookman	Passing	Cam'Ron Ransom	12/19, 85 yards, 1 INT
Bethune–Cookman	Rushing	Courtney Reese	10 carries, 16 yards
Bethune–Cookman	Receiving	Lorenzo Jenkins	5 receptions, 53 yards
South Florida	Passing	Byrum Brown	13/20, 152 yards
South Florida	Rushing	Kelley Joiner	14 carries, 78 yards, 2 TD
South Florida	Receiving	Abdur-Rahmaan Yaseen	5 receptions, 73 yards

=== Mercer ===
Game Two – Mercer Bears (1–0) at Bethune–Cookman Wildcats (0–1) – Game summary

Quarter	1	2	3	4	Total
Bears	0	21	7	3	31
Wildcats	0	0	2	0	2

at Daytona Stadium • Daytona Beach, FL

- Date: September 7, 2024
- Game time: 3:00 p.m.
- Game weather: Sunny, 87 °F (31 °C)
- Game attendance: 8,484
- Referee: Charles Green
- TV announcers (SWAC Digital): Michael Trujillo, Johnny Vickers, Darryl Nattiel

Game information

First quarter

No scoring plays

Second quarter

- (6:06) MER – Brayden Smith 50-yard pass from D. J. Smith, Reice Griffin kick (Drive: 8 plays, 85 yards, 4:20; Mercer 7–0)
- (1:25) MER – Parker Wroble 14-yard pass from D. J. Smith, Reice Griffin kick (Drive: 6 plays, 55 yards, 2:26; Mercer 14–0)
- (1:02) MER – Kelin Parsons 35-yard pass from D. J. Smith, Reice Griffin kick (Drive: 1 play, 35 yards, 0:05; Mercer 21–0)

Third quarter

- (6:46) MER – Dwayne McGee 1-yard run, Reice Griffin kick (Drive: 11 plays, 94 yards, 5:52; Mercer 28–0)
- (3:32) BCU – Orin Patu 0-yard safety (Mercer 28–2)

Fourth quarter

- (3:35) MER – Reice Griffin 28-yard field goal (Drive: 9 plays, 44 yards, 4:11; Mercer 31–2)

Statistics	MER	BCU
First downs	26	10
Total yards	483	166
Rushing yards	239	29
Passing yards	244	137
Passing: Comp–Att–Int	19–25–1	14–29–1
Time of possession	33:46	26:14

Team	Category	Player	Statistics
Mercer	Passing	D. J. Smith	17/22, 237 yards, 3 TD, INT
Mercer	Rushing	Dwayne McGee	19 carries, 102 yards, TD
Mercer	Receiving	Brayden Smith	4 receptions, 85 yards, TD
Bethune–Cookman	Passing	Cam Ransom	14/29, 137 yards, INT
Bethune–Cookman	Rushing	Courtney Reese	11 carries, 20 yards
Bethune–Cookman	Receiving	Kobe Stewart	1 reception, 50 yards

=== at Western Michigan (FBS) ===
Game Three – Bethune–Cookman Wildcats (0–2) at Western Michigan Broncos (FBS) (0–2) – Game summary

Quarter	1	2	3	4	Total
Wildcats	0	14	7	10	31
Broncos (FBS)	14	21	14	10	59

at Waldo Stadium • Kalamazoo, MI

- Date: September 14, 2024
- Game time: 6:30 p.m.
- Game weather: Sunny • Temperature: 85 °F (29 °C) • Wind: E 8 miles per hour (13 km/h)
- Game attendance: 23,476
- Referee: David Siegle
- TV announcers (ESPN+): Noah Reed, Taylor McHargue

Game information

First quarter

- (14:43) WMU – Anthoyn Sambucci 54-yard pass from Hayden Wolff, Luka Zurak kick (Drive: 1 play, 54 yards, 0:17; Western Michigan 7–0)
- (2:52) WMU – Christopher Toudle 23-yard pass from Hayden Wolff, Luka Zurak kick (Drive: 4 plays, 65 yards, 1:43; Western Michigan 14–0)

Second quarter

- (13:48) WMU – Jaden Nixon 8-yard run, Luka Zurak kick (Drive: 5 plays, 55 yards, 1:54; Western Michigan 21–0)
- (8:48) WMU – Zahir Abdus-Salaam 8-yard run, Luka Zurak kick (Drive: 6 plays, 65 yards, 2:39; Western Michigan 28–0)
- (6:36) BCU – Cam Ransom 3-yard run, Cade Hechter kick (Drive: 6 plays, 75 yards, 2:12; Western Michigan 28–7)
- (0:59) WMU – Bugs Mortimer 38-yard pass from Hayden Wolff, Luka Zurak kick (Drive: 8 plays, 65 yards, 1:49; Western Michigan 35–7)
- (0:46) BCU – Darnell Deas 95-yard kickoff return, Cade Hechter kick (Western Michigan 35–14)

Third quarter

- (15:00) BCU – Darnell Deas 98-yard kickoff return, Cade Hechter kick (Western Michigan 35–21)
- (9:19) WMU – Jaden Nixon 37-yard run, Luka Zurak kick (Drive: 1 play, 37 yards, 0:08; Western Michigan 42–21)
- (4:33) WMU – Zahir Abdus-Salaam 1-yard run, Luka Zurak kick (Drive: 6 plays, 87 yards, 2:23; Western Michigan 49–21)

Fourth quarter

- (14:54) BCU – Cade Hechter 41-yard field goal (Drive: 12 plays, 52 yards, 4:39; Western Michigan 49–24)
- (11:03) WMU – Luka Zurak 20-yard field goal (Drive: 8 plays, 75 yards, 3:50; Western Michigan 52–24)
- (5:31) BCU – Cam Ransom 2-yard run, Cade Hechter kick (Drive: 10 plays, 75 yards, 5:32; Western Michigan 52–31)
- (2:39) WMU – Jamal Hailey 48-yard run, Luka Zurak kick (Drive: 5 plays, 76 yards, 2:52; Western Michigan 59–31)

Statistics	BCU	WMU
First downs	17	30
Total yards	255	677
Rushing yards	139	372
Passing yards	116	305
Passing: Comp–Att–Int	10–15-0	15–19–1
Time of possession	33:45	26:15

Team	Category	Player	Statistics
Bethune–Cookman	Passing	Cam Ransom	10/14, 116 yards
Bethune–Cookman	Rushing	Cam Ransom	20 carries, 44 yards, 2 TD
Bethune–Cookman	Receiving	Lorenzo Jenkins	1 reception, 44 yards
Western Michigan	Passing	Hayden Wolff	15/19, 305 yards, 3 TD, INT
Western Michigan	Rushing	Jaden Nixon	17 carries, 189 yards, 2 TD
Western Michigan	Receiving	Anthony Sambucci	4 receptions, 103 yards, TD

=== Clark Atlanta (DII) ===
Game Four – Clark Atlanta Panthers (DII) (2–0) at Bethune–Cookman Wildcats (0–3) – Game summary

Quarter	1	2	3	4	Total
Panthers (DII)	7	7	14	10	38
Wildcats	28	6	3	0	37

at Daytona Stadium • Daytona Beach, FL

- Date: September 21, 2024
- Game time: 3:00 p.m.
- Game weather: Sunny • Temperature: 84 °F (29 °C) • Wind: NE 11 miles per hour (18 km/h)
- Game attendance: 8,129
- Referee: Eric Bluntson
- TV announcers (HBCU GO): Charlie Neal, Jon Kelley, Lawrencia Moten

Game information

First quarter

- (10:27) BCU – Courtney Reese 29-yard pass from Cam Ransom, Cade Hechter kick (Drive: 10 plays, 71 yards, 4:33; Bethune–Cookman 7–0)
- (8:19) BCU – Cam Ransom 7-yard run, Cade Hechter kick (Drive: 2 plays, 7 yards, 0:33; Bethune–Cookman 14–0)
- (4:25) BCU – Darnell Deas 70-yard pass from Cam Ransom, Cade Hechter kick (Drive: 3 plays, 73 yards, 1:11; Bethune–Cookman 21–0)
- (2:24) CAU – David Martin 11-yard pass from David Wright III, Leonardo Cabrera kick (Drive: 4 plays, 57 yards, 1:54; Bethune–Cookman 21–7)
- (0:05) BCU – Kobe Stewart 54-yard pass from Cam Ransom, Cade Hechter kick (Drive: 5 plays, 77 yards, 2:13; Bethune–Cookman 28–7)

Second quarter

- (10:31) BCU – Cade Hechter 23-yard field goal (Drive: 8 plays, 38 yards, 3:39; Bethune–Cookman 31–7)
- (1:47) CAU – Delancey Tolliver 5-yard pass from Armone Harris, Leonardo Cabrera kick (Drive: 15 plays, 89 yards, 7:04; Bethune–Cookman 31–14)
- (0:00) BCU – Cade Hechter 27-yard field goal (Drive: 7 plays, 64 yards, 1:40; Bethune–Cookman 34–14)

Third quarter

- (8:31) CAU – Armone Harris 28-yard pass from David Wright III, Leonardo Cabrera kick (Drive: 9 plays, 98 yards, 3:32; Bethune–Cookman 34–21)
- (1:30) CAU – Armone Harris 27-yard pass from David Wright III, Leonardo Cabrera kick (Drive: 10 plays, 99 yards, 5:02; Bethune–Cookman 34–28)
- (0:23) BCU – Cade Hechter 37-yard field goal (Drive: 5 plays, 31 yards, 0:59; Bethune–Cookman 37–28)

Fourth quarter

- (4:12) CAU – Armone Harris 7-yard pass from David Wright III, Leonardo Cabrera kick (Drive: 7 plays, 62 yards, 3:49; Bethune–Cookman 37–35)
- (0:00) CAU – Leonardo Cabrera 55-yard field goal (Drive: 11 plays, 61 yards, 1:41; Clark Atlanta 38–37)

Statistics	CLA	BCU
First downs	28	17
Total yards	451	477
Rushing yards	72	95
Passing yards	379	382
Passing: Comp–Att–Int	31–50–1	22–32–0
Time of possession	37:23	22:37

Team	Category	Player	Statistics
Clark Atlanta	Passing	David Wright III	30/49, 374 yards, 4 TD, INT
Clark Atlanta	Rushing	David Martin	8 carries, 44 yards
Clark Atlanta	Receiving	Jamal Jones	10 receptions, 127 yards
Bethune–Cookman	Passing	Cam Ransom	22/31, 382 yards, 3 TD
Bethune–Cookman	Rushing	Cam Ransom	11 carries, 79 yards, TD
Bethune–Cookman	Receiving	Kobe Stewart	2 receptions, 79 yards, TD

=== Alabama State ===
Game Five – Alabama State Hornets (1–2) at Bethune–Cookman Wildcats (0–4) – Game summary

Quarter	1	2	3	4	Total
Hornets	0	0	0	0	0
Wildcats	0	0	0	0	0

at Daytona Stadium • Daytona Beach, FL

- Date: September 28, 2024
- Game time: 3:00 p.m.
- Game weather: 0 °F (−18 °C)
- TV announcers (HBCU GO): Charlie Neal, Jon Kelley, Lawrencia Moten

Game information

First quarter
Second quarter
Third quarter
Fourth quarter

Statistics	ALST	BCU
First downs		
Total yards		
Rushing yards		
Passing yards		
Passing: Comp–Att–Int		
Time of possession		

Team	Category	Player	Statistics
Alabama State	Passing		
Alabama State	Rushing		
Alabama State	Receiving		
Bethune–Cookman	Passing		
Bethune–Cookman	Rushing		
Bethune–Cookman	Receiving		

=== at Alabama A&M ===
Game Six – Bethune–Cookman Wildcats (0–5) at Alabama A&M Bulldogs (2–3) – Game summary

Quarter	1	2	3	4	Total
Wildcats	0	0	0	0	0
Bulldogs	0	0	0	0	0

at Louis Crews Stadium • Huntsville, AL

- Date: October 12, 2024
- Game time: 3:00 p.m.
- Game weather: 0 °F (−18 °C)
- TV announcers (HBCU GO): Charlie Neal, Jon Kelley, Lawrencia Moten

Game information

First quarter
Second quarter
Third quarter
Fourth quarter

Statistics	BCU	AAMU
First downs		
Total yards		
Rushing yards		
Passing yards		
Passing: Comp–Att–Int		
Time of possession		

Team	Category	Player	Statistics
Bethune–Cookman	Passing		
Bethune–Cookman	Rushing		
Bethune–Cookman	Receiving		
Alabama A&M	Passing		
Alabama A&M	Rushing		
Alabama A&M	Receiving		

=== at Mississippi Valley State ===
Game Seven – Bethune–Cookman Wildcats (0–6) at Mississippi Valley State Delta Devils (0–6) – Game summary

Quarter	1	2	3	4	Total
Wildcats	0	0	0	0	0
Delta Devils	0	0	0	0	0

at Rice–Totten Stadium • Itta Bena, MS

- Date: October 19, 2024
- Game time: 3:00 p.m.
- Game weather: 0 °F (−18 °C)
- TV announcers (ESPN+): Lee Hall, Darwin Cannon

Game information

First quarter
Second quarter
Third quarter
Fourth quarter

Statistics	BCU	MVSU
First downs		
Total yards		
Rushing yards		
Passing yards		
Passing: Comp–Att–Int		
Time of possession		

Team	Category	Player	Statistics
Bethune–Cookman	Passing		
Bethune–Cookman	Rushing		
Bethune–Cookman	Receiving		
Mississippi Valley State	Passing		
Mississippi Valley State	Rushing		
Mississippi Valley State	Receiving		

=== Jackson State ===
Game Eight – Jackson State Tigers (5–2) at Bethune–Cookman Wildcats (1–6) – Game summary

Quarter	1	2	3	4	Total
Tigers	0	0	0	0	0
Wildcats	0	0	0	0	0

at Daytona Stadium • Daytona Beach, FL

- Date: October 26, 2024
- Game time: 3:00 p.m.
- Game weather: 0 °F (−18 °C)
- TV announcers (HBCU GO): Charlie Neal, Jon Kelley, Lawrencia Moten

Game information

First quarter
Second quarter
Third quarter
Fourth quarter

Statistics	JKST	BCU
First downs		
Total yards		
Rushing yards		
Passing yards		
Passing: Comp–Att–Int		
Time of possession		

Team	Category	Player	Statistics
Jackson State	Passing		
Jackson State	Rushing		
Jackson State	Receiving		
Bethune–Cookman	Passing		
Bethune–Cookman	Rushing		
Bethune–Cookman	Receiving		

=== Grambling State ===
Game Nine – Grambling State Tigers (4–4) at Bethune–Cookman Wildcats (1–7) – Game summary

Quarter	1	2	3	4	Total
Tigers	0	0	0	0	0
Wildcats	0	0	0	0	0

at Daytona Stadium • Daytona Beach, FL

- Date: November 2, 2024
- Game time: 3:00 p.m.
- Game weather: 0 °F (−18 °C)
- TV announcers (HBCU GO): Michael Trujillo, Johnny Vickers, Darryl Nattiel

Game information

First quarter
Second quarter
Third quarter
Fourth quarter

Statistics	GRAM	BCU
First downs		
Total yards		
Rushing yards		
Passing yards		
Passing: Comp–Att–Int		
Time of possession		

Team	Category	Player	Statistics
Grambling State	Passing		
Grambling State	Rushing		
Grambling State	Receiving		
Bethune–Cookman	Passing		
Bethune–Cookman	Rushing		
Bethune–Cookman	Receiving		

=== at Southern ===
Game Ten – Bethune–Cookman Wildcats (2–7) vs Southern Jaguars (5–4) – Game summary

Quarter	1	2	3	4	Total
Wildcats	0	0	0	0	0
Jaguars	0	0	0	0	0

at A. W. Mumford Stadium • Baton Rouge, LA

- Date: November 9, 2024
- Game time: 3:00 p.m.
- TV announcers (ESPN+): Chris Powers

Game information

First quarter
Second quarter
Third quarter
Fourth quarter

Statistics	BCU	SOU
First downs		
Total yards		
Rushing yards		
Passing yards		
Passing: Comp–Att–Int		
Time of possession		

Team	Category	Player	Statistics
Bethune–Cookman	Passing		
Bethune–Cookman	Rushing		
Bethune–Cookman	Receiving		
Southern	Passing		
Southern	Rushing		
Southern	Receiving		

=== at Texas Southern ===
Game Eleven – Bethune–Cookman Wildcats (2–8) vs Texas Southern Tigers (3–6) – Game summary

Quarter	1	2	3	4	Total
Wildcats	0	0	0	0	0
Tigers	0	0	0	0	0

at Shell Energy Stadium, Houston, Texas

- Date: Saturday November 16, 2024
- Game time: 3:00 p.m.
- TV announcers (ESPN+): Charles Bishop, Charles Porter

Game information

First quarter
Second quarter
Third quarter
Fourth quarter

Statistics	BCU	TXSO
First downs		
Total yards		
Rushing yards		
Passing yards		
Passing: Comp–Att–Int		
Time of possession		

Team	Category	Player	Statistics
Bethune–Cookman	Passing		
Bethune–Cookman	Rushing		
Bethune–Cookman	Receiving		
Texas Southern	Passing		
Texas Southern	Rushing		
Texas Southern	Receiving		

=== vs. Florida A&M (Florida Classic) ===
Game Twelve – Florida A&M Rattlers (5–5) vs. Bethune–Cookman Wildcats (2–9) – Game summary

Quarter	1	2	3	4	Total
Rattlers	0	0	0	0	0
Wildcats	0	0	0	0	0

at Camping World Stadium • Orlando, FL

- Date: November 23, 2024
- Game time: 3:30 p.m.
- Game weather: 0 °F (−18 °C)
- TV announcers (ESPN+/ESPNU): Tiffany Greene (play-by-play) and Jay Walker (analyst)

Game information

First quarter
Second quarter
Third quarter
Fourth quarter

Statistics	FAMU	BCU
First downs		
Total yards		
Rushing yards		
Passing yards		
Passing: Comp–Att–Int		
Time of possession		

Team	Category	Player	Statistics
Florida A&M	Passing		
Florida A&M	Rushing		
Florida A&M	Receiving		
Bethune–Cookman	Passing		
Bethune–Cookman	Rushing		
Bethune–Cookman	Receiving		
