= Terrence Graves (American football) =

American football coach (born 1968)

Biographical details
- Born: November 18, 1968 (age 57); Norfolk, Virginia, U.S.
- Education: Winston-Salem State University (1994); Southern University (2003); Grambling State University (2021)

Playing career
- 1989: Wake Forest
- 1990–1992: Winston-Salem State
- Position: Defensive back

Coaching career (HC unless noted)
- 1993: Winston-Salem State (DB)
- 1994–1995: Southern (GA)
- 1996–1998: Southern (ST/LB)
- 2000–2002: Southern (co-DC)
- 2003: Norfolk State (DC/LB)
- 2004–2009: Southern (DC/LB)
- 2010–2013: Mississippi Valley State (AHC/LB)
- 2014–2021: Grambling State (ST/LB)
- 2021: Grambling State (interim HC)
- 2022: Grambling State (ST/LB)
- 2023: Southern (AHC/ST/LB)
- 2023: Southern (interim HC)
- 2024–2025: Southern

Head coaching record
- Overall: 11–11

Accomplishments and honors

Championships
- SWAC West Division (2024)

Awards
- First-team All-CIAA (1992)

Terrence C. Graves (born November 18, 1968) is an American college football coach. He was the head football coach for Southern University, a position he held from 2023 to 2025. He was the interim head football coach for Grambling State University in 2021. He also coached for Winston-Salem State, Norfolk State, and Mississippi Valley State. He played college football for Wake Forest and Winston-Salem State as a defensive back.

== Head coaching record ==
Year	Team	Overall	Conference	Standing	Bowl/playoffs
Grambling State Tigers (Southwestern Athletic Conference) (2021)
2021	Grambling State	1–0 (Note: Graves was named interim head coach with one week remaining in the season following the firing of Broderick Fobbs.)	1–0	T–3rd (West)	
Grambling State:		1–0	1–0		
Southern Jaguars (Southwestern Athletic Conference) (2023–2025)
2023	Southern	1–0 (Note: Graves was named interim head coach with one week remaining in the season following the firing of Eric Dooley.)	1–0	3rd (West)	
2024	Southern	8–5	6–1	1st (West)	
2025	Southern	1–6	0–3	(West)	
Southern:		10–11	7–4		
Total:		11–11			
