= 2024 Alcorn State Braves football team =

American college football season

2024 Alcorn State Braves football
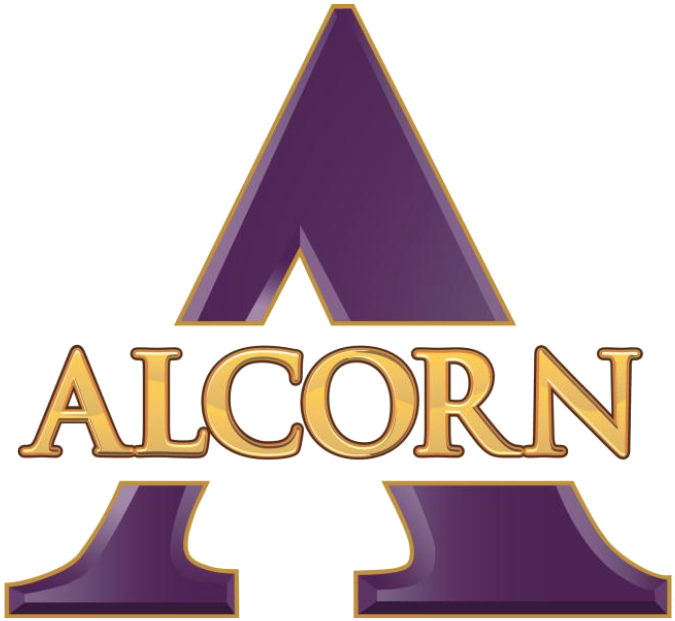
- Conference: Southwestern Athletic Conference
- West Division
- Record: 6–6 (5–3 SWAC)
- Head coach: Cedric Thomas (1st season)
- Offensive coordinator: Jermaine Gales (1st season)
- Co-defensive coordinators: Derek Welch (1st season); Deion Roberson (1st season)
- Home stadium: Jack Spinks Stadium

2024 Southwestern Athletic Conference football standings
	Conf.			Overall
Team	W		L	W		L
East Division
No. 18 Jackson State xy$	8	–	1	12	–	2
Florida A&M	5	–	3	7	–	5
Alabama State	5	–	3	7	–	5
Alabama A&M	4	–	4	6	–	6
Bethune–Cookman	2	–	6	2	–	10
Mississippi Valley State	1	–	7	1	–	11
West Division
Southern xy	7	–	2	8	–	5
Alcorn State	5	–	3	6	–	6
Texas Southern	4	–	4	5	–	6
Prairie View A&M	3	–	5	5	–	7
Grambling State	2	–	6	5	–	7
Arkansas–Pine Bluff	2	–	6	3	–	9
Championship: Jackson State 41, Southern 13
$ – Conference champion; x – Division champion/co-champions; y – Championship game participant; Rankings from STATS Poll

The 2024 Alcorn State Braves football team represented Alcorn State University as a member of the Southwestern Athletic Conference (SWAC) during the 2024 NCAA Division I FCS football season. The Braves were coached by first-year head coach Cedric Thomas and played at Jack Spinks Stadium in Lorman, Mississippi.

== Schedule ==
Date	Time	Opponent	Site	TV	Result	Attendance
August 29	7:00 p.m.	at UAB*	Protective Stadium; Birmingham, AL	ESPN+	L 3–41	21,267
September 7	6:30 p.m.	at Vanderbilt*	FirstBank Stadium; Nashville, TN	ESPNU	L 0–55	24,080
September 14	6:00 p.m.	Edward Waters*	Jack Spinks Stadium; Lorman, MS		W 38–7	6,148
September 21	7:00 p.m.	at McNeese*	Cowboy Stadium; Lake Charles, LA	ESPN+	L 14–42	10,252
September 28	6:00 p.m.	at Mississippi Valley State	Rice–Totten Stadium; Itta Bena, MS		W 42–21	7,834
October 5	2:00 p.m.	Arkansas–Pine Bluff^{†}	Jack Spinks Stadium; Lorman, MS		W 38–28	14,753
October 12	2:00 p.m.	at Grambling State	Eddie G. Robinson Memorial Stadium; Grambling, LA	ESPN+	W 17–15	7,580
October 19	6:00 p.m.	at Southern	A. W. Mumford Stadium; Baton Rouge, LA		L 14–24	26,685
November 2	4:00 p.m.	vs. Alabama State	Ladd–Peebles Stadium; Mobile, AL (Port City Classic)	ESPN+	L 17–21	7,831
November 9	2:00 p.m.	Texas Southern	Jack Spinks Stadium; Lorman, MS		W 42–21	2,112
November 16	2:00 p.m.	at Prairie View A&M	Panther Stadium; Prairie View, TX		W 26–13	4,869
November 23	2:00 p.m.	No. 20 Jackson State	Jack Spinks Stadium; Lorman, MS (Soul Bowl)	ESPN+	L 10–48	22,617
*Non-conference game; ^{†}Homecoming; Rankings from STATS Poll released prior to the game; All times are in Central time

== Game summaries ==
=== at UAB (FBS) ===
Game One – Alcorn State Braves (0-0) at UAB Blazers (FBS) (0-0) – Game summary

Quarter	1	2	3	4	Total
Braves	3	0	0	0	3
Blazers (FBS)	14	14	3	10	41

at Protective Stadium • Birmingham, AL

- Date: August 29
- Game time: 8:00 p.m.
- Game weather: Cloudy • Temperature: 85 °F (29 °C) • Wind: SE at 5 miles per hour (8.0 km/h)
- Game attendance: 21,267
- Referee: Edwin Lee
- TV announcers (ESPN+): Nate Gatter (play-by-play) and Jay Sonnhalter (analyst)

Game information

First quarter

- (10:10) UAB – Lee Beebe Jr. 2-yard run (Jonah Delange kick) (Drive: 11 plays, 70 yards, 4:44; UAB 7-0)
- (7:56) UAB – Brandon Hawkins Jr. 9-yard pass from Jacob Zeno (Jonah Delange kick) (3 plays, 6 yards, 0:38; UAB 14-0)
- (2:36) ALCN – Noah Kiani 29-yard field goal (Drive: 6 plays, 19 yards, 3:00; UAB 14-3)

Second quarter

- (6:26) UAB – Amare Thomas 15-yard pass from Jacob Zeno (Jonah Delange kick) (Drive: 6 plays, 17 yards, 3:12; UAB 21-3)
- (1:30) UAB – Lee Beebe Jr. 2-yard run (Jonah Delange kick) (Drive: 7 plays, 75 yards, 1:55; UAB 28-3)

Third quarter

- (11:26) UAB – Jonah Delange 41-yard field goal (Drive: 9 plays, 37 yards, 2:20; UAB 31-3)

Fourth quarter

- (12:24) UAB – Jonah Delange 24-yard field goal (Drive: 13 plays, 75 yards, 4:31; UAB 34-3)
- (11:49) UAB – Kam Shanks 57-yard punt return (Jonah Delange kick) (UAB 41-3)

Statistics	ALCN	UAB
First downs	12	32
Total yards	61–177	86–517
Rushing yards	40–117	53–302
Passing yards	60	215
Passing: Comp–Att–Int	9–21–1	23–33–1
Time of possession	28:32	31:28

Team	Category	Player	Statistics
Alcorn State	Passing	Roderick Hartsfield	1/2, 31 yards
Alcorn State	Rushing	Tyler Macon	12 carries, 37 yards
Alcorn State	Receiving	Deablo McGee	1 reception, 31 yards
UAB	Passing	Jacob Zeno	23/33, 215 yards, 2 TD, INT
UAB	Rushing	Lee Beebe Jr.	15 carries, 82 yards, 2 TD
UAB	Receiving	Kam Shanks	6 receptions, 73 yards

=== at Vanderbilt (FBS) ===
Game Two – Alcorn State Braves (0–1) vs Vanderbilt Commodores (FBS) (1–0) – Game summary

Quarter	1	2	3	4	Total
Braves	0	0	0	0	0
Commodores (FBS)	10	17	7	21	55

at FirstBank Stadium, Nashville, Tennessee

- Date: Saturday September 7, 2024
- Game time: 6:30 p.m.
- Game weather: Sunny • Temperature: 74 °F (23 °C) • Wind: NE at 10 miles per hour (16 km/h)
- Game attendance: 24,080
- Referee: Daniel Dautreaux
- TV announcers (ESPNU): Kevin Fitzgerald (play-by-play) and Charlie Strong (analyst)

Game information

First quarter

- (5:15) VU – Brock Taylor 35-yard field goal (Drive: 12 plays, 53 yards, 7:55; Vanderbilt 3–0)
- (2:40) VU – Cole Spence 17-yard pass from Eli Stowers, Brock Taylor kick (Drive: 1 play, 17 yards, 0:06; Vanderbilt 10–0)

Second quarter

- (9:26) VU – Diego Pavia 5-yard run, Brock Taylor kick (Drive: 7 plays, 46 yards, 4:20; Vanderbilt 17–0)
- (5:02) VU – Sedrick Alexander 2-yard run, Brock Taylor kick (Drive: 6 plays, 34 yards, 3:12; Vanderbilt 24–0)
- (0:05) VU – Brock Taylor 46-yard field goal (Drive: 10 plays, 27 yards, 2:20; Vanderbilt 27–0)

Third quarter

- (2:37) VU – AJ Newberry 20-yard run, Brock Taylor kick (Drive: 6 plays, 52 yards, 3:54; Vanderbilt 34–0)

Fourth quarter

- (14:06) VU – Nate Johnson 56-yard run, Brock Taylor kick (Drive: 1 play, 56 yards, 0:10; Vanderbilt 41–0)
- (12:17) VU – Martel Hight 57-yard punt return, Brock Taylor kick (Vanderbilt 48–0)
- (12:11) VU – Alan Wright 18-yard interception, Brock Taylor kick (Vanderbilt 55–0)

Statistics	ALCN	VAN
First downs	6	18
Total yards	71	342
Rushing yards	40	242
Passing yards	31	100
Passing: Comp–Att–Int	8–16–2	11–14–0
Time of possession	28:57	31:03

Team	Category	Player	Statistics
Alcorn State	Passing	Xzavier Vaughn	5/9, 20 yards
Alcorn State	Rushing	Cameron Stewart	10 carries, 29 yards
Alcorn State	Receiving	Tavarious Griffin	2 receptions, 14 yards
Vanderbilt	Passing	Diego Pavia	10/13, 83 yards
Vanderbilt	Rushing	Nate Johnson	2 carries, 69 yards, TD
Vanderbilt	Receiving	Tristen Brown	3 receptions, 27 yards

=== Edward Waters (DII) ===
Game Three – Edward Waters Tigers (DII) (1–1) vs Alcorn State Braves (0–2) – Game summary

Quarter	1	2	3	4	Total
Tigers (DII)	0	0	0	7	7
Braves	3	7	14	14	38

at Jack Spinks Stadium Lorman, MS

- Date: Saturday September 14, 2024
- Game time: 6:00 p.m.
- Game weather: Cloudy
- Game attendance: 6,148
- Referee: Tony Ross
- TV announcers (Braves All Access): TBD

Game information

First quarter

- (10:10) ALC – Noah Kiani 30-yard field goal (Drive: 8 plays, 39 yards, 2:48; Alcorn State 3–0)

Second quarter

- (2:18) ALC – Xzavier Vaughn 1-yard run, Noah Kiani kick (Drive: 8 plays, 81 yards, 3:47; Alcorn State 10–0)

Third quarter

- (11:31) ALC – Xzavier Vaughn 13-yard run, Noah Kiani kick (Drive: 8 plays, 74 yards, 3:22; Alcorn State 17–0)
- (9:20) ALC – Xzavier Vaughn 1-yard run, Noah Kiani kick (Drive: 2 plays, 47 yards, 0:37; Alcorn State 24–0)

Fourth quarter

- (13:17) ALC – Xzavier Vaughn 24-yard run, Noah Kiani kick (Drive: 10 plays, 84 yards, 3:42; Alcorn State 31–0)
- (11:16) ALC – Tyler Macon 12-yard run, Noah Kiani kick (Drive: 1 play, 12 yards, 0:16; Alcorn State 38–0)
- (7:13) EWC – Kentrelle Williams 2-yard run, Cooper Badics kick (Drive: 7 plays, 78 yards, 3:56; Alcorn State 38–7)

Statistics	EAU	ALCN
First downs	16	23
Total yards	240	423
Rushing yards	139	168
Passing yards	101	255
Passing: Comp–Att–Int	9–16–2	19–28–2
Time of possession	32:57	27:03

Team	Category	Player	Statistics
Edward Waters	Passing	Keith Moore II	8/15, 64 yards, 2 INT
Edward Waters	Rushing	Keith Moore II	13 carries, 44 yards
Edward Waters	Receiving	Deven Thompson	3 receptions, 57 yards
Alcorn State	Passing	Xzavier Vaughn	18/26, 255 yards
Alcorn State	Rushing	Xzavier Vaughn	12 carries, 96 yards, 4 TD
Alcorn State	Receiving	Tyran Warren	4 receptions, 97 yards

=== at McNeese ===
Game Four – Alcorn State Braves (1–2) vs McNeese Cowboys (2–2) – Game summary

Quarter	1	2	3	4	Total
Braves	0	7	7	0	14
Cowboys	21	7	14	0	42

at Cowboy Stadium, Lake Charles, Louisiana

- Date: Saturday September 21, 2024
- Game time: 7:00 p.m.
- Game weather: Sunny • Temperature: 88 °F (31 °C) • Wind: SE at 7 miles per hour (11 km/h)
- Game attendance: 10,252
- Referee: Tim Davis
- TV announcers (ESPN+): Jeff Palermo (play-by-play) and Chaston Tavares (analyst)

Game information

First quarter

- (14:11) MCN – Kameran Senegal 50-yard pass from Clifton McDowell, Tyler Larco kick (Drive: 1 play, 50 yards, 0:08; McNeese 7–0)
- (8:30) MCN – Joshon Barbie 5-yard run, Tyler Larco kick (Drive: 5 plays, 65 yards, 1:16; McNeese 14–0)
- (1:18) MCN – Jaylen Jackson 0-yard punt return, Tyler Larco kick (McNeese 21–0)

Second quarter

- (0:40) ALC – Tyran Warren 32-yard pass from Xzavier Vaughn, Noah Kiani kick (Drive: 7 plays, 60 yards, 1:13; McNeese 21–7)
- (0:03) MCN – D'Angelo Durham 2-yard run, Tyler Larco kick (Drive: 5 plays, 54 yards, 0:31; McNeese 28–7)

Third quarter

- (7:53) MCN – Clifton McDowell 14-yard run, Tyler Larco kick (Drive: 4 plays, 48 yards, 1:28; McNeese 35–7)
- (4:02) ALC – Xzavier Vaughn 25-yard run, Noah Kiani kick (Drive: 8 plays, 75 yards, 3:51; McNeese 35–14)
- (2:13) MCN – Jer'Michael Carter 5-yard pass from Clifton McDowell, Tyler Larco kick (Drive: 4 plays, 34 yards, 1:49; McNeese 42–14)

Fourth quarter

No scoring plays

Statistics	ALCN	MCN
First downs	21	21
Total yards	421	457
Rushing yards	217	211
Passing yards	204	246
Passing: Comp–Att–Int	16–41–1	16–23–1
Time of possession	33:19	26:41

Team	Category	Player	Statistics
Alcorn State	Passing	Xzavier Vaughn	16/41, 204 yards, TD, INT
Alcorn State	Rushing	Xzavier Vaughn	16 carries, 127 yards, TD
Alcorn State	Receiving	Damien Jones	7 receptions, 105 yards
McNeese	Passing	Clifton McDowell	15/21, 229 yards, 2 TD, INT
McNeese	Rushing	Clifton McDowell	8 carries, 76 yards, TD
McNeese	Receiving	Jonathan Harris	5 receptions, 60 yards

=== at Mississippi Valley State ===
Game Five – Alcorn State Braves (1–3) at Mississippi Valley State Delta Devils (0–4) – Game summary

Quarter	1	2	3	4	Total
Braves	0	0	0	0	0
Delta Devils	0	0	0	0	0

at Rice–Totten Stadium, Itta Bena, Mississippi

- Date: Saturday September 28, 2024
- Game time: 6:00 p.m.

Game information

First quarter
Second quarter
Third quarter
Fourth quarter

Statistics	ALCN	MVSU
First downs		
Total yards		
Rushing yards		
Passing yards		
Turnovers		
Time of possession		

Team	Category	Player	Statistics
Alcorn State	Passing		
Alcorn State	Rushing		
Alcorn State	Receiving		
Mississippi Valley State	Passing		
Mississippi Valley State	Rushing		
Mississippi Valley State	Receiving		

=== Arkansas–Pine Bluff ===
Game Six – Arkansas–Pine Bluff Golden Lions (1–2) vs Alcorn State Braves (2–3) – Game summary

Quarter	1	2	3	4	Total
Golden Lions	0	0	0	0	0
Braves	0	0	0	0	0

at Jack Spinks Stadium Lorman, MS

- Date: Saturday October 5, 2024
- Game time: 2:00 p.m.
- TV announcers: TBD

Game information

First quarter
Second quarter
Third quarter
Fourth quarter

Statistics	UAPB	ALCN
First downs		
Total yards		
Rushing yards		
Passing yards		
Passing: Comp–Att–Int		
Time of possession		

Team	Category	Player	Statistics
Arkansas–Pine Bluff	Passing		
Arkansas–Pine Bluff	Rushing		
Arkansas–Pine Bluff	Receiving		
Alcorn State	Passing		
Alcorn State	Rushing		
Alcorn State	Receiving		

=== at Grambling State ===
Game Seven – Alcorn State Braves (3–3) at Grambling State Tigers (3–2) – Game summary

Quarter	1	2	3	4	Total
Braves	0	0	0	0	0
Tigers	0	0	0	0	0

at Eddie G. Robinson Memorial Stadium, Grambling, LA

- Date: Saturday October 12, 2024
- Game time: 2:00 p.m.
- TV: ESPN+

Game information

First quarter
Second quarter
Third quarter
Fourth quarter

Statistics	ALCN	GRAM
First downs		
Total yards		
Rushing yards		
Passing yards		
Passing: Comp–Att–Int		
Time of possession		

Team	Category	Player	Statistics
Alcorn State	Passing		
Alcorn State	Rushing		
Alcorn State	Receiving		
Grambling State	Passing		
Grambling State	Rushing		
Grambling State	Receiving		

=== at Southern ===
Game Eight – Alcorn State Braves (4–3) vs Southern Jaguars (3–3) – Game summary

Quarter	1	2	3	4	Total
Braves	0	0	0	0	0
Jaguars	0	0	0	0	0

at A. W. Mumford Stadium, Baton Rouge, LA

- Date: Saturday October 19, 2024
- Game time: 6:00 p.m.
- TV: ESPN+

Game information

First quarter
Second quarter
Third quarter
Fourth quarter

Statistics	ALCN	SOU
First downs		
Total yards		
Rushing yards		
Passing yards		
Passing: Comp–Att–Int		
Time of possession		

Team	Category	Player	Statistics
Alcorn State	Passing		
Alcorn State	Rushing		
Alcorn State	Receiving		
Southern	Passing		
Southern	Rushing		
Southern	Receiving		

=== vs. Alabama State ===
Game Nine – Alcorn State Braves (4–4) vs Alabama State Hornets (4–3) – Game summary

Quarter	1	2	3	4	Total
Braves	0	0	0	0	0
Hornets	0	0	0	0	0

at Ladd–Peebles Stadium, Mobile, AL

- Date: Saturday November 2, 2024
- Game time: 4:00 p.m.
- TV: ESPN+

Game information

First quarter
Second quarter
Third quarter
Fourth quarter

Statistics	ALCN	ALST
First downs		
Total yards		
Rushing yards		
Passing yards		
Passing: Comp–Att–Int		
Time of possession		

Team	Category	Player	Statistics
Alcorn State	Passing		
Alcorn State	Rushing		
Alcorn State	Receiving		
Alabama State	Passing		
Alabama State	Rushing		
Alabama State	Receiving		

=== Texas Southern ===
Game Ten – Texas Southern Tigers (3–5) vs Alcorn State Braves (4–5) – Game summary

Quarter	1	2	3	4	Total
Tigers	0	0	0	0	0
Braves	0	0	0	0	0

at Jack Spinks Stadium, Lorman, MS

- Date: Saturday November 9, 2024
- Game time: 2:00 p.m.

Game information

First quarter
Second quarter
Third quarter
Fourth quarter

Statistics	TXSO	ALCN
First downs		
Total yards		
Rushing yards		
Passing yards		
Passing: Comp–Att–Int		
Time of possession		

Team	Category	Player	Statistics
Texas Southern	Passing		
Texas Southern	Rushing		
Texas Southern	Receiving		
Alcorn State	Passing		
Alcorn State	Rushing		
Alcorn State	Receiving		

=== at Prairie View A&M ===
Game Eleven – Alcorn State Braves (5–5) vs Prairie View A&M Panthers (5–5) – Game summary

Quarter	1	2	3	4	Total
Braves	0	0	0	0	0
Panthers	0	0	0	0	0

at Panther Stadium, Prairie View, TX

- Date: Saturday November 16, 2024
- Game time: 2:00 p.m.
- TV: ESPN+

Game information

First quarter
Second quarter
Third quarter
Fourth quarter

Statistics	ALCN	PV
First downs		
Total yards		
Rushing yards		
Passing yards		
Passing: Comp–Att–Int		
Time of possession		

Team	Category	Player	Statistics
Alcorn State	Passing		
Alcorn State	Rushing		
Alcorn State	Receiving		
Prairie View A&M	Passing		
Prairie View A&M	Rushing		
Prairie View A&M	Receiving		

=== No. 20 Jackson State (Soul Bowl) ===
Game Twelve – No. 20 Jackson State Tigers (9–2) vs Alcorn State Braves (6–5) – Game summary

Quarter	1	2	3	4	Total
No. 20 Tigers	0	0	0	0	0
Braves	0	0	0	0	0

at Jack Spinks Stadium, Lorman, MS

- Date: Saturday November 23, 2024
- Game time: 2:00 PM CST
- TV: ESPN+

Game information

First quarter
Second quarter
Third quarter
Fourth quarter

Statistics	JKST	ALCN
First downs		
Total yards		
Rushing yards		
Passing yards		
Passing: Comp–Att–Int		
Time of possession		

Team	Category	Player	Statistics
Jackson State	Passing		
Jackson State	Rushing		
Jackson State	Receiving		
Alcorn State	Passing		
Alcorn State	Rushing		
Alcorn State	Receiving		
