= 2024 Mississippi Valley State Delta Devils football team =

American college football season

2024 Mississippi Valley State Delta Devils football
- Conference: Southwestern Athletic Conference
- East Division
- Record: 1–11 (1–7 SWAC)
- Head coach: Kendrick Wade (2nd season)
- Offensive coordinator: Eli Johnson (2nd season)
- Defensive coordinator: Jesse Thompson (2nd season)
- Home stadium: Rice–Totten Stadium

2024 Southwestern Athletic Conference football standings
| | Conf. | | | Overall |
| Team | W | | L | W | | L |
|---|---|---|---|---|---|---|
East Division
| No. 18 Jackson State xy$ | 8 | – | 1 | 12 | – | 2 |
| Florida A&M | 5 | – | 3 | 7 | – | 5 |
| Alabama State | 5 | – | 3 | 7 | – | 5 |
| Alabama A&M | 4 | – | 4 | 6 | – | 6 |
| Bethune–Cookman | 2 | – | 6 | 2 | – | 10 |
| Mississippi Valley State | 1 | – | 7 | 1 | – | 11 |
West Division
| Southern xy | 7 | – | 2 | 8 | – | 5 |
| Alcorn State | 5 | – | 3 | 6 | – | 6 |
| Texas Southern | 4 | – | 4 | 5 | – | 6 |
| Prairie View A&M | 3 | – | 5 | 5 | – | 7 |
| Grambling State | 2 | – | 6 | 5 | – | 7 |
| Arkansas–Pine Bluff | 2 | – | 6 | 3 | – | 9 |
Championship: Jackson State 41, Southern 13
$ – Conference champion; x – Division champion/co-champions; y – Championship game participant; Rankings from STATS Poll

The 2024 Mississippi Valley State Delta Devils football team represented Mississippi Valley State University as a member of the Southwestern Athletic Conference (SWAC) during the 2024 NCAA Division I FCS football season. The Delta Devils were coached by second-year head coach Kendrick Wade and played at Rice–Totten Stadium in Itta Bena, Mississippi.

== Schedule ==
| Date | Time | Opponent | Site | TV | Result | Attendance |
|---|---|---|---|---|---|---|
| August 31 | 5:00 p.m. | at Tennessee State* | Nissan Stadium; Nashville, TN | ESPN+ | L 21–41 | 8,124 |
| September 7 | 6:00 p.m. | at Lamar* | Provost Umphrey Stadium; Beaumont, TX | ESPN+ | L 14–28 | 5,574 |
| September 14 | 6:00 p.m. | at Murray State* | Roy Stewart Stadium; Murray, KY | ESPN+ | L 8–59 | 9,088 |
| September 21 | 3:00 p.m. | at Nicholls* | Manning Field at John L. Guidry Stadium; Thibodaux, LA | ESPN+ | L 0–66 | 4,828 |
| September 28 | 6:00 p.m. | Alcorn State | Rice–Totten Stadium; Itta Bena, MS | | L 21–42 | 7,834 |
| October 12 | 2:00 p.m. | at Alabama State | ASU Stadium; Montgomery, AL | | L 17–54 | 10,427 |
| October 19 | 2:00 p.m. | Bethune–Cookman^{†} | Rice–Totten Stadium; Itta Bena, MS | | L 10–20 | 9,321 |
| October 26 | 2:00 p.m. | at Arkansas–Pine Bluff | Simmons Bank Field; Pine Bluff, AR | | L 21–35 | 12,437 |
| November 2 | 2:00 p.m. | Prairie View A&M | Rice–Totten Stadium; Itta Bena, MS | | L 16–17 | 1,952 |
| November 9 | 2:00 p.m. | at Jackson State | Mississippi Veterans Memorial Stadium; Jackson, MS | | L 14–51 | 13,954 |
| November 16 | 12:00 p.m. | at Florida A&M | Bragg Memorial Stadium; Tallahassee, FL | | W 24–21 | 12,485 |
| November 23 | 12:00 p.m. | Alabama A&M | Rice–Totten Stadium; Itta Bena, MS | | L 35–49 | 3,759 |
*Non-conference game; ^{†}Homecoming; All times are in Central time

== Game summaries ==
=== at Tennessee State ===
Game One – Mississippi Valley State Delta Devils (0–0) vs Tennessee State Tigers (0–0) – Game summary

| Quarter | 1 | 2 | 3 | 4 | Total |
|---|---|---|---|---|---|
| Delta Devils | 0 | 0 | 0 | 21 | 21 |
| Tigers | 21 | 10 | 0 | 10 | 41 |

at Nissan Stadium • Nashville, TN

- Date: August 31, 2024
- Game time: 5:00 p.m.
- Game weather: Sunny, 87 °F (31 °C)
- Game attendance: 8,124
- Referee: Jeremee Tate
- TV: ESPN+

Game information

First quarter
Second quarter
Third quarter
Fourth quarter

| Statistics | MVSU | TNST |
|---|---|---|
| First downs | 16 | 21 |
| Total yards | 264 | 495 |
| Rushing yards | 69 | 138 |
| Passing yards | 195 | 357 |
| Passing: Comp–Att–Int | 13–23–1 | 22–34–1 |
| Time of possession | 30:10 | 29:50 |

| Team | Category | Player | Statistics |
|---|---|---|---|
| Mississippi Valley State | Passing | Jaydyn Sisk | 7/10, 110 yards, 1 TD |
| Mississippi Valley State | Rushing | Zamariyon Kendall | 12 carries, 26 yards |
| Mississippi Valley State | Receiving | Nathan Rembert | 4 receptions, 81 yards, 1 TD |
| Tennessee State | Passing | Draylen Ellis | 21/33, 356 yards, 3 TD, 1 INT |
| Tennessee State | Rushing | Jaden McGill | 7 carries, 41 yards |
| Tennessee State | Receiving | Jalal Dean | 9 receptions, 144 yards, 1 TD |

=== at Lamar ===
Game Two – Mississippi Valley State Delta Devils (0–1) vs Lamar Cardinals (0–1) – Game summary

| Quarter | 1 | 2 | 3 | 4 | Total |
|---|---|---|---|---|---|
| Delta Devils | 7 | 0 | 7 | 0 | 14 |
| Cardinals | 14 | 7 | 0 | 7 | 28 |

at Provost Umphrey Stadium • Beaumont, TX

- Date: September 7, 2024
- Game time: 6:00 p.m.
- Game weather: Sunny • Temperature: 88 °F (31 °C) • Wind: NE 14 mph
- Game attendance: 5,574
- Referee: Gary Leeper
- TV: ESPN+

Game information

First quarter

- (10:11) LU – Rhea, Sevonne 10 yd pass from Coleman, Robert (Esqueda, Chris kick) 8 plays, 77 yards, Cardinals 0–7. Drive: 8 plays, 77 yards, 2:17.
- (4:52) MVS – Thomas, Remiello 4 yd pass from Williams, Ty'Jarian (Jovisic, Marko kick), Tie 7–7. Drive: 12 plays, 75 yards, 5:19.
- (00:00) LU – Griffin, Khalan 1 yd run (Esqueda, Chris kick), Cardinals 14–7. Drive: 10 plays, 70 yards, 4:46.

Second quarter

- (1:36) LU – Hyder, JaCorey 63 yd pass from Coleman, Robert (Esqueda, Chris kick), Cardinals 0–21. Drive: 1 play, 636 yards, 0:07.

Third quarter

- (06:13) MVS – Ross, Kerrick 20 yd pass from Sisk, Jaydyn (Jovisic, Marko kick), Cardinals 14–21. Drive: 9 plays, 55 yards, 4:46.

Fourth quarter

- (01:04) LU – Griffin, Khalan 1 yd run (Esqueda, Chris kick), Cardinals 14–28. Drive: 9 plays, 84 yards, 5:06.

| Statistics | MVSU | LAM |
|---|---|---|
| First downs | 20 | 24 |
| Total yards | 280 | 438 |
| Rushing yards | 72 | 222 |
| Passing yards | 208 | 216 |
| Passing: Comp–Att–Int | 21–36–2 | 12–30–1 |
| Time of possession | 31:47 | 28:13 |

| Team | Category | Player | Statistics |
|---|---|---|---|
| Mississippi Valley State | Passing | Jayden Sisk | 18/31, 171 yards, TD |
| Mississippi Valley State | Rushing | Ty'Jarian Williams | 10 carries, 45 yards |
| Mississippi Valley State | Receiving | Nathan Rembert | 9 receptions, 95 yards |
| Lamar | Passing | Robert Coleman | 12/30, 216 yards, 2 TD, INT |
| Lamar | Rushing | Khalan Griffin | 23 carries, 197 yards, 2 TD |
| Lamar | Receiving | JaCorey Hyder | 4 receptions, 117 yards, TD |

=== at Murray State ===
Game Three – Mississippi Valley State Delta Devils (0–2) vs Murray State Racers (0–2) – Game summary

| Quarter | 1 | 2 | 3 | 4 | Total |
|---|---|---|---|---|---|
| Delta Devils | 0 | 8 | 0 | 0 | 8 |
| Racers | 21 | 10 | 14 | 14 | 59 |

at Roy Stewart Stadium • Murray, KY

- Date: September 14, 2024
- Game time: 6:00 p.m.
- Game weather: 0 °F (−18 °C)
- TV: ESPN+

Game information

First quarter
Second quarter
Third quarter
Fourth quarter

| Statistics | MVSU | MURR |
|---|---|---|
| First downs | | |
| Total yards | | |
| Rushing yards | | |
| Passing yards | | |
| Passing: Comp–Att–Int | | |
| Time of possession | | |

| Team | Category | Player | Statistics |
|---|---|---|---|
| Mississippi Valley State | Passing | | |
| Mississippi Valley State | Rushing | | |
| Mississippi Valley State | Receiving | | |
| Murray State | Passing | | |
| Murray State | Rushing | | |
| Murray State | Receiving | | |

=== at Nicholls ===
Game Four – Mississippi Valley State Delta Devils (0–3) vs Nicholls Colonels (0–3) – Game summary

| Quarter | 1 | 2 | 3 | 4 | Total |
|---|---|---|---|---|---|
| Delta Devils | 0 | 0 | 0 | 0 | 0 |
| Colonels | 21 | 24 | 14 | 7 | 66 |

at Manning Field at John L. Guidry Stadium • Thibodaux, LA

- Date: September 21, 2024
- Game time: 3:00 p.m.
- Game weather: 0 °F (−18 °C)
- TV: ESPN+

Game information

First quarter
Second quarter
Third quarter
Fourth quarter

| Statistics | MVSU | NICH |
|---|---|---|
| First downs | | |
| Total yards | | |
| Rushing yards | | |
| Passing yards | | |
| Passing: Comp–Att–Int | | |
| Time of possession | | |

| Team | Category | Player | Statistics |
|---|---|---|---|
| Mississippi Valley State | Passing | | |
| Mississippi Valley State | Rushing | | |
| Mississippi Valley State | Receiving | | |
| Nicholls | Passing | | |
| Nicholls | Rushing | | |
| Nicholls | Receiving | | |

=== Alcorn State ===
Game Five – Alcorn State Braves (1–3) at Mississippi Valley State Delta Devils (0–4) – Game summary

| Quarter | 1 | 2 | 3 | 4 | Total |
|---|---|---|---|---|---|
| Braves | 0 | 0 | 0 | 0 | 0 |
| Delta Devils | 0 | 0 | 0 | 0 | 0 |

at Rice–Totten Stadium, Itta Bena, Mississippi

- Date: Saturday September 28, 2024
- Game time: 6:00 p.m.

Game information

First quarter
Second quarter
Third quarter
Fourth quarter

| Statistics | ALCN | MVSU |
|---|---|---|
| First downs | | |
| Total yards | | |
| Rushing yards | | |
| Passing yards | | |
| Turnovers | | |
| Time of possession | | |

| Team | Category | Player | Statistics |
|---|---|---|---|
| Alcorn State | Passing | | |
| Alcorn State | Rushing | | |
| Alcorn State | Receiving | | |
| Mississippi Valley State | Passing | | |
| Mississippi Valley State | Rushing | | |
| Mississippi Valley State | Receiving | | |

=== at Alabama State ===
Game Six – Mississippi Valley State Delta Devils (0–5) vs Alabama State Hornets (2–3) – Game summary

| Quarter | 1 | 2 | 3 | 4 | Total |
|---|---|---|---|---|---|
| Delta Devils | 0 | 0 | 0 | 0 | 0 |
| Hornets | 0 | 0 | 0 | 0 | 0 |

at ASU Stadium, Montgomery, AL

- Date: Saturday October 12, 2024
- Game time: 2:00 PM CST
- TV: ESPN+

Game information

First quarter
Second quarter
Third quarter
Fourth quarter

| Statistics | MVSU | ALST |
|---|---|---|
| First downs | | |
| Total yards | | |
| Rushing yards | | |
| Passing yards | | |
| Passing: Comp–Att–Int | | |
| Time of possession | | |

| Team | Category | Player | Statistics |
|---|---|---|---|
| Mississippi Valley State | Passing | | |
| Mississippi Valley State | Rushing | | |
| Mississippi Valley State | Receiving | | |
| Alabama State | Passing | | |
| Alabama State | Rushing | | |
| Alabama State | Receiving | | |

=== Bethune–Cookman ===
Game Seven – Bethune–Cookman Wildcats (0–6) at Mississippi Valley State Delta Devils (0–6) – Game summary

| Quarter | 1 | 2 | 3 | 4 | Total |
|---|---|---|---|---|---|
| Wildcats | 0 | 0 | 0 | 0 | 0 |
| Delta Devils | 0 | 0 | 0 | 0 | 0 |

at Rice–Totten Stadium • Itta Bena, MS

- Date: Saturday October 19, 2024
- Game time: 2:00 p.m.
- Game weather: 0 °F (−18 °C)

Game information

First quarter
Second quarter
Third quarter
Fourth quarter

| Statistics | BCU | MVSU |
|---|---|---|
| First downs | | |
| Total yards | | |
| Rushing yards | | |
| Passing yards | | |
| Passing: Comp–Att–Int | | |
| Time of possession | | |

| Team | Category | Player | Statistics |
|---|---|---|---|
| Bethune–Cookman | Passing | | |
| Bethune–Cookman | Rushing | | |
| Bethune–Cookman | Receiving | | |
| Mississippi Valley State | Passing | | |
| Mississippi Valley State | Rushing | | |
| Mississippi Valley State | Receiving | | |

=== at Arkansas–Pine Bluff ===
Game Eight – Mississippi Valley State Delta Devils (0–7) vs Arkansas–Pine Bluff Golden Lions (2–5) – Game summary

| Quarter | 1 | 2 | 3 | 4 | Total |
|---|---|---|---|---|---|
| Delta Devils | 0 | 0 | 0 | 0 | 0 |
| Golden Lions | 0 | 0 | 0 | 0 | 0 |

at Simmons Bank Field, Pine Bluff, AR

- Date: Saturday October 26, 2024
- Game time: 2:00 PM CST

Game information

First quarter
Second quarter
Third quarter
Fourth quarter

| Statistics | MVSU | UAPB |
|---|---|---|
| First downs | | |
| Total yards | | |
| Rushing yards | | |
| Passing yards | | |
| Passing: Comp–Att–Int | | |
| Time of possession | | |

| Team | Category | Player | Statistics |
|---|---|---|---|
| Mississippi Valley State | Passing | | |
| Mississippi Valley State | Rushing | | |
| Mississippi Valley State | Receiving | | |
| Arkansas–Pine Bluff | Passing | | |
| Arkansas–Pine Bluff | Rushing | | |
| Arkansas–Pine Bluff | Receiving | | |

=== Prairie View A&M ===
Game Nine – Prairie View A&M Panthers (3–5) at Mississippi Valley State Delta Devils (0–8) – Game summary

| Quarter | 1 | 2 | 3 | 4 | Total |
|---|---|---|---|---|---|
| Panthers | 0 | 0 | 0 | 0 | 0 |
| Delta Devils | 0 | 0 | 0 | 0 | 0 |

at Rice–Totten Stadium • Itta Bena, MS

- Date: Saturday November 2, 2024
- Game time: 2:00 p.m.
- Game weather: 0 °F (−18 °C)

Game information

First quarter
Second quarter
Third quarter
Fourth quarter

| Statistics | PV | MVSU |
|---|---|---|
| First downs | | |
| Total yards | | |
| Rushing yards | | |
| Passing yards | | |
| Passing: Comp–Att–Int | | |
| Time of possession | | |

| Team | Category | Player | Statistics |
|---|---|---|---|
| Prairie View A&M | Passing | | |
| Prairie View A&M | Rushing | | |
| Prairie View A&M | Receiving | | |
| Mississippi Valley State | Passing | | |
| Mississippi Valley State | Rushing | | |
| Mississippi Valley State | Receiving | | |

=== at Jackson State ===
Game Ten – Mississippi Valley State Delta Devils (0–9) vs Jackson State Tigers (7–2) – Game summary

| Quarter | 1 | 2 | 3 | 4 | Total |
|---|---|---|---|---|---|
| Delta Devils | 0 | 0 | 0 | 0 | 0 |
| Tigers | 0 | 0 | 0 | 0 | 0 |

at Mississippi Veterans Memorial Stadium, Jackson, MS

- Date: Saturday November 9, 2024
- Game time: 2:00 p.m.
- TV: ESPN+

Game information

First quarter
Second quarter
Third quarter
Fourth quarter

| Statistics | MVSU | JKST |
|---|---|---|
| First downs | | |
| Total yards | | |
| Rushing yards | | |
| Passing yards | | |
| Passing: Comp–Att–Int | | |
| Time of possession | | |

| Team | Category | Player | Statistics |
|---|---|---|---|
| Mississippi Valley State | Passing | | |
| Mississippi Valley State | Rushing | | |
| Mississippi Valley State | Receiving | | |
| Jackson State | Passing | | |
| Jackson State | Rushing | | |
| Jackson State | Receiving | | |

=== at Florida A&M ===
Game Eleven – Mississippi Valley State Delta Devils (0–10) vs Florida A&M Rattlers (5–4) – Game summary

| Quarter | 1 | 2 | 3 | 4 | Total |
|---|---|---|---|---|---|
| Delta Devils | 0 | 0 | 0 | 0 | 0 |
| Rattlers | 0 | 0 | 0 | 0 | 0 |

at Bragg Memorial Stadium, Tallahassee, FL

- Date: Saturday November 16, 2024
- Game time: 1:00 p.m.

Game information

First quarter
Second quarter
Third quarter
Fourth quarter

| Statistics | MVSU | FAMU |
|---|---|---|
| First downs | | |
| Total yards | | |
| Rushing yards | | |
| Passing yards | | |
| Passing: Comp–Att–Int | | |
| Time of possession | | |

| Team | Category | Player | Statistics |
|---|---|---|---|
| Mississippi Valley State | Passing | | |
| Mississippi Valley State | Rushing | | |
| Mississippi Valley State | Receiving | | |
| Florida A&M | Passing | | |
| Florida A&M | Rushing | | |
| Florida A&M | Receiving | | |

=== Alabama A&M ===
Game Twelve – Alabama A&M Bulldogs (6–5) at Mississippi Valley State Delta Devils (1–10) – Game summary

| Quarter | 1 | 2 | 3 | 4 | Total |
|---|---|---|---|---|---|
| Bulldogs | 0 | 0 | 0 | 0 | 0 |
| Delta Devils | 0 | 0 | 0 | 0 | 0 |

at Rice–Totten Stadium • Itta Bena, MS

- Date: Saturday November 23, 2024
- Game time: 12:00 p.m.
- Game weather: 0 °F (−18 °C)

Game information

First quarter
Second quarter
Third quarter
Fourth quarter

| Statistics | AAMU | MVSU |
|---|---|---|
| First downs | | |
| Total yards | | |
| Rushing yards | | |
| Passing yards | | |
| Passing: Comp–Att–Int | | |
| Time of possession | | |

| Team | Category | Player | Statistics |
|---|---|---|---|
| Alabama A&M | Passing | | |
| Alabama A&M | Rushing | | |
| Alabama A&M | Receiving | | |
| Mississippi Valley State | Passing | | |
| Mississippi Valley State | Rushing | | |
| Mississippi Valley State | Receiving | | |
