= 2024 Alabama A&M Bulldogs football team =

American college football season

2024 Alabama A&M Bulldogs football
- Conference: Southwestern Athletic Conference
- East Division
- Record: 6–6 (4–4 SWAC)
- Head coach: Connell Maynor (7th season)
- Offensive coordinator: Duane Taylor (7th season)
- Defensive coordinator: Thomas Howard (1st season)
- Home stadium: Louis Crews Stadium

2024 Southwestern Athletic Conference football standings
	Conf.			Overall
Team	W		L	W		L
East Division
No. 18 Jackson State xy$	8	–	1	12	–	2
Florida A&M	5	–	3	7	–	5
Alabama State	5	–	3	7	–	5
Alabama A&M	4	–	4	6	–	6
Bethune–Cookman	2	–	6	2	–	10
Mississippi Valley State	1	–	7	1	–	11
West Division
Southern xy	7	–	2	8	–	5
Alcorn State	5	–	3	6	–	6
Texas Southern	4	–	4	5	–	6
Prairie View A&M	3	–	5	5	–	7
Grambling State	2	–	6	5	–	7
Arkansas–Pine Bluff	2	–	6	3	–	9
Championship: Jackson State 41, Southern 13
$ – Conference champion; x – Division champion/co-champions; y – Championship game participant; Rankings from STATS Poll

The 2024 Alabama A&M Bulldogs football team represented Alabama A&M University as a member of the Southwestern Athletic Conference (SWAC) during the 2024 NCAA Division I FCS football season. The Bulldogs were coached by seventh-year head coach Connell Maynor and played at Louis Crews Stadium in Huntsville, Alabama.

On October 26, redshirt freshman linebacker Medrick Burnett Jr. suffered a major head injury in a game against Alabama State. On November 26, the college's athletic department errounesly announced he had died, but retracted their statement a day later after learning he was still alive. The Jefferson County coroner later confirmed his death.

== Schedule ==
Date	Time	Opponent	Site	TV	Result	Attendance
August 31	6:30 p.m.	at Auburn*	Jordan-Hare Stadium; Auburn, AL	SECN+/ESPN+	L 3–73	88,043
September 7	6:00 p.m.	Kentucky State*	Louis Crews Stadium; Huntsville, AL (Louis Crews Classic)		W 49–7	10,917
September 14	6:00 p.m.	Georgetown (KY)*	Louis Crews Stadium; Huntsville, AL		W 24–16	6,385
September 21	6:00 p.m.	at Austin Peay*	Fortera Stadium; Clarksville, TN	ESPN+	L 16–59	7,947
October 5	4:00 p.m.	vs. Jackson State	Ladd–Peebles Stadium; Mobile, AL	ESPN+	L 38–45	14,956
October 12	2:00 p.m.	Bethune–Cookman^{†}	Louis Crews Stadium; Huntsville, AL	HBCU Go	W 56–12	19,727
October 26	2:30 p.m.	vs. Alabama State	Legion Field; Birmingham, AL (Magic City Classic)	ESPNU	L 19–27	69,125
November 2	2:00 p.m.	Southern	Louis Crews Stadium; Huntsville, AL	HBCU Go	L 20–25	8,391
November 9	2:00 p.m.	at Arkansas–Pine Bluff	Simmons Bank Field; Pine Bluff, AR		W 52–24	3,182
November 14	7:00 p.m.	Grambling State	Louis Crews Stadium; Huntsville, AL	ESPNU	W 22–17	3,595
November 23	12:00 p.m.	at Mississippi Valley State	Rice–Totten Stadium; Itta Bena, MS	TheGrio	W 49–35	3,759
November 29 (Note: Alabama A&M's away game against Florida A&M was originally scheduled to be played on September 28, but the game was moved to on November 29, 2024, due to safety concerns related to Hurricane Helene.)	3:00 p.m.	at Florida A&M	Bragg Memorial Stadium; Tallahassee, FL	ESPN+	L 20–28	
*Non-conference game; ^{†}Homecoming; All times are in Central time

== Game summaries ==
=== at Auburn (FBS) ===
Game One – Alabama A&M Bulldogs (0–0) at Auburn Tigers (FBS) (0–0) – Game summary

Quarter	1	2	3	4	Total
Bulldogs	0	3	0	0	3
Tigers (FBS)	28	24	14	7	73

at Jordan–Hare Stadium • Auburn, Alabama

- Date: August 31, 2024
- Game time: 6:32 p.m. CDT
- Game weather: Sunny
- Game attendance: 88,043
- Referee: Ken Williamson
- TV announcers (ESPN+/SEC Network+): Lowell Galindo (play-by-play) and Fozzy Whittaker (analyst)
- Box Score

Game information
First quarter
- AUB – Jarquez Hunter 34-yard run (Towns McGough kick), 14:13. Auburn 7–0. Drive: 4 plays, 70 yards, 0:47.
- AUB – KeAndre Lambert-Smith 67-yard pass from Payton Thorne (Towns McGough kick), 12:47. Auburn 14–0. Drive: 1 play, 67 yards, 0:12.
- AUB – Cam Coleman 44-yard pass from Payton Thorne (Towns McGough kick), 11:39. Auburn 21–0. Drive: 1 play, 44 yards, 0:07.
- AUB – KeAndre Lambert-Smith 4-yard pass from Payton Thorne (Towns McGough kick), 2:00. Auburn 28–0. Drive: 6 plays, 65 yards, 2:18.

Second quarter

- AUB – Towns McGough 32–yard field goal, 13:48. Auburn 31–0. Drive: 4 plays, 7 yards, 0:59.
- AUB – Perry Thompson 70-yard pass from Payton Thorne (Towns McGough kick), 10:10. Auburn 38–0. Drive: 2 plays, 82 yards, 0:34.
- AA&M – Austin McCready 43–yard field goal, 6:00. Auburn 38–3. Drive: 11 plays, 57 yards, 4:03.
- AUB – Payton Thorne 4-yard run (Towns McGough kick), 3:22. Auburn 45–3. Drive: 6 plays, 75 yards, 2:31.
- AUB – Damari Alston 2-yard run (Towns McGough kick), 0:51. Auburn 52–3. Drive: 6 plays, 47 yards, 1:05.

Third quarter

- AUB – Malcolm Simmons blocked punt recovery (Towns McGough kick), 8:25. Auburn 59–3.
- AUB – Malcolm Simmons 57–yard pass from Hank Brown (Towns McGough kick), 1:40. Auburn 66–3. Drive: 5 plays, 80 yards, 1:32.

Fourth quarter

- AUB – Sam Jackson V 37–yard pass from Hank Brown (Towns McGough kick), 9:09. Auburn 73–3. Drive: 3 plays, 42 yards, 0:51.

Statistics	AAMU	AUB
First downs	13	18
Total yards	70–242	46–628
Rushing yards	36–38	18–177
Passing yards	204	451
Passing: Comp–Att–Int	16–34–0	18–28–0
Time of possession	41:33	18:27

Team	Category	Player	Statistics
Alabama A&M	Passing	Cornelious Brown	13/27, 182 yds
Alabama A&M	Rushing	Ryan Morrow	5 rushes, 18 yds
Alabama A&M	Receiving	Duke Miller	6 receptions, 92 yds
Auburn	Passing	Payton Thorne	13/21, 322 yds, 4 TD
Auburn	Rushing	Jarquez Hunter	4 rushes, 53 yds, TD
Auburn	Receiving	Malcolm Simmons	3 receptions, 91 yds, TD

=== Kentucky State (DII) ===
Game Two – Kentucky State Thorobreds (DII) (0–1) at Alabama A&M Bulldogs (0–1) – Game summary

Quarter	1	2	3	4	Total
Thorobreds (DII)	0	0	0	7	7
Bulldogs	14	14	14	7	49

at Louis Crews Stadium • Huntsville, AL

- Date: Saturday September 7, 2024
- Game time: 6:00 p.m.
- Game weather: Sunny
- Game attendance: 10,917
- Referee: Tony Ross
- TV announcers (SWAC Digital): Ted Dixie, Bryan Howard

Game information

First quarter

- (9:38) AAMU – Xavier Lankford 1-yard run, Austin McCready kick (Drive: 12 plays, 59 yards, 4:07; Alabama A&M 7–0)
- (6:36) AAMU – Duke Miller 38-yard pass from Cornelious Brown, Austin McCready kick (Drive: 2 plays, 43 yards, 0:37; Alabama A&M 14–0)

Second quarter

- (14:55) AAMU – Jacolby Hewitt 8-yard pass from Cornelious Brown, Austin McCready kick (Drive: 6 plays, 60 yards, 1:43; Alabama A&M 21–0)
- (2:00) AAMU – Barry White 20-yard pass from Aveon Smith, Austin McCready kick (Drive: 8 plays, 71 yards, 4:12; Alabama A&M 28–0)

Third quarter

- (12:47) AAMU – Ryan Morrow 18-yard pass from Cornelious Brown, Austin McCready kick (Drive: 6 plays, 84 yards, 2:06; Alabama A&M 35–0)
- (8:17) AAMU – Duke Miller 16-yard pass from Cornelious Brown, Austin McCready kick (Drive: 9 plays, 89 yards, 3:20; Alabama A&M 42–0)

Fourth quarter

- (10:04) AAMU – Kolton Nero 4-yard run, Austin McCready kick (Drive: 14 plays, 99 yards, 7:22; Alabama A&M 49–0)
- (7:15) KYST – Jaden Hale 8-yard pass from Jaun Gainious, Landon Grover kick (Drive: 6 plays, 74 yards, 2:49; Alabama A&M 49–7)

Statistics	KYST	AAMU
First downs	15	30
Total yards	189	659
Rushing yards	38	266
Passing yards	151	393
Passing: Comp–Att–Int	19–32–1	29–39–2
Time of possession	26:22	33:38

Team	Category	Player	Statistics
Kentucky State	Passing	Jaun Gainious	16/28, 144 yards, TD, INT
Kentucky State	Rushing	Jaylen Middleton	6 carries, 25 yards
Kentucky State	Receiving	Kale Anderson	6 receptions, 74 yards
Alabama A&M	Passing	Cornelious Brown	19/26, 278 yards, 4 TD, INT
Alabama A&M	Rushing	Donovan Eaglin	13 carries, 102 yards
Alabama A&M	Receiving	Duke Miller	8 receptions, 132 yards, 2 TD

=== Georgetown (KY) (NAIA) ===
Game Three – Georgetown Tigers (NAIA) (0–0) at Alabama A&M Bulldogs (1–1) – Game summary

Quarter	1	2	3	4	Total
Tigers (NAIA)	7	0	6	3	16
Bulldogs	3	7	7	7	24

at Louis Crews Stadium • Huntsville, AL

- Date: Saturday September 14, 2024
- Game time: 6:00 p.m.
- Game weather: Rain • Temperature: 73 °F (23 °C) • Wind: E 7 miles per hour (11 km/h)
- Game attendance: 6,385
- Referee: Eric Bluntson
- TV announcers (SWAC Digital): Ted Dixie, Bryan Howard

Game information

First quarter

- (5:55) AAMU – Austin McCready 27-yard field goal (Drive: 8 plays, 67 yards, 3:59; Alabama A&M 3–0)
- (3:05) GGA – Jamarcus Robinson 31-yard pass from Gehrig Slunaker, Nate Craft kick (Drive: 8 plays, 67 yards, 3:59; Georgetown (KY) 7–3)

Second quarter

- (14:45) AAMU – Donovan Eaglin 11-yard run, Austin McCready kick (Drive: 10 plays, 75 yards, 3:20; Alabama A&M 10–7)

Third quarter

- (8:00) GGA – Nate Craft 39-yard field goal (Drive: 7 plays, 15 yards, 3:11; Tied 10–10)
- (3:26) AAMU – Aveon Smith 31-yard run, Austin McCready kick (Drive: 9 plays, 75 yards, 4:27; Alabama A&M 17–10)
- (0:08) GGA – Nate Craft 33-yard field goal (Drive: 8 plays, 68 yards, 3:12; Alabama A&M 17–13)

Fourth quarter

- (12:45) AAMU – DeQuadrion Welch 19-yard pass from Aveon Smith, Austin McCready kick (Drive: 6 plays, 75 yards, 2:20; Alabama A&M 24–13)
- (0:25) GGA – Nate Craft 36-yard field goal (Drive: 12 plays, 46 yards, 2:15; Alabama A&M 24–16)

Statistics	GGA	AAMU
First downs	18	25
Total yards	322	515
Rushing yards	46	252
Passing yards	276	263
Passing: Comp–Att–Int	19–35–0	19–34–1
Time of possession	29:56	30:04

Team	Category	Player	Statistics
Georgetown (KY)	Passing	Gehrig Slunaker	18.34, 276 yards, TD
Georgetown (KY)	Rushing	Darius Neal	22 carries, 70 yards
Georgetown (KY)	Receiving	Jamarcus Robinson	5 receptions, 85 yards, TD
Alabama A&M	Passing	Cornelious Brown	8/18, 119 yards, INT
Alabama A&M	Rushing	Donovan Eaglin	14 carries, 81 yards, TD
Alabama A&M	Receiving	Duke Miller	2 receptions, 42 yards

=== at Austin Peay ===
Game Four – Alabama A&M Bulldogs (2–1) vs Austin Peay Governors (0–3) – Game summary

Quarter	1	2	3	4	Total
Bulldogs	0	0	0	0	0
Governors	0	0	0	0	0

at Fortera Stadium • Clarksville, TN

- Date: Saturday September 21, 2024
- Game time: 6:00 PM CST
- Game weather: 0 °F (−18 °C)
- TV announcers (ESPN+): Alex Gould, Ethan Schmidt

Game information

First quarter
Second quarter
Third quarter
Fourth quarter

Statistics	AAMU	APSU
First downs		
Total yards		
Rushing yards		
Passing yards		
Passing: Comp–Att–Int		
Time of possession		

Team	Category	Player	Statistics
Alabama A&M	Passing		
Alabama A&M	Rushing		
Alabama A&M	Receiving		
Austin Peay	Passing		
Austin Peay	Rushing		
Austin Peay	Receiving		

=== vs. Jackson State ===
Game Five – Jackson State Tigers (3–2) vs Alabama A&M Bulldogs (2–2) – Game summary

Quarter	1	2	3	4	Total
Tigers	0	0	0	0	0
Bulldogs	0	0	0	0	0

at Ladd–Peebles Stadium, Mobile, AL

- Date: Saturday October 5, 2024
- Game time: 4:00 p.m.
- TV announcers (ESPN+): Butch Alsandor, Jorge Vargas

Game information

First quarter
Second quarter
Third quarter
Fourth quarter

Statistics	JKST	AAMU
First downs		
Total yards		
Rushing yards		
Passing yards		
Passing: Comp–Att–Int		
Time of possession		

Team	Category	Player	Statistics
Jackson State	Passing		
Jackson State	Rushing		
Jackson State	Receiving		
Alabama A&M	Passing		
Alabama A&M	Rushing		
Alabama A&M	Receiving		

=== Bethune–Cookman ===
Game Six – Bethune–Cookman Wildcats (0–5) at Alabama A&M Bulldogs (2–3) – Game summary

Quarter	1	2	3	4	Total
Wildcats	0	0	0	0	0
Bulldogs	0	0	0	0	0

at Louis Crews Stadium • Huntsville, AL

- Date: Saturday October 12, 2024
- Game time: 2:00 p.m.
- Game weather: 0 °F (−18 °C)
- TV announcers (HBCU GO): Charlie Neal, Jon Kelley, Lawrencia Moten

Game information

First quarter
Second quarter
Third quarter
Fourth quarter

Statistics	BCU	AAMU
First downs		
Total yards		
Rushing yards		
Passing yards		
Passing: Comp–Att–Int		
Time of possession		

Team	Category	Player	Statistics
Bethune–Cookman	Passing		
Bethune–Cookman	Rushing		
Bethune–Cookman	Receiving		
Alabama A&M	Passing		
Alabama A&M	Rushing		
Alabama A&M	Receiving		

=== vs. Alabama State (Magic City Classic) ===
Game Seven – Alabama State Hornets (3–3) vs Alabama A&M Bulldogs (3–3) – Game summary

Quarter	1	2	3	4	Total
Hornets	0	0	0	0	0
Bulldogs	0	0	0	0	0

at Legion Field, Birmingham, Alabama

- Date: Saturday October 26, 2024
- Game time: 2:30 PM
- TV announcers (ESPNU): Tiffany Greene (play-by-play) and Jay Walker (analyst)

Game information

First quarter
Second quarter
Third quarter
Fourth quarter

Statistics	ALST	AAMU
First downs		
Total yards		
Rushing yards		
Passing yards		
Passing: Comp–Att–Int		
Time of possession		

Team	Category	Player	Statistics
Alabama State	Passing		
Alabama State	Rushing		
Alabama State	Receiving		
Alabama A&M	Passing		
Alabama A&M	Rushing		
Alabama A&M	Receiving		

=== Southern ===
Game Eight – Southern Jaguars (4–4) vs Alabama A&M Bulldogs (3–4) – Game summary

Quarter	1	2	3	4	Total
Jaguars	0	0	0	0	0
Bulldogs	0	0	0	0	0

at Louis Crews Stadium, Huntsville, AL

- Date: Saturday November 2, 2024
- Game time: 2:00 p.m.
- TV announcers (HBCU GO): Charlie Neal, Jon Kelley, Lawrencia Moten

Game information

First quarter
Second quarter
Third quarter
Fourth quarter

Statistics	SOU	AAMU
First downs		
Total yards		
Rushing yards		
Passing yards		
Passing: Comp–Att–Int		
Time of possession		

Team	Category	Player	Statistics
Southern	Passing		
Southern	Rushing		
Southern	Receiving		
Alabama A&M	Passing		
Alabama A&M	Rushing		
Alabama A&M	Receiving		

=== at Arkansas–Pine Bluff ===
Game Nine – Alabama A&M Bulldogs (3–5) vs Arkansas–Pine Bluff Golden Lions (3–6) – Game summary

Quarter	1	2	3	4	Total
Bulldogs	0	0	0	0	0
Golden Lions	0	0	0	0	0

at Simmons Bank Field, Pine Bluff, AR

- Date: Saturday November 9, 2024
- Game time: 2:00 PM CST
- TV announcers (ESPN+): LaRon Marbley, BC Davis

Game information

First quarter
Second quarter
Third quarter
Fourth quarter

Statistics	AAMU	UAPB
First downs		
Total yards		
Rushing yards		
Passing yards		
Passing: Comp–Att–Int		
Time of possession		

Team	Category	Player	Statistics
Alabama A&M	Passing		
Alabama A&M	Rushing		
Alabama A&M	Receiving		
Arkansas–Pine Bluff	Passing		
Arkansas–Pine Bluff	Rushing		
Arkansas–Pine Bluff	Receiving		

=== Grambling State ===
Game Ten – Grambling State Tigers (5–5) at Alabama A&M Bulldogs (4–5) – Game summary

Quarter	1	2	3	4	Total
Tigers	3	14	0	0	17
Bulldogs	3	3	13	3	22

at Louis Crews Stadium • Huntsville, AL

- Date: Thursday November 14, 2024
- Game time: 7:00 p.m.
- Game weather: Cloudy • Temperature: 55 °F (13 °C) • Wind: NW 6 miles per hour (9.7 km/h)
- Game attendance: 3,595
- Referee: Y. N. Myers III
- TV announcers (ESPNU): Tiffany Greene (play-by-play) and Jay Walker (analyst)

Game information

First quarter

- (8:31) GSU – Reed Harradine 23-yard field goal (Drive: 6 plays, 77 yards, 2:17; Grambling State 3–0)
- (2:12) AAM – Victor Barbosa 45-yard field goal (Drive: 13 plays, 47 yards, 6:19; Tied 3–3)

Second quarter

- (12:06) GSU – Andrew Jones 30-yard fumble recovery, Reed Harradine kick (Grambling State 10–3)
- (7:24) GSU – JR Waters 10-yard pass from Myles Crawley, Reed Harradine kick (Drive: 5 plays, 60 yards, 2:45; Grambling State 17–3)
- (0:00) AAM – Victor Barbosa 38-yard field goal (Drive: 7 plays, 74 yards, 0:56; Grambling State 17–6)

Third quarter

- (13:46) AAM – Keenan Hambrick 34-yard pass from Cornelious Brown, Cornelious Brown rush (Drive: 1 play, 34 yards, 0:03; Grambling State 17–14)
- (7:04) AAM – Victor Barbosa 44-yard field goal (Drive: 11 plays, 47 yards, 4:07; Tied 17–17)
- (0:46) AAM – 0-yard safety (Alabama A&M 19–17)

Fourth quarter

- (7:20) AAM – Victor Barbosa 19-yard field goal (Drive: 14 plays, 80 yards, 8:18; Alabama A&M 22–17)

Statistics	GRAM	AAMU
First downs	12	27
Total yards	263	388
Rushing yards	94	160
Passing yards	169	228
Passing: Comp–Att–Int	12–29–2	20–35–0
Time of possession	23:21	36:39

Team	Category	Player	Statistics
Grambling State	Passing	Myles Crawley	12/27, 169 yards, TD, 2 INT
Grambling State	Rushing	Ke'Travion Hargrove	8 carries, 38 yards
Grambling State	Receiving	Jalen Johnson	1 reception, 67 yards
Alabama A&M	Passing	Cornelious Brown	20/35, 228 yards, TD
Alabama A&M	Rushing	Donovan Eaglin	25 carries, 123 yards
Alabama A&M	Receiving	Keenan Hambrick	8 receptions, 99 yards, TD

=== at Mississippi Valley State ===
Game Eleven – Alabama A&M Bulldogs (6–5) at Mississippi Valley State Delta Devils (1–10) – Game summary

Quarter	1	2	3	4	Total
Bulldogs	0	0	0	0	0
Delta Devils	0	0	0	0	0

at Rice–Totten Stadium • Itta Bena, MS

- Date: Saturday November 23, 2024
- Game time: 12:00 p.m.
- Game weather: 0 °F (−18 °C)
- TV announcers (TheGrio): James Hadnot, Antoine Bethea, Nia Symone

Game information

First quarter
Second quarter
Third quarter
Fourth quarter

Statistics	AAMU	MVSU
First downs		
Total yards		
Rushing yards		
Passing yards		
Passing: Comp–Att–Int		
Time of possession		

Team	Category	Player	Statistics
Alabama A&M	Passing		
Alabama A&M	Rushing		
Alabama A&M	Receiving		
Mississippi Valley State	Passing		
Mississippi Valley State	Rushing		
Mississippi Valley State	Receiving		

=== at Florida A&M ===
Game Twelve – Alabama A&M Bulldogs (6–5) at Florida A&M Rattlers (6–5) – Game summary

Quarter	1	2	3	4	Total
Bulldogs	0	0	0	0	0
Rattlers	0	0	0	0	0

at Bragg Memorial Stadium • Tallahassee, FL

- Date: Saturday November 29, 2024
- Game time: 3:00 p.m.
- Game weather: 0 °F (−18 °C)
- TV announcers (ESPN+): James Hadnot, Ken Moore

Game information

First quarter
Second quarter
Third quarter
Fourth quarter

Statistics	AAMU	FAMU
First downs		
Total yards		
Rushing yards		
Passing yards		
Passing: Comp–Att–Int		
Time of possession		

Team	Category	Player	Statistics
Alabama A&M	Passing		
Alabama A&M	Rushing		
Alabama A&M	Receiving		
Florida A&M	Passing		
Florida A&M	Rushing		
Florida A&M	Receiving		
