= 2024 Florida A&M Rattlers football team =

American college football season

2024 Florida A&M Rattlers football
- Conference: Southwestern Athletic Conference
- East Division
- Record: 7–5 (5–3 SWAC)
- Head coach: James Colzie III (1st season)
- Offensive coordinator: Joseph Henry (3rd season)
- Offensive scheme: Spread
- Defensive coordinator: Milton Patterson (1st season)
- Base defense: 4–3
- Home stadium: Bragg Memorial Stadium

2024 Southwestern Athletic Conference football standings
	Conf.			Overall
Team	W		L	W		L
East Division
No. 18 Jackson State xy$	8	–	1	12	–	2
Florida A&M	5	–	3	7	–	5
Alabama State	5	–	3	7	–	5
Alabama A&M	4	–	4	6	–	6
Bethune–Cookman	2	–	6	2	–	10
Mississippi Valley State	1	–	7	1	–	11
West Division
Southern xy	7	–	2	8	–	5
Alcorn State	5	–	3	6	–	6
Texas Southern	4	–	4	5	–	6
Prairie View A&M	3	–	5	5	–	7
Grambling State	2	–	6	5	–	7
Arkansas–Pine Bluff	2	–	6	3	–	9
Championship: Jackson State 41, Southern 13
$ – Conference champion; x – Division champion/co-champions; y – Championship game participant; Rankings from STATS Poll

The 2024 Florida A&M Rattlers football team represented Florida A&M University as a member of the Southwestern Athletic Conference (SWAC) during the 2024 NCAA Division I FCS football season. The Rattlers were coached by first-year head coach James Colzie III and played at Bragg Memorial Stadium in Tallahassee, Florida.

== Schedule ==
Date	Time	Opponent	Rank	Site	TV	Result	Attendance
August 24	7:30 p.m.	vs. Norfolk State*		Center Parc Stadium; Atlanta, GA (MEAC/SWAC Challenge)	ABC	W 24–23	22,210
August 31	6:00 p.m.	South Carolina State*		Bragg Memorial Stadium; Tallahassee, FL	ESPN+	W 22–18	15,930
September 7	6:00 p.m.	at No. 12 (FBS) Miami (FL)*		Hard Rock Stadium; Miami Gardens, FL	ACCNX/ESPN+	L 9–56	57,886
September 21	7:00 p.m.	at Troy*		Veterans Memorial Stadium; Troy, AL	ESPN+	L 12–34	29,024
October 5	3:00 p.m.	at Alabama State		ASU Stadium; Montgomery, AL	ESPN+	W 28–13	33,576
October 19	3:30 p.m.	at Jackson State	No. 25т	Mississippi Veterans Memorial Stadium; Jackson, MS	ESPNU	L 21–35	28,450
October 26	7:00 p.m.	Southern		Bragg Memorial Stadium; Tallahassee, FL	ESPN+	W 24–6	
November 2	4:00 p.m.	Texas Southern^{†}		Bragg Memorial Stadium; Tallahassee, FL	ESPN+	W 52–28	23,271
November 9	3:00 p.m.	at Prairie View A&M		Panther Stadium; Prairie View, TX	ESPN+	L 12–31	3,091
November 16	1:00 p.m.	Mississippi Valley State		Bragg Memorial Stadium; Tallahassee, FL	theGrio	L 21–24	12,485
November 23	3:30 p.m.	vs. Bethune–Cookman		Camping World Stadium; Orlando, FL (Florida Classic)	ESPN+	W 41–38	56,453
November 29 (Note: Florida A&M's game against Alabama A&M was originally scheduled to be played on September 28, but the game was moved to on November 29, 2024, due to safety concerns related to Hurricane Helene.)	4:00 p.m.	Alabama A&M		Bragg Memorial Stadium; Tallahassee, FL	ESPN+	W 28–20	10,887
*Non-conference game; ^{†}Homecoming; Rankings from STATS Poll released prior to the game; All times are in Eastern time

== Game summaries ==
=== vs. Norfolk State ===
Game One – Florida A&M Rattlers (0-0) vs Norfolk State Spartans (0-0) – Game summary

Quarter	1	2	3	4	Total
Rattlers	7	3	14	0	24
Spartans	14	0	3	6	23

at Center Parc Stadium, Atlanta, Georgia

- Date: Saturday August 24, 2024
- Game time: 7:30 PM
- Game attendance: 22,210
- Referee: Derek Hatten
- TV announcers (ABC): Tiffany Greene (play-by-play), Jay Walker (analyst), and Quint Kessenich (sideline)

Game information

First quarter

- (13:18) NORF – Kevon King 82-yard run (Grandin Wilcox kick) (Drive: 3 plays, 92 yards, 1:37; Norfolk State 7-0)
- (3:49) NORF – Jalen Daniels 1-yard run (Grandin Wilcox kick) (Drive: 12 plays, 73 yards, 6:47; Norfolk State 14-0)
- (0:55) FAMU – Thad Franklin Jr. 20-yard pass from Daniel Richardson (Cameron Gillis kick) (Drive: 7 plays, 75 yards, 2:54; Norfolk State 14-7)

Second quarter

- (11:02) FAMU – Cameron Gillis 33-yard field goal (Drive: 5 plays, 31 yards, 2:23; Norfolk State 14-10)

Third quarter

- (12:37) FAMU – Jamari Gassett 55-yard pass from Daniel Richardson (Cameron Gillis kick) (Drive: 5 plays, 82 yards, 2:19; Florida A&M 17-14)
- (9:04) NORF – Grandin Wilcox 29-yard field goal (Drive: 6 plays, 63 yards, 3:33; Tied 17-17)
- (3:27) FAMU – Jamari Gassett 9-yard pass from Daniel Richardson (Cameron Gillis kick) (Drive: 10 plays, 75 yards, 5:17; Florida A&M 24-17)

Fourth quarter

- (6:29) NORF – Kevon King 2-yard run (run failed) (Drive: 9 plays, 73 yards, 5:02; Florida A&M 24-23)

Statistics	FAMU	NORF
First downs	22	15
Total yards	54–406	51–371
Rushing yards	24–120	42–229
Passing yards	286	142
Passing: Comp–Att–Int	22–30–0	7–9–0
Time of possession	28:56	31:04

Team	Category	Player	Statistics
Florida A&M	Passing	Daniel Richardson	22/30, 286 yards, 3 TD
Florida A&M	Rushing	Kelvin Dean	11 carries, 49 yards
Florida A&M	Receiving	Jamari Gassett	8 receptions, 110 yards, 2 TD
Norfolk State	Passing	Jalen Daniels	7/9, 142 yards
Norfolk State	Rushing	Kevon King	14 carries, 146 yards, 2 TD
Norfolk State	Receiving	Jacquez Jones	4 receptions, 78 yards

=== South Carolina State ===
Game Two – South Carolina State Bulldogs (0–0) vs Florida A&M Rattlers (1–0) – Game summary

Quarter	1	2	3	4	Total
Bulldogs	3	3	6	6	18
Rattlers	0	7	0	15	22

at Bragg Memorial Stadium • Tallahassee, Florida

- Date: August 31, 2024
- Game time: 6:00 p.m.
- Game weather: Sunny, 93 °F (34 °C)
- Game attendance: 15,930
- Referee: Y.N. Myers III
- TV announcers (ESPN+): Noah Reed (play-by-play) and Byron Chamberlain (analyst)

Game information

First quarter

- (0:49) SCST – Kyle Gallegos 35-yard field goal (Drive: 12 plays, 73 yards, 7:17; South Carolina State 3–0)

Second quarter

- (10:52) FAMU – Koby Gross 29-yard pass from Daniel Richardson, Cameron Gillis kick (Drive: 11 plays, 80 yards, 4:53; Florida A&M 7–3)
- (0:00) SCST – Kyle Gallegos 37-yard field goal (Drive: 9 plays, 61 yards, 1:48; Florida A&M 7–6)

Third quarter

- (1:08) SCST – KZ Adams 8-yard pass from Eric Phoenix (Drive: 12 plays, 80 yards, 5:15; South Carolina State 12–7)

Fourth quarter

- (12:14) SCST – Josh Shaw 1-yard run (Drive: 7 plays, 48 yards, 3:01; South Carolina State 18–7)
- (10:32) FAMU – Karter Johnson 7-yard pass from Daniel Richardson, Koby Gross pass (Drive: 4 plays, 74 yards, 1:34; South Carolina State 18–15)
- (5:39) FAMU – Thad Franklin Jr. 6-yard pass from Daniel Richardson, Cameron Gillis kick (Drive: 9 plays, 84 yards, 3:33; Florida A&M 22–18)

Statistics	SCST	FAMU
First downs	19	26
Total yards	286	415
Rushing yards	154	133
Passing yards	132	282
Passing: Comp–Att–Int	12–26–0	23–38–0
Time of possession	27:21	31:31

Team	Category	Player	Statistics
South Carolina State	Passing	Eric Phoenix	12/25, 132 yards, TD
South Carolina State	Rushing	Deondra Duehart	10 carries, 74 yards
South Carolina State	Receiving	Caden High	3 receptions, 49 yards
Florida A&M	Passing	Daniel Richardson	23/38, 282 yards, 3 TD
Florida A&M	Rushing	Levontai Summersett	11 carries, 62 yards
Florida A&M	Receiving	Koby Gross	6 receptions, 106 yards, TD

=== at No. 12 (FBS) Miami (FL) ===
Game Three – Florida A&M Rattlers (2–0) vs No. 12 (FBS) Miami Hurricanes (1–0) – Game summary

Quarter	1	2	3	4	Total
Rattlers	3	3	3	0	9
No. 12 (FBS) Hurricanes	15	10	21	10	56

at Hard Rock Stadium • Miami Gardens, FL

- Date: September 7, 2024
- Game time: 6:00 p.m.
- Game weather: Sunny • Temperature: 90 °F (32 °C) • Wind: NW 11 mph
- Game attendance: 57,886
- Referee: Jon Noli
- TV announcers (ACCNX/ESPN+): Chuckie Kempf (play-by-play), Forrest Conoly (analyst), and Marilyn Payne (sideline reporter)

Game information

First quarter

- (13:40) MIA – Elijah Arroyo 17-yard pass from Cam Ward, Andres Borregales kick (Drive: 2 plays, 28 yards, 0:33; Miami 7–0)
- (6:40) MIA – Xavier Restrepo 50-yard pass from Cam Ward, Riley Willimas two–point run (Drive: 7 plays, 99 yards, 3:30; Miami 15–0)
- (0:49) FAMU – Cameron Gillis 22-yard field goal (Drive: 9 plays, 70 yards, 5:51; Miami 15–3)

Second quarter

- (12:58) MIA – Chris Johnson Jr. 9-yard pass from Cam Ward, Andres Borregales kick (Drive: 7 plays, 75 yards, 2:51; Miami 22–3)
- (5:43) MIA – Andres Borregales 37-yard field goal (Drive: 9 plays, 44 yards, 4:51; Miami 25–3)
- (0:00) FAMU – Cameron Gillis 36-yard field goal (Drive: 10 plays, 67 yards, 2:09; Miami 25–6)

Third quarter

- (12:33) MIA – Mark Fletcher Jr. 4-yard run, Andres Borregales kick (Drive: 7 plays, 75 yards, 2:27; Miami 32–6)
- (9:14) MIA – Damien Martinez 33-yard run, Andres Borregales kick (Drive: 3 plays, 73 yards, 1:11; Miami 39–6)
- (7:29) FAMU – Michael Smith 49-yard field goal (Drive: 5 plays, 43 yards, 1:45; Miami 39–9)
- (3:43) MIA – Cam Ward 8-yard run, Andres Borregales kick (Drive: 8 plays, 60 yards, 3:34; Miami 46–9)

Fourth quarter

- (14:23) MIA – Jordan Lyle 1-yard run, Andres Borregales kick (Drive: 6 plays, 43 yards, 3:11; Miami 53–9)
- (2:00) MIA – Abram Murray 38-yard field goal (Drive: 14 plays, 58 yards, 8:05; Miami 56–9)

Statistics	FAMU	MIA
First downs	13	31
Total yards	194	548
Rushing yards	52	224
Passing yards	142	324
Passing: Comp–Att–Int	15–28–3	26–33–0
Time of possession	25:18	34:42

Team	Category	Player	Statistics
Florida A&M	Passing	Daniel Richardson	13/17, 135 yards, INT
Florida A&M	Rushing	Dorian Collier	5 carries, 31 yards
Florida A&M	Receiving	Jamari Gassett	5 receptions, 61 yards
Miami (FL)	Passing	Cameron Ward	20/26, 304 yards, 3 TD
Miami (FL)	Rushing	Damien Martinez	10 carries, 90 yards, TD
Miami (FL)	Receiving	Xavier Restrepo	4 receptions, 104 yards, TD

=== at Troy (FBS) ===
Game Four – Florida A&M Rattlers (2–1) vs Troy Trojans (FBS) (0–3) – Game summary

Quarter	1	2	3	4	Total
Rattlers	6	3	3	0	12
Trojans (FBS)	7	7	7	13	34

at Veterans Memorial Stadium • Troy, AL

- Date: September 21, 2024
- Game time: 7:00 p.m.
- Game weather: Sunny • Temperature: 85 °F (29 °C) • Wind: W 3 mph
- Game attendance: 29,024
- Referee: Tim Barker
- TV announcers (ESPN+): Will Kollmeyer (play-by-play), Ben Stanfield (analyst), and Junior Louissaint (sideline)

Game information

First quarter

- (12:22) TROY – Damien Taylor 40-yard run, Scott Taylor Renfroe kick (Drive: 6 plays, 75 yards, 2:38; Troy 7–0)
- (7:34) FAMU – Cameron Gillis 29-yard field goal (Drive: 10 plays, 53 yards, 4:48; Troy 7–3)
- (1:11) FAMU – Cameron Gillis 22-yard field goal (Drive: 8 plays, 63 yards, 4:03; Troy 7–6)

Second quarter

- (0:46) TROY – Devonte Ross 20-yard pass from Goose Crowder, Scott Taylor Renfroe kick (Drive: 2 plays, 40 yards, 0:20; Troy 14–6)
- (0:05) FAMU – Cameron Gillis 31-yard field goal (Drive: 5 plays, 61 yards, 0:41; Troy 14–9)

Third quarter

- (10:57) TROY – Devonte Ross 44-yard from Goose Crowder, Scott Taylor Renfroe kick (Drive: 4 plays, 73 yards, 1:58; Troy 21–9)
- (5:29) FAMU – Cameron Gillis 43-yard field goal (Drive: 10 plays, 57 yards, 5:23; Troy 21–12)

Fourth quarter

- (14:16) TROY – Damien Taylor 7-yard pass from Goose Crowder (Drive: 12 plays, 75 yards, 6:12; Troy 27–12)
- (8:36) TROY – Devonte Ross 98-yard pass from Goose Crowder, Scott Taylor Renfroe kick (Drive: 3 plays, 98 yards, 0:51; Troy 34–12)

Statistics	FAMU	TROY
First downs	19	24
Total yards	343	507
Rushing yards	55	212
Passing yards	288	295
Passing: Comp–Att–Int	25–39–0	18–25–0
Time of possession	33:05	26:55

Team	Category	Player	Statistics
Florida A&M	Passing	Daniel Richardson	25/39, 288 yards
Florida A&M	Rushing	Thad Franklin Jr.	10 carries, 46 yards
Florida A&M	Receiving	Jamari Gassett	10 receptions, 141 yards
Troy	Passing	Goose Crowder	17/24, 291 yards, 4 TD
Troy	Rushing	Damien Taylor	15 carries, 109 yards, TD
Troy	Receiving	Devonte Ross	11 receptions, 229 yards, 3 TD

=== at Alabama State ===
Game Five – Florida A&M Rattlers (2–2) vs Alabama State Hornets (2–2) – Game summary

Quarter	1	2	3	4	Total
Rattlers	0	0	0	0	0
Hornets	0	0	0	0	0

at ASU Stadium, Montgomery, AL

- Date: Saturday October 5, 2024
- Game time: 3:00 p.m.
- TV announcers (ESPN+): Charlie Neal, Jon Kelley, Lawrencia Moten

Game information

First quarter
Second quarter
Third quarter
Fourth quarter

Statistics	FAMU	ALST
First downs		
Total yards		
Rushing yards		
Passing yards		
Passing: Comp–Att–Int		
Time of possession		

Team	Category	Player	Statistics
Florida A&M	Passing		
Florida A&M	Rushing		
Florida A&M	Receiving		
Alabama State	Passing		
Alabama State	Rushing		
Alabama State	Receiving		

=== at Jackson State ===
Game Six – No. 25т Florida A&M Rattlers (3–2) vs Jackson State Tigers (4–2) – Game summary

Quarter	1	2	3	4	Total
No. 25т Rattlers	0	0	0	0	0
Tigers	0	0	0	0	0

at Mississippi Veterans Memorial Stadium, Jackson, MS

- Date: Saturday October 19, 2024
- Game time: 3:30 p.m.
- TV announcers (ESPNU): Tiffany Greene (play-by-play) and Jay Walker (analyst)

Game information

First quarter
Second quarter
Third quarter
Fourth quarter

Statistics	FAMU	JKST
First downs		
Total yards		
Rushing yards		
Passing yards		
Passing: Comp–Att–Int		
Time of possession		

Team	Category	Player	Statistics
Florida A&M	Passing		
Florida A&M	Rushing		
Florida A&M	Receiving		
Jackson State	Passing		
Jackson State	Rushing		
Jackson State	Receiving		

=== Southern ===
Game Seven – Southern Jaguars (4–3) vs Florida A&M Rattlers (3–3) – Game summary

Quarter	1	2	3	4	Total
Jaguars	0	0	0	0	0
Rattlers	0	0	0	0	0

at Bragg Memorial Stadium, Tallahassee, FL

- Date: Saturday October 26, 2024
- Game time: 7:00 p.m.
- TV announcers (ESPN+): Mo Carter, Tolly Carr

Game information

First quarter
Second quarter
Third quarter
Fourth quarter

Statistics	SOU	FAMU
First downs		
Total yards		
Rushing yards		
Passing yards		
Passing: Comp–Att–Int		
Time of possession		

Team	Category	Player	Statistics
Southern	Passing		
Southern	Rushing		
Southern	Receiving		
Florida A&M	Passing		
Florida A&M	Rushing		
Florida A&M	Receiving		

=== Texas Southern ===
Game Eight – Texas Southern Tigers (3–4) vs Florida A&M Rattlers (4–3) – Game summary

Quarter	1	2	3	4	Total
Tigers	0	0	0	0	0
Rattlers	0	0	0	0	0

at Bragg Memorial Stadium, Tallahassee, FL

- Date: Saturday November 2, 2024
- Game time: 4:00 p.m.
- TV announcers (ESPN+): James Hadnot, Tolly Carr

Game information

First quarter
Second quarter
Third quarter
Fourth quarter

Statistics	TXSO	FAMU
First downs		
Total yards		
Rushing yards		
Passing yards		
Passing: Comp–Att–Int		
Time of possession		

Team	Category	Player	Statistics
Texas Southern	Passing		
Texas Southern	Rushing		
Texas Southern	Receiving		
Florida A&M	Passing		
Florida A&M	Rushing		
Florida A&M	Receiving		

=== at Prairie View A&M ===
Game Nine – Florida A&M Rattlers (5–3) vs Prairie View A&M Panthers (4–5) – Game summary

Quarter	1	2	3	4	Total
Rattlers	0	0	0	0	0
Panthers	0	0	0	0	0

at Panther Stadium, Prairie View, TX

- Date: Saturday November 9, 2024
- Game time: 3:00 p.m.
- TV: ESPN+

Game information

First quarter
Second quarter
Third quarter
Fourth quarter

Statistics	FAMU	PV
First downs		
Total yards		
Rushing yards		
Passing yards		
Passing: Comp–Att–Int		
Time of possession		

Team	Category	Player	Statistics
Florida A&M	Passing		
Florida A&M	Rushing		
Florida A&M	Receiving		
Prairie View A&M	Passing		
Prairie View A&M	Rushing		
Prairie View A&M	Receiving		

=== Mississippi Valley State ===
Game Ten – Mississippi Valley State Delta Devils (0–10) vs Florida A&M Rattlers (5–4) – Game summary

Quarter	1	2	3	4	Total
Delta Devils	0	0	0	0	0
Rattlers	0	0	0	0	0

at Bragg Memorial Stadium, Tallahassee, FL

- Date: Saturday November 16, 2024
- Game time: 1:00 p.m.
- TV announcers (TheGrio): James Hadnot, Antoine Bethea, Nia Symone

Game information

First quarter
Second quarter
Third quarter
Fourth quarter

Statistics	MVSU	FAMU
First downs		
Total yards		
Rushing yards		
Passing yards		
Passing: Comp–Att–Int		
Time of possession		

Team	Category	Player	Statistics
Mississippi Valley State	Passing		
Mississippi Valley State	Rushing		
Mississippi Valley State	Receiving		
Florida A&M	Passing		
Florida A&M	Rushing		
Florida A&M	Receiving		

=== vs. Bethune–Cookman (Florida Classic) ===
Game Eleven – Florida A&M Rattlers (5–5) vs. Bethune–Cookman Wildcats (2–9) – Game summary

Quarter	1	2	3	4	Total
Rattlers	0	0	0	0	0
Wildcats	0	0	0	0	0

at Camping World Stadium • Orlando, FL

- Date: November 23, 2024
- Game time: 3:30 p.m.
- Game weather: 0 °F (−18 °C)
- TV announcers (ESPN+/ESPNU): Tiffany Greene (play-by-play) and Jay Walker (analyst)

Game information

First quarter
Second quarter
Third quarter
Fourth quarter

Statistics	FAMU	BCU
First downs		
Total yards		
Rushing yards		
Passing yards		
Passing: Comp–Att–Int		
Time of possession		

Team	Category	Player	Statistics
Florida A&M	Passing		
Florida A&M	Rushing		
Florida A&M	Receiving		
Bethune–Cookman	Passing		
Bethune–Cookman	Rushing		
Bethune–Cookman	Receiving		

=== Alabama A&M ===
Game Twelve – Alabama A&M Bulldogs (6–5) at Florida A&M Rattlers (6–5) – Game summary

Quarter	1	2	3	4	Total
Bulldogs	0	0	0	0	0
Rattlers	0	0	0	0	0

at Bragg Memorial Stadium • Tallahassee, FL

- Date: Saturday November 29, 2024
- Game time: 4:00 p.m.
- Game weather: 0 °F (−18 °C)
- TV: ESPN+

Game information

First quarter
Second quarter
Third quarter
Fourth quarter

Statistics	AAMU	FAMU
First downs		
Total yards		
Rushing yards		
Passing yards		
Passing: Comp–Att–Int		
Time of possession		

Team	Category	Player	Statistics
Alabama A&M	Passing		
Alabama A&M	Rushing		
Alabama A&M	Receiving		
Florida A&M	Passing		
Florida A&M	Rushing		
Florida A&M	Receiving		
