= 2024 Jackson State Tigers football team =

American college football season

2024 Jackson State Tigers football

Black college national champion Celebration Bowl champion SWAC champion SWAC East Division champion

SWAC Championship Game, W 41–13 vs. Southern

Celebration Bowl, W 28–7 vs. South Carolina State
- Conference: Southwestern Athletic Conference
- East Division

Ranking
- STATS: No. 18
- FCS Coaches: No. 15
- Record: 12–2 (7–1 SWAC)
- Head coach: T. C. Taylor (2nd season)
- Offensive scheme: Multiple
- Defensive coordinator: Torenzo Quinn (1st season)
- Base defense: 4–2–5
- Home stadium: Mississippi Veterans Memorial Stadium

2024 Southwestern Athletic Conference football standings
	Conf.			Overall
Team	W		L	W		L
East Division
No. 18 Jackson State xy$	8	–	1	12	–	2
Florida A&M	5	–	3	7	–	5
Alabama State	5	–	3	7	–	5
Alabama A&M	4	–	4	6	–	6
Bethune–Cookman	2	–	6	2	–	10
Mississippi Valley State	1	–	7	1	–	11
West Division
Southern xy	7	–	2	8	–	5
Alcorn State	5	–	3	6	–	6
Texas Southern	4	–	4	5	–	6
Prairie View A&M	3	–	5	5	–	7
Grambling State	2	–	6	5	–	7
Arkansas–Pine Bluff	2	–	6	3	–	9
Championship: Jackson State 41, Southern 13
$ – Conference champion; x – Division champion/co-champions; y – Championship game participant; Rankings from STATS Poll

The 2024 Jackson State Tigers football team represented Jackson State University as a member of the Southwestern Athletic Conference (SWAC) during the 2024 NCAA Division I FCS football season. The Tigers were coached by second-year head coach T. C. Taylor and played at Mississippi Veterans Memorial Stadium in Jackson, Mississippi.

== Schedule ==
Date	Time	Opponent	Rank	Site	TV	Result	Attendance
August 29	6:00 p.m.	at Louisiana–Monroe*		Malone Stadium; Monroe, LA	ESPN+	L 14–30	11,145
September 7	6:00 p.m.	Lane*		Mississippi Veterans Memorial Stadium; Jackson, MS (W.C. Gorden Classic)	SWAC DN	W 58–7	26,700
September 14	6:00 p.m.	Southern (Note: The games against Grambling State and Southern, fellow members of the SWAC, were played as non-conference games and were not counted in the league standings.)*		Mississippi Veterans Memorial Stadium; Jackson, MS (rivalry)	ESPN+	W 33–15	32,027
September 21	6:00 p.m.	at Grambling State*		Eddie G. Robinson Memorial Stadium; Grambling, LA	ESPN+	L 20–41	19,085
September 28	6:00 p.m.	at Texas Southern		Shell Energy Stadium; Houston, TX	ESPN+	W 43–14	13,173
October 5	4:00 p.m.	vs. Alabama A&M		Ladd–Peebles Stadium; Mobile, AL	ESPN+	W 45–38	14,956
October 19	2:30 p.m.	No. 25т Florida A&M		Mississippi Veterans Memorial Stadium; Jackson, MS	ESPNU	W 35–21	28,450
October 26	2:00 p.m.	at Bethune–Cookman		Daytona Stadium; Daytona Beach, FL	HBCU GO	W 37–17	10,877
November 2	2:00 p.m.	Arkansas–Pine Bluff^{†}		Mississippi Veterans Memorial Stadium; Jackson, MS	ESPN+	W 41–3	34,932
November 9	2:00 p.m.	Mississippi Valley State		Mississippi Veterans Memorial Stadium; Jackson, MS	ESPN+	W 51–14	13,954
November 16	2:00 p.m.	at Alabama State	No. 23	ASU Stadium; Montgomery, AL	ESPN+	W 16–10	21,798
November 23	2:00 p.m.	at Alcorn State	No. 20	Jack Spinks Stadium; Lorman, MS (Soul Bowl)	ESPN+	W 48–10	22,617
December 7	2:00 p.m.	Southern	No. 18	Mississippi Veterans Memorial Stadium; Jackson, MS (SWAC Championship)	ESPN2	W 41–13	23,765
December 14	11:00 a.m.	vs. No. 20 South Carolina State*	No. 18	Mercedes-Benz Stadium; Atlanta, GA (Celebration Bowl)	ABC	W 28–7	36,823
*Non-conference game; ^{†}Homecoming; Rankings from STATS Poll released prior to the game; All times are in Central time

== Roster ==
2024 Jackson State Tigers football team roster
Players
Coaches
Offense

Pos.	#	Name	Class
RB	0	Travis Terrell Jr.	Fr
WR	1	Rico Powers	Jr
WR	2	Ja'Naylon Dupree	Jr
QB	3	Zy McDonald	Jr
WR	4	Tyquan Henderson	Sr
RB	5	Irv Mulligan	GS
QB	6	Cam'Ron McCoy	So
WR	7	Jameel Gardner Jr.	So
RB	8	JD Martin	Sr
WR	9	Fabian McCray	GS
WR	11	Isaiah Spencer	So
QB	12	Parker Stofa	Fr
WR	13	Richard Mays Jr.	Jr
RB	14	Bryson Moss	Sr
QB	15	Jacobian Morgan	Jr
WR	16	Joanes Fortilien	So
WR	17	Errick Simmons	Sr
QB	18	Ethan Terrell	Fr
WR	19	Kobe Paul	Sr
RB	21	Desmond Moultrie	Sr
RB	22	Nate Blount IV	Fr
WR	26	Javion Posey	GS
RB	27	Ahmad Miller	So
RB	29	Kobe Boykin	Fr
RB	36	Ezequiel Johnson	Jr
TE	45	Kenneth Jiles Jr.	So
RB	49	Emari Matthews	Jr
OL	55	Douglas Fowler	Jr
OL	58	Cameron James	Jr
OL	60	Devin Love	Fr
OL	61	Cyson Burk	Fr
OL	62	Almetrius Smith Jr.	Jr
OL	64	Brian Williams Jr.	Fr
OL	65	Mason Barton	Fr
OL	66	Jackson King	Fr
OL	67	Success Chikezie	Fr
OL	69	Dequarious White	Fr
OL	70	Kirk Ford	Sr
OL	71	Evan Henry	GS
OL	72	Isaiah Villanneuva	Fr
OL	73	Kai Gadson	Fr
OL	74	D'Andre Townes-Blue	Jr
OL	75	Xavion Davis	Fr
OL	76	Antonio Ross Jr.	Fr
OL	77	Bruno Zandamela	So
OL	79	Quaveon Davis	So
TE	81	Jency Riley	Jr
TE	83	Sebastien Saint-Louis	So
TE	85	Darren Bennett	Sr
TE	86	Derek Scott	So
TE	88	Marvin Landy	Sr
WR	89	Marcadi Johnson	Jr

Defense

Pos.	#	Name	Class
DL	0	Jeremiah Williams	Jr
DB	1	Ke'Vric Wiggins Jr.	Sr
DL	2	Joshua Nobles	Jr
DB	3	Robert McDaniel	GS
DL	4	Tru Thompson	Jr
DB	5	Cameron Smith	Jr
DB	6	Esaias Guthrie
LB	7	Reid Pulliam	So
LB	8	Jaeden Ward	Sr
DB	9	B.J. Washington	So
DB	10	Mike Smith III	Fr
LB	11	Allen Walker	GS
DB	12	Nireek Sharpe	Fr
DB	13	Day Day Bright	Sr
DB	16	Micah Cherry	Jr
DB	17	KJ Chisholm	Fr
LB	18	Austin Edmonds	Sr
DB	19	Brandon Mitchell	Fr
LB	23	Javarian Jenkins	Sr
DB	24	Anthony Petty	Sr
DB	25	Shamar Hawkins	Jr
DB	26	Josh Higgins	GS
DB	28	Joe Perkins	Jr
LB	30	Ashton Taylor	So
CB	31	Frankie Dunn	Jr
LB	32	Daved Jones Jr.	Sr
DL	33	John Brown	GS
DL	39	Phillip Webb	Sr
DL	40	Braxton Barney	Fr
LB	43	Jace Ward	Fr
DB	46	Derrell Holston	GS
DL	50	Tymon Wells	Jr
LB	51	J'Cori Hargon	So
LB	54	Earick Williams III	Fr
DL	56	Athen Smith	GS
LB	57	Bryce Owens	Fr
DL	68	Zyon Walker	Sr
DL	90	Dimonyai Lacey	Jr
DL	93	Zalan Barrett	Jr
DL	94	Stanley Cooks	Fr
DL	95	Kazarius Bowie	Sr
DL	96	Zyon Gilmore	Jr
DL	98	Tyas Martin	Jr

Special teams

Pos.	#	Name	Class
K	35	Leilani Armenta	Fr
K/P	37	Donovan Warren	Sr
K/P	38	Gerardo Baeza	Jr
LS	41	Avery Salerno	So
LS	44	Hunter Burns	Sr
K/P	48	Matt Noll	GS

Head coach

- T. C. Taylor

Coordinators/assistant coaches

- Otis Riddley (Associate head coach / Tight ends / General manager)
- Torenzo Quinn (Defensive coordinator / Defensive backs)
- Manny Ramirez (Run Game coordinator / Offensive line)
- Eric Gallon (Running backs)
- Vincent Marshall (Wide receivers)
- Rip Kirk (Quarterbacks)
- Chris Orr (Linebackers)
- Kali James (Defensive Run Game coordinator / Defensive line)
- Mario Magana Jr. (Cornerbacks)
- Javancy Jones (Special Teams coordinator / Outside linebackers)
- Brandon Morton (Director of Recruiting)
- Jeff Weeks (Special Teams / Senior Defensive analyst)

Legend

- (C) Team captain
- (S) Suspended
- (I) Ineligible
- Injured
- Redshirt

Roster
Last update: December 7, 2024

== Game summaries ==
=== at Louisiana-Monroe (FBS) ===
Game One – Jackson State Tigers (0-0) at Louisiana-Monroe Warhawks (FBS) (0-0) – Game summary

Quarter	1	2	3	4	Total
Tigers	0	7	7	0	14
Warhawks (FBS)	7	7	7	9	30

at Malone Stadium • Monroe, LA

- Date: Thursday August 29, 2024
- Game time: 7:00 p.m.
- Game attendance: 11,145
- Referee: Scott Broadway
- TV announcers (ESPN+): Sean Fox (play-by-play) and Desmund Lighten (analyst)

Game information

First quarter

- (2:35) ULM – Davon Wells 11-yard pass from General Booty (Max Larson kick) (Drive: 10 plays, 78 yards, 5:50; Louisiana-Monroe 7-0)

Second quarter

- (10:51) JSU – Joanes Fortillen 41-yard pass from Jacobian Morgan (Gerardo Baeza kick) (Drive: 1 play, 41 yards, 0:10; Tied 7-7)
- (0:14) ULM – Ahmad Hardy 1-yard run (Max Larson kick) (Drive: 9 plays, 42 yards, 4:53; Louisiana-Monroe 14-7)

Third quarter

- (11:41) JSU – Jacobian Morgan 3-yard run (Gerardo Baeza kick) (Drive: 7 plays, 75 yards, 3:19; Tied 14-14)
- (7:32) ULM – James Jones 22-yard run (Max Larson kick) (Drive: 9 plays, 85 yards, 4:04; Louisiana-Monroe 21-14)

Fourth quarter

- (10:21) ULM – Max Larson 39-yard field goal (Drive: 8 plays, 40 yards, 4:33; Louisiana-Monroe 24-14)
- (2:27) ULM – Javon Campbell 28-yard pass from Aidan Armenta (PAT blocked) (Drive: 3 plays, 33 yards, 1:01; Louisiana-Monroe 30-14)

Statistics	JKST	ULM
First downs	16	17
Total yards	51–288	56–336
Rushing yards	22–61	41–204
Passing yards	227	132
Passing: Comp–Att–Int	24–29–1	11–15–0
Time of possession	25:11	34:49

Team	Category	Player	Statistics
Jackson State	Passing	Jacobian Morgan	23/28, 228 yards, TD, INT
Jackson State	Rushing	Ahmad Miller	9 carries, 46 yards
Jackson State	Receiving	Joanes Fortillen	2 receptions, 51 yards, TD
Louisiana-Monroe	Passing	General Booty	10/14, 104 yards, TD
Louisiana-Monroe	Rushing	Ahmad Hardy	19 carries, 103 yards, TD
Louisiana-Monroe	Receiving	Javon Campbell	4 receptions, 83 yards, TD

=== Lane (DII) ===
Game Two – Lane Dragons (DII) (0–0) vs Jackson State Tigers (0–1) – Game summary

Quarter	1	2	3	4	Total
Dragons (DII)	0	0	0	7	7
Tigers	31	17	10	0	58

at Mississippi Veterans Memorial Stadium, Jackson, Mississippi

- Date: Saturday September 7, 2024
- Game time: 6:00 p.m.
- Game weather: Sunny
- Game attendance: 26,700
- Referee: Y. N. Myers III
- TV announcers (TBD): TBD

Game information

First quarter

- (13:20) JKST – Cam'Ron McCoy 20-yard run, Gerardo Baeza kick (Drive: 1 play, 20 yards, 0:07; Jackson State 7–0)
- (9:17) JKST – Marvin Landy 1-yard pass from Cam'Ron McCoy, Gerardo Baeza kick (Drive: 4 plays, 51 yards, 1:59; Jackson State 14–0)
- (6:18) JKST – Ahmad Miller 6-yard run, Gerardo Baeza kick (Drive: 5 plays, 40 yards, 1:50; Jackson State 21–0)
- (2:06) JKST – Gerardo Baeza 45-yard field goal (Drive: 4 plays, -2 yards, 1:30; Jackson State 24–0)
- (0:00) JKST – Cam'Ron McCoy 60-yard run, Gerardo Baeza kick (Drive: 3 plays, 65 yards, 0:54; Jackson State 31–0)

Second quarter

- (11:42) JKST – Joanes Fortilien 28-yard pass from Cam'Ron McCoy, Gerardo Baeza kick (Drive: 3 plays, 45 yards, 1:03; Jackson State 38–0)
- (6:36) JKST – Kobe Paul 4-yard pass from Jacobian Morgan, Gerardo Baeza kick (Drive: 8 plays, 56 yards, 3:18; Jackson State 45–0)
- (0:00) JKST – Gerardo Baeza 43-yard field goal (Drive: 3 plays, 13 yards, 0:37; Jackson State 48–0)

Third quarter

- (9:04) JKST – Isaiah Spencer 55-yard pass from Jacobian Morgan, Gerardo Baeza kick (Drive: 2 plays, 65 yards, 0:49; Jackson State 55–0)
- (5:26) JKST – Gerardo Baeza 33-yard field goal (Drive: 6 plays, 41 yards, 2:34; Jackson State 58–0)

Fourth quarter

- (3:01) LANE – Ike Brown 2-yard run, Marcelo Ortiz kick (Drive: 9 plays, 50 yards, 5:00; Jackson State 58–7)

Statistics	LANE	JKST
First downs	10	16
Total yards	106	434
Rushing yards	75	184
Passing yards	31	250
Passing: Comp–Att–Int	6–23–2	14–20–0
Time of possession	28:18	31:42

Team	Category	Player	Statistics
Lane	Passing	Jerick Gaston	2/9, 21 yards
Lane	Rushing	Ike Brown	10 carries, 52 yards, TD
Lane	Receiving	Kylan Duhe	1 reception, 11 yards
Jackson State	Passing	Jacobian Morgan	9/11, 150 yards, 2 TD
Jackson State	Rushing	Cam'Ron McCoy	6 carries, 107 yards, 2 TD
Jackson State	Receiving	Isaiah Spencer	4 receptions, 107 yards, TD

=== Southern (rivalry) ===
Game Three – Southern Jaguars (1–1) vs Jackson State Tigers (1–1) – Game summary

Quarter	1	2	3	4	Total
Jaguars	0	3	6	6	15
Tigers	10	13	10	0	33

at Mississippi Veterans Memorial Stadium, Jackson, Mississippi

- Date: Saturday September 14, 2024
- Game time: 6:00 p.m.
- Game weather: Sunny
- Game attendance: 32,027
- Referee: Preston Clipper
- TV announcers (ESPN+): Santoria Black (play-by-play) and Mo Carter (analyst)

Game information

First quarter

- (12:35) JKST – Gerardo Baeza 25-yard field goal (Drive: 8 plays, 58 yards, 2:19; Jackson State 3–0)
- (3:50) JKST – J. D. Martin 1-yard run, Gerardo Baeza kick (Drive: 11 plays, 72 yards, 4:59; Jackson State 10–0)

Second quarter

- (14:18) JKST – Marvin Landy 30-yard pass from Jacobian Morgan (Drive: 5 plays, 59 yards, 2:06; Jackson State 16–0)
- (2:49) JKST – Ahmad Miller 30-yard run, Gerardo Baeza kick (Drive: 3 plays, 52 yards, 0:52; Jackson State 23–0)
- (0:36) SOU – Joshua Griffin 29-yard field goal (Drive: 9 plays, 63 yards, 2:13; Jackson State 23–3)

Third quarter

- (9:21) JKST – Gerardo Baeza 39-yard field goal (Drive: 6 plays, 35 yards, 3:11; Jackson State 26–3)
- (6:10) SOU – CJ Russell 3-yard run (Drive: 6 plays, 75 yards, 3:11; Jackson State 26–9)
- (2:23) JKST – Irv Mulligan 5-yard run, Gerardo Baeza kick (Drive: 7 plays, 66 yards, 3:37; Jackson State 33–9)

Fourth quarter

- (7:31) SOU – Jermaine Minor Jr. 16-yard pass from Noah Bodden (Drive: 7 plays, 97 yards, 2:49; Jackson State 33–15)

Statistics	SOU	JKST
First downs	18	19
Total yards	416	399
Rushing yards	29	201
Passing yards	387	198
Passing: Comp–Att–Int	23–39–2	14–25–0
Time of possession	28:45	31:15

Team	Category	Player	Statistics
Southern	Passing	Noah Bodden	17/29, 352 yards, TD, 2 INT
Southern	Rushing	Kendric Rhymes	8 carries, 18 yards
Southern	Receiving	Tyler Kirkwood	3 receptions, 121 yards
Jackson State	Passing	Jacobian Morgan	12/21, 153 yards, TD
Jackson State	Rushing	Irv Mulligan	13 carries, 51 yards, TD
Jackson State	Receiving	Joanes Fortilien	3 receptions, 60 yards

=== at Grambling State ===
Game Four – Jackson State Tigers (2–1) at Grambling State Tigers (2–1) – Game summary

Quarter	1	2	3	4	Total
Jackson State	0	0	0	0	0
Grambling State	0	0	0	0	0

at Eddie G. Robinson Memorial Stadium, Grambling, LA

- Date: Saturday September 21, 2024
- Game time: 6:00 p.m.
- TV: ESPN+

Game information

First quarter
Second quarter
Third quarter
Fourth quarter

Statistics	JKST	GRAM
First downs		
Total yards		
Rushing yards		
Passing yards		
Passing: Comp–Att–Int		
Time of possession		

Team	Category	Player	Statistics
Jackson State	Passing		
Jackson State	Rushing		
Jackson State	Receiving		
Grambling State	Passing		
Grambling State	Rushing		
Grambling State	Receiving		

=== at Texas Southern ===
Game Five – Jackson State Tigers (2–2) vs Texas Southern Tigers (1–2) – Game summary

Quarter	1	2	3	4	Total
Jackson State	0	0	0	0	0
Texas Southern	0	0	0	0	0

at Shell Energy Stadium, Houston, Texas

- Date: Saturday September 28, 2024
- Game time: 6:00 p.m.
- TV announcers (ESPN+): TBD

Game information

First quarter
Second quarter
Third quarter
Fourth quarter

Statistics	JKST	TXSO
First downs		
Total yards		
Rushing yards		
Passing yards		
Passing: Comp–Att–Int		
Time of possession		

Team	Category	Player	Statistics
Jackson State	Passing		
Jackson State	Rushing		
Jackson State	Receiving		
Texas Southern	Passing		
Texas Southern	Rushing		
Texas Southern	Receiving		

=== vs. Alabama A&M ===
Game Six – Jackson State Tigers (3–2) vs Alabama A&M Bulldogs (2–2) – Game summary

Quarter	1	2	3	4	Total
Tigers	0	0	0	0	0
Bulldogs	0	0	0	0	0

at Ladd–Peebles Stadium, Mobile, AL

- Date: Saturday October 5, 2024
- Game time: 4:00 p.m.
- TV announcers (ESPN+): TBD

Game information

First quarter
Second quarter
Third quarter
Fourth quarter

Statistics	JKST	AAMU
First downs		
Total yards		
Rushing yards		
Passing yards		
Passing: Comp–Att–Int		
Time of possession		

Team	Category	Player	Statistics
Jackson State	Passing		
Jackson State	Rushing		
Jackson State	Receiving		
Alabama A&M	Passing		
Alabama A&M	Rushing		
Alabama A&M	Receiving		

=== No. 25т Florida A&M ===
Game Seven – No. 25т Florida A&M Rattlers (3–2) vs Jackson State Tigers (4–2) – Game summary

Quarter	1	2	3	4	Total
No. 25т Rattlers	0	0	0	0	0
Tigers	0	0	0	0	0

at Mississippi Veterans Memorial Stadium, Jackson, MS

- Date: Saturday October 19, 2024
- Game time: 2:30 p.m.
- TV announcers (ESPNU): Tiffany Greene (play-by-play) and Jay Walker (analyst)

Game information

First quarter
Second quarter
Third quarter
Fourth quarter

Statistics	FAMU	JKST
First downs		
Total yards		
Rushing yards		
Passing yards		
Passing: Comp–Att–Int		
Time of possession		

Team	Category	Player	Statistics
Florida A&M	Passing		
Florida A&M	Rushing		
Florida A&M	Receiving		
Jackson State	Passing		
Jackson State	Rushing		
Jackson State	Receiving		

=== at Bethune–Cookman ===
Game Eight – Jackson State Tigers (5–2) vs Bethune–Cookman Wildcats (1–6) – Game summary

Quarter	1	2	3	4	Total
Tigers	0	0	0	0	0
Wildcats	0	0	0	0	0

at Daytona Stadium, Daytona Beach, FL

- Date: Saturday October 26, 2024
- Game time: 2:00 p.m.
- TV announcers (HBCU GO): TBD

Game information

First quarter
Second quarter
Third quarter
Fourth quarter

Statistics	JKST	BCU
First downs		
Total yards		
Rushing yards		
Passing yards		
Passing: Comp–Att–Int		
Time of possession		

Team	Category	Player	Statistics
Jackson State	Passing		
Jackson State	Rushing		
Jackson State	Receiving		
Bethune–Cookman	Passing		
Bethune–Cookman	Rushing		
Bethune–Cookman	Receiving		

=== Arkansas–Pine Bluff ===
Game Nine – Arkansas–Pine Bluff Golden Lions (3–5) vs Jackson State Tigers (6–2) – Game summary

Quarter	1	2	3	4	Total
Golden Lions	0	0	0	0	0
Tigers	0	0	0	0	0

at Mississippi Veterans Memorial Stadium, Jackson, MS

- Date: Saturday November 2, 2024
- Game time: 2:00 p.m.
- TV: ESPN+

Game information

First quarter
Second quarter
Third quarter
Fourth quarter

Statistics	UAPB	JKST
First downs		
Total yards		
Rushing yards		
Passing yards		
Passing: Comp–Att–Int		
Time of possession		

Team	Category	Player	Statistics
Arkansas–Pine Bluff	Passing		
Arkansas–Pine Bluff	Rushing		
Arkansas–Pine Bluff	Receiving		
Jackson State	Passing		
Jackson State	Rushing		
Jackson State	Receiving		

=== Mississippi Valley State ===
Game Ten – Mississippi Valley State Delta Devils (0–9) vs Jackson State Tigers (7–2) – Game summary

Quarter	1	2	3	4	Total
Delta Devils	0	0	0	0	0
Tigers	0	0	0	0	0

at Mississippi Veterans Memorial Stadium, Jackson, MS

- Date: Saturday November 9, 2024
- Game time: 2:00 p.m.
- TV: ESPN+

Game information

First quarter
Second quarter
Third quarter
Fourth quarter

Statistics	MVST	JKST
First downs		
Total yards		
Rushing yards		
Passing yards		
Passing: Comp–Att–Int		
Time of possession		

Team	Category	Player	Statistics
Mississippi Valley State	Passing		
Mississippi Valley State	Rushing		
Mississippi Valley State	Receiving		
Jackson State	Passing		
Jackson State	Rushing		
Jackson State	Receiving		

=== at Alabama State ===
Game Eleven – No. 23 Jackson State Tigers (8–2) vs Alabama State Hornets (5–4) – Game summary

Quarter	1	2	3	4	Total
No. 23 Tigers	0	0	0	0	0
Hornets	0	0	0	0	0

at ASU Stadium, Montgomery, AL

- Date: Saturday November 16, 2024
- Game time: 2:00 PM CST
- TV: ESPN+

Game information

First quarter
Second quarter
Third quarter
Fourth quarter

Statistics	JKST	ALST
First downs		
Total yards		
Rushing yards		
Passing yards		
Passing: Comp–Att–Int		
Time of possession		

Team	Category	Player	Statistics
Jackson State	Passing		
Jackson State	Rushing		
Jackson State	Receiving		
Alabama State	Passing		
Alabama State	Rushing		
Alabama State	Receiving		

=== at Alcorn State (Soul Bowl) ===
Game Twelve – No. 20 Jackson State Tigers (9–2) vs Alcorn State Braves (6–5) – Game summary

Quarter	1	2	3	4	Total
No. 20 Tigers	0	0	0	0	0
Braves	0	0	0	0	0

at Jack Spinks Stadium, Lorman, MS

- Date: Saturday November 23, 2024
- Game time: 2:00 PM CST
- TV: ESPN+

Game information

First quarter
Second quarter
Third quarter
Fourth quarter

Statistics	JKST	ALCN
First downs		
Total yards		
Rushing yards		
Passing yards		
Passing: Comp–Att–Int		
Time of possession		

Team	Category	Player	Statistics
Jackson State	Passing		
Jackson State	Rushing		
Jackson State	Receiving		
Alcorn State	Passing		
Alcorn State	Rushing		
Alcorn State	Receiving		

=== Southern (SWAC Championship / rivalry) ===
Game Thirteen – Southern Jaguars (8–4) vs No. 18 Jackson State Tigers (10–2) (SWAC Championship) – Game summary

Quarter	1	2	3	4	Total
Jaguars	0	0	0	0	0
No. 18 Tigers	0	0	0	0	0

at Mississippi Veterans Memorial Stadium, Jackson, MS

- Date: Saturday December 7, 2024
- Game time: 2:00 p.m.
- Referee: Charles Green
- TV announcers (ESPN2): Tiffany Greene (play-by-play), Jay Walker (analyst), and Coley Harvey (sideline reporter)

Game information

First quarter
Second quarter
Third quarter
Fourth quarter

Statistics	SOU	JKST
First downs		
Total yards		
Rushing yards		
Passing yards		
Passing: Comp–Att–Int		
Time of possession		

Team	Category	Player	Statistics
Southern	Passing		
Southern	Rushing		
Southern	Receiving		
Jackson State	Passing		
Jackson State	Rushing		
Jackson State	Receiving		

=== No. 20 South Carolina State (Celebration Bowl) ===
2024 Celebration Bowl
No. 18 Jackson State Tigers (11–2) vs No. 20 South Carolina State Bulldogs (9–2) – Game summary

Quarter	1	2	3	4	Total
No. 18 Tigers	0	14	0	14	28
No. 20 Bulldogs	0	0	0	7	7

at Mercedes-Benz Stadium, Atlanta, Georgia

- Date: Saturday December 14, 2024
- Game time: 11:00 AM CST
- Game weather: Indoors
- Game attendance: 36,823
- TV: ABC

Game information

First quarter
Second quarter
Third quarter
Fourth quarter

Statistics	JKST	SCST
First downs		
Total yards		
Rushing yards		
Passing yards		
Passing: Comp–Att–Int		
Time of possession		

Team	Category	Player	Statistics
Jackson State	Passing		
Jackson State	Rushing		
Jackson State	Receiving		
South Carolina State	Passing		
South Carolina State	Rushing		
South Carolina State	Receiving		
