= 2024 NCAA Division I FCS football rankings =

Rankings for the 2024 NCAA Division I FCS football season

- Season: 2024
- Postseason: Single-elimination
- Preseason No. 1: South Dakota State
- National champions: North Dakota State
- Conference with most teams in final poll: Big Sky (5)

The 2024 National Collegiate Athletic Association (NCAA) Division I Football Championship Subdivision (FCS) football rankings consists of two human polls, in addition to various publications' preseason polls. Unlike the Football Bowl Subdivision (FBS), college football's governing body, the NCAA, bestows the national championship title thorough a 24-team tournament. The following weekly polls determine the top 25 teams at the NCAA Division I Football Championship Subdivision level of college football for the 2024 season. The STATS Poll is voted on by media members while the Coaches Poll is determined by coaches at the FCS level.

== Legend ==
Legend
	Increase in ranking
	Decrease in ranking
	Not ranked previous week
	Selected for NCAA FCS Playoffs
(Italics)	Number of first place votes
(#–#)	Win–loss record
т	Tied with team above or below also with this symbol

== STATS Poll ==
	Preseason August 5	Week 1 September 2	Week 2 September 9	Week 3 September 16	Week 4 September 23	Week 5 September 30	Week 6 October 7	Week 7 October 14	Week 8 October 21	Week 9 October 28	Week 10 November 4	Week 11 November 11	Week 12 November 18	Week 13 November 25	Final January 7	
1.	South Dakota State (52)	South Dakota State (0–1) (36)	South Dakota State (1–1) (44)	South Dakota State (2–1) (41)	South Dakota State (3–1) (40)	South Dakota State (3–1) (38)	South Dakota State (4–1) (36)	South Dakota State (5–1) (38)	North Dakota State (7–1) (40)	North Dakota State (8–1) (43)	North Dakota State (9–1) (43)	North Dakota State (9–1) (42)	North Dakota State (10–1) (41)	Montana State (12–0) (51)	North Dakota State (14–2) (56)	1.
2.	North Dakota State (3)	North Dakota State (0–1) (11)	North Dakota State (1–1) (6)	North Dakota State (2–1) (5)	North Dakota State (3–1) (5)	North Dakota State (4–1) (10)	North Dakota State (5–1) (14)	North Dakota State (6–1) (8)	Montana State (8–0) (16)	Montana State (8–0) (13)	Montana State (9–0) (13)	Montana State (10–0) (14)	Montana State (11–0) (15)	South Dakota State (10–2) (1)	Montana State (15–1)	2.
3.	Montana	Montana State (2–0) (8)	Montana State (3–0) (6)	Montana State (3–0) (7)	Montana State (4–0) (6)	Montana State (5–0) (8)	Montana State (6–0) (6)	Montana State (7–0) (10)	South Dakota State (5–2)	South Dakota State (6–2)	South Dakota State (7–2)	South Dakota State (8–2)	South Dakota State (9–2)	North Dakota State (10–2) (2)	South Dakota State (12–3)	3.
4.	Montana State (1)	Montana (1–0) (1)	Idaho (1–1)	Idaho (2–1) (3)	Idaho (3–1) (5)	South Dakota (3–1)	South Dakota (4–1)	South Dakota (5–1)	South Dakota (6–1)	UC Davis (7–1)	UC Davis (8–1)	UC Davis (9–1)	South Dakota (8–2)	South Dakota (9–2) (2)	South Dakota (11–3)	4.
5.	South Dakota	Villanova (1–0)	Villanova (2–0)	Villanova (3–0)	South Dakota (2–1)	Central Arkansas (4–1)	Villanova (5–1)	Villanova (5–1)	UC Davis (7–1)	South Dakota (6–2)	South Dakota (6–2)	South Dakota (7–2)	UC Davis (9–2)	UC Davis (10–2)	UC Davis (11–3)	5.
6.	Villanova	South Dakota (1–0)	South Dakota (1–1)	South Dakota (1–1)	Villanova (3–1)	Villanova (4–1)	UC Davis (5–1)	UC Davis (6–1)	Southeast Missouri State (7–1)	Southeast Missouri State (8–1)	Southeast Missouri State (8–1)	Incarnate Word (8–2)	Incarnate Word (9–2)	Incarnate Word (10–2)	Incarnate Word (11–3)	6.
7.	Idaho	Idaho (0–1)	Central Arkansas (1–1)	Southern Illinois (2–1)	Central Arkansas (3–1)	North Dakota (4–1)	Idaho (4–2)	Mercer (6–0)	North Dakota (5–2)	Tarleton State (7–1)	Montana (7–2)	Mercer (9–1)	Idaho (8–3)	Idaho (9–3)	Idaho (10–4)	7.
8.	Sacramento State	Sacramento State (0–1)	Montana (1–1)	Central Arkansas (2–1)	Montana (3–1)	Montana (4–1)	Mercer (5–0)	Southeast Missouri State (6–1)	Tarleton State (6–1)	Montana (6–2)	Incarnate Word (7–2)	Idaho (7–3)	Mercer (9–2)	Mercer (10–2)	Mercer (11–3)	8.
9.	Chattanooga	Central Arkansas (0–1)	Southern Illinois (1–1)	Montana (2–1)	North Dakota (3–1)	UC Davis (4–1)	North Dakota (4–2)	North Dakota (4–2)	Montana (5–2)	Incarnate Word (6–2)	Idaho (6–3)	Villanova (8–2)	Montana (8–3)	Richmond (10–2)	Rhode Island (11–3)	9.
10.	Southern Illinois	Southern Illinois (0–1)	North Dakota (1–1)	North Dakota (2–1)	Sacramento State (2–2)	Idaho (3–2)	Abilene Christian (4–2)	Tarleton State (6–1)	Incarnate Word (5–2)	Idaho (6–3)	Mercer (8–1)	Montana (7–3)	Richmond (9–2)	Rhode Island (10–2)	Montana (9–5)	10.
11.	Central Arkansas	Chattanooga (0–1)	Sacramento State (0–2)	Sacramento State (1–2)	William & Mary (3–1)	Mercer (5–0)	Southeast Missouri State (5–1)	Montana (5–2)	Idaho (5–3)	Central Arkansas (6–2)	Rhode Island (8–1)	Richmond (8–2)	Abilene Christian (8–3)	Illinois State (9–3)	Illinois State (10–4)	11.
12.	Furman	Incarnate Word (1–0)	Incarnate Word (1–1)	William & Mary (2–1)	Mercer (4–0)	William & Mary (4–1)	Central Arkansas (4–2)	Central Arkansas (5–2)	Central Arkansas (5–2)	Mercer (7–1)	Villanova (7–2)	Southeast Missouri State (8–2)	Southeast Missouri State (9–2)	Villanova (9–3)	Villanova (10–4)	12.
13.	Richmond	William & Mary (1–0)	William & Mary (1–1)	UC Davis (2–1)	Southeast Missouri State (3–1)	Southeast Missouri State (4–1)	Tarleton State (5–1)	Idaho (4–3)	Villanova (5–2)	Villanova (6–2)	Richmond (7–2)	Tarleton State (8–2)	Rhode Island (9–2)	Montana (8–4)	Tarleton State (10–4)	13.
14.	Incarnate Word	Richmond (0–1)	Chattanooga (0–2)	Mercer (3–0)	UC Davis (3–1)	Tarleton State (4–1)	Montana (4–2)	Incarnate Word (4–2)	Mercer (6–1)	Rhode Island (7–1)	Tarleton State (7–2)	Abilene Christian (7–3)	Illinois State (8–3)	Tarleton State (9–3)	Abilene Christian (9–5)	14.
15.	William & Mary	Furman (0–1)	UC Davis (1–1)	Incarnate Word (1–2)	Incarnate Word (2–2)	Incarnate Word (2–2)	Incarnate Word (3–2)	William & Mary (4–2)	Rhode Island (6–1)	North Dakota (5–3)	Abilene Christian (6–3)	Rhode Island (8–2)	Villanova (8–3)	Abilene Christian (8–4)	Richmond (10–3)	15.
16.	Albany	Albany (1–0)	Tarleton State (2–1)	Tarleton State (2–1)	Tarleton State (3–1)	Abilene Christian (3–2)	Illinois State (4–2)	Rhode Island (5–1)	William & Mary (5–2)	Richmond (6–2)	Central Arkansas (6–3)	Stony Brook (8–2)	Tarleton State (8–3)	Southeast Missouri State (9–3)	Southeast Missouri State (9–4)	16.
17.	Lafayette	Western Carolina (0–1)	Albany (1–1)	Illinois State (2–1)	Southern Illinois (2–2)	Sacramento State (2–3)	William & Mary (4–2)	Abilene Christian (4–3)	Abilene Christian (5–3)	Abilene Christian (5–3)	Stony Brook (7–2)	Illinois State (7–3)	Harvard (8–1)	Northern Arizona (8–4)	UT Martin (9–5)	17.
18.	UC Davis	UC Davis (0–1)	Illinois State (1–1)	Lafayette (2–1)	Illinois State (3–1)	Illinois State (3–2)	Sacramento State (2–3)	Richmond (4–2)	Richmond (5–2)	Chattanooga (5–3)	Illinois State (6–3)	UT Martin (7–3)	Stony Brook (8–3)	Jackson State (10–2)	Jackson State (12–2)	18.
19.	Illinois State	Lafayette (0–1)	Lafayette (1–1)	Abilene Christian (2–1)	Lamar (3–1)	Southern Illinois (2–3)	Rhode Island (4–1)	Chattanooga (3–3)	Chattanooga (4–3)	North Carolina Central (6–2)	UT Martin (6–3)	Chattanooga (6–4)	Duquesne (8–2)	New Hampshire (8–4)	Tennessee State (9–4)	19.
20.	Western Carolina	Tarleton State (1–1)	Weber State (1–1)	Albany (1–2)	Abilene Christian (2–2)	Rhode Island (3–1)	Weber State (3–3)	North Carolina Central (5–2)	North Carolina Central (5–2)	Stony Brook (6–2)	William & Mary (6–3)	Harvard (7–1)	Jackson State (9–2)	South Carolina State (9–2)	Lehigh (9–4)	20.
21.	Tarleton State	Illinois State (0–1)	Youngstown State (1–1)	Southeast Missouri State (2–1)	Albany (1–2)	New Hampshire (3–1)	Richmond (4–2)	Illinois State (4–3)	Illinois State (5–3)	Illinois State (5–3)	North Dakota (5–4)	East Tennessee State (6–4)	Northern Arizona (7–4)	Tennessee State (9–3)	Eastern Kentucky (8–5)	21.
22.	Weber State	Nicholls (0–1)	Elon (1–1)	Lamar (2–1)	Rhode Island (3–1)	McNeese (4–2)	Lamar (3–2)	Dartmouth (4–0)	Dartmouth (5–0)	Dartmouth (6–0)	Western Carolina (5–4)	Duquesne (7–2)	UT Martin (7–4)	Eastern Kentucky (8–4)	Northern Arizona (8–5)	22.
23.	Nicholls	North Dakota (0–1)	Mercer (2–0)	Chattanooga (0–3)	Wofford (2–1)	East Tennessee State (3–2)	Chattanooga (2–3)	East Tennessee State (4–3)	East Tennessee State (4–3)	East Tennessee State (5–3)	Chattanooga (5–4)	Jackson State (8–2)	South Carolina State (8–2)	UT Martin (8–4)	New Hampshire (8–5)	23.
24.	North Dakota	Weber State (0–1)	Nicholls (0–2)	Western Carolina (1–2)	New Hampshire (3–1)	Lamar (3–2)	Northern Arizona (3–3)	New Hampshire (4–2)	Western Carolina (4–3)	William & Mary (5–3)	Harvard (6–1)	Central Arkansas (6–4)	New Hampshire (7–4)	Stony Brook (8–4)	South Carolina State (9–3)	24.
25.	Youngstown State	Youngstown State (0–1)	Abilene Christian (1–1)	Northern Iowa (2–1)	Weber State (2–2)	Northern Arizona (3–2)	North Carolina Central (4–2)	Florida A&M (3–2) т UT Martin (4–3) т	Tennessee State (6–2)	Tennessee State (6–2)	Duquesne (6–2)	Northern Arizona (6–4)	Eastern Kentucky (7–4)	Harvard (8–2)	Harvard (8–2)	25.
	Preseason August 5	Week 1 September 2	Week 2 September 9	Week 3 September 16	Week 4 September 23	Week 5 September 30	Week 6 October 7	Week 7 October 14	Week 8 October 21	Week 9 October 28	Week 10 November 4	Week 11 November 11	Week 12 November 18	Week 13 November 25	Final January 7	
		None	Dropped: No. 14 Richmond; No. 15 Furman; No. 17 Western Carolina	Dropped: No. 20 Weber State; No. 21 Youngstown State; No. 22 Elon; No. 24 Nicholls	Dropped: No. 18 Lafayette; No. 23 Chattanooga; No. 24 Western Carolina; No. 25 Northern Iowa	Dropped: No. 21 Albany; No. 23 Wofford; No. 25 Weber State	Dropped: No. 19 Southern Illinois; No. 21 New Hampshire; No. 22 McNeese; No. 23 East Tennessee State	Dropped: No. 18 Sacramento State; No. 20 Weber State; No. 22 Lamar; No. 24 Northern Arizona	Dropped: No. 24 New Hampshire; No. 25т Florida A&M; No. 25т UT Martin	Dropped: No. 24 Western Carolina	Dropped: No. 19 North Carolina Central; No. 22 Dartmouth; No. 23 East Tennessee State; No. 25 Tennessee State	Dropped: No. 20 William & Mary; No. 21 North Dakota; No. 22 Western Carolina	Dropped: No. 19 Chattanooga; No. 21 East Tennessee State; No. 24 Central Arkansas	Dropped: No. 19 Duquesne	Dropped: No. 24 Stony Brook	

== Coaches Poll ==
	Preseason August 12	Week 1 September 3	Week 2 September 9	Week 3 September 16	Week 4 September 23	Week 5 September 30	Week 6 October 7	Week 7 October 14	Week 8 October 21	Week 9 October 28	Week 10 November 4	Week 11 November 11	Week 12 November 18	Week 13 November 25	Final January 7	
1.	South Dakota State (25)	South Dakota State (0–1) (17)	South Dakota State (1–1) (22)	South Dakota State (2–1) (22)	South Dakota State (3–1) (22)	South Dakota State (3–1) (21)	South Dakota State (4–1) (21)	South Dakota State (5–1) (21)	North Dakota State (7–1) (24)	North Dakota State (8–1) (24)	North Dakota State (9–1) (24)	North Dakota State (9–1) (24)	North Dakota State (10–1) (23)	Montana State (12–0) (23)	North Dakota State (14–2) (16)	1.
2.	North Dakota State	North Dakota State (0–1) (5)	North Dakota State (1–1) (2)	North Dakota State (2–1) (1)	North Dakota State (3–1) (1)	North Dakota State (4–1) (3)	North Dakota State (5–1) (3)	North Dakota State (6–1) (2)	Montana State (8–0) (2)	Montana State (8–0) (2)	Montana State (9–0) (2)	Montana State (10–0) (2)	Montana State (11–0) (3)	South Dakota State (10–2) (2)	Montana State (15–1)	2.
3.	Montana	Montana State (2–0) (4)	Montana State (3–0) (2)	Montana State (3–0) (3)	Montana State (4–0) (2)	Montana State (5–0) (1)	Montana State (6–0) (2)	Montana State (7–0) (3)	South Dakota State (5–2)	South Dakota State (6–2)	South Dakota State (7–2)	South Dakota State (8–2)	South Dakota State (9–2)	South Dakota (9–2)	South Dakota State (12–3)	3.
4.	Montana State	Montana (1–0)	Villanova (2–0)	Idaho (2–1)	Idaho (3–1) (1)	South Dakota (3–1)	South Dakota (4–1)	South Dakota (5–1)	South Dakota (6–1)	UC Davis (7–1)	UC Davis (8–1)	UC Davis (9–1)	South Dakota (8–2)	North Dakota State (10–2)	South Dakota (11–3)	4.
5.	South Dakota	Villanova (1–0)	Idaho (1–1)	Villanova (3–0)	South Dakota (2–1)	Villanova (4–1)	Villanova (5–1)	Villanova (5–1)	UC Davis (7–1)	South Dakota (6–2)	South Dakota (6–2)	South Dakota (7–2)	UC Davis (9–2)	UC Davis (10–2)	UC Davis (11–3)	5.
6.	Villanova	South Dakota (1–0)	South Dakota (1–1)	South Dakota (1–1)	Villanova (3–1)	North Dakota (4–1)	UC Davis (5–1)	UC Davis (6–1)	Southeast Missouri State (7–1)	Southeast Missouri State (8–1)	Southeast Missouri State (8–1)	Incarnate Word (8–2)	Incarnate Word (9–2)	Incarnate Word (10–2)	Incarnate Word (11–3)	6.
7.	Idaho	Idaho (0–1)	Central Arkansas (1–1)	Southern Illinois (2–1)	Central Arkansas (3–1)	Central Arkansas (4–1)	Mercer (5–0)	Mercer (6–0)	North Dakota (5–2)	Tarleton State (7–1)	Montana (7–2)	Richmond (8–2)	Richmond (9–2)	Richmond (10–2)	Mercer (11–3)	7.
8.	Chattanooga	Sacramento State (0–1)	Southern Illinois (1–1)	Central Arkansas (2–1)	North Dakota (3–1)	UC Davis (4–1)	Idaho (4–2)	Southeast Missouri State (6–1)	Tarleton State (6–1)	Montana (6–2)	Incarnate Word (7–2)	Villanova (8–2)	Idaho (8–3)	Idaho (9–3)	Idaho (10–4)	8.
9.	Furman	Central Arkansas (0–1)	Montana (1–1)	North Dakota (2–1)	Montana (3–1)	Montana (4–1)	Southeast Missouri State (5–1)	Tarleton State (6–1)	Montana (5–2)	Central Arkansas (6–2)	Richmond (7–2)	Mercer (9–1)	Mercer (9–2)	Mercer (10–2)	Villanova (10–4)	9.
10.	Sacramento State	Chattanooga (0–1)	North Dakota (1–1)	Montana (2–1)	Sacramento State (2–2)	William & Mary (4–1)	North Dakota (4–2)	North Dakota (4–2)	Central Arkansas (5–2)	Incarnate Word (6–2)	Rhode Island (8–1)	Idaho (7–3)	Montana (8–3)	Illinois State (9–3)	Illinois State (10–4)	10.
11.	Southern Illinois	Incarnate Word (1–0)	Sacramento State (0–2)	Sacramento State (1–2)	UC Davis (3–1)	Mercer (5–0)	Tarleton State (5–1)	Montana (5–2)	Incarnate Word (5–2)	Idaho (6–3)	Villanova (7–2)	Montana (7–3)	Southeast Missouri State (9–2)	Villanova (9–3)	Rhode Island (11–3)	11.
12.	Richmond	Southern Illinois (0–1)	UC Davis (1–1)	UC Davis (2–1)	William & Mary (3–1)	Idaho (3–2)	Abilene Christian (4–2)	Central Arkansas (5–2)	Idaho (5–3)	Richmond (6–2)	Idaho (6–3)	Tarleton State (8–2)	Abilene Christian (8–3)	Rhode Island (10–2)	Tarleton State (10–4)	12.
13.	Central Arkansas	Albany (1–0)	William & Mary (1–1)	William & Mary (2–1)	Mercer (4–0)	Southeast Missouri State (4–1)	Central Arkansas (4–2)	Incarnate Word (4–2)	Richmond (5–2)	Villanova (6–2)	Mercer (8–1)	Southeast Missouri State (8–2)	Illinois State (8–3)	Montana (8–4)	Montana (9–5)	13.
14.	Albany	William & Mary (1–0)	Incarnate Word (1–1)	Lafayette (2–1)	Southeast Missouri State (3–1)	Tarleton State (4–1)	Montana (4–2)	Idaho (4–3)	Villanova (5–2)	Rhode Island (7–1)	Tarleton State (7–2)	Missouri State (8–2)	Villanova (8–3)	Tarleton State (9–3)	Abilene Christian (9–5)	14.
15.	Incarnate Word	Richmond (0–1)	Albany (1–1)	Illinois State (2–1)	Illinois State (3–1)	Incarnate Word (2–2)	Incarnate Word (3–2)	Richmond (4–2)	William & Mary (5–2)	North Dakota (5–3)	Missouri State (7–2)	Abilene Christian (7–3)	Rhode Island (9–2)	Jackson State (10–2)	Jackson State (12–2)	15.
16.	William & Mary	Furman (0–1)	Chattanooga (0–2)	Mercer (3–0)	Tarleton State (3–1)	New Hampshire (3–1)	Illinois State (4–2)	William & Mary (4–2)	Rhode Island (6–1)	Mercer (7–1)	Abilene Christian (6–3)	Illinois State (7–3)	Tarleton State (8–3)	Southeast Missouri State (9–3)	Richmond (10–3)	16.
17.	UC Davis	Western Carolina (0–1)	Tarleton State (2–1)	Tarleton State (2–1)	Southern Illinois (2–2)	Abilene Christian (3–1)	Richmond (4–2)	Rhode Island (5–1)	Mercer (6–1)	Missouri State (6–2)	Illinois State (6–3)	Stony Brook (8–2)	Jackson State (9–2)	Abilene Christian (8–4)	Southeast Missouri State (9–4)	17.
18.	Lafayette	UC Davis (0–1)	Lafayette (1–1)	Incarnate Word (1–2)	Incarnate Word (2–2)	Northern Iowa (2–2)	William & Mary (4–2)	Florida A&M (3–2)	Missouri State (5–2)	Abilene Christian (5–3)	Stony Brook (7–2)	Rhode Island (8–2)	Missouri State (8–3)	South Carolina State (9–2)	UT Martin (9–5)	18.
19.	Western Carolina	Lafayette (0–1)	Illinois State (1–1)	Northern Iowa (2–1)	Northern Iowa (2–2)	Illinois State (3–2)	Florida A&M (3–2)	New Hampshire (4–2)	Abilene Christian (5–3)	Illinois State (5–3)	Central Arkansas (6–3)	UT Martin (7–3)	Duquesne (8–2)	Tennessee State (9–3)	Tennessee State (9–4)	19.
20.	Illinois State	North Dakota (0–1)	Youngstown State (1–1)	Florida A&M (2–1)	New Hampshire (3–1)	Sacramento State (2–3)	Sacramento State (2–3)	Missouri State (4–2)	Illinois State (5–3)	Stony Brook (6–2)	Jackson State (7–2)	Jackson State (8–2)	Stony Brook (8–3)	UT Martin (8–4)	South Carolina State (8–5)	20.
21.	Tarleton State	Tarleton State (1–1)	Northern Iowa (2–0)	Southeast Missouri State (2–1)	Florida A&M (2–2)	Richmond (3–2)	Rhode Island (4–1)	Abilene Christian (4–3) т	North Carolina Central (5–2)	North Carolina Central (6–2)	William & Mary (6–3)	Duquesne (7–2)	Harvard (8–1) т	Missouri State (8–4)	Lehigh (9–4)	21.
22.	North Dakota	Illinois State (0–1)	Florida A&M (2–1)	Albany (1–2)	Abilene Christian (2–2)	Florida A&M (2–2)	New Hampshire (3–2)	North Carolina Central (5–2) т	Dartmouth (5–0)	Dartmouth (6–0)	UT Martin (6–3)	Harvard (7–1)	South Carolina State (8–2) т	Northern Arizona (8–4)	Northern Arizona (8–5)	22.
23.	Youngstown State	Youngstown State (0–1)	Nicholls (0–2)	Abilene Christian (2–1)	Albany (1–2) т	Southern Illinois (2–3)	Weber State (3–3)	Illinois State (4–3)	Jackson State (5–2)	Jackson State (6–2)	North Dakota (5–4)	South Carolina State (7–2)	Butler (9–2)	North Carolina Central (8–3)	Missouri State (8–4)	23.
24.	Nicholls	Florida A&M (2–0)	Mercer (2–0)	Chattanooga (0–3)	Richmond (2–2) т	McNeese (4–2)	North Carolina Central (4–2)	Dartmouth (4–0)	Stony Brook (5–2)	William & Mary (5–3)	Duquesne (6–2)	Dartmouth (7–1)	UT Martin (7–4)	New Hampshire (8–4)	New Hampshire (8–5)	24.
25.	Florida A&M (1)	Nicholls (0–1)	Weber State (1–1)	Youngstown State (1–2)	Lamar (3–1)	Rhode Island (3–1)	Missouri State (3–2)	Jackson State (4–2)	Chattanooga (4–3)	Chattanooga (5–3)	Harvard (6–1)	Butler (8–2) т Chattanooga (6–4)т	Tennessee State (8–3)	Duquesne (8–3)	Eastern Kentucky (8–5)	25.
	Preseason August 12	Week 1 September 3	Week 2 September 9	Week 3 September 16	Week 4 September 23	Week 5 September 30	Week 6 October 7	Week 7 October 14	Week 8 October 21	Week 9 October 28	Week 10 November 4	Week 11 November 11	Week 12 November 18	Week 13 November 25	Final January 7	
		None	Dropped: No. 15 Richmond; No. 16 Furman; No. 17 Western Carolina	Dropped: No. 23 Nicholls; No. 25 Weber State	Dropped: No. 14 Lafayette; No. 24 Chattanooga; No. 25 Youngstown State	Dropped: No. 23т Albany; No. 25 Lamar	Dropped: No. 18 Northern Iowa; No. 23 Southern Illinois; No. 24 McNeese	Dropped: No. 20 Sacramento State; No. 23 Weber State	Dropped: No. 18 Florida A&M; No. 19 New Hampshire	None	Dropped: No. 21 North Carolina Central; No. 22 Dartmouth; No. 25 Chattanooga	Dropped: No. 19 Central Arkansas; No. 21 William & Mary; No. 23 North Dakota	Dropped: No. 24 Dartmouth; No. 25т Chattanooga	Dropped: No. 20 Stony Brook; No. 21т Harvard; No. 23 Butler	Dropped: No. 23 North Carolina Central; No. 25 Duquesne	
