= 2025 Tennessee State Tigers football team =

American college football season

2025 Tennessee State Tigers football
- Conference: OVC–Big South Football Association
- Record: 2–10 (0–8 OVC–Big South)
- Head coach: Reggie Barlow (1st season)
- Offensive coordinator: Shannon Harris (1st season)
- Co-offensive coordinator: Toriano Morgan (1st season)
- Defensive coordinator: Gregg Williams (1st season)
- Home stadium: Nissan Stadium

2025 OVC–Big South football standings
	Conf.			Overall
Team	W		L	W		L
No. 16 Tennessee Tech $^	8	–	0	11	–	2
UT Martin	6	–	2	6	–	6
Gardner–Webb	5	–	3	7	–	5
Lindenwood	5	–	3	6	–	6
Charleston Southern	4	–	4	5	–	7
Southeast Missouri State	3	–	5	4	–	8
Western Illinois	3	–	5	4	–	8
Eastern Illinois	2	–	6	3	–	8
Tennessee State	0	–	8	2	–	10
$ – Conference champion; ^ – FCS playoff participant; Rankings from STATS Poll

The 2025 Tennessee State Tigers football team represented Tennessee State University as a member of the OVC–Big South Football Association during the 2025 NCAA Division I FCS football season. They were led by first year head coach Reggie Barlow. The Tigers played their home games at Nissan Stadium in Nashville, Tennessee.

== Offseason ==
=== Preseason poll ===
The Big South-OVC Conference released their preseason poll on July 16, 2025. The Tigers were picked to finish eight in the conference.

=== Transfers ===
==== Outgoing ====
Player	Position	Destination
Jordan Gant	RB	Akron
Kaleob Onyeahialam	OL	Alabama A&M
Saidou Ba	OL	Austin Peay
Alexis Sanchez	OL	Bowling Green
Eriq George	DL	Bowling Green
Jalen McClendon	DB	Bowling Green
Kaderris Roberts	RB	Bowling Green
Caden Marshall	LB	Bowling Green
Jourden Hale-Frater	OL	Eastern Illinois
Blake Gamez	OL	Eastern Kentucky
Dion Villiers	DB	Florida A&M
Alex Valbuena	OL	Jackson State
Ace Meadows	OL	Jackson State
Jordan Helton	S	Jackson State
Gerald Bullock	TE	Kennesaw State
Boogie Trotter	DB	Marshall
Jalen Bell	DL	Memphis
Jamari Freeman	OL	Mercer
Hadine Diaby	OL	Nevada
Adam Damante	QB	New Mexico State
Mecca Carr-Bordeaux	DL	North Carolina A&T
Tevin Carter	QB	Prairie View A&M
Kheagian Heckaman	TE	Prairie View A&M
Sanders Ellis	LB	Purdue
CJ Evans	RB	Samford
Tucker Kyne	TE	Tennessee Tech
Bryant Williams	WR	Tennessee Tech
Connor Meadows	OL	UCF
Jordan Buchanan	DB	UNLV
David Jones	DB	UTEP
Cameron Blaylock	DT	UTSA
Karate Brenson	WR	Wake Forest
Jaden McGill	RB	Western Kentucky
Malik Billingsley	WR	Unknown
Tyler Moore	DL	Unknown
Ahmed Mohamed	P/K	Unknown
Ro Abercrombie	TE	Withdrawn

==== Incoming ====
Player	Position	Previous school
Jackson Howell	OL	Alabama
Ravon Johnson	DE	Alabama A&M
Luke Harkless	WR	Alabama State
Adam Damante	QB	Arizona
Jack Brandon	QB	Boston College
Jonathan Palmer	QB	Gardner–Webb
Jesse Igwe	OL	Gardner–Webb
Freddy Perez	K	Georgia Military
Breon Brown	OL	James Madison
Jayden Cook	DB	Kansas State
Denzel Holder	OL	Kilgore
Brock Montgomery	WR	Marshall
Tyson Edwards	WR	Memphis
James Stewart	DE	Middle Tennessee
Caleb Reid	LB	Middle Tennessee
Shamar Crawford	OL	Middle Tennessee
Syncere Safeeullah	DB	Nebraska
Alexis Sanchez	OL	Northern Arizona
Braelen Perry	DT	Prairie View A&M
Shaun Ayers	DT	Sacred Heart
Gavin Forsha	LB	South Alabama
Kendric Rhymes	RB	Southern
Brendan Hale	DB	Southern Utah
Alijah Bivans	LB	Towson
Caleb McCreary	QB	Troy
Jelani Willis	LB	Western Michigan

=== Recruiting class ===
Name	Position	Height	Weight	Hometown	High School	Source
Devaughn Slaughter	ATH	6-0	160	Indianapolis, IN	Cathedral	
Christopher Barnett	OL	6-4	280	Murfreesboro, TN	Blackman	
Steven Nelson	OL	6-3	265	Murfreesboro, TN	Rockvale	
Jaylon Price	DE	6-3	220	Sunflower, MS	Southwest Mississippi CC	
Parker Harden	OL	6-4	330	Pickerington, OH	Pickerington Central	
Jayden Guy	WR	6-0	165	Murfreesboro, TN	Blackman	
Brandon Collins	DT	6-2	235	Nashville, TN	Ensworth	
Tyson Craig	ATH	5-11	180	Lawrenceville, GA	Archer	
Nick Cyrus	QB	6-6	190	Brooklyn, NY	South Shore	

=== Coaching staff additions ===
Name	New Position	Previous Team	Previous Position	Source
Reggie Barlow	Head coach	DC Defenders	Head coach	
Gregg Williams	Defensive coordinator	DC Defenders	Defensive coordinator	
Shannon Harris	Co-Offensive coordinator/Quarterbacks	DC Defenders	Head coach	
Toriano Morgan	Co-Offensive coordinator/Running Backs	Edward Waters	Head coach	
Cedric Thornton	Associate head coach/Linebackers	Alabama A&M	Defensive tackles/Special teams	

== Schedule ==
Date	Time	Opponent	Site	TV	Result	Attendance
August 30	3:30 p.m.	North Carolina A&T*	Nissan Stadium; Nashville, TN (John Merritt Classic)	ESPN+	W 24–21	8,865
September 6	1:30 p.m.	No. 1 North Dakota State*	Nissan Stadium; Nashville, TN	ESPN+	L 3–59	8,569
September 13	3:30 p.m.	Alabama A&M*	Nissan Stadium; Nashville, TN	ESPN+	L 21–23	10,208
September 27	3:30 p.m.	No. 13 Tennessee Tech	Nissan Stadium; Nashville, TN (Sgt. York Trophy)	ESPN+	L 8–35	2,137
October 4	2:00 p.m.	at Eastern Illinois	O'Brien Field; Charleston, IL	ESPN+	L 7–31	3,315
October 11	3:00 p.m.	at Southeast Missouri State	Houck Stadium; Cape Girardeau, MO	ESPN+	L 12–28	2,653
October 18	4:30 p.m.	Howard*^{†}	Nissan Stadium; Nashville, TN	ESPN+	W 24–7	14,056
October 25	1:30 p.m.	Western Illinois	Nissan Stadium; Nashville, TN	ESPN+	L 16–17	1,129
November 1	3:30 p.m.	Lindenwood	Nissan Stadium; Nashville, TN	ESPN+	L 13–35	1,006
November 8	1:00 p.m.	at UT Martin	Graham Stadium; Martin, TN (Sgt. York Trophy)	ESPN+	L 7–26	3,518
November 15	1:30 p.m.	Gardner–Webb	Nissan Stadium; Nashville, TN	ESPN+	L 14–30	1,667
November 22	1:00 p.m.	at Charleston Southern	Buccaneer Field; North Charleston, SC	ESPN+	L 6–7	3,678
*Non-conference game; ^{†}Homecoming; Rankings from STATS Poll released prior to the game; All times are in Central time

== Game summaries ==
=== vs. North Carolina A&T ===
Game One – North Carolina A&T Aggies (0–0) at Tennessee State Tigers (0–0) – Game summary

Quarter	1	2	3	4	Total
Aggies	7	7	0	7	21
Tigers	7	3	7	7	24

at Nissan Stadium • Nashville, TN

- Date: Saturday August 30, 2025
- Game time: 3:30 PM CDT
- Game weather: Weather: Sunny • Temp: 85 °F (29 °C)
- Game attendance: 8,865
- Referee: Brandon McCain
- TV announcers (ESPN+): Dan Laing (play-by-play) and Darren Arbet (analyst)

Game information

First quarter

- (7:07) NCAT – Wesley Graves 40-yard rush (Andrew Brown kick) (Drive: 9 plays, 85 yards, 4:35; NCAT 7-0)
- (6:51) TNST – DeVaughn Slaughter 82-yard pass from Johathan Palmer (Freddy Perez kick) (Drive: 1 play, 82 yards, 0:11; Tied 7-7)

Second quarter

- (4:08) TNST – Freddy Perez 41-yard field goal (Drive: 7 plays, 1 yard, 3:10; TNST 10-7)
- (0:12) NCAT – Braxton Thomas 1-yard rush (Andrew Brown kick) (Drive: 4 plays, 33 yards, 1:08; NCAT 14-10)

Third quarter

- (5:51) TNST – Kendric Rhymes 60-yard rush (Freddy Perez kick) (Drive: 1 play, 60 yards, 0:10; TNST 17-14)

Fourth quarter

- (14:19) TNST – Kendric Rhymes 51-yard rush (Freddy Perez kick) (Drive: 3 plays, 57 yards, 0:50; TNST 24-14)
- (9:58) NCAT – Amonte Jones 66-yard pass from Braxton Thomas (Andrew Brown kick) (Drive: 7 plays, 83 yards, 4:17; TNST 24-21)

Statistics	NCAT	TNST
First downs	15	11
Total yards	335	252
Rushing yards	125	129
Passing yards	210	123
Passing: Comp–Att–Int	16–22–0	11–21–1
Time of possession	32:55	27:05

Team	Category	Player	Statistics
North Carolina A&T	Passing	Braxton Thomas	11/13, 169 yards, 1 TD
North Carolina A&T	Rushing	Wesley Graves	14 carries, 69 yards, 1 TD
North Carolina A&T	Receiving	Amonte Jones	4 receptions, 91 yards, 1 TD
Tennessee State	Passing	Jonathan Palmer	11/21, 123 yards, 1 TD, 1 INT
Tennessee State	Rushing	Kendric Rhymes	21 carries, 174 yards, 2 TD
Tennessee State	Receiving	DeVaughn Slaughter	4 receptions, 102 yards, 1 TD

=== vs. No. 1 North Dakota State ===
Game Two – No. 1 North Dakota State Bison (1–0) at Tennessee State Tigers (1–0) – Game summary

Quarter	1	2	3	4	Total
No. 1 Bison	17	28	7	7	59
Tigers	0	0	0	3	3

at Nissan Stadium • Nashville, TN

- Date: Saturday September 6, 2025
- Game time: 1:30 PM CDT
- Game weather: Cloudy • Temperature: 67 °F (19 °C) • Wind: N 2 mph
- Game attendance: 8,569
- Referee: Chris Brison
- TV announcers (ESPN+): Dan Laing (play-by-play) and Darren Arbet (analyst)

Game information

First quarter

- (9:31) NDSU – Barika Kpeenu 10-yard run, Eli Ozick kick (Drive: 9 plays, 71 yards, 5:24; North Dakota State 7–0)
- (7:08) NDSU – Barika Kpeenu 4-yard run, Eli Ozick kick (Drive: 4 plays, 20 yards, 1:55; North Dakota State 14–0)
- (1:21) NDSU – Eli Ozick 22-yard field goal (Drive: 9 plays, 38 yards, 3:39; North Dakota State 21–0)

Second quarter

- (13:08) NDSU – Barika Kpeenu 6-yard run, Eli Ozick kick (Drive: 5 plays, 33 yards, 2:04; North Dakota State 24–0)
- (10:04) NDSU – DJ Scott 5-yard run, Eli Ozick kick (Drive: 2 plays, 46 yards, 0:50; North Dakota State 31–0)
- (9:03) NDSU – Donovan Woolen 34-yard interception, Eli Ozick kick (North Dakota State 38–0)
- (1:21) NDSU – RaJa Nelson 3-yard pass from Cole Payton, Eli Ozick kick (Drive: 8 plays, 67 yards, 5:32; North Dakota State 45–0)

Third quarter

- (7:11) NDSU – Mekhi Collins 68-yard pass from Nathan Hayes, Eli Ozick kick (Drive: 5 plays, 82 yards, 2:56; North Dakota State 52–0)

Fourth quarter

- (8:27) NDSU – Myles Mitchell 2-yard run, Drew Klein kick (Drive: 5 plays, 49 yards, 2:45; North Dakota State 59–0)
- (4:05) TNST – Freddy Perez 45-yard field goal (Drive: 7 plays, 48 yards, 4:22; North Dakota State 59–3)

Statistics	NDSU	TNST
First downs	24	4
Total yards	433	131
Rushing yards	191	70
Passing yards	242	61
Passing: Comp–Att–Int	16–23–1	8–18–1
Time of possession	33:37	26:23

Team	Category	Player	Statistics
North Dakota State	Passing	Cole Payton	13/16, 166 yards, TD
North Dakota State	Rushing	Barika Kpeenu	10 carries, 57 yards, 3 TD
North Dakota State	Receiving	Mekhi Collins	1 reception, 68 yards, TD
Tennessee State	Passing	Jonathan Palmer	5/13, 38 yards
Tennessee State	Rushing	Kendric Rhymes	12 carries, 43 yards
Tennessee State	Receiving	Tyson Edwards	1 reception, 16 yards

=== vs. Alabama A&M ===
Game Three – Alabama A&M Bulldogs (1–1) at Tennessee State Tigers (1–1) – Game summary

Quarter	1	2	3	4	Total
Bulldogs	3	10	10	0	23
Tigers	0	21	0	0	21

at Nissan Stadium • Nashville, TN

- Date: Saturday September 13, 2025
- Game time: 3:30 p.m. CDT
- Game weather: Sunny • Temperature: 87 °F (31 °C)
- Game attendance: 10,208
- Referee: Gabriel Tomlin
- TV announcers (ESPN+): Dan Laing (play-by-play) and Dean Cokinos (analyst)

Game information

First quarter

- (8:25) AAMU – Victor Barbosa 26-yard field goal (Drive: 9 plays, 62 yards, 3:23; Alabama A&M 3–0)

Second quarter

- (13:51) AAMU – Myles Parker 5-yard pass from Cornelious Brown, Victor Barbosa kick (Drive: 8 plays, 98 yards, 2:39; Alabama A&M 10–0)
- (10:07) TNST – Kendric Rhymes 5-yard run, Freddy Perez kick (Drive: 6 plays, 75 yards, 3:44; Alabama A&M 10–7)
- (4:29) TNST – Zack Simmons-Brown 27-yard run, Freddy Perez kick (Drive: 9 plays, 68 yards, 4:41; Tennessee State 14–10)
- (1:39) AAMU – Victor Barbosa 26-yard field goal (Drive: 10 plays, 67 yards, 2:50; Tennessee State 14–13)
- (0:11) TNST – Kendric Rhymes 22-yard pass from Byron McNair, Freddy Perez kick (Drive: 6 plays, 49 yards, 1:19; Tennessee State 21–13)

Third quarter

- (8:49) AAMU – Daveon Walker 30-yard pass from Cornelious Brown, Victor Barbosa kick (Drive: 8 plays, 84 yards, 2:45; Tennessee State 21–20)
- (0:51) AAMU – Victor Barbosa 45-yard field goal (Drive: 9 plays, 56 yards, 4:02; Alabama A&M 23–21)

Fourth quarter

No scoring plays

Statistics	AAMU	TNST
First downs	19	21
Total yards	422	336
Rushing yards	67	179
Passing yards	355	157
Passing: Comp–Att–Int	23–35–0	17–27–1
Time of possession	24:16	35:44

Team	Category	Player	Statistics
Alabama A&M	Passing	Cornelious Brown	21/33, 329 yards, 2 TD
Alabama A&M	Rushing	Maurice Edwards	10 carries, 38 yards
Alabama A&M	Receiving	Travaunta Abner	6 receptions, 104 yards
Tennessee State	Passing	Byron McNair	17/27, 157 yards, TD, INT
Tennessee State	Rushing	Kendric Rhymes	24 carries, 111 yards, TD
Tennessee State	Receiving	Kendric Rhymes	7 receptions, 64 yards, TD

=== vs. No. 13 Tennessee Tech (Sgt. York Trophy) ===
Game Four – No. 13 Tennessee Tech Golden Eagles (3–0) at Tennessee State Tigers (1–2) – Game summary

Quarter	1	2	3	4	Total
No. 13 Golden Eagles	7	14	14	0	35
Tigers	0	0	3	5	8

at Nissan Stadium • Nashville, TN

- Date: Saturday September 27, 2025
- Game time: 3:30 p.m. CDT
- TV announcers (ESPN+): Dan Lang (play-by-play) and Dean Cokinos (analyst)

Game information

First quarter
Second quarter
Third quarter
Fourth quarter

Statistics	TNTC	TNST
First downs		
Total yards		
Rushing yards		
Passing yards		
Passing: Comp–Att–Int		
Time of possession		

Team	Category	Player	Statistics
Tennessee Tech	Passing		
Tennessee Tech	Rushing		
Tennessee Tech	Receiving		
Tennessee State	Passing		
Tennessee State	Rushing		
Tennessee State	Receiving		

=== at Eastern Illinois ===
Game Five – Tennessee State Tigers (1–4) at Eastern Illinois Panthers (2–2) – Game summary

Quarter	1	2	3	4	Total
Tigers	0	0	0	7	7
Panthers	7	10	7	7	31

at O'Brien Field • Charleston, IL

- Date: Saturday October 4, 2025
- Game time: 2:00 p.m. CDT
- TV announcers (ESPN+): Mike Bradd (play-by-play), Dave Kidwell (analyst) and Kaylee Unruh (sideline)

Game information

First quarter
Second quarter
Third quarter
Fourth quarter

Statistics	TNST	EIU
First downs		
Total yards		
Rushing yards		
Passing yards		
Passing: Comp–Att–Int		
Time of possession		

Team	Category	Player	Statistics
Tennessee State	Passing		
Tennessee State	Rushing		
Tennessee State	Receiving		
Eastern Illinois	Passing		
Eastern Illinois	Rushing		
Eastern Illinois	Receiving		

=== at Southeast Missouri State ===
Game Six – Tennessee State Tigers (1–5) at Southeast Missouri State Redhawks (1–4) – Game summary

Quarter	1	2	3	4	Total
Tigers	0	3	3	6	12
Redhawks	14	7	0	7	28

at Houck Stadium • Cape Girardeau, MO

- Date: Saturday October 11, 2025
- Game time: 3:00 p.m. CDT
- TV announcers (ESPN+): TBA

Game information

First quarter
Second quarter
Third quarter
Fourth quarter

Statistics	TNST	SEMO
First downs		
Total yards		
Rushing yards		
Passing yards		
Passing: Comp–Att–Int		
Time of possession		

Team	Category	Player	Statistics
Tennessee State	Passing		
Tennessee State	Rushing		
Tennessee State	Receiving		
Southeast Missouri State	Passing		
Southeast Missouri State	Rushing		
Southeast Missouri State	Receiving		

=== vs. Howard ===
Game Seven – Howard Bison (3–3) at Tennessee State Tigers (1–5) – Game summary

Quarter	1	2	3	4	Total
Bison	0	7	0	0	7
Tigers	7	7	7	3	24

at Hale Stadium • Nashville, TN

- Date: Saturday October 18, 2025
- Game time: 4:30 p.m. CDT
- Game weather: Sunny • Temperature: 82 °F (28 °C) • Wind: SW at 14 miles per hour (23 km/h)
- Game attendance: 14,056
- Referee: Matt Jones
- TV announcers (ESPN+): Dan Laing (play-by-play) and Dean Cokinos (analyst)

Game information

First quarter

- (10:59) TNST – Snap Reed 10-yard pass from Byron McNair, Freddy Perez kick (Drive: 6 plays, 79 yards, 3:54; Tennessee State 7–0)

Second quarter

- (7:01) HOW – Anthony Reagan Jr. 2-yard run, Matt Conord kick (Drive: 9 plays, 32 yards, 5:16; Tied 7–7)
- (0:24) TNST – Connor Ruth 6-yard pass from Byron McNair, Freddy Perez kick (Drive: 5 plays, 32 yards, 1:27; Tennessee State 14–7)

Third quarter

- (1:28) TNST – DeVaughn Slaughter 8-yard pass from Byron McNair, Freddy Perez kick (Drive: 6 plays, 51 yards, 3:34; Tennessee State 21–7)

Fourth quarter

- (3:17) TNST – Freddy Perez 34-yard field goal (Drive: 4 plays, -1 yards, 1:02; Tennessee State 24–7)

Statistics	HOW	TNST
First downs	10	7
Total yards	183	262
Rushing yards	67	88
Passing yards	116	174
Passing: Comp–Att–Int	14–27–2	18–22–0
Time of possession	31:37	28:23

Team	Category	Player	Statistics
Howard	Passing	Tyriq Starks	14/27, 116 yards, 2 INT
Howard	Rushing	Anthony Reagan Jr.	12 carries, 44 yards, TD
Howard	Receiving	CJ Neely	4 receptions, 56 yards
Tennessee State	Passing	Byron McNair	18/22, 174 yards, 3 TD
Tennessee State	Rushing	Byron McNair	6 carries, 47 yards
Tennessee State	Receiving	Kendric Rhymes	2 receptions, 46 yards

=== vs. Western Illinois ===
Game Eight – Western Illinois Leathernecks (1–7) at Tennessee State Tigers (2–5) – Game summary

Quarter	1	2	3	4	Total
Leathernecks	0	0	0	0	0
Tigers	0	0	0	0	0

at Nissan Stadium • Nashville, TN

- Date: Saturday October 25, 2025
- Game time: 1:30 p.m. CDT
- TV announcers (ESPN+): TBA

Game information

First quarter
Second quarter
Third quarter
Fourth quarter

Statistics	WIU	TNST
First downs		
Total yards		
Rushing yards		
Passing yards		
Passing: Comp–Att–Int		
Time of possession		

Team	Category	Player	Statistics
Western Illinois	Passing		
Western Illinois	Rushing		
Western Illinois	Receiving		
Tennessee State	Passing		
Tennessee State	Rushing		
Tennessee State	Receiving		

=== vs. Lindenwood ===
Game Nine – Lindenwood Lions (3–5) at Tennessee State Tigers (2–6) – Game summary

Quarter	1	2	3	4	Total
Lions	0	0	0	0	0
Tigers	0	0	0	0	0

at Nissan Stadium • Nashville, TN

- Date: Saturday November 1, 2025
- Game time: 3:30 p.m. CDT
- TV announcers (ESPN+): TBA

Game information

First quarter
Second quarter
Third quarter
Fourth quarter

Statistics	LIN	TNST
First downs		
Total yards		
Rushing yards		
Passing yards		
Passing: Comp–Att–Int		
Time of possession		

Team	Category	Player	Statistics
Lindenwood	Passing		
Lindenwood	Rushing		
Lindenwood	Receiving		
Tennessee State	Passing		
Tennessee State	Rushing		
Tennessee State	Receiving		

=== at UT Martin (Sgt. York Trophy) ===
Game Ten – Tennessee State Tigers (2–7) at UT Martin Skyhawks (4–5) – Game summary

Quarter	1	2	3	4	Total
Tigers	0	0	0	0	0
Skyhawks	0	0	0	0	0

at Graham Stadium • Martin, TN

- Date: Saturday November 8, 2025
- Game time: 1:00 p.m. CDT
- TV announcers (ESPN+): TBA

Game information

First quarter
Second quarter
Third quarter
Fourth quarter

Statistics	TNST	UTM
First downs		
Total yards		
Rushing yards		
Passing yards		
Passing: Comp–Att–Int		
Time of possession		

Team	Category	Player	Statistics
Tennessee State	Passing		
Tennessee State	Rushing		
Tennessee State	Receiving		
UT Martin	Passing		
UT Martin	Rushing		
UT Martin	Receiving		

=== vs. Gardner–Webb ===
Game Eleven – Gardner–Webb Runnin' Bulldogs (0–0) at Tennessee State Tigers (0–0) – Game summary

Quarter	1	2	3	4	Total
Runnin' Bulldogs	0	0	0	0	0
Tigers	0	0	0	0	0

at Nissan Stadium • Nashville, TN

- Date: Saturday November 15, 2025
- Game time: 1:30 p.m. CDT
- TV announcers (ESPN+): TBA

Game information

First quarter
Second quarter
Third quarter
Fourth quarter

Statistics	GWU	TNST
First downs		
Total yards		
Rushing yards		
Passing yards		
Passing: Comp–Att–Int		
Time of possession		

Team	Category	Player	Statistics
Gardner–Webb	Passing		
Gardner–Webb	Rushing		
Gardner–Webb	Receiving		
Tennessee State	Passing		
Tennessee State	Rushing		
Tennessee State	Receiving		

=== at Charleston Southern ===
Game Twelve – Tennessee State Tigers (0–0) at Charleston Southern Buccaneers (0–0) – Game summary

Quarter	1	2	3	4	Total
Tigers	0	0	0	0	0
Buccaneers	0	0	0	0	0

at Buccaneer Field • North Charleston, SC

- Date: Saturday November 22, 2025
- Game time: 1:00 p.m. CDT
- TV announcers (ESPN+): TBA

Game information

First quarter
Second quarter
Third quarter
Fourth quarter

Statistics	TNST	CSU
First downs		
Total yards		
Rushing yards		
Passing yards		
Passing: Comp–Att–Int		
Time of possession		

Team	Category	Player	Statistics
Tennessee State	Passing		
Tennessee State	Rushing		
Tennessee State	Receiving		
Charleston Southern	Passing		
Charleston Southern	Rushing		
Charleston Southern	Receiving		
