= 2025 Gardner–Webb Runnin' Bulldogs football team =

American college football season

2025 Gardner–Webb Runnin' Bulldogs football
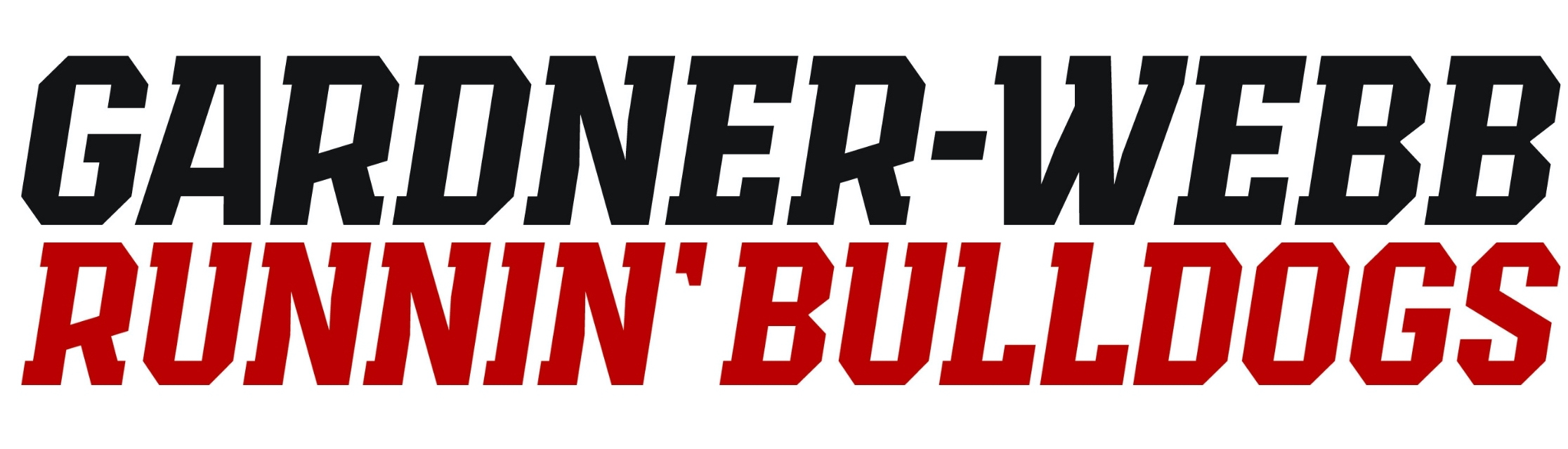
- Conference: OVC–Big South football
- Record: 7–5 (5–3 OVC–Big South)
- Head coach: Cris Reisert (2nd season)
- Offensive coordinator: Tyler Johns (2nd season)
- Defensive coordinator: Tim Cooper (2nd season)
- Home stadium: Ernest W. Spangler Stadium

2025 OVC–Big South football standings
	Conf.			Overall
Team	W		L	W		L
No. 16 Tennessee Tech $^	8	–	0	11	–	2
UT Martin	6	–	2	6	–	6
Gardner–Webb	5	–	3	7	–	5
Lindenwood	5	–	3	6	–	6
Charleston Southern	4	–	4	5	–	7
Southeast Missouri State	3	–	5	4	–	8
Western Illinois	3	–	5	4	–	8
Eastern Illinois	2	–	6	3	–	8
Tennessee State	0	–	8	2	–	10
$ – Conference champion; ^ – FCS playoff participant; Rankings from STATS Poll

The 2025 Gardner–Webb Runnin' Bulldogs football team represented Gardner–Webb University as a member of the OVC–Big South Football Association during the 2025 NCAA Division I FCS football season. The team were led by second-year head coach Cris Reisert and played their home games at the Ernest W. Spangler Stadium located in Boiling Springs, North Carolina.

On December 15, it was announced that Reisert would be stepping down as the Runnin' Bulldogs head coach. Four days later, December 19, Reisert was announced as the offensive coordinator and quarterbacks coach at Toledo. On December 23, UT Permian Basin head coach Kris McCullough was announced as the Runnin' Bulldogs' new head coach.

== Offseason ==
=== Preseason poll ===
The Big South-OVC Conference released their preseason poll on July 16, 2025. The Runnin' Bulldogs were picked to finish sixth in the conference.

=== Transfers ===
==== Outgoing ====
Player	Position	Destination
Adam Hickerson	OL	Arkansas State
Tyler Riddell	QB	Duquesne
Trevor Moffitt	LB	East Tennessee State
Camden Overton	TE	Georgia State
Anthony Enechukwu	S	Jackson State
David Okoi	WR	Morgan State
Phinnell Marshall	DL	North Carolina A&T
Oscar Colon	OL	Presbyterian
Pius Njenge	DL	Tarleton State
Jonathan Palmer	QB	Tennessee State
Jesse Igwe	OL	Tennessee State
Diondre Glover	DB	UConn
Marquis Black	DL	UConn
Parker Prevette	OL	Unknown
Jeff Bowens	DB	Unknown

==== Incoming ====
Player	Position	Previous school
Dylan Manders	LB	Anderson (SC)
Blake Bradford	DE	Appalachian State
Cahari Haynes	LB	Appalachian State
Jesse Igwe	OL	Charleston (WV)
Jack Reynolds	WR	Charlotte
Jalen Harris	WR	Coastal Carolina
Brady Braun	P	Coffeyville
Sabin Mclaughlin	S/LB	Davidson
Andre Crawley	DL	Emory and Henry
Jose Gonzalez	OL	Fort Valley State
Charlie Viorel	K	Fullerton
Jabre Bevineau	WR	Fullerton
Daejuan Thompson	LB	Garden City
Jaden Watkins	DB	Garden City
Chris Lofton	WR	James Madison
Gatlin Hancock	TE	Kennesaw State
Quintavious Billingsley	DB	Kennesaw State
Ryan Demonbreun	TE	Kentucky Wesleyan
Kam Wyatt	S	Lackawanna
Markel Fortenberry	WR	Liberty
Nate Hampton	QB	Liberty
Cole Pennington	QB	Marshall
Henry Kofowo	OL	Murray State
Adam Hickerson	OL	Sewanee
Jackson Dorr	P	Stony Brook
Trey Weems	DL	Thomas More
Jordan Jackson	DB	West Virginia
Elvin Fofanah	TE	Western Kentucky

=== Recruiting class ===
Name	Position	Height	Weight	Hometown	High School
Zalen Watkins	DL	6-3	260	Forest City, NC	East Rutherford
Sean Brady	WR	5-9	165	Charlotte, NC	Hough
Finley Polk	QB	6-3	185	Rock Hill, SC	Northwestern
David Torres	OL	6-2	285	Marietta, GA	Kell
Carter Isaacs	DB	6-0	185	Hamilton, OH	Hamilton
Ontario Hewitt Jr.	DE	6-3	220	Mansfield, TX	Mansfield Timberview
Paul Williams	DL	6-2	245	Milton, GA	Milton
Jacob Mull	LS	6-3	245	Connelly Springs, NC	Jimmy C. Draughn
Brooks Kerwin	OL	6-3	280	Lexington, KY	Lexington Christian Academy
James Newton	WR	5-11	175	Burlington, NC	Western Alamance
Abraham Brown	DB	5-11	160	Sarasota, FL	Booker

== Schedule ==
Date	Time	Opponent	Site	TV	Result	Attendance
August 30	6:00 p.m.	at No. 18 Western Carolina*	E.J. Whitmire Stadium; Cullowhee, NC	ESPN+	W 52–45	11,889
September 6	3:30 p.m.	at Georgia Tech*	Bobby Dodd Stadium; Atlanta, GA	ACCNX/ESPN+	L 12–59	37,775
September 13	7:00 p.m.	The Citadel*	Ernest W. Spangler Stadium; Boiling Springs, NC	ESPN+	W 23–13	4,522
September 20	3:30 p.m.	at Ohio*	Peden Stadium; Athens, OH	ESPN+	L 35–52	22,312
October 4	1:30 p.m.	Charleston Southern	Ernest W. Spangler Stadium; Boiling Springs, NC	ESPN+	W 30–27	3,618
October 11	3:00 p.m.	at Eastern Illinois	O'Brien Field; Charleston, IL	ESPN+	W 21–10	6,085
October 18	1:30 p.m.	UT Martin	Ernest W. Spangler Stadium; Boiling Springs, NC	ESPN+	L 7–37	4,602
October 25	3:00 p.m.	at Lindenwood	Harlen C. Hunter Stadium; St. Charles, MO	ESPN+	W 48–20	4,502
November 1	1:00 p.m.	at No. 9 Tennessee Tech	Tucker Stadium; Cookeville, TN	ESPN+	L 21–27	7,517
November 8	1:30 p.m.	Southeast Missouri State	Ernest W. Spangler Stadium; Boiling Springs, NC	ESPN+	W 27–24	3,246
November 15	1:30 p.m.	at Tennessee State	Nissan Stadium; Nashville, TN	ESPN+	W 30–14	1,667
November 22	1:30 p.m.	Western Illinois	Ernest W. Spangler Stadium; Boiling Springs, NC	ESPN+	L 24–29	2,769
*Non-conference game; Rankings from STATS Poll released prior to the game; All times are in Eastern time

== Game summaries ==
=== at Western Carolina ===
Game One – Gardner–Webb Runnin' Bulldogs (0–0) at No. 18 Western Carolina Catamounts (0–0) – Game summary

Quarter	1	2	3	4	Total
Runnin' Bulldogs	7	14	7	24	52
No. 18 Catamounts	21	14	7	3	45

at E. J. Whitmire Stadium • Cullowhee, NC

- Date: Saturday August 30, 2025
- Game time: 6:00 p.m. EDT
- Game attendance: 11,889
- Referee: Jeff Page
- TV announcers (ESPN+): Justin Biegel (play-by-play) and Jack Delongchamps (analyst)

Game information

First quarter

- GWEB – Quasean Holmes 65-yard run (Charlie Viorel kick), 14:02. Runnin' Bulldogs 7–0. Drive: 2 plays, 65 yards, 0:14.
- WCU – Patrick Boyd Jr. 28-yard run (Christian Lowery kick), 12:09. Tied 7–7. Drive: 1 play, 28 yards, 0:06.
- WCU – Camury Reid 3-yard run (Christian Lowery kick), 8:18. Catamounts 14–7. Drive: 9 plays, 64 yards, 2:30.
- WCU – James Tyre 5-yard pass from Bennett Judy (Christian Lowery kick), 4:30. Catamounts 21–7. Drive: 3 plays, 4 yards, 1:06.

Second quarter

- WCU – Trey Walker 25-yard pass from Bennett Judy (Christian Lowery kick), 13:28. Catamounts 28–7. Drive: 12 plays, 80 yards, 4:16.
- WCU – Malik Knight 69-yard pass from Isaac Lee (Christian Lowery kick), 8:24. Catamounts 35–7. Drive: 2 plays, 80 yards, 0:38.
- GWEB – Anthony Lowe 18-yard pass from Nate Hampton (Charlie Viorel kick), 5:23. Catamounts 35–14. Drive: 9 plays, 75 yards, 3:01.
- GWEB – Nate Hampton 1-yard run (Charlie Viorel kick), 1:08. Catamounts 35–21. Drive: 7 plays, 65 yards, 2:16.

Third quarter

- GWEB – Anthony Lowe 36-yard pass from Nate Hampton (Charlie Viorel kick), 12:20. Catamounts 35–28. Drive: 6 plays, 75 yards, 2:35.
- WCU – Camury Reid 1-yard run (Christian Lowery kick), 1:26. Catamounts 42–28. Drive: 5 plays, 83 yards, 2:09.

Fourth quarter

- GWEB – Nate Hampton 16-yard run (Charlie Viorel kick), 13:51. Catamounts 42–35. Drive: 8 plays, 75 yards, 2:33.
- GWEB – Nate Hampton 7-yard run (Charlie Viorel kick), 10:16. Tied 42–42. Drive: 4 plays, 69 yards, 1:39.
- GWEB – Charlie Viorel 22-yard field goal, 2:36. Runnin' Bulldogs 45–42. Drive: 7 plays, 24 yards, 3:27.
- GWEB – Nate Hampton 26-yard run (Charlie Viorel kick), 1:48. Runnin' Bulldogs 52–42. Drive: 1 play, 26 yards, 0:08.
- WCU – Christian Lowery 29-yard field goal, 0:42. Runnin' Buldogs 52–45. Drive: 8 plays, 65 yards, 1:00.

Statistics	GWEB	WCU
First downs	25	21
Total yards	627	454
Rushes–yards	57–335	42–221
Passing yards	292	233
Passing: Comp–Att–Int	13–33–1	18–36–1
Turnovers	2	3
Time of possession	35:38	24:22

Team	Category	Player	Statistics
Gardner–Webb	Passing	Nate Hampton	12/30, 263 yards, 2 TD
Gardner–Webb	Rushing	Nate Hampton	28 carries, 132 yards, 4 TD
Gardner–Webb	Receiving	Chris Lofton	3 receptions, 102 yards
Western Carolina	Passing	Bennett Judy	15/27, 151 yards, 2 TD, INT
Western Carolina	Rushing	Patrick Boyd Jr.	15 carries, 142 yards, TD
Western Carolina	Receiving	Malik Knight	1 reception, 69 yards, TD

=== at Georgia Tech (FBS) ===
Game Two – Gardner–Webb Runnin' Bulldogs (1–0) at Georgia Tech Yellow Jackets (FBS) (1–0) – Game summary

Quarter	1	2	3	4	Total
Runnin' Bulldogs	6	0	0	6	12
Yellow Jackets (FBS)	7	21	14	17	59

at Bobby Dodd Stadium • Atlanta, Georgia

- Date: September 6
- Game time: 3:30 p.m.
- Game weather: Cloudy • Temperature: 86 °F (30 °C) • Wind: SW 11 mph
- Game attendance: 37,775
- Referee: Art Brown
- TV announcers (ACCNX/ESPN+): Justin Kutcher (play-by-play) and Forrest Conoly (analyst)

Game information

First quarter

- GWEB – Anthony Lowe 1-yard pass from Nate Hampton (Charlie Viorel kick failed), 10:17. Runnin' Bulldogs 6–0. Drive: 6 plays, 42 yards, 2:33.
- GT – Isiah Canion 11-yard pass from Aaron Philo (Aidan Birr kick), 3:07. Yellow Jackets 7–6. Drive: 4 plays, 58 yards, 1:20.

Second quarter

- GT – Malachi Hosley 55-yard run (Aidan Birr kick), 13:32. Yellow Jackets 14–6. Drive: 2 plays, 61 yards, 0:29.
- GT – Jamal Haynes 47-yard run (Aidan Birr kick), 9:35. Yellow Jackets 21–6. Drive: 3 plays, 94 yards, 1:07.
- GT – Jamal Haynes 1-yard run (Aidan Birr kick), 3:59. Yellow Jackets 28–6. Drive: 7 plays, 36 yards, 2:49.

Third quarter

- GT – Malachi Hosley 5-yard run (Aidan Birr kick), 7:12. Yellow Jackets 35–6. Drive: 5 plays, 25 yards, 2:19.
- GT – Ahmari Harvey 65-yard blocked field goal return (Aidan Birr kick), 0:36. Yellow Jackets 42–6.

Fourth quarter

- GWEB – Caleb Borders 14-yard pass from Cole Pennington (Charlie Viorel kick BLOCKED), 13:39. Yellow Jackets 42–12. Drive: 7 plays, 75 yards, 1:57.
- GT – Aidan Birr 23-yard field goal, 10:19. Yellow Jackets 45–12. Drive: 8 plays, 57 yards, 3:17.
- GT – J.P. Powell 1-yard run (Aidan Birr kick), 6:21. Yellow Jackets 52–12. Drive: 3 plays, 86 yards, 1:36.
- GT – Dean Patterson 84-yard pass from Graham Knowles (Aidan Birr kick), 3:03. Yellow Jackets 59–12. Drive: 1 play, 84 yards, 0:12.

Statistics	GWEB	GT
First downs	20	21
Plays–yards	77–326	57–680
Rushes–yards	47–117	28–223
Passing yards	209	457
Passing: comp–att–int	20–30–0	22–29–1
Turnovers	1	2
Time of possession	37:23	22:40

Team	Category	Player	Statistics
Gardner–Webb	Passing	Cole Pennington	14/21, 164 yards, TD
Gardner–Webb	Rushing	Quasean Holmes	14 carries, 48 yards
Gardner–Webb	Receiving	Anthony Lowe	8 receptions, 87 yards, TD
Georgia Tech	Passing	Aaron Philo	21/28, 373 yards, TD, INT
Georgia Tech	Rushing	Malachi Hosley	9 carries, 100 yards, 2 TD
Georgia Tech	Receiving	Dean Patterson	3 receptions, 87 yards, TD

=== vs. The Citadel ===
Game Three – The Citadel Bulldogs (1–1) at Gardner–Webb Runnin' Bulldogs (1–1) – Game summary

Quarter	1	2	3	4	Total
Bulldogs	0	0	7	6	13
Runnin' Bulldogs	10	7	3	3	23

at Ernest W. Spangler Stadium • Boiling Springs, NC

- Date: Saturday September 13, 2025
- Game time: 7:00 p.m. EDT
- Game weather: Sunny
- Game attendance: 4,522
- Referee: John Kellermeier
- TV announcers (ESPN+): Ford Martin (play-by-play) and Bryson Byrnes (analyst)

Game information

First quarter

- (7:14) GWU – Charles Viorel 26-yard field goal (Drive: 12 plays, 42 yards, 5:34; Gardner–Webb 3–0)
- (0:47) GWU – Caleb Borders 11-yard pass from Nate Hampton, Charles Viorel kick (Drive: 8 plays, 79 yards, 4:08; Gardner–Webb 10–0)

Second quarter

- (6:15) GWU – Chris Lofton 67-yard pass from Nate Hampton, Charles Viorel kick (Drive: 2 plays, 69 yards, 0:43; Gardner–Webb 17–0)

Third quarter

- (11:02) GWU – Charles Viorel 33-yard field goal (Drive: 4 plays, -1 yards, 0:39; Gardner–Webb 20–0)
- (1:39) CIT – Sebastien Boyle 2-yard run, Ben Barnes kick (Drive: 8 plays, 72 yards, 4:00; Gardner–Webb 20–7)

Fourth quarter

- (10:57) GWU – Charles Viorel 27-yard field goal (Drive: 12 plays, 58 yards, 5:35; Gardner–Webb 23–7)
- (0:02) CIT – Braylon Knauth 1-yard pass from Cobey Thompkins (Drive: 8 plays, 99 yards, 1:31; Gardner–Webb 23–13)

Statistics	CIT	GWEB
First downs	14	16
Total yards	307	334
Rushing yards	210	118
Passing yards	97	216
Passing: Comp–Att–Int	6–11–0	15–25–0
Time of possession	30:50	28:23

Team	Category	Player	Statistics
The Citadel	Passing	Cobey Thompkins	6/10, 97 yards, TD
The Citadel	Rushing	Garrison Johnson Sr.	13 carries, 73 yards
The Citadel	Receiving	Braylon Knauth	3 receptions, 44 yards, TD
Gardner–Webb	Passing	Nate Hampton	13/22, 206 yards, 2 TD
Gardner–Webb	Rushing	Quasean Holmes	17 carries, 90 yards
Gardner–Webb	Receiving	Chris Lofton	3 receptions, 90 yards, TD

=== at Ohio (FBS) ===
Game Four – Gardner–Webb Runnin' Bulldogs (2–1) at Ohio Bobcats (FBS) (1–2) – Game summary

Quarter	1	2	3	4	Total
Runnin' Bulldogs	14	7	0	14	35
Bobcats (FBS)	3	28	7	14	52

at Peden Stadium • Athens, OH

- Date: Saturday September 20, 2025
- Game time: 3:30 p.m. EDT
- Game weather: sunny, Temperature:87 °F (31 °C), Wind: E 4mph
- Game attendance: 22,312
- Referee: Matt Packowski (MAC)
- TV announcers (ESPN+): Kelsie Kasper (play-by-play) and Ryan Cavanaugh (analyst)

Game information

First quarter

- (06:31) GWEB – Quasean Holmes 8-yard run (Charles Viorel kick), 9 plays, 37 yards, 04:32; GWEB 7–0
- (03:24) OHIO – Brack Peacock 31-yard field goal, 7 plays, 26 yards, 02:57; GWEB 7–3
- (01:20) GWEB – Carson Gresock 48-yard run (Charles Viorel kick), 5 plays, 75 yards, 02:04; GWEB 14–3

Second quarter

- (12:59) OHIO – Duncan Brune 2-yard run (kick failed), 8 plays, 58 yards, 03:21; GWEB 14–9
- (12:59) OHIO – Sieh Bangura 8-yard run (Mason Williams pass from Parker Navarro), 7 plays, 69 yards, 02:53; OHIO 17–14
- (06:30) GWEB – Quasean Holmes 68-yard pass from Nate Hampton (Charles Viorel kick), 3 plays, 75 yards, 01:25; GWEB 21–17
- (05:01) OHIO – Chase Hendricks 43-yard pass from Parker Navarro (Brack Peacock kick), 5 plays, 75 yards, 1:29; OHIO 24–21
- (00:28) OHIO – Sieh Bangura 1-yard run (Brack Peacock kick), 8 plays, 80 yards, 01:21; OHIO 31–21

Third quarter

- (01:54) OHIO – Duncan Brune 1-yard run (Brack Peacock kick), 5 plays, 75 yards, 02:18; OHIO 38–21

Fourth quarter

- (14:06) GWEB – Chris Lofton 42-yard pass from Nate Hampton (Charles Viorel kick), 10 plays, 75 yards, 02:48; OHIO 38–28
- (11:25) OHIO – Sieh Bangura 32-yard run (Brack Peacock kick), 5 plays, 75 yards, 02:41; OHIO 45–28
- (07:48) GWEB – Quasean Holmes 5-yard run (Charles Viorel kick), 7 plays, 75 yards, 03:37; OHIO 45–35
- (04:00) OHIO – Duncan Brune 1-yard run (Brack Peacock kick), 6 plays, 45 yards, 03:4; OHIO 52–35

Statistics	GWEB	OHIO
First downs	16	33
Plays–yards	61–480	75–608
Rushes–yards	31–191	48–318
Passing yards	289	290
Passing: Comp–Att–Int	19–30–1	18–27–0
Turnovers	1	0
Time of possession	26:01	33:59

Team	Category	Player	Statistics
Gardner–Webb	Passing	Nate Hampton	19/28, 289 yards, 2 TD, INT
Gardner–Webb	Rushing	Carson Gresock	7 carries, 70 yards, TD
Gardner–Webb	Receiving	Anthony Lowe	8 receptions, 72 yards
Ohio	Passing	Parker Navarro	19/27, 290 yards, TD
Ohio	Rushing	Sieh Bangura	18 carries, 123 yards, 3 TD
Ohio	Receiving	Chase Hendricks	8 receptions, 144 yards, TD

=== vs. Charleston Southern ===
Game Five – Charleston Southern Buccaneers (1–4) at Gardner–Webb Runnin' Bulldogs (2–2) – Game summary

Quarter	1	2	3	4	Total
Buccaneers	0	7	0	20	27
Runnin' Bulldogs	3	7	0	20	30

at Ernest W. Spangler Stadium • Boiling Springs, NC

- Date: Saturday October 4, 2025
- Game time: 1:30 p.m. EDT
- TV announcers (ESPN+): Ford Martin (play-by-play) and Bryson Byrnes (analyst)

Game information

First quarter
Second quarter
Third quarter
Fourth quarter

Statistics	CHSO	GWEB
First downs		
Total yards		
Rushing yards		
Passing yards		
Passing: Comp–Att–Int		
Time of possession		

Team	Category	Player	Statistics
Charleston Southern	Passing		
Charleston Southern	Rushing		
Charleston Southern	Receiving		
Gardner–Webb	Passing		
Gardner–Webb	Rushing		
Gardner–Webb	Receiving		

=== at Eastern Illinois ===
Game Six – Gardner–Webb Runnin' Bulldogs (3–2) at Eastern Illinois Panthers (3–2) – Game summary

Quarter	1	2	3	4	Total
Runnin' Bulldogs	7	14	0	0	21
Panthers	0	3	7	0	10

at O'Brien Field • Charleston, IL

- Date: Saturday October 11, 2025
- Game time: 3:00 p.m. EDT
- TV announcers (ESPN+): TBA

Game information

First quarter
Second quarter
Third quarter
Fourth quarter

Statistics	GWEB	EIU
First downs		
Total yards		
Rushing yards		
Passing yards		
Passing: Comp–Att–Int		
Time of possession		

Team	Category	Player	Statistics
Gardner–Webb	Passing		
Gardner–Webb	Rushing		
Gardner–Webb	Receiving		
Eastern Illinois	Passing		
Eastern Illinois	Rushing		
Eastern Illinois	Receiving		

=== vs. UT Martin ===
Game Seven – UT Martin Skyhawks (2–5) at Gardner–Webb Runnin' Bulldogs (4–2) – Game summary

Quarter	1	2	3	4	Total
Skyhawks	0	0	0	0	0
Runnin' Bulldogs	0	0	0	0	0

at Ernest W. Spangler Stadium • Boiling Springs, NC

- Date: Saturday October 18, 2025
- Game time: 1:30 p.m. EDT
- TV announcers (ESPN+): TBA

Game information

First quarter
Second quarter
Third quarter
Fourth quarter

Statistics	UTM	GWEB
First downs		
Total yards		
Rushing yards		
Passing yards		
Passing: Comp–Att–Int		
Time of possession		

Team	Category	Player	Statistics
UT Martin	Passing		
UT Martin	Rushing		
UT Martin	Receiving		
Gardner–Webb	Passing		
Gardner–Webb	Rushing		
Gardner–Webb	Receiving		

=== at Lindenwood ===
Game Eight – Gardner–Webb Runnin' Bulldogs (4–3) at Lindenwood Lions (3–4) – Game summary

Quarter	1	2	3	4	Total
Runnin' Bulldogs	0	0	0	0	0
Lions	0	0	0	0	0

at Harlen C. Hunter Stadium • St. Charles, MO

- Date: Saturday October 25, 2025
- Game time: 3:00 p.m. EDT
- TV announcers (ESPN+): TBA

Game information

First quarter
Second quarter
Third quarter
Fourth quarter

Statistics	GWEB	LIN
First downs		
Total yards		
Rushing yards		
Passing yards		
Passing: Comp–Att–Int		
Time of possession		

Team	Category	Player	Statistics
Gardner–Webb	Passing		
Gardner–Webb	Rushing		
Gardner–Webb	Receiving		
Lindenwood	Passing		
Lindenwood	Rushing		
Lindenwood	Receiving		

=== at No. 9 Tennessee Tech ===
Game Nine – Gardner–Webb Runnin' Bulldogs (5–3) at No. 9 Tennessee Tech Golden Eagles (8–0) – Game summary

Quarter	1	2	3	4	Total
Runnin' Bulldogs	0	0	0	0	0
No. 9 Golden Eagles	0	0	0	0	0

at Tucker Stadium • Cookeville, TN

- Date: Saturday November 1, 2025
- Game time: 1:00 p.m. EDT
- TV announcers (ESPN+): TBA

Game information

First quarter
Second quarter
Third quarter
Fourth quarter

Statistics	GWEB	TNTC
First downs		
Total yards		
Rushing yards		
Passing yards		
Passing: Comp–Att–Int		
Time of possession		

Team	Category	Player	Statistics
Gardner–Webb	Passing		
Gardner–Webb	Rushing		
Gardner–Webb	Receiving		
Tennessee Tech	Passing		
Tennessee Tech	Rushing		
Tennessee Tech	Receiving		

=== vs. Southeast Missouri State ===
Game Ten – Southeast Missouri State Redhawks (3–6) at Gardner–Webb Runnin' Bulldogs (5–4) – Game summary

Quarter	1	2	3	4	Total
Redhawks	0	0	0	0	0
Runnin' Bulldogs	0	0	0	0	0

at Ernest W. Spangler Stadium • Boiling Springs, NC

- Date: Saturday November 8, 2025
- Game time: 1:30 p.m. EDT
- TV announcers (ESPN+): TBA

Game information

First quarter
Second quarter
Third quarter
Fourth quarter

Statistics	SEMO	GWEB
First downs		
Total yards		
Rushing yards		
Passing yards		
Passing: Comp–Att–Int		
Time of possession		

Team	Category	Player	Statistics
Southeast Missouri State	Passing		
Southeast Missouri State	Rushing		
Southeast Missouri State	Receiving		
Gardner–Webb	Passing		
Gardner–Webb	Rushing		
Gardner–Webb	Receiving		

=== at Tennessee State ===
Game Eleven – Gardner–Webb Runnin' Bulldogs (0–0) at Tennessee State Tigers (0–0) – Game summary

Quarter	1	2	3	4	Total
Runnin' Bulldogs	0	0	0	0	0
Tigers	0	0	0	0	0

at Nissan Stadium • Nashville, TN

- Date: Saturday November 15, 2025
- Game time: 1:30 p.m. EDT
- TV announcers (ESPN+): TBA

Game information

First quarter
Second quarter
Third quarter
Fourth quarter

Statistics	GWEB	TNST
First downs		
Total yards		
Rushing yards		
Passing yards		
Passing: Comp–Att–Int		
Time of possession		

Team	Category	Player	Statistics
Gardner–Webb	Passing		
Gardner–Webb	Rushing		
Gardner–Webb	Receiving		
Tennessee State	Passing		
Tennessee State	Rushing		
Tennessee State	Receiving		

=== vs. Western Illinois ===
Game Twelve – Western Illinois Leathernecks (0–0) at Gardner–Webb Runnin' Bulldogs (0–0) – Game summary

Quarter	1	2	3	4	Total
Leathernecks	0	0	0	0	0
Runnin' Bulldogs	0	0	0	0	0

at Ernest W. Spangler Stadium • Boiling Springs, NC

- Date: Saturday November 22, 2025
- Game time: 1:30 p.m. EDT
- TV announcers (ESPN+): TBA

Game information

First quarter
Second quarter
Third quarter
Fourth quarter

Statistics	WIU	GWEB
First downs		
Total yards		
Rushing yards		
Passing yards		
Passing: Comp–Att–Int		
Time of possession		

Team	Category	Player	Statistics
Western Illinois	Passing		
Western Illinois	Rushing		
Western Illinois	Receiving		
Gardner–Webb	Passing		
Gardner–Webb	Rushing		
Gardner–Webb	Receiving		
