= 2025 Lindenwood Lions football team =

American college football season

2025 Lindenwood Lions football
- Conference: OVC–Big South Football Association
- Record: 6–6 (5–3 OVC–Big South)
- Head coach: Jed Stugart (8th season)
- Offensive coordinator: Dusty Hovorka (8th season)
- Defensive coordinator: Eric Inama (8th season)
- Home stadium: Harlen C. Hunter Stadium

2025 OVC–Big South football standings
	Conf.			Overall
Team	W		L	W		L
No. 16 Tennessee Tech $^	8	–	0	11	–	2
UT Martin	6	–	2	6	–	6
Gardner–Webb	5	–	3	7	–	5
Lindenwood	5	–	3	6	–	6
Charleston Southern	4	–	4	5	–	7
Southeast Missouri State	3	–	5	4	–	8
Western Illinois	3	–	5	4	–	8
Eastern Illinois	2	–	6	3	–	8
Tennessee State	0	–	8	2	–	10
$ – Conference champion; ^ – FCS playoff participant; Rankings from STATS Poll

The 2025 Lindenwood Lions football team represent Lindenwood University as a member of the OVC–Big South Football Association in the 2025 NCAA Division I FCS football season. The Lions are led by head coach Jed Stugart in his eighth season and play their home games at Harlen C. Hunter Stadium in St. Charles, Missouri. Due to their transition from NCAA Division II, Lindenwood is ineligible for the conference title and the FCS playoffs until 2026.

== Offseason ==
=== Preseason poll ===
The Big South-OVC Conference released their preseason poll on July 16, 2025. The Lions were picked to finish fourth in the conference.

=== Transfers ===
==== Outgoing ====
Player	Position	Destination
Jeff Caldwell	WR	Cincinnati
Taylen Blaylock	DB	Furman
Tre Bell	DB	Iowa State
Jaylan Wesley	DB	Northern Arizona
Jaydyn Johnson	DB	Sam Houston
Donnie Wingate	DE	Southern Illinois
Ken Meir	OL	Temple
Reece Thomas	WR	William Jewell
Tyler Kubat	QB	William Jewell
Ronnie Thomas Jr.	RB	William Jewell
Ethan Stuhlsatz	LB	Wyoming
Patrick Turner	P	Unknown
Anthony Hills	WR	Unknown

==== Incoming ====
Player	Position	Height	Weight	Hometown	Previous school
Joshua Robinson	OL	6-2	285	St. Louis, MO	Austin Peay
Eli Freeman	OL	6-4	291	Lebanon, TN	Ball State
Feki Finau	DL	6-2	300	Makawao, HI	Fort Lewis
Tomasi Finau	DL	6-1	220	Makawao, HI	Fort Lewis
Noel Vallejo	DB	5-11	170	Los Angeles, CA	Golden West
Ethan Beard	LB	6-5	210	Meridian, ID	Idaho
Caleb Jacobmeier	LB	6-2	220	Bellevue, NE	Iowa Western
Caelum Jones	LB	6-4	225	Cedar Rapids, IA	Iowa Western
Alex Dawkins	S	5-11	165	Columbus, MS	Itawamba
Zech Pratt	DB	6-2	170	New Houlka, MS	Itawamba
Jarard Mosely	S	6-2	193	Riviera Beach, FL	Kentucky
A.J. Vinatieri	P	6-1	190	Zionsville, IN	Louisville
Vaughn Johnson	TE	6-5	225	Mason, OH	Miami (OH)
Danny Zarco	OL	6-5	310	Chicago, IL	Miami (OH)
David Amaliri	LB	6-4	210	Winnipeg, MB	Minnesota
Nathan Lund	OL	5-11	328	O'Fallon, MO	Missouri
Ryan Boyd	WR	6-0	185	St. Louis, MO	Missouri State
Mason Jones	DB	6-2	200	Omaha, NE	Nebraska
Elijah Thomas	S	6-2	190	St. Louis, MO	New Mexico State
Trey Morrison	OL	6-2	340	Terry, MS	Pearl River
Jaymason Willingham	LB	6-1	220	Steilacoom, WA	Portland State
Cody Kamfonik	OL	6-2	315	San Diego, CA	San Diego Mesa
Jacques Wyatt III	WR	6-2	196	Clarksville, TN	Southeast Missouri State
DeVonta Owens	DB	6-2	180	Tulsa, OK	Temple
Zach Neilsen	LB	6-1	230	Brisbane	Tulsa
Aiden Knapke	DB	6-0	193	Aurora, CO	Washington State

=== Recruiting class ===
Name	Position	Height	Weight	Hometown	High School
Ke'Andre McClendon	DL	6-2	245	East St. Louis, IL	East St. Louis
Reece Satterwhite	DL	6-2	260	Owasso, OK	Owasso
LaRavious Woods	RB	5-9	195	East St. Louis, IL	East St. Louis
Carter Briddell	OL	6-3	285	Wentzville, MO	North Point
Connor Cook	OL	6-9	335	Omaha, NE	Omaha North
CJ Bennett	WR	5-7	175	East St. Louis, IL	East St. Louis
Hoyt Gregory Jr.	QB	6-3	215	Wentzville, MO	North Point
Aiden Grote	TE	6-5	245	Bowling Green, MO	Bowling Green
Carter Johnson	LB	6-4	210	Waukee, IA	Waukee
Luke Zook	DB	6-1	190	Yorkville, IL	Yorkville
Brogan Hartman	K	6-2	175	O'Fallon, IL	O'Fallon Township
Jacob O’Donnell	OL	6-5	305	Shawnee Mission, KS	Shawnee Mission Northwest
CJ Reese	WR	6-3	195	Highlands Ranch, CO	Mountain Vista
Eddie Becu	DL	6-0	260	Cedar Rapids, IA	Xavier
Tristan Ginn	DE	6-3	210	Henrico, VA	Godwin
Keenan Paschall	DL	6-2	248	Minneapolis, MN	Godwin
Evan Shaigineik	RB	6-2	248	Orange County, CA	Tesoro
Blake Ashby	LB	6-2	240	Eureka, MO	Eureka

== Schedule ==
Date	Time	Opponent	Site	TV	Result	Attendance
August 28	6:00 p.m.	at St. Thomas (MN)	O'Shaughnessy Stadium; Saint Paul, MN	Midco Sports Plus	L 13–35	3,565
September 6	2:30 p.m.	at Appalachian State*	Kidd Brewer Stadium; Boone, NC	ESPN+	L 13–20	34,921
September 13	3:00 p.m.	at Charleston Southern	Buccaneer Field; North Charleston, SC	ESPN+	W 35–28	3,831
September 20	6:00 p.m.	Stony Brook*	Harlen C. Hunter Stadium; St. Charles, MO	ESPN+	W 30–27	4,716
September 27	2:30 p.m.	at Miami (OH)*	Yager Stadium; Oxford, OH	ESPN+	L 0–38	10,504
October 4	1:00 p.m.	UT Martin	Harlen C. Hunter Stadium; St. Charles, MO	ESPN+	W 30–14	3,116
October 18	1:00 p.m.	No. 8 Tennessee Tech	Harlen C. Hunter Stadium; St. Charles, MO	ESPN+	L 28–52	2,737
October 25	2:00 p.m.	Gardner–Webb	Harlen C. Hunter Stadium; St. Charles, MO	ESPN+	L 20–48	4,502
November 1	3:30 p.m.	at Tennessee State	Nissan Stadium; Nashville, TN	ESPN+	W 35–13	1,006
November 8	1:00 p.m.	at Western Illinois	Hanson Field; Macomb, IL	ESPN+	L 21–24	2,004
November 15	2:00 p.m.	Eastern Illinois	Harlen C. Hunter Stadium; St. Charles, MO	ESPN+	W 42–12	4,968
November 22	1:00 p.m.	at Southeast Missouri State	Houck Stadium; Cape Girardeau, MO	ESPN+	W 30–13	3,463
*Non-conference game; Rankings from STATS Poll released prior to the game; All times are in Central time

== Game summaries ==
=== at St. Thomas (MN) ===
Game One – Lindenwood Lions (0–0) at St. Thomas Tommies (0–0) – Game summary

Quarter	1	2	3	4	Total
Lions	0	7	6	0	13
Tommies	0	7	14	14	35

at O'Shaughnessy Stadium • Saint Paul, MN

- Date: Thursday August 28, 2025
- Game time: 6:00 p.m.
- Game attendance: 3.565
- Referee: Joe Schmoe
- TV announcers (Midco Sports Plus): Corbu Stathes (play-by-play), Chris Ohm (analyst) and Allie Mosley (sideline)

Game information

First quarter

No scoring plays

Second quarter

- (5:13) STMN – Patrick Wagner 19 yard pass from Andy Peters, Elliot Huether kick (Drive: 5 plays, 78 yards, 2:37; STMN 7–0)
- (2:01) LIN – Jared Rhodes 1 yard run, Will Graham kick (Drive: 7 plays, 73 yards, 3:05; TIED 7–7)

Third quarter

- (12:13) STMN – Stefano Giovannelli 8 yard run, Elliot Huether kick (Drive: 7 plays, 48 yards, 2:35; STMN 14–7)
- (11:03) LIN – John Anthony 45 yard pass from Nate Glantz (Drive: 3 plays, 65 yards, 1:10; STMN 14–13)
- (8:44) STMN – JaShawn Todd 16 yard pass from Andy Peters, Elliot Huether kick (Drive: 6 plays, 83 yards, 2:13; STMN 21–13)

Fourth quarter

- (14:16) STMN – Joseph Koch 18 yard run, Elliot Huether kick (Drive: 6 plays, 43 yards, 3:37; STMN 28–13)
- (6:48) STMN – Zander Rockow 3 yard run, Elliot Huether kick (Drive: 10 plays, 40 yards, 6:00; STMN 35–13)

Statistics	LIN	STMN
First downs	22	23
Total yards	450	447
Rushing yards	132	275
Passing yards	318	172
Passing: Comp–Att–Int	18–30–0	11–19–0
Time of possession	30:43	29:17

Team	Category	Player	Statistics
Lindenwood	Passing	Nate Glantz	18/29, 318 yards, 1 TD
Lindenwood	Rushing	Steve Hall	14 carries, 70 yards
Lindenwood	Receiving	Drew Krobath	5 receptions, 128 yards
St. Thomas (MN)	Passing	Andy Peters	11/18, 172 yards, 2 TD
St. Thomas (MN)	Rushing	Joseph Koch	18 carries, 154 yards, 1 TD
St. Thomas (MN)	Receiving	Stefano Giovannelli	2 receptions, 51 yards

=== at Appalachian State (FBS) ===
Lindenwood Lions (0–1) at Appalachian State Mountaineers (FBS) (1–0) – Game summary

Quarter	1	2	3	4	Total
Lions	0	6	0	7	13
Mountaineers (FBS)	14	0	3	3	20

at Kidd Brewer Stadium • Boone, NC

- Date: September 6, 2025
- Game time: 3:30 PM EDT
- Game weather: Cloudy • Temperature: 72 °F (22 °C) • Wind: E at 8 miles per hour (13 km/h)
- Game attendance: 34,921
- Referee: Jeremy Parker
- TV announcers (ESPN+): David Jackson (play-by-play), Avery Johnson (analyst)

Game information

First quarter

- APP – Dalton Stroman 72-yard pass from AJ Swann (Dominic De Freitas kick), 14:42. Mountaineers 7–0. Drive: 1 play, 72 yards, 0:11.
- APP – Jaden Barnes 13-yard pass from AJ Swann (Dominic De Freitas kick), 3:32. Mountaineers 14–0. Drive: 6 plays, 75 yards, 2:27.

Second quarter

- LIN – Nate Glantz 1-yard run (Will Graham kick BLOCKED), 7:15. Mountaineers 14–6. Drive: 8 plays, 54 yards, 4:31.

Third quarter

- APP – Dominic De Freitas 29-yard field goal, 5:36. Mountaineers 17–6. Drive: 12 plays, 67 yards, 4:31.

Fourth quarter

- APP – Dominic De Freitas 24-yard field goal, 14:12. Mountaineers 20–6. Drive: 11 plays, 61 yards, 4:06.
- LIN – Rico Bond 24-yard pass from Nate Glantz (Will Graham kick), 3:34. Mountaineers 20–13. Drive: 9 plays, 46 yards, 5:41.

Statistics	LIN	APP
First downs	13	20
Plays–yards	69–216	67–503
Rushes–yards	33–(-1)	33–209
Passing yards	217	294
Passing: Comp–Att–Int	20–36–2	19–34–1
Turnovers	2	4
Time of possession	35:08	24:52

Team	Category	Player	Statistics
Lindenwood	Passing	Nate Glantz	20/36, 217 yards, TD, 2 INT
Lindenwood	Rushing	Jared Rhodes	11 carries, 20 yards
Lindenwood	Receiving	Rico Bond	7 receptions, 102 yards, TD
Appalachian State	Passing	AJ Swann	19/34, 294 yards, 2 TD, INT
Appalachian State	Rushing	Rashod Dubinion	25 Carries, 194 yards
Appalachian State	Receiving	Dalton Stroman	3 receptions, 142 yards, TD

=== at Charleston Southern ===
Game Three – Lindenwood Lions (0–2) at Charleston Southern Buccaneers (0–2) – Game summary

Quarter	1	2	3	4	Total
Lions	0	0	0	0	0
Buccaneers	0	0	0	0	0

at Buccaneer Field • North Charleston, SC

- Date: Saturday September 13, 2025
- Game time: 3:00 p.m. CDT
- TV announcers (ESPN+): Justin Biegel (play-by-play) and Ford Werness (analyst)

Game information

First quarter
Second quarter
Third quarter
Fourth quarter

Statistics	LIN	CHSO
First downs		
Total yards		
Rushing yards		
Passing yards		
Passing: Comp–Att–Int		
Time of possession		

Team	Category	Player	Statistics
Lindenwood	Passing		
Lindenwood	Rushing		
Lindenwood	Receiving		
Charleston Southern	Passing		
Charleston Southern	Rushing		
Charleston Southern	Receiving		

=== vs. Stony Brook ===
Game Four – Stony Brook Seawolves (1–2) at Lindenwood Lions (1–2) – Game summary

Quarter	1	2	3	4	Total
Seawolves	0	0	0	0	0
Lions	0	0	0	0	0

at Harlen C. Hunter Stadium • St. Charles, MO

- Date: Saturday September 20, 2025
- Game time: 6:00 p.m.
- TV announcers (ESPN+): Bob Ramsey (play-by-play) and Zach Zook (analyst)

Game information

First quarter
Second quarter
Third quarter
Fourth quarter

Statistics	STBK	LIN
First downs		
Total yards		
Rushing yards		
Passing yards		
Passing: Comp–Att–Int		
Time of possession		

Team	Category	Player	Statistics
Stony Brook	Passing		
Stony Brook	Rushing		
Stony Brook	Receiving		
Lindenwood	Passing		
Lindenwood	Rushing		
Lindenwood	Receiving		

=== at Miami (OH) (FBS) ===
Game Five – Lindenwood Lions (2–2) at Miami (OH) (FBS) RedHawks (0–3) – Game summary

Quarter	1	2	3	4	Total
Lions	0	0	0	0	0
RedHawks (FBS)	7	10	14	7	38

at Yager Stadium • Oxford, OH

- Date: Saturday September 27, 2025
- Game time: 2:30 p.m.
- Game weather: Sunny • Temperature: 81 °F (27 °C) • Wind: NW at 4 miles per hour (6.4 km/h)
- Game attendance: 10,504
- Referee: Rich Edwards
- TV announcers (ESPN+): Shawn Kenney (play-by-play) and Doc Holliday (analyst)

Game information

First quarter

- (8:21) M-OH – Jermaine Agee 8-yard punt return, Dom Dzioban kick (Miami (OH) 7–0)

Second quarter

- (10:32) M-OH – Dom Dzioban 33-yard field goal (Drive: 10 plays, 72 yards, 4:37; Miami (OH) 10–0)
- (7:32) M-OH – Kam Perry 31-yard pass from Henry Hesson, Dom Dzioban kick (Drive: 3 plays, 59 yards, 1:24; Miami (OH) 17–0)

Third quarter

- (7:49) M-OH – Kenny Tracy 20-yard run, Dom Dzioban kick (Drive: 10 plays, 80 yards, 5:11; Miami (OH) 24–0)
- (0:27) M-OH – Kam Perry 66-yard pass from Henry Hesson, Dom Dzioban kick (Drive: 3 plays, 71 yards, 1:34; Miami (OH) 31–0)

Fourth quarter

- (4:23) M-OH – Jordan Brunson 1-yard run, Dom Dzioban kick (Drive: 13 plays, 53 yards, 8:45; Miami (OH) 38–0)

Statistics	LIN	M-OH
First downs	9	23
Plays–yards	54–146	72–472
Rushes–yards	29–59	49–264
Passing yards	87	208
Passing: Comp–Att–Int	9–25–2	13–23–0
Turnovers	2	0
Time of possession	23:07	36:53

Team	Category	Player	Statistics
Lindenwood	Passing	Nate Glantz	9/25, 87 yards, 2 INT
Lindenwood	Rushing	Jared Rhodes	7 carries, 28 yards
Lindenwood	Receiving	Drew Krobath	2 receptions, 44 yards
Miami (OH)	Passing	Henry Hesson	13/21, 208 yards, 2 TD
Miami (OH)	Rushing	Kenny Tracy	20 carries, 134 yards, TD
Miami (OH)	Receiving	Kam Perry	3 receptions, 122 yards, 2 TD

=== vs. UT Martin ===
Game Six – UT Martin Skyhawks (1–4) at Lindenwood Lions (2–3) – Game summary

Quarter	1	2	3	4	Total
Skyhawks	0	7	0	7	14
Lions	7	0	14	9	30

at Harlen C. Hunter Stadium • St. Charles, MO

- Date: Saturday October 4, 2025
- Game time: 1:00 p.m.
- TV announcers (ESPN+): Bob Ramsey (play-by-play) and Zach Zook (analyst)

Game information

First quarter
Second quarter
Third quarter
Fourth quarter

Statistics	UTM	LIN
First downs		
Total yards		
Rushing yards		
Passing yards		
Passing: Comp–Att–Int		
Time of possession		

Team	Category	Player	Statistics
UT Martin	Passing		
UT Martin	Rushing		
UT Martin	Receiving		
Lindenwood	Passing		
Lindenwood	Rushing		
Lindenwood	Receiving		

=== vs. No. 8 Tennessee Tech ===
Game Seven – No. 8 Tennessee Tech Golden Eagles (6–0) at Lindenwood Lions (3–3) – Game summary

Quarter	1	2	3	4	Total
No. 8 Golden Eagles	0	17	21	14	52
Lions	7	7	7	7	28

at Harlen C. Hunter Stadium • St. Charles, MO

- Date: Saturday October 18, 2025
- Game time: 1:00 p.m.
- TV announcers (ESPN+): TBA

Game information

First quarter
Second quarter
Third quarter
Fourth quarter

Statistics	TNTC	LIN
First downs		
Total yards		
Rushing yards		
Passing yards		
Passing: Comp–Att–Int		
Time of possession		

Team	Category	Player	Statistics
Tennessee Tech	Passing		
Tennessee Tech	Rushing		
Tennessee Tech	Receiving		
Lindenwood	Passing		
Lindenwood	Rushing		
Lindenwood	Receiving		

=== vs. Gardner–Webb ===
Game Eight – Gardner–Webb Runnin' Bulldogs (4–3) at Lindenwood Lions (3–4) – Game summary

Quarter	1	2	3	4	Total
Runnin' Bulldogs	0	0	0	0	0
Lions	0	0	0	0	0

at Harlen C. Hunter Stadium • St. Charles, MO

- Date: Saturday October 25, 2025
- Game time: 2:00 p.m.
- TV announcers (ESPN+): TBA

Game information

First quarter
Second quarter
Third quarter
Fourth quarter

Statistics	GWEB	LIN
First downs		
Total yards		
Rushing yards		
Passing yards		
Passing: Comp–Att–Int		
Time of possession		

Team	Category	Player	Statistics
Gardner–Webb	Passing		
Gardner–Webb	Rushing		
Gardner–Webb	Receiving		
Lindenwood	Passing		
Lindenwood	Rushing		
Lindenwood	Receiving		

=== at Tennessee State ===
Game Nine – Lindenwood Lions (3–5) at Tennessee State Tigers (2–6) – Game summary

Quarter	1	2	3	4	Total
Lions	0	0	0	0	0
Tigers	0	0	0	0	0

at Nissan Stadium • Nashville, TN

- Date: Saturday November 1, 2025
- Game time: TBA
- TV announcers (ESPN+): TBA

Game information

First quarter
Second quarter
Third quarter
Fourth quarter

Statistics	LIN	TNST
First downs		
Total yards		
Rushing yards		
Passing yards		
Passing: Comp–Att–Int		
Time of possession		

Team	Category	Player	Statistics
Lindenwood	Passing		
Lindenwood	Rushing		
Lindenwood	Receiving		
Tennessee State	Passing		
Tennessee State	Rushing		
Tennessee State	Receiving		

=== at Western Illinois ===
Game Ten – Lindenwood Lions (4–5) at Western Illinois Leathernecks (2–7) – Game summary

Quarter	1	2	3	4	Total
Lions	0	0	0	0	0
Leathernecks	0	0	0	0	0

at Hanson Field • Macomb, IL

- Date: Saturday November 8, 2025
- Game time: 1:00 p.m.
- TV announcers (ESPN+): TBA

Game information

First quarter
Second quarter
Third quarter
Fourth quarter

Statistics	LIN	WIU
First downs		
Total yards		
Rushing yards		
Passing yards		
Passing: Comp–Att–Int		
Time of possession		

Team	Category	Player	Statistics
Lindenwood	Passing		
Lindenwood	Rushing		
Lindenwood	Receiving		
Western Illinois	Passing		
Western Illinois	Rushing		
Western Illinois	Receiving		

=== vs. Eastern Illinois ===
Game Eleven – Eastern Illinois Panthers (0–0) at Lindenwood Lions (0–0) – Game summary

Quarter	1	2	3	4	Total
Panthers	0	0	0	0	0
Lions	0	0	0	0	0

at Harlen C. Hunter Stadium • St. Charles, MO

- Date: Saturday November 15, 2025
- Game time: 2:00 p.m.
- TV announcers (ESPN+): TBA

Game information

First quarter
Second quarter
Third quarter
Fourth quarter

Statistics	EIU	LIN
First downs		
Total yards		
Rushing yards		
Passing yards		
Passing: Comp–Att–Int		
Time of possession		

Team	Category	Player	Statistics
Eastern Illinois	Passing		
Eastern Illinois	Rushing		
Eastern Illinois	Receiving		
Lindenwood	Passing		
Lindenwood	Rushing		
Lindenwood	Receiving		

=== at Southeast Missouri State ===
Game Twelve – Lindenwood Lions (0–0) at Southeast Missouri State Redhawks (0–0) – Game summary

Quarter	1	2	3	4	Total
Lions	0	0	0	0	0
Buccaneers	0	0	0	0	0

at Houck Stadium • Cape Girardeau, MO

- Date: Saturday November 22, 2025
- Game time: 1:00 p.m.
- TV announcers (ESPN+): TBA

Game information

First quarter
Second quarter
Third quarter
Fourth quarter

Statistics	LIN	SEMO
First downs		
Total yards		
Rushing yards		
Passing yards		
Passing: Comp–Att–Int		
Time of possession		

Team	Category	Player	Statistics
Lindenwood	Passing		
Lindenwood	Rushing		
Lindenwood	Receiving		
Southeast Missouri State	Passing		
Southeast Missouri State	Rushing		
Southeast Missouri State	Receiving		

== Personnel ==
=== Roster ===
2025 Lindenwood Lions football team roster
Players
Coaches
Offense

Pos.	#	Name	Class
WR	0	Ryan Boyd	Fr
WR	1	Rico Bond	Fr
QB	2	Gavin Shaigineik	So
WR	3	CJ Reese	Fr
WR	4	Jalen Smith	So
WR	5	John Anthony	Jr
QB	6	Hoyt Gregory	Fr
RB	7	Jared Rhodes	Jr
WR	8	Drew Krobath	So
QB	9	Pops Battle	Fr
WR	10	Jacques Wyatt	So
QB	18	Nate Glantz	Sr
RB	21	Robert Giaimo	Sr
RB	22	Steve Hall	So
RB	26	River Lakey	So
RB	33	Evan Shaigineik	Fr
RB	35	Bryce Giesler	So
RB	36	La'Revious Woods	Fr
TE	43	Aiden Grote	Fr
WR	47	Nick Manzardo	Fr
OL	55	Tony Failla	Jr
OL	56	Gavin Hulet	Sr
OL	57	Eli Freeman	So
OL	58	Andrew Swingle	Fr
OL	60	Trey Morrison	Jr
OL	65	Gabe Gaines	So
OL	66	Aiden Taylor	Fr
OL	67	Connor Cook	Fr
OL	70	Carter Briddell	Fr
OL	72	Cody Kamfonik	Jr
OL	73	Quinn Brown	Fr
OL	74	Danny Zarco	Fr
OL	75	Logan Hunter	So
OL	76	Cam Lawson	Jr
OL	77	Joshua Robinson	So
OL	78	Jacob O'Donnell	Fr
OL	79	Nate Compere	So
TE	80	Mac Busteed	So
TE	81	Cole Watson	So
WR	82	Elijah Roy	Fr
TE	83	Luke Birkner	Fr
TE	84	Vaughn Johnson	Fr
TE	85	Mason Brown	Jr
TE	86	Darrin Fugitt	Jr
TE	87	Chris Camy	Sr
WR	88	Christopher Bennett Jr.	Fr
WR	89	Waylon DeGrave	Fr

Defense

Pos.	#	Name	Class
DB	0	Elijah Thomas	So
DB	1	Eric Gant	Sr
DB	2	Jarad Mosely	Jr
DB	3	Mason Jones	So
DL	4	Kobe McClendon	Sr
LB	5	Jacob Waller	Jr
DE	6	Jesse Smith	So
DB	7	Jayden Patrick	Sr
DB	9	Zech Pratt	Jr
DE	11	Tajay Passmore	Sr
DB	12	Josh Newkirk	So
DB	13	Alex Dawkins	Jr
DB	14	Thomas Gothard	So
LB	15	Sanjay Strickland	Sr
DB	16	Luke Cook	So
LB	17	Ethan Beard	So
DB	19	Sam Owens	Fr
LB	20	Legend Robinson	Jr
LB	23	Devon Edwards	Sr
LB	24	Nolan O'Hara	Jr
DB	25	Noel Vallejo	Jr
DB	28	Brian Fitzmaurice Jr.	Fr
DB	29	Aiden Knapke	Fr
LB	30	Andrew Baumgart	Fr
LB	31	Mason Van Der Brink	Fr
LB	32	Caelum Jones	So
LB	34	Owen Thomas	Fr
LB	38	Caleb Jacobmeier	So
DB	39	Luke Zook	Fr
LB	41	Zach Lewis	So
DT	44	Ashtin Rustemeyer	Jr
DE	48	Tristan Ginn	Fr
LB	49	Blake Ashby	Fr
DB	50	Carter Johnson	Fr
LB	52	Jaymason Willingham	Sr
DL	53	Maika Finau	Jr
DE	59	Daniel Simon	Fr
DT	71	Chris Abihudi	Fr
DE	90	Mason Burke	Fr
DE	91	Ke'Andre McClendon	Fr
DE	92	Reece Satterwhite	Fr
DT	93	Tomasi Finau	Jr
DT	94	Feki Finau	So
DT	95	Keenan Paschall	Fr
DT	96	Demetrius Jones	Fr
DT	97	Jamison Kemp	So
DT	98	Andrew Zook	So
DT	99	Eddie Becu	So
LB		David Amaliri	So
LB		Zach Neilsen	Jr
DB		DeVonta Owens	Jr

Special teams

Pos.	#	Name	Class
K	37	Will Graham	So
P	40	A.J. Vinatieri	Jr
P	42	Connor Lander	Fr
LS	45	Nelson Pipes	Sr
K	51	Brogan Hartman	Fr
LS	54	Zach Ely	Fr
LS	62	Jack Berry	Jr

Head coach

- Jed Stugart

Coordinators/assistant coaches

- Dusty Hovorka – Offensive coordinator/Quarterbacks
- Eric Inama – Defensive coordinator/Safeties/NFL liaison
- Bryan Baldwin – Special teams/Cornerbacks
- Jarrett Grabbe – Defensive ends
- Lane Lawson – Running backs
- Hunter Harris – Offensive line
- Lavell Jackson – Wide receivers
- Tommy Crayton – Tight ends
- Alex Garcia – Linebackers
- Monty Roe – Defensive tackles

Legend

- (C) Team captain
- (S) Suspended
- (I) Ineligible
- Injured
- Redshirt

Roster
Last update: 8/6/25
