= 2025 Tennessee Tech Golden Eagles football team =

American college football season

2025 Tennessee Tech Golden Eagles football

OVC–Big South champion

NCAA Division I First Round, L 6–31 vs. North Dakota
- Conference: OVC–Big South Football Association

Ranking
- STATS: No. 16
- FCS Coaches: No. 15
- Record: 11–2 (8–0 OVC–Big South)
- Head coach: Bobby Wilder (2nd season)
- Offensive coordinator: Brian Scott (2nd season)
- Defensive coordinator: Chase Mummau (1st season)
- Home stadium: Tucker Stadium

2025 OVC–Big South football standings
	Conf.			Overall
Team	W		L	W		L
No. 16 Tennessee Tech $^	8	–	0	11	–	2
UT Martin	6	–	2	6	–	6
Gardner–Webb	5	–	3	7	–	5
Lindenwood	5	–	3	6	–	6
Charleston Southern	4	–	4	5	–	7
Southeast Missouri State	3	–	5	4	–	8
Western Illinois	3	–	5	4	–	8
Eastern Illinois	2	–	6	3	–	8
Tennessee State	0	–	8	2	–	10
$ – Conference champion; ^ – FCS playoff participant; Rankings from STATS Poll

The 2025 Tennessee Tech Golden Eagles football team represented Tennessee Tech University as a member of the OVC–Big South Football Association during the 2025 NCAA Division I FCS football season. They were led by second-year head coach Bobby Wilder. The Golden Eagles played home games at Tucker Stadium in Cookeville, Tennessee. After a win against the Davidson in Week 3, the Golden Eagles started 3–0 for the first time since 1977.

== Offseason ==
=== Preseason poll ===
The OVC–Big South Football Association released its preseason poll on July 16, 2025. The Golden Eagles were picked to finish first in the conference.

=== Transfers ===
==== Outgoing ====
Player	Position	Destination
Caldra Williford	DB	Baylor
Dyson Bell	DB	Copiah–Lincoln
Jordyn Potts	QB	Eastern Kentucky
Cayman Spaulding	LB	Georgia Tech
Myles Parker	DL	Houston
Mekhi Penix	WR	Independence CC
Seth Maldonado	WR	Lincoln (CA)
Bertin Placide	DB	Merrimack
Turner McLaughlin	LS	South Florida
Daniel Rickert	DE	Virginia
Elijah Ruiz	OL	West Georgia
Theron Gaines	DL	Withdrawn

==== Incoming ====
Player	Position	Previous school
Maurice Lapierre	DE	Alabama State
Stefon Young-Rolle	DE	Alabama State
Tyler Swann	DL	Alabama State
Andrew Smith	DB	Alcorn State
Cash Devaughn	DT	Barton
Gavin Bryson	DB	Central Connecticut
Leon Thomas	DB	Charleston Southern
Tyler Wagner	OL	Coastal Carolina
Gregory Turner	LB	East Carolina
Christian Shaw	DB	East Texas A&M
Drew Wilder	OL	Eastern Illinois
Kekoa Visperas	QB	Eastern Washington
Brian Courtney	TE	Florida State
Darius Meeks	OL	Grambling State
Richie Munoz	QB	Incarnate Word
Kaleb Purdy	S	Kansas
Chinonso Opara	OL	LIU
Q'Daryius Jennings	RB	Murray State
Jeremy Mendez	DT	Pace
Noah Robinson	WR	Robert Morris
Griffin Patterson	TE	Shippensburg
Tucker Kyne	TE	Tennessee State
Bryant Williams	WR	Tennessee State
Quintell Quinn	RB	Texas Southern
Jace Wilson	QB	Texas Southern
Ahmad Haston	QB	UMass
Kaleb Brown	LB	UTSA
Josh Hand	LB	Virginia Tech
Kennedy Fauntleroy	RB	Wake Forest
Maury Sullivan	WR	Washburn
Chima Iwuagwu	DL	West Texas A&M
Tre Holloway	WR	Wheeling

== Schedule ==
Date	Time	Opponent	Rank	Site	TV	Result	Attendance
August 30	12:00 p.m.	Cumberland*	No. 21	Tucker Stadium; Cookeville, TN	ESPN+	W 65–0	N/A
September 6	12:00 p.m.	Chattanooga*	No. 17	Tucker Stadium; Cookeville, TN	ESPN+	W 45–17	4,471
September 13	12:00 p.m.	Davidson*	No. 15	Tucker Stadium; Cookeville, TN	ESPN+	W 72–14	7,278
September 27	3:30 p.m.	at Tennessee State	No. 13	Nissan Stadium; Nashville, TN (Sgt. York Trophy)	ESPN+	W 35–8	2,137
October 4	12:00 p.m.	Western Illinois	No. 11	Tucker Stadium; Cookeville, TN	ESPN+	W 66–20	5,108
October 11	3:00 p.m.	at Charleston Southern	No. 10	Buccaneer Field; North Charleston, SC	ESPN+	W 27–13	1,505
October 18	1:00 p.m.	at Lindenwood	No. 8	Harlen C. Hunter Stadium; St. Charles, MO	ESPN+	W 52–28	2,737
October 25	12:00 p.m.	Southeast Missouri State	No. 9	Tucker Stadium; Cookeville, TN	ESPN+	W 42–23	5,472
November 1	12:00 p.m.	Gardner–Webb^{†}	No. 9	Tucker Stadium; Cookeville, TN	ESPN+	W 27–21	7,517
November 8	12:00 p.m.	at Eastern Illinois	No. 5	O'Brien Field; Charleston, IL	ESPN+	W 21–9	2,266
November 15	12:30 p.m.	at Kentucky*	No. 5	Kroger Field; Lexington, KY	SECN+/ESPN+	L 10–42	53,686
November 22	12:00 p.m.	UT Martin	No. 6	Tucker Stadium; Cookeville, TN (Sgt. York Trophy)	ESPN+	W 20–17	6,554
November 29	12:00 p.m.	No. 19 North Dakota*	No. 6	Tucker Stadium; Cookeville, TN (NCAA Division I First Round)	ESPN+	L 6–31	4,641
*Non-conference game; ^{†}Homecoming; Rankings from STATS Poll released prior to the game; All times are in Central time

== Roster ==
2025 Tennessee Tech Golden Eagles football team roster
Players
Coaches
Offense

Pos.	#	Name	Class
QB	0	Kekoa Visperas	Sr
OL	55	Drew Wilder	Sr

Defense

Pos.	#	Name	Class

Special teams

Pos.	#	Name	Class

Head coach

- Bobby Wilder

Coordinators/assistant coaches

Legend

- (C) Team captain
- (S) Suspended
- (I) Ineligible
- Injured
- Redshirt

Roster

== Game summaries ==
=== vs. Cumberland (TN) (NAIA) ===
Game One – Cumberland Phoenix (NAIA) (0–0) at No. 21 Tennessee Tech Golden Eagles (0–0) – Game summary

Quarter	1	2	3	4	Total
Phoenix (NAIA)	0	0	0	0	0
No. 21 Golden Eagles	21	24	7	13	65

at Tucker Stadium • Cookeville, TN

- Date: Saturday August 30, 2025
- Game time: 12:00 PM CDT
- Game weather: Cloudy • Temperature: 78 °F (26 °C)
- Referee: Gabriel Tomlin
- TV announcers (ESPN+): Dylan Vazzano (play-by-play) and Sam Brooks (analyst)

Game information

First quarter

- (9:55) TNTC – Torin Baker 25-yard pass from Kekoa Visperas, Dom LeBlanc kick (Drive: 7 plays, 63 yards, 2:45; Tennessee Tech 7–0)
- (2:31) TNTC – Quintell Quinn 4-yard run, Dom LeBlanc kick (Drive: 4 plays, 70 yards, 2:05; Tennessee Tech 14–0)
- (0:42) TNTC – Aidan Littles 11-yard pass from Kekoa Visperas, Dom LeBlanc kick (Drive: 1 play, 11 yards, 0:05; Tennessee Tech 21–0)

Second quarter

- (12:52) TNTC – Q'Darryius Jennings 19-yard run, Dom LeBlanc kick (Drive: 2 plays, 24 yards, 0:43; Tennessee Tech 28–0)
- (4:06) TNTC – Tre' Holloway 3-yard pass from Kekoa Visperas, Dom LeBlanc kick (Drive: 7 plays, 80 yards, 2:34; Tennessee Tech 35–0)
- (2:14) TNTC – Tre' Holloway 53-yard punt return, Dom LeBlanc kick (Tennessee Tech 42–0)
- (0:00) TNTC – Dom LeBlanc 43-yard field goal (Drive: 7 plays, 57 yards, 0:51; Tennessee Tech 45–0)

Third quarter

- (5:31) TNTC – Q'Darryius Jennings 25-yard run, Gavin Wilson kick (Drive: 6 plays, 57 yards, 3:25; Tennessee Tech 52–0)

Fourth quarter

- (9:55) TNTC – Jace Wilson 4-yard run (Drive: 6 plays, 61 yards, 8:47; Tennessee Tech 58–0)
- (1:05) TNTC – Maurice Sims 78-yard run, Gavin Wilson kick (Drive: 3 plays, 85 yards, 1:03; Tennessee Tech 58–0)

Statistics	CUMB	TNTC
First downs	9	24
Total yards	104	570
Rushing yards	64	286
Passing yards	40	284
Passing: Comp–Att–Int	7–16–1	19–28–0
Time of possession	29:46	30:14

Team	Category	Player	Statistics
Cumberland (TN)	Passing	Zach Holtzclaw	6/15, 34 yards, INT
Cumberland (TN)	Rushing	Jaylen Abston	10 carries, 29 yards
Cumberland (TN)	Receiving	Kaiden Hatchett	4 receptions, 23 yards
Tennessee Tech	Passing	Kekoa Visperas	17/26, 250 yards, 3 TD
Tennessee Tech	Rushing	Maurice Sims	5 carries, 92 yards, TD
Tennessee Tech	Receiving	Noah Robinson	3 receptions, 58 yards

=== vs. Chattanooga ===
Game Two – Chattanooga Mocs (0–1) at No. 17 Tennessee Tech Golden Eagles (1–0) – Game summary

Quarter	1	2	3	4	Total
Mocs	3	0	7	7	17
No. 17 Golden Eagles	21	3	14	7	45

at Tucker Stadium • Cookeville, TN

- Date: Saturday September 6, 2025
- Game time: 12:00 PM CDT
- TV announcers (ESPN+): Dylan Vazzano (play-by-play) and Sam Brooks (analyst)

Game information

First quarter
Second quarter
Third quarter
Fourth quarter

Statistics	UTC	TNTC
First downs	15	22
Total yards	274	513
Rushing yards	25	221
Passing yards	249	292
Passing: Comp–Att–Int	22–45–1	19–28–1
Time of possession	32:42	27:18

Team	Category	Player	Statistics
Chattanooga	Passing	Camden Orth	22/45, 249 yards, TD, INT
Chattanooga	Rushing	Ryan Ingram	12 carries, 22 yards, TD
Chattanooga	Receiving	Markell Quick	5 receptions, 94 yards, TD
Tennessee Tech	Passing	Kekoa Visperas	18/27, 240 yards, 2 TD, INT
Tennessee Tech	Rushing	Quintell Quinn	6 carries, 76 yards, TD
Tennessee Tech	Receiving	Tre' Holloway	4 receptions, 74 yards

=== vs. Davidson ===
Game Three – Davidson Wildcats (0–2) at No. 15 Tennessee Tech Golden Eagles (2–0) – Game summary

Quarter	1	2	3	4	Total
Wildcats	0	14	0	0	14
No. 15 Golden Eagles	28	17	21	6	72

at Tucker Stadium • Cookeville, TN

- Date: Saturday September 13, 2025
- Game time: 12:00 PM CDT
- TV announcers (ESPN+): Dylan Vazzano (play-by-play) and Sam Brooks (analyst)

Game information

First quarter
Second quarter
Third quarter
Fourth quarter

Statistics	DAV	TNTC
First downs	12	33
Total yards	206	576
Rushing yards	74	308
Passing yards	132	268
Passing: Comp–Att–Int	16–27–1	25–37–0
Time of possession	28:22	31:38

Team	Category	Player	Statistics
Davidson	Passing	Coulter Clealand	16/26, 132 yards, 2 TD, INT
Davidson	Rushing	Mari Adams	11 carries, 58 yards
Davidson	Receiving	Ivan Hoyt	4 receptions, 53 yards, TD
Tennessee Tech	Passing	Kekoa Visperas	23/32, 246 yards, 3 TD
Tennessee Tech	Rushing	Quintell Quinn	9 carries, 122 yards, 2 TD
Tennessee Tech	Receiving	Maury Sullivan	7 receptions, 78 yards

=== at Tennessee State (Sgt. York Trophy) ===
Game Four – No. 13 Tennessee Tech Golden Eagles (3–0) at Tennessee State Tigers (1–2) – Game summary

Quarter	1	2	3	4	Total
No. 13 Golden Eagles	7	14	14	0	35
Tigers	0	0	3	5	8

at Nissan Stadium • Nashville, TN

- Date: Saturday September 27, 2025
- Game time: 3:30 PM
- TV announcers (ESPN+): Dan Lang (play-by-play) and Dean Cokinos (analyst)

Game information

First quarter
Second quarter
Third quarter
Fourth quarter

Statistics	TNTC	TNST
First downs		
Total yards		
Rushing yards		
Passing yards		
Passing: Comp–Att–Int		
Time of possession		

Team	Category	Player	Statistics
Tennessee Tech	Passing		
Tennessee Tech	Rushing		
Tennessee Tech	Receiving		
Tennessee State	Passing		
Tennessee State	Rushing		
Tennessee State	Receiving		

=== vs. Western Illinois ===
Game Five – Western Illinois Leathernecks (1–4) at No. 11 Tennessee Tech Golden Eagles (4–0) – Game summary

Quarter	1	2	3	4	Total
Leathernecks	7	10	3	0	20
No. 11 Golden Eagles	10	28	14	14	66

at Tucker Stadium • Cookeville, TN

- Date: Saturday October 4, 2025
- Game time: 12:00 PM
- TV announcers (ESPN+): TBA

Game information

First quarter
Second quarter
Third quarter
Fourth quarter

Statistics	WIU	TNTC
First downs		
Total yards		
Rushing yards		
Passing yards		
Passing: Comp–Att–Int		
Time of possession		

Team	Category	Player	Statistics
Western Illinois	Passing		
Western Illinois	Rushing		
Western Illinois	Receiving		
Tennessee Tech	Passing		
Tennessee Tech	Rushing		
Tennessee Tech	Receiving		

=== at Charleston Southern ===
Game Six – No. 10 Tennessee Tech Golden Eagles (5–0) at Charleston Southern Buccaneers (1–5) – Game summary

Quarter	1	2	3	4	Total
No. 10 Golden Eagles	7	13	7	0	27
Buccaneers	3	7	0	3	13

at Buccaneer Field • North Charleston, SC

- Date: Saturday October 11, 2025
- Game time: 3:00 PM
- TV announcers (ESPN+): TBA

Game information

First quarter
Second quarter
Third quarter
Fourth quarter

Statistics	TNTC	CHSO
First downs		
Total yards		
Rushing yards		
Passing yards		
Passing: Comp–Att–Int		
Time of possession		

Team	Category	Player	Statistics
Tennessee Tech	Passing		
Tennessee Tech	Rushing		
Tennessee Tech	Receiving		
Charleston Southern	Passing		
Charleston Southern	Rushing		
Charleston Southern	Receiving		

=== at Lindenwood ===
Game Seven – No. 8 Tennessee Tech Golden Eagles (6–0) at Lindenwood Lions (3–3) – Game summary

Quarter	1	2	3	4	Total
No. 8 Golden Eagles	0	17	21	14	52
Lions	7	7	7	7	28

at Harlen C. Hunter Stadium • St. Charles, MO

- Date: Saturday October 18, 2025
- Game time: 1:00 PM CDT
- TV announcers (ESPN+): TBA

Game information

First quarter
Second quarter
Third quarter
Fourth quarter

Statistics	TNTC	LIN
First downs		
Total yards		
Rushing yards		
Passing yards		
Passing: Comp–Att–Int		
Time of possession		

Team	Category	Player	Statistics
Tennessee Tech	Passing		
Tennessee Tech	Rushing		
Tennessee Tech	Receiving		
Lindenwood	Passing		
Lindenwood	Rushing		
Lindenwood	Receiving		

=== vs. Southeast Missouri State ===
Game Eight – Southeast Missouri State Redhawks (3–4) at No. 9 Tennessee Tech Golden Eagles (7–0) – Game summary

Quarter	1	2	3	4	Total
Redhawks	0	6	10	7	23
No. 9 Golden Eagles	7	14	0	21	42

at Tucker Stadium • Cookeville, TN

- Date: Saturday October 25, 2025
- Game time: 12:00 PM CDT
- TV announcers (ESPN+): TBA

Game information

First quarter
Second quarter
Third quarter
Fourth quarter

Statistics	SEMO	TNTC
First downs		
Total yards		
Rushing yards		
Passing yards		
Passing: Comp–Att–Int		
Time of possession		

Team	Category	Player	Statistics
Southeast Missouri State	Passing		
Southeast Missouri State	Rushing		
Southeast Missouri State	Receiving		
Tennessee Tech	Passing		
Tennessee Tech	Rushing		
Tennessee Tech	Receiving		

=== vs. Gardner–Webb ===
Game Nine – Gardner–Webb Runnin' Bulldogs (5–3) at No. 9 Tennessee Tech Golden Eagles (8–0) – Game summary

Quarter	1	2	3	4	Total
Runnin' Bulldogs	0	0	0	0	0
No. 9 Golden Eagles	0	0	0	0	0

at Tucker Stadium • Cookeville, TN

- Date: Saturday November 1, 2025
- Game time: 12:00 PM CDT
- TV announcers (ESPN+): TBA

Game information

First quarter
Second quarter
Third quarter
Fourth quarter

Statistics	GWEB	TNTC
First downs		
Total yards		
Rushing yards		
Passing yards		
Passing: Comp–Att–Int		
Time of possession		

Team	Category	Player	Statistics
Gardner–Webb	Passing		
Gardner–Webb	Rushing		
Gardner–Webb	Receiving		
Tennessee Tech	Passing		
Tennessee Tech	Rushing		
Tennessee Tech	Receiving		

=== at Eastern Illinois ===
Game Ten – No. 5 Tennessee Tech Golden Eagles (9–0) at Eastern Illinois Panthers (3–6) – Game summary

Quarter	1	2	3	4	Total
No. 5 Golden Eagles	0	0	0	0	0
Panthers	0	0	0	0	0

at O'Brien Field • Charleston, IL

- Date: Saturday November 8, 2025
- Game time: 12:00 PM CST
- TV announcers (ESPN+): TBA

Game information

First quarter
Second quarter
Third quarter
Fourth quarter

Statistics	TNTC	EIU
First downs		
Total yards		
Rushing yards		
Passing yards		
Passing: Comp–Att–Int		
Time of possession		

Team	Category	Player	Statistics
Tennessee Tech	Passing		
Tennessee Tech	Rushing		
Tennessee Tech	Receiving		
Eastern Illinois	Passing		
Eastern Illinois	Rushing		
Eastern Illinois	Receiving		

=== at Kentucky (FBS) ===
Game Eleven – No. 5 Tennessee Tech Golden Eagles (10–0) at Kentucky Wildcats (FBS) (4–5) – Game summary

Quarter	1	2	3	4	Total
No. 5 Golden Eagles	0	7	3	0	10
(FBS) Wildcats	14	14	7	7	42

at Kroger Field • Lexington, Kentucky

- Date: Saturday November 15, 2025
- Game time: 12:30 PM CST
- Game weather:
- Game attendance: 53,686
- Referee: James Carter
- TV announcers (SECN+/ESPN+): Jay Alter (play-by-play) and Rocky Boiman (analyst)

Game information

First quarter

- UK – Seth McGowan 1-yard run (Jacob Kauwe kick), 6:55. Wildcats 7–0. Drive: 11 plays, 88 yards, 6:37.
- UK – Cutter Boley 30-yard run (Jacob Kauwe kick), 2:23. Wildcats 14–0. Drive: 6 plays, 59 yards, 2:10.

Second quarter

- UK – Seth McGowan 4-yard run (Jacob Kauwe kick), 3:46. Wildcats 21–0. Drive: 9 plays, 51 yards, 4:15.
- TNTC – Brian Courtney 8-yard pass from Kekoa Visperas (Dom LeBlanc kick), 1:18. Wildcats 21–7. Drive: 9 plays, 65 yards, 2:28.
- UK – Seth McGowan 1-yard run (Jacob Kauwe kick), 0:19. Wildcats 28–7. Drive: 4 plays, 45 yards, 0:51.

Third quarter

- TNTC – Dom LeBlanc 38-yard field goal, 9:15. Wildcats 28–10. Drive: 8 plays, 40 yards, 4:01.
- UK – Hardley Gilmore IV 45-yard pass from Cutter Boley (Jacob Kauwe kick), 2:24. Wildcats 35–10. Drive: 12 plays, 75 yards, 6:51.

Fourth quarter

- UK – Dante Dowdell 19-yard run (Zach Schreiner kick), 10:37. Wildcats 42–10. Drive: 5 plays, 74 yards, 2:30.

Statistics	TNTC	UK
First downs	15	25
Plays–yards	56–264	66–468
Rushes–yards	33–143	39–207
Passing yards	121	261
Passing: comp–att–int	14–23–1	21–27–0
Turnovers	1	0
Time of possession	27:34	32:26

Team	Category	Player	Statistics
Tennessee Tech	Passing	Kekoa Visperas	13/21, 112 yards, TD, INT
Tennessee Tech	Rushing	Kekoa Visperas	6 carries, 44 yards
Tennessee Tech	Receiving	Maury Sullivan	6 receptions, 63 yards
Kentucky	Passing	Cutter Boley	18/21, 236 yards, TD
Kentucky	Rushing	Dante Dowdell	13 carries, 87 yards, TD
Kentucky	Receiving	Kendrick Law	11 receptions, 124 yards

=== vs. UT Martin (Sgt. York Trophy) ===
Game Twelve – UT Martin Skyhawks (6–5) at No. 6 Tennessee Tech Golden Eagles (10–1) – Game summary

Quarter	1	2	3	4	Total
Skyhawks	7	3	0	7	17
No. 6 Golden Eagles	0	3	7	10	20

at Tucker Stadium • Cookeville, TN

- Date: Saturday November 22, 2025
- Game time: 12:00 PM CDT
- TV announcers (ESPN+): TBA

Game information

First quarter
Second quarter
Third quarter
Fourth quarter

Statistics	UTM	TNTC
First downs		
Total yards		
Rushing yards		
Passing yards		
Passing: Comp–Att–Int		
Time of possession		

Team	Category	Player	Statistics
UT Martin	Passing		
UT Martin	Rushing		
UT Martin	Receiving		
Tennessee Tech	Passing		
Tennessee Tech	Rushing		
Tennessee Tech	Receiving		

== Ranking movements ==
Ranking movements Legend: ██ Increase in ranking ██ Decrease in ranking т = Tied with team above or below
	Week														
Poll	Pre	1	2	3	4	5	6	7	8	9	10	11	12	13	Final
STATS FCS	21	17	15	12	13	11	10	8	9	9	5	5	6	6	16
Coaches	22т	20	16	12т	11	9	7	8	8	8	5	6	8	7	15
