= 2025 Eastern Illinois Panthers football team =

American college football season

2025 Eastern Illinois Panthers football
- Conference: OVC–Big South
- Record: 3–9 (2–6 OVC–Big South)
- Head coach: Chris Wilkerson (4th season)
- Offensive coordinator: Kyle Derickson (2nd season)
- Defensive coordinator: Andrew Strobel (1st season)
- Home stadium: O'Brien Field

2025 OVC–Big South football standings
	Conf.			Overall
Team	W		L	W		L
No. 16 Tennessee Tech $^	8	–	0	11	–	2
UT Martin	6	–	2	6	–	6
Gardner–Webb	5	–	3	7	–	5
Lindenwood	5	–	3	6	–	6
Charleston Southern	4	–	4	5	–	7
Southeast Missouri State	3	–	5	4	–	8
Western Illinois	3	–	5	4	–	8
Eastern Illinois	2	–	6	3	–	8
Tennessee State	0	–	8	2	–	10
$ – Conference champion; ^ – FCS playoff participant; Rankings from STATS Poll

The 2025 Eastern Illinois Panthers football team represented Eastern Illinois University as a member of the OVC–Big South Football Association during the 2025 NCAA Division I FCS football season. The Panthers were led by fourth-year head coach Chris Wilkerson and played their home games at O'Brien Field located in Charleston, Illinois.

== Offseason ==
=== Preseason poll ===
The Big South-OVC Conference released their preseason poll on July 16, 2025. The Panthers were picked to finish sixth in the conference.

=== Transfers ===
==== Outgoing ====
Player	Position	Destination
Kaelin Drakeford	DB	Chattanooga
Nick Coates	S	Chattanooga
Nijhay Burt	DB	Michigan State
Elijawah Tolbert	LB	Montana
Jacob Horvath	P	North Carolina
Drew Wilder	OL	Tennessee Tech
MJ Flowers	RB	UConn
Cody Silzer	DE	Winona State
Aaron Rice	WR	Unknown
Joshua Johnson	OL	Unknown
Malik Rainey	DB	Unknown

==== Incoming ====
Player	Position	Previous school
Jordan Yandila	OL	Adams State
Charles Kellom	RB	Akron
Jack Tremblay	WR	Central Michigan
James Collins	DL	College of the Sequoias
Jerry Addo-Boateng	DB	Defiance
Noah Williams	LB	Dodge City
Aaron Rice	P	DuPage
Mason Miller	P	Marian (IN)
Jefferson McKinnon	LS	Marist
Nick Vecchiarelli	S	Marist
Bruce Mitchell	S	Mississippi Valley State
Kefa Pereira	DL	Monterey Peninsula
Jihad McCall	S	Morehead State
Steven Arteaga	LB	Palomar
Dante Thompson	OL	Robert Morris
Brandon Worsley	DB	San Diego Mesa
Jesse Lajes	RB	San Jose City
Jourden Hale-Frater	OL	Tennessee State
Knowledge Davis	DL	Tyler
Cole LaCrue	QB	Wisconsin

=== Recruiting class ===
Name	Position	Height	Weight	Hometown	High School
Kennyan Chandler	LB	5-10	230	Kankakee, IL	Kankakee
Michael Curry	RB	5-10	180	Louisville, KY	Atherton
Brady Ford	QB	6-0	195	Toledo, OH	Whitmer
Tyler Fortis	DL	6-2	265	Park Ridge, IL	Maine South
Dejan Guzina	OL	6-8	345	Delta, B.C. (Canada)	Football North Canada
Davian Humphrey	LB	6-1	200	Chicago, IL	Phillips
Carlyun Neal	WR	5-11	180	Cincinnati, OH	Withrow
Le'Javier Payne	DB	5-8	170	Chicago, IL	Chicago Mt. Carmel
Jett Reese	LB	6-2	220	Chicago, IL	DePaul College Prep
Barron Sholl	DL	6-4	240	Rockford, IL	Boylan Central Catholic
Cale Kimbro	LB	6-1	205	Mattoon, IL	Mattoon
Brock VanDeveer	LB	6-1	210	Mahomet, IL	Mahomet-Seymour

== Schedule ==
Date	Time	Opponent	Site	TV	Result	Attendance
August 28	6:00 p.m.	Dayton*	O'Brien Field; Charleston, IL	ESPN+	W 24–14	6,775
September 6	12:00 p.m.	at Indiana State*	Memorial Stadium; Terre Haute, IN	ESPN+	L 14–38	5,281
September 13	2:00 p.m.	No. 7 Illinois State*	O'Brien Field; Charleston, IL (Mid-America Classic)	ESPN+	L 30–42	6,720
September 27	3:00 p.m.	at Western Illinois	Hanson Field; Macomb, IL	ESPN+	W 31–23	2,183
October 4	2:00 p.m.	Tennessee State	O'Brien Field; Charleston, IL	ESPN+	W 31–7	3,315
October 11	2:00 p.m.	Gardner–Webb^{†}	O'Brien Field; Charleston, IL	ESPN+	L 10–21	6,085
October 18	2:00 p.m.	at Southeast Missouri State	Houck Stadium; Cape Girardeau, MO	ESPN+	L 13–42	5,076
October 25	1:00 p.m.	at Charleston Southern	Buccaneer Field; North Charleston, SC	ESPN+	L 16–17	3,891
November 1	2:00 p.m.	UT Martin	O'Brien Field; Charleston, IL	ESPN+	L 20–27 ^{OT}	4,017
November 8	12:00 p.m.	No. 5 Tennessee Tech	O'Brien Field; Charleston, IL	ESPN+	L 9–21	2,266
November 15	2:00 p.m.	at Lindenwood	Harlen C. Hunter Stadium; St. Charles, MO	ESPN+	L 12–42	4,968
November 22	1:00 p.m.	at No. 10 (FBS) Alabama*	Bryant–Denny Stadium; Tuscaloosa, AL	SECN+/ESPN+	L 0–56	100,077
*Non-conference game; ^{†}Homecoming; Rankings from STATS Poll released prior to the game; All times are in Central time

== Game summaries ==
=== vs. Dayton ===
Game One – Dayton Flyers (0–0) at Eastern Illinois Panthers (0–0) – Game summary

Quarter	1	2	3	4	Total
Flyers	7	0	0	7	14
Panthers	0	3	7	14	24

at O'Brien Field • Charleston, IL

- Date: Saturday August 28, 2025
- Game time: 6:00 p.m.
- Game weather: Sunny, 80 °F (27 °C)
- Game attendance: 6.775
- Referee: Chris Brison
- TV announcers (ESPN+): Mike Bradd (play-by-play), Dave Kidwell (analyst) and Kaylee Unruh (sideline)

Game information

First quarter

- (9:55) DAY – Gavin Lochow 48 yard pass from Bryce Schondelmyer, Robby Smart kick (Drive: 6 plays, 70 yards, 3:02; DAY 7–0)

Second quarter

- (6:12) EIU – Drew Schiller 25 yard field goal (Drive: 11 plays, 62 yards, 5:24; DAY 7–3)

Third quarter

- (6:03) EIU – Cole LaCrue 11 yard run, Drew Schiller kick (Drive: 11 plays, 92 yards, 4:48; EIU 10–7)

Fourth quarter

- (10:26) EIU – Cole LaCrue 1 yard run, Drew Schiller kick (Drive: 4 plays, 52 yards, 1:43; EIU 17–7)
- (9:31) DAY – Michael Mussari 67 yard pass from Bryce Schondelmyer, Robby Smart kick (Drive: 2 plays, 76 yards, 0:49; EIU 17–14)
- (2:15) EIU – Cole LaCrue 6 yard run, Drew Schiller kick (Drive: 13 plays, 75 yards, 7:16; EIU 24–14)

Statistics	DAY	EIU
First downs	9	25
Total yards	292	465
Rushing yards	31	336
Passing yards	261	129
Passing: Comp–Att–Int	17–31–0	9–18–1
Time of possession	19:43	40:17

Team	Category	Player	Statistics
Dayton	Passing	Bryce Schondelmyer	17/31, 261 yards, 2 TD
Dayton	Rushing	Mason Hackett	8 carries, 24 yards
Dayton	Receiving	Gavin Lochow	6 receptions, 124 yards, 1 TD
Eastern Illinois	Passing	Cole LaCrue	9/17, 129 yards, 1 INT
Eastern Illinois	Rushing	Cole LaCrue	26 carries, 193 yards, 3 TD
Eastern Illinois	Receiving	DeAirious Smith	2 receptions, 58 yards

=== at Indiana State ===
Game Two – Eastern Illinois Panthers (1–0) at Indiana State Sycamores (1–0) – Game summary

Quarter	1	2	3	4	Total
Panthers	0	0	0	0	0
Sycamores	0	0	0	0	0

at Memorial Stadium • Terre Haute, IN

- Date: Saturday September 6, 2025
- Game time: 12:00 p.m.
- TV announcers (ESPN+): Joey O'Rourke (play-by-play) and Jim Leisure (analyst)

Game information

First quarter
Second quarter
Third quarter
Fourth quarter

Statistics	EIU	INST
First downs		
Total yards		
Rushing yards		
Passing yards		
Passing: Comp–Att–Int		
Time of possession		

Team	Category	Player	Statistics
Eastern Illinois	Passing		
Eastern Illinois	Rushing		
Eastern Illinois	Receiving		
Indiana State	Passing		
Indiana State	Rushing		
Indiana State	Receiving		

=== vs. No. 7 Illinois State (Mid-America Classic) ===
Game Three – Illinois State Redbirds (1–1) at Eastern Illinois Panthers (1–1) – Game summary

Quarter	1	2	3	4	Total
No. 7 Redbirds	7	14	7	14	42
Panthers	0	10	0	20	30

at Memorial Stadium • Champaign, IL

- Date: Saturday September 13, 2025
- Game time: 2:00 p.m.
- Game weather: • Temperature: 91 °F (33 °C) • Wind: S at 12 miles per hour (19 km/h)
- Game attendance: 6,720
- Referee: Drew Myers
- TV announcers (ESPN+): Mike Bradd (play-by-play), Dave Kidwell (analyst) and Kaylee Unruh (sideline)

Game information

First quarter

- ISU – Wenkers Wright 2–yard run (Matt Maldonado kick), 7:13. Redbirds 7–0. Drive: 8 plays, 59 yards, 3:26.

Second quarter

- ISU – Daniel Sobkowicz 10–yard pass from Tommy Rittenhouse (Maldonado kick), 13:49. Redbirds 14–0. Drive: 11 plays, 51 yards, 3:58.
- EIU – C J Nelson 75–yard pass from Connor Wolf (Drew Schiller kick), 13:30. Redbirds 14–7. Drive: 1 plays, 75 yards, 0:13.
- EIU – Schiller 43–yard field goal, 0:42. Redbirds 14–10. Drive: 7 plays, 17 yards, 2:40.
- ISU – Luke Mailander 46–yard pass from Rittenhouse (Maldonado kick), 0:08. Redbirds 21–10. Drive: 4 plays, 65 yards, 0:34.

Third quarter

- ISU – Wright 18–yard run (Maldonado kick), 7:21. Redbirds 28–10. Drive: 4 plays, 65 yards, 1:37.

Fourth quarter

- EIU – Cooper Willman 18–yard pass from Wolf (Schiller kick), 11:43. Redbirds 28–17. Drive: 7 plays, 92 yards, 2:58.
- EIU – Nelson 51–yard pass from Wolf (), 8:30. Redbirds 28–23. Drive: 3 plays, 74 yards, 1:20.
- ISU – Wright 16–yard run (Maldonado kick), 6:21. Redbirds 35–23. Drive: 5 plays, 64 yards, 2:00.
- ISU – Sobkowicz 22–yard pass from Rittenhouse (Maldonado kick), 3:14. Redbirds 42–23. Drive: 5 plays, 35 yards, 2:32.
- EIU – DeAirious Smith 9–yard pass from Wolf (Schiller kick), 1:47. Redbirds 42–30. Drive: 8 plays, 75 yards, 1:27.

Statistics	ILST	EIU
First downs	24	20
Total yards	485	446
Rushing yards	186	35
Passing yards	299	411
Passing: Comp–Att–Int	24–35–0	28–44–2
Time of possession	30:30	29:30

Team	Category	Player	Statistics
Illinois State	Passing	Tommy Rittenhouse	24/35, 299 yards, 3 TD
Illinois State	Rushing	Wenkers Wright	14 carries, 94 yards, 3 TD
Illinois State	Receiving	Luke Mailander	5 receptions, 109 yards, TD
Eastern Illinois	Passing	Connor Wolf	28/44, 411 yards, 4 TD, 2 INT
Eastern Illinois	Rushing	Charles Kellom	15 carries, 22 yards
Eastern Illinois	Receiving	CJ Nelson	7 receptions, 194 yards, 2 TD

=== at Western Illinois ===
Game Four – Eastern Illinois Panthers (1–2) at Western Illinois Leathernecks (1–3) – Game summary

Quarter	1	2	3	4	Total
Panthers	7	14	0	10	31
Leathernecks	0	6	10	7	23

at Hanson Field • Macomb, IL

- Date: Saturday September 27, 2025
- Game time: 3:00 p.m.
- TV announcers (ESPN+): Russ Eisenstein (play-by-play), Aiden Dersien (analyst) and Caden Strenz (sideline)

Game information

First quarter
Second quarter
Third quarter
Fourth quarter

Statistics	EIU	WIU
First downs		
Total yards		
Rushing yards		
Passing yards		
Passing: Comp–Att–Int		
Time of possession		

Team	Category	Player	Statistics
Eastern Illinois	Passing		
Eastern Illinois	Rushing		
Eastern Illinois	Receiving		
Western Illinois	Passing		
Western Illinois	Rushing		
Western Illinois	Receiving		

=== vs. Tennessee State ===
Game Five – Tennessee State Tigers (1–3) at Eastern Illinois Panthers (2–2) – Game summary

Quarter	1	2	3	4	Total
Tigers	0	0	0	7	7
Panthers	7	10	7	7	31

at O'Brien Field • Charleston, IL

- Date: Saturday October 4, 2025
- Game time: 2:00 p.m.
- TV announcers (ESPN+): Mike Bradd (play-by-play), Dave Kidwell (analyst) and Kaylee Unruh (sideline)

Game information

First quarter
Second quarter
Third quarter
Fourth quarter

Statistics	TNST	EIU
First downs		
Total yards		
Rushing yards		
Passing yards		
Passing: Comp–Att–Int		
Time of possession		

Team	Category	Player	Statistics
Tennessee State	Passing		
Tennessee State	Rushing		
Tennessee State	Receiving		
Eastern Illinois	Passing		
Eastern Illinois	Rushing		
Eastern Illinois	Receiving		

=== vs. Gardner–Webb ===
Game Six – Gardner–Webb Runnin' Bulldogs (3–2) at Eastern Illinois Panthers (3–2) – Game summary

Quarter	1	2	3	4	Total
Runnin' Bulldogs	7	14	0	0	21
Panthers	0	3	7	0	10

at O'Brien Field • Charleston, IL

- Date: Saturday October 11, 2025
- Game time: 2:00 p.m.
- TV announcers (ESPN+): TBA

Game information

First quarter
Second quarter
Third quarter
Fourth quarter

Statistics	GWEB	EIU
First downs		
Total yards		
Rushing yards		
Passing yards		
Passing: Comp–Att–Int		
Time of possession		

Team	Category	Player	Statistics
Gardner–Webb	Passing		
Gardner–Webb	Rushing		
Gardner–Webb	Receiving		
Eastern Illinois	Passing		
Eastern Illinois	Rushing		
Eastern Illinois	Receiving		

=== at Southeast Missouri State ===
Game Seven – Eastern Illinois Panthers (3–3) at Southeast Missouri State Redhawks (2–4) – Game summary

Quarter	1	2	3	4	Total
Panthers	0	0	0	0	0
Redhawks	0	0	0	0	0

at Houck Stadium • Cape Girardeau, MO

- Date: Saturday October 18, 2025
- Game time: 2:00 p.m.
- TV announcers (ESPN+): TBA

Game information

First quarter
Second quarter
Third quarter
Fourth quarter

Statistics	EIU	SEMO
First downs		
Total yards		
Rushing yards		
Passing yards		
Passing: Comp–Att–Int		
Time of possession		

Team	Category	Player	Statistics
Eastern Illinois	Passing		
Eastern Illinois	Rushing		
Eastern Illinois	Receiving		
Southeast Missouri State	Passing		
Southeast Missouri State	Rushing		
Southeast Missouri State	Receiving		

=== at Charleston Southern ===
Game Eight – Eastern Illinois Panthers (3–4) at Charleston Southern Buccaneers (2–6) – Game summary

Quarter	1	2	3	4	Total
Panthers	0	0	0	0	0
Buccaneers	0	0	0	0	0

at Buccaneer Field • North Charleston, SC

- Date: Saturday October 25, 2025
- Game time: 1:00 p.m.
- TV announcers (ESPN+): TBA

Game information

First quarter
Second quarter
Third quarter
Fourth quarter

Statistics	EIU	CHSO
First downs		
Total yards		
Rushing yards		
Passing yards		
Passing: Comp–Att–Int		
Time of possession		

Team	Category	Player	Statistics
Eastern Illinois	Passing		
Eastern Illinois	Rushing		
Eastern Illinois	Receiving		
Charleston Southern	Passing		
Charleston Southern	Rushing		
Charleston Southern	Receiving		

=== vs. UT Martin ===
Game Nine – UT Martin Skyhawks (3–5) at Eastern Illinois Panthers (3–5) – Game summary

Quarter	1	2	3	4	Total
Skyhawks	0	0	0	0	0
Panthers	0	0	0	0	0

at O'Brien Field • Charleston, IL

- Date: Saturday November 1, 2025
- Game time: 2:00 p.m.
- TV announcers (ESPN+): TBA

Game information

First quarter
Second quarter
Third quarter
Fourth quarter

Statistics	UTM	EIU
First downs		
Total yards		
Rushing yards		
Passing yards		
Passing: Comp–Att–Int		
Time of possession		

Team	Category	Player	Statistics
UT Martin	Passing		
UT Martin	Rushing		
UT Martin	Receiving		
Eastern Illinois	Passing		
Eastern Illinois	Rushing		
Eastern Illinois	Receiving		

=== vs. No. 5 Tennessee Tech ===
Game Ten – No. 5 Tennessee Tech Golden Eagles (9–0) at Eastern Illinois Panthers (3–6) – Game summary

Quarter	1	2	3	4	Total
No. 5 Golden Eagles	0	0	0	0	0
Panthers	0	0	0	0	0

at O'Brien Field • Charleston, IL

- Date: Saturday November 8, 2025
- Game time: 12:00 p.m.
- TV announcers (ESPN+): TBA

Game information

First quarter
Second quarter
Third quarter
Fourth quarter

Statistics	TNTC	EIU
First downs		
Total yards		
Rushing yards		
Passing yards		
Passing: Comp–Att–Int		
Time of possession		

Team	Category	Player	Statistics
Tennessee Tech	Passing		
Tennessee Tech	Rushing		
Tennessee Tech	Receiving		
Eastern Illinois	Passing		
Eastern Illinois	Rushing		
Eastern Illinois	Receiving		

=== at Lindenwood ===
Game Eleven – Eastern Illinois Panthers (0–0) at Lindenwood Lions (0–0) – Game summary

Quarter	1	2	3	4	Total
Panthers	0	0	0	0	0
ions	0	0	0	0	0

at Harlen C. Hunter Stadium • St. Charles, MO

- Date: Saturday November 15, 2025
- Game time: 2:00 p.m.
- TV announcers (ESPN+): TBA

Game information

First quarter
Second quarter
Third quarter
Fourth quarter

Statistics	EIU	LIN
First downs		
Total yards		
Rushing yards		
Passing yards		
Passing: Comp–Att–Int		
Time of possession		

Team	Category	Player	Statistics
Eastern Illinois	Passing		
Eastern Illinois	Rushing		
Eastern Illinois	Receiving		
Lindenwood	Passing		
Lindenwood	Rushing		
Lindenwood	Receiving		

=== at No. 10 (FBS) Alabama ===
Game Twelve – Eastern Illinois Panthers (3–8) at No. 10 (FBS) Alabama Crimson Tide (8–2) – Game summary

Quarter	1	2	3	4	Total
Panthers	0	0	0	0	0
No. 10 (FBS) Crimson Tide	14	14	14	14	56

at Bryant–Denny Stadium • Tuscaloosa, AL

- Date: Saturday November 22, 2025
- Game time: 2:00 p.m.
- Game weather: Sunny, 77 °F (25 °C)
- Game attendance: 100,077
- Referee: Lee Hedrick
- TV announcers (SECN+/ESPN+): Jay Alter (play-by-play), Rocky Boiman (analyst) and Tori Petry (sideline)

Game information

First quarter

- ALA - Jam Miller 1-yard run (Conor Talty kick), 9:45. Crimson Tide 7-0. Drive: 8 plays, 46 yards, 3:09.
- ALA - Daniel Hill 7-yard run (Conor Talty kick), 4:49. Crimson Tide 14-0. Drive: 5 plays, 38 yards, 2:43.

Second quarter

- ALA - Kevin Riley 1-yard run (Conor Talty kick), 10:04. Crimson Tide 21-0. Drive: 8 plays, 64 yards, 4:48.
- ALA - Kevin Riley 2-yard run (Peter Notaro kick), 1:05. Crimson Tide 28-0. Drive: 9 plays, 69 yards, 4:16.

Third quarter

- ALA - AK Dear 1-yard run (Conor Talty kick), 11:03. Crimson Tide 35-0. Drive: 8 plays, 59 yards, 3:53.
- ALA - Austin Mack 20-yard run (Conor Talty Kick), 1:05. Crimson Tide 42-0. Drive: 2 plays, 40 yards, 0:47.

Fourth quarter

- ALA - Richard Young 2-yard run (Reid Schuback kick), 7:34. Crimson Tide 49-0. Drive: 13 plays, 65 yards, 6:45.
- ALA - AK Dear 5-yard run (Tucker Cornelius kick), 1:15. Crimson Tide 56-0. Drive: 7 plays, 53 yards, 3:41.

Statistics	EIU	ALA
First downs	2	32
Total yards	34	539
Rushing yards	14	269
Passing yards	20	270
Passing: Comp–Att–Int	4–9–1	23–30–2
Time of possession	21:51	38:09

Team	Category	Player	Statistics
Eastern Illinois	Passing	Connor Wolf	4/8, 20 yards
Eastern Illinois	Rushing	Charles Kellom	14 carries, 25 yards
Eastern Illinois	Receiving	Landers Green	1 reception, 15 yards
Alabama	Passing	Ty Simpson	11/16, 147 yards, 2 INT
Alabama	Rushing	Jam Miller	11 carries, 62 yards, TD
Alabama	Receiving	Jaylen Mbakwe	2 receptions, 39 yards
