= Toriano Morgan =

American football coach (born c. 1978)

Current position
- Title: Co-offensive coordinator & running backs coach
- Team: Tennessee State
- Conference: OVC–Big South

Biographical details
- Born: c. 1978 (age 47–48); Fort Lauderdale, Florida, U.S.
- Education: Tennessee State University (2000, 2002)

Playing career
- 1997–2000: Tennessee State
- Position: Wide receiver

Coaching career (HC unless noted)
- 2002–2003: Tennessee State (GA)
- 2004–2005: Boyd H. Anderson HS (FL) (assistant)
- 2006–2010: Boyd H. Anderson HS (FL) (OC)
- 2011–2013: McArthur HS (FL) (AHC/OC)
- 2014–2017: Virginia Union (AHC/OC)
- 2018: Dillard HS (FL)
- 2019–2020: Virginia State (AHC/OC/QB)
- 2021–2024: Edward Waters
- 2025–present: Tennessee State (co-OC/RB)

Head coaching record
- Overall: 18–24 (college); 8–3 (high school)

Toriano J. Morgan (born c. 1978) is an American college football coach. He is the co-offensive coordinator and running backs coach for the Tennessee State Tigers, a position he has held since 2025. He was previously the head football coach for Edward Waters University from 2021 to 2024. He previously was the head coach for Dillard High School in 2018. He also coached for Tennessee State, Boyd H. Anderson High School, McArthur High School, Virginia Union, and Virginia State. He played college football for Tennessee State as a wide receiver.

== Head coaching record ==
=== College ===
Year	Team	Overall	Conference	Standing	Bowl/playoffs
Edward Waters Tigers (Southern Intercollegiate Athletic Conference) (2021–2024)
2021	Edward Waters	4–7			
2022	Edward Waters	5–6	4–3	4th (East)	
2023	Edward Waters	6–4	5–3	T–6th	
2024	Edward Waters	3–7	3–5	T–9th	
Edward Waters:		18–24	12–11		
Total:		19–24			

=== High school ===
Year	Team	Overall	Conference	Standing	Bowl/playoffs
Dillard Panthers () (2018)
2018	Dillard	8–3	4–0	1st	
Dillard:		8–3	4–0		
Total:		8–3			
National championship Conference title Conference division title or championship game berth
