= Jalen Bell =

American gridiron football player (born 2001)

- Bell with Toronto Argonauts in 2026

No. 93 – Toronto Argonauts
- Position: Defensive lineman
- Roster status: Active
- CFL status: American

Personal information
- Born: November 1, 2001 (age 25)
- Listed height: 5 ft 11 in (1.80 m)
- Listed weight: 280 lb (127 kg)

Career information
- High school: Martin Luther King Jr. (Detroit, Michigan)
- College: Mississippi Valley State (2019–2022); Tennessee State (2023–2024); Memphis (2025)
- NFL draft: 2026: undrafted

Career history
- Toronto Argonauts (2026–present)
- Stats at CFL.ca

Jalen Bell (born November 1, 2001) is an American professional football defensive lineman for the Toronto Argonauts of the Canadian Football League (CFL). He played college football for the Mississippi Valley State Delta Devils, Tennessee State Tigers and Memphis Tigers.

== Early life ==
Bell was born on November 1, 2001. He attended Martin Luther King Jr. Senior High School in Detroit, Michigan. Bell committed to play college football at University of Akron but flipped to Mississippi Valley State University after a coaching change.

== College career ==
Bell played college football for the Mississippi Valley State Delta Devils from 2019 to 2022, Tennessee State Tigers from 2023 to 2024 and Memphis Tigers in 2025. In 30 games at Mississippi Valley State, he had 113 tackles, including 26.5 for loss, 12 sacks, forced forced fumbles and four fumble recoveries.

On January 16, 2023, Bell transferred to Tennessee State University. In his first season, he suffered an injury in the opener and missed the rest of the year. In 2024, Bell played in four games, recording 24 tackles, with seven for loss and 2.5 sacks.

Bell transferred again to University of Memphis for the 2025 season where he played in all 13 games with 12 starts. He had 36 tackles, including 5.5 for loss, two sacks and one interception.

== Professional career ==
Pre-draft measurables
Height	Weight	Arm length	Hand span	Wingspan	40-yard dash	10-yard split	20-yard split	20-yard shuttle	Three-cone drill	Vertical jump	Broad jump	Bench press
5 ft 11 in (1.80 m)	255 lb (116 kg)	31 5/8 in (0.80 m)	9 1/8 in (0.23 m)	6 ft 2 in (1.88 m)	5.06 s	1.78 s	2.82 s	4.78 s	7.38 s	26.5 in (0.67 m)	8 ft 2 in (2.49 m)	19 reps
All values from Pro day

After not being selected in the 2026 NFL draft, Toomer signed with the Toronto Argonauts of the Canadian Football League (CFL). He made his CFL debut in the opener against the Montreal Alouettes but made his first tackle the following week against the Ottawa Redblacks. On July 21, Bell was signed to the practice roster. On August 28, he was elevated to the active roster against the Saskatchewan Roughriders and had two tackles. Bell reverted to the practice roster the following week. On October 15, he was promoted to the active roster. Against the 0–16 Redblacks, Bell rushed for a two-point conversion for the go-ahead score but the Argonauts ended up losing, 39–40.
