= Harlen C. Hunter Stadium =

Stadium in Missouri

Coordinates: 38.7866°N 90.5019°W

Hunter Stadium

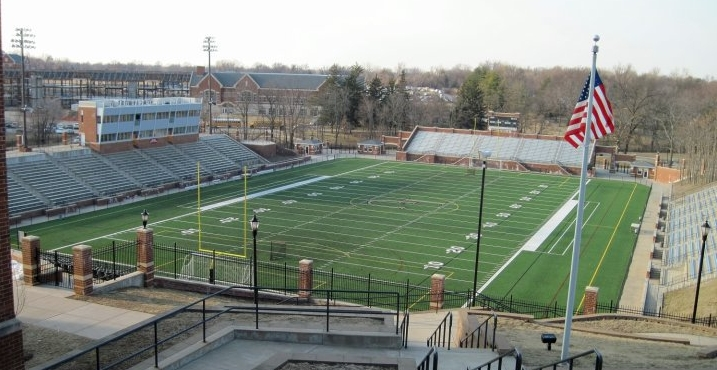
- View of the stadium in 2010
- Interactive map of Hunter Stadium
- Full name: Harlen C. Hunter Stadium
- Address: United States
- Owner: Lindenwood University
- Operator: Lindenwood Athletics
- Capacity: 7,450
- Type: Stadium
- Surface: Enviroturf (2009–present); Astro Play (1999–2009) artificial turf (1976–1999)
- Current use: Football; Soccer; Lacrosse; Rugby

Construction
- Opened: 1976; 50 years ago
- Architect: Shaver Partnership
- Main contractors: Glosier Construction Company; Western Waterproofing Company; Blanton Construction (2005 expansion)

Tenants
- Lindenwood Lions (NCAA) teams: football, men's and women's soccer, lacrosse, men's and women's rugby

Harlen C. Hunter Stadium, or Hunter Stadium, is an outdoor 7,450-seat multi-purpose stadium located on the campus of Lindenwood University in St. Charles, Missouri.

The stadium serves as home for Lindenwood Lions football, men's and women's soccer, men's and women's lacrosse programs, and men's and women's rugby. It is located in the north-central part of campus.

== History ==
Hunter Stadium was built in 1976 by the St. Louis Cardinals NFL Football Team as a training camp location. The stadium was the site of the 1978 Class 4-A Missouri State High School Football Championship game between Jefferson City and Hazelwood Central.

The stadium was renovated in 1988. It is named after Dr. Harlen C. Hunter who founded the St. Louis Orthopedic Sports Medicine Clinic in Chesterfield in 1979, and made key monetary contributions for the upgrades of the playing surface in 1988.

After the 2004 season, Hunter Stadium received a renovation that included new end-zone seating, a brand new two-story press box with luxury boxes and a new concession area. In 2009, the playing surface at the facility was replaced with Enviroturf.

== Special events ==
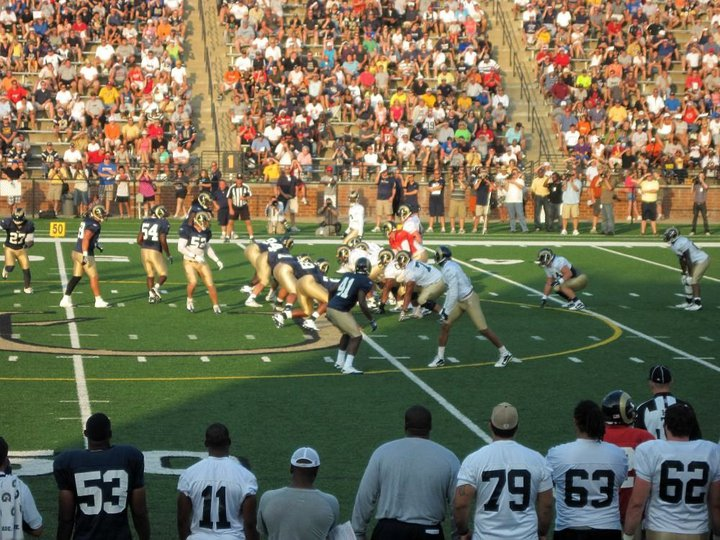
2010 St. Louis Rams scrimmage

The facility has hosted NAIA National Football Championship playoff games in 2004, 2008, and 2010; as well as the NAIA National Women's Soccer Championship in 2001 and 2002.

The stadium has hosted pre-season scrimmage games for the St. Louis Rams in 2000, 2009 and 2010. On August 7, 2010, one of the largest crowds in the stadium history, estimated over 8,000, turned out to see the Rams training camp scrimmage that included Rams rookie quarterback Sam Bradford, the first overall pick in the 2010 NFL draft.

In 2019, the stadium hosted a U.S. Open Cup Fourth Round match featuring Saint Louis FC of the USL Championship and Chicago Fire of Major League Soccer. The match was moved from STL FC's home field World Wide Technology Soccer Park because of flooding.
