= 2025 Southern Illinois Salukis football team =

American college football season

2025 Southern Illinois Salukis football
- Conference: Missouri Valley Football Conference

Ranking
- STATS: No. 25
- Record: 7–5 (4–4 MVFC)
- Head coach: Nick Hill (10th season)
- Defensive coordinator: Lee Pronschinske (1st season)
- Home stadium: Saluki Stadium

2025 Missouri Valley Football Conference standings
	Conf.			Overall
Team	W		L	W		L
No. 4т North Dakota State $^	8	–	0	12	–	1
No. 9 South Dakota ^	6	–	2	10	–	5
No. 2 Illinois State ^	5	–	3	12	–	5
No. 14 North Dakota ^	5	–	3	8	–	6
No. 18 Youngstown State ^	5	–	3	8	–	5
No. 13 South Dakota State ^	4	–	4	9	–	5
No. 25 Southern Illinois	4	–	4	7	–	5
Northern Iowa	1	–	7	3	–	9
Murray State	1	–	7	1	–	11
Indiana State	1	–	7	3	–	9
$ – Conference champion; ^ – FCS playoff participant; Rankings from STATS Poll

The 2025 Southern Illinois Salukis football team represented Southern Illinois University Carbondale as a member of the Missouri Valley Football Conference (MVFC) during the 2025 NCAA Division I FCS football season. The Salukis were led by tenth-year head coach Nick Hill, and played their home games at Saluki Stadium in Carbondale, Illinois.

== Preseason ==
=== MVFC poll ===
The Missouri Valley Football Conference released its preseason poll on July 21, 2025, voted on by league athletic directors, coaches, and media members. The Salukis were predicted to finish sixth in the conference.

== Transfers ==
=== Outgoing ===
Player	Position	Destination
Allen Middleton	WR	Bowling Green
Jamond Mathis	DE	Kent State
Jamir Conn	DB	Nebraska
Ross Pedro	LS	Northern Illinois
Keontez Lewis	WR	Oklahoma
Desman Hearns	DB	Wyoming

=== Incoming ===
Player	Position	Previous school
Jackson Parker	WR	Albany
Jacob Katauskas	OL	Coastal Carolina
Blayne Sisson	WR	Illinois
Fabian McCray	WR	Jackson State
Antonio Ross Jr.	OL	Jackson State
Donnie Wingate	DE	Lindenwood
Ryan Algrim	LS	Minnesota
Matthew McClelland	DB	Morehead State
Dashaun Gibson	DB	Northern Illinois
Kyle Thomas	WR	Northern Illinois
Ty Walls	WR	Oklahoma State
Bernadin Fleurima Jr.	DT	Robert Morris
Naz Hill	DB	Wyoming

== Schedule ==
Date	Time	Opponent	Rank	Site	TV	Result	Attendance
August 30	6:00 p.m.	Thomas More*	No. 20	Saluki Stadium; Carbondale, IL	ESPN+	W 49–3	6,585
September 6	6:30 p.m.	at Purdue*	No. 14	Ross–Ade Stadium; West Lafayette, IN	BTN	L 17–34	54,663
September 13	6:00 p.m.	at UT Martin*	No. 17	Graham Stadium; Martin, TN	ESPN+	W 37–10	5,402
September 20	6:00 p.m.	at Southeast Missouri State*	No. 13	Houck Stadium; Cape Girardeau, MO	ESPN+	W 59–31	8,050
October 4	6:00 p.m.	Indiana State	No. 10	Saluki Stadium; Carbondale, IL	ESPN+	W 55–27	10,132
October 11	2:30 p.m.	at No. 1 North Dakota State	No. 8	Fargodome; Fargo, ND	ESPN+	L 17–45	15,812
October 18	12:00 p.m.	No. 9 North Dakota	No. 12	Saluki Stadium; Carbondale, IL	ESPN+	L 19–38	5,132
October 25	2:00 p.m.	Northern Iowa^{†}	No. 16	Saluki Stadium; Carbondale, IL	ESPN+	W 31–17	8,115
November 1	4:00 p.m.	at Murray State	No. 16	Roy Stewart Stadium; Murray, KY	ESPN+	W 27–7	8,506
November 8	1:00 p.m.	at No. 21 Youngstown State	No. 15	Stambaugh Stadium; Youngstown, OH	ESPN+	L 38–48	8,448
November 15	12:00 p.m.	No. 17 South Dakota	No. 21	Saluki Stadium; Carbondale, IL	ESPN+	L 51–53 ^{5OT}	5,622
November 22	12:00 p.m.	at No. 11 Illinois State	No. 24	Hancock Stadium; Normal, IL	ESPN+	W 37–7	6,895
*Non-conference game; ^{†}Homecoming; Rankings from STATS Poll released prior to the game; All times are in Central time

== Game summaries ==
All times are Central time.

=== Thomas More (DII) ===
Thomas More Saints (DII) (0–0) at No. 20 Southern Illinois Salukis (0–0) – Game summary

Quarter	1	2	3	4	Total
Saints (DII)	0	3	0	0	3
No. 20 Salukis	7	21	7	14	49

at Saluki Stadium, Carbondale, IL

- Date: August 30, 2025
- Game time: 6:00 p.m.
- Game weather: Sunny
- Game attendance: 6,585
- Referee: Tyler Downs
- TV: ESPN+

Game information
First quarter
- (11:11) SIU – DJ Williams 10-yard run, Paul Geelen kick (Drive: 8 plays, 69 yards, 3:44; Southern Illinois 7–0)

Second quarter

- (11:51) SIU – Jay Jones 18-yard pass from DJ Williams, Paul Geelen kick (Drive: 13 plays, 73 yards, 6:05; Southern Illinois 14–0)
- (6:40) SIU – Jackson Parker 17-yard pass from DJ Williams, Paul Geelen kick (Drive: 4 plays, 50 yards, 1:25; Southern Illinois 21–0)
- (2:15) THO – Luke Iden 29-yard field goal (Drive: 9 plays, 64 yards, 4:19; Southern Illinois 21–3)
- (0:00) SIU – Lem Wash 1-yard run, Paul Geelen kick (Drive: 8 plays, 48 yards, 1:12; Southern Illinois 28–3)

Third quarter

- (9:55) SIU – Fabian McCray 17-yard pass from DJ Williams, Paul Geelen kick (Drive: 3 plays, 55 yards, 1:18; Southern Illinois 35–3)

Fourth quarter

- (10:40) SIU – David Obadein 5-yard interception, Paul Geelen kick (Southern Illinois 42–3)
- (7:28) SIU – Quade Chatmon 3-yard run, Tanner Trachsel kick (Drive: 5 plays, 24 yards, 2:29; Southern Illinois 49–3)

Statistics	THO	SIU
First downs	13	24
Total yards	191	386
Rushing yards	60	148
Passing yards	131	238
Passing: Comp–Att–Int	18–29–2	20–29–0
Time of possession	33:12	26:48

Team	Category	Player	Statistics
Thomas More	Passing	Griffin Scalf	16/23, 98 yards, INT
Thomas More	Rushing	Eli White	12 carries, 33 yards
Thomas More	Receiving	Brook Harris	2 receptions, 33 yards
Southern Illinois	Passing	DJ Williams	18/24, 227 yards, 3 TD
Southern Illinois	Rushing	Shaun Lester Jr.	8 carries, 39 yards
Southern Illinois	Receiving	Vinson Davis III	6 receptions, 97 yards

=== at Purdue (FBS) ===
No. 14 Southern Illinois Salukis (1–0) at Purdue Boilermakers (FBS) (1–0) – Game summary

Quarter	1	2	3	4	Total
No. 14 Salukis	14	0	0	3	17
Boilermakers (FBS)	14	10	3	7	34

at Ross–Ade Stadium, West Lafayette, Indiana

- Date: September 6, 2025
- Game time: 7:30 p.m.
- Game weather: Sunny • Temperature: 65 °F (18 °C) • Wind: 0 miles per hour (0 km/h)
- Game attendance: 54,663
- Referee: Francisco Villar
- TV announcers (BTN): Mark Followill, Anthony Herron, and Dannie Rogers

Game information
First quarter
- (10:29) SIU – DJ Williams 7-yard run, Paul Geelen kick (Drive: 10 plays, 75 yards, 4:31; Southern Illinois 7–0)
- (6:34) PUR – Arhmad Branch 13-yard pass from Ryan Browne, Spencer Porath kick (Drive: 9 plays, 72 yards, 3:49; Tied 7–7)
- (5:08) SIU – Ryan Schwendeman 4-yard pass from DJ Williams, Paul Geelen kick (Drive: 3 plays, 75 yards, 1:26; Southern Illinois 14–7)
- (1:33) PUR – Nitro Tuggle 29-yard pass from Ryan Browne, Spencer Porath kick (Drive: 8 plays, 76 yards, 3:31; Tied 14–14)

Second quarter

- (10:41) PUR – Spencer Porath 25-yard field goal (Drive: 9 plays, 52 yards, 4:15; Purdue 17–14)
- (1:21) PUR – Devin Mockobee 1-yard run, Spencer Porath kick (Drive: 12 plays, 55 yards, 5:00; Purdue 24–14)

Third quarter

- (6:15) PUR – Spencer Porath 43-yard field goal (Drive: 10 plays, 23 yards, 4:57; Purdue 27–14)

Fourth quarter

- (11:48) PUR – Devin Mockobee 1-yard run, Spencer Porath kick (Drive: 13 plays, 70 yards, 7:10; Purdue 34–14)
- (7:41) SIU – Paul Geelen 53-yard field goal (Drive: 10 plays, 40 yards, 4:07; Purdue 34–17)

Statistics	SIU	PUR
First downs	20	29
Total yards	283	384
Rushing yards	81	214
Passing yards	202	170
Passing: Comp–Att–Int	20–34–0	14–23–1
Turnovers	0	1
Time of possession	23:14	36:46

Team	Category	Player	Statistics
Southern Illinois	Passing	DJ Williams	20/33, 202 yards, TD
Southern Illinois	Rushing	Vinson Davis III	2 carries, 22 yards
Southern Illinois	Receiving	Fabian McCray	2 receptions, 72 yards
Purdue	Passing	Ryan Browne	14/23, 170 yards, 2 TD, INT
Purdue	Rushing	Devin Mockobee	32 carries, 126 yards, 2 TD
Purdue	Receiving	George Burhenn	3 receptions, 48 yards

=== at UT Martin ===
No. 17 Southern Illinois Salukis (1–1) at UT Martin Skyhawks (0–2) – Game summary

Quarter	1	2	3	4	Total
No. 17 Salukis	7	10	13	7	37
Skyhawks	0	7	3	0	10

at Graham Stadium, Martin, TN

- Date: September 13, 2025
- Game time: 6:00 p.m.
- Game weather: Sunny • Temperature: 91 °F (33 °C) • Wind: SW at 5 miles per hour (8.0 km/h)
- Game attendance: 5,402
- Referee: Brandon McCain
- TV: ESPN+

Game information
First quarter
- (11:35) SIU – DJ Williams 4-yard run, Paul Geelen kick (Drive: 3 plays, 60 yards, 1:31; Southern Illinois 7–0)

Second quarter

- (11:07) SIU – Fabian McCray 56-yard pass from DJ Williams, Paul Geelen kick (Drive: 5 plays, 73 yards, 3:09; Southern Illinois 14–0)
- (2:43) UTM – Drake Martinez 2-yard pass from Jase Bauer, Cade Hechter kick (Drive: 11 plays, 69 yards, 6:24; Southern Illinois 14–7)
- (0:00) SIU – Paul Geelen 28-yard field goal (Drive: 4 plays, 59 yards, 0:30; Southern Illinois 17–7)

Third quarter

- (11:32) SIU – DJ Williams 13-yard run, Paul Geelen kick (Drive: 7 plays, 58 yards, 3:22; Southern Illinois 24–7)
- (5:34) UTM – Cade Hechter 33-yard field goal (Drive: 9 plays, 60 yards, 5:58; Southern Illinois 24–10)
- (2:53) SIU – DJ Williams 12-yard run (Drive: 3 plays, 60 yards, 1:31; Southern Illinois 30–10)

Fourth quarter

- (1:51) SIU – Chandler Chapman 44-yard run, Paul Geelen kick (Drive: 6 plays, 75 yards, 3:14; Southern Illinois 37–10)

Statistics	SIU	UTM
First downs	22	16
Total yards	490	291
Rushing yards	273	113
Passing yards	217	178
Passing: Comp–Att–Int	13–18–2	23–32–1
Time of possession	29:05	30:55

Team	Category	Player	Statistics
Southern Illinois	Passing	DJ Williams	13/18, 217 yards, TD, 2 INT
Southern Illinois	Rushing	DJ Williams	14 carries, 128 yards, 3 TD
Southern Illinois	Receiving	Jay Jones	4 receptions, 65 yards
UT Martin	Passing	Jase Bauer	22/29, 173 yards, TD
UT Martin	Rushing	Jase Bauer	9 carries, 52 yards
UT Martin	Receiving	Bryce Bailey	6 receptions, 70 yards

=== at Southeast Missouri State ===
No. 13 Southern Illinois Salukis (2–1) at Southeast Missouri State Redhawks (1–2) – Game summary

Quarter	1	2	3	4	Total
No. 13 Salukis	14	17	21	7	59
Redhawks	7	0	17	7	31

at Houck Stadium, Cape Girardeau, MO

- Date: September 20, 2025
- Game time: 6:00 p.m.
- Game weather: Cloudy • Temperature: 87 °F (31 °C)
- Game attendance: 8,050
- Referee: Gabe Tomlin
- TV: ESPN+

Game information
First quarter
- (14:46) SIU – DJ Williams 75-yard run, Paul Geelen kick (Drive: 1 play, 75 yards, 0:14; Southern Illinois 7–0)
- (12:28) SIU – Shaun Lester Jr. 3-yard run, Paul Geelen kick (Drive: 2 plays, 5 yards, 0:43; Southern Illinois 14–0)
- (8:00) SEMO – Jax Leatherwood 7-yard run, Justin Keller kick (Drive: 12 plays, 77 yards, 4:23; Southern Illinois 14–7)

Second quarter

- (11:17) SIU – DJ Williams 4-yard run, Paul Geelen kick (Drive: 6 plays, 45 yards, 2:47; Southern Illinois 21–7)
- (3:20) SIU – Vinson Davis III 17-yard pass from DJ Williams, Paul Geelen kick (Drive: 9 plays, 94 yards, 4:04; Southern Illinois 28–7)
- (0:00) SIU – Paul Geelen 32-yard field goal (Drive: 9 plays, 53 yards, 1:34; Southern Illinois 31–7)

Third quarter

- (12:13) SEMO – Cam Pedro 22-yard pass from Jax Leatherwood, Justin Keller kick (Drive: 8 plays, 79 yards, 2:41; Southern Illinois 31–14)
- (11:27) SIU – Fabian McCray 14-yard pass from DJ Williams, Paul Geelen kick (Drive: 2 plays, 75 yards, 0:41; Southern Illinois 38–14)
- (6:03) SEMO – Justin Keller 28-yard field goal (Drive: 10 plays, 65 yards, 5:24; Southern Illinois 38–17)
- (4:43) SIU – Vinson Davis III 69-yard pass from DJ Williams, Paul Geelen kick (Drive: 3 plays, 75 yards, 1:20; Southern Illinois 45–17)
- (2:23) SEMO – Cole Ruble 2-yard run, Justin Keller kick (Drive: 8 plays, 75 yards, 2:20; Southern Illinois 45–24)
- (0:00) SIU – Jay Jones 18-yard pass from DJ Williams, Paul Geelen kick (Drive: 4 plays, 75 yards, 2:23; Southern Illinois 52–24)

Fourth quarter

- (5:02) SIU – Shaun Lester Jr. 42-yard run, Paul Geelen kick (Drive: 8 plays, 69 yards, 5:27; Southern Illinois 59–24)
- (2:41) SEMO – Brandon Epton, Jr. 34-yard pass from Jax Leatherwood, Justin Keller kick (Drive: 7 plays, 75 yards, 2:21; Southern Illinois 59–31)

Statistics	SIU	SEMO
First downs	22	34
Total yards	612	569
Rushing yards	270	147
Passing yards	342	422
Passing: Comp–Att–Int	18–25–0	33–47–1
Time of possession	26:41	33:19

Team	Category	Player	Statistics
Southern Illinois	Passing	DJ Williams	18/25, 342 yards, 4 TD
Southern Illinois	Rushing	DJ Williams	10 carries, 164 yards, 2 TD
Southern Illinois	Receiving	Vinson Davis III	8 receptions, 185 yards, 2 TD
Southeast Missouri State	Passing	Jax Leatherwood	33/47, 422 yards, 2 TD, INT
Southeast Missouri State	Rushing	Brandon Epton, Jr.	18 carries, 94 yards
Southeast Missouri State	Receiving	Kalvin Gilbert	7 receptions, 125 yards

=== Indiana State ===
Indiana State Sycamores (2–2) vs. No. 10 Southern Illinois Salukis (3–1) – Game summary

Quarter	1	2	3	4	Total
Sycamores	7	7	6	7	27
No. 10 Salukis	21	17	7	10	55

at Saluki Stadium, Carbondale, IL

- Date: October 4, 2025
- Game time: 6:00 p.m.
- Game weather: Sunny • Temperature: 78 °F (26 °C) • Wind: NW at 8 miles per hour (13 km/h)
- Game attendance: 10,132
- Referee: David Hergert
- TV announcers (ESPN+): Larry Larson (play-by-play) and Kerry Martin (analyst)

Game information
First quarter
- (14:06) SIU – Jay Jones 20-yard pass from DJ Williams, Paul Geelen kick (Drive: 4 plays, 75 yards, 0:54; Southern Illinois 7–0)
- (9:58) SIU – Chandler Chapman 39-yard run, Paul Geelen kick (Drive: 6 plays, 76 yards, 2:57; Southern Illinois 14–0)
- (7:00) SIU – DJ Williams 1-yard run, Paul Geelen kick (Drive: 4 plays, 69 yards, 2:15; Southern Illinois 21–0)
- (2:40) INST – Keegan Patterson 9-yard run, Sebastian Lopez kick (Drive: 11 plays, 75 yards, 4:20; Southern Illinois 21–7)

Second quarter

- (13:28) SIU – Paul Geelen 4-yard field goal (Drive: 11 plays, 53 yards, 4:12; Southern Illinois 24–7)
- (9:36) SIU – Vinson Davis III 83-yard pass from DJ Williams, Paul Geelen kick (Drive: 3 plays, 89 yards, 0:49; Southern Illinois 31–7)
- (8:24) INST – Nick Osho 39-yard run, Sebastian Lopez kick (Drive: 3 plays, 75 yards, 1:12; Southern Illinois 31–14)
- (0:08) SIU – DJ Williams 3-yard run, Paul Geelen kick (Drive: 10 plays, 68 yards 1:47; Southern Illinois 38–14)

Third quarter

- (3:58) INST – Nick Osho 66-yard run, Brock Riddle conversion pass failed (Drive: 7 plays, 92 yards, 2:13; Southern Illinois 38–20)
- (0:34) SIU – Chandler Chapman 5-yard run, Paul Geelen kick (Drive: 6 plays, 31 yards, 3:20; Southern Illinois 45–20)

Fourth quarter

- (12:19) SIU – Paul Geelen 33-yard field goal (Drive: 6 plays, 8 yards, 2:35; Southern Illinois 48–20)
- (10:22) SIU – Eddie Robinson 81-yard run, Paul Geelen kick (Drive: 2 plays, 81 yards, 0:18; Southern Illinois 55–20)
- (2:05) INST – Brock Riddle 14-yard run, Sebastian Lopez kick (Drive: 9 plays, 65 yards, 3:25; Southern Illinois 55–27)

Statistics	INST	SIU
First downs	23	25
Total yards	446	656
Rushing yards	322	430
Passing yards	124	226
Passing: Comp–Att–Int	13–26–1	19–34–0
Time of possession	30:04	29:56

Team	Category	Player	Statistics
Indiana State	Passing	Brock Riddle	7/17, 80 yards, INT
Indiana State	Rushing	Nick Osho	28 carries, 213 yards, 2 TD
Indiana State	Receiving	Zack Drawdy Jr.	4 receptions, 58 yards
Southern Illinois	Passing	DJ Williams	19/31, 226 yards, 2 TD
Southern Illinois	Rushing	Edward Robinson	9 carries, 124 yards, TD
Southern Illinois	Receiving	Vinson Davis III	7 receptions, 140 yards, TD

=== at No. 1 North Dakota State ===
No. 8 Southern Illinois Salukis (4–1) vs. No. 1 North Dakota State Bison (5–0) – Game summary

Quarter	1	2	3	4	Total
No. 8 Salukis	3	7	0	7	17
No. 1 Bison	7	10	14	14	45

at Fargodome, Fargo, ND

- Date: October 11, 2025
- Game time: 2:30 p.m.
- Game weather: Indoors • Temperature: 70 °F (21 °C)
- Game attendance: 15,812
- Referee: Carl Chapman
- TV announcers (ESPN+): Dom Izzo (play-by-play), Kyle Emanuel (analyst) and Sam Goetzinger (sideline)

Game information
First quarter
- (7:15) SIU – Paul Geelen 35-yard field goal (Drive: 13 plays, 58 yards, 7:45; Southern Illinois 3–0)
- (7:02) NDSU – Bryce Lance 75-yard run, Eli Ozick kick (Drive: 1 play, 75 yards, 0:13; North Dakota State 7–3)

Second quarter

- (14:56) SIU – Chandler Chapman 5-yard run, Paul Geelen kick (Drive: 6 plays, 65 yards, 3:15; Southern Illinois 10–7)
- (6:12) NDSU – Eli Ozick 38-yard field goal (Drive: 6 plays, 42 yards, 2:35; Tied 10–10)
- (0:29) NDSU – Bryce Lance 9-yard pass from Cole Payton, Eli Ozick kick (Drive: 5 plays, 71 yards, 0:44; North Dakota State 17–10)

Third quarter

- (10:57) NDSU – Cole Payton 2-yard run, Eli Ozick kick (Drive: 8 plays, 75 yards, 4:03; North Dakota State 24–10)
- (4:51) NDSU – Cole Payton 41-yard run, Eli Ozick kick (Drive: 9 plays, 74 yards, 5:29; North Dakota State 31–10)

Fourth quarter

- (11:23) NDSU – Barika Kpeenu 6-yard run, Eli Ozick kick (Drive: 9 plays, 75 yards, 5:32; North Dakota State 38–10)
- (8:57) NDSU – DJ Scott 24-yard run, Eli Ozick kick (Drive: 4 plays, 32 yards, 1:54; North Dakota State 45–10)
- (6:58) SIU – DJ Williams 3-yard run, Paul Geelen kick (Drive: 6 plays, 75 yards, 1:59; North Dakota State 45–17)

Statistics	SIU	NDSU
First downs	22	24
Total yards	313	540
Rushing yards	123	264
Passing yards	190	276
Passing: Comp–Att–Int	15–29–1	16–19–0
Time of possession	27:14	32:45

Team	Category	Player	Statistics
Southern Illinois	Passing	DJ Williams	15/29, 190 yards, INT
Southern Illinois	Rushing	DJ Williams	15 carries, 41 yards, TD
Southern Illinois	Receiving	Fabian McCray	4 receptions, 52 yards
North Dakota State	Passing	Cole Payton	13/16, 243 yards, TD
North Dakota State	Rushing	Bryce Lance	1 carry, 75 yards, TD
North Dakota State	Receiving	Bryce Lance	4 receptions, 79 yards, TD

=== No. 9 North Dakota ===
No. 9 North Dakota Fighting Hawks (4–2) vs. No. 12 Southern Illinois Salukis (4–2) – Game summary

Quarter	1	2	3	4	Total
No. 9 Fighting Hawks	7	21	7	3	38
No. 10 Salukis	0	0	7	12	19

at Saluki Stadium, Carbondale, IL

- Date: October 18, 2025
- Game time: 12:00 p.m.
- Game weather: Sunny • Temperature: 80 °F (27 °C) • Wind: SE at 10 miles per hour (16 km/h)
- Game attendance: 10,132
- Referee: John Shay
- TV: ESPN+

Game information
First quarter
- (9:52) UND – Sawyer Seidl 28-yard run, Kenten Laughman kick (Drive: 9 plays, 64 yards, 3:47; North Dakota 7–0)

Second quarter

- (13:28) UND – Sawyer Seidl 16-yard run, Kenten Laughman kick (Drive: 4 plays, 41 yards, 1:23; North Dakota 14–0)
- (6:47) UND – Jerry Kaminski 2-yard run, Kenten Laughman kick (Drive: 10 plays, 96 yards, 4:58; North Dakota 21–0)
- (0:13) UND – Sawyer Seidl 21-yard run, Kenten Laughman kick (Drive: 1 play, 21 yards, 0:07; North Dakota 28–0)

Third quarter

- (10:02) SIU – Chandler Chapman 4-yard run, Paul Geelen kick (Drive: 7 plays, 67 yards, 3:03; North Dakota 28–7)
- (2:39) UND – Sawyer Seidl 11-yard pass from Jerry Kaminski, Kenten Laughman kick (Drive: 14 plays, 75 yards, 7:23; North Dakota 35–7)

Fourth quarter

- (12:54) SIU – DJ Williams 1-yard run, two-point conversion pass failed (Drive: 12 plays, 65 yards, 4:45; North Dakota 35–13)
- (6:33) UND – Kenten Laughman 22-yard field goal (Drive: 8 plays, 44 yards, 4:49; North Dakota 38–13)
- (2:03) SIU – Tae Marrero Jr. 3-yard pass from DJ Williams, two-point conversion pass failed (Drive: 16 plays, 75 yards, 4:30; North Dakota 38–19)

Statistics	UND	SIU
First downs	22	20
Total yards	384	337
Rushing yards	311	79
Passing yards	73	258
Passing: Comp–Att–Int	9–15–0	29–46–1
Time of possession	32:00	28:00

Team	Category	Player	Statistics
North Dakota	Passing	Jerry Kaminski	9/15, 73 yards, TD
North Dakota	Rushing	Sawyer Seidl	14 carries, 108 yards, 3 TD
North Dakota	Receiving	Nate DeMontagnac	2 receptions, 30 yards
Southern Illinois	Passing	DJ Williams	29/46, 258 yards, TD, INT
Southern Illinois	Rushing	Chandler Chapman	15 carries, 68 yards, TD
Southern Illinois	Receiving	Fabian McCray	6 receptions, 97 yards

=== Northern Iowa ===
Northern Iowa Panthers (2–5) vs. No. 16 Southern Illinois Salukis (4–3) – Game summary

Quarter	1	2	3	4	Total
Panthers	0	3	0	14	17
No. 16 Salukis	10	14	7	0	31

at Saluki Stadium, Carbondale, IL

- Date: October 15, 2025
- Game time: 2:00 p.m.
- Game weather: Cloudy • Temperature: 61 °F (16 °C) • Wind: SE at 8 miles per hour (13 km/h)
- Game attendance: 8,115
- Referee: Jason Berg
- TV: ESPN+

Game information
First quarter
- (12:44) SIU – Chandler Chapman 32-yard run, Paul Geelen kick (Drive: 5 plays, 70 yards, 2:14; Southern Illinois 7–0)
- (3:38) SIU – Paul Geelen 40-yard field goal (Drive: 13 plays, 76 yards, 6:53; Southern Illinois 10–0)

Second quarter

- (9:44) SIU – Aidan Quinn 38-yard pass from DJ Williams, Paul Geelen kick (Drive: 5 plays, 76 yards, 2:15; Southern Illinois 17–0)
- (1:57) SIU – Jay Jones 38-yard pass from DJ Williams, Paul Geelen kick (Drive: 4 plays, 93 yards, 1:25; Southern Illinois 24–0)
- (0:07) UNI – Max Bartachek 32-yard field goal (Drive: 4 plays, -2 yards, 0:20; Southern Illinois 24–3)

Third quarter

- (13:18) SIU – Tae Marrero Jr. 81-yard punt return, Paul Geelen kick (Southern Illinois 31–3)

Fourth quarter

- (2:27) UNI – Briggs Hughston 23-yard pass from Jaxon Dailey, Max Bartachek kick (Drive: 4 plays, 34 yards, 1:53; Southern Illinois 31–10)
- (0:39) UNI – JC Roque Jr. 21-yard pass from Jaxon Dailey, Max Bartachek kick (Drive: 2 plays, 20 yards, 0:47; Southern Illinois 31–17)

Statistics	UNI	SIU
First downs	11	21
Total yards	247	433
Rushing yards	120	230
Passing yards	127	203
Passing: Comp–Att–Int	13–25–1	20–25–0
Time of possession	28:14	31:46

Team	Category	Player	Statistics
Northern Iowa	Passing	Jaxon Dailey	8/15, 93 yards, 2 TD
Northern Iowa	Rushing	Matthew Schecklman	9 carries, 51 yards
Northern Iowa	Receiving	Bill Jackson	5 receptions, 40 yards
Southern Illinois	Passing	DJ Williams	19/23, 190 yards, 2 TD
Southern Illinois	Rushing	Edward Robinson	9 carries, 86 yards
Southern Illinois	Receiving	Jay Jones	3 receptions, 52 yards, TD

=== at Murray State ===
No. 16 Southern Illinois Salukis (5–3) vs. Murray State Racers (0–8) – Game summary

Quarter	1	2	3	4	Total
No. 16 Salukis	7	10	3	7	27
Racers	0	7	0	0	7

at Roy Stewart Stadium, Murray, KY

- Date: November 1, 2025
- Game time: 4:00 p.m.
- Game weather: Sunny
- Game attendance: 8,506
- Referee: Gregory Gompf
- TV: ESPN+

Game information
First quarter
- (7:30) SIU – DJ Williams 1-yard run, Paul Geelen kick (Drive: 15 plays, 72 yards, 7:23; Southern Illinois 7–0)

Second quarter

- (8:29) SIU – Paul Geelen 23-yard field goal (Drive: 7 plays, 31 yards, 3:33; Southern Illinois 10–0)
- (3:56) SIU – DJ Williams 5-yard run, Paul Geelen kick (Drive: 7 plays, 59 yards, 3:50; Southern Illinois 17–0)
- (0:27) MUR – J'Kalon Carter 5-yard pass from Jim Ogle, Jack Tannehill kick (Drive: 12 plays, 75 yards, 3:29; Southern Illinois 17–7)

Third quarter

- (5:33) SIU – Paul Geelen 35-yard field goal (Drive: 9 plays, 50 yards, 3:22; Southern Illinois 20–7)

Fourth quarter

- (12:22) SIU – Lem Wash 40-yard pass from DJ Williams, Paul Geelen kick (Drive: 6 plays, 80 yards, 3:12; Southern Illinois 27–7)

Statistics	SIU	MUR
First downs	23	29
Total yards	404	300
Rushing yards	233	178
Passing yards	171	122
Passing: Comp–Att–Int	11–20–0	15–28–2
Time of possession	35:41	24:19

Team	Category	Player	Statistics
Southern Illinois	Passing	DJ Williams	11/20, 171 yards, TD
Southern Illinois	Rushing	Edward Robinson	18 carries, 109 yards
Southern Illinois	Receiving	Lem Wash	2 receptions, 79 yards, TD
Murray State	Passing	Jim Ogle	14/26, 124 yards, TD, INT
Murray State	Rushing	Jawaun Washington	16 carries, 81 yards
Murray State	Receiving	J'kalon Carter	6 receptions, 61 yards, TD

=== at No. 21 Youngstown State ===
No. 15 Southern Illinois Salukis (6–3) vs. No. 21 Youngstown State Penguins (5–4) – Game summary

Quarter	1	2	3	4	Total
No. 15 Salukis	17	7	0	14	38
No. 21 Penguins	7	7	21	13	48

at Stambaugh Stadium, Youngstown, OH

- Date: November 8, 2025
- Game time: 1:00 p.m.
- Game weather: Cloudy • Temperature: 53 °F (12 °C) • Wind: N at 5 miles per hour (8.0 km/h)
- Game attendance: 8,448
- Referee: David Hergert
- TV announcers (ESPN+): Drae Smith (play-by-play) and Chris Sammarone (analyst)

Game information
First quarter
- (14:08) SIU – Eddie Robinson 12-yard pass from DJ Williams, Paul Geelen kick (Drive: 2 plays, 70 yards, 0:52; Southern Illinois 7–0)
- (11:09) YSU – Kylon Wilson 12-yard pass from Beau Brungard, Andrew Lastovka kick (Drive: 6 plays, 80 yards, 2:54; Tied 7–7)
- (9:03) SIU – Paul Geelen 36-yard field goal (Drive: 4 plays, -1 yard, 0:52; Southern Illinois 10–7)
- (4:08) SIU – DJ Williams 1-yard run, Geelen Paul kick (Drive: 6 plays, 69 yards, 2:45; Southern Illinois 17–7)

Second quarter

- (10:47) SIU – Vinson Davis III 23-yard pass from DJ Williams, Paul Geelen kick (Drive: 9 plays, 85 yards, 3:32; Southern Illinois 24–7)
- (8:05) YSU – Beau Brungard 5-yard run, Andrew Lastovka kick (Drive: 6 plays, 75 yards, 2:42; Southern Illinois 24–14)

Third quarter

- (11:41) YSU – Kylon Wilson 17-yard pass from Beau Brungard, Andrew Lastovka kick (Drive: 6 plays, 69 yards, 3:12; Southern Illinois 24–21)
- (7:56) YSU – Ethan Wright 19-yard pass from Beau Brungard, Andrew Lastovka kick (Drive: 5 plays, 90 yards, 2:01; Youngstown State 28–24)
- (3:02) YSU – Jaden Gilbert 40-yard run, Andrew Lastovka kick (Drive: 8 plays, 91 yards, 3:36; Youngstown State 35–24)

Fourth quarter

- (12:36) SIU – Miles Marshall 2-yard pass from DJ Williams, DJ Williams conversion pass failed (Drive: 14 plays, 75 yards, 5:26; Youngstown State 35–30)
- (10:25) YSU – Beau Brungard 17-yard run, Andrew Lastovka kick (Drive: 5 plays, 75 yards, 2:11; Youngstown State 42–30)
- (1:51) YSU – Jaden Gilbert 13-yard pass from Beau Brungard, Andrew Lastovka kick failed (Drive: 11 plays, 58 yards, 6:09; Youngstown State 48–30)
- (0:35) SIU – Lem Wash 3-yard run, DJ Williams pass to Ryan Schwendeman for two-point conversion (Drive: 8 plays, 68 yards, 1:11; Youngstown State 48–38)

Statistics	SIU	YSU
First downs	25	29
Total yards	537	648
Rushing yards	176	303
Passing yards	361	345
Passing: Comp–Att–Int	23–42–0	26–35–0
Time of possession	25:17	34:43

Team	Category	Player	Statistics
Southern Illinois	Passing	DJ Williams	23/42, 361 yards, 3 TD
Southern Illinois	Rushing	Edward Robinson	11 carries, 85 yards
Southern Illinois	Receiving	Ryan Schwendeman	5 receptions, 96 yards
Youngstown State	Passing	Beau Brungard	26/35, 345 yards, 4 TD
Youngstown State	Rushing	Jaden Gilbert	9 carries, 149 yards, TD
Youngstown State	Receiving	Luke Hensley	4 receptions, 70 yards

=== No. 17 South Dakota ===
No. 17 South Dakota (7–4) at No. 21 Southern Illinois (6–4) – Game summary

Quarter	1	2	3	4	OT	2OT	3OT	4OT	5OT	Total
No. 17 Coyotes	7	7	7	13	7	8	0	2	2	53
No. 21 Southern Illinois	14	10	7	3	7	8	0	2	0	51

at Saluki Stadium, Carbondale, IL

- Date: November 15, 2025
- Game time: 12:00 p.m.
- Game weather: Sunny • Temperature: 75 °F (24 °C)
- Game attendance: 5,622
- Referee: Carl Chapman
- TV announcers (ESPN+): Larry Larson (play-by-play), Pat Poore (analyst) and Taylor Lawrence (sideline)

Game information
First quarter
- (13:56) SIU – Jay Jones 63-yard pass from DJ Williams, Paul Geelen kick (Drive: 3 plays, 75 yards, 1:04; Southern Illinois 7–0)
- (9:36) SDAK – Larenzo Fenner 10-yard pass from Aidan Bouman, Will Leyland kick (Drive: 7 plays, 36 yards, 4:13; Tied 7–7)
- (3:15) SIU – Miles Marshall 2-yard pass from DJ Williams, Paul Geelen kick (Drive: 11 plays, 75 yards, 6:21; Southern Illinois 14–7)

Second quarter

- (13:19) SDAK – L. J. Phillips 7-yard run, Will Leyland kick (Drive: 10 plays, 72 yards, 4:56; Tied 14–14)
- (10:01) SIU – Lem Wash 3-yard run, Paul Geelen kick (Drive: 7 plays, 66 yards, 3:11; Southern Illinois 21–14)
- (0:00) SIU – Paul Geelen 40-yard field goal (Drive: 11 plays, 50 yards, 1:35; Southern Illinois 24–14)

Third quarter

- (11:41) SIU – Ryan Schwendeman 4-yard pass from Jace Clark, Paul Geelen kick (Drive: 4 plays, 8 yards, 1:29; Southern Illinois 31–14)
- (8:02) SDAK – Zach Witte 22-yard pass from Aidan Bouman, Will Leyland (Drive: 7 plays, 75 yards, 3:39; Southern Illinois 31–21)

Fourth quarter

- (11:38) SDAK – Will Leyland 32-yard field goal (Drive: 15 plays, 83 yards, 7:55; Southern Illinois 31–24)
- (4:06) SDAK – Larenzo Fenner 11-yard pass from Aidan Bouman, Will Leyland kick (Drive: 8 plays, 73 yards, 4:58; Tied 31–31)
- (1:10) SDAK – Will Leyland 32-yard field goal (Drive: 8 plays, 55 yards, 1:01; South Dakota 34–31)
- (0:02) SIU – Paul Geelen 36-yard field goal (Drive: 8 plays, 57 yards, 1:08; Tied 34–34)

First overtime

- SIU – Jay Jones 25-yard pass from DJ Williams, Paul Geelen kick (Drive: 1 play, 25 yards; Southern Illinois 41–34)
- SDAK – L.J. Phillips Jr. 16-yard pass from Aidan Bouman, Will Leyland kick (Drive: 4 plays, 25 yards; Tied 41–41)

Second overtime

- SDAK – Larenzo Fenner 24-yard pass from Aidan Bouman, Aidan Bouman pass to Jesse Miller for two-point conversion (Drive: 3 plays, 25 yards; South Dakota 49–41)
- SIU – Vinson Davis III 25-yard pass from DJ Williams, DJ Williams pass to Vinson Davis III for two-point conversion (Drive: 1 play, 25 yards; Tied 49–49)

Third overtime

- No scoring plays

Fourth overtime

- SDAK – Tennel Bryant run for two-point conversion (South Dakota 51–49)
- SIU – DJ Williams run for two-point conversion (Tied 51–51)

Fifth overtime

- SDAK – Aidan Bouman pass to Larenzo Fenner for two-point conversion (South Dakota 53–51)

Statistics	SDAK	SIU
First downs	31	21
Total yards	524	455
Rushing yards	224	148
Passing yards	300	307
Passing: Comp–Att–Int	21–30–1	20–34–1
Time of possession	35:33	24:27

Team	Category	Player	Statistics
South Dakota	Passing	Aidan Bouman	21/30, 300 yards, 5 TD, INT
South Dakota	Rushing	Carson Fletcher	19 carries, 104 yards
South Dakota	Receiving	Larenzo Fenner	6 receptions, 130 yards, 3 TD
Southern Illinois	Passing	DJ Williams	19/31, 303 yards, 4 TD, INT
Southern Illinois	Rushing	DJ Williams	16 carries, 89 yards
Southern Illinois	Receiving	Jay Jones	3 receptions, 108 yards, 2 TD

=== at No. 11 Illinois State ===
No. 24 Southern Illinois Salukis (6–5) at No. 11 Illinois State Redbirds (8–3) – Game summary

Quarter	1	2	3	4	Total
No. 24 Salukis	7	10	3	17	37
No. 11 Redbirds	7	0	0	0	7

at Hancock Stadium, Normal, IL

- Date: November 22, 2025
- Game time: 12:00 p.m.
- Game weather: Sunny • Temperature: 50 °F (10 °C) • Wind: SW at 10 miles per hour (16 km/h)
- Game attendance: 6,895
- Referee: John Shay
- TV announcers (Marquee/ESPN+): Kurt Pegler (play-by-play), Zack Annexstad (analyst), Kacy Standohar (sideline)

Game information
First quarter
- (8:42) SIU – DJ Williams 12-yard run, Paul Geelen kick (Drive: 13 plays, 85 yards, 6:11; Southern Illinois 7–0')
- (4:43) ILST – Tommy Rittenhouse 1-yard run, Matt Maldonado kick (Drive: 9 plays, 75 yards, 3:59; Tied 7–7)

Second quarter

- (14:56) SIU – DJ Williams 1-yard run, Paul Geelen kick (Drive: 11 plays, 49 yards, 3:49; Southern Illinois 14–7)
- (0:29) SIU – Paul Geelen 32-yard field goal (Drive: 10 plays, 63 yards, 4:23; Southern Illinois 17–7)

Third quarter

- (5:07) SIU – Paul Geelen 36-yard field goal (Drive: 8 plays, 43 yards, 3:44; Southern Illinois 20–7)

Fourth quarter

- (12:08) SIU – DJ Williams 3-yard run, Paul Geelen kick (Drive: 12 plays, 90 yards, 6:53; Southern Illinois 27–7)
- (6:25) SIU – Paul Geelen 48-yard field goal (Drive: 4 plays, 6 yards, 1:43; Southern Illinois 30–7)
- (4:22) SIU – DJ Williams 42-yard run, Paul Geelen kick (Drive: 2 plays, 42 yards, 0:14; Southern Illinois 37–7)

Statistics	SIU	ILST
First downs	22	12
Total yards	455	217
Rushing yards	296	73
Passing yards	159	144
Passing: Comp–Att–Int	18–31–0	15–27–2
Time of possession	36:53	23:07

Team	Category	Player	Statistics
Southern Illinois	Passing	DJ Williams	18/30, 159 yards
Southern Illinois	Rushing	Eddie Robinson	19 carries, 145 yards
Southern Illinois	Receiving	Jay Jones	4 receptions, 60 yards
Illinois State	Passing	Tommy Rittenhouse	12/22, 134 yards, 1 INT
Illinois State	Rushing	Victor Dawson	14 carries, 25 yards
Illinois State	Receiving	Dylan Lord	4 receptions, 67 yards

== Ranking movements ==
Ranking movements Legend: ██ Increase in ranking ██ Decrease in ranking RV = Received votes
	Week														
Poll	Pre	1	2	3	4	5	6	7	8	9	10	11	12	13	Final
STATS FCS	20	14	17	13	11	10	8	12	16	16	15	21	24	23	25
Coaches	20	15	14	11	12	11	9	12	18	17	16	23	RV	25	RV
