= 2025 Southeast Missouri State Redhawks football team =

American college football season

2025 Southeast Missouri State Redhawks football
- Conference: OVC–Big South
- Record: 4–8 (3–5 OVC–Big South)
- Head coach: Tom Matukewicz (12th season)
- Offensive coordinator: John Holt (1st season)
- Defensive coordinator: Ricky Coon (4th season)
- Home stadium: Houck Stadium

2025 OVC–Big South football standings
	Conf.			Overall
Team	W		L	W		L
No. 16 Tennessee Tech $^	8	–	0	11	–	2
UT Martin	6	–	2	6	–	6
Gardner–Webb	5	–	3	7	–	5
Lindenwood	5	–	3	6	–	6
Charleston Southern	4	–	4	5	–	7
Southeast Missouri State	3	–	5	4	–	8
Western Illinois	3	–	5	4	–	8
Eastern Illinois	2	–	6	3	–	8
Tennessee State	0	–	8	2	–	10
$ – Conference champion; ^ – FCS playoff participant; Rankings from STATS Poll

The 2025 Southeast Missouri State Redhawks football team represents Southeast Missouri State University (SEMO) as a member of the OVC–Big South Football Association during the 2025 NCAA Division I FCS football season. They are led by 12th-year head coach Tom Matukewicz. The Redhawks play their home games at Houck Stadium in Cape Girardeau, Missouri.

== Offseason ==
=== Preseason poll ===
The Big South-OVC Conference released their preseason poll on July 16, 2025. The Redhawks were picked to finish third in the conference.

=== Transfers ===
==== Outgoing ====
Player	Position	Destination
Joedrick Lewis	DB	Arkansas State
Logan Leftrick	P	Austin Peay
DC Pippin	K	Ball State
Tristan Smith	WR	Clemson
Tyler McMillan	OL	Illinois
Tyson Miller	OL	Indiana State
Jamarcus Hill	OL	Kent State
Jacques Wyatt III	WR	Lindenwood
Carter Guillaume	OL	Louisville
Ja'Mian Golden	DL	Missouri S&T
Sam Cook	DE	Nevada
Greg Menne	QB	Quincy
Kaleb Pearley	OL	Samford
Danny Joiner	TE	Tarleton State
Khalani Riddick	DB	UC Davis
Jaylon Stone	DL	Vanderbilt
Brennan Remy	WR	Unknown
Carter Hensley	QB	Unknown

==== Incoming ====
Player	Position	Height	Weight	Hometown	Previous school
Kam Robinson	WR	5-11	180	White Hall, AR	Central Arkansas
Cyler Christmas	DB	6-0	190	St. James, LA	Coffeyville
Jacob Cox	OL	6-3	310	Amory, MS	Delta State
Ryan Kingston	P	6-6	206	South Bend, IN	Eastern Michigan
David Jones	DB	6-0	210	Baton Rouge, LA	Grambling State
Chris Farrell	OL	6-4	300	Lisle, IL	Kent State
JD Sherrod	QB	6-0	195	Memphis, TN	Kent State
Demoni Taylor	TE	6-4	265	Radcliff, KY	Kentucky State
Jeremiah Santel	WR	6-5	180	Miramar, FL	Lane
Pervis Brunson	DB	5-10	190	Skokie, IL	McKendree
Jamauri Chislom	TE	6-2	260	Jackson's Gap, AL	Memphis
Bryson Burns	WR	6-1	180	Clarksville, TN	Missouri S&T
Wilbert Phillips	OL	6-4	320	Jefferson City, MO	Missouri Southern
Collin Bell	DL	5-11	245	St. Louis, MO	Murray State
Angel Muñoz	DB	6-0	185	El Paso, TX	New Mexico State
Latrell Neville	WR	6-4	200	New Orleans, LA	New Mexico State
Michael Devereaux	LB	6-1	235	El Reno, OK	Old Dominion
Ja’Quaylen Love	DB	5-11	175	Brandon, MS	Pearl River
Jax Leatherwood	QB	6-8	242	San Diego, CA	San Diego Mesa
Jackson Marx	LS	6-1	215	Rock Island, IL	UMass
Blaine Anderson	DB	5-11	175	West Palm Beach, FL	Valdosta State
Tahj Summey	DB	6-0	195	Herndon, VA	VMI

=== Recruiting class ===
Name	Position	Height	Weight	Hometown	High School
Isaac Brown	DB	6-3	185	Union, KY	Cooper
Jayden Smitherman	DB	5-10	180	Brentwood, TN	Ravenwood
Adam Camphor	DL	6-1	300	Merrillville, IN	Merrillville
Tavarious Elliott	DL	6-0	280	Memphis, TN	Whitehaven
Brock Bruner	LB	6-1	210	Fair Grove, MO	Fair Grove
Jett King	LB	6-3	235	Grand Rapids, MI	Caledonia
Ian Williams	LB	6-0	225	Mayfield, KY	Mayfield
Hudson Brewer	OL	6-3	285	Arnold, MO	De Smet Jesuit
Mike Cunningham	OL	6-3	295	Chesterfield, MO	De Smet Jesuit
Patton Leib	OL	6-4	255	Belleville, IL	Althoff Catholic
Chase O'Neal	OL	6-3	290	Poplar Bluff, MO	Poplar Bluff
Hayden Volz	OL	6-2	280	Edwardsville, IL	Edwardsville
CJ Uhl	TE	6-7	225	Republic, MO	Republic
Cooper Falconite	WR	6-0	173	Paducah, KY	McCracken County
Khylen Harris-Norman	WR	6-0	175	Atlanta, GA	B.E.S.T. Academy
Colin Griffin	WR	6-3	210	St. Louis, MO	Parkway North
Gibson Fager	QB	6-3	205	Murphysboro, IL	Murphysboro
Jeremiah Cunningham	P	6-1	195	Festus, MO	Festus

== Schedule ==
Date	Time	Opponent	Site	TV	Result	Attendance
August 30	6:00 p.m.	at Arkansas State*	Centennial Bank Stadium; Jonesboro, AR	ESPN+	L 24–42	18,241
September 6	6:00 p.m.	North Alabama*	Houck Stadium; Cape Girardeau, MO	ESPN+	W 30–21	3,890
September 13	2:30 p.m.	at No. 1 North Dakota State*	Fargodome; Fargo, ND	ESPN+	L 14–41	17,354
September 20	6:00 p.m.	No. 13 Southern Illinois*	Houck Stadium; Cape Girardeau, MO	ESPN+	L 31–59	8,050
September 27	6:00 p.m.	at UT Martin	Graham Stadium; Martin, TN	ESPN+	L 10–34	6,769
October 11	3:00 p.m.	Tennessee State	Houck Stadium; Cape Girardeau, MO	ESPN+	W 28–12	2,653
October 18	2:00 p.m.	Eastern Illinois^{†}	Houck Stadium; Cape Girardeau, MO	ESPN+	W 42–13	5,076
October 25	1:30 p.m.	at No. 9 Tennessee Tech	Tucker Stadium; Cookeville, TN	ESPN+	L 23–42	5,472
November 1	1:00 p.m.	Charleston Southern	Houck Stadium; Cape Girardeau, MO	ESPN+	L 17–23	2,376
November 8	12:30 p.m.	at Gardner–Webb	Ernest W. Spangler Stadium; Boiling Springs, NC	ESPN+	L 24–27	3,246
November 15	1:00 p.m.	at Western Illinois	Hanson Field; Macomb, IL	ESPN+	W 22–17	2,000
November 22	1:00 p.m.	Lindenwood	Houck Stadium; Cape Girardeau, MO	ESPN+	L 13–30	3,463
*Non-conference game; ^{†}Homecoming; Rankings from STATS Poll released prior to the game; All times are in Central time

== Game summaries ==
=== at Arkansas State (FBS) ===
Southeast Missouri State Redhawks (0–0) at Arkansas State Red Wolves (FBS) (0–0) – Game summary

Quarter	1	2	3	4	Total
Redhawks	7	3	0	14	24
Red Wolves (FBS)	7	21	7	7	42

at Centennial Bank Stadium • Jonesboro, Arkansas

- Date: August 30
- Game time: 6:00 p.m. CDT
- Game weather: Sunny • Temperature: 86 °F (30 °C) • Wind: SE at 7 miles per hour (11 km/h)
- Game attendance: 18,241
- Referee: Marshall Lewis
- TV announcers (ESPN+): Graham Doty (play-by-play), Pete Cordelli (analyst), and Darrell Greene (sideline reporter)

Game information

First quarter

- (13:05) ARST – Ja'Quez Cross 7-yard run, Clune Van Andel kick (Drive: 7 plays, 75 yards, 1:55; Arkansas State 7–0)
- (9:18) SEMO – Brandon Epton Jr. 8-yard run, Justin Keller kick (Drive: 10 plays, 75 yards, 3:47; Tied 7–7)

Second quarter

- (14:03) SEMO – Justin Keller 40-yard field goal (Drive: 19 plays, 68 yards, 8:10; Southeast Missouri State 10–7)
- (10:13) ARST – Ja'Quez Cross 4-yard pass from Jaylen Raynor, Clune Van Andel kick (Drive: 9 plays, 65 yards, 3:50; Arkansas State 14–10)
- (9:05) ARST – Devin Spencer 43-yard run, Clune Van Andel kick (Drive: 2 plays, 43 yards, 0:14; Arkansas State 21–10)
- (0:35) ARST – Kenyon Clay 2-yard run, Clune Van Andel kick (Drive: 11 plays, 72 yards, 3:13; Arkansas State 28–10)

Third quarter

- (12:28) ARST – Corey Rucker 9-yard pass from Jaylen Raynor, Clune Van Andel kick (Drive: 3 plays, 64 yards, 1:17; Arkansas State 35–10)

Fourth quarter

- (8:56) ARST – Jaylen Bonelli 10-yard pass from Jaylen Raynor, Clune Van Andel kick (Drive: 10 plays, 68 yards, 5:20; Arkansas State 42–10)
- (7:51) SEMO – Donnie Cheers 60-yard pass from Jax Leatherwood, Justin Keller kick (Drive: 4 plays, 75 yards, 1:05; Arkansas State 42–17)
- (1:23) SEMO – Cam Pedro 31-yard pass from Jax Leatherwood, Justin Keller kick (Drive: 7 plays, 82 yards, 2:20; Arkansas State 42–24)

Statistics	SEMO	ARST
First downs	20	25
Plays–yards	69–364	68–492
Rushes–yards	33–92	36–147
Passing yards	272	345
Passing: Comp–Att–Int	26–36–0	26–32–0
Turnovers	1	1
Time of possession	29:08	30:52

Team	Category	Player	Statistics
Southeast Missouri State	Passing	Jax Leatherwood	26/36, 272 yards, 2 TD
Southeast Missouri State	Rushing	Brandon Epton Jr.	14 carries, 61 yards, TD
Southeast Missouri State	Receiving	Donnie Cheers	4 receptions, 96 yards, TD
Arkansas State	Passing	Jaylen Raynor	26/32, 345 yards, 3 TD
Arkansas State	Rushing	Devin Spencer	3 carries, 42 yards, TD
Arkansas State	Receiving	Chauncy Cobb	5 receptions, 85 yards

=== vs. North Alabama ===
Game Two – North Alabama Lions (0–1) at Southeast Missouri State Redhawks (0–1) – Game summary

Quarter	1	2	3	4	Total
Lions	7	0	0	14	21
Redhawks	0	13	10	7	30

at Houck Stadium • Cape Girardeau, MO

- Date: Saturday September 6, 2025
- Game time: 6:00 p.m.
- TV announcers (ESPN+): Erik Sean (play-by-play) and Rick Wieser (analyst)

Game information

First quarter
Second quarter
Third quarter
Fourth quarter

Statistics	UNA	SEMO
First downs		
Total yards		
Rushing yards		
Passing yards		
Passing: Comp–Att–Int		
Time of possession		

Team	Category	Player	Statistics
North Alabama	Passing		
North Alabama	Rushing		
North Alabama	Receiving		
Southeast Missouri State	Passing		
Southeast Missouri State	Rushing		
Southeast Missouri State	Receiving		

=== at No. 1 North Dakota State ===
Game Three – Southeast Missouri State Redhawks (1–1) at No. 1 North Dakota State Bison (2–0) – Game summary

Quarter	1	2	3	4	Total
Redhawks	7	7	0	0	14
No. 1 Bison	14	17	3	7	41

at Fargodome • Fargo, ND

- Date: Saturday September 13, 2025
- Game time: 2:30 p.m.
- Game weather: Indoors; 70 °F (21 °C)
- Game attendance: 17,354
- Referee: Tyler Downs
- TV announcers (ESPN+): Dom Izzo (play-by-play) and Kyle Emanuel (analyst)

Game information

First quarter

- (12:15) NDSU – RaJa Nelson 15-yard pass from Cole Payton, Eli Ozick kick (Drive: 5 plays, 75 yards, 2:45; North Dakota State 7–0)
- (10:37) SEMO – Kalvin Gilbert 65-yard pass from Jax Leatherwood, Justin Keller kick (Drive: 5 plays, 75 yards, 1:38; Tied 7–7)
- (7:06) NDSU – Bryce Lance 75-yard pass from Cole Payton, Eli Ozick kick (Drive: 2 plays, 79 yards, 0:46; North Dakota State 14–7)

Second quarter

- (14:23) NDSU – Eli Ozick 43-yard field goal (Drive: 5 plays, 41 yards, 2:40; North Dakota State 17–7)
- (10:37) NDSU – Mekhi Collins 28-yard pass from Cole Payton, Eli Ozick kick (Drive: 4 plays, 86 yards, 2:09; North Dakota State 24–7)
- (4:38) SEMO – Payton Brown 1-yard run, Justin Keller kick (Drive: 13 plays, 81 yards, 5:55; North Dakota State 24–14)
- (0:25) NDSU – RaJa Nelson 5-yard pass from Cole Payton, Eli Ozick kick (Drive: 11 plays, 75 yards, 4:13; North Dakota State 31–14)

Third quarter

- (11:19) NDSU – Eli Ozick 43-yard field goal (Drive: 6 plays, 41 yards, 2:08; North Dakota State 34–14)

Fourth quarter

- (12:08) NDSU – Cole Payton 1-yard run, Eli Ozick kick (Drive: 7 plays, 93 yards, 3:39; North Dakota State 41–14)

Statistics	SEMO	NDSU
First downs	12	22
Total yards	217	562
Rushing yards	64	214
Passing yards	153	348
Passing: Comp–Att–Int	13–25–1	16–24–0
Time of possession	29:12	30:48

Team	Category	Player	Statistics
Southeast Missouri State	Passing	Jax Leatherwood	12/23, 145 yards, TD
Southeast Missouri State	Rushing	Jax Leatherwood	10 carries, 20 yards
Southeast Missouri State	Receiving	Kalvin Gilbert	2 receptions, 67 yards, TD
North Dakota State	Passing	Cole Payton	16/23, 348 yards, 4 TD
North Dakota State	Rushing	Barika Kpeenu	14 carries, 84 yards
North Dakota State	Receiving	Bryce Lance	4 receptions, 159 yards, TD

=== vs. No. 13 Southern Illinois ===
Game Four – No. 13 Southern Illinois Salukis (2–1) at Southeast Missouri State Redhawks (1–2) – Game summary

Quarter	1	2	3	4	Total
No. 13 Salukis	0	0	0	0	0
Redhawks	0	0	0	0	0

at Houck Stadium • Cape Girardeau, MO

- Date: Saturday September 20, 2025
- Game time: 6:00 p.m.
- TV announcers (ESPN+): Erik Sean (play-by-play) and Rick Wieser (analyst)

Game information

First quarter
Second quarter
Third quarter
Fourth quarter

Statistics	SIU	SEMO
First downs		
Total yards		
Rushing yards		
Passing yards		
Passing: Comp–Att–Int		
Time of possession		

Team	Category	Player	Statistics
Southern Illinois	Passing		
Southern Illinois	Rushing		
Southern Illinois	Receiving		
Southeast Missouri State	Passing		
Southeast Missouri State	Rushing		
Southeast Missouri State	Receiving		

=== at UT Martin ===
Game Five – Southeast Missouri State Redhawks (1–3) at UT Martin Skyhawks (0–4) – Game summary

Quarter	1	2	3	4	Total
Redhawks	7	0	3	0	10
Skyhawks	14	7	3	10	34

at Graham Stadium • Martin, TN

- Date: Saturday September 27, 2025
- Game time: 6:00 p.m. CDT
- TV announcers (ESPN+): TBA

Game information

First quarter
Second quarter
Third quarter
Fourth quarter

Statistics	SEMO	UTM
First downs		
Total yards		
Rushing yards		
Passing yards		
Passing: Comp–Att–Int		
Time of possession		

Team	Category	Player	Statistics
Southeast Missouri State	Passing		
Southeast Missouri State	Rushing		
Southeast Missouri State	Receiving		
UT Martin	Passing		
UT Martin	Rushing		
UT Martin	Receiving		

=== vs. Tennessee State ===
Game Six – Tennessee State Tigers (1–5) at Southeast Missouri State Redhawks (1–4) – Game summary

Quarter	1	2	3	4	Total
Tigers	0	3	3	6	12
Redhawks	14	7	0	7	28

at Houck Stadium • Cape Girardeau, MO

- Date: Saturday October 11, 2025
- Game time: TBA
- TV announcers (ESPN+): TBA

Game information

First quarter
Second quarter
Third quarter
Fourth quarter

Statistics	TNST	SEMO
First downs		
Total yards		
Rushing yards		
Passing yards		
Passing: Comp–Att–Int		
Time of possession		

Team	Category	Player	Statistics
Tennessee State	Passing		
Tennessee State	Rushing		
Tennessee State	Receiving		
Southeast Missouri State	Passing		
Southeast Missouri State	Rushing		
Southeast Missouri State	Receiving		

=== vs. Eastern Illinois ===
Game Seven – Eastern Illinois Panthers (3–3) at Southeast Missouri State Redhawks (2–4) – Game summary

Quarter	1	2	3	4	Total
Panthers	0	0	0	0	0
Redhawks	0	0	0	0	0

at Houck Stadium • Cape Girardeau, MO

- Date: Saturday October 18, 2025
- Game time: TBA
- TV announcers (ESPN+): TBA

Game information

First quarter
Second quarter
Third quarter
Fourth quarter

Statistics	EIU	SEMO
First downs		
Total yards		
Rushing yards		
Passing yards		
Passing: Comp–Att–Int		
Time of possession		

Team	Category	Player	Statistics
Eastern Illinois	Passing		
Eastern Illinois	Rushing		
Eastern Illinois	Receiving		
Southeast Missouri State	Passing		
Southeast Missouri State	Rushing		
Southeast Missouri State	Receiving		

=== at No. 9 Tennessee Tech ===
Game Eight – Southeast Missouri State Redhawks (3–4) at No. 9 Tennessee Tech Golden Eagles (7–0) – Game summary

Quarter	1	2	3	4	Total
Redhawks	0	6	10	7	23
No. 9 Golden Eagles	7	14	0	21	42

at Tucker Stadium • Cookeville, TN

- Date: Saturday October 25, 2025
- Game time: TBA
- TV announcers (ESPN+): TBA

Game information

First quarter
Second quarter
Third quarter
Fourth quarter

Statistics	SEMO	TNTC
First downs		
Total yards		
Rushing yards		
Passing yards		
Passing: Comp–Att–Int		
Time of possession		

Team	Category	Player	Statistics
Southeast Missouri State	Passing		
Southeast Missouri State	Rushing		
Southeast Missouri State	Receiving		
Tennessee Tech	Passing		
Tennessee Tech	Rushing		
Tennessee Tech	Receiving		

=== vs. Charleston Southern ===
Game Nine – Charleston Southern Buccaneers (3–6) at Southeast Missouri State Redhawks (3–5) – Game summary

Quarter	1	2	3	4	Total
Buccaneers	0	0	0	0	0
Redhawks	0	0	0	0	0

at Houck Stadium • Cape Girardeau, MO

- Date: Saturday November 1, 2025
- Game time: TBA
- TV announcers (ESPN+): TBA

Game information

First quarter
Second quarter
Third quarter
Fourth quarter

Statistics	CHSO	SEMO
First downs		
Total yards		
Rushing yards		
Passing yards		
Passing: Comp–Att–Int		
Time of possession		

Team	Category	Player	Statistics
Charleston Southern	Passing		
Charleston Southern	Rushing		
Charleston Southern	Receiving		
Southeast Missouri State	Passing		
Southeast Missouri State	Rushing		
Southeast Missouri State	Receiving		

=== at Gardner–Webb ===
Game Ten – Southeast Missouri State Redhawks (3–6) at Gardner–Webb Runnin' Bulldogs (5–4) – Game summary

Quarter	1	2	3	4	Total
Redhawks	0	0	0	0	0
Runnin' Bulldogs	0	0	0	0	0

at Ernest W. Spangler Stadium • Boiling Springs, NC

- Date: Saturday November 8, 2025
- Game time: TBA
- TV announcers (ESPN+): TBA

Game information

First quarter
Second quarter
Third quarter
Fourth quarter

Statistics	SEMO	GWEB
First downs		
Total yards		
Rushing yards		
Passing yards		
Passing: Comp–Att–Int		
Time of possession		

Team	Category	Player	Statistics
Southeast Missouri State	Passing		
Southeast Missouri State	Rushing		
Southeast Missouri State	Receiving		
Gardner–Webb	Passing		
Gardner–Webb	Rushing		
Gardner–Webb	Receiving		

=== at Western Illinois ===
Game Eleven – Southeast Missouri State Redhawks (0–0) at Western Illinois Leathernecks (0–0) – Game summary

Quarter	1	2	3	4	Total
Redhawks	0	0	0	0	0
Leathernecks	0	0	0	0	0

at Hanson Field • Macomb, IL

- Date: Saturday November 15, 2025
- Game time: TBA
- TV announcers (ESPN+): TBA

Game information

First quarter
Second quarter
Third quarter
Fourth quarter

Statistics	SEMO	WIU
First downs		
Total yards		
Rushing yards		
Passing yards		
Passing: Comp–Att–Int		
Time of possession		

Team	Category	Player	Statistics
Southeast Missouri State	Passing		
Southeast Missouri State	Rushing		
Southeast Missouri State	Receiving		
Western Illinois	Passing		
Western Illinois	Rushing		
Western Illinois	Receiving		

=== vs. Lindenwood ===
Game Twelve – Lindenwood Lions (0–0) at Southeast Missouri State Redhawks (0–0) – Game summary

Quarter	1	2	3	4	Total
Lions	0	0	0	0	0
Redhawks	0	0	0	0	0

at Houck Stadium • Cape Girardeau, MO

- Date: Saturday November 22, 2025
- Game time: TBA
- TV announcers (ESPN+): TBA

Game information

First quarter
Second quarter
Third quarter
Fourth quarter

Statistics	LIN	SEMO
First downs		
Total yards		
Rushing yards		
Passing yards		
Passing: Comp–Att–Int		
Time of possession		

Team	Category	Player	Statistics
Lindenwood	Passing		
Lindenwood	Rushing		
Lindenwood	Receiving		
Southeast Missouri State	Passing		
Southeast Missouri State	Rushing		
Southeast Missouri State	Receiving		
