= 2025 Northern Illinois Huskies football team =

American college football season

2025 Northern Illinois Huskies football
- Conference: Mid-American Conference
- Record: 3–9 (2–6 MAC)
- Head coach: Thomas Hammock (7th season)
- Offensive coordinator: Quinn Sanders (1st season)
- Offensive scheme: Multiple
- Defensive coordinator: Rob Harley (1st season)
- Base defense: 4–2–5
- Home stadium: Huskie Stadium

2025 Mid-American Conference football standings
	Conf.			Overall
Team	W		L	W		L
Western Michigan y$	7	–	1	10	–	4
Miami (OH) y	6	–	2	7	–	7
Ohio	6	–	2	9	–	4
Toledo	6	–	2	8	–	5
Central Michigan	5	–	3	7	–	6
Akron*	4	–	4	5	–	7
Buffalo	4	–	4	5	–	7
Kent State	4	–	4	5	–	7
Eastern Michigan	3	–	5	4	–	8
Ball State	3	–	5	4	–	8
Bowling Green	2	–	6	4	–	8
Northern Illinois	2	–	6	3	–	9
UMass	0	–	8	0	–	12
Championship: Western Michigan 23, Miami (OH) 13
$ – Conference champion; y – Championship game participant; * Ineligible for postseason play due to low APR score

The 2025 Northern Illinois Huskies football team represented Northern Illinois University in the Mid-American Conference (MAC) during the 2025 NCAA Division I FBS football season. The Huskies were led by Thomas Hammock in his seventh year as the head coach. The Huskies played home games at Huskie Stadium, located in DeKalb, Illinois. This was their last season competing in the MAC before joining the Mountain West Conference as football-only members in 2026. The Huskies' drew an average home attendance of 9,309.

The Huskies were coming off an 8-5 season, with an upset win against eventual national championship finalists Notre Dame, and their second consecutive bowl game win. The Huskies' MAC farewell tour ended in another disappointment with a 3–9 (2–6 MAC) record for the second time under Hammock's tenure, leaving them tied at 10th in conference standings. This was Hammock's 4th losing season under his helm.

Hammock left after the season in February 2026 to join the Seattle Seahawks as the running backs coach and senior assistant. The school promoted defensive coordinator Rob Harley to interim head coach.

== Offseason ==
=== Transfers ===
==== Outgoing ====
Player	Position	Destination
Akim Lanieux	WR	Arizona State
Chase Schutty	TE	Drake
Andre Cobb	DB	Fresno State
Ethan Tierney	S	Fresno State
Ethan Hampton	QB	Illinois
Amariyun Knighten	DB	Indiana
Raishein Thomas	DE	Mississippi State
Nevaeh Sanders	DE	Mississippi State
Cam Thompson	WR	Mississippi State
Santana Banner	S	Missouri
Jalen Johnson	WR	New Hampshire
Kenny Lueth	QB	Northern Colorado
Dane Pardridge	WR	Rutgers
Luke Marble	QB	South Dakota State
Dashaun Gibson	DB	Southern Illinois
Kyle Thomas	WR	Southern Illinois
Skyler Gill-Howard	DL	Texas Tech
Trayvon Rudolph	WR	Toledo
Christian Medlock	OL	Toledo
Keyshaun Pipkin	WR	UT Martin
Isaac Hatfield	LS	UTSA
Grayson Barnes	TE	West Virginia
Cam'Ron Dabney	DB	Western Carolina
Christian Fuhrman	LB	Unknown
Jalonnie Williams	DE	Withdrawn

==== Incoming ====
Player	Position	Previous school
Chavon Wright	RB	Charleston
Andrew Glass	K	Kent State
Thomas McCoy	WR	Marshall
Keshawn Lyons	CB	McKendree
Ross Pedro	LS	Southern Illinois
Miles Thompson	CB	Texas Tech
Alvin Gulley Jr.	DL	Yale

== Preseason ==
The MAC Football Kickoff was held on Thursday, July 24, 2025, at the Ford Field in Detroit, Michigan from 9:00 am EDT to 1:30 pm EDT.

=== Preseason polls ===
==== Coaches Poll ====
On July 24 the MAC announced the preseason coaches' poll.

MAC Coaches poll
Predicted finish	Team	Votes (1st place)
1	Toledo	135 (7)
2	Miami	131 (3)
3	Ohio	123 (3)
4	Buffalo	115
5	Northern Illinois	94
6	Bowling Green	81
7	Western Michigan	71
8	Eastern Michigan	68
9	Central Michigan	65
10	Ball State	41
T11	Akron	39
T11	Massachusetts	39
13	Kent State	12

Coaches poll (MAC Championship)
Predicted finish	Team	Votes
1	Toledo	6
2	Miami	4
3	Ohio	3

== Schedule ==
Date	Time	Opponent	Site	TV	Result	Attendance
August 30	2:30 p.m.	Holy Cross*	Huskie Stadium; DeKalb, IL	ESPN+	W 19–17	10,569
September 5	6:30 p.m.	at Maryland*	SECU Stadium; College Park, MD	BTN	L 9–20	35,331
September 20	3:15 p.m.	at Mississippi State*	Davis Wade Stadium; Starkville, MS	SECN	L 10–38	45,803
September 27	2:30 p.m.	San Diego State*	Huskie Stadium; DeKalb, IL	ESPN+	L 3–6	13,512
October 4	2:30 p.m.	Miami (OH)	Huskie Stadium; DeKalb, IL	ESPN+	L 14–25	13,827
October 11	12:00 p.m.	at Eastern Michigan	Rynearson Stadium; Ypsilanti, MI	ESPN+	L 10–16	15,676
October 18	2:30 p.m.	at Ohio	Peden Stadium; Athens, OH	ESPN+	L 21–48	22,293
October 25	2:30 p.m.	Ball State	Huskie Stadium; DeKalb, IL (Bronze Stalk Trophy)	ESPN+	W 21–7	10,124
November 5	6:00 p.m.	at Toledo	Glass Bowl; Toledo, OH	ESPN2	L 3–42	22,128
November 12	6:00 p.m.	at UMass	Warren McGuirk Alumni Stadium; Hadley, MA	ESPNU	W 45–3	6,155
November 18	6:00 p.m.	Western Michigan	Huskie Stadium; DeKalb, IL	ESPN2	L 19–35	4,734
November 28	11:00 a.m.	Kent State	Huskie Stadium; DeKalb, IL	CBSSN	L 31–35	3,090
*Non-conference game; All times are in Central time

== Game summaries ==
=== Holy Cross (FCS) ===
Holy Cross Crusaders (FCS) (0–0) at Northern Illinois Huskies (0–0) – Game summary

Quarter	1	2	3	4	Total
Crusaders (FCS)	0	3	0	14	17
Huskies	3	3	0	13	19

at Huskie Stadium • DeKalb, Illinois

- Date: August 30
- Game time: 2:30 PM CDT
- Game attendance: 10,569
- Referee: Marcel Kerr
- TV announcers (ESPN+): Kelsie Kasper, Ryan Cavanaugh

Game information

First quarter

- NIU – Andrew Glass 20-yard field goal, 4:00. Huskies 3–0. Drive: 8 plays, 63 yards, 3:24.

Second quarter

- HC – Luis Palenzuela 33-yard field goal, 3:22. Tied 3–3. Drive: 4 plays, -2 yards, 1:49.
- NIU – Andrew Glass 39-yard field goal, 0:10. Huskies 6–3. Drive: 12 plays, 71 yards, 3:07.

Third quarter

No scoring plays.

Fourth quarter

- HC – Blake Youngblood 16-yard pass from Cal Swanson (Luis Palenzuela kick), 10:34. Crusaders 10–6. Drive: 4 plays, 77 yards, 1:27.
- NIU – Dev'ion Reynolds 96-yard kickoff return (Andrew Glass kick failed), 10:21. Huskies 12–10.
- NIU – Chavon Wright 2-yard run (Andrew Glass kick), 4:15. Huskies 19–10. Drive: 8 plays, 61 yards, 4:05.
- HC – Alijah Cason 97-yard kickoff return (Luis Palenzuela kick), 4:03. Huskies 19–17.

Statistics	HC	NIU
First downs	11	17
Plays–yards	55–217	72–287
Rushes–yards	26–62	48–178
Passing yards	155	109
Passing: Comp–Att–Int	17–29–1	14–24–1
Turnovers	1	1
Time of possession	26:34	33:26

Team	Category	Player	Statistics
Holy Cross	Passing	Cal Swanson	17/29, 155 yards, TD, INT
Holy Cross	Rushing	Cal Swanson	12 carries, 51 yards
Holy Cross	Receiving	Max Mosey	6 receptions, 71 yards
Northern Illinois	Passing	Josh Holst	12/18, 101 yards, INT
Northern Illinois	Rushing	Chavon Wright	11 carries, 77 yards, TD
Northern Illinois	Receiving	Dearee Rogers	7 receptions, 73 yards

=== at Maryland ===
Northern Illinois Huskies (1–0) at Maryland Terrapins (1–0) – Game summary

Quarter	1	2	3	4	Total
Huskies	0	3	6	0	9
Terrapins	3	7	3	7	20

at SECU Stadium • College Park, Maryland

- Date: September 5
- Game time: 7:30 p.m.
- Game weather:
- Game attendance: 35,331
- Referee: Matthew Richards
- TV announcers (BTN): Joe Beninati (play-by-play), Matt Millen (color analyst) and Kylen Mills (sideline)

Game information

First quarter

- MD – Sean O'Haire 36-yard field goal, 4:30. Terrapins 3–0. Drive: 8 plays, 62 yards, 2:57.

Second quarter

MD – Dorian Fleming 12-yard pass from Malik Washington (Sean O'Haire kick), 8:46. Terrapins 10–0. Drive: 6 plays, 47 yards, 2:51.

- NIU – Andrew Glass 20-yard field goal, 0:03. Terrapins 10–3. Drive: 19 plays, 75 yards, 8:37.

Third quarter

- MD – Sean O'Haire 29-yard field goal, 7:52. Terrapins 13–3. Drive: 12 plays, 56 yards, 5:09.
- NIU – Telly Johnson Jr. 74-yard run (pass failed), 6:22. Terrapins 13–9. Drive: 3 plays, 73 yards, 1:25.

Fourth quarter

- MD – Shaleak Knotts 42-yard pass from Malik Washington (Sean O'Haire kick), 9:20. Terrapins 20–9. Drive: 6 plays, 77 yards, 3:00.

Statistics	NIU	MD
First downs	13	20
Plays–yards	70–271	64–340
Rushes–yards	48–180	28–86
Passing yards	91	254
Passing: comp–att–int	14–22–0	19–36–0
Turnovers	0	1
Time of possession	33:35	26:25

Team	Category	Player	Statistics
Northern Illinois	Passing	Josh Holst	14/22, 91 yards
Northern Illinois	Rushing	Chavon Wright	27 carries, 90 yards
Northern Illinois	Receiving	Gary Givens	2 receptions, 26 yards
Maryland	Passing	Malik Washington	19/35, 254 yards, 2 TD
Maryland	Rushing	Nolan Ray	11 carries, 50 yards
Maryland	Receiving	Dorian Fleming	4 receptions, 70 yards, TD

=== at Mississippi State ===
Northern Illinois Huskies (1–1) at Mississippi State Bulldogs (3–0) – Game summary

Quarter	1	2	3	4	Total
Huskies	3	7	0	0	10
Bulldogs	7	7	10	14	38

at Davis Wade Stadium • Starkville, Mississippi

- Date: September 20
- Game time: 3:15 PM CDT
- Game weather: Sunny • Temperature: 90 °F (32 °C) • Wind: NW at 3 miles per hour (4.8 km/h)
- Game attendance: 45,803
- Referee: Lee Hedrick
- TV announcers (SECN): Dave Neal (play-by-play), Fozzy Whittaker (analyst) and Morgan Uber (sideline)

Game information

First quarter

- MSST – Brenen Thompson 10-yard run (Kyle Ferrie kick), 9:41. Bulldogs 7–0. Drive: 10 plays, 63 yards, 5:19.
- NIU – Andrew Glass 30-yard field goal, 3:48. Bulldogs 7–3. Drive: 13 plays, 75 yards, 5:53.

Second quarter

- NIU – DeAree Rogers 24-yard pass from Josh Holst (Andrew Glass kick), 14:53. Huskies 10–7. Drive: 2 plays, 27 yards, 0:28.
- MSST – Seydou Traore 1-yard pass from Blake Shapen (Kyle Ferrie kick), 11:31. Bulldogs 14–10. Drive: 8 plays, 48 yards, 3:20.

Third quarter

- MSST – Davon Booth 1-yard run (Kyle Ferrie kick), 12:55. Bulldogs 21–10. Drive: 6 plays, 75 yards, 2:05.
- MSST – Kyle Ferrie 48-yard field goal, 0:54. Bulldogs 24–10. Drive: 15 plays, 50 yards, 7:47.

Fourth quarter

- MSST – Davon Booth 6-yard run (Kyle Ferrie kick), 11:18. Bulldogs 31–10. Drive: 5 plays, 64 yards, 2:10.
- MSST – Xavier Gayten 1-yard run (Kyle Ferrie kick), 4:31. Bulldogs 38–10. Drive: 8 plays, 43 yards, 5:02.

Statistics	NIU	MSST
First downs	14	23
Plays–yards	52–267	69–452
Rushes–yards	27–125	49–292
Passing yards	142	160
Passing: comp–att–int	15–25–1	12–20–0
Turnovers	1	0
Time of possession	28:05	31:55

Team	Category	Player	Statistics
Northern Illinois	Passing	Josh Holst	14/23, 135 yards, TD, INT
Northern Illinois	Rushing	Chavon Wright	13 carries, 47 yards
Northern Illinois	Receiving	DeAree Rogers	6 receptions, 84 yards, TD
Mississippi State	Passing	Blake Shapen	12/20, 160 yards, TD
Mississippi State	Rushing	Fluff Bothwell	17 carries, 101 yards
Mississippi State	Receiving	Anthony Evans III	4 receptions, 80 yards

=== San Diego State ===
San Diego State Aztecs (2–1) at Northern Illinois Huskies (1–2) – Game summary

Quarter	1	2	3	4	Total
Aztecs	0	3	0	3	6
Huskies	3	0	0	0	3

at Huskie Stadium • DeKalb, Illinois

- Date: September 27
- Game time: 2:30 p.m. CDT
- Game weather: Sunny, 84 °F (29 °C), wind E 9 mph (14 km/h)
- Game attendance: 13,512
- Referee: Chris La Mange
- TV announcers (ESPN+): Jason Ross Jr. (play-by-play) and Tyoka Jackson (analyst)

Game information

First quarter

- NIU (7:10) – Andrew Glass 31-yard field goal; Drive: 16 plays, 62 yards, 7:50 (Huskies 3–0)

Second quarter

- SDSU (14:55) – Gabriel Plascencia 30-yard field goal; Drive: 13 plays, 63 yards, 7:15 (Tied 3–3)

Third quarter

No scoring plays

Fourth quarter

- SDSU (0:00) – Gabriel Plascencia 25-yard field goal; Drive: 7 plays, 49 yards, 1:44 (Aztecs 6–3)

Statistics	SDSU	NIU
First downs	19	10
Plays–yards	66–266	57–179
Rushes–yards	44–151	41–122
Passing yards	115	57
Passing: Comp–Att–Int	14–22–2	7–16–1
Turnovers	2	1
Time of possession	31:18	28:42

Team	Category	Player	Statistics
San Diego State	Passing	Jayden Denegal	13/20, 110 yards, 2 INT
San Diego State	Rushing	Lucky Sutton	17 carries, 88 yards
San Diego State	Receiving	Jordan Napier	6 receptions, 52 yards
Northern Illinois	Passing	Josh Holst	6/14, 49 yards
Northern Illinois	Rushing	Telly Johnson Jr.	16 carries, 53 yards
Northern Illinois	Receiving	DeAree Rogers	5 receptions, 51 yards

=== Miami (OH) ===
Miami RedHawks (1–3) at Northern Illinois Huskies (1–3) – Game summary

Quarter	1	2	3	4	Total
RedHawks	0	10	12	3	25
Huskies	14	0	0	0	14

at Huskie Stadium • DeKalb, Illinois

- Date: October 4
- Game time: 2:30 p.m. CDT
- Game weather: Sunny • Temperature: 85 °F (29 °C) • Wind: NE at 10 miles per hour (16 km/h)
- Game attendance: 13,827
- Referee: Rick Warne
- TV announcers (ESPN+): Jason Ross Jr. (play-by-play) and Tyoka Jackson (analyst)

Game information

First quarter

- (10:18) NIU – Lazaro Rogers 76-yard run, Andrew Glass kick (Drive: 1 play, 76 yards, 0:10; Northern Illinois 7–0)
- (3:23) NIU – Jake Appleget 17-yard pass from Brady Davidson, Andrew Glass kick (Drive: 11 plays, 60 yards, 5:22; Northern Illinois 14–0)

Second quarter

- (14:57) M–OH – D'Shawntae Jones 1-yard run, Dom Dzioban kick (Drive: 7 plays, 75 yards, 3:26; Northern Illinois 14–7)
- (4:51) M–OH – Dom Dzioban 41-yard field goal (Drive: 13 plays, 50 yards, 6:31; Northern Illinois 14–10)

Third quarter

- (13:30) M–OH – Dom Dzioban 45-yard field goal (Drive: 4 plays, 0 yards, 1:25; Northern Illinois 14–13)
- (11:30) M–OH – 0-yard safety (Miami (OH) 15–14)
- (8:11) M–OH – Deion Colzie 8-yard pass from Dequan Finn, Dom Dzioban kick (Drive: 5 plays, 50 yards, 3:19; Miami (OH) 22–14)

Fourth quarter

- (3:31) M–OH – Dom Dzioban 24-yard field goal (Drive: 13 plays, 68 yards, 6:33; Miami (OH) 25–14)

Statistics	M-OH	NIU
First downs	22	11
Plays–yards	76–367	51–220
Rushes–yards	50–197	23–114
Passing yards	170	106
Passing: Comp–Att–Int	14–26–0	13–28–1
Turnovers	0	2
Time of possession	39:06	20:54

Team	Category	Player	Statistics
Miami (OH)	Passing	Dequan Finn	14/26, 170 yards, TD
Miami (OH)	Rushing	Dequan Finn	21 carries, 90 yards
Miami (OH)	Receiving	Kam Perry	3 receptions, 76 yards
Northern Illinois	Passing	Brady Davidson	13/28, 106 yards, TD, INT
Northern Illinois	Rushing	Lazaro Rogers	9 carries, 98 yards, TD
Northern Illinois	Receiving	Dearee Rogers	4 receptions, 40 yards

=== at Eastern Michigan ===
Northern Illinois Huskies (1–4) at Eastern Michigan Eagles (1–5) – Game summary

Quarter	1	2	3	4	Total
Huskies	0	3	7	0	10
Eagles	3	3	0	10	16

at Rynearson Stadium • Ypsilanti, Michigan

- Date: October 11
- Game time: 12:00 p.m. CDT
- Game weather: Cloudy • Temperature: 61 °F (16 °C) • Wind: N at 8 miles per hour (13 km/h)
- Game attendance: 15.676
- Referee: Jason Perkins
- TV announcers (ESPN+): Doug Sherman (play-by-play) and Barrett Brooks (analyst)

Game information

First quarter

- (7:16) EMU – Rudy Kessinger 35-yard field goal (Drive: 14 plays, 63 yards, 4:37; Eastern Michigan 3-0)

Second quarter

- (13:40) NIU – Andrew Glass 30-yard field goal (Drive: 15 plays, 62 yards, 8:36; 3-3)
- (1:42) EMU – Rudy Kessinger 49-yard field goal (Drive: 11 plays, 47 yards, 3:39; Eastern Michigan 6-3)

Third quarter

- (4:26) NIU – Telly Johnson Jr. 80-yard run, Andrew Glass kick (Drive: 1 play, 80 yards, 0:14; Northern Illinois 10-6)

Fourth quarter

- (8:31) EMU – Joshua Long 6-yard pass from Noah Kim, Rudy Kessinger kick (Drive: 9 plays, 64 yards, 4:15; Eastern Michigan 13-10)
- (5:40) EMU – Rudy Kessinger 28-yard field goal (Drive: 4 plays, 5 yards, 2:08; Eastern Michigan 16-10)

Statistics	NIU	EMU
First downs	15	17
Plays–yards	65–332	70–296
Rushes–yards	39–238	38–149
Passing yards	94	147
Passing: Comp–Att–Int	11–26–1	19–32–1
Turnovers	1	1
Time of possession	29:54	30:06

Team	Category	Player	Statistics
Northern Illinois	Passing	Brady Davidson	11/26, 94 yards, INT
Northern Illinois	Rushing	Telly Johnson Jr.	12 carries, 159 yards, TD
Northern Illinois	Receiving	Gary Givens	3 receptions, 42 yards
Eastern Michigan	Passing	Noah Kim	19/32, 147 yards, TD, INT
Eastern Michigan	Rushing	Dontae McMillan	23 carries, 104 yards
Eastern Michigan	Receiving	Joshua Long	5 receptions, 52 yards, TD

=== at Ohio ===
Northern Illinois Huskies (1–5) at Ohio Bobcats (3–3) – Game summary

Quarter	1	2	3	4	Total
Huskies	0	8	6	7	21
Bobcats	14	7	13	14	48

at Peden Stadium • Athens, Ohio

- Date: October 18
- Game time: 3:30 p.m.
- Game weather: sunny, Temperature:78 °F (26 °C), Wind: SSW 9 mph (14 km/h)
- Game attendance: 22,293
- Referee: Rich Edwards
- TV announcers (ESPN+): Doug Sherman (play-by-play) and Je'Rod Cherry (analyst)

Game information

First quarter

- (12:47) OHIO – Sieh Bangura 2-yard run (David Dellenbach kick), 2 plays, 14 yards, 0:39; OHIO 7–0
- (05:03) OHIO – Parker Navarro 17-yard run (David Dellenbach kick), 11 plays, 91 yards, 5:15; OHIO 14–0

Second quarter

- (12:13) OHIO – Sieh Bangura 5-yard run (David Dellenbach kick), 10 plays, 66 yards, 3:47; OHIO 21–0
- (10:08) NIU – Devon Akers 7-yard pass from Josh Holst (Josh Holst Pass to George Dimopoulos), 4 plays, 20 yards, 1:56; OHIO 21–8

Third quarter

- (13:49) OHIO – Duncan Brune 66-yard run (kick failed), 3 plays, 75 yards, 1:11; OHIO 27–8
- (07:40) OHIO – Duncan Brune 4-yard run (David Dellenbach kick), 9 plays, 97 yards, 4:50; OHIO 34–8
- (06:04) NIU – DeAree Rogers 50-yard pass from Josh Holst (run failed), 4 plays, 70 yards, 1:30; OHIO 34–14

Fourth quarter

- (14:55) OHIO – Sieh Bangura 1-yard run (David Dellenbach kick), 11 plays, 75 yards, 6:09; OHIO 41–14
- (12:08) NIU – Chavon Wright 1-yard run (Andrew Glass kick), 8 plays, 75 yards, 2:47; OHIO 41–21
- (02:52) OHIO – Jalen Thomeson 91-yard fumble return (David Dellenbach kick), OHIO 48–21

Statistics	NIU	OHIO
First downs	15	27
Plays–yards	56–293	75–538
Rushes–yards	26–132	52–333
Passing yards	161	205
Passing: Comp–Att–Int	21–30–0	17–23–1
Turnovers	1	1
Time of possession	24:10	35:50

Team	Category	Player	Statistics
Northern Illinois	Passing	Josh Holst	21/29, 161 yards, 2 TD
Northern Illinois	Rushing	Telly Johnson Jr.	11 carries, 64 yards
Northern Illinois	Receiving	DeAree Rogers	7 receptions, 107 yards, TD
Ohio	Passing	Parker Navarro	17/23, 205 yards, INT
Ohio	Rushing	Sieh Bangura	22 carries, 147 yards, 3 TD
Ohio	Receiving	Chase Hendricks	10 receptions, 108 yards

=== Ball State (Bronze Stalk Trophy) ===
Ball State Cardinals (3–4) at Northern Illinois Huskies (1–6) – Game summary

Quarter	1	2	3	4	Total
Cardinals	0	7	0	0	7
Huskies	7	0	7	7	21

at Huskie Stadium • DeKalb, Illinois

- Date: October 25
- Game time: 2:30 p.m. CDT
- Game weather: Cloudy • Temperature: 54 °F (12 °C) • Wind: NW at 9 miles per hour (14 km/h)
- Game attendance: 10,124
- Referee: Chris La Mange
- TV announcers (ESPN+): Jason Ross Jr. (play-by-play) and Forrest Conoly (analyst)

Game information

First quarter

- NIU – Telly Johnson Jr. 53-yard run (Andrew Glass kick), 11:41. Huskies 7–0. Drive: 3 plays, 60 yards, 1:08.

Second quarter

- BALL – Drew Cassens 1-yard pass from Kiael Kelly (Carson Holmer kick), 13:30. Tied 7–7. Drive: 11 plays, 80 yards, 5:13.

Third quarter

- NIU – Josh Holst 7-yard run (Andrew Glass kick), 7:26. Huskies 14–7. Drive: 15 plays, 78 yards, 7:30.

Fourth quarter

- NIU – DeAree Rogers 14-yard pass from Josh Holst (Andrew Glass kick), 13:59. Huskies 21–7. Drive: 4 plays, 25 yards, 1:25.

Statistics	BALL	NIU
First downs	15	17
Plays–yards	66–275	68–370
Rushes–yards	43–139	57–305
Passing yards	136	65
Passing: Comp–Att–Int	10-23-2	6-11-1
Turnovers	3	3
Time of possession	29:30	30:30

Team	Category	Player	Statistics
Ball State	Passing	Kiael Kelly	10/23, 136 yards, TD, 2 INT
Ball State	Rushing	Kiael Kelly	27 carries, 86 yards
Ball State	Receiving	Ty Robinson	3 receptions, 37 yards
Northern Illinois	Passing	Josh Holst	6/11, 65 yards, TD, INT
Northern Illinois	Rushing	Chavon Wright	27 carries, 166 yards
Northern Illinois	Receiving	DeAree Rogers	3 receptions, 43 yards, TD

=== at Toledo ===
Northern Illinois Huskies (2-6) at Toledo Rockets (4-4) – Game summary

Quarter	1	2	3	4	Total
Huskies	3	0	0	0	3
Rockets	7	21	7	7	42

at Glass Bowl • Toledo, Ohio

- Date: November 5
- Game time: 6:00 p.m. CDT
- Game weather: Cloudy • Temperature: 52 °F (11 °C) • Wind: NW at 12 miles per hour (19 km/h)
- Game attendance: 22,128
- Referee: Jeremy Valentine
- TV announcers (ESPN2): Jay Alter (play-by-play) and Rocky Boiman (analyst)

Game information

First quarter

- (14:45) TOL – Trayvon Rudolph 96-yard kickoff return, Dylan Cunanan kick (Toledo 7–0)
- (9:25) NIU – Andrew Glass 50-yard field goal (Drive: 12 plays, 42 yards, 5:21; Toledo 7–3)

Second quarter

- (11:01) TOL – Tucker Gleason 2-yard run, Dylan Cunanan kick (Drive: 7 plays, 44 yards, 3:44; Toledo 14–3)
- (5:08) TOL – Chip Trayanum 5-yard run, Dylan Cunanan kick (Drive: 9 plays, 68 yards, 4:23; Toledo 21–3)
- (0:51) TOL – Junior Vandeross III 19-yard pass from Tucker Gleason, Dylan Cunanan kick (Drive: 8 plays, 92 yards, 1:03; Toledo 28–3)

Third quarter

- (4:53) TOL – Kenji Christian 10-yard run, Dylan Cunanan kick (Drive: 8 plays, 63 yards, 3:38; Toledo 35–3)

Fourth quarter

- (13:43) TOL – Kenji Christian 16-yard pass from Tucker Gleason, Dylan Cunanan kick (Drive: 7 plays, 61 yards, 4:28; Toledo 42–3)

Statistics	NIU	TOL
First downs	13	23
Plays–yards	65–203	62–443
Rushes–yards	36–62	29–134
Passing yards	141	309
Passing: Comp–Att–Int	11–29–0	25–33–0
Turnovers	0	0
Time of possession	29:42	30:18

Team	Category	Player	Statistics
Northern Illinois	Passing	Josh Holst	5/13, 87 yards
Northern Illinois	Rushing	Chavon Wright	11 carries, 21 yards
Northern Illinois	Receiving	Rickey Taylor Jr.	3 receptions, 69 yards
Toledo	Passing	Tucker Gleason	25/31, 309 yards, 2 TD
Toledo	Rushing	Chip Trayanum	11 carries, 36 yards, TD
Toledo	Receiving	Junior Vandeross III	6 receptions, 97 yards, TD

=== at UMass ===
Northern Illinois Huskies (2–7) at UMass Minutemen (0–9) – Game summary

Quarter	1	2	3	4	Total
Huskies	10	21	14	0	45
Minutemen	0	0	0	3	3

at Warren McGuirk Alumni Stadium • Hadley, Massachusetts

- Date: November 12
- Game time: 7:00 PM EST
- Game weather: Sunny • Temperature: 38 °F (3 °C) • Wind: S at 5 miles per hour (8.0 km/h)
- Game attendance: 6,155
- Referee: Rich Edwards
- TV announcers (ESPNU): Cooper Boardman (play-by-play) and Craig Haubert (analyst)

Game information

First quarter

- (10:41) NIU – Andrew Glass 37-yard field goal (Drive: 4 plays, 6 yards, 1:36; Northern Illinois 3–0)
- (4:53) NIU – Jalen Macon 13-yard run, Andrew Glass kick (Drive: 11 plays, 66 yards, 5:06; Northern Illinois 10–0)

Second quarter

- (11:42) NIU – Elijah Porter 67-yard pass from Jalen Macon, Andrew Glass kick (Drive: 6 plays, 79 yards, 3:14; Northern Illinois 17–0)
- (2:29) NIU – Chavon Wright 1-yard run, Andrew Glass kick (Drive: 11 plays, 68 yards, 5:53; Northern Illinois 24–0)
- (1:20) NIU – Jalen Macon 1-yard run, Andrew Glass kick (Drive: 2 plays, 13 yards, 0:40; Northern Illinois 31–0)

Third quarter

- (12:05) NIU – Jalen Macon 36-yard run, Andrew Glass kick (Drive: 6 plays, 73 yards, 2:51; Northern Illinois 38–0)
- (8:16) NIU – Gary Givens III 31-yard pass from Brady Davidson, Andrew Glass kick (Drive: 2 plays, 52 yards, 0:23; Northern Illinois 45–0)

Fourth quarter

- (6:13) MASS – Derek Morris 44-yard field goal (Drive: 12 plays, 73 yards, 4:40; Northern Illinois 45–3)

Statistics	NIU	MASS
First downs	22	17
Plays–yards	63–433	67–262
Rushes–yards	55–318	25–65
Passing yards	115	197
Passing: Comp–Att–Int	6–8–0	25–42–0
Turnovers	0	1
Time of possession	33:41	26:19

Team	Category	Player	Statistics
Northern Illinois	Passing	Jalen Macon	3/4, 73 yards, TD
Northern Illinois	Rushing	Jalen Macon	12 carries, 98 yards, 3 TD
Northern Illinois	Receiving	Elijah Porter	1 reception, 67 yards, TD
UMass	Passing	Brandon Rose	11/20, 101 yards
UMass	Rushing	AJ Hairston	3 carries, 23 yards
UMass	Receiving	Jacquon Gibson	6 receptions, 64 yards

=== Western Michigan ===
Western Michigan Broncos (6–4) at Northern Illinois Huskies (3–7) – Game summary

Quarter	1	2	3	4	Total
Broncos	0	14	7	14	35
Huskies	10	3	0	6	19

at Huskie Stadium • DeKalb, Illinois

- Date: November 18
- Game time: 6:00 PM CST
- Game weather: Cloudy • Temperature: 43 °F (6 °C) • Wind: SW at 12 miles per hour (19 km/h)
- Game attendance: 4,734
- Referee: Andrew Speciale
- TV announcers (ESPN2): Courtney Lyle (play-by-play) and Rene Ingoglia (analyst)

Game information

First quarter

- (11:21) NIU – Telly Johnson Jr. 43-yard run, Andrew Glass kick (Drive: 8 plays, 75 yards, 3:39; Northern Illinois 7–0)
- (9:13) NIU – Andrew Glass 39-yard field goal (Drive: 4 plays, -2 yards, 1:54; Northern Illinois 10–0)

Second quarter

- (11:45) NIU – Andrew Glass 41-yard field goal (Drive: 10 plays, 52 yards, 3:43; Northern Illinois 13–0)
- (6:13) WMU – Broc Lowry 18-yard run, Palmer Domschke kick (Drive: 2 plays, 50 yards, 0:41; Northern Illinois 13–7)
- (0:40) WMU – Jalen Buckley 8-yard run, Palmer Domschke kick (Drive: 7 plays, 39 yards, 1:46; Western Michigan 14–13)

Third quarter

- (8:11) WMU – Broc Lowry 8-yard run, Palmer Domschke kick (Drive: 12 plays, 89 yards, 6:44; Western Michigan 21–13)

Fourth quarter

- (9:46) WMU – Jalen Buckley 1-yard run, Palmer Domschke kick (Drive: 15 plays, 76 yards, 7:33; Western Michigan 28–13)
- (7:19) WMU – Broc Lowry 1-yard run, Palmer Domschke kick (Drive: 2 plays, 5 yards, 0:39; Western Michigan 35–13)
- (4:25) NIU – Rickey Taylor Jr. 18-yard pass from Brady Davidson, two-point pass conversion failed) (Drive: 10 plays, 75 yards, 2:54; Western Michigan 35–19)

Statistics	WMU	NIU
First downs	25	13
Plays–yards	68–393	58–252
Rushes–yards	59–361	43–174
Passing yards	32	78
Passing: Comp–Att–Int	5–9–1	6–15–0
Turnovers	1	0
Time of possession	33:49	26:11

Team	Category	Player	Statistics
Western Michigan	Passing	Broc Lowry	5/9, 32 yards, INT
Western Michigan	Rushing	Jalen Buckley	24 carries, 133 yards, 2 TD
Western Michigan	Receiving	Christian Leary	2 receptions, 17 yards
Northern Illinois	Passing	Brady Davidson	5/8, 73 yards, TD
Northern Illinois	Rushing	Chavon Wright	21 carries, 92 yards
Northern Illinois	Receiving	Rickey Taylor Jr.	3 receptions, 53 yards, TD

=== Kent State ===
Kent State Golden Flashes (4-7) at Northern Illinois Huskies (3-8) – Game summary

Quarter	1	2	3	4	Total
Golden Flashes	3	14	3	15	35
Huskies	7	14	0	10	31

at Huskie Stadium • DeKalb, Illinois

- Date: November 28
- Game time: 11:00 AM CST
- Game weather: Sunny • Temperature: 28 °F (−2 °C) • Wind: SE at 11 miles per hour (18 km/h)
- Game attendance: 3,090
- Referee: Matt Packowski
- TV announcers (CBSSN): Dave Ryan (play-by-play) and Ben DiNucci (analyst)

Game information

First quarter

- KENT – Will Hryszko 34-yard field goal, 8:49. Golden Flashes 3–0. Drive: 6 plays, 23 yards, 2:32.
- NIU – Jalen Macon 2-yard run (Andrew Glass kick), 2:12. Huskies 7–3. Drive: 12 plays, 71 yards, 6:31.

Second quarter

- KENT – Terik Mulder 5-yard pass from Dru DeShields (Will Hryszko kick), 12:17. Golden Flashes 10–7. Drive: 9 plays, 81 yards, 4:50.
- NIU – Chavon Wright 38-yard run (Andrew Glass kick), 7:20. Huskies 14–10. Drive: 2 plays, 43 yards, 0:45.
- KENT – Da'Shawn Martin 17-yard pass from Dru DeShields (Will Hryszko kick), 4:15. Golden Flashes 17–14. Drive: 6 plays, 75 yards, 3:05.
- NIU – Jalen Macon 9-yard run (Andrew Glass kick), 0:47. Huskies 21–17. Drive: 10 plays, 75 yards, 3:28.

Third quarter

- KENT – Will Hryszko 28-yard field goal, 6:20. Huskies 21–20. Drive: 10 plays, 72 yards, 5:18.

Fourth quarter

- NIU – Andrew Glass 33-yard field goal, 14:16. Huskies 24–20. Drive: 13 plays, 55 yards, 6:58.
- NIU – Chavon Wright 1-yard run (Andrew Glass kick), 13:52. Huskies 31–20. Drive: 1 play, 1 yard, 0:05.
- KENT – Cade Wolford 31-yard run (Dru DeShields–Da'Shawn Martin pass), 10:23. Huskies 31–28. Drive: 7 plays, 67 yards, 3:23.
- KENT – Gavin Garcia 26-yard run (Will Hryszko kick), 4:11. Golden Flashes 35–31. Drive: 6 plays, 80 yards, 2:52.

Statistics	KENT	NIU
First downs	20	21
Plays–yards	58–438	68–334
Rushes–yards	36–231	58–307
Passing yards	207	27
Passing: Comp–Att–Int	11–22—1	5–10–0
Turnovers	2	1
Time of possession	28:09	31:51

Team	Category	Player	Statistics
Kent State	Passing	Dru DeShiels	11/22, 207 yards, 2 TD, INT
Kent State	Rushing	Gavin Garcia	24 carries, 151 yards, TD
Kent State	Receiving	Da'Shawn Martin	3 receptions, 91 yards, TD
Northern Illinois	Passing	Jalen Macon	5/10, 27 yards
Northern Illinois	Rushing	Chavon Wright	30 carries, 185 yards, 2 TD
Northern Illinois	Receiving	Jason Fowler	2 receptions, 14 yards
