= 2025 UT Martin Skyhawks football team =

American college football season

2025 UT Martin Skyhawks football
- Conference: OVC–Big South Football Association
- Record: 6–6 (6–2 OVC–Big South)
- Head coach: Jason Simpson (20th season)
- Offensive coordinator: Kevin Bannon (10th season)
- Defensive coordinator: Jerry Partridge (1st season)
- Home stadium: Graham Stadium

2025 OVC–Big South football standings
	Conf.			Overall
Team	W		L	W		L
No. 16 Tennessee Tech $^	8	–	0	11	–	2
UT Martin	6	–	2	6	–	6
Gardner–Webb	5	–	3	7	–	5
Lindenwood	5	–	3	6	–	6
Charleston Southern	4	–	4	5	–	7
Southeast Missouri State	3	–	5	4	–	8
Western Illinois	3	–	5	4	–	8
Eastern Illinois	2	–	6	3	–	8
Tennessee State	0	–	8	2	–	10
$ – Conference champion; ^ – FCS playoff participant; Rankings from STATS Poll

The 2025 UT Martin Skyhawks football team represented the University of Tennessee at Martin as a member of the OVC–Big South Football Association during the 2025 NCAA Division I FCS football season. The Skyhawks were led by 20th-year head coach Jason Simpson, the Skyhawks played their home games at Graham Stadium in Martin, Tennessee.

== Offseason ==
=== Preseason poll ===
The Big South-OVC Conference released their preseason poll on July 16, 2025. The Skyhawks were picked to finish second in the conference.

=== Transfers ===
==== Outgoing ====
Player	Position	Destination
Deshawn McKnight	DL	Arizona
Xavier McIver	DL	East Carolina
Lanard Harris	DB	Henderson State
Michael Pleas	LB	Incarnate Word
Adarion Patton	DB	Itawamba
Davonte Murray	DE	Northern Illinois
Max Dowling	TE	UMass
Trevon Tate	WR	UTEP
Colton Peoples	LS	Washington State
LeBron Morgan	DB	Western Illinois
Rashad Raymond	RB	William & Mary
Charles Perkins	DT	Wisconsin
Kody Sparks	QB	Unknown
JaMichael McGoy	DB	Unknown
Ethan Maddox	LB	Unknown
Aidan Maddox	LB	Unknown
Narkel LeFlore	RB	Unknown
Josh Keith	QB	Unknown
Tyler Dostin	TE	Unknown
Connon Littlefield	K/P	Unknown
Josh Hastings	S	Withdrawn

==== Incoming ====
Player	Position	Height	Weight	Hometown	Previous school
Phaizon Wilson	WR	6–2	215	Lancaster, TX	Akron
Duston Chavis	DL	6–3	230	Clarksville, TN	Bethel (TN)
Tanner Bushee	QB	6–2	180	Bennington, VT	Charlotte
Trevon Tate	WR	6–0	180	Erie, PA	Clarion
Eric Lane	OL	6–2	315	Mobile, AL	Coffeyville
Thomas Ansley	RB	6–1	225	La Quinta, CA	Desert
Jacorey Jackson	DL	6–1	285	Atlanta, GA	Concord
Burke Mickelsen	TE	6–4	230	Redmond, UT	Golden West
Corey Yeoman	LB	6–3	230	Atlantic City, NJ	Hampton
Drake Martinez	TE	6–3	240	Cypress, TX	Houston Christian
Ajai Russell	LB	5–10	224	Clinton, IA	Iowa Central
Tah Banda	LB	6–2	230	Houston, TX	Lamar
Tim Toney	WR	5–11	200	Germantown, TN	Memphis
Jordan Beasley	S	6–1	195	Carrollton, GA	Middle Tennessee
Misan Sisk	OL	6–7	350	Memphis, TN	Mississippi Valley State
Keyshaun Pipkin	WR	6–2	202	Indianapolis, IN	Northern Illinois
Drake Tabor	K	6–0	190	Birmingham, AL	Oklahoma State
Jayden House	DL	6–2	250	Las Vegas, NV	Portland State
Jase Bauer	QB	6–2	220	Ankeny, IA	Sam Houston
John Gentry	RB	5–11	205	Houston, TX	Sam Houston
Jordan Johnson	S	6–1	200	Rolling Fork, MS	Southern Miss
Kaleb Costner	TE	6–3	255	Maui, HI	Stetson
Sawyer Phipps	LS	5–9	190	McKenzie, TN	Trine
TyQuarius Perry	DL	6–2	264	Birmingham, AL	Troy
Armoni Goodwin	RB	5–8	200	Trussville, AL	UAB
Tanner Crandall	WR	5–11	190	Gilbert, AZ	Ventura
Jeffrey Miller	OL	6–3	290	Tampa, FL	West Georgia
Mike Moment	OL	6–3	290	Tampa, FL	Western Kentucky

=== Recruiting class ===
Name	Position	Height	Weight	Hometown	High School
Tate Surber	QB	6-3	205	McKenzie, TN	McKenzie
Ethan Eubanks	OL	6-6	260	Oak Ridge, TN	Oak Ridge
Trey Cotton	S	6-1	190	Louisville, KY	Christian Academy of Louisville
AJ McNeil	WR	6-1	185	Carrollton, GA	Carrollton
Isaac Moore	WR	6-2	185	Camden, TN	Camden Central
Moses Adelowo	RB	6-2	205	Aubrey, TX	Braswell
Eithan Everson	DB	6-3	200	Pleasant Grove, AL	Pleasant Grove
Daveon Johnson	DT	6-3	275	Jackson, TN	Jackson Central-Merry Early College

== Schedule ==
Date	Time	Opponent	Site	TV	Result	Attendance
August 28	6:30 p.m.	at Oklahoma State*	Boone Pickens Stadium; Stillwater, OK	ESPN+	L 7–27	44.809
September 6	8:00 p.m.	at UTEP*	Sun Bowl; El Paso, TX	ESPN+	L 17–42	31,122
September 13	6:00 p.m.	No. 17 Southern Illinois*	Graham Stadium; Martin, TN	ESPN+	L 10–37	5,402
September 20	6:00 p.m.	at Missouri State*	Robert W. Plaster Stadium; Springfield, MO	ESPN+	L 10–42	14,476
September 27	6:00 p.m.	Southeast Missouri State	Graham Stadium; Martin, TN	ESPN+	W 34–10	6,769
October 4	1:00 p.m.	at Lindenwood	Harlen C. Hunter Stadium; St. Charles, MO	ESPN+	L 14–30	
October 11	2:00 p.m.	Western Illinois	Graham Stadium; Martin, TN	ESPN+	W 32–31	6,216
October 18	12:30 p.m.	at Gardner–Webb	Ernest W. Spangler Stadium; Boiling Springs, NC	ESPN+	W 37–7	4,602
November 1	2:00 p.m.	at Eastern Illinois	O'Brien Field; Charleston, IL	ESPN+	W 27–20 ^{OT}	4,017
November 8	1:00 p.m.	Tennessee State	Graham Stadium; Martin, TN (Sgt. York Trophy)	ESPN+	W 26–7	3,518
November 15	1:00 p.m.	Charleston Southern	Graham Stadium; Martin, TN	ESPN+	W 17–14	3,006
November 22	12:00 p.m.	at No. 6 Tennessee Tech	Tucker Stadium; Cookeville, TN (Sgt. York Trophy)	ESPN+	L 17–20	6,554
*Non-conference game; Rankings from STATS Poll released prior to the game; All times are in Central time

== Game summaries ==
=== at Oklahoma State (FBS) ===
Game One – UT Martin Skyhawks (0–0) at Oklahoma State Cowboys (FBS) (0–0) – Game summary

Quarter	1	2	3	4	Total
Skyhawks	7	0	0	0	7
Cowboys (FBS)	14	3	3	7	27

at Boone Pickens Stadium • Stillwater, OK

- Date: Thursday August 28, 2025
- Game time: 6:30 p.m.
- Game weather: Cloudy, 77 °F (25 °C)
- Game attendance: 44.809
- Referee: Luke Richmond
- TV announcers (ESPN+): James Westling (play-by-play) and Leger Douzable (analyst)

Game information

First quarter

- (11:24) OKST – Hauss Hejny 11-yard run, Logan Ward kick (Drive: 10 plays, 71 yards, 3:33; OKST 7–0)
- (4:03) OKST – Gavin Freeman 10-yard pass from Hauss Hejny, Logan Ward kick (Drive: 9 plays, 93 yards, 3:36; OKST 14–0)
- (2:15) UTM – John Gentry 39-yard pass from Bryce Bailey, Cade Hechter kick (Drive: 4 plays, 65 yards, 1:42; OKST 14–7)

Second quarter

- (2:46) OKST – Logan Ward 42-yard field goal (Drive: 13 plays, 43 yards, 4:03; OKST 17–7)

Third quarter

- (9:32) OKST – Logan Ward 39-yard field goal (Drive: 9 plays, 58 yards, 4:24; OKST 20–7)

Fourth quarter

- (9:35) OKST – Sesi Vailahi 9-yard run, Logan Ward kick (Drive: 12 plays, 58 yard,s 5:01; OKST 27–7)

Statistics	UTM	OKST
First downs	13	20
Plays–yards	55–225	72–359
Rushes–yards	38–116	42–127
Passing yards	209	232
Passing: comp–att–int	10–17–1	18–30
Turnovers	1	0
Time of possession	28:39	31:21

Team	Category	Player	Statistics
UT Martin	Passing	Jase Bauer	9/16, 70 yards, INT
UT Martin	Rushing	John Gentry	16 carries, 51 yards
UT Martin	Receiving	John Gentry	2 receptions, 45 yards, TD
Oklahoma State	Passing	Zane Flores	13/20, 136 yards
Oklahoma State	Rushing	Kalib Hicks	21 carries, 56 yards
Oklahoma State	Receiving	Terrill Davis	2 receptions, 75 yards

=== at UTEP (FBS) ===
Game Two – UT Martin Skyhawks (0–1) at UTEP Miners (FBS) (0–1) – Game summary

Quarter	1	2	3	4	Total
Skyhawks (FCS)	0	7	3	7	17
Miners	7	21	14	0	42

at Sun Bowl • El Paso, TX

- Date: Saturday, September 6, 2025
- Game time: 7:00 PM
- Game weather: Cloudy • Temperature: 79 °F (26 °C)
- Game attendance: 31,122
- Referee: Reed Brotherton
- TV announcers (ESPN+): Andy Morgan (play-by-play) and Ed Stansbury (analyst)
- Box Score, Recap

Game information

First quarter

- UTEP – Ashten Emery 2-yard run (Carlos Arreola kick), 11:34. Miners 7–0. Drive: 4 plays, 25 yards, 0:50.

Second quarter

- UTM – Bryce Bailey 11-yard run (Cade Hechter kick), 14:48. Tied 7–7. Drive: 5 plays, 33 yards, 2:02.
- UTEP – Toric Goins Jr. 48-yard pass from Malachi Nelson (Carlos Arreola kick), 12:27. Miners 14–7. Drive: 6 plays, 76 yards, 2:07.
- UTEP – Ashten Emery 8-yard pass from Malachi Nelson (Cade McConnell run), 8:02. Miners 22–7. Drive: 6 plays, 76 yards, 2:35.
- UTEP – Hahsaun Wilson 94-yard run (Carlos Arreola kick BLOCKED), 5:00. Miners 28–7. Drive: 2 plays, 96 yards, 0:35.

Third quarter

- UTM – Cade Hechter 21-yard field goal, 7:21. Miners 28–10. Drive: 13 plays, 68 yards, 6:14.
- UTEP – Kenny Odom 74-yard pass from Malachi Nelson (Carlos Arreola kick), 6:25. Miners 35–10. Drive: 2 plays, 70 yards, 0:48.
- UTEP – Ashten Emergy 12-yard pass from Malachi Nelson (Carlos Arreola kick), 3:11. Miners 42–10. Drive: 4 plays, 34 yards, 1:15.

Fourth quarter

- UTM – Phaizon Wilson 20-yard pass from Jase Bauer (Cade Hechter kick), 12:07. Miners 42–17. Drive: 12 plays, 79 yards, 5:58.

Statistics	UTM	UTEP
First downs	19	14
Plays–yards	76–371	54–472
Rushes–yards	40–76	25–194
Passing yards	295	278
Passing: Comp–Att–Int	24–36–0	15–29–0
Turnovers	1	1
Time of possession	38:48	21:12

Team	Category	Player	Statistics
UT Martin	Passing	Jase Bauer	23/33, 273 yards, TD
UT Martin	Rushing	John Gentry	12 carries, 32 yards
UT Martin	Receiving	Bryce Bailey	4 receptions, 92 yards
UTEP	Passing	Malachi Nelson	14/26, 278 yards, 4 TD
UTEP	Rushing	Hahsaun Wilson	8 carries, 117 yards, TD
UTEP	Receiving	Kenny Odom	5 receptions, 124 yards, TD

=== vs. No. 17 Southern Illinois ===
Game Three – No. 17 Southern Illinois Salukis (1–1) at UT Martin Skyhawks (0–2) – Game summary

Quarter	1	2	3	4	Total
No. 17 Salukis	7	10	13	7	37
Skyhawks	0	7	3	0	10

at Graham Stadium • Martin, TN

- Date: Saturday September 13, 2025
- Game time: 6:00 p.m.
- Game weather: Sunny • Temperature: 91 °F (33 °C) • Wind: SW at 5 miles per hour (8.0 km/h)
- Game attendance: 5,402
- Referee: Brandon McCain
- TV announcers (ESPN+): TBA

Game information

First Quarter

- (11:35) SIU – DJ Williams 4-yard run, Paul Geelen kick (Drive: 3 plays, 60 yards, 1:31; Southern Illinois 7–0)

Second Quarter

- (11:07) SIU – Fabian McCray 56-yard pass from DJ Williams, Paul Geelen kick (Drive: 5 plays, 73 yards, 3:09; Southern Illinois 14–0)
- (2:43) UTM – Drake Martinez 2-yard pass from Jase Bauer, Cade Hechter kick (Drive: 11 plays, 69 yards, 6:24; Southern Illinois 14–7)
- (0:00) SIU – Paul Geelen 28-yard field goal (Drive: 4 plays, 59 yards, 0:30; Southern Illinois 17–7)

Third Quarter

- (11:32) SIU – DJ Williams 13-yard run, Paul Geelen kick (Drive: 7 plays, 58 yards, 3:22; Southern Illinois 24–7)
- (5:34) UTM – Cade Hechter 33-yard field goal (Drive: 9 plays, 60 yards, 5:58; Southern Illinois 24–10)
- (2:53) SIU – DJ Williams 12-yard run (Drive: 3 plays, 60 yards, 1:31; Southern Illinois 30–10)

Fourth Quarter

- (1:51) SIU – Chandler Chapman 44-yard run, Paul Geelen kick (Drive: 6 plays, 75 yards, 3:14; Southern Illinois 37–10)

Statistics	SIU	UTM
First downs	22	16
Total yards	490	291
Rushing yards	273	113
Passing yards	217	178
Passing: Comp–Att–Int	13–18–2	23–32–1
Time of possession	29:05	30:55

Team	Category	Player	Statistics
Southern Illinois	Passing	DJ Williams	13/18, 217 yards, TD, 2 INT
Southern Illinois	Rushing	DJ Williams	14 carries, 128 yards, 3 TD
Southern Illinois	Receiving	Jay Jones	4 receptions, 65 yards
UT Martin	Passing	Jase Bauer	22/29, 173 yards, TD
UT Martin	Rushing	Jase Bauer	9 carries, 52 yards
UT Martin	Receiving	Bryce Bailey	6 receptions, 70 yards

=== at Missouri State (FBS) ===
Game Four – UT Martin Skyhawks (0–3) at Missouri State Bears (FBS) (1–2) – Game summary

Quarter	1	2	3	4	Total
Skyhawks	0	0	0	10	10
Bears (FBS)	21	14	7	0	42

at Robert W. Plaster Stadium • Springfield, MO

- Date: Saturday September 20, 2025
- Game time: 6:00 p.m.
- Game weather: Cloudy • Temperature: 75 °F (24 °C) • Wind: SW 8 mph
- Game attendance: 14,476
- Referee: Reed Brotherton
- TV announcers (ESPN+): Don West (play-by-play), Tom Mast (analyst) and Cierra Clark (sideline)

Game information

First quarter

- (11:50) MOST – Jacob Clark 7-yard run, Yousef Obeid kick (Drive: 5 plays, 32 yards, 1:58; Missouri State 7–0)
- (3:27) MOST – Jacob Clark 4-yard run, Yousef Obeid kick (Drive: 13 plays, 83 yards, 6:54; Missouri State 14–0)
- (0:27) MOST – James BlackStrain 6-yard pass from Jacob Clark, Yousef Obeid kick (Drive: 4 plays, 41 yards, 0:59; Missouri State 21–0)

Second quarter

- (11:25) MOST – Connor Lair 1-yard pass from Jacob Clark, Yousef Obeid kick (Drive: 8 plays, 62 yards, 3:26; Missouri State 28–0)
- (0:25) MOST – Dash Luke 17-yard pass from Jacob Clark, Yousef Obeid kick (Drive: 6 plays, 57 yards, 1:49; Missouri State 35–0)

Third quarter

- (12:45) MOST – Shomari Lawrence 50-yard run, Yousef Obeid kick (Drive: 5 plays, 80 yards, 2:11; Missouri State 42–0)

Fourth quarter

- (6:55) UTM – Cade Hechter 32-yard field goal (Drive: 21 plays, 78 yards, 11:13; Missouri State 42–3)
- (1:52) UTM – Tommy Ansley 1-yard run, Cade Hechter kick (Drive: 8 plays, 32 yards, 3:35; Missouri State 42–10)

Statistics	UTM	MOST
First downs	14	22
Plays–yards	57–221	61–417
Rushes–yards	25–71	29–130
Passing yards	150	287
Passing: Comp–Att–Int	23–32–1	22–32–0
Turnovers	3	1
Time of possession	29:32	30:28

Team	Category	Player	Statistics
UT Martin	Passing	Jase Bauer	19/27, 112 yards, INT
UT Martin	Rushing	Tommy Ansley	6 carries, 18 yards, TD
UT Martin	Receiving	Scottie Alexander	3 receptions, 27 yards
Missouri State	Passing	Jacob Clark	20/28, 271 yards, 3 TD
Missouri State	Rushing	Shomari Lawrence	8 carries, 65 yards, TD
Missouri State	Receiving	Dash Luke	9 receptions, 110 yards, TD

=== vs. Southeast Missouri State ===
Game Five – Southeast Missouri State Redhawks (1–3) at UT Martin Skyhawks (0–4) – Game summary

Quarter	1	2	3	4	Total
Redhawks	7	0	3	0	10
Skyhawks	14	7	3	10	34

at Graham Stadium • Martin, TN

- Date: Saturday September 27, 2025
- Game time: 6:00 p.m.
- TV announcers (ESPN+): TBA

Game information

First quarter
Second quarter
Third quarter
Fourth quarter

Statistics	SEMO	UTM
First downs		
Total yards		
Rushing yards		
Passing yards		
Passing: Comp–Att–Int		
Time of possession		

Team	Category	Player	Statistics
Southeast Missouri State	Passing		
Southeast Missouri State	Rushing		
Southeast Missouri State	Receiving		
UT Martin	Passing		
UT Martin	Rushing		
UT Martin	Receiving		

=== at Lindenwood ===
Game Six – UT Martin Skyhawks (1–4) at Lindenwood Lions (2–3) – Game summary

Quarter	1	2	3	4	Total
Skyhawks	0	7	0	7	14
Lions	7	0	14	9	30

at Harlen C. Hunter Stadium • St. Charles, MO

- Date: Saturday October 4, 2025
- Game time: 1:00 p.m.
- TV announcers (ESPN+): Bob Ramsey (play-by-play) and Zach Zook (analyst)

Game information

First quarter
Second quarter
Third quarter
Fourth quarter

Statistics	UTM	LIN
First downs		
Total yards		
Rushing yards		
Passing yards		
Passing: Comp–Att–Int		
Time of possession		

Team	Category	Player	Statistics
UT Martin	Passing		
UT Martin	Rushing		
UT Martin	Receiving		
Lindenwood	Passing		
Lindenwood	Rushing		
Lindenwood	Receiving		

=== vs. Western Illinois ===
Game Seven – Western Illinois Leathernecks (1–5) at UT Martin Skyhawks (1–5) – Game summary

Quarter	1	2	3	4	Total
Leathernecks	7	14	10	0	31
Skyhawks	7	13	0	12	32

at Graham Stadium • Martin, TN

- Date: Saturday October 11, 2025
- Game time: 2:00 p.m.
- TV announcers (ESPN+): TBA

Game information

First quarter
Second quarter
Third quarter
Fourth quarter

Statistics	WIU	UTM
First downs		
Total yards		
Rushing yards		
Passing yards		
Passing: Comp–Att–Int		
Time of possession		

Team	Category	Player	Statistics
Western Illinois	Passing		
Western Illinois	Rushing		
Western Illinois	Receiving		
UT Martin	Passing		
UT Martin	Rushing		
UT Martin	Receiving		

=== at Gardner–Webb ===
Game Eight – UT Martin Skyhawks (2–5) at Gardner–Webb Runnin' Bulldogs (4–2) – Game summary

Quarter	1	2	3	4	Total
Skyhawks	0	0	0	0	0
Runnin' Bulldogs	0	0	0	0	0

at Ernest W. Spangler Stadium • Boiling Springs, NC

- Date: Saturday October 18, 2025
- Game time: 12:30 p.m.
- TV announcers (ESPN+): TBA

Game information

First quarter
Second quarter
Third quarter
Fourth quarter

Statistics	UTM	GWEB
First downs		
Total yards		
Rushing yards		
Passing yards		
Passing: Comp–Att–Int		
Time of possession		

Team	Category	Player	Statistics
UT Martin	Passing		
UT Martin	Rushing		
UT Martin	Receiving		
Gardner–Webb	Passing		
Gardner–Webb	Rushing		
Gardner–Webb	Receiving		

=== at Eastern Illinois ===
Game Nine – UT Martin Skyhawks (3–5) at Eastern Illinois Panthers (3–5) – Game summary

Quarter	1	2	3	4	Total
Skyhawks	0	0	0	0	0
Panthers	0	0	0	0	0

at O'Brien Field • Charleston, IL

- Date: Saturday November 1, 2025
- Game time: 2:00 p.m.
- TV announcers (ESPN+): TBA

Game information

First quarter
Second quarter
Third quarter
Fourth quarter

Statistics	UTM	EIU
First downs		
Total yards		
Rushing yards		
Passing yards		
Passing: Comp–Att–Int		
Time of possession		

Team	Category	Player	Statistics
UT Martin	Passing		
UT Martin	Rushing		
UT Martin	Receiving		
Eastern Illinois	Passing		
Eastern Illinois	Rushing		
Eastern Illinois	Receiving		

=== vs. Tennessee State (Sgt. York Trophy) ===
Game Ten – Tennessee State Tigers (2–7) at UT Martin Skyhawks (4–5) – Game summary

Quarter	1	2	3	4	Total
Tigers	0	0	0	0	0
Skyhawks	0	0	0	0	0

at Graham Stadium • Martin, TN

- Date: Saturday November 8, 2025
- Game time: TBA
- TV announcers (ESPN+): TBA

Game information

First quarter
Second quarter
Third quarter
Fourth quarter

Statistics	TNST	UTM
First downs		
Total yards		
Rushing yards		
Passing yards		
Passing: Comp–Att–Int		
Time of possession		

Team	Category	Player	Statistics
Tennessee State	Passing		
Tennessee State	Rushing		
Tennessee State	Receiving		
UT Martin	Passing		
UT Martin	Rushing		
UT Martin	Receiving		

=== vs. Charleston Southern ===
Game Eleven – Charleston Southern Buccaneers (4–6) at UT Martin Skyhawks (0–0) – Game summary

Quarter	1	2	3	4	Total
Buccaneers	0	0	0	0	0
Skyhawks	0	0	0	0	0

at Graham Stadium • Martin, TN

- Date: Saturday November 15, 2025
- Game time: TBA
- TV announcers (ESPN+): TBA

Game information

First quarter
Second quarter
Third quarter
Fourth quarter

Statistics	CHSO	UTM
First downs		
Total yards		
Rushing yards		
Passing yards		
Passing: Comp–Att–Int		
Time of possession		

Team	Category	Player	Statistics
Charleston Southern	Passing		
Charleston Southern	Rushing		
Charleston Southern	Receiving		
UT Martin	Passing		
UT Martin	Rushing		
UT Martin	Receiving		

=== at No. 6 Tennessee Tech (Sgt. York Trophy) ===
Game Twelve – UT Martin Skyhawks (6–5) at No. 6 Tennessee Tech Golden Eagles (10–1) – Game summary

Quarter	1	2	3	4	Total
Skyhawks	0	0	0	0	0
No. 6 Golden Eagles	0	0	0	0	0

at Tucker Stadium • Cookeville, TN

- Date: Saturday November 22, 2025
- Game time: 12:00 p.m.
- TV announcers (ESPN+): TBA

Game information

First quarter
Second quarter
Third quarter
Fourth quarter

Statistics	UTM	TNTC
First downs		
Total yards		
Rushing yards		
Passing yards		
Passing: Comp–Att–Int		
Time of possession		

Team	Category	Player	Statistics
UT Martin	Passing		
UT Martin	Rushing		
UT Martin	Receiving		
Tennessee Tech	Passing		
Tennessee Tech	Rushing		
Tennessee Tech	Receiving		

== Personnel ==
=== Roster ===
2025 UT Martin Skyhawks football team roster
Players
Coaches
Offense

Pos.	#	Name	Class
QB	9	Julian Calvez	Sr
WR	14	Bryce Bailey	Sr
WR	14	Shawn Hardy II	Jr
WR	16	Kobe Askew	So
WR	18	Scottie Alexander	Sr
QB	18	Hunter Geissinger	Jr
RB	21	Chris Franklin	So
RB	24	Javion Goins	So
OL	50	AJ Marquez	Sr
OL	59	Eric McNeil	Fr
OL	62	Josiah Tingley	GS
OL	64	Dolapo Egunjobi	Sr
OL	68	Garrett Smith	Fr
OL	70	Andrew Smithberger	So
OL	71	Logan Crouch	Jr
OL	72	Jai'Lun Hampton	Jr
OL	74	Mitchell Appleton	GS
OL	77	Riley Turner	Fr
OL	78	Preston Yarber	Jr
OL	79	Elijah Bowser	Sr
WR	81	Anthony Carter	Fr
WR	82	Devin Queen	Sr
WR	83	Deuce Oliver	Fr
TE	83	Hyatt Timosciek	So
TE	85	Jaren Bowling	So
WR	88	Jay Sams	So
WR	89	Jack Irwin	Fr
TE	89	Christian Stapleton	Jr
WR		Phaizon Wilson	Jr
WR		Timothy Toney	Jr
OL		Misan Sisk	So
WR		Keyshaun Pipkin	Jr
OL		Michael Moment	GS
TE		Burke Mickelsen	So
OL		Jeffrey Miller	Sr
TE		Drake Martinez	Sr
OL		Eric Lane	Jr
WR		Tanner Crandall	Jr
RB		John Gentry	Sr
TE		Kaleb Costner	Sr
QB		Jase Bauer	Sr
RB		Thomas Ansley	So
OL		Harlem Trent	So
OL		Conner Mooney	Fr
OL		Nate Moak	Fr
RB		Jahdir Loftland	Sr

Defense

Pos.	#	Name	Class
S	5	Josh Hastings	GS
DB	8	JaMichael McGoy, Jr.	Sr
DB	14	Chris Rhodes	Sr
LB	16	Na'Drian Dizadare	GS
DB	17	Doug Newsome	Sr
DB	18	LaMarion Pierce	Jr
LB	19	Keyshawn Johnson	Jr
S	20	Joel Castleberry	So
S	21	Jacob Stevenson	Sr
LB	22	Jaden Moore	Sr
S	26	AJ Robinson, Jr.	Jr
S	28	Cam Robertson	Jr
S	29	Kaleb Almo	Jr
DB	29	Jamal Mayers	So
DB	30	Desmon James	Fr
DB	32	CJ Cobbins	So
LB	36	Shamari Weir	Sr
S	37	Zamaryion Farmer-McCray	Fr
S	38	Jordan Lee	Fr
LB	39	Lamar Smith	Fr
LB	41	Bryce Dailey	Jr
LB	47	Stefan Ponder	So
LB	49	Keaton Brown	Fr
DL	60	Branson Conner	Jr
DB	80	Quincy Hamilton	So
DE	90	Chris Wilson	Fr
DL	91	Lebron Edmond	Fr
DL	93	Broderick Tommie, Jr.	So
DL	95	Jabaree Dawkins	Sr
DL	96	Trevor Anthony	Fr
DL	97	Toby Camp	Sr
LB		Tah Banda	Sr
DB		Jordan Beasley	So
DL		Duston Chavis	So
DL		Jayden House	Jr
DL		Jacorey Jackson	So
S		Jordan Johnson	Sr
DE		Ty'Quarius Perry	So
LB		Ajai Russell	Jr
LB		Corey Yeoman	Jr
LB		Preston Puni	Sr
LB		George Psychoularis	Jr

Special teams

Pos.	#	Name	Class
LS	40	Sawyer Phipps	So
LS	44	Hayden King	So
K	47	Jaren Van Winkle	Sr
K/P	48	Alex Nolen	So
K	97	Cason Totten	So
K		Drake Tabor	Sr

Head coach

- Jason Simpson

Coordinators/assistant coaches

- Kevin Bannon – Associate head coach/Offensive coordinator/Offensive line
- Jerry Partridge – Assistant head coach/Defensive coordinator
- TJ Jefferson – Special teams coordinator/Corners
- Antonio Clifton – Safeties
- Rudy Griffin – Defensive line
- JaVaughn Craig – Running backs/Tight ends
- Nick Cochran – Wide receivers
- Danny Modelski – Quarterbacks
- Nate Stout – Offensive line assistant
- Hunter Kendall – Running backs/Video coordinator
- Lenon James – Defensive student assistant/Director of player personnel
- Seth Edwards – Offensive student assistant/Quarterbacks assistant

Legend

- (C) Team captain
- (S) Suspended
- (I) Ineligible
- Injured
- Redshirt

Roster
Last update: 8/6/25
