= Jase Bauer =

American football player (born 2002)

No. 8 – UT Martin Skyhawks
- Position: Quarterback
- Class: Redshirt Senior

Personal information
- Born: October 4, 2002 (age 24)
- Listed height: 6 ft 2 in (1.88 m)
- Listed weight: 220 lb (100 kg)

Career information
- High school: Ankeny (Ankeny, Iowa)
- College: Central Michigan (2021–2023); Sam Houston (2024); UT Martin (2025–present)
- Stats at ESPN

Jase Bauer (born October 4, 2002) is an American college football quarterback for the UT Martin Skyhawks. He previously played for the Central Michigan Chippewas and the Sam Houston Bearkats.

== Early life ==
Bauer grew up in Ankeny, Iowa and attended Ankeny High School where he lettered in football and baseball. He was a three-star rated recruit and committed to play college football at Central Michigan University over offers from Eastern Illinois, Northern Iowa, South Dakota State, Southern Illinois and Western Illinois.

== College career ==
=== Central Michigan ===
Bauer was redshirted during his freshman season in 2021. In 2022, he played in six games and started one of them at quarterback. He completed 35 of 59 passes for 435 yards and a touchdown with five interceptions, and rushed for 312 yards and four touchdowns on 53 carries with a long of 60 yards. Bauer also became the first Central Michigan quarterback to rush for over 100 yards in a game since Tommy Lazzaro in 2018.

In 2023, Bauer played all 12 games and started nine, completing 163 out of 287 passing attempts for 1,881 yards and 12 touchdowns, averaging 156.75 passing yards. He also rushed for 365 yards and a team-high 10 touchdowns on 121 carries, for a 3.0 average yards per carry. Bauer was named the MAC West Offensive Player of the Week after the team's comeback victory against South Alabama.

On December 4, 2023, Bauer announced that he would enter the transfer portal.

=== Sam Houston ===
On December 17, 2023, Bauer announced that he would transfer to Sam Houston. In his first career start with the Bearkats, Bauer threw for 76 yards and rushed for 72 more in a 10-7 victory over FIU.

=== UT Martin ===
On December 17, 2024, Bauer announced that he would transfer to UT Martin.

=== Statistics ===
Year	Team	Games			Passing								Rushing			
Year	Team	GP	GS	Record	Comp	Att	Pct	Yards	Avg	TD	Int	Rate	Att	Yards	Avg	TD
2021	Central Michigan	Redshirt (redshirt)														
2022	Central Michigan	6	1	0–1	35	59	59.3	435	7.4	1	5	109.9	53	312	5.9	4
2023	Central Michigan	12	9	3–6	163	287	56.8	1,881	6.6	12	8	120.1	121	365	3.0	10
2024	Sam Houston	5	1	1–0	40	65	61.5	310	4.8	2	1	108.7	45	195	4.3	0
2025	UT Martin	1	1	0–1	9	16	56.3	70	4.4	0	1	80.5	11	37	3.4	0
Career		24	12	4–8	247	427	57.8	2,696	6.3	15	15	115.4	230	909	4.0	14
