= 2024 Maine Black Bears football team =

American college football season

2024 Maine Black Bears football
- Conference: CAA Football Conference
- Record: 5–7 (3–5 CAA)
- Head coach: Jordan Stevens (3rd season)
- Offensive coordinator: Mikahael Waters (1st season)
- Defensive coordinator: Umberto Di Meo (1st season)
- Home stadium: Alfond Stadium

2024 Coastal Athletic Association Football Conference standings
	Conf.			Overall
Team	W		L	W		L
No. 15 Richmond +^	8	–	0	10	–	3
No. 9 Rhode Island* +^	7	–	1	11	–	3
No. 12 Villanova ^	6	–	2	10	–	4
Delaware*	6	–	2	9	–	2
No. 23 New Hampshire ^	6	–	2	8	–	5
Stony Brook	5	–	3	8	–	4
Towson	5	–	3	7	–	5
Elon	5	–	3	6	–	6
William & Mary	4	–	4	7	–	5
Monmouth	4	–	4	6	–	6
Maine	3	–	5	5	–	7
Albany	2	–	6	4	–	8
Hampton	2	–	6	5	–	7
Campbell	1	–	7	3	–	9
Bryant	0	–	8	2	–	10
North Carolina A&T	0	–	8	1	–	11
+ – Conference co-champions; ^ – FCS playoff participant; * Delaware ineligible for rankings and 2024 FCS playoffs due to transition to the FBS. Richmond and Rhode Island named co-champions as Rhode Island's only CAA loss was to Delaware.; Rankings from STATS Poll

The 2024 Maine Black Bears football team represented the University of Maine as a member of the Coastal Athletic Association Football Conference (CAA) in the 2024 NCAA Division I FCS football season. The Black Bears were led by third-year head coach Jordan Stevens and played home games at Alfond Stadium in Orono, Maine.

== Transfers ==
=== Outgoing ===
Over the off-season, Maine lost twenty-one players through the transfer portal. Nineteen committed to new schools.

Name	Pos.	New school
Cole Baker	K	Unknown
Darius Bell	OL	East Carolina
Kahzir Brown	CB	Florida Atlantic
Alex Berrouet	RB	Bentley
Stone Compton	RB	Nichols
Aaron Gethers	CB	Benedict
Rohan Jones	TE	Montana State
Xavier Lozowicki	OT	Cincinnati
BJ Mayes	LB	College of DuPage
Darius McKenzie	LB	South Alabama
Ayden Pereira	QB	Merrimack
Daniel Plascencia	IOL	Texas A&M–Kingsville
Jayden Platt	LB	William & Mary
Sean Pozniak	OT	Tennessee Tech
Clayton Ritter	LS	Albany
Derek Robertson	QB	Monmouth
Dorian Royal	DT	Georgia State
Charles Rulon	P	Unknown
Jylun Spence	S	Oklahoma Baptist
Abdul Stewart	S	West Chester
Vince Thomas	LB	CCSU

=== Incoming ===
Over the off-season, Maine added fourteen players through the transfer portal.

Name	Pos.	Class	Previous school
Jermaine Baker	LB	Gr	Yale
Dorian Blackwell	CB	R-Jr	Nevada
Kenneth Cooper	S	Gr	Merrimack
Jayden Curry	S	Gr	South Florida
Kesean Dyson	LB	Gr	Saint Francis
Mason Gilbert	TE	Gr	Lafayette
Molayo Irefin	WR/KR	Gr	Saint Vincent
Andrew Kocan	IOL	So	VMI
Zephron Lester	DT	Gr	Stanford
Jaharie Martin	RB	Gr	Montana State
John Olmstead	OL	Gr	Lafayette
Carter Peevy	QB	Gr	Mercer
Ty'ee Stephens	WR	R-Fr	Hampton
Isaiah Watson	CB	Gr	Samford

== Schedule ==
Date	Time	Opponent	Site	TV	Result	Attendance
August 30	7:00 p.m.	Colgate*	Alfond Stadium; Orono, ME	FloSports	W 17–14	5,775
September 7	8:00 p.m.	at No. 3 Montana State*	Bobcat Stadium; Bozeman, MT	ESPN+	L 24–41	21,887
September 14	3:30 p.m.	Monmouth	Alfond Stadium; Orono, ME	FloSports	L 22–51	4,574
September 21	1:00 p.m.	at Merrimack*	Duane Stadium; North Andover, MA	NESN+/ESPN+	W 26–15	2,547
September 28	3:30 p.m.	at No. 21 Albany	Bob Ford Field at Tom & Mary Casey Stadium; Albany, NY	FloSports	W 34–20	8,019
October 12	1:00 p.m.	at Delaware	Delaware Stadium; Newark, DE	FloSports	L 21–44	15,564
October 19	1:00 p.m.	No. 5 Villanova^{†}	Alfond Stadium; Orono, ME	FloSports	W 35–7	6,860
October 26	1:00 p.m.	at No. 15 Rhode Island	Meade Stadium; Kingston, RI	FloSports	L 14–24	5,450
November 2	12:00 p.m.	at Oklahoma*	Gaylord Family Oklahoma Memorial Stadium; Norman, OK	SECN+/ESPN+	L 14–59	82,831
November 9	1:00 p.m.	Bryant	Alfond Stadium; Orono, ME	FloSports	W 38–26	5,548
November 16	2:00 p.m.	at Elon	Rhodes Stadium; Elon, NC	FloSports	L 25–31	2,835
November 23	1:00 p.m.	No. 24 New Hampshire	Alfond Stadium; Orono, ME	FloSports	L 9–27	3,190
*Non-conference game; ^{†}Homecoming; Rankings from STATS Poll released prior to the game; All times are in Eastern time

== Game summaries ==
=== Colgate ===
Colgate Raiders (0–0) at Maine Black Bears (0–0) – Game summary

Quarter	1	2	3	4	Total
Raiders	0	7	0	7	14
Black Bears	0	10	0	7	17

at Alfond Sports Stadium • Orono, ME

- Date: August 30, 2024
- Game time: 7:00 p.m.
- Game weather: 0 °F (−18 °C)
- Game attendance: 5,775
- TV: FloFootball

Game information

First quarter
Second quarter
Third quarter
Fourth quarter

Statistics	COLG	ME
First downs	18	17
Total yards	303	296
Rushing yards	129	114
Passing yards	174	182
Passing: Comp–Att–Int	17-27-1	16-21-0
Time of possession	29:45	30:15

Team	Category	Player	Statistics
Colgate	Passing	Michael Brescia	17-27, 174 yards
Colgate	Rushing	Michael Brescia	13 carries, 74 yards, TD
Colgate	Receiving	Brady Hutchison	5 receptions, 72 yards
Maine	Passing	Carter Peevy	16-21, 182 yards
Maine	Rushing	Jaharie Martin	15 carries, 68 yards, TD
Maine	Receiving	Montigo Moss	5 receptions, 84 yards

=== at No. 3 Montana State ===
Game Two – Maine Black Bears (1–0) vs No. 3 Montana State Bobcats (2–0) – Game summary

Quarter	1	2	3	4	Total
Black Bears	0	7	7	10	24
No. 3 Bobcats	21	17	3	0	41

at Bobcat Stadium • Bozeman, MT

- Date: Saturday September 7, 2024
- Game time: 8:00 PM EST
- Game weather: 85 °F (29 °C)
- Game attendance: 21,887
- TV announcers (ESPN+): TBD

Game information

First quarter

- (11:21) MTST - Scottre Humphrey 79-yard run (Myles Sansted kick) (Montana State 7-0)
- (8:33) MTST - Adam Jones 40-yard run (Myles Sansted kick) (Montana State 14-0)
- (4:39) MTST - Ryan Lonergan 4-yard pass from Tommy Mellott (Myles Sansted kick) (Montana State 21-0)

Second quarter

- (14:56) MTST - Scottre Humphrey 6-yard run (Myles Sansted kick) (Montana State 28-0)
- (8:29) MTST - Adam Jones 19-yard run (Myles Sansted kick) (Montana State 35-0)
- (3:15) ME - Montigo Moss 5-yard pass from Carter Peevy (Joey Bryson kick) (Montana State 35-7)
- (0:21) MTST - Myles Sansted 24-yard field goal (Montana State 38-7)

Third quarter

- (11:03) ME - Trevin Ewing 19-yard run (Joey Bryson kick) (Montana State 38-14)
- (3:12) MTST - Myles Sansted 31-yard field goal (Montana State 41-14)

Fourth quarter

- (13:36) ME - Declan McKevitt 25-yard pass from Carter Peevy (Joey Bryson kick) (Montana State 41-21)
- (4:30) ME - Joey Bryson 25-yard field goal (Montana State 41-24)

Statistics	ME	MTST
First downs	16	20
Total yards	373	528
Rushing yards	149	366
Passing yards	224	162
Passing: Comp–Att–Int	18-31-1	14-21-0
Time of possession	31:04	25:44

Team	Category	Player	Statistics
Maine	Passing	Carter Peevy	18-31, 224 yards, 2 TD, INT
Maine	Rushing	Tavion Banks	7 carries, 69 yards
Maine	Receiving	Montigo Moss	5 receptions, 47 yards, TD
Montana State	Passing	Tommy Mellott	11-14, 120 yards, TD
Montana State	Rushing	Scottre Humphrey	4 carries, 110 yards, 2 TD
Montana State	Receiving	Ryan King	3 receptions, 39 yards

=== Monmouth ===
Game Three – Monmouth Hawks (0–2) at Maine Black Bears (1–1) – Game summary

Quarter	1	2	3	4	Total
Hawks	20	7	14	10	51
Black Bears	8	0	7	7	22

at Alfond Stadium • Orono, ME

- Date: Saturday September 14, 2024
- Game time: 3:30 PM EST
- Game weather: Sunny, 78 °F (26 °C), Wind: S @ 5 mph
- Game attendance: 4,574
- Referee: Jeremy DeAngulo
- TV announcers (FloSports): Rich Kimball (play-by-play) and Bob Lucy (analyst)

Game information

First quarter

- (08:01) MONM – Sone Ntoh 4-yard run (Michael Calton Jr. kick) (Drive: 16 plays, 75 yards, 6:59; Monmouth 7-0)
- (02:58) MONM – Jack Neri 11-yard pass from Derek Robertson (Two-point pass conversion failed) (Drive: 10 plays, 76 yards, 3:23; Monmouth 13-0)
- (01:02) MONM – Marcus Middleton 25-yard pass from Derek Robertson (Michael Calton Jr. kick) (Drive: 3 plays, 54 yards, 0:42; Monmouth 20-0)
- (00:57) ME – Trevin Ewing 98-yard kickoff return (Carter Peevy pass to Declan McKevitt for two-point conversion) (Drive: 4 plays, 17 yards, 1:25; Monmouth 20-8)

Second quarter

- (04:51) MONM – Sone Ntoh 2-yard run (Michael Calton Jr. kick) (Drive: 12 plays, 62 yards, 4:40; Monmouth 27-8)

Third quarter

- (12:02) MONM – Josh Derry 56-yard pass from Derek Robertson (Michael Calton Jr. kick) (Drive: 4 plays, 67 yards, 1:57; Monmouth 34-8)
- (06:51) ME - Jaharie Martin 1-yard run (Samuel Tremblay kick) (Drive: 8 plays, 65 yards, 5:11; Monmouth 34-15)
- (03:36) MONM – Rodney Nelson 24-yard run (Michael Calton Jr. kick) (Drive: 6 plays, 84 yards, 3:14; Monmouth 41-15)

Fourth quarter

- (06:51) ME - Joe Gillette 2-yard run (Samuel Tremblay kick) (Drive: 8 plays, 56 yards, 4:10; Monmouth 41-22)
- (13:55) MONM – Josh Derry 94-yard pass from Derek Robertson (Michael Calton Jr. kick) (Drive: 1 play, 94 yards, 0;13; Monmouth 48-22)
- (04:09 MONM – Michael Calton Jr. 42-yard field goal (Drive: 11 plays, 47 yards, 5:21; Monmouth 51-22)

Statistics	MONM	ME
First downs	31	17
Total yards	632	286
Rushing yards	242	128
Passing yards	390	158
Passing: Comp–Att–Int	22-37-0	17-28-0
Time of possession	33:04	26:56

Team	Category	Player	Statistics
Monmouth	Passing	Derek Robertson	22/36, 390 yards, 4 TD
Monmouth	Rushing	Rodney Nelson	14 carries, 91 yards, TD
Monmouth	Receiving	Josh Derry	7 receptions, 227 yards, 2 TD
Maine	Passing	Carter Peevy	16/26, 159 yards
Maine	Rushing	Jaharie Martin	11 carries, 46 yards, TD
Maine	Receiving	Montigo Moss	7 receptions, 53 yards

=== at Merrimack ===
Game Four – Maine Black Bears (1–2) vs Merrimack Warriors (1–2) – Game summary

Quarter	1	2	3	4	Total
Black Bears	0	6	7	13	26
Warriors	10	5	0	0	15

at Duane Stadium • North Andover, MA

- Date: Saturday September 21, 2024
- Game time: 1:00 PM EST
- Game weather: 61 °F (16 °C)
- TV announcers (NESN+): TBD

Game information

First quarter
Second quarter
Third quarter
Fourth quarter

Statistics	ME	MRMK
First downs	21	8
Total yards	336	195
Rushing yards	112	103
Passing yards	224	92
Passing: Comp–Att–Int	18–27–0	13–25–2
Time of possession	34:47	25:13

Team	Category	Player	Statistics
Maine	Passing	Carter Peevy	17/26, 225 yards, 2 TD
Maine	Rushing	Tavion Banks	13 carries, 55 yards, 1 TD
Maine	Receiving	Joe Gillette	4 receptions, 86 yards
Merrimack	Passing	Justin Lewis	8/13, 67 yards, 2 INT
Merrimack	Rushing	Jermaine Corbett	15 carries, 81 yards
Merrimack	Receiving	Jared Dunn	3 receptions, 35 yards

=== at No. 21 Albany ===
Game Five – Maine Black Bears (2–2) vs No. 21 Albany Great Danes (1–2) – Game summary

Quarter	1	2	3	4	Total
Black Bears	3	7	9	15	34
No. 21 Great Danes	0	14	0	6	20

at Bob Ford Field at Tom & Mary Casey Stadium • Albany, NY

- Date: Saturday September 28, 2024
- Game time: 3:30 PM EST
- Game weather: Sunny • Temperature: 79 °F (26 °C) • Wind: SE at 5 miles per hour (8.0 km/h)
- Game attendance: 8,019
- Referee: Paul Matt Overton
- TV announcers (FloSports): TBD

Game information

First quarter

- (9:28) UMA – Joey Bryson 40-yard field goal (Drive: 11 plays, 58 yards, 5:26; Maine 3–0)

Second quarter

- (14:19) ALB – Jojo Uga 2-yard run, John Opalko kick (Drive: 8 plays, 74 yards, 4:12; Albany 7–3)
- (1:57) UMA – Jaharie Martin 1-yard run, Joey Bryson kick (Drive: 8 plays, 62 yards, 3:36; Maine 10–7)
- (0:14) ALB – Seven McGee 13-yard pass from Myles Burkett, John Opalko kick (Drive: 8 plays, 75 yards, 1:38; Albany 14–10)

Third quarter

- (10:14) UMA – Joey Bryson 40-yard field goal (Drive: 6 plays, 16 yards, 3:57; Albany 14–13)
- (1:58) UMA – Cooper Heisey 2-yard pass from Carter Peevy (Drive: 10 plays, 55 yards, 6:15; Maine 19–14)

Fourth quarter

- (7:04) UMA – Cooper Heisey 2-yard pass from Carter Peevy, Joe Gillette pass (Drive: 12 plays, 83 yards, 7:56; Maine 27–14)
- (5:20) ALB – Seven McGee 32-yard pass from Myles Burkett (Drive: 6 plays, 66 yards, 1:39; Maine 27–20)
- (1:46) UMA – Jamaree Gibson 78-yard interception, Joey Bryson kick (Maine 34–20)

Statistics	ME	ALB
First downs	27	16
Total yards	337	260
Rushing yards	135	58
Passing yards	202	202
Passing: Comp–Att–Int	20–24–0	19–32–2
Time of possession	39:10	19:21

Team	Category	Player	Statistics
Maine	Passing	Carter Peevy	20/24, 202 yards, 2 TD
Maine	Rushing	Jaharie Martin	19 carries, 82 yards, TD
Maine	Receiving	Molayo Irefin	5 receptions, 68 yards
Albany	Passing	Myles Burkett	19/32, 202 yards, 2 TD, 2 INT
Albany	Rushing	Griffin Woodell	9 carries, 36 yards
Albany	Receiving	Seven McGee	5 receptions, 83 yards, 2 TD

=== at Delaware ===
Game Six – Maine Black Bears (3–2) vs Delaware Fightin' Blue Hens (5–0) – Game summary

Quarter	1	2	3	4	Total
Black Bears	7	7	0	7	21
Fightin' Blue Hens	7	6	10	21	44

at Delaware Stadium • Newark, DE

- Date: Saturday October 12, 2024
- Game time: 1:00 PM EST
- Game weather: 63 °F (17 °C)
- Game attendance: 15564
- TV announcers (FloSports): TBD

Game information

First quarter
Second quarter
Third quarter
Fourth quarter

Statistics	ME	DEL
First downs	16	25
Total yards	229	458
Rushing yards	82	179
Passing yards	147	279
Passing: Comp–Att–Int	15-25-3	20-31-0
Time of possession	27:50	32:10

Team	Category	Player	Statistics
Maine	Passing	Carter Peevy	15-25, 147 yards, TD, 3 INT
Maine	Rushing	Brian Santana-Fis	6 carries, 31 yards
Maine	Receiving	Montigo Moss	4 receptions, 51 yards, TD
Delaware	Passing	Zach Marker	20-31, 279 yards, 3 TD
Delaware	Rushing	Quincy Watson	12 carries, 68 yards, TD
Delaware	Receiving	Phil Lutz	5 receptions, 133 yards, TD

=== No. 5 Villanova ===
Game Seven – No. 5 Villanova Wildcats (5–1) at Maine Black Bears (3–3) – Game summary

Quarter	1	2	3	4	Total
No. 5 Wildcats	0	0	0	7	7
Black Bears	21	7	7	0	35

at Alfond Sports Stadium • Orono, ME

- Date: Saturday October 19, 2024
- Game time: 1:00 PM EST
- Game weather: 65 °F (18 °C)
- Game attendance: 6860
- TV announcers (FloSports): TBD

Game information

First quarter
Second quarter
Third quarter
Fourth quarter

Statistics	VILL	ME
First downs	17	14
Total yards	214	341
Rushing yards	35	155
Passing yards	179	186
Passing: Comp–Att–Int	18-40-2	18-21-0
Time of possession	29:07	30:53

Team	Category	Player	Statistics
Villanova	Passing	Connor Watkins	14-31, 117 yards, 2 INT
Villanova	Rushing	David Avit	10 carries, 39 yards
Villanova	Receiving	Lucas Kopecky	4 receptions, 43 yards
Maine	Passing	Carter Peevy	16-18, 173 yards, 3 TD
Maine	Rushing	Brian Santana-Fis	11 carries, 56 yards, TD
Maine	Receiving	Joe Gillette	4 receptions, 81 yards, TD

=== at No. 15 Rhode Island ===
Game Eight – Maine Black Bears (3–4) vs No. 15 Rhode Island Rams (6–1) – Game summary

Quarter	1	2	3	4	Total
Black Bears	7	0	0	7	14
No. 15 Rams	0	14	0	10	24

at Meade Stadium • Kingston, RI

- Date: Saturday October 26, 2024
- Game time: 1:00 PM EST
- Game weather: 60 °F (16 °C)
- Game attendance: 5,450
- TV announcers (FloSports): TBD

Game information

First quarter

- (0:53) ME – Cooper Heisey 7-yard pass from Carter Peevy (Joey Bryson kick) (Drive: 12 plays, 90 yards, 7:01; Maine 7–0)

Second quarter

- (7:24) URI – Devin Farrell 1-yard run (Ty Groff kick) (Drive: 5 plays, 56 yards, 1:44; Tied 7–7)
- (1:14) URI – Devin Farrell 6-yard run (Ty Groff kick) (Drive: 9 plays, 41 yards, 4:36; Rhode Island 14–7)

Third quarter

- No scoring plays

Fourth quarter

- (14:56) ME – Brian Santana-Fis 4-yard run (Joey Bryson kick) (Drive: 9 plays, 43 yards, 5:14; Tied 14–14)
- (12:25) URI – Malik Grant 1-yard run (Ty Groff kick) (Drive: 6 plays, 61 yards, 2:28; Rhode Island 21–14)
- (6:04) URI – Ty Groff 35-yard field goal (Drive: 8 plays, 39 yards, 4:19; Rhode Island 24–14)

Statistics	ME	URI
First downs	17	14
Total yards	336	321
Rushing yards	57	119
Passing yards	279	202
Passing: Comp–Att–Int	29–39–0	13–24–0
Time of possession	34:13	25:03

Team	Category	Player	Statistics
Maine	Passing	Carter Peevy	29-39, 279 yards, TD
Maine	Rushing	Brian Santana-Fis	15 carries, 89 yards, TD
Maine	Receiving	Montigo Moss	9 receptions, 80 yards
Rhode Island	Passing	Devin Farrell	13-24, 202 yards
Rhode Island	Rushing	Malik Grant	22 carries, 97 yards, TD
Rhode Island	Receiving	Tommy Smith	3 receptions, 59 yards

=== at Oklahoma (FBS) ===
Game Nine – Maine Black Bears (4–4) vs Oklahoma Sooners (FBS) (4–4) – Game summary

Quarter	1	2	3	4	Total
Black Bears	7	0	0	7	14
Sooners (FBS)	7	28	14	10	59

at Gaylord Family Oklahoma Memorial Stadium • Norman, OK

- Date: Saturday November 2, 2024
- Game time: 12:00 PM EST
- Game weather: 66 °F (19 °C)
- TV announcers (SECN+/ESPN+): Brian Custer (play-by-play), Rod Gilmore (analyst) and Lauren Sisler (sideline)

Game information

First quarter
Second quarter
Third quarter
Fourth quarter

Statistics	ME	OU
First downs	14	26
Total yards	251	665
Rushing yards	107	381
Passing yards	144	284
Passing: Comp–Att–Int	17-33-0	18-26-0
Time of possession	30:16	29:44

Team	Category	Player	Statistics
Maine	Passing	Carter Peevy	13-24, 123 yards, TD
Maine	Rushing	Carter Peevy	6 carries, 47 yards
Maine	Receiving	Joe Gillette	3 receptions, 64 yards
Oklahoma	Passing	Jackson Arnold	15-21, 224 yards, 2 TD
Oklahoma	Rushing	Jovantae Barnes	18 carries, 203 yards, 3 TD
Oklahoma	Receiving	JJ Hester	4 receptions, 112 yards, TD

=== Bryant ===
Game Ten – Bryant Bulldogs (2–7) at Maine Black Bears (4–5) – Game summary

Quarter	1	2	3	4	Total
Bulldogs	0	0	20	6	26
Black Bears	14	21	3	0	38

at Alfond Sports Stadium • Orono, ME

- Date: Saturday November 9, 2024
- Game time: 1:00 PM EST
- Game weather: 44 °F (7 °C)
- Game attendance: 5,548
- TV announcers (FloSports): TBD

Game information

First quarter
Second quarter
Third quarter
Fourth quarter

Statistics	BRY	ME
First downs	25	19
Total yards	356	435
Rushing yards	105	166
Passing yards	251	269
Passing: Comp–Att–Int	23–41–2	19–24–0
Time of possession	28:41	31:19

Team	Category	Player	Statistics
Bryant	Passing	Brennan Myer	23-41, 251 yards, 4 TD, 2 INT
Bryant	Rushing	Dylan Kedzior	16 carries, 60 yards
Bryant	Receiving	Markiel Cockrell	4 receptions, 71 yards
Maine	Passing	Carter Peevy	19-24, 269 yards, 4 TD
Maine	Rushing	Brian Santana-Fis	13 carries, 104 yards, TD
Maine	Receiving	Montigo Moss	7 receptions, 122 yards, 2 TD

=== at Elon ===
Game Eleven – Maine Black Bears (5–5) vs Elon Phoenix (4–6) – Game summary

Quarter	1	2	3	4	Total
Black Bears	3	7	8	7	25
Phoenix	7	7	14	3	31

at Rhodes Stadium • Elon, NC

- Date: Saturday November 16, 2024
- Game time: 2:00 PM EST
- Game weather: 62 °F (17 °C)
- Game attendance: 2835
- TV announcers (FloSports): TBD

Game information

First quarter
Second quarter
Third quarter
Fourth quarter

Statistics	ME	ELON
First downs	17	17
Total yards	330	486
Rushing yards	59	187
Passing yards	271	299
Passing: Comp–Att–Int	22-38-1	17-26-0
Time of possession	28:27	31:33

Team	Category	Player	Statistics
Maine	Passing	Carter Peevy	22-38-1, TD, INT
Maine	Rushing	Jaharie Martin	7 carries, 26 yards, 2 TD
Maine	Receiving	Montigo Moss	5 receptions, 89 yards, TD
Elon	Passing	Matthew Downing	17-26-0, TD
Elon	Rushing	Rushawn Baker	27 carries, 168 yards, 3 TD
Elon	Receiving	Chandler Brayboy	3 receptions, 138 yards, TD

=== No. 24 New Hampshire (Battle for the Brice–Cowell Musket) ===
Game Twelve – No. 24 New Hampshire Wildcats (0–0) at Maine Black Bears (0–0) – Game summary

Quarter	1	2	3	4	Total
No. 24 Wildcats	0	7	10	10	27
Black Bears	9	0	0	0	9

at Alfond Sports Stadium • Orono, ME

- Date: Saturday November 23, 2024
- Game time: 1:00 PM EST
- Game weather: Rain, 43 °F (6 °C)
- Game attendance: 3,190
- Referee: Antonio Marcella
- TV announcers (FloSports): TBD

Game information

First quarter

- (3:56) ME – Joey Bryson 39-yard field goal (Drive: 9 plays, 59 yards, 5:00; Maine 3–0)
- (0:40) ME – Montigo Moss 8-yard pass from Carter Peevy (Drive: 6 plays, 16 yards, 2:26; Maine 9–0)

Second quarter

- (0:11) UNH – Denzell Gibson 1-yard run, Nick Mazzie kick (Drive: 13 plays, 81 yards, 6:08; Maine 9–7)

Third quarter

- (14:44) UNH – Caleb Mead 57-yard run, Nick Mazzie kick (Drive: 1 play, 57 yards, 0:10; New Hampshire 14–9)
- (2:02) UNH – Nick Mazzie 21-yard field goal (Drive: 15 plays, 52 yards, 7:18; New Hampshire 17–9)

Fourth quarter

- (11:45) UNH – Nick Mazzie 22-yard field goal (Drive: 8 plays, 29 yards, 3:51; New Hampshire 20–9)
- (2:03) UNH – Seth Morgan 7-yard run, Nick Mazzie kick (Drive: 1 play, 7 yards, 0:06; New Hampshire 27–9)

Statistics	UNH	ME
First downs	19	8
Total yards	286	198
Rushing yards	122	30
Passing yards	164	168
Passing: Comp–Att–Int	22-34-1	12-26-0
Time of possession	39:11	20:43

Team	Category	Player	Statistics
New Hampshire	Passing	Seth Morgan	22-34, 164 yards, INT
New Hampshire	Rushing	Caleb Mead	19 rushes, 118 yards, TD
New Hampshire	Receiving	Logan Perez	3 receptions, 41 yards
Maine	Passing	Carter Peevy	12-25, 168 yards, TD
Maine	Rushing	Carter Peevy	7 rushes, 43 yards
Maine	Receiving	Trevin Ewing	1 reception, 64 yards

== Roster ==
2024 Maine Black Bears football team roster
Players
Coaches
Offense

Pos.	#	Name	Class
WR	0	Ty'ee Stephens	Fr
WR	2	Trevin Ewing	Jr
WR	4	Molayo Irefin	GS
QB	10	Caden Drezek	So
QB	11	Carter Peevy	GS
QB	12	Noah Carpenter	Fr
RB	12	Evan Wallace	So
WR	13	Aaron Arteaga	So
QB	14	Anthony Harris	Sr
WR	15	Zaheem Crawford-Patterson	So
TE	16	Eli Mahan	Jr
QB	17	Eddie Buehler	Fr
QB	18	Keegan Andrews	Fr
WR	18	Joe Gillette	GS
RB	19	Jaharie Martin	GS
WR	20	Nick Laughlin	Fr
RB	21	Brian Santana-Fis	Jr
RB	25	Tavion Banks	Sr
WR	28	Juelz Russell	Fr
RB	31	Rashawn Marshall	Fr
RB	36	Symon Sathler	So
TE	42	Luke Grigson	Fr
TE	46	Will Grant	Fr
TE	48	Declan McKevitt	Jr
TE	49	Elijah Smalls	Fr
OL	57	Andrew Kocan	So
OL	58	Noah Stanley	Fr
OL	61	Harry Fuller	Fr
OL	62	Pius Ejindu	Fr
OL	63	Evan Schaub	Fr
OL	64	Jack Boutaugh	So
OL	65	Nicolas Cruji	So
OL	66	Kylan Lamke	Fr
OL	68	Max Gregor	So
OL	70	Joe Horn	Jr
OL	71	John Olmstead	GS
OL	72	Tyler Williams	So
OL	74	Anthony Iliano	Fr
OL	75	Liam Reamer	Fr
OL	76	Ayden Chabak	Fr
OL	78	Jack Lillie	Fr
OL	79	Max Lövblad	GS
WR	80	Jamie Lamson	GS
WR	81	Montigo Moss	Sr
TE	82	Cooper Heisey	GS
WR	83	Michael Monios	GS
WR	84	Kevin Jackson	Fr
WR	85	Blake Thomas	Fr
TE	86	Jake Kucera	Fr
TE	87	Francisco Pratts	So
TE	88	Mason Gilbert	GS
WR	89	Gianni Rossitto	So

Defense

Pos.	#	Name	Class
CB	1	Alhaji Kamara	Jr
S	3	Shakur Smalls	Sr
DT	5	John Costanza	Sr
LB	6	Jabari Odoemenem	So
LB	7	Latrell Couchman	Jr
S	8	Robby Riobe	GS
DE	9	Xavier Holmes	Jr
LB	10	Tyshawn Stewart	Jr
LB	11	Christian Thomas	Sr
CB	13	Dede Doegan	Jr
LB	15	Zion Cheeks	So
S	17	Jayden Curry	GS
S	20	Jake Kucera	Fr
DB	21	Brayden Isaiah	Fr
DB	22	Dorian Blackwell	Jr
S	23	Amir Byrd	GS
S	24	Kenneth Cooper	GS
LB	26	Jermaine Baker	GS
CB	27	Jamaree Gibson	So
CB	28	Isaiah Watson	GS
CB	29	Nassir Young	Jr
CB	30	Na'Cire Christmas	Fr
LB	33	Kesean Dyson	GS
CB	34	Daren Omoregie	So
LB	35	Devin Hairston	So
DB	35	Ja'Darius Steele	Fr
S	37	Devin Vaught	Fr
S	38	Sherrod Hudson	So
S	39	Amari Mack	Fr
DT	44	Rayshad Wallace	GS
DE	45	Ta'Kai Chisolm	Fr
DE	47	Jared Tynes	Fr
S	48	Nic Swanson	So
LB	52	Grayson DiPietro	Fr
LB	53	Isaac Ofielu	GS
DL	55	Nathan Lopez	Fr
DE	56	Jacob Tuiasosopo	GS
DT	73	Jace Negley	Fr
DT	90	Jaedin Lee	Fr
DT	91	Shymell Davis	Jr
DT	92	Izaiah Henderson	GS
DE	93	Kye Pressley	Fr
DE	94	Chris Bacon	Fr
DT	95	Mike Hamilton	So
DT	96	Gerald Baker III	Fr
DT	97	Zephron Lester	GS
DL	98	Dillon White	Fr
DE	99	Nicolas Kalume	So
LB		Josh Sparacio	Fr
LB		Tim Crockett	Fr

Special teams

Pos.	#	Name	Class
P	14	Aidan Cadogan	GS
K	40	Joey Bryson	So
K	41	Kemsley Marsters	Fr
K/P	43	Samuel Tremblay	Fr
LS	38	Landon Beal	Fr
LS	49	Zach Zoglio	Sr

Head coach

- Jordan Stevens (Maine)

Coordinators/assistant coaches

- Mikahael Waters (Nevada)
  Offensive coordinator/Quarterbacks
- Umberto di Meo (Springfield)
  Defensive coordinator/Linebackers
- Spencer Carey (Maine)
  Special Teams Coordinator/Cornerbacks
- Pushaun Brown (Maine)
  Running backs/Assistant Special Teams Coordinator/Pro Liaison
- Dave Bucar (Washington & Jefferson)
  Offensive Line/Run Game Coordinator
- John Gardner (Washington)
  Wide Receivers/Recruiting Coordinator
- McCormick Stephenson (Minnesota State)
  Tight Ends
- AJ McLaughlin (Husson)
  Defensive Line
- Jalen Hairston (Charleston)
  Safeties/Defensive Pass Game Coordinator
- Jeb Boudreaux (Stetson)
  Outside Linebackers
- Mike DeVito (Maine)
  Director of Player Development & Alumni Relations
- Trey Hall (Edinboro)
  Head Football Sports Performance Coach
- Nicole Earley (Temple)
  Director of Football Operations
- Thatcher Allen (Springfield)
  Offensive Quality Control/Video Coordinator
- Nathan Kue (Albany)
  Recruiting Assistant
- Julie Cheville
  Athletics Academic Counselor
- Muralee Das
  Faculty Liaison

Legend

- (C) Team captain
- (S) Suspended
- (I) Ineligible
- Injured
- Redshirt

Roster
Last update: September 9, 2024
