= 2024 Bryant Bulldogs football team =

American college football season

2024 Bryant Bulldogs football
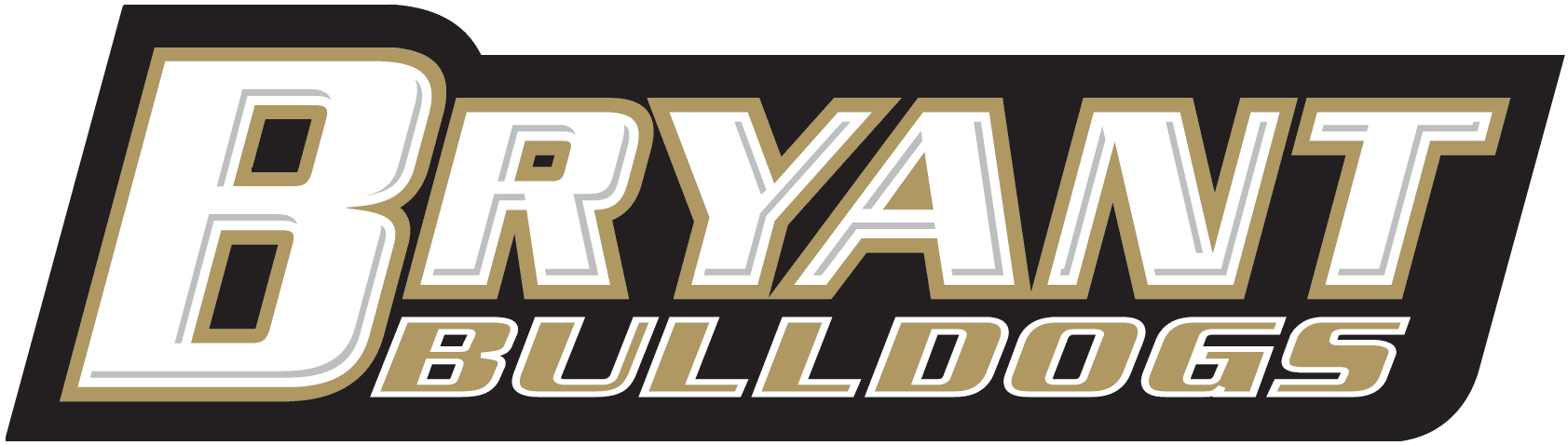
- Conference: CAA Football
- Record: 2–10 (0–8 CAA)
- Head coach: Chris Merritt (6th season)
- Offensive coordinator: Ben McKaig (1st season)
- Defensive coordinator: Anthony Barese (5th season)
- Home stadium: Beirne Stadium

2024 Coastal Athletic Association Football Conference standings
| | Conf. | | | Overall |
| Team | W | | L | W | | L |
|---|---|---|---|---|---|---|
| No. 15 Richmond +^ | 8 | – | 0 | 10 | – | 3 |
| No. 9 Rhode Island* +^ | 7 | – | 1 | 11 | – | 3 |
| No. 12 Villanova ^ | 6 | – | 2 | 10 | – | 4 |
| Delaware* | 6 | – | 2 | 9 | – | 2 |
| No. 23 New Hampshire ^ | 6 | – | 2 | 8 | – | 5 |
| Stony Brook | 5 | – | 3 | 8 | – | 4 |
| Towson | 5 | – | 3 | 7 | – | 5 |
| Elon | 5 | – | 3 | 6 | – | 6 |
| William & Mary | 4 | – | 4 | 7 | – | 5 |
| Monmouth | 4 | – | 4 | 6 | – | 6 |
| Maine | 3 | – | 5 | 5 | – | 7 |
| Albany | 2 | – | 6 | 4 | – | 8 |
| Hampton | 2 | – | 6 | 5 | – | 7 |
| Campbell | 1 | – | 7 | 3 | – | 9 |
| Bryant | 0 | – | 8 | 2 | – | 10 |
| North Carolina A&T | 0 | – | 8 | 1 | – | 11 |
+ – Conference co-champions; ^ – FCS playoff participant; * Delaware ineligible for rankings and 2024 FCS playoffs due to transition to the FBS. Richmond and Rhode Island named co-champions as Rhode Island's only CAA loss was to Delaware.; Rankings from STATS Poll

The 2024 Bryant Bulldogs football team represented Bryant University as a member of the Coastal Athletic Association Football Conference (CAA Football) during the 2024 NCAA Division I FCS football season. The Bulldogs were led by sixth-year head coach Chris Merritt and played their home games at Beirne Stadium in Smithfield, Rhode Island.

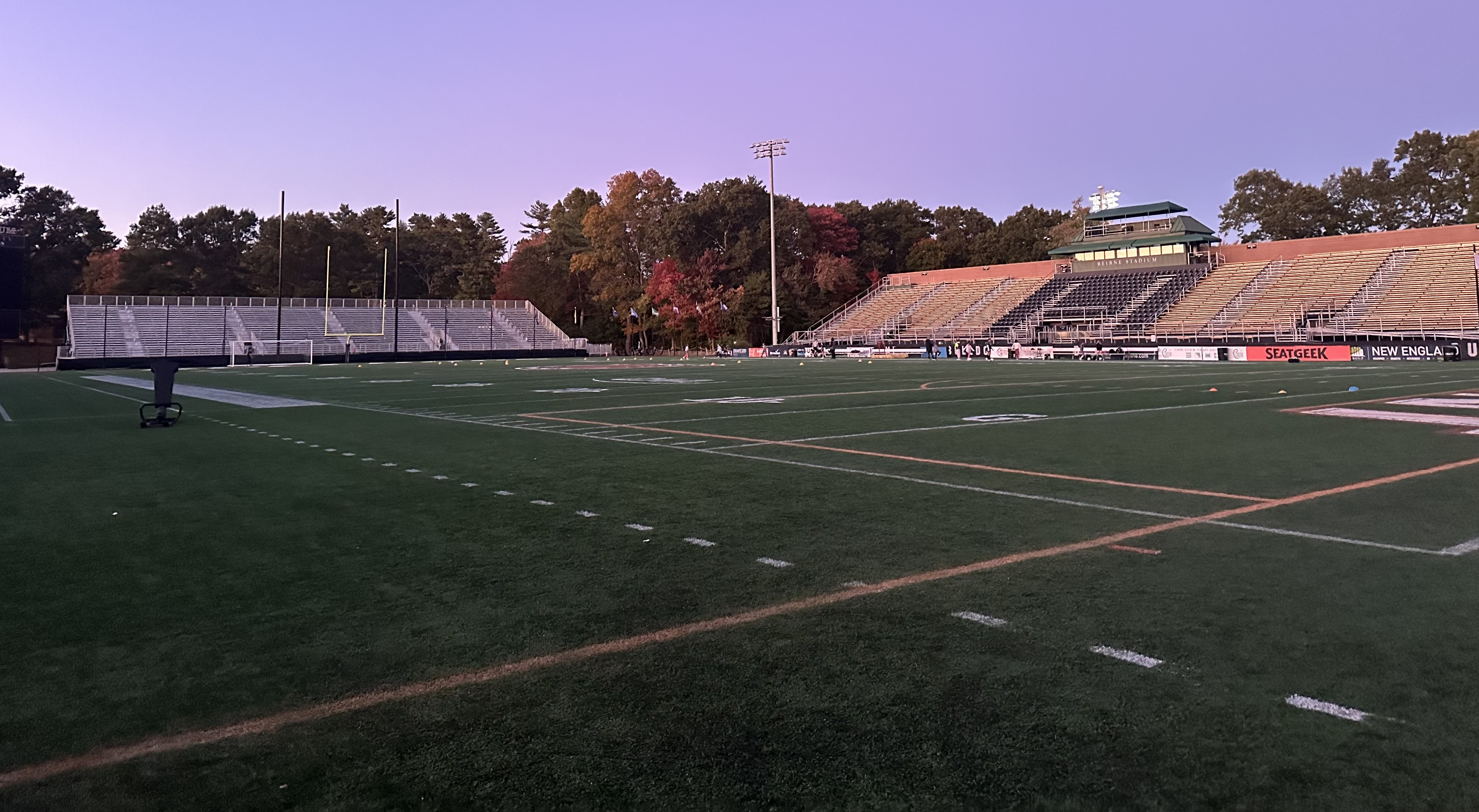
Beirne Stadium after practice during the season.

This season is the team's first as a member of CAA Football after leaving the Big South–OVC Football Association following the 2023 season.

== Schedule ==
| Date | Time | Opponent | Site | TV | Result | Attendance |
|---|---|---|---|---|---|---|
| August 29 | 7:00 p.m. | at Delaware^{[note 1]}* | Delaware Stadium; Newark, DE | FloSports | L 17–48 | 17,244 |
| September 7 | 4:00 p.m. | Franklin Pierce* | Beirne Stadium; Smithfield, RI | FloSports | W 21–17 | N/A |
| September 14 | 2:00 p.m. | Holy Cross*^{†} | Beirne Stadium; Kingston, RI | FloSports | L 22–43 | N/A |
| September 21 | 3:00 p.m. | at New Hampshire | Wildcat Stadium; Durham, NH | FloSports | L 17–38 | 11,302 |
| October 5 | 12:00 p.m. | at Brown* | Richard Gouse Field at Brown Stadium; Providence, RI | ESPN+ | W 42–35 | 3,735 |
| October 12 | 1:00 p.m. | Albany | Beirne Stadium; Smithfield, RI | FloSports | L 17–24 | 1,850 |
| October 19 | 1:00 p.m. | at Monmouth | Kessler Stadium; West Long Branch, NJ | FloSports | L 17–55 | 2,852 |
| October 26 | 12:00 p.m. | No. 18 Richmond | Beirne Stadium; Smithfield, RI | FloSports | L 14–41 | 1,625 |
| November 2 | 1:00 p.m. | No. 20 Stony Brook | Beirne Stadium; Smithfield, RI | FloSports | L 30–31 ^{OT} | 5,200 |
| November 9 | 1:00 p.m. | at Maine | Alfond Sports Stadium; Orono, ME | FloSports | L 26–38 | 5,548 |
| November 16 | 1:00 p.m. | at William & Mary | Zable Stadium; Williamsburg, VA | FloSports | L 12–22 | 7,186 |
| November 23 | 1:00 p.m. | No. 13 Rhode Island | Beirne Stadium; Smithfield, RI | FloSports | L 21–35 | 2,850 |
*Non-conference game; ^{†}Homecoming; Rankings from STATS Poll released prior to the game; All times are in Eastern time

^{[note 1]} The game against Delaware, a fellow member of the CAA, was played as a non-conference game and will not count in the league standings.

== Game summaries ==
=== at Delaware ===
Game One – Bryant Bulldogs (0–0) at Delaware Blue Hens (0–0) – Game summary

| Quarter | 1 | 2 | 3 | 4 | Total |
|---|---|---|---|---|---|
| Bulldogs | 3 | 7 | 0 | 7 | 17 |
| Fightin' Blue Hens | 14 | 20 | 7 | 7 | 48 |

at Delaware Stadium • Newark, DE

- Date: Thursday August 29, 2024
- Game time: 7:00 p.m.
- Game weather: Cloudy
- Game attendance: 17,244
- Referee: Todd Boyd
- TV announcers (FloSports): Jon Mozes (play-by-play) and Fritz Stueber (analyst)

Game information

First quarter

- BRY – Bryce Soli 23-yard field goal, 7:00. Bulldogs 3–0. Drive: 11 plays, 58 yards, 5:20.
- DEL – Phil Lutz 16-yard pass from Ryan O'Connor (Nate Reed kick), 3:19. Blue Hens 7–3. Drive: 9 plays, 78 yards, 3:36.
- DEL – Marcus Yarns 1-yard run (Nate Reed kick), 2:12. Blue Hens 14–3. Drive: 1 play, 1 yard, 0:03.

Second quarter

- DEL – Marcus Yarns 3-yard pass from Ryan O'Connor (Nate Reed kick), 13:30. Blue Hens 21–3. Drive: 6 plays, 56 yards, 1:33.
- BRY – Marc Taglieri Jr. 4-yard pass from Jarrett Guest (Bryce Soli kick), 11:17. Blue Hens 21–10. Drive: 6 plays, 75 yards, 2:13.
- DEL – Jo'Nathan Silver 1-yard run (kick failed), 5:12. Blue Hens 27–10. Drive: 14 plays, 72 yards, 5:59.
- DEL – Nicholas Laboy 11-yard pass from Ryan O'Connor (Nate Reed kick), 0:43. Blue Hens 34–10. Drive: 6 plays, 35 yards, 1:37.

Third quarter

- DEL – Jalyn Witcher 8-yard pass from Ryan O'Connor (Nate Reed kick), 7:02. Blue Hens 41–10. Drive: 12 plays, 96 yards, 5:28.

Fourth quarter

- DEL – Saeed St. Fleur 25-yard run (Nate Reed kick), 12:42. Blue Hens 48–10. Drive: 7 plays, 74 yards, 2:30.
- BRY – Markiel Cockrell 7-yard run (Bryce Soli kick), 1:53. Blue Hens 48–17. Drive: 3 plays, 77 yards, 1:49.

| Statistics | BRY | DEL |
|---|---|---|
| First downs | 19 | 24 |
| Total yards | 319 | 428 |
| Rushing yards | 67 | 183 |
| Passing yards | 252 | 245 |
| Passing: Comp–Att–Int | 20–37–1 | 29–41–0 |
| Time of possession | 31:13 | 28:47 |

| Team | Category | Player | Statistics |
|---|---|---|---|
| Bryant | Passing | Jarrett Guest | 16/29, 146 yards, TD, INT |
| Bryant | Rushing | Fabrice Mukendi | 9 carries, 40 yards |
| Bryant | Receiving | Gary Cooper | 4 receptions, 78 yards |
| Delaware | Passing | Ryan O'Connor | 29/41, 245 yards, 4 TD |
| Delaware | Rushing | Marcus Yarns | 12 carries, 62 yards, TD |
| Delaware | Receiving | Max Patterson | 5 receptions, 53 yards |

=== Franklin Pierce (DII) ===
Game Two – Franklin Pierce Ravens (DII) (0–0) at Bryant Bulldogs (0–1) – Game summary

| Quarter | 1 | 2 | 3 | 4 | Total |
|---|---|---|---|---|---|
| Ravens (DII) | 0 | 0 | 0 | 0 | 0 |
| Bulldogs | 0 | 0 | 0 | 0 | 0 |

at Beirne Stadium • Smithfield, Rhode Island

- Date: September 7, 2024
- Game time: 4:00 p.m.
- TV: FloSports

Game information

First quarter
Second quarter
Third quarter
Fourth quarter

| Statistics | FRA | BRY |
|---|---|---|
| First downs | | |
| Total yards | | |
| Rushing yards | | |
| Passing yards | | |
| Passing: Comp–Att–Int | | |
| Time of possession | | |

| Team | Category | Player | Statistics |
|---|---|---|---|
| Franklin Pierce | Passing | | |
| Franklin Pierce | Rushing | | |
| Franklin Pierce | Receiving | | |
| Bryant | Passing | | |
| Bryant | Rushing | | |
| Bryant | Receiving | | |

=== Holy Cross ===
Game Three – Holy Cross Crusaders (0–2) at Bryant Bulldogs (1–1) – Game summary

| Quarter | 1 | 2 | 3 | 4 | Total |
|---|---|---|---|---|---|
| Crusaders | 0 | 0 | 0 | 0 | 0 |
| Bulldogs | 0 | 0 | 0 | 0 | 0 |

at Beirne Stadium • Smithfield, Rhode Island

- Date: September 14, 2024
- Game time: 2:00 p.m.
- TV: FloSports

Game information

First quarter
Second quarter
Third quarter
Fourth quarter

| Statistics | HC | BRY |
|---|---|---|
| First downs | | |
| Total yards | | |
| Rushing yards | | |
| Passing yards | | |
| Passing: Comp–Att–Int | | |
| Time of possession | | |

| Team | Category | Player | Statistics |
|---|---|---|---|
| Holy Cross | Passing | | |
| Holy Cross | Rushing | | |
| Holy Cross | Receiving | | |
| Bryant | Passing | | |
| Bryant | Rushing | | |
| Bryant | Receiving | | |

=== at New Hampshire ===
Game Four – Bryant Bulldogs (1–2) vs New Hampshire Wildcats (2–1) – Game summary

| Quarter | 1 | 2 | 3 | 4 | Total |
|---|---|---|---|---|---|
| Bulldogs | 0 | 0 | 0 | 0 | 0 |
| Wildcats | 0 | 0 | 0 | 0 | 0 |

at Wildcat Stadium, Durham, NH

- Date: Saturday September 21, 2024
- Game time: 3:00 PM
- TV: FloSports

Game information

First quarter
Second quarter
Third quarter
Fourth quarter

| Statistics | BRY | UNH |
|---|---|---|
| First downs | | |
| Total yards | | |
| Rushing yards | | |
| Passing yards | | |
| Passing: Comp–Att–Int | | |
| Time of possession | | |

| Team | Category | Player | Statistics |
|---|---|---|---|
| Bryant | Passing | | |
| Bryant | Rushing | | |
| Bryant | Receiving | | |
| New Hampshire | Passing | | |
| New Hampshire | Rushing | | |
| New Hampshire | Receiving | | |

=== at Brown ===
Game Five – Bryant Bulldogs (1–3) vs Brown Bears (2–0) – Game summary

| Quarter | 1 | 2 | 3 | 4 | Total |
|---|---|---|---|---|---|
| Bulldogs | 7 | 13 | 0 | 22 | 42 |
| Bears | 7 | 7 | 7 | 14 | 35 |

at Richard Gouse Field at Brown Stadium • Providence, RI

- Date: Saturday October 5, 2024
- Game time: 12:00 p.m.
- Game weather: Cloudy, 72 °F (22 °C)
- Game attendance: 3,735
- Referee: Antonio Marcella
- TV announcers (ESPN+): Scott Cordischi (play-by-play) and John Anderson Jr. (analyst)

Game information

First quarter

- BRY – Aldrich Doe 31-yard pass from Jarret Guest (Bryce Soli kick), 9:10. Bulldogs 7–0. Drive: 11 plays, 78 yards, 5:44.
- BRWN – Qwentin Brown 1-yard run (Christopher Maron kick), 3:01. Tied 7–7. Drive: 10 plays, 52 yards, 2:57.

Second quarter

- BRWN – Qwentin Brown 1-yard run (Christopher Maron kick), 12:30. Bears 14–7. Drive: 11 plays, 62 yards, 3:46.
- BRY – Landon Ruggieri 18-yard pass from Jarrett Guest (Bryce Soli kick), 8:55. Tied 14–14. Drive: 8 plays, 75 yards, 3:35.
- BRY – Bryce Soli 22-yard field goal, 1:55. Bulldogs 17–14. Drive: 12 plays, 65 yards, 5:38.
- BRY – Bryce Soli 27-yard field goal, 0:01. Bulldogs 20–14. Drive: 9 plays, 42 yards, 1:15.

Third quarter

- BRWN – Qwentin Brown 1-yard run (Christopher Maron kick), 4:54. Bears 21–20. Drive: 11 plays, 93 yards, 4:15.

Fourth quarter

- BRY – Landon Ruggieri 38-yard pass from Jarrett Guest (Bryce Soli kick), 14:20. Bulldogs 27–21. Drive: 6 plays, 70 yards, 2:58.
- BRWN – Matt Childs 58-yard pass from Jake Wilcox (Christopher Maron kick), 12:35. Bears 28–27. Drive: 5 plays, 77 yards, 1:38.
- BRY – Dylan Kedzior 46-yard run (Jarrett Guest run), 10:50. Bulldogs 35–28. Drive: 5 plays, 75 yards, 1:45.
- BRWN – Matt Childs 15-yard run (Christopher Maron kick), 4:37. Tied 35–35. Drive: 11 plays, 98 yards, 4:00.
- BRY – Landon Ruggieri 30-yard pass from Jarrett Guest (Bryce Soli kick), 1:45. Bulldogs 42–35. Drive: 8 plays, 63 yards, 2:44.

| Statistics | BRY | BRWN |
|---|---|---|
| First downs | 25 | 24 |
| Total yards | 517 | 462 |
| Rushing yards | 180 | 163 |
| Passing yards | 337 | 299 |
| Passing: Comp–Att–Int | 26–39–0 | 22–41–0 |
| Time of possession | 33:09 | 26:51 |

| Team | Category | Player | Statistics |
|---|---|---|---|
| Bryant | Passing | Jarrett Guest | 26/39, 337 yards, 4 TD |
| Bryant | Rushing | Dylan Kedzior | 11 carries, 93 yards, TD |
| Bryant | Receiving | Landon Ruggieri | 10 receptions, 190 yards, 3 TD |
| Brown | Passing | Jake Wilcox | 21/38, 294 yards, TD |
| Brown | Rushing | Matt Childs | 8 carries, 58 yards, TD |
| Brown | Receiving | Matt Childs | 5 receptions, 93 yards, TD |

=== Albany ===
Game Six – Albany Great Danes (2–3) at Bryant Bulldogs (2–3) – Game summary

| Quarter | 1 | 2 | 3 | 4 | Total |
|---|---|---|---|---|---|
| Great Danes | 0 | 0 | 0 | 0 | 0 |
| Bulldogs | 0 | 0 | 0 | 0 | 0 |

at Beirne Stadium • Smithfield, Rhode Island

- Date: October 12, 2024
- Game time: 1:00 p.m.
- TV: FloSports

Game information

First quarter
Second quarter
Third quarter
Fourth quarter

| Statistics | ALB | BRY |
|---|---|---|
| First downs | | |
| Total yards | | |
| Rushing yards | | |
| Passing yards | | |
| Passing: Comp–Att–Int | | |
| Time of possession | | |

| Team | Category | Player | Statistics |
|---|---|---|---|
| Albany | Passing | | |
| Albany | Rushing | | |
| Albany | Receiving | | |
| Bryant | Passing | | |
| Bryant | Rushing | | |
| Bryant | Receiving | | |

=== at Monmouth ===
Game Seven – Bryant Bulldogs (2–4) at Monmouth Hawks (3–3) – Game summary

| Quarter | 1 | 2 | 3 | 4 | Total |
|---|---|---|---|---|---|
| Bulldogs | 7 | 3 | 0 | 7 | 17 |
| Hawks | 21 | 6 | 14 | 14 | 55 |

at Kessler Field • West Long Branch, NJ

- Date: Saturday October 19, 2024
- Game time: 1:00 PM EST
- Game weather: Sunny, 66 °F (19 °C)
- Game attendance: 2,852
- Referee: Cory Hanson
- TV announcers (FloSports): Eddy Occhipinti (play-by-play) and Emory Hunt (analyst)

Game information

First quarter

- (10:08) MONM – Sone Ntoh 5-yard run (Michael Calton Jr. kick) (Drive: 11 plays, 86 yards, 4:45; Monmouth 7-0)
- (08:22) MONM – TJ Speight 64-yard run (Michael Calton Jr. kick) (Drive: 1 play, 64 yards, 0:12; Monmouth 14-0)
- (04:30) MONM – Sone Ntoh 1-yard run (Michael Calton Jr. kick) (Drive: 6 plays, 57 yards, 2:17; Monmouth 21-0)
- (04:18) BRY - Keylijah Williams 86-yard kickoff return (Bryce Soli kick) (Monmouth 21-7)

Second quarter

- (06:26) MONM – Tra Neal 16-yard pass from Derek Robertson (Michael Calton Jr. PAT failed) (Drive: 5 plays, 74 yards, 1:58; Monmouth 27-7)
- (00:00) BRY - Bryce Soli 41-yard field goal (Drive: 10 plays, 27 yards, 1:25; Monmouth 27-10)

Third quarter

- (08:11) MONM – Sone Ntoh 5-yard run (Michael Calton Jr. kick) (Drive: 14 plays, 93 yards, 5:06; Monmouth 34-10)
- (01:08) MONM – TJ Speight 7-yard pass from Derek Robertson (Michael Calton Jr. kick) (Drive: 8 plays, 51 yards, 3:39; Monmouth 41-10)

Fourth quarter

- (13:48) MONM – Sone Ntoh 2-yard run (Michael Calton Jr. kick) (Drive: 3 plays, 36 yards, 1:12; Monmouth 48-10)
- (07:54) MONM – TJ Speight 10-yard pass from Frankie Savino (Michael Calton Jr. kick) (Drive: 5 plays, 34 yards, 2:47; Monmouth 55-10)
- (05:29) BRY – Drew Montez 6-yard pass from Brennan Myer (Bryce Soli kick) (Drive: 7 plays, 25 yards, 2:13; Monmouth 55-17)

| Statistics | BRY | MONM |
|---|---|---|
| First downs | 16 | 34 |
| Total yards | 303 | 584 |
| Rushing yards | 103 | 328 |
| Passing yards | 200 | 256 |
| Passing: Comp–Att–Int | 20–38–2 | 24–31–0 |
| Time of possession | 27:46 | 32:14 |

| Team | Category | Player | Statistics |
|---|---|---|---|
| Bryant | Passing | Brennan Myer | 7/12, 105 yards, TD, 2 INT |
| Bryant | Rushing | Fabrice Mukendi | 10 carries, 77 yards |
| Bryant | Receiving | Landon Ruggieri | 5 receptions, 95 yards |
| Monmouth | Passing | Derek Robertson | 22/29, 237 yards, 2 TD |
| Monmouth | Rushing | Rodney Nelson | 16 carries, 101 yards |
| Monmouth | Receiving | Josh Derry | 7 receptions, 83 yards |

=== No. 18 Richmond ===
Game Eight – No. 18 Richmond Spiders (5–2) at Bryant Bulldogs (2–5) – Game summary

| Quarter | 1 | 2 | 3 | 4 | Total |
|---|---|---|---|---|---|
| No. 18 Spiders | 13 | 28 | 0 | 0 | 41 |
| Bulldogs | 7 | 0 | 0 | 7 | 14 |

at Beirne Stadium • Smithfield, Rhode Island

- Date: Saturday October 26, 2024
- Game time: 12:00 p.m.
- Game weather: Sunny • Temperature: 60 °F (16 °C)
- Game attendance: 1,625
- TV: FloSports/MASN

Game information

First quarter
Second quarter
Third quarter
Fourth quarter

| Statistics | RICH | BRY |
|---|---|---|
| First downs | 25 | 15 |
| Total yards | 527 | 234 |
| Rushing yards | 226 | 113 |
| Passing yards | 301 | 121 |
| Passing: Comp–Att–Int | 19–20–0 | 8–16–1 |
| Time of possession | 35:25 | 24:35 |

| Team | Category | Player | Statistics |
|---|---|---|---|
| Richmond | Passing | Camden Coleman | 15–16, 278 yards, 4 TD |
| Richmond | Rushing | Aziz Foster-Powell | 12 carries, 76 yards |
| Richmond | Receiving | Nick DeGennaro | 7 receptions, 162 yards, TD |
| Bryant | Passing | Brennan Myer | 8–16, 121 yards, 2 TD |
| Bryant | Rushing | Drew Montez | 1 carry, 30 yards |
| Bryant | Receiving | Landon Ruggieri | 3 receptions, 51 yards |

=== No. 20 Stony Brook ===
Game Nine – No. 20 Stony Brook Seawolves (6–2) at Bryant Bulldogs (2–6) – Game summary

| Quarter | 1 | 2 | 3 | 4 | OT | Total |
|---|---|---|---|---|---|---|
| No. 20 Seawolves | 10 | 7 | 7 | 0 | 7 | 31 |
| Bulldogs | 0 | 7 | 10 | 7 | 6 | 30 |

at Beirne Stadium • Smithfield, Rhode Island

- Date: Saturday November 2, 2024
- Game time: 1:00 p.m.
- Game weather: Sunny
- Game attendance: 5,200
- Referee: Todd Boys
- TV announcers (FloSports): Jake Zimmer (play-by-play) and Tim Lynch (analyst)

Game information

First quarter

- (11:11) SBU – Roland Dempster 5-yard run, Enda Kirby Kick (Drive: 9 plays, 75 yards, 3:49; Stony Brook 7–0)
- (5:04) SBU – Enda Kirby 36-yard field goal (Drive: 9 plays, 42 yards, 2:51; Stony Brook 10–0)

Second quarter

- (6:07) BRY – Landon Ruggieri 15-yard pass from Brennan Myer, Bryce Soli kick (Drive: 14 plays, 99 yards, 6:44; Stony Brook 10–7)
- (1:55) SBU – Johnny Martin 1-yard rn, Enda Kirby kick (Drive: 9 plays, 69 yards, 4:06; Stony Brook 17–7)

Third quarter

- (11:02) BRY – Bryce Soli 30-yard field goal (Drive: 9 plays, 62 yards, 3:58; Stony Brook 17–10)
- (9:16) SBU – Jayce Freeman 40-yard pass from Tyler Knoop, Enda Kirby kick (Drive: 5 plays, 69 yards, 1:40; Stony Brook 24–10)
- (9:04) BRY – Markiel Cockrell 75-yard run, Bryce Soli kick (Drive: 1 play, 75 yards, 0:12; Stony Brook 24–17)

Fourth quarter

- (13:32) BRY – Tristen Riley 19-yard pass from Brennan Myer, Bryce Soli kick (Drive: 3 plays, 25 yards, 1:15; Tied 24–24)

Overtime

- SBU – Roland Dempster 2-yard run, Enda Kirby kick (Drive: 4 plays, 25 yards; Stony Brook 31–24)
- BRY – Landon Ruggieri 25-yard pass from Brennan Myer, two-point conversion failed (Drive: 1 plays, 25 yards; Stony Brook 31–30)

| Statistics | STBK | BRY |
|---|---|---|
| First downs | 26 | 21 |
| Total yards | 432 | 443 |
| Rushing yards | 147 | 105 |
| Passing yards | 285 | 338 |
| Passing: Comp–Att–Int | 23–30–0 | 28–40–1 |
| Time of possession | 31:57 | 28:03 |

| Team | Category | Player | Statistics |
|---|---|---|---|
| Stony Brook | Passing | Tyler Knoop | 23/30, 285 yards, TD |
| Stony Brook | Rushing | Roland Dempster | 25 carries, 107 yards, 2 TD |
| Stony Brook | Receiving | Jasiah Williams | 10 receptions, 96 yards |
| Bryant | Passing | Brennan Myer | 28/39, 338 yards, 3 TD, INT |
| Bryant | Rushing | Markiel Cockrell | 4 carries, 79 yards, TD |
| Bryant | Receiving | Dylan Kedzior | 9 receptions, 100 yards |

=== at Maine ===
Game Ten – Bryant Bulldogs (2–7) at Maine Black Bears (4–5) – Game summary

| Quarter | 1 | 2 | 3 | 4 | Total |
|---|---|---|---|---|---|
| Bulldogs | 0 | 0 | 20 | 6 | 26 |
| Black Bears | 14 | 21 | 3 | 0 | 38 |

at Alfond Sports Stadium • Orono, ME

- Date: Saturday November 9, 2024
- Game time: 1:00 PM EST
- Game weather: 44 °F (7 °C)
- Game attendance: 5,548
- TV announcers (FloSports): TBD

Game information

First quarter
Second quarter
Third quarter
Fourth quarter

| Statistics | BRY | ME |
|---|---|---|
| First downs | 25 | 19 |
| Total yards | 356 | 435 |
| Rushing yards | 105 | 166 |
| Passing yards | 251 | 269 |
| Passing: Comp–Att–Int | 23–41–2 | 19–24–0 |
| Time of possession | 28:41 | 31:19 |

| Team | Category | Player | Statistics |
|---|---|---|---|
| Bryant | Passing | Brennan Myer | 23-41, 251 yards, 4 TD, 2 INT |
| Bryant | Rushing | Dylan Kedzior | 16 carries, 60 yards |
| Bryant | Receiving | Markiel Cockrell | 4 receptions, 71 yards |
| Maine | Passing | Carter Peevy | 19-24, 269 yards, 4 TD |
| Maine | Rushing | Brian Santana-Fis | 13 carries, 104 yards, TD |
| Maine | Receiving | Montigo Moss | 7 receptions, 122 yards, 2 TD |

=== at William & Mary ===
Game Eleven – Bryant Bulldogs (2–8) vs William & Mary Tribe (6–4) – Game summary

| Quarter | 1 | 2 | 3 | 4 | Total |
|---|---|---|---|---|---|
| Bulldogs | 0 | 9 | 3 | 0 | 12 |
| Tribe | 8 | 7 | 0 | 7 | 22 |

at Zable Stadium, Williamsburg, VA

- Date: Saturday November 16, 2024
- Game time: 1:00 PM
- TV: FloSports

Game information

First quarter
Second quarter
Third quarter
Fourth quarter

| Statistics | BRY | W&M |
|---|---|---|
| First downs | | |
| Total yards | | |
| Rushing yards | | |
| Passing yards | | |
| Passing: Comp–Att–Int | | |
| Time of possession | | |

| Team | Category | Player | Statistics |
|---|---|---|---|
| Bryant | Passing | | |
| Bryant | Rushing | | |
| Bryant | Receiving | | |
| William & Mary | Passing | | |
| William & Mary | Rushing | | |
| William & Mary | Receiving | | |

=== No. 13 Rhode Island ===
Game Twelve – No. 13 Rhode Island Rams (9–2) at Bryant Bulldogs (2–9) – Game summary

| Quarter | 1 | 2 | 3 | 4 | Total |
|---|---|---|---|---|---|
| No. 13 Rams | 3 | 10 | 15 | 7 | 35 |
| Bulldogs | 0 | 14 | 0 | 7 | 21 |

at Beirne Stadium • Smithfield, Rhode Island

- Date: Saturday November 23, 2024
- Game time: 1:00 p.m.
- Game weather: Rain • Temperature: 44 °F (7 °C) • Wind NW 14 mph
- Game attendance: 2,850
- Referee: Alex Parrella
- TV: FloSports

Game information

First quarter

- (1:32) URI – Ty Groff 25-yard field goal (Drive: 11 plays, 49 yards, 4:42; Rhode Island 3–0)

Second quarter

- (14:50) URI – Ty Groff 38-yard field goal (Drive: 4 plays, 3 yards, 0:40; Rhode Island 6–0)
- (10:02) BRY – Drew Montez 11-yard pass from Brennan Myer (Bryce Soli kick) (Drive: 9 plays, 65 yards, 4:48; Bryant 7–6)
- (4:38) URI – Malik Grant 13-yard run (Ty Groff kick) (Drive: 10 plays, 65 yards, 5:24; Rhode Island 13–7)
- (2:03) BRY – Dylan Kedzior 50-yard run (Bryce Soli kick) (Drive: 6 plays, 70 yards, 2:28; Bryant 14–13)

Third quarter

- (11:28) URI – Malik Grant 4-yard pass from Hunter Helms (Ty Groff kick) (Drive: 6 plays, 60 yards, 3:23; Rhode Island 20–14)
- (6:07) URI – Malik Grant 1-yard run (Marquis Buchanan run from 2-point conversion) (Drive: 6 plays, 47 yards, 3:12; Rhode Island 28–14)

Fourth quarter

- (11:05) BRY – Landon Ruggieri 14-yard pass from Brennan Myer (Bryce Soli kick) (Drive: 18 plays, 88 yards, 9:51; Rhode Island 28–21)
- (2:43) URI – Malik Grant 2-yard run (Ty Groff kick) (Drive: 13 plays, 75 yards, 8:22; Rhode Island 35–21)

| Statistics | URI | BRY |
|---|---|---|
| First downs | 26 | 16 |
| Total yards | 425 | 316 |
| Rushing yards | 216 | 104 |
| Passing yards | 209 | 212 |
| Passing: Comp–Att–Int | 19–29–1 | 18–30–2 |
| Time of possession | 34:55 | 25:05 |

| Team | Category | Player | Statistics |
|---|---|---|---|
| Rhode Island | Passing | Hunter Helms | 19/29, 209 yards, TD, INT |
| Rhode Island | Rushing | Malik Grant | 37 carries, 204 yards, 3 TD |
| Rhode Island | Receiving | Marquis Buchanan | 8 receptions, 84 yards |
| Bryant | Passing | Brennan Myer | 15/24, 189 yards, 2 TD, 2 INT |
| Bryant | Rushing | Dylan Kedzior | 10 carries, 80 yards, TD |
| Bryant | Receiving | Landon Ruggieri | 8 receptions, 105 yards, TD |
