= 2024 Monmouth Hawks football team =

American college football season

2024 Monmouth Hawks football
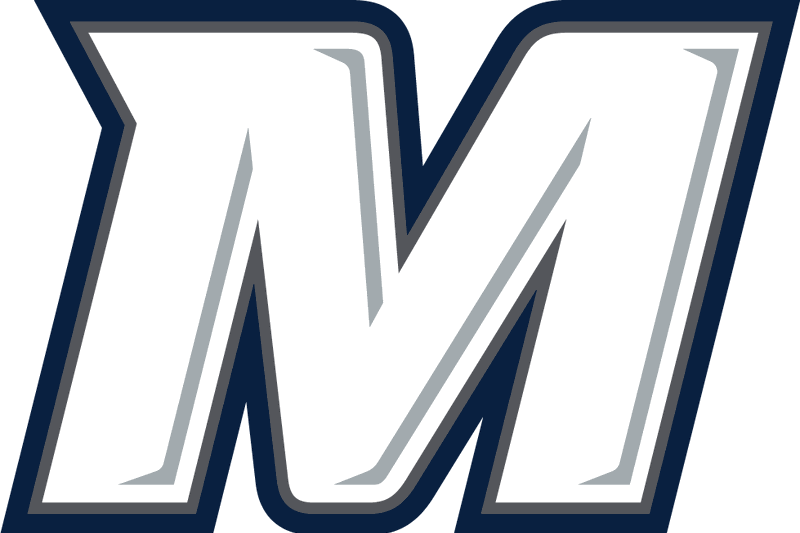
- Conference: CAA Football
- Record: 6–6 (4–4 CAA)
- Head coach: Kevin Callahan (32nd season)
- Offensive coordinator: Jeff Gallo (6th season)
- Offensive scheme: Air raid
- Defensive coordinator: Lewis Walker (1st season)
- Base defense: Multiple
- Home stadium: Kessler Stadium

2024 Coastal Athletic Association Football Conference standings
	Conf.			Overall
Team	W		L	W		L
No. 15 Richmond +^	8	–	0	10	–	3
No. 9 Rhode Island* +^	7	–	1	11	–	3
No. 12 Villanova ^	6	–	2	10	–	4
Delaware*	6	–	2	9	–	2
No. 23 New Hampshire ^	6	–	2	8	–	5
Stony Brook	5	–	3	8	–	4
Towson	5	–	3	7	–	5
Elon	5	–	3	6	–	6
William & Mary	4	–	4	7	–	5
Monmouth	4	–	4	6	–	6
Maine	3	–	5	5	–	7
Albany	2	–	6	4	–	8
Hampton	2	–	6	5	–	7
Campbell	1	–	7	3	–	9
Bryant	0	–	8	2	–	10
North Carolina A&T	0	–	8	1	–	11
+ – Conference co-champions; ^ – FCS playoff participant; * Delaware ineligible for rankings and 2024 FCS playoffs due to transition to the FBS. Richmond and Rhode Island named co-champions as Rhode Island's only CAA loss was to Delaware.; Rankings from STATS Poll

The 2024 Monmouth Hawks football team represented Monmouth University in the Coastal Athletic Association Football Conference (CAA) during the 2024 NCAA Division I FCS football season. The Hawks were coached by 32nd-year head coach Kevin Callahan and played home games at Kessler Stadium in West Long Branch, New Jersey.

== Schedule ==
Date	Time	Opponent	Site	TV	Result	Attendance
August 29	9:00 p.m.	at Eastern Washington*	Roos Field; Cheney, WA	ESPN+	L 27–42	4,612
September 7	12:00 p.m.	No. 19 Lafayette*	Kessler Field; West Long Branch, NJ	FloSports	L 35–40	N/A
September 14	3:30 p.m.	at Maine	Alfond Stadium; Orono, ME	FloSports	W 51–22	4,574
September 21	6:00 p.m.	at FIU*	Pitbull Stadium; Miami, FL	ESPN+	W 45–42	17,922
September 28	1:00 p.m.	Fordham*	Kessler Field; West Long Branch, NJ	FloSports	W 63–21	3,368
October 5	1:00 p.m.	Delaware	Kessler Field; West Long Branch, NJ	FloSports	L 35–42	3,374
October 19	1:00 p.m.	Bryant^{†}	Kessler Field; West Long Branch, NJ	FloSports	W 55–17	2,852
October 26	1:00 p.m.	Towson	Kessler Field; West Long Branch, NJ	FloSports	L 14–26	2,372
November 2	1:00 p.m.	at No. 14 Rhode Island	Meade Stadium; Kingston, RI	FloSports	L 28–37	5,674
November 9	1:00 p.m.	at New Hampshire	Wildcat Stadium; Durham, NH	FloSports	L 20–33	5,108
November 16	12:00 p.m.	No. 9 Villanova	Kessler Field; West Long Branch, NJ	FloSports	W 40–33	2,856
November 23	1:00 p.m.	at No. 18 Stony Brook	Kenneth P. LaValle Stadium; Stony Brook, NY	FloSports	W 55–47	5,263
*Non-conference game; ^{†}Homecoming; Rankings from STATS Poll released prior to the game; All times are in Eastern time

== Game summaries ==
=== at Eastern Washington ===
Game One – Monmouth Hawks (0–0) at Eastern Washington Eagles (0–0) – Game summary

Quarter	1	2	3	4	Total
Hawks	7	7	0	13	27
Eagles	14	14	7	7	42

at Roos Field • Cheney, WA

- Date: Thursday August 29, 2024
- Game time: 9:00 PM EST
- Game weather: Sunny, 77 °F (25 °C)
- Game attendance: 4,612
- Referee: Robert Quello
- TV announcers (ESPN+): Austin Getz, Bill Adams

Game information

First quarter

- (11:46) EWU – Efton Chism III 30-yard pass from Kekoa Visperas (Soren McKee kick) (Drive: 8 plays, 77 yards, 3:09; Eastern Washington 7–0)
- (05:35) EWU – Jared Taylor 9-yard run (Soren McKee kick) (Drive: 9 plays, 80 yards, 4:10; Eastern Washington 14–0)
- (01:42) MONM – Sone Ntoh 2-yard run (Michael Calton Jr. kick) (Drive: 8 plays, 75 yards, 3:35; Eastern Washington 14–7)

Second quarter

- (09:46) MONM – Josh Derry 48-yard pass from Derek Robertson (Michael Calton Jr. kick) (Drive: 8 plays, 95 yards, 3:55; 14-14)
- (04:23) EWU – Nolan Ulm 4-yard pass from Kekoa Visperas (Soren McKee kick) (Drive: 10 plays, 74 yards, 4:37; Eastern Washington 21-14)
- (00:23) EWU – Miles Williams 14-yard pass from Kekoa Visperas (Soren McKee kick) (Drive: 11 plays, 74 yards, 2:18; Eastern Washington 28-14)

Third quarter

- (05:51) EWU – Efton Chism 12-yard pass from Kekoa Visperas (Soren McKee kick) (Drive: 10 plays, 65 yards, 5:02; Eastern Washington 35-14)

Fourth quarter

- (12:16) EWU – Efton Chism 16-yard pass from Kekoa Visperas (Soren McKee kick) (Drive: 13 plays, 76 yards, 6:25; Eastern Washington 42-14)
- (11:15) MONM – Jack Neri 21-yard pass from Derek Robertson (Michael Calton Jr. kick) (Drive: 4 plays, 75 yards, 1:01; Eastern Washington 42-21)
- (11:15) MONM – Maxwell James 19-yard pass from Derek Robertson (Two-point pass conversion failed) (Drive: 9 plays, 89 yards, 2:34; Eastern Washington 42-27)

Statistics	MONM	EWU
First downs	24	31
Total yards	439	547
Rushing yards	49	265
Passing yards	390	282
Passing: Comp–Att–Int	27-42-1	26-29-0
Time of possession	22:42	37:18

Team	Category	Player	Statistics
Monmouth	Passing	Derek Robertson	27/42, 390 yards, 3 TD, INT
Monmouth	Rushing	Makhi Green	6 carries, 17 yards
Monmouth	Receiving	TJ Speight	5 receptions, 97 yards
Eastern Washington	Passing	Kekoa Visperas	25/28, 275 yards, 5 TD
Eastern Washington	Rushing	Tuna Altahir	16 carries, 108 yards
Eastern Washington	Receiving	Efton Chism III	12 receptions, 173 yards, 3 TD

=== No. 19 Lafayette ===
Game Two – No. 19 Lafayette Leopards (0–1) at Monmouth Hawks (0–1) – Game summary

Quarter	1	2	3	4	Total
No. 19 Leopards	7	7	7	19	40
Hawks	7	7	0	21	35

at Kessler Field • West Long Branch, NJ

- Date: Saturday September 7, 2024
- Game time: 12:00 PM EST
- Game weather: Cloudy, 73 °F (23 °C)
- Game attendance: 2,504
- Referee: Justin Ackley
- TV announcers (FloSports): Matt Harmon (play-by-play) and Emory Hunt (analyst)

Game information

First quarter

- (12:16) LAF – Jamar Curtis 9-yard run (Jack Simonetta kick) (Drive: 11 plays, 83 yards, 3:52; Lafayette 7-0)
- (03:06) MONM – Josh Derry 23-yard pass from Derek Robertson (Michael Calton Jr. kick) (Drive: 7 plays, 75 yards, 3:53; 7-7)

Second quarter

- (13:01) LAF – Troy Bruce 6-yard (Jack Simonetta kick) (Drive: 13 plays, 75 yards, 5:05; Lafayette 14-7)
- (06:34) MONM – Max James 5-yard pass from Derek Robertson (Michael Calton Jr. kick) (Drive: 13 plays, 81 yards, 6:21; 14-14)

Third quarter

- (07:19) LAF – Jamar Curtis 2-yard run (Jack Simonetta kick) (Drive: 16 plays, 75 yards, 7:41; Lafayette 21-14)

Fourth quarter

- (14:50) MONM – Tra Neal 2-yard pass from Derek Robertson (Michael Calton Jr. kick) (Drive: 14 plays, 78 yards, 7:23; 21-21)
- (11:20) MONM – TJ Speight 89-yard pass from Derek Robertson (Michael Calton Jr. kick) (Drive: 1 play, 89 yards, 0:13; Monmouth 28-21)
- (06:25) LAF – Jamar Curtis 2-yard run (Jack Simonetta kick) (Drive: 11 plays, 75 yards, 4:49; 28-28)
- (01:54) MONM – Sone Ntoh 17-yard run (Michael Calton Jr. kick) (Drive: 10 plays, 80 yards, 4:24; Monmouth 35-28)
- (00:53) LAF – Chris Carasia 12-yard pass from Dean DeNobile (Two-point pass conversion failed) (Drive: 4 plays, 81 yards, 0:59; Monmouth 35-34)
- (00:36) LAF – Elijah Steward 42-yard pass from Dean DeNobile (Two-point pass conversion failed) (Drive: 2 plays, 51 yards, 0:15; Lafayette 40-35)

Statistics	LAF	MONM
First downs	29	21
Total yards	526	429
Rushing yards	132	74
Passing yards	394	355
Passing: Comp–Att–Int	31–45–0	24–36–2
Time of possession	33:33	26:27

Team	Category	Player	Statistics
Lafayette	Passing	Dean DeNobile	31/45, 394 yards, 2 TD
Lafayette	Rushing	Jamar Curtis	21 carries, 87 yards, 3 TD
Lafayette	Receiving	Elijah Steward	15 receptions, 244 yards, TD
Monmouth	Passing	Derek Robertson	24/36, 355 yards, 4 TD, 2 INT
Monmouth	Rushing	Sone Ntoh	10 carries, 50 yards, TD
Monmouth	Receiving	TJ Speight	3 receptions, 97 yards, TD

=== at Maine ===
Game Three – Monmouth Hawks (0–2) at Maine Black Bears (1–1) – Game summary

Quarter	1	2	3	4	Total
Hawks	20	7	14	10	51
Black Bears	8	0	7	7	22

at Alfond Stadium • Orono, ME

- Date: Saturday September 14, 2024
- Game time: 3:30 PM EST
- Game weather: Sunny, 78 °F (26 °C), Wind: S @ 5 mph
- Game attendance: 4,574
- Referee: Jeremy DeAngulo
- TV announcers (FloSports): Rich Kimball (play-by-play) and Bob Lucy (analyst)

Game information

First quarter

- (08:01) MONM – Sone Ntoh 4-yard run (Michael Calton Jr. kick) (Drive: 16 plays, 75 yards, 6:59; Monmouth 7-0)
- (02:58) MONM – Jack Neri 11-yard pass from Derek Robertson (Two-point pass conversion failed) (Drive: 10 plays, 76 yards, 3:23; Monmouth 13-0)
- (01:02) MONM – Marcus Middleton 25-yard pass from Derek Robertson (Michael Calton Jr. kick) (Drive: 3 plays, 54 yards, 0:42; Monmouth 20-0)
- (00:57) ME – Trevin Ewing 98-yard kickoff return (Carter Peevy pass to Declan McKevitt for two-point conversion) (Drive: 4 plays, 17 yards, 1:25; Monmouth 20-8)

Second quarter

- (04:51) MONM – Sone Ntoh 2-yard run (Michael Calton Jr. kick) (Drive: 12 plays, 62 yards, 4:40; Monmouth 27-8)

Third quarter

- (12:02) MONM – Josh Derry 56-yard pass from Derek Robertson (Michael Calton Jr. kick) (Drive: 4 plays, 67 yards, 1:57; Monmouth 34-8)
- (06:51) ME - Jaharie Martin 1-yard run (Samuel Tremblay kick) (Drive: 8 plays, 65 yards, 5:11; Monmouth 34-15)
- (03:36) MONM – Rodney Nelson 24-yard run (Michael Calton Jr. kick) (Drive: 6 plays, 84 yards, 3:14; Monmouth 41-15)

Fourth quarter

- (06:51) ME - Joe Gillette 2-yard run (Samuel Tremblay kick) (Drive: 8 plays, 56 yards, 4:10; Monmouth 41-22)
- (13:55) MONM – Josh Derry 94-yard pass from Derek Robertson (Michael Calton Jr. kick) (Drive: 1 play, 94 yards, 0;13; Monmouth 48-22)
- (04:09 MONM – Michael Calton Jr. 42-yard field goal (Drive: 11 plays, 47 yards, 5:21; Monmouth 51-22)

Statistics	MONM	ME
First downs	31	17
Total yards	632	286
Rushing yards	242	128
Passing yards	390	158
Passing: Comp–Att–Int	22-37-0	17-28-0
Time of possession	33:04	26:56

Team	Category	Player	Statistics
Monmouth	Passing	Derek Robertson	22/36, 390 yards, 4 TD
Monmouth	Rushing	Rodney Nelson	14 carries, 91 yards, TD
Monmouth	Receiving	Josh Derry	7 receptions, 227 yards, 2 TD
Maine	Passing	Carter Peevy	16/26, 159 yards
Maine	Rushing	Jaharie Martin	11 carries, 46 yards, TD
Maine	Receiving	Montigo Moss	7 receptions, 53 yards

=== at FIU (FBS) ===
Game Four – Monmouth Hawks (1–2) at FIU Panthers (FBS) (1–2) – Game summary

Quarter	1	2	3	4	Total
Hawks	7	14	14	10	45
Panthers (FBS)	14	14	7	7	42

at Pitbull Stadium • Miami, FL

- Date: Saturday September 21, 2024
- Game time: 6:00 PM EST
- Game weather: Sunny, 90 °F (32 °C), Wind: N @ 9 mph
- Game attendance: 17,922
- Referee: Garrett Dickerson
- TV announcers (ESPN+): Steve Goldstein (Play-by-play), Corey Brooks (Analyst)

Game information

First quarter

- 09:53 FIU - Travion Barnes 85-yard interception return (Alejandro Prado kick) (Drive: 10 plays, 57 yards, 05:07; FIU 7-0)
- 04:49 FIU - Dean Patterson 1-yard pass from Keyone Jenkins (Alejandro Prado kick) (Drive: 8 plays, 57 yards, 03:33; FIU 14-0)
- 01:44 MONM - Sone Ntoh 30-yard run (Michael Calton Jr. kick) (Drive: 8 plays, 81 yards, 03:00; FIU 14-7)

Second quarter

- 10:53 FIU - Kejon Owens 2-yard run (Alejandro Prado kick) (Drive: 6 plays, 67 yards, 03:01; FIU 21-7)
- 07:03 MONM - Sone Ntoh 3-yard run (Michael Calton Jr. kick) (Drive: 9 plays, 68 yards, 03:43; FIU 21-14)
- 06:01 FIU - Juju Lewis 42-yard pass from Keyone Jenkins (Alejandro Prado kick) (Drive: 3 plays, 75 yards, 01:02; FIU 28-14)
- 01:49 MONM - TJ Speight 4-yard pass from Derek Robertson (Michael Calton Jr. kick) (Drive: 12 plays, 75 yards, 04:07; FIU 28-21)

Third quarter

- 11:10 MONM - Gavin Nelson 4-yard pass from Derek Robertson (Michael Calton Jr. kick) (Drive: 6 plays, 60 yards, 02:00; 28-28)
- 08:07 FIU - Dean Patterson 8-yard run (Alejandro Prado kick) (Drive: 6 plays, 70 yards, 02:57; FIU 35-28)
- 04:37 MONM - Rodney Nelson 59-yard run (Michael Calton Jr. kick) (Drive: 3 plays, 78 yards, 01:11; 35-35)

Fourth quarter

- 13:24 MONM - Sone Ntoh 1-yard run (Michael Calton Jr. kick) (Drive: 10 plays, 53 yards, 03:39; MONM 42-35)
- 10:12 FIU - Kejon Owens 12-yard run (Alejandro Prado kick) (Drive: 6 plays, 64 yards, 03:05; 42-42)
- 01:52 MONM - Michael Calton Jr. 43-yard field goal (Drive: 7 plays, 13 yards, 03:11; MONM 45-42)

Statistics	MONM	FIU
First downs	24	21
Total yards	540	475
Rushing yards	179	113
Passing yards	361	362
Passing: Comp–Att–Int	35-51-1	23-32-0
Time of possession	34:24	25:36

Team	Category	Player	Statistics
Monmouth	Passing	Derek Robertson	35/51, 361 yards, 2 TD, INT
Monmouth	Rushing	Rodney Nelson	14 carries, 117 yards, TD
Monmouth	Receiving	Josh Derry	7 receptions, 108 yards
FIU	Passing	Keyone Jenkins	23/32, 362 yards, 2 TD
FIU	Rushing	Kejon Owens	11 carries, 57 yards, 2 TD
FIU	Receiving	Eric Rivers	5 receptions, 101 yards

=== Fordham ===
Game Five – Fordham Rams (0–4) at Monmouth Hawks (2–2) – Game summary

Quarter	1	2	3	4	Total
Rams	7	7	0	7	21
Hawks	14	35	14	0	63

at Kessler Field • West Long Branch, NJ

- Date: Saturday September 28, 2024
- Game time: 1:00 PM EST
- Game weather: Rain, 68 °F (20 °C), Wind: SE @ 20 mph
- Game attendance: 3,368
- Referee: Antonio Marcella
- TV announcers (FloSports): Matt Harmon (play-by-play) and Emory Hunt (analyst)

Game information

First quarter

- (14:46) MONM – Makhi Green 100-yard kickoff return (Michael Calton Jr. kick) (Drive: 13 plays, 72 yards, 6:01; Monmouth 7-0)
- (08:45) FOR – Julius Loughridge 9-yard run (Bennett Henderson kick) (Drive: 13 plays, 72 yards, 6:01; 7-7)
- (03:13) MONM – Sone Ntoh 1-yard run (Michael Calton Jr. kick) (Drive: 11 plays, 87 yards, 5:32; Monmouth 14-7)

Second quarter

- (14:07) MONM – Sone Ntoh 3-yard run (Michael Calton Jr. kick) (Drive: 10 plays, 70 yards, 2:58; Monmouth 21-7)
- (10:45) MONM – Rodney Nelson 26-yard run (Michael Calton Jr. kick) (Drive: 4 plays, 73 yards, 1:29; Monmouth 28-7)
- (09:48) MONM – Sone Ntoh 64-yard run (Michael Calton Jr. kick) (Drive: 1 play, 64 yards, 0:10; Monmouth 35-7)
- (04:57) FOR – Julius Loughridge 8-yard run (Bennett Henderson kick) (Drive: 10 plays, 75 yards, 4:51; Monmouth 35-14)
- (04:44) MONM – TJ Speight 79-yard kickoff return (Michael Calton Jr. kick) (Drive: 3 plays, 6 yards, 1:31; Monmouth 42-14)
- (00;33) MONM – Sone Ntoh 7-yard run (Michael Calton Jr. kick) (Drive: 6 plays, 57 yards, 2:40; Monmouth 49-14)

Third quarter

- (11:41) MONM – Tra Neal 27-yard pass from Derek Robertson (Michael Calton Jr. kick) (Drive: 5 play, 45 yards, 2:31; Monmouth 56-14)
- (04:50) MONM – Sone Ntoh 2-yard run (Michael Calton Jr. kick) (Drive: 6 play, 53 yards, 3:15; Monmouth 63-14)

Fourth quarter

- (12:40) FOR – Jack Freeburg 35-yard pass from Jack Capaldi (Bennett Henderson kick) (Drive: 10 plays, 80 yards, 3:41; Monmouth 63-21)

Statistics	FOR	MONM
First downs	18	24
Total yards	278	581
Rushing yards	180	407
Passing yards	98	174
Passing: Comp–Att–Int	11–23–0	12–15–0
Time of possession	28:31	31:29

Team	Category	Player	Statistics
Fordham	Passing	Jack Capaldi	11/23, 98 yards, TD
Fordham	Rushing	Julius Loughridge	24 carries, 97 yards, 2 TD
Fordham	Receiving	Jack Freeburg	1 receptions, 35 yards, TD
Monmouth	Passing	Derek Robertson	11/14, 180 yards, TD
Monmouth	Rushing	Sone Ntoh	15 carries, 136 yards, 5 TD
Monmouth	Receiving	Gavin Nelson	3 receptions, 62 yards

=== Delaware ===
Game Six – Delaware Fightin' Blue Hens (4–0) at Monmouth Hawks (3–2) – Game summary

Quarter	1	2	3	4	Total
Fightin' Blue Hens	3	11	14	14	42
Hawks	7	7	7	14	35

at Kessler Field • West Long Branch, NJ

- Date: Saturday October 5, 2024
- Game time: 1:00 PM EST
- Game weather: Sunny, 74 °F (23 °C), Wind: SE @ 11 mph
- Game attendance: 3,374
- Referee: Anthony Florio
- TV announcers (FloSports): Eddy Occhipinti (play-by-play) and Emory Hunt (analyst)

Game information

First quarter

- (11:50) DEL – Nate Reed 23-yard field goal (Drive: 7 plays, 57 yards, 1:47; Delaware 3-0)
- (06:20) MONM – Tra Neal 6-yard pass from Derek Robertson (Michael Calton Jr. kick) (Drive: 13 plays, 75 yards, 5:30; Monmouth 7-3)

Second quarter

- (12:45) DEL – Nate Reed 24-yard field goal (Drive: 7 plays, 55 yards, 2:20; Monmouth 7-6)
- (05:05) DEL – Marcus Yarns 1-yard run (Zach Marker pass to Marcus Yarns for two-point conversion) (Drive: 14 plays, 71 yards, 6:47; Delaware 14-7)
- (04:45) MONM – TJ Speight 87-yard pass from Derek Robertson (Michael Calton Jr. kick) (Drive: 1 play, 87 yards, 0:14; 14-14)

Third quarter

- (08:18) DEL – Zach Marker 5-yard run (Nate Reed kick) (Drive: 15 plays, 69 yards, 6:36; Delaware 21-14)
- (08:02) MONM – Gavin Nelson 72-yard pass from Derek Robertson (Michael Calton Jr. kick) (Drive: 1 play, 72 yards, 0:09; 21-21')
- (04:31) DEL – Phil Lutz 2-yard pass from Zach Marker (Nate Reed kick) (Drive: 9 plays, 63 yards, 3:27; Delaware 28-21)

Fourth quarter

- (13:57) MONM – Jack Neri 7-yard pass from Derek Robertson (Michael Calton Jr. PAT blocked) (Drive: 11 plays, 75 yards, 5:34; Delaware 28-27)
- (10:48) DEL – Phil Lutz 29-yard pass from Zach Marker (Nate Reed kick) (Drive: 7 plays, 81 yards, 3:01; Delaware 35-27)
- (06:10) DEL – Marcus Yarns 86-yard pass from Zach Marker (Nate Reed kick) (Drive: 2 plays, 92 yards, 0:55; Delaware 42-27)
- (03:20) MONM – Sone Ntoh 1-yard run (Derek Robertson pass to Gavin Nelson for two-point conversion) (Drive: 8 plays, 60 yards, 2:50; Delaware 42-35)

Statistics	DEL	MONM
First downs	26	18
Total yards	607	473
Rushing yards	309	112
Passing yards	298	361
Passing: Comp–Att–Int	16-33-0	19-35-1
Time of possession	34:28	25:32

Team	Category	Player	Statistics
Delaware	Passing	Zach Marker	16/33, 298 yards, 3 TD
Delaware	Rushing	Marcus Yarns	22 carries, 142 yards, TD
Delaware	Receiving	Phil Lutz	6 receptions, 91 yards, 2 TD
Monmouth	Passing	Derek Robertson	19/35, 361 yards, 4 TD, INT
Monmouth	Rushing	Rodney Nelson	14 carries, 76 yards
Monmouth	Receiving	TJ Speight	6 receptions, 133 yards, TD

=== Bryant ===
Game Seven – Bryant Bulldogs (2–4) at Monmouth Hawks (3–3) – Game summary

Quarter	1	2	3	4	Total
Bulldogs	7	3	0	7	17
Hawks	21	6	14	14	55

at Kessler Field • West Long Branch, NJ

- Date: Saturday October 19, 2024
- Game time: 1:00 PM EST
- Game weather: Sunny, 66 °F (19 °C)
- Game attendance: 2,852
- Referee: Cory Hanson
- TV announcers (FloSports): Eddy Occhipinti (play-by-play) and Emory Hunt (analyst)

Game information

First quarter

- (10:08) MONM – Sone Ntoh 5-yard run (Michael Calton Jr. kick) (Drive: 11 plays, 86 yards, 4:45; Monmouth 7-0)
- (08:22) MONM – TJ Speight 64-yard run (Michael Calton Jr. kick) (Drive: 1 play, 64 yards, 0:12; Monmouth 14-0)
- (04:30) MONM – Sone Ntoh 1-yard run (Michael Calton Jr. kick) (Drive: 6 plays, 57 yards, 2:17; Monmouth 21-0)
- (04:18) BRY - Keylijah Williams 86-yard kickoff return (Bryce Soli kick) (Monmouth 21-7)

Second quarter

- (06:26) MONM – Tra Neal 16-yard pass from Derek Robertson (Michael Calton Jr. PAT failed) (Drive: 5 plays, 74 yards, 1:58; Monmouth 27-7)
- (00:00) BRY - Bryce Soli 41-yard field goal (Drive: 10 plays, 27 yards, 1:25; Monmouth 27-10)

Third quarter

- (08:11) MONM – Sone Ntoh 5-yard run (Michael Calton Jr. kick) (Drive: 14 plays, 93 yards, 5:06; Monmouth 34-10)
- (01:08) MONM – TJ Speight 7-yard pass from Derek Robertson (Michael Calton Jr. kick) (Drive: 8 plays, 51 yards, 3:39; Monmouth 41-10)

Fourth quarter

- (13:48) MONM – Sone Ntoh 2-yard run (Michael Calton Jr. kick) (Drive: 3 plays, 36 yards, 1:12; Monmouth 48-10)
- (07:54) MONM – TJ Speight 10-yard pass from Frankie Savino (Michael Calton Jr. kick) (Drive: 5 plays, 34 yards, 2:47; Monmouth 55-10)
- (05:29) BRY – Drew Montez 6-yard pass from Brennan Myer (Bryce Soli kick) (Drive: 7 plays, 25 yards, 2:13; Monmouth 55-17)

Statistics	BRY	MONM
First downs	16	34
Total yards	303	584
Rushing yards	103	328
Passing yards	200	256
Passing: Comp–Att–Int	20–38–2	24–31–0
Time of possession	27:46	32:14

Team	Category	Player	Statistics
Bryant	Passing	Brennan Myer	7/12, 105 yards, TD, 2 INT
Bryant	Rushing	Fabrice Mukendi	10 carries, 77 yards
Bryant	Receiving	Landon Ruggieri	5 receptions, 95 yards
Monmouth	Passing	Derek Robertson	22/29, 237 yards, 2 TD
Monmouth	Rushing	Rodney Nelson	16 carries, 101 yards
Monmouth	Receiving	Josh Derry	7 receptions, 83 yards

=== Towson ===
Game Eight – Towson Tigers (3–4) at Monmouth Hawks (4–3) – Game summary

Quarter	1	2	3	4	Total
Tigers	0	10	10	6	26
Hawks	0	7	7	0	14

at Kessler Field • West Long Branch, NJ

- Date: Saturday October 26, 2024
- Game time: 1:00 PM EST
- Game weather: Sunny, 66 °F (19 °C) Wind: SE @ 12 mph
- Game attendance: 2,372
- Referee: Tom Zetts
- TV announcers (FloSports): Eddy Occhipinti (play-by-play) and Emory Hunt (analyst)

Game information

First quarter

No scoring plays

Second quarter

- (13:20) TOW – Tyrell Greene Jr. 10-yard run (Keegan Vaughan kick) (Drive: 7 plays, 40 yards, 3:03; Towson 7-0)
- (8:54) MONM – Sone Ntoh 1-yard run (Michael Calton Jr. kick) (Drive: 9 plays, 69 yards, 4:20; 7-7)
- (1:40) TOW – Keegan Vaughan 23-yard field goal (Drive: 9 plays, 30 yards, 3:18; Towson 10-7)

Third quarter

- (10:50) TOW – Carter Runyon 3-yard pass from Sean Brown (Keegan Vaughan kick) (Drive: 9 plays, 70 yards, 4:10; Towson 17-7)
- (03:56) MONM – Gavin Nelson 33-yard pass from Derek Robertson (Michael Calton Jr. kick) (Drive: 13 plays, 86 yards, 6:48; Monmouth 17-14)
- (0:07) TOW – Keegan Vaughan 22-yard field goal (Drive: 8 plays, 63 yards, 3:44; Towson 20-14)

Fourth quarter

- (08:35) TOW – Carter Runyon 6-yard pass from Sean Brown (Two-point pass conversion failed) (Drive: 10 plays, 54 yards, 4:02; Towson 26-14)

Statistics	TOW	MONM
First downs	22	21
Total yards	357	361
Rushing yards	114	56
Passing yards	243	305
Passing: Comp–Att–Int	27-36-0	28-46-1
Time of possession	30:48	29:12

Team	Category	Player	Statistics
Towson	Passing	Sean Brown	27/36, 243 yards, 2 TD
Towson	Rushing	Devin Matthews	15 carries, 75 yards
Towson	Receiving	Jaceon Doss	8 receptions, 65 yards
Monmouth	Passing	Derek Robertson	28/46, 305 yards, TD, INT
Monmouth	Rushing	Rodney Nelson	9 carries, 37 yards
Monmouth	Receiving	Gavin Nelson	9 receptions, 133 yards, TD

=== at No. 14 Rhode Island ===
Game Nine – Monmouth Hawks (4–4) at No. 14 Rhode Island Rams (7–1) – Game summary

Quarter	1	2	3	4	Total
Hawks	14	7	7	0	28
No. 14 Rams	7	10	7	13	37

at Meade Stadium • Kingston, RI

- Date: Saturday November 2, 2024
- Game time: 1:00 PM EST
- Game weather: Sunny, 60 °F (16 °C)
- Game attendance: 5,674
- Referee: Bill McKeever
- TV announcers (FloSports): Stone Freeman (play-by-play) and Montaner Fresilli (analyst)

Game information

First quarter

- (8:46) MONM – Sone Ntoh 7-yard run (Michael Calton Jr. kick) (Drive: 9 plays, 35 yards, 3:39; Monmouth 7–0)
- (4:25) URI – Marquis Buchanan 28-yard pass from Devin Farrell (Ty Groff kick) (Drive: 8 plays, 88 yards, 4:15; Tied 7–7)
- (0:33) MONM – Jack Neri 4-yard pass from Derek Robertson (Michael Calton Jr. kick) (Drive: 11 plays, 67 yards, 3:45; Monmouth 14–7)

Second quarter

- (8:27) URI – Ty Groff 29-yard field goal (Drive: 14 plays, 57 yards, 7:00; Monmouth 14–10)
- (3:09) MONM – Sone Ntoh 2-yard run (Michael Calton Jr. kick) (Drive: 12 plays, 84 yards, 5:13; Monmouth 21–10)
- (1:54) URI – Tommy Smith 29-yard pass from Devin Farrell (Ty Groff kick) (Drive: 4 plays, 62 yards, 1:07; Monmouth 21–17)

Third quarter

- (11:40) MONM – Tra Neal 11-yard pass from Derek Robertson (Michael Calton Jr. kick) (Drive: 3 plays, 25 yards, 0:53; Monmouth 28–17)
- (1:44) URI – Malik Grant 16-yard run (Ty Groff kick) (Drive: 4 plays, 65 yards, 1:15; Monmouth 28–24)

Fourth quarter

- (1:17) URI – Marquis Buchanan 24-yard pass from Devin Farrell (Ty Groff kick) (Drive: 8 plays, 69 yards, 1:52; Rhode Island 31–28)
- (0:00) URI – Frederick Mallay 7-yard fumble return (Drive: 2 plays, -2 yards, 0:14; Rhode Island 37–28)

Statistics	MONM	URI
First downs	24	29
Total yards	335	476
Rushing yards	69	211
Passing yards	266	265
Passing: Comp–Att–Int	28-43-0	20-25-2
Time of possession	28:38	31:22

Team	Category	Player	Statistics
Monmouth	Passing	Derek Robertson	28/43, 266 yards, 2 TD
Monmouth	Rushing	Rodney Nelson	13 carries, 46 yards
Monmouth	Receiving	Josh Derry	6 receptions, 100 yards
Rhode Island	Passing	Devin Farrell	20/25, 265 yards, 3 TD, 2 INT
Rhode Island	Rushing	Malik Grant	25 carries, 126 yards, TD
Rhode Island	Receiving	Marquis Buchanan	12 receptions, 171 yards, 2 TD

=== at New Hampshire ===
Game Ten – Monmouth Hawks (4–5) at New Hampshire Wildcats (5–4) – Game summary

Quarter	1	2	3	4	Total
Hawks	0	14	0	6	20
Wildcats	7	13	10	3	33

at Wildcat Stadium • Durham, NH

- Date: Saturday November 9, 2024
- Game time: 1:00 PM EST
- Game weather: Sunny, 48 °F (9 °C)
- Game attendance: 5,108
- Referee: Henry Wimberg
- TV announcers (FloSports): Joe Well (play-by-play) and Evan Gray (analyst)

Game information

First quarter

- (08:57) UNH – Colby Ramshaw 5-yard pass from Seth Morgan (Nick Mazzie kick) (Drive: 10 plays, 57 yards, 4:44; New Hampshire 7-0)

Second quarter

- (14:32) MONM – TJ Speight 36-yard pass from Derek Robertson (Michael Calton Jr. kick) (Drive: 6 plays, 69 yards, 2:19; 7-7)
- (13:21) UNH – Logan Tomlinson 5-yard pass from Seth Morgan (Nick Mazzie kick) (Drive: 2 plays, 5 yards, 0:07; New Hampshire 14-7)
- (10:13) MONM – Sone Ntoh 19-yard run (Michael Calton Jr. kick) (Drive: 4 plays, 28 yards, 1:40; 14-14)
- (05:25) UNH – Nick Mazzie 42-yard field goal (Drive: 10 plays, 45 yards, 4:45; New Hampshire 17-14)
- (00:20) UNH – Nick Mazzie 35-yard field goal (Drive: 12 plays, 52 yards, 1:33; New Hampshire 20-14)

Third quarter

- (07:07) UNH – Nick Mazzie 35-yard field goal (Drive: 13 plays, 57 yards, 7:49; New Hampshire 23-14)
- (00:14) UNH – Denzell Gibson 11-yard run (Nick Mazzie kick) (Drive: 5 plays, 27 yards, 2:42; New Hampshire 30-14)

Fourth quarter

- (12:12) MONM – Tra Neal 8-yard pass from Derek Robertson (Two-point pass conversion failed) (Drive: 12 plays, 70 yards, 2:56; Monmouth 30-20)
- (05:02) UNH – Nick Mazzie 31-yard field goal (Drive: 15 plays, 39 yards, 7:10; New Hampshire 33-20)

Statistics	MONM	UNH
First downs	14	24
Total yards	313	335
Rushing yards	115	130
Passing yards	198	205
Passing: Comp–Att–Int	17-34-0	25-41-0
Time of possession	18:23	41:37

Team	Category	Player	Statistics
Monmouth	Passing	Derek Robertson	17/34, 198 yards, 2 TD
Monmouth	Rushing	Sone Ntoh	5 carries, 54 yards, TD
Monmouth	Receiving	TJ Speight	3 receptions, 60 yards, TD
New Hampshire	Passing	Seth Morgan	25/40, 205 yards, 2 TD
New Hampshire	Rushing	Denzell Gibson	16 receptions, 88 yards, TD
New Hampshire	Receiving	Logan Tomlinson	10 receptions, 115 yards, TD

=== No. 9 Villanova ===
Game Eleven – No. 9 Villanova Wildcats (8–2) at Monmouth Hawks (4–6) – Game summary

Quarter	1	2	3	4	Total
No. 9 Wildcats	7	7	3	16	33
Hawks	6	13	14	7	40

at Kessler Field • West Long Branch, NJ

- Date: Saturday November 16, 2024
- Game time: 12:00 PM EST
- Game weather: Sunny, 60 °F (16 °C), Wind: E @ 15 mph
- Game attendance: 2,856
- Referee: Henry Wimberg
- TV announcers (FloSports): Matt Harmon (play-by-play) and Emory Hunt (analyst)

Game information

First quarter

- (10:55) MON – Sone Ntoh 6-yard pass from Derek Robertson (Michael Calton Jr. PAT failed) (Drive: 7 plays, 75 yards, 4:05; Monmouth 6-0)
- (02:19) VIL – Connor Watkins 2-yard run (Ethan Gettman kick) (Drive: 14 plays, 73 yards, 8:36; Villanova 7–6)

Second quarter

- (13:52) MON – Josh Derry 32-yard pass from Derek Robertson (Two-point run conversion failed) (Drive: 7 plays, 75 yards, 3:27; Monmouth 12-7)
- (10:44) MON – Max James 19-yard pass from Derek Robertson (Michael Calton Jr. kick) (Drive: 5 plays, 52 yards, 1:18; Monmouth 19-7)
- (06:26) VIL – David Avit 25-yard run (Ethan Gettman kick) (Drive: 8 plays, 59 yards, 4:10; Monmouth 19-14)

Third quarter

- (10:21) MON – Rodney Nelson 26-yard run (Michael Calton Jr. kick) (Drive: 2 plays, 85 yards, 0:33; Monmouth 26-14)
- (06:50) VIL – Ethan Gettman 26-yard field goal (Drive: 7 plays, 35 yards, 3:22; Monmouth 26-17)
- (5:01) MON – Sone Ntoh 7-yard run (Michael Calton Jr. kick) (Drive: 4 plays, 67 yards, 1:40; Monmouth 33-17)

Fourth quarter

- (14:50) VIL – Connor Watkins 6-yard run (Connor Watkins run for two-point conversion) (Drive: 10 plays, 75 yards, 5:11; Monmouth 33-25)
- (9:31) MON – Sone Ntoh 1-yard run (Michael Calton Jr. kick) (Drive: 10 plays, 75 yards, 5:19; Monmouth 40-25)
- (6:03) VIL – Devin Smith 17-yard pass from Connor Watkins (Connor Watkins run for two-point conversion) (Drive: 12 plays, 79 yards, 3:25; Monmouth 40-33)

Statistics	VILL	MONM
First downs	21	18
Total yards	328	502
Rushing yards	93	144
Passing yards	235	358
Passing: Comp–Att–Int	20–32–0	22–23–0
Time of possession	32:49	27:11

Team	Category	Player	Statistics
Villanova	Passing	Connor Watkins	20/32, 235 yards, TD
Villanova	Rushing	David Avit	14 carries, 65 yards, TD
Villanova	Receiving	Chris Colby	4 receptions, 56 yards
Monmouth	Passing	Derek Robertson	22/23, 358 yards, 3 TD
Monmouth	Rushing	Rodney Nelson	10 carries, 83 yards, TD
Monmouth	Receiving	TJ Speight	7 receptions, 120 yards

=== at No. 18 Stony Brook ===
Game Twelve – Monmouth Hawks (5–6) at No. 18 Stony Brook Seawolves (8–3) – Game summary

Quarter	1	2	3	4	Total
Hawks	14	28	7	6	55
No. 18 Seawolves	13	17	14	3	47

at Kenneth P. LaValle Stadium • Stony Brook, NY

- Date: Saturday November 23, 2024
- Game time: 1:00 PM EST
- Game weather: Cloudy, 47 °F (8 °C)
- Game attendance: 5,263
- Referee: Jeremy DeAngulo
- TV announcers (FloSports): Jonny Wincott (play-by-play), Brandon London (analyst) and Matt Levine (sideline)

Game information

First quarter

- (11:46) MON – Marcus Middleton 3-yard pass from Derek Robertson, Michael Calton Jr. kick (Drive: 9 plays, 75 yards, 3:14; Monmouth 7–0)
- (8:25) SBU – Enda Kirby 27-yard field goal (Drive: 9 plays, 71 yards, 3:19; Monmouth 7–3)
- (7:29) SBU – Brandon Boria 4-yard punt return, Enda Kirby (Stony Brook 10–7)
- (6:10) MON – Tra Neal 51-yard pass from Derek Robertson, Michael Calton Jr. kick (Drive: 5 plays, 75 yards, 1:19; Monmouth 14–10)
- (2:53) SBU – Enda Kirby 25-yard field goal (Drive: 8 plays, 54 yards, 3:13; Monmouth 14–13)

Second quarter

- (14:57) MON – Stone Ntoh 5-yard run, Michael Calton Jr. kick (Drive: 10 plays, 75 yards, 2:56; Monmouth 21–13)
- (10:03) SBU – Roland Dempster 13-yard pass from Tyler Knoop, Enda Kirby kick (Drive: 9 plays, 75 yards, 4:54; Monmouth 21–20)
- (8:54) MON – Derek Robertson 42-yard pass from Derek Robertson, Michael Calton Jr. kick (Drive: 3 plays, 75 yards, 1:03; Monmouth 28–20)
- (5:46) MON – Rodney Nelson 13-yard run, Michael Calton Jr. kick (Drive: 5 plays, 60 yards, 1:32; Monmouth 35–20)
- (1:54) SBU – Cal Redman 21-yard pass from Tyler Knoop, Enda Kirby kick (Drive: 9 plays, 65 yards, 3:52; Monmouth 35–27)
- (0:58) MON – Stone Ntoh 1-yard run, Michael Calton Jr. kick (Drive: 6 plays, 75 yards, 0:51; Monmouth 42–27)
- (0:00) SBU – Enda Kirby 35-yard field goal (Drive: 8 plays, 58 yards, 0:58; Monmouth 42–30)

Third quarter

- (10:54) SBU – Dez Williams 17-yard pass from Tyler Knoop, Enda Kirby kick (Drive: 10 plays, 75 yards, 4:06; Monmouth 42–37)
- (8:20) MON – Rodney Nelson 8-yard run, Michael Calton Jr. kick (Drive: 5 plays, 75 yards, 2:28; Monmouth 49–37)
- (1:26) SBU – Dez Williams 23-yard pass from Tyler Knoop, Enda Kirby kick (Drive: 8 plays, 54 yards, 3:14; Monmouth 49–44)

Fourth quarter

- (3:07) MON – Jack Neri 40-yard pass from Tra Neal (Drive: 3 plays, 58 yards, 1:29; Monmouth 55–44)
- (1:42) SBU – Enda Kirby 34-yard field goal (Drive: 7 plays, 37 yards, 1:20; Monmouth 55–47)

Statistics	MONM	STBK
First downs	31	31
Total yards	690	559
Rushing yards	114	128
Passing yards	576	431
Passing: Comp–Att–Int	29–46–0	38–55–1
Time of possession	25:49	34:11

Team	Category	Player	Statistics
Monmouth	Passing	Derek Robertson	28/45, 536 yards, 3 TD
Monmouth	Rushing	Rodney Nelson	8 carries, 44 yards, 2 TD
Monmouth	Receiving	TJ Speight	7 receptions, 151 yards
Stony Brook	Passing	Tyler Knoop	37/53, 408 yards, 3 TD, INT
Stony Brook	Rushing	Roland Dempster	20 carries, 95 yards
Stony Brook	Receiving	Daz Williams	11 receptions, 134 yards, 2 TD
