= 2024 North Carolina A&T Aggies football team =

American college football season

2024 North Carolina A&T Aggies football
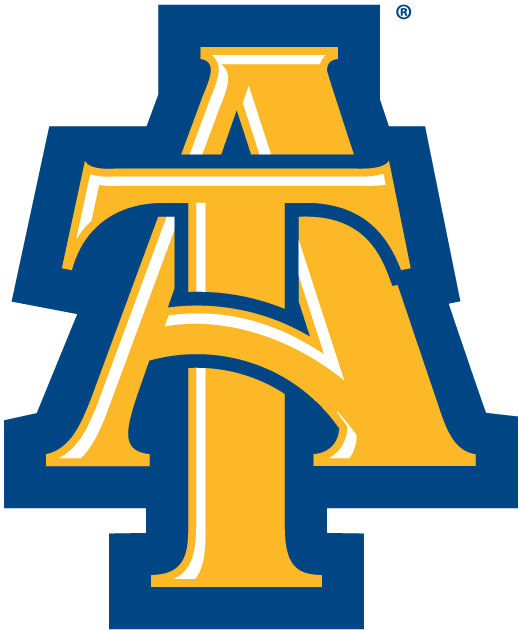
- Conference: CAA Football
- Record: 1–11 (0–8 CAA)
- Head coach: Vincent Brown (2nd season)
- Offensive coordinator: David Marsh (1st season)
- Defensive coordinator: Josh Zidenberg (2nd season)
- Home stadium: Truist Stadium

2024 Coastal Athletic Association Football Conference standings
	Conf.			Overall
Team	W		L	W		L
No. 15 Richmond +^	8	–	0	10	–	3
No. 9 Rhode Island* +^	7	–	1	11	–	3
No. 12 Villanova ^	6	–	2	10	–	4
Delaware*	6	–	2	9	–	2
No. 23 New Hampshire ^	6	–	2	8	–	5
Stony Brook	5	–	3	8	–	4
Towson	5	–	3	7	–	5
Elon	5	–	3	6	–	6
William & Mary	4	–	4	7	–	5
Monmouth	4	–	4	6	–	6
Maine	3	–	5	5	–	7
Albany	2	–	6	4	–	8
Hampton	2	–	6	5	–	7
Campbell	1	–	7	3	–	9
Bryant	0	–	8	2	–	10
North Carolina A&T	0	–	8	1	–	11
+ – Conference co-champions; ^ – FCS playoff participant; * Delaware ineligible for rankings and 2024 FCS playoffs due to transition to the FBS. Richmond and Rhode Island named co-champions as Rhode Island's only CAA loss was to Delaware.; Rankings from STATS Poll

The 2024 North Carolina A&T Aggies football team represented North Carolina A&T State University as a member of the Coastal Athletic Association Football Conference (CAA) during the 2024 NCAA Division I FCS football season. The Aggies were led by second-year head coach Vincent Brown and played home games at Truist Stadium in Greensboro, North Carolina.

== Schedule ==
Date	Time	Opponent	Site	TV	Result	Attendance
August 29	7:00 p.m.	at Wake Forest*	Allegacy Federal Credit Union Stadium; Winston-Salem, NC	ACCNX	L 13–45	29,450
September 7	7:00 p.m.	Winston–Salem State*	Truist Stadium; Greensboro, NC (rivalry)	FloSports	W 27–20	N/A
September 14	1:00 p.m.	Delaware	Truist Stadium; Greensboro, NC	FloSports	L 13–42	11,421
September 21	7:00 p.m.	at North Carolina Central*	O'Kelly–Riddick Stadium; Durham, NC (rivalry)	ESPNU	L 24–66	14,400
September 28	6:00 p.m.	at South Carolina State*	Oliver C. Dawson Stadium; Orangeburg, SC (rivalry)	ESPN+	L 25–45	15,126
October 5	2:00 p.m.	at Richmond	E. Claiborne Robins Stadium; Richmond, VA	FloSports	L 17–20	6,246
October 19	1:00 p.m.	Hampton^{†}	Truist Stadium; Greensboro, NC	FloSports	L 17–59	23,016
October 26	4:00 p.m.	at Campbell	Barker–Lane Stadium; Buies Creek, NC	FloSports	L 7–21	5,591
November 2	1:00 p.m.	No. 24 William & Mary	Truist Stadium; Greensboro, NC	FloSports	L 7–45	7,355
November 9	1:00 p.m.	at No. 12 Villanova	Villanova Stadium; Villanova, PA	FloSports	L 3–31	4,009
November 16	1:00 p.m.	at Towson	Johnny Unitas Stadium; Towson, MD	FloSports	L 13–31	3,960
November 23	1:00 p.m.	Elon	Truist Stadium; Greensboro, NC	FloSports	L 21–31	3,033
*Non-conference game; ^{†}Homecoming; Rankings from STATS Poll released prior to the game; All times are in Eastern time

== Game summaries ==
=== at Wake Forest (FBS) ===
Game One – North Carolina A&T Aggies (0-0) at Wake Forest Demon Deacons (FBS) (0-0) – Game summary

Quarter	1	2	3	4	Total
Aggies	7	3	0	3	13
Demon Deacons (FBS)	7	10	21	7	45

at Allegacy Federal Credit Union Stadium, Winston-Salem, NC

- Date: Thursday August 29, 2024
- Game time: 7:00 PM
- Game attendance: 29,450
- Referee: Stuart Mullins
- TV announcers (ACCNX): Matt Schick (play-by-play) and Charles Arbuckle (analyst)

Game information

First quarter

- (11:25) WAKE – Demond Claiborne 7-yard run (Matthew Dennis kick) (Drive: 5 plays, 55 yards, 1:29; Wake Forest 7-0)
- (2:29) NCAT – Kenji Christian 21-yard run (Andrew Brown kick) (Drive: 11 plays, 80 yards, 5:17; Tied 7-7)

Second quarter

- (6:49) NCAT – Andrew Brown 38-yard field goal (Drive: 15 plays, 71 yards, 8:32; North Carolina A&T 10-7)
- (5:00) WAKE – Donavon Greene 24-yard pass from Hank Bachmeier (Matthew Dennis kick) (Drive: 5 plays, 75 yards, 1:49; Wake Forest 14-10)
- (0:02) WAKE – Matthew Dennis 31-yard field goal (Drive: 14 plays, 72 yards, 2:46; Wake Forest 17-10)

Third quarter

- (12:54) WAKE – Taylor Morin 73-yard punt return (Matthew Dennis kick) (Wake Forest 24-10)
- (6:15) WAKE – Horatio Fields 5-yard pass from Hank Bachmeier (Matthew Dennis kick) (Drive: 7 plays, 88 yards, 2:39; Wake Forest 31-10)
- (0:13) WAKE – Deuce Alexander 4-yard pass from Hank Bachmeier (Matthew Dennis kick) (Drive: 9 plays, 90 yards, 2:35; Wake Forest 38-10)

Fourth quarter

- (11:05) NCAT – Andrew Brown 51-yard field goal (Drive: 8 plays, 42 yards, 4:08; Wake Forest 38-13)
- (5:37) WAKE – Tate Carney 2-yard run (Matthew Dennis kick) (Drive: 12 plays, 62 yards, 5:22; Wake Forest 45-13)

Statistics	NCAT	WAKE
First downs	22	26
Total yards	69–337	68–513
Rushing yards	44–185	32–193
Passing yards	152	320
Passing: Comp–Att–Int	15–25–0	23–36–0
Time of possession	36:21	23:39

Team	Category	Player	Statistics
North Carolina A&T	Passing	Kevin White	10/15, 116 yards
North Carolina A&T	Rushing	Kenji Christian	16 carries, 121 yards, TD
North Carolina A&T	Receiving	Ger-Cari Caldwell	5 receptions, 51 yards
Wake Forest	Passing	Hank Bachmeier	18/28, 263 yards, 3 TD
Wake Forest	Rushing	Demond Claiborne	17 carries, 135 yards, TD
Wake Forest	Receiving	Taylor Morin	6 receptions, 100 yards

=== vs. Winston Salem-State (DII) (rivalry) ===
Game Two – Winston-Salem State Rams (DII) (1–0) at North Carolina A&T Aggies (0–1) – Game summary

Quarter	1	2	3	4	Total
Rams (DII)	0	0	0	0	0
Aggies	0	0	0	0	0

at Truist Stadium • Greensboro, NC

- Date: Saturday, September 7, 2024
- Game time: 7:00 p.m.
- TV: FloSports

Game information

First quarter
Second quarter
Third quarter
Fourth quarter

Statistics	WNSL	NCAT
First downs		
Total yards		
Rushing yards		
Passing yards		
Passing: Comp–Att–Int		
Time of possession		

Team	Category	Player	Statistics
Winston-Salem State	Passing		
Winston-Salem State	Rushing		
Winston-Salem State	Receiving		
North Carolina A&T	Passing		
North Carolina A&T	Rushing		
North Carolina A&T	Receiving		

=== vs. Delaware ===
Game Three – Delaware Fightin' Blue Hens (1–0) at North Carolina A&T Aggies (1–1) – Game summary

Quarter	1	2	3	4	Total
Fightin' Blue Hens	0	0	0	0	0
Aggies	0	0	0	0	0

at Truist Stadium • Greensboro, NC

- Date: Saturday, September 14, 2024
- Game time: 1:00 p.m.
- TV: FloSports

Game information

First quarter
Second quarter
Third quarter
Fourth quarter

Statistics	DEL	NCAT
First downs		
Total yards		
Rushing yards		
Passing yards		
Passing: Comp–Att–Int		
Time of possession		

Team	Category	Player	Statistics
Delaware	Passing		
Delaware	Rushing		
Delaware	Receiving		
North Carolina A&T	Passing		
North Carolina A&T	Rushing		
North Carolina A&T	Receiving		

=== at North Carolina Central (rivalry) ===
Game Four – North Carolina A&T Aggies (1–2) at North Carolina Central Eagles (1–2) – Game summary

Quarter	1	2	3	4	Total
Aggies	0	0	0	0	0
Eagles	0	0	0	0	0

at O'Kelly–Riddick Stadium • Durham, NC

- Date: Saturday, September 21, 2024
- Game time: 7:00 p.m.
- TV announcers (ESPNU): Tiffany Greene (play-by-play) and Jay Walker (analyst)

Game information

First quarter
Second quarter
Third quarter
Fourth quarter

Statistics	NCAT	NCCU
First downs		
Total yards		
Rushing yards		
Passing yards		
Passing: Comp–Att–Int		
Time of possession		

Team	Category	Player	Statistics
North Carolina A&T	Passing		
North Carolina A&T	Rushing		
North Carolina A&T	Receiving		
North Carolina Central	Passing		
North Carolina Central	Rushing		
North Carolina Central	Receiving		

=== at South Carolina State (rivalry) ===
Game Five – North Carolina A&T Aggies (1–3) at South Carolina State Bulldogs (1–2) – Game summary

Quarter	1	2	3	4	Total
Aggies	0	0	0	0	0
Bulldogs	0	0	0	0	0

at Oliver C. Dawson Stadium • Orangeburg, SC

- Date: Saturday, September 28, 2024
- Game time: 6:00 p.m.
- TV: ESPN+

Game information

First quarter
Second quarter
Third quarter
Fourth quarter

Statistics	NCAT	SCST
First downs		
Total yards		
Rushing yards		
Passing yards		
Passing: Comp–Att–Int		
Time of possession		

Team	Category	Player	Statistics
North Carolina A&T	Passing		
North Carolina A&T	Rushing		
North Carolina A&T	Receiving		
South Carolina State	Passing		
South Carolina State	Rushing		
South Carolina State	Receiving		

=== at Richmond ===
Game Six – North Carolina A&T Aggies (1–4) at Richmond Spiders (3–2) – Game summary

Quarter	1	2	3	4	Total
Aggies	3	7	0	7	17
Spiders	0	10	10	0	20

at E. Claiborne Robins Stadium • Richmond, VA

- Date: Saturday, October 5, 2024
- Game time: 2:00 p.m.
- Game weather: Sunny
- Game attendance: 6,246
- TV: FloSports

Game information

First quarter
Second quarter
Third quarter
Fourth quarter

Statistics	NCAT	RICH
First downs	14	18
Total yards	349	410
Rushing yards	88	286
Passing yards	261	124
Passing: Comp–Att–Int	22–27–0	10–18–0
Time of possession	32:40	27:20

Team	Category	Player	Statistics
North Carolina A&T	Passing	Justin Fomby	22–27, 261 yards, 2 TD
North Carolina A&T	Rushing	Cameren Dalrymple	15 carries, 45 yards
North Carolina A&T	Receiving	Ger-Cari Caldwell	7 receptions, 130 yards
Richmond	Passing	Camden Coleman	10–18, 124 yards
Richmond	Rushing	Zach Palmer-Smith	25 carries, 200 yards, TD
Richmond	Receiving	Matt Robbert	3 receptions, 49 yards

=== Hampton ===
Game Seven – Hampton Pirates (3–3) vs North Carolina A&T Aggies (1–5) – Game summary

Quarter	1	2	3	4	Total
Pirates	0	0	0	0	0
Aggies	0	0	0	0	0

at Truist Stadium, Greensboro, NC

- Date: Saturday October 19, 2024
- Game time: 1:00 PM
- TV: FloSports

Game information

First quarter
Second quarter
Third quarter
Fourth quarter

Statistics	HAMP	NCAT
First downs		
Total yards		
Rushing yards		
Passing yards		
Passing: Comp–Att–Int		
Time of possession		

Team	Category	Player	Statistics
Hampton	Passing		
Hampton	Rushing		
Hampton	Receiving		
North Carolina A&T	Passing		
North Carolina A&T	Rushing		
North Carolina A&T	Receiving		

=== at Campbell ===
Game Eight – North Carolina A&T Aggies (1–7) at Campbell Fighting Camels (2–6) – Game summary

Quarter	1	2	3	4	Total
Aggies	0	0	0	0	0
Fighting Camels	0	0	0	0	0

at Barker–Lane Stadium • Buies Creek, NC

- Date: Saturday, October 26, 2024
- Game time: 4:00 p.m.
- TV: FloSports

Game information

First quarter
Second quarter
Third quarter
Fourth quarter

Statistics	NCAT	CAM
First downs		
Total yards		
Rushing yards		
Passing yards		
Passing: Comp–Att–Int		
Time of possession		

Team	Category	Player	Statistics
North Carolina A&T	Passing		
North Carolina A&T	Rushing		
North Carolina A&T	Receiving		
Campbell	Passing		
Campbell	Rushing		
Campbell	Receiving		

=== No. 24 William & Mary ===
Game Nine – No. 24 William & Mary Tribe (5–3) vs North Carolina A&T Aggies (1–7) – Game summary

Quarter	1	2	3	4	Total
No. 24 Tribe	21	7	7	10	45
Aggies	0	0	7	0	7

at Truist Stadium, Greensboro, NC

- Date: Saturday November 2, 2024
- Game time: 1:00 PM
- TV: FloSports

Game information

First quarter
Second quarter
Third quarter
Fourth quarter

Statistics	W&M	NCAT
First downs		
Total yards		
Rushing yards		
Passing yards		
Passing: Comp–Att–Int		
Time of possession		

Team	Category	Player	Statistics
William & Mary	Passing		
William & Mary	Rushing		
William & Mary	Receiving		
North Carolina A&T	Passing		
North Carolina A&T	Rushing		
North Carolina A&T	Receiving		

=== at No. 12 Villanova ===
Game Ten – North Carolina A&T Aggies (1–8) at No. 12 Villanova Wildcats (7–2) – Game summary

Quarter	1	2	3	4	Total
Aggies	0	0	0	0	0
No. 12 Wildcats	0	0	0	0	0

at Villanova Stadium, Villanova, PA

- Date: Saturday November 9, 2024
- Game time: 1:00 p.m.
- TV announcers (FloSports): TBD

Game information

First quarter
Second quarter
Third quarter
Fourth quarter

Statistics	NCAT	VILL
First downs		
Total yards		
Rushing yards		
Passing yards		
Passing: Comp–Att–Int		
Time of possession		

Team	Category	Player	Statistics
North Carolina A&T	Passing		
North Carolina A&T	Rushing		
North Carolina A&T	Receiving		
Villanova	Passing		
Villanova	Rushing		
Villanova	Receiving		

=== at Towson ===
Game Eleven – North Carolina A&T Aggies (0–0) vs Towson Tigers (0–0) – Game summary

Quarter	1	2	3	4	Total
Aggies	0	0	0	0	0
Tigers	0	0	0	0	0

at Johnny Unitas Stadium, Towson, MD

- Date: Saturday November 16, 2024
- Game time: 1:00 PM
- TV: FloSports

Game information

First quarter
Second quarter
Third quarter
Fourth quarter

Statistics	NCAT	TOW
First downs		
Total yards		
Rushing yards		
Passing yards		
Passing: Comp–Att–Int		
Time of possession		

Team	Category	Player	Statistics
North Carolina A&T	Passing		
North Carolina A&T	Rushing		
North Carolina A&T	Receiving		
Towson	Passing		
Towson	Rushing		
Towson	Receiving		

=== Elon ===
Game Twelve – Elon Phoenix (0–0) vs North Carolina A&T Aggies (0–0) – Game summary

Quarter	1	2	3	4	Total
Phoenix	0	0	0	0	0
Aggies	0	0	0	0	0

at Truist Stadium, Greensboro, NC

- Date: Saturday November 23, 2024
- Game time: 1:00 PM
- TV: FloSports

Game information

First quarter
Second quarter
Third quarter
Fourth quarter

Statistics	ELON	NCAT
First downs		
Total yards		
Rushing yards		
Passing yards		
Passing: Comp–Att–Int		
Time of possession		

Team	Category	Player	Statistics
Elon	Passing		
Elon	Rushing		
Elon	Receiving		
North Carolina A&T	Passing		
North Carolina A&T	Rushing		
North Carolina A&T	Receiving		
