= 2024 William & Mary Tribe football team =

American college football season

2024 William & Mary Tribe football
- Conference: CAA Football Conference
- Record: 7–5 (4–4 CAA)
- Head coach: Mike London (6th season)
- Offensive coordinator: Mario Acitelli (1st season)
- Co-defensive coordinators: Ras-I Dowling (2nd season); Bo Revell (2nd season)
- Home stadium: Zable Stadium

2024 Coastal Athletic Association Football Conference standings
	Conf.			Overall
Team	W		L	W		L
No. 15 Richmond +^	8	–	0	10	–	3
No. 9 Rhode Island* +^	7	–	1	11	–	3
No. 12 Villanova ^	6	–	2	10	–	4
Delaware*	6	–	2	9	–	2
No. 23 New Hampshire ^	6	–	2	8	–	5
Stony Brook	5	–	3	8	–	4
Towson	5	–	3	7	–	5
Elon	5	–	3	6	–	6
William & Mary	4	–	4	7	–	5
Monmouth	4	–	4	6	–	6
Maine	3	–	5	5	–	7
Albany	2	–	6	4	–	8
Hampton	2	–	6	5	–	7
Campbell	1	–	7	3	–	9
Bryant	0	–	8	2	–	10
North Carolina A&T	0	–	8	1	–	11
+ – Conference co-champions; ^ – FCS playoff participant; * Delaware ineligible for rankings and 2024 FCS playoffs due to transition to the FBS. Richmond and Rhode Island named co-champions as Rhode Island's only CAA loss was to Delaware.; Rankings from STATS Poll

The 2024 William & Mary Tribe football team represented the College of William & Mary as a member of the Coastal Athletic Association Football Conference (CAA) during the 2024 NCAA Division I FCS football season. The Tribe, were led by sixth-year head coach Mike London, and played their home games at Zable Stadium.

== Schedule ==
Date	Time	Opponent	Rank	Site	TV	Result	Attendance
August 29	7:00 p.m.	VMI*	No. 15	Zable Stadium; Williamsburg, VA (rivalry)	FloSports	W 41–7	8,096
September 7	7:00 p.m.	at Coastal Carolina*	No. 13	Brooks Stadium; Conway, SC	ESPN+	L 21–40	19,294
September 14	6:00 p.m.	at Wofford*	No. 13	Gibbs Stadium; Spartanburg, SC	ESPN+	W 28–21	4,039
September 21	6:00 p.m.	Furman*	No. 12	Zable Stadium; Williamsburg, VA	FloSports	W 34–24	7,657
September 28	6:00 p.m.	Hampton	No. 11	Zable Stadium; Williamsburg, VA	FloSports	W 49–7	11,317
October 5	6:00 p.m.	at Towson	No. 12	Johnny Unitas Stadium; Towson, MD	FloSports	L 27–34	6,165
October 19	3:30 p.m.	Campbell^{†}	No. 15	Zable Stadium; Williamsburg, VA	FloSports	W 35–28	12,138
October 26	3:30 p.m.	at Stony Brook	No. 16	Kenneth P. LaValle Stadium; Stony Brook, NY	FloSports	L 13–35	7,599
November 2	1:00 p.m.	at North Carolina A&T	No. 24	Truist Stadium; Greensboro, NC	FloSports	W 45–7	7,355
November 9	1:00 p.m.	Elon	No. 20	Zable Stadium; Williamsburg, VA	FloSports	L 36–40	8,131
November 16	1:00 p.m.	Bryant		Zable Stadium; Williamsburg, VA	FloSports	W 22–12	7,186
November 23	12:00 p.m.	at No. 10 Richmond		E. Claiborne Robins Stadium; Richmond, VA (Capital Cup)	FloSports	L 0–27	7,526
*Non-conference game; ^{†}Homecoming; Rankings from STATS Poll released prior to the game; All times are in Eastern time

== Game summaries ==
=== vs. VMI (rivalry) ===
Game One – VMI Keydets (0–0) at No. 15 William & Mary Tribe (0–0) – Game summary

Quarter	1	2	3	4	Total
Keydets	0	7	0	0	7
No. 15 Tribe	14	14	13	0	41

at Zable Stadium • Williamsburg, VA

- Date: Thursday August 29, 2024
- Game time: 7:00 p.m.
- Game weather: Sunny, 86 °F (30 °C)
- Game attendance: 8,096
- Referee: Todd Bowman
- TV announcers (FloSports): TBD

Game information

First quarter

- (10:00) W&M – Bronson Yoder 1-yard run, Eric Bernstein kick (Drive: 11 plays, 69 yards, 5:00; William & Mary 7–0)
- (3:00) W&M – Malachi Imoh 1-yard run, Eric Bernstein kick (Drive: 6 plays, 66 yards, 2:46; William & Mary 14–0)

Second quarter

- (7:25) W&M – Clayton Dobler 18-yard punt return, Eric Bernstein kick (William & Mary 21–0)
- (2:16) VMI – Hunter Rice 12-yard run, Caden Beck kick (Drive: 9 plays, 75 yards, 5:09; William & Mary 21–7)
- (0:14) W&M – Hollis Mathis 4-yard run, Eric Bernstein kick (Drive: 7 plays, 73 yards, 2:02; William & Mary 28–7)

Third quarter

- (9:55) W&M – Hollis Mathis 26-yard pass from Darius Wilson, Eric Bernstein kick (Drive: 5 plays, 61 yards, 2:35; William & Mary 35–7)
- (2:59) W&M – Sean McElwain 1-yard pass from Darius Wilson (Drive: 9 plays, 61 yards, 5:20; William & Mary 41–7)

Fourth quarter

No scoring

Statistics	VMI	W&M
First downs	14	21
Total yards	241	446
Rushing yards	145	205
Passing yards	96	241
Passing: Comp–Att–Int	12–25–2	15–20–0
Time of possession	32:04	27:56

Team	Category	Player	Statistics
VMI	Passing	Collin Shannon	8/19, 62 yards, INT
VMI	Rushing	Hunter Rice	17 carries, 81 yards, TD
VMI	Receiving	Hunter Rice	1 reception, 29 yards
William & Mary	Passing	Darius Wilson	11/15, 190 yards, 2 TD
William & Mary	Rushing	Bronson Yoder	10 carries, 54 yards, TD
William & Mary	Receiving	Hollis Mathis	2 receptions, 71 yards, TD

=== at Coastal Carolina (FBS) ===
Game Two – No. 13 William & Mary Tribe (1–0) at Coastal Carolina Chanticleers (FBS) (1–0) – Game summary

Quarter	1	2	3	4	Total
No. 13 Tribe	0	7	7	7	21
Chanticleers (FBS)	14	13	10	3	40

at Brooks Stadium • Conway, SC

- Date: Saturday September 7, 2024
- Game time: 7:00 p.m.
- Game weather: Sunny
- Game attendance: 19,294
- Referee: Steven Robinson
- TV announcers (ESPN+): Jeff McCarragher (play-by-play) and Nate Ross (analyst)

Game information

First quarter

- (12:02) CCU – Braydon Bennett 4-yard run, Kade Hensley kick (Drive: 5 plays, 57 yards, 1:31; Coastal Carolina 7–0)
- (3:11) CCU – Christian Washington 1-yard run, Kade Hensley kick (Drive: 9 plays, 99 yards, 4:28; Coastal Carolina 14–0)

Second quarter

- (12:52) CCU – Christian Washington 4-yard run, Kade Hensley kick (Drive: 9 plays, 81 yards, 3:18; Coastal Carolina 21–0)
- (11:30) W&M – DreSean Kendrick 62-yard pass from Darius Wilson, Eric Bernstein kick (Drive: 4 plays, 75 yards, 1:22; Coastal Carolina 21–7)
- (10:21) CCU – Kade Hensley 43-yard field goal (Drive: 5 plays, 48 yards, 1:09; Coastal Carolina 24–7)
- (0:00) CCU – Kade Hensley 33-yard field goal (Drive: 4 plays, 7 yards, 0:51; Coastal Carolina 27–7)

Third quarter

- (12:21) CCU – Kade Hensley 49-yard field goal (Drive: 9 plays, 38 yards, 2:32; Coastal Carolina 30–7)
- (11:37) CCU – Matthew McDoom 24-yard fumble recovery, Kade Hensley kick (Coastal Carolina 37–7)
- (6:12) W&M – Darius Wilson 19-yard run, Eric Bernstein kick (Drive: 4 plays, 30 yards, 2:01; Coastal Carolina 37–14)

Fourth quarter

- (4:17) CCU – Kade Hensley 49-yard field goal (Drive: 9 plays, 45 yards, 4:12; Coastal Carolina 40–14)
- (0:06) W&M – Tyler Hughes 4-yard run, Eric Bernstein kick (Drive: 15 plays, 75 yards, 4:11; Coastal Carolina 40–21)

Statistics	W&M	CCU
First downs	19	23
Total yards	319	456
Rushing yards	142	277
Passing yards	177	179
Passing: Comp–Att–Int	15–29–0	10–26–0
Time of possession	29:41	30:19

Team	Category	Player	Statistics
William & Mary	Passing	Darius Wilson	11/21, 165 yards, TD
William & Mary	Rushing	Tyler Hughes	54 yards, TD
William & Mary	Receiving	DreSean Kendrick	2 receptions, 74 yards, TD
Coastal Carolina	Passing	Ethan Vasko	8/23, 160 yards
Coastal Carolina	Rushing	Christian Washington	100 yards, 2 TD
Coastal Carolina	Receiving	Cameron Wright	3 receptions, 39 yards

=== at Wofford ===
Game Three – No. 13 William & Mary Tribe (1–1) at Wofford Terriers (2–0) – Game summary

Quarter	1	2	3	4	Total
No. 13 Tribe	7	7	7	7	28
Terriers	0	14	0	7	21

at Gibbs Stadium • Spartanburg, SC

- Date: Saturday September 14, 2024
- Game time: 6:00 p.m.
- Game weather: 0 °F (−18 °C)
- TV announcers (ESPN+): TBD

Game information

First quarter
Second quarter
Third quarter
Fourth quarter

=== vs. Furman ===
Game Four – Furman Paladins (1–2) vs No. 12 William & Mary Tribe (2–1) – Game summary

Quarter	1	2	3	4	Total
Paladins	14	0	7	3	24
No. 12 Tribe	7	13	7	7	34

at Zable Stadium, Williamsburg, VA

- Date: Saturday September 21, 2024
- Game time: 6:00 PM
- TV: FloSports

Game information

First quarter
Second quarter
Third quarter
Fourth quarter

=== vs. Hampton ===
Game Five – Hampton Pirates (3–1) vs No. 11 William & Mary Tribe (3–1) – Game summary

Quarter	1	2	3	4	Total
Pirates	7	0	0	0	7
No. 11 Tribe	7	14	7	21	49

at Zable Stadium, Williamsburg, VA

- Date: Saturday September 28, 2024
- Game time: 6:00 PM
- TV: FloSports

Game information

First quarter
Second quarter
Third quarter
Fourth quarter

=== at Towson ===
Game Six – No. 12 William & Mary Tribe (4–1) at Towson Tigers (1–3) – Game summary

Quarter	1	2	3	4	Total
No. 12 Tribe	0	13	0	14	27
Tigers	10	3	21	0	34

at Johnny Unitas Stadium, Towson, MD

- Date: Saturday October 5, 2024
- Game time: 6:00 p.m.
- TV: FloSports

Game information

First quarter
Second quarter
Third quarter
Fourth quarter

=== vs. Campbell ===
Game Seven – Campbell Fighting Camels (2–4) vs No. 15 William & Mary Tribe (4–2) – Game summary

Quarter	1	2	3	4	Total
Fighting Camels	7	7	7	7	28
No. 15 Tribe	14	7	0	14	35

at Zable Stadium, Williamsburg, VA

- Date: Saturday October 19, 2024
- Game time: 3:30 PM
- TV: FloSports

Game information

First quarter
Second quarter
Third quarter
Fourth quarter

=== at Stony Brook ===
Game Eight – No. 16 William & Mary Tribe (5–2) vs Stony Brook Seawolves (5–2) – Game summary

Quarter	1	2	3	4	Total
No. 16 Tribe	6	7	0	0	13
Seawolves	7	14	7	7	35

at Kenneth P. LaValle Stadium, Stony Brook, NY

- Date: Saturday October 26, 2024
- Game time: 3:30 PM
- Game weather: Sunny
- Game attendance: 7,599
- Referee: Todd Bowman
- TV announcers (FloSports): Jonny Wincott (play-by-play), Brandon London (analyst) and Matt Levine (sideline)

Game information

First quarter

- (12:54) SBU – Jayce Freeman 70-yard pass from Tyler Knoop, Enda Kirby kick (Drive: 1 play, 70 yards, 0:10; Stony Brook 7–0)
- (0:13) W&M – Darius Wilson 1-yard run (Drive: 6 plays, 45 yards, 2:29; Stony Brook 7–6)

Second quarter

- (14:57) SBU – Roland Dempster 1-yard run, Enda Kirby kick (Drive: 8 plays, 56 yards, 3:22; Stony Brook 14–6)
- (3:46) SBU – A.J. Roberts 15-yard interception, Enda Kirby kick (Stony Brook 21–6)
- (0:34) W&M – Darius Wilson 28-yard run, Eric Bernstein kick (Drive: 5 plays, 82 yards, 0:47; Stony Brook 21–13)

Third quarter

- (8:23) SBU – Cal Redman 17-yard pass from Tyler Knoop, Enda Kirby kick (Drive: 13 plays, 75 yards, 6:37; Stony Brook 28–13)

Fourth quarter

- (9:31) SBU – Roland Dempster 3-yard run, Enda Kirby kick (Drive: 6 plays, 48 yards, 3:01; Stony Brook 35–13)

Statistics	W&M	STBK
First downs	15	23
Total yards	354	462
Rushing yards	120	222
Passing yards	234	240
Passing: Comp–Att–Int	17–26–4	15–26–1
Time of possession	27:19	32:41

Team	Category	Player	Statistics
William & Mary	Passing	Darius Wilson	14/19, 197 yards, 3 INT
William & Mary	Rushing	Bronson Yoder	14 carries, 65 yards
William & Mary	Receiving	JT Mayo	3 receptions, 67 yards
Stony Brook	Passing	Tyler Knoop	15/26, 240 yards, 2 TD, INT
Stony Brook	Rushing	Roland Dempster	27 carries, 144 yards, 2 TD
Stony Brook	Receiving	Jayce Freeman	3 receptions, 101 yards, TD

=== at North Carolina A&T ===
Game Nine – No. 24 William & Mary Tribe (5–3) vs North Carolina A&T Aggies (1–7) – Game summary

Quarter	1	2	3	4	Total
No. 24 Tribe	21	7	7	10	45
Aggies	0	0	7	0	7

at Truist Stadium, Greensboro, NC

- Date: Saturday November 2, 2024
- Game time: 1:00 PM
- TV: FloSports

Game information

First quarter
Second quarter
Third quarter
Fourth quarter

=== vs. Elon ===
Game Ten – Elon Phoenix (3–6) vs No. 20 William & Mary Tribe (6–3) – Game summary

Quarter	1	2	3	4	Total
Phoenix	7	10	10	13	40
No. 20 Tribe	7	14	0	15	36

at Zable Stadium, Williamsburg, VA

- Date: Saturday November 9, 2024
- Game time: 1:00 PM
- TV: FloSports

Game information

First quarter
Second quarter
Third quarter
Fourth quarter

=== vs. Bryant ===
Game Eleven – Bryant Bulldogs (2–8) vs William & Mary Tribe (6–4) – Game summary

Quarter	1	2	3	4	Total
Bulldogs	0	9	3	0	12
Tribe	8	7	0	7	22

at Zable Stadium, Williamsburg, VA

- Date: Saturday November 16, 2024
- Game time: 1:00 PM
- TV: FloSports

Game information

First quarter
Second quarter
Third quarter
Fourth quarter

=== at No. 10 Richmond (Capital Cup) ===
Game Twelve – William & Mary Tribe (7–4) at No. 10 Richmond Spiders (9–2) – Game summary

Quarter	1	2	3	4	Total
Tribe	0	0	0	0	0
No. 10 Spiders	10	7	0	10	27

at E. Claiborne Robins Stadium • Richmond, VA

- Date: Saturday November 23, 2024
- Game time: 12:00 PM
- Game weather: Sunny
- Game attendance: 7,526
- Referee: Bill McKeever
- TV: FloSports/MASN

Game information

First quarter

- (8:43) RICH – Sean O'Haire 50-yard field goal (Drive: 7 plays, 18 yards, 3:19; Richmond 3–0)
- (2:01) RICH – Camden Coleman 3-yard run, Sean O'Haire kick (Drive: 9 plays, 66 yards, 4:33; Richmond 10–0)

Second quarter

- (2:14) RICH – Camden Coleman 1-yard run, Sean O'Haire kick (Drive: 7 plays, 31 yards, 3:28; Richmond 17–0)

Third quarter

No scoring plays

Fourth quarter

- (14:56) RICH – Sean O'Haire 30-yard field goal (Drive: 16 plays, 57 yards, 9:58; Richmond 20–0)
- (5:54) RICH – Zach Palmer-Smith 1-yard run, Sean O'Haire kick (Drive: 13 plays, 78 yards, 7:05; Richmond 27–0)

Statistics	W&M	RICH
First downs	10	20
Total yards	164	307
Rushing yards	64	238
Passing yards	100	69
Passing: Comp–Att–Int	10–20–1	9–14–1
Time of possession	24:04	35:56

Team	Category	Player	Statistics
William & Mary	Passing	Darius Wilson	9/19, 95 yards
William & Mary	Rushing	Bronson Yoder	7 carries, 32 yards
William & Mary	Receiving	Hollis Mathis	6 receptions, 50 yards
Richmond	Passing	Camden Coleman	9/14, 69 yards
Richmond	Rushing	Zach Palmer-Smith	25 carries, 129 yards, TD
Richmond	Receiving	Ja'Vion Griffin	3 receptions, 29 yards
