= Derek Robertson (American football) =

American football player

Profile
- Position: Quarterback

Personal information
- Born: Yonkers, New York, U.S.
- Listed height: 6 ft 2 in (1.88 m)
- Listed weight: 214 lb (97 kg)

Career information
- High school: Iona Prep (New Rochelle, New York)
- College: Maine (2020–2023); Monmouth (2024–2025)
- NFL draft: 2026: undrafted

Awards and highlights
- First-team All-CAA (2024); Second-team All-CAA (2025); CAA Offensive Player of the Year (2024)
- Stats at ESPN

Derek Robertson is an American football quarterback. He played collegiately for the Maine Black Bears and the Monmouth Hawks.

== Early life ==
Robertson attended Iona Preparatory School in New Rochelle, New York. As a junior, Robertson threw for 2,774 yards and 27 touchdowns. As a senior, he threw for 2,556 yards and 31 touchdowns, before committing to play college football at the University of Maine.

== College career ==
=== Maine ===
After playing sparingly in 2020, Robertson became Maine's starting quarterback following an injury to Joseph Fagnano in 2021. In his first career start against Merrimack, he threw for 141 yards and a touchdown, leading Maine to a 31–26 victory. Against William & Mary, Robertson completed 20 passes for 223 yards and two touchdowns, being named the CAA Rookie of the Week. Against Rhode Island, he threw for four touchdowns in a 45–24 victory. He finished the season with 121 completions for 1,505 yards and 12 touchdowns before returning to his duties as backup when Fagnano returned from injury the following season. Robertson was named the starting quarterback in 2023 following Fagnano's decision to transfer to UConn. Against Stony Brook, Robertson threw for a then-career-high 394 yards and five touchdowns, before a three-touchdown performance against Long Island a couple of weeks later. The following week, he set a Maine school record for most passing yards in a single game, throwing for 503 yards in a 28–34 loss. He finished the season throwing for 2,897 yards and 25 touchdowns, before entering the transfer portal.

=== Monmouth ===
On January 5, 2024, Robertson announced that he would be transferring to Monmouth University to play for the Monmouth Hawks. Against his former team, Maine, Robertson threw for 390 yards and four touchdowns, leading Monmouth to a 51–22 victory. Against Stony Brook, he threw for a school record and career-high 536 yards and three touchdowns, in a 55–47 win. Robertson finished the season throwing for 3,937 yards and 31 touchdowns, being named the CAA Offensive Player of the Year. He announced that he would return to Monmouth for the 2025 season, confirmed on January 16. Against Hampton, Robertson suffered an injury that forced him to miss the rest of the season.

=== Statistics ===
Season	Team	Games			Passing								Rushing			
Season	Team	GP	GS	Record	Cmp	Att	Pct	Yds	Avg	TD	Int	Rtg	Att	Yds	Avg	TD
2020	Maine	1	0	0–0	4	4	100.0	28	7.0	0	0	158.8	–	–	–	–
2021	Maine	8	7	4–3	121	238	50.8	1,506	6.3	12	4	117.3	19	4	0.2	0
2022	Maine	1	0	0–0	0	1	0.0	0	0.0	0	0	0.0	–	–	–	–
2023	Maine	11	11	2–9	256	402	63.7	2,897	7.2	25	13	138.3	28	-101	-3.6	0
2024	Monmouth	12	12	6–6	283	434	65.2	3,937	9.1	31	6	162.2	26	-34	-1.3	0
2025	Monmouth	7	7	6–1	189	265	71.3	2,439	9.2	27	5	178.5	15	-55	-3.7	1
Career		40	37	18−19	853	1,344	63.5	10,807	8.0	95	28	150.2	88	-186	-2.1	1

== Professional career ==
Pre-draft measurables
Height	Weight	Arm length	Hand span	Wingspan	40-yard dash	10-yard split	20-yard split	20-yard shuttle	Three-cone drill	Vertical jump	Broad jump
6 ft 1 5/8 in (1.87 m)	214 lb (97 kg)	31 1/2 in (0.80 m)	9 3/8 in (0.24 m)	6 ft 4 in (1.93 m)	4.73 s	1.69 s	2.76 s	4.40 s	7.43 s	31.0 in (0.79 m)	9 ft 5 in (2.87 m)
All values from Pro Day

In May 2026, Robertson was invited to the Jacksonville Jaguars rookie minicamp. He was not offered a contract.
