= 2024 Elon Phoenix football team =

American college football season

2024 Elon Phoenix football
- Conference: CAA Football
- Record: 6–6 (5–3 CAA)
- Head coach: Tony Trisciani (6th season)
- Offensive coordinator: Drew Folmar (8th season)
- Defensive coordinator: Dovonte Edwards (3rd season)
- Home stadium: Rhodes Stadium

2024 Coastal Athletic Association Football Conference standings
	Conf.			Overall
Team	W		L	W		L
No. 15 Richmond +^	8	–	0	10	–	3
No. 9 Rhode Island* +^	7	–	1	11	–	3
No. 12 Villanova ^	6	–	2	10	–	4
Delaware*	6	–	2	9	–	2
No. 23 New Hampshire ^	6	–	2	8	–	5
Stony Brook	5	–	3	8	–	4
Towson	5	–	3	7	–	5
Elon	5	–	3	6	–	6
William & Mary	4	–	4	7	–	5
Monmouth	4	–	4	6	–	6
Maine	3	–	5	5	–	7
Albany	2	–	6	4	–	8
Hampton	2	–	6	5	–	7
Campbell	1	–	7	3	–	9
Bryant	0	–	8	2	–	10
North Carolina A&T	0	–	8	1	–	11
+ – Conference co-champions; ^ – FCS playoff participant; * Delaware ineligible for rankings and 2024 FCS playoffs due to transition to the FBS. Richmond and Rhode Island named co-champions as Rhode Island's only CAA loss was to Delaware.; Rankings from STATS Poll

The 2024 Elon Phoenix football team represented Elon University as a member of the Coastal Athletic Association Football Conference (CAA) during the 2024 NCAA Division I FCS football season. The Phoenix were led by sixth-year head coach Tony Trisciani and played their home games at Rhodes Stadium in Elon, North Carolina.

== Schedule ==
Date	Time	Opponent	Rank	Site	TV	Result	Attendance
August 30	7:30 p.m.	at Duke*		Wallace Wade Stadium; Durham, NC	ACC Network	L 3–26	18,466
September 7	6:00 p.m.	at North Carolina Central*		O'Kelly–Riddick Stadium; Durham, NC	ESPN+	W 41–19	5,706
September 14	6:00 p.m.	Western Carolina*	No. 22	Rhodes Stadium; Elon, NC	FloSports	L 17–24	5,104
September 21	6:00 p.m.	East Tennessee State*		Rhodes Stadium; Elon, NC	FloSports	L 14–34	4,521
September 28	2:00 p.m.	Richmond		Rhodes Stadium; Elon, NC	FloSports	L 17–27	12,589
October 12	2:00 p.m.	New Hampshire		Rhodes Stadium; Elon, NC	FloSports	L 10–17	4,315
October 19	3:30 p.m.	at Albany		Bob Ford Field; Albany, NY	FloSports	W 30–14	7,204
October 26	2:00 p.m.	at Hampton		Armstrong Stadium; Hampton, VA	FloSports	L 21–41	6,027
November 2	2:00 p.m.	Campbell^{†}		Rhodes Stadium; Elon, NC	FloSports	W 50–27	7,583
November 9	1:00 p.m.	at No. 20 William & Mary		Zable Stadium; Williamsburg, VA	FloSports	W 40–36	8,131
November 16	2:00 p.m.	Maine		Rhodes Stadium; Elon, NC	FloSports	W 31–25	2,835
November 23	1:00 p.m.	at North Carolina A&T		Truist Stadium; Greensboro, NC	FloSports	W 31–21	3,033
*Non-conference game; ^{†}Homecoming; Rankings from STATS Poll released prior to the game; All times are in Eastern time

== Game summaries ==
=== at Duke (FBS) ===
Game One – Elon Phoenix (0-0) vs Duke Blue Devils (FBS) (0-0) – Game summary

Quarter	1	2	3	4	Total
Phoenix	0	0	0	0	0
Blue Devils (FBS)	3	7	9	0	19

at Wallace Wade Stadium • Durham, NC

- Date: August 30
- Game time: 7:30 p.m. EST
- Game attendance: 18,466
- Referee: Gary Patterson
- TV announcers (ACCN): Clay Matvick (play-by-play) and Steve Addazio (analyst)

Game information

First quarter

- (8:09) DUKE - Todd Pelino 32-yard field goal (Drive: 14 plays, 68 yards, 05:28; Duke 3-0)

Second quarter

- (00:57) DUKE - Jaquez Moore 7-yard run (Todd Pelino kick) (Drive: 3 plays, 69 yards, 00:47; Duke 10-0)

Third quarter

- (11:42) DUKE - Todd Pelino 42-yard field goal (Drive: 11 plays, 45 yards, 03:18; Duke 13-0)
- (06:18) DUKE - Jeremiah Hasley 1-yard pass from Maalik Murphy (Drive: 3 plays, 51 yards, 00:52; Duke 19-0)

Fourth quarter

- (04:06) DUKE - Eli Pancol 7-yard pass from Maalik Murphy (Todd Pelino kick) (Drive: 10 plays, 63 yards, 05:45; Duke 26-0)
- (00:14) ELON - Jack Berkowitz 39-yard field goal (Drive: 11 plays, 54 yards, 03:52; Elon 3-26)

Statistics	ELON	DUKE
First downs	11	17
Total yards	140	350
Rushing yards	30	59
Passing yards	110	291
Passing: Comp–Att–Int	16-24-0	26-40-1
Time of possession	33:10	26:50

Team	Category	Player	Statistics
Elon	Passing	Matthew Downing	11/17, 72 yards
Elon	Rushing	Rushawn Baker	10 carries, 36 yards
Elon	Receiving	Jamerien Dalton	3 receptions, 32 yards
Duke	Passing	Maalik Murphy	26/40, 291 yards, 2 TD, INT
Duke	Rushing	Jaquez Moore	10 carries, 24 yards, TD
Duke	Receiving	Jordan Moore	7 receptions, 112 yards

=== at North Carolina Central ===
Game Two – Elon Phoenix (0–1) at North Carolina Central Eagles (1–0) – Game summary

Quarter	1	2	3	4	Total
Phoenix	0	0	0	0	0
Eagles	0	0	0	0	0

at O'Kelly–Riddick Stadium • Durham, NC

- Date: Saturday, September 7, 2024
- Game time: 6:00 p.m.
- TV: ESPN+

Game information

First quarter
Second quarter
Third quarter
Fourth quarter

Statistics	ELON	NCCU
First downs		
Total yards		
Rushing yards		
Passing yards		
Passing: Comp–Att–Int		
Time of possession		

Team	Category	Player	Statistics
Elon	Passing		
Elon	Rushing		
Elon	Receiving		
North Carolina Central	Passing		
North Carolina Central	Rushing		
North Carolina Central	Receiving		

=== Western Carolina ===
Game Three – Western Carolina Catamounts (0–2) vs No. 22 Elon Phoenix (1–1) – Game summary

Quarter	1	2	3	4	Total
Catamounts	0	0	0	0	0
No. 22 Phoenix	0	0	0	0	0

at Rhodes Stadium, Elon, NC

- Date: Saturday September 14, 2024
- Game time: 6:00 PM
- TV: FloSports

Game information

First quarter
Second quarter
Third quarter
Fourth quarter

Statistics	WCU	ELON
First downs		
Total yards		
Rushing yards		
Passing yards		
Passing: Comp–Att–Int		
Time of possession		

Team	Category	Player	Statistics
Western Carolina	Passing		
Western Carolina	Rushing		
Western Carolina	Receiving		
Elon	Passing		
Elon	Rushing		
Elon	Receiving		

=== East Tennessee State ===
Game Four – East Tennessee State Buccaneers (1–2) vs Elon Phoenix (1–2) – Game summary

Quarter	1	2	3	4	Total
Buccaneers	17	0	14	3	34
Phoenix	0	7	7	0	14

at Rhodes Stadium, Elon, NC

- Date: Saturday September 21, 2024
- Game time: 6:00 PM
- Game weather: Cloudy • Temperature: 80 °F (27 °C) • Wind: SW 5 mph
- Game attendance: 4,521
- Referee: Bill McKeever
- TV announcers (FloSports): Taylor Durham, Khirey Walker, Hannah Bradey

Game information

First quarter

- (11:46) ETSU - Bryson Irby 4-yard run, Ewan Johnson kick (Drive: 9 plays, 75 yards, 3:14; East Tennessee State 7-0)
- (10:38) ETSU - Jaylen King 8-yard run, Ewan Johnson kick (Drive: 2 plays, 32 yards, 0:58; East Tennessee State 14-0)
- (5:28) ETSU - Ewan Johnson 30-yard field goal (Drive: 9 plays, 79 yards, 3:29; East Tennessee State 17-0)

Second quarter

- (14:56) ELON - TJ Thomas Jr. 3-yard run, Jack Berkowitz kick (Drive: 11 plays, 70 yards, 5:25; East Tennessee State 17-7)

Third quarter

- (9:53) ETSU - Jaylen King 10-yard run, Ewan Johnson kick (Drive: 8 plays, 69 yards, 3:22; East Tennessee State 24-7)
- (6:40) ETSU - Khamran Laborn 17-yard run, Ewan Johnson kick (Drive: 5 plays, 75 yards, 2:20; East Tennessee State 31-7)
- (3:05) ELON - Chandler Brayboy 15-yard pass from Matthew Downing, Jack Berkowitz kick (Drive: 7 plays, 66 yards, 3:29; East Tennessee State 31-14)

Fourth quarter

- (0:59) ETSU - Ewan Johnson 25-yard field goal (Drive: 11 plays, 37 yards, 6:22; East Tennessee State 34-14)

Statistics	ETSU	ELON
First downs	22	16
Total yards	489	271
Rushing yards	256	84
Passing yards	233	187
Passing: Comp–Att–Int	17-28-0	16-27-0
Time of possession	32:29	27:31

Team	Category	Player	Statistics
East Tennessee State	Passing	Jaylen King	17-28, 233 yards
East Tennessee State	Rushing	Bryson Irby	16 carries, 96 yards, TD
East Tennessee State	Receiving	Hakeem Meggett	2 receptions, 85 yards
Elon	Passing	Matthew Downing	12-20, 129 yards, TD
Elon	Rushing	Rushawn Baker	11 carries, 48 yards
Elon	Receiving	Jamarien Dalton	5 reception, 71 yards

=== Richmond ===
Game Five – Richmond Spiders (2–2) vs Elon Phoenix (1–3) – Game summary

Quarter	1	2	3	4	Total
Spiders	3	17	7	0	27
Phoenix	0	7	3	7	17

at Rhodes Stadium, Elon, NC

- Date: Saturday September 28, 2024
- Game time: 2:00 PM
- Game weather: Cloudy • Temperature: 80 °F (27 °C) • Wind: SW 9 mph
- Game attendance: 12,589
- TV: FloSports

Game information

First quarter
Second quarter
Third quarter
Fourth quarter

Statistics	RICH	ELON
First downs	20	23
Total yards	439	382
Rushing yards	236	161
Passing yards	203	221
Passing: Comp–Att–Int	15–22–0	19–30–2
Time of possession	30:05	29:55

Team	Category	Player	Statistics
Richmond	Passing	Camden Coleman	15–22, 203 yards
Richmond	Rushing	Zach Palmer-Smith	24 carries, 167 yards, 1 TD
Richmond	Receiving	Landon Ellis	5 receptions, 64 yards
Elon	Passing	Jack Salopek	14–21, 187 yards, 1 TD
Elon	Rushing	Rushawn Baker	9 carries, 66 yards, 1 TD
Elon	Receiving	Chandler Brayboy	6 receptions, 88 yards

=== New Hampshire ===
Game Six – New Hampshire Wildcats (3–2) vs Elon Phoenix (1–4) – Game summary

Quarter	1	2	3	4	Total
Wildcats	0	7	7	3	17
Phoenix	10	0	0	0	10

at Rhodes Stadium, Elon, NC

- Date: Saturday October 12, 2024
- Game time: 2:00 PM
- Game weather: Sunny • Temperature: 75 °F (24 °C) • Wind: W 5 mph
- Game attendance: 4,315
- Referee: Paul Matt Overton
- TV announcers (FloSports): Taylor Durham (play-by-play), Khirey Walker (analyst) and Hannah Bradley (sideline)

Game information

First quarter

- (10:56) ELO – Jack Berkowitz 41-yard field goal (Drive: 7 plays, 51 yards, 4:04; Elon 3–0)
- (5:11) ELO – TJ Thomas Jr. 39-yard run, Jack Berkowitz kick (Drive: 6 plays, 77 yards, 2:40; Elon 10–0)

Second quarter

- (0:10) UNH – Logan Tomlinson 10-yard pass from Seth Morgan, Nick Mazzie kick (Drive: 1 play, 10 yards, 0:09; Elon 10–7)

Third quarter

- (8:13) UNH – Logan Tomlinson 4-yard run, Nick Mazzie kick (Drive: 6 plays, 52 yards, 3:47; New Hampshire 14–10)

Fourth quarter

- (14:06) UNH – Nick Mazzie 38-yard field goal (Drive: 12 plays, 57 yards, 7:05; New Hampshire 17–10)

Statistics	UNH	ELON
First downs	14	11
Total yards	158	231
Rushing yards	39	46
Passing yards	119	185
Passing: Comp–Att–Int	16–29–1	17–30–1
Time of possession	29:34	30:26

Team	Category	Player	Statistics
New Hampshire	Passing	Seth Morgan	16/29, 119 yards, TD, INT
New Hampshire	Rushing	Isaac Seide	20 carries, 51 yards
New Hampshire	Receiving	Joey Corcoran	5 receptions, 62 yards
Elon	Passing	Jack Salopek	17/29, 185 yards, INT
Elon	Rushing	TJ Thomas Jr.	9 carries, 78 yards, TD
Elon	Receiving	Chandler Brayboy	5 receptions, 72 yards

=== at Albany ===
Game Seven – Elon Phoenix (1–5) vs Albany Great Danes (3–3) – Game summary

Quarter	1	2	3	4	Total
Phoenix	0	0	0	0	0
Great Danes	0	0	0	0	0

at Bob Ford Field at Tom & Mary Casey Stadium • Albany, NY

- Date: Saturday October 19, 2024
- Game time: 3:30 PM EST
- Game weather: 0 °F (−18 °C)
- TV announcers (FloSports): TBD

Game information

First quarter
Second quarter
Third quarter
Fourth quarter

Statistics	ELON	ALB
First downs		
Total yards		
Rushing yards		
Passing yards		
Passing: Comp–Att–Int		
Time of possession		

Team	Category	Player	Statistics
Elon	Passing		
Elon	Rushing		
Elon	Receiving		
Albany	Passing		
Albany	Rushing		
Albany	Receiving		

=== at Hampton ===
Game Eight – Elon Phoenix (2–5) at Hampton Pirates (4–3) – Game summary

Quarter	1	2	3	4	Total
Phoenix	0	0	0	0	0
Pirates	0	0	0	0	0

at Armstrong Stadium, Hampton, VA

- Date: Saturday October 26, 2024
- Game time: 2:00 PM
- TV: FloSports

Game information

First quarter
Second quarter
Third quarter
Fourth quarter

Statistics	ELON	HAMP
First downs		
Total yards		
Rushing yards		
Passing yards		
Passing: Comp–Att–Int		
Time of possession		

Team	Category	Player	Statistics
Elon	Passing		
Elon	Rushing		
Elon	Receiving		
Hampton	Passing		
Hampton	Rushing		
Hampton	Receiving		

=== Campbell ===
Game Nine – Campbell Fighting Camels (3–5) vs Elon Phoenix (2–6) – Game summary

Quarter	1	2	3	4	Total
Fighting Camels	0	0	0	0	0
Phoenix	0	0	0	0	0

at Rhodes Stadium, Elon, NC

- Date: Saturday November 2, 2024
- Game time: 2:00 PM
- TV: FloSports

Game information

First quarter
Second quarter
Third quarter
Fourth quarter

Statistics	CAM	ELON
First downs		
Total yards		
Rushing yards		
Passing yards		
Passing: Comp–Att–Int		
Time of possession		

Team	Category	Player	Statistics
Campbell	Passing		
Campbell	Rushing		
Campbell	Receiving		
Elon	Passing		
Elon	Rushing		
Elon	Receiving		

=== at No. 20 William & Mary ===
Game Ten – Elon Phoenix (3–6) vs No. 20 William & Mary Tribe (6–3) – Game summary

Quarter	1	2	3	4	Total
Phoenix	7	10	10	13	40
No. 20 Tribe	7	14	0	15	36

at Zable Stadium, Williamsburg, VA

- Date: Saturday November 9, 2024
- Game time: 1:00 PM
- TV: FloSports

Game information

First quarter
Second quarter
Third quarter
Fourth quarter

Statistics	ELON	W&M
First downs		
Total yards		
Rushing yards		
Passing yards		
Passing: Comp–Att–Int		
Time of possession		

Team	Category	Player	Statistics
Elon	Passing		
Elon	Rushing		
Elon	Receiving		
William & Mary	Passing		
William & Mary	Rushing		
William & Mary	Receiving		

=== Maine ===
Game Eleven – Maine Black Bears (5–5) vs Elon Phoenix (4–6) – Game summary

Quarter	1	2	3	4	Total
Black Bears	3	7	8	7	25
Phoenix	7	7	14	3	31

at Rhodes Stadium • Elon, NC

- Date: Saturday November 16, 2024
- Game time: 2:00 PM EST
- Game weather: 62 °F (17 °C)
- Game attendance: 2,835
- TV announcers (FloSports): TBD

Game information

First quarter
Second quarter
Third quarter
Fourth quarter

Statistics	ME	ELON
First downs	17	17
Total yards	330	486
Rushing yards	59	187
Passing yards	271	299
Passing: Comp–Att–Int	22-38-1	17-26-0
Time of possession	28:27	31:33

Team	Category	Player	Statistics
Maine	Passing	Carter Peevy	22-38-1, TD, INT
Maine	Rushing	Jaharie Martin	7 carries, 26 yards, 2 TD
Maine	Receiving	Montigo Moss	5 receptions, 89 yards, TD
Elon	Passing	Matthew Downing	17-26-0, TD
Elon	Rushing	Rushawn Baker	27 carries, 168 yards, 3 TD
Elon	Receiving	Chandler Brayboy	3 receptions, 138 yards, TD

=== at North Carolina A&T ===
Game Twelve – Elon Phoenix (0–0) vs North Carolina A&T Aggies (0–0) – Game summary

Quarter	1	2	3	4	Total
Phoenix	0	0	0	0	0
Aggies	0	0	0	0	0

at Truist Stadium, Greensboro, NC

- Date: Saturday November 23, 2024
- Game time: 1:00 PM
- TV: FloSports

Game information

First quarter
Second quarter
Third quarter
Fourth quarter

Statistics	ELON	NCAT
First downs		
Total yards		
Rushing yards		
Passing yards		
Passing: Comp–Att–Int		
Time of possession		

Team	Category	Player	Statistics
Elon	Passing		
Elon	Rushing		
Elon	Receiving		
North Carolina A&T	Passing		
North Carolina A&T	Rushing		
North Carolina A&T	Receiving		
