= 2024 Hampton Pirates football team =

American college football season

2024 Hampton Pirates football
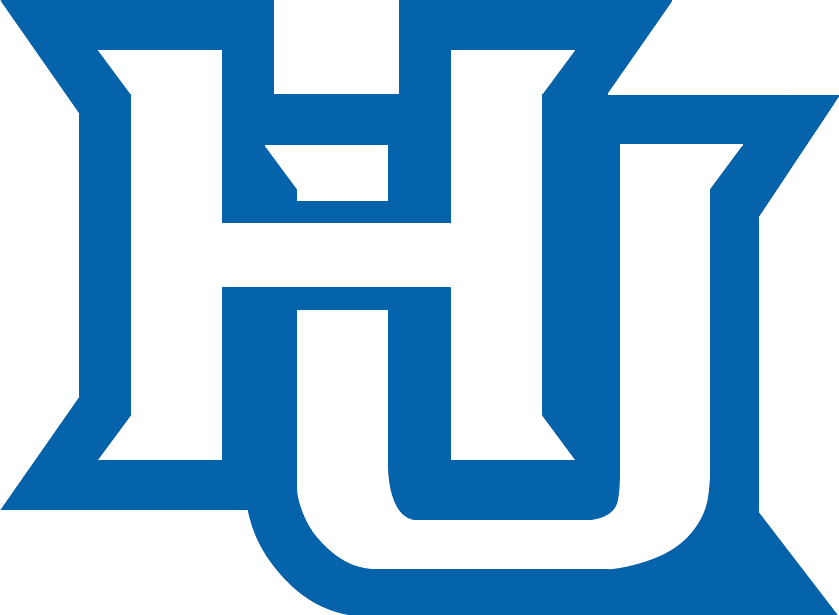
- Conference: CAA Football
- Record: 5–7 (2–6 CAA)
- Head coach: Trenton Boykin (interim; 1st season)
- Defensive coordinator: Todd McComb (5th season)
- Home stadium: Armstrong Stadium

2024 Coastal Athletic Association Football Conference standings
	Conf.			Overall
Team	W		L	W		L
No. 15 Richmond +^	8	–	0	10	–	3
No. 9 Rhode Island* +^	7	–	1	11	–	3
No. 12 Villanova ^	6	–	2	10	–	4
Delaware*	6	–	2	9	–	2
No. 23 New Hampshire ^	6	–	2	8	–	5
Stony Brook	5	–	3	8	–	4
Towson	5	–	3	7	–	5
Elon	5	–	3	6	–	6
William & Mary	4	–	4	7	–	5
Monmouth	4	–	4	6	–	6
Maine	3	–	5	5	–	7
Albany	2	–	6	4	–	8
Hampton	2	–	6	5	–	7
Campbell	1	–	7	3	–	9
Bryant	0	–	8	2	–	10
North Carolina A&T	0	–	8	1	–	11
+ – Conference co-champions; ^ – FCS playoff participant; * Delaware ineligible for rankings and 2024 FCS playoffs due to transition to the FBS. Richmond and Rhode Island named co-champions as Rhode Island's only CAA loss was to Delaware.; Rankings from STATS Poll

The 2024 Hampton Pirates football team represented Hampton University as a member of the Coastal Athletic Association Football Conference (CAA) during the 2024 NCAA Division I FCS football season. The Pirates were led by interim first-year head coach Trenton Boykin, and played home games at Armstrong Stadium in Hampton, Virginia.

== Schedule ==
Date	Time	Opponent	Site	TV	Result	Attendance
August 31	6:00 p.m.	Morgan State*	Armstrong Stadium; Hampton, VA	FloSports	L 28–30	7,714
September 7	6:00 p.m.	Virginia Union*	Armstrong Stadium; Hampton, VA	FloSports	W 33–21	6,308
September 14	4:00 p.m.	at Norfolk State*	William "Dick" Price Stadium; Norfolk, VA (Battle of the Bay)	ESPN+	W 37–7	1,511
September 21	3:30 p.m.	vs. Howard*	Audi Field; Washington, D.C. (The Real HU / Truth and Service Classic)	ESPN+	W 27–20	16,813
September 28	6:00 p.m.	at No. 11 William & Mary	Zable Stadium; Williamsburg, VA	FloSports	L 7–49	11,317
October 5	2:00 p.m.	No. 20 Rhode Island	Armstrong Stadium; Hampton, VA	FloSports	L 44–46 ^{2OT}	1,729
October 19	1:00 p.m.	at North Carolina A&T	Truist Stadium; Greensboro, NC	FloSports	W 59–17	23,016
October 26	2:00 p.m.	Elon^{†}	Armstrong Stadium; Hampton, VA	FloSports	W 41–21	6,027
November 2	1:00 p.m.	No. 13 Villanova	Armstrong Stadium; Hampton, VA	FloSports	L 14–20	1,454
November 9	1:00 p.m.	at Towson	Johnny Unitas Stadium; Towson, MD	FloSports	L 10–27	4,004
November 16	1:00 p.m.	No. 11 Richmond	Armstrong Stadium; Hampton, VA	FloSports	L 21–24	1,657
November 23	1:00 p.m.	at Albany	Bob Ford Field; Albany, NY	FloSports	L 34–41	2,143
*Non-conference game; ^{†}Homecoming; Rankings from STATS Poll released prior to the game; All times are in Eastern time

== Game summaries ==
=== Morgan State ===
Game One – Morgan State Bears (0–0) at Hampton Pirates (0–0) – Game summary

Quarter	1	2	3	4	Total
Bears	0	0	0	0	0
Pirates	0	0	0	0	0

at Armstrong Stadium, Hampton, VA

- Date: Saturday August 31, 2024
- Game time: 6:00 p.m.
- Game attendance: 7,714
- TV: FloSports

Game information

First quarter
Second quarter
Third quarter
Fourth quarter

Statistics	MORG	HAMP
First downs		
Total yards		
Rushing yards		
Passing yards		
Passing: Comp–Att–Int		
Time of possession		

Team	Category	Player	Statistics
Morgan State	Passing		
Morgan State	Rushing		
Morgan State	Receiving		
Hampton	Passing		
Hampton	Rushing		
Hampton	Receiving		

=== Virginia Union (DII) ===
Game Two – Virginia Union Panthers (DII) (1–0) at Hampton Pirates (0–1) – Game summary

Quarter	1	2	3	4	Total
Panthers (DII)	0	0	0	0	0
Pirates	0	0	0	0	0

at Armstrong Stadium, Hampton, VA

- Date: Saturday September 7, 2024
- Game time: 6:00 p.m.
- TV announcers: FloSports

Game information

First quarter
Second quarter
Third quarter
Fourth quarter

Statistics	VU	HAMP
First downs		
Total yards		
Rushing yards		
Passing yards		
Passing: Comp–Att–Int		
Time of possession		

Team	Category	Player	Statistics
Virginia Union	Passing		
Virginia Union	Rushing		
Virginia Union	Receiving		
Hampton	Passing		
Hampton	Rushing		
Hampton	Receiving		

=== at Norfolk State (Battle of the Bay) ===
Game Three – Hampton Pirates (1–1) vs Norfolk State Spartans (1–2) – Game summary

Quarter	1	2	3	4	Total
Pirates	0	0	0	0	0
Spartans	0	0	0	0	0

at William "Dick" Price Stadium, Norfolk, Virginia

- Date: Saturday September 14, 2024
- Game time: 4:00 p.m.
- TV: ESPN+

Game information

First quarter
Second quarter
Third quarter
Fourth quarter

Statistics	HAMP	NORF
First downs		
Total yards		
Rushing yards		
Passing yards		
Passing: Comp–Att–Int		
Time of possession		

Team	Category	Player	Statistics
Hampton	Passing		
Hampton	Rushing		
Hampton	Receiving		
Norfolk State	Passing		
Norfolk State	Rushing		
Norfolk State	Receiving		

=== vs. Howard (The Real HU) ===
Game Four – Hampton Pirates (2–1) at Howard Bison (2–1) – Game summary

Quarter	1	2	3	4	Total
Pirates	0	0	0	0	0
Bison	0	0	0	0	0

at Audi Field • Washington, D.C.

- Date: Saturday September 21, 2024
- Game time: 3:30 p.m.
- Game weather: 0 °F (−18 °C)
- TV: ESPN+

Game information

First quarter
Second quarter
Third quarter
Fourth quarter

Statistics	HAMP	HOW
First downs		
Total yards		
Rushing yards		
Passing yards		
Passing: Comp–Att–Int		
Time of possession		

Team	Category	Player	Statistics
Hampton	Passing		
Hampton	Rushing		
Hampton	Receiving		
Howard	Passing		
Howard	Rushing		
Howard	Receiving		

=== at No. 11 William & Mary ===
Game Five – Hampton Pirates (3–1) vs No. 11 William & Mary Tribe (3–1) – Game summary

Quarter	1	2	3	4	Total
Pirates	7	0	0	0	7
No. 11 Tribe	7	14	7	21	49

at Zable Stadium, Williamsburg, VA

- Date: Saturday September 28, 2024
- Game time: 6:00 PM
- TV: FloSports

Game information

First quarter
Second quarter
Third quarter
Fourth quarter

Statistics	HAMP	W&M
First downs		
Total yards		
Rushing yards		
Passing yards		
Passing: Comp–Att–Int		
Time of possession		

Team	Category	Player	Statistics
Hampton	Passing		
Hampton	Rushing		
Hampton	Receiving		
William & Mary	Passing		
William & Mary	Rushing		
William & Mary	Receiving		

=== No. 20 Rhode Island ===
Game Six – No. 20 Rhode Island Rams (3–1) at Hampton Pirates (3–2) – Game summary

Quarter	1	2	3	4	Total
No. 20 Rams	0	0	0	0	0
Pirates	0	0	0	0	0

at Armstrong Stadium, Hampton, VA

- Date: Saturday October 5, 2024
- Game time: 2:00 p.m.
- TV: FloSports

Game information

First quarter
Second quarter
Third quarter
Fourth quarter

Statistics	URI	HAMP
First downs		
Total yards		
Rushing yards		
Passing yards		
Passing: Comp–Att–Int		
Time of possession		

Team	Category	Player	Statistics
Rhode Island	Passing		
Rhode Island	Rushing		
Rhode Island	Receiving		
Hampton	Passing		
Hampton	Rushing		
Hampton	Receiving		

=== at North Carolina A&T ===
Game Seven – Hampton Pirates (3–3) vs North Carolina A&T Aggies (1–5) – Game summary

Quarter	1	2	3	4	Total
Pirates	0	0	0	0	0
Aggies	0	0	0	0	0

at Truist Stadium, Greensboro, NC

- Date: Saturday October 19, 2024
- Game time: 1:00 PM
- TV: FloSports

Game information

First quarter
Second quarter
Third quarter
Fourth quarter

Statistics	HAMP	NCAT
First downs		
Total yards		
Rushing yards		
Passing yards		
Passing: Comp–Att–Int		
Time of possession		

Team	Category	Player	Statistics
Hampton	Passing		
Hampton	Rushing		
Hampton	Receiving		
North Carolina A&T	Passing		
North Carolina A&T	Rushing		
North Carolina A&T	Receiving		

=== Elon ===
Game Eight – Elon Phoenix (2–5) at Hampton Pirates (4–3) – Game summary

Quarter	1	2	3	4	Total
Phoenix	0	0	0	0	0
Pirates	0	0	0	0	0

at Armstrong Stadium, Hampton, VA

- Date: Saturday October 26, 2024
- Game time: 2:00 p.m.
- TV: FloSports

Game information

First quarter
Second quarter
Third quarter
Fourth quarter

Statistics	ELON	HAMP
First downs		
Total yards		
Rushing yards		
Passing yards		
Passing: Comp–Att–Int		
Time of possession		

Team	Category	Player	Statistics
Elon	Passing		
Elon	Rushing		
Elon	Receiving		
Hampton	Passing		
Hampton	Rushing		
Hampton	Receiving		

=== No. 13 Villanova ===
Game Nine – No. 13 Villanova Wildcats (6–2) at Hampton Pirates (5–3) – Game summary

Quarter	1	2	3	4	Total
No. 13 Wildcats	0	0	0	0	0
Pirates	0	0	0	0	0

at Armstrong Stadium, Hampton, VA

- Date: Saturday November 2, 2024
- Game time: 1:00 p.m.
- TV: FloSports

Game information

First quarter
Second quarter
Third quarter
Fourth quarter

Statistics	VILL	HAMP
First downs		
Total yards		
Rushing yards		
Passing yards		
Passing: Comp–Att–Int		
Time of possession		

Team	Category	Player	Statistics
Villanova	Passing		
Villanova	Rushing		
Villanova	Receiving		
Hampton	Passing		
Hampton	Rushing		
Hampton	Receiving		

=== at Towson ===
Game Ten – Hampton Pirates (5–4) vs Towson Tigers (4–5) – Game summary

Quarter	1	2	3	4	Total
Pirates	0	0	0	0	0
Tigers	0	0	0	0	0

at Johnny Unitas Stadium, Towson, MD

- Date: Saturday November 9, 2024
- Game time: 1:00 PM
- TV: FloSports

Game information

First quarter
Second quarter
Third quarter
Fourth quarter

Statistics	HAMP	TOW
First downs		
Total yards		
Rushing yards		
Passing yards		
Passing: Comp–Att–Int		
Time of possession		

Team	Category	Player	Statistics
Hampton	Passing		
Hampton	Rushing		
Hampton	Receiving		
Towson	Passing		
Towson	Rushing		
Towson	Receiving		

=== No. 11 Richmond ===
Game Eleven – No. 11 Richmond Spiders (8–2) at Hampton Pirates (5–5) – Game summary

Quarter	1	2	3	4	Total
No. 11 Spiders	14	3	7	0	24
Pirates	7	0	7	7	21

at Armstrong Stadium • Hampton, VA

- Date: Saturday November 16, 2024
- Game time: 1:00 p.m.
- Game weather: Sunny • Temperature: 61 °F (16 °C) • Wind: W 8 mph
- Game attendance: 1,657
- TV: FloSports

Game information

First quarter
Second quarter
Third quarter
Fourth quarter

Statistics	RICH	HAMP
First downs	16	24
Total yards	322	391
Rushing yards	184	194
Passing yards	138	197
Passing: Comp–Att–Int	13–18–0	19–31–0
Time of possession	30:27	29:33

Team	Category	Player	Statistics
Richmond	Passing	Camden Coleman	13–18, 138 yards, TD
Richmond	Rushing	Zach Palmer-Smith	27 carries, 166 yards, 2 TD
Richmond	Receiving	Landon Ellis	5 receptions, 70 yards, TD
Hampton	Passing	Malcolm Mays	9–19, 107 yards, TD
Hampton	Rushing	Tymere Robinson	16 carries, 59 yards, TD
Hampton	Receiving	Brennan Ridley	5 receptions, 74 yards, TD

=== at Albany ===
Game Twelve – Hampton Pirates (5–6) vs Albany Great Danes (3–8) – Game summary

Quarter	1	2	3	4	Total
Pirates	14	14	0	6	34
Great Danes	0	7	10	25	42

at Bob Ford Field, Albany, NY

- Date: Saturday November 23, 2024
- Game time: 1:00 PM
- Game attendance: 2,341
- TV: FloSports

Game information

First quarter
Second quarter
Third quarter
Fourth quarter

Statistics	HAMP	ALB
First downs		
Total yards		
Rushing yards		
Passing yards		
Passing: Comp–Att–Int		
Time of possession		

Team	Category	Player	Statistics
Hampton	Passing		
Hampton	Rushing		
Hampton	Receiving		
Albany	Passing		
Albany	Rushing		
Albany	Receiving		
