= 2024 Towson Tigers football team =

American college football season

2024 Towson Tigers football
- Conference: CAA Football Conference
- Record: 7–5 (5–3 CAA)
- Head coach: Pete Shinnick (2nd season)
- Offensive coordinator: Brian Sheppard (2nd season)
- Defensive coordinator: Darian Dulin (2nd season)
- Home stadium: Johnny Unitas Stadium

2024 Coastal Athletic Association Football Conference standings
	Conf.			Overall
Team	W		L	W		L
No. 15 Richmond +^	8	–	0	10	–	3
No. 9 Rhode Island* +^	7	–	1	11	–	3
No. 12 Villanova ^	6	–	2	10	–	4
Delaware*	6	–	2	9	–	2
No. 23 New Hampshire ^	6	–	2	8	–	5
Stony Brook	5	–	3	8	–	4
Towson	5	–	3	7	–	5
Elon	5	–	3	6	–	6
William & Mary	4	–	4	7	–	5
Monmouth	4	–	4	6	–	6
Maine	3	–	5	5	–	7
Albany	2	–	6	4	–	8
Hampton	2	–	6	5	–	7
Campbell	1	–	7	3	–	9
Bryant	0	–	8	2	–	10
North Carolina A&T	0	–	8	1	–	11
+ – Conference co-champions; ^ – FCS playoff participant; * Delaware ineligible for rankings and 2024 FCS playoffs due to transition to the FBS. Richmond and Rhode Island named co-champions as Rhode Island's only CAA loss was to Delaware.; Rankings from STATS Poll

The 2024 Towson Tigers football team represented Towson University as a member of the Coastal Athletic Association Football Conference (CAA) during the 2024 NCAA Division I FCS football season. They were led by second-year head coach Pete Shinnick and played home games at Johnny Unitas Stadium located in Towson, Maryland.

== Schedule ==
Date	Time	Opponent	Site	TV	Result	Attendance
August 31	2:30 p.m.	at Cincinnati*	Nippert Stadium; Cincinnati, OH	ESPN+	L 20–38	37,654
September 7	6:00 p.m.	Morgan State*	Johnny Unitas Stadium; Towson, MD	FloSports	W 14–9	8,394
September 14	3:30 p.m.	at No. 5 Villanova	Villanova Stadium; Villanova, PA	FloSports	L 13–14	4,219
September 21	2:00 p.m.	at No. 2 North Dakota State*	Fargodome; Fargo, ND	ESPN+	L 24–41	17,185
October 5	6:00 p.m.	No. 12 William & Mary	Johnny Unitas Stadium; Towson, MD	FloSports	W 34–27	6,165
October 12	2:00 p.m.	at Norfolk State*	William "Dick" Price Stadium; Norfolk, VA	ESPN+	W 28–23	5,003
October 19	1:00 p.m.	Stony Brook^{†}	Johnny Unitas Stadium; Towson, MD	FloSports	L 24–52	3,916
October 26	1:00 p.m.	at Monmouth	Kessler Field; West Long Branch, NJ	FloSports	W 26–14	2,372
November 2	2:00 p.m.	at No. 16 Richmond	E. Claiborne Robins Stadium; Richmond, VA	FloSports	L 24–35	5,778
November 9	1:00 p.m.	Hampton	Johnny Unitas Stadium; Towson, MD	FloSports	W 27–10	4,004
November 16	1:00 p.m.	North Carolina A&T	Johnny Unitas Stadium; Towson, MD	FloSports	W 31–13	3,960
November 23	2:00 p.m.	at Campbell	Barker-Lane Stadium; Buies Creek, NC	FloSports	W 45–23	3,410
*Non-conference game; ^{†}Homecoming; Rankings from STATS Poll released prior to the game; All times are in Eastern time

== Game summaries ==
=== at Cincinnati (FBS) ===
Game One – Towson Tigers (0–0) vs Cincinnati Bearcats (FBS) (0–0) – Game summary

Quarter	1	2	3	4	Total
Tigers	3	14	3	0	20
Bearcats (FBS)	21	7	10	0	38

at Nippert Stadium • Cincinnati, OH

- Date: Saturday August 31, 2024
- Game time: 2:30 p.m.
- Game weather: Sunny, 86 °F (30 °C)
- Game attendance: 37,654
- Referee: Tutashinda Salaam
- TV announcers (ESPN+): Eric Rothman (play-by-play) and Je'Rod Cherry (analyst)

Game information

First quarter

- (11:17) CIN – Brendan Sorsby 2-yard run, Carter Brown kick (Drive: 7 plays, 75 yards, 3:43; Cincinnati 7–0)
- (8:03) TOW – Keegan Vaughan 32-yard field goal (Drive: 4 plays, 5 yards, 1:44; Cincinnati 7–3)
- (6:50) CIN – Xzavier Henderson 42-yard pass from Brendan Sorsby, Carter Brown kick (Drive: 4 plays, 65 yards, 1:08; Cincinnati 14–3)
- (3:13) CIN – Sterling Berkhalter 61-yard pass from Brendan Sorsby, Carter Brown kick (Drive: 3 plays, 75 yards, 1:03; Cincinnati 21–3)

Second quarter

- (9:54) TOW – Jaceon Doss 76-yard pass from Carlos Davis, Keegan Vaughan kick (Drive: 4 plays, 96 yards, 0:59; Cincinnati 21–10)
- (6:56) CIN – Brendan Sorsby 12-yard run, Carter Brown kick (Drive: 5 plays, 63 yards, 2:53; Cincinnati 28–10)
- (0:19) TOW – John Dunmore 28-yard pass from Carlos Davis, Keegan Vaughan kick (Drive: 8 plays, 80 yards, 1:27; Cincinnati 28–17)

Third quarter

- (10:10) TOW – Keegan Vaughan 33-yard field goal (Drive: 12 plays, 59 yards, 4:50; Cincinnati 28–20)
- (9:52) CIN – Evan Pryor 64-yard run, Carter Brown kick (Drive: 1 play, 64 yards, 0:10; Cincinnati 35–20)
- (4:38) CIN – Carter Brown 36-yard field goal (Drive: 11 plays, 63 yards, 3:41; Cincinnati 38–20)

Statistics	TOW	CIN
First downs	21	26
Total yards	438	658
Rushing yards	37–194	32–275
Passing yards	244	383
Passing: Comp–Att–Int	21–37–0	22–31–0
Time of possession	32:03	27:57

Team	Category	Player	Statistics
Towson	Passing	Carlos Davis	21/37, 244 yards, 2 TD
Towson	Rushing	Devin Matthews	17 carries, 74 yards
Towson	Receiving	Jaceon Doss	3 receptions, 87 yards, TD
Cincinnati	Passing	Brendan Sorsby	22/31, 383 yards, 2 TD
Cincinnati	Rushing	Evan Pryor	4 carries, 105 yards, TD
Cincinnati	Receiving	Xzavier Henderson	7 receptions, 101 yards, TD

=== Morgan State (The Battle for Greater Baltimore) ===
Game Two – Morgan State Bears (1–0) at Towson Tigers (0–1) – Game summary

Quarter	1	2	3	4	Total
Bears	0	0	0	0	0
Tigers	0	0	0	0	0

at Johnny Unitas Stadium, Towson, MD

- Date: Saturday September 7, 2024
- Game time: 6:00 p.m.
- TV: FloSports

Game information

First quarter
Second quarter
Third quarter
Fourth quarter

Statistics	MORG	TOW
First downs		
Total yards		
Rushing yards		
Passing yards		
Passing: Comp–Att–Int		
Time of possession		

Team	Category	Player	Statistics
Morgan State	Passing		
Morgan State	Rushing		
Morgan State	Receiving		
Towson	Passing		
Towson	Rushing		
Towson	Receiving		

=== at No. 5 Villanova ===
Game Three – Towson Tigers (1–1) at No. 5 Villanova Wildcats (2–0) – Game summary

Quarter	1	2	3	4	Total
Tigers	0	0	0	0	0
No. 5 Wildcats	0	0	0	0	0

at Villanova Stadium, Villanova, PA

- Date: Saturday September 14, 2024
- Game time: 3:30 p.m.
- TV announcers (FloSports): TBD

Game information

First quarter
Second quarter
Third quarter
Fourth quarter

Statistics	TOW	VILL
First downs		
Total yards		
Rushing yards		
Passing yards		
Passing: Comp–Att–Int		
Time of possession		

Team	Category	Player	Statistics
Towson	Passing		
Towson	Rushing		
Towson	Receiving		
Villanova	Passing		
Villanova	Rushing		
Villanova	Receiving		

=== at No. 2 North Dakota State ===
Game Four – Towson Tigers (1–2) vs No. 2 North Dakota State Bison (2–1) – Game summary

Quarter	1	2	3	4	Total
Tigers	3	0	7	14	24
No. 2 Bison	3	21	7	10	41

at Fargodome, Fargo, North Dakota

- Date: Saturday September 21, 2024
- Game time: 2:00 PM
- Game weather: Indoors; 70 °F (21 °C)
- Game attendance: 17,185
- Referee: Tyler Downs
- TV: ESPN+

Game information

First quarter

- (8:45) NDSU – Griffin Crosa 37-yard field goal (Drive: 10 plays, 57 yards, 6:12; North Dakota State 3–0)
- (5:46) TOW – Keegan Vaughan 40-yard field goal (Drive: 8 plays, 52 yards, 2:59; Tied 3–3)

Second quarter

- (13:57) NDSU – CharMar Brown 1-yard run, Griffin Crosa kick (Drive: 11 plays, 80 yards, 6:45; North Dakota State 10–3)
- (5:26) NDSU – Jackson Williams 67-yard punt return, Griffin Crosa kick (North Dakota State 17–3)
- (0:23) NDSU – Bryce Lance 19-yard pass from Cam Miller, Griffin Crosa kick (Drive: 9 plays, 88 yards, 3:16; North Dakota State 24–3)

Third quarter

- (5:33) TOW – Nathan Kent 2-yard run, Keegan Vaughan kick (Drive: 8 plays, 74 yards, 3:36; North Dakota State 24–10)
- (1:09) NDSU – CharMar Brown 3-yard run, Griffin Crosa kick (Drive: 9 plays, 83 yards, 4:17; North Dakota State 31–10)

Fourth quarter

- (12:00) TOW – Carlos Davis 15-yard run, Keegan Vaughn kick (Drive: 10 plays, 65 yards, 4:09; North Dakota State 31–17)
- (10:05) TOW – Tyrell Greene Jr. 72-yard run, Keegan Vaughn kick (Drive: 1 play, 72 yards, 0:11; North Dakota State 31–24)
- (4:28) NDSU – Griffin Crosa 37-yard field goal (Drive: 9 plays, 40 yards, 5:28; North Dakota State 34–24)
- (1:04) NDSU – CharMar Brown 1-yard run, Griffin Crosa kick (Drive: 7 plays, 20 yards, 1:47; North Dakota State 41–24)

Statistics	TOW	NDSU
First downs	16	26
Total yards	366	407
Rushing yards	204	188
Passing yards	161	219
Passing: Comp–Att–Int	16–27–1	17–20–0
Time of possession	20:07	39:53

Team	Category	Player	Statistics
Towson	Passing	Carlos Davis	14/24, 135 yards, INT
Towson	Rushing	Tyrell Greene Jr.	5 carries, 94 yards, TD
Towson	Receiving	Carter Runyon	6 receptions, 59 yards
North Dakota State	Passing	Cam Miller	17/19, 219 yards, TD
North Dakota State	Rushing	CharMar Brown	24 carries, 126 yards, 3 TD
North Dakota State	Receiving	Bryce Lance	5 receptions, 63 yards, TD

=== No. 12 William & Mary ===
Game Five – No. 12 William & Mary Tribe (4–1) at Towson Tigers (1–3) – Game summary

Quarter	1	2	3	4	Total
No. 12 Tribe	0	13	0	14	27
Tigers	10	3	21	0	34

at Johnny Unitas Stadium, Towson, MD

- Date: Saturday October 5, 2024
- Game time: 6:00 p.m.
- TV: FloSports

Game information

First quarter
Second quarter
Third quarter
Fourth quarter

Statistics	W&M	TOW
First downs		
Total yards		
Rushing yards		
Passing yards		
Passing: Comp–Att–Int		
Time of possession		

Team	Category	Player	Statistics
William & Mary	Passing		
William & Mary	Rushing		
William & Mary	Receiving		
Towson	Passing		
Towson	Rushing		
Towson	Receiving		

=== at Norfolk State ===
Game Six – Towson Tigers (2–3) vs Norfolk State Spartans (2–5) – Game summary

Quarter	1	2	3	4	Total
Tigers	0	0	0	0	0
Spartans	0	0	0	0	0

at William "Dick" Price Stadium, Norfolk, Virginia

- Date: Saturday October 12, 2024
- Game time: 2:00 PM
- TV: ESPN+

Game information

First quarter
Second quarter
Third quarter
Fourth quarter

Statistics	TOW	NORF
First downs		
Total yards		
Rushing yards		
Passing yards		
Passing: Comp–Att–Int		
Time of possession		

Team	Category	Player	Statistics
Towson	Passing		
Towson	Rushing		
Towson	Receiving		
Norfolk State	Passing		
Norfolk State	Rushing		
Norfolk State	Receiving		

=== Stony Brook ===
Game Seven – Stony Brook Seawolves (4–2) vs Towson Tigers (3–3) – Game summary

Quarter	1	2	3	4	Total
Seawolves	14	14	10	14	52
Tigers	7	10	0	7	24

at Johnny Unitas Stadium, Towson, MD

- Date: Saturday October 19, 2024
- Game time: 1:00 PM EST
- Game weather: Sunny
- Game attendance: 3,916
- Referee: Bill McKeevar
- TV announcers (FloSports): Spiro Morekas (play-by-play) and Gordy Combs (analyst)

Game information

First quarter

- (14:49) TOW – Devin Matthews 75-yard run, Keegan Vaughan kick (Drive: 1 play, 75 yards, 0:11; Stony Brook 7–0)
- (6:32) SBU – Jasiah Williams 10-yard pass from Tyler Knoop, Enda Kirby kick (Drive: 7 plays, 93 yards, 3:35; Tied 7–7)
- (3:12) SBU – Jasiah Williams 19-yard pass from Tyler Knoop, Enda Kirby kick (Drive: 4 plays, 54 yards, 1:51; Stony Brook 14–7)

Second quarter

- (14:09) TOW – Keegan Vaughan 30-yard field goal (Drive: 13 plays, 62 yards, 4:03; Stony Brook 14–10)
- (11:46) TOW – Tyrell Greene Jr. 1-yard run, Keegan Vaughan kick (Drive: 1 play, 1 yard, 0:04; Towson 17–14)
- (4:24) SBU – Cal Redman 7-yard pass from Tyler Knoop, Enda Kirby kick (Drive: 7 plays, 55 yards, 2:09; Stony Brook 21–17)
- (0:40) SBU – Jayce Freeman 21-yard pass from Tyler Knoop, Enda Kirby kick (Drive: 9 plays, 98 yards, 1:37; Stony Brook 28–17)

Third quarter

- (11:35) SBU – Jayce Freeman 22-yard pass from Tyler Knoop, Enda Kirby kick (Drive: 7 plays, 75 yards, 3:25; Stony Brook 35–17)
- (0:08) SBU – Enda Kirby 29-yard field goal (Drive: 16 plays, 84 yards, 9:17; Stony Brook 38–17)

Fourth quarter

- (12:57) SBU – Jasiah Williams 20-yard pass from Tyler Knoop, Enda Kirby kick (Drive: 1 play, 20 yards, 0:06; Stony Brook 45–17)
- (3:03) SBU – Johnny Martin 5-yard run, Enda Kirby kick (Drive: 12 plays, 55 yards, 8:24; Stony Brook 52–17)
- (0:14) TOW – Ike Daniels 35-yard run, Keegan Vaughan kick (Drive: 7 plays, 75 yards, 2:49; Stony Brook 52–24)

Statistics	STBK	TOW
First downs	30	15
Total yards	512	405
Rushing yards	125	247
Passing yards	387	158
Passing: Comp–Att–Int	34–40–0	12–20–1
Time of possession	37:04	22:56

Team	Category	Player	Statistics
Stony Brook	Passing	Tyler Knoop	34/40, 387 yards, 6 TD
Stony Brook	Rushing	Roland Dempster	16 carries, 103 yards
Stony Brook	Receiving	Jasiah Williams	9 receptions, 92 yards, 3 TD
Towson	Passing	Sean Brown	12/20, 158 yards, INT
Towson	Rushing	Tyrell Greene Jr.	16 carries, 115 yards, TD
Towson	Receiving	John Dunmore	3 receptions, 60 yards

=== at Monmouth ===
Game Eight – Towson Tigers (3–4) at Monmouth Hawks (4–3) – Game summary

Quarter	1	2	3	4	Total
Tigers	0	10	10	6	26
Hawks	0	7	7	0	14

at Kessler Field • West Long Branch, NJ

- Date: Saturday October 26, 2024
- Game time: 1:00 PM EST
- Game weather: Sunny, 66 °F (19 °C) Wind: SE @ 12 mph
- Game attendance: 2,372
- Referee: Tom Zetts
- TV announcers (FloSports): Eddy Occhipinti (play-by-play) and Emory Hunt (analyst)

Game information

First quarter

No scoring plays

Second quarter

- (13:20) TOW – Tyrell Greene Jr. 10-yard run (Keegan Vaughan kick) (Drive: 7 plays, 40 yards, 3:03; Towson 7-0)
- (8:54) MONM – Sone Ntoh 1-yard run (Michael Calton Jr. kick) (Drive: 9 plays, 69 yards, 4:20; 7-7)
- (1:40) TOW – Keegan Vaughan 23-yard field goal (Drive: 9 plays, 30 yards, 3:18; Towson 10-7)

Third quarter

- (10:50) TOW – Carter Runyon 3-yard pass from Sean Brown (Keegan Vaughan kick) (Drive: 9 plays, 70 yards, 4:10; Towson 17-7)
- (03:56) MONM – Gavin Nelson 33-yard pass from Derek Robertson (Michael Calton Jr. kick) (Drive: 13 plays, 86 yards, 6:48; Monmouth 17-14)
- (0:07) TOW – Keegan Vaughan 22-yard field goal (Drive: 8 plays, 63 yards, 3:44; Towson 20-14)

Fourth quarter

- (08:35) TOW – Carter Runyon 6-yard pass from Sean Brown (Two-point pass conversion failed) (Drive: 10 plays, 54 yards, 4:02; Towson 26-14)

Statistics	TOW	MONM
First downs	22	21
Total yards	357	361
Rushing yards	114	56
Passing yards	243	305
Passing: Comp–Att–Int	27–36–0	28–46–1
Time of possession	30:48	29:12

Team	Category	Player	Statistics
Towson	Passing	Sean Brown	27/36, 243 yards, 2 TD
Towson	Rushing	Devin Matthews	15 carries, 75 yards
Towson	Receiving	Jaceon Doss	8 receptions, 65 yards
Monmouth	Passing	Derek Robertson	28/46, 305 yards, TD, INT
Monmouth	Rushing	Rodney Nelson	9 carries, 37 yards
Monmouth	Receiving	Gavin Nelson	9 receptions, 133 yards, TD

=== at No. 16 Richmond ===
Game Nine – Towson Tigers (4–4) at No. 16 Richmond Spiders (6–2) – Game summary

Quarter	1	2	3	4	Total
Tigers	0	10	7	7	24
No. 16 Spiders	9	10	3	13	35

at E. Claiborne Robins Stadium • Richmond, VA

- Date: Saturday November 2, 2024
- Game time: 2:00 p.m.
- Game weather: Sunny • Temperature: 66 °F (19 °C) • Wind: N 6 mph
- Game attendance: 5,778
- TV: FloSports/MASN

Game information

First quarter
Second quarter
Third quarter
Fourth quarter

Statistics	TOW	RICH
First downs	20	19
Total yards	383	347
Rushing yards	108	117
Passing yards	275	230
Passing: Comp–Att–Int	18–30–1	17–26–0
Time of possession	22:46	37:14

Team	Category	Player	Statistics
Towson	Passing	Sean Brown	18–30, 275 yards, TD
Towson	Rushing	Devin Matthews	11 carries, 78 yards, TD
Towson	Receiving	John Dunmore	6 receptions, 123 yards, TD
Richmond	Passing	Camden Coleman	17–26, 230 yards, 2 TD
Richmond	Rushing	Zach Palmer-Smith	28 carries, 98 yards
Richmond	Receiving	Jerry Garcia Jr.	4 receptions, 110 yards

=== Hampton ===
Game Ten – Hampton Pirates (5–4) vs Towson Tigers (4–5) – Game summary

Quarter	1	2	3	4	Total
Pirates	0	0	0	0	0
Tigers	0	0	0	0	0

at Johnny Unitas Stadium, Towson, MD

- Date: Saturday November 9, 2024
- Game time: 1:00 PM
- TV: FloSports

Game information

First quarter
Second quarter
Third quarter
Fourth quarter

Statistics	HAMP	TOW
First downs		
Total yards		
Rushing yards		
Passing yards		
Passing: Comp–Att–Int		
Time of possession		

Team	Category	Player	Statistics
Hampton	Passing		
Hampton	Rushing		
Hampton	Receiving		
Towson	Passing		
Towson	Rushing		
Towson	Receiving		

=== North Carolina A&T ===
Game Eleven – North Carolina A&T Aggies (0–0) vs Towson Tigers (0–0) – Game summary

Quarter	1	2	3	4	Total
Aggies	0	0	0	0	0
Tigers	0	0	0	0	0

at Johnny Unitas Stadium, Towson, MD

- Date: Saturday November 16, 2024
- Game time: 1:00 PM
- TV: FloSports

Game information

First quarter
Second quarter
Third quarter
Fourth quarter

Statistics	NCAT	TOW
First downs		
Total yards		
Rushing yards		
Passing yards		
Passing: Comp–Att–Int		
Time of possession		

Team	Category	Player	Statistics
North Carolina A&T	Passing		
North Carolina A&T	Rushing		
North Carolina A&T	Receiving		
Towson	Passing		
Towson	Rushing		
Towson	Receiving		

=== at Campbell ===
Game Twelve – Towson Tigers (0–0) at Campbell Fighting Camels (0–0) – Game summary

Quarter	1	2	3	4	Total
Tigers	0	0	0	0	0
Fighting Camels	0	0	0	0	0

at Barker–Lane Stadium • Buies Creek, NC

- Date: Saturday November 23, 2024
- Game time: 2:00 p.m.
- TV: FloSports

Game information

First quarter
Second quarter
Third quarter
Fourth quarter

Statistics	TOW	CAM
First downs		
Total yards		
Rushing yards		
Passing yards		
Passing: Comp–Att–Int		
Time of possession		

Team	Category	Player	Statistics
Towson	Passing		
Towson	Rushing		
Towson	Receiving		
Campbell	Passing		
Campbell	Rushing		
Campbell	Receiving		
