= 2024 Howard Bison football team =

American college football season

2024 Howard Bison football
- Conference: Mid-Eastern Athletic Conference
- Record: 4–8 (1–4 MEAC)
- Head coach: Larry Scott (5th season)
- Co-offensive coordinators: Greg McGhee (1st season); Da'Vaun Johnson (1st season)
- Defensive coordinator: Troy Douglas (5th season)
- Home stadium: William H. Greene Stadium

2024 Mid-Eastern Athletic Conference football standings
	Conf.			Overall
Team	W		L	W		L
No. 24 South Carolina State $	5	–	0	9	–	3
North Carolina Central	4	–	1	8	–	3
Morgan State	3	–	2	6	–	6
Norfolk State	2	–	3	4	–	8
Howard	1	–	4	4	–	8
Delaware State	0	–	5	1	–	11
$ – Conference champion; Rankings from STATS Poll

The 2024 Howard Bison football team represented Howard University as a member of the Mid-Eastern Athletic Conference (MEAC) during the 2024 NCAA Division I FCS football season. The Bison were led by fifth-year head coach Larry Scott, and played home games at William H. Greene Stadium in Washington, D.C.

== Schedule ==
Date	Time	Opponent	Site	TV	Result	Attendance
August 29	6:00 p.m.	at Rutgers*	SHI Stadium; Piscataway, NJ	BTN	L 7–44	47,803
September 7	7:00 p.m.	Mercyhurst*	William H. Greene Stadium; Washington, DC	ESPN+	W 32–31	6,568
September 14	3:00 p.m.	vs. Morehouse*	MetLife Stadium; East Rutherford, NJ (HBCU NYC Football Classic)	CNBC	W 35–21	31,174
September 21	3:30 p.m.	vs. Hampton*	Audi Field; Washington, DC (The Real HU / Truth and Service Classic)	ESPN+	L 20–27	16,813
September 28	3:00 p.m.	at Princeton*	Princeton Stadium; Princeton, NJ	ESPN+	L 13-30	7,886
October 12	1:00 p.m.	Sacred Heart*	William H. Greene Stadium; Washington, DC	ESPN+	W 21–14	3,861
October 19	3:30 p.m.	Tennessee State*^{†}	William H. Greene Stadium; Washington, DC	ESPN+	L 14–27	9,995
October 26	2:00 p.m.	at Norfolk State	William "Dick" Price Stadium; Norfolk, VA	ESPN network	L 20–21	31,876
November 2	1:00 p.m.	Delaware State	William H. Greene Stadium; Washington, DC	ESPN+	W 38–0	3,309
November 9	3:30 p.m.	South Carolina State	William H. Greene Stadium; Washington, DC	ESPN+	L 14–38	3,891
November 15	8:00 p.m.	at North Carolina Central	O'Kelly-Riddick Stadium; Durham, NC	ESPNU	L 3–26	5,429
November 23	1:00 p.m.	at Morgan State	Hughes Stadium; Baltimore, MD (rivalry)	ESPN+	L 21–35	973
*Non-conference game; ^{†}Homecoming; All times are in Eastern time

== Game summaries ==
=== at Rutgers (FBS) ===
Game One – Howard Bison (0-0) at Rutgers Scarlet Knights (FBS) (0-0) – Game summary

Quarter	1	2	3	4	Total
Bison	0	7	0	0	7
Scarlet Knights (FBS)	7	10	14	13	44

at SHI Stadium, Piscataway, NJ

- Date: Thursday August 29, 2024
- Game time: 6:00 PM
- Game weather: 73 °F (23 °C), cloudy
- Game attendance: 47,803
- Referee: David Siegle
- TV announcers (BTN): Jason Horowitz (play-by-play), Matt Millen (analyst), and Taryn Hatcher (sideline)
- HUBison.com box score

Game information

First quarter

- (8:53) RUTG – Eric Rogers 52-yard interception return (Jai Patel kick) (Rutgers 7-0)

Second quarter

- (4:51) RUTG – Dymere Miller 2-yard pass from Athan Kaliakmanis (Jai Patel kick) (Drive: 7 plays, 55 yards, 3:55; Rutgers 14-0)
- (0:40) HOW – Eden James 2-yard run (Dylan West kick) (Drive: 10 plays, 76 yards, 4:05; Rutgers 14-7)
- (0:04) RUTG – Jai Patel 36-yard field goal (Drive: 5 plays, 61 yards, 0:34; Rutgers 17-7)

Third quarter

- (8:06) RUTG – Kyle Monangai 7-yard run (Jai Patel kick) (Drive: 8 plays, 59 yards, 3:45; Rutgers 24-7)
- (2:33) RUTG – Samuel Brown V 34-yard pass from Athan Kaliakmanis (Jai Patel kick) (Drive: 10 plays, 58 yards, 4:34; Rutgers 31-7)

Fourth quarter

- (4:16) RUTG – Kenny Fletcher 3-yard pass from Athan Kaliakmanis (Jai Patel kick) (Drive: 13 plays, 87 yards, 8:16; Rutgers 38-7)
- (0:00) RUTG – Antwan Raymond 11-yard run (Drive: 2 plays, 31 yards, 0:15; Rutgers 44-7)

Statistics	HOW	RUTG
First downs	14	29
Total yards	60–262	70–476
Rushing yards	35–146	46–329
Passing yards	116	147
Passing: Comp–Att–Int	14–25–1	15–24–1
Time of possession	26:46	33:14

Team	Category	Player	Statistics
Howard	Passing	Jashawn Scroggins	14/25, 116 yards, INT
Howard	Rushing	Jashawn Scroggins	12 carries, 67 yards
Howard	Receiving	Isiah Williams	3 receptions, 39 yards
Rutgers	Passing	Athan Kaliakmanis	15/24, 147 yards, 3 TD
Rutgers	Rushing	Kyle Monangai	19 carries, 165 yards, TD
Rutgers	Receiving	Dymere Miller	4 receptions, 37 yards, TD

=== Mercyhurst ===
Game Two – Mercyhurst Lakers (1-0) at Howard Bison (0-1) – Game summary

Quarter	1	2	3	4	Total
Lakers	3	0	7	21	31
Bison	0	14	7	11	32

at Greene Stadium, Washington, DC

- Date: Saturday September 7, 2024
- Game time: 7:00 PM
- Game weather: Sunny • Temperature: 70 °F (21 °C) • Wind: NW at 9 miles per hour (14 km/h)
- Game attendance: 6,568
- Referee: Carlos Torian
- TV announcers (ESPN+): Trevin A. Jones (play-by-play) and Nate Henry (color analyst)

Game information

First quarter

- (5:44) MER – Nathan Nagucki 21-yard field goal (Drive: 14 plays, 94 yards, 5:48; Mercyhurst 3–0)

Second quarter

- (7:25) HOW – Jarrett Hunter 11-yard run, Dylan West kick (Drive: 11 plays, 73 yards, 6:32; Howard 7–3)
- (1:07) HOW – Jarrett Hunter 7-yard run, Dylan West kick (Drive: 9 plays, 56 yards, 2:42; Howard 14–3)

Third quarter

- (8:51) HOW – Nathanial Clark 11-yard pass from Ja'Shawn Scroggins, Dylan West kick (Drive: 9 plays, 64 yards, 4:28; Howard 21–3)
- (4:18) MER – Ayron Rodriguez 2-yard run, Nathan Nagucki kick (Drive: 11 plays, 73 yards, 4:33; Howard 21–10)

Fourth quarter

- (14:59) MER – Rylan Davison 8-yard pass from Adam Urena, Rylan Davison pass (Drive: 5 plays, 72 yards, 0:01; Howard 21–18)
- (9:48) HOW – Jarrett Hunter 1-yard run (Drive: 6 plays, 26 yards, 2:38; Howard 27–18)
- (5:12) MER – Cameron Barmore 13-yard pass from Adam Urena, Nathan Nagucki kick (Drive: 8 plays, 71 yards, 4:31; Howard 27–25)
- (0:41) MER – Cameron Barmore 22-yard pass from Adam Urena (Drive: 8 plays, 61 yards, 2:34; Mercyhurst 31–27)
- (0:41) HOW – Kenny Gallop Jr. 0-yard PAT return (Mercyhurst 31–29)
- (0:00) HOW – Dylan West 37-yard field goal (Drive: 5 plays, 55 yards, 0:41; Howard 32–31)

Statistics	MERC	HOW
First downs	24	25
Total yards	334	432
Rushing yards	27–109	49–275
Passing yards	225	157
Passing: Comp–Att–Int	23–34–0	12–22–0
Time of possession	24:55	32:12

Team	Category	Player	Statistics
Mercyhurst	Passing	Adam Urena	23/34, 225 yards, 2 TD
Mercyhurst	Rushing	Brian Trobel	4 carries, 64 yards
Mercyhurst	Receiving	Chaz Davis	3 receptions, 55 yards
Howard	Passing	Jashawn Scroggins	12/22, 157 yards, TD
Howard	Rushing	Jarret Hunter	27 carries, 126 yards, 3 TD
Howard	Receiving	Isiah Williams	2 receptions, 44 yards

=== vs. Morehouse (DII) ===
Game Three – Morehouse Maroon Tigers (DII) (0–2) at Howard Bison (1–1) – Game summary

Quarter	1	2	3	4	Total
Maroon Tigers (DII)	0	7	0	14	21
Bison	14	7	7	7	35

at MetLife Stadium • East Rutherford, NJ

- Date: Saturday September 14, 2024
- Game time: 3:00 p.m.
- Game weather: Sunny • Temperature: 84 °F (29 °C) • Wind: NE 8 Mph
- Game attendance: 31,174
- TV: CNBC

Game information

First quarter

- (9:43) HOW – Kasey Hawthorne 3-yard run, Dylan West kick (Drive: 11 plays, 53 yards, 5:08; Howard 7-0)
- (5:49) HOW – Se'Quan Osborne 12-yard pass from Jaylon Tolbert, Dylan West kick (Drive: 7 plays, 61 yards, 2:23; Howard 14-0)

Second quarter

- (7:26) MOR – Ajani Williams 16-yard pass from Miles Scott, Khasen Kirkland kick (Drive: 7 plays, 58 yards, 3:46; Howard 14-7)
- (4:12) HOW – Ke'Untae Mosley 33-yard pass from Jaylon Tolbert, Dylan West kick (Drive: 6 plays, 68 yards, 3:14; Howard 21-7)

Third quarter

- (9:11) HOW – Richie Ilarraza 20-yard pass from Jaylon Tolbert, Dylan West kick (Drive: 3 plays, 44 yards, 0:35; Howard 28-7)

Fourth quarter

- (13:22) HOW – Isiah Williams 20-yard pass from Jaylon Tolbert, Dylan West kick (Drive: 12 plays, 98 yards, 5:09; Howard 35-7)
- (8:33) MOR – Ajani Williams 21-yard pass from Miles Scott, Khasen Kirkland kick (Drive: 4 plays, 55 yards, 1:55; Howard 35-14)
- (1:54) MOR – Kamrin Brunson 27-yard pass from Miles Scott, Khasen Kirkland kick (Drive: 6 plays, 63 yards, 2:00; Howard 35-21)

Statistics	MOR	HOW
First downs	11	23
Total yards	173	406
Rushing yards	-36	139
Passing yards	209	267
Passing: Comp–Att–Int	17–31–0	23–42–1
Time of possession	26:21	33:39

Team	Category	Player	Statistics
Morehouse	Passing	Miles Scott	17/31, 209 yards, 3 TD
Morehouse	Rushing	Miles Scott	11 carries, -39 yards
Morehouse	Receiving	Ajani Williams	5 receptions, 72 yards, 2 TD
Howard	Passing	Jaylon Tolbert	23/41, 267 yards, 4 TD, INT
Howard	Rushing	Jarett Hunter	17 carries, 94 yards
Howard	Receiving	Richie Ilarraza	7 receptions, 77 yards, TD

=== vs. Hampton (The Real HU) ===
Game Four – Hampton Pirates (2–1) at Howard Bison (2–1) – Game summary

Quarter	1	2	3	4	Total
Pirates	0	0	0	0	0
Bison	0	0	0	0	0

at Audi Field • Washington, D.C.

- Date: Saturday September 21, 2024
- Game time: 3:30 p.m.
- Game weather: 0 °F (−18 °C)
- TV: ESPN+

Game information

First quarter
Second quarter
Third quarter
Fourth quarter

Statistics	HAMP	HOW
First downs		
Total yards		
Rushing yards		
Passing yards		
Passing: Comp–Att–Int		
Time of possession		

Team	Category	Player	Statistics
Hampton	Passing		
Hampton	Rushing		
Hampton	Receiving		
Howard	Passing		
Howard	Rushing		
Howard	Receiving		

=== at Princeton ===
Game Five – Howard Bison (2–2) at Princeton Tigers (0–1) – Game summary

Quarter	1	2	3	4	Total
Bison	0	0	7	6	13
Tigers	10	10	3	7	30

at Princeton Stadium • Princeton, NJ

- Date: Saturday September 28, 2024
- Game time: 3:02 p.m.
- Game weather: 70 °F (21 °C) NE 10MPH Wind, Sunny
- Game attendance: 7,886
- TV: ESPN+

Game information

First quarter

1st 13:14 PRINCE - Colella, Luke 37 yd pass from McAllister, Blaine (Massick, Sam kick) 5 plays, 69 yards, TOP 01:39, HOW 0, PRINCE 7.

1st 07:09 PRINCE - Massick, Sam 27 yd field goal 4 plays, 5 yards, TOP 01:26, HOW 0, PRINCE 10.

Second quarter

2nd 07:39 PRINCE - McAllister, Blaine 7 yd run (Massick, Sam kick), 3 plays, 5 yards, TOP 01:34, HOW 0, PRINCE 17.

2nd 00:16 PRINCE - Sexton, Jeffrey 41 yd field goal 14 plays, 65 yards, TOP 03:21, HOW 0, PRINCE 20.

Third quarter

3rd 09:43 PRINCE - Sexton, Jeffrey 44 yd field goal 8 plays, 22 yards, TOP 03:08, HOW 0, PRINCE 23.

3rd 03:21 HOW - Hawthorne, Kasey 2 yd run (West, Dylan kick), 13 plays, 82 yards, TOP 06:12, HOW 7, PRINCE 23.

Fourth quarter

4th 08:34 HOW - Tolbert, Jaylon 1 yd run ( ), 12 plays, 85 yards, TOP 04:51, HOW 13, PRINCE 23.

4th 04:57 PRINCE - Murphy, Dareion 22 yd run (Massick, Sam kick), 7 plays, 75 yards, TOP 03:37, HOW 13, PRINCE 30.

FINAL HOWARD 13, PRINCETON 30.

Statistics	PRI	HOW
First downs	18	18
Total yards	275	226
Rushing yards	195	92
Passing yards	134	80
Passing: Comp–Att–Int	5–19–0	17–29–1
Time of possession	28:19	31:41

Team	Category	Player	Statistics
Princeton	Passing	Blaine McAllister	5/19, 80 YDS, 1TD
Princeton	Rushing	John Volker	12 RUS, 88 YDS
Princeton	Receiving	Luke Colella	1 REC, 37 YDS, 1TD
Howard	Passing	Jaylon Tolbert	17/29, 134YDS, 1INT
Howard	Rushing	Eden James	17 RUS, 73 YDS
Howard	Receiving	Se'Quan Osborne	3 REC, 42 YDS

=== Sacred Heart ===
Game Six – Sacred Heart Pioneers (3–3) at Howard Bison (2–3) – Game summary

Quarter	1	2	3	4	Total
Crusaders	0	14	0	0	14
Bison	0	7	7	7	21

at William H. Greene Stadium • Washington, D.C.

- Date: Saturday October 12, 2024
- Game time: 1:00 p.m.
- Game weather: Sunny • Temperature: 74 °F (23 °C) • Wind: NW at 8 miles per hour (13 km/h)
- Game attendance: 3,861
- Referee: Toby Johnson
- TV announcers (ESPN+): Lynnell Willingham (play-by-play) and Melissa Kim (color analyst)

Game information

First quarter

No scoring plays

Second quarter

- (12:26) SHU – Xavier Leigh 67-yard run, Matt Kling kick (Drive: 2 plays, 82 yards, 0:56; Sacred Heart 7–0)
- (8:03) HOW – Jarrett Hunter 3-yard run, Dylan West kick (Drive: 10 plays, 68 yards, 4:14; Tied 7–7)
- (0:34) SHU – Jalen Madison 2-yard run, Matt Kling kick (Drive: 14 plays, 63 yards, 7:20; Sacred Heart 14–7)

Third quarter

- (14:11) HOW – Kasey Hawthorne 5-yard run, Dylan West kick (Drive: 1 play, 5 yards, 0:03; Tied 14–14)

Fourth quarter

- (6:04) HOW – Ja'Shawn Scroggins 5-yard run, Dylan West kick (Drive: 8 plays, 45 yards, 4:07; Howard 21–14)

Statistics	SHU	HOW
First downs	13	18
Total yards	268	339
Rushing yards	169	186
Passing yards	99	153
Passing: Comp–Att–Int	11–19–0	17–29–1
Time of possession	30:20	29:40

Team	Category	Player	Statistics
Sacred Heart	Passing	John Michalski	7/13, 82 yards
Sacred Heart	Rushing	Xavier Leigh	5 carries, 76 yards, TD
Sacred Heart	Receiving	Elijah Ford	3 receptions, 47 yards
Howard	Passing	Ja'Shawn Scroggins	17/29, 153 yards, INT
Howard	Rushing	Ja'Shawn Scroggins	12 carries, 85 yards, TD
Howard	Receiving	Kasey Hawthorne	5 receptions, 53 yards

=== Tennessee State ===
Game Seven – Tennessee State Tigers (5–2) at Howard Bison (3–3) – Game summary

Quarter	1	2	3	4	Total
Tigers	7	6	14	0	27
Bison	0	7	7	0	14

at William H. Greene Stadium • Washington, D.C.

- Date: Saturday October 19, 2024
- Game time: 2:30 p.m.
- Game weather: Sunny, 73 °F (23 °C)
- Game attendance: 9,995
- Referee: Jason Soistman
- TV announcers (ESPN+): TBD

Game information

First quarter
Second quarter
Third quarter
Fourth quarter

Statistics	TNST	HOW
First downs	16	14
Total yards	412	209
Rushing yards	123	176
Passing yards	289	33
Passing: Comp–Att–Int	19–30–0	6–22–2
Time of possession	35:19	24:41

Team	Category	Player	Statistics
Tennessee State	Passing	Draylen Ellis	19/30, 289 yards
Tennessee State	Rushing	Jaden McGill	14 carries, 43 yards, 1 TD
Tennessee State	Receiving	Karate Brenson	5 receptions, 153 yards
Howard	Passing	Ja'Shawn Scroggins	6/21, 33 yards, 2 INT
Howard	Rushing	Jarett Hunter	15 carries, 102 yards, 1 TD
Howard	Receiving	Breylin Smith	4 receptions, 15 yards

=== at Norfolk State ===
Game Eight – Howard Bison (3–4) vs Norfolk State Spartans (2–6) – Game summary

Quarter	1	2	3	4	Total
Bison	0	0	0	0	0
Spartans	0	0	0	0	0

at William "Dick" Price Stadium, Norfolk, Virginia

- Date: Saturday October 26, 2024
- Game time: 2:00 PM
- TV: ESPN+

Game information

First quarter
Second quarter
Third quarter
Fourth quarter

Statistics	HOW	NORF
First downs		
Total yards		
Rushing yards		
Passing yards		
Passing: Comp–Att–Int		
Time of possession		

Team	Category	Player	Statistics
Howard	Passing		
Howard	Rushing		
Howard	Receiving		
Norfolk State	Passing		
Norfolk State	Rushing		
Norfolk State	Receiving		

=== vs. Delaware State ===
Game Nine – Delaware State Hornets (1–7) vs Howard Bison (3–5) – Game summary

Quarter	1	2	3	4	Total
Hornets	0	0	0	0	0
Bison	0	0	0	0	0

at William H. Greene Stadium, Washington, D.C.

- Date: Saturday November 2, 2024
- Game time: 1:00 p.m.
- TV: ESPN+

Game information

First quarter
Second quarter
Third quarter
Fourth quarter

Statistics	DSU	HOW
First downs		
Total yards		
Rushing yards		
Passing yards		
Passing: Comp–Att–Int		
Time of possession		

Team	Category	Player	Statistics
Delaware State	Passing		
Delaware State	Rushing		
Delaware State	Receiving		
Howard	Passing		
Howard	Rushing		
Howard	Receiving		

=== vs. South Carolina State ===
Game Ten – South Carolina State Bulldogs (6–2) vs Howard Bison (4–5) – Game summary

Quarter	1	2	3	4	Total
Bulldogs	0	0	0	0	0
Bison	0	0	0	0	0

at William H. Greene Stadium • Washington, D.C.

- Date: Saturday November 9, 2024
- Game time: 3:30 p.m.
- Game weather: 0 °F (−18 °C)
- TV announcers (ESPN+): Tiffany Greene (play-by-play) and Jay Walker (analyst)

Game information

First quarter
Second quarter
Third quarter
Fourth quarter

Statistics	SCSU	HOW
First downs		
Total yards		
Rushing yards		
Passing yards		
Passing: Comp–Att–Int		
Time of possession		

Team	Category	Player	Statistics
South Carolina State	Passing		
South Carolina State	Rushing		
South Carolina State	Receiving		
Howard	Passing		
Howard	Rushing		
Howard	Receiving		

=== at North Carolina Central ===
Game Eleven – Howard Bison (4–6) at North Carolina Central Eagles (6–3) – Game summary

Quarter	1	2	3	4	Total
Bison	3	0	0	0	3
Eagles	0	6	7	13	26

at O'Kelly–Riddick Stadium • Durham, NC

- Date: Friday November 15, 2024
- Game time: 8:00 p.m.
- Game weather: Clear • Temperature: 50 °F (10 °C) • Wind: NW 3 miles per hour (4.8 km/h)
- Game attendance: 5,429
- Referee: Derek Hatten
- TV announcers (ESPNU): Tiffany Greene (play-by-play) and Jay Walker (analyst)

Game information

First quarter

- (0:09) HOW – Dylan West 36-yard field goal (Drive: 9 plays, 62 yards, 4:09; Howard 3–0)

Second quarter

- (0:23) NCCU – Chris Mosley 12-yard pass from Walker Harris (Drive: 11 plays, 71 yards, 2:14; North Carolina Central 6–3)

Third quarter

- (7:44) NCCU – J'Mari Taylor 61-yard run, Juan Velarde kick (Drive: 2 plays, 76 yards, 0:46; North Carolina Central 13–3)

Fourth quarter

- (13:33) NCCU – J'Mari Taylor 18-yard run, Juan Velarde kick (Drive: 5 plays, 33 yards, 2:44; North Carolina Central 20–3)
- (6:14) NCCU – J'Mari Taylor 40-yard run (Drive: 4 plays, 79 yards, 2:23; North Carolina Central 26–3)

Statistics	HOW	NCCU
First downs	9	27
Total yards	121	563
Rushing yards	38	242
Passing yards	83	321
Passing: Comp–Att–Int	11–26–0	20–36–2
Time of possession	26:54	32:51

Team	Category	Player	Statistics
Howard	Passing	Ja'Shawn Scroggins	11/26, 83 yards
Howard	Rushing	Jarett Hunter	8 carries, 29 yards
Howard	Receiving	Isiah Williams	3 receptions, 29 yards
North Carolina Central	Passing	Walker Harris	20/35, 321 yards, TD, INT
North Carolina Central	Rushing	J'Mari Taylor	24 carries, 206 yards, 3 TD
North Carolina Central	Receiving	J'Mari Taylor	6 receptions, 78 yards

=== at Morgan State ===
Game Twelve – Howard Bison (4–7) vs Morgan State Bears (5–6) – Game summary

Quarter	1	2	3	4	Total
Bison	0	0	0	0	0
Bears	0	0	0	0	0

at Hughes Stadium • Baltimore, Maryland

- Date: Saturday November 23, 2024
- Game time: 1:00 p.m.
- Game weather: 0 °F (−18 °C)
- TV: ESPN+

Game information

First quarter
Second quarter
Third quarter
Fourth quarter

Statistics	HOW	MORG
First downs		
Total yards		
Rushing yards		
Passing yards		
Passing: Comp–Att–Int		
Time of possession		

Team	Category	Player	Statistics
Howard	Passing		
Howard	Rushing		
Howard	Receiving		
Morgan State	Passing		
Morgan State	Rushing		
Morgan State	Receiving		
