= 2024 Delaware State Hornets football team =

American college football season

2024 Delaware State Hornets football
- Conference: Mid-Eastern Athletic Conference
- Record: 1–11 (0–5 MEAC)
- Head coach: Lee Hull (2nd season)
- Defensive coordinator: Darrell Wilson (2nd season)
- Home stadium: Alumni Stadium

2024 Mid-Eastern Athletic Conference football standings
	Conf.			Overall
Team	W		L	W		L
No. 24 South Carolina State $	5	–	0	9	–	3
North Carolina Central	4	–	1	8	–	3
Morgan State	3	–	2	6	–	6
Norfolk State	2	–	3	4	–	8
Howard	1	–	4	4	–	8
Delaware State	0	–	5	1	–	11
$ – Conference champion; Rankings from STATS Poll

The 2024 Delaware State Hornets football team represented Delaware State University as a member of the Mid-Eastern Athletic Conference (MEAC) during the 2024 NCAA Division I FCS football season. Led by second-year head coach Lee Hull, the Hornets compiled an overall record of 1–11 with a mark of 0–5 in conference play, placing last out of six team in the MEAC. Delaware State played home games at Alumni Stadium in Dover, Delaware.

== Schedule ==
Date	Time	Opponent	Site	TV	Result	Attendance
August 24	11:59 p.m.	at Hawaii*	Clarence T. C. Ching Athletics Complex; Honolulu, HI	SPEC PPV	L 14–35	12,206
August 31	6:00 p.m.	at Sacred Heart*	Campus Field; Fairfield, CT	ESPN+	W 17–15	4,271
September 14	3:00 p.m.	Wagner*	Alumni Stadium; Dover, DE	ESPN+	L 7–30	3,276
September 21	6:00 p.m.	Richmond*	Alumni Stadium; Dover, DE	ESPN+	L 24–38	2,570
September 28	2:00 p.m.	at Campbell*	Barker-Lane Stadium; Buies Creek, NC	FloSports	L 41–44	3,269
October 5	1:00 p.m.	Saint Francis*^{†}	Alumni Stadium; Dover, DE	ESPN+	L 17–28	5,400
October 12	12:00 p.m.	at Robert Morris*	Joe Walton Stadium; Moon Township, PA	NEC Front Row	L 0–26	2,234
October 26	3:30 p.m.	at South Carolina State	Oliver C. Dawson Stadium; Orangeburg, SC	ESPN+	L 35–69	22,169
November 2	1:00 p.m.	at Howard	William H. Greene Stadium; Washington, D.C.	ESPN+	L 0–38	3,309
November 9	12:00 p.m.	Morgan State	Alumni Stadium; Dover, DE	ESPN+	L 28–36	3,107
November 16	2:00 p.m.	at Norfolk State	William "Dick" Price Stadium; Norfolk, VA	ESPN+	L 19–38	3,002
November 23	1:00 p.m.	North Carolina Central	Alumni Stadium; Dover, DE	ESPN+	L 10–52	2,313
*Non-conference game; ^{†}Homecoming; All times are in Eastern time

== Game summaries ==
=== at Hawaii (FBS) ===
Game One – Delaware State Hornets (0–0) vs Hawaii Rainbow Warriors (FBS) (0–0) – Game summary

Quarter	1	2	3	4	Total
Hornets	0	7	7	0	14
Rainbow Warriors (FBS)	14	0	7	14	35

at Clarence T.C. Ching Athletics Complex • Honolulu, HI

- Date: August 24, 2024
- Game time: 6:00 p.m. HST/11:59 p.m. EST/8:59 p.m. PST
- Game weather: 79 °F (26 °C)
- Game attendance: 12,206
- Referee: Cal McNeill
- TV announcers (SPEC PPV): Kanoa Leahey (play-by-play), Rich Miano (analyst) and Jordan Helle (sideline)

Game information

First quarter

- (9:35) HAW – Tamatoa Mokiao-Atimalala 11-yard pass from Brayden Schager (Kansei Matsuzawa kick) (Drive: 4 plays, 61 yards, 1:26; Hawaii 7-0)
- (0:10) HAW – Tylan Hines 44-yard punt return (Kansei Matsuzawa kick) (Hawaii 14-0)

Second quarter

- (0:12) DSU – Marqui Adams 10-yard run (Nathan Wilson kick) (Drive: 9 plays, 77 yards, 1:43; Hawaii 14-7)

Third quarter

- (11:10) DSU – Jaden Sutton 6-yard run (Nathan Wilson kick) (Drive: 8 plays, 75 yards, 3:50; Tied 14-14)
- (7:42) HAW – Brayden Schager 15-yard run (Kansei Matsuzawa kick) (Drive: 8 plays, 67 yards, 3:28; Hawaii 21-14)

Fourth quarter

- (13:40) HAW – Dekel Crowdus 29-yard pass from Brayden Schager (Kansei Matsuzawa kick) (Drive: 5 plays, 45 yards, 2:05; Hawaii 28-14)
- (3:44) HAW – Brayden Schager 1-yard run (Kansei Matsuzawa kick) (Drive: 5 plays, 51 yards, 3:17; Hawaii 35-14)

Statistics	DSU	HAW
First downs	11	19
Total yards	63–260	61–331
Rushing yards	34–104	27–128
Passing yards	156	203
Passing: Comp–Att–Int	17–29–0	17–34–0
Time of possession	33:05	26:55

Team	Category	Player	Statistics
Delaware State	Passing	Marqui Adams	17/28, 156 yards
Delaware State	Rushing	Jaden Sutton	12 carries, 56 yards, TD
Delaware State	Receiving	Ryan Lee	2 receptions, 48 yards
Hawaii	Passing	Brayden Schager	17/34, 203 yards, 2 TD
Hawaii	Rushing	Landon Sims	10 carries, 58 yards
Hawaii	Receiving	Pofele Ashlock	5 receptions, 81 yards

=== at Sacred Heart ===
Game Two – Delaware State Hornets (0–1) vs Sacred Heart Pioneers (0–0) – Game summary

Quarter	1	2	3	4	Total
Hornets	0	7	0	10	17
Pioneers	3	3	3	6	15

at Campus Field, Fairfield, Connecticut

- Date: Saturday August 31, 2024
- Game time: 6:00 PM EST
- Game weather: Cloudy • Temperature: 78 °F (26 °C) • Wind: N 8 mph
- Game attendance: 4,271
- Referee: Travis Barta
- TV announcers (ESPN+): Randy Brochu (play-by-play), Freddie Coleman (analyst) and Morgan Alston (sideline)

Game information

First quarter

- (08:05) SHU - Matt Kling 34-yd field goal (Drive: 12 plays, 58 yards, 06:50; 3-0 Sacred Heart)

Second quarter

- (06:43) DSU - Kristian Tate 41-yd pass from Marqui Adams (Nathan Wilson kick) (Drive: 8 plays, 78 yards, 04:13; 7-3 Delaware State)
- (01:41) SHU - Matt Kling 41-yd field goal (Drive: 11 plays, 54 yards, 04:56; 7-6 Delaware State)

Third quarter

- (05:02) SHU - Matt Kling 30-yd field goal (Drive: 12 plays, 67 yards, 04:37; 9-7 Sacred Heart)

Fourth quarter

- (12:03) DSU - Nathan Wilson 29-yd field goal (Drive: 12 plays, 63 yards, 07:59; 10-9 Delaware State)
- (07:20) DSU - Jaden Sutton 39-yd run (Nathan Wilson kick), (Drive: 5 plays, 69 yards, 02:12; 17-9 Delaware State)
- (01:54) SHU - Xavier Leigh 4-yd run (2-pt no good ), (Drive: 10 plays, 66 yards, 05:21 17-15 Delaware State)

Statistics	DSU	SHU
First downs	15	20
Total yards	55-295	66-341
Rushing yards	33-145	43-237
Passing yards	150	104
Passing: Comp–Att–Int	14-22-0	12-23-2
Time of possession	28:11	31:49

Team	Category	Player	Statistics
Delaware State	Passing	Marqui Adams	14/22, 150 yards, TD
Delaware State	Rushing	Jaden Sutton	13 carries, 86 yards, TD
Delaware State	Receiving	Kristian Tate	2 receptions, 43 yards, TD
Sacred Heart	Passing	John Michalski	12/23, 104 yards, 2 INT
Sacred Heart	Rushing	Xavier Leigh	14 carries, 91 yards, TD
Sacred Heart	Receiving	Ethan Hilliman	9 receptions, 75 yards

=== vs. Wagner ===
Game Three – Wagner Seahawks (1–1) vs Delaware State Hornets (1–1) – Game summary

Quarter	1	2	3	4	Total
Seahawks	10	0	13	7	30
Hornets	7	0	0	0	7

at Alumni Stadium, Dover, Delaware

- Date: Saturday September 14, 2024
- Game time: 3:00 PM
- Game weather: Sunny • Temperature: 80 °F (27 °C) • Wind: E at 12 miles per hour (19 km/h)
- Game attendance: 3,276
- Referee: Derek Hatten
- TV: ESPN+

Game information

First quarter

- (14:40) WAG – Rickey Spruill 60-yard run, Drew Borner kick (Drive: 1 play, 60 yards, 0:20; Wagner 7–0)
- (7:54) WAG – Drew Borner 30-yard field goal (Drive: 11 plays, 40 yards, 4:39; Wagner 10–0)
- (4:09) DSU – Marqui Adams 19-yard run, Nathan Wilson kick (Drive: 6 plays, 78 yards, 3:40; Wagner 10–7)

Second quarter

No scoring plays

Third quarter

- (7:50) WAG – Jaylen Bonelli 38-yard pass from Jake Cady (Drive: 10 plays, 82 yards, 5:45; Wagner 16–7)
- (1:49) WAG – Teree McDonald 7-yard pass from Jake Cady, Drew Borner kick (Drive: 3 plays, 21 yards, 1:08; Wagner 23–7)

Fourth quarter

- (8:10) WAG – Jake Cady 3-yard run, Drew Borner kick (Drive: 2 plays, 19 yards, 0:25; Wagner 30–7)

Statistics	WAG	DSU
First downs	19	18
Total yards	58–377	60–323
Rushing yards	32–175	25–174
Passing yards	202	149
Passing: Comp–Att–Int	18–26–1	16–35–2
Time of possession	29:09	30:51

Team	Category	Player	Statistics
Wagner	Passing	Jake Cady	18/26, 202 yards, TD, INT
Wagner	Rushing	Rickey Spruill	15 carries, 143 yards
Wagner	Receiving	Jaylen Bonelli	7 receptions, 117 yards
Delaware State	Passing	Marqui Adams	16/32, 149 yards, 2 INT
Delaware State	Rushing	Jaden Sutton	8 carries, 92 yards
Delaware State	Receiving	NyGhee Lolley	3 receptions, 49 yards

=== vs. Richmond ===
Game Four – Richmond Spiders (2-1) vs Delaware State Hornets (1-2) – Game summary

Quarter	1	2	3	4	Total
Spiders	0	14	14	10	38
Hornets	7	3	7	7	24

at Alumni Stadium, Dover, Delaware

- Date: Saturday September 21, 2024
- Game time: 6:00 PM
- Game weather: 75 °F (24 °C)
- Game attendance: 2,570
- Referee: Jason Soistman
- TV: ESPN+

Game information

First quarter
Second quarter
Third quarter
Fourth quarter

Statistics	RICH	DSU
First downs	23	18
Total yards	68-529	54-375
Rushing yards	35-217	36-192
Passing yards	312	183
Passing: Comp–Att–Int	18-33-2	13-18-0
Time of possession	26:23	33:37

Team	Category	Player	Statistics
Richmond	Passing	Camden Coleman	18/33, 312 yards, 2 TD, 2 INT
Richmond	Rushing	Zach Palmer-Smith	32 carries, 207 yards, TD
Richmond	Receiving	Landon Ellis	7 receptions, 131 yards, TD
Delaware State	Passing	Marqui Adams	13/18, 183 yards, 2 TD
Delaware State	Rushing	Marqui Adams	14 carries, 114 yards
Delaware State	Receiving	Kyree Benton	2 receptions, 50 yards, TD

=== at Campbell ===
Game Five – Delaware State Hornets (1–3) vs Campbell Fighting Camels (1–3) – Game summary

Quarter	1	2	3	4	Total
Hornets	0	0	0	0	0
Fighting Camels	0	0	0	0	0

at Barker-Lane Stadium, Buies Creek, North Carolina

- Date: Saturday September 28, 2024
- Game time: 2:00 PM
- TV: FloSports

Game information

First quarter
Second quarter
Third quarter
Fourth quarter

Statistics	DSU	CAMP
First downs		
Total yards		
Rushing yards		
Passing yards		
Passing: Comp–Att–Int		
Time of possession		

Team	Category	Player	Statistics
Delaware State	Passing		
Delaware State	Rushing		
Delaware State	Receiving		
Campbell	Passing		
Campbell	Rushing		
Campbell	Receiving		

=== vs. Saint Francis (PA) ===
Game Six – Saint Francis Red Flash (1–3) vs Delaware State Hornets (1–4) – Game summary

Quarter	1	2	3	4	Total
Red Flash	0	0	0	0	0
Hornets	0	0	0	0	0

at Alumni Stadium, Dover, Delaware

- Date: Saturday October 5, 2024
- Game time: 1:00 PM

Game information

First quarter
Second quarter
Third quarter
Fourth quarter

Statistics	SFPA	DSU
First downs		
Total yards		
Rushing yards		
Passing yards		
Passing: Comp–Att–Int		
Time of possession		

Team	Category	Player	Statistics
Saint Francis (PA)	Passing		
Saint Francis (PA)	Rushing		
Saint Francis (PA)	Receiving		
Delaware State	Passing		
Delaware State	Rushing		
Delaware State	Receiving		

=== at Robert Morris ===
Game Seven – Delaware State Hornets (1–5) vs Robert Morris Colonials (2–3) – Game summary

Quarter	1	2	3	4	Total
Hornets	0	0	0	0	0
Colonials	0	0	0	0	0

at Joe Walton Stadium, Moon Township, Pennsylvania

- Date: Saturday October 12, 2024
- Game time: 12:00 PM
- TV: NEC Front Row

Game information

First quarter
Second quarter
Third quarter
Fourth quarter

Statistics	DSU	RMU
First downs		
Total yards		
Rushing yards		
Passing yards		
Passing: Comp–Att–Int		
Time of possession		

Team	Category	Player	Statistics
Delaware State	Passing		
Delaware State	Rushing		
Delaware State	Receiving		
Robert Morris	Passing		
Robert Morris	Rushing		
Robert Morris	Receiving		

=== at South Carolina State ===
Game Eight – Delaware State Hornets (1–6) vs South Carolina State Bulldogs (4–2) – Game summary

Quarter	1	2	3	4	Total
Hornets	0	0	0	0	0
Bulldogs	0	0	0	0	0

at Oliver C. Dawson Stadium, Orangeburg, South Carolina

- Date: Saturday October 26, 2024
- Game time: 3:30 PM
- TV: ESPN+

Game information

First quarter
Second quarter
Third quarter
Fourth quarter

Statistics	DSU	SCST
First downs		
Total yards		
Rushing yards		
Passing yards		
Passing: Comp–Att–Int		
Time of possession		

Team	Category	Player	Statistics
Delaware State	Passing		
Delaware State	Rushing		
Delaware State	Receiving		
South Carolina State	Passing		
South Carolina State	Rushing		
South Carolina State	Receiving		

=== at Howard ===
Game Nine – Delaware State Hornets (1–7) vs Howard Bison (3–5) – Game summary

Quarter	1	2	3	4	Total
Hornets	0	0	0	0	0
Bison	0	0	0	0	0

at William H. Greene Stadium, Washington, D.C.

- Date: Saturday November 2, 2024
- Game time: 1:00 p.m.
- TV: ESPN+

Game information

First quarter
Second quarter
Third quarter
Fourth quarter

Statistics	DSU	HOW
First downs		
Total yards		
Rushing yards		
Passing yards		
Passing: Comp–Att–Int		
Time of possession		

Team	Category	Player	Statistics
Delaware State	Passing		
Delaware State	Rushing		
Delaware State	Receiving		
Howard	Passing		
Howard	Rushing		
Howard	Receiving		

=== vs. Morgan State ===
Game Ten – Morgan State Bears (4–5) vs Delaware State Hornets (1–8) – Game summary

Quarter	1	2	3	4	Total
Bears	0	0	0	0	0
Hornets	0	0	0	0	0

at Alumni Stadium, Dover, Delaware

- Date: Saturday November 9, 2024
- Game time: 12:00 PM
- TV: ESPN+

Game information

First quarter
Second quarter
Third quarter
Fourth quarter

Statistics	MORG	DSU
First downs		
Total yards		
Rushing yards		
Passing yards		
Passing: Comp–Att–Int		
Time of possession		

Team	Category	Player	Statistics
Morgan State	Passing		
Morgan State	Rushing		
Morgan State	Receiving		
Delaware State	Passing		
Delaware State	Rushing		
Delaware State	Receiving		

=== at Norfolk State ===
Game Eleven – Delaware State Hornets (1–9) vs Norfolk State Spartans (3–7) – Game summary

Quarter	1	2	3	4	Total
Hornets	0	0	0	0	0
Spartans	0	0	0	0	0

at William "Dick" Price Stadium, Norfolk, Virginia

- Date: Saturday November 16, 2024
- Game time: 2:00 PM
- TV: ESPN+

Game information

First quarter
Second quarter
Third quarter
Fourth quarter

Statistics	DSU	NORF
First downs		
Total yards		
Rushing yards		
Passing yards		
Passing: Comp–Att–Int		
Time of possession		

Team	Category	Player	Statistics
Delaware State	Passing		
Delaware State	Rushing		
Delaware State	Receiving		
Norfolk State	Passing		
Norfolk State	Rushing		
Norfolk State	Receiving		

=== vs. North Carolina Central ===
Game Twelve – North Carolina Central Eagles (7–3) vs Delaware State Hornets (1–10) – Game summary

Quarter	1	2	3	4	Total
Eagles	0	0	0	0	0
Hornets	0	0	0	0	0

at Alumni Stadium, Dover, Delaware

- Date: Saturday November 23, 2024
- Game time: 1:00 PM
- TV: ESPN+

Game information

First quarter
Second quarter
Third quarter
Fourth quarter

Statistics	NCCU	DSU
First downs		
Total yards		
Rushing yards		
Passing yards		
Passing: Comp–Att–Int		
Time of possession		

Team	Category	Player	Statistics
North Carolina Central	Passing		
North Carolina Central	Rushing		
North Carolina Central	Receiving		
Delaware State	Passing		
Delaware State	Rushing		
Delaware State	Receiving		
