= 2024 North Carolina Central Eagles football team =

American college football season

2024 North Carolina Central Eagles football
- Conference: Mid-Eastern Athletic Conference

Ranking
- FCS Coaches: No. 23
- Record: 8–3 (4–1 MEAC)
- Head coach: Trei Oliver (5th season)
- Offensive coordinator: Matt Leone (4th season)
- Defensive coordinator: Courtney Coard (3rd season)
- Home stadium: O'Kelly–Riddick Stadium

2024 Mid-Eastern Athletic Conference football standings
	Conf.			Overall
Team	W		L	W		L
No. 24 South Carolina State $	5	–	0	9	–	3
North Carolina Central	4	–	1	8	–	3
Morgan State	3	–	2	6	–	6
Norfolk State	2	–	3	4	–	8
Howard	1	–	4	4	–	8
Delaware State	0	–	5	1	–	11
$ – Conference champion; Rankings from STATS Poll

The 2024 North Carolina Central Eagles football team represented North Carolina Central University as a member of the Mid-Eastern Athletic Conference (MEAC) during the 2024 NCAA Division I FCS football season. The Eagles were led by fifth-year head coach Trei Oliver, and played home games at O'Kelly-Riddick Stadium in Durham, North Carolina.

== Schedule ==
Date	Time	Opponent	Rank	Site	TV	Result	Attendance
September 1	3:00 p.m.	vs. Alabama State*		Hard Rock Stadium; Miami Gardens, FL (Orange Blossom Classic)	ESPN	W 31–24	10,256
September 7	6:00 p.m.	Elon*		O'Kelly–Riddick Stadium; Durham, NC	ESPN+	L 19–41	5,706
September 14	6:00 p.m.	at North Carolina*		Kenan Memorial Stadium; Chapel Hill, NC	ACC Network	L 10–45	45,491
September 21	7:00 p.m.	North Carolina A&T*		O'Kelly–Riddick Stadium; Durham, NC (rivalry)	ESPNU	W 66–24	14,400
September 28	3:00 p.m.	vs. Norfolk State		Lucas Oil Stadium; Indianapolis, IN (Circle City Classic)	ESPNU	W 37–10	N/A
October 5	4:00 p.m.	at Campbell*		Barker–Lane Stadium; Buies Creek, NC	FloSports	W 45–14	4,415
October 12	2:00 p.m.	Virginia–Lynchburg*	No. 25	O'Kelly–Riddick Stadium; Durham, NC	ESPN+	W 68–0	5,500
October 26	3:00 p.m.	Morgan State^{†}	No. 20	O'Kelly–Riddick Stadium; Durham, NC	ESPN+	W 16–7	13,910
October 31	7:30 p.m.	at South Carolina State	No. 19	Oliver C. Dawson Stadium; Orangeburg, SC	ESPN2	L 21–24	11,169
November 15	8:00 p.m.	Howard		O'Kelly–Riddick Stadium; Durham, NC	ESPNU	W 26–3	5,429
November 23	1:00 p.m.	at Delaware State		Alumni Stadium; Dover, DE	ESPN+	W 52–10	2,313
*Non-conference game; ^{†}Homecoming; Rankings from STATS Poll released prior to the game; All times are in Eastern time

== Game summaries ==
=== vs. Alabama State ===
Game One – North Carolina Central Eagles (0–0) vs Alabama State Hornets (0–0) – Game summary

Quarter	1	2	3	4	Total
Eagles	0	0	0	0	0
Hornets	0	0	0	0	0

at Hard Rock Stadium, Miami Gardens, Florida

- Date: Sunday September 1, 2024
- Game time: 3:00 PM
- TV announcers (ESPN): Tiffany Greene (play-by-play) and Jay Walker (analyst)

Game information

First quarter
Second quarter
Third quarter
Fourth quarter

Statistics	NCCU	ALST
First downs		
Total yards		
Rushing yards		
Passing yards		
Passing: Comp–Att–Int		
Time of possession		

Team	Category	Player	Statistics
North Carolina Central	Passing		
North Carolina Central	Rushing		
North Carolina Central	Receiving		
Alabama State	Passing		
Alabama State	Rushing		
Alabama State	Receiving		

=== Elon ===
Game Two – Elon Phoenix (0–1) at North Carolina Central Eagles (1–0) – Game summary

Quarter	1	2	3	4	Total
Phoenix	0	0	0	0	0
Eagles	0	0	0	0	0

at O'Kelly–Riddick Stadium • Durham, NC

- Date: Saturday, September 7, 2024
- Game time: 6:00 p.m.
- TV: ESPN+

Game information

First quarter
Second quarter
Third quarter
Fourth quarter

Statistics	ELON	NCCU
First downs		
Total yards		
Rushing yards		
Passing yards		
Passing: Comp–Att–Int		
Time of possession		

Team	Category	Player	Statistics
Elon	Passing		
Elon	Rushing		
Elon	Receiving		
North Carolina Central	Passing		
North Carolina Central	Rushing		
North Carolina Central	Receiving		

=== at North Carolina (FBS) ===
Game Three – North Carolina Central Eagles (1–1) at North Carolina Tar Heels (FBS) (2–0) – Game summary

Quarter	1	2	3	4	Total
Eagles	7	3	0	0	10
Tar Heels (FBS)	0	17	0	28	45

at Kenan Memorial Stadium, Chapel Hill, North Carolina

- Date: Saturday September 14, 2024
- Game time: 6:00 PM
- Game weather: Cloudy • 78 °F (26 °C) • Wind: NE at 10 miles per hour (16 km/h)
- Game attendance: 45,491
- Referee: Marcus Woods
- TV announcers (ACCNX/ESPN+): Kevin Fitzgerald, Charlie Strong and Ashley Stroehlein

Game information

First quarter

- (7:32) NCCU – J'Mari Taylor 5-yard run (Juan Velarde kick) (Drive: 12 plays, 75 yards, 7:28; NCCU 7-0)

Second quarter

- (14:38) UNC – Omarion Hampton 11-yard run (Liam Boyd kick) (Drive: 4 plays, 41 yards, 1:15; 7-7)
- (10:06) UNC — Omarion Hampton 2-yard run (Liam Boyd kick) (Drive: 10 plays, 67 yards, 3:35; North Carolina 14-7)
- (5:51) UNC — Liam Boyd 36-yard field goal (Drive: 7 plays, 65 yards, 2:17; North Carolina 17-7)
- (0:00) NCCU - Juan Velarde 35-yard field goal (Drive: 14 plays, 47 yards, 5:51; North Carolina 17-10)

Third quarter

- no scoring

Fourth quarter

- (14:12) UNC — John Copenhaver 23-yard pass from Jacolby Criswell (Liam Boyd kick) (Drive: 5 plays, 71 yards, 1:41; North Carolina 24-10)
- (10:42) UNC — Omarion Hampton 4-yard run (Liam Boyd kick) (Drive: 5 plays, 30 yards, 1:59; North Carolina 31-10)
- (5:59) UNC — Davion Gause 1-yard run (Liam Boyd kick) (Drive: 7 plays, 56 yards, 2:34; North Carolina 38-10)
- (0:38) UNC — Charleston French 45-yard run (Liam Boyd kick) (Drive: 4 plays, 71 yards, 1:28; North Carolina 45-10)

Statistics	NCCU	UNC
First downs	16	26
Total yards	167	513
Rushing yards	76	330
Passing yards	91	183
Passing: Comp–Att–Int	9-21-1	16-29-0
Time of possession	33:41	26:19

Team	Category	Player	Statistics
North Carolina Central	Passing	Walker Harris	7/15, 88 yards
North Carolina Central	Rushing	J'Mari Taylor	21 carries, 46 yards, TD
North Carolina Central	Receiving	Chance Peterson	5 receptions, 60 yards
North Carolina	Passing	Jacolby Criswell	14/23, 161 yards, TD
North Carolina	Rushing	Omarion Hampton	25 carries, 210 yards, 3 TD
North Carolina	Receiving	John Copenhaver	6 receptions, 60 yards, TD

=== North Carolina A&T (rivalry) ===
Game Four – North Carolina A&T Aggies (1–2) at North Carolina Central Eagles (1–2) – Game summary

Quarter	1	2	3	4	Total
Aggies	0	0	0	0	0
Eagles	0	0	0	0	0

at O'Kelly–Riddick Stadium • Durham, NC

- Date: Saturday, September 21, 2024
- Game time: 7:00 p.m.
- TV announcers (ESPNU): Tiffany Greene (play-by-play) and Jay Walker (analyst)

Game information

First quarter
Second quarter
Third quarter
Fourth quarter

Statistics	NCAT	NCCU
First downs		
Total yards		
Rushing yards		
Passing yards		
Passing: Comp–Att–Int		
Time of possession		

Team	Category	Player	Statistics
North Carolina A&T	Passing		
North Carolina A&T	Rushing		
North Carolina A&T	Receiving		
North Carolina Central	Passing		
North Carolina Central	Rushing		
North Carolina Central	Receiving		

=== vs. Norfolk State ===
Game Five – North Carolina Central Eagles (2–2) vs Norfolk State Spartans (2–3) – Game summary

Quarter	1	2	3	4	Total
Eagles	0	0	0	0	0
Spartans	0	0	0	0	0

at Lucas Oil Stadium, Indianapolis, Indiana

- Date: Saturday September 28, 2024
- Game time: 3:00 PM
- Game weather: none (indoor stadium)
- TV announcers (ESPNU): Tiffany Greene (play-by-play) and Jay Walker (analyst)

Game information

First quarter
Second quarter
Third quarter
Fourth quarter

Statistics	NCCU	NORF
First downs		
Total yards		
Rushing yards		
Passing yards		
Passing: Comp–Att–Int		
Time of possession		

Team	Category	Player	Statistics
North Carolina Central	Passing		
North Carolina Central	Rushing		
North Carolina Central	Receiving		
Norfolk State	Passing		
Norfolk State	Rushing		
Norfolk State	Receiving		

=== at Campbell ===
Game Six – North Carolina Central Eagles (3–2) vs Campbell Fighting Camels (2–3) – Game summary

Quarter	1	2	3	4	Total
Eagles	0	0	0	0	0
Fighting Camels	0	0	0	0	0

at Barker-Lane Stadium, Buies Creek, North Carolina

- Date: Saturday October 5, 2024
- Game time: 4:00 PM
- TV: FloSports

Game information

First quarter
Second quarter
Third quarter
Fourth quarter

Statistics	NCCU	CAM
First downs		
Total yards		
Rushing yards		
Passing yards		
Passing: Comp–Att–Int		
Time of possession		

Team	Category	Player	Statistics
North Carolina Central	Passing		
North Carolina Central	Rushing		
North Carolina Central	Receiving		
Campbell	Passing		
Campbell	Rushing		
Campbell	Receiving		

=== VUL (NCCAA) ===
Game Seven – VUL Dragons (NCCAA) (0–4) at No. 25 North Carolina Central Eagles (4–2) – Game summary

Quarter	1	2	3	4	Total
Dragons (NCCAA)	0	0	0	0	0
No. 25 Eagles	0	0	0	0	0

at O'Kelly–Riddick Stadium • Durham, NC

- Date: Saturday October 12, 2024
- Game time: 2:00 p.m.
- TV: ESPN+

Game information

First quarter
Second quarter
Third quarter
Fourth quarter

Statistics	VUL	NCCU
First downs		
Total yards		
Rushing yards		
Passing yards		
Passing: Comp–Att–Int		
Time of possession		

Team	Category	Player	Statistics
VUL	Passing		
VUL	Rushing		
VUL	Receiving		
North Carolina Central	Passing		
North Carolina Central	Rushing		
North Carolina Central	Receiving		

=== Morgan State ===
Game Eight – Morgan State Bears (3–4) at No. 20 North Carolina Central Eagles (5–2) – Game summary

Quarter	1	2	3	4	Total
Bears	0	0	0	0	0
No. 20 Eagles	0	0	0	0	0

at O'Kelly–Riddick Stadium • Durham, NC

- Date: Saturday October 26, 2024
- Game time: 3:00 p.m.
- TV announcers (ESPN+): Jason Ross Jr. (play-by-play) and Tyoka Jackson (analyst)

Game information

First quarter
Second quarter
Third quarter
Fourth quarter

Statistics	MORG	NCCU
First downs		
Total yards		
Rushing yards		
Passing yards		
Passing: Comp–Att–Int		
Time of possession		

Team	Category	Player	Statistics
Morgan State	Passing		
Morgan State	Rushing		
Morgan State	Receiving		
North Carolina Central	Passing		
North Carolina Central	Rushing		
North Carolina Central	Receiving		

=== at South Carolina State ===
Game Nine – No. 19 North Carolina Central Eagles (6–2) vs South Carolina State Bulldogs (5–2) – Game summary

Quarter	1	2	3	4	Total
No. 19 Eagles	0	0	0	0	0
Bulldogs	0	0	0	0	0

at Oliver C. Dawson Stadium, Orangeburg, South Carolina

- Date: Thursday October 31, 2024
- Game time: 7:30 PM
- TV announcers (ESPN2): Tiffany Greene (play-by-play) and Jay Walker (analyst)

Game information

First quarter
Second quarter
Third quarter
Fourth quarter

Statistics	NCCU	SCST
First downs		
Total yards		
Rushing yards		
Passing yards		
Passing: Comp–Att–Int		
Time of possession		

Team	Category	Player	Statistics
North Carolina Central	Passing		
North Carolina Central	Rushing		
North Carolina Central	Receiving		
South Carolina State	Passing		
South Carolina State	Rushing		
South Carolina State	Receiving		

=== Howard ===
Game Ten – Howard Bison (4–6) at North Carolina Central Eagles (6–3) – Game summary

Quarter	1	2	3	4	Total
Bison	3	0	0	0	3
Eagles	0	6	7	13	26

at O'Kelly–Riddick Stadium • Durham, NC

- Date: Friday November 15, 2024
- Game time: 8:00 p.m.
- Game weather: Clear • Temperature: 50 °F (10 °C) • Wind: NW 3 miles per hour (4.8 km/h)
- Game attendance: 5,429
- Referee: Derek Hatten
- TV announcers (ESPNU): Tiffany Greene (play-by-play) and Jay Walker (analyst)

Game information

First quarter

- (0:09) HOW – Dylan West 36-yard field goal (Drive: 9 plays, 62 yards, 4:09; Howard 3–0)

Second quarter

- (0:23) NCCU – Chris Mosley 12-yard pass from Walker Harris (Drive: 11 plays, 71 yards, 2:14; North Carolina Central 6–3)

Third quarter

- (7:44) NCCU – J'Mari Taylor 61-yard run, Juan Velarde kick (Drive: 2 plays, 76 yards, 0:46; North Carolina Central 13–3)

Fourth quarter

- (13:33) NCCU – J'Mari Taylor 18-yard run, Juan Velarde kick (Drive: 5 plays, 33 yards, 2:44; North Carolina Central 20–3)
- (6:14) NCCU – J'Mari Taylor 40-yard run (Drive: 4 plays, 79 yards, 2:23; North Carolina Central 26–3)

Statistics	HOW	NCCU
First downs	9	27
Total yards	121	563
Rushing yards	38	242
Passing yards	83	321
Passing: Comp–Att–Int	11–26–0	20–36–2
Time of possession	26:54	32:51

Team	Category	Player	Statistics
Howard	Passing	Ja'Shawn Scroggins	11/26, 83 yards
Howard	Rushing	Jarett Hunter	8 carries, 29 yards
Howard	Receiving	Isiah Williams	3 receptions, 29 yards
North Carolina Central	Passing	Walker Harris	20/35, 321 yards, TD, INT
North Carolina Central	Rushing	J'Mari Taylor	24 carries, 206 yards, 3 TD
North Carolina Central	Receiving	J'Mari Taylor	6 receptions, 78 yards

=== at Delaware State ===
Game Eleven – North Carolina Central Eagles (7–3) vs Delaware State Hornets (1–10) – Game summary

Quarter	1	2	3	4	Total
Eagles	0	0	0	0	0
Hornets	0	0	0	0	0

at Alumni Stadium, Dover, Delaware

- Date: Saturday November 23, 2024
- Game time: 1:00 PM
- TV: ESPN+

Game information

First quarter
Second quarter
Third quarter
Fourth quarter

Statistics	NCCU	DSU
First downs		
Total yards		
Rushing yards		
Passing yards		
Passing: Comp–Att–Int		
Time of possession		

Team	Category	Player	Statistics
North Carolina Central	Passing		
North Carolina Central	Rushing		
North Carolina Central	Receiving		
Delaware State	Passing		
Delaware State	Rushing		
Delaware State	Receiving		
