= 2024 Norfolk State Spartans football team =

American college football season

2024 Norfolk State Spartans football
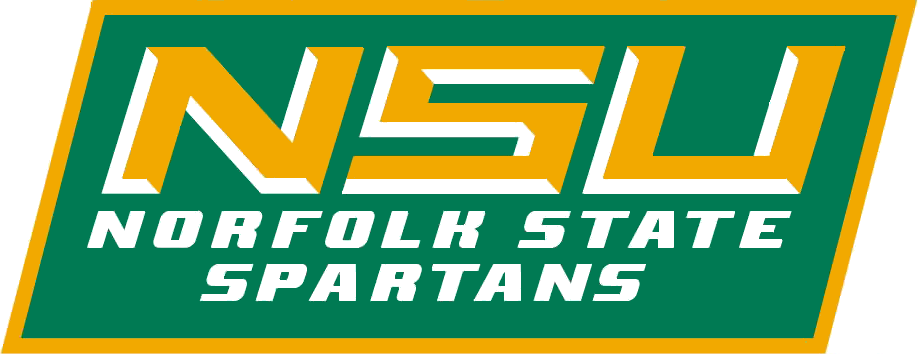
- Conference: Mid-Eastern Athletic Conference
- Record: 4–8 (2–3 MEAC)
- Head coach: Dawson Odums (4th season)
- Offensive coordinator: Ryan Meyers (3rd season)
- Defensive coordinator: Steve Adams (4th season)
- Home stadium: William "Dick" Price Stadium

2024 Mid-Eastern Athletic Conference football standings
	Conf.			Overall
Team	W		L	W		L
No. 24 South Carolina State $	5	–	0	9	–	3
North Carolina Central	4	–	1	8	–	3
Morgan State	3	–	2	6	–	6
Norfolk State	2	–	3	4	–	8
Howard	1	–	4	4	–	8
Delaware State	0	–	5	1	–	11
$ – Conference champion; Rankings from STATS Poll

The 2024 Norfolk State Spartans football team represented Norfolk State University as a member of the Mid-Eastern Athletic Conference (MEAC) during the 2024 NCAA Division I FCS football season. The Spartans were led by fourth-year head coach Dawson Odums and played their home games at William "Dick" Price Stadium in Norfolk, Virginia.

== Schedule ==
Date	Time	Opponent	Site	TV	Result	Attendance
August 24	7:30 p.m.	vs. Florida A&M*	Center Parc Stadium; Atlanta, GA (MEAC/SWAC Challenge)	ABC	L 23–24	22,210
August 31	6:00 p.m.	at East Carolina*	Dowdy–Ficklen Stadium; Greenville, NC	ESPN+	L 3–42	36,467
September 7	2:00 p.m.	Virginia State*	William "Dick" Price Stadium; Norfolk, VA	ESPN+	W 28–23	17,827
September 14	2:00 p.m.	Hampton*	William "Dick" Price Stadium; Norfolk, VA (Battle of the Bay)	ESPN+	L 7–37	15,011
September 21	1:30 p.m.	at VMI*	Alumni Memorial Field; Lexington, VA	ESPN+	W 32–10	3,108
September 28	3:00 p.m.	North Carolina Central	Lucas Oil Stadium; Indianapolis, IN (Circle City Classic)	ESPNU	L 10–37	N/A
October 5	1:00 p.m.	at Sacred Heart*	Campus Field; Fairfield, CT	SNY	L 3–10	8,353
October 12	2:00 p.m.	Towson*	William "Dick" Price Stadium; Norfolk, VA	ESPN+	L 23–28	5,003
October 26	2:00 p.m.	Howard^{†}	William "Dick" Price Stadium; Norfolk, VA	ESPN+	W 21–20	31,876
November 2	1:00 p.m.	at Morgan State	Hughes Stadium; Baltimore, MD	ESPN+	L 37–38 ^{OT}	2,489
November 16	12:00 p.m.	Delaware State	William "Dick" Price Stadium; Norfolk, VA	ESPN+	W 38–19	3,002
November 23	1:30 p.m.	at No. 23 South Carolina State	Oliver C. Dawson Stadium; Orangeburg, SC	ESPN+	L 21–53	9,169
*Non-conference game; ^{†}Homecoming; Rankings from STATS Poll released prior to the game; All times are in Eastern time

== Game summaries ==
=== vs. Florida A&M ===
Game One – Florida A&M Rattlers (0–0) vs Norfolk State Spartans (0–0) – Game summary

Quarter	1	2	3	4	Total
Rattlers	7	3	14	0	24
Spartans	14	0	3	6	23

at Center Parc Stadium, Atlanta, Georgia

- Date: Saturday August 24, 2024
- Game time: 7:30 PM
- Game attendance: 22,210
- Referee: Derek Hatten
- TV announcers (ABC): Tiffany Greene (play-by-play), Jay Walker (analyst), Quint Kessenich (sideline)

Game information

First quarter

- (13:18) NORF – Kevon King 82-yard run (Grandin Wilcox kick) (Drive: 3 plays, 92 yards, 1:37; Norfolk State 7-0)
- (3:49) NORF – Jalen Daniels 1-yard run (Grandin Wilcox kick) (Drive: 12 plays, 73 yards, 6:47; Norfolk State 14-0)
- (0:55) FAMU – Thad Franklin Jr. 20-yard pass from Daniel Richardson (Cameron Gillis kick) (Drive: 7 plays, 75 yards, 2:54; Norfolk State 14-7)

Second quarter

- (11:02) FAMU – Cameron Gillis 33-yard field goal (Drive: 5 plays, 31 yards, 2:23; Norfolk State 14-10)

Third quarter

- (12:37) FAMU – Jamari Gassett 55-yard pass from Daniel Richardson (Cameron Gillis kick) (Drive: 5 plays, 82 yards, 2:19; Florida A&M 17-14)
- (9:04) NORF – Grandin Wilcox 29-yard field goal (Drive: 6 plays, 63 yards, 3:33; Tied 17-17)
- (3:27) FAMU – Jamari Gassett 9-yard pass from Daniel Richardson (Cameron Gillis kick) (Drive: 10 plays, 75 yards, 5:17; Florida A&M 24-17)

Fourth quarter

- (6:29) NORF – Kevon King 2-yard run (run failed) (Drive: 9 plays, 73 yards, 5:02; Florida A&M 24-23)

Statistics	FAMU	NORF
First downs	22	15
Total yards	54–406	51–371
Rushing yards	24–120	42–229
Passing yards	286	142
Passing: Comp–Att–Int	22–30–0	7–9–0
Time of possession	28:56	31:04

Team	Category	Player	Statistics
Florida A&M	Passing	Daniel Richardson	22/30, 286 yards, 3 TD
Florida A&M	Rushing	Kelvin Dean	11 carries, 49 yards
Florida A&M	Receiving	Jamari Gassett	8 receptions, 110 yards, 2 TD
Norfolk State	Passing	Jalen Daniels	7/9, 142 yards
Norfolk State	Rushing	Kevon King	14 carries, 146 yards, 2 TD
Norfolk State	Receiving	Jacquez Jones	4 receptions, 78 yards

=== at East Carolina (FBS) ===
Game Two – Norfolk State Spartans (0–1) vs East Carolina Pirates (FBS) (0–0) – Game summary

Quarter	1	2	3	4	Total
Spartans	3	0	0	0	3
Pirates (FBS)	14	14	7	7	42

at Dowdy-Ficklen Stadium, Greenville, North Carolina

- Date: Saturday August 31, 2024
- Game time: 6:00 PM
- Game weather: Cloudy • Temperature: 85 °F (29 °C) • Wind: SE at 3 miles per hour (4.8 km/h)
- Game attendance: 36,467
- Referee: Matt Overton
- TV announcers (ESPN+): Joe Tordy (play-by-play), Reggie Walker Jr. (analyst)

Game information

First quarter

- (8:17) NORF – Grandin Willcox 39 yard field goal (Drive: 10 plays, 34 yards, 5:26; Norfolk State 3–0)
- (6:31) ECU – Casey Kelly 22 yard pass from Jake Garcia, Andrew Conrad kick (Drive: 7 plays, 45 yards, 1:37; East Carolina 7–3)
- (3:47) ECU – Javious Bond 14 yard run, Andrew Conrad kick (Drive: 4 plays, 76 yards, 1:03; East Carolina 14–3)

Second quarter

- (13:35) ECU – Gavin Gibson 30 yard interception return, Andrew Conrad kick (East Carolina 21–3)
- (3:47) ECU – Desirrio Riles 3 yard pass from Jake Garcia, Andrew Conrad kick (Drive: 5 plays, 21 yards, 1:51; East Carolina 28–3)

Third quarter

- (10:07) ECU – Anthony Smith 18 yard pass from Jake Garcia, Andrew Conrad kick (Drive: 4 plays, 40 yards, 1:23; East Carolina 35–3)

Fourth quarter

- (10:12) ECU – Desirrio Riles 32 yard pass from Jake Garcia, Andrew Conrad kick (Drive: 7 plays, 72 yards, 2:17; East Carolina 42–3)

Statistics	NORF	ECU
First downs	7	31
Total yards	114	506
Rushing yards	43	148
Passing yards	71	358
Passing: Comp–Att–Int	8–19–1	26–39–3
Time of possession	36:25	23:35

Team	Category	Player	Statistics
Norfolk State	Passing	Jalen Daniels	8/19, 71 yards, 1 INT
Norfolk State	Rushing	Kevon King	5 carries, 26 yards
Norfolk State	Receiving	Jacquez Jones	3 receptions, 31 yards
East Carolina	Passing	Jake Garcia	23/36, 308 yards, 4 TD, 3 INT
East Carolina	Rushing	London Montgomery	14 carries, 67 yards
East Carolina	Receiving	Anthony Smith	5 receptions, 86 yards, 1 TD

=== vs. Virginia State (D-II) ===
Game Three – Virginia State Trojans (D-II) (1–0) vs Norfolk State Spartans (0–2) – Game summary

Quarter	1	2	3	4	Total
Trojans (D-II)	7	7	3	6	23
Spartans	7	14	0	7	28

at William "Dick" Price Stadium, Norfolk, Virginia

- Date: Saturday September 7, 2024
- Game time: 2:00 PM
- Game weather: Sunny
- Game attendance: 17,827
- Referee: Toby Johnson
- TV: ESPN+

Game information

First quarter

- (9:17) NORF – Jacquez Jones 60-yard pass from Jalen Daniels, Grandin Wilcox kick (Drive: 5 plays, 80 yards, 2:25; Norfolk State 7–0)
- (3:20) VAST – Kevin Gayles 22-yard pass from Romelo Williams, Josuah Campbell kick (Drive: 12 plays, 92 yards, 5:52; Tied 7–7)

Second quarter

- (12:19) VAST – Jimmyll Williams 2-yard run, Josuah Campbell kick (Drive: 8 plays, 60 yards, 4:25; Virginia State 14–7)
- (10:07) NORF – Jalen Daniels 11-yard run, Grandin Wilcox kick (Drive: 5 plays, 70 yards, 2:06; Tied 14–14)
- (4:01) NORF – Kam'Ryn Thomas 22-yard pass from Jalen Daniels, Grandin Wilcox kick (Drive: 7 plays, 55 yards, 4:18; Norfolk State 21–14)

Third quarter

- (2:34) VAST – Josuah Campbell 28-yard field goal (Drive: 6 plays, 19 yards, 3:29; Norfolk State 21–17)

Fourth quarter

- (13:27) NORF – Kevon King 64-yard run, Grandin Wilcox kick (Drive: 7 plays, 95 yards, 3:56; Norfolk State 28–17)
- (5:13) VAST – Romelo Williams 7-yard run (Drive: 8 plays, 67 yards, 3:51; Norfolk State 28–23)

Statistics	VAST	NORF
First downs	17	20
Total yards	288	467
Rushing yards	117	257
Passing yards	171	210
Passing: Comp–Att–Int	14–20–1	14–21–1
Time of possession	26:50	33:10

Team	Category	Player	Statistics
Virginia State	Passing	Romelo Williams	14/20, 171 yards, TD, INT
Virginia State	Rushing	Jimmyll Williams	21 carries, 60 yards, TD
Virginia State	Receiving	Malik Hunter	5 receptions, 72 yards
Norfolk State	Passing	Jalen Daniels	14/21, 210 yards, 2 TD, INT
Norfolk State	Rushing	Kevon King	20 carries, 137 yards, TD
Norfolk State	Receiving	Jacquez Jones	4 receptions, 109 yards, TD

=== vs. Hampton (Battle of the Bay) ===
Game Four – Hampton Pirates (1–1) vs Norfolk State Spartans (1–2) – Game summary

Quarter	1	2	3	4	Total
Pirates	0	0	0	0	0
Spartans	0	0	0	0	0

at William "Dick" Price Stadium, Norfolk, Virginia

- Date: Saturday September 14, 2024
- Game time: 2:00 PM
- TV: ESPN+

Game information

First quarter
Second quarter
Third quarter
Fourth quarter

Statistics	HAMP	NORF
First downs		
Total yards		
Rushing yards		
Passing yards		
Passing: Comp–Att–Int		
Time of possession		

Team	Category	Player	Statistics
Hampton	Passing		
Hampton	Rushing		
Hampton	Receiving		
Norfolk State	Passing		
Norfolk State	Rushing		
Norfolk State	Receiving		

=== at VMI ===
Game Five – Norfolk State Spartans (1–2) vs VMI Keydets (0–3) – Game summary

Quarter	1	2	3	4	Total
Spartans	0	0	0	0	0
Keydets	0	0	0	0	0

at Alumni Memorial Field, Lexington, Virginia

- Date: Saturday September 21, 2024
- Game time: 1:30 PM
- TV: ESPN+

Game information

First quarter
Second quarter
Third quarter
Fourth quarter

Statistics	NORF	VMI
First downs		
Total yards		
Rushing yards		
Passing yards		
Passing: Comp–Att–Int		
Time of possession		

Team	Category	Player	Statistics
Norfolk State	Passing		
Norfolk State	Rushing		
Norfolk State	Receiving		
VMI	Passing		
VMI	Rushing		
VMI	Receiving		

=== vs. NC Central ===
Game Six – North Carolina Central Eagles (2–2) vs Norfolk State Spartans (2–3) – Game summary

Quarter	1	2	3	4	Total
Eagles	0	0	0	0	0
Spartans	0	0	0	0	0

at Lucas Oil Stadium, Indianapolis, Indiana

- Date: Saturday September 28, 2024
- Game time: 3:00 PM
- Game weather: none (indoor stadium)
- TV announcers (ESPNU): Tiffany Greene (play-by-play) and Jay Walker (analyst)

Game information

First quarter
Second quarter
Third quarter
Fourth quarter

Statistics	NCCU	NORF
First downs		
Total yards		
Rushing yards		
Passing yards		
Passing: Comp–Att–Int		
Time of possession		

Team	Category	Player	Statistics
North Carolina Central	Passing		
North Carolina Central	Rushing		
North Carolina Central	Receiving		
Norfolk State	Passing		
Norfolk State	Rushing		
Norfolk State	Receiving		

=== at Sacred Heart ===
Game Seven – Norfolk State Spartans (2–4) vs Sacred Heart Pioneers (2–3) – Game summary

Quarter	1	2	3	4	Total
Spartans	0	0	0	0	0
Pioneers	0	0	0	0	0

at Campus Field, Fairfield, Connecticut

- Date: Saturday October 5, 2024
- Game time: 1:00 PM
- TV: SNY

Game information

First quarter
Second quarter
Third quarter
Fourth quarter

Statistics	NORF	SHU
First downs		
Total yards		
Rushing yards		
Passing yards		
Passing: Comp–Att–Int		
Time of possession		

Team	Category	Player	Statistics
Norfolk State	Passing		
Norfolk State	Rushing		
Norfolk State	Receiving		
Sacred Heart	Passing		
Sacred Heart	Rushing		
Sacred Heart	Receiving		

=== vs Towson ===
Game Eight – Towson Tigers (2–3) vs Norfolk State Spartans (2–5) – Game summary

Quarter	1	2	3	4	Total
Tigers	0	0	0	0	0
Spartans	0	0	0	0	0

at William "Dick" Price Stadium, Norfolk, Virginia

- Date: Saturday October 12, 2024
- Game time: 2:00 PM
- TV: ESPN+

Game information

First quarter
Second quarter
Third quarter
Fourth quarter

Statistics	TOW	NORF
First downs		
Total yards		
Rushing yards		
Passing yards		
Passing: Comp–Att–Int		
Time of possession		

Team	Category	Player	Statistics
Towson	Passing		
Towson	Rushing		
Towson	Receiving		
Norfolk State	Passing		
Norfolk State	Rushing		
Norfolk State	Receiving		

=== vs Howard ===
Game Nine – Howard Bison (3–4) vs Norfolk State Spartans (2–6) – Game summary

Quarter	1	2	3	4	Total
Bison	0	0	0	0	0
Spartans	0	0	0	0	0

at William "Dick" Price Stadium, Norfolk, Virginia

- Date: Saturday October 26, 2024
- Game time: 2:00 PM
- TV: ESPN+

Game information

First quarter
Second quarter
Third quarter
Fourth quarter

Statistics	HOW	NORF
First downs		
Total yards		
Rushing yards		
Passing yards		
Passing: Comp–Att–Int		
Time of possession		

Team	Category	Player	Statistics
Howard	Passing		
Howard	Rushing		
Howard	Receiving		
Norfolk State	Passing		
Norfolk State	Rushing		
Norfolk State	Receiving		

=== at Morgan State ===
Game Ten – Norfolk State Spartans (3–6) vs Morgan State Bears (3–5) – Game summary

Quarter	1	2	3	4	Total
Spartans	0	0	0	0	0
Bears	0	0	0	0	0

at Hughes Stadium, Baltimore, Maryland

- Date: Saturday November 2, 2024
- Game time: 1:00 PM
- TV: ESPN+

Game information

First quarter
Second quarter
Third quarter
Fourth quarter

Statistics	NORF	MORG
First downs		
Total yards		
Rushing yards		
Passing yards		
Passing: Comp–Att–Int		
Time of possession		

Team	Category	Player	Statistics
Norfolk State	Passing		
Norfolk State	Rushing		
Norfolk State	Receiving		
Morgan State	Passing		
Morgan State	Rushing		
Morgan State	Receiving		

=== vs Delaware State ===
Game Eleven – Delaware State Hornets (1–9) vs Norfolk State Spartans (3–7) – Game summary

Quarter	1	2	3	4	Total
Hornets	0	0	0	0	0
Spartans	0	0	0	0	0

at William "Dick" Price Stadium, Norfolk, Virginia

- Date: Saturday November 16, 2024
- Game time: 2:00 PM
- TV: ESPN+

Game information

First quarter
Second quarter
Third quarter
Fourth quarter

Statistics	DSU	NORF
First downs		
Total yards		
Rushing yards		
Passing yards		
Passing: Comp–Att–Int		
Time of possession		

Team	Category	Player	Statistics
Delaware State	Passing		
Delaware State	Rushing		
Delaware State	Receiving		
Norfolk State	Passing		
Norfolk State	Rushing		
Norfolk State	Receiving		

=== at No. 23 South Carolina State ===
Game Twelve – Norfolk State Spartans (4–7) vs No. 23 South Carolina State Bulldogs (8–2) – Game summary

Quarter	1	2	3	4	Total
Spartans	0	0	0	0	0
No. 23 Bulldogs	0	0	0	0	0

at Oliver C. Dawson Stadium, Orangeburg, South Carolina

- Date: Saturday November 23, 2024
- Game time: 1:30 PM
- TV: ESPN+

Game information

First quarter
Second quarter
Third quarter
Fourth quarter

Statistics	NORF	SCST
First downs		
Total yards		
Rushing yards		
Passing yards		
Passing: Comp–Att–Int		
Time of possession		

Team	Category	Player	Statistics
Norfolk State	Passing		
Norfolk State	Rushing		
Norfolk State	Receiving		
South Carolina State	Passing		
South Carolina State	Rushing		
South Carolina State	Receiving		
