= 2024 Morgan State Bears football team =

American college football season

2024 Morgan State Bears football
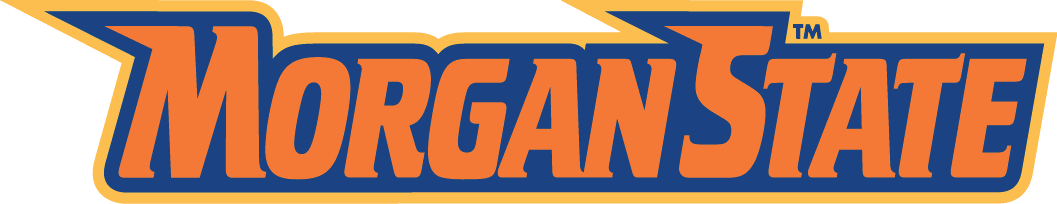
- Conference: Mid-Eastern Athletic Conference
- Record: 6–6 (3–2 MEAC)
- Head coach: Damon Wilson (3rd season)
- Offensive coordinator: Apollo Wright (1st season)
- Defensive coordinator: Antone' Sewell (3rd season)
- Home stadium: Hughes Stadium

2024 Mid-Eastern Athletic Conference football standings
	Conf.			Overall
Team	W		L	W		L
No. 24 South Carolina State $	5	–	0	9	–	3
North Carolina Central	4	–	1	8	–	3
Morgan State	3	–	2	6	–	6
Norfolk State	2	–	3	4	–	8
Howard	1	–	4	4	–	8
Delaware State	0	–	5	1	–	11
$ – Conference champion; Rankings from STATS Poll

The 2024 Morgan State Bears football team represented Morgan State University as a member of the Mid-Eastern Athletic Conference (MEAC) during the 2024 NCAA Division I FCS football season. The Bears were led by third-year head coach Damon Wilson, and played their home games at Hughes Stadium in Baltimore.

== Schedule ==
Date	Time	Opponent	Site	TV	Result	Attendance
August 31	6:00 p.m.	at Hampton*	Armstrong Stadium; Hampton, VA	FloSports	W 30–28	7,714
September 7	6:00 p.m.	at Towson*	Johnny Unitas Stadium; Towson, MD (The Battle for Greater Baltimore)	FloSports	L 9–14	8,394
September 14	3:30 p.m.	at Ohio*	Peden Stadium; Athens, OH	ESPN+	L 6–21	20,438
September 21	7:00 p.m.	Virginia–Lynchburg*	Hughes Stadium; Baltimore, MD	ESPN+	W 56–7	6,875
September 28	3:30 p.m.	at Stony Brook*	Kenneth P. LaValle Stadium; Stony Brook, NY	FloSports	L 3–22	4,818
October 5	1:00 p.m.	Lincoln (PA)*^{†}	Hughes Stadium; Baltimore, MD	ESPN+	W 41–0	7,632
October 12	3:00 p.m.	Merrimack*	Hughes Stadium; Baltimore, MD	ESPN+	L 24–32	3,584
October 26	3:00 p.m.	at No. 20 North Carolina Central	O'Kelly–Riddick Stadium; Durham, NC	ESPN+	L 7–16	13,910
November 2	1:00 p.m.	Norfolk State	Hughes Stadium; Baltimore, MD	ESPN+	W 38–37 ^{OT}	2,489
November 9	12:00 p.m.	at Delaware State	Alumni Stadium; Dover, DE	ESPN+	W 36–28	3,107
November 16	4:00 p.m.	South Carolina State	Hughes Stadium; Baltimore, MD	ESPN+	L 7–54	1,265
November 23	1:00 p.m.	Howard	Hughes Stadium; Baltimore, MD (rivalry)	ESPN+	W 35–21	973
*Non-conference game; ^{†}Homecoming; Rankings from STATS Poll released prior to the game; All times are in Eastern time

== Game summaries ==
=== at Hampton ===
Game One – Morgan State Bears (0–0) at Hampton Pirates (0–0) – Game summary

Quarter	1	2	3	4	Total
Bears	7	13	3	7	30
Pirates	7	7	7	7	28

at Armstrong Stadium, Hampton, VA

- Date: Saturday August 31, 2024
- Game time: 6:00 p.m.
- Game attendance: 7,714
- TV: FloSports

Game information

First quarter
Second quarter
Third quarter
Fourth quarter

Statistics	MORG	HAMP
First downs		
Total yards		
Rushing yards		
Passing yards		
Passing: Comp–Att–Int		
Time of possession		

Team	Category	Player	Statistics
Morgan State	Passing		
Morgan State	Rushing		
Morgan State	Receiving		
Hampton	Passing		
Hampton	Rushing		
Hampton	Receiving		

=== at Towson ===
Game Two – Morgan State Bears (1–0) at Towson Tigers (0–1) – Game summary

Quarter	1	2	3	4	Total
Bears	3	0	6	0	9
Tigers	7	7	0	0	14

at Johnny Unitas Stadium, Towson, MD

- Date: Saturday September 7, 2024
- Game time: 6:00 p.m.
- TV: FloSports

Game information

First quarter
Second quarter
Third quarter
Fourth quarter

Statistics	MORG	TOW
First downs		
Total yards		
Rushing yards		
Passing yards		
Passing: Comp–Att–Int		
Time of possession		

Team	Category	Player	Statistics
Morgan State	Passing		
Morgan State	Rushing		
Morgan State	Receiving		
Towson	Passing		
Towson	Rushing		
Towson	Receiving		

=== at Ohio ===
Game Three – Morgan State Bears (1–1) at Ohio Bobcats (1–1) – Game summary

Quarter	1	2	3	4	Total
Bears	3	3	0	0	6
Bobcats	14	0	7	0	21

at Peden Stadium • Athens, OH

- Date: September 14
- Game time: 3:30 p.m. EDT
- Game weather: Temperature:87 °F (31 °C) • Wind: 9 mph • Weather: Sunny
- Game attendance: 20,438
- Referee: William Williams
- TV announcers (ESPN+): Michael Reghi (play-by-play) and Marcus Ray (analyst)

Game information

First quarter

- (6:37) OHIO – Anthony Tyus III 19-yard pass from Parker Navarro (Gianni Spetic kick), Drive: 7 plays, 82 yards, 3:37; OHIO 7–0
- (3:03) MSU – Beckett Leary 30-yard field goal, Drive: 10 plays, 62 yards, 4:36; OHIO 7–3
- (0:00) OHIO – Parker Navarro 10-yard run (Gianni Spetic kick), Drive: 4 plays, 81 yards, 1:53; OHIO 14–3

Second quarter

- (3:03) MSU – Beckett Leary 33-yard field goal, Drive: 6 plays, 18 yards, 1:54; OHIO 14–6

Third quarter

- (10:20) OHIO – Anthony Tyus III 13-yard run (Gianni Spetic kick), Drive: 9 plays, 74 yards, 4:34; OHIO 21–6

Fourth quarter

- No scoring plays

Statistics	MORG	OHIO
First downs	16	22
Total yards	211	335
Rushing yards	75	148
Passing yards	136	187
Passing: Comp–Att–Int	15–30–1	14–19–4
Time of possession	29:33	30:27

Team	Category	Player	Statistics
Morgan State	Passing	Tahj Smith	15/30, 136 yards, INT
Morgan State	Rushing	Jason Collins Jr.	9 carries, 35 yards
Morgan State	Receiving	Andre Crawley	6 receptions, 65 yards
Ohio	Passing	Parker Navarro	12/15, 162 yards, TD, 3 INT
Ohio	Rushing	Anthony Tyus III	16 carries, 90 yards, TD
Ohio	Receiving	Coleman Owen	6 receptions, 112 yards

=== vs. Virginia–Lynchburg ===
Game Four – Virginia–Lynchburg Dragons (0–2) vs Morgan State Bears (1–2) – Game summary

Quarter	1	2	3	4	Total
Dragons	0	0	0	7	7
Bears	21	21	7	7	56

at Hughes Stadium, Baltimore, Maryland

- Date: Saturday September 21, 2024
- Game time: 7:00 p.m.
- TV: ESPN+

Game information

First quarter
Second quarter
Third quarter
Fourth quarter

Statistics	VUL	MORG
First downs		
Total yards		
Rushing yards		
Passing yards		
Passing: Comp–Att–Int		
Time of possession		

Team	Category	Player	Statistics
Virginia–Lynchburg	Passing		
Virginia–Lynchburg	Rushing		
Virginia–Lynchburg	Receiving		
Morgan State	Passing		
Morgan State	Rushing		
Morgan State	Receiving		

=== at Stony Brook ===
Game Five – Morgan State Bears (2–2) at Stony Brook Seawolves (3–1) – Game summary

Quarter	1	2	3	4	Total
Bears	3	0	0	0	3
Seawolves	0	16	6	0	22

at Kenneth P. LaValle Stadium • Stony Brook, NY

- Date: Saturday September 28, 2024
- Game time: 3:30 PM EST
- Game weather: Cloudy
- Game attendance: 4,818
- Referee: Alexander Randolph
- TV announcers (FloSports): Jonny Wincott (play-by-play), Brandon London (analyst) and Matt Levine (sideline)

Game information

First quarter

- (1:16) MORG – Beckett Leary 25-yard field goal (Drive: 7 plays, 74 yards, 3:29; Morgan State 3–0)

Second quarter

- (13:18) SBU – Roland Dempster 2-yard run (Drive: 9 plays, 72 yards, 2:54; Stony Brook 6–3)
- (6:34) SBU – Enda Kirby 28-yard field goal (Drive: 8 plays, 54 yards, 3:12; Stony Brook 9–3)
- (0:32) SBU – Roland Dempster 1-yard run, Enda Kirby kick (Drive: 8 plays, 44 yards, 2:35; Stony Brook 16–3)

Third quarter

- (9:22) SBU – Roland Dempster 4-yard run (Drive: 8 plays, 55 yards, 3:15; Stony Brook 22–3)

Fourth quarter

No scoring plays

Statistics	MORG	STBK
First downs	17	20
Total yards	259	428
Rushing yards	146	287
Passing yards	113	141
Passing: Comp–Att–Int	16–22–0	11–20–0
Time of possession	28:31	31:29

Team	Category	Player	Statistics
Morgan State	Passing	Duce Taylor	11/17, 70 yards
Morgan State	Rushing	Myles Miree	11 carries, 75 yards
Morgan State	Receiving	Malique Leatherbury	4 receptions, 25 yards
Stony Brook	Passing	Malachi Marshall	9/18, 132 yards
Stony Brook	Rushing	Roland Dempster	25 carries, 158 yards, 3 TD
Stony Brook	Receiving	Cal Redman	4 receptions, 62 yards

=== Lincoln (PA) ===
Game Six – Lincoln Lions (0–4) at Morgan State Bears (2–3) – Game summary

Quarter	1	2	3	4	Total
Lions	0	0	0	0	0
Bears	13	14	14	0	41

at Hughes Stadium • Baltimore, Maryland

- Date: Saturday October 5, 2024
- Game time: 1:00 p.m.
- Game weather: 0 °F (−18 °C)
- TV: ESPN+

Game information

First quarter
Second quarter
Third quarter
Fourth quarter

Statistics	LINP	MORG
First downs		
Total yards		
Rushing yards		
Passing yards		
Passing: Comp–Att–Int		
Time of possession		

Team	Category	Player	Statistics
Lincoln (PA)	Passing		
Lincoln (PA)	Rushing		
Lincoln (PA)	Receiving		
Morgan State	Passing		
Morgan State	Rushing		
Morgan State	Receiving		

=== Merrimack ===
Game Seven – Merrimack Warriors (1–4) at Morgan State Bears (3–3) – Game summary

Quarter	1	2	3	4	Total
Warriors	0	0	0	0	0
Bears	0	0	0	0	0

at Hughes Stadium • Baltimore, MD

- Date: Saturday October 12, 2024
- Game time: 3:00 p.m.
- Game weather: 0 °F (−18 °C)
- TV: ESPN+

Game information

First quarter
Second quarter
Third quarter
Fourth quarter

Statistics	MRMK	MORG
First downs		
Total yards		
Rushing yards		
Passing yards		
Passing: Comp–Att–Int		
Time of possession		

Team	Category	Player	Statistics
Merrimack	Passing		
Merrimack	Rushing		
Merrimack	Receiving		
Morgan State	Passing		
Morgan State	Rushing		
Morgan State	Receiving		

=== at No. 20 North Carolina Central ===
Game Eight – Morgan State Bears (3–4) at No. 20 North Carolina Central Eagles (5–2) – Game summary

Quarter	1	2	3	4	Total
Bears	0	0	0	0	0
No. 20 Eagles	0	0	0	0	0

at O'Kelly–Riddick Stadium • Durham, NC

- Date: Saturday October 26, 2024
- Game time: 3:00 p.m.
- TV announcers (ESPN+): Jason Ross Jr. (play-by-play) and Tyoka Jackson (analyst)

Game information

First quarter
Second quarter
Third quarter
Fourth quarter

Statistics	MORG	NCCU
First downs		
Total yards		
Rushing yards		
Passing yards		
Passing: Comp–Att–Int		
Time of possession		

Team	Category	Player	Statistics
Morgan State	Passing		
Morgan State	Rushing		
Morgan State	Receiving		
North Carolina Central	Passing		
North Carolina Central	Rushing		
North Carolina Central	Receiving		

=== vs. Norfolk State ===
Game Nine – Norfolk State Spartans (3–6) vs Morgan State Bears (3–5) – Game summary

Quarter	1	2	3	4	Total
Spartans	0	0	0	0	0
Bears	0	0	0	0	0

at Hughes Stadium, Baltimore, Maryland

- Date: Saturday November 2, 2024
- Game time: 1:00 p.m.
- TV: ESPN+

Game information

First quarter
Second quarter
Third quarter
Fourth quarter

Statistics	NORF	MORG
First downs		
Total yards		
Rushing yards		
Passing yards		
Passing: Comp–Att–Int		
Time of possession		

Team	Category	Player	Statistics
Norfolk State	Passing		
Norfolk State	Rushing		
Norfolk State	Receiving		
Morgan State	Passing		
Morgan State	Rushing		
Morgan State	Receiving		

=== at Delaware State ===
Game Ten – Morgan State Bears (4–5) vs Delaware State Hornets (1–8) – Game summary

Quarter	1	2	3	4	Total
Bears	0	0	0	0	0
Hornets	0	0	0	0	0

at Alumni Stadium, Dover, Delaware

- Date: Saturday November 9, 2024
- Game time: 12:00 PM
- TV: ESPN+

Game information

First quarter
Second quarter
Third quarter
Fourth quarter

Statistics	MORG	DSU
First downs		
Total yards		
Rushing yards		
Passing yards		
Passing: Comp–Att–Int		
Time of possession		

Team	Category	Player	Statistics
Morgan State	Passing		
Morgan State	Rushing		
Morgan State	Receiving		
Delaware State	Passing		
Delaware State	Rushing		
Delaware State	Receiving		

=== vs. South Carolina State ===
Game Eleven – South Carolina State Bulldogs (7–2) vs Morgan State Bears (5–5) – Game summary

Quarter	1	2	3	4	Total
Bulldogs	0	0	0	0	0
Bears	0	0	0	0	0

at Hughes Stadium • Baltimore, Maryland

- Date: Saturday November 16, 2024
- Game time: 4:00 p.m.
- Game weather: 0 °F (−18 °C)
- TV announcers (ESPN+): Lowell Galindo (play-by-play) and Fozzy Whittaker (analyst)

Game information

First quarter
Second quarter
Third quarter
Fourth quarter

Statistics	SCST	MORG
First downs		
Total yards		
Rushing yards		
Passing yards		
Passing: Comp–Att–Int		
Time of possession		

Team	Category	Player	Statistics
South Carolina State	Passing		
South Carolina State	Rushing		
South Carolina State	Receiving		
Morgan State	Passing		
Morgan State	Rushing		
Morgan State	Receiving		

=== vs. Howard ===
Game Twelve – Howard Bison (4–7) vs Morgan State Bears (5–6) – Game summary

Quarter	1	2	3	4	Total
Bison	0	0	0	0	0
Bears	0	0	0	0	0

at Hughes Stadium • Baltimore, Maryland

- Date: Saturday November 23, 2024
- Game time: 1:00 p.m.
- Game weather: 0 °F (−18 °C)
- TV: ESPN+

Game information

First quarter
Second quarter
Third quarter
Fourth quarter

Statistics	HOW	MORG
First downs		
Total yards		
Rushing yards		
Passing yards		
Passing: Comp–Att–Int		
Time of possession		

Team	Category	Player	Statistics
Howard	Passing		
Howard	Rushing		
Howard	Receiving		
Morgan State	Passing		
Morgan State	Rushing		
Morgan State	Receiving		
