= Truist Stadium =

Truist Stadium may refer to the following stadiums:

- Truist Arena, a basketball arena in Highland Heights, Kentucky, on the campus of Northern Kentucky University
- Truist Field, a baseball stadium in Charlotte, North Carolina, home of the Charlotte Knights (International League)
- Truist Park, a baseball stadium in Cumberland, Georgia, home of the Atlanta Braves (Major League Baseball)
- Truist Point, a baseball stadium in High Point, North Carolina, home of the High Point Rockers (Atlantic League)
- Truist Stadium (Winston-Salem), a baseball stadium in Winston-Salem, North Carolina, home of the Winston-Salem Dash (South Atlantic League)
- Truist Stadium (North Carolina A&T), a football stadium in Greensboro, North Carolina, on the campus of North Carolina A&T State University

== See also ==
- Truist Financial
