= 2024 New Hampshire Wildcats football team =

American college football season

2024 New Hampshire Wildcats football

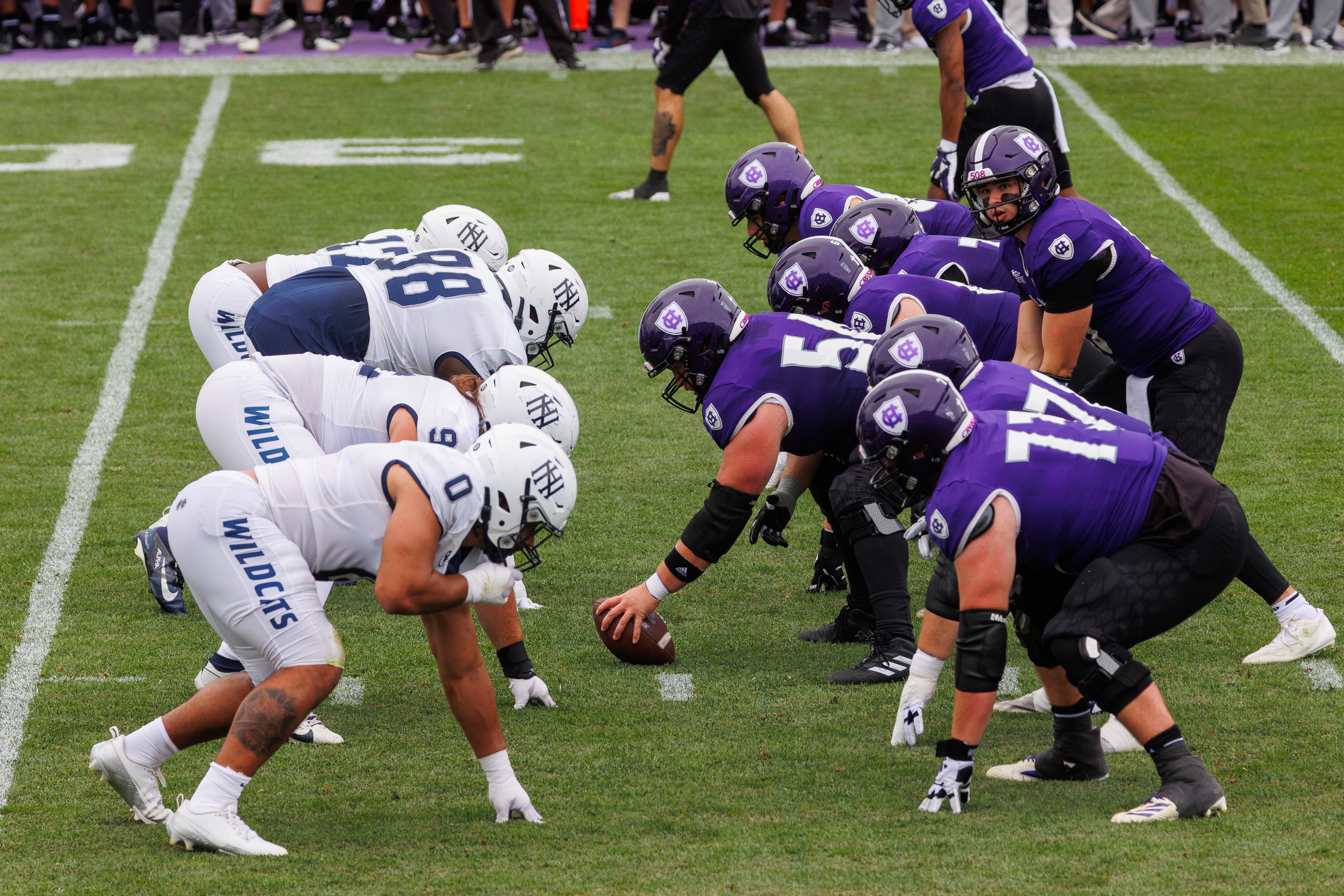
- The Wildcats defeated Holy Cross, 21–20

NCAA Division I First Round, L 10–41 vs. UT Martin
- Conference: CAA Football

Ranking
- STATS: No. 23
- FCS Coaches: No. 24
- Record: 8–5 (6–2 CAA)
- Head coach: Ricky Santos (4th season)
- Co-offensive coordinators: Ed Borden (1st season); Drew Belcher (1st season)
- Defensive coordinator: Garrett Gillick (3rd season)
- Home stadium: Wildcat Stadium

2024 Coastal Athletic Association Football Conference standings
	Conf.			Overall
Team	W		L	W		L
No. 15 Richmond +^	8	–	0	10	–	3
No. 9 Rhode Island* +^	7	–	1	11	–	3
No. 12 Villanova ^	6	–	2	10	–	4
Delaware*	6	–	2	9	–	2
No. 23 New Hampshire ^	6	–	2	8	–	5
Stony Brook	5	–	3	8	–	4
Towson	5	–	3	7	–	5
Elon	5	–	3	6	–	6
William & Mary	4	–	4	7	–	5
Monmouth	4	–	4	6	–	6
Maine	3	–	5	5	–	7
Albany	2	–	6	4	–	8
Hampton	2	–	6	5	–	7
Campbell	1	–	7	3	–	9
Bryant	0	–	8	2	–	10
North Carolina A&T	0	–	8	1	–	11
+ – Conference co-champions; ^ – FCS playoff participant; * Delaware ineligible for rankings and 2024 FCS playoffs due to transition to the FBS. Richmond and Rhode Island named co-champions as Rhode Island's only CAA loss was to Delaware.; Rankings from STATS Poll

The 2024 New Hampshire Wildcats football team represented the University of New Hampshire as a member of the Coastal Athletic Association Football Conference (CAA Football) in the 2024 NCAA Division I FCS football season. The Wildcats were led by fourth-year head coach Ricky Santos, (Note: Santos also served as interim-head coach for the 2019 season.) and played their home games at Wildcat Stadium.

After compiling a regular-season record of 8–4, 6–2 in CAA Football play, the Wildcats received an at-large selection to the NCAA Division I Playoffs—the Wildcats were selected to host a first-round game as the 16th seed in the 24-team field.

== Schedule ==
Date	Time	Opponent	Rank	Site	TV	Result	Attendance
August 29	7:00 p.m.	at UCF*		FBC Mortgage Stadium; Orlando, FL	ESPN+	L 3–57	44,206
September 7	2:00 p.m.	at Holy Cross*		Fitton Field; Worcester, MA	ESPN+	W 21–20	10,815
September 14	6:00 p.m.	Stonehill*		Wildcat Stadium; Durham, NH	FloSports	W 45–6	6,795
September 21	3:00 p.m.	Bryant		Wildcat Stadium; Durham, NH	FloSports	W 38–17	11,302
October 4	7:00 p.m.	at Harvard*	No. 21	Harvard Stadium; Boston, MA	ESPN+	L 23–28	8,676
October 12	2:00 p.m.	at Elon		Rhodes Stadium; Elon, NC	FloSports	W 17–10	4,315
October 19	1:00 p.m.	No. 16 Rhode Island^{†}	No. 24	Wildcat Stadium; Durham, NH	FloSports	L 9–26	8,425
October 26	3:30 p.m.	at No. 13 Villanova		Villanova Stadium; Villanova, PA	FloSports	L 6–14	5,015
November 2	1:00 p.m.	at Albany		Bob Ford Field; Albany, NY	FloSports	W 31–14	3,225
November 9	1:00 p.m.	Monmouth		Wildcat Stadium; Durham, NH	FloSports	W 33–20	5,108
November 16	1:00 p.m.	No. 16 Stony Brook		Wildcat Stadium; Durham, NH	FloSports	W 31–30	4,760
November 23	1:00 p.m.	at Maine	No. 24	Alfond Stadium; Orono, ME	FloSports	W 27–9	3,190
November 30	1:00 p.m.	No. 23 UT Martin*	No. 19	Wildcat Stadium; Durham, NH (NCAA Division I First Round)	ESPN+	L 10–41	1,573
*Non-conference game; ^{†}Homecoming; Rankings from STATS Poll released prior to the game; All times are in Eastern time

== Game summaries ==
=== at UCF (FBS) ===
Game One – New Hampshire Wildcats (0–0) vs UCF Knights (FBS) (0–0) – Game summary

Quarter	1	2	3	4	Total
Wildcats	0	3	0	0	3
Knights (FBS)	6	23	28	0	57

at FBC Mortgage Stadium • Orlando, FL

- Date: Thursday August 29, 2024
- Game time: 7:00 p.m.
- Game weather: 85 °F (29 °C), sunny
- Game attendance: 44,206
- Referee: Cravonne Barrett
- TV announcers (ESPN+): Robert Lee (play-by-play) and Rene Ingoglia (analyst)
- Preview · Box score

Game information

First quarter

- UCF: Colton Boomer 25-yard field goal, 10:55
- UCF: Colton Boomer 44-yard field goal, 4:56

Second quarter

- UCF: KJ Jefferson 3-yard run (Colton Boomer Kick), 14:45
- UCF: Safety, 13:12
- UCF: RJ Harvey 1-yard run (Colton Boomer Kick), 9:40
- NH: Nick Mazzie 38-yard field goal, 4:31
- UCF: RJ Harvey 13-yard run (Colton Boomer Kick), 0:43

Third quarter

- UCF: Myles Montgomery 49-yard pass from KJ Jefferson (Colton Boomer Kick), 9:15
- UCF: Peny Boone 59-yard run (Colton Boomer Kick), 6:39
- UCF: Johnny Richardson 22-yard pass pass from KJ Jefferson (Colton Boomer Kick), 3:05
- UCF: Myles Montgomery 25-yard run (Colton Boomer Kick), 1:28

Fourth quarter

- None

Statistics	UNH	UCF
First downs	9	27
Total yards	166	639
Rushing yards	71	454
Passing yards	95	185
Passing: Comp–Att–Int	14–28–2	11–22–1
Time of possession	30:27	29:33

Team	Category	Player	Statistics
New Hampshire	Passing	Seth Morgan	14/28, 95 yards, 2 INT
New Hampshire	Rushing	Matt Vezza	2 carries, 21 yards
New Hampshire	Receiving	Logan Tomlinson	6 receptions, 73 yards
UCF	Passing	KJ Jefferson	7/14, 164 yards, 2 TD, INT
UCF	Rushing	RJ Harvey	11 carries, 142 yards, 2 TD
UCF	Receiving	Kobe Hudson	2 receptions, 61 yards

=== at Holy Cross ===
Game Two – New Hampshire Wildcats (0–1) vs Holy Cross Crusaders (0–1) – Game summary

Quarter	1	2	3	4	Total
Wildcats	0	7	7	7	21
Crusaders	3	3	14	0	20

at Fitton Field • Worcester, MA

- Date: Saturday September 7, 2024
- Game time: 2:00 p.m.
- Game attendance: 10,815
- TV: ESPN+
- Box score

Game information

First quarter
Second quarter
Third quarter
Fourth quarter

Statistics	UNH	HC
First downs	16	15
Total yards	330	388
Rushing yards	172	87
Passing yards	158	301
Passing: Comp–Att–Int	17-22-1	19-29-1
Time of possession	26:52	33:08

Team	Category	Player	Statistics
New Hampshire	Passing	Seth Morgan	17/22, 158 yards, 2 TD, 1 INT
New Hampshire	Rushing	Isaac Seide	18 carries, 161 yards, 1 TD
New Hampshire	Receiving	Logan Tomlinson	8 receptions, 85 yards, 2 TD
Holy Cross	Passing	Joe Pesansky	19/29, 301 yards, 1 TD, 1 INT
Holy Cross	Rushing	Jordan Fuller	23 carries, 84 yards, 1 TD
Holy Cross	Receiving	Jacob Peterson	6 receptions, 110 yards, 1 TD

=== Stonehill ===
Game Three – Stonehill Skyhawks (0–1) vs New Hampshire Wildcats (1–1) – Game summary

Quarter	1	2	3	4	Total
Skyhawks	6	0	0	0	6
Wildcats	14	14	17	0	45

at Wildcat Stadium, Durham, NH

- Date: Saturday September 14, 2024
- Game time: 6:00 PM
- Game attendance: 6,795
- TV: FloSports
- Box score

Game information

First quarter
Second quarter
Third quarter
Fourth quarter

Statistics	STO	UNH
First downs	15	24
Total yards	252	541
Rushing yards	175	102
Passing yards	77	439
Passing: Comp–Att–Int	7-23-1	25-35-0
Time of possession	30:10	29:50

Team	Category	Player	Statistics
Stonehill	Passing	Ashur Carraha	7/23, 77 yards, 1 INT
Stonehill	Rushing	Ashur Carraha	10 carries, 71 yards
Stonehill	Receiving	Kyree Drake	1 reception, 34 yards
New Hampshire	Passing	Seth Morgan	22/30, 387 yards, 6 TD
New Hampshire	Rushing	Isaac Seide	16 carries, 54 yards
New Hampshire	Receiving	Caleb Burke	3 receptions, 134 yards, 2 TD

=== Bryant ===
Game Four – Bryant Bulldogs (1–2) vs New Hampshire Wildcats (2–1) – Game summary

Quarter	1	2	3	4	Total
Bulldogs	3	7	0	7	17
Wildcats	17	14	0	7	38

at Wildcat Stadium, Durham, NH

- Date: Saturday September 21, 2024
- Game time: 3:00 PM
- Game attendance: 11,302
- TV: FloSports
- Box score

Game information

First quarter
Second quarter
Third quarter
Fourth quarter

Statistics	BRY	UNH
First downs	20	19
Total yards	406	413
Rushing yards	70	99
Passing yards	336	314
Passing: Comp–Att–Int	26-46-0	23-30-0
Time of possession	31:40	28:20

Team	Category	Player	Statistics
Bryant	Passing	Jarret Guest	25/44, 335 yards, 1 TD
Bryant	Rushing	Fabrice Mukendi	8 carries, 59 yards
Bryant	Receiving	Landon Ruggieri	4 receptions, 118 yards, 1 TD
New Hampshire	Passing	Seth Morgan	23/30, 314 yards, 4 TD
New Hampshire	Rushing	Isaac Seide	6 carries, 61 yards, 1 TD
New Hampshire	Receiving	Caleb Burke	6 receptions, 151 yards, 2 TD

=== at Harvard ===
Game Five – No. 21 New Hampshire Wildcats (3–1) vs Harvard Crimson (1–1) – Game summary

Quarter	1	2	3	4	Total
No. 21 Wildcats	7	9	0	7	23
Crimson	0	14	7	7	28

at Harvard Stadium, Boston, MA

- Date: Friday October 4, 2024
- Game time: 7:00 PM
- Game weather: Cloudy • Temperature: 66 °F (19 °C) • Wind: S 5 mph
- Game attendance: 8,676
- Referee: Alex Parrella
- TV announcers (ESPN+): Alex Vispoli (play-by-play), Tyler Davey (analyst) and Amanda Keane (sideline)
- Box score

Game information

First quarter

- (6:39) UNH – Caleb Burke 14-yard pass from Seth Morgan, Nick Mazzie kick (Drive: 10 plays, 82 yards, 5:35; New Hampshire 7–0)

Second quarter

- (12:41) UNH – Nick Mazzie 52-yard field goal (Drive: 11 plays, 40 yards, 5:52; New Hampshire 10–0)
- (11:59) HAR – Scott Woods II 65-yard pass from Jaden Craig, Dylan Fingersh kick (Drive: 2 plays, 75 yards, 0:42; New Hampshire 10–7)
- (8:11) UNH – Nick Mazzie 29-yard field goal (Drive: 7 plays, 64 yards, 3:43; New Hampshire 13–7)
- (4:08) HAR – Xaviah Bascon 1-yard run, Kieran Corr kick (Drive: 3 plays, 54 yards, 1:07; Harvard 14–13)
- (0:00) UNH – Nick Mazzie 43-yard field goal (Drive: 10 plays, 69 yards, 1:57; New Hampshire 16–14)

Third quarter

- (5:11) HAR – Xaviah Bascon 1-yard run, Kieran Corr kick (Drive: 10 plays, 55 yards, 5:47; Harvard 21–16)

Fourth quarter

- (11:23) HAR – Charles DePrima 16-yard run, Kieran Corr kick (Drive: 9 plays, 58 yards, 4:20; Harvard 28–16)
- (5:54) UNH – Logan Tomlinson 3-yard pass from Seth Morgan, Nick Mazzie kick (Drive: 14 plays, 73 yards, 5:21; Harvard 28–23)

Statistics	UNH	HARV
First downs	20	17
Total yards	319	348
Rushing yards	46	144
Passing yards	273	204
Passing: Comp–Att–Int	35–48–0	10–23–0
Time of possession	30:38	29:22

Team	Category	Player	Statistics
New Hampshire	Passing	Seth Morgan	34/47, 267 yards, 2 TD
New Hampshire	Rushing	Isaac Seide	10 carries, 204 yards, TD
New Hampshire	Receiving	Logan Tomlinson	10 receptions, 105 yards, TD
Harvard	Passing	Jaden Craig	10/23, 204 yards, TD
Harvard	Rushing	Xaviah Bascon	16 carries, 66 yards, 2 TD
Harvard	Receiving	Scott Woods II	4 receptions, 93 yards, TD

=== at Elon ===
Game Six – New Hampshire Wildcats (3–2) vs Elon Phoenix (1–4) – Game summary

Quarter	1	2	3	4	Total
Wildcats	0	7	7	3	17
Phoenix	10	0	0	0	10

at Rhodes Stadium, Elon, NC

- Date: Saturday October 12, 2024
- Game time: 2:00 PM
- Game weather: Sunny • Temperature: 75 °F (24 °C) • Wind: W 5 mph
- Game attendance: 4,315
- Referee: Paul Matt Overton
- TV announcers (FloSports): Taylor Durham (play-by-play), Khirey Walker (analyst) and Hannah Bradley (sideline)
- Box score

Game information

First quarter

- (10:56) ELO – Jack Berkowitz 41-yard field goal (Drive: 7 plays, 51 yards, 4:04; Elon 3–0)
- (5:11) ELO – TJ Thomas Jr. 39-yard run, Jack Berkowitz kick (Drive: 6 plays, 77 yards, 2:40; Elon 10–0)

Second quarter

- (0:10) UNH – Logan Tomlinson 10-yard pass from Seth Morgan, Nick Mazzie kick (Drive: 1 play, 10 yards, 0:09; Elon 10–7)

Third quarter

- (8:13) UNH – Logan Tomlinson 4-yard run, Nick Mazzie kick (Drive: 6 plays, 52 yards, 3:47; New Hampshire 14–10)

Fourth quarter

- (14:06) UNH – Nick Mazzie 38-yard field goal (Drive: 12 plays, 57 yards, 7:05; New Hampshire 17–10)

Statistics	UNH	ELON
First downs	14	11
Total yards	158	231
Rushing yards	39	46
Passing yards	119	185
Passing: Comp–Att–Int	16–29–1	17–30–1
Time of possession	29:34	30:26

Team	Category	Player	Statistics
New Hampshire	Passing	Seth Morgan	16/29, 119 yards, TD, INT
New Hampshire	Rushing	Isaac Seide	20 carries, 51 yards
New Hampshire	Receiving	Joey Corcoran	5 receptions, 62 yards
Elon	Passing	Jack Salopek	17/29, 185 yards, INT
Elon	Rushing	TJ Thomas Jr.	9 carries, 78 yards, TD
Elon	Receiving	Chandler Brayboy	5 receptions, 72 yards

=== No. 16 Rhode Island ===
Game Seven – No. 16 Rhode Island Rams (5–1) at No. 24 New Hampshire Wildcats (4–2) – Game summary

Quarter	1	2	3	4	Total
No. 16 Rams	0	2	17	7	26
No. 24 Wildcats	0	3	0	6	9

at Wildcat Stadium, Durham, NH

- Date: Saturday October 19, 2024
- Game time: 1:00 p.m.
- Game weather: Sunny, 68 °F (20 °C)
- Game attendance: 8,425
- Referee: Henry Wimberg
- TV announcers (FloSports): Cooper Boardman (play-by-play) and Sean McDonnell (analyst)
- Box score

Game information

First quarter

- No scoring plays

Second quarter

- (9:27) URI – Team safety (Drive: 3 plays, 3 yards, 1:30; Rhode Island 2–0)
- (0:23) UNH – Nick Mazzie 45-yard field goal (Drive: 11 plays, 57 yards, 5:02; New Hampshire 3–2)

Third quarter

- (9:43) URI – Ty Groff 20-yard field goal (Drive: 8 plays, 45 yards, 3:40; Rhode Island 5–3)
- (6:33) URI – Freddie Camp 1-yard fumble return (Ty Groff kick) (Drive: 3 plays, 62 yards, 0:48; Rhode Island 12–3)
- (0:13) URI – Marquis Buchanan 57-yard pass from Devin Farrell (Ty Groff kick) (Drive: 7 plays, 85 yards, 2:59; Rhode Island 19–3)

Fourth quarter

- (4:02) URI – Tommy Smith 3-yard run (Ty Groff kick) (Drive: 3 plays, 25 yards, 1:24; Rhode Island 26–3)
- (0:29) UNH – Logan Tomlinson 13-yard pass from Matt Vezza (2-point pass conversion failed) (Drive: 12 plays, 67 yards, 3:26; Rhode Island 26–9)

Statistics	URI	UNH
First downs	12	14
Total yards	318	235
Rushing yards	171	20
Passing yards	147	215
Passing: Comp–Att–Int	10–23–1	28–42–1
Time of possession	30:37	29:23

Team	Category	Player	Statistics
Rhode Island	Passing	Devin Farrell	10/23, 147 yards, TD, INT
Rhode Island	Rushing	Malik Grant	25 carries, 127 yards
Rhode Island	Receiving	Marquis Buchanan	4 receptions, 62 yards, TD
New Hampshire	Passing	Seth Morgan	17/29, 131 yards, INT
New Hampshire	Rushing	Isaac Seide	17 carries, 39 yards
New Hampshire	Receiving	Logan Tomlinson	8 receptions, 57 yards, TD

=== at No. 13 Villanova ===
Game Eight – New Hampshire Wildcats (4–3) at No. 13 Villanova Wildcats (5–2) – Game summary

Quarter	1	2	3	4	Total
New Hampshire	3	0	0	3	6
No. 13 Villanova	0	7	0	7	14

at Villanova Stadium, Villanova, PA

- Date: Saturday October 26, 2024
- Game time: 3:30 p.m.
- Game attendance: 5,015
- TV: FloSports
- Box score

Game information

First quarter
Second quarter
Third quarter
Fourth quarter

Statistics	UNH	VILL
First downs		
Total yards		
Rushing yards		
Passing yards		
Passing: Comp–Att–Int		
Time of possession		

Team	Category	Player	Statistics
New Hampshire	Passing		
New Hampshire	Rushing		
New Hampshire	Receiving		
Villanova	Passing		
Villanova	Rushing		
Villanova	Receiving		

=== at Albany ===
Game Nine – New Hampshire Wildcats (4–4) at Albany Great Danes (3–5) – Game summary

Quarter	1	2	3	4	Total
Wildcats	14	10	0	7	31
Great Danes	0	0	0	14	14

at Bob Ford Field, Albany, NY

- Date: Saturday November 2, 2024
- Game time: 1:00 p.m.
- Game weather: Cloudy 50 °F (10 °C) · Wind: South 8 mph (13 km/h)
- Game attendance: 3,225
- TV: FloSports
- Box score

Game information

First quarter
Second quarter
Third quarter
Fourth quarter

Statistics	UNH	ALB
First downs		
Total yards		
Rushing yards		
Passing yards		
Passing: Comp–Att–Int		
Time of possession		

Team	Category	Player	Statistics
New Hampshire	Passing		
New Hampshire	Rushing		
New Hampshire	Receiving		
Albany	Passing		
Albany	Rushing		
Albany	Receiving		

=== Monmouth ===
Game Ten – Monmouth Hawks (4–5) at New Hampshire Wildcats (5–4) – Game summary

Quarter	1	2	3	4	Total
Hawks	0	14	0	6	20
Wildcats	7	13	10	3	33

at Wildcat Stadium • Durham, NH

- Date: Saturday November 9, 2024
- Game time: 1:00 PM EST
- Game weather: Sunny, 48 °F (9 °C)
- Game attendance: 5,108
- Referee: Henry Wimberg
- TV announcers (FloSports): Joe Well (play-by-play) and Evan Gray (analyst)
- Box score

Game information

First quarter

- (08:57) UNH – Colby Ramshaw 5-yard pass from Seth Morgan (Nick Mazzie kick) (Drive: 10 plays, 57 yards, 4:44; New Hampshire 7-0)

Second quarter

- (14:32) MONM – TJ Speight 36-yard pass from Derek Robertson (Michael Calton Jr. kick) (Drive: 6 plays, 69 yards, 2:19; 7-7)
- (13:21) UNH – Logan Tomlinson 5-yard pass from Seth Morgan (Nick Mazzie kick) (Drive: 2 plays, 5 yards, 0:07; New Hampshire 14-7)
- (10:13) MONM – Sone Ntoh 19-yard run (Michael Calton Jr. kick) (Drive: 4 plays, 28 yards, 1:40; 14-14)
- (05:25) UNH – Nick Mazzie 42-yard field goal (Drive: 10 plays, 45 yards, 4:45; New Hampshire 17-14)
- (00:20) UNH – Nick Mazzie 35-yard field goal (Drive: 12 plays, 52 yards, 1:33; New Hampshire 20-14)

Third quarter

- (07:07) UNH – Nick Mazzie 35-yard field goal (Drive: 13 plays, 57 yards, 7:49; New Hampshire 23-14)
- (00:14) UNH – Denzell Gibson 11-yard run (Nick Mazzie kick) (Drive: 5 plays, 27 yards, 2:42; New Hampshire 30-14)

Fourth quarter

- (12:12) MONM – Tra Neal 8-yard pass from Derek Robertson (Two-point pass conversion failed) (Drive: 12 plays, 70 yards, 2:56; Monmouth 30-20)
- (05:02) UNH – Nick Mazzie 31-yard field goal (Drive: 15 plays, 39 yards, 7:10; New Hampshire 33-20)

Statistics	MONM	UNH
First downs	14	24
Total yards	313	335
Rushing yards	115	130
Passing yards	198	205
Passing: Comp–Att–Int	17–34–0	25–41–0
Time of possession	18:23	41:37

Team	Category	Player	Statistics
Monmouth	Passing	Derek Robertson	17/34, 198 yards, 2 TD
Monmouth	Rushing	Sone Ntoh	5 carries, 54 yards, TD
Monmouth	Receiving	TJ Speight	3 receptions, 60 yards, TD
New Hampshire	Passing	Seth Morgan	25/40, 205 yards, 2 TD
New Hampshire	Rushing	Denzell Gibson	16 receptions, 88 yards, TD
New Hampshire	Receiving	Logan Tomlinson	10 receptions, 115 yards, TD

=== No. 16 Stony Brook ===
Game Eleven – No. 16 Stony Brook Seawolves (8–2) vs New Hampshire Wildcats (6–4) – Game summary

Quarter	1	2	3	4	Total
No. 16 Seawolves	3	10	10	7	30
Wildcats	0	10	0	21	31

at Wildcat Stadium, Durham, NH

- Date: Saturday November 16, 2024
- Game time: 1:00 PM EST
- Game weather: Sunny, 55 °F (13 °C)
- Game attendance: 4,760
- Referee: Tom Zetts
- TV announcers (FloSports): Joel Wiel (play-by-play) and Evan Gray (analyst)
- Box score

Game information

First quarter

- (4:08) SBU – Enda Kirby 24-yard field goal (Drive: 6 plays, 19 yards, 1:35; Stony Brook 3–0)

Second quarter

- (14:54) SBU – Enda Kirby 22-yard field goal (Drive: 4 plays, 4 yards, 1:13; Stony Brook 6–0)
- (11:06) UNH – Logan Tomlinson 5-yard pass from Seth Morgan, Nick Mazzie kick (Drive: 7 plays, 60 yards, 3:39; New Hampshire 7–6)
- (9:42) SBU – Jayce Freeman 30-yard pass from Tyler Knoop, Enda Kirby kick (Drive: 4 plays, 75 yards, 1:24; Stony Brook 13–7)
- (0:22) UNH – Nick Mazzie 22-yard field goal (Drive: 7 plays, 46 yards, 1:20; Stony Brook 13–10)

Third quarter

- (10:24) SBU – Cal Redman 14-yard pass from Tyler Knoop, Enda Kirby kick (Drive: 11 plays, 61 yards, 4:30; Stony Brook 20–10)
- (5:49) SBU – Enda Kirby 37-yard field goal (Drive: 10 plays, 41 yards, 3:02; Stony Brook 23–10)

Fourth quarter

- (14:56) SBU – Cole Bunicci 13-yard pass from Tyler Knoop, Enda Kirby kick (Drive: 9 plays, 67 yards, 4:01; Stony Brook 30–10)
- (12:24) UNH – Seth Morgan 24-yard run, Nick Mazzie kick (Drive: 8 plays, 55 yards, 2:26; Stony Brook 30–17)
- (9:37) UNH – Denzell Gibson 2-yard run, Nick Mazzie kick (Drive: 5 plays, 13 yards, 1:28; Stony Brook 30–24)
- (6:15) UNH – Joey Corcoran 15-yard pass from Seth Morgan kick, Nick Mazzie kick (Drive: 3 plays, 53 yards, 1:28; New Hampshire 31–30)

Statistics	STBK	UNH
First downs	17	21
Total yards	326	326
Rushing yards	132	63
Passing yards	194	263
Passing: Comp–Att–Int	17–27–0	27–40–1
Time of possession	24:55	35:05

Team	Category	Player	Statistics
Stony Brook	Passing	Tyler Knoop	17/27, 194 yards, 3 TD
Stony Brook	Rushing	Roland Dempster	21 carries, 85 yards
Stony Brook	Receiving	Cal Redman	5 receptions, 66 yards, TD
New Hampshire	Passing	Seth Morgan	27/40, 263 yards, 2 TD, INT
New Hampshire	Rushing	Denzell Gibson	17 carries, 64 yards, TD
New Hampshire	Receiving	Caleb Burke	6 receptions, 74 yards

=== at Maine (Battle for the Brice–Cowell Musket) ===
Game Twelve – New Hampshire Wildcats (7–4) at Maine Black Bears (5–6) – Game summary

Quarter	1	2	3	4	Total
Wildcats	0	7	10	10	27
Black Bears	9	0	0	0	9

at Alfond Sports Stadium • Orono, ME

- Date: Saturday November 23, 2024
- Game time: 1:00 PM EST
- Game weather: Rain
- Game attendance: 3,190
- Referee: Antonio Marcella
- TV: FloSports
- Box score

Game information

First quarter

- (3:56) ME – Joey Bryson 39-yard field goal (Drive: 9 plays, 59 yards, 5:00; Maine 3–0)
- (0:40) ME – Montigo Moss 8-yard pass from Carter Peevy (Drive: 6 plays, 16 yards, 2:26; Maine 9–0)

Second quarter

- (0:11) UNH – Denzell Gibson 1-yard run, Nick Mazzie kick (Drive: 13 plays, 81 yards, 6:08; Maine 9–7)

Third quarter

- (14:44) UNH – Caleb Mead 57-yard run, Nick Mazzie kick (Drive: 1 play, 57 yards, 0:10; New Hampshire 14–9)
- (2:02) UNH – Nick Mazzie 21-yard field goal (Drive: 15 plays, 52 yards, 7:18; New Hampshire 17–9)

Fourth quarter

- (11:45) UNH – Nick Mazzie 22-yard field goal (Drive: 8 plays, 29 yards, 3:51; New Hampshire 20–9)
- (2:03) UNH – Seth Morgan 7-yard run, Nick Mazzie kick (Drive: 1 play, 7 yards, 0:06; New Hampshire 27–9)

Statistics	UNH	ME
First downs	19	8
Total yards	286	198
Rushing yards	122	30
Passing yards	164	168
Passing: Comp–Att–Int	22–34–1	12–26–0
Time of possession	39:11	20:43

Team	Category	Player	Statistics
New Hampshire	Passing	Seth Morgan	22/34, 164 yards, INT
New Hampshire	Rushing	Caleb Mead	19 carries, 118 yards, TD
New Hampshire	Receiving	Logan Perez	3 receptions, 41 yards
Maine	Passing	Carter Peevy	12/25, 168 yards, TD
Maine	Rushing	Carter Peevy	7 carries, 43 yards
Maine	Receiving	Trevin Ewing	1 reception, 64 yards

=== No. 23 UT Martin (NCAA Division I Playoffs–First Round) ===
No. 23 UT Martin Skyhawks (8–4) at No. 19 New Hampshire Wildcats (8–4) – Game summary

Quarter	1	2	3	4	Total
No. 23 Skyhawks	7	20	0	14	41
No. 19 Wildcats	7	0	3	0	10

at Wildcat Stadium • Durham, NH

- Date: Saturday November 30, 2024
- Game time: 1:00 PM EST
- Game weather: Sunny, 39 °F (4 °C)
- Game attendance: 1,573
- Referee: Travis Barta
- TV announcers (ESPN+): Robert Lee (play-by-play) and Marcus Ray (analyst)
- Box score

Game information

First quarter

- (6:59) UTM – Rashad Raymond 4 yard run, Jaren Van Winkle kick (Drive: 12 plays, 62 yards, 5:44; UTM 7–0)
- (6:45) UNH – Caleb Mead 95 yard kickoff return, Nick Mazzie kick (TIED 7–7)

Second quarter

- (13:50) UTM – Jaren Van Winkle 30 yard field goal (Drive: 7 plays, 22 yards, 3:27; UTM 10–7)
- (10:38) UTM – Patrick Smith 3 yard run, Jaren Van Winkle kick (Drive: 6 plays, 81 yards, 2:51; UTM 17–7)
- (2:36) UTM – Kinkead Dent 2 yard run, Jaren Van Winkle kick (Drive: 8 plays, 80 yards, 3:33; UTM 24–7)
- (0:13) UTM – Jaren Van Winkle 36 yard field goal (Drive: 6 plays, 45 yards, 1:30; UTM 27–7)

Third quarter

- (6:42) UNH – Nick Mazzie 41 yard field goal (Drive: 10 plays, 40 yards, 4:20; UTM 27–10)

Fourth quarter

- (12:46) UTM – Trevonte Rucker 4 yard run, Jaren Van Winkle kick (Drive: 6 plays, 39 yards, 3:41; UTM 34–10)
- (7:07) UTM – Glover Cook III 1 yard run, Jaren Van Winkle kick (Drive: 6 plays, 41 yards, 3:33; UTM 41–10)

Statistics	UTM	UNH
First downs	22	6
Total yards	482	124
Rushing yards	236	53
Passing yards	246	71
Passing: Comp–Att–Int	17-27-0	1-35-1
Time of possession	40:14	19:46

Team	Category	Player	Statistics
UT Martin	Passing	Kinkead Dent	17/26, 246 yards
UT Martin	Rushing	Patrick Smith	15 carries, 71 yards, 1 TD
UT Martin	Receiving	Trevonte Rucker	9 receptions, 88 yards
New Hampshire	Passing	Seth Morgan	14/35, 71 yards, 1 INT
New Hampshire	Rushing	Caleb Mead	5 carries, 36 yards
New Hampshire	Receiving	Caleb Burke	3 receptions, 23 yards
