= 2024 Lehigh Mountain Hawks football team =

American college football season

2024 Lehigh Mountain Hawks football

Patriot League co-champion

NCAA Division I Second Round, L 13–34 at Idaho
- Conference: Patriot League

Ranking
- STATS: No. 20
- FCS Coaches: No. 21
- Record: 9–4 (5–1 Patriot)
- Head coach: Kevin Cahill (2nd season)
- Offensive coordinator: Dan Hunt (2nd season)
- Defensive coordinator: Rich Nagy (2nd season)
- Home stadium: Goodman Stadium

Uniform
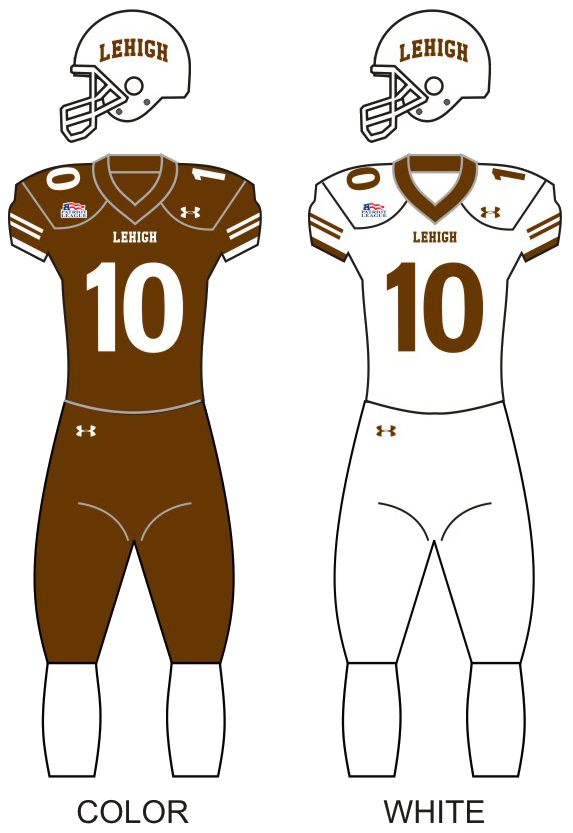

2024 Patriot League football standings
	Conf.			Overall
Team	W		L	W		L
No. 20 Lehigh +^	5	–	1	9	–	4
Holy Cross +	5	–	1	6	–	6
Bucknell	4	–	2	6	–	6
Lafayette	2	–	4	6	–	6
Georgetown	2	–	4	5	–	6
Fordham	2	–	4	2	–	10
Colgate	1	–	5	2	–	10
+ – Conference co-champions; ^ – FCS playoff participant; Rankings from STATS Poll

The 2024 Lehigh Mountain Hawks football team represented Lehigh University as a member of the Patriot League during the 2024 NCAA Division I FCS football season. The Mountain Hawks were led by second-year head coach Kevin Cahill and played home games at Goodman Stadium in Lower Saucon, Pennsylvania.

== Preseason ==
In Lehigh's previous season, the Mountain Hawks' roster was very senior heavy, with most of the team's starting players graduating. As such there is an equally large oncoming group of Freshmen, including two quarterbacks Matt Machalik of Palmerton and Hayden Johnson of Manheim Township, as well as senior QB Matt Rauscher and fifth-year QB Dante Perri. Additionally, coach Cahill has highlighted the new freshmen defenders, including Broc Bender, second-team all-state linebacker from Fork Union Military Academy in Virginia.

== Schedule ==
Date	Time	Opponent	Site	TV	Result	Attendance
August 30	6:00 p.m.	at Army*	Michie Stadium; West Point, NY	CBSSN	L 7–42	23,760
September 7	12:00 p.m.	Wagner*	Goodman Stadium; Lower Saucon, PA	ESPN+	W 49–13	2,920
September 14	12:00 p.m.	at LIU*	Bethpage Federal Credit Union Stadium; Brookville, NY	NEC Front Row	W 20–17	1,643
September 21	12:00 p.m.	Princeton*^{†}	Goodman Stadium; Lower Saucon, PA	ESPN+	W 35–20	6,217
September 28	12:00 p.m.	Bucknell	Goodman Stadium; Lower Saucon, PA	ESPN+	L 35–38 ^{2OT}	4,003
October 19	12:00 p.m.	at Yale*	Yale Bowl; New Haven, CT (Yank Townsend Trophy)	ESPN+	L 23–38	4,307
October 26	12:00 p.m.	Fordham	Goodman Stadium; Lower Saucon, PA	ESPN+	W 33–19	3,428
November 2	12:30 p.m.	at Georgetown	Cooper Field; Washington, DC	ESPN+	W 43–6	3,799
November 9	12:00 p.m.	at Holy Cross	Fitton Field; Worcester, MA	ESPN+	W 10–7	12,910
November 16	12:00 p.m.	Colgate	Goodman Stadium; Lower Saucon, PA	ESPN+	W 45–17	3,321
November 23	12:00 p.m.	Lafayette	Goodman Stadium; Lower Saucon, PA (The Rivalry)	ESPN+	W 38–14	15,097
November 30	2:00 p.m.	at No. 9 Richmond*	E. Claiborne Robins Stadium; Richmond, VA (NCAA Division I First Round)	ESPN+	W 20–16	3,220
December 7	9:00 p.m.	at No. 8 Idaho*	Kibbie Dome; Moscow, ID (NCAA Division I Second Round)	ESPN+	L 13–34	7,346
*Non-conference game; ^{†}Homecoming; Rankings from STATS Poll released prior to the game; All times are in Eastern time

== Game summaries ==
=== at Army (FBS) ===
Game One – Lehigh Mountain Hawks (0-0) at Army Black Knights (FBS) (0-0) – Game summary

Quarter	1	2	3	4	Total
Mountain Hawks	7	0	0	0	7
Black Knights (FBS)	7	14	7	14	42

at Michie Stadium • West Point, New York

- Date: August 30
- Game time: 6:00 p.m. EST/3:00 p.m. PST
- Game weather: Clear • Temperature: 69 °F (21 °C) • Wind: N at 2 miles per hour (3.2 km/h)
- Game attendance: 23,760
- Referee: Dan Scanlan
- TV announcers (CBSSN): Dave Ryan (play-by-play), Adam Breneman (analyst), Tina Cervasio (sideline reporter)

Game information

First quarter

- (5:57) ARMY – Bryson Daily 1-yard run, Trey Gronotte kick (Drive: 9 plays, 80 yards, 4:55; Army 7–0)
- (0:43) LEH – Luke Yoder 18-yard run, Nick Garrido kick (Drive: 9 plays, 75 yards, 5:14; Tied 7–7)

Second quarter

- (10:21) ARMY – Bryson Daily 1-yard run, Trey Gronotte kick (Drive: 13 plays, 76 yards, 5:17; Army 14–7)
- (2:59) ARMY – Kanye Udoh 13-yard run, Trey Gronotte kick (Drive: 10 plays, 79 yards, 6:15; Army 21–7)

Third quarter

- (8:32) ARMY – Noah Short 3-yard run, Trey Gronotte kick (Drive: 10 plays, 77 yards, 6:20; Army 28–7)

Fourth quarter

- (8:28) ARMY – Kanye Udoh 1-yard run, Trey Gronotte kick (Drive: 12 plays, 80 yards, 6:51; Army 35–7)
- (0:19) ARMY – Jake Rendina 3-yard run, Trey Gronotte kick (Drive: 8 plays, 56 yards, 2:50; Army 42–7)

Statistics	LEH	ARMY
First downs	16	26
Total yards	282	432
Rushing yards	172	375
Passing yards	110	57
Passing: Comp–Att–Int	10-19-2	5-8-0
Time of possession	26:56	33:04

Team	Category	Player	Statistics
Lehigh	Passing	Dante Perri	6/11, 64 yards
Lehigh	Rushing	Luke Yoder	10 carries, 51 yards, 1 TD
Lehigh	Receiving	Mason Humphrey	5 receptions, 61 yards
Army	Passing	Bryson Daily	3/6, 35 yards
Army	Rushing	Noah Short	8 carries, 83 yards, 1 TD
Army	Receiving	Casey Reynolds/Cam Schurr	1 reception, 22 yards

The season opener and the first time that the teams have met since 1995 and the first time Lehigh has played an FBS team since 2018. In the opening drive the Black Knights performed a 35-yard fake punt followed by a 1-yard touchdown by Bryson Daily. The Mountain Hawks responded the next drive by scoring in a seven-play drive off an 18-yard rushing touchdown by Luke Yoder. However, Army then scored on back to back drives with rushing touchdowns from Daily and Kanye Udoh and hold Lehigh scoreless, making it 21–7 at the half. Army scored early in the third with a 3-yard run from Noah Short, and scored twice in the fourth quarter to finish the game 42–7. Army held Lehigh scoreless in the second half, mostly due to two interceptions by Lehigh quarterback Hayden Johnson deep in Army territory. Lehigh had three quarterbacks take snaps in an effort to confuse Army, with Dante Perri, Matt Machalik and Hayden Johnson all being used in different packages.

=== Wagner ===
Game Two – Wagner Seahawks (1-0) at Lehigh Mountain Hawks (0-1) – Game summary

Quarter	1	2	3	4	Total
Seahawks	0	0	6	7	13
Mountain Hawks	21	21	7	0	49

at Goodman Stadium • Lower Saucon Township, Pennsylvania

- Date: September 7
- Game time: 12:00 p.m. EST/9:00 a.m. PST
- Game weather: Sunny
- Game attendance: 2,920
- Referee: Henry Wimberg
- TV announcers (ESPN+): TBD

Game information

First quarter

- (8:59) LEH – Geoffrey Jamiel 16-yard pass from Dante Perri, Nick Garrido Kick (Drive: 3 plays, 17 yards, 1:28, Lehigh 7-0)
- (8:22) LEH – Jaden Green 6-yard run, Nick Garrido Kick (Drive: 1 play, 6 yards, 0:05, Lehigh 14-0)
- (3:52) LEH – Luke Yoder 11-yard run, Nick Garrido Kick (Drive: 6 plays, 36 yards, 2:53, Lehigh 21-0)

Second quarter

- (7:25) LEH – Hayden Johnson 45-yard run, Nick Garrido Kick (Drive: 6 plays, 80 yards, 3:21, Lehigh 28-0)
- (1:03) LEH – Dante Perri 2-yard run, Nick Garrido Kick (Drive: 6 plays, 24 yards, 3:30, Lehigh 35-0)
- (0:48) LEH – Nick Peltekian 27-yard Interception Return, Canaan Kimball Kick (Drive: 1 play, 76 yards, 0:08, Lehigh 42-0)

Third quarter

- (13:22) LEH – Mason Humphrey 37-yard pass from Dante Perri , Nick Garrido Kick (Drive: 3 plays, 44 yards, 1:28, Lehigh 49-0)
- (7:09) WAG – Rickey Spruill 11-yard pass from Damien Mazil, Ryan Liszner PAT failed (Drive: 12 plays, 62 yards, 6:06, Lehigh 49-6)

Fourth quarter

- (2:58) WAG – Jaylen Bonelli 14-yard pass from Damien Mazil, Ryan Liszner Kick (Drive: 12 plays, 77 yards, 6:44, Lehigh 49-13)

Statistics	WAG	LEH
First downs	18	15
Total yards	249	274
Rushing yards	95	190
Passing yards	154	84
Passing: Comp–Att–Int	18-32-3	6-8-0
Time of possession	31:00	29:00

Team	Category	Player	Statistics
Wagner	Passing	Damien Mazil	18/31, 154 yards, 2 TD, 3 INT
Wagner	Rushing	Sekou Kamau	14 carries, 55 yards
Wagner	Receiving	Jaylen Bonelli	5 receptions, 54 yards, TD
Lehigh	Passing	Dante Perri	6/8, 84 yards, 2 TD
Lehigh	Rushing	Luke Yoder	9 carries, 64 yards, TD
Lehigh	Receiving	Mason Humphrey	2 receptions, 43 yards, TD

Seeking to bounce back from their defeat by Army, Lehigh started their home opener by scoring first off a 16-yard pass from Dante Perri to wide receiver Geoffrey Jamiel, following with two more touchdowns to take a 21–0 lead only 5 minutes into the game. The Mountain Hawks continued their strong start with first-year Hayden Johnson scoring his first collegiate touchdown for a 28–0 lead, followed by two more touchdowns by Lehigh to make it 42–0 at the half. This is the first time that Lehigh scored 42 points before halftime since their 2016 season against Yale. Lehigh scored again to start the third quarter to make the lead 49–0 before the Seahawks scored two late touchdowns to finish the game. Wagner had three turnovers, including a pick-six, finishing the game with 249 yards of total offense. This was Lehigh's largest margin of victory in 17 years, since its 2007 45–0 win against Georgetown, and the most points scored since its 2018 season against Bucknell. Junior receiver Geoffrey Jamiel put him over 100 career receptions and 1,000 receiving yards during the game, while juniors Tyler Ochojski and Matt Spatny secured Lehigh's first two sacks of the season. Junior defensive back Nick Peltekian said “This should be the standard for this team every week.” The game was also head coach Kevin Cahill's first ever home win.

=== at LIU ===
Game Three – Lehigh Mountain Hawks (1-1) at Long Island University Sharks (0-2) – Game summary

Quarter	1	2	3	4	Total
Mountain Hawks	0	13	7	0	20
Sharks	7	0	10	0	17

at Bethpage Federal Credit Union Stadium • Brookville, New York

- Date: September 14
- Game time: 12:00 p.m. EST/9:00 a.m. PST
- Game weather: Sunny • Temperature: 80 °F (27 °C)
- Game attendance: 1,643
- Referee: Travis Barta
- TV announcers (NEC Front Row): TBD

Game information

First quarter

- (2:31) LIU – Luca Stanzani 13-yard pass to Michael Love, Michael Coney kick (Drive: 9 plays, 72 yards, 5:09; LIU 7-0)

Second quarter

- (14:49) LEH – Luke Yoder 10-yard run, Nick Garrido Kick (Drive: 6 plays, 65 yards, 2:33; TIED 7-7)
- (0:12) LEH – Hayden Johnson 7-yard pass to Geoffrey Jamiel , Nick Garrido PAT failed (Drive: 16 plays, 67 yards, 8:40; Lehigh 13-7)

Third quarter

- (10:00) LIU – Luca Stanzani 3-yard pass to Michael Love, Michael Coney kick (Drive: 7 plays, 55 yards, 3:16 LIU 14-13)
- (5:42) LEH – Dante Perri 27-yard pass to Mason Humphrey Nick Garrido kick (Drive: 5 plays, 55 yards, 2:28; Lehigh 20-14)
- (0:37) LIU – Michael Coney 27-yard kick (Drive: 11 plays, 65 yards, 5:05; Lehigh 20-17)

Fourth quarter

No scoring

Statistics	LEH	LIU
First downs	20	15
Total yards	282	320
Rushing yards	143	166
Passing yards	139	154
Passing: Comp–Att–Int	10–18–0	16–26–1
Time of possession	33:55	26:05

Team	Category	Player	Statistics
Lehigh	Passing	Dante Perri	6/14, 113 yards, TD
Lehigh	Rushing	Luke Yoder	23 carries, 94 yards, TD
Lehigh	Receiving	Logan Galletta	2 receptions, 47 yards
LIU	Passing	Luca Stanzani	16/26, 160 yards, 2 TD, INT
LIU	Rushing	Ethan Greenwood	5 carries, 65 yards
LIU	Receiving	Cory Nichols	7 receptions, 52 yards, 2 TD

LIU was looking to come back from two losses with a home-opener against Lehigh, with this being the first time Lehigh traveled to LIU. The LIU sharks opened scoring with a 13-yard pass from Luca Stanzani to Michael Love before the Mountain Hawks tied with a Luke Yoder rushing touchdown. First-year quarterback Hayden Johnson then had his first career touchdown pass to junior wide receiver Geoffrey Jamiel. The Sharks opened up the second half with a Stanzani 3-yard passing touchdown to Michael Love then with 37 seconds left in the third LIU's kicker Michael Coney made a field goal. Lehigh held the game scoreless in the fourth quarter, with the game coming down to the Mountain Hawks' Will Parton stopping a fourth-and-2 attempt with 57 seconds left to preserve the win. This was the first time that Lehigh won back-to-back games since 2021, and are now 7-0 all time against the Sharks.

=== Princeton ===
Game Four – Princeton Tigers (0-0) at Lehigh Mountain Hawks (2-1) – Game summary

Quarter	1	2	3	4	Total
Tigers	7	0	7	6	20
Mountain Hawks	7	14	0	14	35

at Goodman Stadium • Lower Saucon Township, Pennsylvania

- Date: September 21
- Game time: 12:00 p.m. EST/9:00 a.m. PST
- Game attendance: 6,217
- TV announcers (ESPN+): TBD

Game information

First quarter

- (9:04) LEH – Luke Yoder 20-yard run, Nick Garrido Kick (Drive: 3 plays, 39 yards, 1:24; Lehigh 7-0)
- (5:50) PRI – John Volker 3-yard run, Sam Massick Kick (Drive: 8 plays, 75 yards, 3:14; Tied 7-7)

Second quarter

- (8:54) LEH – Jaden Green 11-yard run, Nick Garrido Kick (Drive: 7 plays, 72 yards, 4:00; Lehigh 14-7)
- (5:40) LEH – Luke Yoder 1-yard run, Nick Garrido Kick (Drive: 3 plays, 50 yards, 1:35; Lehigh 21-7)

Third quarter

- (10:34) PRI – Blaine Hipa 36-yard pass to Luke Colella, Sam Massick Kick (Drive: 11 plays, 79 yards, 4:19; Lehigh 21-14)

Fourth quarter

- (14:10) LEH – Hayden Johnson 17-yard pass to Geoffrey Jamiel, Nick Garrido Kick (Drive: 12 plays, 69 yards, 6:59; Lehigh 28-14)
- (9:54) PRI – Blaine Hipa 3-yard pass to Tyler Picinic, 2-point conversion failed (Drive: 12 plays, 75 yards, 4:16; Lehigh 28-20)
- (6:49) LEH – Jaden Green 34-yard run, Nick Garrido Kick (Drive: 5 plays. 71 yards, 2:58; Lehigh 35-20)

Statistics	PRIN	LEH
First downs	14	17
Total yards	212	346
Rushing yards	-7	153
Passing yards	219	193
Passing: Comp–Att–Int	16-22-3	16-40-0
Time of possession	25:29	34:31

Team	Category	Player	Statistics
Princeton	Passing	Blaine Hipa	16/38, 219, 2 TD, 3 INT
Princeton	Rushing	John Volker	10 carries, 28 yards, TD
Princeton	Receiving	Luke Colella	5 receptions, 86 yards, TD
Lehigh	Passing	Hayden Johnson	12/13, 165 yards, TD
Lehigh	Rushing	Jaden Green	18 carries, 82 yards, 2 TD
Lehigh	Receiving	Dylan McFadden	2 receptions, 62 yards

Lehigh hosted Princeton for its "Parents Weekend" homecoming game. This was Princeton's first game of the season. Both teams' marching bands put on special halftime performances, and food-trucks provided food to the homecoming crowd. Lehigh opened up the scoring with a 20-yard run up the middle by sophomore running back Luke Yoder six minutes into the game. Princeton responded tying the game to end the first quarter. The Mountain Hawks would outscore Princeton by 14 points in the 2nd quarter to make it 21-7 going into the second half. The Tigers scored on their opening possession of the second half and cut the lead to just 7 points. The fourth quarter started off with Johnson finding an open Geoffrey Jamiel on a 17-yard passing touchdown to put Lehigh's lead back to 14 points with 14:10 remaining in the game. Princeton got the ball back with 1:54 remaining with a chance to have a game-winning drive, however, Brycen Edwards intercepted Blaine Hipa to secure the win for Lehigh. The Tigers responded six minutes later with a touchdown of their own, but failed to convert the two-point conversion. This was the first time that Lehigh beat an ivy league school since 2016. Hayden Johnson had the best day of his career to date, going 12-of-13 while throwing for 165 yards with one touchdown. Lehigh also started Dante Perri who was 4-of-9 and finished with 28 yards.

=== Bucknell ===
Game Five – Bucknell Bison (2-2) at Lehigh Mountain Hawks (3-1) – Game summary

Quarter	1	2	3	4	OT	2OT	Total
Bison	0	14	7	7	7	3	38
Mountain Hawks	7	7	7	7	7	0	35

at Goodman Stadium • Lower Saucon Township, Pennsylvania

- Date: September 28
- Game time: 12:00 p.m. EST/9:00 a.m. PST
- Game attendance: 4,003
- TV announcers (ESPN+): TBD

Game information

First quarter

- LEH - Geoffrey Jamiel 23 yard pass from Dante Perri, Nick Garrido Kick (Lehigh 7-0)

Second quarter

- LEH - Geoffrey Jamiel 34 yard pass from Hayden Johnson, Nick Garrido Kick (Lehigh 14-0)
- BUC - TJ Cadden 100 yard kickoff return, Matt Schearer Kick (Lehigh 14-7)
- BUC - Eric Weatherly 31 yard pass from Ralph Rucker IV, Matt Schearer Kick (Tied 14-14)

Third quarter

- LEH - Luke Yoder 19 yard run, Nick Garrido Kick (Lehigh 21-14)
- BUC - Ralph Rucker IV 7 yard run, Matt Schearer Kick (Tied 21-21)

Fourth quarter

- BUC - Aaron Davis 79 yard interception return, Matt Schearer Kick (Bucknell 28-21)
- LEH - Luke Yoder 1 yard run, Nick Garrido Kick (Tied 28-28)

Overtime

- LEH - Luke Yoder 11 yard run, Nick Garrido Kick (Lehigh 35-28)
- BUC - Eric Weatherly 12 yard pass from Ralph Rucker IV, Matt Schearer Kick (Tied 35-35)

2nd Overtime

- BUC - Matt Schearer 42 yard field goal (Bucknell 38-35)

Statistics	BUCK	LEH
First downs	16	26
Total yards	270	500
Rushing yards	120	202
Passing yards	150	298
Passing: Comp–Att–Int	15-22	21-33-1
Time of possession	23:11	36:49

Team	Category	Player	Statistics
Bucknell	Passing	Ralph Rucker IV	15/22, 150 yards, 2 TD
Bucknell	Rushing	Tariq Thomas	18 carries, 77 yards
Bucknell	Receiving	Eric Weatherly	5 receptions, 55 yards
Lehigh	Passing	Hayden Johnson	17/23, 200 yards, 1 TD, 1 INT
Lehigh	Rushing	Luke Yoder	22 carries, 137 yards
Lehigh	Receiving	Geoffrey Jamiel	9 receptions, 136 yards

The game was branded as "Tackle Cancer Day" sponsored by Red Robin in partnership with the Leukemia and Lymphoma Society. Lehigh entered the game atop the Patriot league. Lehigh climbed to a 14–0 lead with 4:11 remaining in the first half. Bucknell's TJ Cadden, who had a 73-yard punt return in the previous game, returned a kickoff 100 yards for a touchdown to get the Bison on the board. Over the next 62 seconds Bucknell would force a fumble, and score off a 31-yard pass to tie the game 14-14. Lehigh would regain its lead in the third quarter to make the game 21–14. Bucknell's Aaron Davis returned a 79-yard interception to give Bucknell its only lead of regulation, 28–21 with 6 minutes left before Lehigh responded with a short Yoder touchdown run with 1:30 remaining. Bucknell was able to get the ball into field-goal range, however, Bison kicker Matt Schearer bounced the 52-yard attempt off the upright. After exchanging touchdowns, Bucknell's opening drive of the second overtime stalled, resulting in a 42-yard Schearer field goal. Lehigh's response was short lived, as they fumbled the ball which was recovered by Bucknell's Gavin Willis to end the game 38–35. The game put Bucknell at the top of the Patriot League, and was their best start to a season since 2015. Lehigh Junior WR Geoffrey Jamiel had a career day with nine catches for 136 yards and two touchdowns, while Sophomore WR Mason Humphrey also had 109 yards. Lehigh's RB Luke Yoder also carried the ball 22 times for 137 yards and 3 touchdowns, while Lehigh's QBs, Johnson and Perri, went 17-of-23 for 200 years, and 4-of-10 for 98 yards respectively. Despite the loss, the Mountain Hawks led in total yards, 500 to just 270.

=== at Yale (Yank Townsend Trophy) ===
Game Six – Lehigh Mountain Hawks (3–2) at Yale Bulldogs (2–2) – Game summary

Quarter	1	2	3	4	Total
Mountain Hawks	3	7	7	6	23
Bulldogs	14	14	10	0	38

at Yale Bowl • New Haven, Connecticut

- Date: October 19
- Game time: 12:00 p.m. EST/9:00 a.m. PST
- Game attendance: 4,107
- TV announcers (ESPN+): TBD

Game information

First quarter

- (11:27) LEH - Nick Garrido 36 Yard Field Goal (Drive: 8 plays 43 yards, 3:24 Lehigh 3-0)
- (3:46) YALE - Joey Felton 20 Yard pass from Grand Jordan, Nick Conforti Kick (Yale 7-3)
- (0:41) YALE - Da'Quan Gonzales 53 Yard interception return, Nick Conforti Kick (Drive: 6 plays, 90 yards, 3:00 Yale 14-3)

Second quarter

- (14:13) LEH - Luke Yoder 38 Yard run, Nick Garrido Kick (Drive: 4 plays, 48 yards, 1:15 Yale 14-10)
- (3:07) YALE - Grant Jordan 10 Yard run, Nick Conforti Kick (Drive: 9 plays, 53 yards, 4:10 Yale 21-10)
- (3:07) YALE - Joshua Pitsenberger 10Yard run, Nick Conforti Kick (Drive: 10 plays, 66 yards, 2:08 Yale 28-10)

Third quarter

- (8:19) YALE - Nick Conforti 40 Yard field goal (Drive: 9 plays, 31 yards, 2:39 Yale 31-10)
- (2:56) LEH - Jaden Green 9 Yard run, Nick Garrido Kick (Drive: 10 plays, 67 yards, 5:20 Yale 31-17)
- (0:57) YALE - Tre Peterson 57 Yard run, Nick Conforti Kick (Drive: 4 plays, 75 yards, 1:59 Yale 38-17)

Fourth quarter

- (1:52) LEH - Hayden Johnson 7 Yard run, Nick Garrido PAT failed (Drive: 10 plays, 60 yards, 4:20 Yale 38-23)

Statistics	LEH	YALE
First downs	20	20
Total yards	372	365
Rushing yards	250	258
Passing yards	122	107
Passing: Comp–Att–Int	14-29-3	15-26-1
Time of possession	31:56	28:04

Team	Category	Player	Statistics
Lehigh	Passing	Hayden Johnson	8/16, 74 Yards, 1 INT
Lehigh	Rushing	Luke Yoder	15 carries, 143 yards, 1 TD
Lehigh	Receiving	Geoffrey Jamiel	7 receptions, 54 yards
Yale	Passing	Grant Jordan	15/26, 107 yards, 1 TD, 1 INT
Yale	Rushing	Tre Peterson	12 carries, 98 yards, 1 TD
Yale	Receiving	Mason Shipp	6 receptions, 55 yards

Lehigh opened scoring with a field goal on the game-opening drive. Yale's opening drive started when Aidan Singleton picked off the Bulldog's Grant Jordan, however, Lehigh was unable to capitalize on the turnover. Grant responded with a 20-yard pass to Joey Felton on his second ever pass attempt, before Yale scored, which was quickly followed by a Yale intercepting Lehigh QB Dante Perri, and returning the interception for 53 yards and a touchdown making it 14–3 at the end of the quarter. The Mountain Hawk's Luke Yoder scored on a 38-yard run, making it 14–10, the closest the game would be. Yale's Grant then scored on a 10-yard run with the Bulldogs scoring again with a fourth and 1 plunge by Josh Pitsenberger with 5 seconds left in the half after another Lehigh interception. Yale's Nick Conforti extended the lead with a 40-yard field goal after a Lehigh fumble, with Lehigh responding with a 10-play 68-yard drive capped with a 10-yard Rushing touchdown by Jaden Green. With the win Yale retained the Yank Townsend Trophy, which has been awarded to the winner of each Lehigh-Yale game since 2006. Yoder ran for 143 yards and a touchdown.

=== Fordham ===
Game Seven – Fordham Rams (0–7) vs Lehigh Mountain Hawks (3–3) – Game summary

Quarter	1	2	3	4	Total
Rams	3	0	0	16	19
Mountain Hawks	7	24	2	0	33

at Goodman Stadium • Lower Saucon Township, Pennsylvania

- Date: October 26
- Game time: 12:00 p.m. EST/9:00 a.m. PST
- Game attendance: 3,428
- TV: ESPN+

Game information

First quarter

- (6:18) FOR - Bennett Henderson 44 yard field goal (Drive: 9 plays, 65 yards, 3:51 Fordham 3-0)
- (2:17) LEH - Jaden Green 44 Yard Run, Nich Garrido Kick (Drive: 7 plays 75 yards, 4:01 Lehigh 7-3)

Second quarter

- (13:25) LEH - Nick Garrido 41 yard field goal (Drive: 8 plays, 50 yards, 3:09 Lehigh 10-3)
- (8:09) LEH - Matt Machalik 2 yard run, Nick Garrido Kick (Drive: 10 plays, 46 yards, 5:05 Lehigh 17-3)
- (1:41) LEH - Matt Machalik 2 yard run, Nick Garrido Kick (Drive: 8 plays, 69 yards, 2:49 Lehigh 24-3)
- (0:34) LEH - Matt D'Avino 33 yard pass from Hayden Johnson, Nick Garrido Kick (Drive: 3 plays, 45 yards, 0:27 Lehigh 31-3)

Third quarter

- (8:27) Team Safety (Lehigh 33-3)

Fourth quarter

- (10:27) FOR - Tripp Holley 11 yard run, Julius Loughridge two point conversion (Drive: 6 plays, 29 yards, 2:00 Lehigh 33-11)
- (1:44) FOR - Julius Loughridge 9 yard run, Tripp Holley two point conversion (Drive: 17 plays, 66 yards, 4:58 Lehigh 33-19)

Statistics	FOR	LEH
First downs	16	18
Total yards	226	372
Rushing yards	98	246
Passing yards	128	126
Passing: Comp–Att–Int	15-34-1	10-17
Time of possession	26:25	33:35

Team	Category	Player	Statistics
Fordham	Passing	Trip Holley	8/18, 69 yards
Fordham	Rushing	Julius Loughridge	17 carries, 77 yards, 1 TD
Fordham	Receiving	Cole Thornton	4 receptions, 37 yards
Lehigh	Passing	Hayden Johnson	6/9, 99 yards, 1 TD
Lehigh	Rushing	Jaden Green	17 carries, 147 yards, 1 TD
Lehigh	Receiving	Geoffrey Jamiel	3 receptions, 47 yards

Lehigh's "Pride Day", presented by the Pride Center and Office of Diversity, equity, and inclusion. The game started with Fordham taking a 3–0 lead off a field goal. Lehigh would then score on five-straight possessions to led 31–3 at halftime including a 44-yard Green rushing touchdown, a field goal, a pair of 2-yard rushing touchdowns by Matt Machalik, and a 33-yard receiving touchdown by Matt D'Avina. All four of Lehigh's touchdowns were scored by first-years, and this was the third straight game where Lehigh eclipsed 200-yards rushing. This was the first time Lehigh beat Fordham since 2019, and Lehigh honored it's 1979 Division I-AA national runner-up squad and 1980 Lambert Cup Championship team during halftime.

=== at Georgetown ===
Game Eight – Lehigh Mountain Hawks (4–3) at Georgetown Hoyas (5–3) – Game summary

Quarter	1	2	3	4	Total
Mountain Hawks	0	24	12	7	43
Hoyas	0	0	0	6	6

at Cooper Field • Washington, D.C.

- Date: November 2
- Game time: 12:30 p.m. EST/9:30 a.m. PST
- Game attendance: 3,799
- TV announcers (ESPN+): TBD

Game information

First quarter

No scoring plays

Second quarter

- (13:37) LEH - Hayden Johnson 1 yard run, Nick Garrido kick (Drive: 1 play, 1 yard, 0:07 Lehigh 7-0)
- (10:40) LEH - Jaden Green 24 yard run, Nick Garrido kick (Drive: 3 plays, 58 yards, 1:16 Lehigh 14-0)
- (7:20) LEH - Jaden Green 57 yard run, Nick Garrido kick (Drive: 3 plays, 73 yards, 1:28 Lehigh 21-0)
- (0:21) LEH - Nick Garrido 29 yard field goal (Drive: 8 plays, 68 yards, 2:49 Lehigh 24-0)

Third quarter

- (11:05) LEH - Jordan Adderley 55 yard interception return, Nick Garrido kick (Drive: 5 plays, 25 yards, 2:10 Lehigh 31-0)
- (6:25) LEH - Nick Garrido 30 yard field goal (Drive: 7 plays, 55 yards, 4:17 Lehigh 34-0)
- (2:59) LEH - Team Saftey (Lehigh 36-0)

Fourth quarter

- (6:34) GTWN - Max McCormick 5 yard pass from Danny Lauter, two-point conversion failed (Drive: 13 plays, 90 yards, 5:46 Lehigh 36-6)
- (4:18) LEH - Connor Hilling 20 yard run, Canaan Kimball kick (Drive: 4 plays, 47 yards, 2:14 Lehigh 43-6)

Statistics	LEH	GTWN
First downs	15	15
Total yards	385	262
Rushing yards	310	73
Passing yards	75	189
Passing: Comp–Att–Int	5-14-1	22-38-3
Time of possession	28:54	31:06

Team	Category	Player	Statistics
Lehigh	Passing	Hayden Johnson	4/8, 75 yards
Lehigh	Rushing	Jaden Green	8 carries, 88 yards, 2 TD
Lehigh	Receiving	Mason Humphrey	1 reception, 31 yards
Georgetown	Passing	Danny Lauter	22/37, 1 TD, 1 INT
Georgetown	Rushing	Bryce Cox	11 carries, 77 yards
Georgetown	Receiving	Jimmy Kibble	5 receptions, 47 yards

Riding off the momentum from their win against Fordham, Lehigh would route Georgetown. However, the first quarter saw Lehigh punt and throw an interception, while Georgetown would turn it over on downs twice. The second quarter would open with Junior defensive back Nick Peltekian catching an interception for Lehigh, resulting in a go-ahead one-yard rushing touchdown by Hayden Johnson. In the two ensuing drives Lehigh's Jaden Green would score rushing touchdowns, while Georgetown missed a 29-yard field goal, making it 24–0 at halftime. Georgetown's Danny Lauter was called for international grounding while throwing in the end-zone, resulting in a Lehigh safety. The Hoyas' only points came from a 5-yard pass to Max Mcormick. The Mountain Hawk's Jordan Adderley returned an interception for a touchdown extending the lead to 31–0. Lehigh rushed for 310 yards, including 88 from Jordan Green, and 83 yards from quarterback Hayden Johnson. This was the biggest Lehigh victory against a conference opponent since 2007, when Lehigh beat Georgetown 45–0. The game saw Lehigh replace Georgetown as the second-place team in the Patriot league behind just Holy Cross.

=== at Holy Cross ===
Game Nine – Lehigh Mountain Hawks (5–3) at Holy Cross Crusaders (4–5) – Game summary

Quarter	1	2	3	4	Total
Mountain Hawks	0	7	3	0	10
Crusaders	0	7	0	0	7

at Fitton Field • Worcester, Massachusetts

- Date: November 9
- Game time: 12:00 p.m. EST/9:00 a.m. PST
- Game attendance: 12,910
- TV announcers (ESPN+): TBD

Game information

First quarter
Second quarter

- (14:51) LEH - Mason Humphrey 12 yard pass from Dante Perri, Nick Garrido kick (Drive: 15 plays, 87 yards, 9:55 Lehigh 7-0)
- (9:29) HC - Jacob Petersen 10 yard pass from Joe Pesansky, Daniel Porto kick (Drive: 9 plays, 60 yards, 5:19 Tied 7-7)

Third quarter

- Nick Garrido 25 yard field goal (Drive: 13 plays, 55 yards, 7:06 Lehigh 10-7)

Fourth quarter

Statistics	LEH	HC
First downs	16	15
Total yards	223	258
Rushing yards	168	110
Passing yards	55	149
Passing: Comp–Att–Int	7-10	17-28
Time of possession	29:35	30:25

Team	Category	Player	Statistics
Lehigh	Passing	Dante Perri	4/5 29 yards 1 TD
Lehigh	Rushing	Luke Yoder	18 carries, 66 yards
Lehigh	Receiving	Geoffrey Jamiel	3 receptions, 35 yards
Holy Cross	Passing	Joe Pesansky	17/26, 148 yards, 1 TD
Holy Cross	Rushing	Jayden Clerveaux	20 carries, 84 yards
Holy Cross	Receiving	Max Mosey	5 receptions, 46 yards

Due to the results the week prior, this game was a match-up between the Patriot league's Number 1, Holy Cross, and Number 2, Lehigh. In the second quarter the two teams traded passing touchdowns, with the Mountain Hawk's Dante Perri throwing a 12-yard touchdown to Mason Humphrey, while the Crusaders Joe Pesansky threw a 10-yard touchdown to Jacob Petersen to tie the game at 7–7 at halftime. Lehigh's Nick Garrido kicked a go-ahead field goal with 8 minutes left in the third quarter to win the game. Holy Cross' Daniel Porto attempted a 52-yard game tying field-goal with 2:24 left in the game that was blocked. The game was played 100 years and 1 day to the day the teams first played each other in 1924. This was also the first Lehigh win against Holy Cross since 2017. The win gave Lehigh the lead in the overall series, 20–19–1. With the loss there was a three-way tie for first place in the Patriot league between Lehigh, Holy Cross, and Bucknell. The outcome of the game would be the tie-breaker which would see Lehigh advance to the FCS playoffs when Lehigh and Holy Cross tied for Patriot league co-champions at the end of the season.

=== Colgate ===
Game Ten – Colgate Raiders (2–8) vs Lehigh Mountain Hawks (6–3) – Game summary

Quarter	1	2	3	4	Total
Raiders	3	0	0	14	17
Mountain Hawks	7	10	14	14	45

at Goodman Stadium • Lower Saucon Township, Pennsylvania

- Date: November 16
- Game time: 12:00 p.m. EST/9:00 a.m. PST
- Game attendance: 3,321
- TV: ESPN+

Game information

First quarter

- (12:51) LEH - Luke Yoder 1 yard run, Nick Garrido kick (Drive: 4 plays, 60 yards, 2:00 Lehigh 7-0)
- (5:40) COLG - Luke Vogeler 25 yard field goal (Drive: 14 plays, 60 yards, 7:04 Lehigh 7-3)

Second quarter

- (12:33) LEH - Nick Garrido 37 yard field goal (Drive: 15 plays, 51 yards, 8:07 Lehigh 10-3)
- (2:24) LEH - Geoffrey Jamiel 7 yard pass from Hayden Johnson, Nick Garrido kick (Drive: 11 plays, 49 yards, 6:26 Lehigh 17-3)

Third quarter

- (10:44) LEH - Mason Humphrey 19 yard pass from Hayden Johnson, Nick Garrido kick (Drive: 5 plays, 68 yards, 2:26 LEH 24-3)
- (1:22) LEH - Jaden Green 33 yards run, Nick Garrido kick (Drive: 8 plays, 80 yards, 5:02 Lehigh 31-3)

Fourth quarter

- (11:33) COLG - Treyvhon Saunders 33 yard pass from Jake Stearney, Luke Vogeler kick (Drive: 10 plays, 75 yards, 4:54 Lehigh 31-10)
- (7:14) LEH - Geoffrey Jamiel 51 yard pass from Hayden Johnson, Nick Garrido kick (Drive: 8 plays, 78 yards, 4:14 Lehigh 38-10)
- (2:09) COLG - William Parker 8 yard pass from Jake Stearney, Luke Vogeler kick (Drive: 15 plays, 75 yards, 5:02 Lehigh 38-17)
- (1:14) LEH - Aaron Crossley 84 yard run, Canaan Kimball kick (Drive: 3 plays, 75 yards, 1:02 Lehigh 45-17)

Statistics	COLG	LEH
First downs	19	22
Total yards	321	475
Rushing yards	54	271
Passing yards	267	204
Passing: Comp–Att–Int	34-44	16-21
Time of possession	29:43	30:17

Team	Category	Player	Statistics
Colgate	Passing	Jake Stearney	33/42, 263 yards, 2 TDs
Colgate	Rushing	Chris Gee	8 carries, 39 yards
Colgate	Receiving	Reed Swanson	8 receptions, 81 yards
Lehigh	Passing	Hayden Johnson	16/21, 204 yards, 3 TDs
Lehigh	Rushing	Jaden Green	12 carries, 103 yards, 1 TD
Lehigh	Receiving	Geoffrey Jamiel	7 receptions, 125 yards, 2 TDs

Returning home for the "Salute to Service" game sponsored by Weis Markets, Lehigh gained 475 total yards of offense with 271 from rushing. Lehigh scored after just four plays on its opening drive with a 1-yard rushing touchdown from Luke Yoder. The Raiders responded with a 25-yard field goal. In their second possession the Mountain Hawks put together a 15-play 8:07 drive to milk the clock resulting in a 37-yard field goal, quickly followed by a scoring pass from Hayden Johnson to Geoffrey Jamiel and a Nick Garrido field goal to lead 17–3. On the first drive of the second half Lehigh would score again with Johnson hitting sophomore Mason Humphrey for 19-yards, quickly followed by a 330-yard rushing touchdown from Jaden Green to put the Mountain Hawks up 31–3. Colgate would break Lehigh's scoring run with a 33-yard pass from Jake stearney to Treyvhon Saunders, but lehigh answered with a 78-yard drive resulting in a 51-yard bubble screen touchdown. Late in the fourth quarter true freshman Aaron Crossley scored again for Lehigh with an 84-yard run. Lehigh remained tied with Holy Cross for first place in the patriot league.

=== Lafayette (The Rivalry) ===
Game Eleven – Lafayette Leopards (6–5) vs Lehigh Mountain Hawks (7–3) – Game summary

Quarter	1	2	3	4	Total
Leopards	7	0	7	0	14
Mountain Hawks	7	21	3	7	38

at Goodman Stadium • Lower Saucon Township, Pennsylvania

- Date: November 23
- Game time: 12:00 p.m. EST/9:00 a.m. PST
- Game weather: Sunny
- Game attendance: 15,097
- Referee: Todd Boyd
- TV announcers (ESPN+): Marco Socci (play-by-play) and Mike Yadush (analyst)

Game information

First quarter

- (9:47) LEH - Jaden Green 19 yard run, Nick Garrido kick (Drive: 9 plays, 69 yards, 5:03 Lehigh 7-0)
- (5:15) LAF - Jamar Curtis 9 yard run, Jack Simonetta kick (Drive: 9 plays, 82 yards, 4:26 Tied 7-7)

Second quarter

- (12:26) LEH - Matt Machalik 1 yard run, Nick Garrido kick (Drive: 8 plays, 68 yards, 4:44 Lehigh 14-7)
- (6:53) LEH - Mason Humphrey 23 yard pass from Hayden Johnson, Nick Garrido kick (Drive: 6 plays, 59 yards, 3:08 Lehigh 21-7)
- (0:01) LEH - Hayden Johnson 5 yard run, Nick Garrido kick (Drive: 6 plays, 80 yards, 1:00 Lehigh 28-7)

Third quarter

- (11:31) LAF - Jamar Curtis 2 yard run, Jack Simonetta kick (Drive: 10 plays, 76 yards, 4:32 Lehigh 28-14)
- (2:02) LEH - Nick Garrido 31 yard field goal (Drive: 14 plays, 54 yards, 8:10 Lehigh 31-14)

Fourth quarter

- (7:30) LEH - Mason Moore 41 yard interception return, Nick Garrido kick (Drive: 3 plays, 80 yards, 0:54 Lehigh 38-14)

Statistics	LAF	LEH
First downs	19	25
Total yards	283	344
Rushing yards	112	229
Passing yards	171	115
Passing: Comp–Att–Int	20–25–2	10–13–1
Time of possession	27:59	32:01

Team	Category	Player	Statistics
Lafayette	Passing	Dean DeNobile	20/25, 171 yards, 2 INTs
Lafayette	Rushing	Jamar Curtis	21 carries, 131 yards, 2 TDs
Lafayette	Receiving	Elijah Steward	10 receptions, 78 yards
Lehigh	Passing	Hayden Johnson	10/13, 115 yards, 1 TD, 1 INT
Lehigh	Rushing	Jaden Green	11 carries, 69 yards, 1 TD
Lehigh	Receiving	Geoffrey Jamiel	4 receptions, 39 yards

Lehigh went into the 160th edition of The Rivalry tied for first in the Patriot league with a win guaranteeing a championship season. Lehigh sold the game out, the first time since 2013, amidst slumping attendance, with 2022 seeing the lowest average attendance since 1952. Scoring opened with Lehigh's Jaden Green rushing for 19-yards on the opening drive, with Lafayette matching the score with a Jamar Curtis rushing touchdown. The following drive saw the Mountain Hawk's Matt Machalik punch in a one-yard touchdown to regain the lead. In the second quarter Lehigh scored 21 unanswered points for a 28–7 halftime lead. Lehigh also scored on their opening drive of the second half with Lehigh's defense shutting down Lafayette for the rest of the game. The win gave the Mountain Hawks their 13th Patriot League championship, and with the tie-breaker against Holy Cross, a ticket to the FCS playoffs. First-year quarterback Hayden Johnson was voted game MVP for his passing and rushing touchdowns. After the game Lehigh students rushed the field and tore down the goal posts, the first time this had happened since 1989 when Lehigh phased out wooden goalposts. Before then it had been an annual tradition to tear town the wooden posts after the rivalry game. The students then carried the goal-posts over 5 miles and over South Mountain to throw it into the Lehigh River at Fahy bridge. Northampton County district attorney Stephen Baratta, a proud Lafayette alumni, stated that the act constituted "criminal code violations" and that " this is not behavior that we can really sanction." Bethlehem police attempted to stop the procession, but where stopped by Lehigh campus police who gave the students an escort. Baratta stated that he intends to identify and charge the 300+ students who carried the goalpost.

=== at No. 9 Richmond—NCAA Division I First Round ===
Round One – Lehigh Mountain Hawks (8–3) – No. 9 Richmond Spiders (10–2) Game summary

Quarter	1	2	3	4	Total
Mountain Hawks	0	7	0	13	20
No. 9 Spiders	3	6	0	7	16

at E. Claiborne Robins Stadium • Richmond, Virginia

- Date: November 30
- Game time: 2:00 p.m. EST/11:00 p.m. PST
- Game weather: Sunny • Temperature: 41 °F (5 °C) • Wind: W 10 mph
- Game attendance: 3,220
- TV announcers (ESPN+): Jason Ross Jr. (play-by-play) and Tyoka Jackson (analyst)

Game information

First quarter

- (7:03) RICH - Sean O'Haire 25 yard field goal (Drive: 15 plays, 76 yards, 7:57 Richmond 3-0)

Second quarter

- (5:27) RICH - Sean O'Haire 27 yard field goal (Drive: 17 plays, 70 yards, 8:43 Richmond 6-0)
- (1:04) LEH - Logan Galletta 7 yard pass from Hayden Johnson, Nick Garrido kick (Drive: 9 plays, 82 yards, 4:23 Lehigh 7-6)
- (0:00) RICH - Sean O'Haire 21 yard field goal (Drive: 8 plays, 64 yards, 1:04 Richmond 9-7)

Third quarter
Fourth quarter

- (10:36) RICH - Sean Clarke 7 yard pass from Camden Coleman, Sean O'Haire kick (Drive: 5 plays, 39 yards, 1:43 Richmond 16-7)
- (10:25) LEH - Jaden Green 65 yard run, Nick Garrido kick (Drive: 1 play, 65 yards, 0:11 Richmond 16-14)
- (6:21) LEH - Geoffrey Jamiel 54 yard pass from Hayden Johnson, two-point conversion failed (Drive: 5 plays, 65 yards, 3:13 Lehigh 20-16)

Statistics	LEH	RICH
First downs	16	18
Total yards	336	345
Rushing yards	136	146
Passing yards	200	199
Passing: Comp–Att–Int	15-20-2	24-37
Time of possession	29:48	30:12

Team	Category	Player	Statistics
Lehigh	Passing	Hayden Johnson	14/18, 199 yards, 2 TDs, 1 INT
Lehigh	Rushing	Jaden Green	11 carries, 70 yards, 1 TD
Lehigh	Receiving	Geoffrey Jamiel	10 receptions, 137 yards, 1 TD
Richmond	Passing	Camden Coleman	24/27, 199 yards, 1 TD
Richmond	Rushing	Zach Palmer-Smith	22 carries, 107 yards
Richmond	Receiving	Landon Ellis	12 receptions, 76 yards

Lehigh's first playoff appearance since 2017 would be as underdogs against the Number 9 ranked and top-ranked conference scoring defense of the Richmond Spiders. Lehigh's opening drive ended in a Matt Machalik interception with the Spiders then driving to Lehigh's one-yard line before being backed up by two false-starts resulting in a 25-yard field goal to open scoring. Richmond would kick another field goal before Lehigh's Hayden Johnson made a 41-yard pass to Matt D'Avino to set up a 7-yard pass to Logan Galletta for a touchdown to take a short-lived 7–6 lead. The Spiders would respond by entering the red-zone with 15 seconds left on the clock, being forced to settle for a field goal and a 9–7 halftime lead. Early in the third quarter Lehigh attempted a fake field-goal at the 6-yard line which Richmond stopped. Following a Johnson interception, Richmond would score on a short pass. Lehigh trailed 16-7 early into the fourth quarter before Jaden Green dashed 65-yards on their first play of the drive to cut the lead to just 16–14. Lehigh would force a 3-and-out and on the next drive Hayden Johnson connected on a 56-yard pass to Geoffrey Jamiel to take the lead. The Spider's response would be stopped short of midfield and then muffed the punt for Lehigh to preserve the win. This was the first Lehigh playoff win since 2011 when Lehigh beat the Towson Tigers. The Mountain Hawks and Spiders will have a rematch for the 2025 season opener as Richmond becomes a member of the Patriot League.

=== at No. 8 Idaho—NCAA Division I Second Round ===
Round Two – Lehigh Mountain Hawks (9–3) – No. 8 Idaho Vandals (10–2) Game summary

Quarter	1	2	3	4	Total
Mountain Hawks	0	6	0	7	13
No. 8 Vandals	6	13	15	0	34

at Kibbie Dome • Moscow, Idaho

- Date: December 7
- Game time: 2:00 p.m. EST/11:00 p.m. PST
- TV: ESPN+

Game information

First quarter

- IDHO – Jordan Dwyer 5-yard pass from Jack Layne (PAT failed), 4:27. Vandals 6–0. Drive: 14 plays, 80 yards, 6:57.

Second quarter

- IDHO – Jordan Dwyer 62-yard pass from Jack Layne (2-point pass conversion failed), 11:50. Vandals 12–0. Drive: 5 plays, 89 yards, 1:04.
- LEH – Nick Garrido 35-yard field goal, 6:26. Vandals 12–3. Drive: 11 plays, 57 yards, 5:24.
- IDHO – Mark Hamper 42-yard pass from Jack Layne (Cameron Pope kick), 1:33. Vandals 19–3. Drive: 1 play, 42 yards, 0:07.
- LEH – Nick Garrido 39-yard field goal, 0:00. Vandals 19–6. Drive: 10 plays, 53 yards, 1:33.

Third quarter

- IDHO – Deshaun Buchanan 2-yard run (Jack Layne pass to Jordan Dwyer for 2-point conversion), 10:59. Vandals 27–6. Drive: 10 plays, 75 yards, 3:55.
- IDHO – Zach Johnson 74-yard interception return (Cameron Pope kick), 6:30. Vandals 34–6. Drive: 11 plays, 75 yards, 4:29.

Fourth quarter

- LEH – Dante Perri 1-yard run (Nick Garrido kick), 0:28. Vandals 34–13. Drive: 8 plays, 70 yards, 3:46.

Statistics	LEH	IDHO
First downs	20	19
Total yards	371	410
Rushing yards	169	92
Passing yards	202	318
Passing: Comp–Att–Int	17-31-1	16–22–0
Time of possession	31:18	28:42

Team	Category	Player	Statistics
Lehigh	Passing	Hayden Johnson	13/27, 143 yards, INT
Lehigh	Rushing	Luke Yoder	11 carries, 74 yards
Lehigh	Receiving	Mason Humphrey	6 receptions, 98 yards
Idaho	Passing	Jack Layne	16/22, 318 yards, 3 TD
Idaho	Rushing	Deshaun Buchanan	15 carries, 42 yards, TD
Idaho	Receiving	Jordan Dwyer	7 receptions, 166 yards, 2 TD

The second ever meeting between the Vandals and Mountain Hawks, with the last meeting being a 77–14 blowout in Idaho's favor in 1993 when Lehigh played Idaho as a late-season non-conference opponent which was also the first time Lehigh ever played an indoors game. Lehigh's defense had a strong first-quarter performance, keeping the game to one-score until 12 minutes left in the half when Idaho's Jack Layne found Jordan Dwyer deep downfield for a 62-yard passing touchdown. Just a few minutes later the Vandals would score again off a 45-yard fake slant from Mark Hamper turning a once 6-point lead into a 16-point lead. In the second half the Vandals would steadily outscore Lehigh 18–10. The final score of the game would be a 76-yard pick-six thrown by Lehigh's Hayden Johnson for a final 28-point lead. After the game Lehigh's coach Kevin Cahill expressed admiration for Idaho's play-style and called the game a great test for a Lehigh team mostly composed of underclassmen.

== Postseason ==
Lehigh held its annual post-season banquet on February 2, 2025, at which linebacker Mike DeNucci won the Archibald Johnston Cup, given to the program's most outstanding player. DeNucci was also a first-team All-Patriot League honoree, an All-ECAC selection and was one of 35 finalists for the Buck Buchanan Award. Senior linebacker Tucker Knupp won the Scholar-Athlete Award due to his performance both on the field and in the classroom. Junior defensive lineman Matt Spatny won the James P. McConologue Award, the "Coaches Award" given to the player that is "all football." Spatny, also a first-team All-Patriot League honoree, was one of two Lehigh players to capture honorable mention All-America honors from the Associated Press in December. Junior linebacker Tyler Ochojski won the Barry Fetterman award for selflessness, junior wide receiver Geoffrey Jamiel won the John C. Whitehead award for leadership, fifth-year center George Padezanin won the Alexander G. Hahalis for outstanding lineman, and graduate student quarterback Dante Perri won the Coach B Award given to seniors that made a significant impact on the program beyond on-field performance. Sophomore Luke Yoder and first-year Jaden Green, both second team All-Patriot League honorees, won the outstanding offensive back award, while sophomore Mason Humphrey and junior Langston Jones received the other offensive positional awards, Jones was also a first team All-Patriot League selection. Defensive positional awards went to junior TJ Burke and sophomore Mason Moore while Nick Garrido won the outstanding special teams player award. The Nick Timko Award, given to the best scout team players, was won by senior Matt Rauscher and sophomore Benjamin Manley.

First-year running back Jaden Green was named one of 25 finalists for the Jerry Rice Award while head coach Kevin Cahill was one of 15 finalists for the Eddie Robinson Award.The Mountain Hawks ranked in the top 10 in the FCS in rushing offense, pass defense and total defense and their turnaround from 2–9 to 9-4 was the best in school history. After the end of the season Lehigh would be ranked No. 20 by STATS and No. 21 by FCS coaches.
