= 2024 Villanova Wildcats football team =

American college football season

2024 Villanova Wildcats football

NCAA Division I Second Round, L 6–13 at Incarnate Word
- Conference: CAA Football Conference

Ranking
- STATS: No. 11
- FCS Coaches: No. 9
- Record: 10–4 (6–2 CAA)
- Head coach: Mark Ferrante (8th season)
- Offensive coordinator: Chris Boden (6th season)
- Offensive scheme: Spread
- Defensive coordinator: Ross Pennypacker (3rd season)
- Base defense: Multiple 3–3–5
- Home stadium: Villanova Stadium

2024 Coastal Athletic Association Football Conference standings
	Conf.			Overall
Team	W		L	W		L
No. 15 Richmond +^	8	–	0	10	–	3
No. 9 Rhode Island* +^	7	–	1	11	–	3
No. 12 Villanova ^	6	–	2	10	–	4
Delaware*	6	–	2	9	–	2
No. 23 New Hampshire ^	6	–	2	8	–	5
Stony Brook	5	–	3	8	–	4
Towson	5	–	3	7	–	5
Elon	5	–	3	6	–	6
William & Mary	4	–	4	7	–	5
Monmouth	4	–	4	6	–	6
Maine	3	–	5	5	–	7
Albany	2	–	6	4	–	8
Hampton	2	–	6	5	–	7
Campbell	1	–	7	3	–	9
Bryant	0	–	8	2	–	10
North Carolina A&T	0	–	8	1	–	11
+ – Conference co-champions; ^ – FCS playoff participant; * Delaware ineligible for rankings and 2024 FCS playoffs due to transition to the FBS. Richmond and Rhode Island named co-champions as Rhode Island's only CAA loss was to Delaware.; Rankings from STATS Poll

The 2024 Villanova Wildcats football team represented Villanova University as a member of the Coastal Athletic Association Football Conference (CAA) during the 2024 NCAA Division I FCS football season. The Wildcats were led by eight-year head coach Mark Ferrante and played home games at Villanova Stadium located in Villanova, Pennsylvania.

== Schedule ==
Date	Time	Opponent	Rank	Site	TV	Result	Attendance
August 29	6:00 p.m.	No. 25 Youngstown State*	No. 6	Villanova Stadium; Villanova, PA	FloSports	W 24–17	5,421
September 7	6:00 p.m.	at Colgate*	No. 5	Andy Kerr Stadium; Hamilton, NY	ESPN+	W 28–3	2,619
September 14	3:30 p.m.	Towson	No. 5	Villanova Stadium; Villanova, PA	FloSports	W 14–13	4,219
September 21	12:00 p.m.	at Maryland*	No. 5	SECU Stadium; College Park, MD	BTN	L 20–38	38,006
September 28	6:00 p.m.	LIU*	No. 6	Villanova Stadium; Villanova, PA	FloSports	W 24–10	6,111
October 5	3:30 p.m.	at Stony Brook	No. 6	Kenneth P. LaValle Stadium; Stony Brook, NY	FloSports	W 42–24	6,142
October 19	1:00 p.m.	at Maine	No. 5	Alfond Stadium; Orono, ME	FloSports	L 7–35	6,860
October 26	3:30 p.m.	New Hampshire	No. 13	Villanova Stadium; Villanova, PA	FloSports	W 14–6	5,015
November 2	1:00 p.m.	at Hampton	No. 13	Armstrong Stadium; Hampton, VA	FloSports	W 20–14	1,454
November 9	1:00 p.m.	North Carolina A&T	No. 12	Villanova Stadium; Villanova, PA	FloSports	W 31–3	4,009
November 16	12:00 p.m.	at Monmouth	No. 9	Kessler Field; West Long Branch, NJ	FloSports	L 33–40	2,856
November 23	1:00 p.m.	Delaware	No. 15	Villanova Stadium; Villanova, PA (Battle of the Blue)	FloSports	W 38–28	7,105
November 30	2:00 p.m.	No. 22 Eastern Kentucky*	No. 12	Villanova Stadium; Villanova, PA (NCAA Division I First Round)	ESPN+	W 22–17	1,722
December 7	2:00 p.m.	at No. 6 Incarnate Word*	No. 12	Gayle and Tom Benson Stadium; San Antonio, TX (NCAA Division I Second Round)	ESPN+	L 6–13	1,926
*Non-conference game; Rankings from STATS Poll released prior to the game; All times are in Eastern time

== Game summaries ==
=== vs. No. 25 Youngstown State ===
Game One – No. 25 Youngstown State Penguins (0-0) at No. 6 Villanova Wildcats (0-0) – Game summary

Quarter	1	2	3	4	Total
No. 25 Penguins	0	3	7	7	17
No. 6 Wildcats	10	7	7	0	24

at Villanova Stadium, Villanova, PA

- Date: Thursday August 29, 2024
- Game time: 6:00 PM
- Game weather: Cloudy • Temperature: 77 °F (25 °C) • Wind: NE at 9 miles per hour (14 km/h)
- Game attendance: 5,421
- Referee: Henry Wimberg
- TV announcers (FloSports): John Fanta (play-by-play) and Steve Pinone (analyst)

Game information

First quarter

- (8:57) VILL – Ethan Gettman 42-yard field goal (Drive: 6 plays, 42 yards, 2:43; Villanova 3–0)
- (1:23) VILL – Connor Watkins 14-yard run, Ethan Gettman kick (Drive: 7 plays, 79 yards, 4:04; Villanova 10–0)

Second quarter

- (6:28) YSU – Andrew Lastovka 27-yard field goal (Drive: 15 plays, 65 yards, 9:47; Villanova 10–3)
- (2:20) VILL – Isaiah Ragland 3-yard run, Ethan Gettman kick (Drive: 7 plays, 45 yards, 3:57; Villanova 17–3)

Third quarter

- (10:52) VILL – Connor Watkins 29-yard run, Ethan Gettman kick (Drive: 4 plays, 88 yards, 2:23; Villanova 24–3)
- (1:30) YSU – Cyrus Traugh 18-yard pass from Beau Brungard, Andrew Lastovka kick (Drive: 15 plays, 72 yards, 9:14; Villanova 24–10)

Fourth quarter

- (4:24) YSU – Tyshon King 1-yard run, Andrew Lastovka kick (Drive: 10 plays, 80 yards, 5:18; Villanova 24–17)

Statistics	YSU	VILL
First downs	21	15
Total yards	321	336
Rushing yards	169	246
Passing yards	152	90
Passing: Comp–Att–Int	18-25-2	6-17-0
Time of possession	36:12	23:48

Team	Category	Player	Statistics
Youngstown State	Passing	Beau Brungard	18/25, 152 yards, TD, 2 INT
Youngstown State	Rushing	Beau Brungard	16 carries, 82 yards
Youngstown State	Receiving	Cyrus Traugh	3 receptions, 42 yards, TD
Villanova	Passing	Connor Watkins	6/17, 90 yards
Villanova	Rushing	Connor Watkins	10 carries, 107 yards, 2 TD
Villanova	Receiving	Jabriel Mace	1 reception, 35 yards

=== at Colgate ===
Game Two – No. 5 Villanova Wildcats (1–0) at Colgate Raiders (0–1) – Game summary

Quarter	1	2	3	4	Total
No. 5 Wildcats	7	0	7	14	28
Raiders	0	3	0	0	3

at Andy Kerr Stadium • Hamilton, NY

- Date: September 7, 2024
- Game time: 6:00 p.m.
- Game weather: 0 °F (−18 °C)
- TV: ESPN+

Game information

First quarter

- (2:59) VILL – Devin Smith 71-yard pass from Connor Watkins, Ethan Gettman kick (Drive: 2 plays, 72 yards, 0:51; Villanova 7–0)

Second quarter

- (14:04) COLG – Luke Vogeler 39-yard field goal (Drive: 9 plays, 54 yards, 3:55; Villanova 7–3)

Third quarter

- (11:53) VILL – Isaiah Ragland 1-yard run, Ethan Gettman kick (Drive: 6 plays, 63 yards, 2:59; Villanova 14–3)

Fourth quarter

- (10:06) VILL – Devin Smith 8-yard pass from Connor Watkins, Ethan Gettman kick (Drive: 12 plays, 69 yards, 5:59; Villanova 21–3)
- (3:59) VILL – Connor Watkins 13-yard run, Ethan Gettman kick (Drive: 8 plays, 52 yards, 4:57; Villanova 28–3)

Statistics	VILL	COLG
First downs	20	18
Total yards	379	264
Rushing yards	132	86
Passing yards	247	178
Passing: Comp–Att–Int	18-28-0	24-42-1
Time of possession	29:09	30:51

Team	Category	Player	Statistics
Villanova	Passing	Connor Watkins	18/28, 247 yards, 2 TD
Villanova	Rushing	Isaiah Ragland	12 carries, 58 yards, TD
Villanova	Receiving	Devin Smith	6 receptions, 116 yards, 2 TD
Colgate	Passing	Michael Brescia	16/32, 140 yards
Colgate	Rushing	Michael Brescia	14 carries, 57 yards
Colgate	Receiving	Treyvhon Saunders	5 receptions 54 yards

=== vs. Towson ===
Game Three – Towson Tigers (1–1) at No. 5 Villanova Wildcats (2–0) – Game summary

Quarter	1	2	3	4	Total
Tigers	7	0	3	3	13
No. 5 Wildcats	0	7	7	0	14

at Villanova Stadium, Villanova, PA

- Date: Saturday September 14, 2024
- Game time: 3:30 p.m.
- TV announcers (FloSports): TBD

Game information

First quarter

- (8:39) TOW – Carter Runyon 30-yard pass from Sean Brown, Keegan Vaughan kick (Drive: 6 plays, 92 yards, 2:12; Towson 7–0)

Second quarter

- (12:10) VILL – Jaylan Sanchez 20-yard pass from Connor Watkins, Ethan Gettman kick (Drive: 9 plays, 54 yards, 4:46; Tied 7–7)

Third quarter

- (11:09) TOW – Keegan Vaughan 41-yard field goal (Drive: 8 plays, 56 yards, 3:47; Towson 10–7)
- (1:16) VILL – Jaylan Sanchez 6-yard pass from Connor Watkins, Ethan Gettman kick (Drive: 4 plays, 80 yards, 2:31; Villanova 14–10)

Fourth quarter

- (11:23) TOW – Keegan Vaughan 23-yard field goal (Drive: 12 plays, 75 yards, 4:48; Villanova 14–13)

Statistics	TOW	VILL
First downs	17	20
Total yards	394	351
Rushing yards	161	235
Passing yards	233	116
Passing: Comp–Att–Int	20-38-0	14-25-0
Time of possession	26:57	33:03

Team	Category	Player	Statistics
Towson	Passing	Sean Brown	20/36, 233 yards, TD
Towson	Rushing	Devin Matthews	14 carries, 135 yards
Towson	Receiving	Carter Runyon	6 receptions, 88 yards, TD
Villanova	Passing	Connor Watkins	14/25, 116 yards, 2 TD
Villanova	Rushing	Isaiah Ragland	17 carries, 141 yards
Villanova	Receiving	Jaylan Sanchez	4 receptions, 59 yards, 2 TD

=== at Maryland (FBS) ===
Game Four – No. 5 Villanova Wildcats (3–0) at Maryland Terrapins (FBS) (2–1) – Game summary

Quarter	1	2	3	4	Total
No. 5 Wildcats	0	0	10	10	20
Terrapins (FBS)	17	7	7	7	38

at SECU Stadium • College Park, MD

- Date: Saturday September 21, 2024
- Game time: 12:00 p.m.
- Game weather: Clear • Temperature: 77 °F (25 °C) • Wind: S 6 mph
- Game attendance: 38,006
- Referee: Greg Sujack
- TV announcers (BTN): Mark Followill (play-by-play) and Anthony Herron (analyst)

Game information

First quarter

- (9:38) UMD – Kaden Prather 18-yard pass from Billy Edwards Jr., Jack Howes kick (Drive: 11 plays, 75 yards, 5:22; Maryland 7–0)
- (5:52) UMD – Roman Hemby 6-yard run, Jack Howes kick (Drive: 7 plays, 57 yards, 2:44; Maryland 14–0)
- (1:29) UMD – Jack Howes 46-yard field goal (Drive: 8 plays, 29 yards, 3:14; Maryland 17–0)

Second quarter

- (2:39) UMD – Nolan Ray 1-yard run, Jack Howes kick (Drive: 13 plays, 80 yards, 6:49; Maryland 24–0)

Third quarter

- (7:17) VIL – Ethan Gettman 33-yard field goal (Drive: 4 plays, -8 yards, 1:20; Maryland 24–3)
- (4:15) VIL – Devin Smith 17-yard pass from Connor Watkins, Ethan Gettman kick (Drive: 6 plays, 53 yards, 3:00; Maryland 24–10)
- (0:36) UMD – Tai Felton 9-yard pass from Billy Edwards Jr., Jack Howes kick (Drive: 8 plays, 75 yards, 3:39; Maryland 31–10)

Fourth quarter

- (10:33) VIL – Ethan Gettman 37-yard field goal (Drive: 11 plays, 55 yards, 5:03; Maryland 31–13)
- (9:06) UMD – MJ Morris 14-yard run, Jack Howes kick (Drive: 4 plays, 75 yards, 1:27; Maryland 38–13)
- (1:11) VIL – Tanner Maddocks 8-yard run, Ethan Gettman kick (Drive: 9 plays, 80 yards, 4:14; Maryland 38–20)

Statistics	VILL	MD
First downs	20	25
Total yards	231	497
Rushing yards	75	159
Passing yards	156	338
Passing: Comp–Att–Int	16–33–0	29–34–1
Time of possession	32:16	27:44

Team	Category	Player	Statistics
Villanova	Passing	Connor Watkins	12/29, 106 yards, TD
Villanova	Rushing	Ja'briel Mace	2 carries, 24 yards
Villanova	Receiving	Devin Smith	5 receptions, 62 yards, TD
Maryland	Passing	Billy Edwards Jr.	28/32, 328 yards, 2 TD, INT
Maryland	Rushing	Roman Hemby	14 carries, 67 yards, TD
Maryland	Receiving	Tai Felton	14 receptions, 157 yards, TD

=== vs. LIU ===
Game Five – LIU Sharks (0–4) at No. 6 Villanova Wildcats (3–1) – Game summary

Quarter	1	2	3	4	Total
Sharks	0	0	0	10	10
No. 6 Wildcats	10	7	0	7	24

at Villanova Stadium, Villanova, PA

- Date: Saturday September 28, 2024
- Game time: 6:00 p.m.
- Game weather: Cloudy • Temperature: 68 °F (20 °C) • Wind: NE 8 mph
- Game attendance: 6,111
- Referee: Todd Bowman
- TV announcers (FloSports): TBD

Game information

First quarter

- (7:55) VIL – Ethan Gettman 24-yard field goal (Drive: 13 plays, 84 yards, 6:55; Villanova 3–0)
- (3:04) VIL – Isaiah Ragland 12-yard run, Ethan Gettman kick (Drive: 3 plays, 19 yards, 1:57; Villanova 10–0)

Second quarter

- (0:34) VIL – Isaiah Ragland 1-yard run, Ethan Gettman kick (Drive: 11 plays, 89 yards, 1:57; Villanova 17–0)

Third quarter

No scoring plays

Fourth quarter

- (14:55) VIL – David Avit 5-yard run, Ethan Gettman kick (Drive: 2 plays, 19 yards, 0:17; Villanova 24–0)
- (12:12) LIU – Pat Bowen 25-yard run, Michael Coney kick (Drive: 4 plays, 75 yards, 2:43; Villanova 24–7)
- (6:33) LIU – Michael Coney 42-yard field goal (Drive: 9 plays, 41 yards, 4:04; Villanova 24–10)

Statistics	LIU	VILL
First downs	10	22
Total yards	176	392
Rushing yards	96	264
Passing yards	80	128
Passing: Comp–Att–Int	11–24–0	10–19–0
Time of possession	22:55	37:05

Team	Category	Player	Statistics
LIU	Passing	Luca Stanzani	11/24, 80 yards
LIU	Rushing	Ludovick Choquette	9 carries, 62 yards
LIU	Receiving	Michael Love	3 receptions, 36 yards
Villanova	Passing	Connor Watkins	10/18, 128 yards
Villanova	Rushing	David Avit	24 carries, 160 yards, TD
Villanova	Receiving	Jaylan Sanchez	2 receptions, 55 yards

=== at Stony Brook ===
Game Six – No. 6 Villanova Wildcats (4–1) at Stony Brook Seawolves (4–1) – Game summary

Quarter	1	2	3	4	Total
No. 6 Wildcats	7	7	14	14	42
Seawolves	7	10	7	0	24

at Kenneth P. LaValle Stadium • Stony Brook, NY

- Date: Saturday October 5, 2024
- Game time: 3:30 PM EST
- Game weather: Sunny
- Game attendance: 6,142
- Referee: Paul Matt Overton
- TV announcers (FloSports): Jonny Wincott (play-by-play), Brandon London (analyst) and Matt Levine (sideline)

Game information

First quarter

- (9:24) SBU – Roland Dempster 9-yard run, Enda Kirby kick (Drive: 3 plays, 19 yards, 0:53; Stony Brook 7–0)
- (0:00) VIL – Lucas Kopecky 26-yard pass from Connor Watkins, Ethan Gettman kick (Drive: 6 plays, 92 yards, 3:03; Tied 7–7)

Second quarter

- (10:13) SBU – Roland Dempster 2-yard run, Enda Kirby kick (Drive: 11 plays, 75 yards, 4:47; Stony Brook 14–7)
- (3:03) VIL – David Avit 1-yard run, Ethan Gettman kick (Drive: 6 plays, 70 yards, 2:36; Tied 14–14)
- (0:00) SBU – Enda Kirby 24-yard field goal (Drive: 4 plays, 1 yard, 1:33; Stony Brook 17–14)

Third quarter

- (10:05) SBU – Roland Dempster 1-yard run, Enda Kirby kick (Drive: 9 plays, 66 yards, 4:48; Stony Brook 24–14)
- (7:08) VIL – David Avit 1-yard run, Ethan Gettman kick (Drive: 2 plays, 26 yards, 0:42; Stony Brook 24–21)
- (3:47) VIL – David Avit 59-yard run, Ethan Gettman kick (Drive: 3 plays, 80 yards, 1:22; Villanova 28–24)

Fourth quarter

- (8:40) VIL – David Avit 72-yard run, Ethan Gettman kick (Drive: 1 play, 72 yards, 0:11; Villanova 35–24)
- (2:26) VIL – Ja'briel Mace 21-yard run, Ethan Gettman kick (Drive: 9 plays, 64 yards, 5:05; Villanova 42–24)

Statistics	VILL	STBK
First downs	19	18
Total yards	432	310
Rushing yards	280	163
Passing yards	152	147
Passing: Comp–Att–Int	9–19–0	22–32–1
Time of possession	28:02	31:58

Team	Category	Player	Statistics
Villanova	Passing	Connor Watkins	9/19, 152 yards, TD
Villanova	Rushing	David Avit	13 carries, 183 yards, 4 TD
Villanova	Receiving	Jaylan Sanchez	3 receptions, 38 yards
Stony Brook	Passing	Tyler Knoop	22/32, 147 yards, INT
Stony Brook	Rushing	Roland Dempster	24 carries, 115 yards, 3 TD
Stony Brook	Receiving	Cal Redman	3 receptions, 50 yards

=== at Maine ===
Game Seven – No. 5 Villanova Wildcats (5–1) at Maine Black Bears (3–3) – Game summary

Quarter	1	2	3	4	Total
No. 5 Wildcats	0	0	0	7	7
Black Bears	21	7	7	0	35

at Alfond Sports Stadium • Orono, ME

- Date: Saturday October 19, 2024
- Game time: 1:00 PM EST
- Game weather: 0 °F (−18 °C)
- TV announcers (FloSports): TBD

Game information

First quarter
Second quarter
Third quarter
Fourth quarter

Statistics	VILL	ME
First downs		
Total yards		
Rushing yards		
Passing yards		
Passing: Comp–Att–Int		
Time of possession		

Team	Category	Player	Statistics
Villanova	Passing		
Villanova	Rushing		
Villanova	Receiving		
Maine	Passing		
Maine	Rushing		
Maine	Receiving		

=== vs. New Hampshire ===
Game Eight – New Hampshire Wildcats (4–3) at No. 13 Villanova Wildcats (5–2) – Game summary

Quarter	1	2	3	4	Total
New Hampshire	3	0	0	3	6
No. 13 Villanova	0	7	0	7	14

at Villanova Stadium, Villanova, PA

- Date: Saturday October 26, 2024
- Game time: 3:30 p.m.
- TV announcers (FloSports): TBD

Game information

First quarter
Second quarter
Third quarter
Fourth quarter

Statistics	UNH	VILL
First downs		
Total yards		
Rushing yards		
Passing yards		
Passing: Comp–Att–Int		
Time of possession		

Team	Category	Player	Statistics
New Hampshire	Passing		
New Hampshire	Rushing		
New Hampshire	Receiving		
Villanova	Passing		
Villanova	Rushing		
Villanova	Receiving		

=== at Hampton ===
Game Nine – No. 13 Villanova Wildcats (6–2) at Hampton Pirates (5–3) – Game summary

Quarter	1	2	3	4	Total
No. 13 Wildcats	3	7	10	0	20
Pirates	7	0	7	0	14

at Armstrong Stadium, Hampton, VA

- Date: Saturday November 2, 2024
- Game time: 1:00 p.m.
- TV: FloSports

Game information

First quarter
Second quarter
Third quarter
Fourth quarter

Statistics	VILL	HAMP
First downs		
Total yards		
Rushing yards		
Passing yards		
Passing: Comp–Att–Int		
Time of possession		

Team	Category	Player	Statistics
Villanova	Passing		
Villanova	Rushing		
Villanova	Receiving		
Hampton	Passing		
Hampton	Rushing		
Hampton	Receiving		

=== vs. North Carolina A&T ===
Game Ten – North Carolina A&T Aggies (1–8) at No. 12 Villanova Wildcats (7–2) – Game summary

Quarter	1	2	3	4	Total
Aggies	0	3	0	0	3
No. 12 Wildcats	7	3	14	7	31

at Villanova Stadium, Villanova, PA

- Date: Saturday November 9, 2024
- Game time: 1:00 p.m.
- TV announcers (FloSports): TBD

Game information

First quarter
Second quarter
Third quarter
Fourth quarter

Statistics	NCAT	VILL
First downs		
Total yards		
Rushing yards		
Passing yards		
Passing: Comp–Att–Int		
Time of possession		

Team	Category	Player	Statistics
North Carolina A&T	Passing		
North Carolina A&T	Rushing		
North Carolina A&T	Receiving		
Villanova	Passing		
Villanova	Rushing		
Villanova	Receiving		

=== at Monmouth ===
Game Eleven – No. 12 Villanova Wildcats (8–2) at Monmouth Hawks (4–6) – Game summary

Quarter	1	2	3	4	Total
No. 12 Wildcats	7	7	3	16	33
Hawks	6	13	14	7	40

at Kessler Field • West Long Branch, NJ

- Date: Saturday November 16, 2024
- Game time: 12:00 PM EST
- Game weather: Sunny, 60 °F (16 °C), Wind: E @ 15 mph
- Game attendance: 2,856
- Referee: Henry Wimberg
- TV announcers (FloSports): Matt Harmon (play-by-play) and Emory Hunt (analyst)

Game information

First quarter

- (10:55) MON – Sone Ntoh 6-yard pass from Derek Robertson (Michael Calton Jr. PAT failed) (Drive: 7 plays, 75 yards, 4:05; Monmouth 6-0)
- (02:19) VIL – Connor Watkins 2-yard run (Ethan Gettman kick) (Drive: 14 plays, 73 yards, 8:36; Villanova 7–6)

Second quarter

- (13:52) MON – Josh Derry 32-yard pass from Derek Robertson (Two-point run conversion failed) (Drive: 7 plays, 75 yards, 3:27; Monmouth 12-7)
- (10:44) MON – Max James 19-yard pass from Derek Robertson (Michael Calton Jr. kick) (Drive: 5 plays, 52 yards, 1:18; Monmouth 19-7)
- (06:26) VIL – David Avit 25-yard run (Ethan Gettman kick) (Drive: 8 plays, 59 yards, 4:10; Monmouth 19-14)

Third quarter

- (10:21) MON – Rodney Nelson 26-yard run (Michael Calton Jr. kick) (Drive: 2 plays, 85 yards, 0:33; Monmouth 26-14)
- (06:50) VIL – Ethan Gettman 26-yard field goal (Drive: 7 plays, 35 yards, 3:22; Monmouth 26-17)
- (5:01) MON – Sone Ntoh 7-yard run (Michael Calton Jr. kick) (Drive: 4 plays, 67 yards, 1:40; Monmouth 33-17)

Fourth quarter

- (14:50) VIL – Connor Watkins 6-yard run (Connor Watkins run for two-point conversion) (Drive: 10 plays, 75 yards, 5:11; Monmouth 33-25)
- (9:31) MON – Sone Ntoh 1-yard run (Michael Calton Jr. kick) (Drive: 10 plays, 75 yards, 5:19; Monmouth 40-25)
- (6:03) VIL – Devin Smith 17-yard pass from Connor Watkins (Connor Watkins run for two-point conversion) (Drive: 12 plays, 79 yards, 3:25; Monmouth 40-33)

Statistics	VILL	MONM
First downs	21	18
Total yards	328	502
Rushing yards	93	144
Passing yards	235	358
Passing: Comp–Att–Int	20–32–0	22–23–0
Time of possession	32:49	27:11

Team	Category	Player	Statistics
Villanova	Passing	Connor Watkins	20/32, 235 yards, TD
Villanova	Rushing	David Avit	14 carries, 65 yards, TD
Villanova	Receiving	Chris Colby	4 receptions, 56 yards
Monmouth	Passing	Derek Robertson	22/23, 358 yards, 3 TD
Monmouth	Rushing	Rodney Nelson	10 carries, 83 yards, TD
Monmouth	Receiving	TJ Speight	7 receptions, 120 yards

=== vs. Delaware (Battle of the Blue) ===
Game Twelve – Delaware Fightin' Blue Hens (9–1) at No. 15 Villanova Wildcats (8–3) – Game summary

Quarter	1	2	3	4	Total
Fightin' Blue Hens	0	21	7	0	28
No. 15 Wildcats	14	7	7	10	38

at Villanova Stadium, Villanova, PA

- Date: Saturday November 23, 2024
- Game time: 1:00 p.m.
- TV announcers (FloSports): TBD

Game information

First quarter
Second quarter
Third quarter
Fourth quarter

Statistics	DEL	VILL
First downs		
Total yards		
Rushing yards		
Passing yards		
Passing: Comp–Att–Int		
Time of possession		

Team	Category	Player	Statistics
Delaware	Passing		
Delaware	Rushing		
Delaware	Receiving		
Villanova	Passing		
Villanova	Rushing		
Villanova	Receiving		

=== vs. No. 22 Eastern Kentucky (NCAA Division I playoff–first round) ===
Game Thirteen – No. 22 Eastern Kentucky (8–4) at No. 12 Villanova Wildcats (9–3) – Game summary

Quarter	1	2	3	4	Total
No. 22 Colonels	14	3	0	0	17
No. 12 Wildcats	0	9	7	6	22

at Villanova Stadium, Villanova, PA

- Date: Saturday November 30, 2024
- Game time: 2:00 p.m.
- TV announcers (ESPN+): Mike Corey (play-by-play) and Jordan Reid (analyst)

Game information

First quarter
Second quarter
Third quarter
Fourth quarter

Statistics	EKU	VILL
First downs		
Total yards		
Rushing yards		
Passing yards		
Passing: Comp–Att–Int		
Time of possession		

Team	Category	Player	Statistics
Eastern Kentucky	Passing		
Eastern Kentucky	Rushing		
Eastern Kentucky	Receiving		
Villanova	Passing		
Villanova	Rushing		
Villanova	Receiving		

=== at No. 6 Incarnate Word (NCAA Division I playoff–second round) ===
Game Fourteen – No. 12 Villanova Wildcats (10–3) at No. 6 Incarnate Word Cardinals (10–2) – Game summary

Quarter	1	2	3	4	Total
No. 12 Wildcats	0	3	3	0	6
No. 6 Cardinals	0	3	0	10	13

at Gayle and Tom Benson Stadium, San Antonio, TX

- Date: Saturday December 7, 2024
- Game time: 1:02 p.m.
- Game weather: Temperature: 46 • Wind: NE 6 mph • Weather: Rain
- Game attendance: 1,926
- Referee: Kelly Holman
- TV: ESPN+
- Box Score AP Recap Villanova Recap

Game information

First quarter

None

Second quarter

- UIW – 8:48 Brack Peacock 23 yard field goal
  UIW 3-0 Drive: 14 plays, 58 yards, 5:46
- VILL – 4:02 Ethan Gettman 49 yard field goal
  Tied 3-3 Drive: 4 plays, 8 yards, 1:08

Third quarter

- VILL – 2:24 Ethan Gettman 52 yard field goal
  VILL 6-3 Drive: 6 plays, 34 yards, 2:02

Fourth quarter

- UIW – 14:08 Roy Alexander 17 yard pass from Zach Calzada, Brack Peacock kick
  UIW 10-6 Drive 8 plays, 77 yards, 0:52
- UIW – 4:14 Brack Peacock 35 yard field goal
  UIW 13-6 Drive: 10 plays, 62 yards, 5:23

Statistics	VILL	UIW
First downs	9	25
Total yards	138	441
Rushing yards	35	259
Passing yards	103	182
Passing: Comp–Att–Int	12–27–1	22–37–0
Time of possession	23:45	36:15

Team	Category	Player	Statistics
Villanova	Passing	Connor Watkins	12/27, 103 yards, INT
Villanova	Rushing	David Avit	10 carries, 36 yards
Villanova	Receiving	Jaylan Sanchez	6 receptions, 54 yards
Incarnate Word	Passing	Zach Calzada	22/37, 182 yards, TD
Incarnate Word	Rushing	Lontrell Turner	18 carries, 120 yards
Incarnate Word	Receiving	Jalen Walthall	6 receptions, 75 yards
