= 2024 Richmond Spiders football team =

American college football season

2024 Richmond Spiders football

CAA co-champion

NCAA Division I First Round, L 16–20 vs. Lehigh
- Conference: CAA Football

Ranking
- STATS: No. 15
- FCS Coaches: No. 16
- Record: 10–3 (8–0 CAA)
- Head coach: Russ Huesman (8th season)
- Offensive coordinator: Winston October (1st season)
- Defensive coordinator: Justin Wood (5th season)
- Home stadium: E. Claiborne Robins Stadium

2024 Coastal Athletic Association Football Conference standings
	Conf.			Overall
Team	W		L	W		L
No. 15 Richmond +^	8	–	0	10	–	3
No. 9 Rhode Island* +^	7	–	1	11	–	3
No. 12 Villanova ^	6	–	2	10	–	4
Delaware*	6	–	2	9	–	2
No. 23 New Hampshire ^	6	–	2	8	–	5
Stony Brook	5	–	3	8	–	4
Towson	5	–	3	7	–	5
Elon	5	–	3	6	–	6
William & Mary	4	–	4	7	–	5
Monmouth	4	–	4	6	–	6
Maine	3	–	5	5	–	7
Albany	2	–	6	4	–	8
Hampton	2	–	6	5	–	7
Campbell	1	–	7	3	–	9
Bryant	0	–	8	2	–	10
North Carolina A&T	0	–	8	1	–	11
+ – Conference co-champions; ^ – FCS playoff participant; * Delaware ineligible for rankings and 2024 FCS playoffs due to transition to the FBS. Richmond and Rhode Island named co-champions as Rhode Island's only CAA loss was to Delaware.; Rankings from STATS Poll

The 2024 Richmond Spiders football team represented the University of Richmond as a member of the Coastal Athletic Association Football Conference (CAA Football, or simply CAA) during the 2024 NCAA Division I FCS football season. The Spiders were led by eighth-year head coach Russ Huesman and played their home games at E. Claiborne Robins Stadium located in Richmond, Virginia.

This was the Spiders' last CAA Football season. In February 2025, Richmond became a football-only member of the Patriot League.

== Schedule ==
Date	Time	Opponent	Rank	Site	TV	Result	Attendance
August 31	6:00 p.m.	at Virginia*	No. 13	Scott Stadium; Charlottesville, VA	ACCNX/ESPN+	L 13–34	40,811
September 7	3:30 p.m.	Wofford*	No. 14	E. Claiborne Robins Stadium; Richmond, VA	FloSports/MSN	L 19–26	5,382
September 14	2:00 p.m.	Charleston Southern*		E. Claiborne Robins Stadium; Richmond, VA	FloSports/MSN	W 38–0	6,522
September 21	6:00 p.m.	at Delaware State*		Alumni Stadium; Dover, DE	ESPN+	W 38–24	2,570
September 28	2:00 p.m.	at Elon		Rhodes Stadium; Elon, NC	FloSports	W 27–17	12,589
October 5	2:00 p.m.	North Carolina A&T		E. Claiborne Robins Stadium; Richmond, VA	FloSports	W 20–17	6,246
October 19	3:30 p.m.	Delaware	No. 18	E. Claiborne Robins Stadium; Richmond, VA	FloSports/MASN	W 28–9	5,382
October 26	noon	at Bryant	No. 18	Beirne Stadium; Smithfield, RI	FloSports/MASN	W 41–14	1,625
November 2	2:00 p.m.	Towson^{†}	No. 16	E. Claiborne Robins Stadium; Richmond, VA	FloSports/MASN	W 35–24	5,778
November 9	3:30 p.m.	at Campbell	No. 13	Barker-Lane Stadium; Buies Creek, NC	FloSports	W 27–24	3,371
November 16	noon	at Hampton	No. 11	Armstrong Stadium; Hampton, VA	FloSports	W 24–21	1,657
November 23	noon	William & Mary	No. 10	E. Claiborne Robins Stadium; Richmond, VA (Capital Cup)	FloSports/MASN	W 27–0	7,526
November 30	2:00 p.m.	Lehigh*	No. 9	E. Claiborne Robins Stadium; Richmond, VA (NCAA Division I First Round)	ESPN+	L 16–20	3,220
*Non-conference game; ^{†}Homecoming; Rankings from STATS Poll released prior to the game; All times are in Eastern time

== Game summaries ==
=== at Virginia (FBS) ===
Game One – No. 13 Richmond Spiders (0–0) vs Virginia Cavaliers (FBS) (0–0) – Game summary

Quarter	1	2	3	4	Total
No. 13 Spiders	0	7	3	3	13
Cavaliers (FBS)	17	10	7	0	34

at Scott Stadium, Charlotte, Virginia

- Date: Saturday August 31, 2024
- Game time: 6:00 PM
- Game weather: Cloudy • Temperature: 84 °F (29 °C) • Wind: N 7 mph
- Game attendance: 40,811
- TV announcers (ACCNX/ESPN+): Chris Carlin, Forrest Conoly

Game information

First quarter

- (11:35) UVA – Trell Harris 35-yard pass from Anthony Colandrea, Will Bettridge kick (Drive: 3 plays, 77 yards, 1:33; Virginia 7–0)
- (6:23) UVA – Will Bettridge 21-yard field goal (Drive: 8 plays, 50 yards, 3:22; Virginia 10–0)
- (2:41) UVA – Jack Griese 57-yard pass from Anthony Colandrea, Will Bettridge kick (Drive: 5 plays, 77 yards, 2:00; Virginia 17–0)

Second quarter

- (11:44) UVA – Will Bettridge 33-yard field goal (Drive: 9 plays, 59 yards, 4:52; Virginia 20–0)
- (4:48) RICH – Kyle Wickersham 5-yard run, Brandon Peskin kick (Drive: 13 plays, 75 yards, 6:56; Virginia 20–7)
- (3:16) UVA – Kobe Pace 3-yard run, Will Bettridge kick (Drive: 4 plays, 54 yards, 1:32; Virginia 27–7)

Third quarter

- (8:31) UVA – Anthony Colandrea 7-yard run, Will Bettridge kick (Drive: 12 plays, 75 yards, 6:29; Virginia 34–7)
- (0:00) RICH – Brandon Peskin 35-yard field goal (Drive: 5 plays, 11 yards, 2:33; Virginia 34–10)

Fourth quarter

- (4:46) RICH – Brandon Peskin 33-yard field goal (Drive: 10 plays, 53 yards, 5:26; Virginia 34–13)

Statistics	RICH	UVA
First downs	13	20
Total yards	257	497
Rushing yards	147	200
Passing yards	110	297
Passing: Comp–Att–Int	13–22–0	17–26–1
Time of possession	30:07	29:53

Team	Category	Player	Statistics
Richmond	Passing	Kyle Wickersham	13–22, 110 yards
Richmond	Rushing	Zach Palmer-Smith	7 carries, 76 yards
Richmond	Receiving	Nick DeGennaro	7 receptions, 74 yards
Virginia	Passing	Anthony Colandrea	17–23, 297 yards, 2 TD
Virginia	Rushing	Kobe Pace	11 carries, 93 yards, 1 TD
Virginia	Receiving	Malachi Fields	5 receptions, 100 yards

=== Wofford ===
Game Two – Wofford Terriers (1–0) at No. 14 Richmond Spiders (0–1) – Game summary

Quarter	1	2	3	4	Total
Terriers	0	10	6	10	26
No. 14 Spiders	2	10	0	7	19

at E. Claiborne Robins Stadium • Richmond, VA

- Date: Saturday September 7, 2024
- Game time: 3:30 p.m.
- Game weather: Cloudy • Temperature: 77 °F (25 °C) • Wind: W 5 mph
- Game attendance: 5,382
- TV: FloSports/MSN

Statistics	WOF	RICH
First downs	15	11
Total yards	304	318
Rushing yards	71	189
Passing yards	233	129
Passing: Comp–Att–Int	17–30–0	15–34–4
Time of possession	27:32	32:28

Team	Category	Player	Statistics
Wofford	Passing	Amari Odom	16–28, 219 yards, 2 TD
Wofford	Rushing	Ryan Ingram	11 carries, 36 yards, TD
Wofford	Receiving	Kyle Watkins	7 receptions, 133 yards
Richmond	Passing	Kyle Wickersham	11–25, 97 yards
Richmond	Rushing	Kyle Wickersham	15 carries, 100 yards
Richmond	Receiving	Matt Robbert	3 receptions, 41 yards

=== Charleston Southern ===
Game Three – Charleston Southern Buccaneers (1–1) at Richmond Spiders (0–2) – Game summary

Quarter	1	2	3	4	Total
Buccaneers	0	0	0	0	0
Spiders	7	14	14	3	38

at E. Claiborne Robins Stadium • Richmond, VA

- Date: Saturday September 14, 2024
- Game time: 2:00 p.m.
- Game weather: Sunny
- Game attendance: 6,522
- Referee: Jeremy DeAngulo
- TV announcers (FloSports/MSN): Bob Black (play-by-play), Chris Anderson (analyst) and Anna Camden (sideline)

Statistics	CHSO	RICH
First downs	10	18
Total yards	131	370
Rushing yards	39	213
Passing yards	92	157
Passing: Comp–Att–Int	11–24–2	13–15–0
Time of possession	26:12	33:48

Team	Category	Player	Statistics
Charleston Southern	Passing	Zolten Osborne	10–19, 81 yards
Charleston Southern	Rushing	Autavius Ison	13 carries, 49 yards
Charleston Southern	Receiving	Quay Kindell	2 receptions, 26 yards
Richmond	Passing	Kyle Wickersham	10–12, 128 yards, 1 TD
Richmond	Rushing	Zach Palmer-Smith	21 carries, 80 yards, 2 TD
Richmond	Receiving	Nick DeGennaro	5 receptions, 71 yards, 1 TD

=== at Delaware State ===
Game Four – Richmond Spiders (1–2) vs Delaware State Hornets (1–2) – Game summary

Quarter	1	2	3	4	Total
Spiders	0	14	14	10	38
Hornets	7	3	7	7	24

at Alumni Stadium, Dover, Delaware

- Date: Saturday September 21, 2024
- Game time: 6:00 PM
- Game weather: Cloudy • Temperature: 75 °F (24 °C) • Wind: E 7 mph
- Game attendance: 2,570
- TV: ESPN+

Statistics	RICH	DSU
First downs	23	18
Total yards	529	375
Rushing yards	217	192
Passing yards	312	183
Passing: Comp–Att–Int	18–33–2	13–18–0
Time of possession	26:23	33:37

Team	Category	Player	Statistics
Richmond	Passing	Camden Coleman	18–33, 312 yards, 2 TD
Richmond	Rushing	Zach Palmer-Smith	32 carries, 207 yards, 1 TD
Richmond	Receiving	Landon Ellis	7 receptions, 131 yards, 1 TD
Delaware State	Passing	Marqui Adams	13–18, 183 yards, 2 TD
Delaware State	Rushing	Marqui Adams	14 carries, 114 yards
Delaware State	Receiving	Kyree Benton	2 receptions, 50 yards, 1 TD

=== at Elon ===
Game Five – Richmond Spiders (2–2) vs Elon Phoenix (1–3) – Game summary

Quarter	1	2	3	4	Total
Spiders	3	17	7	0	27
Phoenix	0	7	3	7	17

at Rhodes Stadium, Elon, North Carolina

- Date: Saturday September 28, 2024
- Game time: 2:00 PM
- Game weather: Cloudy • Temperature: 80 °F (27 °C) • Wind: SW 9 mph
- Game attendance: 12,589
- TV: FloSports

Statistics	RICH	ELON
First downs	20	23
Total yards	439	382
Rushing yards	236	161
Passing yards	203	221
Passing: Comp–Att–Int	15–22–0	19–30–2
Time of possession	30:05	29:55

Team	Category	Player	Statistics
Richmond	Passing	Camden Coleman	15–22, 203 yards
Richmond	Rushing	Zach Palmer-Smith	24 carries, 167 yards, 1 TD
Richmond	Receiving	Landon Ellis	5 receptions, 64 yards
Elon	Passing	Jack Salopek	14–21, 187 yards, 1 TD
Elon	Rushing	Rushawn Baker	9 carries, 66 yards, 1 TD
Elon	Receiving	Chandler Brayboy	6 receptions, 88 yards

=== North Carolina A&T ===
Game Six – North Carolina A&T Aggies (1–4) at Richmond Spiders (3–2) – Game summary

Quarter	1	2	3	4	Total
Aggies	3	7	0	7	17
Spiders	0	10	10	0	20

at E. Claiborne Robins Stadium • Richmond, VA

- Date: Saturday October 5, 2024
- Game time: 2:00 p.m.
- Game weather: Sunny
- Game attendance: 6,246
- TV: FloSports

Statistics	NCAT	RICH
First downs	14	18
Total yards	349	410
Rushing yards	88	286
Passing yards	261	124
Passing: Comp–Att–Int	22–27–0	10–18–0
Time of possession	32:40	27:20

Team	Category	Player	Statistics
North Carolina A&T	Passing	Justin Fomby	22–27, 261 yards, 2 TD
North Carolina A&T	Rushing	Cameren Dalrymple	15 carries, 45 yards
North Carolina A&T	Receiving	Ger-Cari Caldwell	7 receptions, 130 yards
Richmond	Passing	Camden Coleman	10–18, 124 yards
Richmond	Rushing	Zach Palmer-Smith	25 carries, 200 yards, 1 TD
Richmond	Receiving	Matt Robbert	3 receptions, 49 yards

=== Delaware ===
Game Seven – Delaware Fightin' Blue Hens (6–0) at No. 18 Richmond Spiders (4–2) – Game summary

Quarter	1	2	3	4	Total
Fightin' Blue Hens	3	6	0	0	9
No. 18 Spiders	7	21	0	0	28

at E. Claiborne Robins Stadium • Richmond, VA

- Date: Saturday October 19, 2024
- Game time: 3:30 p.m.
- Game weather: Sunny
- Game attendance: 5,382
- Referee: Paul Matt Overton
- TV: FloSports/MASN

Game information
First quarter
- DEL – Nate Reed 33-yard field goal, 10:53. Blue Hens 3–0. Drive: 8 plays, 32 yards, 3:01.
- RICH – Camden Coleman 1-yard run (Brandon Peskin kick), 7:36. Spiders 7–3. Drive: 7 plays, 75 yards, 3:17.

Second quarter

- RICH – Nick DeGennaro 23-yard pass from Camden Coleman (Brandon Peskin kick), 14:56. Spiders 14–3. Drive: 9 plays, 82 yards, 3:43.
- RICH – Zach Palmer-Smith 1-yard run (Brandon Peskin kick), 11:14. Spiders 21–3. Drive: 3 plays, 58 yards, 1:47.
- DEL – Phil Lutz 12-yard pass from Zach Marker (pass failed), 9:05. Spiders 21–9. Drive: 6 plays, 75 yards, 2:09.
- RICH – Matt Robbert 6-yard pass from Camden Coleman (Brandon Peskin kick), 3:07. Spiders 28–9. Drive: 11 plays, 75 yards, 5:58.

Third quarter

- No scoring plays

Fourth quarter

- No scoring plays

Statistics	DEL	RICH
First downs	21	20
Total yards	324	378
Rushing yards	36	184
Passing yards	288	194
Passing: Comp–Att–Int	23–47–1	16–23–0
Time of possession	24:27	35:33

Team	Category	Player	Statistics
Delaware	Passing	Zach Marker	21–43, 251 yards, 1 TD
Delaware	Rushing	Marcus Yarns	7 carries, 31 yards
Delaware	Receiving	Phil Lutz	6 receptions, 93 yards, TD
Richmond	Passing	Camden Coleman	16–23, 194 yards, 2 TD
Richmond	Rushing	Camden Coleman	10 carries, 79 yards, TD
Richmond	Receiving	Nick DeGennaro	4 receptions, 81 yards, TD

=== at Bryant ===
Game Eight – No. 18 Richmond Spiders (5–2) at Bryant Bulldogs (2–5) – Game summary

Quarter	1	2	3	4	Total
No. 18 Spiders	13	28	0	0	41
Bulldogs	7	0	0	7	14

at Beirne Stadium • Smithfield, RI

- Date: Saturday October 26, 2024
- Game time: noon
- Game weather: Sunny • Temperature: 60 °F (16 °C)
- Game attendance: 1,625
- TV: FloSports/MASN

Statistics	RICH	BRY
First downs	25	15
Total yards	527	234
Rushing yards	226	113
Passing yards	301	121
Passing: Comp–Att–Int	19–20–0	8–16–1
Time of possession	35:25	24:35

Team	Category	Player	Statistics
Richmond	Passing	Camden Coleman	15–16, 278 yards, 4 TD
Richmond	Rushing	Aziz Foster-Powell	12 carries, 76 yards
Richmond	Receiving	Nick DeGennaro	7 receptions, 162 yards, TD
Bryant	Passing	Brennan Myer	8–16, 121 yards, 2 TD
Bryant	Rushing	Drew Montez	1 carry, 30 yards
Bryant	Receiving	Landon Ruggieri	3 receptions, 51 yards

=== Towson ===
Game Nine – Towson Tigers (4–4) at No. 16 Richmond Spiders (6–2) – Game summary

Quarter	1	2	3	4	Total
Tigers	0	10	7	7	24
No. 16 Spiders	9	10	3	13	35

at E. Claiborne Robins Stadium • Richmond, VA

- Date: Saturday November 2, 2024
- Game time: 2:00 p.m.
- Game weather: Sunny • Temperature: 66 °F (19 °C) • Wind: N 6 mph
- Game attendance: 5,778
- TV: FloSports/MASN

Statistics	TOW	RICH
First downs	20	19
Total yards	383	347
Rushing yards	108	117
Passing yards	275	230
Passing: Comp–Att–Int	18–30–1	17–26–0
Time of possession	22:46	37:14

Team	Category	Player	Statistics
Towson	Passing	Sean Brown	18–30, 275 yards, TD
Towson	Rushing	Devin Matthews	11 carries, 78 yards, TD
Towson	Receiving	John Dunmore	6 receptions, 123 yards, TD
Richmond	Passing	Camden Coleman	17–26, 230 yards, 2 TD
Richmond	Rushing	Zach Palmer-Smith	28 carries, 98 yards
Richmond	Receiving	Jerry Garcia Jr.	4 receptions, 110 yards

=== at Campbell ===
Game Ten – No. 13 Richmond Spiders (7–2) at Campbell Fighting Camels (3–6) – Game summary

Quarter	1	2	3	4	Total
No. 13 Spiders	0	7	10	10	27
Fighting Camels	7	10	0	7	24

at Barker–Lane Stadium • Buies Creek, NC

- Date: Saturday November 9, 2024
- Game time: 3:30 p.m.
- Game weather: Sunny • Temperature: 70 °F (21 °C) • Wind: SW 10 mph
- Game attendance: 3,371
- TV: FloSports

Statistics	RICH	CAM
First downs	25	18
Total yards	399	401
Rushing yards	147	273
Passing yards	252	128
Passing: Comp–Att–Int	19–33–1	12–24–2
Time of possession	30:59	29:01

Team	Category	Player	Statistics
Richmond	Passing	Camden Coleman	19–33, 252 yards, 2 TD
Richmond	Rushing	Camden Coleman	12 carries, 55 yards
Richmond	Receiving	Landon Ellis	7 receptions, 101 yards
Campbell	Passing	Mike Chandler II	12–24, 128 yards, TD
Campbell	Rushing	Mike Chandler II	17 carries, 121 yards, TD
Campbell	Receiving	Sincere Brown	7 receptions, 62 yards, TD

=== at Hampton ===
Game Eleven – No. 11 Richmond Spiders (8–2) at Hampton Pirates (5–5) – Game summary

Quarter	1	2	3	4	Total
No. 11 Spiders	14	3	7	0	24
Pirates	7	0	7	7	21

at Armstrong Stadium • Hampton, VA

- Date: Saturday November 16, 2024
- Game time: noon
- Game weather: Sunny • Temperature: 61 °F (16 °C) • Wind: W 8 mph
- Game attendance: 1,657
- TV: FloSports

Statistics	RICH	HAMP
First downs	16	24
Total yards	322	391
Rushing yards	184	194
Passing yards	138	197
Passing: Comp–Att–Int	13–18–0	19–31–0
Time of possession	30:27	29:33

Team	Category	Player	Statistics
Richmond	Passing	Camden Coleman	13–18, 138 yards, TD
Richmond	Rushing	Zach Palmer-Smith	27 carries, 166 yards, 2 TD
Richmond	Receiving	Landon Ellis	5 receptions, 70 yards, TD
Hampton	Passing	Malcolm Mays	9–19, 107 yards, TD
Hampton	Rushing	Tymere Robinson	16 carries, 59 yards, TD
Hampton	Receiving	Brennan Ridley	5 receptions, 74 yards, TD

=== William & Mary (Capital Cup) ===
Game Twelve – William & Mary Tribe (7–4) at No. 10 Richmond Spiders (9–2) – Game summary

Quarter	1	2	3	4	Total
Tribe	0	0	0	0	0
No. 10 Spiders	10	7	0	10	27

at E. Claiborne Robins Stadium • Richmond, VA

- Date: Saturday November 23, 2024
- Game time: noon
- Game weather: Sunny
- Game attendance: 7,526
- Referee: Bill McKeever
- TV: FloSports/MASN

Game information

First quarter

- (8:43) RICH – Sean O'Haire 50-yard field goal (Drive: 7 plays, 18 yards, 3:19; Richmond 3–0)
- (2:01) RICH – Camden Coleman 3-yard run, Sean O'Haire kick (Drive: 9 plays, 66 yards, 4:33; Richmond 10–0)

Second quarter

- (2:14) RICH – Camden Coleman 1-yard run, Sean O'Haire kick (Drive: 7 plays, 31 yards, 3:28; Richmond 17–0)

Third quarter

No scoring plays

Fourth quarter

- (14:56) RICH – Sean O'Haire 30-yard field goal (Drive: 16 plays, 57 yards, 9:58; Richmond 20–0)
- (5:54) RICH – Zach Palmer-Smith 1-yard run, Sean O'Haire kick (Drive: 13 plays, 78 yards, 7:05; Richmond 27–0)

Statistics	W&M	RICH
First downs	10	20
Total yards	164	307
Rushing yards	64	238
Passing yards	100	69
Passing: Comp–Att–Int	10–20–1	9–14–1
Time of possession	24:04	35:56

Team	Category	Player	Statistics
William & Mary	Passing	Darius Wilson	9–19, 95 yards
William & Mary	Rushing	Bronson Yoder	7 carries, 32 yards
William & Mary	Receiving	Hollis Mathis	6 receptions, 50 yards
Richmond	Passing	Camden Coleman	9–14, 69 yards
Richmond	Rushing	Zach Palmer-Smith	25 carries, 129 yards, 1 TD
Richmond	Receiving	Ja'Vion Griffin	3 receptions, 29 yards

=== Lehigh—NCAA Division I First Round ===
First Round – Lehigh Mountain Hawks (8–3) at No. 9 Richmond Spiders (10–2) – Game summary

Quarter	1	2	3	4	Total
Mountain Hawks	0	7	0	13	20
No. 9 Spiders	3	6	0	7	16

at E. Claiborne Robins Stadium • Richmond, VA

- Date: Saturday November 30, 2024
- Game time: 2:00 p.m.
- Game weather: Sunny • Temperature: 41 °F (5 °C) • Wind: W 10 mph
- Game attendance: 3,220
- TV announcers (ESPN+): Jason Ross Jr. (play-by-play) and Tyoka Jackson (analyst)

Game information

First quarter

- (7:03) RICH - Sean O'Haire 25 yard field goal (Drive: 15 plays, 76 yards, 7:57 Richmond 3-0)

Second quarter

- (5:27) RICH - Sean O'Haire 27 yard field goal (Drive: 17 plays, 70 yards, 8:43 Richmond 6-0)
- (1:04) LEH - Logan Galletta 7 yard pass from Hayden Johnson, Nick Garrido kick (Drive: 9 plays, 82 yards, 4:23 Lehigh 7-6)
- (0:00) RICH - Sean O'Haire 21 yard field goal (Drive: 8 plays, 64 yards, 1:04 Richmond 9-7)

Third quarter
Fourth quarter

- (10:36) RICH - Sean Clarke 7 yard pass from Camden Coleman, Sean O'Haire kick (Drive: 5 plays, 39 yards, 1:43 Richmond 16-7)
- (10:25) LEH - Jaden Green 65 yard run, Nick Garrido kick (Drive: 1 play, 65 yards, 0:11 Richmond 16-14)
- (6:21) LEH - Geoffrey Jamiel 54 yard pass from Hayden Johnson, two-point conversion failed (Drive: 5 plays, 65 yards, 3:13 Lehigh 20-16)

Statistics	LEH	RICH
First downs	16	18
Total yards	328	345
Rushing yards	128	146
Passing yards	200	199
Passing: Comp–Att–Int	15–20–2	24–38–0
Time of possession	29:48	30:12

Team	Category	Player	Statistics
Lehigh	Passing	Hayden Johnson	14–18, 199 yards, 2 TD
Lehigh	Rushing	Jaden Green	11 carries, 70 yards, TD
Lehigh	Receiving	Geoffrey Jamiel	10 receptions, 137 yards, TD
Richmond	Passing	Camden Coleman	24–37, 199 yards, TD
Richmond	Rushing	Zach Palmer-Smith	22 carries, 107 yards
Richmond	Receiving	Landon Ellis	12 receptions, 76 yards

== Ranking movements ==
Ranking movements Legend: ██ Increase in ranking ██ Decrease in ranking RV = Received votes т = Tied with team above or below
	Week														
Poll	Pre	1	2	3	4	5	6	7	8	9	10	11	12	13	Final
STATS FCS	13	14	RV	RV	RV	RV	21	18	18	16	13	11	10	9	15
Coaches	12	15	RV	RV	23т	21	17	15	13	12	9	7	7	7	16
