= Yank Townsend Trophy =

American football award

- Lehigh Mountain Hawks Yale Bulldogs
- Sport: Football
- Location: Northeast United States
- Stadiums: Goodman Stadium; Yale Bowl
- Trophy: Yank Townsend Trophy

Statistics
- Total meetings: 28
- Most wins: Yale
- All-time record: 20–8
- All-time series (Patriot League, Ivy League only): 8–3
- Largest victory: Yale 34–0
- Smallest victory: Yale 26–20
- Longest win streak: 3 (Yale)
- Current win streak: 1 (Lehigh)

Locations of Lehigh and Yale

The Yank Townsend Trophy is an award created in 2006 and given to the winner of Lehigh–Yale Football games.

== History ==
Both Yale, founded in 1701, and Lehigh, founded in 1865, were early adopters of Football with both schools running powerhouse teams through the 19th century. Both schools participate in the oldest rivalries in the sport, with Lehigh's rivalry with Lafayette (Note: Formerly the longest running rivalry in College Football, until the 2020 game was cancelled due to COVID-19) and Yale's rivalry with Harvard being the most played, and third most played, rivalries in college football respectively. The Yank Townsend Trophy was created in 2006 at the urging of Alumni from both schools to commemorate "the lifetime achievements of their graduates, and the generations of families that have attended both universities." The trophy is named after Charles "Yank" Townsend (1873–1963), the only resident of Connecticut in Lehigh's class of 1895 who operated an architecture and engineering firm Norton & Townsend which designed buildings across the east coast. After his graduation from Lehigh Townsend worked in New Haven where he was a prominent member of the local community, and a Freemason. Townsend was a major Booster for both the Lehigh Engineers (Note: In 1995 Lehigh changed their mascot name to the Mountain Hawk) and Yale Bulldogs and was heavily involved in both schools athletic programs. Yale would win the first trophy game 26–20 in overtime.

=== 2016 and 2017 games ===
Described as "mirror images" of each other, Lehigh would comprehensibly defeat Yale 63–35 in the 2016 meeting between the two teams, just for the following season seeing Yale beat Lehigh 56–28. In 2016, the 98 points scored by both teams is the most ever scored at the Yale Bowl. Lehigh would throw for 524 yards and 6 passing touchdowns, with one of Yale's touchdowns being a punt return. Lehigh's Quarterback Brad Mayes would set a school record for passing yards, surpassing the previous record of 480 set in 1998 by Scott Semptimphelter, and would tie for first in passing touchdowns.

However, the next meeting between the two teams in 2017 would see Yale rout Lehigh. Lehigh had closed to within 28–21 56 seconds into the third quarter, however, Yale would score twice in six minutes to put the game away. Yale's Quarterback Kurt Rawlings went 20-for-26 with 308 yards and threw for 4 Touchdowns, while Lehigh's Brad Mayes went 18-for-31 with 304 yards and threw for 3 touchdowns. Yale would also capitalize on two Lehigh turnovers. Lehigh's coach Andy Coen went on record saying "They looked like a whole different team out there... They weren't a very good football team last year."

== List of games ==
The overall record for the Yale–Lehigh series is 20–8 in Yale's favor, however, the trophy was only created in 2006, with games before then not counting for the rivalry's series.

Lehigh victories	Yale victories	Tie games

No.	Date	Location	Winner	Score
1	October 14, 2006	New Haven, Connecticut	Yale	26–20
2	October 13, 2007	New Haven, Connecticut	Yale	23–7
3	October 17, 2009	Lower Saucon, Pennsylvania (Note: Lehigh is associated with the location of its main academic campus, Bethlehem, Pennsylvania, however, its athletic campus is in neighboring Lower Saucon)	Yale	7–0
4	October 11, 2011	Lower Saucon, Pennsylvania	Lehigh	37–7
5	October 18, 2014	New Haven, Connecticut	Yale	54–43
6	October 3, 2015	Lower Saucon, Pennsylvania	Yale	27–12
7	October 1, 2016	New Haven, Connecticut	Lehigh	63–35
8	September 16, 2017	Lower Saucon, Pennsylvania	Yale	56–28
9	October 2, 2021	Lower Saucon, Pennsylvania	Yale	34–0
10	October 19, 2024	New Haven, Connecticut	Yale	38–23
11	October 4, 2025	Lower Saucon, Pennsylvania	Lehigh	31–13
Series: Yale leads 8–3
