= Robert Lee (sports announcer) =

American sportscaster

- Born: 1976 or 1977 (age 49–50)
- Education: BS (Broadcast Journalism) Syracuse University
- Occupation: sports announcer
- Years active: 2000-present
- Children: 1
- Sports commentary career
- Genre: Play-by-play
- Sports: College Football, College basketball, High School football
- Employer: ESPN, Time Warner and Siena College

Robert Lee is an American sportscaster for ESPN.

== Early life ==
From 1995 to 1999, Lee attended Syracuse University, where he received B.S. in Broadcast Journalism from the S.I. Newhouse School of Public Communications.

== Early career ==
Lee was formerly the Assistant Sports Information Director for Siena College. He was the main primary television, newspaper and radio media contact for seven of Siena's athletic programs. Lee was also a daily television show host for Capital OTB during 2012 Saratoga horse racing season. There he conducted interviews with trainers, jockeys and other horse professionals.

== Sports broadcasting ==
Since 2000, Lee has been the play-by-play announcer for Siena's Men’s Basketball team on television and radio. He also hosted a weekly radio show with interviews with Siena's basketball coaches. As well as calling men's basketball for Siena's Men's Basketball team, Lee also is an announcer for Time Warner and ESPN. Lee started announcing football and basketball games for Time Warner in 2003 and for ESPN in 2016. In his time at ESPN, Lee has called games online for ESPN 3 or on national television for ESPNU. Lee has called games for conferences including the Big South, MAAC, Ohio Valley Conference, ACC, American Athletic Conference and the A-10. He has also called several FCS football playoff games.

== Removal from University of Virginia game assignment ==
In August 2017, after the Charlottesville Unite the Right rally protesting the removal of a statue of Confederate general Robert E. Lee turned violent, ESPN removed Lee from covering the September 2 football game at the William & Mary-Virginia game in Charlottesville, reassigning him to the Youngstown State-Pittsburgh game. The decision was leaked to Clay Travis's website Outkick the Coverage, and had some ridicule on social media. ESPN released a statement saying the assignment switch came "simply because of the coincidence of his name."

== Personal life ==
Lee currently lives in Albany, New York with his wife and daughter. He is fluent in Mandarin.
