= 2024 South Carolina State Bulldogs football team =

American college football season

2024 South Carolina State Bulldogs football

MEAC champion

Celebration Bowl, L 7–28 vs. Jackson State
- Conference: Mid-Eastern Athletic Conference

Ranking
- STATS: No. 24
- FCS Coaches: No. 20
- Record: 9–3 (5–0 MEAC)
- Head coach: Chennis Berry (1st season)
- Offensive coordinator: Johnathan Williams (1st season)
- Offensive scheme: Spread option
- Defensive coordinator: Jordan Odaffer (1st season)
- Base defense: Multiple 4–2–5
- Home stadium: Oliver C. Dawson Stadium

2024 Mid-Eastern Athletic Conference football standings
| | Conf. | | | Overall |
| Team | W | | L | W | | L |
|---|---|---|---|---|---|---|
| No. 24 South Carolina State $ | 5 | – | 0 | 9 | – | 3 |
| North Carolina Central | 4 | – | 1 | 8 | – | 3 |
| Morgan State | 3 | – | 2 | 6 | – | 6 |
| Norfolk State | 2 | – | 3 | 4 | – | 8 |
| Howard | 1 | – | 4 | 4 | – | 8 |
| Delaware State | 0 | – | 5 | 1 | – | 11 |
$ – Conference champion; Rankings from STATS Poll

The 2024 South Carolina State Bulldogs football team represented South Carolina State University as a member of the Mid-Eastern Athletic Conference (MEAC) during the 2024 NCAA Division I FCS football season. The Bulldogs were led by first-year head coach Chennis Berry, replacing longtime coach Oliver Pough who retired after last season. South Carolina State played their home games at Oliver C. Dawson Stadium in Orangeburg, South Carolina.

== Schedule ==
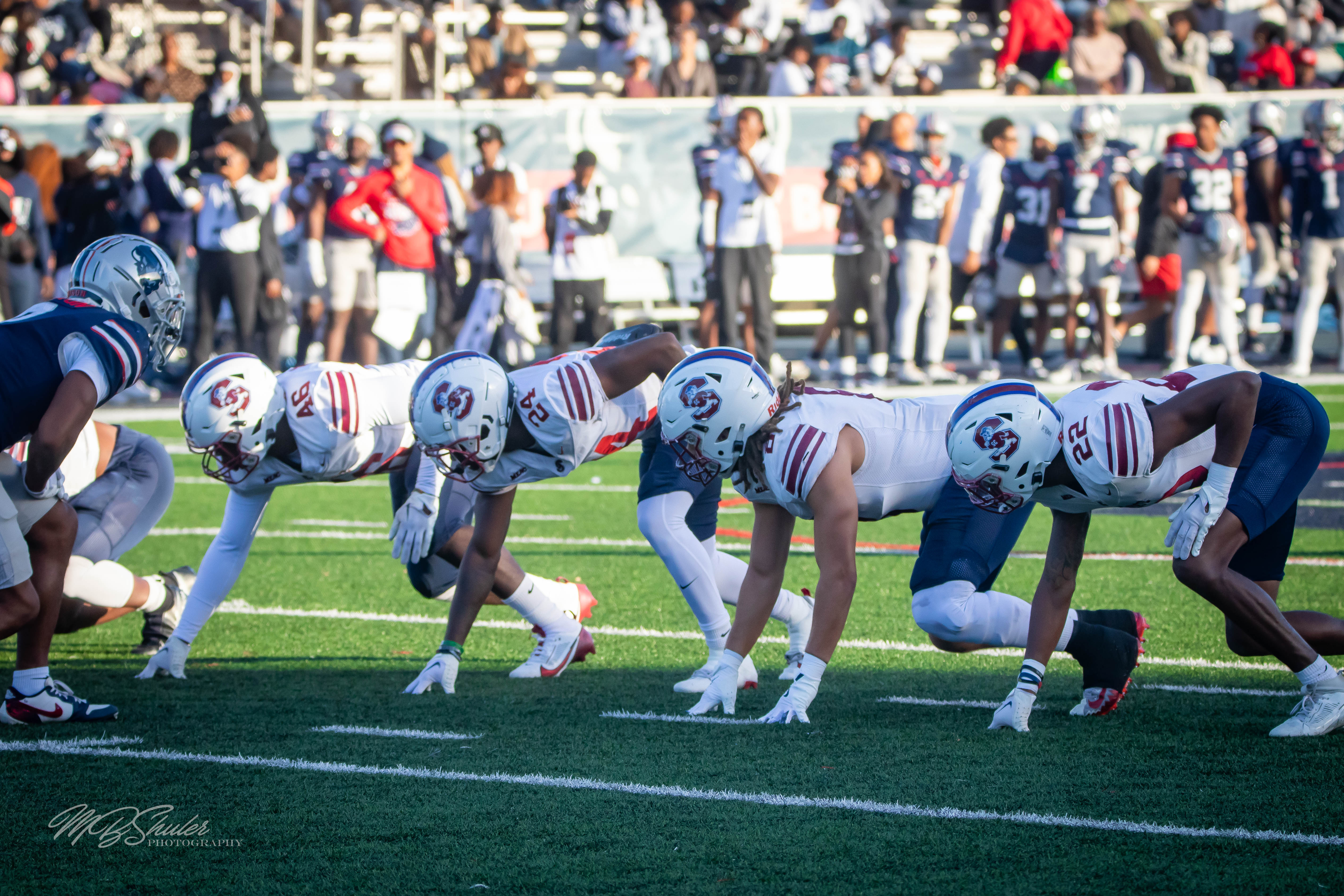
2024 SC State University Football Team

| Date | Time | Opponent | Rank | Site | TV | Result | Attendance |
|---|---|---|---|---|---|---|---|
| August 31 | 6:00 p.m. | at Florida A&M* | | Bragg Memorial Stadium; Tallahassee, FL | ESPN+ | L 18–22 | 15,930 |
| September 7 | 12:00 p.m. | at The Citadel* | | Johnson Hagood Stadium; Charleston, SC | ESPN+ | W 23–20 | 10,579 |
| September 14 | 6:00 p.m. | at Georgia Southern* | | Paulson Stadium; Statesboro, GA | ESPN+ | L 14–42 | 21,617 |
| September 28 | 6:00 p.m. | North Carolina A&T* | | Oliver C. Dawson Stadium; Orangeburg, SC (rivalry) | ESPN+ | W 45–25 | 15,126 |
| October 5 | 1:30 p.m. | at Tennessee Tech* | | Tucker Stadium; Cookeville, TN | ESPN+ | W 22–20 | 5,974 |
| October 19 | 2:00 p.m. | Fort Valley State* | | Oliver C. Dawson Stadium; Orangeburg, SC | ESPN+ | W 30–3 | 12,179 |
| October 26 | 3:30 p.m. | Delaware State^{†} | | Oliver C. Dawson Stadium; Orangeburg, SC | ESPN+ | W 69–35 | 22,169 |
| October 31 | 7:30 p.m. | No. 19 North Carolina Central | | Oliver C. Dawson Stadium; Orangeburg, SC | ESPN2 | W 24–21 | 11,169 |
| November 9 | 3:30 p.m. | at Howard | | William H. Greene Stadium; Washington, D.C. | ESPN+ | W 38–14 | 3,891 |
| November 16 | 1:00 p.m. | at Morgan State | | Hughes Stadium; Baltimore, MD | ESPN+ | W 54–7 | 1,265 |
| November 23 | 1:30 p.m. | Norfolk State | No. 23 | Oliver C. Dawson Stadium; Orangeburg, SC | ESPN+ | W 53–21 | 9,169 |
| December 14 | 12:00 p.m. | vs. No. 18 Jackson State | No. 20 | Mercedes-Benz Stadium; Atlanta, GA (Celebration Bowl) | ABC | L 7–28 | 36,823 |
*Non-conference game; ^{†}Homecoming; Rankings from STATS Poll released prior to the game; All times are in Eastern time

== Game summaries ==
=== at Florida A&M ===
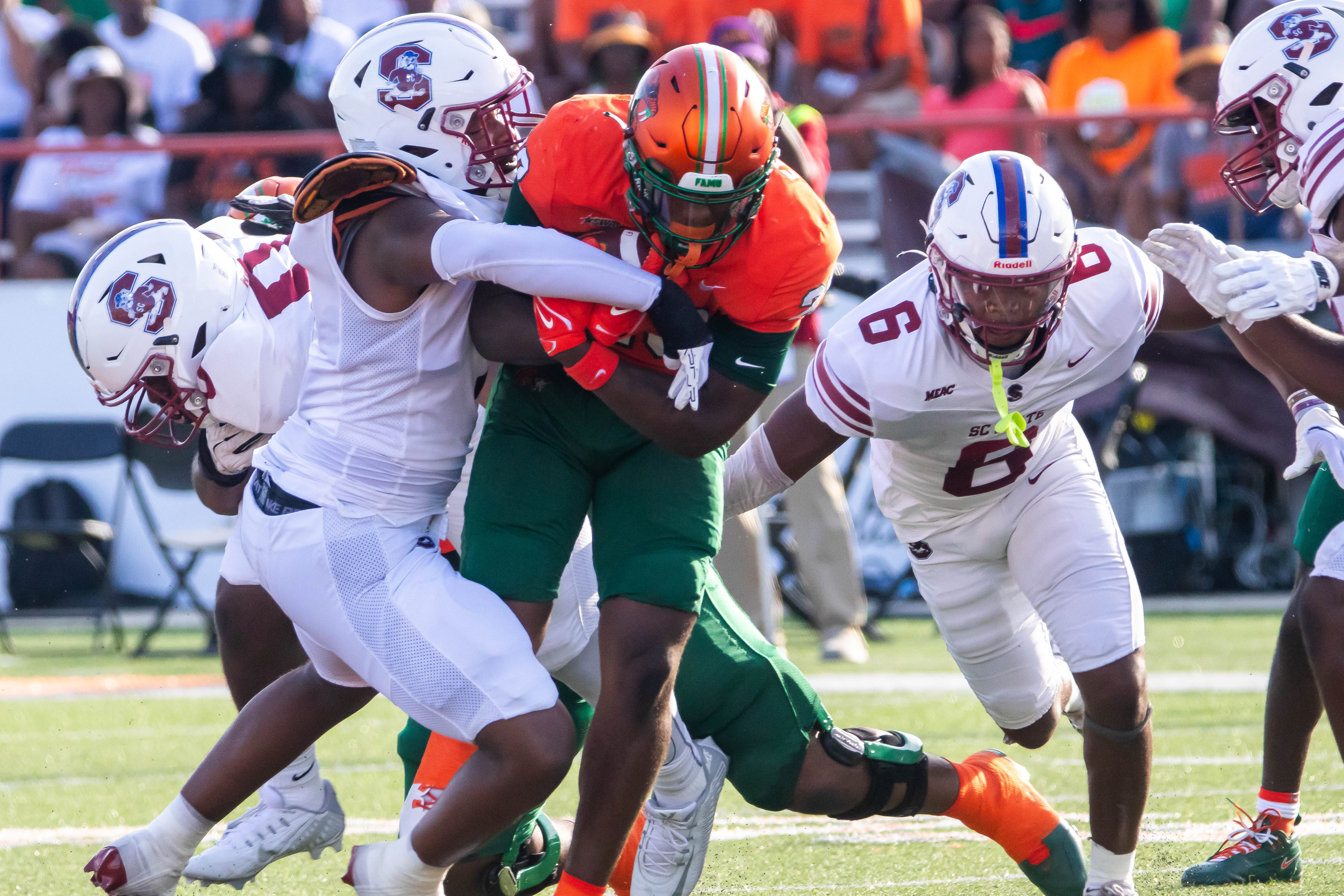
SC State vs Florida A&M in 2024

Game One – South Carolina State Bulldogs (0–0) vs Florida A&M Rattlers (1–0) – Game summary

| Quarter | 1 | 2 | 3 | 4 | Total |
|---|---|---|---|---|---|
| Bulldogs | 3 | 3 | 6 | 6 | 18 |
| Rattlers | 0 | 7 | 0 | 15 | 22 |

at Bragg Memorial Stadium • Tallahassee, Florida

- Date: August 31, 2024
- Game time: 6:00 p.m.
- Game weather: Sunny, 93 °F (34 °C)
- Game attendance: 15,930
- Referee: Y.N. Myers III
- TV announcers (ESPN+): Noah Reed (play-by-play) and Byron Chamberlain (analyst)

Game information

First quarter

- (0:49) SCST – Kyle Gallegos 35-yard field goal (Drive: 12 plays, 73 yards, 7:17; South Carolina State 3–0)

Second quarter

- (10:52) FA&M – Koby Gross 29-yard pass from Daniel Richardson, Cameron Gillis kick (Drive: 11 plays, 80 yards, 4:53; Florida A&M 7–3)
- (0:00) SCST – Kyle Gallegos 37-yard field goal (Drive: 9 plays, 61 yards, 1:48; Florida A&M 7–6)

Third quarter

- (1:08) SCST – KZ Adams 8-yard pass from Eric Phoenix (Drive: 12 plays, 80 yards, 5:15; South Carolina State 12–7)

Fourth quarter

- (12:14) SCST – Josh Shaw 1-yard run (Drive: 7 plays, 48 yards, 3:01; South Carolina State 18–7)
- (10:32) FA&M – Karter Johnson 7-yard pass from Daniel Richardson, Koby Gross pass (Drive: 4 plays, 74 yards, 1:34; South Carolina State 18–15)
- (5:39) FA&M – Thad Franklin Jr. 6-yard pass from Daniel Richardson, Cameron Gillis kick (Drive: 9 plays, 84 yards, 3:33; Florida A&M 22–18)

| Statistics | SCST | FAMU |
|---|---|---|
| First downs | 19 | 26 |
| Total yards | 286 | 415 |
| Rushing yards | 154 | 133 |
| Passing yards | 132 | 282 |
| Passing: Comp–Att–Int | 12–26–0 | 23–38–0 |
| Time of possession | 27:21 | 31:31 |

| Team | Category | Player | Statistics |
|---|---|---|---|
| South Carolina State | Passing | Eric Phoenix | 12/25, 132 yards, TD |
| South Carolina State | Rushing | Deondra Duehart | 10 carries, 74 yards |
| South Carolina State | Receiving | Caden High | 3 receptions, 49 yards |
| Florida A&M | Passing | Daniel Richardson | 23/38, 282 yards, 3 TD |
| Florida A&M | Rushing | Levontai Summersett | 11 carries, 62 yards |
| Florida A&M | Receiving | Koby Gross | 6 receptions, 106 yards, TD |

=== at The Citadel ===
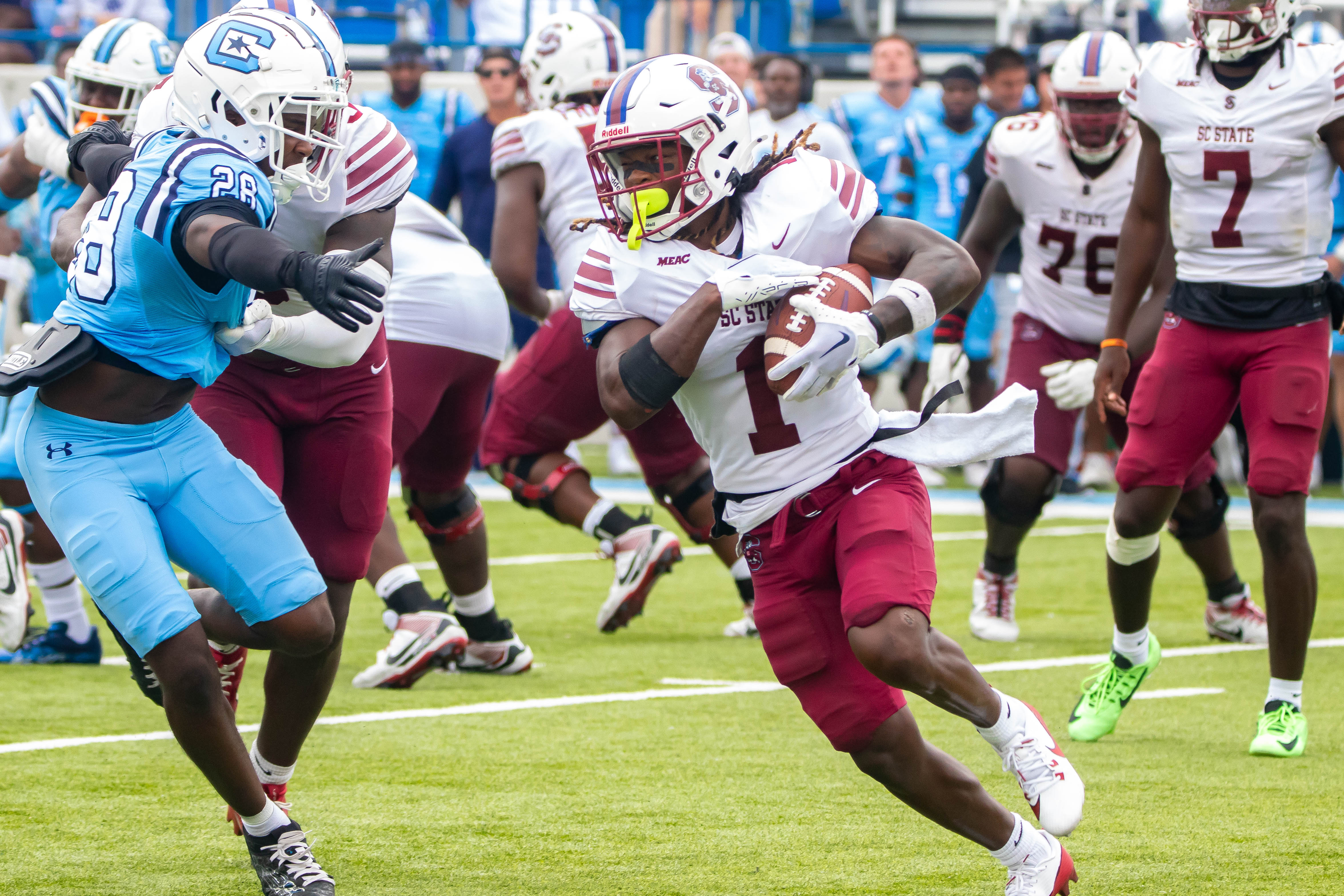
SC State vs The Citadel in 2024

Game Two – South Carolina State Bulldogs (0–1) vs The Citadel Bulldogs (1–0) – Game summary

| Quarter | 1 | 2 | 3 | 4 | Total |
|---|---|---|---|---|---|
| South Carolina State | 3 | 6 | 7 | 7 | 23 |
| The Citadel | 3 | 0 | 10 | 7 | 20 |

at Johnson Hagood Stadium • Charleston, SC

- Date: Saturday September 7, 2024
- Game time: 12:00 p.m.
- Game weather: Cloudy
- Game attendance: 10,579
- Referee: Jake Grombach
- TV announcers (ESPN+): Dave Weinstein (play-by-play), Vad Lee (analyst) and Ainsley Clifford (sideline)

Game information

First quarter

- (7:49) SCST – Kyle Gallegos 30-yard field goal (Drive: 14 plays, 62 yards, 7:11; South Carolina State 3–0)
- (3:34) CIT – Ben Barnes 47-yard field goal (Drive: 7 plays, 16 yards, 4:05; Tied 3–3)

Second quarter

- (0:21) SCST – Caden High 10-yard pass from Eric Phoenix (Drive: 12 plays, 87 yards, 4:20; South Carolina State 9–3)

Third quarter

- (11:33) CIT – Ben Barnes 38-yard field goal (Drive: 6 plays, 56 yards, 3:27; South Carolina State 9–6)
- (5:30) SCST – Josh Shaw 1-yard run, Kyle Gallegos kick (Drive: 13 plays, 87 yards, 6:03; South Carolina State 16–6)
- (2:08) CIT – Saul Diaz 10-yard pass from Johnathan Bennett, Ben Barnes kick (Drive: 8 plays, 75 yards, 3:22; South Carolina State 16–13)

Fourth quarter

- (13:23) SCST – Josh Shaw 1-yard run, Kyle Gallegos kick (Drive: 8 plays, 63 yards, 3:35; South Carolina State 23–13)
- (11:30) CIT – Johnathan Bennett 1-yard run, Ben Barnes kick (Drive: 3 plays, 57 yards, 1:44; South Carolina State 23–20)

| Statistics | SCST | CIT |
|---|---|---|
| First downs | 26 | 10 |
| Total yards | 421 | 275 |
| Rushing yards | 217 | 106 |
| Passing yards | 204 | 169 |
| Passing: Comp–Att–Int | 19–26–0 | 13–22–1 |
| Time of possession | 36:13 | 23:47 |

| Team | Category | Player | Statistics |
|---|---|---|---|
| South Carolina State | Passing | Eric Phoenix | 18/23, 194 yards, TD |
| South Carolina State | Rushing | Deondra Duehart | 18 carries, 128 yards |
| South Carolina State | Receiving | Justin Smith-Brown | 5 receptions, 94 yards |
| The Citadel | Passing | Johnathan Bennett | 13/22, 169 yards, TD, INT |
| The Citadel | Rushing | Corey Ibrahim | 7 carries, 52 yards |
| The Citadel | Receiving | Dervon Pesnell | 2 receptions, 72 yards |

=== at Georgia Southern (FBS) ===
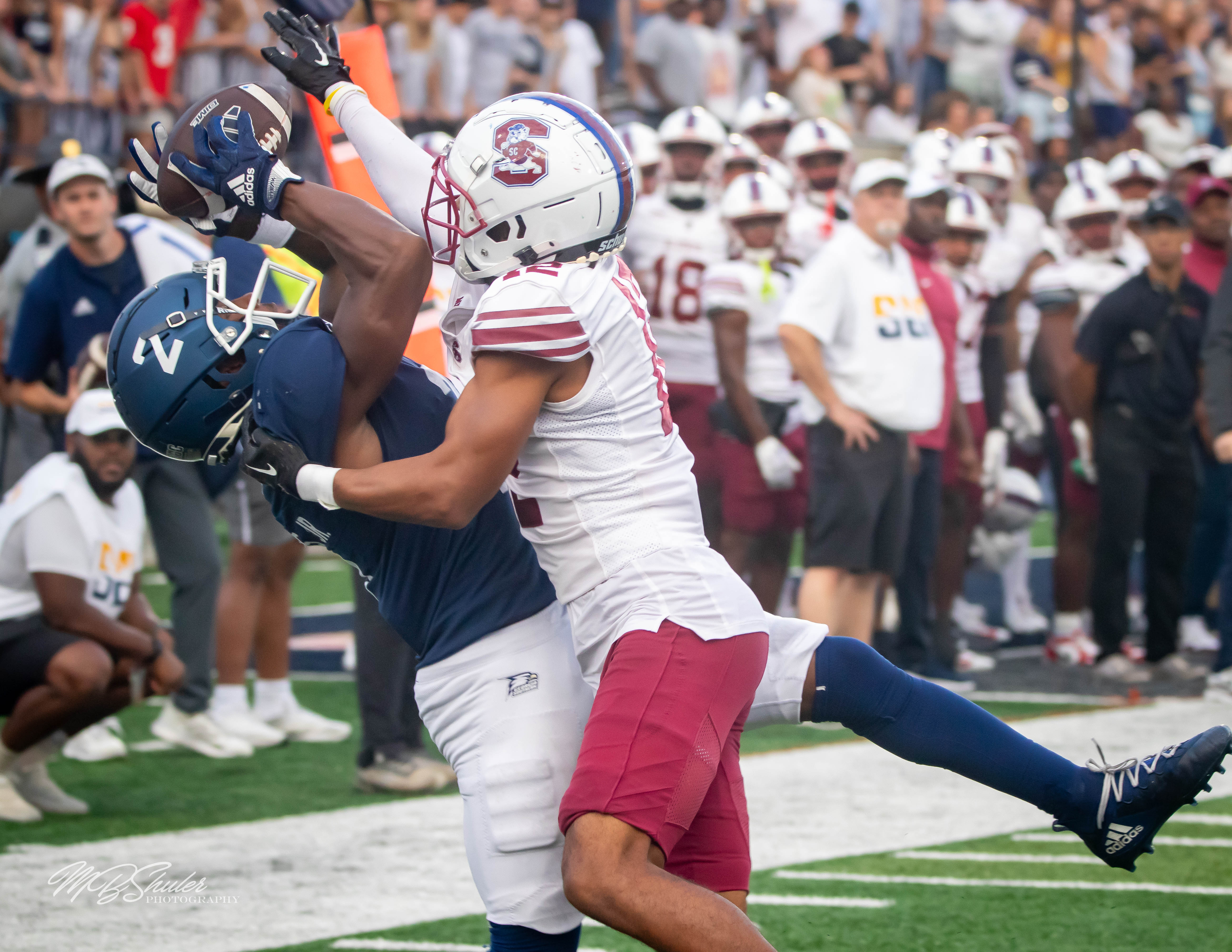
SC State at Georgia Southern in 2024

Game Three – South Carolina State Bulldogs (1–1) vs Georgia Southern Eagles (FBS) (1–1) – Game summary

| Quarter | 1 | 2 | 3 | 4 | Total |
|---|---|---|---|---|---|
| Bulldogs | 0 | 7 | 7 | 0 | 14 |
| Eagles (FBS) | 7 | 14 | 14 | 7 | 42 |

at Paulson Stadium • Statesboro, GA

- Date: Saturday September 14, 2024
- Game time: 6:00 p.m.
- Game weather: Cloudy • Temperature: 76 °F (24 °C)
- Game attendance: 21,617
- Referee: Steven Robinson
- TV announcers (ESPN+): Danny Waugh (play-by-play) and Jared Denk (analyst)

Game information

First quarter

- (8:36) GASO – Tyler Fromm 13-yard pass from JC French, Gavin Stewart kick (Drive: 8 plays, 49 yards, 3:05; Georgia Southern 7–0)

Second quarter

- (13:39) SCST – Deondra Duehart 4-yard run, Kyle Gallegos kick (Drive: 11 plays, 73 yards, 5:13; Tied 7–7)
- (12:07) GASO – Jalen White 1-yard run, Gavin Stewart kick (Drive: 4 plays, 65 yards, 1:26; Georgia Southern 14–7)
- (7:07) GASO – OJ Arnold 14-yard pass from JC French, Gavin Stewart kick (Drive: 6 plays, 50 yards, 3:26; Georgia Southern 21–7)

Third quarter

- (13:27) GASO – OJ Arnold 15-yard run, Gavin Stewart kick (Drive: 5 plays, 59 yards, 1:28; Georgia Southern 28–7)
- (10:48) GASO – Tracy Hill Jr. 60-yard interception, Gavin Stewart kick (Georgia Southern 35–7)
- (5:11) SCST – Deondra Duehart 1-yard run, Gavyn Zimmerman kick (Drive: 9 plays, 75 yards, 5:37; Georgia Southern 35–14)

Fourth quarter

- (2:47) GASO – Jalen White 2-yard run, Gavin Stewart kick (Drive: 13 plays, 80 yards, 8:10; Georgia Southern 42–14)

| Statistics | SCST | GASO |
|---|---|---|
| First downs | 19 | 21 |
| Total yards | 318 | 351 |
| Rushing yards | 112 | 140 |
| Passing yards | 206 | 211 |
| Passing: Comp–Att–Int | 24–38–1 | 17–24–0 |
| Time of possession | 32:38 | 27:22 |

| Team | Category | Player | Statistics |
|---|---|---|---|
| South Carolina State | Passing | Eric Phoenix | 24/37, 206 yards, INT |
| South Carolina State | Rushing | Eric Phoenix | 8 carries, 63 yards |
| South Carolina State | Receiving | Caden High | 10 receptions, 81 yards |
| Georgia Southern | Passing | JC French | 17/23, 211 yards, 2 TD |
| Georgia Southern | Rushing | OJ Arnold | 4 carries, 42 yards, TD |
| Georgia Southern | Receiving | Josh Dallas | 1 reception, 58 yards |

=== vs. North Carolina A&T (rivalry) ===
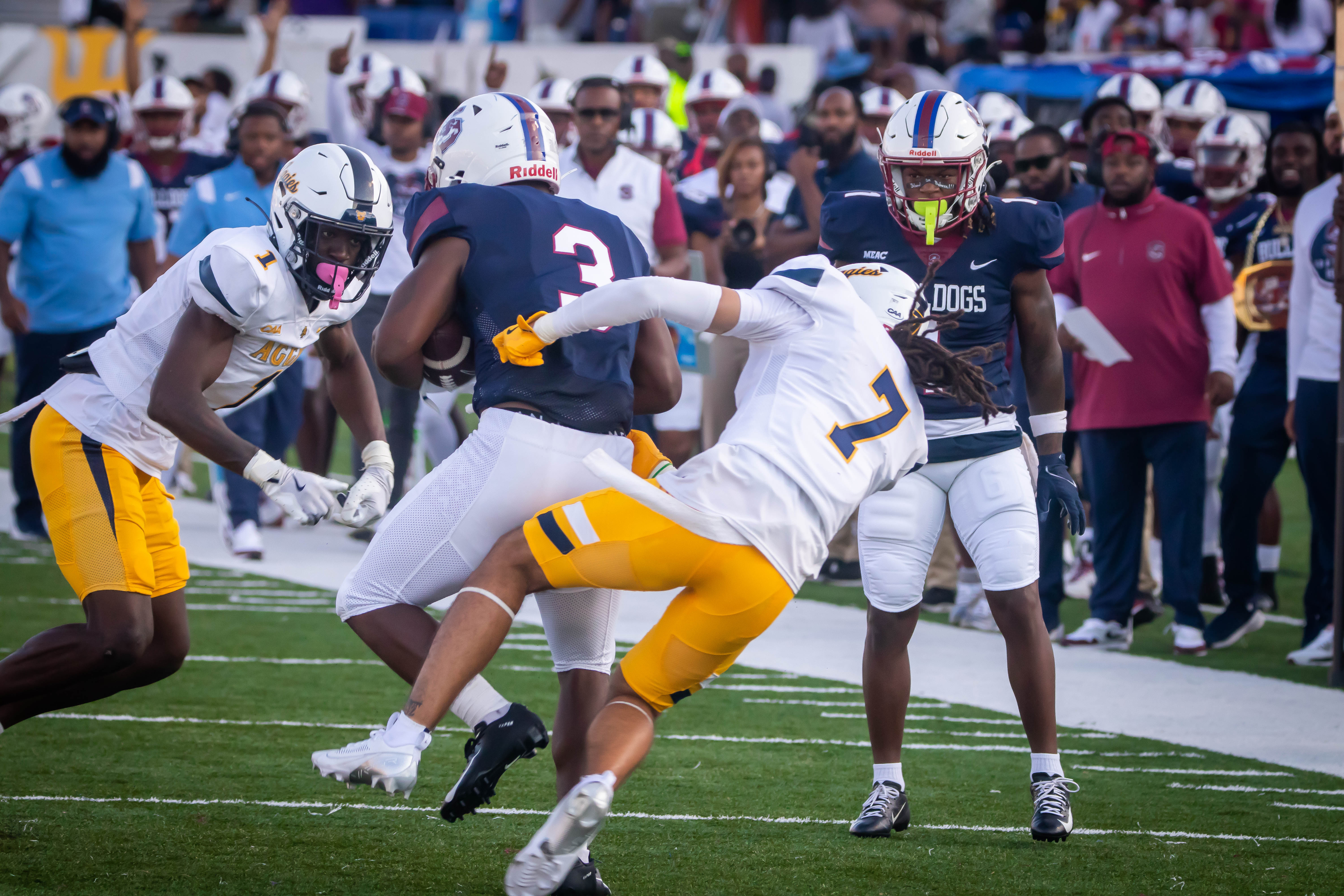
NC A&T vs SC State University in 2024

Game Four – North Carolina A&T Aggies (1–3) at South Carolina State Bulldogs (1–2) – Game summary

| Quarter | 1 | 2 | 3 | 4 | Total |
|---|---|---|---|---|---|
| Aggies | 0 | 0 | 0 | 0 | 0 |
| Bulldogs | 0 | 0 | 0 | 0 | 0 |

at Oliver C. Dawson Stadium • Orangeburg, South Carolina

- Date: Saturday September 28, 2024
- Game time: 6:00 p.m.
- TV: ESPN+

Game information

First quarter
Second quarter
Third quarter
Fourth quarter

| Statistics | NCAT | SCST |
|---|---|---|
| First downs | | |
| Total yards | | |
| Rushing yards | | |
| Passing yards | | |
| Passing: Comp–Att–Int | | |
| Time of possession | | |

| Team | Category | Player | Statistics |
|---|---|---|---|
| North Carolina A&T | Passing | | |
| North Carolina A&T | Rushing | | |
| North Carolina A&T | Receiving | | |
| South Carolina State | Passing | | |
| South Carolina State | Rushing | | |
| South Carolina State | Receiving | | |

=== at Tennessee Tech ===
Game Five – South Carolina State Bulldogs (2–2) vs Tennessee Tech Golden Eagles (2–2) – Game summary

| Quarter | 1 | 2 | 3 | 4 | Total |
|---|---|---|---|---|---|
| Bulldogs | 0 | 0 | 0 | 0 | 0 |
| Golden Eagles | 0 | 0 | 0 | 0 | 0 |

at Tucker Stadium • Cookeville, Tennessee

- Date: Saturday October 5, 2024
- Game time: 1:30 p.m.
- Game weather: 0 °F (−18 °C)
- TV: ESPN+

Game information

First quarter
Second quarter
Third quarter
Fourth quarter

| Statistics | SCST | TNTC |
|---|---|---|
| First downs | | |
| Total yards | | |
| Rushing yards | | |
| Passing yards | | |
| Passing: Comp–Att–Int | | |
| Time of possession | | |

| Team | Category | Player | Statistics |
|---|---|---|---|
| South Carolina State | Passing | | |
| South Carolina State | Rushing | | |
| South Carolina State | Receiving | | |
| Tennessee Tech | Passing | | |
| Tennessee Tech | Rushing | | |
| Tennessee Tech | Receiving | | |

=== vs. Fort Valley State (DII) ===
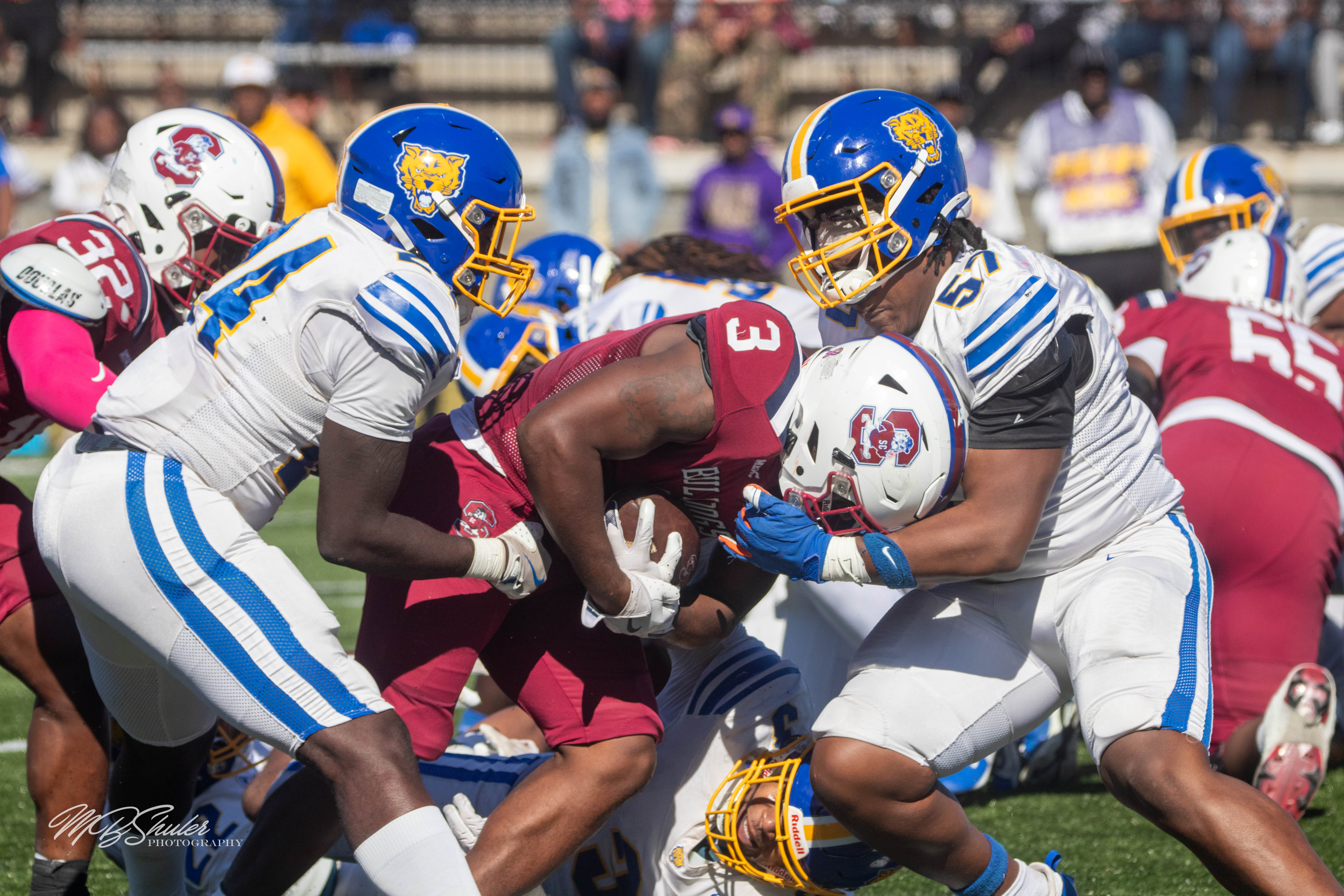
Fort Valley State University vs SC State University in 2024

Game Six – Fort Valley State Wildcats (DII) (4–2) vs South Carolina State Bulldogs (3–2) – Game summary

| Quarter | 1 | 2 | 3 | 4 | Total |
|---|---|---|---|---|---|
| Wildcats (DII) | 0 | 0 | 0 | 0 | 0 |
| Bulldogs | 0 | 0 | 0 | 0 | 0 |

at Oliver C. Dawson Stadium, Orangeburg, South Carolina

- Date: Saturday October 19, 2024
- Game time: 2:00 PM
- TV: ESPN+

Game information

First quarter
Second quarter
Third quarter
Fourth quarter

| Statistics | FVS | SCST |
|---|---|---|
| First downs | | |
| Total yards | | |
| Rushing yards | | |
| Passing yards | | |
| Passing: Comp–Att–Int | | |
| Time of possession | | |

| Team | Category | Player | Statistics |
|---|---|---|---|
| Fort Valley State | Passing | | |
| Fort Valley State | Rushing | | |
| Fort Valley State | Receiving | | |
| South Carolina State | Passing | | |
| South Carolina State | Rushing | | |
| South Carolina State | Receiving | | |

=== vs. Delaware State ===
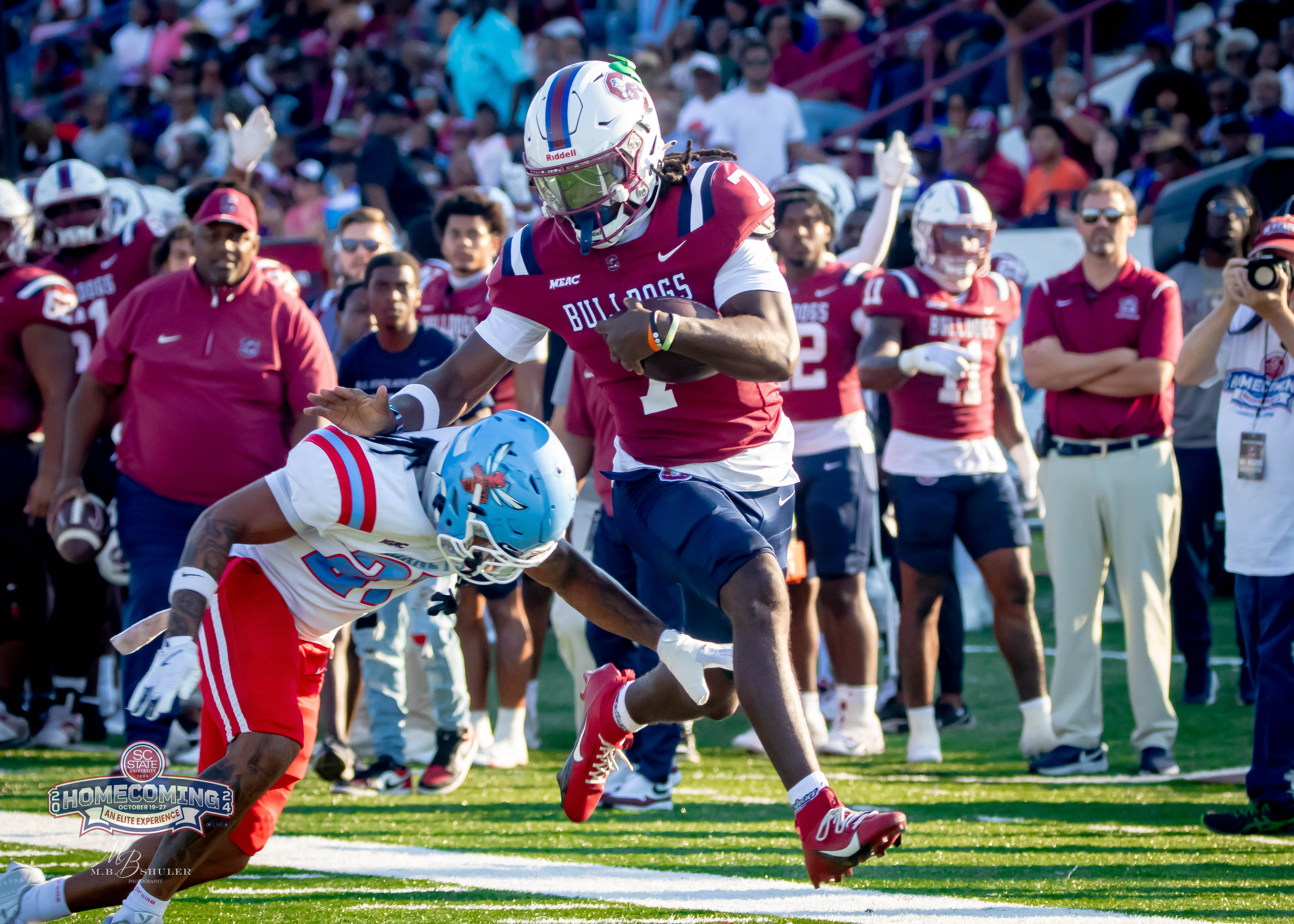
Delaware State at SC State in 2024

Game Seven – Delaware State Hornets (1–6) vs South Carolina State Bulldogs (4–2) – Game summary

| Quarter | 1 | 2 | 3 | 4 | Total |
|---|---|---|---|---|---|
| Hornets | 0 | 0 | 0 | 0 | 0 |
| Bulldogs | 0 | 0 | 0 | 0 | 0 |

at Oliver C. Dawson Stadium, Orangeburg, South Carolina

- Date: Saturday October 26, 2024
- Game time: 3:30 PM
- TV: ESPN+

Game information

First quarter
Second quarter
Third quarter
Fourth quarter

| Statistics | DSU | SCST |
|---|---|---|
| First downs | | |
| Total yards | | |
| Rushing yards | | |
| Passing yards | | |
| Passing: Comp–Att–Int | | |
| Time of possession | | |

| Team | Category | Player | Statistics |
|---|---|---|---|
| Delaware State | Passing | | |
| Delaware State | Rushing | | |
| Delaware State | Receiving | | |
| South Carolina State | Passing | | |
| South Carolina State | Rushing | | |
| South Carolina State | Receiving | | |

=== vs. No. 19 North Carolina Central ===
Game Eight – No. 19 North Carolina Central Eagles (6–2) vs South Carolina State Bulldogs (5–2) – Game summary

| Quarter | 1 | 2 | 3 | 4 | Total |
|---|---|---|---|---|---|
| No. 19 Eagles | 0 | 0 | 0 | 0 | 0 |
| Bulldogs | 0 | 0 | 0 | 0 | 0 |

at Oliver C. Dawson Stadium, Orangeburg, South Carolina

- Date: Thursday October 31, 2024
- Game time: 7:30 PM
- TV announcers (ESPN2): Tiffany Greene (play-by-play) and Jay Walker (analyst)

Game information

First quarter
Second quarter
Third quarter
Fourth quarter

| Statistics | NCCU | SCST |
|---|---|---|
| First downs | | |
| Total yards | | |
| Rushing yards | | |
| Passing yards | | |
| Passing: Comp–Att–Int | | |
| Time of possession | | |

| Team | Category | Player | Statistics |
|---|---|---|---|
| North Carolina Central | Passing | | |
| North Carolina Central | Rushing | | |
| North Carolina Central | Receiving | | |
| South Carolina State | Passing | | |
| South Carolina State | Rushing | | |
| South Carolina State | Receiving | | |

=== at Howard ===
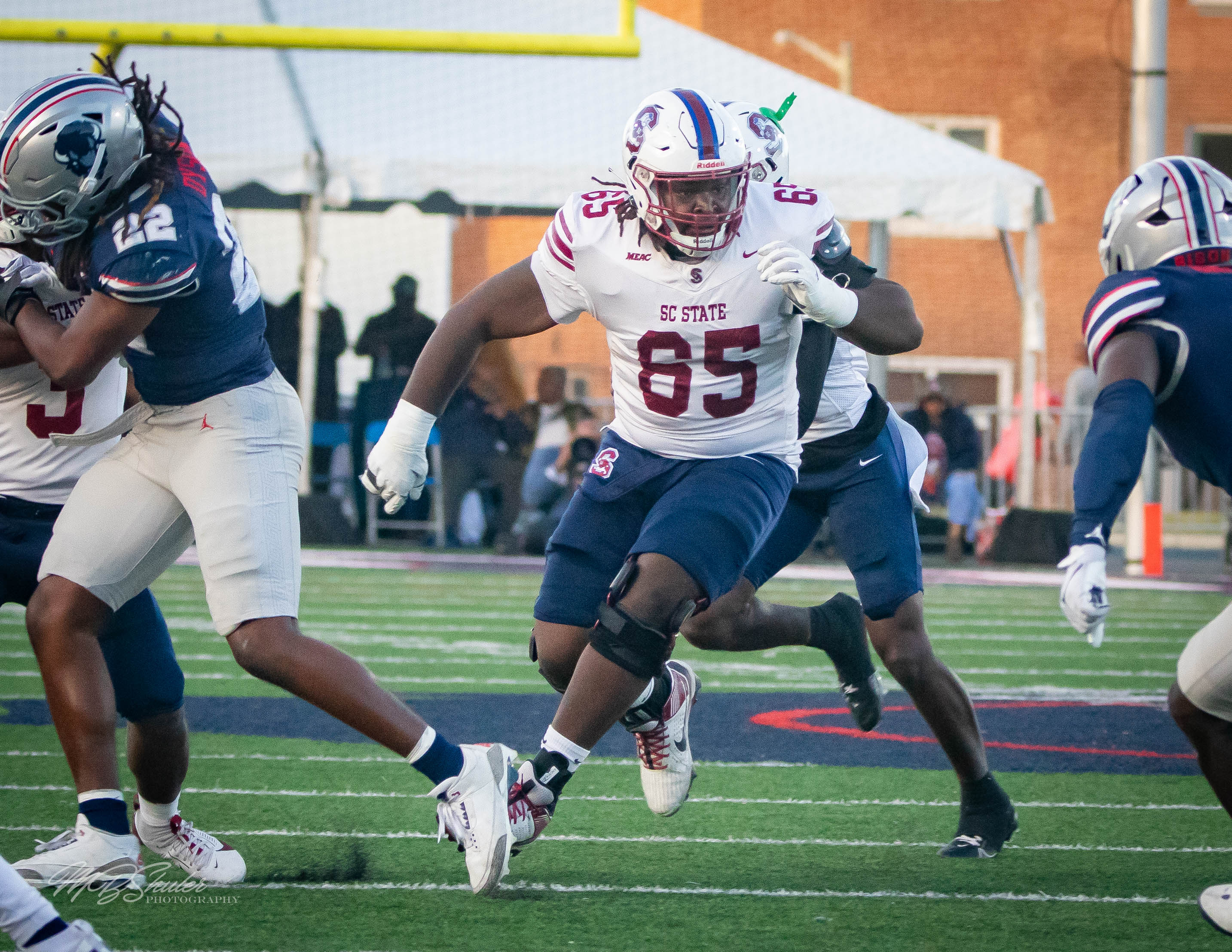
SC State University vs Howard University in Washington DC in 2024

Game Nine – South Carolina State Bulldogs (6–2) vs Howard Bison (4–5) – Game summary

| Quarter | 1 | 2 | 3 | 4 | Total |
|---|---|---|---|---|---|
| Bulldogs | 0 | 0 | 0 | 0 | 0 |
| Bison | 0 | 0 | 0 | 0 | 0 |

at William H. Greene Stadium • Washington, D.C.

- Date: Saturday November 9, 2024
- Game time: 3:30 p.m.
- Game weather: 0 °F (−18 °C)
- TV announcers (ESPN+): Tiffany Greene (play-by-play) and Jay Walker (analyst)

Game information

First quarter
Second quarter
Third quarter
Fourth quarter

| Statistics | SCST | HOW |
|---|---|---|
| First downs | | |
| Total yards | | |
| Rushing yards | | |
| Passing yards | | |
| Passing: Comp–Att–Int | | |
| Time of possession | | |

| Team | Category | Player | Statistics |
|---|---|---|---|
| South Carolina State | Passing | | |
| South Carolina State | Rushing | | |
| South Carolina State | Receiving | | |
| Howard | Passing | | |
| Howard | Rushing | | |
| Howard | Receiving | | |

=== at Morgan State ===
Game Ten – South Carolina State Bulldogs (7–2) vs Morgan State Bears (5–5) – Game summary

| Quarter | 1 | 2 | 3 | 4 | Total |
|---|---|---|---|---|---|
| Bulldogs | 0 | 0 | 0 | 0 | 0 |
| Bears | 0 | 0 | 0 | 0 | 0 |

at Hughes Stadium • Baltimore, MD

- Date: Saturday November 16, 2024
- Game time: 1:00 p.m.
- Game weather: 0 °F (−18 °C)
- TV announcers (ESPN+): Lowell Galindo (play-by-play) and Fozzy Whittaker (analyst)

Game information

First quarter
Second quarter
Third quarter
Fourth quarter

| Statistics | SCST | MORG |
|---|---|---|
| First downs | | |
| Total yards | | |
| Rushing yards | | |
| Passing yards | | |
| Passing: Comp–Att–Int | | |
| Time of possession | | |

| Team | Category | Player | Statistics |
|---|---|---|---|
| South Carolina State | Passing | | |
| South Carolina State | Rushing | | |
| South Carolina State | Receiving | | |
| Morgan State | Passing | | |
| Morgan State | Rushing | | |
| Morgan State | Receiving | | |

=== vs. Norfolk State ===
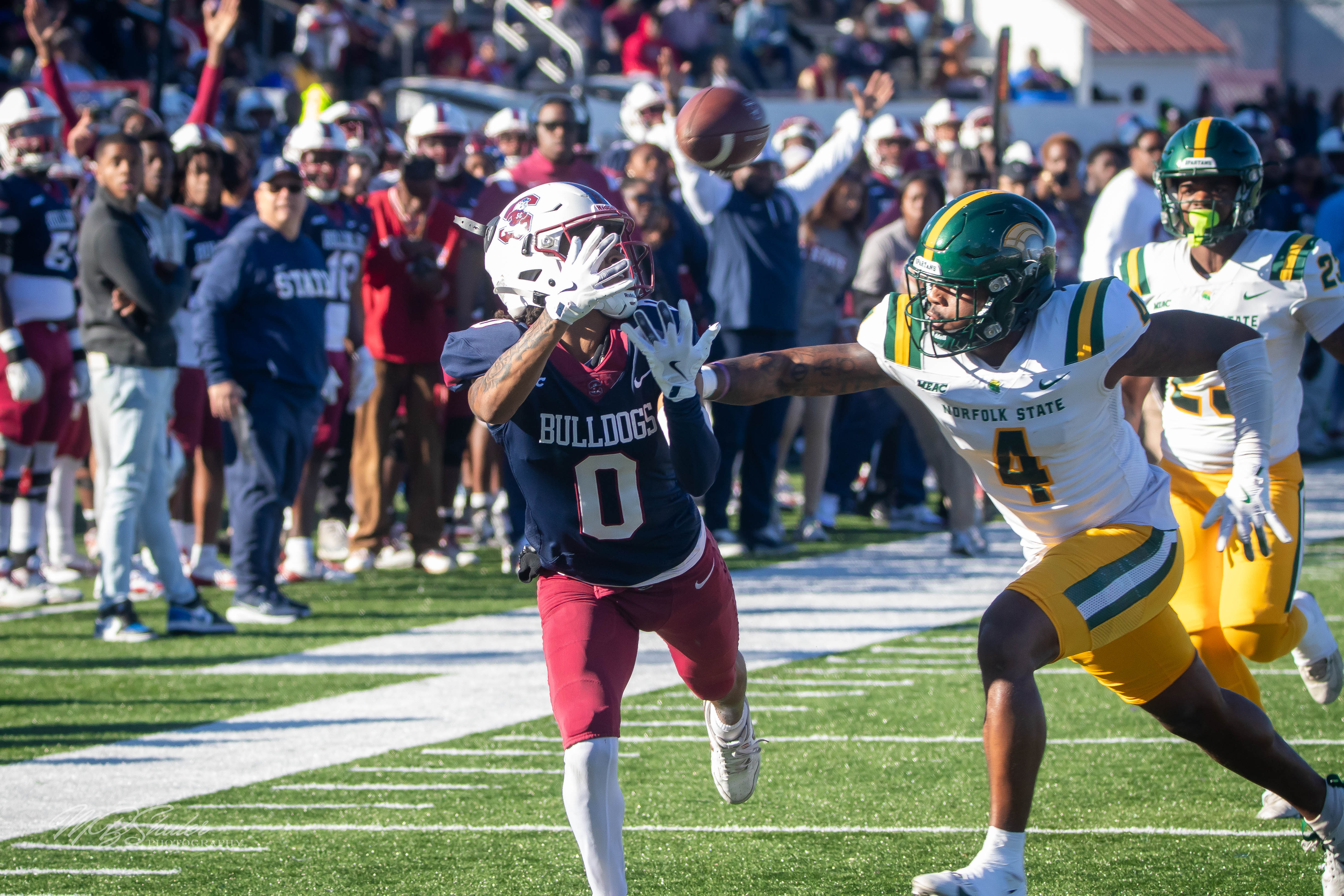
Norfolk State at SC State in 2024

Game Eleven – Norfolk State Spartans (4–7) vs No. 23 South Carolina State Bulldogs (8–2) – Game summary

| Quarter | 1 | 2 | 3 | 4 | Total |
|---|---|---|---|---|---|
| Spartans | 0 | 0 | 0 | 0 | 0 |
| No. 23 Bulldogs | 0 | 0 | 0 | 0 | 0 |

at Oliver C. Dawson Stadium, Orangeburg, South Carolina

- Date: Saturday November 23, 2024
- Game time: 1:30 PM
- TV: ESPN+

Game information

First quarter
Second quarter
Third quarter
Fourth quarter

| Statistics | NORF | SCST |
|---|---|---|
| First downs | | |
| Total yards | | |
| Rushing yards | | |
| Passing yards | | |
| Passing: Comp–Att–Int | | |
| Time of possession | | |

| Team | Category | Player | Statistics |
|---|---|---|---|
| Norfolk State | Passing | | |
| Norfolk State | Rushing | | |
| Norfolk State | Receiving | | |
| South Carolina State | Passing | | |
| South Carolina State | Rushing | | |
| South Carolina State | Receiving | | |

=== vs. No. 18 Jackson State (Celebration Bowl) ===
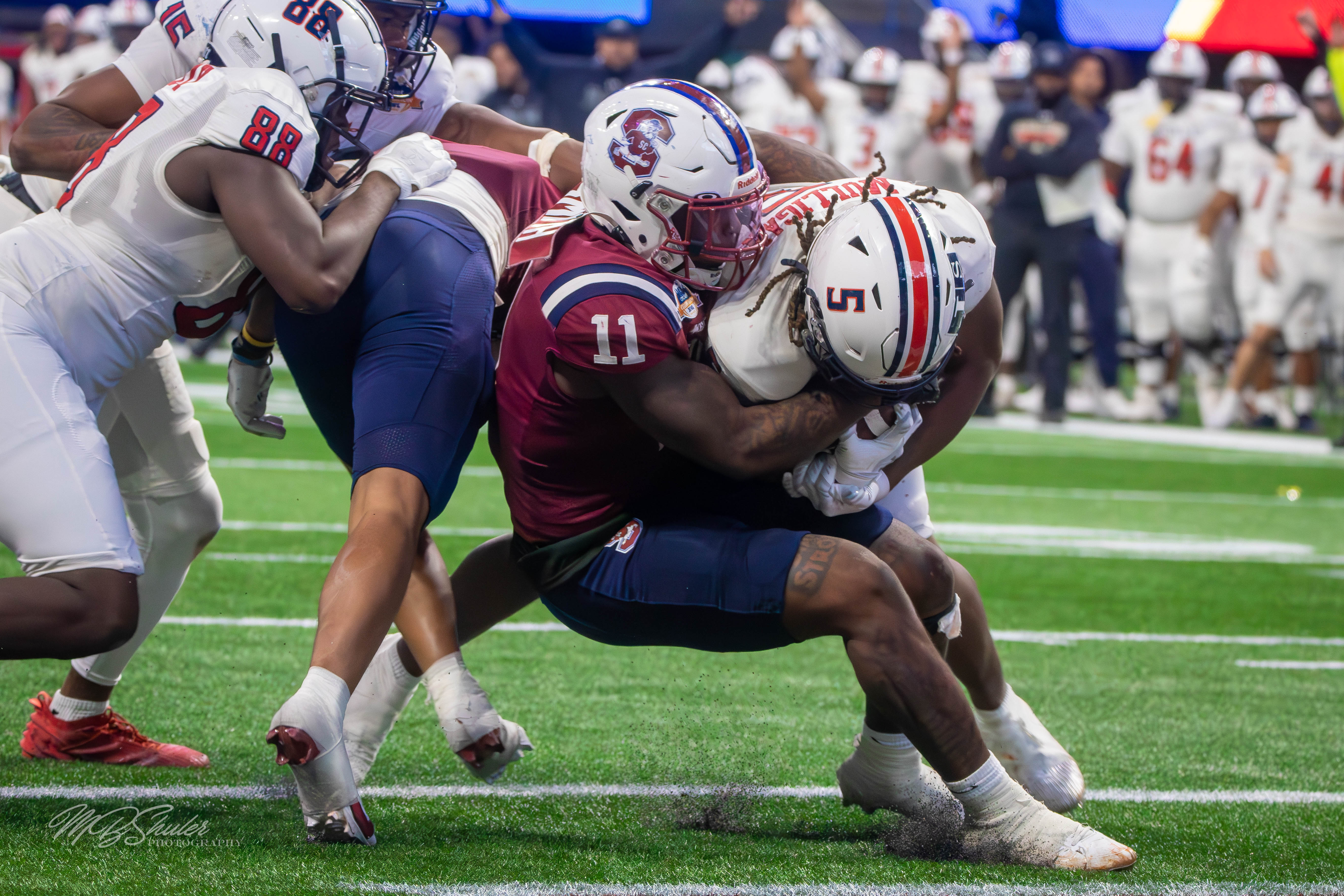
SC State vs Jackson State in the 2024 Celebration Bowl

2024 Celebration Bowl
No. 18 Jackson State Tigers (11–2) vs No. 20 South Carolina State Bulldogs (9–2) – Game summary

| Quarter | 1 | 2 | 3 | 4 | Total |
|---|---|---|---|---|---|
| No. 18 Tigers | 0 | 14 | 0 | 14 | 28 |
| No. 20 Bulldogs | 0 | 0 | 0 | 7 | 7 |

at Mercedes-Benz Stadium, Atlanta, Georgia

- Date: Saturday December 14, 2024
- Game time: 12:00 PM EST
- Game weather: Indoors
- Game attendance: 36,823
- TV: ABC

Game information

First quarter
Second quarter
Third quarter
Fourth quarter

| Statistics | JKST | SCST |
|---|---|---|
| First downs | | |
| Total yards | | |
| Rushing yards | | |
| Passing yards | | |
| Passing: Comp–Att–Int | | |
| Time of possession | | |

| Team | Category | Player | Statistics |
|---|---|---|---|
| Jackson State | Passing | | |
| Jackson State | Rushing | | |
| Jackson State | Receiving | | |
| South Carolina State | Passing | | |
| South Carolina State | Rushing | | |
| South Carolina State | Receiving | | |
