= 2024 Celebration Bowl =

Postseason college football bowl game

2024 Cricket Celebration Bowl
- 9th Celebration Bowl
| Jackson State Tigers | South Carolina State Bulldogs |
| (11–2) | (9–2) |
| SWAC | MEAC |
| 28 | 7 |
| Head coach: T. C. Taylor | Head coach: Chennis Berry |
| Coaches / STATS; 15 / 18 | Coaches / STATS; 18 / 20 |
| | 1 | 2 | 3 | 4 | Total |
|---|---|---|---|---|---|
| Jackson State | 0 | 14 | 0 | 14 | 28 |
| South Carolina State | 0 | 0 | 0 | 7 | 7 |
- Date: December 14, 2024
- Season: 2024
- Stadium: Mercedes-Benz Stadium
- Location: Atlanta, Georgia
- MVP: Off: Jacobian Morgan (QB, Jackson State); Def: Jeremiah Williams (DL, Jackson State)
- Favorite: Jackson State by 1.5
- Referee: Rory Bernard (CUSA)
- Attendance: 36,823

United States TV coverage
- Network: ABC; ESPN Radio
- Announcers: ABC: Tiffany Greene (play-by-play), Jay Walker (analyst), and Quint Kessenich (sideline); ESPN Radio: Jason Ross Jr. (play-by-play), Max Starks (analyst), and Jordan Reid (sideline)

International TV coverage
- Network: Brazil: ESPN Brazil; Canada: TSN1/4
- Announcers: ESPN Brazil: Conrado Giulietti (play-by-play) and Weinny Eirado (analyst)

The 2024 Celebration Bowl was a college football bowl game played on December 14, 2024, at Mercedes-Benz Stadium in Atlanta, Georgia. The ninth annual Celebration Bowl featured South Carolina State, champions of the Mid-Eastern Athletic Conference (MEAC), and Jackson State, champions of the Southwestern Athletic Conference (SWAC). The game began at approximately 12:00 p.m. EST and aired on ABC. Sponsored by Cricket Wireless, the game was officially known as the Cricket Celebration Bowl.

The SWAC and MEAC are the two NCAA Division I conferences of historically black colleges and universities (HBCUs). The Celebration Bowl thus serves as a de facto black college football national championship.

The Celebration Bowl was the only one of the 2024–25 bowl games played by teams from the Football Championship Subdivision (FCS). The NCAA had a 24-team bracket tournament to determine a champion for the 2024 FCS football season.

== Teams ==
=== South Carolina State ===
South Carolina State secured their Celebration Bowl berth with a win over Morgan State on November 16, clinching the MEAC title for the Bulldogs. South Carolina State had suffered two losses in their first three regular-season games, falling to Florida A&M and Georgia Southern. The Bulldogs then won their next seven games, improving to 8–2 overall (4–0 in conference) at the time they secured their bowl berth. South Carolina State subsequently defeated Norfolk in their final regular-season game, and entered the Celebration Bowl with an overall record of 9–2 (5–0 in conference).

=== Jackson State Tigers ===
Jackson State defeated Southern in the SWAC Football Championship Game to secure a berth in the Celebration Bowl. The Tigers entered the bowl with an 11–2 record (9–0 in conference), having lost only to Louisiana–Monroe (an FBS team) and Grambling State.

== Game summary ==
After a scoreless first quarter, Jackson State scored two touchdowns in the second quarter and took a 14–0 lead into halftime. Following a scoreless third quarter, Jackson State extended its lead to 21–0, after which the teams traded touchdowns, for a 28–7 final score. This was Jackson State's first Celebration Bowl win in three appearances.

2024 Cricket Celebration Bowl

| Quarter | 1 | 2 | 3 | 4 | Total |
|---|---|---|---|---|---|
| Jackson State | 0 | 14 | 0 | 14 | 28 |
| South Carolina State | 0 | 0 | 0 | 7 | 7 |

at Mercedes-Benz Stadium • Atlanta, Georgia

- Date: Saturday, December 14, 2024
- Game time: 12:04 p.m. EST
- Game weather: N/A (indoor stadium)
- Game attendance: 36823
- Referee: Rory Bernard
- TV: ABC
- Box score

Game information

First Quarter

No scoring

Second Quarter

- (11:26) JSU – Joanes Fortilien 4-yard pass from Jacobian Morgan (Gerardo Baeza kick). Drive: 19 plays, 78 yards, 9:39. JSU 7–0
- (5:39) JSU – Irv Mulligan 1-yard run (Gerardo Baeza kick). Drive: 2 plays, 68 yards, 0:27. JSU 14–0

Third Quarter

No scoring

Fourth Quarter

- (14:48) JSU – Irv Mulligan 2-yard run (Gerardo Baeza kick). Drive: 11 plays, 64 yards, 5:59. JSU 21–0
- (11:13) SCSU – Eric Phoenix 3-yard run (Kyle Gallegos kick). Drive: 8 plays, 80 yards, 3:37. JSU 21–7
- (4:50) JSU – Joanes Fortilien 14-yard pass from Jacobian Morgan (Gerardo Baeza kick). Drive: 1 play, 14 yards, 0:09. JSU 28–7
