= 2025 Florida Gators football team =

American college football season

2025 Florida Gators football
- Conference: Southeastern Conference
- Record: 4–8 (2–6 SEC)
- Head coach: Billy Napier (4th season; first 7 games); Billy Gonzales (interim; remainder of season)
- Offensive coordinator: Russ Callaway (2nd season)
- Offensive scheme: Spread option
- Defensive coordinator: Ron Roberts (2nd season)
- Co-defensive coordinators: Vinnie Sunseri (1st season); Robert Bala (1st season)
- Base defense: 3–3–5
- Home stadium: Ben Hill Griffin Stadium

2025 Southeastern Conference football standings
	Conf.			Overall
Team	W		L	W		L
No. 9 Alabama y^	7	–	1	11	–	4
No. 6 Georgia y$^	7	–	1	12	–	2
No. 3 Ole Miss ^	7	–	1	13	–	2
No. 8 Texas A&M ^	7	–	1	11	–	2
No. 13 Oklahoma ^	6	–	2	10	–	3
No. 12 Texas	6	–	2	10	–	3
No. 15 Vanderbilt	6	–	2	10	–	3
Missouri	4	–	4	8	–	5
Tennessee	4	–	4	8	–	5
LSU	3	–	5	7	–	6
Kentucky	2	–	6	5	–	7
Florida	2	–	6	4	–	8
Auburn	1	–	7	5	–	7
Mississippi State	1	–	7	5	–	8
South Carolina	1	–	7	4	–	8
Arkansas	0	–	8	2	–	10
Championship: Georgia 28, Alabama 7
^ – College Football Playoff participant; $ – Conference champion; y – Championship game participant; Rankings from AP Poll

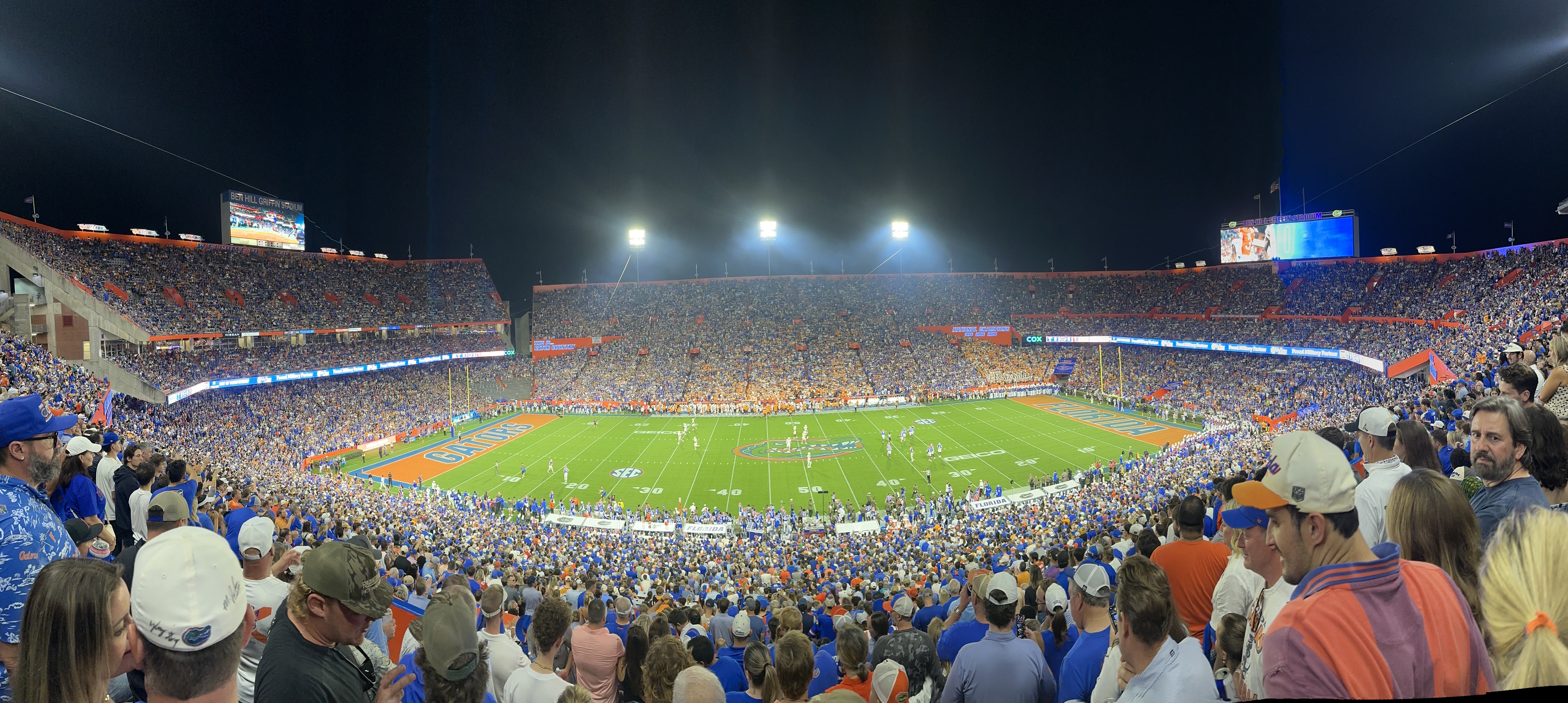
Ben Hill Griffin Stadium prior to a Florida Gators football game against the Tennessee Volunteers in November 2025

The 2025 Florida Gators football team represented the University of Florida as a member of the Southeastern Conference (SEC) during the 2025 NCAA Division I FBS football season. For the first 7 games, they were led by fourth-year head coach Billy Napier, who was fired on October 19. The Gators played home games at Ben Hill Griffin Stadium in Gainesville, Florida.

The Florida Gators drew an average home attendance of 90,125, the 10th-highest of all American football teams in the world.

After a lot of offseason hype stemming from the previous season’s four-game winning streak to conclude an 8–5 season that showed progress, the 2025 season quickly went south for Billy Napier and the Gators. In the second game of the year, Florida blew a second-half lead and lost 18–16 to USF— which entered the game as an 18.5 point underdog. The Gators showed little, if any improvement from then on and Napier was fired after an error-prone 23–21 win over Mississippi State. Billy Gonzales took over as the interim coach after the ensuing bye week, and though things looked promising in a 24–20 loss to a top-five Georgia team, things spiraled out of control from there, with Florida losing its next three games by an average of 17 points.

However, the season did end on a high note, with Jadan Baugh racking up 266 yards on the ground against FSU (the second most in a game in Florida history) in a 40–21 rout of archrival FSU. Having salvaged the finale, Florida finished the season 4–8. In doing so, Florida avoided its worst record since 1979.

== Schedule ==
Date	Time	Opponent	Rank	Site	TV	Result	Attendance
August 30	7:00 p.m.	LIU*	No. 15	Ben Hill Griffin Stadium; Gainesville, FL	SECN+/ESPN+	W 55–0	89,451
September 6	4:15 p.m.	South Florida*	No. 13	Ben Hill Griffin Stadium; Gainesville, FL	SECN	L 16–18	89,909
September 13	7:30 p.m.	at No. 3 LSU		Tiger Stadium; Baton Rouge, LA (rivalry)	ABC	L 10–20	102,158
September 20	7:30 p.m.	at No. 4 Miami (FL)*		Hard Rock Stadium; Miami Gardens, FL (rivalry, Florida Cup, College GameDay)	ABC	L 7–26	66,713
October 4	3:30 p.m.	No. 9 Texas		Ben Hill Griffin Stadium; Gainesville, FL (SEC Nation)	ESPN	W 29–21	90,714
October 11	7:00 p.m.	at No. 5 Texas A&M		Kyle Field; College Station, TX	ESPN	L 17–34	105,086
October 18	4:15 p.m.	Mississippi State^{†}		Ben Hill Griffin Stadium; Gainesville, FL	SECN	W 23–21	90,203
November 1	3:30 p.m.	vs. No. 5 Georgia		EverBank Stadium; Jacksonville, FL (rivalry)	ABC	L 20–24	76,131
November 8	7:30 p.m.	at Kentucky		Kroger Field; Lexington, KY (rivalry)	SECN	L 7–38	56,388
November 15	7:00 p.m.	at No. 7 Ole Miss		Vaught–Hemingway Stadium; Oxford, MS	ESPN	L 24–34	68,138
November 22	7:30 p.m.	No. 20 Tennessee		Ben Hill Griffin Stadium; Gainesville, FL (rivalry)	ABC	L 11–31	90,465
November 29	4:30 p.m.	Florida State*		Ben Hill Griffin Stadium; Gainesville, FL (Sunshine Showdown, Florida Cup)	ESPN2	W 40–21	90,007
*Non-conference game; ^{†}Homecoming; Rankings from AP Poll (and CFP Rankings, after November 4) – Released prior to game; All times are in Eastern time; Source:

== Rankings ==
Ranking movements Legend: ██ Increase in ranking ██ Decrease in ranking — = Not ranked RV = Received votes
	Week																
Poll	Pre	1	2	3	4	5	6	7	8	9	10	11	12	13	14	15	Final
AP	15	13	RV	—	—	—	—	—	—	—	—	—	—	—	—	—	—
Coaches	17	15	RV	—	—	—	—	—	—	—	—	—	—	—	—	—	—
CFP	Not released										—	—	—	—	—	—	Not released

== Game summaries ==
=== LIU (FCS) ===
LIU Sharks (FCS) (0–0) at No. 15 Florida Gators (0–0) – Game summary

Quarter	1	2	3	4	Total
Sharks (FCS)	0	0	0	0	0
No. 15 Gators	14	24	10	7	55

at Ben Hill Griffin Stadium • Gainesville, Florida

- Date: August 30
- Game time: 7:02 p.m. EDT
- Game weather: Temperature: 85 °F (29 °C) • Wind: NW at 5 miles per hour (8.0 km/h) • Weather: cloudy
- Game attendance: 89,451
- Referee: Trennis Livingston
- TV announcers (SECN+/ESPN+): Jay Alter (play-by-play), Rocky Boiman (analyst), and Stephanie Otey (sideline reporter)
- Boxscore

Game information

First quarter

- FLA – Bryce Thornton 37-yard fumble return (Trey Smack kick), 13:41. Gators 7–0.
- FLA – Jadan Baugh 4-yard run (Trey Smack kick), 9:29. Gators 14–0. Drive: 6 plays, 66 yards, 2:21.

Second quarter

- FLA – Trey Smack 56-yard field goal, 14:47. Gators 17–0. Drive: 4 plays, 0 yards, 1:03.
- FLA – Eugene Wilson III 4-yard pass from DJ Lagway (Trey Smack kick), 7:04. Gators 24–0. Drive: 3 plays, 10 yards, 1:24.
- FLA – Hayden Hansen 4-yard pass from DJ Lagway (Trey Smack kick), 3:26. Gators 31–0. Drive: 6 plays, 88 yards, 1:59.
- FLA – J. Michael Sturdivant 8-yard pass from DJ Lagway (Trey Smack kick), 0:10. Gators 38–0. Drive: 6 plays, 75 yards, 1:40.

Third quarter

- FLA – Trey Smack 41-yard field goal, 10:53. Gators 41–0. Drive: 8 plays, 43 yards, 3:57.
- FLA – Tony Livingston 4-yard pass from Tramell Jones Jr. (Trey Smack kick), 2:03. Gators 48–0. Drive: 6 plays, 64 yards, 2:58.

Fourth quarter

- FLA – Taylor Spierto 11-yard pass from Tramell Jones Jr. (Trey Smack kick), 0:25. Gators 55–0. Drive: 13 plays, 78 yards, 6:06.

Statistics	LIU	FLA
First downs	2	27
Plays–yards	43–86	74–451
Rushes–yards	32–37	38–200
Passing yards	49	251
Passing: comp–att–int	4–11–0	27–36–0
Turnovers	2	0
Time of possession	25:33	34:27

Team	Category	Player	Statistics
LIU	Passing	Luca Stanzani	1/3, 28 yards
LIU	Rushing	Kam Ingram	4 carries, 14 yards
LIU	Receiving	Deion Richardson	2 receptions, 37 yards
Florida	Passing	Tramell Jones Jr.	12/18, 131 yards, 2 TD
Florida	Rushing	Jadan Baugh	9 carries, 104 yards, TD
Florida	Receiving	Vernell Brown III	3 receptions, 79 yards

=== South Florida ===
South Florida Bulls (1–0) at No. 13 Florida Gators (1–0) – Game summary

Quarter	1	2	3	4	Total
Bulls	0	6	9	3	18
No. 13 Gators	3	6	0	7	16

at Ben Hill Griffin Stadium • Gainesville, Florida

- Date: September 6
- Game time: 4:20 p.m. EDT
- Game weather: Temperature: 90 °F (32 °C) • Wind: NE at 4 miles per hour (6.4 km/h) • Weather: cloudy
- Game attendance: 89,909
- Referee: Steve Marlowe
- TV announcers (SECN): Dave Neal (play-by-play), Fozzy Whittaker (analyst), and Morgan Uber (sideline reporter)
- Boxscore

Game information

First quarter

- FLA – Trey Smack 28-yard field goal, 5:39. Gators 3–0. Drive: 14 plays, 81 yards, 6:12.

Second quarter

- USF – Nico Gramatica 38-yard field goal, 14:52. Tied 3–3. Drive: 15 plays, 55 yards, 5:47.
- FLA – Trey Smack 36-yard field goal, 7:13. Gators 6–3. Drive: 13 plays, 57 yards, 7:39.
- FLA – Trey Smack 41-yard field goal, 1:50. Gators 9–3. Drive: 8 plays, 64 yards, 3:28.
- USF – Nico Gramatica 25-yard field goal, 0:00. Gators 9–6. Drive: 8 plays, 68 yards, 1:50.

Third quarter

- USF – Keshaun Singleton 66-yard pass from Byrum Brown (Nico Gramatica kick), 2:03. Bulls 13–9. Drive: 4 plays, 86 yards, 1:10.
- USF – Team safety, 0:13. Bulls 15–9.

Fourth quarter

- FLA – Eugene Wilson III 4-yard pass from DJ Lagway (Trey Smack kick), 12:29. Gators 16–15. Drive: 5 plays, 20 yards, 1:53.
- USF – Nico Gramatica 20-yard field goal, 0:00. Bulls 18–16. Drive: 8 plays, 87 yards, 2:25.

Statistics	USF	FLA
First downs	20	19
Plays–yards	65–391	64–355
Rushes–yards	29–128	31–133
Passing yards	263	222
Passing: comp–att–int	23–36–0	23–33–1
Turnovers	0	1
Time of possession	24:56	32:23

Team	Category	Player	Statistics
South Florida	Passing	Byrum Brown	23/36, 263 yards, TD
South Florida	Rushing	Byrum Brown	17 carries, 66 yards
South Florida	Receiving	Keshaun Singleton	2 receptions, 75 yards, TD
Florida	Passing	DJ Lagway	23/33, 222 yards, TD, INT
Florida	Rushing	Jadan Baugh	18 carries, 93 yards
Florida	Receiving	Eugene Wilson III	7 receptions, 60 yards, TD

=== at No. 3 LSU ===
Florida Gators (1–1) at No. 3 LSU Tigers (2–0) – Game summary

Quarter	1	2	3	4	Total
Gators	3	7	0	0	10
No. 3 Tigers	0	13	7	0	20

at Tiger Stadium • Baton Rouge, Louisiana

- Date: September 13
- Game time: 6:30 p.m. CDT
- Game weather: Sunny • Temperature: 91 °F (33 °C) • Wind: NE 5 mph
- Game attendance: 102,158
- Referee: Jeff Heaser
- TV announcers (ABC): Sean McDonough (play-by-play), Greg McElroy (analyst), and Molly McGrath (sideline reporter)

Game information

First quarter

- (11:34) FLA – Trey Smack 45-yard field goal (Drive: 7 plays, 34 yards, 2:27; Florida 3–0)

Second quarter

- (14:56) LSU – Damian Ramos 47-yard field goal (Drive: 6 plays, 14 yards, 2:49; Tied 3–3)
- (7:33) LSU – Zavion Thomas 23-yard pass from Garrett Nussmeier, Damian Ramos kick (Drive: 10 plays, 76 yards, 4:03; LSU 10–3)
- (3:25) FLA – Aidan Mizell 10-yard pass from DJ Lagway, Trey Smack kick (Drive: 10 plays, 75 yards, 4:08; Tied 10–10)
- (0:00) LSU – Damian Ramos 45-yard field goal (Drive: 3 plays, 12 yards, 0:23; LSU 13–10)

Third quarter

- (8:08) LSU – Dashawn Spears 58-yard interception return, Damian Ramos kick (LSU 20–10)

Fourth quarter

No scoring plays

Statistics	FLA	LSU
First downs	23	10
Plays–yards	76–366	52–316
Rushes–yards	27–79	25–96
Passing yards	287	220
Passing: comp–att–int	33–49–5	15–27–1
Turnovers	5	1
Time of possession	37:46	22:14

Team	Category	Player	Statistics
Florida	Passing	DJ Lagway	33/49, 287 yards, TD, 5 INT
Florida	Rushing	Jadan Baugh	10 carries, 46 yards
Florida	Receiving	Vernell Brown III	8 receptions, 62 yards
LSU	Passing	Garrett Nussmeier	15/27, 220 yards, TD, INT
LSU	Rushing	Caden Durham	15 carries, 93 yards
LSU	Receiving	Aaron Anderson	4 receptions, 75 yards

=== at No. 4 Miami (FL) (rivalry) ===
Florida Gators (1–2) at No. 4 Miami Hurricanes (3–0) – Game summary

Quarter	1	2	3	4	Total
Gators	0	0	7	0	7
No. 4 Hurricanes	7	6	0	13	26

at Hard Rock Stadium • Miami Gardens, Florida

- Date: September 20
- Game time: 7:30 p.m. EDT
- Game weather: Rain • Temperature: 83 °F (28 °C) • Wind: NE 6 mph
- Game attendance: 66,713
- Referee: David Smith
- TV announcers (ABC): Chris Fowler (play-by-play), Kirk Herbstreit (analyst), and Holly Rowe (sideline reporter)

Game information

First quarter

- (9:25) MIA – CharMar Brown 2-yard run, Carter Davis kick (Drive: 7 plays, 56 yards, 3:31; Miami 7–0)

Second quarter

- (14:04) MIA – Carter Davis 53-yard field goal (Drive: 16 plays, 37 yards, 8:19; Miami 10–0)
- (1:29) MIA – Carter Davis 28-yard field goal (Drive: 10 plays, 52 yards, 3:22; Miami 13–0)

Third quarter

- (3:24) FLA – Jadan Baugh 7-yard run, Trey Smack kick (Drive: 11 plays, 80 yards, 6:12; Miami 13–7)

Fourth quarter

- (4:08) MIA – CharMar Brown 1-yard run, two-point conversion failed (Drive: 13 plays, 80 yards, 7:12; Miami 19–7)
- (1:56) MIA – Mark Fletcher Jr. 1-yard run, Carter Davis kick (Drive: 4 plays, 22 yards, 1:02; Miami 26–7)

Statistics	FLA	MIA
First downs	7	21
Plays–yards	52–141	76–344
Rushes–yards	29–80	46–184
Passing yards	61	160
Passing: comp–att–int	12–23–0	17–30–1
Turnovers	0	1
Time of possession	23:30	36:30

Team	Category	Player	Statistics
Florida	Passing	DJ Lagway	12/23, 61 yards
Florida	Rushing	Jadan Baugh	12 carries, 46 yards, TD
Florida	Receiving	Vernell Brown III	2 receptions, 22 yards
Miami (FL)	Passing	Carson Beck	17/30, 160 yards, INT
Miami (FL)	Rushing	Mark Fletcher Jr.	24 carries, 124 yards, TD
Miami (FL)	Receiving	CharMar Brown	4 receptions, 53 yards

=== No. 9 Texas ===
No. 9 Texas Longhorns (3–1) at Florida Gators (1–3) – Game summary

Quarter	1	2	3	4	Total
No. 9 Longhorns	0	7	7	7	21
Gators	10	9	10	0	29

at Ben Hill Griffin Stadium • Gainesville, Florida

- Date: October 4
- Game time: 3:30 p.m. EDT
- Game weather: Sunny • Temperature: 82 °F (28 °C) • Wind: NE 7 mph
- Game attendance: 90,714
- Referee: James Carter
- TV announcers (ESPN): Bob Wischusen (play-by-play), Louis Riddick (analyst), and Kris Budden (sideline reporter)

Game information

First quarter

- (7:58) FLA – Jadan Baugh 5-yard run (Trey Smack kick), (Drive: 13 plays, 84 yards, 6:52; Florida 7–0)
- (1:00) FLA – Trey Smack 34-yard field goal (Drive: 10 plays, 64 yards, 4:12; Florida 10–0)

Second quarter

- (9:55) TEX – Quintrevion Wisner 6-yard pass from Arch Manning (Mason Shipley kick), (Drive: 4 plays, 45 yards, 2:11; Florida 10–7)
- (4:55) FLA – Dallas Wilson 13-yard pass from DJ Lagway (Trey Smack kick), (Drive: 10 plays, 77 yards, 4:57; Florida 17–7)
- (3:52) FLA – Team safety (Drive: 3 plays, 1 yard, 1:03; Florida 19–7)

Third quarter

- (5:37) FLA – Trey Smack 38-yard field goal (Drive: 5 plays, 60 yards, 3:13; Florida 22–7)
- (2:43) TEX – Ryan Wingo 38-yard pass from Arch Manning (Mason Shipley kick), (Drive: 6 plays, 75 yards, 2:54; Florida 22–14)
- (0:38) FLA – Dallas Wilson 55-yard pass from DJ Lagway (Trey Smack kick), (Drive: 5 plays, 75 yards, 2:05; Florida 29–14)

Fourth quarter

- (3:20) FLA – Quintrevion Wisner 1-yard run (Mason Shipley kick), (Drive: 5 plays, 69 yards, 1:30; Florida 29–21)

Statistics	TEX	FLA
First downs	16	22
Plays–yards	58–341	65–457
Rushes–yards	26–58	37–159
Passing yards	289	298
Passing: comp–att–int	17–32–2	21–28–2
Turnovers	2	2
Time of possession	25:53	34:07

Team	Category	Player	Statistics
Texas	Passing	Arch Manning	16–29, 263 yards, 2 TD, 2 INT
Texas	Rushing	Arch Manning	15 carries, 37 yards
Texas	Receiving	DeAndre Moore Jr.	3 receptions, 75 yards
Florida	Passing	DJ Lagway	21–28, 298 yards, 2 TD, INT
Florida	Rushing	Jadan Baugh	27 carries, 107 yards, TD
Florida	Receiving	Dallas Wilson	6 receptions, 111 yards, 2 TD

=== at No. 5 Texas A&M ===
Florida Gators (2–3) at No. 5 Texas A&M Aggies (5–0) – Game summary

Quarter	1	2	3	4	Total
Gators	14	0	3	0	17
No. 5 Aggies	14	7	3	10	34

at Kyle Field • College Station, Texas

- Date: October 11
- Game time: 7:00 p.m. EDT
- Game weather:
- Game attendance: 105,086
- Referee: Lee Hedrick
- TV announcers (ESPN): Mark Jones (play-by-play), Roddy Jones (analyst), and Quint Kessenich (sideline reporter)

Game information

First quarter

- FLA – Amir Jackson 1-yard pass from DJ Lagway (Trey Smack kick), 11:08. Gators 7–0. Drive: 8 plays, 75 yards, 3:52.
- TA&M – Marcel Reed 8-yard run (Randy Bond kick), 10:14. Tied 7–7. Drive: 2 plays, 75 yards, 0:54.
- TA&M – Jamarion Morrow 22-yard pass from Marcel Reed (Randy Bond kick), 6:19. Aggies 14–7. Drive: 6 plays, 81 yards, 2:31.
- FLA – Dallas Wilson 6-yard pass from DJ Lagway (Trey Smack kick), 3:38. Tied 14–14. Drive: 6 plays, 75 yards, 2:41.

Second quarter

- TA&M – Le'Veon Moss 22-yard run (Randy Bond kick), 13:04. Aggies 21–14. Drive: 11 plays, 75 yards, 5:34.

Third quarter

- TA&M – Randy Bond 26-yard field goal, 10:42. Aggies 24–14. Drive: 5 plays, 21 yards, 2:07.
- FLA – Trey Smack 45-yard field goal, 7:08. Aggies 24–17. Drive: 9 plays, 47 yards, 3:29.

Fourth quarter

- TA&M – Rueben Owens II 2-yard run (Randy Bond kick), 4:39. Aggies 31–17. Drive: 13 plays, 50 yards, 8:09.
- TA&M – Randy Bond 22-yard field goal, 1:11. Aggies 34–17. Drive: 8 plays, 18 yards, 3:17.

Statistics	FLA	TA&M
First downs	15	19
Plays–yards	61–319	68–417
Rushes–yards	24–74	42–183
Passing yards	245	234
Passing: comp–att–int	21–37–0	16–26–1
Turnovers	2	1
Time of possession	26:18	33:42

Team	Category	Player	Statistics
Florida	Passing	DJ Lagway	21/37, 245 yards, 2 TD
Florida	Rushing	Jadan Baugh	18 carries, 65 yards
Florida	Receiving	Vernell Brown III	6 receptions, 77 yards
Texas A&M	Passing	Marcel Reed	16/26, 234 yards, TD, INT
Texas A&M	Rushing	Rueben Owens II	17 carries, 51 yards, TD
Texas A&M	Receiving	Mario Craver	2 receptions, 77 yards

=== Mississippi State ===
Mississippi State Bulldogs (4–2) at Florida Gators (2–4) – Game summary

Quarter	1	2	3	4	Total
Bulldogs	7	0	0	14	21
Gators	3	10	0	10	23

at Ben Hill Griffin Stadium • Gainesville, Florida

- Date: October 18
- Game time: 4:15 p.m.
- Game weather:
- Game attendance: 90,203
- Referee: Matt Loeffler
- TV announcers (SECN): Dave Neal (play-by-play), Fozzy Whitaker (analyst), and Morgan Uber (sideline reporter)

Game information

First quarter

- MSST – Kamario Taylor 2-yard run (Kyle Ferrie kick), 12:18. Bulldogs 7–0. Drive: 8 plays, 75 yards, 2:42.
- FLA – Trey Smack 24-yard field goal, 8:55. Bulldogs 7–3. Drive: 11 plays, 58 yards, 3:23.

Second quarter

- FLA – Jadan Baugh 19-yard run (Trey Smack kick), 14:15. Gators 10–7. Drive: 6 plays, 69 yards, 2:21.
- FLA – Trey Smack 54-yard field goal, 3:08. Gators 13–7. Drive: 11 plays, 49 yards, 5:31.

Third quarter

- No scoring plays.

Fourth quarter

- FLA – KD Daniels 1-yard run (Trey Smack kick), 13:41. Gators 20–7. Drive: 11 plays, 93 yards, 5:19.
- MSST – Davon Booth 2-yard run (Kyle Ferrie kick), 11:57. Gators 20–14. Drive: 5 plays, 65 yards, 1:44.
- FLA – Trey Smack 53-yard field goal, 6:49. Gators 23–14. Drive: 8 plays, 40 yards, 5:08.
- MSST – Davon Booth 2-yard run (Kyle Ferrie kick), 2:00. Gators 23–21. Drive: 13 plays, 75 yards, 4:49.

Statistics	MSST	FLA
First downs	22	25
Plays–yards	80–468	68–452
Rushes–yards	44–144	33–172
Passing yards	324	280
Passing: comp–att–int	24–36–1	20–34–2
Turnovers	2	2
Time of possession	30:05	29:55

Team	Category	Player	Statistics
Mississippi State	Passing	Blake Shapen	24/36, 324 yards, INT
Mississippi State	Rushing	Davon Booth	22 carries, 105 yards, 2 TD
Mississippi State	Receiving	Brenen Thompson	7 receptions, 155 yards
Florida	Passing	DJ Lagway	20/34, 280 yards, 2 INT
Florida	Rushing	Jadan Baugh	23 carries, 150 yards, TD
Florida	Receiving	Vernell Brown III	5 receptions, 95 yards

=== vs. No. 5 Georgia (rivalry) ===
No. 5 Georgia Bulldogs (6–1) vs. Florida Gators (3–4) – Game summary

Quarter	1	2	3	4	Total
No. 5 Bulldogs	7	3	7	7	24
Gators	10	0	7	3	20

at EverBank Stadium • Jacksonville, Florida

- Date: November 1
- Game time: 3:30 p.m. EDT
- Game weather: Sunny • Temperature: 69 °F (21 °C) • Wind: ENE 4 mph
- Game attendance: 76,131
- Referee: James Carter
- TV announcers (ABC): Joe Tessitore (play-by-play), Jordan Rodgers (analyst), and Katie George (sideline reporter)

Game information

First quarter

- (10:53) UGA – Dillon Bell 8-yard pass from Gunner Stockton, Peyton Woodring kick (Drive: 8 plays, 75 yards, 4:07; Georgia 7–0)
- (6:32) FLA – Eugene Wilson III 40-yard pass from DJ Lagway, Trey Smack kick (Drive: 1 play, 40 yards, 0:07; Tied 7–7)
- (11:05) FLA – Trey Smack 22-yard field goal (Drive: 5 plays, 34 yards, 2:40; Florida 10–7)

Second quarter

- (0:12) UGA – Peyton Woodring 39-yard field goal (Drive: 7 plays, 42 yards, 0:54; Tied 10–10)

Third quarter

- (10:46) UGA – Noah Thomas 22-yard pass from Gunner Stockton, Peyton Woodring kick (Drive: 5 plays, 74 yards, 2:43; Georgia 17–10)
- (3:37) FLA – Jadan Baugh 2-yard run, Trey Smack kick (Drive: 12 plays, 79 yards, 7:05; Tied 17–17)

Fourth quarter

- (14:52) FLA – Trey Smack 54-yard field goal (Drive: 5 plays, 26 yards, 2:15; Florida 20–17)
- (4:36) UGA – Chauncey Bowens 36-yard run, Peyton Woodring kick (Drive: 7 plays, 82 yards, 3:18; Georgia 24–20)

Statistics	UGA	FLA
First downs	21	16
Plays–yards	68–361	56–281
Rushes–yards	39–138	32–115
Passing yards	223	166
Passing: comp–att–int	20–29–1	15–24–0
Turnovers	1	0
Time of possession	32:25	27:35

Team	Category	Player	Statistics
Georgia	Passing	Gunner Stockton	20/29, 223 yards, 2 TD, INT
Georgia	Rushing	Chauncey Bowens	9 carries, 70 yards, TD
Georgia	Receiving	Zachariah Branch	10 receptions, 112 yards
Florida	Passing	DJ Lagway	15/24, 166 yards, TD
Florida	Rushing	Jadan Baugh	15 carries, 72 yards, TD
Florida	Receiving	Eugene Wilson III	9 receptions, 121 yards, TD

=== at Kentucky (rivalry) ===
Florida Gators (3–5) at Kentucky Wildcats (3–5) – Game summary

Quarter	1	2	3	4	Total
Gators	7	0	0	0	7
Wildcats	3	21	7	7	38

at Kroger Field • Lexington, Kentucky

- Date: November 8
- Game time: 7:30 p.m.
- Game weather: Clear • Temperature: 54 °F (12 °C) • Wind: S 6 mph
- Game attendance: 56,388
- Referee: Steve Marlowe
- TV announcers (SECN): Tom Hart (play-by-play), Jordan Rodgers (analyst) and Cole Cubelic (sideline)

Game information

First quarter

- (6:42) UK – Jacob Kauwe 39-yard field goal (Drive: 10 plays, 30 yards, 3:52; Kentucky 3–0)
- (1:12) FLA – Jadan Baugh 10-yard pass from DJ Lagway, Trey Smack kick (Drive: 3 plays, 13 yards, 1:10; Florida 7–3)

Second quarter

- (12:39) UK – J.J. Hester 29-yard pass from Cutter Boley, Jacob Kauwe kick (Drive: 9 plays, 75 yards, 3:33; Kentucky 10–7)
- (3:32) UK – Jason Patterson 15-yard pass from Cutter Boley, Jacob Kauwe kick (Drive: 12 plays, 59 yards, 6:11; Kentucky 17–7)
- (1:26) UK – Seth McGowan 2-yard run, Jacob Kauwe kick (Drive: 5 plays, 54 yards, 1:12; Kentucky 24–7)

Third quarter

- (7:34) UK – Seth McGowan 5-yard run, Jacob Kauwe kick (Drive: 13 plays, 75 yards, 7:26; Kentucky 31–7)

Fourth quarter

- (12:16) UK – Dante Dowdell 65-yard run, Jacob Kauwe kick (Drive: 6 plays, 89 yards, 3:15; Kentucky 38–7)

Statistics	FLA	UK
First downs	13	22
Plays–yards	52–189	57–379
Rushes–yards	32–104	44–233
Passing yards	143	168
Passing: comp–att–int	20–37–3	18–23–1
Turnovers	4	4
Time of possession	28:27	31:33

Team	Category	Player	Statistics
Florida	Passing	DJ Lagway	11/19, 83 yards, TD, 3 INT
Florida	Rushing	Jadan Baugh	17 carries, 64 yards
Florida	Receiving	J. Michael Sturdivant	3 receptions, 29 yards
Kentucky	Passing	Cutter Boley	18/23, 168 yards, 2 TD, INT
Kentucky	Rushing	Dante Dowdell	7 carries, 104 yards, TD
Kentucky	Receiving	Kendrick Law	6 receptions, 44 yards

=== at No. 7 Ole Miss ===
Florida Gators (3–6) at No. 7 Ole Miss Rebels (9–1) – Game summary

Quarter	1	2	3	4	Total
Gators	7	17	0	0	24
No. 7 Rebels	10	10	0	14	34

at Vaught–Hemingway Stadium • Oxford, Mississippi

- Date: November 15
- Game time: 6:00 p.m.
- Game weather: Clear • Temperature: 68 °F (20 °C) • Wind: SW at 8 miles per hour (13 km/h)
- Game attendance: 68,138
- Referee: Matt Loeffler
- TV announcers (ESPN): Bob Wischusen (play-by-play), Louis Riddick (color), and Kris Budden (sideline)

Game information

First quarter

- MISS – Kewan Lacy 3-yard run (Lucas Carneiro kick), 9:09. Rebels 7–0. Drive: 12 plays, 80 yards, 4:56.
- MISS – Lucas Carneiro 27-yard field goal, 3:58. Rebels 10–0. Drive: 7 plays, 62 yards, 3:09.
- FLA – DJ Lagway 5-yard run (Trey Smack kick), 1:13. Rebels 10–7. Drive: 7 plays, 75 yards, 2:45.

Second quarter

- FLA – Jadan Baugh 2-yard run (Trey Smack kick), 14:56. Gators 14–10. Drive: 2 plays, 5 yards, 1:07.
- MISS – De'Zhaun Stribling 43-yard pass from Trinidad Chambliss (Lucas Carneiro kick), 9:39. Rebels 17–14. Drive: 10 plays, 75 yards, 5:17.
- FLA – J. Michael Sturdivant 57-yard pass from DJ Lagway (Trey Smack kick), 6:54. Gators 21–17. Drive: 5 plays, 75 yards, 2:45.
- MISS – Lucas Carneiro 23-yard field goal, 1:52. Gators 21–20. Drive: 13 plays, 69 yards, 5:02.
- FLA – Trey Smack 38-yard field goal, 0:03. Gators 24–20. Drive: 12 plays, 55 yards, 1:49.

Third quarter

- No scoring plays.

Fourth quarter

- MISS – Kewan Lacy 1-yard run (Lucas Carneiro kick), 14:57. Rebels 27–24. Drive: 6 plays, 86 yards, 1:48.
- MISS – Kewan Lacy 4-yard run (Lucas Carneiro kick), 1:43. Rebels 34–24. Drive: 1 play, 4 yards, 0:05.

Statistics	FLA	MISS
First downs	14	27
Plays–yards	57–326	83–538
Rushes–yards	25–108	48–237
Passing yards	218	301
Passing: comp–att–int	16–31–1	26–35–1
Turnovers	1	1
Time of possession	22:03	37:57

Team	Category	Player	Statistics
Florida	Passing	DJ Lagway	16/31, 218 yards, TD, INT
Florida	Rushing	Jadan Baugh	15 carries, 61 yards, TD
Florida	Receiving	TJ Abrams	3 receptions, 76 yards
Ole Miss	Passing	Trinidad Chambliss	26/35, 301 yards, TD, INT
Ole Miss	Rushing	Kewan Lacy	31 carries, 224 yards, 3 TD
Ole Miss	Receiving	De'Zhaun Stribling	4 receptions, 76 yards, TD

=== No. 20 Tennessee (rivalry) ===
No. 20 Tennessee Volunteers (7–3) at Florida Gators (3–7) – Game summary

Quarter	1	2	3	4	Total
No. 20 Volunteers	14	17	0	0	31
Gators	0	0	3	8	11

at Ben Hill Griffin Stadium • Gainesville, Florida

- Date: November 22
- Game time: 7:30 p.m.
- Game weather: Sunny • Temperature: 82 °F (28 °C)
- Game attendance: 90,465
- Referee: Daniel Gautreaux
- TV announcers (ABC): Chris Fowler (play-by-play), Kirk Herbstreit (analyst) and Holly Rowe (sideline)

Game information

First quarter

- TENN – Ethan Davis 23-yard pass from Joey Aguilar (Max Gilbert kick), 11:28. Volunteers 7–0. Drive: 9 plays, 75 yards, 3:32.
- TENN – DeSean Bishop 1-yard run (Max Gilbert kick), 5:33. Volunteers 14–0. Drive: 7 plays, 60 yards, 3:13.

Second quarter

- TENN – DeSean Bishop 1-yard run (Max Gilbert kick), 13:08. Volunteers 21–0. Drive: 12 plays, 67 yards, 6:00.
- TENN – Star Thomas 1-yard run (Max Gilbert kick), 9:14. Volunteers 28–0. Drive: 4 plays, 46 yards, 1:49.
- TENN – Max Gilbert 26-yard field goal, 0:00. Volunteers 31–0. Drive: 8 plays, 72 yards, 1:15.

Third quarter

- FLA – Trey Smack 46-yard field goal, 2:04. Volunteers 31–3. Drive: 13 plays, 71 yards, 8:00.

Fourth quarter

- FLA – Jadan Baugh 33-yard pass from DJ Lagway (DJ Lagway-Tony Livingston pass), 8:15. Volunteers 31–11. Drive: 7 plays, 68 yards, 3:29.

Statistics	TENN	FLA
First downs	28	15
Plays–yards	73–452	47–261
Rushes–yards	51–248	30–145
Passing yards	204	116
Passing: comp–att–int	17-22-0	11-17-0
Turnovers	0	0
Time of possession	35:42	24:18

Team	Category	Player	Statistics
Tennessee	Passing	Joey Aguilar	17/22, 204 yards, TD
Tennessee	Rushing	DeSean Bishop	24 carries, 116 yards, 2 TD
Tennessee	Receiving	Ethan Davis	5 receptions, 72 yards, TD
Florida	Passing	DJ Lagway	11/17, 116 yards, TD
Florida	Rushing	Jadan Baugh	18 carries, 96 yards
Florida	Receiving	Jadan Baugh	2 receptions, 35 yards, TD

=== Florida State (rivalry) ===
Florida State Seminoles (5–6) at Florida Gators (3–8) – Game summary

Quarter	1	2	3	4	Total
Seminoles	0	14	0	7	21
Gators	10	7	14	9	40

at Ben Hill Griffin Stadium • Gainesville, Florida

- Date: November 29
- Game time: 4:30 p.m.
- Game weather: Cloudy • Temperature: 68 °F (20 °C) • Wind: NE at 6 mph (9.7 km/h)
- Game attendance: 90,007
- Referee: Adam Savoie
- TV announcers (ESPN2): Jay Alter (play-by-play), Rocky Boiman (analyst) and Marilyn Payne (sideline)

Game information

First quarter

- (9:25) FLA – Trey Smack 23-yard field goal (Drive: 8 plays, 50 yards, 3:38; Florida 3–0)
- (2:49) FLA – J. Michael Sturdivant 5-yard pass from DJ Lagway, Trey Smack kick (Drive: 11 plays, 76 yards, 4:35; Florida 10–0)

Second quarter

- (13:39) FSU – Micahi Danzy 13-yard pass from Tommy Castellanos, Jake Weinberg kick (Drive: 9 plays, 75 yards, 4:10; Florida 10–7)
- (5:38) FLA – Tony Livingston 9-yard pass from DJ Lagway, Trey Smack kick (Drive: 13 plays, 75 yards, 8:01; Florida 17–7)
- (1:11) FSU – Tommy Castellanos 4-yard run, Jake Weinberg kick (Drive: 4 plays, 21 yards, 1:11; Florida 17–14)

Third quarter

- (9:47) FLA – Hayden Hansen 3-yard pass from DJ Lagway, Trey Smack kick (Drive: 3 plays, 40 yards, 1:12; Florida 24–14)
- (2:55) FLA – Jadan Baugh 22-yard run, Trey Smack kick (Drive: 8 plays, 58 yards, 5:33; Florida 31–14)

Fourth quarter

- (7:38) FLA – Trey Smack 54-yard field goal (Drive: 9 plays, 41 yards, 6:34; Florida 34–14)
- (3:07) FSU – Lawayne McCoy 17-yard pass from Tommy Castellanos, Jake Weinberg kick (Drive: 11 plays, 83 yards, 4:26; Florida 34–21)
- (0:56) FLA – Jadan Baugh 12-yard run (Drive: 8 plays, 46 yards, 2:10; Florida 40–21)

Statistics	FSU	FLA
First downs	24	26
Plays–yards	65–407	69–440
Rushes–yards	37–167	45–272
Passing yards	240	168
Passing: comp–att–int	17–28–1	15–24–1
Turnovers	2	1
Time of possession	25:18	34:42

Team	Category	Player	Statistics
Florida State	Passing	Tommy Castellanos	17/28, 240 yards, 2 TD, INT
Florida State	Rushing	Tommy Castellanos	19 carries, 77 yards, TD
Florida State	Receiving	Lawayne McCoy	6 receptions, 110 yards, TD
Florida	Passing	DJ Lagway	15/24, 168 yards, 3 TD, INT
Florida	Rushing	Jadan Baugh	38 carries, 266 yards, 2 TD
Florida	Receiving	J. Michael Sturdivant	3 receptions, 58 yards, TD

== Roster ==
2025 Florida Gators football team roster
Players
Coaches
Offense

Pos.	#	Name	Class
WR	0	Naeshaun Montgomery	Fr
QB	2	DJ Lagway	So
WR	3	Eugene Wilson III	So
WR	4	TJ Abrams	Fr
RB	5	Treyaun Webb	So
WR	6	Dallas Wilson	Fr
TE	7	Amir Jackson	Fr
WR	8	Vernell Brown III	Fr
WR	9	J. Michael Sturdivant	Sr
WR	10	Tank Hawkins	So
WR	11	Aidan Mizell	So
QB	12	Aaron Williams	Fr
RB	13	Jadan Baugh	So
WR	14	Muizz Tounkara	Fr
QB	15	Harrison Bailey	GS
QB	16	Aidan Warner	So
QB	17	Tramell Jones Jr.	Fr
QB	18	Clay Millen	Sr
WR	19	Alex Gonzalez	Jr
RB	20	Duke Clark	Fr
RB	21	KD Daniels	Fr
WR	22	Kahleil Jackson	Sr
RB	23	Chad Gasper Jr.	Fr
RB	24	Ja'Kobi Jackson	Sr
RB	25	Anthony Rubio	So
RB	27	Byron Louis	Fr
WR	30	Taylor Spierto	Sr
RB	33	Brian Case	Fr
RB	34	Kelvin Jimenez	Fr
WR	35	DeBraun Hampton	Fr
WR	43	Jaden Edgecombe	So
TE	44	Scott Isacks	Jr
OL	50	Jason Zandamela	Fr
OL	53	Bryce Lovett	So
OL	55	TJ Dice Jr.	Fr
OL	56	Jahari Medlock	Fr
OL	57	Devon Manuel	Sr
OL	58	Austin Barber	Sr
OL	59	Hayden Clem	Sr
OL	63	Caden Jones	So
OL	66	Jake Slaughter	Sr
OL	68	Fletcher Westphal	Fr
OL	70	Damieon George Jr.	Sr
OL	71	Roderick Kearney	So
OL	73	Daniel Pierre Louis	Fr
OL	74	Noel Portnjagin	Fr
OL	75	Kamryn Waites	Sr
OL	76	Mark Faircloth	Fr
OL	77	Knijeah Harris	Jr
OL	78	Marcus Mascoll	Fr
OL	79	Enoch Wangoy	Fr
WR	80	Cary Rifenberick	Fr
WR	81	Mike Peterson Jr.	Fr
WR	83	Jackson Wade	So
TE	84	Micah Jones	Fr
TE	86	Tony Livingston	Jr
TE	87	Cameron Kossmann	Fr
TE	89	Hayden Hansen	Jr

Defense

Pos.	#	Name	Class
DB	0	Sharif Denson	Jr
DB	2	Lagonza Hayward	Fr
DB	3	Onis Konanbanny	Fr
DB	4	Teddy Foster	Fr
ILB	5	Myles Graham	So
DB	6	J'Vari Flowers	Fr
ILB	7	Ty Jackson	Fr
ILB	8	Aaron Chiles	So
DB	9	Drake Stubbs	Fr
ILB	10	Grayson Howard	Jr
EDGE	11	LJ McCray	So
DB	12	Ben Hanks III	Fr
DB	13	Aaron Gates	So
DB	14	Jordan Castell	Jr
EDGE	15	Jayden Woods	Fr
DB	16	Micheal Caraway Jr.	Sr
EDGE	17	Titus Bullard	Fr
DB	18	Bryce Thornton	Jr
EDGE	22	Kofi Asare	Jr
DB	23	Josiah Davis	Fr
EDGE	24	Kamran James	Jr
DB	25	Cormani McClain	So
DB	26	Jamroc Grimsley	Fr
DB	27	Dijon Johnson	Jr
DB	28	Devin Moore	Sr
ILB	29	Jaden Robinson	Jr
DB	31	Evan Jackson	Fr
DB	32	Cahron Rackley	Sr
DL	33	Brien Taylor Jr.	Sr
EDGE	34	George Gumbs Jr.	Sr
DB	35	Harold Stubbs IV	Jr
DB	36	Vincent Brown Jr.	So
DB	37	Javion Toombs	Jr
DB	39	Brayden Slade	So
ILB	42	Matthew Kade	Fr
DB	43	Alfonzo Allen Jr.	Sr
ILB	44	Myles Johnson	Fr
EDGE	45	Layne Swafford	So
EDGE	48	Erich Seager	Jr
EDGE	49	Jalen Wiggins	Fr
ILB	50	Jake Xeller	Fr
ILB	52	Dylan Leighton	Fr
EDGE	55	Charles Emanuel III	Fr
DL	61	Nicolas Flynn	Jr
DL	88	Caleb Banks	Sr
DL	90	Brendan Bett	So
DL	91	Jeramiah McCloud	Fr
DL	92	Sebastian Scott	So
DL	93	Michai Boireau	So
EDGE	94	Tyreak Sapp	Sr
DL	95	Jamari Lyons	Jr
DL	96	Tarvorise Brown	So
DL	97	Joseph Mbatchou	Fr

Special teams

Pos.	#	Name	Class
P	19	Tommy Doman	Sr
K	29	Trey Smack	Sr
K	32	Evan Noel	Fr
P	38	Nicholas Inglis	Fr
LS	39	Mack Mulhern	Fr
K	40	Brandon Rabasco	Fr
LS	42	Rocco Underwood	Sr
P	46	Hayden Craig	Fr

Head coach

- Billy Gonzales – Interim/wide receivers

Coordinators/assistant coaches

- Ron Roberts – Executive head coach/defensive coordinator
- Russ Callaway – Offensive coordinator/tight ends
- Jabbar Juluke – Associate head coach/running backs
- Robert Bala – Co-defensive coordinator/inside linebackers
- Vinnie Sunseri – Co-defensive coordinator/safeties
- Rob Sale – Offensive line
- Gerald Chatman – Defensive line
- Mike Peterson – Edges/alumni liaison
- Jonathan Decoster – Assistant offensive line
- Joe Houston – Special teams coordinator
- Ryan O'Hara – Quarterbacks
- Deron Wilson – Defensive backs
- Tyler Miles – Director of strength & conditioning

Legend

- (C) Team captain
- (S) Suspended
- (I) Ineligible
- Injured
- Redshirt

Roster
Last update: September 26, 2025
