= 2026 Campbell Fighting Camels football team =

American college football season

2026 Campbell Fighting Camels football
- Conference: CAA Football

Ranking
- STATS: No. 22
- FCS Coaches: No. 21
- Record: 8–4 (5–3 CAA)
- Head coach: Braxton Harris (3rd season)
- Offensive coordinator: Matt Kubik (3rd season)
- Defensive coordinator: Brandon Butcher (1st season)
- Home stadium: Barker–Lane Stadium

2026 Coastal Athletic Association Football Conference standings
	Conf.			Overall
Team	W		L	W		L
No. 18 Monmouth $^	7	–	0	8	–	3
No. 22 Campbell	5	–	2	8	–	3
Albany	5	–	2	7	–	4
Bryant	5	–	2	7	–	4
North Carolina A&T	4	–	3	5	–	6
Elon	4	–	3	6	–	5
Sacred Heart	4	–	4	4	–	6
Stony Brook	3	–	4	5	–	6
New Hampshire	3	–	4	4	–	7
Towson	3	–	4	3	–	8
Rhode Island	2	–	5	5	–	6
Maine	1	–	6	1	–	9
Hampton	0	–	7	1	–	10
$ – Conference champion; ^ – FCS playoff participant; As of November 22, 2026; Rankings from STATS Poll

The 2026 Campbell Fighting Camels football team represent Campbell University as a member of Coastal Athletic Association Football Conference (CAA) during the 2026 NCAA Division I FCS football season. The Fighting Camels are led by third-year head coach Braxton Harris, and play their home games at Barker–Lane Stadium in Buies Creek, North Carolina.

== Schedule ==
Date	Time	Opponent	Rank	Site	TV	Result	Attendance
August 29	6:00 p.m.	at East Tennessee State*		William B. Greene Jr. Stadium; Johnson City, TN	FloFootball	W 49–37	9,132
September 6	11:00 a.m.	No. 24 Western Carolina*		Barker–Lane Stadium; Buies Creek, NC	FloFootball	W 28–19	4,212
September 12	5:30 p.m.	at Florida*		Ben Hill Griffin Stadium; Gainesville, FL	SECN+	L 3–52	88,863
September 19	6:00 p.m.	North Carolina A&T		Barker–Lane Stadium; Buies Creek, NC	FloFootball	W 42–14	5,109
September 26	6:00 p.m.	at Hampton	No. 22	Armstrong Stadium; Hampton, VA	FloFootball	W 44–20	3,209
October 3	6:00 p.m.	at North Carolina Central*	No. 18	O'Kelly-Riddick Stadium; Durham, NC	MEAC Network	W 38–31	2,136
October 17	3:30 p.m.	Towson^{†}	No. 16	Barker–Lane Stadium; Buies Creek, NC	FloFootball	W 24–20	5,309
October 24	1:00 p.m.	at Maine	No. 13	Alfond Sports Stadium; Orono, ME	FloFootball	W 35–6	4,629
October 31	12:00 p.m.	at Albany	No. 12	Bob Ford Field; Albany, NY	FloFootball	L 35–45	3,301
November 7	1:00 p.m.	Stony Brook	No. 16	Barker–Lane Stadium; Buies Creek, NC	FloFootball	W 48–35	4,020
November 14	2:00 p.m.	at Elon	No. 16	Rhodes Stadium; Elon, NC	FloFootball	L 24–28	6,791
November 21	1:00 p.m.	No. 18 Monmouth	No. 22	Barker–Lane Stadium; Buies Creek, NC	FloFootball	L 49–55	4,588
*Non-conference game; ^{†}Homecoming; Rankings from STATS Poll released prior to the game; All times are in Eastern time

== Game summaries ==
=== at East Tennessee State ===
Campbell Fighting Camels (0–0) at East Tennessee State Buccaneers (0–0) – Game summary

Quarter	1	2	3	4	Total
Fighting Camels	14	14	7	14	49
Buccaneers	7	17	0	13	37

at William B. Greene Jr. Stadium • Johnson City, Tennessee

- Date: August 29
- Game time: 5:30 PM
- Game weather: Sunny • Temperature: 83 °F (28 °C) • Wind: NW at 4 miles per hour (6.4 km/h)
- Game attendance: 9,132
- Referee: Brian Hilpisch
- TV announcers (ESPN+): Keith Brake (play-by-play) and Mark Hutsell (analyst), Kennedy Story (sideline)

Game information

First quarter

- (12:07) CAM – Evan Austin 30-yard pass from Kamden Sixkiller, Alex Crabb kick (Drive: 8 plays, 75 yards, 2:53; Fighting Camels 7–0)
- (6:32) ETSU – Trey Weary 18-yard pass from Mason Mims, Ewan Johnson kick (Drive: 3 plays, 76 yards, 1:21; Tied 7–7)
- (0:31) CAM – Ethan Lawrence 3-yard run, Alex Crabb kick (Drive: 12 plays, 75 yards, 6:01; Fighting Camels 14–7)

Second quarter

- (13:49) ETSU – Jason Albritton 6-yard run, Ewan Johnson kick (Drive: 4 plays, 75 yards, 1:42; Tied 14–14)
- (10:25) ETSU – TJ Peyton 3-yard run, Ewan Johnson kick (Drive: 5 plays, 45 yards, 2:17; Buccaneers 21–14)
- (6:20) CAM – Kamden Sixkiller 5-yard run, Alex Crabb kick (Drive: 7 plays, 75 yards, 4:05; Tied 21–21)
- (0:25) CAM – Stevie Keener 26-yard pass from Kamden Sixkiller, Alex Crabb kick (Drive: 6 plays, 64 yards, 1:23; Fighting Camels 28–21)
- (0:00) ETSU – Ewan Johnson 44-yard field goal (Drive: 5 plays, 48 yards, 0:25; Fighting Camels 28–24)

Third quarter

- (0:28) CAM – Devon Thomas 2-yard run, Alex Crabb kick (Drive: 6 plays, 65 yards, 2:57; Fighting Camels 35–24)

Fourth quarter

- (14:16) CAM – Devon Thomas 1-yard run, Alex Crabb kick (Drive: 1 plays, 1 yards, 0:05; Fighting Camels 42–24)
- (10:34) ETSU – D'Marius Rucker 4-yard run (Drive: 9 plays, 65 yards, 3:42; Fighting Camels 42–30)
- (5:34) ETSU – Brandon Winton 6-yard pass from Mason Mims, Ewan Johnson kick (Drive: 10 plays, 80 yards, 4:03; Fighting Camels 42–37)
- (1:53) CAM – Kamden Sixkiller 14-yard run, Alex Crabb kick (Drive: 6 plays, 82 yards, 3:41; Fighting Camels 49–37)

Statistics	CAM	ETSU
First downs	24	27
Plays–yards	73–514	74–528
Rushes–yards	31–171	33–155
Passing yards	343	373
Passing: Comp–Att–Int	29–42–0	33–41–0
Turnovers	0	2
Time of possession	32:53	27:07

Team	Category	Player	Statistics
Campbell	Passing	Kamden Sixkiller	29/42, 343 yards, 2 TD
Campbell	Rushing	Kamden Sixkiller	10 carries, 95 yards, 2 TD
Campbell	Receiving	Evan Austin	4 receptions, 93 yards, TD
East Tennessee State	Passing	Mason Mims	33/41, 373 yards, 2 TD
East Tennessee State	Rushing	TJ Peyton	15 carries, 80 yards, TD
East Tennessee State	Receiving	Suderian Harrison	5 receptions, 99 yards

=== No. 24 Western Carolina ===
No. 24 Western Carolina Catamounts (1–0) at Campbell Fighting Camels (1–0) – Game summary

Quarter	1	2	3	4	Total
No. 24 Catamounts	0	10	3	6	19
Fighting Camels	14	14	0	0	28

at Barker–Lane Stadium • Buies Creek, North Carolina

- Date: September 6
- Game time: 10:00 a.m.
- Game weather: Sunny • Temperature: 80 °F (27 °C) • Wind: SW at 8 miles per hour (13 km/h)
- Game attendance: 4,212
- Referee: Justin Ackley
- TV: FloFootball

Game information

First quarter

- CAM – Brady Ambrose 6-yard pass from Kamden Sixkiller (Alex Crabb kick), 9:25. Fighting Camels 7–0. Drive: 10 plays, 91 yards, 5:29.
- CAM – Kamden Sixkiller 8-yard run (Alex Crabb kick), 4:00. Fighting Camels 14–0. Drive: 7 plays, 53 yards, 3:28.

Second quarter

- WCU – Bryan McCollum 23-yard field goal, 14:49. Fighting Camels 14–3. Drive: 7 plays, 39 yards, 2:02.
- CAM – Ethan Lawrence 1-yard run (Alex Crabb kick), 10:17. Fighting Camels 21–3. Drive: 5 plays, 64 yards, 1:21.
- WCU – Jai Boyd 48-yard pass from Lex Thomas (Bryan McCollum kick), 2:57. Fighting Camels 21–10. Drive: 7 plays, 73 yards, 3:11.
- CAM – Spencer Jones 32-yard pass from Kamden Sixkiller (Alex Crabb kick), 0:18. Fighting Camels 28–10. Drive: 5 plays, 82 yards, 0:30.

Third quarter

- WCU – Bryan McCollum 40-yard field goal, 9:49. Fighting Camels 28–13. Drive: 4 plays, -14 yards, 1:57.

Fourth quarter

- WCU – Jai Boyd 1-yard pass from Lex Thomas (Bryan McCollum kick failed), 9:24. Fighting Camels 28–19. Drive: 11 plays, 65 yards, 3:16.

Statistics	WCU	CAM
First downs	16	26
Plays–yards	62–327	83–528
Rushes–yards	18–1	39–198
Passing yards	326	330
Passing: comp–att–int	25–44–0	29–44–3
Turnovers	0	3
Time of possession	23:58	36:02

Team	Category	Player	Statistics
Western Carolina	Passing	Lex Thomas	25/44, 326 yards, 2 TD
Western Carolina	Rushing	Derrick Davis Jr.	3 carries, 6 yards
Western Carolina	Receiving	AJ Colombo	6 receptions, 91 yards
Campbell	Passing	Kamden Sixkiller	29/44, 330 yards, 2 TD, 3 INT
Campbell	Rushing	JJ Cowan	11 carries, 83 yards
Campbell	Receiving	Spencer Jones	7 receptions, 126 yards, TD

=== at Florida (FBS) ===
Campbell Fighting Camels (2–0) at Florida Gators (FBS) (1–0) – Game summary

Quarter	1	2	3	4	Total
Fighting Camels	3	0	0	0	3
Gators (FBS)	10	35	7	0	52

at Ben Hill Griffin Stadium • Gainesville, Florida

- Date: September 12
- Game time: 5:30 p.m.
- Game weather: Sunny • Temperature: 88 °F (31 °C) • Wind: WSW at 9 miles per hour (14 km/h)
- Game attendance: 88,863
- Referee: Steven Robinson
- TV announcers (SECN+): Ted Emrich and Fozzy Whittaker

Game information

First quarter

- CU – Alex Crabb 29-yard field goal, 12:18. Fighting Camels 3–0. Drive: 7 plays, 63 yards, 2:42.
- FLA – Aaron Philo 3-yard run (Patrick Durkin kick), 8:11. Gators 7–3. Drive: 9 plays, 56 yards, 4:03.
- FLA – Patrick Durkin 28-yard field goal, 1:13. Gators 10–3. Drive: 9 plays, 70 yards, 3:58.

Second quarter

- FLA – Vernell Brown III 64-yard punt return (Patrick Durkin kick), 14:38. Gators 17–3.
- FLA – Vernell Brown III 70-yard punt return (Patrick Durkin kick), 11:13. Gators 24–3.
- FLA – Dallas Wilson 40-yard pass from Aaron Philo (Patrick Durkin kick), 9:06. Gators 31-3. Drive: 2 plays, 36 yards, 0:50.
- FLA – Vernell Brown III 14-yard pass from Aaron Philo (Patrick Durkin kick), 3:30. Gators 38-3. Drive: 8 plays, 85 yards, 4:22.
- FLA – Jadan Baugh 2-yard run (Patrick Durkin kick), 0:20. Gators 45-3. Drive 6 plays, 44 yards, 1:35.

Third quarter

- FLA – Jadan Baugh 75-yard run (Patrick Durkin kick), 3:28. Gators 52-3. Drive: 2 plays, 80 yards, 0:45.

Fourth quarter

- No scoring plays.

Statistics	CAM	FLA
First downs	11	24
Plays–yards	62–210	62–514
Rushes–yards	25–62	30–214
Passing yards	148	300
Passing: comp–att–int	21–38–0	24–32–1
Turnovers	2	2
Time of possession	31:35	28:25

Team	Category	Player	Statistics
Campbell	Passing	Kamden Sixkiller	16/30, 127 yards
Campbell	Rushing	JJ Cowan	7 carries, 29 yards
Campbell	Receiving	Stevie Keener	2 receptions, 57 yards
Florida	Passing	Aaron Philo	16/21, 242 yards, 2 TD
Florida	Rushing	Jadan Baugh	14 carries, 136 yards, 2 TD
Florida	Receiving	Dallas Wilson	5 receptions, 104 yards, TD

=== North Carolina A&T ===
North Carolina A&T Aggies (0–3) at Campbell Fighting Camels (2–1) – Game summary

Quarter	1	2	3	4	Total
Aggies	0	0	0	0	0
Fighting Camels	0	0	0	0	0

at Barker–Lane Stadium • Buies Creek, North Carolina

- Date: September 19
- Game time: 6:00 p.m.
- TV: FloFootball

Game information

First quarter
Second quarter
Third quarter
Fourth quarter

Statistics	NCAT	CAM
First downs		
Plays–yards		
Rushes–yards		
Passing yards		
Passing: comp–att–int		
Turnovers		
Time of possession		

Team	Category	Player	Statistics
North Carolina A&T	Passing		
North Carolina A&T	Rushing		
North Carolina A&T	Receiving		
Campbell	Passing		
Campbell	Rushing		
Campbell	Receiving		

=== at Hampton ===
No. 22 Campbell Fighting Camels (3–1) at Hampton Pirates (1–3) – Game summary

Quarter	1	2	3	4	Total
No. 22 Fighting Camels	0	0	0	0	0
Pirates	0	0	0	0	0

at Armstrong Stadium • Hampton, Virginia

- Date: September 26
- Game time: 6:00 PM

Game information

First quarter
Second quarter
Third quarter
Fourth quarter

Statistics	CAM	HAMP
First downs		
Plays–yards		
Rushes–yards		
Passing yards		
Passing: Comp–Att–Int		
Turnovers		
Time of possession		

Team	Category	Player	Statistics
Campbell	Passing		
Campbell	Rushing		
Campbell	Receiving		
Hampton	Passing		
Hampton	Rushing		
Hampton	Receiving		

=== at North Carolina Central ===
No. 18 Campbell Fighting Camels (3–2) at North Carolina Central Eagles (2–3) – Game summary

Quarter	1	2	3	4	Total
No. 18 Fighting Camels	0	0	0	0	0
Eagles	0	0	0	0	0

at O'Kelly–Riddick Stadium • Durham, North Carolina

- Date: October 3
- Game time: 6:00 p.m.
- TV: MEAC Network

Game information

First quarter
Second quarter
Third quarter
Fourth quarter

Statistics	CAM	NCCU
First downs		
Plays–yards		
Rushes–yards		
Passing yards		
Passing: comp–att–int		
Turnovers		
Time of possession		

Team	Category	Player	Statistics
Campbell	Passing		
Campbell	Rushing		
Campbell	Receiving		
North Carolina Central	Passing		
North Carolina Central	Rushing		
North Carolina Central	Receiving		

=== Towson ===
Towson Tigers (0–7) at No. 16 Campbell Fighting Camels (5–1) – Game summary

Quarter	1	2	3	4	Total
Tigers	0	0	0	0	0
No. 16 Fighting Camels	0	0	0	0	0

at Barker–Lane Stadium • Buies Creek, North Carolina

- Date: October 17
- Game time: 3:30 p.m.

Game information

First quarter
Second quarter
Third quarter
Fourth quarter

Statistics	TOW	CAM
First downs		
Plays–yards		
Rushes–yards		
Passing yards		
Passing: comp–att–int		
Turnovers		
Time of possession		

Team	Category	Player	Statistics
Towson	Passing		
Towson	Rushing		
Towson	Receiving		
Campbell	Passing		
Campbell	Rushing		
Campbell	Receiving		

=== at Maine ===
No. 13 Campbell Fighting Camels (6–1) at Maine Black Bears (1–6) – Game summary

Quarter	1	2	3	4	Total
No. 13 Fighting Camels	0	0	0	0	0
Black Bears	0	0	0	0	0

at Alfond Sports Stadium • Orono, Maine

- Date: October 24
- Game time: 1:00 p.m.
- TV announcers (FloSports): TBD

Game information

First quarter
Second quarter
Third quarter
Fourth quarter

Statistics	CAM	ME
First downs		
Plays–yards		
Rushes–yards		
Passing yards		
Passing: comp–att–int		
Turnovers		
Time of possession		

Team	Category	Player	Statistics
Campbell	Passing		
Campbell	Rushing		
Campbell	Receiving		
Maine	Passing		
Maine	Rushing		
Maine	Receiving		

=== at Albany ===
No. 12 Campbell Fighting Camels (7–1) at Albany Great Danes (5–3) – Game summary

Quarter	1	2	3	4	Total
No. 12 Fighting Camels	0	0	0	0	0
Great Danes	0	0	0	0	0

at Tom & Mary Casey Stadium • Albany, New York

- Date: October 31
- Game time: 12:00 p.m.
- TV announcers (FloSports): TBD

Game information

First quarter
Second quarter
Third quarter
Fourth quarter

Statistics	CAM	ALB
First downs		
Plays–yards		
Rushes–yards		
Passing yards		
Passing: comp–att–int		
Turnovers		
Time of possession		

Team	Category	Player	Statistics
Campbell	Passing		
Campbell	Rushing		
Campbell	Receiving		
Albany	Passing		
Albany	Rushing		
Albany	Receiving		

=== Stony Brook ===
Stony Brook Seawolves (5–4) at No. 16 Campbell Fighting Camels (7–2) – Game summary

Quarter	1	2	3	4	Total
Seawolves	-	-	-	-	0
No. 16 Fighting Camels	-	-	-	-	0

at Barker–Lane Stadium • Buies Creek, North Carolina

- Date: November 7
- Game time: 1:00 p.m.
- TV: FloSports

Game information

First quarter
Second quarter
Third quarter
Fourth quarter

Statistics	STBK	CAM
First downs		
Plays–yards		
Rushes–yards		
Passing yards		
Passing: Comp–Att–Int		
Turnovers		
Time of possession		

Team	Category	Player	Statistics
Stony Brook	Passing		
Stony Brook	Rushing		
Stony Brook	Receiving		
Campbell	Passing		
Campbell	Rushing		
Campbell	Receiving		

=== at Elon ===
No. 16 Campbell Fighting Camels (8–2) at Elon Phoenix (5–5) – Game summary

Quarter	1	2	3	4	Total
No. 16 Fighting Camels	0	0	0	0	0
Phoenix	0	0	0	0	0

at Rhodes Stadium • Elon, North Carolina

- Date: November 14
- Game time: 2:00 p.m.
- TV: FloSports

Game information

First quarter
Second quarter
Third quarter
Fourth quarter

Statistics	CAM	ELON
First downs		
Plays–yards		
Rushes–yards		
Passing yards		
Passing: comp–att–int		
Turnovers		
Time of possession		

Team	Category	Player	Statistics
Campbell	Passing		
Campbell	Rushing		
Campbell	Receiving		
Elon	Passing		
Elon	Rushing		
Elon	Receiving		

=== No. 22 Monmouth ===
No. 18 Monmouth Hawks (8–3) at No. 22 Campbell Fighting Camels (8–3) – Game summary

Quarter	1	2	3	4	Total
No. 18 Hawks	0	0	0	0	0
No. 22 Fighting Camels	0	0	0	0	0

at Barker–Lane Stadium • Buies Creek, North Carolina

- Date: November 21
- Game time: 1:00 p.m.

Game information

First quarter
Second quarter
Third quarter
Fourth quarter

Statistics	MONM	CAM
First downs		
Plays–yards		
Rushes–yards		
Passing yards		
Passing: comp–att–int		
Turnovers		
Time of possession		

Team	Category	Player	Statistics
Monmouth	Passing		
Monmouth	Rushing		
Monmouth	Receiving		
Campbell	Passing		
Campbell	Rushing		
Campbell	Receiving		

== Rankings ==
Ranking movements Legend: ██ Increase in ranking ██ Decrease in ranking — = Not ranked RV = Received votes
	Week														
Poll	Pre	1	2	3	4	5	6	7	8	9	10	11	12	13	Final
STATS	—	—	RV	RV	22	18	17	16	13	12	16	16	22		
Coaches	—	—	RV	RV	RV	24	20	18	16	15	19	16	21		
