= 2026 Florida Gators football team =

American college football season

2026 Florida Gators football
- Conference: Southeastern Conference

Ranking
- Coaches: No. 25
- AP: No. 23
- CFP: No. 24
- Record: 7–4 (5–4 SEC)
- Head coach: Jon Sumrall (1st season)
- Offensive coordinator: Buster Faulkner (1st season)
- Offensive scheme: Pro spread
- Defensive coordinator: Brad White (1st season)
- Base defense: Multiple
- Home stadium: Ben Hill Griffin Stadium

2026 Southeastern Conference football standings
| | Conf. | | | Overall |
| Team | W | | L | W | | L |
|---|---|---|---|---|---|---|
| No. 1 Georgia y | 8 | – | 1 | 10 | – | 1 |
| No. 5 Texas | 6 | – | 2 | 9 | – | 2 |
| No. 9 Tennessee | 6 | – | 2 | 9 | – | 2 |
| No. 3 Alabama | 6 | – | 2 | 9 | – | 2 |
| No. 22 Oklahoma | 5 | – | 3 | 7 | – | 4 |
| No. 24 Florida | 5 | – | 4 | 7 | – | 4 |
| No. 16 Kentucky | 5 | – | 4 | 7 | – | 4 |
| No. 25 Ole Miss | 4 | – | 4 | 7 | – | 4 |
| Auburn | 4 | – | 4 | 7 | – | 4 |
| Missouri | 4 | – | 4 | 7 | – | 4 |
| No. 21 South Carolina | 4 | – | 5 | 6 | – | 5 |
| LSU | 3 | – | 5 | 6 | – | 5 |
| Mississippi State | 2 | – | 6 | 5 | – | 6 |
| Arkansas | 2 | – | 6 | 4 | – | 7 |
| Texas A&M | 1 | – | 7 | 4 | – | 7 |
| Vanderbilt | 1 | – | 7 | 4 | – | 7 |
Championship: Georgia vs TBD
^ – College Football Playoff participant; $ – Conference champion; y – Championship game participant; As of November 22, 2026; Rankings from CFP rankings

The 2026 Florida Gators football team represents the University of Florida as a member of the Southeastern Conference (SEC) during the 2026 NCAA Division I FBS football season. The Gators are led by first-year head coach Jon Sumrall and play their home games at Ben Hill Griffin Stadium in Gainesville, Florida.

== Schedule ==
On September 12, the Gators played the Fighting Camels for the first time in program history. The annual rivalry game vs. Georgia will not be held in Jacksonville for the first time since 1995 due to renovations at EverBank Stadium, instead being held at Mercedes-Benz Stadium in Atlanta, GA. The 2027 matchup will be held at Raymond James Stadium in Tampa, FL.

| Date | Time | Opponent | Rank | Site | TV | Result | Attendance |
|---|---|---|---|---|---|---|---|
| September 5 | 7:45 p.m. | Florida Atlantic* | | Ben Hill Griffin Stadium; Gainesville, FL | SECN | W 66–21 | 90,295 |
| September 12 | 5:30 p.m. | Campbell* | | Ben Hill Griffin Stadium; Gainesville, FL | SECN+ | W 52–3 | 88,863 |
| September 19 | 7:00 p.m. | at Auburn | | Jordan–Hare Stadium; Auburn, AL (rivalry, SEC Nation) | ESPN | W 44–39 | 88,043 |
| September 26 | 3:30 p.m. | No. 4 Ole Miss | No. 21 | Ben Hill Griffin Stadium; Gainesville, FL (SEC Nation) | ABC | W 52–28 | 90,683 |
| October 3 | 3:30 p.m. | at No. 25 Missouri | No. 8 | Faurot Field; Columbia, MO | ABC | L 17–45 | 63,609 |
| October 10 | 12:45 p.m. | South Carolina^{†} | No. 16 | Ben Hill Griffin Stadium; Gainesville, FL | SECN | L 19–38 | 90,311 |
| October 17 | 12:00 p.m. | at No. 7 Texas | | Darrell K Royal–Texas Memorial Stadium; Austin, TX | ABC | W 27–24 | 103,989 |
| October 31 | 3:30 p.m. | vs. No. 3 Georgia | No. 17 | Mercedes-Benz Stadium; Atlanta, GA (rivalry) | ABC | L 8–27 | 72,541 |
| November 7 | 7:45 p.m. | Oklahoma | No. 24 | Ben Hill Griffin Stadium; Gainesville, FL | SECN | L 7–23 | 90,442 |
| November 14 | 6:15 p.m. | at No. 11 Kentucky | | Kroger Field; Lexington, KY (rivalry) | ESPN | W 21–14 | 61,866 |
| November 21 | 12:00 p.m. | Vanderbilt | No. 24 | Ben Hill Griffin Stadium; Gainesville, FL | SECN | W 34–27 | 88,025 |
| November 27 | 3:30 p.m. | at Florida State* | | Doak Campbell Stadium; Tallahassee, FL (Sunshine Showdown) | ABC | | |
*Non-conference game; ^{†}Homecoming; Rankings from AP Poll (and CFP Rankings, after November 3) - Released prior to game; All times are in Eastern time

== Rankings ==
Ranking movements Legend: ██ Increase in ranking ██ Decrease in ranking — = Not ranked RV = Received votes т = Tied with team above or below
| | Week | | | | | | | | | | | | | | | |
| Poll | Pre | 1 | 2 | 3 | 4 | 5 | 6 | 7 | 8 | 9 | 10 | 11 | 12 | 13 | 14 | Final |
|---|---|---|---|---|---|---|---|---|---|---|---|---|---|---|---|---|
| AP | RV | RV | RV | 21 | 8 | 16 | RV | 20 | 17 | 25 | — | 23 | | | | |
| Coaches | RV | 25т | RV | 22 | 8 | 15 | RV | 24 | 20 | RV | — | 25 | | | | |
| CFP | Not released | | | | | | | | | 24 | — | 24 | | | | Not released |

== Game summaries ==
=== vs. Florida Atlantic ===
Florida Atlantic Owls (0–0) at Florida Gators (0–0) – Game summary

| Quarter | 1 | 2 | 3 | 4 | Total |
|---|---|---|---|---|---|
| Owls | 0 | 14 | 7 | 0 | 21 |
| Gators | 17 | 21 | 14 | 14 | 66 |

at Ben Hill Griffin Stadium • Gainesville, Florida

- Date: September 5
- Game time: 7:30 p.m.
- Game weather: Cloudy • Temperature: 83 °F (28 °C) • Wind: SW at 3 miles per hour (4.8 km/h)
- Game attendance: 90,295
- Referee: James Carter
- TV announcers (SECN): Matt Schumacker, Aaron Murray, and Taylor Davis

Game information

First quarter

- FLA – Vernell Brown III 49-yard pass from Aaron Philo (Patrick Durkin kick), 8:41. Gators 7–0. Drive: 7 plays, 94 yards, 3:20.
- FLA – Bailey Stockton 12-yard pass from Aaron Philo (Patrick Durkin kick), 6:28. Gators 14–0. Drive: 3 plays, 48 yards, 0:50.
- FLA – Patrick Durkin 53-yard field goal, 2:06. Gators 17–0. Drive: 7 plays, 42 yards, 3:24.

Second quarter

- FAU – Ethan Ervin 1-yard run (Collin Rogers kick), 13:54. Gators 17–7. Drive: 13 plays, 75 yards, 3:12.
- FLA – Aaron Philo 3-yard run (Patrick Durkin kick), 11:02. Gators 24–7. Drive: 6 plays, 75 yards, 2:52.
- FAU – Caden Veltkamp 7-yard run (Collin Rogers kick), 6:50. Gators 24–14. Drive: 12 plays, 78 yards, 4:07.
- FLA – Jadan Baugh 12-yard run (Patrick Durkin kick), 4:05. Gators 31–14. Drive: 8 plays, 75 yards, 2:45.
- FLA – Jadan Baugh 7-yard run (Patrick Durkin kick), 2:50. Gators 38–14. Drive: 3 plays, 29 yards, 1:10.

Third quarter

- FLA – Jadan Baugh 6-yard run (Patrick Durkin kick), 13:08. Gators 45–14. Drive: 4 plays, 75 yards, 1:52.
- FLA – Duke Clark 10-yard pass from Aaron Philo (Patrick Durkin kick), 4:21. Gators 52–14. Drive: 8 plays, 79 yards, 4:47.
- FAU – Kelby Valsin 20-yard pass from Caden Veltkamp (Collin Rogers kick), 1:15. Gators 52–21. Drive: 9 plays, 75 yards, 3:06.

Fourth quarter

- FLA – Duke Clark 4-yard run (Patrick Durkin kick), 12:24. Gators 59–21. Drive: 8 plays, 75 yards, 3:51.
- FLA – Micah Jones 6-yard pass from Tramell Jones Jr. (Liam Padron kick), 0:25. Gators 66–21. Drive: 11 plays, 89 yards, 6:14.

| Statistics | FAU | FLA |
|---|---|---|
| First downs | 25 | 30 |
| Plays–yards | 90–396 | 67–624 |
| Rushes–yards | 37–120 | 41–281 |
| Passing yards | 276 | 343 |
| Passing: comp–att–int | 34–53–2 | 20–26–1 |
| Turnovers | 3 | 1 |
| Time of possession | 28:24 | 31:36 |

| Team | Category | Player | Statistics |
|---|---|---|---|
| FAU | Passing | Caden Veltkamp | 34/52, 276 yards, TD, 2 INT |
| FAU | Rushing | Leonard Farrow | 10 carries, 51 yards |
| FAU | Receiving | Kelby Vaslin | 10 receptions, 96 yards, TD |
| Florida | Passing | Aaron Philo | 16/21, 275 yards, 3 TD, INT |
| Florida | Rushing | Jadan Baugh | 14 carries, 160 yards, 3 TD |
| Florida | Receiving | Vernell Brown III | 6 receptions, 117 yards, TD |

=== vs. Campbell (FCS) ===
Campbell Fighting Camels (FCS) (2–0) at Florida Gators (1–0) – Game summary

| Quarter | 1 | 2 | 3 | 4 | Total |
|---|---|---|---|---|---|
| Fighting Camels (FCS) | 3 | 0 | 0 | 0 | 3 |
| Gators | 10 | 35 | 7 | 0 | 52 |

at Ben Hill Griffin Stadium • Gainesville, Florida

- Date: September 12
- Game time: 5:30 p.m.
- Game weather: Sunny • Temperature: 88 °F (31 °C) • Wind: WSW at 9 miles per hour (14 km/h)
- Game attendance: 88,863
- Referee: Steven Robinson
- TV announcers (SECN+): Ted Emrich and Fozzy Whittaker

Game information

First quarter

- CU – Alex Crabb 29-yard field goal, 12:18. Fighting Camels 3–0. Drive: 7 plays, 63 yards, 2:42.
- FLA – Aaron Philo 3-yard run (Patrick Durkin kick), 8:11. Gators 7–3. Drive: 9 plays, 56 yards, 4:03.
- FLA – Patrick Durkin 28-yard field goal, 1:13. Gators 10–3. Drive: 9 plays, 70 yards, 3:58.

Second quarter

- FLA – Vernell Brown III 64-yard punt return (Patrick Durkin kick), 14:38. Gators 17–3.
- FLA – Vernell Brown III 70-yard punt return (Patrick Durkin kick), 11:13. Gators 24–3.
- FLA – Dallas Wilson 40-yard pass from Aaron Philo (Patrick Durkin kick), 9:06. Gators 31–3. Drive: 2 plays, 36 yards, 0:50.
- FLA – Vernell Brown III 14-yard pass from Aaron Philo (Patrick Durkin kick), 3:30. Gators 38–3. Drive: 8 plays, 85 yards, 4:22.
- FLA – Jadan Baugh 2-yard run (Patrick Durkin kick), 0:20. Gators 45–3. Drive 6 plays, 44 yards, 1:35.

Third quarter

- FLA – Jadan Baugh 75-yard run (Patrick Durkin kick), 3:28. Gators 52–3. Drive: 2 plays, 80 yards, 0:45.

Fourth quarter

- No scoring plays.

| Statistics | CAM | FLA |
|---|---|---|
| First downs | 11 | 24 |
| Plays–yards | 62–210 | 62–514 |
| Rushes–yards | 25–62 | 30–214 |
| Passing yards | 148 | 300 |
| Passing: comp–att–int | 21–38–0 | 24–32–1 |
| Turnovers | 2 | 2 |
| Time of possession | 31:35 | 28:25 |

| Team | Category | Player | Statistics |
|---|---|---|---|
| Campbell | Passing | Kamden Sixkiller | 16/30, 127 yards |
| Campbell | Rushing | JJ Cowan | 7 carries, 29 yards |
| Campbell | Receiving | Stevie Keener | 2 receptions, 57 yards |
| Florida | Passing | Aaron Philo | 16/21, 242 yards, 2 TD |
| Florida | Rushing | Jadan Baugh | 14 carries, 136 yards, 2 TD |
| Florida | Receiving | Dallas Wilson | 5 receptions, 104 yards, TD |

=== at Auburn (rivalry) ===
Florida Gators (2–0) at Auburn Tigers (2–0) – Game summary

| Quarter | 1 | 2 | 3 | 4 | Total |
|---|---|---|---|---|---|
| Gators | 7 | 13 | 14 | 10 | 44 |
| Tigers | 3 | 14 | 7 | 15 | 39 |

at Jordan–Hare Stadium • Auburn, Alabama

- Date: September 19
- Game time: 7:00 p.m.
- Game weather: Cloudy • Temperature: 74 °F (23 °C) • Wind: SW at 7 miles per hour (11 km/h)
- Game attendance: 88,043
- Referee: Adam Savoie
- TV announcers (ESPN): Tom Hart, Roddy Jones, and Quint Kessenich

Game information

First quarter

- FLA – Jadan Baugh 2-yard run (Patrick Durkin kick), 12:06. Gators 7–0. Drive: 3 plays, 41 yards, 2:06.
- AUB – Alex McPherson 40-yard field goal, 8:08. Gators 7–3. Drive 4 plays, -14 yards, 1:45.

Second quarter

- FLA – Duke Clark 20-yard run (Patrick Durkin kick), 14:49. Gators 14–3. Drive: 16 plays, 75 yards, 8:19.
- AUB – Jeremiah Cobb 2-yard run (Alex McPherson kick), 12:38. Gators 14–10. Drive: 8 plays, 75 yards, 2:11.
- FLA – Patrick Durkin 26-yard field goal, 8:15. Gators 17–10. Drive: 11 plays, 67 yards, 4:23.
- AUB – Keshaun Singleton 4-yard pass from Byrum Brown (Alex McPherson kick), 5:21. Tied 17–17. Drive: 9 plays, 75 yards, 2:54.
- FLA – Patrick Durkin 28-yard field goal, 0:09. Gators 20–17. Drive: 11 plays, 65 yards, 5:12.

Third quarter

- FLA – Jadan Baugh 33-yard run (Patrick Durkin kick), 13:34. Gators. 27–17. Drive: 3 plays, 75 yards, 1:26.
- FLA – Dallas Wilson 20-yard pass from Aaron Philo (Patrick Durkin kick), 6:30. Gators 34–17. Drive: 12 plays, 69 yards, 6:29.
- AUB – De'Shawn Spencer 10-yard pass from Byrum Brown (Alex McPherson kick), 1:24. Gators 34–24. Drive: 15 plays, 75 yards, 5:06.

Fourth quarter

- FLA – Jadan Baugh 53-yard run (Patrick Durkin kick), 12:38. Gators 41–24. Drive: 7 plays, 75 yards, 3:46.
- AUB – Byrum Brown 21-yard run (Arlis Boardingham pass), 6:10. Gators 41–32. Drive: 7 plays, 90 yards, 2:35.
- FLA – Patrick Durkin 40-yard field goal, 2:53. Gators 44–32. Drive: 8 plays, 21 yards, 3:16.
- AUB – Chas Nimrod 35-yard pass from Byrum Brown (Alex McPherson kick). 0:24. Gators 44–39. Drive: 8 plays, 75 yards, 2:29.

| Statistics | FLA | AUB |
|---|---|---|
| First downs | 24 | 22 |
| Plays–yards | 76–495 | 66–373 |
| Rushes–yards | 31–102 | 53–243 |
| Passing yards | 252 | 271 |
| Passing: comp–att–int | 20–35–1 | 16–23–1 |
| Time of possession | 20:44 | 39:16 |

| Team | Category | Player | Statistics |
|---|---|---|---|
| Florida | Passing | Aaron Philo | 15/22, 204 yards, TD, 1 INT |
| Florida | Rushing | Jadan Baugh | 26 carries, 162 yards, 3 TD |
| Florida | Receiving | Vernell Brown III | 5 receptions, 86 yards |
| Auburn | Passing | Byrum Brown | 20/35, 271 yards, 3 TD, 1 INT |
| Auburn | Rushing | Byrum Brown | 18 carries, 65 yards, TD |
| Auburn | Receiving | Keshaun Singleton | 7 receptions, 99 yards, TD |

=== vs. No. 4 Ole Miss ===
No. 4 Ole Miss Rebels (3–0) at No. 21 Florida Gators (3–0) – Game summary

| Quarter | 1 | 2 | 3 | 4 | Total |
|---|---|---|---|---|---|
| No. 4 Rebels | 0 | 6 | 15 | 7 | 28 |
| No. 21 Gators | 10 | 7 | 14 | 21 | 52 |

at Ben Hill Griffin Stadium • Gainesville, Florida

- Date: September 26
- Game time: 3:30 p.m.
- Game weather: Sunny • Temperature: 82 °F (28 °C) • Wind: E at 5 miles per hour (8.0 km/h)
- Game attendance: 90,683
- Referee: Steve Marlow
- TV announcers (ABC): Sean McDonough, Greg McElroy and Katie George

Game information

First quarter

- FLA – Jadan Baugh 4-yard run (Patrick Durkin kick), 10:53. Gators 7–0. Drive: 8 plays, 65 yards, 3:59.
- FLA – Patrick Durkin 49-yard field goal, 9:00. Gators 10–0. Drive: 4 plays, 0 yards, 0:16.

Second quarter

- OLE – Lucas Carneiro 36-yard field goal, 10:13. Gators 10–3. Drive: 5 plays, 30 yards, 2:21.
- FLA – Jadan Baugh 2-yard run (Patrick Durkin kick), 2:51. Gators 17–3. Drive: 15 plays, 87 yards, 7:17.
- OLE – Lucas Carneiro 46-yard field goal, 1:11. Gators 17–6. Drive: 8 plays, 47 yards, 1:40.

Third quarter

- OLE – Trinidad Chambliss 8-yard run (Horatio Fields pass), 13:03. Gators 17–14. Drive: 5 plays, 80 yards, 01:53.
- FLA – Duke Clark 45-yard run (Patrick Durkin kick), 11:32. Gators 24–14. Drive: 4 plays, 87 yards, 1:23.
- OLE – Trinidad Chambliss 10-yard run (Lucas Carneiro kick), 5:21. Gators 24–21. Drive: 14 plays, 74 yards, 6:05.
- FLA – Aaron Philo 1-yard run (Patrick Durkin kick), 3:45. Gators 31–21. Drive: 3 plays, 26 yards, 1:25.

Fourth quarter

- FLA – Dallas Wilson 6-yard run (Patrick Durkin kick), 13:38. Gators 38–21. Drive: 7 plays, 57 yards, 4:03.
- OLE – Deuce Alexander 2-yard pass from Trinidad Chambliss (Lucas Carneiro kick), 12:09. Gators 38–28. Drive: 4 plays, 76 yards, 1:21.
- FLA – Amir Jackson 5-yard pass from Aaron Philo (Patrick Durkin kick), 9:19. Gators 45–28. Drive: 5 plays, 64 yards, 2:50.
- FLA – Jadan Baugh 2-yard run (Patrick Durkin kick), 4:00. Gators 52–28. Drive: 8 plays, 63 yards, 4:42.

| Statistics | MISS | FLA |
|---|---|---|
| First downs | 25 | 27 |
| Plays–yards | 61–426 | 76–498 |
| Rushes–yards | 27–128 | 53–302 |
| Passing yards | 298 | 196 |
| Passing: comp–att–int | 25–34–1 | 16–23–0 |
| Turnovers | 2 | 0 |
| Time of possession | 23:01 | 36:59 |

| Team | Category | Player | Statistics |
|---|---|---|---|
| Ole Miss | Passing | Trinidad Chambliss | 25/34, 298 yards, TD, INT |
| Ole Miss | Rushing | Trinidad Chambliss | 7 carries, 44 yards, 2 TD, FUM |
| Ole Miss | Receiving | Deuce Alexander | 7 receptions, 134 yards, TD |
| Florida | Passing | Aaron Philo | 16/23, 196 yards, TD |
| Florida | Rushing | Jadan Baugh | 29 carries, 142 yards, 3 TD |
| Florida | Receiving | Eric Singleton Jr. | 1 reception, 38 yards |

=== at No. 25 Missouri ===
No. 8 Florida Gators (4–0) at No. 25 Missouri Tigers (3–1) – Game summary

| Quarter | 1 | 2 | 3 | 4 | Total |
|---|---|---|---|---|---|
| No. 8 Gators | 3 | 7 | 0 | 7 | 17 |
| No. 25 Tigers | 3 | 17 | 10 | 15 | 45 |

at Faurot Field • Columbia, Missouri

- Date: October 3
- Game time: 3:30 p.m.
- Game weather: Sunny • Temperature: 74 °F (23 °C) • Wind: SE at 6 miles per hour (9.7 km/h)
- Game attendance: 63,609
- Referee: Ted Pitts
- TV announcers (ABC): Joe Tessitore, Jesse Palmer and Kris Budden

Game information

First quarter

- FLA – Patrick Durkin 20-yard field goal, 8:06. Gators 3–0. Drive: 15 plays, 73 yards, 6:54.
- MIZ – Blake Craig 32-yard field goal, 3:15. Tied 3–3. Drive: 12 plays, 62 yards, 4:51.

Second quarter

- MIZ – Donovan Olugbode 47-yard pass from Austin Simmons (Blake Craig kick), 10:06. Tigers 10–3. Drive: 6 plays, 68 yards, 2:55.
- FLA – Dallas Wilson 12-yard pass from Aaron Philo (Patrick Durkin kick), 4:26. Tied 10–10. Drive: 7 plays, 68 yards, 3:23.
- MIZ – Caleb Goodie Sr. 31-yard pass from Austin Simmons (Blake Craig kick), 2:05. Tigers 17–10. Drive: 5 plays, 75 yards, 2:21.
- MIZ – Blake Craig 50-yard field goal, 0:00. Tigers 20–10. Drive: 7 plays, 49 yards, 1:33.

Third quarter

- MIZ – Jamal Roberts 5-yard run (Blake Craig kick), 12:24. Tigers 27–10. Drive: 6 plays, 75 yards, 2:36.
- MIZ – Blake Craig 52-yard field goal, 4:30. Tigers 30–10. Drive: 10 plays, 49 yards, 4:23.

Fourth quarter

- MIZ – Jamal Roberts 1-yard run (Cayden Lee pass), 14:55. Tigers 38–10. Drive: 4 plays, 80 yards, 1:50.
- MIZ – Jamal Roberts 80-yard run (Cayden Lee pass), 13:33. Tigers 45–10. Drive: 1 play, 80 yards, 0:12.
- FLA – TJ Abrams 42-yard pass from Tramell Jones Jr. (Patrick Durkin kick), 0:47. Tigers 45–17. Drive: 7 plays, 94 yards, 1:52.

| Statistics | FLA | MIZ |
|---|---|---|
| First downs | 19 | 24 |
| Plays–yards | 64–325 | 66–560 |
| Rushes–yards | 25–42 | 36–220 |
| Passing yards | 283 | 340 |
| Passing: comp–att–int | 26–39–0 | 23–30–0 |
| Time of possession | 28:20 | 31:40 |

| Team | Category | Player | Statistics |
|---|---|---|---|
| Florida | Passing | Aaron Philo | 21/34, 197 yards, TD |
| Florida | Rushing | London Montgomery | 1 carry, 17 yards |
| Florida | Receiving | Dallas Wilson | 4 receptions, 66 yards, TD |
| Missouri | Passing | Austin Simmons | 23/30, 340 yards, 2 TD |
| Missouri | Rushing | Jamal Roberts | 24 carries, 211 yards, 3 TD |
| Missouri | Receiving | Cayden Lee | 8 receptions, 110 yards |

=== vs. South Carolina ===
South Carolina Gamecocks (2–3) at No. 16 Florida Gators (4–1) – Game summary

| Quarter | 1 | 2 | 3 | 4 | Total |
|---|---|---|---|---|---|
| Gamecocks | 7 | 10 | 14 | 7 | 38 |
| No. 16 Gators | 7 | 3 | 3 | 6 | 19 |

at Ben Hill Griffin Stadium • Gainesville, Florida

- Date: October 10
- Game time: 12:45 p.m.
- Game weather: Cloudy • Temperature: 84 °F (29 °C) • Wind: SSE at 8 miles per hour (13 km/h)
- Game attendance: 90,311
- Referee: Tim Barker
- TV announcers (SEC Network): Taylor Zarzour, Matt Stinchcomb, and Tori Petry

Game information

First quarter

- FLA – Bailey Stockton 59-yard pass from Aaron Philo (Patrick Durkin kick), 11:25. Gators 7–0. Drive: 3 plays, 63 yards, 0:50.
- SC – Nyck Harbor 15-yard pass from LaNorris Sellers (Malik Orsan kick), 0:12. Tied 7–7. Drive: 10 plays, 65 yards, 3:40.

Second quarter

- FLA – Patrick Durkin 21-yard field goal, 8:50. Gators 10–7. Drive: 13 plays, 72 yards, 6:22.
- SC – Malik Orsan 37-yard field goal, 4:09. Tied 10–10. Drive: 10 plays, 56 yards, 4:41.
- SC – Mazeo Bennett Jr. 12-yard pass from LaNorris Sellers (Malik Orsan kick), 1:47. Gamecocks 17–10. Drive: 5 plays, 26 yards, 1:42.

Third quarter

- FLA – Patrick Durkin 48-yard field goal, 11:17. Gamecocks 17–13. Drive: 9 plays, 45 yards, 3:43.
- SC – Donovan Murph 26-yard pass from LaNorris Sellers (Malik Orsan kick), 8:36. Gamecocks 24–13. Drive: 6 plays, 75 yards, 2:41.
- SC – LaNorris Sellers 1-yard run (Malik Orsan kick), 1:08. Gamecocks 31–13. Drive: 10 plays, 59 yards, 4:14.

Fourth quarter

- SC – Lex Cyrus 21-yard pass from LaNorris Sellers (Malik Orsan kick), 8:36. Gamecocks 38–13. Drive: 3 plays, 27 yards, 1:21.
- FLA – Jadan Baugh 2-yard run, 1:01. Gamecocks 38–19. Drive: 10 plays, 57 yards, 3:07.

| Statistics | SC | FLA |
|---|---|---|
| First downs | 22 | 20 |
| Plays–yards | 72-393 | 74-387 |
| Rushes–yards | 37–114 | 38–120 |
| Passing yards | 279 | 267 |
| Passing: comp–att–int | 23–35–0 | 27–36–2 |
| Time of possession | 30:37 | 29:23 |

| Team | Category | Player | Statistics |
|---|---|---|---|
| South Carolina | Passing | LaNorris Sellers | 23/35, 276 yards, 4 TD |
| South Carolina | Rushing | Matt Fuller | 10 carries, 52 yards |
| South Carolina | Receiving | Nyck Harbor | 4 receptions, 83 yards, TD |
| Florida | Passing | Aaron Philo | 21/28, 227 yards, TD, INT |
| Florida | Rushing | Jadan Baugh | 15 carries, 59 yards, TD |
| Florida | Receiving | Bailey Stockton | 8 receptions, 127 yards, TD |

=== at No. 7 Texas ===
Florida Gators (4–2) at No. 7 Texas Longhorns (4–1) – Game summary

| Quarter | 1 | 2 | 3 | 4 | Total |
|---|---|---|---|---|---|
| Gators | 0 | 10 | 7 | 10 | 27 |
| No. 7 Longhorns | 10 | 7 | 0 | 7 | 24 |

at Darrell K Royal–Texas Memorial Stadium • Austin, Texas

- Date: October 17
- Game time: 12:00 p.m.
- Game weather: Sunny • Temperature: 59 °F (15 °C) • Wind: NNE at 7 miles per hour (11 km/h)
- Game attendance: 103,989
- Referee: David Smith
- TV announcers (ABC): Joe Tessitore, Jesse Palmer and Kris Budden

Game information

First quarter

- UT – Raleek Brown 32-yard run (Gianni Spetic kick), 11:42. Longhorns 7–0. Drive: 7 plays, 75 yards, 3:18.
- UT – Gianni Spetic 38-yard field goal, 6:42. Longhorns 10–0. Drive: 8 plays, 60 yards, 2:52.

Second quarter

- FLA – Patrick Durkin 45-yard field goal, 13:42. Longhorns 10–3. Drive: 8 plays, 37 yards, 3:47.
- UT – Ryan Niblett 63-yard punt return, 11:27. Longhorns 17–3.
- FLA – Lacota Dippre 7-yard pass from Tramell Jones Jr. (Patrick Durkin kick), 0:18. Longhorns 17–10. Drive: 9 plays, 49 yards, 2:26.

Third quarter

- FLA – Lacota Dippre 8-yard pass from Tramell Jones Jr. (Patrick Durkin kick), 6:50. Tied 17–17. Drive: 15 plays, 69 yards, 8:03.

Fourth quarter

- FLA – Patrick Durkin 28-yard field goal, 10:40. Gators 20–17. Drive: 14 plays, 57 yards, 6:31.
- FLA – Jadan Baugh 11-yard run (Patrick Durkin kick), 6:22. Gators 27–17. Drive: 6 plays, 45 yards, 2:08.
- UT – Cam Coleman 9-yard pass from Arch Manning (Gianni Spetic kick), 4:21. Gators 27–24. Drive: 6 plays, 75 yards, 2:01.

| Statistics | FLA | TEX |
|---|---|---|
| First downs | 21 | 13 |
| Plays–yards | 81–313 | 50–272 |
| Rushes–yards | 46–158 | 30–99 |
| Passing yards | 155 | 173 |
| Passing: comp–att–int | 22–35–0 | 14–20–0 |
| Time of possession | 38:11 | 21:49 |

| Team | Category | Player | Statistics |
|---|---|---|---|
| Florida | Passing | Tramell Jones Jr. | 22/35, 155 yards, 2 TD |
| Florida | Rushing | Jadan Baugh | 25 carries, 91 yards, TD |
| Florida | Receiving | Eric Singleton Jr. | 7 receptions, 43 yards |
| Texas | Passing | Arch Manning | 14/20, 173 yards, TD |
| Texas | Rushing | Hollywood Smothers | 12 carries, 52 yards |
| Texas | Receiving | Emmett Mosley V | 2 receptions, 76 yards |

=== vs. No. 3 Georgia (rivalry) ===
No. 17 Florida Gators (5–2) vs No. 3 Georgia Bulldogs (6–1) – Game summary

| Quarter | 1 | 2 | 3 | 4 | Total |
|---|---|---|---|---|---|
| No. 17 Gators | 0 | 0 | 0 | 8 | 8 |
| No. 3 Bulldogs | 7 | 17 | 0 | 3 | 27 |

at Mercedes-Benz Stadium • Atlanta, Georgia

- Date: October 31
- Game time: 3:30 p.m.
- Game weather: Indoors • Temperature: 71 °F (22 °C) • Wind: E at 13 miles per hour (21 km/h)
- Game attendance: 72,541
- Referee: Steve Marlowe
- TV announcers (ABC): Chris Fowler, Kirk Herbstreit, and Holly Rowe

Game information

First quarter

- UGA – Nate Frazier 1-yard run (Peyton Woodring kick), 1:50. Bulldogs 7–0. Drive: 8 plays, 41 yards, 4:12.

Second quarter

- UGA – Peyton Woodring 28-yard field goal, 8:55. Bulldogs 10–0. Drive: 4 plays, 7 yards, 2:04.
- UGA – Bo Walker 1-yard run (Peyton Woodring kick), 1:55. Bulldogs 17–0. Drive: 10 plays, 81 yards, 4:17.
- UGA – Chris Cole 66-yard fumble recovery (Peyton Woodring kick). Bulldogs 24–0.

Fourth quarter

- FLA – Tramell Jones Jr. 2-yard run (Dallas Wilson pass), 6:59. Bulldogs 24–8. Drive: 9 plays, 48 yards, 4:12.
- UGA – Peyton Woodring 21-yard field goal, 3:34. Bulldogs 27–8. Drive: 9 plays, 61 yards, 3:26.

| Statistics | FLA | UGA |
|---|---|---|
| First downs | 15 | 19 |
| Plays–yards | 60–246 | 65–318 |
| Rushes–yards | 28–48 | 42–217 |
| Passing yards | 198 | 101 |
| Passing: comp–att–int | 23–32–3 | 13–23–0 |
| Time of possession | 27:50 | 32:11 |

| Team | Category | Player | Statistics |
|---|---|---|---|
| Florida | Passing | Tramell Jones Jr. | 18/25, 172 yards, INT |
| Florida | Rushing | Jadan Baugh | 17 carries, 38 yards |
| Florida | Receiving | Bailey Stockton | 8 receptions, 76 yards |
| Georgia | Passing | Gunnar Stockton | 13/23, 101 yards |
| Georgia | Rushing | Nate Frazier | 12 carries, 67 yards, TD |
| Georgia | Receiving | Craig Dandridge | 3 receptions, 39 yards |

=== vs. Oklahoma ===
Oklahoma Sooners (4–4) at No. 24 Florida Gators (5–3) – Game summary

| Quarter | 1 | 2 | 3 | 4 | Total |
|---|---|---|---|---|---|
| Sooners | 3 | 10 | 0 | 10 | 23 |
| No. 24 Gators | 0 | 7 | 0 | 0 | 7 |

at Ben Hill Griffin Stadium • Gainesville, Florida

- Date: November 7
- Game time: 7:45 p.m.
- Game weather: Clear • Temperature: 66 °F (19 °C) • Wind: S at 4 miles per hour (6.4 km/h)
- Game attendance: 90,442
- Referee: Jeff Heaser
- TV announcers (SECN): Matt Schumacker, Aaron Murray, and Taylor Davis

Game information

First quarter

- OU – Tate Sandell 41-yard field goal, 7:36. Sooners 3–0. Drive: 10 plays, 61 yards, 5:29.

Second quarter

- OU – Hayden Hansen 3-yard pass from John Mateer (Tate Sandell kick), 9:42. Sooners 10–0. Drive: 15 plays, 84 yards, 7:11.
- FLA – Jadan Baugh 15-yard run (Patrick Durkin kick), 3:00. Sooners 10–7. Drive: 4 plays, 52 yards, 2:03.
- OU – Tate Sandell 48-yard field goal, 0:36. Sooners 13–7. Drive: 8 plays, 44 yards, 2:20.

Fourth quarter

- OU – Isaiah Sategna III 6-yard pass from John Mateer (Tate Sandell kick), 4:56. Sooners 20–7. Drive: 20 plays, 89 yards, 12:45.
- OU – Tate Sandell 31-yard field goal, 1:56. Sooners 23–7. Drive: 6 plays, 4 yards, 2:24.

| Statistics | OU | FLA |
|---|---|---|
| First downs | 20 | 11 |
| Plays–yards | 73–351 | 47–203 |
| Rushes–yards | 40–144 | 20–75 |
| Passing yards | 207 | 133 |
| Passing: comp–att–int | 21–33–0 | 10–22–2 |
| Time of possession | 37:50 | 22:10 |

| Team | Category | Player | Statistics |
|---|---|---|---|
| Oklahoma | Passing | John Mateer | 21/33, 203 yards, 2 TD |
| Oklahoma | Rushing | John Mateer | 14 carries, 56 yards |
| Oklahoma | Receiving | Rocky Beers | 4 receptions, 72 yards |
| Florida | Passing | Tramell Jones Jr. | 10/22, 133 yards, 2 INT |
| Florida | Rushing | Jadan Baugh | 8 carries, 35 yards, TD |
| Florida | Receiving | Duke Clark | 4 receptions, 70 yards |

=== at No. 11 Kentucky (rivalry) ===
Florida Gators (5–4) at No. 11 Kentucky Wildcats (7–2) – Game summary

| Quarter | 1 | 2 | 3 | 4 | Total |
|---|---|---|---|---|---|
| Gators | 0 | 2 | 11 | 8 | 21 |
| No. 11 Wildcats | 7 | 0 | 7 | 0 | 14 |

at Kroger Field • Lexington, Kentucky

- Date: November 14
- Game time: 6:15 p.m.
- Game weather: Cloudy • Temperature: 43 °F (6 °C) • Wind: NW at 5 miles per hour (8.0 km/h)
- Game attendance: 61,866
- Referee: James Carter
- TV announcers (ESPN): Joe Tessitore, Jesse Palmer, and Kris Budden

Game information

First quarter

- UK – CJ Baxter 5-yard pass from Kenny Minchey (Adam Zouagui kick), 1:32. Wildcats 7–0. Drive: 15 plays, 86 yards, 8:20.

Second quarter

- FLA – 0-yard Safety, 2:06. Wildcats 7–2.

Third quarter

- FLA – Jadan Baugh 1-yard run (Aaron Philo rush), 10:06. Gators 10–7. Drive: 7 plays, 30 yards, 4:07.
- UK – Kenny Minchey 1-yard run (Adam Zouagui kick), 7:20. Wildcats 14–10. Drive: 6 plays, 45 yards, 2:42.
- FLA – Patrick Durkin 37-yard field goal, 3:16. Wildcats 14–13. Drive: 9 plays, 56 yards, 4:04.

Fourth quarter

- FLA – Aaron Philo 2-yard run (Dallas Wilson pass), 9:08. Gators 21–14. Drive: 14 plays, 67 yards, 7:30.

| Statistics | FLA | UK |
|---|---|---|
| First downs | 19 | 14 |
| Plays–yards | 72–330 | 53–242 |
| Rushes–yards | 48–211 | 27–61 |
| Passing yards | 119 | 181 |
| Passing: comp–att–int | 16–24–0 | 15–26–0 |
| Time of possession | 34:07 | 25:53 |

| Team | Category | Player | Statistics |
|---|---|---|---|
| Florida | Passing | Aaron Philo | 16/24, 119 yards |
| Florida | Rushing | Aaron Philo | 15 carries, 102 yards, TD |
| Florida | Receiving | Bailey Stockton | 4 receptions, 34 yards |
| Kentucky | Passing | Kenny Minchey | 15/26, 181 yards, TD |
| Kentucky | Rushing | Jason Patterson | 5 carries, 22 yards |
| Kentucky | Receiving | DJ Miller | 4 receptions, 80 yards |

=== vs. Vanderbilt ===
Vanderbilt Commodores (4–6) at No. 24 Florida Gators (6–4) – Game summary

| Quarter | 1 | 2 | 3 | 4 | Total |
|---|---|---|---|---|---|
| Commodores | 0 | 0 | 0 | 0 | 0 |
| No. 24 Gators | 0 | 0 | 0 | 0 | 0 |

at Ben Hill Griffin Stadium • Gainesville, Florida

- Date: November 21
- Game time: 12:00 p.m.
- TV announcers (SECN): Taylor Zarzour, Matt Stinchcomb, and Michella Chester

| Statistics | VAN | FLA |
|---|---|---|
| First downs | | |
| Plays–yards | | |
| Rushes–yards | | |
| Passing yards | | |
| Passing: comp–att–int | | |
| Time of possession | | |

| Team | Category | Player | Statistics |
|---|---|---|---|
| Vanderbilt | Passing | | |
| Vanderbilt | Rushing | | |
| Vanderbilt | Receiving | | |
| Florida | Passing | | |
| Florida | Rushing | | |
| Florida | Receiving | | |

=== at Florida State (Sunshine Showdown) ===
Florida Gators (7–4) at Florida State Seminoles (5–6) – Game summary

| Quarter | 1 | 2 | 3 | 4 | Total |
|---|---|---|---|---|---|
| Gators | 0 | 0 | 0 | 0 | 0 |
| Seminoles | 0 | 0 | 0 | 0 | 0 |

at Doak Campbell Stadium • Tallahassee, Florida

- Date: November 27
- Game time: 3:30 p.m.
- TV: ABC

| Statistics | FLA | FSU |
|---|---|---|
| First downs | | |
| Plays–yards | | |
| Rushes–yards | | |
| Passing yards | | |
| Passing: comp–att–int | | |
| Time of possession | | |

| Team | Category | Player | Statistics |
|---|---|---|---|
| Florida | Passing | | |
| Florida | Rushing | | |
| Florida | Receiving | | |
| Florida State | Passing | | |
| Florida State | Rushing | | |
| Florida State | Receiving | | |

== Roster ==
2026 Florida Gators football team roster
Players
Coaches
Offense

| Pos. | # | Name | Class |
|---|---|---|---|
| WR | 1 | Vernell Brown III | So |
| WR | 2 | Eric Singleton Jr. | Sr |
| WR | 3 | Bailey Stockton | Jr |
| WR | 4 | TJ Abrams | So |
| WR | 5 | Micah Mays Jr. | Jr |
| WR | 6 | Dallas Wilson | Fr |
| TE | 7 | Amir Jackson | So |
| QB | 9 | Tramell Jones Jr. | Fr |
| QB | 10 | Aaron Williams | So |
| QB | 11 | Will Griffin | Fr |
| QB | 12 | Aaron Philo | So |
| RB | 13 | Jadan Baugh | Jr |
| TE | 15 | Luke Harpring | So |
| QB | 16 | Aidan Warner | Jr |
| TE | 17 | Lacota Dippre | Jr |
| WR | 18 | Davian Groce | Fr |
| WR | 19 | Jaylen Lloyd | Jr |
| RB | 20 | Duke Clark | Fr |
| RB | 21 | Evan Pryor | Sr |
| WR | 22 | Kahleil Jackson | GS |
| RB | 24 | London Montgomery | Jr |
| RB | 25 | Anthony Rubio | Jr |
| RB | 27 | Byron Louis | Fr |
| RB | 33 | Brian Case | Fr |
| RB | 34 | Kelvin Jimenez | So |
| WR | 43 | Jaden Edgecombe | Jr |
| OL | 50 | Jason Zandamela | So |
| OL | 51 | Tyler Chukuyem | Fr |
| OL | 52 | Harrison Moore | Jr |
| OL | 53 | Bryce Lovett | Jr |
| OL | 54 | Javarii Luckas | Fr |
| OL | 55 | TJ Dice Jr. | Fr |
| OL | 56 | Jahari Medlock | Fr |
| OL | 59 | Corey Brown | Fr |
| OL | 61 | G'Nivre Carr | Fr |
| OL | 63 | Caden Jones | Jr |
| OL | 64 | Eagan Boyer | So |
| OL | 66 | Emeka Ugorji | So |
| OL | 67 | TJ Shanahan Jr. | Jr |
| OL | 68 | Fletcher Westphal | So |
| OL | 71 | Roderick Kearney | Jr |
| OL | 73 | Daniel Pierre Louis | Fr |
| OL | 76 | Mark Faircloth | So |
| OL | 77 | Knijeah Harris | Sr |
| OL | 78 | Desmond Green | Fr |
| OL | 79 | Chancellor Campbell | Fr |
| WR | 82 | Ace Ciongoli | Fr |
| WR | 83 | Justin Williams | Fr |
| TE | 84 | Micah Jones | Fr |
| TE | 85 | Evan Chieca | Jr |
| TE | 86 | Heze Kent | Fr |
| WR | 88 | Marquez Daniel | Fr |
| TE | 89 | Tripp Brown Jr. | Fr |

Defense

| Pos. | # | Name | Class |
|---|---|---|---|
| JACK | 0 | Jayden Woods | So |
| S | 1 | Bryce Thornton | Sr |
| S | 2 | Lagonza Hayward | So |
| CB | 3 | Onis Konanbanny | Fr |
| ILB | 5 | Myles Graham | Jr |
| CB | 6 | J'Vari Flowers | So |
| ILB | 7 | Ty Jackson | So |
| ILB | 8 | Aaron Chiles | Jr |
| S | 9 | Drake Stubbs | So |
| S | 10 | Cam Dooley | Jr |
| DL | 11 | LJ McCray | So |
| CB | 12 | Ben Hanks III | Fr |
| CB | 13 | Jordy Lowery | Sr |
| JACK | 14 | KJ Ford | Fr |
| CB | 15 | CJ Bronaugh | Fr |
| ILB | 16 | TJ Bullard | Sr |
| JACK | 17 | Titus Bullard | So |
| STAR | 20 | Kanye Clark | Jr |
| CB | 21 | CJ Hester | Fr |
| JACK | 22 | Kofi Asare | Sr |
| DL | 24 | Kamran James | Sr |
| CB | 25 | Cormani McClain | Jr |
| CB | 27 | Dijon Johnson | Jr |
| STAR | 28 | Elijah Owens | So |
| ILB | 29 | Jaden Robinson | Sr |
| STAR | 30 | Dylan Purter | Fr |
| ILB | 31 | Evan Jackson | So |
| S | 33 | DJ Coleman | Sr |
| S | 34 | Kaiden Hall | Fr |
| S | 35 | Brayden Slade | Jr |
| CB | 36 | Vincent Brown Jr. | Jr |
| CB | 37 | Javion Toombs | Sr |
| ILB | 42 | Matthew Kade | So |
| S | 43 | Alfonzo Allen Jr. | Sr |
| ILB | 44 | Myles Johnson | So |
| JACK | 48 | Erich Seager | Jr |
| DL | 49 | Jalen Wiggins | Fr |
| ILB | 50 | Malik Morris | Fr |
| ILB | 52 | Dylan Leighton | Fr |
| JACK | 55 | Charles Emanuel III | So |
| DL | 90 | Brendan Bett | Jr |
| DL | 91 | Jeramiah McCloud | So |
| DL | 92 | Sebastian Scott | Jr |
| DL | 93 | DK Kalu | Jr |
| DL | 94 | Kendall Guervil | Fr |
| DL | 95 | Jamari Lyons | Sr |
| DL | 96 | JaReylan McCoy | Fr |
| DL | 97 | Joseph Mbatchou | So |
| DL | 98 | Mason Clinton | Jr |
| DL | 99 | Emmanuel Oyebadejo | Sr |

Special teams

| Pos. | # | Name | Class |
|---|---|---|---|
| P | 38 | Alec Clark | Jr |
| LS | 39 | Carter Milliron | Sr |
| K | 40 | Brandon Rabasco | So |
| K | 41 | Liam Padron | So |
| P | 47 | Miller Fealy | So |
| P | 48 | Nicholas Inglis | So |
| LS | 58 | Hunter Solwold | Fr |
| K | 91 | Patrick Durkin | So |

Head coach

- Jon Sumrall

Coordinators/assistant coaches

- Buster Faulkner – Offensive coordinator
- Brad White – Defensive coordinator
- Gerald Chatman – Assistant head coach/defensive line
- Chris Collins – Safeties
- Joe Craddock – Quarterbacks
- Marcus Davis – Outside wide receivers
- Chris Foster – Running backs
- Johnathan Galante – Special teams coordinator
- Greg Gasparato – Linebackers
- Bam Hardmon – Outside linebackers
- Brandon Harris – Cornerbacks
- Evan McKissack – Tight ends
- Trent McKnight – Passing game coordinator/inside wide receivers
- Phil Trautwein – Offensive line
- Rusty Whitt – Director of strength & conditioning

Legend

- (C) Team captain
- (S) Suspended
- (I) Ineligible
- Injured
- Redshirt

Roster
Last update: June 21, 2026

== Coaching staff ==
Florida head coach Jon Sumrall will enter his first year as the Gators head coach for the 2026 season.

| Name | Position | Consecutive season at Florida in current position |
|---|---|---|
| Jon Sumrall | Head coach | 1st |
| Gerald Chatman | Assistant head coach / defensive line coach | 3rd |
| Buster Faulkner | Offensive coordinator | 1st |
| Brad White | Defensive coordinator | 1st |
| Johnathan Galante | Special teams coordinator | 1st |
| Joe Craddock | Quarterbacks coach | 1st |
| A.J. Erdely | Assistant quarterbacks coach | 1st |
| Chris Foster | Running backs coach | 1st |
| Marcus Davis | Wide receivers coach | 1st |
| Trent McKnight | Passing Game Coordinator/Inside Receivers Coach | 1st |
| Evan McKissack | Tight ends coach | 1st |
| Dylan Dockery | Assistant tight ends coach | 1st |
| Phil Trautwein | Offensive line coach | 1st |
| Mike Polly | Assistant offensive line coach | 1st |
| Byron Hardmon | Outside linebackers coach | 1st |
| Greg Gasparato | Inside linebackers coach | 1st |
| Brandon Harris | Cornerbacks coach | 1st |
| Chris Collins | Safeties coach | 1st |
| Emil Ekiyor Jr. | Offensive quality control | 1st |
| Ryland Goede | Offensive quality control | 1st |
| Rusty Whitt | Strength and conditioning coach | 1st |
