= Tramell Jones =

American football player (born 2006)

Tramell Jones Jr.
No. 9 – Florida Gators
- Position: Quarterback
- Class: Sophomore

Personal information
- Born: October 21, 2006 (age 20)
- Listed height: 6 ft 0 in (1.83 m)
- Listed weight: 203 lb (92 kg)

Career information
- High school: Mandarin (Jacksonville, Florida)
- College: Florida (2025–present)
- Stats at ESPN

Tramell Jones Jr. (born October 21, 2006) is an American college football quarterback for the Florida Gators.

== Early life ==
Jones attended and played football for Mandarin High School in Jacksonville, Florida. He was the only high school quarterback from Florida invited to participate in the 2024 Elite 11 Finals.

On April 1, 2023, Jones committed to play college football for the Florida State Seminoles. He chose FSU over offers from the Florida Gators, the Miami Hurricanes, and several other schools. On November 14, 2024, Jones decommitted from the Seminoles amid a disastrous 2024 season. On November 17, Jones announced his commitment to the Florida Gators. On December 4, 2024, Jones officially signed with the Gators.

Jones was considered a pro-style quarterback prospect.

College recruiting
Name	Hometown	School	Height	Weight	Commit date
Tramell Jones Jr. QB	Jacksonville, Florida	Mandarin	6 ft 0 in (1.83 m)	190 lb (86 kg)	Nov 17, 2024
Tramell Jones Jr. QB	Recruit ratings: Rivals: 247Sports: ESPN: (80)				

== College career ==
=== 2025: Freshman season ===
As a true freshman in 2025, his performance during fall camp and preseason scrimmages led to him securing the backup role behind starter DJ Lagway, ahead of competitors Aidan Warner and Harrison Bailey. Jones appeared in two games during the season, completing 21 of 35 passes for 191 yards and two touchdowns, with no interceptions noted in limited action. He made his collegiate debut in the second half of the season opener against Long Island University on August 30, 2025, where he completed 12 of 18 passes for 131 yards and two touchdowns, earning praise from head coach Billy Napier for his poise and accuracy as a pure passer. Jones later played the entire second half in a game at Kentucky, going 9 of 17 for 60 yards.

=== 2026: Sophomore season ===
During the 2026 offseason, there was a battle for the starting quarterback position between Jones and Aaron Philo with the latter ultimately winning the job. Jones was named the backup quarterback, playing mostly in blow outs against early season opponents. In week 7 with Philo injured, Jones got his first start in an away match against #7 ranked Texas. Florida ultimately won the game 27-24 with Jones throwing for 155 yards with 2 touchdowns.

=== College statistics ===
Season	Team	Games			Passing								Rushing			
Season	Team	GP	GS	Record	Cmp	Att	Pct	Yds	Y/A	TD	Int	Rtg	Att	Yds	Avg	TD
2025	Florida	2	0	—	21	35	60.0	191	5.5	2	0	124.7	8	10	1.3	0
2026	Florida	7	2	1–1	73	111	65.8	712	6.4	4	5	122.5	35	84	2.4	1
Career		9	2	1–1	94	146	64.4	903	6.2	6	5	123.0	43	94	2.2	1
