= Tampa Bay Technical High School =

Public high school in Tampa, Florida, United States

Location
- 6410 Orient Road; Tampa, Florida 33610

Information
- Type: Public magnet high school
- Established: 1969
- School district: Hillsborough County Public Schools
- Principal: Ernestine Woody-Bethune
- Teaching staff: 92.50 (FTE)
- Grades: 9–12
- Enrollment: 2,121 (2023–2024)
- Student to teacher ratio: 22.93
- Colors: Red, navy blue, white
- Mascot: Titan
- Nickname: Tech, TBT
- Team name: Titans
- Website: www.hillsboroughschools.org/o/tbt

Tampa Bay Technical High School (TBT) is a public comprehensive magnet high school for grades 9–12 in Florida, United States. It was established in 1969 as Tampa Bay Vocational Technical School. The school mascot is the Titan. Students apply for one of three programs: Tampa Bay Technical High School Programs, Academy of Architecture & Environmental Design, or Academy of Health Professions. The school campus resembles a community college campus with laboratory facilities for technology programs. Transportation is provided by the Hillsborough County Public Schools through a bus transfer system.

== Demographics ==
Tampa Bay Tech HS is 48.7% Black, 29.8% Hispanic, 13.4% White, 4.0% Asian, 3.9% multiracial, and .2% other

== Academics ==
In 2015–2016 Tampa Bay Technical High School had a graduation rate of 95%, and 75% of students were enrolled in Advanced Placement courses, with 41% passing. Dual enrollment courses are available through Hillsborough Community College.

The school offers the following programs:

=== Technology programs ===
- Auto Body Repair
- Automotive Repair
- Architecture
- Business Education
- Commercial Art Academy
- Computer Systems Technology
- Culinary Arts
- Diesel Technology
- Early Childhood Education
- Welding
- ROTC

=== Academy of Health ===
The Health program teaches Cardiology, Physical Therapy/Occupational Therapy, Veterinary Assistant, Medical Laboratory, Allied/ behavioral Health Nursing Assistant, Radiology, Dental Aid, and Radiology and EMS Training.

=== Academy of Architecture ===
The Academy of Architecture has classes in two separate rooms, each a fully functioning lab. The students learn fundamental skills about the architecture field and practice computer-aided design as well as manual drafting. Students enter contests throughout the year, including a local drafting and design competition at the Strawberry Festival, national drafting and design competitions with SkillsUSA, and the West Point Bridge Design Contest.

== Club involvement ==
Clubs are plentiful in the school and some nationwide clubs include chapters at Tampa Bay Tech. Clubs are divided into Career, Service, Interest and Honors Clubs.

=== Career clubs ===
- HOSA (Health Occupations Students of America)
- National FFA Organization (formerly known as Future Farmers of America)
- FBLA (Future Business Leaders of America)
- FSPA (The Florida Scholastic Press Association)
- FCCLA
- CAA (Commercial Arts Academy)

== Notable people ==
- Brian Blair - professional wrestler and local politician.
- Deon Cain - NFL and USFL wide receiver and member of 2016 Clemson Tigers football team championship team
- Alejandra Caraballo - civil rights attorney and clinical instructor at the Harvard Law School Cyberlaw Clinic.
- Maritza Correia - swimmer, silver medalist in the 2004 Olympic Games
- Maurice Crum Jr.- Notre Dame Linebacker (2004–2008) and Linebacker coach for Southern Methodist University
- Kevin Jermaine "Kay-Jay" Harris - Drafted by the Texas Rangers in the 10th round of the 1997 MLB June Amateur Draft. Played college football for the West Virginia Mountaineers followed by a short stint in the NFL with the Miami Dolphins, St. Louis Rams, and New York Giants.
- Kevin Hobbs - former NFL player
- Michael Penix Jr. - Atlanta Falcons quarterback, played for the Washington Huskies in 2022 and 2023 and 2023 Heisman finalist.
- Michelle Phan - makeup artist
- Paul Ray Smith - Iraq war hero and Medal of Honor recipient
- Ted Washington - retired National Football League player
- Dallas Wilson - college football wide receiver for the Florida Gators
