= Mandarin High School =

Public high school in Jacksonville, Florida, United States

Location
- 4831 Greenland Road; Jacksonville, Florida 32258; United States; 30.162835°N 81.584575°W

Information
- Other name: MHS
- Type: Public high school
- Motto: Excellence Is Not A Skill. It's An Attitude!
- Established: 1990
- School district: Duval County Public Schools
- NCES School ID: 120048002744
- Principal: Sara Bravo
- Teaching staff: 111.00 (on an FTE basis)
- Grades: 9–12
- Enrollment: 2,398 (2023–2024)
- Student to teacher ratio: 21.60
- Colors: Orange and green
- Mascot: Mustang
- Nickname: Mustangs
- Newspaper: The Mandarin Times
- Yearbook: Exemplar
- Website: dcps.duvalschools.org/mhs

Mandarin High School (MHS) is a public high school in Jacksonville, Florida, United States. It was established in 1990 and is part of the Duval County Public Schools district. As of 2010, it is the second-largest high school in Duval County following Sandalwood High School. Atlantic Coast High School opened in 2010 to prevent overcrowding at the school, as well as Sandalwood, Englewood and Wolfson. Several NFL players went to Mandarin.

== Academics ==
Mandarin High School offers the Advanced International Certificate of Education (AICE) program along with Advanced Placement courses. It provides a Medical Academy certified by the state of Florida and as of 2012, it offers Advancement Via Individual Determination (AVID) to incoming freshmen. It also offers the dual enrollment program in partnership with the Florida State College at Jacksonville (FSCJ).

== Athletics ==
During the fall, girls' bowling, boys' 11-man tackle football, boys' and girls' cross country, boys' and girls' swimming, boys' and girls' golf, girls' slow pitch softball, and girls' volleyball are offered. During the winter season, it offers co-ed wrestling, boys' and girls' basketball, girls' weightlifting, and boys' and girls' soccer. Spring sports include girls' fast pitch softball, boys' baseball, boys' and girls' lacrosse, boys' and girls' tennis, and girls' flag football. The only summer season sport appears to be its marching band program which is open to boys and girls. The season starts in the summer and carries into the fall.

The school has an outdoor pool which is used by the athletic teams and for those in physical education classes during the academic year. It is available for public use as a neighborhood pool, operated by the City of Jacksonville Parks & Recreation Department, during the summer months.

== Incidents ==
=== Vehicle and body found in lake ===
On November 24, 2010, a car was reported submerged in the school's front exterior pond. The Jacksonville Sheriffs Office responded with a dive-team and, upon pulling the vehicle from the lake, discovered human remains inside. The car belonged to a man who was reported missing four years earlier.

=== Football stadium fire ===
On March 3, 2011, a shed containing lawn and football equipment was set on fire near the football stadium. The fire caused over $50,000 in damages and resulted in two students being charged with arson.

== Notable alumni ==
- Carson Beck (2020), NFL quarterback for Arizona Cardinals ,
- Tony Carter (2004), former NFL cornerback, Central State Football head coach
- Jeff Chandler (1996), former NFL placekicker
- Sam Cowart (1993), former NFL linebacker
- DeMario Douglas (2019), NFL wide receiver for the New England Patriots
- Jaime Ffrench Jr. (2025), wide receiver for Michigan Wolverines
- Eduardo Garcia, Olympic runner
- Charles James (2009), former NFL cornerback
- Terrell Jennings (2019), NFL running back for the New England Patriots
- Tramell Jones Jr. (2025), quarterback for Florida Gators
- Kensey McMahon (2018), competitive swimmer
- Kris Mitchell (2019), former wide receiver for Notre Dame Fighting Irish
- Michelle Moultrie (2008), professional softball player
- Fred Weary (1993), former NFL defensive back
