= Jayden Woods =

American football player

No. 0 – Florida Gators
- Position: Defensive end
- Class: Sophomore

Personal information
- Listed height: 6 ft 3 in (1.91 m)
- Listed weight: 248 lb (112 kg)

Career information
- High school: Mill Valley (Shawnee, Kansas)
- College: Florida (2025–present)
- Stats at ESPN

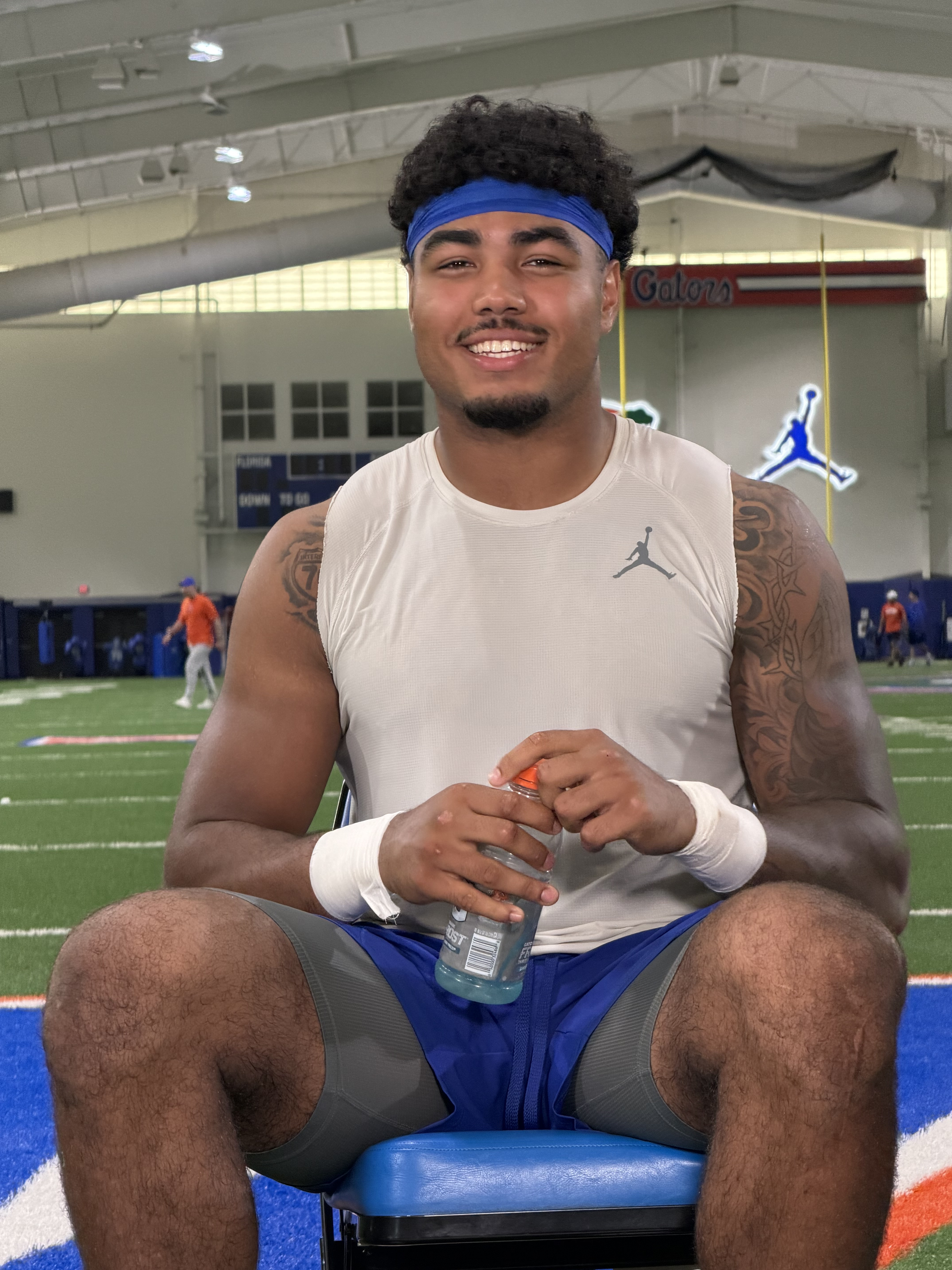
Jayden Woods ahead of the 2026 Florida Gators football season

Jayden Woods is an American college football defensive end for the Florida Gators.

== Early life ==
Woods attended Mill Valley High School in Shawnee, Kansas. During his high school career he had 212 tackles, 18.5 sacks and one interception. A top 100-recruit, he originally committed to play college football at Penn State University before flipping to the University of Florida.

Woods' father Justin also starred at Mill Valley and played college football at Kansas State, Fort Scott Community College, and Pittsburg State as a running back and defensive back.

== College career ==
Woods earned playing time during his true freshman year at Florida in 2025, eventually taking over as a starter.

On December 29, 2025, Woods announced that he would enter the transfer portal. However, he would withdraw from the transfer portal on January 7, 2026.
