= Vernell Brown III =

American football player (born 2006)

No. 1 – Florida Gators
- Position: Wide receiver
- Class: Sophomore

Personal information
- Born: December 16, 2006 (age 19)
- Listed height: 5 ft 11 in (1.80 m)
- Listed weight: 178 lb (81 kg)

Career information
- High school: Jones (Orlando, Florida)
- College: Florida (2025–present)
- Stats at ESPN

Vernell Brown III (born December 16, 2006) is an American college football wide receiver for the Florida Gators.

== Early life ==
Brown III attended Jones High School in Orlando, Florida. As a senior, he had 94 receptions for 1,508 yards and 11 touchdowns. For his career he had 143 receptions for 2,488 yards and 18 touchdowns. Brown III played in the 2025 Under Armour All-America Game. A five-star recruit, he committed to the University of Florida to play college football.

== College career ==
In his first game at Florida his true freshman year in 2025, Brown III became the third receiver in school history to start the season opener after Percy Harvin and Antonio Callaway. He finished the game with three receptions for a school freshman record 79 yards.

=== College statistics ===
Year	Team	Games		Receiving				Rushing			Kick returns			Punt returns		
Year	Team	GP	GS	Rec	Yds	Avg	TD	Att	Yds	TD	Ret	Yds	TD	Ret	Yds	TD
2025	Florida	10	6	40	512	12.8	0	1	14	0	7	122	0	13	140	0
2026	Florida	4	4	17	271	15.9	2	3	16	0	0	0	0	5	173	2
Career		14	10	57	783	13.7	2	4	30	0	7	122	0	18	313	2

== Personal life ==
Both his father and grandfather also played college football at Florida.
