= Robert Bala =

American football coach

Current position
- Title: Defensive coordinator
- Team: James Madison
- Conference: Sun Belt

Biographical details
- Education: Southern Utah University (2008)

Playing career
- 2004–2005: Palomar
- 2006–2007: Southern Utah
- Position: Linebacker

Coaching career (HC unless noted)
- 2009–2010: Snow (LB)
- 2011–2013: Palomar (DC)
- 2014: Oakland Raiders (intern)
- 2015–2016: Palomar (DC)
- 2017: OUAZ (ST)
- 2018–2021: Southern Utah (DC/LB/CB)
- 2022: Liberty (analyst)
- 2023: Alabama (LB)
- 2024: Washington (ILB)
- 2025: Florida (co-DC/ILB)
- 2026–present: James Madison (DC)

Robert Bala is an American college football coach. He is the defensive coordinator for the James Madison Dukes.

== Coaching career ==
Bala got his first coaching job in 2009 as the linebackers coach for Snow College. In 2011, he was hired by Palomar College as the team's defensive coordinator. In 2014, he joined the Oakland Raiders as a linebackers coach and special teams intern; after one season, he returned to Palomar. In 2017, Bala was hired by Ottawa University in Arizona as the team's special teams coordinator. In 2018, he was hired by his alma mater Southern Utah as the team's cornerbacks coach. Over the next few years, he was promoted in 2019 to coach the team's cornerbacks and be the co-special team's coordinator, and in 2020 he was promoted to safeties coach and defensive coordinator. In 2021 he became the team's linebackers coach and defensive coordinator. In 2022, Bala was hired by the Liberty Flames as a defensive analyst. For the 2023 season, he joined the Alabama Crimson Tide to coach the team's linebackers. After the conclusion of the 2023 season, Bala was not retained under new head coach Kalen DeBoer.
