= Duke Clark =

American football player

No. 20 – Florida Gators
- Position: Running back
- Class: Sophomore

Personal information
- Listed height: 6 ft 2 in (1.88 m)
- Listed weight: 208 lb (94 kg)

Career information
- High school: Plant (Tampa, Florida)
- College: Florida (2025–present)
- Stats at ESPN

Waltez Clark is an American college football running back for the Florida Gators.

== Early life ==
Clark attended Henry B. Plant High School in Tampa, Florida. During his high school career he had 1,735 rushing yards with 38 touchdowns and 73 receptions for 1,300 yards and 16 touchdowns. He committed to the University of Florida to play college football.

== College career ==
Clark played in four games as a freshman at Florida in 2025, rushing 15 times for 58 yards. He entered his sophomore season in 2026 as the backup to Jadan Baugh. He rushed for his first career 100-yard game against the Ole Miss Rebels, rushing 12 times for 126 yards and a touchdown.
