= Buster Faulkner =

American football coach (born 1981)

Current position
- Title: Offensive coordinator
- Team: Florida
- Conference: SEC

Biographical details
- Born: September 19, 1981 (age 45); Lilburn, Georgia, U.S.

Playing career
- 2000–2003: Valdosta State
- 2004: Texas A&M–Commerce
- Position: Quarterback

Coaching career (HC unless noted)
- 2005: Valdosta State (SA)
- 2006: Georgia (GA)
- 2007: Valdosta State (QB)
- 2008: Valdosta State (OC/QB)
- 2009: Central Arkansas (QB)
- 2010: Murray State (OC/QB)
- 2011–2015: Middle Tennessee State (OC/QB)
- 2016: Arkansas State (OC)
- 2017–2018: Arkansas State (OC/TE)
- 2019: Southern Miss (OC/QB)
- 2020–2022: Georgia (QC/QB)
- 2023–2025: Georgia Tech (OC/TE)
- 2026–present: Florida (OC)

Buster Faulkner (born September 19, 1981) is an American football coach and former player who is the offensive coordinator for the University of Florida. He previously served as the offensive coordinator for Georgia Tech. He attended Parkview High School in Lilburn, GA and played quarterback.

== College career ==
Faulkner played three years at Valdosta State, passing for 7,100 yards and 64 touchdowns while helping the team achieve a 47–6 record. His best year for Valdosta State came during his sophomore year where he completed 327 of 503 passes for 3,941 yards and 44 touchdowns. He helped lead the Blazers to a 14–1 record and an appearance in the national championship game. Faulkner transferred to Texas A&M-Commerce for his senior year. In his lone season with Texas A&M-Commerce, he passed for 2,861 and 16 touchdowns, setting 10 school records.

== Coaching career ==
Faulkner started his coaching career in 2005 as a student assistant for Valdosta State. After one year at Valdosta State, Faulkner became a graduate assistant at Georgia for the 2006 season. Faulkner then returned to Valdosta State as their quarterbacks coach for one season, after which he was promoted to be their offensive coordinator. Faulkner then moved on to Central Arkansas for the 2009 season as the team's quarterbacks coach. Faulkner was then hired as the offensive coordinator and quarterback coach for the Murray State Racers. In 2011 Faulkner was hired by Middle Tennessee as their quarterbacks coach. However mid-way through the 2011 season offensive coordinator Willie Simmons was charged with aggravated assault and resigned from his job, resulting in Faulkner being promoted to offensive coordinator. After four seasons with Middle Tennessee State, Faulkner moved to Arkansas State as their offensive coordinator. After three years with Arkansas State, Faulkner became the offensive coordinator and quarterbacks coach at Southern Miss. After one season with Southern Miss, Faulkner left for Georgia to be an offensive quality control coach for them. In his three years with Georgia he won two national championships. Faulkner would then be hired by Georgia Tech as their offensive coordinator and tight ends coach.
