= Dallas Wilson =

American football player

No. 6 – Florida Gators
- Position: Wide receiver
- Class: Redshirt Freshman

Personal information
- Listed height: 6 ft 3 in (1.91 m)
- Listed weight: 218 lb (99 kg)

Career information
- High school: Tampa Bay Technical (Tampa, Florida)
- College: Florida (2025–present)
- Stats at ESPN

Dallas Wilson is an American college football wide receiver for the Florida Gators.

== Early life ==
Wilson attended Tampa Bay Technical High School. In his first three seasons, he recorded 130 receptions for 2,423 yards and 28 touchdowns. Wilson was rated as a five-star recruit, the eighth best wide receiver, and the 50th overall player in the class of 2025. He initially committed to play college football for the Oregon Ducks over other offers from schools such as Alabama, Georgia, Tennessee, Florida State, and Indiana. However, he later flipped his commitment and signed to play with the Florida Gators.

== College career ==
In Florida's 2025 spring game, Wilson hauled in ten receptions for 195 yards and two touchdowns. In his first game as a Gator he set school records for receptions, yards, and touchdowns by a freshman in their first game.

=== College statistics ===
Year	Team	Games		Receiving				Rushing		
Year	Team	GP	GS	Rec	Yds	Avg	TD	Att	Yds	TD
2025	Florida	4	4	12	174	14.5	3	0	0	0
2026	Florida	4	4	14	236	16.9	2	1	6	1
Career		8	8	26	410	15.8	5	1	6	1
