= Ben Hanks III =

American football player

No. 12 – Florida Gators
- Position: Cornerback
- Class: Sophomore

Personal information
- Listed height: 6 ft 1 in (1.85 m)
- Listed weight: 186 lb (84 kg)

Career information
- High school: Booker T. Washington (Miami, Florida)
- College: Florida (2025–present)
- Stats at ESPN

Ben Hanks III is an American college football cornerback for the Florida Gators.

== Early life ==
Hanks III attended Booker T. Washington Senior High School in Miami, Florida. As a senior, he was the Dade 3A-1A Defensive Player of the Year after recording a Miami-Dade County single-season record 13 interceptions. For his career he had 106 tackles and 21 interceptions. Rated as a five-star recruit by On3.com, Hanks III was selected to play in the 2025 Navy All-American Bowl. He committed to the University of Florida to play college football.

== College career ==
In his first year at Florida in 2025, Hanks III played in three games and made one start, recording eight tackles and one interception which came in his first start. He returned to Florida as a starter his second year in 2026.

== Personal life ==
His father, Ben Hanks, played linebacker at Florida and in the National Football League (NFL).
