= Fletcher Westphal =

American football player (born 2005)

No. 68 – Florida Gators
- Position: Offensive tackle
- Class: Redshirt Freshman

Personal information
- Listed height: 6 ft 8 in (2.03 m)
- Listed weight: 342 lb (155 kg)

Career information
- High school: Tuscarora (Leesburg, Virginia)
- College: Florida (2024–present)

Awards and highlights
- Virginia Football Player of the Year (2024)

Fletcher Westphal is an American college football offensive tackle. He plays college football at the University of Florida.

== Career ==
Westphal attended Tuscarora High School in Leesburg, Virginia. After his senior season, he was named the 2024 Virginia Football Player of the Year by the DC Touchdown Club. Westphal committed to the University of Florida to play college football as an early enrollee in January 2024.

Westphal was also named The Washington Post All Met Player of the Year for the 2023 and 2022 seasons.

Westphal was invited to play in the All-American Bowl (high school football)
