= Aaron Philo =

American football player

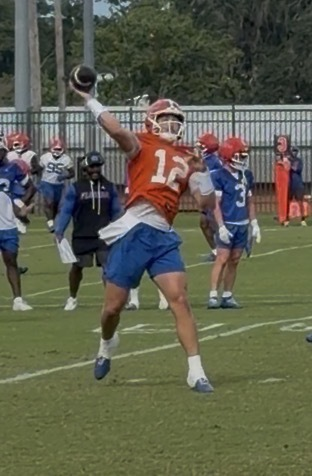
- Philo in 2026

No. 12 – Florida Gators
- Position: Quarterback
- Class: (redshirt) Sophomore

Personal information
- Listed height: 6 ft 1 in (1.85 m)
- Listed weight: 208 lb (94 kg)

Career information
- High school: Prince Avenue Christian (Bogart, Georgia)
- College: Georgia Tech (2024–2025); Florida (2026–present)
- Stats at ESPN

Aaron Philo (PHY-low) is an American college football quarterback for the Florida Gators. He previously played for the Georgia Tech Yellow Jackets.

== Early life ==
Philo attended Prince Avenue Christian School in Bogart, Georgia. In 2023, Philo broke the Georgia state record for passing yards, which was previously held by Trevor Lawrence, finishing his high school career with 13,922 passing yards. As a senior, he threw for 4,596 yards and a single-season state-record 56 touchdowns. A three-star recruit, Philo decommitted from Minnesota, and flipped his commitment to play college football at the Georgia Institute of Technology.

== College career ==
=== Georgia Tech ===
Philo made his collegiate debut against VMI, throwing for 49 yards on three completions. Against Virginia Tech, he threw for 184 yards and an interception in relief of Zach Pyron. Against Miami, Philo threw for 67 yards and a touchdown, the first of his career, helping lead the Yellow Jackets to a 28–23 upset victory. Against NC State, he threw for 265 yards while rushing for an additional 57 yards and the game-winning touchdown, an 18-yard touchdown run, in a 30–29 victory. For his performance, he was named the ACC rookie of the week.

=== Florida ===
On January 6, 2026, Philo announced his decision to transfer to the University of Florida to play for the Florida Gators. Entering the 2026 season, he was named Florida's starting quarterback.

=== College statistics ===
Season	Team	Games			Passing								Rushing			
Season	Team	GP	GS	Record	Cmp	Att	Pct	Yds	Y/A	TD	Int	Rtg	Att	Yds	Avg	TD
2024	Georgia Tech	5	0	—	38	74	51.4	565	7.6	1	2	114.5	12	76	6.3	1
2025	Georgia Tech	3	1	1–0	21	28	75.0	373	13.3	1	1	191.5	4	19	4.8	0
2026	Florida	8	8	5–3	126	180	70.0	1,486	8.3	9	5	150.6	59	206	3.5	3
Career		16	9	6−3	185	282	65.6	2,424	8.6	11	8	145.0	75	301	4.0	5
