= Jadan Baugh =

American football player

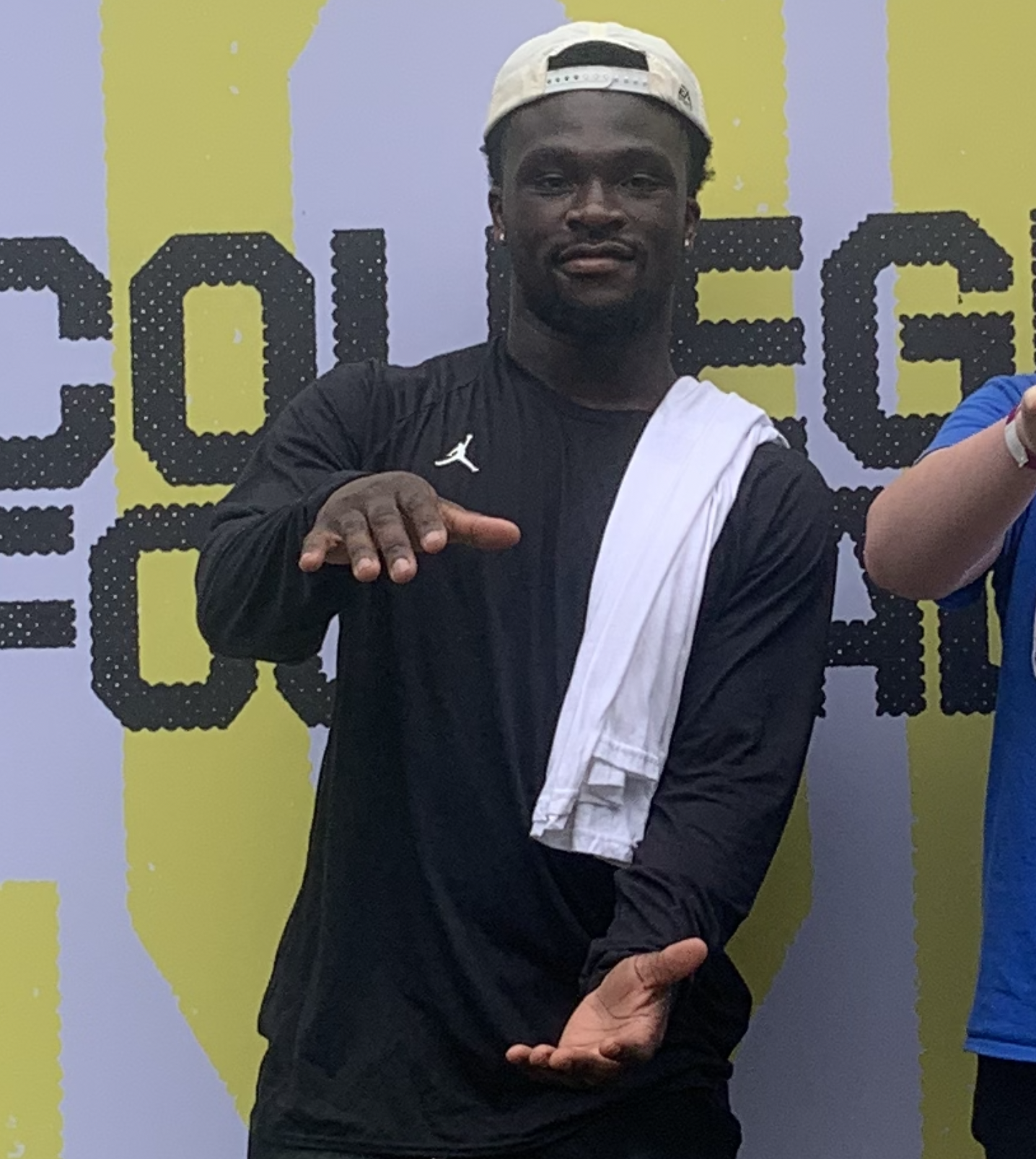
- Baugh in 2025

No. 13 – Florida Gators
- Position: Running back
- Class: Junior

Personal information
- Listed height: 6 ft 1 in (1.85 m)
- Listed weight: 227 lb (103 kg)

Career information
- High school: Columbia (Decatur, Georgia)
- College: Florida (2024–present)

Awards and highlights
- Second-team All-SEC (2025)
- Stats at ESPN

Jadan Baugh is an American college football running back for the Florida Gators.

== Early life ==
Baugh attended Columbia High School in Decatur, Georgia. As a junior, he rushed for 306 yards and three touchdowns, before committing to Arkansas. As a senior, he rushed 113 times for 1,583 yards and 18 touchdowns, while also hauling in 28 receptions for 508 yards and 7 touchdowns, before decommiting from Arkansas. After reopening his recruitment, Baugh committed to play college football at the University of Florida.

== College career ==
=== 2024: Freshman season ===
Baugh started the season as the third-string running back behind Montrell Johnson Jr. and Treyaun Webb. However, after injuries to both players, Baugh took on his most significant role yet in a game against Tennessee, rushing for 25 yards on 12 carries. In his first career start on Week 7 against Kentucky, he rushed for 106 yards and a school-record five touchdowns, leading the Gators to a 48–20 victory. As a result of his performance, he was named the SEC Freshman of the Week. He was the starting running back in losses to Georgia and Texas (recording a touchdown in the latter) before sharing starting duties with Johnson after his return from injury. Against LSU, Baugh had a game-sealing 55-yard touchdown run in the dying minutes to guarantee a 27-16 win for the Gators.

=== 2025: Sophomore season ===
Going into the 2025 season, Baugh was the starting running back for Florida, although Ja'Kobi Jackson retained some carries. Baugh began the season against Long Island University, rushing for 104 yards and a touchdown on 9 carries. Baugh was rested during the latter part of the 55-0 blowout win. In the following game against USF, Baugh rushed for 93 yards on 18 carries as the Gators were upset 18-16 at home. The Gators then traveled to Tiger Stadium for their rivalry matchup against LSU. Baugh scored an 87-yard touchdown during the game that was immediately overturned due to a holding penalty. The Gators went on to lose the game 20-10.

Baugh scored the only Florida touchdown in an away matchup against rival Miami, with the Gators faltering 26-7. In the following home matchup against Texas, Jackson was injured. With the lion's share of the work, Baugh gained 107 yards on 27 carries and the opening touchdown. Florida completed the home upset in a 29-21 win. In the final game of the season versus rival FSU, Baugh rushed for 266 yards on 38 attempts and two touchdowns as Florida secured the win 40-21. Baugh's 266 rushing yards is the second-most single-game rushing total in the history of Florida's football program, behind only Emmitt Smith's 316 rushing yards versus New Mexico in 1989.

=== 2026: Junior season ===
As the starting running back under new head coach Jon Sumrall, Baugh came into the season as one of the top running backs in the SEC. Baugh started off strong against FAU rushing for 160 yards and 3 touchdowns on 14 carries. During the week 3 matchup, Baugh rushed for 162 yards and 3 touchdowns on 26 carriers and a single reception for 6 yards aiding in the 44-39 win over Auburn. The following week against Ole Miss, Baugh scored three touchdowns on 142 rushing yards in the 52–28 home upset against the #4 ranked Rebels.

=== Statistics ===
College statistics
Season	Team	Games	Rushing				Receiving			
Season	Team	GP	Att	Yards	Avg	TD	Rec	Yards	Avg	TD
2024	Florida	13	133	673	5.1	7	4	33	8.3	1
2025	Florida	12	220	1,170	5.3	8	33	210	6.4	2
2026	Florida	11	197	981	4.98	16	12	74	6.2	0
Career		35	550	2824	5.1	31	49	315	6.6	3
