= 2026 Monmouth Hawks football team =

American college football season

2026 Monmouth Hawks football
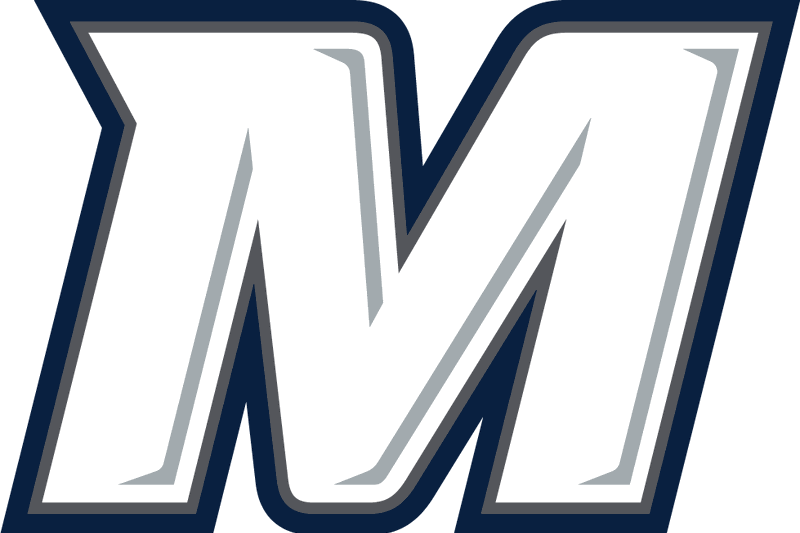

CAA champion

FCS Playoffs
- Conference: CAA Football

Ranking
- STATS: No. 18
- FCS Coaches: No. 20
- Record: 9–3 (8–0 CAA)
- Head coach: Jeff Gallo (1st season)
- Offensive coordinator: Jimmy Robertson (1st season)
- Home stadium: Kessler Stadium

2026 Coastal Athletic Association Football Conference standings
	Conf.			Overall
Team	W		L	W		L
No. 18 Monmouth $^	8	–	0	9	–	3
Bryant	6	–	2	8	–	4
Albany	6	–	2	8	–	4
No. 22 Campbell	5	–	3	8	–	4
North Carolina A&T	4	–	4	5	–	7
Towson	4	–	4	4	–	8
Sacred Heart	4	–	4	5	–	6
New Hampshire	4	–	4	5	–	7
Stony Brook	4	–	4	6	–	6
Elon	4	–	4	6	–	6
Rhode Island	2	–	6	5	–	7
Maine	1	–	7	1	–	10
Hampton	0	–	8	1	–	11
$ – Conference champion; ^ – FCS playoff participant; As of November 22, 2026; Rankings from STATS Poll

The 2026 Monmouth Hawks football team will represent Monmouth University as a member of the Coastal Athletic Association Football Conference (CAA Football) during the 2026 NCAA Division I FCS football season. The Hawks will be led by first-year head coach Jeff Gallo and will play their home games at Kessler Stadium in West Long Branch, New Jersey.

== Schedule ==
Date	Time	Opponent	Rank	Site	TV	Result	Attendance
August 29	7:00 p.m.	at No. 14 Tennessee Tech*	No. 22	Tucker Stadium; Cookeville, TN	ESPN+	L 14–38	4,800
September 5	2:00 p.m.	Sacred Heart		Kessler Stadium; West Long Branch, NJ	FloFootball	W 31–24	3,622
September 12	6:30 p.m.	at Western Michigan*		Waldo Stadium; Kalamazoo, MI	ESPN+	L 14–49	24,605
September 19	3:30 p.m.	at Albany		Bob Ford Field; Albany, NY	FloFootball	W 28–20	6,132
September 26	1:00 p.m.	at Dartmouth*		Memorial Field; Hanover, NH	ESPN+	W 31–28	4,417
October 3	1:00 p.m.	Towson^{†}		Kessler Stadium; West Long Branch, NJ	FloFootball	W 41–40	3,894
October 17	1:00 p.m.	at New Hampshire	No. 23	Wildcat Stadium; Durham, NH	FloFootball	W 42–21	8,693
October 24	2:00 p.m.	at Hampton	No. 19	Armstrong Stadium; Hampton, VA	FloFootball	W 49–13	7,992
October 31	12:00 p.m.	Bryant	No. 18	Kessler Stadium; West Long Branch, NJ	FloFootball	W 34–21	3,642
November 7	12:00 p.m.	North Carolina A&T	No. 15	Kessler Stadium; West Long Branch, NJ	FloFootball	W 21–17	2,763
November 14	12:00 p.m.	Merrimack*	No. 14	Kessler Stadium; West Long Branch, NJ	FloFootball	L 28–29	2,464
November 21	1:00 p.m.	at No. 22 Campbell	No. 18	Barker–Lane Stadium; Buies Creek, NC	FloFootball	W 55–49	4,588
*Non-conference game; ^{†}Homecoming; Rankings from STATS Poll released prior to the game; All times are in Eastern time

== Game summaries ==
=== at No. 14 Tennessee Tech ===
No. 22 Monmouth Hawks (0–0) at No. 14 Tennessee Tech Golden Eagles (0–0) – Game summary

Quarter	1	2	3	4	Total
No. 22 Hawks	0	7	0	7	14
No. 14 Golden Eagles	7	10	7	14	38

at Tucker Stadium • Cookeville, Tennessee

- Date: August 29
- Game time: 7:00 p.m.
- Game weather: Sunny • Temperature: 89 °F (32 °C) • Wind: SE at 2 miles per hour (3.2 km/h)
- Game attendance: 4,800
- Referee: Todd Boyd
- TV announcers (ESPN+): Dylan Vazzano and Sam Brooks

Game information

First quarter

- TNTC – Gabe Nunez 2-yard pass from Jax Leatherwood (Carter Brown kick), 9:56. Golden Eagles 7–0. Drive: 9 plays, 38 yards, 3:34.

Second quarter

- MONM – Elijah Jennings 11-yard run (Sky Sholder kick), 4:45. Tied 7–7. Drive: 6 plays, 69 yards, 1:24.
- TNTC – Qua Ashley 18-yard pass from Jax Leatherwood (Carter Brown kick), 1:00. Golden Eagles 14–7. Drive: 4 plays, 32 yards, 0:51.
- TNTC – Carter Brown 40-yard field goal, 0:00. Golden Eagles 17–7. Drive: 4 plays, 18 yards, 0:18.

Third quarter

- TNTC – M.J. Flowers 6-yard run (Carter Brown kick), 12:41. Golden Eagles 24–7. Drive: 5 plays, 75 yards, 2:19.

Fourth quarter

- TNTC – Maury Sullivan 16-yard pass from Jax Leatherwood (Carter Brown kick), 12:01. Golden Eagles 31–7. Drive: 4 plays, 41 yards, 1:55.
- TNTC – Qua Ashley 23-yard pass from Jax Leatherwood (Carter Brown kick), 4:53. Golden Eagles 38–7. Drive: 9 plays, 61 yards, 5:46.
- MONM – Kenny Smith 1-yard run (Sky Sholder kick), 1:50. Golden Eagles 38–14. Drive: 12 plays, 76 yards, 2:58.

Statistics	MONM	TNTC
First downs	21	24
Plays–yards	65–304	73–395
Rushes–yards	24–125	37–106
Passing yards	179	289
Passing: comp–att–int	20–41–1	24–36–0
Turnovers	2	1
Time of possession	22:05	37:55

Team	Category	Player	Statistics
Monmouth	Passing	Frankie Weaver	20/41, 179 yards, INT
Monmouth	Rushing	Elijah Jennings	12 carries, 78 yards, TD
Monmouth	Receiving	Greg Genross	4 receptions, 39 yards
Tennessee Tech	Passing	Jax Leatherwood	24/35, 289 yards, 4 TD
Tennessee Tech	Rushing	M.J. Flowers	15 carries, 58 yards, TD
Tennessee Tech	Receiving	Gabe Nunez	6 receptions, 118 yards, TD

=== Sacred Heart ===
Sacred Heart Pioneers (0–0) at Monmouth Hawks (0–1) – Game summary

Quarter	1	2	3	4	Total
Pioneers	7	7	7	3	24
Hawks	7	7	7	10	31

at Kessler Stadium • West Long Branch, New Jersey

- Date: September 5
- Game time: 2:00 p.m.
- Game weather: Sunny • Temperature: 78 °F (26 °C) • Wind: N at 8 miles per hour (13 km/h)
- Game attendance: 3,622
- Referee: Alex Parrella
- TV: FloSports

Game information

First quarter

- MONM – Kenny Smith Jr. 7-yard run (Sky Sholder kick), 7:58. Hawks 7–0. Drive: 8 plays, 58 yards, 3:12.
- SHU – Jason Palmieri 6-yard pass from Poochie Snyder (Ryan Bocklet kick), 5:07. Tied 7–7. Drive: 7 plays, 74 yards, 2:45.

Second quarter

- SHU – Dean Hangey 9-yard pass from Poochie Snyder (Ryan Bocklet kick), 13:37. Pioneers 14–7. Drive: 9 plays, 65 yards, 5:08.
- MONM – Gavin Nelson 19-yard pass from Frankie Weaver (Sky Sholder kick), 0:22. Tied 14–14. Drive: 11 plays, 85 yards, 3:17.

Third quarter

- MONM – Elijah Jennings 10-yard pass from Frankie Weaver (Sky Sholder kick), 11:31. Hawks 21–14. Drive: 8 plays, 65 yards, 3:29.
- SHU – Dean Hangey 52-yard pass from Poochie Snyder (Ryan Bocklet kick), 3:02. Tied 21–21. Drive: 4 plays, 64 yards, 1:51.

Fourth quarter

- MONM – Sky Sholder 25-yard field goal, 13:46. Hawks 24–21. Drive: 13 plays, 79 yards, 4:08.
- SHU – Ryan Bocklet 23-yard field goal, 8:08. Tied 24–24. Drive: 11 plays, 66 yards, 5:33.
- MONM – Kenny Smith Jr. 7-yard pass from Frankie Weaver (Sky Sholder kick), 2:54. Hawks 31–24. Drive: 11 plays, 68 yards, 5:07.

Statistics	SHU	MONM
First downs	26	23
Plays–yards	71–408	63–350
Rushes–yards	46–217	26–113
Passing yards	191	237
Passing: comp–att–int	14–25–0	26–37–0
Turnovers	0	0
Time of possession	35:26	24:34

Team	Category	Player	Statistics
Sacred Heart	Passing	Poochie Snyder	14/25, 191 yards, 3 TD
Sacred Heart	Rushing	Chuck Webb	18 carries, 72 yards
Sacred Heart	Receiving	Dean Hangey	5 receptions, 110 yards, 2 TD
Monmouth	Passing	Frankie Weaver	26/37, 237 yards, 3 TD
Monmouth	Rushing	Elijah Jennings	11 carries, 52 yards
Monmouth	Receiving	Gavin Nelson	8 receptions, 89 yards, TD

=== at Western Michigan (FBS) ===
Monmouth Hawks (1–1) at Western Michigan Broncos (FBS) (0–1) – Game summary

Quarter	1	2	3	4	Total
Hawks	0	0	7	7	14
Broncos (FBS)	7	14	21	7	49

at Waldo Stadium • Kalamazoo, Michigan

- Date: September 12
- Game time: 6:30 p.m.
- Game weather: Clear • Temperature: 82 °F (28 °C) • Wind: NW at 8 miles per hour (13 km/h)
- Game attendance: 24,605
- Referee: Jason Perkins
- TV announcers (ESPN+): Evan Stockton and Marcus Ray

Game information

First quarter

- WMU – Baylin Brooks 13-yard pass from Broc Lowry (Dieter Kelly kick), 4:36. Broncos 7–0. Drive: 8 plays, 56 yards, 4:50.

Second quarter

- WMU – Egypt Nelson 23-yard pass from Broc Lowry (Dieter Kelly kick), 10:53. Broncos 14–0. Drive: 7 plays, 70 yards, 3:34.
- WMU – Jalen Buckley 1-yard run (Dieter Kelly kick), 4:47. Broncos 21–0. Drive: 2 plays, 5 yards, 0:32.

Third quarter

- WMU – Jalen Buckley 11-yard run (Dieter Kelly kick), 14:03. Broncos 28–0. Drive: 3 plays, 68 yards, 0:57.
- MONM – Tra Neal 5-yard pass from Frankie Weaver (Sky Sholder kick), 11:20. Broncos 28–7. Drive: 7 plays, 75 yards, 2:43.
- WMU – Baylin Brooks 12-yard pass from Broc Lowry (Dieter Kelly kick), 9:10. Broncos 35–7. Drive: 4 plays, 74 yards, 2:05.
- WMU – Jalen Buckley 1-yard run (Dieter Kelly kick), 3:55. Broncos 42–7. Drive: 4 plays, 43 yards, 2:10.

Fourth quarter

- WMU – Ryan Brotherton 21-yard pass from Trey Petty (Dieter Kelly kick), 4:11. Broncos 49–7. Drive: 14 plays, 86 yards, 7:52.
- MONM – Nazir Treadwell 1-yard run (Sky Sholder kick), 0:15. Broncos 49–14. Drive: 12 plays, 75 yards, 3:56.

Statistics	MONM	WMU
First downs	27	24
Plays–yards	90–431	57–414
Rushes–yards	44–158	32–148
Passing yards	273	266
Passing: comp–att–int	28–46–0	18–25–0
Turnovers	2	0
Time of possession	31:52	28:08

Team	Category	Player	Statistics
Monmouth	Passing	Frankie Weaver	28/46, 273 yards, TD
Monmouth	Rushing	Elijah Jennings	19 carries, 87 yards
Monmouth	Receiving	Tra Neal	7 receptions, 106 yards, TD
Western Michigan	Passing	Broc Lowry	14/20, 212 yards, 3 TD
Western Michigan	Rushing	Broc Lowry	4 carries, 40 yards
Western Michigan	Receiving	Aveion Chenault	4 receptions, 101 yards

=== at Albany ===
Monmouth Hawks (1–2) at Albany Great Danes (2–1) – Game summary

Quarter	1	2	3	4	Total
Hawks	0	0	0	0	0
Great Danes	0	0	0	0	0

at Tom & Mary Casey Stadium • Albany, New York

- Date: September 19
- Game time: 3:30 p.m.

Game information

First quarter
Second quarter
Third quarter
Fourth quarter

Statistics	MONM	ALB
First downs		
Plays–yards		
Rushes–yards		
Passing yards		
Passing: comp–att–int		
Turnovers		
Time of possession		

Team	Category	Player	Statistics
Monmouth	Passing		
Monmouth	Rushing		
Monmouth	Receiving		
Albany	Passing		
Albany	Rushing		
Albany	Receiving		

=== at Dartmouth ===
Monmouth Hawks (2–2) at Dartmouth Big Green (0–1) – Game summary

Quarter	1	2	3	4	Total
Hawks	0	0	0	0	0
Big Green	0	0	0	0	0

at Memorial Stadium • Hanover, New Hampshire

- Date: September 26
- Game time: 1:00 p.m.

Game information

First quarter
Second quarter
Third quarter
Fourth quarter

Statistics	MONM	DART
First downs		
Plays–yards		
Rushes–yards		
Passing yards		
Passing: comp–att–int		
Turnovers		
Time of possession		

Team	Category	Player	Statistics
Monmouth	Passing		
Monmouth	Rushing		
Monmouth	Receiving		
Dartmouth	Passing		
Dartmouth	Rushing		
Dartmouth	Receiving		

=== Towson ===
Towson Tigers (0–5) at Monmouth Hawks (3–2) – Game summary

Quarter	1	2	3	4	Total
Tigers	0	0	0	0	0
Hawks	0	0	0	0	0

at Kessler Stadium • West Long Branch, New Jersey

- Date: October 3
- Game time: 1:00 p.m.

Game information

First quarter
Second quarter
Third quarter
Fourth quarter

Statistics	TOW	MONM
First downs		
Plays–yards		
Rushes–yards		
Passing yards		
Passing: comp–att–int		
Turnovers		
Time of possession		

Team	Category	Player	Statistics
Towson	Passing		
Towson	Rushing		
Towson	Receiving		
Monmouth	Passing		
Monmouth	Rushing		
Monmouth	Receiving		

=== at New Hampshire ===
No. 23 Monmouth Hawks (4–2) at New Hampshire Wildcats (2–5) – Game summary

Quarter	1	2	3	4	Total
No. 23 Hawks	0	0	0	0	0
Wildcats	0	0	0	0	0

at Wildcat Stadium • Durham, New Hampshire

- Date: October 17
- Game time: 1:00 p.m.

Game information

First quarter
Second quarter
Third quarter
Fourth quarter

Statistics	MONM	UNH
First downs		
Plays–yards		
Rushes–yards		
Passing yards		
Passing: comp–att–int		
Turnovers		
Time of possession		

Team	Category	Player	Statistics
Monmouth	Passing		
Monmouth	Rushing		
Monmouth	Receiving		
New Hampshire	Passing		
New Hampshire	Rushing		
New Hampshire	Receiving		

=== at Hampton ===
No. 19 Monmouth Hawks (5–2) at Hampton Pirates (1–6) – Game summary

Quarter	1	2	3	4	Total
No. 19 Hawks	0	0	0	0	0
Pirates	0	0	0	0	0

at Armstrong Stadium • Hampton, Virginia

- Date: October 24
- Game time: 2:00 p.m.

Game information

First quarter
Second quarter
Third quarter
Fourth quarter

Statistics	MONM	HAMP
First downs		
Plays–yards		
Rushes–yards		
Passing yards		
Passing: comp–att–int		
Turnovers		
Time of possession		

Team	Category	Player	Statistics
Monmouth	Passing		
Monmouth	Rushing		
Monmouth	Receiving		
Hampton	Passing		
Hampton	Rushing		
Hampton	Receiving		

=== Bryant ===
Bryant Bulldogs (5–3) at No. 18 Monmouth Hawks (6–2) – Game summary

Quarter	1	2	3	4	Total
Bulldogs	0	0	0	0	0
No. 18 Hawks	0	0	0	0	0

at Kessler Stadium • West Long Branch, New Jersey

- Date: October 31
- Game time: 12:00 p.m.

Game information

First quarter
Second quarter
Third quarter
Fourth quarter

Statistics	BRY	MONM
First downs		
Plays–yards		
Rushes–yards		
Passing yards		
Passing: comp–att–int		
Turnovers		
Time of possession		

Team	Category	Player	Statistics
Bryant	Passing		
Bryant	Rushing		
Bryant	Receiving		
Monmouth	Passing		
Monmouth	Rushing		
Monmouth	Receiving		

=== North Carolina A&T ===
North Carolina A&T Aggies (4–5) at No. 15 Monmouth Hawks (7–2) – Game summary

Quarter	1	2	3	4	Total
Aggies	0	0	0	0	0
No. 15 Hawks	0	0	0	0	0

at Kessler Stadium • West Long Branch, New Jersey

- Date: November 7
- Game time: 12:00 p.m.

Game information

First quarter
Second quarter
Third quarter
Fourth quarter

Statistics	NCAT	MONM
First downs		
Plays–yards		
Rushes–yards		
Passing yards		
Passing: comp–att–int		
Turnovers		
Time of possession		

Team	Category	Player	Statistics
North Carolina A&T	Passing		
North Carolina A&T	Rushing		
North Carolina A&T	Receiving		
Monmouth	Passing		
Monmouth	Rushing		
Monmouth	Receiving		

=== Merrimack ===
Merrimack Warriors (4–6) at No. 14 Monmouth Hawks (7–2) – Game summary

Quarter	1	2	3	4	Total
Warriors	0	0	0	0	0
No. 14 Hawks	0	0	0	0	0

at Kessler Stadium • West Long Branch, New Jersey

- Date: November 12
- Game time: 12:00 p.m.

Game information

First quarter
Second quarter
Third quarter
Fourth quarter

Statistics	MRMK	MONM
First downs		
Plays–yards		
Rushes–yards		
Passing yards		
Passing: comp–att–int		
Turnovers		
Time of possession		

Team	Category	Player	Statistics
Merrimack	Passing		
Merrimack	Rushing		
Merrimack	Receiving		
Monmouth	Passing		
Monmouth	Rushing		
Monmouth	Receiving		

=== at No. 22 Campbell ===
No. 18 Monmouth Hawks (8–3) at No. 22 Campbell Fighting Camels (8–3) – Game summary

Quarter	1	2	3	4	Total
No. 18 Hawks	0	0	0	0	0
No. 22 Fighting Camels	0	0	0	0	0

at Barker–Lane Stadium • Buies Creek, North Carolina

- Date: November 21
- Game time: 1:00 p.m.

Game information

First quarter
Second quarter
Third quarter
Fourth quarter

Statistics	MONM	CAM
First downs		
Plays–yards		
Rushes–yards		
Passing yards		
Passing: comp–att–int		
Turnovers		
Time of possession		

Team	Category	Player	Statistics
Monmouth	Passing		
Monmouth	Rushing		
Monmouth	Receiving		
Campbell	Passing		
Campbell	Rushing		
Campbell	Receiving		

== Rankings ==
Ranking movements Legend: ██ Increase in ranking ██ Decrease in ranking — = Not ranked RV = Received votes
	Week														
Poll	Pre	1	2	3	4	5	6	7	8	9	10	11	12	13	Final
STATS	22	RV	RV	—	RV	RV	RV	23	19	18	15	14	18		
Coaches	23	RV	RV	RV	RV	RV	24	20	18	17	14	14	20		
