= Tom Perkovich =

American football coach (born 1980)

Current position
- Title: Head coach
- Team: Albany
- Conference: CAA
- Record: 7–4

Biographical details
- Born: December 18, 1980 (age 45); Kenmore, New York, U.S.
- Education: Canisius University (2003)

Playing career

Football
- 1999–2002: Canisius

Basketball
- 1999–2002: Canisius
- Positions: Offensive lineman (football); Forward (basketball)

Coaching career (HC unless noted)

Football
- 2003–2004: Muhlenberg (RB)
- 2005: Holy Cross (TE)
- 2006: Colgate (RB)
- 2007–2010: Muhlenberg (ST/OL)
- 2011–2014: Muhlenberg (OC)
- 2015–2025: Susquehanna
- 2026–present: Albany

Head coaching record
- Overall: 90–29
- Bowls: 4–0
- Tournaments: 6–4 (NCAA D-III playoffs)

Accomplishments and honors

Championships
- 1 Centennial (2022); 3 Landmark (2023–2025)

Tom Perkovich (born December 18, 1980) is an American college football coach. He is the head football coach for the Albany Great Danes, a position he has held since 2025. Previously, he served as the head coach for Susquehanna University from 2015 until 2025. He also coached for Muhlenberg, Holy Cross, and Colgate. He played college football and college basketball for Canisius.

== Head coaching record ==
Year	Team	Overall	Conference	Standing	Bowl/playoffs	D3^{#}	AFCA^{°}
Susquehanna River Hawks (Centennial Conference) (2015–2022)
2015	Susquehanna	0–5	0–5	6th			
2016	Susquehanna	6–4	6–3	T–3rd	Ineligible for post-season play due to NCAA sanctions		
2017	Susquehanna	8–3	6–3	T–3rd	W Centennial–MAC		
2018	Susquehanna	7–3	6–3	T–3rd	W Centennial–MAC		
2019	Susquehanna	10–1	8–1	2nd	W Centennial–MAC	16	
2020–21	No team—COVID-19						
2021	Susquehanna	9–2	7–2	3rd	W Centennial–MAC		
2022	Susquehanna	10–1	9–0	1st	L NCAA Division III First Round	20	
Susquehanna River Hawks (Landmark Conference) (2023–2025)
2023	Susquehanna	10–1	6–0	1st	L NCAA Division III First Round	9	14
2024	Susquehanna	12–2	6–0	1st	L NCAA Division III Semifinal	6	6
2025	Susquehanna	11–3	6–0	1st	L NCAA Division III Quarterfinal	13	15
Susquehanna:		83–25	60–17				
Albany Great Danes football (Coastal Athletic Association) (2026–present)
2026	Albany	7–4	5–2				
Albany:		7–4	5–2				
Total:		90–29					
National championship Conference title Conference division title or championship game berth
