= 2026 New Hampshire Wildcats football team =

American college football season

2026 New Hampshire Wildcats football
- Conference: CAA Football
- Record: 5–7 (4–4 CAA)
- Head coach: Sean Goldrich (1st season)
- Offensive coordinator: Gage Hayes (1st season)
- Defensive coordinator: Nic Keene (1st season)
- Home stadium: Wildcat Stadium

2026 Coastal Athletic Association Football Conference standings
	Conf.			Overall
Team	W		L	W		L
No. 18 Monmouth $^	7	–	0	8	–	3
No. 22 Campbell	5	–	2	8	–	3
Albany	5	–	2	7	–	4
Bryant	5	–	2	7	–	4
North Carolina A&T	4	–	3	5	–	6
Elon	4	–	3	6	–	5
Sacred Heart	4	–	4	4	–	6
Stony Brook	3	–	4	5	–	6
New Hampshire	3	–	4	4	–	7
Towson	3	–	4	3	–	8
Rhode Island	2	–	5	5	–	6
Maine	1	–	6	1	–	9
Hampton	0	–	7	1	–	10
$ – Conference champion; ^ – FCS playoff participant; As of November 22, 2026; Rankings from STATS Poll

The 2026 New Hampshire Wildcats football team represent the University of New Hampshire as a member of the Coastal Athletic Association Football Conference (CAA) in the 2026 NCAA Division I FCS football season. The Wildcats are led by first-year head coach Sean Goldrich, and play their home games at Wildcat Stadium.

== Schedule ==
Date	Time	Opponent	Site	TV	Result	Attendance
August 28	7:00 p.m.	at Albany	Bob Ford Field; Albany, NY	FloSports	L 14–28	6,601
September 5	12:00 p.m.	at Syracuse*	JMA Wireless Dome; Syracuse, NY	ACCN	L 3–66	33,257
September 12	6:00 p.m.	Stonehill*	Wildcat Stadium; Durham, NH	FloSports	W 42–35	5,480
September 19	1:00 p.m.	No. 25 Harvard*	Wildcat Stadium; Durham, NH	FloSports	L 7–31	5,169
September 26	12:00 p.m.	at Sacred Heart	Sikorsky Credit Union Field; Fairfield, CT	FloSports	L 13–20	8,911
October 3	1:00 p.m.	Elon^{†}	Wildcat Stadium; Durham, NH	FloSports	W 30–23	5,398
October 10	12:00 p.m.	at North Carolina A&T	Truist Stadium; Greensboro, NC	FloSports	L 27–30 ^{OT}	1,329
October 17	1:00 p.m.	No. 23 Monmouth	Wildcat Stadium; Durham, NH	FloSports	L 21–42	8,693
October 24	12:00 p.m.	at Merrimack*	Duane Stadium; North Andover, MA	ESPN+	L 17–24	4,491
November 7	1:00 p.m.	Rhode Island	Wildcat Stadium; Durham, NH	FloSports	W 24–21	3,906
November 14	1:00 p.m.	Stony Brook	Wildcat Stadium; Durham, NH	FloSports	W 20–17	3,846
November 21	1:00 p.m.	at Maine	Alfond Sports Stadium; Orono, ME (Battle for the Brice–Cowell Musket)	ESPN+	W 24–21	3,103
*Non-conference game; ^{†}Homecoming; Rankings from STATS Poll released prior to the game; All times are in Eastern time

== Game summaries ==
=== at Albany ===
New Hampshire Wildcats (0–0) at Albany Great Danes (0–0) – Game summary

Quarter	1	2	3	4	Total
Wildcats	7	0	7	0	14
Great Danes	7	14	7	0	28

at Tom & Mary Casey Stadium • Albany, New York

- Date: August 28
- Game time: 7:00 p.m.
- Game weather: Sunny • Temperature: 72 °F (22 °C) • Wind: NW at 10 miles per hour (16 km/h)
- Game attendance: 6,601
- Referee: Cory Hanson
- TV announcers (FloSports): TBD

Game information

First quarter

- UNH – Myles Thomason 4-yard pass from Brooks Bentley (Lucas Glassburn kick), 8:13. Wildcats 7–0. Drive: 10 plays, 40 yards, 4:03.
- ALB – Rahshan La Mons 1-yard run (RJ Kocan kick), 4:13. Tied 7–7. Drive: 7 plays, 78 yards, 3:54.

Second quarter

- ALB – Aidan Semo 1-yard run (RJ Kocan kick), 6:05. Great Danes 14–7. Drive: 14 plays, 85 yards, 10:06.
- ALB – Joey Koch 3-yard run (RJ Kocan kick), 2:21. Great Danes 21–7. Drive: 4 plays, 92 yards, 2:17.

Third quarter

- UNH – Ja'Carree Kelly 45-yard pass from Brooks Bentley (Lucas Glassburn kick), 14:21. Great Danes 21–14. Drive: 2 plays, 74 yards, 0:37.
- ALB – Aidan Semo 8-yard run (RJ Kocan kick), 8:31. Great Danes 28–14. Drive: 5 plays, 66 yards, 2:00.

Fourth quarter

- No scoring plays.

Statistics	UNH	ALB
First downs	16	25
Plays–yards	54–297	71–431
Rushes–yards	24–62	53–374
Passing yards	235	57
Passing: comp–att–int	20–30–1	7–18–1
Turnovers	1	1
Time of possession	20:52	39:08

Team	Category	Player	Statistics
New Hampshire	Passing	Brooks Bentley	19/27, 230 yards, 2 TD
New Hampshire	Rushing	Myles Thomason	10 carries, 53 yards
New Hampshire	Receiving	Ja'Carree Kelly	6 receptions, 123 yards, TD
Albany	Passing	Kai Colon	7/17, 57 yards, INT
Albany	Rushing	Joey Koch	7 carries, 144 yards, TD
Albany	Receiving	Tavahri Groves	2 receptions, 22 yards

=== at Syracuse (FBS) ===
New Hampshire Wildcats (0–1) at Syracuse Orange (FBS) (0–0) – Game summary

Quarter	1	2	3	4	Total
Wildcats	0	0	0	3	3
Orange (FBS)	14	27	2	23	66

at JMA Wireless Dome • Syracuse, New York

- Date: September 5
- Game time: 12:00 p.m.
- Game weather: none (played indoors)
- Game attendance: 33,257
- Referee: Nolan Dumas
- TV announcers (ACCN): Roxy Bernstein, Dave Clawson and Madison Hock

Game information

First quarter

- SYR – Umari Hatcher 19-yard pass from Steve Angeli (Tripp Woody kick), 4:27. Orange 7–0. Drive: 9 plays, 77 yards, 3:51.
- SYR – Shavane Anderson Jr. 2-yard run (Tripp Woody kick), 1:35. Orange 14–0. Drive: 5 plays, 50 yards, 1:19.

Second quarter

- SYR – Tylik Hill 2-yard run (Tripp Woody kick), 9:31. Orange 21–0. Drive: 10 plays, 65 yards, 4:50.
- SYR – Shavane Anderson Jr. 15-yard run (Tripp Woody kick failed), 6:58. Orange 27–0. Drive: 2 plays, 40 yards, 0:34.
- SYR – David Clement 27-yard pass from Steve Angeli (Tripp Woody kick), 4:38. Orange 34–0. Drive: 2 plays, 21 yards, 0:22.
- SYR – Shavane Anderson Jr. 2-yard run (Tripp Woody kick), 1:42. Orange 41–0. Drive: 6 plays, 75 yards, 1:56.

Third quarter

- SYR – Team safety, 13:30. Orange 43–0.

Fourth quarter

- UNH – Lucas Glassburn 46-yard field goal, 14:50. Orange 43–3. Drive: 8 plays, 70 yards, 3:09.
- SYR – Umari Hatcher 18-yard pass from Steve Angeli (Tripp Woody kick), 13:16. Orange 50–3. Drive: 4 plays, 62 yards, 1:29.
- SYR – Zyian Moultrie-Goddard 26-yard fumble return (Tripp Woody kick), 11:53. Orange 57–3.
- SYR – Daunte Bacheyie 7-yard pass from Amari Odom (Tripp Woody kick failed), 8:52. Orange 63–3. Drive: 5 plays, 15 yards, 2:08.
- SYR – Tripp Woody 34-yard field goal, 0:48. Orange 66–3. Drive: 12 plays, 49 yards, 5:26.

Statistics	UNH	SYR
First downs	11	32
Plays–yards	58–154	77–514
Rushes–yards	34–56	43–238
Passing yards	99	275
Passing: comp–att–int	15–26–1	22–34–0
Turnovers	3	0
Time of possession	27:26	32:34

Team	Category	Player	Statistics
New Hampshire	Passing	Brooks Bentley	11/18, 75 yards, INT
New Hampshire	Rushing	Joquez Smith	8 carries, 60 yards
New Hampshire	Receiving	Myles Thomason	7 receptions, 53 yards
Syracuse	Passing	Steve Angeli	20/29, 263 yards, 3 TD
Syracuse	Rushing	Shavane Anderson Jr.	10 carries, 102 yards, 3 TD
Syracuse	Receiving	Umari Hatcher	8 receptions, 147 yards, 2 TD

=== Stonehill ===
Stonehill Skyhawks (1–1) at New Hampshire Wildcats (0–2) – Game summary

Quarter	1	2	3	4	Total
Skyhawks	7	7	7	14	35
Wildcats	14	7	14	7	42

at Wildcat Stadium • Durham, New Hampshire

- Date: September 12
- Game time: 6:00 p.m.
- Game weather: Sunny
- Game attendance: 5,480
- Referee: Alex Parrella
- TV announcers (FloSports): Calvin Christoforo (play-by-play) and Ben Altsher (analyst)

Game information

First quarter

- (14:47) UNH – Ryan Ricketti 96-yard kickoff return, Lucas Glassburn kick (New Hampshire 7–0)
- (11:03) STO – Shane Eason 3-yard run, Domenic Scalese kick (Drive: 9 plays, 59 yards, 3:38; Tied 7–7)
- (1:37) UNH – Trevor Barry 71-yard blocked field goal return, Lucas Glassburn kick (New Hampshire 14–7)

Second quarter

- (12:46) STO – Kevin Sheridan 16-yard pass from Jack O'Connell, Langdon Laws Jr. kick (Drive: 8 plays, 65 yards, 3:51; Tied 14–14)
- (5:55) UNH – Joquez Smith 26-yard run, Lucas Glassburn kick (Drive: 6 plays, 80 yards, 2:50; New Hampshire 21–14)

Third quarter

- (6:33) UNH – Ty Carlson 5-yard pass from Brooks Bentley, Lucas Glassburn kick (Drive: 8 plays, 66 yards, 2:04; New Hampshire 28–14)
- (3:44) STO – Jaylin Baker 6-yard pass from Jack O'Connell, Langdon Laws Jr. kick (Drive: 5 plays, 65 yards, 2:49; New Hampshire 28–21)
- (2:18) UNH – Joquez Smith 34-yard run, Lucas Glassburn kick (Drive: 4 plays, 75 yards, 1:26; New Hampshire 35–21)

Fourth quarter

- (14:06) STO – Jaylin Baker 21-yard pass from Jack O'Connell, Langdon Laws Jr. kick (Drive: 7 plays, 75 yards, 3:05; New Hampshire 35–28)
- (11:06) UNH – Joquez Smith 3-yard run, Lucas Glassburn kick (Drive: 7 plays, 65 yards, 2:55; New Hampshire 42–28)
- (5:41) STO – Cole Clarke 6-yard pass from Jack O'Connell, Langdon Laws Jr. kick (Drive: 11 plays, 75 yards, 5:18; New Hampshire 42–35)

Statistics	STO	UNH
First downs	26	17
Plays–yards	81–514	53–348
Rushes–yards	37–134	31–153
Passing yards	380	195
Passing: comp–att–int	27–44–0	14–22–0
Turnovers	1	0
Time of possession	37:58	22:02

Team	Category	Player	Statistics
Stonehill	Passing	Jack O'Connell	27/44, 380 yards, 4 TD
Stonehill	Rushing	Jack O'Connell	17 carries, 53 yards
Stonehill	Receiving	Cole Clarke	4 receptions, 88 yards, TD
New Hampshire	Passing	Brooks Bentley	14/22, 195 yards, TD
New Hampshire	Rushing	Joquez Smith	13 carries, 122 yards, 3 TD
New Hampshire	Receiving	Ja'Carree Kelly	5 receptions, 78 yards

=== No. 25 Harvard ===
No. 25 Harvard Crimson (0–0) at New Hampshire Wildcats (1–2) – Game summary

Quarter	1	2	3	4	Total
No. 25 Crimson	0	21	0	10	31
Wildcats	0	7	0	0	7

at Wildcat Stadium • Durham, New Hampshire

- Date: September 19
- Game time: 1:00 p.m.
- Game weather: Sunny • Temperature: 70 °F (21 °C)
- Game attendance: 5,169
- Referee: Eric Lewis
- TV announcers (FloSports): Calvin Christoforo (play-by-play) and Ben Altsher (analyst)

Game information

First quarter

No scoring plays

Second quarter

- HARV – Kise Flannery 1-yard run (Kieran Corr kick), 11:47. Crimson 7–0. Drive: 4 plays, 32 yards, 2:20.
- UNH – Brooks Bentley 1-yard run (Lucas Glassburn kick), 6:44. Tied 7–7. Drive: 11 plays, 75 yards, 5:03.
- HARV – Nathan Bailey 23-yard run (Kieran Corr kick), 0:53. Crimson 14–7. Drive: 9 plays, 71 yards, 2:05.
- HARV – Nathan Bailey 13-yard pass from Charlie Smith (Kieran Corr kick), 0:18. Crimson 21–7. Drive: 1 play, 13 yards, 0:05.

Third quarter

No scoring plays

Fourth quarter

- HARV – Kieran Corr 24-yard field goal, 11:39. Crimson 24–7. Drive: 13 plays, 84 yards, 7:09.
- HARV – Xaviah Bascon 1-yard run (Kieran Corr kick), 8:48. Crimson 31–7. Drive: 3 plays, 25 yards, 1:15.

Statistics	HARV	UNH
First downs	18	13
Plays–yards	65–262	75–235
Rushes–yards	44–188	38–49
Passing yards	74	186
Passing: comp–att–int	12–21–1	18–37–2
Turnovers	1	3
Time of possession	29:39	30:21

Team	Category	Player	Statistics
Harvard	Passing	Charlie Smith	11/19, 71 yards, TD, INT
Harvard	Rushing	Cole Allen	12 carries, 62 yards
Harvard	Receiving	Maddux Reid	1 reception, 22 yards
New Hampshire	Passing	Brooks Bentley	18/37, 186 yards, 2 INT
New Hampshire	Rushing	Joquez Smith	10 carries, 50 yards
New Hampshire	Receiving	Ty Carlson	3 receptions, 56 yards

=== at Sacred Heart ===
New Hampshire Wildcats (1–3) at Sacred Heart Pioneers (0–3) – Game summary

Quarter	1	2	3	4	Total
Wildcats	0	0	0	0	0
Pioneers	0	0	0	0	0

at Campus Field • Fairfield, Connecticut

- Date: September 26
- Game time: 12:00 p.m.
- Game attendance: 8,911
- TV: FloSports

Game information

First quarter
Second quarter
Third quarter
Fourth quarter

Statistics	UNH	SHU
First downs		
Plays–yards		
Rushes–yards		
Passing yards		
Passing: comp–att–int		
Turnovers		
Time of possession		

Team	Category	Player	Statistics
New Hampshire	Passing		
New Hampshire	Rushing		
New Hampshire	Receiving		
Sacred Heart	Passing		
Sacred Heart	Rushing		
Sacred Heart	Receiving		

=== Elon ===
Elon Phoenix (4–1) at New Hampshire Wildcats (1–4) – Game summary

Quarter	1	2	3	4	Total
Phoenix	0	0	0	0	0
Wildcats	0	0	0	0	0

at Wildcat Stadium • Durham, New Hampshire

- Date: October 3
- Game time: 1:00 p.m.
- Game attendance: 5,398
- TV: FloSports

Game information

First quarter
Second quarter
Third quarter
Fourth quarter

Statistics	ELON	UNH
First downs		
Plays–yards		
Rushes–yards		
Passing yards		
Passing: comp–att–int		
Turnovers		
Time of possession		

Team	Category	Player	Statistics
Elon	Passing		
Elon	Rushing		
Elon	Receiving		
New Hampshire	Passing		
New Hampshire	Rushing		
New Hampshire	Receiving		

=== at North Carolina A&T ===
New Hampshire Wildcats (2–4) at North Carolina A&T Aggies (1–5) – Game summary

Quarter	1	2	3	4	Total
Wildcats	0	0	0	0	0
Aggies	0	0	0	0	0

at Truist Stadium • Greensboro, North Carolina

- Date: October 10
- Game time: 12:00 p.m.
- Game attendance: 1,329
- TV: FloSports

Game information

First quarter
Second quarter
Third quarter
Fourth quarter

Statistics	UNH	NCAT
First downs		
Plays–yards		
Rushes–yards		
Passing yards		
Passing: comp–att–int		
Turnovers		
Time of possession		

Team	Category	Player	Statistics
New Hampshire	Passing		
New Hampshire	Rushing		
New Hampshire	Receiving		
North Carolina A&T	Passing		
North Carolina A&T	Rushing		
North Carolina A&T	Receiving		

=== No. 23 Monmouth ===
No. 23 Monmouth Hawks (4–2) at New Hampshire Wildcats (2–5) – Game summary

Quarter	1	2	3	4	Total
No. 23 Hawks	0	0	0	0	0
Wildcats	0	0	0	0	0

at Wildcat Stadium • Durham, New Hampshire

- Date: October 17
- Game time: 1:00 p.m.
- Game attendance: 8,693
- TV: FloSports

Game information

First quarter
Second quarter
Third quarter
Fourth quarter

Statistics	MONM	UNH
First downs		
Plays–yards		
Rushes–yards		
Passing yards		
Passing: comp–att–int		
Turnovers		
Time of possession		

Team	Category	Player	Statistics
Monmouth	Passing		
Monmouth	Rushing		
Monmouth	Receiving		
New Hampshire	Passing		
New Hampshire	Rushing		
New Hampshire	Receiving		

=== at Merrimack ===
New Hampshire Wildcats (2–6) at Merrimack Warriors (2–5) – Game summary

Quarter	1	2	3	4	Total
Wildcats	0	0	0	0	0
Warriors	0	0	0	0	0

at Duane Stadium • North Andover, Massachusetts

- Date: October 24
- Game time: 12:00 p.m.
- Game attendance: 4,491
- TV: ESPN+

Game information

First quarter
Second quarter
Third quarter
Fourth quarter

Statistics	UNH	MRMK
First downs		
Plays–yards		
Rushes–yards		
Passing yards		
Passing: comp–att–int		
Turnovers		
Time of possession		

Team	Category	Player	Statistics
New Hampshire	Passing		
New Hampshire	Rushing		
New Hampshire	Receiving		
Merrimack	Passing		
Merrimack	Rushing		
Merrimack	Receiving		

=== Rhode Island ===
Rhode Island Rams (5–4) at New Hampshire Wildcats (2–7) – Game summary

Quarter	1	2	3	4	Total
Rams	0	0	0	0	0
Wildcats	0	0	0	0	0

at Wildcat Stadium • Durham, New Hampshire

- Date: November 7
- Game time: 1:00 p.m.
- TV: FloSports

Game information

First quarter
Second quarter
Third quarter
Fourth quarter

Statistics	URI	UNH
First downs		
Plays–yards		
Rushes–yards		
Passing yards		
Passing: comp–att–int		
Turnovers		
Time of possession		

Team	Category	Player	Statistics
Rhode Island	Passing		
Rhode Island	Rushing		
Rhode Island	Receiving		
New Hampshire	Passing		
New Hampshire	Rushing		
New Hampshire	Receiving		

=== Stony Brook ===
Stony Brook Seawolves (5–5) at New Hampshire Wildcats (3–7) – Game summary

Quarter	1	2	3	4	Total
Seawolves	0	0	0	0	0
Wildcats	0	0	0	0	0

at Wildcat Stadium (University of New Hampshire)

- Date: November 14
- Game time: 1:00 p.m.
- TV: FloSports

Game information

First quarter
Second quarter
Third quarter
Fourth quarter

Statistics	STBK	UNH
First downs		
Plays–yards		
Rushes–yards		
Passing yards		
Passing: Comp–Att–Int		
Turnovers		
Time of possession		

Team	Category	Player	Statistics
Stony Brook	Passing		
Stony Brook	Rushing		
Stony Brook	Receiving		
New Hampshire	Passing		
New Hampshire	Rushing		
New Hampshire	Receiving		

=== at Maine (Battle for the Brice–Cowell Musket) ===
New Hampshire Wildcats (4–7) at Maine Black Bears (1–9) – Game summary

Quarter	1	2	3	4	Total
Wildcats	0	0	0	0	0
Black Bears	0	0	0	0	0

at Alfond Sports Stadium • Orono, Maine

- Date: November 21
- Game time: 1:00 p.m.
- TV announcers (ESPN+): TBD

Game information

First quarter
Second quarter
Third quarter
Fourth quarter

Statistics	UNH	ME
First downs		
Plays–yards		
Rushes–yards		
Passing yards		
Passing: comp–att–int		
Turnovers		
Time of possession		

Team	Category	Player	Statistics
New Hampshire	Passing		
New Hampshire	Rushing		
New Hampshire	Receiving		
Maine	Passing		
Maine	Rushing		
Maine	Receiving		
