= 2026 Bryant Bulldogs football team =

American college football season

2026 Bryant Bulldogs football
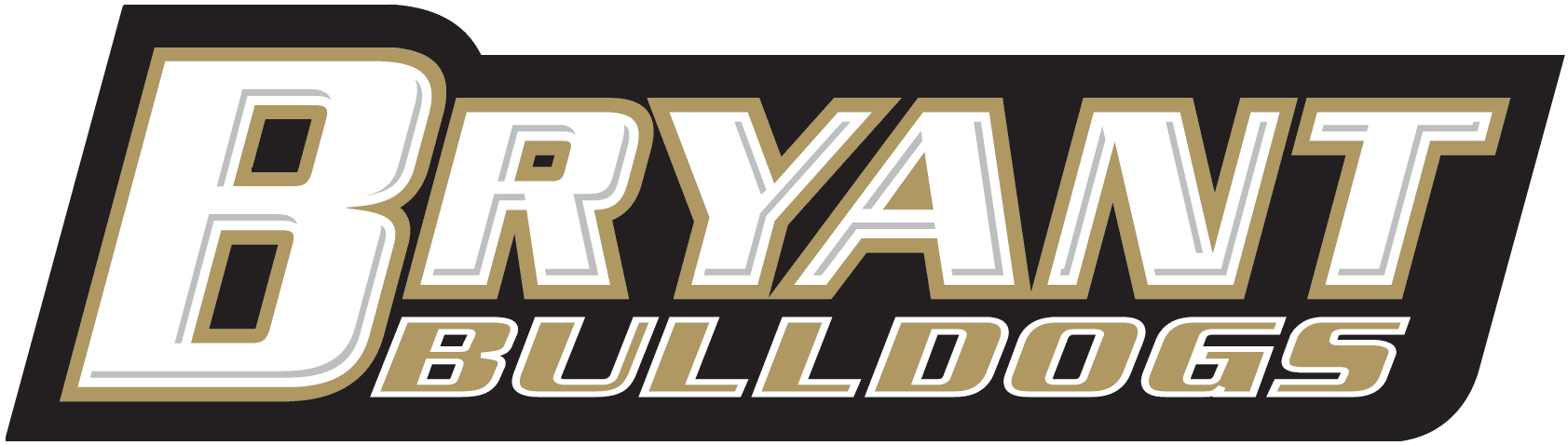
- Conference: CAA Football
- Record: 8–4 (6–2 CAA)
- Head coach: Chris Merritt (8th season)
- Offensive coordinator: Ben McKaig (3rd season)
- Defensive coordinator: Anthony Barese (7th season)
- Home stadium: Beirne Stadium

2026 Coastal Athletic Association Football Conference standings
	Conf.			Overall
Team	W		L	W		L
No. 18 Monmouth $^	8	–	0	9	–	3
Bryant	6	–	2	8	–	4
Albany	6	–	2	8	–	4
No. 22 Campbell	5	–	3	8	–	4
North Carolina A&T	4	–	4	5	–	7
Towson	4	–	4	4	–	8
Sacred Heart	4	–	4	5	–	6
New Hampshire	4	–	4	5	–	7
Stony Brook	4	–	4	6	–	6
Elon	4	–	4	6	–	6
Rhode Island	2	–	6	5	–	7
Maine	1	–	7	1	–	10
Hampton	0	–	8	1	–	11
$ – Conference champion; ^ – FCS playoff participant; As of November 22, 2026; Rankings from STATS Poll

The 2026 Bryant Bulldogs football team represent Bryant University as a member of the Coastal Athletic Association Football Conference (CAA Football) during the 2026 NCAA Division I FCS football season. The Bulldogs are led by eighth-year head coach Chris Merritt and play their home games at Beirne Stadium in Smithfield, Rhode Island.

== Schedule ==
Date	Time	Opponent	Site	TV	Result	Attendance
August 29	6:00 p.m.	at Stonehill*	W.B. Mason Stadium; Easton, MA	NEC Front Row	W 24–6	2,826
September 5	12:00 p.m.	at Army*	Michie Stadium; West Point, NY	CBSSN	L 3–59	21,538
September 12	6:00 p.m.	at Hampton	Armstrong Stadium; Hampton, VA	FloSports	W 31–3	2,985
September 19	1:00 p.m.	Princeton*	Beirne Stadium; Smithfield, RI	FloSports	W 21–14	3,411
October 3	1:00 p.m.	North Carolina A&T	Beirne Stadium; Smithfield, RI	FloSports	W 31–30	2,048
October 10	12:00 p.m.	at Brown*	Richard Gouse Field at Brown Stadium; Providence, RI	ESPN+	L 13–28	2,531
October 17	1:00 p.m.	at Maine	Alfond Sports Stadium; Orono, ME	FloSports	W 17–14	3,455
October 24	2:00 p.m.	Stony Brook	Beirne Stadium; Smithfield, RI	FloSports	L 17–27	6,427
October 31	12:00 p.m.	at No. 18 Monmouth	Kessler Field; West Long Branch, NJ	FloSports	L 21–34	3,642
November 7	1:00 p.m.	No. 21 Albany	Beirne Stadium; Smithfield, RI	FloSports	W 31–7	2,763
November 14	12:00 p.m.	at Sacred Heart	Sikorsky Credit Union Field; Fairfield, CT	FloSports	W 31–23	3,133
November 21	1:00 p.m.	Rhode Island	Beirne Stadium; Smithfield, RI	FloSports	W 28–7	2,500
*Non-conference game; Rankings from STATS Poll released prior to the game; All times are in Eastern time

== Game summaries ==
=== at Stonehill ===
Bryant Bulldogs (0–0) at Stonehill Skyhawks (0–0) – Game summary

Quarter	1	2	3	4	Total
Bulldogs	7	0	0	17	24
Skyhawks	0	3	0	3	6

at W.B. Mason Stadium • Easton, Massachusetts

- Date: August 29
- Game time: 6:00 p.m. EDT
- Game weather: Sunny • Temperature: 79 °F (26 °C) • Wind: SW at 3 miles per hour (4.8 km/h)
- Game attendance: 2,826
- Referee: Michael Davis
- TV: NEC Front Row

Game information

First quarter

- BRY – OJ Ross 10-yard run (Nicholas Stoyanovich kick), 1:04. Bulldogs 7–0. Drive: 11 plays, 56 yards, 5:59.

Second quarter

- STO – Domenic Scalese 29-yard field goal, 10:11. Bulldogs 7–3. Drive: 11 plays, 49 yards, 5:47.

Third quarter

- No scoring plays.

Fourth quarter

- BRY – Jordan Bennett 1-yard run (Nicholas Stoyanovich kick), 14:16. Bulldogs 14–3. Drive: 11 plays, 80 yards, 4:07.
- BRY – Brennan Myer 2-yard run (Nicholas Stoyanovich kick), 8:20. Bulldogs 21–3. Drive: 7 plays, 56 yards, 3:46.
- STO – Domenic Scalese 36-yard field goal, 5:33. Bulldogs 21–6. Drive: 8 plays, 61 yards, 2:41.
- BRY – Nicholas Stoyanovich 27-yard field goal, 1:45. Bulldogs 24–6. Drive: 9 plays, 38 yards, 3:46.

Statistics	BRY	STO
First downs	19	17
Plays–yards	65–299	62–304
Rushes–yards	44–191	32–102
Passing yards	108	202
Passing: comp–att–int	10–21–0	19–30–0
Turnovers	0	1
Time of possession	29:34	30:26

Team	Category	Player	Statistics
Bryant	Passing	Brennan Myer	10/20, 108 yards
Bryant	Rushing	OJ Ross	18 carries, 102 yards, TD
Bryant	Receiving	Sean Wilson Jr.	3 receptions, 43 yards
Stonehill	Passing	Jack O'Connell	19/30, 202 yards
Stonehill	Rushing	Shane Eason	9 carries, 50 yards
Stonehill	Receiving	Alijah Turner	3 receptions, 42 yards

=== at Army (FBS) ===
Bryant Bulldogs (1–0) at Army Black Knights (FBS) (0–0) – Game summary

Quarter	1	2	3	4	Total
Bulldogs	0	3	0	0	3
Black Knights (FBS)	21	10	14	14	59

at Michie Stadium • West Point, New York

- Date: September 5
- Game time: 12:00 p.m. EDT
- Game attendance: 21,538
- TV announcers (CBSSN): Jack Gordon, Taylor McHargue and Tina Cervasio

Game information

First quarter

- ARMY – Zach Mundell 15-yard run (Dawson Jones kick), 11:05. Black Knights 7–0. Drive: 5 plays, 39 yards, 2:18.
- ARMY – Cale Hellums 27-yard run (Dawson Jones kick), 7:36. Black Knights 14–0. Drive: 5 plays, 72 yards, 1:59.
- ARMY – Cale Hellums 37-yard run (Dawson Jones kick), 0:54. Black Knights 21–0. Drive: 10 plays, 75 yards, 4:54.

Second quarter

- ARMY – Brady Anderson 30-yard run (Dawson Jones kick), 7:24. Black Knights 28–0. Drive: 8 plays, 67 yards, 4:12.
- BRY – Nicholas Stoyanovich 28-yard field goal, 2:09. Black Knights 28–3. Drive: 12 plays, 64 yards, 5:09.
- ARMY – Dawson Jones 37-yard field goal, 0:48. Black Knights 31–3. Drive: 9 plays, 55 yards, 1:21.

Third quarter

- ARMY – Zach Mundell 66-yard run (Dawson Jones kick), 13:20. Black Knights 38–3. Drive: 3 plays, 72 yards, 1:32.
- ARMY – Godspower Nawauihe 2-yard run (Dawson Jones kick), 10:21. Black Knights 45–3. Drive: 3 plays, 29 yards, 1:06.

Fourth quarter

- ARMY – Carson Smith 6-yard run (Bryson Hosea kick), 10:43. Black Knights 52–3. Drive: 8 plays, 82 yards, 4:54.
- ARMY – Ethan Washington 1-yard run (Bryson Hosea kick), 5:12. Black Knights 59–3. Drive: 7 plays, 46 yards, 3:51.

Statistics	BRY	ARMY
First downs	9	31
Plays–yards	53–165	70–648
Rushes–yards	30–67	57–569
Passing yards	98	79
Passing: comp–att–int	11–23–0	7–13–0
Turnovers	0	0
Time of possession	27:02	32:58

Team	Category	Player	Statistics
Bryant	Passing	Brennan Myer	9/18, 88 yards
Bryant	Rushing	Jordan Bennett	8 carries, 29 yards
Bryant	Receiving	Keylijah Williams	1 reception, 24 yards
Army	Passing	Cale Hellums	4/9, 59 yards
Army	Rushing	Zach Mundell	4 carries, 105 yards, 2 TD
Army	Receiving	Samari Howard	3 receptions, 52 yards

=== at Hampton ===
Bryant Bulldogs (1–1) at Hampton Pirates (1–1) – Game summary

Quarter	1	2	3	4	Total
Bulldogs	0	0	0	0	0
Pirates	0	0	0	0	0

at Armstrong Stadium • Hampton, Virginia

- Date: September 12
- Game time: 6:00 p.m.

Game information

First quarter
Second quarter
Third quarter
Fourth quarter

Statistics	BRY	HAMP
First downs		
Plays–yards		
Rushes–yards		
Passing yards		
Passing: comp–att–int		
Turnovers		
Time of possession		

Team	Category	Player	Statistics
Bryant	Passing		
Bryant	Rushing		
Bryant	Receiving		
Hampton	Passing		
Hampton	Rushing		
Hampton	Receiving		

=== Princeton ===
Princeton Tigers (0–0) at Bryant Bulldogs (2–1) – Game summary

Quarter	1	2	3	4	Total
Tigers	0	0	0	0	0
Bulldogs	0	0	0	0	0

at Beirne Stadium • Smithfield, Rhode Island

- Date: September 19
- Game time: 1:00 p.m.
- TV: FloSports

Game information

First quarter
Second quarter
Third quarter
Fourth quarter

Statistics	PRIN	BRY
First downs		
Plays–yards		
Rushes–yards		
Passing yards		
Passing: comp–att–int		
Turnovers		
Time of possession		

Team	Category	Player	Statistics
Princeton	Passing		
Princeton	Rushing		
Princeton	Receiving		
Bryant	Passing		
Bryant	Rushing		
Bryant	Receiving		

=== North Carolina A&T ===
North Carolina A&T Aggies (1–4) at Bryant Bulldogs (3–1) – Game summary

Quarter	1	2	3	4	Total
Aggies	0	0	0	0	0
Bulldogs	0	0	0	0	0

at Beirne Stadium • Smithfield, Rhode Island

- Date: October 3
- Game time: 1:00 p.m.

Game information

First quarter
Second quarter
Third quarter
Fourth quarter

Statistics	NCAT	BRY
First downs		
Plays–yards		
Rushes–yards		
Passing yards		
Passing: comp–att–int		
Turnovers		
Time of possession		

Team	Category	Player	Statistics
North Carolina A&T	Passing		
North Carolina A&T	Rushing		
North Carolina A&T	Receiving		
Bryant	Passing		
Bryant	Rushing		
Bryant	Receiving		

=== at Brown ===
Bryant Bulldogs (4–1) at Brown Bears (1–2) – Game summary

Quarter	1	2	3	4	Total
Bulldogs	0	7	6	0	13
Bears	7	14	0	7	28

at Brown Stadium • Providence, Rhode Island

- Date: October 10
- Game time: 12:00 p.m.
- Game weather: Sunny • Temperature: 66 °F (19 °C) • Wind: NW at 10 miles per hour (16 km/h)
- Game attendance: 2,531
- Referee: Justin Ackley
- TV announcers (ESPN+): Scott Cordischi (play-by-play), John Anderson (analyst) and Nick Coit (sideline)

Game information

First quarter

- BRWN – Matt Childs 9-yard run (Drew Crabtree kick), 8:20. Bears 7–0. Drive: 6 plays, 55 yards, 2:55.

Second quarter

- BRWN – Qwentin Brown 1-yard run (Drew Crabtree kick), 12:16. Bears 14–0. Drive: 10 plays, 91 yards, 4:16.
- BRWN – Qwentin Brown 1-yard run (Drew Crabtree kick), 5:37. Bears 21–0. Drive: 8 plays, 79 yards, 3:41.
- BRY – Shamar Fowles 35-yard pass from Brennan Myer (Nicholas Stoyanovich kick), 3:36. Bears 21–7. Drive: 5 plays, 60 yards, 1:53.

Third quarter

- BRY – Nicholas Stoyanovich 31-yard field goal, 8:07. Bears 21–10. Drive: 15 plays, 56 yards, 6:50.
- BRY – Nicholas Stoyanovich 22-yard field goal, 1:09. Bears 21–13. Drive: 15 plays, 74 yards, 5:36.

Fourth quarter

- BRWN – Matt Childs 1-yard run (Drew Crabtree kick), 9:42. Bears 28–13. Drive: 14 plays, 70 yards, 6:23.

Statistics	BRY	BRWN
First downs	22	21
Plays–yards	72–408	70–383
Rushes–yards	34–100	45–185
Passing yards	308	198
Passing: comp–att–int	29–38–1	16–25–1
Turnovers	1	1
Time of possession	30:59	27:53

Team	Category	Player	Statistics
Bryant	Passing	Brennan Myer	29/38, 308 yards, TD, INT
Bryant	Rushing	OJ Ross	6 carries, 39 yards
Bryant	Receiving	Shamar Fowles	12 receptions, 135 yards, TD
Brown	Passing	James Murphy	16/25, 198 yards, INT
Brown	Rushing	Matt Childs	18 carries, 103 yards, 2 TD
Brown	Receiving	Pearson Hill	3 receptions, 56 yards

=== at Maine ===
Bryant Bulldogs (4–2) at Maine Black Bears (1–5) – Game summary

Quarter	1	2	3	4	Total
Bulldogs	0	0	0	0	0
Black Bears	0	0	0	0	0

at Alfond Sports Stadium • Orono, Maine

- Date: October 17
- Game time: 1:00 p.m.
- TV announcers (FloSports): TBD

Game information

First quarter
Second quarter
Third quarter
Fourth quarter

Statistics	BRY	ME
First downs		
Plays–yards		
Rushes–yards		
Passing yards		
Passing: comp–att–int		
Turnovers		
Time of possession		

Team	Category	Player	Statistics
Bryant	Passing		
Bryant	Rushing		
Bryant	Receiving		
Maine	Passing		
Maine	Rushing		
Maine	Receiving		

=== Stony Brook ===
Stony Brook Seawolves (4–3) at Bryant Bulldogs (5–2) – Game summary

Quarter	1	2	3	4	Total
Seawolves	0	0	0	0	0
Bulldogs	0	0	0	0	0

at Beirne Stadium • Smithfield, Rhode Island

- Date: October 24
- Game time: 2:00 p.m.
- TV: FloSports

Game information

First quarter
Second quarter
Third quarter
Fourth quarter

Statistics	STBK	BRY
First downs		
Plays–yards		
Rushes–yards		
Passing yards		
Passing: Comp–Att–Int		
Turnovers		
Time of possession		

Team	Category	Player	Statistics
Stony Brook	Passing		
Stony Brook	Rushing		
Stony Brook	Receiving		
Bryant	Passing		
Bryant	Rushing		
Bryant	Receiving		

=== at No. 18 Monmouth ===
Bryant Bulldogs (5–3) at No. 18 Monmouth Hawks (6–2) – Game summary

Quarter	1	2	3	4	Total
Bulldogs	0	0	0	0	0
No. 18 Hawks	0	0	0	0	0

at Kessler Stadium • West Long Branch, New Jersey

- Date: October 31
- Game time: 12:00 p.m.

Game information

First quarter
Second quarter
Third quarter
Fourth quarter

Statistics	BRY	MONM
First downs		
Plays–yards		
Rushes–yards		
Passing yards		
Passing: comp–att–int		
Turnovers		
Time of possession		

Team	Category	Player	Statistics
Bryant	Passing		
Bryant	Rushing		
Bryant	Receiving		
Monmouth	Passing		
Monmouth	Rushing		
Monmouth	Receiving		

=== No. 21 Albany ===
No. 21 Albany Great Danes (6–3) at Bryant Bulldogs (5–4) – Game summary

Quarter	1	2	3	4	Total
No. 21 Great Danes	0	0	0	0	0
Bulldogs	0	0	0	0	0

at Beirne Stadium • Smithfield, Rhode Island

- Date: November 7
- Game time: 1:00 p.m.

Game information

First quarter
Second quarter
Third quarter
Fourth quarter

Statistics	ALB	BRY
First downs		
Plays–yards		
Rushes–yards		
Passing yards		
Passing: comp–att–int		
Turnovers		
Time of possession		

Team	Category	Player	Statistics
Albany	Passing		
Albany	Rushing		
Albany	Receiving		
Bryant	Passing		
Bryant	Rushing		
Bryant	Receiving		

=== at Sacred Heart ===
Bryant Bulldogs (6–4) at Sacred Heart Pioneers (4–5) – Game summary

Quarter	1	2	3	4	Total
Bulldogs	0	0	0	0	0
Pioneers	0	0	0	0	0

at Campus Field • Fairfield, Connecticut

- Date: November 14
- Game time: 12:00 p.m.

Game information

First quarter
Second quarter
Third quarter
Fourth quarter

Statistics	BRY	SHU
First downs		
Plays–yards		
Rushes–yards		
Passing yards		
Passing: comp–att–int		
Turnovers		
Time of possession		

Team	Category	Player	Statistics
Bryant	Passing		
Bryant	Rushing		
Bryant	Receiving		
Sacred Heart	Passing		
Sacred Heart	Rushing		
Sacred Heart	Receiving		

=== Rhode Island ===
Rhode Island Rams (5–6) at Bryant Bulldogs (7–4) – Game summary

Quarter	1	2	3	4	Total
Rams	0	0	0	0	0
Bulldogs	0	0	0	0	0

at Beirne Stadium • Smithfield, Rhode Island

- Date: November 21
- Game time: 1:00 p.m.

Game information

First quarter
Second quarter
Third quarter
Fourth quarter

Statistics	URI	BRY
First downs		
Plays–yards		
Rushes–yards		
Passing yards		
Passing: comp–att–int		
Turnovers		
Time of possession		

Team	Category	Player	Statistics
Rhode Island	Passing		
Rhode Island	Rushing		
Rhode Island	Receiving		
Bryant	Passing		
Bryant	Rushing		
Bryant	Receiving		

== Rankings ==
Ranking movements Legend: ██ Increase in ranking ██ Decrease in ranking — = Not ranked RV = Received votes
	Week														
Poll	Pre	1	2	3	4	5	6	7	8	9	10	11	12	13	Final
STATS	—	—	—	—	—	—	RV	—	RV	—					
Coaches	—	—	—	—	RV	RV	RV	—	RV	RV					
