= 2026 Elon Phoenix football team =

American college football season

2026 Elon Phoenix football
- Conference: CAA Football
- Record: 6–6 (4–4 CAA)
- Head coach: Tony Trisciani (8th season)
- Offensive coordinator: Doug Martin (2nd season)
- Offensive scheme: Air raid
- Defensive coordinator: Casey Vance (2nd season)
- Base defense: Multiple 3–3–5
- Home stadium: Rhodes Stadium

2026 Coastal Athletic Association Football Conference standings
	Conf.			Overall
Team	W		L	W		L
No. 18 Monmouth $^	7	–	0	8	–	3
No. 22 Campbell	5	–	2	8	–	3
Albany	5	–	2	7	–	4
Bryant	5	–	2	7	–	4
North Carolina A&T	4	–	3	5	–	6
Elon	4	–	3	6	–	5
Sacred Heart	4	–	4	4	–	6
Stony Brook	3	–	4	5	–	6
New Hampshire	3	–	4	4	–	7
Towson	3	–	4	3	–	8
Rhode Island	2	–	5	5	–	6
Maine	1	–	6	1	–	9
Hampton	0	–	7	1	–	10
$ – Conference champion; ^ – FCS playoff participant; As of November 22, 2026; Rankings from STATS Poll

The 2026 Elon Phoenix football team represents Elon University as a member of the Coastal Athletic Association Football Conference (CAA) during the 2026 NCAA Division I FCS football season. The Phoenix are led by eighth-year head coach Tony Trisciani and play their home games at Rhodes Stadium in Elon, North Carolina.

== Schedule ==
Date	Time	Opponent	Site	TV	Result	Attendance
August 27	7:00 p.m.	Glenville State*	Rhodes Stadium; Elon, NC	FloSports	W 42–7	4,667
September 5	6:00 p.m.	at Davidson*	Davidson College Stadium; Davidson, NC	ESPN+	W 38–0	2,554
September 12	12:00 p.m.	at No. 8 Rhode Island	Centreville Bank Stadium; Pawtucket, RI	FloSports	L 10–31	4,306
September 19	6:00 p.m.	Sacred Heart	Rhodes Stadium; Elon, NC	FloSports	W 24–21	6,214
September 26	2:00 p.m.	Maine	Rhodes Stadium; Elon, NC	FloSports	W 43–17	11,309
October 3	1:00 p.m.	at New Hampshire	Wildcat Stadium; Durham, NH	FloSports	L 23–30	5,398
October 10	2:00 p.m.	Wofford*^{†}	Rhodes Stadium; Elon, NC	FloSports	L 0–16	5,379
October 17	7:30 p.m.	at Stanford*	Stanford Stadium; Stanford, CA	ACCNX	L 7–34	18,940
October 31	1:00 p.m.	at North Carolina A&T	Truist Stadium; Greensboro, NC	FloSports	L 10–13	22,401
November 7	2:00 p.m.	Hampton	Rhodes Stadium; Elon, NC	FloSports	W 24–6	3,482
November 14	2:00 p.m.	No. 16 Campbell	Rhodes Stadium; Elon, NC	FloSports	W 28–24	6,791
November 21	1:00 p.m.	at Towson	Johnny Unitas Stadium; Towson, MD	FloSports	L 24–28	4,272
*Non-conference game; ^{†}Homecoming; Rankings from STATS Poll released prior to the game; All times are in Eastern time

== Game summaries ==
=== Glenville State ===
Glenville State Pioneers (0–0) at Elon Phoenix (0–0) – Game summary

Quarter	1	2	3	4	Total
Pioneers	0	0	7	0	7
Phoenix	7	14	14	7	42

at Rhodes Stadium • Elon, North Carolina

- Date: August 27
- Game time: 7:00 p.m.
- Game weather: Cloudy
- Game attendance: 4,667
- Referee: Eric Lewis
- TV announcers (FloSports): Taylor Durham (play-by-play), Dr. Khirey Walker (analyst), and Hannah Bradey (sideline)

Game information

First quarter

- ELON – Brady Stober 2-yard run (Luke Barnes kick), 8:35. Phoenix 7–0. Drive: 10 plays, 58 yards, 7:25.

Second quarter

- ELON – Jimmyll Williams 10-yard run (Luke Barnes kick), 10:25. Phoenix 14–0. Drive: 4 plays, 47 yards, 1:41.
- ELON – Jamarien Dalton 3-yard pass from Brady Stober (Luke Barnes kick), 4:09. Phoenix 21–0. Drive: 11 plays, 70 yards, 4:56.

Third quarter

- GLN – Kyree Bunny 2-yard pass from JD Sherrod (Brody Layman kick), 9:00. Phoenix 21–7. Drive: 7 plays, 30 yards, 3:00.
- ELON – Jimmyll Williams 1-yard run (Luke Barnes kick), 5:37. Phoenix 28–7. Drive: 7 plays, 60 yards, 3:15.
- ELON – Ben Kirsch 10-yard pass from Brady Stober (Luke Barnes kick), 1:03. Phoenix 35–7. Drive: 6 plays, 65 yards, 2:15.

Fourth quarter

- ELON – Jaedon Alford 21-yard pass from TJ Crews IV (Luke Barnes kick), 2:41. Phoenix 42–7. Drive: 6 plays, 85 yards, 3:27.

Statistics	GLN	ELON
First downs	9	27
Plays–yards	54–125	77–446
Rushes–yards	19–51	50–168
Passing yards	74	278
Passing: comp–att–int	13–35–0	17–27–0
Turnovers	0	1
Time of possession	21:20	38:40

Team	Category	Player	Statistics
Glenville State	Passing	JD Sherrod	12/30, 76 yards, TD
Glenville State	Rushing	JD Sherrod	6 carries, 16 yards
Glenville State	Receiving	Caden Harris	4 receptions, 32 yards
Elon	Passing	Brady Stober	16/26, 254 yards, 2 TD
Elon	Rushing	Jimmyll Williams	17 carries, 77 yards, 2 TD
Elon	Receiving	Ben Kirsch	4 receptions, 68 yards, TD

=== at Davidson ===
Elon Phoenix (1–0) at Davidson Wildcats (0–1) – Game summary

Quarter	1	2	3	4	Total
Phoenix	3	21	7	7	38
Wildcats	0	0	0	0	0

at Davidson College Stadium • Davidson, North Carolina

- Date: September 5
- Game time: 6:00 p.m.
- Game weather: Sunny • Temperature: 87 °F (31 °C)
- Game attendance: 2,554
- Referee: Jeff Page
- TV announcers (ESPN+): Jon Gross (play-by-play), and Mark Covert (analyst)

Game information

First quarter

- ELON – Luke Barnes 39-yard field goal, 12:15. Phoenix 3–0. Drive: 4 plays, 3 yards, 1:16.

Second quarter

- ELON – Kamerin McDowell-Moore 29-yard run (Luke Barnes kick), 11:37. Phoenix 10–0. Drive: 3 plays, 50 yards, 0:55.
- ELON – Jimmyll Williams 3-yard run (Luke Barnes kick), 9:26. Phoenix 17–0. Drive: 2 plays, 7 yards, 0:36.
- ELON – Jimmyll Williams 1-yard run (Luke Barnes kick), 11:37. Phoenix 24–0. Drive: 8 plays, 74 yards, 4:17.

Third quarter

- ELON – Jaedon Alford 36-yard pass from TJ Crews IV (Luke Barnes kick), 10:25. Phoenix 31–0. Drive: 5 plays, 77 yards, 2:26.

Fourth quarter

- ELON – Kamerin McDowell-Moore 1-yard run (Luke Barnes kick), 8:27. Phoenix 38–0. Drive: 9 plays, 57 yards, 5:09.

Statistics	ELON	DAV
First downs	17	11
Plays–yards	63–345	62–251
Rushes–yards	41–154	23–49
Passing yards	191	202
Passing: comp–att–int	12–22–0	17–39–0
Turnovers	0	0
Time of possession	30:42	29:18

Team	Category	Player	Statistics
Elon	Passing	TJ Crews IV	5/7, 108 yards, TD
Elon	Rushing	Kamerin McDowell-Moore	15 carries, 88 yards, 2 TD
Elon	Receiving	Jaedon Alford	2 receptions, 70 yards, TD
Davidson	Passing	Casey Bullock	13/32, 174 yards
Davidson	Rushing	Christos Tzoumakas	1 carry, 25 yards
Davidson	Receiving	Jacary Lightsey	3 receptions, 72 yards

=== at No. 8 Rhode Island ===
Elon Phoenix (2–0) at No. 8 Rhode Island Rams (1–1) – Game summary

Quarter	1	2	3	4	Total
Phoenix	0	0	0	0	0
No. 8 Rams	0	0	0	0	0

at Centreville Bank Stadium • Pawtucket, Rhode Island

- Date: September 12
- Game time: 12:00 p.m.

Game information

First quarter
Second quarter
Third quarter
Fourth quarter

Statistics	ELON	URI
First downs		
Plays–yards		
Rushes–yards		
Passing yards		
Passing: comp–att–int		
Turnovers		
Time of possession		

Team	Category	Player	Statistics
Elon	Passing		
Elon	Rushing		
Elon	Receiving		
Rhode Island	Passing		
Rhode Island	Rushing		
Rhode Island	Receiving		

=== Sacred Heart ===
Sacred Heart Pioneers (0–2) at Elon Phoenix (2–1) – Game summary

Quarter	1	2	3	4	Total
Pioneers	0	0	0	0	0
Phoenix	0	0	0	0	0

at Rhodes Stadium • Elon, North Carolina

- Date: September 19
- Game time: 6:00 p.m.
- TV announcers (FloSports): TBD

Game information

First quarter
Second quarter
Third quarter
Fourth quarter

Statistics	SHU	ELON
First downs		
Plays–yards		
Rushes–yards		
Passing yards		
Passing: comp–att–int		
Turnovers		
Time of possession		

Team	Category	Player	Statistics
Sacred Heart	Passing		
Sacred Heart	Rushing		
Sacred Heart	Receiving		
Elon	Passing		
Elon	Rushing		
Elon	Receiving		

=== Maine ===
Maine Black Bears (1–3) at Elon Phoenix (3–1) – Game summary

Quarter	1	2	3	4	Total
Black Bears	0	0	0	0	0
Phoenix	0	0	0	0	0

at Rhodes Stadium • Elon, North Carolina

- Date: September 26
- Game time: 2:00 p.m.
- TV announcers (FloSports): TBD

Game information

First quarter
Second quarter
Third quarter
Fourth quarter

Statistics	ME	ELON
First downs		
Plays–yards		
Rushes–yards		
Passing yards		
Passing: comp–att–int		
Turnovers		
Time of possession		

Team	Category	Player	Statistics
Maine	Passing		
Maine	Rushing		
Maine	Receiving		
Elon	Passing		
Elon	Rushing		
Elon	Receiving		

=== at New Hampshire ===
Elon Phoenix (4–1) at New Hampshire Wildcats (1–4) – Game summary

Quarter	1	2	3	4	Total
Phoenix	0	0	0	0	0
Wildcats	0	0	0	0	0

at Wildcat Stadium • Durham, New Hampshire

- Date: October 3
- Game time: 1:00 p.m.

Game information

First quarter
Second quarter
Third quarter
Fourth quarter

Statistics	ELON	UNH
First downs		
Plays–yards		
Rushes–yards		
Passing yards		
Passing: comp–att–int		
Turnovers		
Time of possession		

Team	Category	Player	Statistics
Elon	Passing		
Elon	Rushing		
Elon	Receiving		
New Hampshire	Passing		
New Hampshire	Rushing		
New Hampshire	Receiving		

=== Wofford ===
Wofford Terriers (3–3) at Elon Phoenix (4–2) – Game summary

Quarter	1	2	3	4	Total
Terriers	0	0	0	0	0
Phoenix	0	0	0	0	0

at Rhodes Stadium • Elon, North Carolina

- Date: October 10
- Game time: 2:00 p.m.

Game information

First quarter
Second quarter
Third quarter
Fourth quarter

Statistics	WOF	ELON
First downs		
Plays–yards		
Rushes–yards		
Passing yards		
Passing: comp–att–int		
Turnovers		
Time of possession		

Team	Category	Player	Statistics
Wofford	Passing		
Wofford	Rushing		
Wofford	Receiving		
Elon	Passing		
Elon	Rushing		
Elon	Receiving		

=== at Stanford (FBS) ===
Elon Phoenix (4–3) at Stanford Cardinal (2–4) – Game summary

Quarter	1	2	3	4	Total
Phoenix	0	0	0	0	0
Cardinal (FBS)	0	0	0	0	0

at Stanford Stadium • Stanford, California

- Date: October 17
- Game time: 7:30 p.m.
- TV: ACCNX

Game information

First quarter
Second quarter
Third quarter
Fourth quarter

Statistics	ELON	STAN
First downs		
Plays–yards		
Rushes–yards		
Passing yards		
Passing: comp–att–int		
Turnovers		
Time of possession		

Team	Category	Player	Statistics
Elon	Passing		
Elon	Rushing		
Elon	Receiving		
Stanford	Passing		
Stanford	Rushing		
Stanford	Receiving		

=== at North Carolina A&T ===
Elon Phoenix (4–4) at North Carolina A&T Aggies (3–5) – Game summary

Quarter	1	2	3	4	Total
Phoenix	0	0	0	0	0
Aggies	0	0	0	0	0

at Truist Stadium • Greensboro, North Carolina

- Date: October 31
- Game time: 1:00 p.m.

Game information

First quarter
Second quarter
Third quarter
Fourth quarter

Statistics	ELON	NCAT
First downs		
Plays–yards		
Rushes–yards		
Passing yards		
Passing: comp–att–int		
Turnovers		
Time of possession		

Team	Category	Player	Statistics
Elon	Passing		
Elon	Rushing		
Elon	Receiving		
North Carolina A&T	Passing		
North Carolina A&T	Rushing		
North Carolina A&T	Receiving		

=== Hampton ===
Hampton Pirates (1–8) at Elon Phoenix (4–5) – Game summary

Quarter	1	2	3	4	Total
Pirates	0	0	0	0	0
Phoenix	0	0	0	0	0

at Rhodes Stadium • Elon, North Carolina

- Date: November 7
- Game time: 2:00 p.m.
- TV: FloSports

Game information

First quarter
Second quarter
Third quarter
Fourth quarter

Statistics	HAMP	ELON
First downs		
Plays–yards		
Rushes–yards		
Passing yards		
Passing: comp–att–int		
Turnovers		
Time of possession		

Team	Category	Player	Statistics
Hampton	Passing		
Hampton	Rushing		
Hampton	Receiving		
Elon	Passing		
Elon	Rushing		
Elon	Receiving		

=== No. 16 Campbell ===
No. 16 Campbell Fighting Camels (8–2) at Elon Phoenix (5–5) – Game summary

Quarter	1	2	3	4	Total
No. 16 Fighting Camels	0	0	0	0	0
Phoenix	0	0	0	0	0

at Rhodes Stadium • Elon, North Carolina

- Date: November 14
- Game time: 2:00 p.m.
- TV: FloSports

Game information

First quarter
Second quarter
Third quarter
Fourth quarter

Statistics	CAM	ELON
First downs		
Plays–yards		
Rushes–yards		
Passing yards		
Passing: comp–att–int		
Turnovers		
Time of possession		

Team	Category	Player	Statistics
Campbell	Passing		
Campbell	Rushing		
Campbell	Receiving		
Elon	Passing		
Elon	Rushing		
Elon	Receiving		

=== at Towson ===
Elon Phoenix (6–5) at Towson Tigers (3–8) – Game summary

Quarter	1	2	3	4	Total
Phoenix	0	0	0	0	0
Tigers	0	0	0	0	0

at Johnny Unitas Stadium • Towson, Maryland

- Date: November 21
- Game time: 1:00 p.m.

Game information

First quarter
Second quarter
Third quarter
Fourth quarter

Statistics	ELON	TOW
First downs		
Plays–yards		
Rushes–yards		
Passing yards		
Passing: comp–att–int		
Turnovers		
Time of possession		

Team	Category	Player	Statistics
Elon	Passing		
Elon	Rushing		
Elon	Receiving		
Towson	Passing		
Towson	Rushing		
Towson	Receiving		

== Rankings ==
Ranking movements Legend: RV = Received votes
	Week														
Poll	Pre	1	2	3	4	5	6	7	8	9	10	11	12	13	Final
STATS	RV	RV	RV	RV	RV	RV	RV								
Coaches	RV	RV	RV	RV	RV	RV	RV								
