= 2026 Hampton Pirates football team =

American college football season

2026 Hampton Pirates football
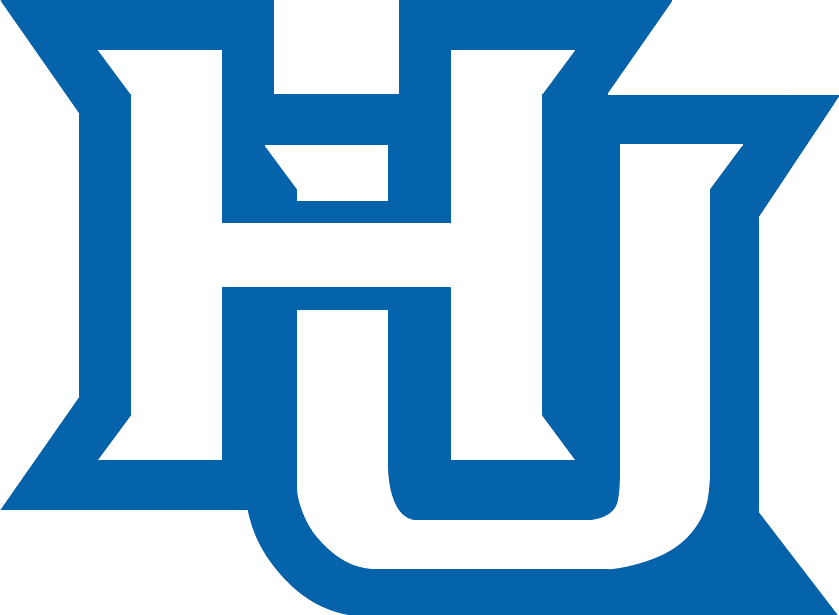
- Conference: CAA Football
- Record: 1–11 (0–8 CAA)
- Head coach: Van Malone (1st season)
- Offensive coordinator: DJ Boldin (1st season)
- Defensive coordinator: Clay Jennings (1st season)
- Home stadium: Armstrong Stadium

2026 Coastal Athletic Association Football Conference standings
	Conf.			Overall
Team	W		L	W		L
No. 18 Monmouth $^	8	–	0	9	–	3
Bryant	6	–	2	8	–	4
Albany	6	–	2	8	–	4
No. 22 Campbell	5	–	3	8	–	4
North Carolina A&T	4	–	4	5	–	7
Towson	4	–	4	4	–	8
Sacred Heart	4	–	4	5	–	6
New Hampshire	4	–	4	5	–	7
Stony Brook	4	–	4	6	–	6
Elon	4	–	4	6	–	6
Rhode Island	2	–	6	5	–	7
Maine	1	–	7	1	–	10
Hampton	0	–	8	1	–	11
$ – Conference champion; ^ – FCS playoff participant; As of November 22, 2026; Rankings from STATS Poll

The 2026 Hampton Pirates football team represented Hampton University as a member of the Coastal Athletic Association Football Conference (CAA) during the 2026 NCAA Division I FCS football season. The Pirates were led by first-year head coach Van Malone, and played their home games at Armstrong Stadium in Hampton, Virginia.

== Schedule ==
Date	Time	Opponent	Site	TV	Result	Attendance
August 29	6:00 p.m.	VUL*	Armstrong Stadium; Hampton, VA	FloSports	W 45–0	5,173
September 5	8:00 p.m.	at Maryland*	SECU Stadium; College Park, MD	BTN	L 0–62	43,421
September 12	6:00 p.m.	Bryant	Armstrong Stadium; Hampton, VA	FloSports	L 3–31	2,985
September 19	8:00 p.m.	at Norfolk State*	William "Dick" Price Stadium; Norfolk, VA	MEAC Network	L 21–42	17,239
September 26	6:00 p.m.	No. 22 Campbell	Armstrong Stadium; Hampton, VA	FloSports	L 20–44	3,209
October 3	3:00 p.m.	vs. Howard*	Audi Field; Washington, DC (The Real HU)	HBCU GO	L 13–27	15,389
October 17	12:00 p.m.	at Sacred Heart	Sikorsky Credit Union Field; Fairfield, CT	FloSports	L 21–35	3,674
October 24	2:00 p.m.	No. 19 Monmouth^{†}	Armstrong Stadium; Hampton, VA	FloSports	L 13–49	7,992
October 31	1:00 p.m.	at Towson	Johnny Unitas Stadium; Towson, MD	FloSports	L 13–44	4,388
November 7	2:00 p.m.	at Elon	Rhodes Stadium; Elon, NC	FloSports	L 6–24	3,482
November 14	1:00 p.m.	North Carolina A&T	Armstrong Stadium; Hampton, VA	FloSports	L 14–41	5,192
November 21	12:00 p.m.	at Stony Brook	Kenneth P. LaValle Stadium; Stony Brook, NY	FloSports	L 10–20	3,549
*Non-conference game; ^{†}Homecoming; Rankings from STATS Poll released prior to the game; All times are in Eastern time

== Game summaries ==
=== VUL (NCCAA) ===
VUL Dragons (0–0) at Hampton Pirates (0–0) – Game summary

Quarter	1	2	3	4	Total
Dragons (NCCAA)	0	0	0	0	0
Pirates	7	10	21	7	45

at Armstrong Stadium • Hampton, Virginia

- Date: August 29
- Game time: 6:00 p.m.
- Game weather: Sunny
- Game attendance: 5,173
- Referee: Terry Jones
- TV: FloSports

Game information

First quarter

- HAMP – Gracen Goldsmith 5-yard run (Brett Starling kick), 3:14. Pirates 7–0. Drive: 8 plays, 28 yards, 4:17.

Second quarter

- HAMP – Dedrick Borden 13-yard pass from Jalen Woods (Brett Starling kick), 9:06. Pirates 14–0. Drive: 4 plays, 41 yards, 1:50.
- HAMP – Brett Starling 42-yard field goal, 0:00. Pirates 17–0. Drive: 8 plays, 31 yards, 1:12.

Third quarter

- HAMP – Caden Rice 32-yard interception return (Brett Starling kick), 13:07. Pirates 24–0.
- HAMP – Chaz Portis 25-yard pass from Jalen Woods (Brett Starling kick), 8:31. Pirates 31–0. Drive: 7 plays, 25 yards, 2:45.
- HAMP – Jalen Walker 16-yard pass from Jalen Woods (Brett Starling kick), 4:09. Pirates 38–0. Drive: 6 plays, 94 yards, 1:43.

Fourth quarter

- HAMP – Ja'Sean Lindsey 1-yard run (Brett Starling kick), 10:13. Pirates 45–0. Drive: 15 plays, 76 yards, 6:37.

Statistics	VUL	HAMP
First downs	12	22
Plays–yards	68–220	70–476
Rushes–yards	31–54	40–263
Passing yards	166	213
Passing: comp–att–int	23–37–1	17–30–1
Turnovers	3	3
Time of possession	30:31	29:23

Team	Category	Player	Statistics
VUL	Passing	Thomas Adamsky	9/15, 82 yards, INT
VUL	Rushing	Israel Rhodes	15 carries, 45 yards
VUL	Receiving	Dustin Placide	5 receptions, 49 yards
Hampton	Passing	Jalen Woods	15/26, 191 yards, 3 TD, INT
Hampton	Rushing	Amari Pryear	8 carries, 132 yards
Hampton	Receiving	Dedrick Borden	3 receptions, 45 yards, TD

=== at Maryland (FBS) ===
Hampton Pirates (1–0) at Maryland Terrapins (FBS) (0–0) – Game summary

Quarter	1	2	3	4	Total
Pirates	0	0	0	0	0
Terrapins (FBS)	17	17	21	7	62

at SECU Stadium • College Park, Maryland

- Date: September 5
- Game time: 8:00 p.m.
- Game weather: Sunny • Temperature: 77 °F (25 °C) • Wind: NE at 3 miles per hour (4.8 km/h)
- Game attendance: 43,421
- Referee: Jeremy Valentine
- TV announcers (BTN): Joe Beninati, Matt Millen and Michella Chester

Game information

First quarter

- MD – DeJuan Williams 94-yard run (Sean O'Haire kick), 9:30. Terrapins 7–0. Drive: 1 play, 94 yards, 0:14.
- MD – DeJuan Williams 8-yard run (Sean O'Haire kick), 4:43. Terrapins 14–0. Drive: 5 plays, 36 yards, 1:47.
- MD – Sean O'Haire 26-yard field goal, 1:28. Terrapins 17–0. Drive: 4 plays, -1 yard, 0:49.

Second quarter

- MD – Sean O'Haire 36-yard field goal, 12:32. Terrapins 20–0. Drive: 6 plays, 49 yards, 2:16.
- MD – Iverson Howard 11-yard run (Sean O'Haire kick), 5:54. Terrapins 27–0. Drive: 11 plays, 75 yards, 4:33.
- MD – Na'eem Abdul-Rahim Gladding 10-yard pass from Malik Washington (Sean O'Haire kick), 0:06. Terrapins 34–0. Drive: 10 plays, 64 yards, 1:28.

Third quarter

- MD – Iverson Howard 8-yard run (Sean O'Haire kick), 11:24. Terrapins 41–0. Drive: 8 plays, 54 yards, 2:31.
- MD – Harry Dalton III 9-yard run (Sean O'Haire kick), 8:08. Terrapins 48–0. Drive: 4 plays, 56 yards, 1:16.
- MD – Jordan Scott 16-yard pass from Cardell Williams (Sean O'Haire kick), 2:32. Terrapins 55–0. Drive: 8 plays, 70 yards, 3:37.

Fourth quarter

- MD – Jianni Davis 5-yard run (Eli Fulcher kick), 13:19. Terrapins 62–0. Drive: 5 plays, 39 yards, 2:52.

Statistics	HAMP	MD
First downs	6	31
Plays–yards	50–85	78–646
Rushes–yards	31–10	40–365
Passing yards	75	281
Passing: comp–att–int	10–19–3	25–38–0
Turnovers	3	0
Time of possession	30:57	29:03

Team	Category	Player	Statistics
Hampton	Passing	Jalen Woods	7/12, 56 yards, 2 INT
Hampton	Rushing	Gracen Goldsmith	7 carries, 26 yards
Hampton	Receiving	Chaz Portis	2 receptions, 40 yards
Maryland	Passing	Malik Washington	19/31, 186 yards, TD
Maryland	Rushing	DeJuan Williams	3 carries, 116 yards, 2 TD
Maryland	Receiving	Na'eem Abdul-Rahim Gladding	6 receptions, 57 yards, TD

=== Bryant ===
Bryant Bulldogs (1–1) at Hampton Pirates (1–1) – Game summary

Quarter	1	2	3	4	Total
Bulldogs	0	0	0	0	0
Pirates	0	0	0	0	0

at Armstrong Stadium • Hampton, Virginia

- Date: September 12
- Game time: 6:00 p.m.

Game information

First quarter
Second quarter
Third quarter
Fourth quarter

Statistics	BRY	HAMP
First downs		
Plays–yards		
Rushes–yards		
Passing yards		
Passing: comp–att–int		
Turnovers		
Time of possession		

Team	Category	Player	Statistics
Bryant	Passing		
Bryant	Rushing		
Bryant	Receiving		
Hampton	Passing		
Hampton	Rushing		
Hampton	Receiving		

=== at Norfolk State (Battle of the Bay) ===
Hampton Pirates (1–2) at Norfolk State Spartans (1–2) – Game summary

Quarter	1	2	3	4	Total
Pirates	0	0	0	0	0
Spartans	0	0	0	0	0

at William "Dick" Price Stadium • Norfolk, Virginia

- Date: September 19
- Game time: 4:00 p.m.
- TV: MEAC Network

Game information

First quarter
Second quarter
Third quarter
Fourth quarter

Statistics	HAMP	NORF
First downs		
Plays–yards		
Rushes–yards		
Passing yards		
Passing: comp–att–int		
Turnovers		
Time of possession		

Team	Category	Player	Statistics
Hampton	Passing		
Hampton	Rushing		
Hampton	Receiving		
Norfolk State	Passing		
Norfolk State	Rushing		
Norfolk State	Receiving		

=== No. 22 Campbell ===
No. 22 Campbell Fighting Camels (3–1) at Hampton Pirates (1–3) – Game summary

Quarter	1	2	3	4	Total
No. 22 Fighting Camels	0	0	0	0	0
Pirates	0	0	0	0	0

at Armstrong Stadium • Hampton, Virginia

- Date: September 26
- Game time: 6:00 PM

Game information

First quarter
Second quarter
Third quarter
Fourth quarter

Statistics	CAM	HAMP
First downs		
Plays–yards		
Rushes–yards		
Passing yards		
Passing: Comp–Att–Int		
Turnovers		
Time of possession		

Team	Category	Player	Statistics
Campbell	Passing		
Campbell	Rushing		
Campbell	Receiving		
Hampton	Passing		
Hampton	Rushing		
Hampton	Receiving		

=== vs. Howard (The Real HU) ===
Howard Bison (1–3) vs. Hampton Pirates (1–4) – Game summary

Quarter	1	2	3	4	Total
Bison	0	0	0	0	0
Pirates	0	0	0	0	0

at Audi Field • Washington, DC

- Date: October 3
- Game time: 3:00 p.m.
- TV: HBCU GO

Game information

First quarter
Second quarter
Third quarter
Fourth quarter

Statistics	HOW	HAMP
First downs		
Plays–yards		
Rushes–yards		
Passing yards		
Passing: comp–att–int		
Turnovers		
Time of possession		

Team	Category	Player	Statistics
Howard	Passing		
Howard	Rushing		
Howard	Receiving		
Hampton	Passing		
Hampton	Rushing		
Hampton	Receiving		

=== at Sacred Heart ===
Hampton Pirates (1–5) at Sacred Heart Pioneers (2–4) – Game summary

Quarter	1	2	3	4	Total
Pirates	0	0	0	0	0
Pioneers	0	0	0	0	0

at Campus Field • Fairfield, Connecticut

- Date: October 17
- Game time: 12:00 p.m.
- TV: FloSports

Game information

First quarter
Second quarter
Third quarter
Fourth quarter

Statistics	HAMP	SHU
First downs		
Plays–yards		
Rushes–yards		
Passing yards		
Passing: comp–att–int		
Turnovers		
Time of possession		

Team	Category	Player	Statistics
Hampton	Passing		
Hampton	Rushing		
Hampton	Receiving		
Sacred Heart	Passing		
Sacred Heart	Rushing		
Sacred Heart	Receiving		

=== No. 19 Monmouth ===
No. 19 Monmouth Hawks (5–2) at Hampton Pirates (1–6) – Game summary

Quarter	1	2	3	4	Total
No. 19 Hawks	0	0	0	0	0
Pirates	0	0	0	0	0

at Armstrong Stadium • Hampton, Virginia

- Date: October 24
- Game time: 2:00 p.m.

Game information

First quarter
Second quarter
Third quarter
Fourth quarter

Statistics	MONM	HAMP
First downs		
Plays–yards		
Rushes–yards		
Passing yards		
Passing: comp–att–int		
Turnovers		
Time of possession		

Team	Category	Player	Statistics
Monmouth	Passing		
Monmouth	Rushing		
Monmouth	Receiving		
Hampton	Passing		
Hampton	Rushing		
Hampton	Receiving		

=== at Towson ===
Hampton Pirates (1–7) at Towson Tigers (0–8) – Game summary

Quarter	1	2	3	4	Total
Pirates	0	0	0	0	0
Tigers	0	0	0	0	0

at Johnny Unitas Stadium • Towson, Maryland

- Date: October 31
- Game time: 1:00 p.m.

Game information

First quarter
Second quarter
Third quarter
Fourth quarter

Statistics	HAMP	TOW
First downs		
Plays–yards		
Rushes–yards		
Passing yards		
Passing: comp–att–int		
Turnovers		
Time of possession		

Team	Category	Player	Statistics
Hampton	Passing		
Hampton	Rushing		
Hampton	Receiving		
Towson	Passing		
Towson	Rushing		
Towson	Receiving		

=== at Elon ===
Hampton Pirates (1–8) at Elon Phoenix (4–5) – Game summary

Quarter	1	2	3	4	Total
Pirates	0	0	0	0	0
Phoenix	0	0	0	0	0

at Rhodes Stadium • Elon, North Carolina

- Date: November 7
- Game time: 2:00 p.m.
- TV: FloSports

Game information

First quarter
Second quarter
Third quarter
Fourth quarter

Statistics	HAMP	ELON
First downs		
Plays–yards		
Rushes–yards		
Passing yards		
Passing: comp–att–int		
Turnovers		
Time of possession		

Team	Category	Player	Statistics
Hampton	Passing		
Hampton	Rushing		
Hampton	Receiving		
Elon	Passing		
Elon	Rushing		
Elon	Receiving		

=== North Carolina A&T ===
North Carolina A&T Aggies (4–6) at Hampton Pirates (1–9) – Game summary

Quarter	1	2	3	4	Total
Aggies	0	0	0	0	0
Pirates	0	0	0	0	0

at Armstrong Stadium • Hampton, Virginia

- Date: November 14
- Game time: 1:00 PM

Game information

First quarter
Second quarter
Third quarter
Fourth quarter

Statistics	NCAT	HAMP
First downs		
Plays–yards		
Rushes–yards		
Passing yards		
Passing: Comp–Att–Int		
Turnovers		
Time of possession		

Team	Category	Player	Statistics
North Carolina A&T	Passing		
North Carolina A&T	Rushing		
North Carolina A&T	Receiving		
Hampton	Passing		
Hampton	Rushing		
Hampton	Receiving		

=== at Stony Brook ===
Hampton Pirates (1–10) at Stony Brook Seawolves (5–6) – Game summary

Quarter	1	2	3	4	Total
Pirates	0	0	0	0	0
Seawolves	0	0	0	0	0

at Kenneth P. LaValle Stadium • Stony Brook, New York

- Date: November 21
- Game time: 12:00 p.m.
- TV: FloSports

Game information

First quarter
Second quarter
Third quarter
Fourth quarter

Statistics	HAMP	STBK
First downs		
Plays–yards		
Rushes–yards		
Passing yards		
Passing: comp–att–int		
Turnovers		
Time of possession		

Team	Category	Player	Statistics
Hampton	Passing		
Hampton	Rushing		
Hampton	Receiving		
Stony Brook	Passing		
Stony Brook	Rushing		
Stony Brook	Receiving		
