= 2026 Albany Great Danes football team =

American college football season

2026 Albany Great Danes football
- Conference: CAA Football

Ranking
- FCS Coaches: No. 22
- Record: 8–4 (6–2 CAA)
- Head coach: Tom Perkovich (1st season)
- Defensive coordinator: Matt Scott (1st season)
- Home stadium: Bob Ford Field at Tom & Mary Casey Stadium

2026 Coastal Athletic Association Football Conference standings
	Conf.			Overall
Team	W		L	W		L
No. 18 Monmouth $^	8	–	0	9	–	3
Bryant	6	–	2	8	–	4
Albany	6	–	2	8	–	4
No. 22 Campbell	5	–	3	8	–	4
North Carolina A&T	4	–	4	5	–	7
Towson	4	–	4	4	–	8
Sacred Heart	4	–	4	5	–	6
New Hampshire	4	–	4	5	–	7
Stony Brook	4	–	4	6	–	6
Elon	4	–	4	6	–	6
Rhode Island	2	–	6	5	–	7
Maine	1	–	7	1	–	10
Hampton	0	–	8	1	–	11
$ – Conference champion; ^ – FCS playoff participant; As of November 22, 2026; Rankings from STATS Poll

The 2026 Albany Great Danes football team represent the University of Albany as a member of the Coastal Athletic Association Football Conference (CAA Football) during the 2026 NCAA Division I FCS football season. The Great Danes are led by 1st-year head coach Tom Perkovich and play their home games at Tom & Mary Casey Stadium in Albany, New York.

== Schedule ==
Date	Time	Opponent	Rank	Site	TV	Result	Attendance
August 28	7:00 p.m.	New Hampshire		Bob Ford Field at Tom & Mary Casey Stadium; Albany, NY	FloSports	W 28–14	6,601
September 3	7:00 p.m.	at Buffalo*		Broadview Stadium; Amherst, NY	ESPN+	L 17–21	8,690
September 12	12:00 p.m.	at LIU*		Bethpage Federal Credit Union Stadium; Brookville, NY	NEC Front Row	W 35–13	1,261
September 19	3:30 p.m.	Monmouth		Bob Ford Field at Tom & Mary Casey Stadium; Albany, NY	FloSports	L 20–28	6,132
September 26	3:00 p.m.	at Princeton*		Princeton Stadium; Princeton, NJ	ESPN+	L 0–22	3,902
October 3	3:30 p.m.	Delaware State*^{†}		Bob Ford Field at Tom & Mary Casey Stadium; Albany, NY	FloSports	W 28–3	8,500
October 17	2:30 p.m.	at Stony Brook		Kenneth P. LaValle Stadium; Stony Brook, NY (rivalry)	FloSports	W 48–31	6,101
October 24	12:00 p.m.	at Rhode Island		Centreville Bank Stadium; Pawtucket, RI	FloSports	W 38–21	4,033
October 31	12:00 p.m.	No. 12 Campbell		Bob Ford Field at Tom & Mary Casey Stadium; Albany, NY	FloSports	W 45–35	3,301
November 7	1:00 p.m.	at Bryant	No. 21	Beirne Stadium; Smithfield, RI	FloSports	L 7–31	2,763
November 14	12:00 p.m.	Maine		Bob Ford Field at Tom & Mary Casey Stadium; Albany, NY	FloSports	W 37–3	3,034
November 21	12:00 p.m.	at North Carolina A&T		Truist Stadium; Greensboro, NC	FloSports	W 24–7	8,321
*Non-conference game; ^{†}Homecoming; Rankings from STATS Poll released prior to the game; All times are in Eastern time

== Game summaries ==
=== New Hampshire ===
New Hampshire Wildcats (0–0) at Albany Great Danes (0–0) – Game summary

Quarter	1	2	3	4	Total
Wildcats	7	0	7	0	14
Great Danes	7	14	7	0	28

at Tom & Mary Casey Stadium • Albany, New York

- Date: August 28
- Game time: 7:00 p.m.
- Game weather: Sunny • Temperature: 72 °F (22 °C) • Wind: NW at 10 miles per hour (16 km/h)
- Game attendance: 6,601
- Referee: Cory Hanson
- TV announcers (FloSports): TBD

Game information

First quarter

- UNH – Myles Thomason 4-yard pass from Brooks Bentley (Lucas Glassburn kick), 8:13. Wildcats 7–0. Drive: 10 plays, 40 yards, 4:03.
- ALB – Rahshan La Mons 1-yard run (RJ Kocan kick), 4:13. Tied 7–7. Drive: 7 plays, 78 yards, 3:54.

Second quarter

- ALB – Aidan Semo 1-yard run (RJ Kocan kick), 6:05. Great Danes 14–7. Drive: 14 plays, 85 yards, 10:06.
- ALB – Joey Koch 3-yard run (RJ Kocan kick), 2:21. Great Danes 21–7. Drive: 4 plays, 92 yards, 2:17.

Third quarter

- UNH – Ja'Carree Kelly 45-yard pass from Brooks Bentley (Lucas Glassburn kick), 14:21. Great Danes 21–14. Drive: 2 plays, 74 yards, 0:37.
- ALB – Aidan Semo 8-yard run (RJ Kocan kick), 8:31. Great Danes 28–14. Drive: 5 plays, 66 yards, 2:00.

Fourth quarter

- No scoring plays.

Statistics	UNH	ALB
First downs	16	25
Plays–yards	54–297	71–431
Rushes–yards	24–62	53–374
Passing yards	235	57
Passing: comp–att–int	20–30–1	7–18–1
Turnovers	1	1
Time of possession	20:52	39:08

Team	Category	Player	Statistics
New Hampshire	Passing	Brooks Bentley	19/27, 230 yards, 2 TD
New Hampshire	Rushing	Myles Thomason	10 carries, 53 yards
New Hampshire	Receiving	Ja'Carree Kelly	6 receptions, 123 yards, TD
Albany	Passing	Kai Colon	7/17, 57 yards, INT
Albany	Rushing	Joey Koch	7 carries, 144 yards, TD
Albany	Receiving	Tavahri Groves	2 receptions, 22 yards

=== at Buffalo (FBS) ===
Albany Great Danes (1–0) at Buffalo Bulls (FBS) (0–0) – Game summary

Quarter	1	2	3	4	Total
Great Danes	7	3	7	0	17
Bulls (FBS)	0	14	0	7	21

at Broadview Stadium • Amherst, New York

- Date: September 3
- Game time: 7:00 p.m. (Note: After a lengthy weather delay, the game kicked off at 9:43 p.m.)
- Game weather: Sunny • Temperature: 77 °F (25 °C)
- Game attendance: 8,690
- Referee: Billy Williams
- TV announcers (ESPN+): Michael Reghi and Je'Rod Cherry

Game information

First quarter

- ALB – Tavahri Groves 14-yard pass from Kai Colon (RJ Kocan kick), 3:02. Great Danes 7–0. Drive: 5 plays, 86 yards, 2:13.

Second quarter

- BUFF – Chance Morrow 9-yard pass from Elijah Holmes (Oliver Hautanen kick), 11:23. Tied 7–7. Drive: 15 plays, 75 yards, 6:39.
- BUFF – Chance Morrow 4-yard pass from Elijah Holmes (Oliver Hautanen kick), 2:46. Bulls 14–7. Drive: 7 plays, 44 yards, 2:27.
- ALB – RJ Kocan 46-yard field goal, 0:15. Bulls 14–10. Drive: 6 plays, 21 yards, 0:31.

Third quarter

- ALB – Justus Murray Jr. 14-yard pass from Kai Colon (RJ Kocan kick), 3:23. Great Danes 17–14. Drive: 5 plays, 27 yards, 1:10.

Fourth quarter

- BUFF – Chance Morrow 5-yard pass from Elijah Holmes (Oliver Hautanen kick), 4:53. Bulls 21–17. Drive: 8 plays, 61 yards, 1:50.

In their second game of the season, the Great Danes lost, 21–17 to the Buffalo Bulls.

Statistics	ALB	BUFF
First downs	19	18
Plays–yards	72–276	80–340
Rushes–yards	31–72	33–151
Passing yards	204	189
Passing: comp–att–int	19–41–1	26–47–0
Turnovers	1	1
Time of possession	28:07	31:53

Team	Category	Player	Statistics
Albany	Passing	Kai Colon	16/36, 191 yards, 2 TD, INT
Albany	Rushing	Joey Koch	8 carries, 40 yards
Albany	Receiving	BJ Norman	6 receptions, 67 yards
Buffalo	Passing	Elijah Holmes	26/47, 189 yards, 3 TD
Buffalo	Rushing	Messiah Burch	8 carries, 74 yards
Buffalo	Receiving	Chance Morrow	7 receptions, 48 yards, 3 TD

=== at LIU ===
Albany Great Danes (1–1) at LIU Sharks (0–2) – Game summary

Quarter	1	2	3	4	Total
Great Danes	14	0	21	0	35
Sharks	0	7	0	6	13

at Bethpage Federal Credit Union Stadium • Brookville, New York

- Date: September 12
- Game time: 12:00 p.m.
- TV: NEC Front Row

Game information

First quarter

ALB - Viviano,Mitch 7 yd pass from Semo,Aidan (Kocan,RJ kick) 9 plays, 64 yards, TOP 04:31
ALB - Koch,Joey 3 yd pass from Colón,Kai (Kocan,RJ kick) 9 plays, 54 yards, TOP 05:34

Second quarter

LIU - Young,Joseph 3 yd pass from Stanzani,Luca (Johnson,Will kick) 10 plays, 42 yards, TOP 03:46

Third quarter

ALB - Norman,BJ 20 yd pass from Colón,Kai (Kocan,RJ kick) 5 plays, 33 yards, TOP 02:22
ALB - Rae,Jordan 33 yd pass from Colón,Kai (Kocan,RJ kick) 3 plays, 69 yards, TOP 01:29
ALB - Semo,Aidan 2 yd run (Kocan,RJ kick), 2 plays, 5 yards, TOP 00:40

Fourth quarter

LIU - Gray,Nathan 9 yd run ( ), 11 plays, 73 yards, TOP 05:20

Statistics	ALB	LIU
First downs	20	15
Plays–yards	63-343	60-221
Rushes–yards	34-106	39-143
Passing yards	237	78
Passing: comp–att–int		
Turnovers		
Time of possession	32:22	27:38

Team	Category	Player	Statistics
Albany	Passing		
Albany	Rushing		
Albany	Receiving		
LIU	Passing		
LIU	Rushing		
LIU	Receiving		

=== Monmouth ===
Monmouth Hawks (1–2) at Albany Great Danes (2–1) – Game summary

Quarter	1	2	3	4	Total
Hawks	0	0	0	0	0
Great Danes	0	0	0	0	0

at Tom & Mary Casey Stadium • Albany, New York

- Date: September 19
- Game time: 3:30 p.m.

Game information

First quarter
Second quarter
Third quarter
Fourth quarter

Statistics	MONM	ALB
First downs		
Plays–yards		
Rushes–yards		
Passing yards		
Passing: comp–att–int		
Turnovers		
Time of possession		

Team	Category	Player	Statistics
Monmouth	Passing		
Monmouth	Rushing		
Monmouth	Receiving		
Albany	Passing		
Albany	Rushing		
Albany	Receiving		

=== at Princeton ===
Albany Great Danes (2–2) at Princeton Tigers (0–1) – Game summary

Quarter	1	2	3	4	Total
Great Danes	0	0	0	0	0
Tigers	0	0	0	0	0

at Princeton Stadium • Princeton, New Jersey

- Date: September 26
- Game time: 3:00 p.m.
- TV: ESPN+

Game information

First quarter
Second quarter
Third quarter
Fourth quarter

Statistics	ALB	PRIN
First downs		
Plays–yards		
Rushes–yards		
Passing yards		
Passing: comp–att–int		
Turnovers		
Time of possession		

Team	Category	Player	Statistics
Albany	Passing		
Albany	Rushing		
Albany	Receiving		
Princeton	Passing		
Princeton	Rushing		
Princeton	Receiving		

=== Delaware State ===
Delaware State Hornets (3–2) at Albany Great Danes (2–3) – Game summary

Quarter	1	2	3	4	Total
Hornets	0	0	0	0	0
Great Danes	0	0	0	0	0

at Tom & Mary Casey Stadium • Albany, New York

- Date: October 3
- Game time: 3:30 p.m.

Game information

First quarter
Second quarter
Third quarter
Fourth quarter

Statistics	DSU	ALB
First downs		
Plays–yards		
Rushes–yards		
Passing yards		
Passing: comp–att–int		
Turnovers		
Time of possession		

Team	Category	Player	Statistics
Delaware State	Passing		
Delaware State	Rushing		
Delaware State	Receiving		
Albany	Passing		
Albany	Rushing		
Albany	Receiving		

=== at Stony Brook (rivalry) ===
Albany Great Danes (3–3) at Stony Brook Seawolves (4–2) – Game summary

Quarter	1	2	3	4	Total
Great Danes	0	0	0	0	0
Seawolves	0	0	0	0	0

at Kenneth P. LaValle Stadium • Stony Brook, New York

- Date: October 17
- Game time: 2:30 p.m.
- TV: FloSports

Game information

First quarter
Second quarter
Third quarter
Fourth quarter

Statistics	ALB	STBK
First downs		
Plays–yards		
Rushes–yards		
Passing yards		
Passing: Comp–Att–Int		
Turnovers		
Time of possession		

Team	Category	Player	Statistics
Albany	Passing		
Albany	Rushing		
Albany	Receiving		
Stony Brook	Passing		
Stony Brook	Rushing		
Stony Brook	Receiving		

=== at Rhode Island ===
Albany Great Danes (4–3) at Rhode Island Rams (4–3) – Game summary

Quarter	1	2	3	4	Total
Great Danes	0	0	0	0	0
Rams	0	0	0	0	0

at Centreville Bank Stadium • Pawtucket, Rhode Island

- Date: October 24
- Game time: 12:00 p.m.

Game information

First quarter
Second quarter
Third quarter
Fourth quarter

Statistics	ALB	URI
First downs		
Plays–yards		
Rushes–yards		
Passing yards		
Passing: comp–att–int		
Turnovers		
Time of possession		

Team	Category	Player	Statistics
Albany	Passing		
Albany	Rushing		
Albany	Receiving		
Rhode Island	Passing		
Rhode Island	Rushing		
Rhode Island	Receiving		

=== No. 12 Campbell ===
No. 12 Campbell Fighting Camels (7–1) at Albany Great Danes (5–3) – Game summary

Quarter	1	2	3	4	Total
No. 12 Fighting Camels	0	0	0	0	0
Great Danes	0	0	0	0	0

at Tom & Mary Casey Stadium • Albany, New York

- Date: October 31
- Game time: 12:00 p.m.
- TV announcers (FloSports): TBD

Game information

First quarter
Second quarter
Third quarter
Fourth quarter

Statistics	CAM	ALB
First downs		
Plays–yards		
Rushes–yards		
Passing yards		
Passing: comp–att–int		
Turnovers		
Time of possession		

Team	Category	Player	Statistics
Campbell	Passing		
Campbell	Rushing		
Campbell	Receiving		
Albany	Passing		
Albany	Rushing		
Albany	Receiving		

=== at Bryant ===
No. 21 Albany Great Danes (6–3) at Bryant Bulldogs (5–4) – Game summary

Quarter	1	2	3	4	Total
No. 21 Great Danes	0	0	0	0	0
Bulldogs	0	0	0	0	0

at Beirne Stadium • Smithfield, Rhode Island

- Date: November 7
- Game time: 1:00 p.m.

Game information

First quarter
Second quarter
Third quarter
Fourth quarter

Statistics	ALB	BRY
First downs		
Plays–yards		
Rushes–yards		
Passing yards		
Passing: comp–att–int		
Turnovers		
Time of possession		

Team	Category	Player	Statistics
Albany	Passing		
Albany	Rushing		
Albany	Receiving		
Bryant	Passing		
Bryant	Rushing		
Bryant	Receiving		

=== Maine ===
Maine Black Bears (1–8) at Albany Great Danes (6–4) – Game summary

Quarter	1	2	3	4	Total
Black Bears	0	0	0	0	0
Great Danes	0	0	0	0	0

at Tom & Mary Casey Stadium • Albany, New York

- Date: November 14
- Game time: 12:00 p.m.
- TV announcers (FloSports): TBD

Game information

First quarter
Second quarter
Third quarter
Fourth quarter

Statistics	ME	ALB
First downs		
Plays–yards		
Rushes–yards		
Passing yards		
Passing: comp–att–int		
Turnovers		
Time of possession		

Team	Category	Player	Statistics
Maine	Passing		
Maine	Rushing		
Maine	Receiving		
Albany	Passing		
Albany	Rushing		
Albany	Receiving		

=== at North Carolina A&T ===
Albany Great Danes (7–4) at North Carolina A&T Aggies (5–6) – Game summary

Quarter	1	2	3	4	Total
Great Danes	0	0	0	0	0
Aggies	0	0	0	0	0

at Truist Stadium • Greensboro, North Carolina

- Date: November 21
- Game time: 12:00 p.m.

Game information

First quarter
Second quarter
Third quarter
Fourth quarter

Statistics	ALB	NCAT
First downs		
Plays–yards		
Rushes–yards		
Passing yards		
Passing: comp–att–int		
Turnovers		
Time of possession		

Team	Category	Player	Statistics
Albany	Passing		
Albany	Rushing		
Albany	Receiving		
North Carolina A&T	Passing		
North Carolina A&T	Rushing		
North Carolina A&T	Receiving		

== Rankings ==
Ranking movements Legend: ██ Increase in ranking ██ Decrease in ranking — = Not ranked RV = Received votes
	Week														
Poll	Pre	1	2	3	4	5	6	7	8	9	10	11	12	13	Final
STATS	—	RV	RV	RV	—	—	—	—	RV	RV	21	RV	RV		
Coaches	—	—	—	RV	—	—	—	—	RV	25	20	25	22		
