= 2026 North Carolina A&T Aggies football team =

American college football season

2026 North Carolina A&T Aggies football
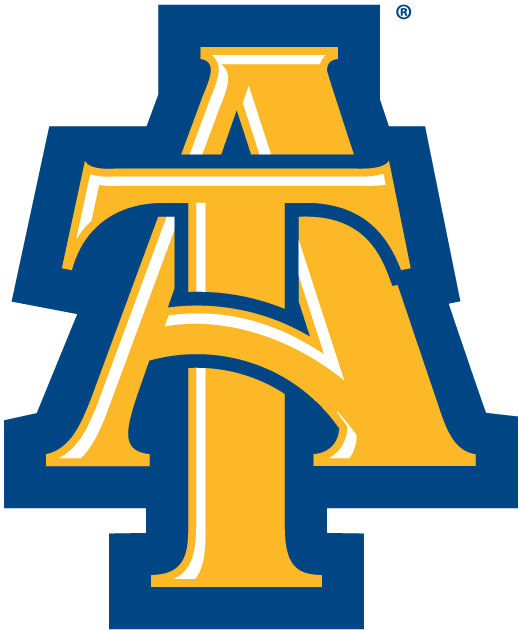
- Conference: CAA Football
- Record: 5–7 (4–4 CAA)
- Head coach: Shawn Gibbs (2nd season)
- Offensive coordinator: Greg McGhee (2nd season)
- Defensive coordinator: Denzel Jones (2nd season)
- Home stadium: Truist Stadium

2026 Coastal Athletic Association Football Conference standings
	Conf.			Overall
Team	W		L	W		L
No. 18 Monmouth $^	7	–	0	8	–	3
No. 22 Campbell	5	–	2	8	–	3
Albany	5	–	2	7	–	4
Bryant	5	–	2	7	–	4
North Carolina A&T	4	–	3	5	–	6
Elon	4	–	3	6	–	5
Sacred Heart	4	–	4	4	–	6
Stony Brook	3	–	4	5	–	6
New Hampshire	3	–	4	4	–	7
Towson	3	–	4	3	–	8
Rhode Island	2	–	5	5	–	6
Maine	1	–	6	1	–	9
Hampton	0	–	7	1	–	10
$ – Conference champion; ^ – FCS playoff participant; As of November 22, 2026; Rankings from STATS Poll

The 2026 North Carolina A&T Aggies football team represent North Carolina A&T State University as a member of the Coastal Athletic Association Football Conference (CAA) during the 2026 NCAA Division I FCS football season. The Aggies are led by second-year head coach Shawn Gibbs and play their home games at Truist Stadium in Greensboro, North Carolina.

== Schedule ==
Date	Time	Opponent	Site	TV	Result	Attendance
August 29	6:00 p.m.	Morgan State*	Truist Stadium; Greensboro, NC	FloSports	L 7–17	16,264
September 4	7:00 p.m.	at Georgia State*	Center Parc Stadium; Atlanta, GA	ESPN+	L 10–59	16,703
September 12	6:00 p.m.	at North Carolina Central*	O'Kelly–Riddick Stadium; Durham, NC	ESPN+	L 22–30	11,632
September 19	6:00 p.m.	at Campbell	Barker–Lane Stadium; Buies Creek, NC	FloSports	L 14–42	5,109
September 26	4:00 p.m.	No. 19 Rhode Island	Truist Stadium; Greensboro, NC	FloSports	W 22–18	11,336
October 3	6:00 p.m.	at Bryant	Beirne Stadium; Smithfield, RI	FloSports	L 30–31	2,048
October 10	12:00 p.m.	New Hampshire	Truist Stadium; Greensboro, NC	FloSports	W 30–27 ^{OT}	1,329
October 17	12:00 p.m.	Chicago State*	Truist Stadium; Greensboro, NC	FloSports	W 27–12	3,521
October 31	1:00 p.m.	Elon^{†}	Truist Stadium; Greensboro, NC	FloSports	W 13–10	22,401
November 7	12:00 p.m.	at No. 15 Monmouth	Kessler Field; West Long Branch, NJ	FloSports	L 17–21	2,763
November 14	1:00 p.m.	at Hampton	Armstrong Stadium; Hampton, VA	FloSports	W 41–14	5,192
November 21	12:00 p.m.	Albany	Truist Stadium; Greensboro, NC	FloSports	L 7–24	8,321
*Non-conference game; ^{†}Homecoming; Rankings from STATS Poll released prior to the game; All times are in Eastern time

== Game summaries ==
=== Morgan State ===
Morgan State Bears (0–0) at North Carolina A&T Aggies (0–0) – Game summary

Quarter	1	2	3	4	Total
Bears	0	3	0	14	17
Aggies	7	0	0	0	7

at Truist Stadium • Greensboro, North Carolina

- Date: August 29
- Game time: 6:00 p.m.
- Game weather: Cloudy • Temperature: 86 °F (30 °C) • Wind: E at 7 miles per hour (11 km/h)
- Game attendance: 16,264
- Referee: Alexander Randolph
- TV announcers (FloSports): Spencer Turkin, Damieon Banks and Reiven Douglas

Game information

First quarter

- NCAT – Braxton Thomas 2-yard run (Asher Holland kick), 3:08. Aggies 7–0. Drive: 17 plays, 70 yards, 9:33.

Second quarter

- MORG – Alex Amaya 25-yard field goal, 5:54. Aggies 7–3. Drive: 8 plays, 66 yards, 5:21.

Third quarter

- No scoring plays.

Fourth quarter

- MORG – Joseph Towler 68-yard pass from Cameron Edge (Gavin Fetty kick), 14:23. Bears 10–7. Drive: 3 plays, 80 yards, 0:53.
- MORG – Jordan Barnett 22-yard run (Alex Amaya kick), 1:03. Bears 17–7. Drive: 8 plays, 52 yards, 3:44.

Statistics	MORG	NCAT
First downs	12	19
Plays–yards	41–276	68–328
Rushes–yards	22–109	35–88
Passing yards	167	240
Passing: comp–att–int	13–19–1	20–33–0
Turnovers	1	0
Time of possession	24:19	35:41

Team	Category	Player	Statistics
Morgan State	Passing	Cameron Edge	13/19, 167 yards, TD, INT
Morgan State	Rushing	Jordan Barnett	12 carries, 114 yards, TD
Morgan State	Receiving	Joseph Towler	1 reception, 68 yards, TD
North Carolina A&T	Passing	Braxton Thomas	20/32, 240 yards
North Carolina A&T	Rushing	JT Smith	19 carries, 51 yards
North Carolina A&T	Receiving	Rory Jones-Amen-Hetep	2 receptions, 52 yards

=== at Georgia State (FBS) ===
North Carolina A&T Aggies (0–1) at Georgia State Panthers (FBS) (0–0) – Game summary

Quarter	1	2	3	4	Total
Aggies	0	7	0	3	10
Panthers (FBS)	14	21	24	0	59

at Center Parc Stadium • Atlanta, Georgia

- Date: September 4
- Game time: 7:00 p.m.
- Game weather: Sunny
- Game attendance: 16,703
- Referee: Marty Adams
- TV announcers (ESPN+): Matt Stewart and Sam Crenshaw

Game information

First quarter

- GAST – Dennis Murray Jr. 30-yard pass from Cameran Brown (Samer Layous kick), 7:17. Panthers 7–0. Drive: 1 play, 30 yards, 0:06.
- GAST – Lanear McCrary Jr. 8-yard run (Samer Layous kick), 0:00. Panthers 14–0. Drive: 11 plays, 90 yards, 5:04.

Second quarter

- GAST – Qwantavius Wiggins 2-yard run (Samer Layous kick), 7:00. Panthers 21–0. Drive: 11 plays, 70 yards, 5:38.
- NCAT – Anthony Rucker 61-yard pass from Kevin White (Asher Holland kick), 5:12. Panthers 21–7. Drive: 4 plays, 75 yards, 1:48.
- GAST – Dennis Murray Jr. 14-yard run (Samer Layous kick), 2:38. Panthers 28–7. Drive: 5 plays, 58 yards, 2:28.
- GAST – Jamari Miller 8-yard pass from Cameran Brown (Samer Layous kick), 0:19. Panthers 35–7. Drive: 7 plays, 61 yards, 1:16.

Third quarter

- GAST – Ayden Pereira 17-yard run (Samer Layous kick), 11:38. Panthers 42–7. Drive: 6 plays, 60 yards, 3:15.
- GAST – Samer Layous 26-yard field goal, 8:52. Panthers 45–7. Drive: 6 plays, 0 yards, 1:28.
- GAST – Savion Hart 41-yard run, 6:20. Panthers 52–7. Drive: 1 play, 41 yards, 0:27.
- GAST – Xavier Butler 20-yard run (Balint Vorosmarty kick), 1:42. Panthers 59–7. Drive: 7 plays, 55 yards, 3:11.

Fourth quarter

- NCAT – Asher Holland 39-yard field goal, 9:04. Panthers 59–10. Drive: 13 plays, 53 yards, 7:38.

Statistics	NCAT	GAST
First downs	10	28
Plays–yards	53–209	71–563
Rushes–yards	30–84	38–284
Passing yards	125	279
Passing: comp–att–int	11–23–0	25–33–0
Turnovers	0	0
Time of possession	27:14	32:46

Team	Category	Player	Statistics
North Carolina A&T	Passing	Kevin White	9/20, 122 yards, TD
North Carolina A&T	Rushing	J.T. Smith	11 carries, 44 yards
North Carolina A&T	Receiving	Anthony Rucker	4 receptions, 80 yards, TD
Georgia State	Passing	Cameran Brown	15/20, 190 yards, 2 TD
Georgia State	Rushing	Lanear McCrary Jr.	9 carries, 75 yards, TD
Georgia State	Receiving	Dennis Murray Jr.	2 receptions, 50 yards, TD

=== at North Carolina Central (rivalry) ===
North Carolina A&T Aggies (0–2) at North Carolina Central Eagles (1–1) – Game summary

Quarter	1	2	3	4	Total
Aggies	0	0	0	0	0
Eagles	0	0	0	0	0

at O'Kelly–Riddick Stadium • Durham, North Carolina

- Date: September 12
- Game time: 6:00 p.m.
- TV: ESPN+

Game information

First quarter
Second quarter
Third quarter
Fourth quarter

Statistics	NCAT	NCCU
First downs		
Plays–yards		
Rushes–yards		
Passing yards		
Passing: comp–att–int		
Turnovers		
Time of possession		

Team	Category	Player	Statistics
North Carolina A&T	Passing		
North Carolina A&T	Rushing		
North Carolina A&T	Receiving		
North Carolina Central	Passing		
North Carolina Central	Rushing		
North Carolina Central	Receiving		

=== at Campbell ===
North Carolina A&T Aggies (0–3) at Campbell Fighting Camels (2–1) – Game summary

Quarter	1	2	3	4	Total
Aggies	0	0	0	0	0
Fighting Camels	0	0	0	0	0

at Barker–Lane Stadium • Buies Creek, North Carolina

- Date: September 19
- Game time: 6:00 p.m.
- TV: FloFootball

Game information

First quarter
Second quarter
Third quarter
Fourth quarter

Statistics	NCAT	CAM
First downs		
Plays–yards		
Rushes–yards		
Passing yards		
Passing: comp–att–int		
Turnovers		
Time of possession		

Team	Category	Player	Statistics
North Carolina A&T	Passing		
North Carolina A&T	Rushing		
North Carolina A&T	Receiving		
Campbell	Passing		
Campbell	Rushing		
Campbell	Receiving		

=== No. 19 Rhode Island ===
No. 19 Rhode Island Rams (2–2) at North Carolina A&T Aggies (0–4) – Game summary

Quarter	1	2	3	4	Total
No. 19 Rams	0	0	0	0	0
Aggies	0	0	0	0	0

at Truist Stadium • Greensboro, North Carolina

- Date: September 26
- Game time: 4:00 p.m.

Game information

First quarter
Second quarter
Third quarter
Fourth quarter

Statistics	URI	NCAT
First downs		
Plays–yards		
Rushes–yards		
Passing yards		
Passing: comp–att–int		
Turnovers		
Time of possession		

Team	Category	Player	Statistics
Rhode Island	Passing		
Rhode Island	Rushing		
Rhode Island	Receiving		
North Carolina A&T	Passing		
North Carolina A&T	Rushing		
North Carolina A&T	Receiving		

=== at Bryant ===
North Carolina A&T Aggies (1–4) at Bryant Bulldogs (3–1) – Game summary

Quarter	1	2	3	4	Total
Aggies	0	0	0	0	0
Bulldogs	0	0	0	0	0

at Beirne Stadium • Smithfield, Rhode Island

- Date: October 3
- Game time: 1:00 p.m.

Game information

First quarter
Second quarter
Third quarter
Fourth quarter

Statistics	NCAT	BRY
First downs		
Plays–yards		
Rushes–yards		
Passing yards		
Passing: comp–att–int		
Turnovers		
Time of possession		

Team	Category	Player	Statistics
North Carolina A&T	Passing		
North Carolina A&T	Rushing		
North Carolina A&T	Receiving		
Bryant	Passing		
Bryant	Rushing		
Bryant	Receiving		

=== New Hampshire ===
New Hampshire Wildcats (2–4) at North Carolina A&T Aggies (1–5) – Game summary

Quarter	1	2	3	4	Total
Wildcats	0	0	0	0	0
Aggies	0	0	0	0	0

at Truist Stadium • Greensboro, North Carolina

- Date: October 10
- Game time: 12:00 p.m.

Game information

First quarter
Second quarter
Third quarter
Fourth quarter

Statistics	UNH	NCAT
First downs		
Plays–yards		
Rushes–yards		
Passing yards		
Passing: comp–att–int		
Turnovers		
Time of possession		

Team	Category	Player	Statistics
New Hampshire	Passing		
New Hampshire	Rushing		
New Hampshire	Receiving		
North Carolina A&T	Passing		
North Carolina A&T	Rushing		
North Carolina A&T	Receiving		

=== Chicago State ===
Chicago State Cougars (1–5) at North Caroina A&T Aggies (2–5) – Game summary

Quarter	1	2	3	4	Total
Cougars	0	0	0	0	0
Aggies	0	0	0	0	0

at Truist Stadium • Greensboro, North Carolina

- Date: October 17
- Game time: 12:00 p.m.

Game information

First quarter
Second quarter
Third quarter
Fourth quarter

Statistics	CHST	NCAT
First downs		
Plays–yards		
Rushes–yards		
Passing yards		
Passing: comp–att–int		
Turnovers		
Time of possession		

Team	Category	Player	Statistics
Chicago State	Passing		
Chicago State	Rushing		
Chicago State	Receiving		
North Carolina A&T	Passing		
North Carolina A&T	Rushing		
North Carolina A&T	Receiving		

=== Elon ===
Elon Phoenix (4–4) at North Carolina A&T Aggies (3–5) – Game summary

Quarter	1	2	3	4	Total
Phoenix	0	0	0	0	0
Aggies	0	0	0	0	0

at Truist Stadium • Greensboro, North Carolina

- Date: October 31
- Game time: 1:00 p.m.

Game information

First quarter
Second quarter
Third quarter
Fourth quarter

Statistics	ELON	NCAT
First downs		
Plays–yards		
Rushes–yards		
Passing yards		
Passing: comp–att–int		
Turnovers		
Time of possession		

Team	Category	Player	Statistics
Elon	Passing		
Elon	Rushing		
Elon	Receiving		
North Carolina A&T	Passing		
North Carolina A&T	Rushing		
North Carolina A&T	Receiving		

=== at No. 15 Monmouth ===
North Carolina A&T Aggies (4–5) at No. 15 Monmouth Hawks (7–2) – Game summary

Quarter	1	2	3	4	Total
Aggies	0	0	0	0	0
No. 15 Hawks	0	0	0	0	0

at Kessler Stadium • West Long Branch, New Jersey

- Date: November 7
- Game time: 12:00 p.m.

Game information

First quarter
Second quarter
Third quarter
Fourth quarter

Statistics	NCAT	MONM
First downs		
Plays–yards		
Rushes–yards		
Passing yards		
Passing: comp–att–int		
Turnovers		
Time of possession		

Team	Category	Player	Statistics
North Carolina A&T	Passing		
North Carolina A&T	Rushing		
North Carolina A&T	Receiving		
Monmouth	Passing		
Monmouth	Rushing		
Monmouth	Receiving		

=== at Hampton ===
North Carolina A&T Aggies (4–6) at Hampton Pirates (1–9) – Game summary

Quarter	1	2	3	4	Total
Aggies	0	0	0	0	0
Pirates	0	0	0	0	0

at Armstrong Stadium • Hampton, Virginia

- Date: November 14
- Game time: 1:00 PM

Game information

First quarter
Second quarter
Third quarter
Fourth quarter

Statistics	NCAT	HAMP
First downs		
Plays–yards		
Rushes–yards		
Passing yards		
Passing: Comp–Att–Int		
Turnovers		
Time of possession		

Team	Category	Player	Statistics
North Carolina A&T	Passing		
North Carolina A&T	Rushing		
North Carolina A&T	Receiving		
Hampton	Passing		
Hampton	Rushing		
Hampton	Receiving		

=== Albany ===
Albany Great Danes (7–4) at North Carolina A&T Aggies (5–6) – Game summary

Quarter	1	2	3	4	Total
Great Danes	0	0	0	0	0
Aggies	0	0	0	0	0

at Truist Stadium • Greensboro, North Carolina

- Date: November 21
- Game time: 12:00 p.m.

Game information

First quarter
Second quarter
Third quarter
Fourth quarter

Statistics	ALB	NCAT
First downs		
Plays–yards		
Rushes–yards		
Passing yards		
Passing: comp–att–int		
Turnovers		
Time of possession		

Team	Category	Player	Statistics
Albany	Passing		
Albany	Rushing		
Albany	Receiving		
North Carolina A&T	Passing		
North Carolina A&T	Rushing		
North Carolina A&T	Receiving		
