= 2026 Rhode Island Rams football team =

American college football season

2026 Rhode Island Rams football
- Conference: CAA Football
- Record: 5–7 (2–6 CAA)
- Head coach: Jim Fleming (13th season)
- Offensive coordinator: Mike Flanagan (2nd season)
- Defensive coordinator: Chris Lorenti (4th season)
- Home stadium: Centreville Bank Stadium

2026 Coastal Athletic Association Football Conference standings
	Conf.			Overall
Team	W		L	W		L
No. 18 Monmouth $^	7	–	0	8	–	3
No. 22 Campbell	5	–	2	8	–	3
Albany	5	–	2	7	–	4
Bryant	5	–	2	7	–	4
North Carolina A&T	4	–	3	5	–	6
Elon	4	–	3	6	–	5
Sacred Heart	4	–	4	4	–	6
Stony Brook	3	–	4	5	–	6
New Hampshire	3	–	4	4	–	7
Towson	3	–	4	3	–	8
Rhode Island	2	–	5	5	–	6
Maine	1	–	6	1	–	9
Hampton	0	–	7	1	–	10
$ – Conference champion; ^ – FCS playoff participant; As of November 22, 2026; Rankings from STATS Poll

The 2026 Rhode Island Rams football team represents the University of Rhode Island as a member of the Coastal Athletic Association Football Conference (CAA Football) during the 2026 NCAA Division I FCS football season. The Rams are led by 13th-year head coach Jim Fleming and will play their home games at Centreville Bank Stadium in Pawtucket, Rhode Island due to renovations to Meade Stadium.

== Schedule ==
Date	Time	Opponent	Rank	Site	TV	Result	Attendance
August 28	7:00 p.m.	at Merrimack*	No. 7	Duane Stadium; North Andover, MA	ESPN+	W 34–7	4,175
September 5	2:00 p.m.	at Temple*	No. 6	Lincoln Financial Field; Philadelphia, PA	ESPN+	L 14–38	13,484
September 12	12:00 p.m.	Elon	No. 8	Centreville Bank Stadium; Pawtucket, RI	FloFootball	W 31–10	4,306
September 19	2:30 p.m.	at Stony Brook	No. 8	Kenneth P. LaValle Stadium; Stony Brook, NY	FloFootball	L 24–56	5,632
September 26	4:00 p.m.	at North Carolina A&T	No. 19	Truist Stadium; Greensboro, NC	FloFootball	L 18–22	11,336
October 3	12:00 p.m.	Brown*		Centreville Bank Stadium; Pawtucket, RI (rivalry)	FloFootball	W 13–10	5,368
October 17	12:00 p.m.	at No. 25 Yale*		Yale Bowl; New Haven, CT	ESPN+	W 41–23	4,315
October 24	12:00 p.m.	Albany		Centreville Bank Stadium; Pawtucket, RI	FloFootball	L 21–38	4,033
October 31	12:00 p.m.	Maine		Centreville Bank Stadium; Pawtucket, RI	FloFootball	W 14–13 ^{OT}	3,056
November 7	1:00 p.m.	at New Hampshire		Wildcat Stadium; Durham, NH	FloFootball	L 21–24	3,906
November 14	12:00 p.m.	Towson		Centreville Bank Stadium; Pawtucket, RI	FloFootball	L 16–19 ^{OT}	3,378
November 21	1:00 p.m.	at Bryant		Beirne Stadium; Smithfield, RI	FloFootball	L 7–28	2,500
*Non-conference game; Rankings from STATS Poll released prior to the game; All times are in Eastern time

== Game summaries ==
=== at Merrimack ===
No. 7 Rhode Island Rams (0–0) at Merrimack Warriors (0–0) – Game summary

Quarter	1	2	3	4	Total
No. 7 Rams	7	14	6	7	34
Warriors	7	0	0	0	7

at Duane Stadium • North Andover, Massachusetts

- Date: August 28
- Game time: 6:00 p.m.
- Game weather: Cloudy • Temperature: 84 °F (29 °C)
- Game attendance: 4,175
- Referee: John Smith
- TV announcers (ESPN+): John Avino, Jacob van Ryn and Isaiah Voegeli

Game information

First quarter

- URI – Marquis Buchanan 16-yard pass from Tyler Budge (Ty Groff kick), 13:11. Rams 7–0. Drive: 2 plays, 18 yards, 0:37.
- MRMK – Matthias Latham 2-yard run (Guytano Bartolomeo kick), 5:15. Tied 7–7. Drive: 8 plays, 59 yards, 3:56.

Second quarter

- URI – Alex McClelland 5-yard run (Ty Groff kick), 7:59. Rams 14–7. Drive: 9 plays, 80 yards, 3:24.
- URI – Alex McClelland 4-yard run (Ty Groff kick), 0:50. Rams 21–7. Drive: 11 plays, 70 yards, 2:14.

Third quarter

- URI – Ty Groff 26-yard field goal, 9:18. Rams 24–7. Drive: 9 plays, 52 yards, 4:40.
- URI – Ty Groff 33-yard field goal, 7:48. Rams 27–7. Drive: 4 plays, 4 yards, 0:24.

Fourth quarter

- URI – Moses Meus 49-yard interception return (Ty Groff kick), 0:45. Rams 34–7.

Statistics	URI	MRMK
First downs	18	20
Plays–yards	61–297	74–355
Rushes–yards	30–169	34–94
Passing yards	128	261
Passing: comp–att–int	13–31–0	24–40–2
Turnovers	0	4
Time of possession	23:59	36:01

Team	Category	Player	Statistics
Rhode Island	Passing	Tyler Budge	13/29, 128 yards, TD
Rhode Island	Rushing	Brendon Barrow	13 carries, 56 yards
Rhode Island	Receiving	Marquis Buchanan	6 receptions, 72 yards, TD
Merrimack	Passing	AJ Hairston Jr.	12/23, 145 yards, INT
Merrimack	Rushing	DeMarcus McElroy	10 carries, 45 yards
Merrimack	Receiving	Bryce Goulet	4 receptions, 67 yards

=== at Temple (FBS) ===
No. 6 Rhode Island Rams (1–0) at Temple Owls (FBS) (0–0) – Game summary

Quarter	1	2	3	4	Total
No. 6 Rams	7	7	0	0	14
Owls (FBS)	10	14	7	7	38

at Lincoln Financial Field • Philadelphia, Pennsylvania

- Date: September 5
- Game time: 2:00 p.m.
- Game weather: Cloudy • Temperature: 80 °F (27 °C)
- Game attendance: 13,484
- Referee: Reid Jackson
- TV announcers (ESPN+): Joe Tordy and Jay Sonnhalter

Game information

First quarter

- TEM – Jayce Freeman 18-yard pass from Jaxon Smolik (Carl Hardin kick), 12:29. Owls 7–0. Drive: 5 plays, 75 yards, 2:31.
- URI – Marquis Buchanan 35-yard pass from Tyler Budge (Ty Groff kick), 9:31. Tied 7–7. Drive: 6 plays, 75 yards, 2:58.
- TEM – Carl Hardin 33-yard field goal, 5:28. Owls 10–7. Drive: 8 plays, 59 yards, 4:03.

Second quarter

- TEM – Jamarcus Pierre 35-yard interception return (Carl Hardin kick), 9:20. Owls 17–7.
- URI – Tyler Budge 1-yard run (Ty Groff kick), 2:22. Owls 17–14. Drive: 14 plays, 75 yards, 6:58.
- TEM – Keveun Mason 1-yard run (Carl Hardin kick), 0:16. Owls 24–14. Drive: 7 plays, 75 yards, 2:06.

Third quarter

- TEM – Keveun Mason 3-yard run (Carl Hardin kick), 1:05. Owls 31–14. Drive: 17 plays, 82 yards, 8:16.

Fourth quarter

- TEM – Tyree Alualu 63-yard interception return (Carl Hardin kick), 8:53. Owls 38–14.

Statistics	URI	TEM
First downs	15	19
Plays–yards	61–292	61–369
Rushes–yards	30–97	45–227
Passing yards	195	142
Passing: comp–att–int	18–31–2	9–16–0
Turnovers	3	1
Time of possession	29:06	30:54

Team	Category	Player	Statistics
Rhode Island	Passing	Tyler Budge	18/31, 195 yards, TD, 2 INT
Rhode Island	Rushing	Brendon Barrow	11 carries, 39 yards
Rhode Island	Receiving	Marquis Buchanan	10 receptions, 137 yards, TD
Temple	Passing	Ajani Sheppard	5/10, 85 yards
Temple	Rushing	Keveun Mason	20 carries, 158 yards, 2 TD
Temple	Receiving	Colin Chase	3 receptions, 43 yards

=== Elon ===
Elon Phoenix (2–0) at No. 8 Rhode Island Rams (1–1) – Game summary

Quarter	1	2	3	4	Total
Phoenix	0	0	0	0	0
No. 8 Rams	0	0	0	0	0

at Centreville Bank Stadium • Pawtucket, Rhode Island

- Date: September 12
- Game time: 12:00 p.m.
- TV: FloFootball

Game information

First quarter
Second quarter
Third quarter
Fourth quarter

Statistics	ELON	URI
First downs		
Plays–yards		
Rushes–yards		
Passing yards		
Passing: comp–att–int		
Turnovers		
Time of possession		

Team	Category	Player	Statistics
Elon	Passing		
Elon	Rushing		
Elon	Receiving		
Rhode Island	Passing		
Rhode Island	Rushing		
Rhode Island	Receiving		

=== at Stony Brook ===
No. 8 Rhode Island Rams (2–1) at Stony Brook Seawolves (1–2) – Game summary

Quarter	1	2	3	4	Total
No. 8 Rams	0	0	0	0	0
Seawolves	0	0	0	0	0

at Kenneth P. LaValle Stadium • Stony Brook, New York

- Date: September 19
- Game time: 2:30 p.m.
- TV: FloFootball

Game information

First quarter
Second quarter
Third quarter
Fourth quarter

Statistics	URI	STBK
First downs		
Plays–yards		
Rushes–yards		
Passing yards		
Passing: comp–att–int		
Turnovers		
Time of possession		

Team	Category	Player	Statistics
Rhode Island	Passing		
Rhode Island	Rushing		
Rhode Island	Receiving		
Stony Brook	Passing		
Stony Brook	Rushing		
Stony Brook	Receiving		

=== at North Carolina A&T ===
No. 19 Rhode Island Rams (2–2) at North Carolina A&T Aggies (0–4) – Game summary

Quarter	1	2	3	4	Total
No. 19 Rams	0	0	0	0	0
Aggies	0	0	0	0	0

at Truist Stadium • Greensboro, North Carolina

- Date: September 26
- Game time: 4:00 p.m.

Game information

First quarter
Second quarter
Third quarter
Fourth quarter

Statistics	URI	NCAT
First downs		
Plays–yards		
Rushes–yards		
Passing yards		
Passing: comp–att–int		
Turnovers		
Time of possession		

Team	Category	Player	Statistics
Rhode Island	Passing		
Rhode Island	Rushing		
Rhode Island	Receiving		
North Carolina A&T	Passing		
North Carolina A&T	Rushing		
North Carolina A&T	Receiving		

=== Brown (rivalry) ===
Brown Bears (1–1) at Rhode Island Rams (2–3) – Game summary

Quarter	1	2	3	4	Total
Bears	0	0	3	7	10
Rams	0	3	0	10	13

at Centreville Bank Stadium • Pawtucket, Rhode Island

- Date: October 3
- Game time: 12:00 p.m.
- Game weather: Sunny
- Game attendance: 5,368
- Referee: Bill McKeever
- TV: FloFootball

Game information

First quarter

No scoring plays

Second quarter

- URI – Ty Groff 43-yard field goal, 0:18. Rams 3–0. Drive: 8 plays, 52 yards, 2:16.

Third quarter

- BRWN – Drew Crabtree 33-yard field goal, 3:11. Tied 3–3. Drive: 14 plays, 78 yards, 5:07.

Fourth quarter

- BRWN – Qwentin Brown 1-yard run (Drew Crabtree kick), 13:29. Bears 10–3. Drive: 5 plays, 13 yards, 1:33.
- URI – Alex McClelland 12-yard run (Ty Groff kick), 12:05. Tied 10–10. Drive: 3 plays, 82 yards, 1:24.
- URI – Ty Groff 43-yard field goal, 0:11. Rams 13–10. Drive: 5 plays, 20 yards, 0:21.

Statistics	BRWN	URI
First downs	14	19
Plays–yards	63–306	76–374
Rushes–yards	26–35	50–217
Passing yards	271	157
Passing: comp–att–int	21–37–1	16–26–1
Turnovers	1	3
Time of possession	26:21	33:39

Team	Category	Player	Statistics
Brown	Passing	James Murphy	21/37, 271 yards, INT
Brown	Rushing	Matt Childs	13 carries, 37 yards
Brown	Receiving	Jadon Garza-Pender	3 receptions, 66 yards
Rhode Island	Passing	Alex McClelland	6/11, 83 yards
Rhode Island	Rushing	Gabe Winowich	23 carries, 85 yards
Rhode Island	Receiving	Marquis Buchanan	5 receptions, 90 yards

=== at No. 25 Yale ===
Rhode Island Rams (3–3) at No. 25 Yale Bulldogs (3–1) – Game summary

Quarter	1	2	3	4	Total
Rams	0	0	0	0	0
No. 25 Bulldogs	0	0	0	0	0

at Yale Bowl • New Haven, Connecticut

- Date: October 17
- Game time: 12:00 p.m.

Game information

First quarter
Second quarter
Third quarter
Fourth quarter

Statistics	URI	YALE
First downs		
Plays–yards		
Rushes–yards		
Passing yards		
Passing: comp–att–int		
Turnovers		
Time of possession		

Team	Category	Player	Statistics
Rhode Island	Passing		
Rhode Island	Rushing		
Rhode Island	Receiving		
Yale	Passing		
Yale	Rushing		
Yale	Receiving		

=== Albany ===
Albany Great Danes (4–3) at Rhode Island Rams (4–3) – Game summary

Quarter	1	2	3	4	Total
Great Danes	0	0	0	0	0
Rams	0	0	0	0	0

at Centreville Bank Stadium • Pawtucket, Rhode Island

- Date: October 24
- Game time: 12:00 p.m.

Game information

First quarter
Second quarter
Third quarter
Fourth quarter

Statistics	ALB	URI
First downs		
Plays–yards		
Rushes–yards		
Passing yards		
Passing: comp–att–int		
Turnovers		
Time of possession		

Team	Category	Player	Statistics
Albany	Passing		
Albany	Rushing		
Albany	Receiving		
Rhode Island	Passing		
Rhode Island	Rushing		
Rhode Island	Receiving		

=== Maine ===
Maine Black Bears (1–7) at Rhode Island Rams (4–4) – Game summary

Quarter	1	2	3	4	Total
Black Bears	0	0	0	0	0
Rams	0	0	0	0	0

at Centreville Bank Stadium • Pawtucket, Rhode Island

- Date: October 31
- Game time: 12:00 p.m.

Game information

First quarter
Second quarter
Third quarter
Fourth quarter

Statistics	ME	URI
First downs		
Plays–yards		
Rushes–yards		
Passing yards		
Passing: comp–att–int		
Turnovers		
Time of possession		

Team	Category	Player	Statistics
Maine	Passing		
Maine	Rushing		
Maine	Receiving		
Rhode Island	Passing		
Rhode Island	Rushing		
Rhode Island	Receiving		

=== at New Hampshire ===
Rhode Island Rams (5–4) at New Hampshire Wildcats (2–7) – Game summary

Quarter	1	2	3	4	Total
Rams	0	0	0	0	0
Wildcats	0	0	0	0	0

at Wildcat Stadium • Durham, New Hampshire

- Date: November 7
- Game time: 1:00 p.m.

Game information

First quarter
Second quarter
Third quarter
Fourth quarter

Statistics	URI	UNH
First downs		
Plays–yards		
Rushes–yards		
Passing yards		
Passing: comp–att–int		
Turnovers		
Time of possession		

Team	Category	Player	Statistics
Rhode Island	Passing		
Rhode Island	Rushing		
Rhode Island	Receiving		
New Hampshire	Passing		
New Hampshire	Rushing		
New Hampshire	Receiving		

=== Towson ===
Towson Tigers (2–8) at Rhode Island Rams (5–5) – Game summary

Quarter	1	2	3	4	Total
Tigers	0	0	0	0	0
Rams	0	0	0	0	0

at Centreville Bank Stadium • Pawtucket, Rhode Island

- Date: November 14
- Game time: 12:00 p.m.

Game information

First quarter
Second quarter
Third quarter
Fourth quarter

Statistics	TOW	URI
First downs		
Plays–yards		
Rushes–yards		
Passing yards		
Passing: comp–att–int		
Turnovers		
Time of possession		

Team	Category	Player	Statistics
Towson	Passing		
Towson	Rushing		
Towson	Receiving		
Rhode Island	Passing		
Rhode Island	Rushing		
Rhode Island	Receiving		

=== at Bryant ===
Rhode Island Rams (5–6) at Bryant Bulldogs (7–4) – Game summary

Quarter	1	2	3	4	Total
Rams	0	0	0	0	0
Bulldogs	0	0	0	0	0

at Beirne Stadium • Smithfield, Rhode Island

- Date: November 21
- Game time: 1:00 p.m.

Game information

First quarter
Second quarter
Third quarter
Fourth quarter

Statistics	URI	BRY
First downs		
Plays–yards		
Rushes–yards		
Passing yards		
Passing: comp–att–int		
Turnovers		
Time of possession		

Team	Category	Player	Statistics
Rhode Island	Passing		
Rhode Island	Rushing		
Rhode Island	Receiving		
Bryant	Passing		
Bryant	Rushing		
Bryant	Receiving		

== Rankings ==
Ranking movements Legend: ██ Increase in ranking ██ Decrease in ranking RV = Received votes
	Week														
Poll	Pre	1	2	3	4	5	6	7	8	9	10	11	12	13	Final
STATS	7	6	8	8	19	RV									
Coaches	8	8	13	13	21	RV									
