= Caito =

Caito is an Italian surname. Notable people with the surname include:

- Nicolas Caito (born 1969), French patternmaker
- Tom Caito, American football coach

== See also ==
- Cato (disambiguation)
