= Londone Myers =

American fashion model from Georgia

- Born: Lawrenceville, Georgia, U.S.
- Modeling information
- Height: 1.76 m (5 ft 9 1/2 in)
- Hair color: Brown
- Eye color: Brown
- Agency: Heroes Model Management (New York); Next Management (London, Paris); Blow Models (Barcelona); Monster Management (Milan)

Londone Myers is an American fashion model. She debuted as a Saint Laurent exclusive in 2016.

== Early life ==
Myers was born and raised in the state of Georgia. Before modeling, she briefly worked in postmortem examination in Washington, D.C. She is of Cameroonian and Irish descent.

== Career ==
Myers debuted as a Saint Laurent exclusive as well as walking for Kanye West's S/S 2016 Yeezy show. Vogue chose her as a model to watch in 2016. That season, she also walked the runway for Marc Jacobs, Chloé, Alexander Wang, Altuzarra, Rodarte, Stella McCartney, and Chanel among others. She appeared in the March issue of Elle in a solo editorial set in Los Angeles, California. She has also appeared in Vogue España, Vogue Polska, and on the cover of Wonderland. She has appeared in campaigns for Gap Inc., Tommy Hilfiger, and Prada.
