= 2026 Merrimack Warriors football team =

College football season

2026 Merrimack Warriors football
- Conference: Independent
- Record: 5–7
- Head coach: Mike Gennetti (3rd season)
- Offensive coordinator: Aynsley Rosenbaum (4th season)
- Home stadium: Duane Stadium

2026 NCAA Division I FCS independents football standings
	Conf.			Overall
Team	W		L	W		L
Merrimack		–		5	–	7
Chicago State		–		3	–	8

The 2026 Merrimack Warriors football team represented Merrimack College as an independent during the 2026 NCAA Division I FCS football season. The Warriors were led by third-year head coach Mike Gennetti and played their home games at Duane Stadium in North Andover, Massachusetts.

== Transfers ==
=== Outgoing ===
Player	Position	Destination
Ayden Pereira	QB	Georgia State
Brendon Wyatt	RB	NC Central
Seth Sweitzer	WR	Stony Brook
Cade Callahan	TE	ULM
Steve Lizama	OL	ETSU
Carlton Thai	K	Carleton (U Sports - Canada)
RJ Chapman	DB	NM State
Cidney Johnson	DL	WIU
Nasir Maryland	DB	EIU

=== Incoming ===
Player	Position	Previous School
AJ Hairston	QB	UMass
Jake Petrow	TE	Illinois
Guytano Bartolomeo	K	UNC Chapel Hill
Kenyon Massey	WR	UMass
Ethan Crite	WR	Austin Peay
Chris Leonardo	OL	Marist
Emmanuel Dankwa	EDGE	URI
Micah Green	LB	Dartmouth

== Schedule ==
Date	Time	Opponent	Site	TV	Result	Attendance
August 28	6:00 p.m.	No. 7 Rhode Island	Duane Stadium; North Andover, MA	ESPN+	L 7–34	4,175
September 3	7:00 p.m.	at Delaware	Delaware Stadium; Newark, DE	ESPN+	L 7–42	17,268
September 12	5:00 p.m.	at Maine	Alfond Sports Stadium; Orono, ME	FloSports	W 23–14	5,065
September 19	7:00 p.m.	at No. 4 Tarleton State	Memorial Stadium; Stephenville, TX	ESPN+	L 20–45	24,612
September 26	1:00 p.m.	New Haven^{†}	Duane Stadium; North Andover, MA	ESPN+	W 17–10	3,592
October 3	12:00 p.m.	at Yale	Yale Bowl; New Haven, CT	ESPN+	L 24–41	4,022
October 17	1:30 p.m.	at Dartmouth	Memorial Field; Hanover, NH	ESPN+	L 21–27	2,660
October 24	12:00 p.m.	New Hampshire	Duane Stadium; North Andover, MA	ESPN+	W 24–17	4,491
October 31	12:00 p.m.	Wagner	Duane Stadium; North Andover, MA	ESPN+	W 19–14	1,245
November 7	3:30 p.m.	at No. 16 (FBS) Wake Forest	Allegacy Federal Credit Union Stadium; Winston-Salem, NC	ACCN	L 0–77	28,098
November 14	12:00 p.m.	at No. 14 Monmouth	Kessler Stadium; West Long Branch, NJ	FloSports	W 29–28	2,464
November 21	12:00 p.m.	Sacred Heart	Duane Stadium; North Andover, MA	ESPN+	L 10–35	1,711
^{†}Homecoming; Rankings from STATS Poll released prior to the game; All times are in Eastern time; Source:

== Game summaries ==
=== No. 7 Rhode Island ===
No. 7 Rhode Island Rams (0–0) at Merrimack Warriors (0–0) – Game summary

Quarter	1	2	3	4	Total
No. 7 Rams	7	14	6	7	34
Warriors	7	0	0	0	7

at Duane Stadium • North Andover, Massachusetts

- Date: August 28
- Game time: 6:00 p.m.
- Game weather: Cloudy • Temperature: 84 °F (29 °C)
- Game attendance: 4,175
- Referee: John Smith
- TV announcers (ESPN+): John Avino, Jacob van Ryn and Isaiah Voegeli

Game information

First quarter

- URI – Marquis Buchanan 16-yard pass from Tyler Budge (Ty Groff kick), 13:11. Rams 7–0. Drive: 2 plays, 18 yards, 0:37.
- MRMK – Matthias Latham 2-yard run (Guytano Bartolomeo kick), 5:15. Tied 7–7. Drive: 8 plays, 59 yards, 3:56.

Second quarter

- URI – Alex McClelland 5-yard run (Ty Groff kick), 7:59. Rams 14–7. Drive: 9 plays, 80 yards, 3:24.
- URI – Alex McClelland 4-yard run (Ty Groff kick), 0:50. Rams 21–7. Drive: 11 plays, 70 yards, 2:14.

Third quarter

- URI – Ty Groff 26-yard field goal, 9:18. Rams 24–7. Drive: 9 plays, 52 yards, 4:40.
- URI – Ty Groff 33-yard field goal, 7:48. Rams 27–7. Drive: 4 plays, 4 yards, 0:24.

Fourth quarter

- URI – Moses Meus 49-yard interception return (Ty Groff kick), 0:45. Rams 34–7.

Statistics	URI	MRMK
First downs	18	20
Plays–yards	61–297	74–355
Rushes–yards	30–169	34–94
Passing yards	128	261
Passing: comp–att–int	13–31–0	24–40–2
Turnovers	0	4
Time of possession	23:59	36:01

Team	Category	Player	Statistics
Rhode Island	Passing	Tyler Budge	13/29, 128 yards, TD
Rhode Island	Rushing	BJ Barrow	13 carries, 56 yards
Rhode Island	Receiving	Marquis Buchanan	6 receptions, 72 yards, TD
Merrimack	Passing	AJ Hairston Jr.	12/23, 145 yards, INT
Merrimack	Rushing	DeMarcus McElroy	10 carries, 45 yards
Merrimack	Receiving	Bryce Goulet	4 receptions, 67 yards

=== at Delaware (FBS) ===
Merrimack Warriors (0–1) at Delaware Fightin' Blue Hens (FBS) (0–0) – Game summary

Quarter	1	2	3	4	Total
Warriors	0	0	7	0	7
Fightin' Blue Hens (FBS)	7	14	14	7	42

at Delaware Stadium • Newark, Delaware

- Date: September 3
- Game time: 7:00 p.m.
- Game weather: Sunny
- Game attendance: 17,268
- Referee: Douglas Mercer
- TV announcers (ESPN+): Scott Klatzkin and Pat Devlin

Game information

First quarter

- DEL – Viron Ellison Jr. 11-yard run (Tucker Smack kick), 7:35. Fightin' Blue Hens 7–0. Drive: 9 plays, 50 yards, 4:06.

Second quarter

- DEL – Nick Minicucci 12-yard run (Tucker Smack kick), 3:55. Fightin' Blue Hens 14–0. Drive: 6 plays, 80 yards, 1:48.
- DEL – Sean Wilson 12-yard pass from Nick Minicucci (Tucker Smack kick), 0:16. Fightin' Blue Hens 21–0. Drive: 1 play, 12 yards, 0:07.

Third quarter

- DEL – Kaderris Roberts 1-yard run (Tucker Smack kick), 10:35. Fightin' Blue Hens 28–0. Drive: 11 plays, 83 yards, 4:21.
- DEL – Kaderris Roberts 75-yard pass from Viron Ellison Jr. (Tucker Smack kick), 9:11. Fightin' Blue Hens 35–0. Drive: 1 play, 75 yards, 0:13.
- Galamama Mulbah 7-yard run (Guytano Bartolomeo kick), 0:58. Fightin' Blue Hens 35–7. Drive: 4 plays, 30 yards, 1:17.

Fourth quarter

- DEL – Nick Tyree 8-yard pass from Nick Minicucci (Tucker Smack kick), 14:48. Fightin' Blue Hens 42–7. Drive: 5 plays, 72 yards, 1:05.

Statistics	MRMK	DEL
First downs	13	27
Plays–yards	70–244	73–547
Rushes–yards	25–48	29–112
Passing yards	196	435
Passing: comp–att–int	21–45–1	24–44–1
Turnovers	2	1
Time of possession	31:49	27:18

Team	Category	Player	Statistics
Merrimack	Passing	Cole Meehan	10/25, 121 yards
Merrimack	Rushing	Galamama Mulbah	7 carries, 41 yards, TD
Merrimack	Receiving	Matthias Latham	3 receptions, 36 yards
Delaware	Passing	Nick Minicucci	20/36, 330 yards, 2 TD, INT
Delaware	Rushing	Nakeem Powell	5 carries, 35 yards
Delaware	Receiving	Kaderris Roberts	2 receptions, 80 yards, TD

=== at Maine ===
Merrimack Warriors (0–2) at Maine Black Bears (1–1) – Game summary

Quarter	1	2	3	4	Total
Warriors	0	0	0	0	0
Black Bears	0	0	0	0	0

at Alfond Sports Stadium • Orono, Maine

- Date: September 12
- Game time: 5:00 p.m.

Game information

First quarter
Second quarter
Third quarter
Fourth quarter

Statistics	MRMK	ME
First downs		
Plays–yards		
Rushes–yards		
Passing yards		
Passing: comp–att–int		
Turnovers		
Time of possession		

Team	Category	Player	Statistics
Merrimack	Passing		
Merrimack	Rushing		
Merrimack	Receiving		
Maine	Passing		
Maine	Rushing		
Maine	Receiving		

=== at No. 4 Tarleton State ===
Merrimack Warriors (1–2) at No. 4 Tarleton State Texans (3–0) – Game summary

Quarter	1	2	3	4	Total
Warriors	0	0	0	0	0
No. 4 Texans	0	0	0	0	0

at Memorial Stadium • Stephenville, Texas

- Date: September 19
- Game time: 7:00 p.m.

Game information

First quarter
Second quarter
Third quarter
Fourth quarter

Statistics	MRMK	TAR
First downs		
Plays–yards		
Rushes–yards		
Passing yards		
Passing: comp–att–int		
Turnovers		
Time of possession		

Team	Category	Player	Statistics
Merrimack	Passing		
Merrimack	Rushing		
Merrimack	Receiving		
Tarleton State	Passing		
Tarleton State	Rushing		
Tarleton State	Receiving		

=== New Haven ===
New Haven Chargers (0–0) at Merrimack Warriors (0–0) – Game summary

Quarter	1	2	3	4	Total
Chargers	0	0	0	0	0
Warriors	0	0	0	0	0

at Duane Stadium • North Andover, Massachusetts

- Date: September 26

Game information

First quarter
Second quarter
Third quarter
Fourth quarter

Statistics	NH	MRMK
First downs		
Plays–yards		
Rushes–yards		
Passing yards		
Passing: comp–att–int		
Turnovers		
Time of possession		

Team	Category	Player	Statistics
New Haven	Passing		
New Haven	Rushing		
New Haven	Receiving		
Merrimack	Passing		
Merrimack	Rushing		
Merrimack	Receiving		

=== at Yale ===
Merrimack Warriors (2–3) at Yale Bulldogs (1–1) – Game summary

Quarter	1	2	3	4	Total
Warriors	0	0	0	0	0
Bulldogs	0	0	0	0	0

at Yale Bowl • New Haven, Connecticut

- Date: October 3

Game information

First quarter
Second quarter
Third quarter
Fourth quarter

Statistics	MRMK	YALE
First downs		
Plays–yards		
Rushes–yards		
Passing yards		
Passing: comp–att–int		
Turnovers		
Time of possession		

Team	Category	Player	Statistics
Merrimack	Passing		
Merrimack	Rushing		
Merrimack	Receiving		
Yale	Passing		
Yale	Rushing		
Yale	Receiving		

=== at Dartmouth ===
Merrimack Warriors (2–4) at Dartmouth Big Green (1–3) – Game summary

Quarter	1	2	3	4	Total
Warriors	0	0	0	0	0
Big Green	0	0	0	0	0

at Memorial Field • Hanover, New Hampshire

- Date: October 17

Game information

First quarter
Second quarter
Third quarter
Fourth quarter

Statistics	MRMK	DART
First downs		
Plays–yards		
Rushes–yards		
Passing yards		
Passing: comp–att–int		
Turnovers		
Time of possession		

Team	Category	Player	Statistics
Merrimack	Passing		
Merrimack	Rushing		
Merrimack	Receiving		
Dartmouth	Passing		
Dartmouth	Rushing		
Dartmouth	Receiving		

=== New Hampshire ===
New Hampshire Wildcats (2–6) at Merrimack Warriors (2–5) – Game summary

Quarter	1	2	3	4	Total
Wildcats	0	0	0	0	0
Warriors	0	0	0	0	0

at Duane Stadium • North Andover, Massachusetts

- Date: October 24

Game information

First quarter
Second quarter
Third quarter
Fourth quarter

Statistics	UNH	MRMK
First downs		
Plays–yards		
Rushes–yards		
Passing yards		
Passing: comp–att–int		
Turnovers		
Time of possession		

Team	Category	Player	Statistics
New Hampshire	Passing		
New Hampshire	Rushing		
New Hampshire	Receiving		
Merrimack	Passing		
Merrimack	Rushing		
Merrimack	Receiving		

=== Wagner ===
Wagner Seahawks (1–7) at Merrimack Warriors (3–5) – Game summary

Quarter	1	2	3	4	Total
Seahawks	0	0	0	0	0
Warriors	0	0	0	0	0

at Duane Stadium • North Andover, Massachusetts

- Date: October 31

Game information

First quarter
Second quarter
Third quarter
Fourth quarter

Statistics	WAG	MRMK
First downs		
Plays–yards		
Rushes–yards		
Passing yards		
Passing: comp–att–int		
Turnovers		
Time of possession		

Team	Category	Player	Statistics
Wagner	Passing		
Wagner	Rushing		
Wagner	Receiving		
Merrimack	Passing		
Merrimack	Rushing		
Merrimack	Receiving		

=== at No. 16 (FBS) Wake Forest ===
Merrimack Warriors (4–5) at No. 16 (FBS) Wake Forest Demon Deacons (7–1) – Game summary

Quarter	1	2	3	4	Total
Warriors	0	0	0	0	0
No. 16 (FBS) Demon Deacons	0	0	0	0	0

at Allegacy Federal Credit Union Stadium • Winston–Salem, North Carolina

- Date: November 7
- TV announcers (ACCN): Roxy Bernstein, Rodney McLeod, and Madison Hock

Game information

First quarter
Second quarter
Third quarter
Fourth quarter

Statistics	MRMK	WF
First downs		
Plays–yards		
Rushes–yards		
Passing yards		
Passing: comp–att–int		
Turnovers		
Time of possession		

Team	Category	Player	Statistics
Merrimack	Passing		
Merrimack	Rushing		
Merrimack	Receiving		
Wake Forest	Passing		
Wake Forest	Rushing		
Wake Forest	Receiving		

=== at No. 14 Monmouth ===
Merrimack Warriors (4–6) at No. 14 Monmouth Hawks (7–2) – Game summary

Quarter	1	2	3	4	Total
Warriors	0	0	0	0	0
No. 14 Hawks	0	0	0	0	0

at Kessler Stadium • West Long Branch, New Jersey

- Date: November 12
- Game time: 12:00 p.m.

Game information

First quarter
Second quarter
Third quarter
Fourth quarter

Statistics	MRMK	MONM
First downs		
Plays–yards		
Rushes–yards		
Passing yards		
Passing: comp–att–int		
Turnovers		
Time of possession		

Team	Category	Player	Statistics
Merrimack	Passing		
Merrimack	Rushing		
Merrimack	Receiving		
Monmouth	Passing		
Monmouth	Rushing		
Monmouth	Receiving		

=== Sacred Heart ===
Sacred Heart Pioneers (4–6) at Merrimack Warriors (5–6) – Game summary

Quarter	1	2	3	4	Total
Pioneers	0	0	0	0	0
Warriors	0	0	0	0	0

at Duane Stadium • North Andover, Massachusetts

- Date: November 21

Game information

First quarter
Second quarter
Third quarter
Fourth quarter

Statistics	SHU	MRMK
First downs		
Plays–yards		
Rushes–yards		
Passing yards		
Passing: comp–att–int		
Turnovers		
Time of possession		

Team	Category	Player	Statistics
Sacred Heart	Passing		
Sacred Heart	Rushing		
Sacred Heart	Receiving		
Merrimack	Passing		
Merrimack	Rushing		
Merrimack	Receiving		
