= Merrimack Warriors football =

Intercollegiate American football team for Merrimack College

2026 Merrimack Warriors football team
- First season: 1996; 30 years ago
- Athletic director: Joe Foley
- Head coach: Mike Gennetti; 2nd season, 9–14 (.391)
- Location: North Andover, Massachusetts
- Stadium: Duane Stadium (capacity: 4,000)
- NCAA division: Division I FCS
- Conference: Independent
- Colors: Blue and gold
- All-time record: 154–157 (.495)
- Playoff record: 1–1 (.500)

Conference championships
- NE10: 2006, 2009
- Outfitter: New Balance
- Website: MerrimackAthletics.com

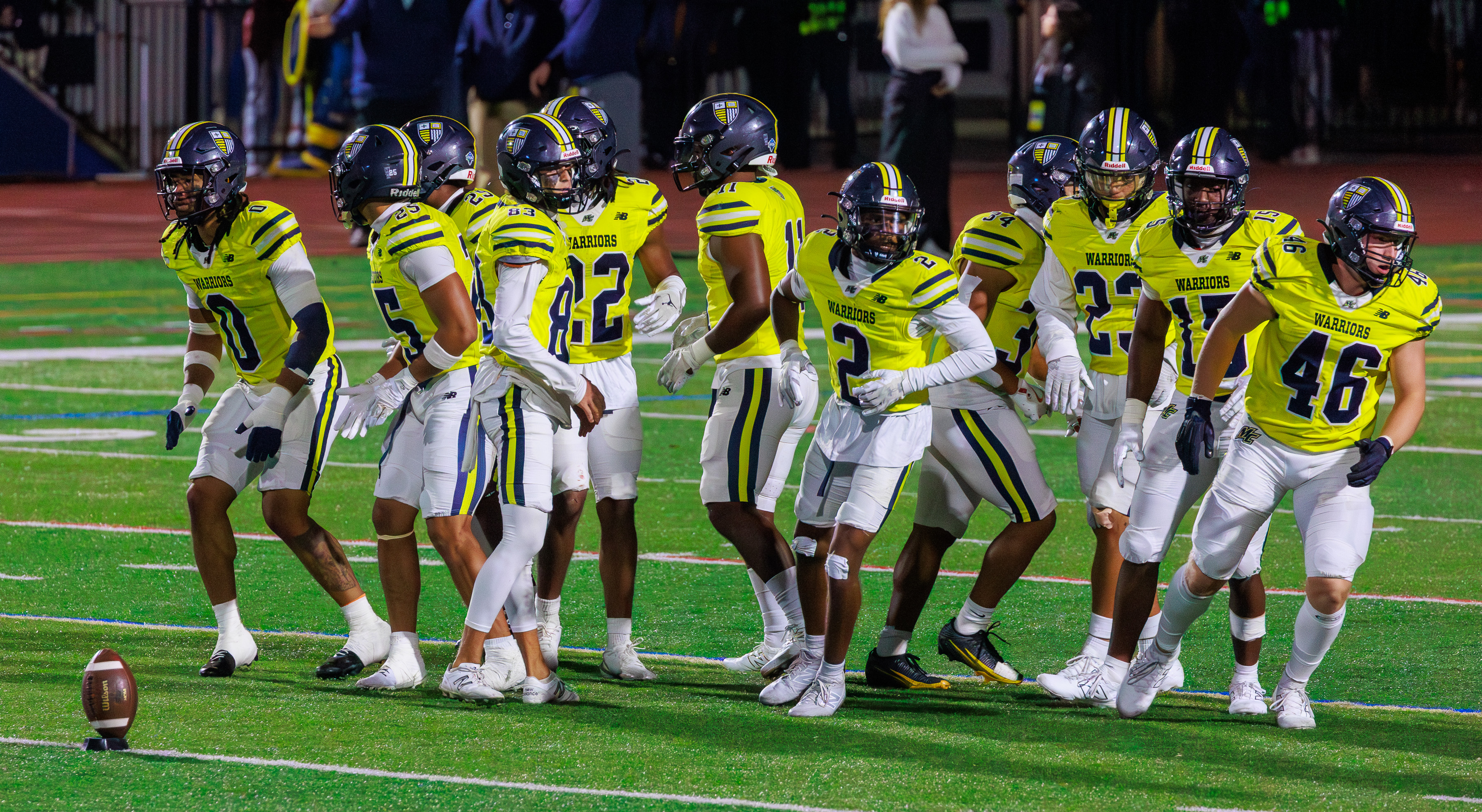
2025 players

The Merrimack Warriors football program is the intercollegiate American football team for Merrimack College located in the U.S. state of Massachusetts. The team competes in the NCAA Division I Football Championship Subdivision (FCS) and plays as an FCS Independent. Merrimack's first football team was fielded in 1996. The team plays its home games at the 4,000 seat Duane Stadium in North Andover, Massachusetts. The Warriors are led by Mike Gennetti.

== History ==
The Merrimack football program had its first official season in 1996. During this time the Warriors played their home games at Martone-Mejail Field. Which also served as the schools soccer and softball field. Led by head coach Tom Caito the warriors played a 9 game schedule. That consisted of both Division III and Division II opponents. They ended up going 5–4 in their inaugural season.

Before the 1997 season the Warriors joined the Eastern Football Conference. The conference shut down after only 3 seasons only lasting from 1997–2000. They would have their first really successful season in 1999 when they were 7–3 overall and 6–3 in conference.

In 2001 the Warriors and all the other schools from the Eastern Football Conference joined the Northeast 10 conference. Going 6–4 in 2001 and 2002. Coach Caito left after the 2002 season and was replaced by Jim Murphy. The warriors were 6–3 in 2003. Then in 2004 the Warriors had their best season in program history with an 8–2 record but did not qualify for the NCAA tournament. At the end of the year WR Elfren Quiles was the first player in program history to be honored as an All American. After leading the nation in receiving yards per game. 2006 wound up being another historic season for the Warriors going 8–4 overall and 7–2 in conference play. Merrimack also claimed a share of the NE10 championship this season which was the first championship in program history. They also qualified for their first and only appearance to the NCAA division II playoffs. The Warriors hosted Southern Connecticut State in the first round and won 28–26. They then went on the road to face Shepherd in the second round falling 31–7 to the rams. For all the success during the season Murphy was named NE10 coach of the year. Murphy left after the 2007 season following a 4–6 record then being replaced by John Perry. The warriors were 6-4 in Perry’s first year during the 2008 campaign season. In 2009 Perry led the Warriors to their second NE10 title going 6-2 in conference play and 7-3 overall. Despite this the Warriors did not qualify for the NCAA tournament. At the end of the season QB James Suozzo was the first player in program history to be named NE10 MVP after averaging 325.1 total yards per game. After a 4-6 record in 2010, they were 6-4 in 2011 and 2012 which would be Coach Perry’s final to years as he would leave to become the QB coach for Delaware in 2013.

Warriors linebacker Shawn Loiseau was the first player in program history to sign an NFL deal in 2012, after being NE10 defensive player the year in both 2010 and 2011.

The Warriors promoted assistant coach Dan Curran to replace Perry as their new head coach. The Warriors kicked off the 2013 season on the road against FCS school Wagner. This ended up being the programs first ever victory against a Division 1 opponent beating the Skyhawks in a high scoring affair 42-41. The Warriors finished the season 7-4 and would end the year with a 35-24 win over #8 Southern Connecticut State. Warriors QB Joe Clancy also became the first ever NE10 QB to throw for 4000 yards in a season. This however was the warriors last successful season at the D2 level, as they see mediocre results for the next 5 seasons.

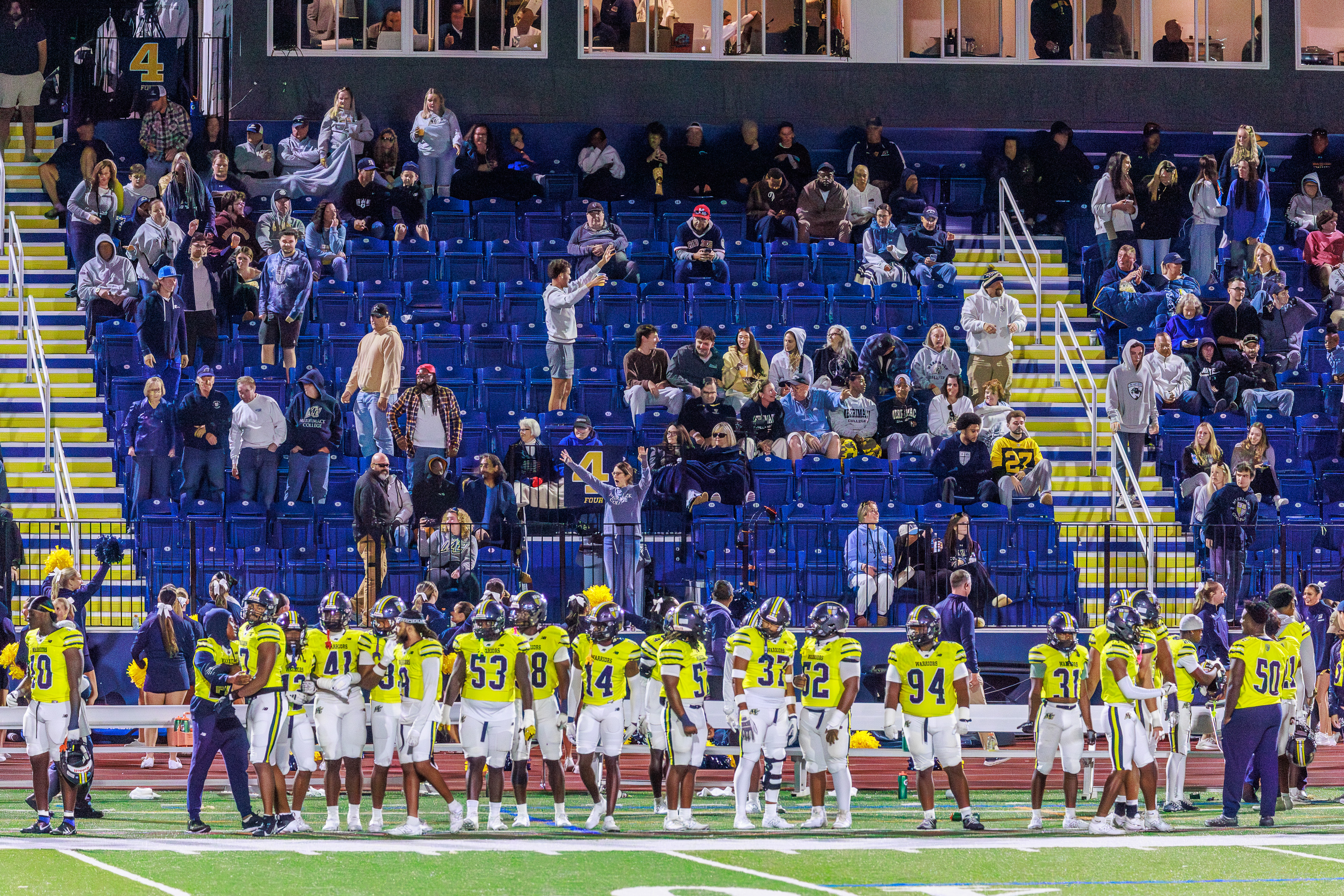
Warriors at Duane Stadium.

During the 2017 season they played their first season at Duane Stadium.

In 2019, Merrimack announced they would move their athletics program up to the Division 1 level and would join the Northeast Conference with football becoming a Division I FCS program. . The Warriors played a mix of Division 1 and Division 2 schools in their first D1 season. They would finish the year 6-5 with 3 of those wins coming against D1 schools Delaware State, Presbyterian and LIU. Early on in the 2021 season the Warriors played their first game vs a ranked FCS opponent #24 Holy Cross. The Warriors pulled off the biggest win in program history beating the Crusaders 35-21. They finished the year 5-6. Jacari Carter became the first player in program history to be named a D1 all American at the end of the season. During the 2022 season they tied a program record in wins with a 8-3 overall record going 6-1 in conference play. The final game of the season ended up being a de facto conference championship game against the Saint Francis Sed Flash who were also carrying a 6-0 record in conference play going into the final week of the season. Due to the athletic program being in the last year of The NCAA's 4-year reclassification rule, the program was not eligible to qualify for the 2022 FCS Playoffs. The Warriors ended up losing 52-23 on home soil. In 2023 the Warriors found themselves in the same position overcoming a poor start to the season. The Duquesne Dukes were also 4-2 in conference play heading into the final week of the season. This set up another defacto NEC Championship Game with the Warriors being eligible for postseason berth. The Warriors met the same fate falling 26-14 on home soil. This would end up being the programs last game in the NEC.

In October 2023 it was announced Merrimack would leave the NEC to join the Metro Atlantic Athletic Conference along with fellow NEC member Sacred Heart. Due to the MAAC not sponsoring football, both Merrimack and Sacred Heart became FCS independents. Shortly after the 2023 season ended, Head Coach Dan Curran left the program to take up the same position at Holy Cross. The Warriors promoted long time assistant Mike Gennetti to become the 5th Head Coach in program history. In his first season the Warriors finished with a 5-6 record in their first year as an independent during the 2024 season.

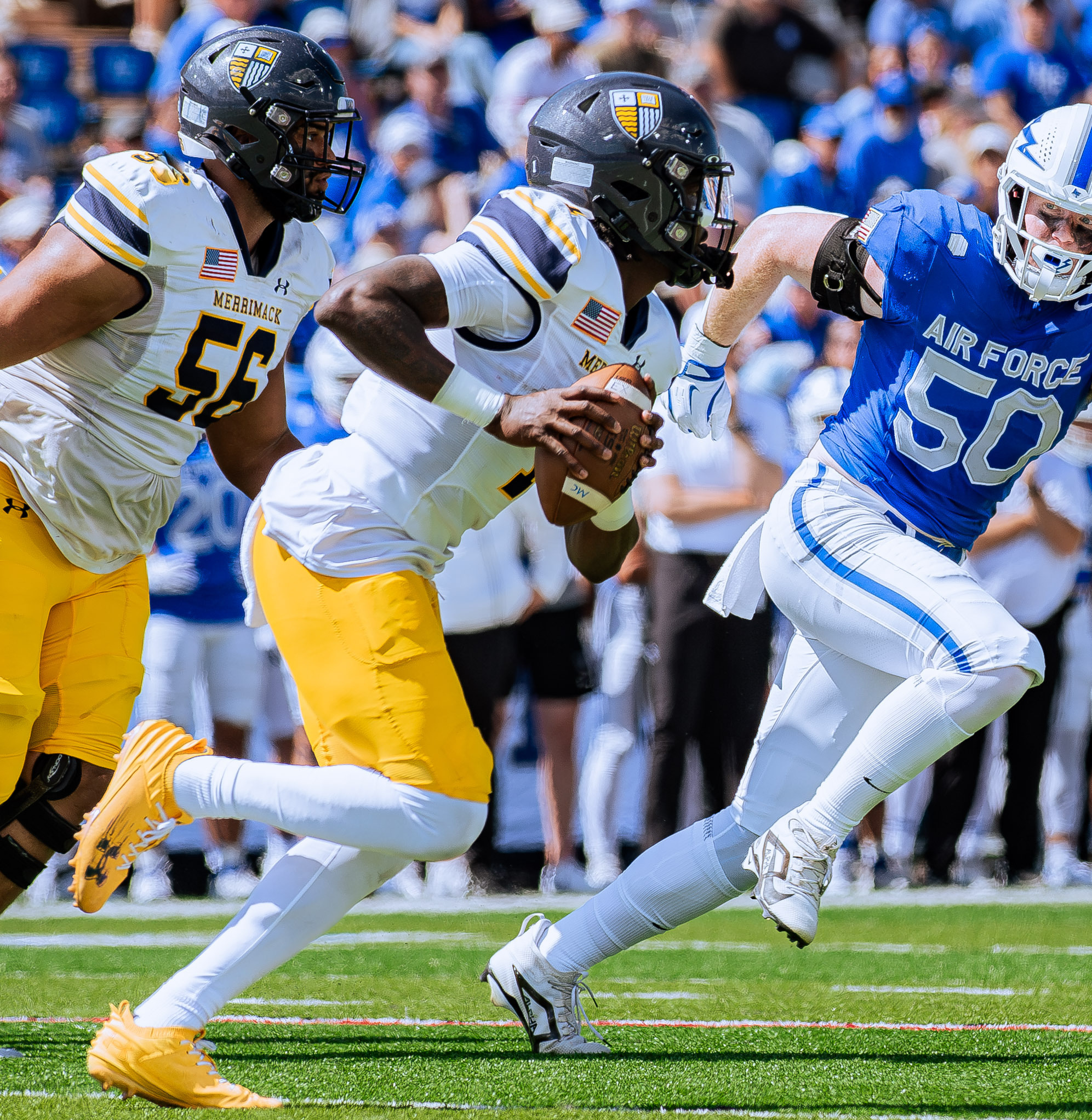
A game between Merrimack and Air Force in 2024

Wins vs Ranked FCS Opponents

- September 11, 2021 vs. #24 Holy Cross (35-21)
- November 14, 2026 vs. #14 Monmouth (29-28)

=== Classifications ===
- 1996: NCAA Division III
- 1997–2018: NCAA Division II
- 2019–present: NCAA Division I FCS

== Conference memberships ==
- 1985–1995: Independent
- 1996: Eastern Collegiate Football Conference
- 1997–2000: Eastern Football Conference
- 2001–2018: Northeast-10 Conference
- 2019–2023: Northeast Conference
- 2024–present FCS independent

== Head coaches ==
Tenure	Coach	Years	Record
1996–2002	Tom Caito	7	34–33
2003–2007	Jim Murphy	5	30–21
2008–2012	John Perry	5	29–21
2013–2023	Dan Curran	11	53–58
2024–present	Mike Gennetti	2	9–14

== Championships ==
=== Northeast 10 ===
Year	Coach	Conference record	Overall record	Note
2006	Jim Murphy	7–2	8–4	Co champions with Post and Southern Connecticut
2009	John Perry	6–2	7–3	Co champions with Bentley and Southern Connecticut

== Player & Coaches Awards ==
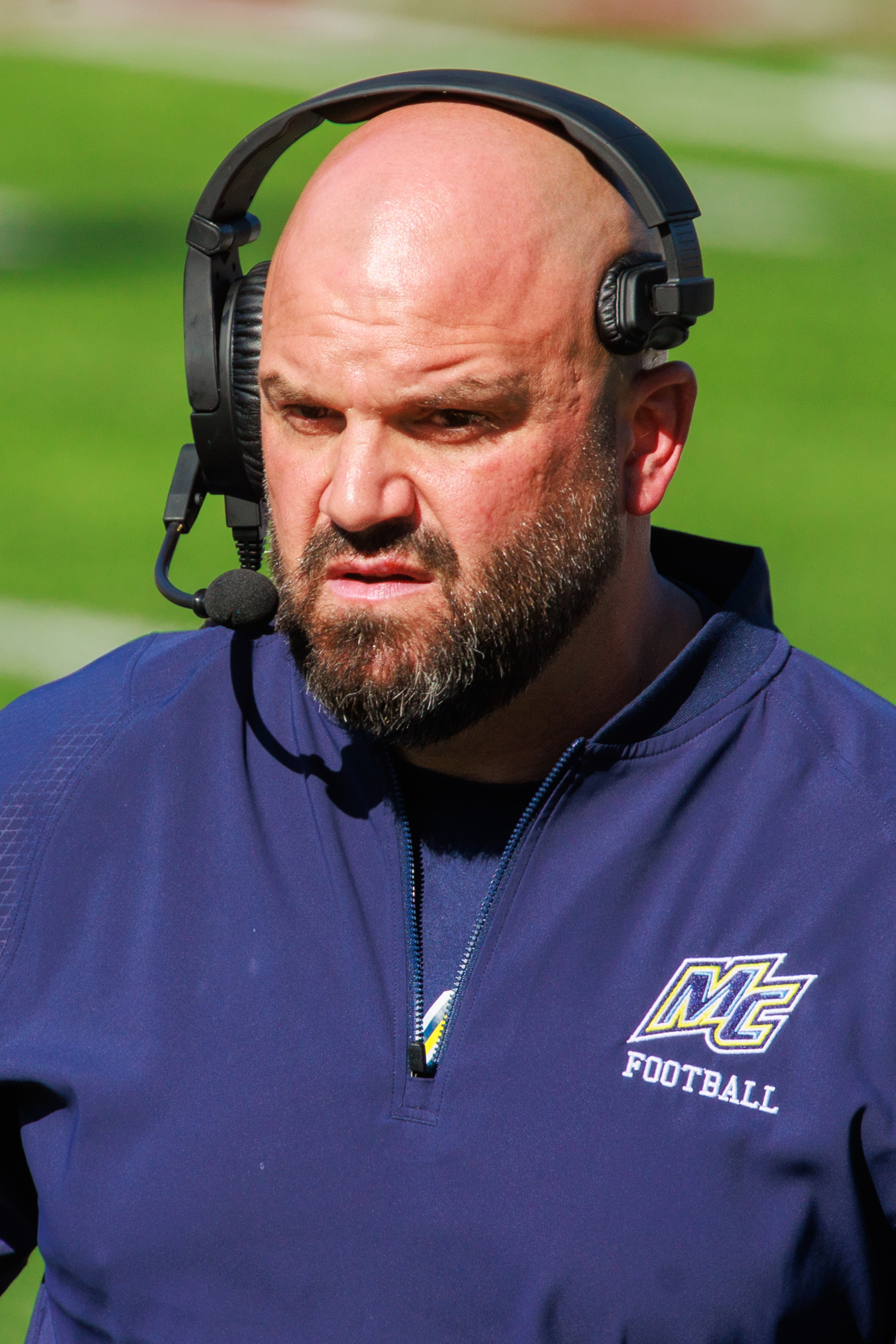
Head coach Mike Gennetti

=== Player Awards ===
George H. “Bulger” Lowe Award

- Jermaine Corbett (2024)

NEC offensive player of the year

- Donovan Wadley (2023)

FCS All-Americans

- Jacari Carter (2021)
- Victor Dawson (2022)
- Brandon Roberts (2022)
- Donovan Wadley (First Team 2023)
- Jermaine Corbett (Second Team 2024)

New England Football Writers/Grinold Chapter Gold Helmet

Awards defines the Most Valuable Player during each week of the College Football Season in New England

- Jermaine Corbett (Week 7 2024) | 170 Rushing Yards, 16 Receiving Yards, 2 TD, 106 Yards on KOR, 48-28 W vs Stonehill (October 19, 2024)
- Carlton Thai (Week 4 2025) | 3-5 FG (1 Blkd), Long of 38, 1-1 PAT, 19 Yard Game Winner, 16-14 W vs Central Connecticut State (September 20, 2025)

D2 All Americans

- Robert Slattery (1998, 1999)
- Tony Johnson (2010, 2011)
- Elfren Quiles (2004)
- Andrew Jackson (2006, 2008)
- Anthony Smalls (2009)
- Tony Johnson (2010)
- Shawn Loiseau (2010, 2011)
- Isaiah Voegeli (2011, 2012)
- Jere Brown (2013)
- Joe Clancy (2013)
- Quinn McDonough (2013)
- Ben Polci (2015)

NE10 Most Valuable player

- James Suozzo (2009)
- Isaiah Voegeli (2012)

NE10 Offensive player of the year

- Joe Clancy (2012, 2013)
- Jere Brown (2015)

NE10 Defensive player of the year

- Jimmy Festa (1999)
- Shawn Loiseau (2010, 2011)

NE10 Freshman/Rookie of the year

- Elfren Quiles (2004)
- Chris Carter (2018)

NE10 Defsinve Lineman of the year

- Robert Slattery (1998, 1999)
- Tony Johnson (2010, 2011)

=== Coach Awards ===
NE10 Coach of the year

- Jim Murphy (2006)

Gridiron Club of Greater Boston Assistant Coach of the Year

- Mike Gennetti (2022)

=== Merrimack Athletics Hall of Fame ===
The following is a list of people associated with the Merrimack football program who were elected into the Merrimack college Athletic Hall of Fame (induction date in parentheses)

- Andrew Jackson (2017)
- Tony Johnson (2019)
- Isaiah Voegeli (2023)
- Joe Clancy (2024)

== Duane Stadium ==
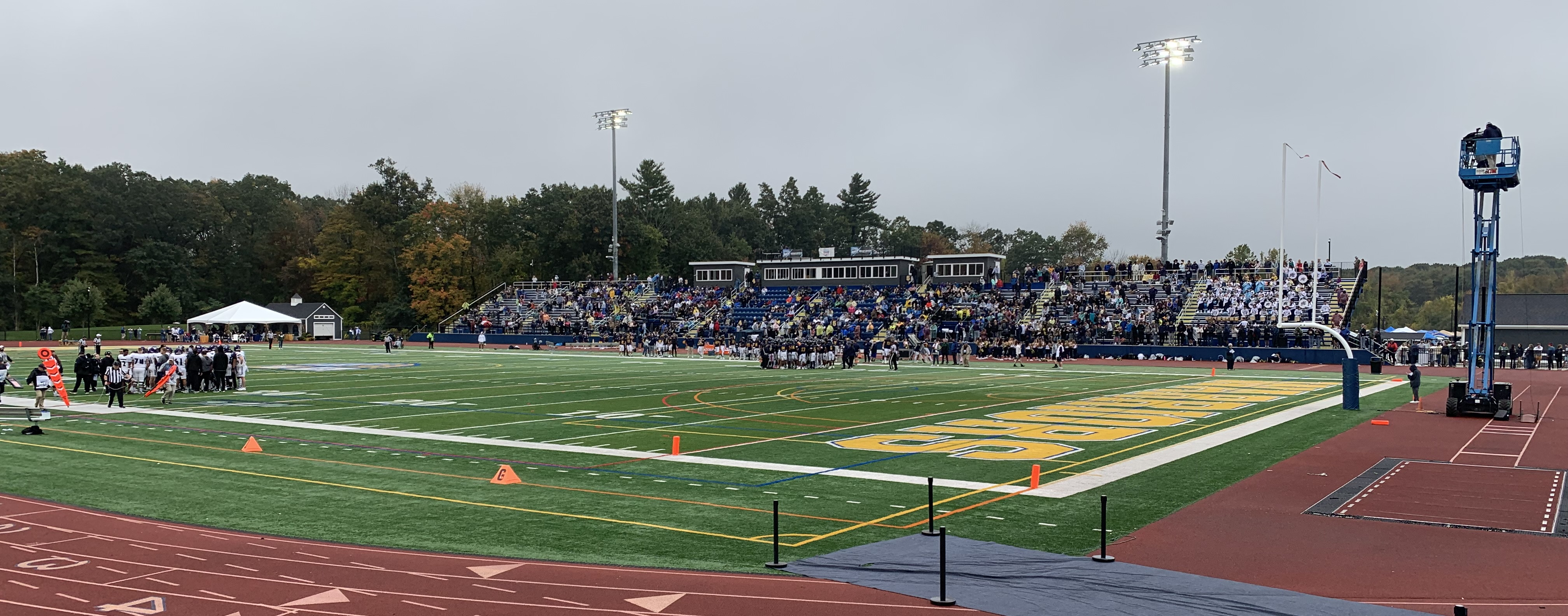
Duane Stadium 10/7/23 Merrimack Vs Stonehill

The warriors play their home games at Duane Stadium located in North Andover Massachusetts (capacity of 4,000). The stadium is named after Ken and Jincie Duane. Ken was a member of Merrimack's class of 1980 and was on the schools hockey and lacrosse programs. His wife served as a member of board of trustees. The stadium was opened in 2017 for bigger attendance figures as Merrimack’s enrollment began to grow.

== Notable players ==
Name	Position	Years at Merrimack	Teams
Shawn Loiseau	LB	2008–2011	Houston Texans; Indianapolis Colts; Massachusetts Pirates
Jay Nyamwaya	DL	2022	Pittsburgh Steelers; Massachusetts Pirates
Darion McKenzie	DB	2017–2023	Pittsburgh Steelers; Alouettes de Montréal
Anthony Witherstone	DB	2017–2022	Kansas City Chiefs; Winnipeg Blue Bombers

== Postseason results ==
Merrimack has made one appearance in the NCAA Division II football playoffs; their record is 1–1.

Year	Round	Opponent	Result
2006	First Round; Second Round	Southern Connecticut; Shepherd	W, 28–26; L, 7–31
Playoff Record			1–1

== Future opponents ==
Announced schedules as of July 28, 2026

2026	2027	2028
Rhode Island (8/28)	at Central Connecticut (9/4)	at Brown (10/7)
at Delaware (9/3)	at Rhode Island (11/13)	
at Maine (9/12)	at Maine (TBD)	
at Tarleton State (9/19)		
New Haven (9/26)		
at Yale (10/3)		
at Dartmouth (10/17)		
New Hampshire (10/24)		
Wagner (10/31)		
at Wake Forest (11/7)		
at Monmouth (11/14)		
Sacred Heart (11/21)		

== Season-by-season record ==
Season	Record (Overall / Conference)	Coach	Championships / postseason	Notes
1996	5–4 / 5–4	Thomas Caito		
1997	3–6 / 3–5	Thomas Caito		Joined Eastern Football Conference
1998	3–6 / 2–6	Thomas Caito		
1999	7–3 / 6–3	Thomas Caito		
2000	4–6 / 4–5	Thomas Caito		
2001	6–4 / 6–4	Thomas Caito		Joined NE-10
2002	6–4 / 6–4	Thomas Caito		
	34–33 (.501)	Thomas Caito Career		
2003	6–3 / 6–3	Jim Murphy		
2004	8–2 / 7–2	Jim Murphy		
2005	4–6 / 3–6	Jim Murphy		
2006	8–4 / 7–2	Jim Murphy	NE-10 co-champions Southern Connecticut (NCAA Division II Playoffs – First Round, W 28–26); Shepherd (NCAA Division II Playoffs – Second Round, L 7–31)	
2007	4–6 / 4–5	Jim Murphy		
	30–21 (.588)	Jim Murphy Career		
2008	6–4 / 4–3	John Perry		
2009	7–3 / 6–2	John Perry	NE10 Co-champions	
2010	4–6 / 4–4	John Perry		
2011	6–4 / 5–3	John Perry		
2012	6–4 / 4–4	John Perry		
	29–21 (.580)	John Perry Career		
2013	7–4 / 5–4	Dan Curran		
2014	4–7 / 4–5	Dan Curran		
2015	6–5 / 6–3	Dan Curran		
2016	3–8 / 2–7	Dan Curran		
2017	4–6 / 4–5	Dan Curran		
2018	5–5 / 5–4	Dan Curran		
2019	6–5 / 0–0	Dan Curran		Joined NCAA Division I FCS
2020* (competed in spring 2021 due to COVID-19)	0–3 / 0–3	Dan Curran		
2021	5–6 / 2–5	Dan Curran		First Full season in the NEC
2022	8–3 / 6–1	Dan Curran	De facto NEC championship game vs Saint Francis (PA) (L 23–52)	
2023	5–6 / 4–3	Dan Curran	De facto NEC championship game vs Duquesne (L 14–26)	
	53–58 (.477)	Dan Curran Career		
2024	5–6	Mike Gennetti		Became a FCS independent
2025	4–8	Mike Gennetti		

== Merrimack College Football Records ==
Longest Field Goal

- 53 Lliam Davis vs Stonehill, October 19, 2024
- 51 Lliam Davis vs Morgan State, October 12, 2024
- 49 Lliam Davis vs LIU, October 21, 2023
- 48 Jon Ramsey vs Pace, November 9, 2002
- 47 Carlton Thai x2 vs Stony Brook, vs Colgate, September 27, 2025, November 1, 2025
- 47 Sean Garvey vs CW Post, November 4, 2006
