= 2025 Merrimack Warriors football team =

College football season

2025 Merrimack Warriors football

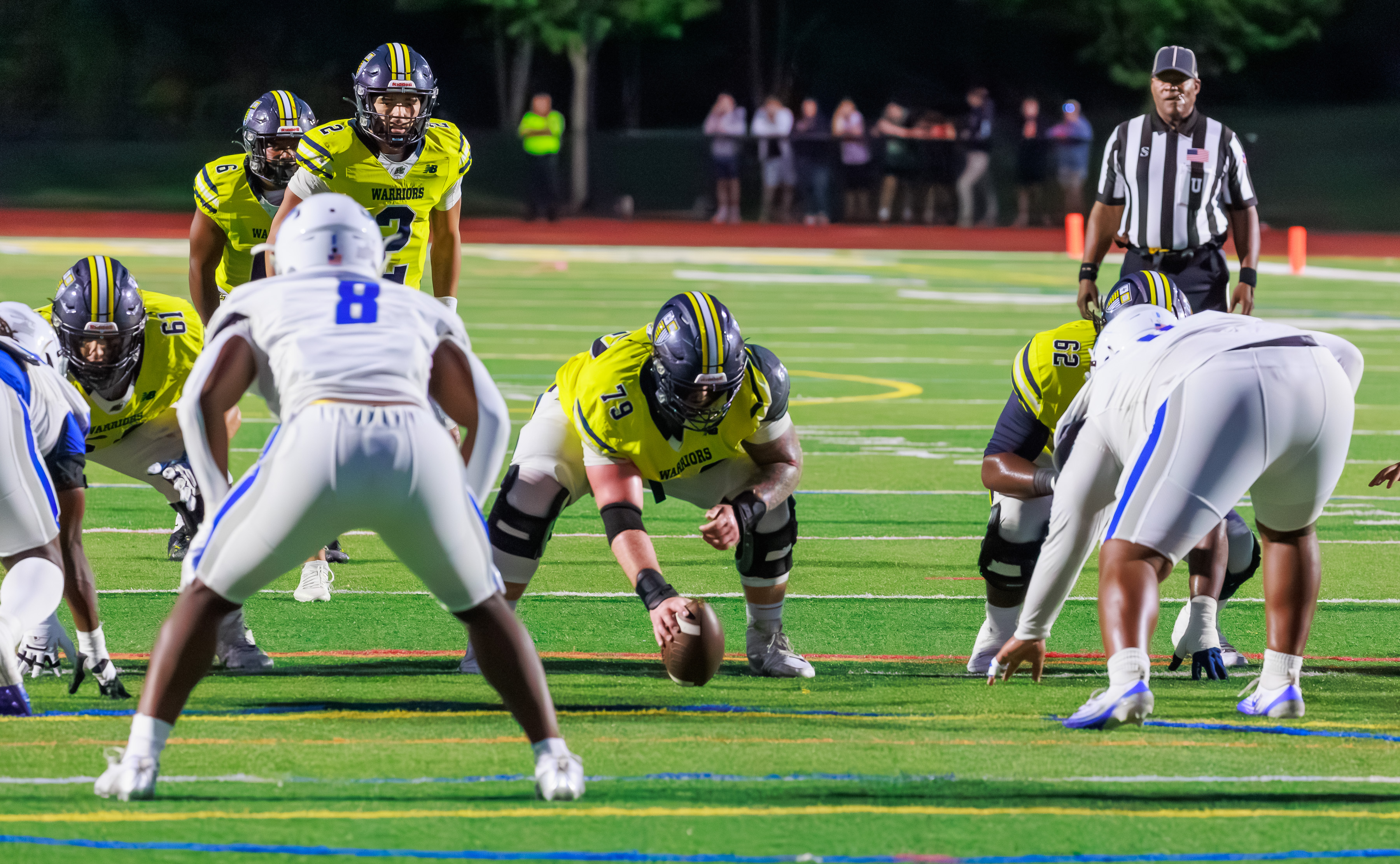
- Merrimack's Logan Wylie with the ball
- Conference: Independent
- Record: 4–8
- Head coach: Mike Gennetti (2nd season)
- Offensive coordinator: Aynsley Rosenbaum (3rd season)
- Home stadium: Duane Stadium

2025 NCAA Division I FCS independents football standings
	Conf.			Overall
Team	W		L	W		L
Sacred Heart		–		8	–	4
Merrimack		–		4	–	8

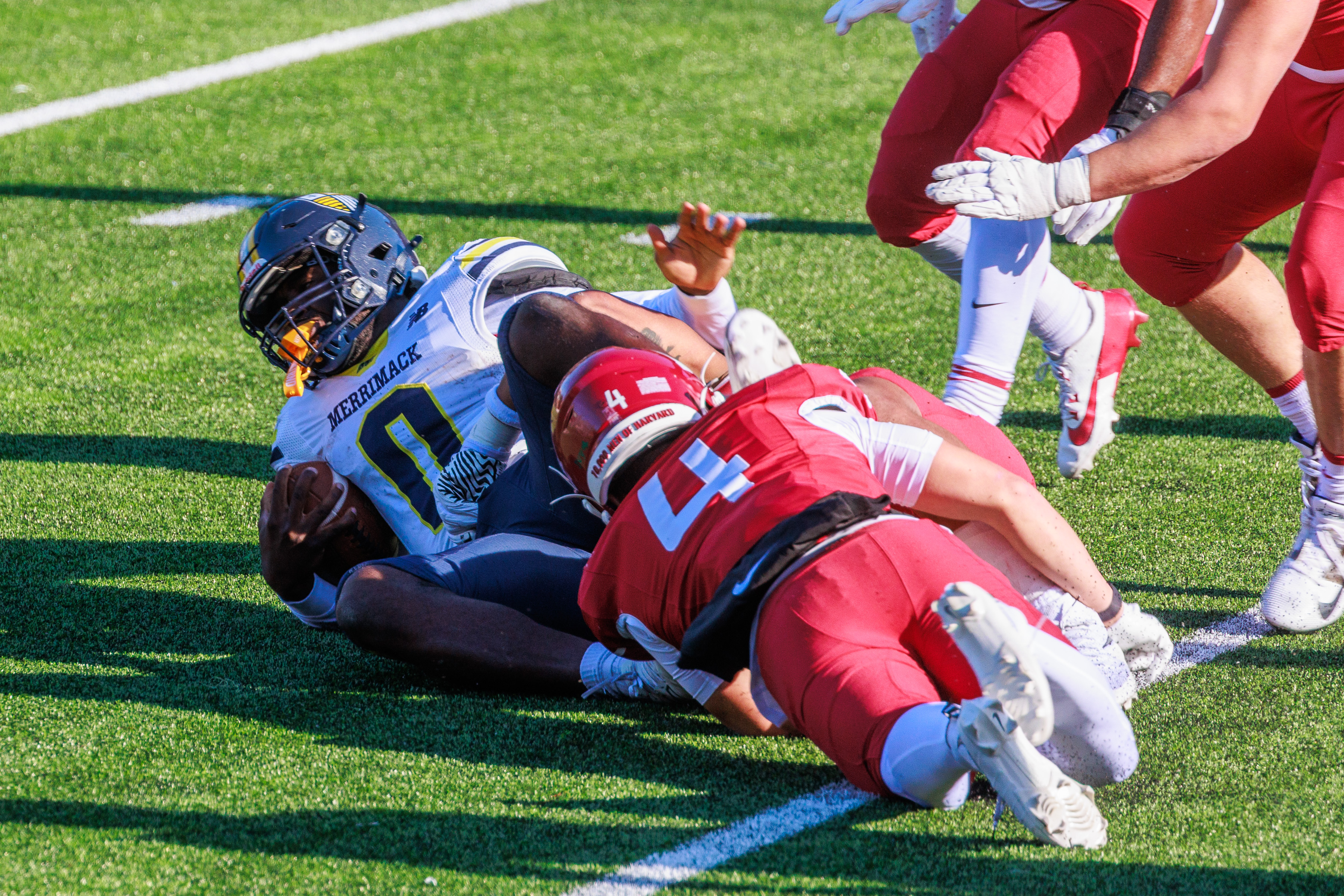
Merrimack lost to Harvard, 7-31

The 2025 Merrimack Warriors football team represented Merrimack College as an independent during the 2025 NCAA Division I FCS football season. The Warriors were led by second-year head coach Mike Gennetti and played home games at Duane Stadium in North Andover, Massachusetts.

== Transfers ==
=== Outgoing ===
Player	Position	Destination
Amir Johnson	OL	Boston College
Favor Bate	LB	Boston College
Christian Smith	OL	Rhode Island
Brandon Smith	OL	South Dakota

=== Incoming ===
Player	Position	Destination
Trent Brown	DB	Rutgers
Bertin Placide	DB	Tennessee Tech

== Schedule ==
Date	Time	Opponent	Site	TV	Result	Attendance
August 30	12:00 p.m.	at Kent State	Dix Stadium; Kent, OH	ESPN+	L 17–21	8,647
September 6	1:00 p.m.	Saint Anselm	Duane Stadium; North Andover, MA	ESPN+	W 31–6	4,819
September 13	6:00 p.m.	at Kennesaw State	Fifth Third Stadium; Kennesaw, GA	ESPN+	L 13–27	11,040
September 20	6:00 p.m.	Central Connecticut	Duane Stadium; North Andover, MA	ESPN+	W 16–14	4,129
September 27	3:30 p.m.	at Stony Brook	Kenneth P. LaValle Stadium; Stony Brook, NY	FloFootball	L 10–35	3,596
October 4	1:00 p.m.	Robert Morris^{†}	Duane Stadium; North Andover, MA	ESPN+/NESN+	W 24–7	15,426
October 11	1:00 p.m.	Maine	Duane Stadium; North Andover, MA	ESPN+/NESN+	L 13–20	1,749
October 18	12:00 p.m.	at No. 18 Harvard	Harvard Stadium; Boston, Massachusetts	ESPN+	L 7–31	5,661
November 1	1:00 p.m.	at Colgate	Crown Field at Andy Kerr Stadium; Hamilton, NY	ESPN+	L 20–23 ^{OT}	2,713
November 8	3:30 p.m.	at New Haven	Ralph F. DellaCamera Stadium; West Haven, CT	NEC Front Row	L 31–41	5,821
November 15	12:00 p.m.	at Sacred Heart	Campus Field; Fairfield, CT	ESPN+	L 37–42	3,108
November 22	12:00 p.m	Fordham	Duane Stadium; North Andover, MA	ESPN+/NESN+	W 27–26	1,964
^{†}Homecoming; Rankings from STATS Poll released prior to the game; All times are in Eastern time; Source:

== Game summaries ==
=== at Kent State (FBS) ===
Merrimack Warriors (0–0) at Kent State Golden Flashes (FBS) (0–0) – Game summary

Quarter	1	2	3	4	Total
Warriors	0	3	3	11	17
Golden Flashes (FBS)	0	7	7	7	21

at Dix Stadium • Kent, Ohio

- Date: August 30
- Game time: 12:00 PM EDT
- Game weather: Cloudy • Temperature: 64 °F (18 °C) • Wind: NE at 8 miles per hour (13 km/h)
- Game attendance: 8,647
- Referee: Chris La Mange
- TV announcers (ESPN+): Anthony Lima (play-by-play), Je'Rod Cherry (analyst)

Game information

First quarter

- No scoring plays.

Second quarter

- (3:24) KENT – Cade Wolford 30-yard pass from C. J. Montes, Will Hryszko kick (Drive: 6 plays, 76 yards, 2:46; KSU 7-0)
- (0:01) MRMK – Carlton Thai 26-yard field goal (Drive: 8 Plays, 80 yards, 0:56; KSU 7-3)

Third quarter

- (9:56) KENT – Cade Wolford 79-yard pass from Dru DeShields, Will Hryszko kick (Drive: 2 plays, 80 yards, 0:45; KSU 14-3)
- (2:26) MRMK – Carlton Thai 37-yard field goal (Drive: 14 plays, 55 yards, 7:30; KSU 14-6)

Fourth quarter

- (8:38) MRMK – Seth Sweitzer 36-yard pass from Ayden Pereira, Cade Callahan Pass (Drive: 4 plays, 75 yards, 2:06; Tied 14-14)
- (5:40) MRMK – Carlton Thai 45-yard field goal (Drive: 4 plays, 6 yards, 2:06; MER 17-14)
- (5:28) KENT – Da'Realyst Clark 100-yard kickoff return, Will Hryszko kick (0:12; KSU 21-17)

Statistics	MRMK	KENT
First downs	17	15
Plays–yards	66–340	56–305
Rushes–yards	35–164	37–96
Passing yards	176	209
Passing: Comp–Att–Int	15-31–0	12-19–0
Turnovers	0	1
Time of possession	31:31	28:29

Team	Category	Player	Statistics
Merrimack	Passing	Ayden Pereira	15/31, 176 yards, TD
Merrimack	Rushing	Ayden Pereira	19 carries, 103 yards
Merrimack	Receiving	Seth Sweitzer	3 receptions, 59 yards, TD
Kent State	Passing	Dru DeShields	6/10, 118 yards, TD
Kent State	Rushing	Gavin Garcia	15 carries, 49 yards
Kent State	Receiving	Cade Wolford	2 receptions, 109 yards, 2 TD

=== Saint Anselm (DII) ===
Saint Anselm Hawks (DII) (1-0) at Merrimack Warriors (0-1) – Game summary

Quarter	1	2	3	4	Total
Hawks (DII)	0	0	0	6	6
Warriors	10	7	7	7	31

at Duane Stadium • North Andover, MA

- Date: September 6
- Game time: 1:00 p.m. EDT
- Game weather: Sunny • Temperature: 83 °F (28 °C)
- Game attendance: 4,819
- Referee: Tom Smith
- TV: ESPN+

Game information

First Quarter

- (6:40) MER – Cade Callahan 3-yard pass from Ayden Pereira, Carlton Thai kick (Drive: 11 plays, 64 yards, 6:43; Merrimack 7–0)
- (0:44) MER – Carlton Thai 29-yard field goal (Drive: 10 plays, 62 yards, 4:29; Merrimack 10–0)

Second Quarter

- (1:17) MER – Aveon Smith 6-yard run, Carlton Thai kick (Drive: 13 plays, 75 yards, 7:53; Merrimack 17–0)

Third Quarter

- (8:42) MER – Brendon Wyatt 39-yard run, Carlton Thai kick (Drive: 5 plays, 80 yards, 2:54; Merrimack 24–0)

Fourth Quarter

- (6:59) STA – Jaidin Haynes 18-yard pass from Drew Forkner (Drive: 5 plays, 18 yards, 2:52; Merrimack 24–6)
- (0:41) MER – Nasir Maryland 70-yard interception, Carlton Thai kick (Merrimack 31–6)

Statistics	STA	MRMK
First downs	11	20
Total yards	193	450
Rushing yards	52	195
Passing yards	141	255
Passing: Comp–Att–Int	14–34–1	21–29–1
Time of possession	25:59	34:01

Team	Category	Player	Statistics
Saint Anselm	Passing	Ronan Noke	7/11, 86 yards, INT
Saint Anselm	Rushing	Ronan Noke	4 carries, 23 yards
Saint Anselm	Receiving	Jackson Ritter	1 reception, 49 yards
Merrimack	Passing	Ayden Pereira	20/27, 239 yards, TD
Merrimack	Rushing	Brendon Wyatt	8 carries, 74 yards, TD
Merrimack	Receiving	Seth Sweitzer	4 receptions, 81 yards

=== at Kennesaw State (FBS) ===
Merrimack Warriors (1-1) at Kennesaw State Owls (FBS) (0-2) – Game summary

Quarter	1	2	3	4	Total
Warriors	0	0	0	13	13
Owls (FBS)	0	7	17	3	27

at Fifth Third Stadium • Kennesaw, GA

- Date: September 13
- Game time: 6:00 PM EDT
- Game weather: Sunny, 83 °F (28 °C)
- Game attendance: 11,040
- Referee: Jereme Tate
- TV announcers (ESPN+): Nolan Alexander (play-by-play), Caleb O'Neal (analyst) and Jade Barkett (sideline)

Game information

First quarter

- No scoring plays.

Second quarter

- KENN – Dexter Williams II 4-yard run (Britton Williams kick), 4:45. Owls 7–0. Drive: 13 plays, 85 yards, 3:56.

Third quarter

- KENN – Gabriel Benyard 7-yard pass from Amari Odom (Britton Williams kick), 9:47. Owls 14–0. Drive: 4 plays, 39 yards, 1:06.
- KENN – Amari Odom 12-yard run (Britton Williams kick), 7:07. Owls 21–0. Drive: 4 plays, 45 yards, 1:30.
- KENN – Britton Williams 38-yard field goal, 1:07. Owls 24–0. Drive: 8 plays, 47 yards, 2:58.

Fourth quarter

- MRMK – Ayden Pereira 1-yard run (Carlton Thai kick), 10:04. Owls 24–7. Drive: 10 plays, 75 yards, 6:03.
- MRMK – R. J. Chapman 85-yard interception return (pass failed), 7:13. Owls 24–13.
- KENN – Britton Williams 44-yard field goal, 1:55. Owls 27–13. Drive: 9 plays, 24 yards, 5:18.

Statistics	MRMK	KENN
First downs	16	21
Plays–yards	63–294	63–369
Rushes–yards	38–79	32–173
Passing yards	215	196
Passing: Comp–Att–Int	13–25–0	21–31–1
Turnovers	0	1
Time of possession	36:48	23:12

Team	Category	Player	Statistics
Merrimack	Passing	Ayden Pereira	12/23, 181 yards
Merrimack	Rushing	Ayden Pereira	23 carries, 62 yards, TD
Merrimack	Receiving	Jalen McDonald	5 receptions, 116 yards
Kennesaw State	Passing	Amari Odom	12/14, 108 yards, TD
Kennesaw State	Rushing	Alexander Diggs	9 carries, 55 yards
Kennesaw State	Receiving	Christian Moss	6 receptions, 68 yards

=== Central Connecticut ===
Central Connecticut Blue Devils (2-1) vs. Merrimack Warriors (1-2) – Game summary

Quarter	1	2	3	4	Total
Blue Devils	0	0	0	14	14
Warriors	0	10	3	3	16

at Duane Stadium • North Andover, MA

- Date: September 20
- Game time: 6:00 p.m. EDT
- Game weather: Sunny
- Game attendance: 4,129
- Referee: John Smith
- TV announcers (ESPN+): John Avino (play-by-play), Jacob Vanryn (analyst) and Isaiah Voegeli (sideline)

Game information

First Quarter

- no scoring

Second Quarter

- (14:02) MC - Ayden Pereira 5 yd run, Carlton Thai kick, (1 plays, 5 yards, TOP 00:05; 7-0 Merrimack)
- (09:07) MC - Carlton Thai 28 yd field goal, (7 plays, 15 yards, TOP 04:08; 10-0 Merrimack)

Third Quarter

- (07:43) MC - Carlton Thai 38 yd field goal, (6 plays, 7 yards, TOP 02:20; 13-0 Merrimack)

Fourth Quarter

- (09:23) CCSU - Elijah Howard 21 yd run, Jack Hennessey kick, (4 plays, 61 yards, TOP 01:47; 13-7 Merrimack)
- (01:32) CCSU - Elijah Howard 1 yd run, Jack Hennessey kick, (7 plays, 40 yards, TOP 01:53; 14-13 Central Connecticut)
- (00:01) MC - Carlton Thai 19 yd field goal, (7 plays, 66 yards, TOP 01:24; 16-14 Merrimack)

Statistics	CCSU	MRMK
First downs	17	20
Total yards	262	314
Rushing yards	88	190
Passing yards	174	124
Passing: Comp–Att–Int	14–32–1	12–30–2
Time of possession	23:41	36:19

Team	Category	Player	Statistics
Central Connecticut	Passing	Brady Olson	14/32, 174 yards, 1 INT
Central Connecticut	Rushing	Elijah Howard	16 carries, 91 yards, 2 TD
Central Connecticut	Receiving	Dave Pardo	2 receptions, 63 yards
Merrimack	Passing	Ayden Pereira	12/29, 124 yards, 2 INT
Merrimack	Rushing	Ayden Pereira	13 carries, 71 yards, TD
Merrimack	Receiving	Keshawn Brown	4 receptions, 50 yards

=== at Stony Brook ===
Merrimack Warriors (2-2) vs. Stony Brook Seawolves (1-3) – Game summary

Quarter	1	2	3	4	Total
Warriors	0	7	3	0	10
Seawolves	10	10	8	7	35

at Kenneth P. LaValle Stadium • Stony Brook, NY

- Date: September 27
- Game time: 3:30 PM EDT

Statistics	MRMK	STBK
First downs		
Total yards		
Rushing yards		
Passing yards		
Passing: Comp–Att–Int		
Time of possession		

Team	Category	Player	Statistics
Merrimack	Passing		
Merrimack	Rushing		
Merrimack	Receiving		
Stony Brook	Passing		
Stony Brook	Rushing		
Stony Brook	Receiving		

=== Robert Morris ===
Robert Morris Colonials (1-3) vs. Merrimack Warriors (2-3) – Game summary

Quarter	1	2	3	4	Total
Colonials	7	0	0	0	7
Warriors	3	7	0	14	24

at Duane Stadium • North Andover, MA

- Date: October 4
- Game time: 1:00 p.m. EDT
- Game weather: Sunny
- Game attendance: 15,426
- Referee: Lance Carlen
- TV announcers (ESPN+): John Avino (play-by-play), Jacob VanRyn (analyst) and Natalie Noury (sideline)

Game information

First Quarter

- (9:26) RMU – Chaz Middleton 12-yard pass from Cooper Panteck, Jayson Jenkins kick (Drive: 5 plays, 92 yards, 2:49; Robert Morris 7–0)
- (3:22) MER – Carlton Thai 34-yard field goal (Drive: 11 plays, 44 yards, 5:56; Robert Morris 7–3)

Second Quarter

- (1:53) MER – Brendon Wyatt 20-yard pass from Aveon Smith, Carlton Thai kick (Drive: 12 plays, 60 yards, 6:48; Merrimack 10–7)

Third Quarter

No scoring plays

Fourth Quarter

- (10:01) MER – Ayden Pereira 5-yard run, Carlton Thai kick (Drive: 12 plays, 80 yards, 7:35; Merrimack 17–7)
- (3:31) MER – DeMarcus McElroy 1-yard run, Carlton Thai kick (Drive: 6 plays, 97 yards, 3:50; Merrimack 24–7)

Statistics	RMU	MRMK
First downs	10	20
Total yards	221	337
Rushing yards	94	223
Passing yards	127	114
Passing: Comp–Att–Int	12–23–2	8–17–1
Time of possession	20:56	39:04

Team	Category	Player	Statistics
Robert Morris	Passing	Cooper Panteck	11/21, 120 yards, TD, 2 INT
Robert Morris	Rushing	Owen McGraw	1 carry, 74 yards
Robert Morris	Receiving	Richard Ransom	3 receptions, 49 yards
Merrimack	Passing	Ayden Pereira	5/13, 73 yards, INT
Merrimack	Rushing	DeMarcus McElroy	7 carries, 98 yards, TD
Merrimack	Receiving	Cade Callahan	1 reception, 39 yards

=== Maine ===
Maine Black Bears (2-4) vs. Merrimack Warriors (3-3) – Game summary

Quarter	1	2	3	4	Total
Black Bears	7	6	0	7	20
Warriors	7	3	3	0	13

at Duane Stadium • North Andover, MA

- Date: October 11
- Game time: 1:00 p.m. EDT
- Game attendance: 1,749
- TV: ESPN+

Statistics	ME	MRMK
First downs	20	15
Total yards	400	329
Rushing yards	241	200
Passing yards	159	129
Passing: Comp–Att–Int	12–25–1	15–26–2
Time of possession	30:56	29:04

Team	Category	Player	Statistics
Maine	Passing	Carter Peevy	12/25, 159 yards, INT
Maine	Rushing	Rashawn Marshall	19 carries, 146 yards
Maine	Receiving	Scott Woods II	4 receptions, 75 yards
Merrimack	Passing	Ayden Pereira	14/19, 129 yards, TD
Merrimack	Rushing	Ayden Pereira	15 carries, 131 yards
Merrimack	Receiving	Seth Sweitzer	4 receptions, 51 yards, TD

=== at No. 18 Harvard ===
Merrimack Warriors (3-4) vs. No. 18 Harvard Crimson (4-0) – Game summary

Quarter	1	2	3	4	Total
Warriors	0	7	0	0	7
No. 18 Crimson	7	6	11	7	31

at Harvard Stadium • Boston, MA

- Date: October 18
- Game time: 12:00 PM EDT
- Game weather: Sunny • Temperature: 58 °F (14 °C) • Wind: NW at 5 miles per hour (8.0 km/h)
- Game attendance: 5,661
- Referee: Alexander Randolph
- TV announcers (ESPN+): Alex Vispoli (play-by-play), Tim Murphy (analyst) and Amanda Keane (sideline)

Game information

First Quarter

- (5:51) HARV – Ryan Osborne 14-yard pass from Jaden Craig, Kieran Corr kick (Drive: 10 plays, 88 yards, 5:16; Harvard 7–0)

Second Quarter

- (9:14) HARV – Kieran Corr 27-yard field goal (Drive: 9 plays, 71 yards, 4:22; Harvard 10–0)
- (2:35) MRMK – Galamama Mulbah 20-yard run, Carlton Thai kick (Drive: 11 plays, 75 yards, 6:39; Harvard 10–7)
- (0:38) HARV – Kieran Corr 22-yard field goal (Drive: 8 plays, 70 yards, 1:57; Harvard 13–7)

Third Quarter

- (6:48) HARV – DJ Gordon 24-yard run, Brady Blackburn pass (Drive: 3 plays, 38 yards, 0:52; Harvard 21–7)
- (1:56) HARV – Kieran Corr 21-yard field goal (Drive: 7 plays, 33 yards, 2:30; Harvard 24–7)

Fourth Quarter

- (9:15) HARV – DJ Gordon 19-yard run, Kieran Corr kick (Drive: 6 plays, 81 yards, 2:45; Harvard 31–7)

Statistics	MRMK	HARV
First downs	20	25
Total yards	307	482
Rushing yards	189	177
Passing yards	118	305
Passing: Comp–Att–Int	13–29–1	17–29–1
Time of possession	31:59	28:01

Team	Category	Player	Statistics
Merrimack	Passing	Ayden Pereira	13/26, 118 yards, INT
Merrimack	Rushing	Ayden Pereira	20 carries, 73 yards
Merrimack	Receiving	Seth Sweitzer	2 receptions, 28 yards
Harvard	Passing	Jaden Craig	17/29, 305 yards, TD, INT
Harvard	Rushing	DJ Gordon	8 carries, 104 yards, 2 TD
Harvard	Receiving	Brady Blackburn	4 receptions, 110 yards

=== at Colgate ===
Merrimack Warriors (3-5) vs. Colgate Raiders (3-5) – Game summary

Quarter	1	2	3	4	OT	Total
Warriors	0	10	7	3	0	20
Raiders	3	7	3	7	3	23

at Crown Field at Andy Kerr Stadium • Hamilton, NY

- Date: November 1
- Game time: 1:00 p.m. EDT
- Game weather: Cloudy • Temperature: 43 °F (6 °C) • Wind: NW at 12 miles per hour (19 km/h)
- Game attendance: 2,713
- Referee: Tom Zetts
- TV: ESPN+

Statistics	MRMK	COLG
First downs	20	16
Total yards	403	356
Rushing yards	166	110
Passing yards	237	246
Passing: Comp–Att–Int	21–32–2	14–28–1
Time of possession	32:51	27:09

Team	Category	Player	Statistics
Merrimack	Passing	Ayden Pereira	21/31, 237 yards, 2 INT
Merrimack	Rushing	Galamama Mulbah	7 carries, 71 yards
Merrimack	Receiving	Seth Sweitzer	6 receptions, 68 yards
Colgate	Passing	Jake Stearney	14/28, 246 yards, TD, INT
Colgate	Rushing	Danny Shaban	11 carries, 33 yards, TD
Colgate	Receiving	Reed Swanson	5 receptions, 134 yards

=== at New Haven ===
Merrimack Warriors (3-6) vs. New Haven Chargers (4-5) – Game summary

Quarter	1	2	3	4	Total
Warriors	7	17	0	7	31
Chargers	7	7	10	17	41

at Ralph F. DellaCamera Stadium • West Haven, CT

- Date: November 8
- Game time: 3:30 p.m. EDT
- Game weather: Sunny • Temperature: 62 °F (17 °C) • Wind: W at 7 miles per hour (11 km/h)
- Game attendance: 5,821
- Referee: Dave Stewart
- TV: NEC Front Row

Game information

First Quarter

- (11:05) UNH - AJ Duffy 1 yd run, Liam Quigley kick, (7 plays, 75 yards, TOP 03:55; 7-0 New Haven)
- (02:20) Mer - Ayden Pereira 1 yd run, Carlton Thai kick, (15 plays, 75 yards, TOP 08:45; 7-7 Tied)

Second Quarter

- (09:25) Mer - Galamama Mulbah 1 yd run, Carlton Thai kick, (4 plays, 30 yards, TOP 01:35; 14-7 Marrimack)
- (05:02) UNH - Evan Chieca 20 yd pass from Jayden Shwed, Liam Quigley kick, (9 plays, 72 yards, TOP 04:18; 14-14 Tied)
- (01:06) Mer - Cade Callahan 50 yd pass from Ayden Pereira, Carlton Thai kick, (3 plays, 70 yards, TOP 00:43; 21-14 Merrimack)
- (00:00) Mer - Carlton Thai 29 yd field goal, (5 plays, 64 yards, TOP 00:33; 24-14 Merrimack)

Third Quarter

- (12:19) UNH - Liam Quigley 16 yd field goal, (6 plays, 24 yards, TOP 01:52; 24-17 Merrimack)
- (07:04) UNH - Jonathan Lawson 70 yd pass from AJ Duffy, Liam Quigley kick, (2 plays, 70 yards, TOP 00:18; 24-24 Tied)

Fourth Quarter

- (14:45) UNH - Liam Quigley 29 yd field goal, (8 plays, 59 yards, TOP 02:47; 27-24 New Haven)
- (08:49) UNH - Isaac Glaudin 37 yd pass from AJ Duffy, Liam Quigley kick, (6 plays, 78 yards, TOP 03:27; 34-24 New Haven)
- (05:04) UNH - Kevonne Wilder 60 yd pass from AJ Duffy, Liam Quigley kick, (3 plays, 61 yards, TOP 01:34; 41-21 New Haven)
- (00:07) Mer - Austin Palmer 10 yd pass from Aveon Smith, Carlton Thai kick, (9 plays, 68 yards, TOP 01:55; 41-31 New Haven)

Statistics	MRMK	NH
First downs	23	20
Total yards	365	457
Rushing yards	165	126
Passing yards	200	331
Passing: Comp–Att–Int	13–24–1	16–27–0
Time of possession	35:36	24:24

Team	Category	Player	Statistics
Merrimack	Passing	Ayden Pereira	10/19, 172 yards, TD, INT
Merrimack	Rushing	Galamama Mulbah	9 carries, 44 yards, TD
Merrimack	Receiving	Cade Callahan	2 receptions, 55 yards, TD
New Haven	Passing	AJ Duffy	15/26, 311 yards, 3 TD
New Haven	Rushing	AJ Duffy	12 carries, 70 yards, TD
New Haven	Receiving	Jonathan Lawson	2 receptions, 114 yards, TD

=== at Sacred Heart ===
Merrimack Warriors (3–7) vs. Sacred Heart Pioneers (7–3) – Game summary

Quarter	1	2	3	4	Total
Warriors	7	10	7	13	37
Pioneers	7	7	21	7	42

at Campus Field • Fairfield, CT

- Date: November 15
- Game time: 12:00 PM EST
- Game weather: Sunny • Temperature: 45 °F (7 °C) • Wind: SE at 4 miles per hour (6.4 km/h)
- Game attendance: 3,108
- Referee: Michael Davis
- TV: ESPN+

Game information

First Quarter

- (14:12) MER - Brendon Wyatt 63 yd run, Carlton Thai kick, (2 plays, 75 yards, TOP 00:48; 7-0 Merrimack)
- (02:02) SHU - Jimmy Casey 20 yd pass from Jack Snyder, Matt Kling kick, (6 plays, 74 yards, TOP 03:12; 7-7 Tied)

Second Quarter

- (10:57) MER - Seth Sweitzer 13 yd pass from Ayden Pereira, Carlton Thai kick, (6 plays, 47 yards, TOP 02:58; 14-7 Merrimack)
- (10:15) SHU - Jack Snyder 82 yd run, Matt Kling kick, (1 plays, 72 yards, TOP 00:38; 14-14 Tied)
- (03:42) MER - Carlton Thai 26 yd field goal, (14 plays, 66 yards, TOP 06:33; 17-14 Merrimack)

Third Quarter

- (13:09) SHU - Mitchell Summers 53 yd run, Matt Kling kick, (4 plays, 75 yards, TOP 01:51; 21-17 Sacred Heart)
- (08:11) MER - Ayden Pereira 13 yd run, Carlton Thai kick, (9 plays, 75 yards, TOP 04:58; 24-21 Merrimack)
- (04:03) SHU - Mitchell Summers 1 yd run, Matt Kling kick, (9 plays, 75 yards, TOP 04:08; 28-24 Sacred Heart)
- (00:14) SHU - Trey Eberhart 81 yd run, Matt Kling kick, (3 plays, 92 yards, TOP 01:25; 35-24 Sacred Heart)

Fourth Quarter

- (12:16) MER - Ayden Pereira 26 yd run, two point pass conversion failed, (8 plays, 59 yards, TOP 02:49; 35-30 Sacred Heart)
- (08:55) SHU - Jack Snyder 23 yd run, Matt Kling kick, (7 plays, 52 yards, TOP 03:11; 42-30 Sacred Heart)
- (00:33) MER - DeMarcus McElroy 4 yd pass from Ayden Pereira, Carlton Thai kick, (11 plays, 51 yards, TOP 01:39; 42-37 Sacred Heart)

Statistics	MRMK	SHU
First downs	29	21
Total yards	499	521
Rushing yards	329	414
Passing yards	170	107
Passing: Comp–Att–Int	20–40–0	9–12–0
Time of possession	32:29	27:31

Team	Category	Player	Statistics
Merrimack	Passing	Ayden Pereira	20/40, 170 yards, 2 TD
Merrimack	Rushing	Ayden Pereira	22 carries, 169 yards, 2 TD
Merrimack	Receiving	Stephon Patrick	2 receptions, 40 yards
Sacred Heart	Passing	Jack Snyder	9/12, 107 yards, TD
Sacred Heart	Rushing	Jack Snyder	8 carries, 163 yards, 2 TD
Sacred Heart	Receiving	Logan Lyson	1 reception, 29 yards

=== Fordham ===
Fordham Rams (0-0) vs. Merrimack Warriors (0-0) – Game summary

Quarter	1	2	3	4	Total
Rams	-	-	-	-	0
Warriors	-	-	-	-	0

at Duane Stadium • North Andover, MA

- Date: November 22
- Game time: 12:00 p.m. EDT
- Game attendance: 1,964
- TV: ESPN+

Statistics	FOR	MRMK
First downs		
Total yards		
Rushing yards		
Passing yards		
Passing: Comp–Att–Int		
Time of possession		

Team	Category	Player	Statistics
Fordham	Passing		
Fordham	Rushing		
Fordham	Receiving		
Merrimack	Passing		
Merrimack	Rushing		
Merrimack	Receiving		

== New Program Records ==
Records
Player	Record	Stat
Mike Ryan	Highest Single-Season Punting Net Average	42.6
Carlton Thai	Most Kicking Points in a Single-Season and D1 Era Most Points Scored in Single-Season	76
Carlton Thai	Most FG's Made in a Single-Season	17
Team	Most Blocked Punts in a Single-Season	6
