= Shawn Loiseau =

American football player (born 1989)

No. 50 – Massachusetts Pirates
- Position: Linebacker
- Roster status: Injured reserve

Personal information
- Born: October 10, 1989 (age 37); Shrewsbury, Massachusetts, U.S.
- Listed height: 6 ft 1 in (1.85 m)
- Listed weight: 250 lb (113 kg)

Career information
- High school: Shrewsbury (MA)
- College: Merrimack
- NFL draft: 2012: undrafted

Career history
- Houston Texans (2012)*; Indianapolis Colts (2012–2014); Los Angeles KISS (2014); Hudson Valley Fort (2015); Sioux Falls Storm (2017)*; Nebraska Danger (2017); Massachusetts Pirates (2018–present)
- * Offseason or practice squad member only

Awards and highlights
- 2× Division II All-American (2010, 2011); 2× NE-10 Defensive player of the year (2010, 2011); 3× NE-10 All-Conference (2009–2011)

Career AFL statistics
- Total tackles: 16
- Sacks: 1
- Pass deflections: 2
- Stats at ArenaFan.com
- Stats at Pro Football Reference

Shawn Loiseau (/loʊˈiːsoʊ/ loh-EE-soh; born October 10, 1989) is an American professional football linebacker for the Massachusetts Pirates of the National Arena League (NAL). He is one of the most decorated student-athletes in Merrimack College history, and became the first Merrimack Warrior ever to sign an NFL deal.

== Early life ==
A native of Shrewsbury, Massachusetts, Loiseau attended Shrewsbury High School, where he set team record with 136 tackles as a senior in 2007. He was named Massachusetts Defensive Player of the Year and helped his team to a Central Massachusetts Division 1A championship, but was ignored by Division I schools because of an assault and battery conviction in his junior year after he slammed a kid to the ground.

He played college football at Merrimack College. Loiseau finished his career with 382 tackles, including 377 in his final three seasons, ranking him first all-time in school history. He broke the school record for tackles in a season with 133 in 2010 and was named 2nd team All-American. Loiseau was twice named Northeast-10 Conference Defensive Player of the Year, marking the first time a Merrimack player earned that award on two occasions.

== Professional career ==
=== 2012 NFL draft ===
Projected as a seventh-round selection, Loiseau was listed as the No. 9 inside linebacker available in the 2012 NFL draft. Sports Illustrated described him as a "tough-run defending linebacker who is best in the box", who, however, "struggles at playing football."

Pre-draft measurables
| Height | Weight | 40-yard dash | 10-yard split | 20-yard split | 20-yard shuttle | Three-cone drill | Vertical jump | Broad jump |
|---|---|---|---|---|---|---|---|---|
| 6 ft 1/2 in (1.84 m) | 244 lb (111 kg) | 4.81 s | 1.75 s | 2.85 s | 4.21 s | 7.31 s | 33 in (0.84 m) | 9 ft 2 in (2.79 m) |
All values from pre-draft workout at Boston College

=== Houston Texans ===
Loiseau was signed by the Houston Texans on May 14, 2012, after going undrafted in the 2012 NFL draft. The Texans released Loiseau on September 1, 2012.

=== Indianapolis Colts ===
On January 7, 2013, the Indianapolis Colts signed Loiseau to a Reserve/Future contract. On April 30, 2013, he was waived by the Colts. On August 8, 2013, he was re-signed by the Colts. He was released again on September 6, 2013.

=== Los Angeles KISS ===
On June 24, 2014, Loiseau was assigned to the Los Angeles KISS of the Arena Football League (AFL).

=== Sioux Falls Storm ===
On September 1, 2016, Loiseau signed with the Sioux Falls Storm of the Indoor Football League (IFL). On December 13, 2016, Loiseau was released by the Storm.

=== Nebraska Danger ===
On January 3, 2017, Loiseau signed with the Nebraska Danger. He was released on February 9, 2017. On May 23, 2017, Loiseau was re-signed by the Danger.

Massachusetts Pirates

In 2018 Loiseau signed with the Massachusetts Pirates. Who he still plays with for to this day.
