= Jim Murphy (American football) =

American football player and coach (born 1975)

Biographical details
- Born: February 23, 1975 (age 51); Reading, Massachusetts, U.S.
- Education: Northeastern (1998)

Playing career
- 1994–1997: Northeastern
- 1998: Barcelona Dragons
- 1998: New England Patriots
- Position: Quarterback

Coaching career (HC unless noted)
- 2001–2002: Bentley (OC/QB)
- 2003–2007: Merrimack

Head coaching record
- Overall: 30–21
- Tournaments: 1–1 (NCAA D-II playoffs)

Accomplishments and honors

Championships
- 1 NE-10 (2006)

Awards
- NE-10 Coach of the Year (2006)

Jim Murphy Jr. (born February 23, 1975) is an American former professional football player and college coach. He served as the head football coach at Merrimack College in North Andover, Massachusetts from 2003 to 2007.

Murphy played collegiately as a quarterback at Northeastern University in Boston. He played for one season for the Barcelona Dragons of NFL Europe. He spent part of two seasons on the New England Patriots roster.

Murphy coached for Bentley from 2001 to 2002 as the offensive coordinator and quarterbacks coach. In 2003, he was named the head football coach for Merrimack College. In five seasons he led the team to a 30–21 record. In 2006 the team went 8–4 and made it to the second round of the NCAA Division II playoffs. He was also named Northeast-10 Conference (NE-10) Coach of the Year following the team's playoff appearance and conference championship. He resigned following the 2007 season.

== Head coaching record ==
| Year | Team | Overall | Conference | Standing | Bowl/playoffs |
|---|---|---|---|---|---|
Merrimack Warriors (Northeast-10 Conference) (2003–2007)
| 2003 | Merrimack | 6–3 | 6–3 | 4th | |
| 2004 | Merrimack | 8–2 | 7–2 | T–3rd | |
| 2005 | Merrimack | 4–6 | 3–6 | T–7th | |
| 2006 | Merrimack | 8–4 | 7–2 | T–1st | L NCAA Division II Second Round |
| 2007 | Merrimack | 4–6 | 4–5 | T–6th | |
| Merrimack: | | 30–21 | 27–18 | | |
| Total: | | 30–21 | | | |
