= 2025 Sacred Heart Pioneers football team =

American college football season

2025 Sacred Heart Pioneers football
- Conference: Independent
- Record: 8–4
- Head coach: Mark Nofri (14th season)
- Offensive coordinator: Matt Gardner (9th season)
- Defensive coordinator: Darin Edwards (2nd season)
- Home stadium: Campus Field

2025 NCAA Division I FCS independents football standings
	Conf.			Overall
Team	W		L	W		L
Sacred Heart		–		8	–	4
Merrimack		–		4	–	8

The 2025 Sacred Heart Pioneers football team represented Sacred Heart University (SHU) as an independent during the 2025 NCAA Division I FCS football season. The Pioneers were led by 14th-year head coach Mark Nofri. Sacred Heart played home games at Campus Field in Fairfield, Connecticut.

This was SHU's last season as an independent, as the Pioneers will join CAA Football in 2026.

== Schedule ==
Date	Time	Opponent	Site	TV	Result	Attendance
August 30	2:00 p.m.	Stonehill	Campus Field; Fairfield, CT	ESPN+	W 12–7	4,197
September 6	12:00 p.m.	at No. 11 Lehigh	Goodman Stadium; Lower Saucon, PA	ESPN+	L 10–28	3,618
September 13	12:00 p.m.	at LIU	Bethpage Federal Credit Union Stadium; Brookville, NY	NEC Front Row	W 24–21	2,504
September 20	4:00 p.m.	at Norfolk State	William "Dick" Price Stadium; Norfolk, VA	ESPN+	W 31–28	8,127
September 27	12:00 p.m.	Delaware State	Campus Field; Fairfield, CT	ESPN+	W 35–31	6,456
October 4	12:00 p.m.	at Central Connecticut	Arute Field; New Britain, CT	NEC Front Row	L 35–42 ^{OT}	2,044
October 11	1:00 p.m.	Howard	Campus Field; Fairfield, CT	ESPN+	W 32–14	3,231
October 18	3:00 p.m.	at No. 4 Montana	Washington–Grizzly Stadium; Missoula, MT	ESPN+	L 21–43	26,147
November 1	12:00 p.m.	New Haven	Campus Field; Fairfield, CT	ESPN+	W 35–20	2,960
November 8	12:00 p.m.	Virginia–Lynchburg^{†}	Campus Field; Fairfield, CT	ESPN+	W 56–10	4,137
November 15	12:00 p.m.	Merrimack	Campus Field; Fairfield, CT	ESPN+	W 42–37	3,108
November 22	1:00 p.m.	at No. 9 Villanova	Villanova Stadium; Villanova, PA	FloFootball	L 10–34	4,101
^{†}Homecoming; Rankings from STATS Poll released prior to the game; All times are in Eastern time; Source:

== Game summaries ==
=== Stonehill ===
Stonehill Skyhawks (0-0) at Sacred Heart Pioneers (0-0) – Game summary

Quarter	1	2	3	4	Total
Skyhawks	0	0	0	7	7
Pioneers	0	0	9	3	12

at Campus Field • Fairfield, CT

- Date: August 30
- Game time: 2:00 PM EDT
- Game weather: • Temperature: 78 °F (26 °C)
- Game attendance: 4,197
- Referee: Travis Barta
- TV announcers (ESPN+): Freddie Coleman (play-by-play), Chris Smith (analyst) and Morgan Bedard (sideline)

Game information

First Quarter

- no scoring

Second Quarter

- no scoring

Third Quarter

- (07:09) SHU - Myles Hamilton safety, (2-0 Sacred Heart)
- (05:37) SHU - Chuck Webb 9 yd run, Matt Kling kick, (3 plays, 30 yards, TOP 01:20; 9-0 Sacred Heart)

Fourth Quarter

- (13:39) STO - Zachary Kim 10 yd pass from Jack O'Connell, Domenic Scalese kick, (7 plays, 71 yards, TOP 02:24; 9-7 Sacred Heart)
- (06:24) SHU - Matt Kling 29 yd field goal, (13 plays, 69 yards, TOP 07:08; 12-7 Sacred Heart)

Statistics	STO	SHU
First downs	16	18
Total yards	261	288
Rushing yards	49	161
Passing yards	212	119
Passing: Comp–Att–Int	30–39–0	11–21–0
Time of possession	27:38	32:22

Team	Category	Player	Statistics
Stonehill	Passing	Jack O'Connell	30/39, 212 yards, 1 TD, 1 INT
Stonehill	Rushing	Jarel Washington	17 carries, 47 yards
Stonehill	Receiving	Brigham Dunphy	9 receptions, 63 yards
Sacred Heart	Passing	John Michalski	11/21, 119 yards, 1 INT
Sacred Heart	Rushing	Chuck Webb	17 carries, 82 yards, 1 TD
Sacred Heart	Receiving	Dean Hangey	3 receptions, 67 yards

=== at No. 11 Lehigh ===
Sacred Heart Pioneers (1-0) at No. 11 Lehigh Mountain Hawks (1-0) – Game summary

Quarter	1	2	3	4	Total
Pioneers	7	0	3	0	10
No. 11 Mountain Hawks	7	14	0	7	28

at Goodman Stadium • Lower Saucon, PA

- Date: September 6
- Game time: 12:00 PM EDT
- Game weather: Sunny
- Game attendance: 3,618
- Referee: Henry Wimberg
- TV announcers (ESPN+): Marco Socci (play-by-play) and Mike Yadush (analyst)

Game information

First Quarter

- (14:47) SHU – Dean Hangey 91 yard kickoff return, Matt Kling kick (Drive: 1 play, 91 yards, 0:13; SHU 7-0)
- (11:38) LEH – Luke Yoder 28 yard run, Nick Garrido kick (Drive: 6 plays, 75 yards, 3:09 TIED 7-7)

Second Quarter

- (14:12) LEH – Jaden Green 10 yard run, Nick Garrido kick (Drive: 3 plays, 43 yards, 1:25; LEH 14-7)
- (1:06) LEH – Hayden Johnson 20 yard run, Nick Garrido kick (Drive: 4 plays, 33 yards, 0:31; LEH 21-7)

Third Quarter

- (8:13) SHU – Matt Kling 32 yard field goal (Drive: 10 plays, 65 yards, 5:17; LEH 21-10)

Fourth Quarter

- (14:55) LEH – Matt Machalik 2 yard run, Nick Garrido kick (Drive: 11 plays, 75 yards, 6:13; LEH 28-10)

Statistics	SHU	LEH
First downs	14	21
Total yards	177	423
Rushing yards	70	286
Passing yards	107	137
Passing: Comp–Att–Int	16–26–0	11–18–1
Time of possession	26:23	33:37

Team	Category	Player	Statistics
Sacred Heart	Passing	Jack Snyder	14/20, 94 yards
Sacred Heart	Rushing	Jack Snyder	9 carries, 30 yards
Sacred Heart	Receiving	Payton Rhoades	4 receptions, 26 yards
Lehigh	Passing	Hayden Johnson	10/17, 129 yards, INT
Lehigh	Rushing	Luke Yoder	12 carries, 127 yards, TD
Lehigh	Receiving	Goeffrey Jamiel	5 receptions, 60 yards

=== at LIU ===
Sacred Heart Pioneers (1-1) at LIU Sharks (1-1) – Game summary

Quarter	1	2	3	4	Total
Pioneers	0	7	7	10	24
Sharks	7	7	7	0	21

at Bethpage Federal Credit Union Stadium • Brookville, NY

- Date: September 13
- Game time: 12:00 p.m.
- Game weather: Sunny
- Game attendance: 2,504
- Referee: Lance Carlen
- TV announcers (NEC Front Row): Phil Constantino (play-by-play) and Jim Wright (analyst)

Game information

First Quarter

- (14:48) LIU – Luca Stanzani 75-yard run, Will Johnson kick (Drive: 1 play, 75 yards, 0:12; LIU 7–0)

Second Quarter

- (3:36) SHU – Mitchell Summers 14-yard run, Matt Kling kick (Drive: 12 plays, 99 yards, 6:54; Tied 7–7)
- (0:56) LIU – O'Shawn Ross 1-yard run, Lance Maiberg kick (Drive: 8 plays, 53 yards, 2:39; LIU 14–7)

Third Quarter

- (11:24) LIU – Jaylin Lewis 0-yard fumble recovery, Lance Maiberg kick (LIU 21–7)
- (5:05) SHU – John Michalski 3-yard run, Matt Kling kick (Drive: 12 plays, 75 yards, 6:19; LIU 21–14)

Fourth Quarter

- (12:15) SHU – Curtis Whiting 5-yard run, Matt Kling kick (Drive: 1 play, 5 yards, 0:00; Tied 21–21)
- (0:00) SHU – Matt Kling 21-yard field goal (Drive: 10 plays, 77 yards, 3:06; Sacred Heart 24–21)

Statistics	SHU	LIU
First downs	26	12
Total yards	407	208
Rushing yards	214	184
Passing yards	193	24
Passing: Comp–Att–Int	14–19–2	3–10–0
Time of possession	38:10	21:50

Team	Category	Player	Statistics
Sacred Heart	Passing	Jack Snyder	14/18, 193 yards, 2 INT
Sacred Heart	Rushing	Mitchell Summers	24 carries, 105 yards, TD
Sacred Heart	Receiving	Kevin McGuire	5 receptions, 88 yards
LIU	Passing	Luca Stanzani	2/4, 14 yards
LIU	Rushing	O'Shawn Ross	16 carries, 82 yards, TD
LIU	Receiving	Jaron Kelley	1 reception, 10 yards

=== at Norfolk State ===
Sacred Heart Pioneers (2-1) at Norfolk State Spartans (1-2) – Game summary

Quarter	1	2	3	4	Total
Pioneers	7	14	3	7	31
Spartans	7	7	0	14	28

at William "Dick" Price Stadium • Norfolk, VA

- Date: September 20
- Game time: 4:00 PM EDT
- Game weather: Sunny • Temperature: 80 °F (27 °C) • Wind: SW at 15 miles per hour (24 km/h)
- Game attendance: 8,127
- Referee: Javarro Edwards
- TV announcers (ESPN+): Ross Gordon (play-by-play), Don Carey (analyst) and Kendall Lanier (sideline)

Game information

First Quarter

- (10:55) SHU – Jack Snyder 18-yard run, Matt Kling kick (Drive: 9 plays, 70 yards, 4:00; Sacred Heart 7-0)
- (4:36) NORF – X'Zavion Evans 18-yard run, Evan Helfrich kick (Drive: 14 plays, 75 yards, 6:19; 7-7)

Second Quarter

- (14:55) NORF – X'Zavion Evans 7-yard run, Evan Helfrich kick (Drive: 8 plays, 73 yards, 3:06; Norfolk State 14-7)
- (2:42) SHU – Trey Eberhart III 28-yard run, Matt Kling kick (Drive: 8 plays, 71 yards, 3:05; 14-14)
- (0:48) SHU – Mitchell Summers 22-yard run, Matt Kling kick (Drive: 3 plays, 29 yards, 1:06; Sacred Heart 21-14)

Third Quarter

- (1:45) SHU – Matt Kling 19-yard field goal (Drive: 11 plays, 52 yards, 6:47; Sacred Heart 24-14)

Fourth Quarter

- (11:40) NORF – Kevon King 57-yard run, Evan Helfrich kick (Drive: 3 plays, 81 yards, 1:25; Sacred Heart 24-21)
- (5:32) SHU – Jack Snyder 7-yard run, Matt Kling kick (Drive: 6 plays, 49 yards, 2:41; Sacred Heart 31-21)
- (3:55) NORF – DreSean Kendrick 29-yard pass from Otto Kuhns, Evan Helfrich kick (Drive: 7 plays, 74 yards, 1:36; Sacred Heart 31-28)

Statistics	SHU	NORF
First downs	18	29
Total yards	390	550
Rushing yards	295	210
Passing yards	95	340
Passing: Comp–Att–Int	9–14–0	27–42–1
Time of possession	34:37	25:23

Team	Category	Player	Statistics
Sacred Heart	Passing	Jack Snyder	8/13, 92 yards
Sacred Heart	Rushing	Mitchell Summers	26 carries, 119 yards, TD
Sacred Heart	Receiving	Payton Rhoades	2 receptions, 46 yards
Norfolk State	Passing	Otto Kuhns	27/42, 340 yards, TD, INT
Norfolk State	Rushing	Kevon King	11 carries, 72 yards, TD
Norfolk State	Receiving	JJ Evans	7 receptions, 113 yards

=== Delaware State ===
Delaware State Hornets (3-1) vs. Sacred Heart Pioneers (3-1) – Game summary

Quarter	1	2	3	4	Total
Hornets	14	17	0	0	31
Pioneers	7	13	8	7	35

at Campus Field • Fairfield, CT

- Date: September 27
- Game time: 12:00 PM EDT
- Game weather: Sunny • Temperature: 75 °F (24 °C)
- Game attendance: 6,456
- Referee: Jonathan Grande
- TV announcers (ESPN+): Randy Brochu (play-by-play), Freddie Coleman (analyst) and Jenna Reynolds (sideline)

Game information

First Quarter

- (14:49) DSU – Marquis Gillis 75-yard run, Patrick Fisher-Butler kick (Drive: 1 play, 75 yards, 0:00; Delaware State 7–0)
- (8:54) SHU – Mitchell Summers 4-yard run, Matt Kling kick (Drive: 11 plays, 75 yards, 5:55; Tied 7–7)
- (6:09) DSU – Kaiden Bennett 4-yard run, Matt Kling kick (Drive: 7 plays, 75 yards, 2:45; Delaware State 14–7)

Second Quarter

- (13:02) SHU – Matt Kling 31-yard field goal (Drive: 11 plays, 53 yards, 4:53; Delaware State 14–10)
- (9:03) DSU – Marquis Gillis 2-yard run, Patrick Fisher-Butler kick (Drive: 11 plays, 65 yards, 3:59; Delaware State 21–10)
- (5:50) SHU – Jack Snyder 15-yard run, Matt Kling kick (Drive: 8 plays, 75 yards, 3:05; Delaware State 21–17)
- (5:39) DSU – Ryan Pellum Taylor 75-yard pass from Jayden Sauray, Patrick Fisher-Butler kick (Drive: 1 play, 75 yards, 0:11; Delaware State 28–17)
- (1:55) DSU – Patrick Fisher-Butler 33-yard field goal (Drive: 5 plays, 12 yards, 2:52; Delaware State 31–17)
- (0:00) SHU – Matt Kling 31-yard field goal (Drive: 10 plays, 61 yards, 1:55; Delaware State 31–20)

Third Quarter

- (3:17) SHU – Jason Palmieri 41-yard pass from Jack Snyder, Tyler Picinic pass (Drive: 10 plays, 80 yards, 4:11; Delaware State 31–28)

Fourth Quarter

- (6:44) SHU – Jason Palmieri 6-yard pass from Jack Snyder, Matt Kling kick (Drive: 15 plays, 55 yards, 7:19; Sacred Heart 35–31)

Statistics	DSU	SHU
First downs	16	29
Total yards	466	456
Rushing yards	253	158
Passing yards	213	298
Passing: Comp–Att–Int	13–19–0	28–36–0
Time of possession	23:09	36:40

Team	Category	Player	Statistics
Delaware State	Passing	Jayden Sauray	12/18, 207 yards, TD
Delaware State	Rushing	Marquis Gillis	13 carries, 123 yards, 2 TD
Delaware State	Receiving	Ryan Pellum Taylor	2 receptions, 85 yards, TD
Sacred Heart	Passing	Jack Snyder	28/36, 298 yards, 2 TD
Sacred Heart	Rushing	Mitchell Summers	20 carries, 74 yards, TD
Sacred Heart	Receiving	Mitchell Summers	4 receptions, 93 yards

=== at Central Connecticut ===
Sacred Heart Pioneers (4-1) vs. Central Connecticut Blue Devils (2-3) – Game summary

Quarter	1	2	3	4	OT	Total
Pioneers	0	14	7	14	0	35
Blue Devils	7	13	0	15	7	42

at Arute Field • New Britain, CT

- Date: October 4
- Game time: 12:00 PM EDT
- Game attendance: 2,044
- Referee: Travis Barta
- TV announcers (NEC Front Row): Bruce Biel (play-by-play) and Marc Robbins (analyst)

Game information

First Quarter

- (04:36) CCSU - David Pardo 7 yd pass from Brady Olson, Jack Hennessey kick, (8 plays, 78 yards, TOP 03:43; 7-0 Central Connecticut)

Second Quarter

- (14:50) CCSU - Jack Hennessey 26 yd field goal, (10 plays, 57 yards, TOP 03:44; 10-0 Central Connecticut)
- (06:47) CCSU - Jack Hennessey 22 yd field goal, (14 plays, 87 yards, TOP 06:35; 13-0 Central Connecticut)
- (04:05) SHU - John Michalski 1 yd run, Matt Kling kick, (6 plays, 75 yards, TOP 02:42; 13-7 Central Connecticut)
- (01:16) CCSU - Michael Trovarelli 29 yd pass from Brady Olson, Jack Hennessey kick, (10 plays, 90 yards, TOP 02:41; 20-7 Central Connecticut)
- (00:10) SHU - Payton Rhoades 22 yd pass from Jack Snyder, Matt Kling kick, (9 plays, 75 yards, TOP 01:06; 20-14 Central Connecticut)

Third Quarter

- (03:54) SHU - Trey Eberhart 9 yd run, Matt Kling kick, (10 plays, 60 yards, TOP 05:20; 21-20 Sacred Heart)

Fourth Quarter

- (08:33) CCSU - Donny Marcus 32 yd pass from Brady Olson, David Pardo pass, (7 plays, 72 yards, TOP 02:58; 28-21 Central Connecticut)
- (06:04) SHU - Jack Snyder 15 yd run, Matt Kling kick, (5 plays, 65 yards, TOP 02:29; 28-28 Tied)
- (02:54) CCSU - Brady Olson 9 yd run, Jack Hennessey kick, (8 plays, 75 yards, TOP 03:10; 35-28 Central Connecticut)
- (00:59) SHU - Jason Palmieri 37 yd pass from Jack Snyder, Matt Kling kick, (7 plays, 76 yards, TOP 01:48; 35-35 Tied)

Overtime

- (00:00) CCSU - Elijah Howard 25 yd pass from Brady Olson, Jack Hennessey kick, (1 plays, 25 yards; 42-35 Central Connecticut)

Statistics	SHU	CCSU
First downs	22	25
Total yards	437	509
Rushing yards	219	186
Passing yards	218	323
Passing: Comp–Att–Int	17-27	28-40
Time of possession	25:37	34:23

Team	Category	Player	Statistics
Sacred Heart	Passing	Jack Snyder	17/27, 218 yard, 2 TD
Sacred Heart	Rushing	Trey Eberhart III	14 carries, 83 yards, 1 TD
Sacred Heart	Receiving	Jason Palmieri	3 receptions, 65 yards, 1 TD
Central Connecticut	Passing	Brady Olson	28/40, 323 yards, 4 TD
Central Connecticut	Rushing	Elijah Howard	18 carries, 102 yards
Central Connecticut	Receiving	Elijah Howard	5 receptions, 69 yards, 1 TD

=== Howard ===
Howard Bison (3-2) vs. Sacred Heart Pioneers (4-2) – Game summary

Quarter	1	2	3	4	Total
Bison	7	7	0	0	14
Pioneers	0	3	13	16	32

at Campus Field • Fairfield, CT

- Date: October 11
- Game time: 1:00 PM EDT
- Game weather: Cloudy • Temperature: 65 °F (18 °C) • Wind: E at 9 miles per hour (14 km/h)
- Game attendance: 3,231
- Referee: Michael Davis
- TV announcers (ESPN+): Randy Brochu (play-by-play), Freddie Coleman (analyst) and Morgan Bedard (sideline)

Game information

First Quarter

- (2:02) HOW – Anthony Reagan Jr. 35-yard run, Matt Conord kick (Drive: 2 plays, 38 yards, 0:39; Howard 7–0)

Second Quarter

- (2:05) HOW – Tyriq Starks 14-yard run, Matt Conord kick (Drive: 8 plays, 57 yards, 5:01; Howard 14–0)
- (0:00) SHU – Matt Kling 49-yard field goal (Drive: 3 plays, 30 yards, 0:15; Howard 14–3)

Third Quarter

- (14:48) SHU – Mitchell Summers 80-yard run, Matt Kling kick (Drive: 1 play, 75 yards, 0:12; Howard 14–10)
- (6:20) SHU – Matt Kling 19-yard field goal (Drive: 9 plays, 82 yards, 4:36; Howard 14–13)
- (0:54) SHU – Matt Kling 25-yard field goal (Drive: 8 plays, 26 yards, 3:25; Sacred Heart 16–14)

Fourth Quarter

- (7:36) SHU – Payton Rhoades 15-yard pass from Jack Snyder, Matt Kling kick (Drive: 11 plays, 54 yards, 5:58; Sacred Heart 23–14)
- (3:26) SHU – Mitchell Summers 49-yard run, Matt Kling kick (Drive: 2 plays, 48 yards, 0:50; Sacred Heart 30–14)
- (3:04) SHU – Peter Schanne 0-yard safety (Sacred Heart 32–14)

Statistics	HOW	SHU
First downs	12	21
Total yards	233	476
Rushing yards	153	329
Passing yards	80	147
Passing: Comp–Att–Int	11–21–0	11–18–0
Time of possession	29:27	30:33

Team	Category	Player	Statistics
Howard	Passing	Tyriq Starks	11/21, 80 yards
Howard	Rushing	Anthony Reagan Jr.	17 carries, 116 yards, TD
Howard	Receiving	Anthony Reagan Jr.	4 receptions, 39 yards
Sacred Heart	Passing	Jack Snyder	11/18, 147 yards, TD
Sacred Heart	Rushing	Mitchell Summers	18 carries, 243 yards, 2 TD
Sacred Heart	Receiving	Payton Rhoades	4 receptions, 71 yards, TD

=== at No. 4 Montana ===
Sacred Heart Pioneers (5–2) at No. 4 Montana Grizzlies (6–0) – Game summary

Quarter	1	2	3	4	Total
Pioneers	0	7	7	7	21
No. 4 Grizzlies	22	7	0	14	43

at Washington–Grizzly Stadium • Missoula, MT

- Date: October 18
- Game time: 3:00 PM EDT
- Game weather: Sunny • Temperature: 46 °F (8 °C) • Wind: SW at 4 miles per hour (6.4 km/h)
- Game attendance: 26,147
- Referee: Spencer Mumford
- TV announcers (ESPN+): Trey Bender (play-by-play), Jordan Tripp (analyst) and Kyle Hansen (sideline)

Game information

First quarter

- (08:45) UM - Eli Gillman 4 yd pass from Keali'i Ah Yat, Ty Morrison kick, (15 plays, 72 yards, TOP 06:09; 7-0 Montana)
- (03:49) UM - Drew Deck 4 yd pass from Keali'i Ah Yat, Ty Morrison kick, (10 plays, 40 yards, TOP 03:55; 14-0 Montana)
- (01:20) UM - Michael Wortham 43 yd pass from Keali'i Ah Yat, Brooks Davis rush, (3 plays, 64 yards, TOP 01:02; 22-0 Montana)

Second quarter

- (04:01) SHU - Dean Hangey 3 yd pass from Jack Snyder, Matt Kling kick, (7 plays, 70 yards, TOP 03:17; 22-7 Montana)
- (00:13) UM - Keali'i Ah Yat 3 yd run, Ty Morrison kick, (12 plays, 77 yards, TOP 03:42; 29-7 Montana)

Third quarter

- (09:43) SHU - Mitchell Summers 3 yd run, Matt Kling kick, (10 plays, 75 yards, TOP 05:17; 29-14 Montana)

Fourth quarter

- (06:46) SHU - Dean Hangey 14 yd pass from Jack Snyder, Matt Kling kick, (16 plays, 88 yards, TOP 09:26; 29-21 Montana)
- (05:42) UM - Michael Wortham 51 yd pass from Keali'i Ah Yat, Ty Morrison kick, (3 plays, 68 yards, TOP 00:57; 36-21 Montana)
- (02:52) UM - Korbin Hendrix 49 yd pass from Keali'i Ah Yat, Ty Morrison kick, (3 plays, 60 yards, TOP 00:56; 43-21 Montana)

Statistics	SHU	MONT
First downs	19	23
Plays–yards	64–340	66–484
Rushes–yards	38–126	33–135
Passing yards	214	349
Passing: Comp–Att–Int	20–26–0	27–33–0
Turnovers	0	0
Time of possession	33:39	26:21

Team	Category	Player	Statistics
Sacred Heart	Passing	Jack Snyder	20/26, 214 yards, 2 TD
Sacred Heart	Rushing	Mitchell Summers	18 carries, 87 yards, TD
Sacred Heart	Receiving	Payton Rhoades	6 receptions, 72 yards
Montana	Passing	Keali'i Ah Yat	27/33, 349 yards, 5 TD
Montana	Rushing	Eli Gillman	17 carries, 63 yards
Montana	Receiving	Michael Wortham	7 receptions, 132 yards, 2 TD

=== New Haven ===
New Haven Chargers (4-4) vs. Sacred Heart Pioneers (5-3) – Game summary

Quarter	1	2	3	4	Total
Chargers	3	7	0	10	20
Pioneers	0	14	7	14	35

at Campus Field • Fairfield, CT

- Date: November 1
- Game time: 12:00 PM EDT
- Game attendance: 2,960
- Referee: Travis Barta
- TV announcers (ESPN+): Randy Brochu (play-by-play), Evan Cormier (analyst) and Morgan Bedard (sideline)

Game information

First Quarter

- (01:50) UNH - Liam Quigley 39 yd field goal, (9 plays, 53 yards, TOP 04:14; 3-0 New Haven)

Second Quarter

- (09:43) SHU - Mitchell Summers 6 yd run, Matt Kling kick, (15 plays, 82 yards, TOP 06:59; 7-3 Sacred Heart)
- (05:49) UNH - Jayden Shwed 2 yd run, Liam Quigley kick, (4 plays, 83 yards, TOP 01:34; 10-7 New Haven)
- (00:51) SHU - Mitchell Summers 1 yd run, Matt Kling kick, (11 plays, 75 yards, TOP 04:58; 14-10 Sacred Heart)

Third Quarter

- (08:14) SHU - Chuck Webb 10 yd run, Matt Kling kick, (9 plays, 68 yards, TOP 04:01, 21-10 Sacred Heart)

Fourth Quarter

- (12:39) SHU - Dean Hangey 43 yd pass from Jack Snyder, Matt Kling kick, (1 play, 43 yards, TOP 00:10; 28-10 Sacred Heart)
- (07:28) UNH - Liam Quigley 29 yd field goal, (4 plays, 5 yards, TOP 01:31; 28-13 Sacred Heart)
- (03:16) SHU - Jack Snyder 34 yd run, Matt Kling kick, (9 plays, 75 yards, TOP 04:12; 35-13 Sacred Heart)
- (01:55) UNH - Kevonne Wilder 20 yd pass from AJ Duffy, Liam Quigley kick, (5 plays, 78 yards, TOP 01:15; 35-20 Sacred Heart)

Statistics	NH	SHU
First downs	12	22
Total yards	312	387
Rushing yards	102	229
Passing yards	210	158
Passing: Comp–Att–Int	21-35-1	13-24-0
Time of possession	25:49	34:11

Team	Category	Player	Statistics
New Haven	Passing	AJ Duffy	21/35, 210 yards, 1 TD, 1 INT
New Haven	Rushing	Jalen Smith	9 carries, 102 yards
New Haven	Receiving	Isaac Glaudin	4 receptions, 56 yards
Sacred Heart	Passing	Jack Snyder	13/24, 158 yards, 1 TD
Sacred Heart	Rushing	Mitchell Summers	21 carries, 93 yards, 2 TD
Sacred Heart	Receiving	Dean Hangey	5 receptions, 86 yards, 1 TD

=== VUL (NCCAA) ===
VUL Dragons (NCCAA) (3-7) vs. Sacred Heart Pioneers (6-3) – Game summary

Quarter	1	2	3	4	Total
Dragons (NCCAA)	0	7	0	3	10
Pioneers	21	21	0	14	56

at Campus Field • Fairfield, CT

- Date: November 8
- Game time: 12:00 PM EST
- Game attendance: 4,137
- Referee: Lance Carlen
- TV: ESPN+

Game information

First Quarter

- (09:12) SHU - Mitchell Summers 3 yd run, Matt Kling kick, (9 plays, 56 yards, TOP 04:19; 7-0 Sacred Heart
- (07:15) SHU - Jimmy Casey 8 yd pass from Jack Snyder, Matt Kling kick, (3 plays, 32 yards, TOP 01:16; 14-0 Sacred Heart
- (02:26) SHU - Chuck Webb 3 yd run, Matt Kling kick, (5 plays, 69 yards, TOP 02:26; 21-0 Sacred Heart)

Second Quarter

- (3:01) SHU - Mitchell Summers 4 yd run, Matt Kling kick, (5 plays, 27 yards, TOP 02:48; 28-0 Sacred Heart)
- (07:20) SHU - Trey Eberhart 10 yd run, Ryan Bocklet kick, (6 plays, 61 yards, TOP 03:18; 35-0 Sacred Heart)
- (05:50) VUL - Ryan Sims 44 yd pass from Jabari Ruise, Jacob Briggeman kick, (4 plays, 82 yards, TOP 01:26; 35-7 Sacred Heart)
- (02:56) SHU - Chuck Webb 1 yd run, Ryan Bocklet kick, (4 plays, 54 yards, TOP 02:45; 42-7 Sacred Heart)

Third Quarter

- no scoring

Fourth Quarter

- (11:55) SHU - Curtis Whiting 2 yd run, Ryan Bocklet kick, (5 plays, 48 yards, TOP 04:41; 49-7 Sacred Heart)
- (03:47) SHU - Tom Costigan 59 yd fumble recovery, Ryan Bocklet kick, 56-7 Sacred Heart)
- (00:05) VUL - Jacob Briggeman 29 yd field goal, (11 plays, 62 yards, TOP 03:37; 56-10 Sacred Heart)

Statistics	VUL	SHU
First downs	19	22
Total yards	261	373
Rushing yards	113	294
Passing yards	148	79
Passing: Comp–Att–Int	13-29-2	5-6-0
Time of possession	27:44	32:16

Team	Category	Player	Statistics
VU	Passing	Jabari Ruise	13/29, 148 yards, 1 TD, 2 INT
VU	Rushing	Jacob Newman	21 carries, 110 yards
VU	Receiving	Ryan Sims	7 receptions, 71 yards, 1 TD
Sacred Heart	Passing	Jack Snyder	4/4, 60 yards, 1 TD
Sacred Heart	Rushing	Chuck Webb	7 carries, 90 yards, 2 TD
Sacred Heart	Receiving	Logan Lyson	1 reception, 27 yards

=== Merrimack ===
Merrimack Warriors (3–7) vs. Sacred Heart Pioneers (7–3) – Game summary

Quarter	1	2	3	4	Total
Warriors	7	10	7	13	37
Pioneers	7	7	21	7	42

at Campus Field • Fairfield, CT

- Date: November 15
- Game time: 12:00 PM EST
- Game weather: Sunny • Temperature: 45 °F (7 °C) • Wind: SE at 4 miles per hour (6.4 km/h)
- Game attendance: 3,108
- Referee: Michael Davis
- TV: ESPN+

Game information

First Quarter

- (14:12) MER - Brendon Wyatt 63 yd run, Carlton Thai kick, (2 plays, 75 yards, TOP 00:48; 7-0 Merrimack)
- (02:02) SHU - Jimmy Casey 20 yd pass from Jack Snyder, Matt Kling kick, (6 plays, 74 yards, TOP 03:12; 7-7 Tied)

Second Quarter

- (10:57) MER - Seth Sweitzer 13 yd pass from Ayden Pereira, Carlton Thai kick, (6 plays, 47 yards, TOP 02:58; 14-7 Merrimack)
- (10:15) SHU - Jack Snyder 82 yd run, Matt Kling kick, (1 plays, 72 yards, TOP 00:38; 14-14 Tied)
- (03:42) MER - Carlton Thai 26 yd field goal, (14 plays, 66 yards, TOP 06:33; 17-14 Merrimack)

Third Quarter

- (13:09) SHU - Mitchell Summers 53 yd run, Matt Kling kick, (4 plays, 75 yards, TOP 01:51; 21-17 Sacred Heart)
- (08:11) MER - Ayden Pereira 13 yd run, Carlton Thai kick, (9 plays, 75 yards, TOP 04:58; 24-21 Merrimack)
- (04:03) SHU - Mitchell Summers 1 yd run, Matt Kling kick, (9 plays, 75 yards, TOP 04:08; 28-24 Sacred Heart)
- (00:14) SHU - Trey Eberhart 81 yd run, Matt Kling kick, (3 plays, 92 yards, TOP 01:25; 35-24 Sacred Heart)

Fourth Quarter

- (12:16) MER - Ayden Pereira 26 yd run, two point pass conversion failed, (8 plays, 59 yards, TOP 02:49; 35-30 Sacred Heart)
- (08:55) SHU - Jack Snyder 23 yd run, Matt Kling kick, (7 plays, 52 yards, TOP 03:11; 42-30 Sacred Heart)
- (00:33) MER - DeMarcus McElroy 4 yd pass from Ayden Pereira, Carlton Thai kick, (11 plays, 51 yards, TOP 01:39; 42-37 Sacred Heart)

Statistics	MC	SHU
First downs	29	21
Total yards	499	521
Rushing yards	329	414
Passing yards	170	107
Passing: Comp–Att–Int	20–40–0	9–12–0
Time of possession	32:29	27:31

Team	Category	Player	Statistics
Merrimack	Passing	Ayden Pereira	20/40, 170 yards, 2 TD
Merrimack	Rushing	Ayden Pereira	22 carries, 169 yards, 2 TD
Merrimack	Receiving	Stephon Patrick	2 receptions, 40 yards
Sacred Heart	Passing	Jack Snyder	9/12, 107 yards, TD
Sacred Heart	Rushing	Jack Snyder	8 carries, 163 yards, 2 TD
Sacred Heart	Receiving	Logan Lyson	1 reception, 29 yards

=== at No. 9 Villanova ===
Sacred Heart Pioneers (8–3) at No. 9 Villanova Wildcats (8–2) – Game summary

Quarter	1	2	3	4	Total
Pioneers	3	0	0	7	10
No. 9 Wildcats	7	14	6	7	34

at Villanova Stadium • Villanova, PA

- Date: November 22
- Game time: 1:00 PM EDT
- Game weather: Sunny • Temperature: 52 °F (11 °C) • Wind: NW at 7 miles per hour (11 km/h)
- Game attendance: 4,101
- Referee: Anthony Florio
- TV: FloFootball

Game information

First quarter

- (13:01) SHU - Matt Kling 37 yd field goal, (4 plays, 8 yards, TOP 01:48; 3-0 Sacred Heart)
- (05:02) VILL - Ja'briel Mace 80 yd run, Jack Barnum kick, (1 plays, 80 yards, TOP 00:13; 7-3 Villanova)

Second quarter

- (13:19) VILL - Ja'briel Mace 19 yd run, Jack Barnum kick, (4 plays, 80 yards, TOP 01:41; 14-3 Villanova)
- (00:27) VILL - Ja'briel Mace 10 yd pass from Pat McQuaide, Jack Barnum kick, (14 plays, 80 yards, TOP 03:41; 21-3 Villanova)

Third quarter

- (08:56) VILL - Jack Barnum 27 yd field goal, (10 plays, 44 yards, TOP 05:06; 24-3 Villanova)
- (02:31) VILL - Jack Barnum 29 yd field goal, (5 plays, 56 yards, TOP 03:10 ; 27-3 Villanova)

Fourth quarter

- (13:15) SHU - Jason Palmieri 6 yd pass from Jack Snyder, Matt Kling kick, (9 plays, 78 yards, TOP 04:10; 27-10 Villanova)
- (07:37) VILL - Isaiah Ragland 11 yd pass from Pat McQuaide, Jack Barnum kick, (9 plays, 71 yards, TOP 05:31; 34-10 Villanova)

Statistics	SHU	VILL
First downs	14	19
Plays–yards	65–374	55–455
Rushes–yards	30–88	25–239
Passing yards	286	216
Passing: Comp–Att–Int	28–35–1	18–30–0
Turnovers	1	1
Time of possession	32:57	27:03

Team	Category	Player	Statistics
Sacred Heart	Passing	Jack Snyder	28/35, 286 yards, TD, INT
Sacred Heart	Rushing	Trey Eberhart III	6 carries, 59 yards
Sacred Heart	Receiving	Payton Rhoades	7 receptions, 113 yards
Villanova	Passing	Pat McQuaide	17/29, 216 yards, 2 TD
Villanova	Rushing	Ja'Briel Mace	9 carries, 165 yards, 2 TD
Villanova	Receiving	Chris Colby	5 receptions, 112 yards

== Recruiting class ==
Name	Position	Height	Weight	Hometown	High School
Jackson Babitsky	OL	6-3	265	Hudson, OH	Hudson
Kevin Bright	DL	6-1	251	Baltimore, MD	Dundalk
Ashton Davis	DB	5-10	175	Brandywine, MD	Oxon Hill
Chase DeSanto	OL	6-4	275	Wyoming, PA	Wyoming Area
Steven Dowdy	WR	6-0	168	New York, NY	Iona Prep
Joey Herbert	OL	6-3	270	Chicago, IL	Loyola
Christopher Leggett	TE	6-2	225	New Windsor, NY	Newburgh Free Academy
Dajuan Martin	LB	6-2	208	Pleasantville, NJ	Pleasantville
Naeem Mills	RB	6-0	215	Hamden, CT	Cheshire Academy
