= John Perry (American football, born 1969) =

American football coach (born 1969)

Texas A&M Aggies
- Title: Wide receivers coach

Personal information
- Born: June 4, 1969 (age 57); Lawrence, Massachusetts, U.S.

Career information
- College: New Hampshire

Career history
- Northeastern (1993) Wide receivers coach; Brown (1994–1996) Wide receivers coach; New Hampshire (1997–1998) Wide receivers coach & recruiting coordinator; Dartmouth (1999–2004) Offensive coordinator; Georgetown (2005) Associate head coach & quarterbacks coach; Hofstra (2006) Offensive coordinator; New Hampshire (2007) Associate head coach & quarterbacks coach; Merrimack (2008–2012) Head coach; Delaware (2013) Quarterbacks coach; Houston Texans (2014–2016) Tight ends coach; Houston Texans (2017–2020) Wide receivers coach; Rutgers (2021) Offensive assistant; Sam Houston State (2022) Offensive coordinator; Rutgers (2023–2024) Senior analyst; Texas A&M (2025) Assistant wide receivers coach; Texas A&M (2026–present) Wide receivers coach

Awards and highlights
- NE-10 Championship (2009)

Head coaching record
- Career: 29–21 (.580)

John Perry (born June 4, 1969) is an American college football coach and former player. He is the wide receivers coach for Texas A&M University, a position he has held since 2026. He was hired as the offensive coordinator at Lamar University but resigned prior to the season starting. Perry is a veteran NFL Coach with 7 years of experience. He was previously the WR Coach for the Houston Texans. He coached DeAndre Hopkins to become a 3 Time 1st Team All Pro. Perry was most recently an offensive assistant at Rutgers University. Perry has been connected to some of the most explosive offenses as a collegiate coach. Perry served as the head football coach at Merrimack College in North Andover, Massachusetts from 2008 to 2012, compiling a record of 29–21. He played football and basketball at the University of New Hampshire.

== Head coaching record ==
Year	Team	Overall	Conference	Standing	Bowl/playoffs
Merrimack Warriors (Northeast-10 Conference) (2008–2012)
2008	Merrimack	6–4	4–3	T–3rd	
2009	Merrimack	7–3	6–2	T–1st	
2010	Merrimack	4–6	4–4	5th	
2011	Merrimack	6–4	5–3	T–3rd	
2012	Merrimack	6–4	4–4	5th	
Merrimack:		29–21	23–16		
Total:		29–21			
National championship Conference title Conference division title or championship game berth

== Personal life ==
Perry is the uncle of quarterback, E. J. Perry. He is the older brother of James Perry, who is also a football coach.
