= Mike Gennetti =

American football player and coach (born c. 1981)

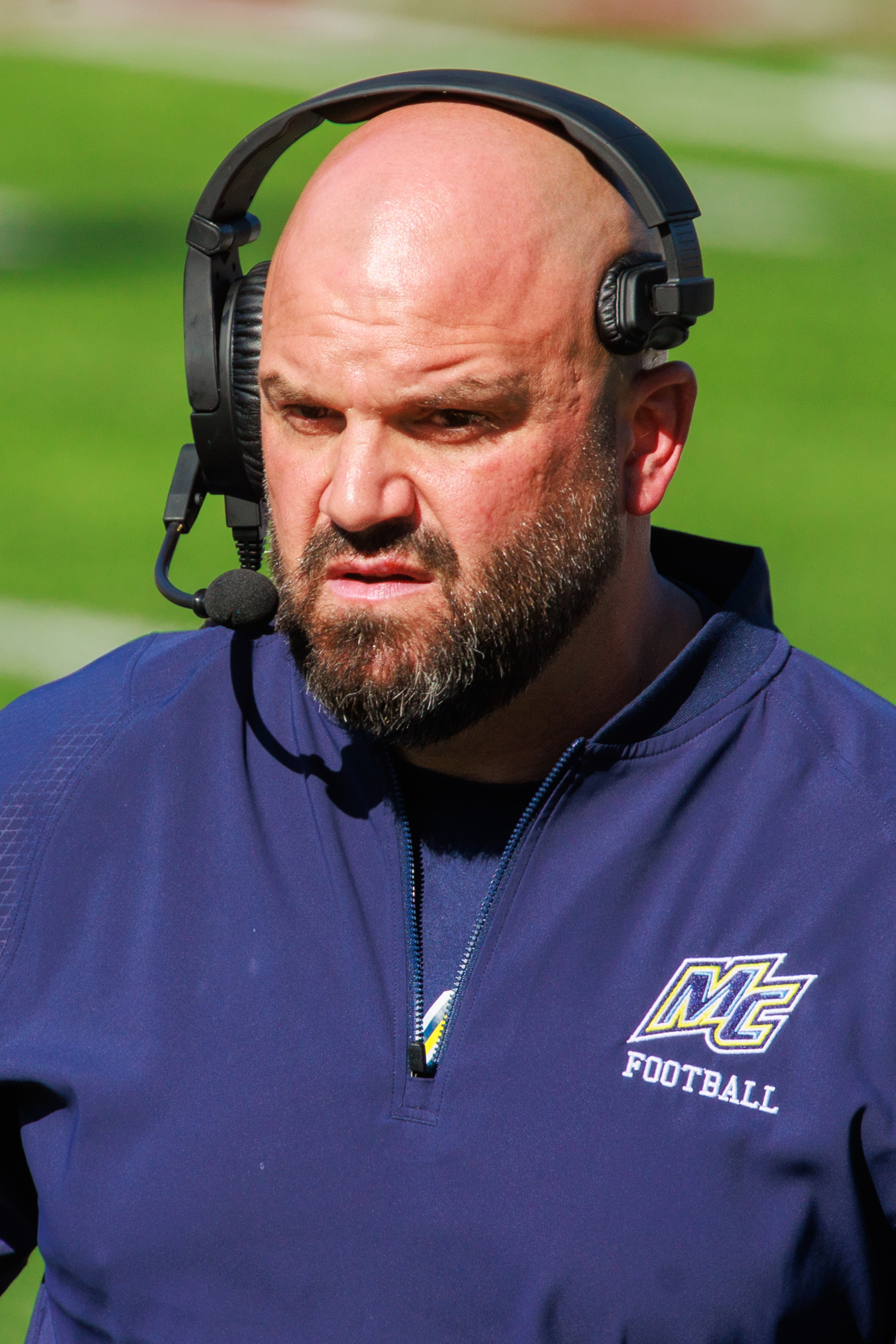
- Gennetti in 2025

Current position
- Title: Head coach
- Team: Merrimack
- Conference: Independent
- Record: 9–15

Biographical details
- Born: c. 1981 (age 44–45); Wilmington, Massachusetts, U.S.
- Education: Worcester State University (2003)

Playing career
- 1999–2002: Worcester State
- Position: Defensive back

Coaching career (HC unless noted)
- 2003–2004: Worcester State (DB/S&C)
- 2005–2010: Merrimack (LB)
- 2011–2012: Merrimack (DC)
- 2013–2023: Merrimack (AHC/DC)
- 2024–present: Merrimack

Head coaching record
- Overall: 9–15

Michael Gennetti (born c. 1981) is an American college football coach and former player. He is the head coach for Merrimack College, a position he has held since 2024. He played college football for the Worcester State Lancers and was an assistant coach for them from 2003 to 2004 before joining Merrimack in 2005. After having been an assistant for the Warriors from 2005 to 2023, he was named the head coach for the 2024 season.

== Early life and education ==
From Wilmington, Massachusetts, Gennetti attended Wilmington High School where he played as the football team's starting running back and linebacker. He was a tri-team captain at Wilmington. He attended Worcester State University and played football for the Lancers, being a four-year starter at defensive back. Gennetti played for them from 1999 to 2002 and placed sixth nationally with eight interceptions in nine games in 2000. He was a first-team all-area selection, was Worcester State's football team captain as a senior in 2002, and was named the school's Senior Male Athlete of the Year.

== Coaching career ==
After his graduation from Worcester State, Gennetti served as an assistant coach at the school for two seasons, being their defensive backs coach and strength and conditioning coach from 2003 to 2004. He coached three players to all-conference honors, helped a player win the conference rookie of the year award in 2003, and helped Worcester State have the top passing defense in NCAA Division III in 2004.

Gennetti was hired as the linebackers coach for the Merrimack Warriors in 2005. He was promoted to defensive coordinator in 2011, and added the role of assistant head coach two years later. During his tenure Merrimack had one of the top defenses in the NE-10, producing multiple all conference and all American players. Merrimack, previously a Division II program, transitioned to Division I FCS in 2019, with Gennetti helping them have one of the top Northeast Conference (NEC) defenses that year. Gennetti’s work on the defensive side of the ball was awarded. When he was named Gridiron Club of Greater Boston Assistant Coach of the Year after the 2022 season. Gennetti's and his staff guided the defense into one of the most successful units in the NEC. With the team finishing first in the country during the 2023 season in third down conversion rate. He was named the interim head coach after Dan Curran resigned following the 2023 season, and several days later was named the team's full-time head coach.

== Personal life ==
Gennnetti currently resides in New Hampshire. He is married to his wife Erin and they have 3 children together, Lily, Jack and Juliana.

== Head coaching record ==
Year	Team	Overall	Conference	Standing	Bowl/playoffs
Merrimack Warriors (NCAA Division I FCS independent) (2024–present)
2024	Merrimack	5–6			
2025	Merrimack	4–8			
2026	Merrimack	0–1			
Merrimack:		9–15			
Total:		9–15			
