= Joseph Altuzarra =

French fashion designer (born 1983)

- Born: 1983 (age 42–43)
- Occupation: Clothing designer
- Relatives: Nick Kroll (cousin-in-law)

Joseph Altuzarra (born 1983) is a French-American luxury women's ready-to-wear clothing designer. He launched his brand, Altuzarra, in New York in 2008. His brand is influenced by his multicultural upbringing and his international education in fashion. His design of a women's evening gown was featured on the runway of the 2019 Met Gala evening.

== Early life and education ==
Altuzarra was born in 1983 in Paris, to a Chinese-American mother and a French father. His parents are both investment bankers. He spent his childhood in Paris’ 7th arrondissement. As a boy he studied ballet for eight years.

Altuzarra graduated from Swarthmore College with a B.A. in art and art history. Upon heading to New York, he interned at Marc Jacobs before his post at Proenza Schouler. Seeking to further enhance his technical construction skills, Altuzarra then apprenticed with patternmaker Nicolas Caïto, the former head of the Rochas atelier. He later returned to Paris, working as first assistant to Givenchy's Riccardo Tisci.

== Altuzarra ==
In its early years, the Altuzarra brand was self-financed with help from Altuzarra’s family; his mother Karen served as the company's CEO. The first collection was picked up by Dover Street Market, Ikram and Barneys New York.

In the following years, Altuzarra collaborated on collections with J. Crew (2012) and Target (2014).

From 2013 to 2020, Kering held a minority stake in the brand.

Since 2017, Altuzarra’s studio has been based in New York's Woolworth Building.

In 2017, Altuzarra announced that it would present its runway show to Paris Fashion Week for the spring 2018 season with plans to show there indefinitely. After showing in Paris for four years, Altuzarra settled back in New York in 2021.

In 2019, Altuzarra's design of a women's all gold, full-length evening gown was worn by Awkwafina at the 2019 Met Gala whom he accompanied on the runway and entrance staircase on the evening of the event.

In September 2020, Altuzarra made a bandana as part of Joe Biden's "Believe in Better" fashion collection, which included collaborations from 18 other fashion designers around the country as part of the Biden's 2020 presidential campaign.

In 2022, Altuzarra launched a second line, Altu.

In 2024, New York-based investment firm P180 took a minority stake in Altuzarra.

Also in 2024, Altuzarra teamed with home furnishings brand Kravet Couture on a collection of home textiles and wall coverings.

== Other activities ==
In 2020, Altuzarra was one of the judges in season 1 of Amazon's Making the Cut.

== Personal life ==
Altuzarra has been married to real estate investor Seth Weissman since 2014. They welcomed their first child, Emma, in 2019.

== Awards ==
Year	Title
2014	CFDA Award
2013	Crain's New York Business 40 Under 40
2013	US Woolmark Prize Winner
2012	CFDA Swarovski Award for Womenswear Design
2012	Forbes 30 Under 30
2011	CFDA/Vogue Fashion Fund Award
2010	Out 100 Vanguard of the Year
2010	Fashion Group International Rising Star of the Year
2010	Ecco Domani Award
