= Tom Caito =

American football coach

Playing career
- c. 1957–1959: Boston University

Coaching career (HC unless noted)
- 1979–1995: Chelmsford HA (MA)
- 1996–2002: Merrimack

Head coaching record
- Overall: 34–33 (college)

Thomas Caito is an American former football coach. He was the first the head football coach at Merrimack College in North Andover, Massachusetts, serving from 1996 to 2002 and compiling a record of 34–33. Before he was hired at Merrimack, Caito was the head football coach at Chelmsford High School in Chelmsford, Massachusetts for 17 years.

== Head coaching record ==
=== College ===
Year	Team	Overall	Conference	Standing	Bowl/playoffs
Merrimack Warriors (Eastern Collegiate Football Conference) (1996)
1996	Merrimack	5–4	5–4	5th	
Merrimack Warriors (Eastern Football Conference) (1997–2000)
1997	Merrimack	3–6	3–5	T–3rd (Bay State)	
1998	Merrimack	3–6	2–6	T–3rd (Bay State)	
1999	Merrimack	7–3	6–3	3rd (Atlantic)	
2000	Merrimack	4–6	4–5	4th (Atlantic)	
Merrimack Warriors (Northeast-10 Conference) (2001–2002)
2001	Merrimack	6–4	6–4	T–4th	
2002	Merrimack	6–4	6–4	4th	
Merrimack:		34–33	32–31		
Total:		34–33			
