= Nicolas Caito =

French patternmaker

- Born: May 16, 1969 (age 56); Lyon (France)
- Occupation: Patternmaker
- Spouse: Camille Caito

Nicolas Caito (born May 16, 1969) is a French patternmaker who works in New York City. According to Elle magazine, he is "New York's most in-demand patternmaker" and is often credited with increasing the level of technical craftsmanship in American fashion to a level formerly seen only in Milan and Paris.

Caito was born and raised in the south of France. His interest in fashion was piqued during his youth when he observed the artistry involved in the construction of luxury clothing while traveling in Italy. He initially planned to enter the business side of fashion, and so in 1989, graduated from the Ecole Superieure de Commerce et de Management, Montpelier, with a degree in international business. After his uncle presented him with the opportunity for an apprenticeship at Lanvin, however, Caito changed career paths.

At Lanvin, Caito spent his first two years sewing linings and pockets as deuxième main. There, he climbed the ranks, eventually becoming première main qualifiée, a position in which he sewed detailed flourishes on the house's clothing.

Caito later moved to Hermès for 18 months, and then to Rochas. At Rochas, he collaborated with designer Olivier Theyskens to develop some of the house's critically lauded designs.

In July 2005, Caito opened his own atelier in New York City. Since then, he has worked with some of New York's most talented designers, including Proenza Schouler, Thakoon, Zac Posen, Calvin Klein Collection and Ralph Lauren. He also appears in the Sundance Channel documentary The Day Before alongside Lazaro Hernandez and Jack McCollough of Proenza Schouler.
