= Duane Stadium =

Multi-purpose stadium in Massachusetts, USA

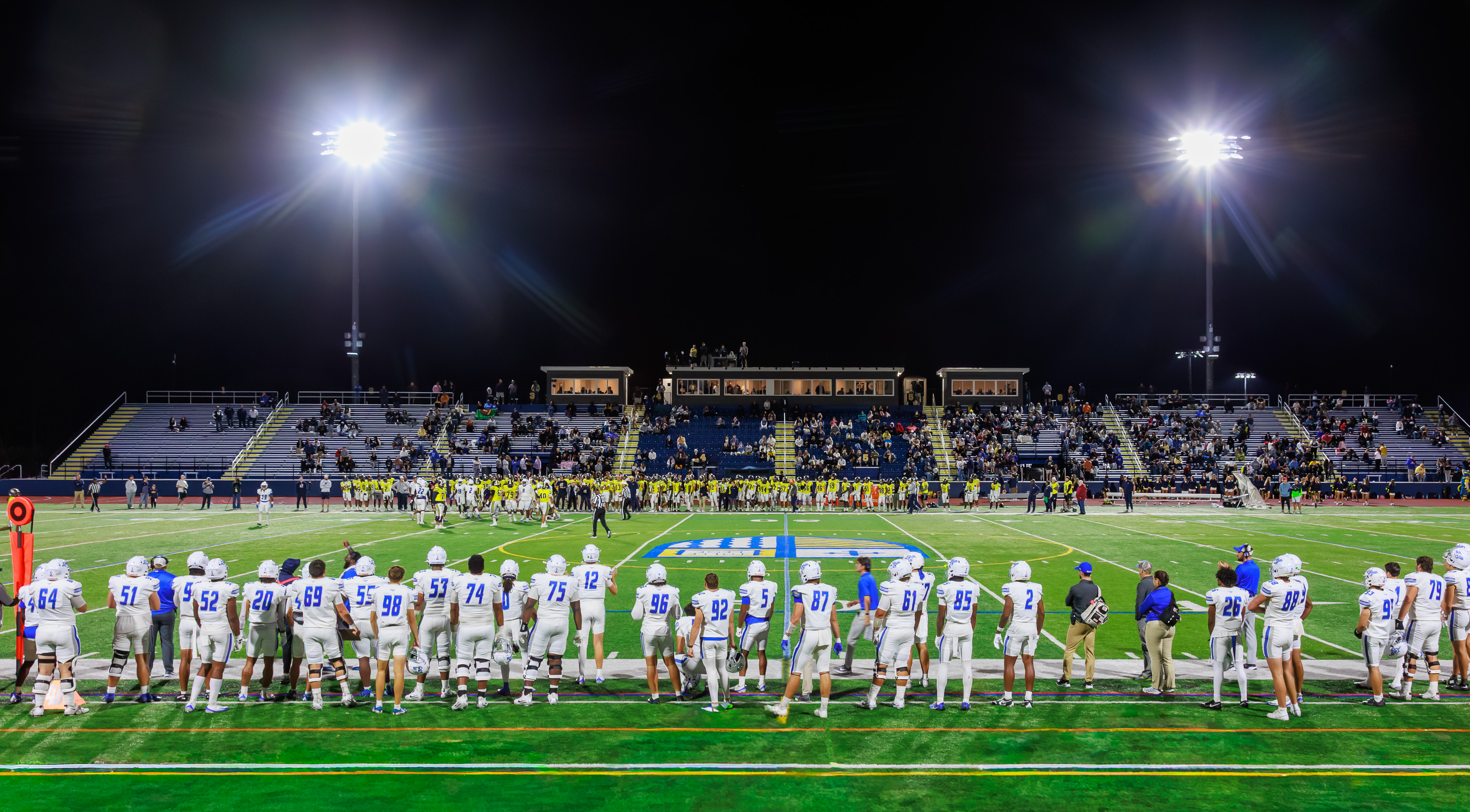
- A night game in 2025
- Interactive map of Duane Stadium
- Location: North Andover, Massachusetts
- Coordinates: 42.6663°N 71.1202°W
- Owner: Merrimack College
- Operator: Merrimack College
- Capacity: 4,000
- Surface: Synthetic turf

Construction
- Opened: October 2017
- Architect: Huntress Sports

Tenant
- Merrimack Warriors (NCAA) (2017–)

Duane Stadium is a 4,000-seat multi-purpose stadium in North Andover, Massachusetts. It is the home of the Merrimack Warriors field hockey, football, lacrosse, and track & field programs. The stadium includes a turf field and an eight-lane track.

The stadium had its grand opening on October 14, 2017 as the Merrimack football team defeated Pace 44–10. At this time the stadium was simply referred to as Warrior Stadium.

The stadium has since been named after Ken and Jincie Duane. Ken was a member of Merrimack's class of 1980 and was on the school's hockey and lacrosse programs. His wife served as a member of board of trustees. The stadium was opened in 2017 for bigger attendance figures as Merrimack’s enrollment began to grow.

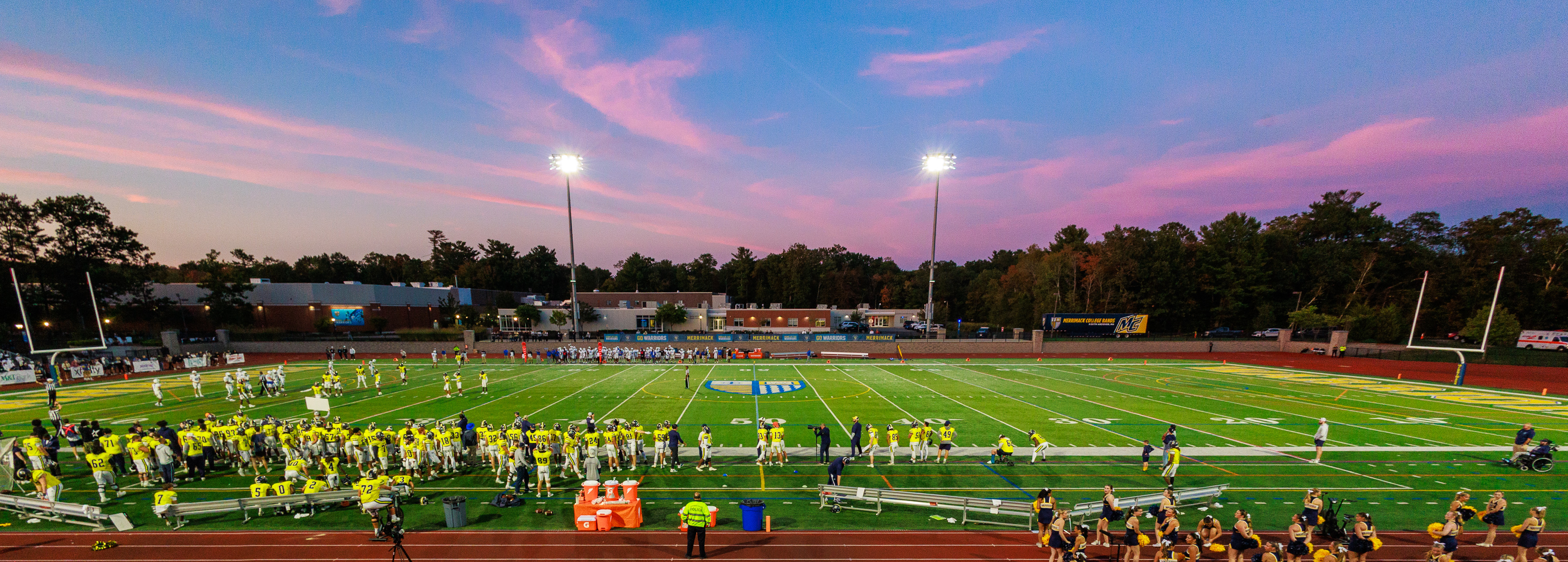
Sunset at Duane Stadium

== Attendance records ==
Rank	Attendance	Date	Game result
1	15,211	September 28, 2024	Dartmouth 16, Merrimack 14
2	13,646	October 7, 2023	Merrimack 45, Stonehill 34
3	12,662	October 1, 2022	Merrimack 24, LIU 23
4	12,147	October 2, 2021	Duquesne 37, Merrimack 14
5	10,172	October 5, 2019	Bryant 24, Merrimack 17
6	8,147	September 2, 2022	Holy Cross 31, Merrimack 17
7	7,019	October 14, 2018	Merrimack 44, Pace 10
8	5,675	September 9, 2022	Merrimack 45, Assumption 17
9	4,819	September 6, 2025	Merrimack 31, St Anselm 6
10	4,129	September 20, 2025	Merrimack 16, Central Connecticut 14
