= Jordan Stevens (American football) =

American football coach (born 1987)

Current position
- Title: Head coach
- Team: Maine
- Conference: CAA
- Record: 16–40

Biographical details
- Born: February 23, 1987 (age 39); Temple, Maine, U.S.

Playing career
- 2006–2009: Maine
- Position: Defensive end

Coaching career (HC unless noted)
- 2011–2013: Maine (assistant DL/LB)
- 2014: Maine (DL)
- 2015–2017: Yale (DL)
- 2018: Yale (AHC/co-DC/LB)
- 2019–2021: Yale (AHC/co-DC/DL)
- 2022–present: Maine

Head coaching record
- Overall: 16–40

Jordan Stevens (born February 23, 1987) is an American college football coach and former player who is the head coach of the Maine Black Bears football team. Originally from Temple, Maine, Stevens attended Mount Blue High School in Farmington before playing defensive end at Maine. After his playing career, he went into coaching. In December 2021, Stevens was named head coach of Maine after several seasons at Yale.

== Head coaching record ==
Year	Team	Overall	Conference	Standing	Bowl/playoffs
Maine Black Bears (Colonial Athletic Association) (2022)
2022	Maine	2–9	2–6	T–10th	
Maine Black Bears (Coastal Athletic Association Football Conference) (2023–present)
2023	Maine	2–9	1–7	13th	
2024	Maine	5–7	3–5	11th	
2025	Maine	6–6	5–3	6th	
2026	Maine	1–9	1–6		
Maine:		16–40	12–27		
Total:		16–40			
