= 2026 Stony Brook Seawolves football team =

American college football season

2026 Stony Brook Seawolves football
- Conference: CAA Football
- Record: 6–6 (4–4 CAA)
- Head coach: Billy Cosh (3rd season)
- Offensive coordinator: Anthony Davis (3rd season)
- Defensive coordinator: Scott Lewis (3rd season)
- Home stadium: Kenneth P. LaValle Stadium

2026 Coastal Athletic Association Football Conference standings
	Conf.			Overall
Team	W		L	W		L
No. 18 Monmouth $^	7	–	0	8	–	3
No. 22 Campbell	5	–	2	8	–	3
Albany	5	–	2	7	–	4
Bryant	5	–	2	7	–	4
North Carolina A&T	4	–	3	5	–	6
Elon	4	–	3	6	–	5
Sacred Heart	4	–	4	4	–	6
Stony Brook	3	–	4	5	–	6
New Hampshire	3	–	4	4	–	7
Towson	3	–	4	3	–	8
Rhode Island	2	–	5	5	–	6
Maine	1	–	6	1	–	9
Hampton	0	–	7	1	–	10
$ – Conference champion; ^ – FCS playoff participant; As of November 22, 2026; Rankings from STATS Poll

The 2026 Stony Brook Seawolves football team represents Stony Brook University as a member of the Coastal Athletic Association Football Conference (CAA) during the 2026 NCAA Division I FCS football season. The Seawolves are led by third-year head coach Billy Cosh. Stony Brook plays their home games at Kenneth P. LaValle Stadium, located in Stony Brook, New York.

== Schedule ==
Date	Time	Opponent	Site	TV	Result	Attendance
August 27	6:00 p.m.	at Delaware State*	Alumni Stadium; Dover, DE	MEAC Network	L 34–41	3,278
September 3	7:00 p.m.	Lindenwood*	Kenneth P. LaValle Stadium; Stony Brook, NY	FloSports	W 36–32	4,383
September 12	2:00 p.m.	at Ball State*	Scheumann Stadium; Muncie, IN	ESPN+	L 17–41	10,390
September 19	2:30 p.m.	No. 8 Rhode Island	Kenneth P. LaValle Stadium; Stony Brook, NY	FloSports	W 56–24	5,632
September 26	1:00 p.m.	at Fordham*	Coffey Field; The Bronx, NY	ESPN+	W 31–16	2,237
October 10	4:00 p.m.	at Towson	Johnny Unitas Stadium; Towson, MD	FloSports	W 31–24	5,308
October 17	2:30 p.m.	Albany^{†}	Kenneth P. LaValle Stadium; Stony Brook, NY (rivalry)	FloSports	L 31–48	6,101
October 24	2:00 p.m.	at Bryant	Beirne Stadium; Smithfield, RI	FloSports	W 27–17	6,427
October 31	12:00 p.m.	Sacred Heart	Kenneth P. LaValle Stadium; Stony Brook, NY	FloSports	L 31–32	1,667
November 7	1:00 p.m.	at No. 16 Campbell	Barker–Lane Stadium; Buies Creek, NC	FloSports	L 35–48	4,020
November 14	1:00 p.m.	at New Hampshire	Wildcat Stadium; Durham, NH	FloSports	L 17–20	3,846
November 21	12:00 p.m.	Hampton	Kenneth P. LaValle Stadium; Stony Brook, NY	FloSports	W 20–10	3,549
*Non-conference game; ^{†}Homecoming; Rankings from STATS Poll released prior to the game; All times are in Eastern time

== Game summaries ==
=== at Delaware State ===
Stony Brook Seawolves (0–0) at Delaware State Hornets (0–0) – Game summary

Quarter	1	2	3	4	Total
Seawolves	6	7	14	7	34
Hornets	10	14	10	7	41

at Alumni Stadium • Dover, DE

- Date: August 27
- Game time: 6:00 p.m. EST
- Game weather: Cloudy • Temperature: 85 °F (29 °C) • Wind: SE at 6 miles per hour (9.7 km/h)
- Game attendance: 3,278
- Referee: Jason Soistman
- TV: MEAC Network

Game information

First quarter

- STBK – DJ Linkins 34-yard pass from Quinn Boyd (Jacob Kirenbring kick failed), 10:27. Seawolves 6–0. Drive: 4 plays, 46 yards, 0:37.
- DSU – Jaylin Terzado 72-yard pass from Ui Ale (Patrick Fisher-Butler kick), 9:21. Hornets 7–6. Drive: 3 plays, 72 yards, 0:59.
- DSU – Patrick Fisher-Butler 41-yard field goal, 1:22. Hornets 10–6. Drive: 12 plays, 51 yards, 6:12.

Second quarter

- DSU – Samari Collier 59-yard run (Patrick Fisher-Butler kick), 13:21. Hornets 17–6. Drive: 4 plays, 71 yards, 1:33.
- DSU – Ui Ale 16-yard run (Patrick Fisher-Butler kick), 10:41. Hornets 24–6. Drive: 2 plays, 18 yards, 0:42.
- STBK – Quinn Boyd 10-yard run (Jacob Krienbring kick), 5:57. Hornets 24–13. Drive: 10 plays, 75 yards, 4:44.

Third quarter

- DSU – Jayden Jenkins 19-yard run (Patrick Fisher-Butler kick), 10:15. Hornets 31–13. Drive: 4 plays, 67 yards, 1:46.
- STBK – Seth Sweitzer 13-yard pass from Quinn Boyd (Jacob Krienbring kick), 6:40. Hornets 31–20. Drive: 9 plays, 66 yards, 3:29.
- DSU – Patrick Fisher-Butler 52-yard field goal, 3:43. Hornets 34–20. Drive: 7 plays, 31 yards, 2:57.
- STBK – CJ Hester 2-yard run (Jacob Krienbring kick), 1:02. Hornets 34–27. Drive: 6 plays, 75 yards, 2:41.

Fourth quarter

- STBK – Keiden Gutierrez 9-yard pass from Quinn Boyd (Jacob Krienbring kick), 11:25. Tied 34–34. Drive: 7 plays, 31 yards, 2:33.
- DSU – Sean Weston Jr. 16-yard run (Patrick Fisher-Butler kick), 1:54. Hornets 41–34. Drive: 11 plays, 80 yards, 5:42.

Statistics	STBK	DSU
First downs	25	20
Plays–yards	76–456	71–514
Rushes–yards	35–133	41–255
Passing yards	323	259
Passing: Comp–Att–Int	22–41–1	18–30–0
Turnovers	2	0
Time of possession	27:56	32:04

Team	Category	Player	Statistics
Stony Brook	Passing	Quinn Boyd	22/41, 323 yards, 3 TD, INT
Stony Brook	Rushing	CJ Hester	18 carries, 91 yards, TD
Stony Brook	Receiving	Seth Sweitzer	5 receptions, 81 yards, TD
Delaware State	Passing	Ui Ale	18/29, 259 yards, TD
Delaware State	Rushing	Ui Ale	8 carries, 82 yards, TD
Delaware State	Receiving	Jaylin Terzado	6 receptions, 149 yards, TD

=== Lindenwood ===
Lindenwood Lions (1–0) at Stony Brook Seawolves (0–1) – Game summary

Quarter	1	2	3	4	Total
Lions	10	12	3	7	32
Seawolves	7	0	10	19	36

at Kenneth P. LaValle Stadium • Stony Brook, NY

- Date: September 3
- Game time: 7:00 p.m. EST
- Game weather: Cloudy • Temperature: 79 °F (26 °C) • Wind: SW at 8 miles per hour (13 km/h)
- Game attendance: 4,383
- Referee: Jay Johnson
- TV: FloSports

Game information

First quarter

- LIN – Will Graham 21-yard field goal, 10:14. Lions 3–0. Drive: 9 plays, 73 yards, 4:40.
- LIN – Pops Battle 24-yard run (Will Graham kick), 8:14. Lions 10–0. Drive: 2 plays, 24 yards, 0:33.
- STBK – Keiden Gutierrez 28-yard pass from Quinn Boyd (Michael Mannino kick), 5:25. Lions 10–7. Drive: 7 plays, 75 yards, 2:49.

Second quarter

- LIN – Pops Battle 26-yard run (Will Graham kick), 14:54. Lions 17–7. Drive: 10 plays, 82 yards, 5:26.
- LIN – Will Graham 50-yard field goal, 7:12. Lions 20–7. Drive: 9 plays, 33 yards, 3:45.
- LIN – Team safety, 5:02. Lions 22–7.

Third quarter

- STBK – Seth Sweitzer 29-yard pass from Quinn Boyd (Michael Mannino kick), 8:29. Lions 22–14. Drive: 7 plays, 82 yards, 2:10.
- LIN – Will Graham 38-yard field goal, 5:05. Lions 25–14. Drive: 9 plays, 52 yards, 3:21.
- STBK – Michael Mannino 33-yard field goal, 1:51. Lions 25–17. Drive: 8 plays, 29 yards, 3:05.

Fourth quarter

- STBK – CJ Hester 52-yard run (pass failed), 14:52. Lions 25–23. Drive: 3 plays, 59 yards, 0:33.
- LIN – Jared Rhodes 1-yard run (Will Graham kick), 12:47. Lions 32–23. Drive: 5 plays, 74 yards, 2:05.
- STBK – CJ Hester 5-yard run (Michael Mannino kick), 12:11. Lions 32–30. Drive: 2 plays, 60 yards, 0:26.
- STBK – Quinn Boyd 8-yard run (pass failed), 7:39. Seawolves 36–32. Drive: 8 plays, 71 yards, 3:28.

Statistics	LIN	STBK
First downs	22	22
Plays–yards	71–364	64–402
Rushes–yards	43–155	29–104
Passing yards	209	298
Passing: Comp–Att–Int	19–28–0	27–35–0
Turnovers	0	0
Time of possession	32:31	26:46

Team	Category	Player	Statistics
Lindenwood	Passing	Pops Battle	19/28, 209 yards
Lindenwood	Rushing	Jared Rhodes	16 carries, 59 yards, TD
Lindenwood	Receiving	Drew Krobath	5 receptions, 81 yards
Stony Brook	Passing	Quinn Boyd	27/35, 298 yards, 2 TD
Stony Brook	Rushing	CJ Hester	14 carries, 95 yards, 2 TD
Stony Brook	Receiving	Seth Sweitzer	12 receptions, 157 yards, TD

=== at Ball State (FBS) ===
Stony Brook Seawolves (1–1) at Ball State Cardinals (FBS) (0–1) – Game summary

Quarter	1	2	3	4	Total
Seawolves	0	3	0	14	17
Cardinals (FBS)	7	14	0	20	41

at Scheumann Stadium • Muncie, IN

- Date: September 12
- Game time: 2:00 p.m. EST
- Game weather: Rain • Temperature: 76 °F (24 °C) • Wind: SW at 8 miles per hour (13 km/h)
- Game attendance: 10,390
- Referee: Matt Packowski
- TV announcers (ESPN+): Kelsie Kaspar and Jay Sonnhalter

Game information

First quarter

- BALL – Tate Hoover 3-yard pass from Keldric Luster (Brody Boehm kick), 1:41. Cardinals 7–0. Drive: 9 plays, 66 yards, 4:35.

Second quarter

- BALL – Jabari Smith 23-yard pass from Keldric Luster (Brody Boehm kick), 9:23. Cardinals 14–0. Drive: 8 plays, 70 yards, 4:20.
- BALL – Jalen Bonds 23-yard pass from Keldric Luster (Brody Boehm kick), 6:03. Cardinals 21–0. Drive: 2 plays, 24 yards, 0:46.
- STBK – Michael Mannino 45-yard field goal, 3:05. Cardinals 21–3. Drive: 8 plays, 48 yards, 2:58.

Third quarter

- No scoring plays.

Fourth quarter

- BALL – Brody Boehm 38-yard field goal, 10:36. Cardinals 24–3. Drive: 15 plays, 60 yards, 8:00.
- BALL – Brody Boehm 30-yard field goal, 6:00. Cardinals 27–3. Drive: 7 plays, 30 yards, 3:02.
- STBK – Jeremiah Coney 3-yard run (Rayden Aphayvong–Quinn Boyd pass), 3:18. Cardinals 27–11. Drive: 7 plays, 75 yards, 2:42.
- BALL – Jalen Bonds 49-yard run (Brody Boehm kick), 3:03. Cardinals 34–11. Drive: 2 plays, 50 yards, 0:15.
- STBK – Jeremiah Coney 66-yard run (pass failed), 2:26. Cardinals 34–17. Drive: 3 plays, 75 yards, 0:37.
- BALL – TJ Horton 54-yard run (Brody Boehm kick), 2:17. Cardinals 41–17. Drive: 1 play, 54 yards, 0:09.

Statistics	STBK	BALL
First downs	15	23
Plays–yards	64–330	68–482
Rushes–yards	28–183	36–226
Passing yards	147	256
Passing: comp–att–int	22–36–2	27–32–1
Turnovers	2	1
Time of possession	26:53	33:07

Team	Category	Player	Statistics
Stony Brook	Passing	Quinn Boyd	22/35, 147 yards, 2 INT
Stony Brook	Rushing	Jeremiah Coney	9 carries, 89 yards, 2 TD
Stony Brook	Receiving	Seth Sweitzer	7 receptions, 50 yards
Ball State	Passing	Keldric Luster	27/32, 256 yards, 3 TD, INT
Ball State	Rushing	TJ Horton	9 carries, 125 yards, TD
Ball State	Receiving	Jabari Smith	6 receptions, 72 yards, TD

=== No. 8 Rhode Island ===
No. 8 Rhode Island Rams (2–1) at Stony Brook Seawolves (1–2) – Game summary

Quarter	1	2	3	4	Total
No. 8 Rams	-	-	-	-	0
Seawolves	-	-	-	-	0

at Kenneth P. LaValle Stadium • Stony Brook, NY

- Date: September 19
- Game time: 2:30 p.m. EST
- TV: FloSports

Game information

First quarter
Second quarter
Third quarter
Fourth quarter

Statistics	URI	STBK
First downs		
Plays–yards		
Rushes–yards		
Passing yards		
Passing: Comp–Att–Int		
Turnovers		
Time of possession		

Team	Category	Player	Statistics
Rhode Island	Passing		
Rhode Island	Rushing		
Rhode Island	Receiving		
Stony Brook	Passing		
Stony Brook	Rushing		
Stony Brook	Receiving		

=== at Fordham ===
Stony Brook Seawolves (2–2) at Fordham Rams (1–3) – Game summary

Quarter	1	2	3	4	Total
Seawolves	7	14	0	10	31
Rams	7	6	3	0	16

at Coffey Field • The Bronx, NY

- Date: September 26
- Game time: 1:00 p.m. EST
- Game weather: Cloudy • Temperature: 58 °F (14 °C) • Wind: NE at 8 miles per hour (13 km/h)
- Game attendance: 2,237
- Referee: Anthony Florio
- TV announcers (ESPN+): Andrew Bogusch (play-by-play) and Andrew Posadas (analyst)

Game information

First quarter

- STBK – CJ Hester 5-yard run (Michael Mannino kick), 9:36. Seawolves 7–0. Drive: 11 plays, 70 yards, 5:24.
- FOR – Jamell James 54-yard run (Bennett Henderson kick), 5:49. Tied 7–7. Drive: 7 plays, 74 yards, 3:41.

Second quarter

- STBK – Rayden Aphayvong 15-yard pass from Quinn Boyd (Michael Mannino kick), 10:11. Seawolves 14–7. Drive: 4 plays, 38 yards, 0:56.
- FOR – Gunnar Smith 34-yard run (Bennett Henderson PAT failed), 5:50. Seawolves 14–13. Drive: 8 plays, 75 yards, 4:21.
- STBK – CJ Hester 7-yard run (Michael Mannino kick), 0:38. Seawolves 21–13. Drive: 12 plays, 80 yards, 3:50.

Third quarter

- FOR – Bennett Henderson 37-yard field goal, 5:28. Seawolves 21–16. Drive: 10 plays, 30 yards, 4:42.

Fourth quarter

- STBK – Michael Mannino 30-yard field goal, 13:34. Seawolves 24–16. Drive: 7 plays, 53 yards, 3:02.
- FOR – CJ Hester 11-yard run (Michael Mannino kick), 8:00. Seawolves 31–16. Drive: 7 plays, 47 yards, 3:14.

Statistics	STBK	FOR
First downs	19	14
Plays–yards	69–396	58–314
Rushes–yards	43–187	35–169
Passing yards	209	145
Passing: Comp–Att–Int	20–26–0	15–23–1
Turnovers	1	2
Time of possession	31:38	28:22

Team	Category	Player	Statistics
Stony Brook	Passing	Quinn Boyd	20/26, 209 yards, TD
Stony Brook	Rushing	CJ Hester	28 carries, 135 yards, 3 TD
Stony Brook	Receiving	DJ Linkins	5 receptions, 81 yards
Fordham	Passing	Gunnar Smith	15/23, 145 yards, INT
Fordham	Rushing	Jamell James	14 carries, 114 yards, TD
Fordham	Receiving	Ricky Gonzalez II	3 receptions, 67 yards

=== at Towson ===
Stony Brook Seawolves (3–2) at Towson Tigers (0–6) – Game summary

Quarter	1	2	3	4	Total
Seawolves	-	-	-	-	0
Tigers	-	-	-	-	0

at Johnny Unitas Stadium • Towson, MD

- Date: October 10
- Game time: 4:00 p.m. EST
- TV: FloSports

Game information

First quarter
Second quarter
Third quarter
Fourth quarter

Statistics	STBK	TOW
First downs		
Plays–yards		
Rushes–yards		
Passing yards		
Passing: Comp–Att–Int		
Turnovers		
Time of possession		

Team	Category	Player	Statistics
Stony Brook	Passing		
Stony Brook	Rushing		
Stony Brook	Receiving		
Towson	Passing		
Towson	Rushing		
Towson	Receiving		

=== Albany (rivalry) ===
Albany Great Danes (3–3) at Stony Brook Seawolves (4–2) – Game summary

Quarter	1	2	3	4	Total
Great Danes	-	-	-	-	0
Seawolves	-	-	-	-	0

at Kenneth P. LaValle Stadium • Stony Brook, NY

- Date: October 17
- Game time: 2:30 p.m. EST
- TV: FloSports

Game information

First quarter
Second quarter
Third quarter
Fourth quarter

Statistics	ALB	STBK
First downs		
Plays–yards		
Rushes–yards		
Passing yards		
Passing: Comp–Att–Int		
Turnovers		
Time of possession		

Team	Category	Player	Statistics
Albany	Passing		
Albany	Rushing		
Albany	Receiving		
Stony Brook	Passing		
Stony Brook	Rushing		
Stony Brook	Receiving		

=== at Bryant ===
Stony Brook Seawolves (4–3) at Bryant Bulldogs (5–2) – Game summary

Quarter	1	2	3	4	Total
Seawolves	-	-	-	-	0
Bulldogs	-	-	-	-	0

at Beirne Stadium • Smithfield, RI

- Date: October 24
- Game time: 2:00 p.m. EST
- TV: FloSports

Game information

First quarter
Second quarter
Third quarter
Fourth quarter

Statistics	STBK	BRY
First downs		
Plays–yards		
Rushes–yards		
Passing yards		
Passing: Comp–Att–Int		
Turnovers		
Time of possession		

Team	Category	Player	Statistics
Stony Brook	Passing		
Stony Brook	Rushing		
Stony Brook	Receiving		
Bryant	Passing		
Bryant	Rushing		
Bryant	Receiving		

=== Sacred Heart ===
Sacred Heart Pioneers (3–4) at Stony Brook Seawolves (5–3) – Game summary

Quarter	1	2	3	4	Total
Pioneers	-	-	-	-	0
Seawolves	-	-	-	-	0

at Kenneth P. LaValle Stadium • Stony Brook, NY

- Date: October 31
- Game time: 12:00 p.m. EST
- TV: FloSports

Game information

First quarter
Second quarter
Third quarter
Fourth quarter

Statistics	SHU	STBK
First downs		
Plays–yards		
Rushes–yards		
Passing yards		
Passing: Comp–Att–Int		
Turnovers		
Time of possession		

Team	Category	Player	Statistics
Sacred Heart	Passing		
Sacred Heart	Rushing		
Sacred Heart	Receiving		
Stony Brook	Passing		
Stony Brook	Rushing		
Stony Brook	Receiving		

=== at No. 16 Campbell ===
Stony Brook Seawolves (5–4) at No. 16 Campbell Fighting Camels (7–2) – Game summary

Quarter	1	2	3	4	Total
Seawolves	-	-	-	-	0
No. 16 Fighting Camels	-	-	-	-	0

at Barker–Lane Stadium • Buies Creek, NC

- Date: November 7
- Game time: 1:00 p.m. EST
- TV: FloSports

Game information

First quarter
Second quarter
Third quarter
Fourth quarter

Statistics	STBK	CAM
First downs		
Plays–yards		
Rushes–yards		
Passing yards		
Passing: Comp–Att–Int		
Turnovers		
Time of possession		

Team	Category	Player	Statistics
Stony Brook	Passing		
Stony Brook	Rushing		
Stony Brook	Receiving		
Campbell	Passing		
Campbell	Rushing		
Campbell	Receiving		

=== at New Hampshire ===
Stony Brook Seawolves (5–5) at New Hampshire Wildcats (3–7) – Game summary

Quarter	1	2	3	4	Total
Seawolves	-	-	-	-	0
Wildcats	-	-	-	-	0

at Wildcat Stadium • Durham, NH

- Date: November 14
- Game time: 1:00 p.m. EST
- TV: FloSports

Game information

First quarter
Second quarter
Third quarter
Fourth quarter

Statistics	STBK	UNH
First downs		
Plays–yards		
Rushes–yards		
Passing yards		
Passing: Comp–Att–Int		
Turnovers		
Time of possession		

Team	Category	Player	Statistics
Stony Brook	Passing		
Stony Brook	Rushing		
Stony Brook	Receiving		
New Hampshire	Passing		
New Hampshire	Rushing		
New Hampshire	Receiving		

=== Hampton ===
Hampton Pirates (1–10) at Stony Brook Seawolves (5–6) – Game summary

Quarter	1	2	3	4	Total
Pirates	-	-	-	-	0
Seawolves	-	-	-	-	0

at Kenneth P. LaValle Stadium • Stony Brook, NY

- Date: November 21
- Game time: 12:00 p.m. EST
- TV: FloSports

Game information

First quarter
Second quarter
Third quarter
Fourth quarter

Statistics	HAMP	STBK
First downs		
Plays–yards		
Rushes–yards		
Passing yards		
Passing: Comp–Att–Int		
Turnovers		
Time of possession		

Team	Category	Player	Statistics
Hampton	Passing		
Hampton	Rushing		
Hampton	Receiving		
Stony Brook	Passing		
Stony Brook	Rushing		
Stony Brook	Receiving		

== Rankings ==
Ranking movements Legend: ██ Increase in ranking ██ Decrease in ranking — = Not ranked RV = Received votes
	Week														
Poll	Pre	1	2	3	4	5	6	7	8	9	10	11	12	13	Final
STATS	—	—	—	—	RV	RV	RV	RV	—	RV					
Coaches	RV	—	—	—	RV	RV	RV	RV	—	RV					

== Offseason ==
=== Transfers ===
==== Outgoing ====
Player	Position	Destination
Jayce Freeman	WR	Temple
Brooks Martin	DB	VMI
AJ Roberts	LB	Unknown
Sebastian Regis	DL	Withdrawn

==== Incoming ====
Player	Position	Previous school
Aidan Leffler	QB	Ball State
Reggie Darkah	DL	Central Connecticut
Ryan Barrett	DB	East Tennessee State
Jack Melore	WR	Marist
Seth Sweitzer	WR	Merrimack
CJ Hester	RB	Michigan
Lance Byndon	EDGE	Morgan State
Quinn Kelly	LS	Northern Illinois
Gene Calgaro	LB	Saint Francis
Connor Van Tassell	OL	Saint Francis
D. J. Linkins	WR	Tennessee Tech
CJ Hester	RB	UMass
Jeremiah Coney	RB	Virginia Tech
