= 2026 Maine Black Bears football team =

American college football season

2026 Maine Black Bears football
- Conference: CAA Football Conference
- Record: 1–10 (1–7 CAA)
- Head coach: Jordan Stevens (5th season)
- Offensive coordinator: Mikahael Waters (3rd season)
- Defensive coordinator: Umberto Di Meo (3rd season)
- Home stadium: Alfond Stadium

2026 Coastal Athletic Association Football Conference standings
| | Conf. | | | Overall |
| Team | W | | L | W | | L |
|---|---|---|---|---|---|---|
| No. 18 Monmouth $^ | 8 | – | 0 | 9 | – | 3 |
| Bryant | 6 | – | 2 | 8 | – | 4 |
| Albany | 6 | – | 2 | 8 | – | 4 |
| No. 22 Campbell | 5 | – | 3 | 8 | – | 4 |
| North Carolina A&T | 4 | – | 4 | 5 | – | 7 |
| Towson | 4 | – | 4 | 4 | – | 8 |
| Sacred Heart | 4 | – | 4 | 5 | – | 6 |
| New Hampshire | 4 | – | 4 | 5 | – | 7 |
| Stony Brook | 4 | – | 4 | 6 | – | 6 |
| Elon | 4 | – | 4 | 6 | – | 6 |
| Rhode Island | 2 | – | 6 | 5 | – | 7 |
| Maine | 1 | – | 7 | 1 | – | 10 |
| Hampton | 0 | – | 8 | 1 | – | 11 |
$ – Conference champion; ^ – FCS playoff participant; As of November 22, 2026; Rankings from STATS Poll

The 2026 Maine Black Bears football team represented the University of Maine as a member of the Coastal Athletic Association Football Conference (CAA) in the 2026 NCAA Division I FCS football season. The Black Bears were led by fifth-year head coach Jordan Stevens and played their home games at Alfond Stadium in Orono, Maine.

== Transfers ==
=== Outgoing ===
Over the off-season, Maine lost twenty players through the transfer portal. Seventeen committed to a new school.

| Name | Pos. | New school |
|---|---|---|
| Sincere Baines | RB | Western Kentucky |
| Landon Beal | LS | Ohio State |
| Joey Bryson | K | Incarnate Word |
| Na'Cire Christmas | CB | Stonehill |
| Jordon Crawford | DT | Unknown |
| Nicolas Cruji | OL | Charlotte |
| Lawson Foley | LB | Assumption |
| Luke Grigson | TE | Western Illinois |
| Brayden Holmes | CB | Valdosta State |
| Sherrod Hudson | LB/S | Delaware State |
| Nicolas Kalume | DE | Arkansas State |
| Jake Kucera | TE | Fordham |
| Jaedin Lee | DT | Rutgers |
| Francisco Pratts III | TE | Tennessee State |
| Elias Sherman | DT | Arkansas State |
| Ja'Darius Steele | S | Unknown |
| Blake Thomas | WR | West Chester |
| Jared Tynes | LB | Unknown |
| Corey Wilson | DB | Virginia Union |
| Devin Vaught | S | Michigan State |

=== Incoming ===
Over the off-season, Maine added fifteen players through the transfer portal.

| Name | Pos. | Class | Previous school |
|---|---|---|---|
| Omar Aboutoui | K | Jr | Curry |
| Elijah Alvarado | LB | R-So | Reedley C.C. |
| Derek Berlitz | DT | R-Sr | CCSU |
| Keyon Concepcion | WR | R-So | Concord |
| Nate Gunderson | LB | R-So | Dodge City C.C. |
| Jeremiah Harris | S | So | Saint Francis |
| Isaiah Jones | TE | R-So | Southwest Mississippi C.C. |
| Jeremiah McGill | S | Gr | UMass |
| Malik McNeely | WR | Jr | VMI |
| Justin Mucerino | LS | R-So | Dodge City C.C. |
| Alex Nash-Lally | CB | So | Delaware |
| Ronalon Renwick | S | Fr | Air Force |
| Samuel Trejo | DT | R-So | Reedley C.C. |
| Amahj Walker | CB | R-Jr | Lackawanna C.C. |
| Ervin Wiggins | CB | So | Albany |
| Tyreek Wood | TE | Jr | Morgan State |

== Schedule ==
| Date | Time | Opponent | Site | TV | Result | Attendance |
|---|---|---|---|---|---|---|
| August 27 | 6:00 p.m. | at Towson | Johnny Unitas Stadium; Towson, MD | FloSports | W 21–18 | 4,642 |
| September 5 | 3:30 p.m. | at Appalachian State* | Kidd Brewer Stadium; Boone, NC | ESPN+ | L 3–55 | 33,664 |
| September 12 | 5:00 p.m. | Merrimack* | Alfond Stadium; Orono, ME | FloSports | L 14–23 | 5,065 |
| September 19 | 2:00 p.m. | at Boston College* | Alumni Stadium; Chestnut Hill, MA | ACCNX | L 16–22 | 35,605 |
| September 26 | 2:00 p.m. | at Elon | Rhodes Stadium; Elon, NC | FloSports | L 17–43 | 11,309 |
| October 3 | 3:30 p.m. | Sacred Heart | Alfond Stadium; Orono, ME | FloSports | L 16–24 | 5,466 |
| October 17 | 1:00 p.m. | Bryant | Alfond Stadium; Orono, ME | FloSports | L 14–17 | 3,455 |
| October 24 | 1:00 p.m. | No. 13 Campbell^{†} | Alfond Stadium; Orono, ME | FloSports | L 6–35 | 4,629 |
| October 31 | 12:00 p.m. | at Rhode Island | Centreville Bank Stadium; Pawtucket, RI | FloSports | L 13–14 ^{OT} | 3,056 |
| November 14 | 12:00 p.m. | at Albany | Tom & Mary Casey Stadium; Albany, NY | FloSports | L 3–37 | 3,034 |
| November 21 | 1:00 p.m. | New Hampshire | Alfond Stadium; Orono, ME (rivalry) | FloSports | L 21–24 | 3,103 |
*Non-conference game; ^{†}Homecoming; Rankings from STATS Poll released prior to the game; All times are in Eastern time

== Game summaries ==
=== at Towson ===
Maine Black Bears (0–0) at Towson Tigers (0–0) – Game summary

| Quarter | 1 | 2 | 3 | 4 | Total |
|---|---|---|---|---|---|
| Black Bears | 0 | 21 | 0 | 0 | 21 |
| Tigers | 0 | 8 | 7 | 3 | 18 |

at Johnny Unitas Stadium • Towson, Maryland

- Date: August 27
- Game time: 6:00 p.m. EST
- Game weather: Sunny
- Game attendance: 4,642
- TV announcers (FloSports): Spiro Morekas and Gordy Combs

Game information

First quarter

- No scoring plays.

Second quarter

- ME – Malik McNeely 16-yard pass from Eddie Buehler (Samuel Tremblay kick), 8:38. Black Bears 7–0. Drive: 8 plays, 52 yards, 4:42.
- ME – Rashawn Marshall 32-yard run (Samuel Tremblay kick), 2:38. Black Bears 14–0. Drive: 7 plays, 90 yards, 4:09.
- ME – Nick Laughlin 30-yard pass from Eddie Buehler (Samuel Tremblay kick), 0:42. Black Bears 21–0. Drive: 2 plays, 35 yards, 0:23.
- TOW – Aaron Enterline 4-yard pass from Andrew Indorf (Andrew Indorf–Aaron Enterline pass), 0:11. Black Bears 21–8. Drive: 3 plays, 68 yards, 0:24.

Third quarter

- TOW – Cleveland Charlton 59-yard pass from Andrew Indorf (Zaydaan Faridi kick), 5:11. Black Bears 21–15. Drive: 2 plays, 62 yards, 0:42.

Fourth quarter

- TOW – Zaydaan Faridi 39-yard field goal, 12:18. Black Bears 21–18. Drive: 11 plays, 60 yards, 5:08.

| Statistics | ME | TOW |
|---|---|---|
| First downs | 16 | 16 |
| Plays–yards | 60–329 | 62–379 |
| Rushes–yards | 33–130 | 41–112 |
| Passing yards | 199 | 267 |
| Passing: comp–att–int | 17–27–0 | 15–21–1 |
| Turnovers | 0 | 2 |
| Time of possession | 30:33 | 29:27 |

| Team | Category | Player | Statistics |
|---|---|---|---|
| Maine | Passing | Eddie Buehler | 17/27, 199 yards, 2 TD |
| Maine | Rushing | Rashawn Marshall | 13 carries, 81 yards, TD |
| Maine | Receiving | Evan Wallace | 3 receptions, 43 yards |
| Towson | Passing | Andrew Indorf | 15/21, 267 yards, 2 TD, INT |
| Towson | Rushing | Kemarrion Battles | 18 carries, 89 yards |
| Towson | Receiving | Cleveland Charlton | 4 receptions, 136 yards, TD |

=== at Appalachian State (FBS) ===
Maine Black Bears (1–0) at Appalachian State Mountaineers (FBS) (0–0) – Game summary

| Quarter | 1 | 2 | 3 | 4 | Total |
|---|---|---|---|---|---|
| Black Bears | 0 | 0 | 3 | 0 | 3 |
| Mountaineers (FBS) | 7 | 24 | 7 | 17 | 55 |

at Kidd Brewer Stadium • Boone, North Carolina

- Date: September 5
- Game time: 3:30 p.m. EDT
- Game weather: Cloudy
- Game attendance: 33,664
- Referee: Scott Broadway
- TV: ESPN+

Game information

First quarter

- (6:10) APP – Treyaun Webb 2-yard run, James London kick (Drive: 4 plays, 78 yards, 1:26; Appalachian State 7–0)

Second quarter

- (14:15) APP – James London 31-yard field goal (Drive: 10 plays, 74 yards, 5:21; Appalachian State 10–0)
- (9:32) APP – Darrin Fugitt 5-yard pass from Malachi Singleton, James London kick (Drive: 6 plays, 70 yards, 3:04; Appalachian State 17–0)
- (4:18) APP – Sam Pickett III 14-yard pass from Malachi Singleton, James London kick (Drive: 8 plays, 40 yards, 4:24; Appalachian State 24–0)
- (0:07) APP – Sam Pickett III 7-yard pass from Malachi Singleton, James London kick (Drive: 6 plays, 55 yards, 1:03; Appalachian State 31–0)

Third quarter

- (9:14) APP – Jaquari Lewis 12-yard run, James London kick (Drive: 7 plays, 69 yards, 2:38; Appalachian State 38–0)
- (0:51) ME – Samuel Tremblay 40-yard field goal (Drive: 18 plays, 52 yards, 8:23; Appalachian State 38–3)

Fourth quarter

- (13:25) APP – Nate Branch 36-yard run, James London kick (Drive: 8 plays, 75 yards, 2:26; Appalachian State 45–3)
- (10:33) APP – Jackson Grier 28-yard run, Andrew Cummings kick (Drive: 3 plays, 68 yards, 1:16; Appalachian State 52–3)
- (2:12) APP – James London 32-yard field goal (Drive: 11 plays, 56 yards, 5:45; Appalachian State 55–3)

| Statistics | ME | APP |
|---|---|---|
| First downs | 12 | 34 |
| Plays–yards | 60–250 | 72–647 |
| Rushes–yards | 28–52 | 39–299 |
| Passing yards | 198 | 348 |
| Passing: comp–att–int | 18–32–2 | 29–33–0 |
| Turnovers | 2 | 1 |
| Time of possession | 26:51 | 33:09 |

| Team | Category | Player | Statistics |
|---|---|---|---|
| Maine | Passing | Eddie Buehler | 18/32, 198 yards, 2 INT |
| Maine | Rushing | Rashawn Marshall | 13 carries, 37 yards |
| Maine | Receiving | Corey Rideout | 1 reception, 47 yards |
| Appalachian State | Passing | Malachi Singleton | 22/24, 291 yards, 3 TD |
| Appalachian State | Rushing | Jaquari Lewis | 11 carries, 69 yards, TD |
| Appalachian State | Receiving | Sam Pickett III | 5 receptions, 76 yards, 2 TD |

=== Merrimack ===
Merrimack Warriors (0–2) at Maine Black Bears (1–1) – Game summary

| Quarter | 1 | 2 | 3 | 4 | Total |
|---|---|---|---|---|---|
| Warriors | 0 | 0 | 0 | 0 | 0 |
| Black Bears | 0 | 0 | 0 | 0 | 0 |

at Alfond Sports Stadium • Orono, Maine

- Date: September 12
- Game time: 5:00 p.m. EST
- TV announcers (FloSports): TBD

Game information

First quarter
Second quarter
Third quarter
Fourth quarter

| Statistics | MRMK | ME |
|---|---|---|
| First downs | | |
| Plays–yards | | |
| Rushes–yards | | |
| Passing yards | | |
| Passing: comp–att–int | | |
| Turnovers | | |
| Time of possession | | |

| Team | Category | Player | Statistics |
|---|---|---|---|
| Merrimack | Passing | | |
| Merrimack | Rushing | | |
| Merrimack | Receiving | | |
| Maine | Passing | | |
| Maine | Rushing | | |
| Maine | Receiving | | |

=== at Boston College (FBS) ===
Maine Black Bears (1–2) at Boston College Eagles (FBS) (1–1) – Game summary

| Quarter | 1 | 2 | 3 | 4 | Total |
|---|---|---|---|---|---|
| Black Bears | 0 | 10 | 0 | 6 | 16 |
| Eagles (FBS) | 16 | 3 | 3 | 0 | 22 |

at Alumni Stadium • Chestnut Hill, Massachusetts

- Date: September 19
- Game time: 2:00 p.m. EST
- Game weather: Cloudy • Temperature: 66 °F (19 °C)
- Game attendance: 35,605
- Referee: Nate Black
- TV announcers (ACCNX): Cooper Boardman and Craig Haubert

Game information

First quarter
Second quarter
Third quarter
Fourth quarter

| Statistics | ME | BC |
|---|---|---|
| First downs | 18 | 18 |
| Plays–yards | 66–270 | 60–359 |
| Rushes–yards | 34–69 | 39–186 |
| Passing yards | 201 | 173 |
| Passing: comp–att–int | 22–32–2 | 14–21–2 |
| Turnovers | 3 | 2 |
| Time of possession | 30:09 | 29:51 |

| Team | Category | Player | Statistics |
|---|---|---|---|
| Maine | Passing | Eddie Buehler | 22/32, 201 yards, 2 TD, 2 INT |
| Maine | Rushing | Nick Laughlin | 10 carries, 38 yards |
| Maine | Receiving | Evan Wallace | 6 receptions, 46 yards |
| Boston College | Passing | Mason McKenzie | 14/21, 173 yards, TD, 2 INT |
| Boston College | Rushing | Evan Dickens | 15 carries, 102 yards, TD |
| Boston College | Receiving | Johnathan Montague Jr. | 5 receptions, 72 yards, TD |

=== at Elon ===
Maine Black Bears (1–3) at Elon Phoenix (3–1) – Game summary

| Quarter | 1 | 2 | 3 | 4 | Total |
|---|---|---|---|---|---|
| Black Bears | 0 | 0 | 0 | 0 | 0 |
| Phoenix | 0 | 0 | 0 | 0 | 0 |

at Rhodes Stadium • Elon, North Carolina

- Date: September 26
- Game time: 2:00 p.m. EST
- TV announcers (FloSports): TBD

Game information

First quarter
Second quarter
Third quarter
Fourth quarter

| Statistics | ME | ELON |
|---|---|---|
| First downs | | |
| Plays–yards | | |
| Rushes–yards | | |
| Passing yards | | |
| Passing: comp–att–int | | |
| Turnovers | | |
| Time of possession | | |

| Team | Category | Player | Statistics |
|---|---|---|---|
| Maine | Passing | | |
| Maine | Rushing | | |
| Maine | Receiving | | |
| Elon | Passing | | |
| Elon | Rushing | | |
| Elon | Receiving | | |

=== Sacred Heart ===
Sacred Heart Pioneers (1–3) at Maine Black Bears (1–4) – Game summary

| Quarter | 1 | 2 | 3 | 4 | Total |
|---|---|---|---|---|---|
| Pioneers | 0 | 0 | 0 | 0 | 0 |
| Black Bears | 0 | 0 | 0 | 0 | 0 |

at Alfond Sports Stadium • Orono, Maine

- Date: October 3
- Game time: 3:30 p.m. EST
- TV announcers (FloSports): TBD

Game information

First quarter
Second quarter
Third quarter
Fourth quarter

| Statistics | SHU | ME |
|---|---|---|
| First downs | | |
| Plays–yards | | |
| Rushes–yards | | |
| Passing yards | | |
| Passing: comp–att–int | | |
| Turnovers | | |
| Time of possession | | |

| Team | Category | Player | Statistics |
|---|---|---|---|
| Sacred Heart | Passing | | |
| Sacred Heart | Rushing | | |
| Sacred Heart | Receiving | | |
| Maine | Passing | | |
| Maine | Rushing | | |
| Maine | Receiving | | |

=== Bryant ===
Bryant Bulldogs (4–2) at Maine Black Bears (1–5) – Game summary

| Quarter | 1 | 2 | 3 | 4 | Total |
|---|---|---|---|---|---|
| Bulldogs | 0 | 0 | 0 | 0 | 0 |
| Black Bears | 0 | 0 | 0 | 0 | 0 |

at Alfond Sports Stadium • Orono, Maine

- Date: October 17
- Game time: 1:00 p.m. EST
- TV announcers (FloSports): TBD

Game information

First quarter
Second quarter
Third quarter
Fourth quarter

| Statistics | BRY | ME |
|---|---|---|
| First downs | | |
| Plays–yards | | |
| Rushes–yards | | |
| Passing yards | | |
| Passing: comp–att–int | | |
| Turnovers | | |
| Time of possession | | |

| Team | Category | Player | Statistics |
|---|---|---|---|
| Bryant | Passing | | |
| Bryant | Rushing | | |
| Bryant | Receiving | | |
| Maine | Passing | | |
| Maine | Rushing | | |
| Maine | Receiving | | |

=== No. 13 Campbell ===
No. 13 Campbell Fighting Camels (6–1) at Maine Black Bears (1–6) – Game summary

| Quarter | 1 | 2 | 3 | 4 | Total |
|---|---|---|---|---|---|
| No. 13 Fighting Camels | 0 | 0 | 0 | 0 | 0 |
| Black Bears | 0 | 0 | 0 | 0 | 0 |

at Alfond Sports Stadium • Orono, Maine

- Date: October 24
- Game time: 1:00 p.m. EST
- TV announcers (FloSports): TBD

Game information

First quarter
Second quarter
Third quarter
Fourth quarter

| Statistics | CAM | ME |
|---|---|---|
| First downs | | |
| Plays–yards | | |
| Rushes–yards | | |
| Passing yards | | |
| Passing: comp–att–int | | |
| Turnovers | | |
| Time of possession | | |

| Team | Category | Player | Statistics |
|---|---|---|---|
| Campbell | Passing | | |
| Campbell | Rushing | | |
| Campbell | Receiving | | |
| Maine | Passing | | |
| Maine | Rushing | | |
| Maine | Receiving | | |

=== at Rhode Island ===
Maine Black Bears (1–7) at Rhode Island Rams (4–4) – Game summary

| Quarter | 1 | 2 | 3 | 4 | Total |
|---|---|---|---|---|---|
| Black Bears | 0 | 0 | 0 | 0 | 0 |
| Rams | 0 | 0 | 0 | 0 | 0 |

at Centreville Bank Stadium • Pawtucket, Rhode Island

- Date: October 31
- Game time: 12:00 p.m. EST
- TV announcers (FloSports): TBD

Game information

First quarter
Second quarter
Third quarter
Fourth quarter

| Statistics | ME | URI |
|---|---|---|
| First downs | | |
| Plays–yards | | |
| Rushes–yards | | |
| Passing yards | | |
| Passing: comp–att–int | | |
| Turnovers | | |
| Time of possession | | |

| Team | Category | Player | Statistics |
|---|---|---|---|
| Maine | Passing | | |
| Maine | Rushing | | |
| Maine | Receiving | | |
| Rhode Island | Passing | | |
| Rhode Island | Rushing | | |
| Rhode Island | Receiving | | |

=== at Albany ===
Maine Black Bears (1–8) at Albany Great Danes (6–4) – Game summary

| Quarter | 1 | 2 | 3 | 4 | Total |
|---|---|---|---|---|---|
| Black Bears | 0 | 0 | 0 | 0 | 0 |
| Great Danes | 0 | 0 | 0 | 0 | 0 |

at Tom & Mary Casey Stadium • Albany, New York

- Date: November 14
- Game time: 12:00 p.m. EST
- TV announcers (FloSports): TBD

Game information

First quarter
Second quarter
Third quarter
Fourth quarter

| Statistics | ME | ALB |
|---|---|---|
| First downs | | |
| Plays–yards | | |
| Rushes–yards | | |
| Passing yards | | |
| Passing: comp–att–int | | |
| Turnovers | | |
| Time of possession | | |

| Team | Category | Player | Statistics |
|---|---|---|---|
| Maine | Passing | | |
| Maine | Rushing | | |
| Maine | Receiving | | |
| Albany | Passing | | |
| Albany | Rushing | | |
| Albany | Receiving | | |

=== New Hampshire (Battle for the Brice–Cowell Musket) ===
New Hampshire Wildcats (4–7) at Maine Black Bears (1–9) – Game summary

| Quarter | 1 | 2 | 3 | 4 | Total |
|---|---|---|---|---|---|
| Wildcats | 0 | 0 | 0 | 0 | 0 |
| Black Bears | 0 | 0 | 0 | 0 | 0 |

at Alfond Sports Stadium • Orono, Maine

- Date: November 21
- Game time: 1:00 p.m. EST
- TV announcers (FloSports): TBD

Game information

First quarter
Second quarter
Third quarter
Fourth quarter

| Statistics | UNH | ME |
|---|---|---|
| First downs | | |
| Plays–yards | | |
| Rushes–yards | | |
| Passing yards | | |
| Passing: comp–att–int | | |
| Turnovers | | |
| Time of possession | | |

| Team | Category | Player | Statistics |
|---|---|---|---|
| New Hampshire | Passing | | |
| New Hampshire | Rushing | | |
| New Hampshire | Receiving | | |
| Maine | Passing | | |
| Maine | Rushing | | |
| Maine | Receiving | | |

== Roster ==
2026 Maine Black Bears football team roster
Players
Coaches
Offense

| Pos. | # | Name | Class |
|---|---|---|---|
| WR | 1 | Ty'ee Stephens | Jr |
| QB | 2 | Eddie Buehler | So |
| RB | 3 | Daniel Batch | So |
| WR | 4 | Malik McNeely | Jr |
| RB | 5 | Rashawn Marshall | So |
| QB | 10 | Caden Drezek | Jr |
| QB | 11 | Michael McMaugh | Fr |
| WR | 12 | Evan Wallace | Sr |
| WR | 13 | Kevin Jackson | Jr |
| WR | 14 | Juelz Russell | So |
| WR | 15 | Corey Rideout | Fr |
| TE | 16 | Eli Mahan | GS |
| QB | 16 | Matt Pain | Fr |
| WR | 17 | Cordell Jones | Fr |
| QB | 18 | Keegan Andrews | Jr |
| WR | 19 | Keyon Concepcion | So |
| RB | 20 | Nick Laughlin | Jr |
| WR | 23 | Ty Boone | Fr |
| RB | 27 | Aamir Dunbar | Fr |
| RB | 29 | Mako Grant | Fr |
| RB | 36 | Zeb Foster | Fr |
| RB | 38 | Aidan Winter | Fr |
| OL | 57 | Andrew Kocan | Sr |
| OL | 58 | Noah Stanley | So |
| OL | 62 | Pius Ejindu | Jr |
| OL | 64 | Jack Boutaugh | Sr |
| OL | 65 | Ayden Banker | Fr |
| OL | 66 | Ian Erickson | GS |
| OL | 68 | Max Gregor | Sr |
| OL | 70 | Liam Reamer | So |
| OL | 71 | Kenny Walz | So |
| OL | 72 | Tyler Williams | GS |
| OL | 73 | Owen Richardson | Fr |
| OL | 74 | Anthony Iliano | Jr |
| OL | 75 | Anton Kravchuk | Fr |
| OL | 77 | Noah Shimko | Fr |
| OL | 78 | Gavin Richardson | Fr |
| TE | 80 | Elijah Smalls | Jr |
| WR | 81 | Major Leak | Fr |
| WR | 83 | Thomas Simard | Sr |
| TE | 84 | Tyreek Wood | Jr |
| TE | 85 | Connor Hepperlen | Fr |
| TE | 86 | Alexander Perez-Muñoz | Fr |
| TE | 87 | Isaiah Jones | So |
| TE | 88 | Sebastian Ramery | Fr |

Defense

| Pos. | # | Name | Class |
|---|---|---|---|
| DE | 0 | Ta'Kai Chisolm | Jr |
| S | 2 | Jeremiah McGill | GS |
| CB | 6 | Brayden Isaiah | So |
| LB | 7 | Noah Carpenter | So |
| CB | 8 | Jamaree Gibson | Sr |
| DE | 9 | Chris Bacon | Jr |
| LB | 10 | Sam Oppenheimer | Jr |
| DE | 11 | Kye Pressley | Jr |
| CB | 13 | Jonah Richardson | Fr |
| CB | 14 | Alex Nash-Lally | Jr |
| S | 15 | Jake Kucera | So |
| S | 17 | Jeremiah Harris | So |
| S | 18 | Jayden Brown | So |
| CB | 21 | Erv Wiggins, Jr. | Jr |
| LB | 22 | Shane Keyes-Wilson | So |
| CB | 23 | Ronalon Renwick | Fr |
| S | 25 | Isaiah Ervin | Fr |
| S | 26 | Armani Sullivan | Fr |
| DT | 27 | Derek Berlitz | Sr |
| DB | 30 | Ty McLeer | Fr |
| CB | 31 | Kamden Tiller | Fr |
| LB | 32 | Bryceson Wise | Fr |
| LB | 33 | Aamir Thomas | Fr |
| CB | 34 | Carlos Diggs | Fr |
| DB | 35 | Austin West | Fr |
| S | 37 | Kash Grewal | Fr |
| S | 39 | Amari Mack | Jr |
| LB | 40 | Nate Gunderson | So |
| LB | 41 | Kemsley Marsters | So |
| LB | 42 | Jack Bradshaw | Fr |
| DT | 44 | Bryce Purnell | GS |
| LB | 47 | Tony Bongomin | Fr |
| LB | 48 | Elijah Alvarado | So |
| DL | 53 | Jace Negley | So |
| DL | 55 | Nathan Lopez | So |
| DT | 56 | Wazyn King | Fr |
| DT | 93 | Sincere Wilkins | Fr |
| DE | 94 | Brandon Esson | Fr |
| DT | 95 | Michael Hamilton | Sr |
| DE | 96 | Nate Olson | Fr |
| DE | 97 | Cole Baird | So |
| DE | 98 | Dillon White | So |
| DL | 99 | Farradj Titikpina | Jr |

Special teams

| Pos. | # | Name | Class |
|---|---|---|---|
| K/P | 43 | Samuel Tremblay | So |
| K/P | 45 | Omar Aboutoui | Jr |
| LS | 50 | Justin Mucerino | So |
| LS | 54 | Tim Crockett | Fr |
| P | 82 | Anthony Pecorella | GS |

Head coach

- Jordan Stevens (Maine)

Coordinators/assistant coaches

- Mikahael Waters (Nevada)
  Offensive Coordinator/Quarterbacks
- Umberto di Meo (Springfield)
  Defensive Coordinator/Linebackers
- Spencer Carey (Maine)
  Special Teams Coordinator/Safeties
- McCormick Stephenson (Minnesota State)
  Tight Ends/Recruiting Coordinator
- AJ McLaughlin (Husson)
  Defensive Tackles
- James O'Hagan (Buffalo)
  Offensive Line/Run Game Coordinator
- Jeb Boudreaux (Stetson)
  Defense Ends
- Fredrick Gladney (Valparaiso)
  Wide Receivers
- Sean Green
  Running Backs
- Amechie Walker (Iowa State)
  Cornerbacks
- Max Brower (Southeastern Louisiana)
  Head Football Sports Performance Coach
- Spencer Johndro (Maine)
  Football Analytics
- Cooper Heisey (Maine)
  Offensive Analyst
- Izaiah Henderson (Maine)
  Defensive Analyst

Football Support Staff

- Mike DeVito (Maine)
  Director of Player Development & Alumni Relations
- Nicole Earley (Temple)
  Director of Football Operations
- Samantha Wheeler
  Athletic Academic Counselor
- Ryan Taylor
  Head Athletic Trainer
- Jessica Drew
  Assistant Athletic Trainer
- Patrick Reaves
  Equipment Manager
- Muralee Das
  Faculty Liaison

Legend

- (C) Team captain
- (S) Suspended
- (I) Ineligible
- Injured
- Redshirt

Roster
Last update: June 5, 2026
