= 2026 Towson Tigers football team =

American college football season

2026 Towson Tigers football
- Conference: CAA Football
- Record: 4–8 (4–4 CAA)
- Head coach: Pete Shinnick (4th season)
- Offensive coordinator: Adam Neugebauer (2nd season)
- Defensive coordinator: Darian Dulin (4th season)
- Home stadium: Johnny Unitas Stadium

2026 Coastal Athletic Association Football Conference standings
	Conf.			Overall
Team	W		L	W		L
No. 18 Monmouth $^	7	–	0	8	–	3
No. 22 Campbell	5	–	2	8	–	3
Albany	5	–	2	7	–	4
Bryant	5	–	2	7	–	4
North Carolina A&T	4	–	3	5	–	6
Elon	4	–	3	6	–	5
Sacred Heart	4	–	4	4	–	6
Stony Brook	3	–	4	5	–	6
New Hampshire	3	–	4	4	–	7
Towson	3	–	4	3	–	8
Rhode Island	2	–	5	5	–	6
Maine	1	–	6	1	–	9
Hampton	0	–	7	1	–	10
$ – Conference champion; ^ – FCS playoff participant; As of November 22, 2026; Rankings from STATS Poll

The 2026 Towson Tigers football team will represent Towson University as a member of the Coastal Athletic Association Football Conference (CAA) during the 2026 NCAA Division I FCS football season. They will be led by fourth-year head coach Pete Shinnick and will play their home games at Johnny Unitas Stadium located in Towson, Maryland.

== Schedule ==
Date	Time	Opponent	Site	TV	Result	Attendance
August 27	6:00 p.m.	Maine	Johnny Unitas Stadium; Towson, MD	FloFootball	L 18–21	4,642
September 5	3:30 p.m.	at Navy*	Navy–Marine Corps Memorial Stadium; Annapolis, MD	CBSSN	L 15–42	32,654
September 12	7:00 p.m.	at South Carolina*	Williams–Brice Stadium; Columbia, SC	SECN+	L 9–45	78,399
September 19	6:00 p.m.	Morgan State*	Johnny Unitas Stadium; Towson, MD	MEAC Network	L 26–41	10,900
September 26	6:00 p.m.	at Delaware State*	Alumni Stadium; Dover, DE	MEAC Network	L 28–33	2,578
October 3	1:00 p.m.	at Monmouth	Kessler Stadium; West Long Branch, NJ	FloSports	L 40–41	3,894
October 10	4:00 p.m.	Stony Brook	Johnny Unitas Stadium; Towson, MD	FloSports	L 24–31	5,308
October 17	3:30 p.m.	at No. 16 Campbell	Barker-Lane Stadium; Buies Creek, NC	FloSports	L 20–24	5,309
October 31	1:00 p.m.	Hampton^{†}	Johnny Unitas Stadium; Towson, MD	FloSports	W 44–13	4,388
November 7	12:00 p.m.	at Sacred Heart	Sikorsky Credit Union Field; Fairfield, CT	FloSports	W 43–40 ^{2OT}	4,994
November 14	12:00 p.m.	at Rhode Island	Centreville Bank Stadium; Pawtucket, RI	FloSports	W 19–16 ^{OT}	3,378
November 21	1:00 p.m.	Elon	Johnny Unitas Stadium; Towson, MD	FloSports	W 28–24	4,272
*Non-conference game; ^{†}Homecoming; Rankings from STATS Poll released prior to the game; All times are in Eastern time

== Game summaries ==
=== Maine ===
Maine Black Bears (0–0) at Towson Tigers (0–0) – Game summary

Quarter	1	2	3	4	Total
Black Bears	0	21	0	0	21
Tigers	0	8	7	3	18

at Johnny Unitas Stadium • Towson, Maryland

- Date: August 27
- Game time: 6:00 p.m.
- Game weather: Sunny
- Game attendance: 4,642
- TV announcers (FloSports): Spiro Morekas and Gordy Combs

Game information

First quarter

- No scoring plays.

Second quarter

- ME – Malik McNeely 16-yard pass from Eddie Buehler (Samuel Tremblay kick), 8:38. Black Bears 7–0. Drive: 8 plays, 52 yards, 4:42.
- ME – Rashawn Marshall 32-yard run (Samuel Tremblay kick), 2:38. Black Bears 14–0. Drive: 7 plays, 90 yards, 4:09.
- ME – Nick Laughlin 30-yard pass from Eddie Buehler (Samuel Tremblay kick), 0:42. Black Bears 21–0. Drive: 2 plays, 35 yards, 0:23.
- TOW – Aaron Enterline 4-yard pass from Andrew Indorf (Andrew Indorf–Aaron Enterline pass), 0:11. Black Bears 21–8. Drive: 3 plays, 68 yards, 0:24.

Third quarter

- TOW – Cleveland Charlton 59-yard pass from Andrew Indorf (Zaydaan Faridi kick), 5:11. Black Bears 21–15. Drive: 2 plays, 62 yards, 0:42.

Fourth quarter

- TOW – Zaydaan Faridi 39-yard field goal, 12:18. Black Bears 21–18. Drive: 11 plays, 60 yards, 5:08.

Statistics	ME	TOW
First downs	16	16
Plays–yards	60–329	62–379
Rushes–yards	33–130	41–112
Passing yards	199	267
Passing: comp–att–int	17–27–0	15–21–1
Turnovers	0	2
Time of possession	30:33	29:27

Team	Category	Player	Statistics
Maine	Passing	Eddie Buehler	17/27, 199 yards, 2 TD
Maine	Rushing	Rashawn Marshall	13 carries, 81 yards, TD
Maine	Receiving	Evan Wallace	3 receptions, 43 yards
Towson	Passing	Andrew Indorf	15/21, 267 yards, 2 TD, INT
Towson	Rushing	Kemarrion Battles	18 carries, 89 yards
Towson	Receiving	Cleveland Charlton	4 receptions, 136 yards, TD

=== at Navy (FBS) ===
Towson Tigers (0–1) at Navy Midshipmen (FBS) (0–0) – Game summary

Quarter	1	2	3	4	Total
Tigers	0	12	3	0	15
Midshipmen (FBS)	14	14	7	7	42

at Navy–Marine Corps Memorial Stadium • Annapolis, Maryland

- Date: September 5
- Game time: 3:30 p.m.
- Game weather: Cloudy • Temperature: 80 °F (27 °C) • Wind: NE at 6 miles per hour (9.7 km/h)
- Game attendance: 32,654
- Referee: Matt Overton
- TV announcers (CBSSN): Chris Lewis, Randy Cross and Brandon Baylor

Game information

First quarter

- NAVY – Braxton Woodson 38-yard run (Nolan Bartley kick), 10:21. Midshipmen 7–0. Drive: 6 plays, 75 yards, 3:01.
- NAVY – Vic Listorti 35-yard run (Nolan Bartley kick), 3:37. Midshipmen 14–0. Drive: 9 plays, 88 yards, 4:16.

Second quarter

- TOW – Aaron Enterline 48-yard pass from Andrew Indorf (Zaydaan Faridi kick failed), 14:52. Midshipmen 14–6. Drive: 7 plays, 75 yards, 3:45.
- NAVY – Jackson Gutierrez 3-yard run (Nolan Bartley kick), 9:32. Midshipmen 21–6. Drive: 11 plays, 64 yards, 5:12.
- TOW – Jacob Zollar 30-yard pass from Andrew Indorf (pass failed), 7:50. Midshipmen 21–12. Drive: 4 plays, 75 yards, 1:42.
- NAVY – Braxton Woodson 8-yard run (Nolan Bartley kick), 0:24. Midshipmen 28–12. Drive: 8 plays, 50 yards, 1:48.

Third quarter

- NAVY – Jackson Gutierrez 2-yard run (Nolan Bartley kick), 7:46. Midshipmen 35–12. Drive: 13 plays, 75 yards, 7:14.
- TOW – Zaydaan Faridi 40-yard field goal, 3:14. Midshipmen 35–15. Drive: 8 plays, 53 yards, 4:32.

Fourth quarter

- NAVY – Braxton Woodson 4-yard run (Nolan Bartley kick), 8:39. Midshipmen 42–15. Drive: 12 plays, 65 yards, 6:04.

Statistics	TOW	NAVY
First downs	13	30
Plays–yards	39–246	79–527
Rushes–yards	20–39	73–506
Passing yards	207	21
Passing: comp–att–int	14–19–0	3–6–0
Turnovers	0	0
Time of possession	20:10	39:50

Team	Category	Player	Statistics
Towson	Passing	Andrew Indorf	13/18, 208 yards, 2 TD
Towson	Rushing	Kemarrion Battles	8 carries, 25 yards
Towson	Receiving	Aaron Enterline	2 receptions, 69 yards, TD
Navy	Passing	Braxton Woodson	3/6, 21 yards
Navy	Rushing	Braxton Woodson	23 carries, 200 yards, 3 TD
Navy	Receiving	Michael Barrow	2 receptions, 11 yards

=== at South Carolina (FBS) ===
Towson Tigers (0–2) at South Carolina Gamecocks (FBS) (1–0) – Game summary

Quarter	1	2	3	4	Total
Tigers	0	3	6	0	9
Gamecocks (FBS)	7	10	14	14	45

at Williams–Brice Stadium • Columbia, South Carolina

- Date: September 12
- Game time: 7:00 p.m.
- Game weather: Sunny • Temperature: 87 °F (31 °C) • Wind: SW at 5 miles per hour (8.0 km/h)
- Game attendance: 78,399
- Referee: Kyle Olson
- TV announcers (SECN+): Richard Cross and Charlie Strong

Game information

First quarter

- SC – Vicari Swain 58-yard punt return (Max Kelley kick), 9:37. Gamecocks 7–0.

Second quarter

- SC – Max Kelley 33-yard field goal, 12:44. Gamecocks 10–0. Drive: 11 plays, 66 yards, 5:27.
- SC – Matt Fuller 55-yard run (Max Kelley kick), 3:44. Gamecocks 17–0. Drive: 5 plays, 56 yards, 2:50.
- TOW – Zaydaan Faridi 41-yard field goal, 1:04. Gamecocks 17–3. Drive: 8 plays, 52 yards, 2:40.

Third quarter

- SC – LaNorris Sellers 58-yard run (Max Kelley kick), 12:07. Gamecocks 24–3. Drive: 3 plays, 67 yards, 1:06.
- TOW – Aaron Enterline 23-yard pass from Andrew Indorf (Zaydaan Faridi kick BLOCKED), 7:03. Gamecocks 24–9. Drive: 11 plays, 75 yards, 5:04.
- SC – Vicari Swain 45-yard punt return (Malik Orsan kick), 0:03. Gamecocks 31–9.

Fourth quarter

- SC – Jabree Coleman 3-yard run (Malik Orsan kick), 8:29. Gamecocks 38–9. Drive: 3 plays, 27 yards, 1:12.
- SC – Isaiah Augustave 55-yard run (Malik Orsan kick), 6:32. Gamecocks 45–9. Drive: 2 plays, 55 yards, 0:22.

Statistics	TOW	SC
First downs	12	22
Plays–yards	63–203	67–502
Rushes–yards	29–21	41–405
Passing yards	182	97
Passing: comp–att–int	18–34–0	11–26–1
Turnovers	0	2
Time of possession	33:52	26:08

Team	Category	Player	Statistics
Towson	Passing	Andrew Indorf	16/30, 171 yards, TD
Towson	Rushing	Kahseim Phillips	4 carries, 15 yards
Towson	Receiving	Aaron Enterline	10 receptions, 123 yards, TD
South Carolina	Passing	LaNorris Sellers	10/23, 96 yards, INT
South Carolina	Rushing	Matt Fuller	11 carries, 125 yards, TD
South Carolina	Receiving	Nyck Harbor	2 receptions, 35 yards

=== Morgan State (The Battle for Greater Baltimore) ===
Morgan State Bears (2–1) at Towson Tigers (0–3) – Game summary

Quarter	1	2	3	4	Total
Bears	7	17	0	17	41
Tigers	3	3	7	3	16

at Johnny Unitas Stadium • Towson, Maryland

- Date: September 19
- Game time: 6:00 p.m.
- Game weather: Cloudy
- Game attendance: 10,900
- Referee: Jeff Pumphrey
- TV announcers (MEAC Network): Spiro Morekas (play-by-play) and Gordy Combs (analyst)

Game information

First quarter

- (12:45) TOW – Zaydaan Faridi 25-yard field goal (Drive: 4 plays, 0 yards, 1:15; Towson 3–0)
- (9:14) MORG – Marquez Spells 6-yard pass from Cameron Edge, Alex Amaya kick (Drive: 7 plays, 43 yards, 3:23; Morgan State 7–3)

Second quarter

- (14:34) MORG – Jordan Barnett 3-yard run, Alex Amaya kick (Drive: 9 plays, 80 yards, 3:54; Morgan State 14–3)
- (12:00) MORG – Joseph Towler 40-yard pass from Cameron Edge, Alex Amaya kick (Drive: 1 play, 40 yards, 0:10; Morgan State 21–3)
- (2:54) TOW – Zaydaan Faridi 34-yard field goal (Drive: 17 plays, 58 yards, 8:59; Morgan State 21–6)
- (0:02) MORG – Alex Amaya 27-yard field goal (Drive: 12 plays, 65 yards, 2:52; Morgan State 24–6)

Third quarter

- (6:33) TOW – Aaron Enterline 18-yard pass from Andrew Indorf, Zaydaan Faridi kick (Drive: 5 plays, 55 yards, 1:46; Morgan State 24–13)

Fourth quarter

- (13:22) MORG – Justin Perry 37-yard pass from Dante Archie, Alex Amaya kick (Drive: 5 plays, 80 yards, 2:31; Morgan State 31–13)
- (11:48) TOW – Aaron Enterline 41-yard pass from Andrew Indorf, Zaydaan Faridi kick (Drive: 4 plays, 75 yards, 1:34; Morgan State 31–20)
- (11:33) MORG – Keith Jenkins Jr. 95-yard kickoff return, Alex Amaya kick (Morgan State 38–20)
- (6:08) TOW – CJ Schaeffer 2-yard pass from Andrew Indorf (Drive: 11 plays, 75 yards, 5:25; Morgan State 38–26)
- (3:01) MORG – Alex Amaya 20-yard field goal (Drive: 6 plays, 49 yards, 3:07; Morgan State 41–26)

Statistics	MORG	TOW
First downs	19	27
Plays–yards	52–369	76–426
Rushes–yards	28–123	32–61
Passing yards	246	365
Passing: comp–att–int	15–24–0	33–44–1
Turnovers	1	1
Time of possession	23:14	36:46

Team	Category	Player	Statistics
Morgan State	Passing	Cameron Edge	14/23, 209 yards, 2 TD
Morgan State	Rushing	Jordan Barnett	15 carries, 71 yards, TD
Morgan State	Receiving	Joseph Towler	3 receptions, 76 yards, TD
Towson	Passing	Andrew Indorf	33/43, 365 yards, 3 TD, INT
Towson	Rushing	Kemarrion Battles	8 carries, 37 yards
Towson	Receiving	Aaron Enterline	7 receptions, 92 yards, 2 TD

=== at Delaware State ===
Towson Tigers (0–4) at Delaware State Hornets (2–2) – Game summary

Quarter	1	2	3	4	Total
Tigers	0	0	0	0	0
Hornets	0	0	0	0	0

at Alumni Stadium • Dover, Delaware

- Date: September 26
- Game time: 6:00 p.m.
- TV: MEAC Network

Game information

First quarter
Second quarter
Third quarter
Fourth quarter

Statistics	TOW	DSU
First downs		
Plays–yards		
Rushes–yards		
Passing yards		
Passing: comp–att–int		
Turnovers		
Time of possession		

Team	Category	Player	Statistics
Towson	Passing		
Towson	Rushing		
Towson	Receiving		
Delaware State	Passing		
Delaware State	Rushing		
Delaware State	Receiving		

=== at Monmouth ===
Towson Tigers (0–5) at Monmouth Hawks (3–2) – Game summary

Quarter	1	2	3	4	Total
Tigers	0	0	0	0	0
Hawks	0	0	0	0	0

at Kessler Stadium • West Long Branch, New Jersey

- Date: October 3
- Game time: 1:00 p.m.

Game information

First quarter
Second quarter
Third quarter
Fourth quarter

Statistics	TOW	MONM
First downs		
Plays–yards		
Rushes–yards		
Passing yards		
Passing: comp–att–int		
Turnovers		
Time of possession		

Team	Category	Player	Statistics
Towson	Passing		
Towson	Rushing		
Towson	Receiving		
Monmouth	Passing		
Monmouth	Rushing		
Monmouth	Receiving		

=== Stony Brook ===
Stony Brook Seawolves (3–2) at Towson Tigers (0–6) – Game summary

Quarter	1	2	3	4	Total
Seawolves	0	0	0	0	0
Tigers	0	0	0	0	0

at Johnny Unitas Stadium • Towson, MD

- Date: October 10
- Game time: 4:00 p.m.
- TV: FloSports

Game information

First quarter
Second quarter
Third quarter
Fourth quarter

Statistics	STBK	TOW
First downs		
Plays–yards		
Rushes–yards		
Passing yards		
Passing: Comp–Att–Int		
Turnovers		
Time of possession		

Team	Category	Player	Statistics
Stony Brook	Passing		
Stony Brook	Rushing		
Stony Brook	Receiving		
Towson	Passing		
Towson	Rushing		
Towson	Receiving		

=== at No. 16 Campbell ===
Towson Tigers (0–7) at No. 16 Campbell Fighting Camels (5–1) – Game summary

Quarter	1	2	3	4	Total
Tigers	0	0	0	0	0
No. 16 Fighting Camels	0	0	0	0	0

at Barker–Lane Stadium • Buies Creek, North Carolina

- Date: October 17
- Game time: 3:30 p.m.

Game information

First quarter
Second quarter
Third quarter
Fourth quarter

Statistics	TOW	CAM
First downs		
Plays–yards		
Rushes–yards		
Passing yards		
Passing: comp–att–int		
Turnovers		
Time of possession		

Team	Category	Player	Statistics
Towson	Passing		
Towson	Rushing		
Towson	Receiving		
Campbell	Passing		
Campbell	Rushing		
Campbell	Receiving		

=== Hampton ===
Hampton Pirates (1–7) at Towson Tigers (0–8) – Game summary

Quarter	1	2	3	4	Total
Pirates	0	0	0	0	0
Tigers	0	0	0	0	0

at Johnny Unitas Stadium • Towson, Maryland

- Date: October 31
- Game time: 1:00 p.m.

Game information

First quarter
Second quarter
Third quarter
Fourth quarter

Statistics	HAMP	TOW
First downs		
Plays–yards		
Rushes–yards		
Passing yards		
Passing: comp–att–int		
Turnovers		
Time of possession		

Team	Category	Player	Statistics
Hampton	Passing		
Hampton	Rushing		
Hampton	Receiving		
Towson	Passing		
Towson	Rushing		
Towson	Receiving		

=== at Sacred Heart ===
Towson Tigers (1–8) at Sacred Heart Pioneers (4–4) – Game summary

Quarter	1	2	3	4	Total
Tigers	0	0	0	0	0
Pioneers	0	0	0	0	0

at Campus Field • Fairfield, Connecticut

- Date: November 7
- Game time: 12:00 p.m.

Game information

First quarter
Second quarter
Third quarter
Fourth quarter

Statistics	TOW	SHU
First downs		
Plays–yards		
Rushes–yards		
Passing yards		
Passing: comp–att–int		
Turnovers		
Time of possession		

Team	Category	Player	Statistics
Towson	Passing		
Towson	Rushing		
Towson	Receiving		
Sacred Heart	Passing		
Sacred Heart	Rushing		
Sacred Heart	Receiving		

=== at Rhode Island ===
Towson Tigers (2–8) at Rhode Island Rams (5–5) – Game summary

Quarter	1	2	3	4	Total
Tigers	0	0	0	0	0
Rams	0	0	0	0	0

at Centreville Bank Stadium • Pawtucket, Rhode Island

- Date: November 14
- Game time: 12:00 p.m.

Game information

First quarter
Second quarter
Third quarter
Fourth quarter

Statistics	TOW	URI
First downs		
Plays–yards		
Rushes–yards		
Passing yards		
Passing: comp–att–int		
Turnovers		
Time of possession		

Team	Category	Player	Statistics
Towson	Passing		
Towson	Rushing		
Towson	Receiving		
Rhode Island	Passing		
Rhode Island	Rushing		
Rhode Island	Receiving		

=== Elon ===
Elon Phoenix (6–5) at Towson Tigers (3–8) – Game summary

Quarter	1	2	3	4	Total
Phoenix	0	0	0	0	0
Tigers	0	0	0	0	0

at Johnny Unitas Stadium • Towson, Maryland

- Date: November 21
- Game time: 1:00 p.m.

Game information

First quarter
Second quarter
Third quarter
Fourth quarter

Statistics	ELON	TOW
First downs		
Plays–yards		
Rushes–yards		
Passing yards		
Passing: comp–att–int		
Turnovers		
Time of possession		

Team	Category	Player	Statistics
Elon	Passing		
Elon	Rushing		
Elon	Receiving		
Towson	Passing		
Towson	Rushing		
Towson	Receiving		
