= 2026 Sacred Heart Pioneers football team =

American college football season

2026 Sacred Heart Pioneers football
- Conference: CAA Football
- Record: 5–6 (4–4 CAA)
- Head coach: Mark Nofri (15th season)
- Offensive coordinator: Matt Gardner (10th season)
- Defensive coordinator: Darin Edwards (3rd season)
- Home stadium: Sikorsky Credit Union Field

2026 Coastal Athletic Association Football Conference standings
	Conf.			Overall
Team	W		L	W		L
No. 18 Monmouth $^	7	–	0	8	–	3
No. 22 Campbell	5	–	2	8	–	3
Albany	5	–	2	7	–	4
Bryant	5	–	2	7	–	4
North Carolina A&T	4	–	3	5	–	6
Elon	4	–	3	6	–	5
Sacred Heart	4	–	4	4	–	6
Stony Brook	3	–	4	5	–	6
New Hampshire	3	–	4	4	–	7
Towson	3	–	4	3	–	8
Rhode Island	2	–	5	5	–	6
Maine	1	–	6	1	–	9
Hampton	0	–	7	1	–	10
$ – Conference champion; ^ – FCS playoff participant; As of November 22, 2026; Rankings from STATS Poll

The 2026 Sacred Heart Pioneers football team represents Sacred Heart University (SHU) as a member of the Coastal Athletic Association Football Conference (CAA Football) during the 2026 NCAA Division I FCS football season. The Pioneers are led by 15th-year head coach Mark Nofri and play their home games at Sikorsky Credit Union Field in Fairfield, Connecticut.

== Schedule ==
Date	Time	Opponent	Site	TV	Result	Attendance
September 5	2:00 p.m.	at Monmouth	Kessler Stadium; West Long Branch, NJ	FloFootball	L 24–31	3,622
September 12	3:30 p.m.	at UMass*	Warren McGuirk Alumni Stadium; Hadley, MA	ESPN+	L 10–37	14,895
September 19	6:00 p.m.	at Elon	Rhodes Stadium; Elon, NC	FloFootball	L 21–24	6,214
September 26	12:00 p.m.	New Hampshire	Sikorsky Credit Union Field; Fairfield, CT	FloFootball	W 20–13	8,911
October 3	3:30 p.m.	at Maine	Alfond Stadium; Orono, ME	FloFootball	W 24–16	5,466
October 10	12:00 p.m.	Stonehill*	Sikorsky Credit Union Field; Fairfield, CT	FloFootball	L 7–28	3,208
October 17	12:00 p.m.	Hampton	Sikorsky Credit Union Field; Fairfield, CT	FloFootball	W 35–21	3,674
October 31	12:00 p.m.	at Stony Brook	Kenneth P. LaValle Stadium; Stony Brook, NY	FloFootball	W 32–31	1,667
November 7	12:00 p.m.	Towson	Sikorsky Credit Union Field; Fairfield, CT	FloFootball	L 40–43 ^{2OT}	4,994
November 14	12:00 p.m.	Bryant	Sikorsky Credit Union Field; Fairfield, CT	FloFootball	L 23–31	3,133
November 21	12:00 p.m.	at Merrimack*	Duane Stadium; North Andover, MA	ESPN+	W 35–10	1,711
*Non-conference game; All times are in Eastern time

== Game summaries ==
=== at Monmouth ===
Sacred Heart Pioneers (0–0) at Monmouth Hawks (0–1) – Game summary

Quarter	1	2	3	4	Total
Pioneers	7	7	7	3	24
Hawks	7	7	7	10	31

at Kessler Stadium • West Long Branch, New Jersey

- Date: September 5
- Game time: 2:00 p.m.
- Game weather: Sunny • Temperature: 78 °F (26 °C) • Wind: N at 8 miles per hour (13 km/h)
- Game attendance: 3,622
- Referee: Alex Parrella
- TV: FloFootball

Game information

First quarter

- MONM – Kenny Smith Jr. 7-yard run (Sky Sholder kick), 7:58. Hawks 7–0. Drive: 8 plays, 58 yards, 3:12.
- SHU – Jason Palmieri 6-yard pass from Poochie Snyder (Ryan Bocklet kick), 5:07. Tied 7–7. Drive: 7 plays, 74 yards, 2:45.

Second quarter

- SHU – Dean Hangey 9-yard pass from Poochie Snyder (Ryan Bocklet kick), 13:37. Pioneers 14–7. Drive: 9 plays, 65 yards, 5:08.
- MONM – Gavin Nelson 19-yard pass from Frankie Weaver (Sky Sholder kick), 0:22. Tied 14–14. Drive: 11 plays, 85 yards, 3:17.

Third quarter

- MONM – Elijah Jennings 10-yard pass from Frankie Weaver (Sky Sholder kick), 11:31. Hawks 21–14. Drive: 8 plays, 65 yards, 3:29.
- SHU – Dean Hangey 52-yard pass from Poochie Snyder (Ryan Bocklet kick), 3:02. Tied 21–21. Drive: 4 plays, 64 yards, 1:51.

Fourth quarter

- MONM – Sky Sholder 25-yard field goal, 13:46. Hawks 24–21. Drive: 13 plays, 79 yards, 4:08.
- SHU – Ryan Bocklet 23-yard field goal, 8:08. Tied 24–24. Drive: 11 plays, 66 yards, 5:33.
- MONM – Kenny Smith Jr. 7-yard pass from Frankie Weaver (Sky Sholder kick), 2:54. Hawks 31–24. Drive: 11 plays, 68 yards, 5:07.

Statistics	SHU	MONM
First downs	26	23
Plays–yards	71–408	63–350
Rushes–yards	46–217	26–113
Passing yards	191	237
Passing: comp–att–int	14–25–0	26–37–0
Turnovers	0	0
Time of possession	35:26	24:34

Team	Category	Player	Statistics
Sacred Heart	Passing	Poochie Snyder	14/25, 191 yards, 3 TD
Sacred Heart	Rushing	Chuck Webb	18 carries, 72 yards
Sacred Heart	Receiving	Dean Hangey	5 receptions, 110 yards, 2 TD
Monmouth	Passing	Frankie Weaver	26/37, 237 yards, 3 TD
Monmouth	Rushing	Elijah Jennings	11 carries, 52 yards
Monmouth	Receiving	Gavin Nelson	8 receptions, 89 yards, TD

=== at UMass (FBS) ===
Sacred Heart Pioneers (0–1) at UMass Minutemen (FBS) (1–0) – Game summary

Quarter	1	2	3	4	Total
Pioneers	0	0	3	7	10
Minutemen (FBS)	17	6	14	0	37

at Warren McGuirk Alumni Stadium • Hadley, Massachusetts

- Date: September 12
- Game time: 3:30 p.m.
- Game weather: Cloudy • Temperature: 76 °F (24 °C) • Wind: S 8 MPH
- Game attendance: 14,895
- Referee: Andrew Speciale
- TV announcers (ESPN+): Joey Lindstrom and Tre Watson

Game information

First quarter

- MASS – T. Y. Harding 49-yard pass from William Watson III (Derek Morris kick), 14:16. Minutemen 7–0. Drive: 2 plays, 75 yards, 0:40.
- MASS – T. Y. Harding 82-yard punt return (Derek Morris kick), 11:44. Minutemen 14–0.
- MASS – Derek Morris 33-yard field goal, 1:40. Minutemen 17–0. Drive: 15 plays, 83 yards, 8:18.

Second quarter

- MASS – William Watson III 8-yard run (kick failed), 0:21. Minutemen 23–0. Drive: 4 plays, 71 yards, 1:28.

Third quarter

- MASS – Reece Adkins 1-yard run (Derek Morris kick), 11:51. Minutemen 30–0. Drive: 4 plays, 8 yards, 1:47.
- MASS – Jahmad Harmon 34-yard interception return (Derek Morris kick), 10:23. Minutemen 37–0.
- SHU – Ryan Bocklet 35-yard field goal, 5:29. Minutemen 37–3. Drive: 10 plays, 58 yards, 4:54.

Fourth quarter

- SHU – Cole Snider 1-yard run (Ryan Bocklet kick), 3:32. Minutemen 37–10. Drive: 15 plays, 75 yards, 8:10.

Statistics	SHU	MASS
First downs	16	11
Plays–yards	67–303	40–315
Rushes–yards	42–143	26–152
Passing yards	160	163
Passing: Comp–Att–Int	17–25–1	11–14–0
Turnovers	1	0
Time of possession	35:01	24:59

Team	Category	Player	Statistics
Sacred Heart	Passing	Poochie Snyder	11/16, 77 yards, INT
Sacred Heart	Rushing	Nicholas Yanchuk	6 carries, 28 yards
Sacred Heart	Receiving	Jason Palmieri	5 receptions, 46 yards
UMass	Passing	William Watson III	9/10, 152 yards, TD
UMass	Rushing	Elijah Faulkner	11 carries, 72 yards
UMass	Receiving	Joseph Griffin Jr.	3 receptions, 59 yards

=== at Elon ===
Sacred Heart Pioneers (0–2) at Elon Phoenix (2–1) – Game summary

Quarter	1	2	3	4	Total
Pioneers	0	0	0	0	0
Phoenix	0	0	0	0	0

at Rhodes Stadium • Elon, North Carolina

- Date: September 19
- Game time: 6:00 p.m.
- TV announcers (FloSports): TBD

Game information

First quarter
Second quarter
Third quarter
Fourth quarter

Statistics	SHU	ELON
First downs		
Plays–yards		
Rushes–yards		
Passing yards		
Passing: comp–att–int		
Turnovers		
Time of possession		

Team	Category	Player	Statistics
Sacred Heart	Passing		
Sacred Heart	Rushing		
Sacred Heart	Receiving		
Elon	Passing		
Elon	Rushing		
Elon	Receiving		

=== New Hampshire ===
New Hampshire Wildcats (1–3) at Sacred Heart Pioneers (0–3) – Game summary

Quarter	1	2	3	4	Total
Wildcats	0	0	0	0	0
Pioneers	0	0	0	0	0

at Campus Field • Fairfield, Connecticut

- Date: September 26
- Game time: 12:00 p.m.

Game information

First quarter
Second quarter
Third quarter
Fourth quarter

Statistics	UNH	SHU
First downs		
Plays–yards		
Rushes–yards		
Passing yards		
Passing: comp–att–int		
Turnovers		
Time of possession		

Team	Category	Player	Statistics
New Hampshire	Passing		
New Hampshire	Rushing		
New Hampshire	Receiving		
Sacred Heart	Passing		
Sacred Heart	Rushing		
Sacred Heart	Receiving		

=== at Maine ===
Sacred Heart Pioneers (1–3) at Maine Black Bears (1–4) – Game summary

Quarter	1	2	3	4	Total
Pioneers	0	0	0	0	0
Black Bears	0	0	0	0	0

at Alfond Sports Stadium • Orono, Maine

- Date: October 3
- Game time: 3:30 p.m.
- TV announcers (FloSports): TBD

Game information

First quarter
Second quarter
Third quarter
Fourth quarter

Statistics	SHU	ME
First downs		
Plays–yards		
Rushes–yards		
Passing yards		
Passing: comp–att–int		
Turnovers		
Time of possession		

Team	Category	Player	Statistics
Sacred Heart	Passing		
Sacred Heart	Rushing		
Sacred Heart	Receiving		
Maine	Passing		
Maine	Rushing		
Maine	Receiving		

=== Stonehill ===
Stonehill Skyhawks (1–4) at Sacred Heart Pioneers (2–3) – Game summary

Quarter	1	2	3	4	Total
Skyhawks	0	0	0	0	0
Pioneers	0	0	0	0	0

at Campus Field • Fairfield, Connecticut

- Date: October 10
- Game time: 12:00 p.m.
- TV: FloSports

Game information

First quarter
Second quarter
Third quarter
Fourth quarter

Statistics	STO	SHU
First downs		
Plays–yards		
Rushes–yards		
Passing yards		
Passing: comp–att–int		
Turnovers		
Time of possession		

Team	Category	Player	Statistics
Stonehill	Passing		
Stonehill	Rushing		
Stonehill	Receiving		
Sacred Heart	Passing		
Sacred Heart	Rushing		
Sacred Heart	Receiving		

=== Hampton ===
Hampton Pirates (1–5) at Sacred Heart Pioneers (2–4) – Game summary

Quarter	1	2	3	4	Total
Pirates	0	0	0	0	0
Pioneers	0	0	0	0	0

at Campus Field • Fairfield, Connecticut

- Date: October 17
- Game time: 12:00 p.m.
- TV: FloSports

Game information

First quarter
Second quarter
Third quarter
Fourth quarter

Statistics	HAMP	SHU
First downs		
Plays–yards		
Rushes–yards		
Passing yards		
Passing: comp–att–int		
Turnovers		
Time of possession		

Team	Category	Player	Statistics
Hampton	Passing		
Hampton	Rushing		
Hampton	Receiving		
Sacred Heart	Passing		
Sacred Heart	Rushing		
Sacred Heart	Receiving		

=== at Stony Brook ===
Sacred Heart Pioneers (3–4) at Stony Brook Seawolves (5–3) – Game summary

Quarter	1	2	3	4	Total
Pioneers	0	0	0	0	0
Seawolves	0	0	0	0	0

at Kenneth P. LaValle Stadium • Stony Brook, NY

- Date: October 31
- Game time: 12:00 p.m. EST
- TV: FloSports

Game information

First quarter
Second quarter
Third quarter
Fourth quarter

Statistics	SHU	STBK
First downs		
Plays–yards		
Rushes–yards		
Passing yards		
Passing: Comp–Att–Int		
Turnovers		
Time of possession		

Team	Category	Player	Statistics
Sacred Heart	Passing		
Sacred Heart	Rushing		
Sacred Heart	Receiving		
Stony Brook	Passing		
Stony Brook	Rushing		
Stony Brook	Receiving		

=== Towson ===
Towson Tigers (1–8) at Sacred Heart Pioneers (4–4) – Game summary

Quarter	1	2	3	4	Total
Tigers	0	0	0	0	0
Pioneers	0	0	0	0	0

at Campus Field • Fairfield, Connecticut

- Date: November 7
- Game time: 12:00 p.m.

Game information

First quarter
Second quarter
Third quarter
Fourth quarter

Statistics	TOW	SHU
First downs		
Plays–yards		
Rushes–yards		
Passing yards		
Passing: comp–att–int		
Turnovers		
Time of possession		

Team	Category	Player	Statistics
Towson	Passing		
Towson	Rushing		
Towson	Receiving		
Sacred Heart	Passing		
Sacred Heart	Rushing		
Sacred Heart	Receiving		

=== Bryant ===
Bryant Bulldogs (6–4) at Sacred Heart Pioneers (4–5) – Game summary

Quarter	1	2	3	4	Total
Bulldogs	0	0	0	0	0
Pioneers	0	0	0	0	0

at Campus Field • Fairfield, Connecticut

- Date: November 14
- Game time: 12:00 p.m.

Game information

First quarter
Second quarter
Third quarter
Fourth quarter

Statistics	BRY	SHU
First downs		
Plays–yards		
Rushes–yards		
Passing yards		
Passing: comp–att–int		
Turnovers		
Time of possession		

Team	Category	Player	Statistics
Bryant	Passing		
Bryant	Rushing		
Bryant	Receiving		
Sacred Heart	Passing		
Sacred Heart	Rushing		
Sacred Heart	Receiving		

=== at Merrimack ===
Sacred Heart Pioneers (4–6) at Merrimack Warriors (5–6) – Game summary

Quarter	1	2	3	4	Total
Pioneers	0	0	0	0	0
Warriors	0	0	0	0	0

at Duane Stadium • North Andover, Massachusetts

- Date: November 21

Game information

First quarter
Second quarter
Third quarter
Fourth quarter

Statistics	SHU	MRMK
First downs		
Plays–yards		
Rushes–yards		
Passing yards		
Passing: comp–att–int		
Turnovers		
Time of possession		

Team	Category	Player	Statistics
Sacred Heart	Passing		
Sacred Heart	Rushing		
Sacred Heart	Receiving		
Merrimack	Passing		
Merrimack	Rushing		
Merrimack	Receiving		
