= 2025 Maine Black Bears football team =

American college football season

2025 Maine Black Bears football
- Conference: CAA Football Conference
- Record: 6–6 (5–3 CAA)
- Head coach: Jordan Stevens (4th season)
- Offensive coordinator: Mikahael Waters (2nd season)
- Defensive coordinator: Umberto Di Meo (2nd season)
- Captains: Carter Peevy (offense); Latrell Couchman (defense)
- Home stadium: Alfond Stadium

2025 Coastal Athletic Association Football Conference standings
	Conf.			Overall
Team	W		L	W		L
No. 11 Rhode Island $^	8	–	0	11	–	3
No. 4т Villanova ^	7	–	1	12	–	3
No. 23 New Hampshire ^	6	–	2	8	–	5
No. 22 Monmouth	6	–	2	9	–	3
William & Mary	6	–	2	7	–	5
Maine	5	–	3	6	–	6
Elon	4	–	4	6	–	6
Stony Brook	4	–	4	6	–	6
Towson	4	–	4	6	–	6
North Carolina A&T	2	–	6	2	–	10
Campbell	2	–	6	2	–	10
Bryant	1	–	7	3	–	9
Albany	1	–	7	2	–	10
Hampton	0	–	8	2	–	10
$ – Conference champion; ^ – FCS playoff participant; Rankings from STATS Poll

The 2025 Maine Black Bears football team represented the University of Maine as a member of the Coastal Athletic Association Football Conference (CAA) in the 2025 NCAA Division I FCS football season. The Black Bears were led by fourth-year head coach Jordan Stevens and played their home games at Alfond Stadium in Orono, Maine.

== Transfers ==
=== Outgoing ===
Over the off-season, Maine lost nineteen players through the transfer portal. Eighteen committed to new schools.

Name	Pos.	New school
Tavion Banks	RB	IUP
Dorian Blackwell	CB	UTRGV
Ayden Chabak	DL	Drake
Zion Cheeks	LB	Unknown
Zaheem Crawford-Patterson	WR	Gannon
Shymell Davis	DT	UMass
Grayson DiPietro	LB	Shepherd
Dede Doegan	CB	Cumberland
Harry Fuller	OL	Franklin Pierce
Anthony Harris	QB	Gannon
Xavier Holmes	DE	James Madison
Alhaji Kamara	CB	Stony Brook
Tristen Kenan	RB	Gannon
Kylan Lamke	IOL	Shippensburg
Jabari Odoemenem	LB	Duquesne
Daren Omoregie	CB	Wagner
Shakur Smalls	S	Arkansas
Tyshawn Stewart	LB	Gannon
Nic Swanson	S	Gannon

=== Incoming ===
Over the off-season, Maine added twenty-one players through the transfer portal.

Name	Pos.	Class	Previous school
Sincere Baines	RB	Jr	UNC Pembroke
Cole Baird	DE	So	Air Force
Jayden Brown	LB	R-Fr	Syracuse
Ngianni Cerisier	CB	Sr	Arizona Christian
Jordon Crawford	DL	Jr	Hawaii
Ian Erickson	OL	Sr	Villanova
Malcolm Folk	S	R-Jr	Kent State
Jake Hall	LB	R-Sr	UTEP
Brayden Holmes	CB	So	Furman
Sivert Klefsaas	RB	Sr	Northwestern - St. Paul
Vincent Nwachi	CB	R-Sr	Frostburg State
Sam Oppenheimer	LB	So	Army
Anthony Pecorella	P	Gr	Stony Brook
Bryce Purnell	DT	Sr	Virginia
Elias Sherman	DT	R-So	Central Missouri
Thomas Simard	WR	Jr	Walsh
Farradj Titikpina	DT	R-So	Coastal Carolina
Kenny Walz	OL	R-Fr	East Carolina
Jaleal Williams-Evans	S	Sr	UTEP
Corey Wilson	DB	Sr	Hampton
Scott Woods II	WR/KR	R-Sr	Harvard

== Schedule ==
Date	Time	Opponent	Site	TV	Result	Attendance
August 30	4:00 p.m.	at Liberty*	Williams Stadium; Lynchburg, VA	ESPN+	L 7–28	20,337
September 6	6:00 p.m.	at William & Mary	Zable Stadium; Williamsburg, VA	FloSports	L 27–28	8,229
September 13	6:00 p.m.	Stonehill*	Alfond Stadium; Orono, ME	FloSports	L 10–13	3,966
September 20	7:00 p.m.	at Georgia Southern*	Paulson Stadium; Statesboro, GA	ESPN+	L 17–45	23,217
September 27	3:30 p.m.	North Carolina A&T	Alfond Stadium; Orono, ME	FloSports	W 37–30	5,033
October 4	2:00 p.m.	at Bryant	Beirne Stadium; Smithfield, RI	FloSports	W 34–14	2,867
October 11	1:00 p.m.	at Merrimack*	Duane Stadium; North Andover, MA	ESPN+	W 20–13	1,749
October 25	1:00 p.m.	Elon^{†}	Alfond Stadium; Orono, ME	FloSports	W 35–14	5,243
November 1	1:00 p.m.	Stony Brook	Alfond Stadium; Orono, ME	FloSports	W 28–21	3,325
November 8	1:00 p.m.	at Hampton	Armstrong Stadium; Hampton, VA	FloSports	W 35–7	2,179
November 15	1:00 p.m.	No. 11 Rhode Island	Alfond Stadium; Orono, ME	FloSports	L 13–45	4,012
November 22	1:00 p.m.	at No. 25 New Hampshire	Wildcat Stadium; Durham, NH (rivalry)	FloSports	L 27–33	6,876
*Non-conference game; ^{†}Homecoming; Rankings from STATS Poll released prior to the game; All times are in Eastern time

== Game summaries ==
=== at Liberty (FBS) ===
Game One – Maine Black Bears (0–0) at Liberty Flames (FBS) (0–0) – Game summary

Quarter	1	2	3	4	Total
Black Bears	0	7	0	0	7
Flames (FBS)	0	7	0	21	28

at Williams Stadium • Lynchburg, Virginia

- Date: Saturday August 30, 2025
- Game time: 4:00 PM EST
- Game attendance: 20,337
- Referee: David Burge
- TV announcers (ESPN+): Matt Warner (play-by-play), Joe Jauch (analyst) and Annie Cory (sideline)

Game information

First quarter

- No scoring plays.

Second quarter

- ME – Sincere Baines 77-yard run (Samuel Trembley kick), 13:58. Black Bears 7–0. Drive: 1 play, 77 yards, 0:13.
- LIB – Reese Smith 9-yard pass from Ethan Vasko (Jay Billingsley kick), 0:07. Tied 7–7. Drive: 3 plays, 38 yards, 0:17.

Third quarter

- No scoring plays.

Fourth quarter

- LIB – Evan Dickens 24-yard pass from Ethan Vasko (Jay Billingsley kick), 10:24. Flames 14–7. Drive: 6 plays, 62 yards, 1:39.
- LIB – Donte Lee Jr. 16-yard pass from Ethan Vasko (Jay Billingsley kick), 4:33. Flames 21–7. Drive: 10 plays, 48 yards, 5:03.
- LIB – Ethan Vasko 13-yard run (Jay Billingsley kick), 2:38. Flames 28–7. Drive: 4 plays, 32 yards, 1:02.

Statistics	ME	LIB
First downs	15	22
Plays–yards	63–316	73–391
Rushes–yards	32–184	40–194
Passing yards	132	197
Passing: Comp–Att–Int	13–31–1	19–33–0
Turnovers	2	0
Time of possession	26:26	33:34

Team	Category	Player	Statistics
Maine	Passing	Carter Peevy	13/31, 132 yards, INT
Maine	Rushing	Sincere Baines	11 carries, 118 yards, TD
Maine	Receiving	Molayo Irefin	3 receptions, 35 yards
Liberty	Passing	Ethan Vasko	19/33, 197 yards, 3 TD
Liberty	Rushing	Ethan Vasko	13 carries, 63 yards, TD
Liberty	Receiving	Reese Smith	6 receptions, 46 yards, TD

=== at Wiliam & Mary ===
Maine Black Bears (0-1) at William & Mary Tribe (0-1) – Game summary

Quarter	1	2	3	4	Total
Black Bears	7	10	7	3	27
Tribe	0	7	14	7	28

at Zable Stadium • Williamsburg, VA

- Date: September 6
- Game time: 6:00 PM EDT
- Game weather: Rain • Temperature: 80 °F (27 °C)
- Game attendance: 8,231
- Referee: Justin Ackley
- TV: FloSports

Game information

First quarter

- (2:15) ME – Sincere Baines 1-yard pass from Carter Peevy, Samuel Tremblay kick (Drive: 15 plays, 66 yards, 6:53; Maine 7–0)

Second quarter

- (9:30) ME – Carter Peevy 45-yard run, Samuel Tremblay kick (Drive: 4 plays, 54 yards, 2:05; Maine 14–0)
- (7:02) W&M – Deven Thompson 23-yard pass from Tyler Hughes, Keegan Shackford kick (Drive: 5 plays, 70 yards, 2:28; Maine 14–7)
- (1:46) ME – Samuel Tremblay 27-yard field goal (Drive: 13 plays, 55 yards, 5:16; Maine 17–7)

Third quarter

- (11:44) W&M – Sean McElwain 6-yard pass from Tyler Hughes, Keegan Shackford kick (Drive: 3 plays, 17 yards, 0:58; Maine 17–14)
- (8:04) W&M – Josh Miller 2-yard run, Keegan Shackford kick (Drive: 8 plays, 55 yards, 2:43; William & Mary 21–17)
- (1:18) ME – Scott Woods 2-yard pass from Carter Peevy, Samuel Tremblay kick (Drive: 13 plays, 75 yards, 6:46; Maine 24–21)

Fourth quarter

- (7:09) ME – Samuel Tremblay 22-yard field goal (Drive: 11 plays, 56 yards, 5:07; Maine 27–21)
- (3:11) W&M – Rashad Raymond 1-yard run, Keegan Shackford kick (Drive: 7 plays, 65 yards, 3:58; William & Mary 28–27)

Statistics	ME	W&M
First downs	21	19
Total yards	323	253
Rushing yards	226	124
Passing yards	97	129
Passing: Comp–Att–Int	13–27–1	13–20–0
Time of possession	31:51	27:08

Team	Category	Player	Statistics
Maine	Passing	Carter Peevy	13/27, 97 yards, 2 TD, INT
Maine	Rushing	Carter Peevy	12 carries, 98 yards, TD
Maine	Receiving	Scott Woods II	6 receptions, 48 yards, TD
William & Mary	Passing	Tyler Hughes	13/19, 129 yards, 2 TD
William & Mary	Rushing	Tyler Hughes	10 carries, 73 yards
William & Mary	Receiving	Garrett Robertson	3 receptions, 35 yards

=== Stonehill ===
Stonehill Skyhawks (0-2) vs. Maine Black Bears (0-2) – Game summary

Quarter	1	2	3	4	Total
Skyhawks	3	3	0	7	13
Black Bears	0	7	3	0	10

at Alfond Sports Stadium • Orono, ME

- Date: September 13
- Game time: 6:00 PM EDT
- Game attendance: 3966
- Referee: Alex Parrella
- TV announcers (FloSports): Jim Churchill (play-by-play), Jack Webb (analyst) and Allison Ouellette (sideline)

Statistics	STO	ME
First downs	15	11
Total yards	196	266
Rushing yards	64	171
Passing yards	132	95
Passing: Comp–Att–Int	14-26-0	15-26-0
Time of possession	32:44	27:16

Team	Category	Player	Statistics
Stonehill	Passing	Jack O'Connell	14/26, 132 yards, TD
Stonehill	Rushing	Zavion Woodard	8 carries, 30 yards
Stonehill	Receiving	Brigham Dunphy	2 receptions, 43 yards, TD
Maine	Passing	Carter Peevy	15/26, 95 yards
Maine	Rushing	Sincere Baines	12 carries, 106 yards
Maine	Receiving	Molayo Irefin	3 receptions, 39 yards

=== at Georgia Southern (FBS) ===
Maine Black Bears (0-3) at Georgia Southern Eagles (FBS) (1-2) – Game summary

Quarter	1	2	3	4	Total
Black Bears	7	7	3	0	17
Eagles (FBS)	7	10	14	14	45

at Paulson Stadium • Statesboro, GA

- Date: September 20
- Game time: 7:00 PM EDT
- Game weather: Sunny • Temperature: 83 °F (28 °C)
- Game attendance: 23,217
- Referee: Scott Broadway
- TV announcers (ESPN+): Danny Waugh (play-by-play), Jayson Foster (analyst) and Skye Taylor (sideline)

Game information

First quarter

- (11:28) ME – Carter Peevy 27-yard run, Samuel Tremblay kick (Drive: 5 plays, 70 yards, 2:28; Maine 7–0)
- (2:11) GASO – OJ Arnold 3-yard run, Tripp Bryant kick (Drive: 14 plays, 68 yards, 6:34; Tied 7–7)

Second quarter

- (11:24) GASO – Tripp Bryant 22-yard field goal (Drive: 11 plays, 69 yards, 3:22; Georgia Southern 10–7)
- (5:56) GASO – Dalen Cobb 3-yard run, Tripp Bryant kick (Drive: 7 plays, 76 yards, 3:13; Georgia Southern 17–7)
- (1:07) ME – Devin Vaught 76-yard interception return, Samuel Tremblay kick (Drive: 5 plays, 34 yards, 0:54; Georgia Southern 17–14)

Third quarter

- (10:43) GASO – Weston Bryan 1-yard run, Tripp Bryant kick (Drive: 4 plays, 61 yards, 1:43; Georgia Southern 24–14)
- (5:59) ME – Samuel Tremblay 33-yard field goal (Drive: 11 plays, 59 yards, 4:44; Georgia Southern 24–17)
- (3:26) GASO – Dalen Cobb 25-yard pass from JC French IV, Tripp Bryant kick (Drive: 5 plays, 74 yards, 2:26; Georgia Southern 31–17)

Fourth quarter

- (14:01) GASO – Camden Brown 12-yard pass from OJ Arnold, Tripp Bryant kick (Drive: 1 play, 12 yards, 0:05; Georgia Southern 38–17)
- (8:50) GASO – Jamarian Samuel 1-yard run, Tripp Bryant kick (Drive: 9 plays, 42 yards, 3:43; Georgia Southern 45–17)

Statistics	ME	GASO
First downs	17	28
Plays–yards	64–248	77–516
Rushes–yards	30–109	40–206
Passing yards	139	310
Passing: Comp–Att–Int	19-34-1	22-37-1
Turnovers	2	2
Time of possession	31:30	28:30

Team	Category	Player	Statistics
Maine	Passing	Carter Peevy	13-22, 88 yards
Maine	Rushing	Sincere Baines	7 carries, 41 yards
Maine	Receiving	Rashawn Marshall	4 receptions, 25 yards
Georgia Southern	Passing	JC French IV	19-31, 253 yards, TD, INT
Georgia Southern	Rushing	OJ Arnold	13 carries, 85 yards, TD
Georgia Southern	Receiving	Camden Brown	6 receptions, 118 yards, TD

=== North Carolina A&T ===
North Carolina A&T Aggies (1-3) vs. Maine Black Bears (0-4) – Game summary

Quarter	1	2	3	4	Total
Aggies	0	16	0	14	30
Black Bears	7	23	7	0	37

at Alfond Sports Stadium • Orono, ME

- Date: September 27
- Game time: 3:30 PM EDT
- Game attendance: 5033
- Referee: Cory Hanson
- TV announcers (FloSports): Jim Churchill (play-by-play), Jack Webb (analyst) and Allison Ouellette (sideline)

Statistics	NCAT	ME
First downs	20	20
Total yards	348	483
Rushing yards	69	181
Passing yards	279	302
Passing: Comp–Att–Int	19-33-0	20-27-0
Time of possession	28:10	31:50

Team	Category	Player	Statistics
North Carolina A&T	Passing	Kevin White	19-32, 279 yards, 2 TD
North Carolina A&T	Rushing	Wesley Graves	13 carries, 47 yards, TD
North Carolina A&T	Receiving	Jayvonne Dillard	6 receptions, 70 yards, TD
Maine	Passing	Carter Peevy	20-27, 302 yards, 2 TD
Maine	Rushing	Sincere Baines	15 carries, 99 yards, TD
Maine	Receiving	Nick Laughlin	3 receptions, 105 yards, TD

=== at Bryant ===
Maine Black Bears (1-4) vs. Bryant Bulldogs (2-3) – Game summary

Quarter	1	2	3	4	Total
Black Bears	17	17	0	0	34
Bulldogs	0	0	0	14	14

at Beirne Stadium • Smithfield, RI

- Date: October 4
- Game time: 2:00 PM EDT
- Game weather: Sunny
- Game attendance: 2,867
- Referee: Todd Boyd
- TV announcers (FloSports): Thomaas Zinzarella (play-by-play) and Tim Lynch (analyst)

Game information

First Quarter

- (11:34) ME – Scott Woods 66-yard pass from Carter Peevy, Samuel Tremblay kick (Drive: 4 plays, 79 yards, 1:38; Maine 7–0)
- (8:54) ME – Samuel Tremblay 29-yard field goal (Drive: 7 plays, 15 yards, 2:26; Maine 10–0)
- (6:58) ME – Trevin Ewing 15-yard run, Samuel Tremblay kick (Drive: 2 plays, 20 yards, 0:50; Maine 17–0)

Second Quarter

- (9:18) ME – Nick Laughlin 64-yard pass from Carter Peevy, Samuel Tremblay kick (Drive: 3 plays, 83 yards, 1:11; Maine 24–0)
- (3:55) ME – Samuel Tremblay 33-yard field goal (Drive: 7 plays, 12 yards, 2:54; Maine 24–0)
- (0:25) ME – Scott Woods 14-yard pass from Carter Peevy, Samuel Tremblay kick (Drive: 10 plays, 80 yards, 2:00; Maine 34–0)

Third Quarter

No scoring plays

Fourth Quarter

- (14:47) BRY – Jaden Keefner 12-yard run, Nicholas Stoyanovich kick (Drive: 4 plays, 60 yards, 1:30; Maine 34–7)
- (1:40) BRY – Jaden Keefner 6-yard run, Nicholas Stoyanovich kick (Drive: 4 plays, 75 yards, 1:03; Maine 34–14)

Statistics	ME	BRY
First downs	20	17
Total yards	421	253
Rushing yards	83	144
Passing yards	338	109
Passing: Comp–Att–Int	23–36–0	10–25–1
Time of possession	34:04	25:56

Team	Category	Player	Statistics
Maine	Passing	Carter Peevy	23/36, 338 yards, 3 TD
Maine	Rushing	Sincere Baines	13 carries, 52 yards
Maine	Receiving	Scott Woods II	5 receptions, 103 yards, 2 TD
Bryant	Passing	Jaden Keefner	5/9, 76 yards
Bryant	Rushing	Jaden Keefner	12 carries, 83 yards, 2 TD
Bryant	Receiving	Zyheem Collick	2 receptions, 52 yards

=== at Merrimack ===
Maine Black Bears (2-4) vs. Merrimack Warriors (3-3) – Game summary

Quarter	1	2	3	4	Total
Black Bears	7	6	0	7	20
Warriors	7	3	3	0	13

at Duane Stadium • North Andover, MA

- Date: October 11
- Game time: 1:00 p.m. EDT
- Game attendance: 1,749
- TV: ESPN+

Statistics	ME	MRMK
First downs	20	15
Total yards	400	329
Rushing yards	241	200
Passing yards	159	129
Passing: Comp–Att–Int	12–25–1	15–26–2
Time of possession	30:56	29:04

Team	Category	Player	Statistics
Maine	Passing	Carter Peevy	12/25, 159 yards, INT
Maine	Rushing	Rashawn Marshall	19 carries, 146 yards
Maine	Receiving	Scott Woods II	4 receptions, 75 yards
Merrimack	Passing	Ayden Pereira	14/19, 129 yards, TD
Merrimack	Rushing	Ayden Pereira	15 carries, 131 yards
Merrimack	Receiving	Seth Sweitzer	4 receptions, 51 yards, TD

=== Elon ===
Elon Phoenix (4-4) vs. Maine Black Bears (3-4) – Game summary

Quarter	1	2	3	4	Total
Phoenix	7	0	0	7	14
Black Bears	0	14	7	14	35

at Alfond Sports Stadium • Orono, ME

- Date: October 25
- Game time: 1:00 PM EDT
- Game attendance: 5243
- Referee: Todd Bowman
- TV announcers (FloSports): Jim Churchill (play-by-play), Jack Webb (analyst) and Allison Ouellette (sideline)

Statistics	ELON	ME
First downs	15	24
Total yards	231	409
Rushing yards	103	149
Passing yards	128	260
Passing: Comp–Att–Int	16-23-1	24-34-0
Time of possession	27:09	32:51

Team	Category	Player	Statistics
Elon	Passing	Landen Clark	16-23, 128 yards, TD, INT
Elon	Rushing	Jimmyll Williams	7 carries, 48 yards, TD
Elon	Receiving	Isaiah Fuhrmann	3 receptions, 31 yards, TD
Maine	Passing	Carter Peevy	24-24, 260 yards, 2 TD
Maine	Rushing	Rashawn Marshall	15 carries, 141 yards, TD
Maine	Receiving	Scott Woods II	6 receptions, 69 yards

=== Stony Brook ===
Stony Brook Seawolves (4-4) vs. Maine Black Bears (4-4) – Game summary

Quarter	1	2	3	4	Total
Seawolves	0	7	7	7	21
Black Bears	14	0	14	0	28

at Alfond Sports Stadium • Orono, ME

- Date: November 1
- Game time: 1:00 PM EDT
- Game attendance: 3325
- Referee: Jeremy DeAngulo
- TV announcers (FloSports): Jim Churchill (play-by-play), Jack Webb (analyst) and Allison Ouellette (sideline)

Statistics	STBK	ME
First downs	21	20
Total yards	302	392
Rushing yards	3	204
Passing yards	299	188
Passing: Comp–Att–Int	33-60-0	14-25-2
Time of possession	23:39	36:21

Team	Category	Player	Statistics
Stony Brook	Passing	Quinn Boyd	33-59, 299 yards, TD, 5 sacks
Stony Brook	Rushing	Roland Dempster	14 carries, 22 yards, 2 TD
Stony Brook	Receiving	Dez Williams	9 receptions, 129 yards, TD
Maine	Passing	Carter Peevy	14-25, 188 yards, 2 TD, 2 INT
Maine	Rushing	Sincere Baines	12 carries, 86 yards, TD
Maine	Receiving	Aaron Arteaga	1 reception, 44 yards

=== at Hampton ===
Maine Black Bears (5-4) vs. Hampton Pirates (2-7) – Game summary

Quarter	1	2	3	4	Total
Black Bears	14	7	7	7	35
Pirates	0	7	0	0	7

at Armstrong Stadium • Hampton, VA

- Date: November 8
- Game time: 1:00 PM EST
- Game attendance: 2179
- Referee: Marc Queen
- TV: FloSports

Statistics	ME	HAMP
First downs	22	9
Total yards	311	189
Rushing yards	183	92
Passing yards	128	97
Passing: Comp–Att–Int	18-26-0	11-14-0
Time of possession	35:30	24:30

Team	Category	Player	Statistics
Maine	Passing	Carter Peevy	17-24, 121 yards, 4 TD
Maine	Rushing	Rashawn Marshall	11 carries, 64 yards, TD
Maine	Receiving	Molayo Irefin	4 receptions, 48 yards
Hampton	Passing	Earl Woods III	9-10, 81 yards, TD
Hampton	Rushing	Donovan Shepard	3 carries, 61 yards
Hampton	Receiving	Tae'Shaun Johnson	5 receptions, 58 yards

=== No. 11 Rhode Island ===
No. 11 Rhode Island Rams (8–2) at Maine Black Bears (6–4) – Game summary

Quarter	1	2	3	4	Total
No. 11 Rams	14	14	14	3	45
Black Bears	0	7	6	0	13

at Alfond Sports Stadium • Orono, ME

- Date: November 15
- Game time: 1:00 PM EST
- Game attendance: 4,012
- Referee: Alex Parrella
- TV announcers (FloSports): Jim Churchill (play-by-play), Jack Webb (analyst) and Allison Ouellette (sideline)

Game information

First quarter

- URI – Antwain Littleton Jr. 2-yard run (Garth White kick), 3:29. Rams 7–0. Drive: 13 plays, 74 yards, 6:33.
- URI – Dontay Bishop 2-yard pass from Devin Farrell (Garth White kick), 0:41. Rams 14–0. Drive: 3 plays, 5 yards, 1:21.

Second quarter

- ME – Scott Woods 40-yard pass from Carter Peevy (Samuel Tremblay kick), 12:50. Rams 14–7. Drive: 6 plays, 88 yards, 2:43.
- URI – Brendon Barrow 12-yard run (Garth White kick), 11:54. Rams 21–7. Drive: 2 plays, 77 yards, 0:50.
- URI – Marquis Buchanan 63-yard pass from Devin Farrell (Garth White kick), 7:34. Rams 28–7. Drive: 6 plays, 87 yards, 3:17.

Third quarter

- URI – Brendon Barrow 3-yard run (Garth White kick), 7:40. Rams 35–7. Drive: 5 plays, 59 yards, 2:16.
- ME – Carter Peevy 4-yard run (pass failed), 2:10. Rams 35–13. Drive: 7 plays, 51 yards, 3:45.
- URI – Antwain Littleton Jr. 52-yard run (Garth White kick), 1:50. Rams 42–13. Drive: 1 play, 52 yards, 0:10.

Fourth quarter

- URI – Garth White 27-yard field goal, 11:17. Rams 45–13. Drive: 10 plays, 61 yards, 3:53.

Statistics	URI	ME
First downs	21	15
Plays–yards	62–497	62–323
Rushes–yards	39–264	28–45
Passing yards	233	278
Passing: Comp–Att–Int	17-23-0	21-34-0
Turnovers	1	0
Time of possession	29:27	30:33

Team	Category	Player	Statistics
Rhode Island	Passing	Devin Farrell	16/22, 221 yards, 2 TD
Rhode Island	Rushing	Antwain Littleton, Jr.	21 carries, 202 yards, 2 TD
Rhode Island	Receiving	Marquis Buchanan	6 receptions, 138 yards, TD
Maine	Passing	Carter Peevy	21/34, 278 yards, TD
Maine	Rushing	Sincere Baines	11 carries, 36 yards
Maine	Receiving	Scott Woods II	5 receptions, 114 yards, TD

=== at No. 25 New Hampshire (Battle for the Brice–Cowell Musket) ===
Maine Black Bears (6–5) at No. 25 New Hampshire Wildcats (7–4) – Game summary

Quarter	1	2	3	4	Total
Black Bears	0	7	7	13	27
Wildcats	3	24	0	6	33

at Wildcat Stadium • Durham, NH

- Date: November 22
- Game time: 1:00 PM EST
- Game weather: Cloudy • Temperature: 50 °F (10 °C)
- Game attendance: 6,876
- Referee: Bill McKeever
- TV: FloSports

Game information

First quarter

- UNH – Nick Reed 29-yard field goal, 11:44. Wildcats 3–0. Drive: 6 plays, 64 yards, 3:16.

Second quarter

- UNH – Myles Thomason 1-yard run (Nick Reed kick), 13:20. Wildcats 10–0. Drive: 5 plays, 45 yards, 3:05.
- UNH – Nick Reed 21-yard field goal, 9:49. Wildcats 13–0. Drive: 4 plays, 7 yards, 1:41.
- ME – Carter Peevy 2-yard run (Samuel Tremblay kick), 7:40. Wildcats 13–7. Drive: 5 plays, 75 yards, 2:09.
- UNH – Chase Wilson 8-yard pass from Matt Vezza (Matt Vezza–Josh Fillion pass), 4:19. Wildcats 21–7. Drive: 7 plays, 66 yards, 3:14.
- UNH – Nick Reed 55-yard field goal, 1:47. Wildcats 24–7. Drive: 5 plays, 8 yards, 0:57.
- UNH – Nick Reed 33-yard field goal, 0:00. Wildcats 27–7. Drive: 7 plays, 29 yards, 1:35.

Third quarter

- ME – Trevin Ewing 12-yard pass from Carter Peevy (Samuel Tremblay kick), 12:32. Wildcats 27–14. Drive: 5 plays, 59 yards, 2:22.

Fourth quarter

- ME – Rashawn Marshall 9-yard run (Samuel Tremblay kick), 9:39. Wildcats 27–21. Drive: 8 plays, 80 yards, 5:09.
- UNH – Matt Vezza 10-yard run (pass failed), 1:56. Wildcats 33–21. Drive: 12 plays, 73 yards, 7:42.
- ME – Carter Peevy 62-yard run (Samuel Tremblay kick BLOCKED), 0:39. Wildcats 33–27. Drive: 8 plays, 91 yards, 1:10.

Statistics	ME	UNH
First downs	18	20
Plays–yards	52–369	68–396
Rushes–yards	25–189	40–130
Passing yards	180	266
Passing: Comp–Att–Int	15-27-2	16-28-0
Turnovers	2	0
Time of possession	23:07	36:53

Team	Category	Player	Statistics
Maine	Passing	Carter Peevy	15/27, 180 yards, TD, 2 INT
Maine	Rushing	Carter Peevy	8 carries, 114 yards, 2 TD
Maine	Receiving	Ty'ee Stephens	1 reception, 68 yards
New Hampshire	Passing	Matt Vezza	16/27, 266 yards, TD
New Hampshire	Rushing	Myles Thomason	22 carries, 73 yards, TD
New Hampshire	Receiving	Caleb Burke	1 reception, 63 yards

== Roster ==
2025 Maine Black Bears football team roster
Players
Coaches
Offense

Pos.	#	Name	Class
WR	0	Ty'ee Stephens	So
WR	2	Trevin Ewing	Sr
RB	3	Sincere Baines	Jr
WR	4	Molayo Irefin	GS
WR	5	Scott Woods II	Sr
QB	10	Caden Drezek	So
QB	11	Carter Peevy	GS
WR	12	Evan Wallace	Jr
WR	13	Aaron Arteaga	Jr
WR	14	Juelz Russell	Fr
TE	16	Eli Mahan	Sr
QB	16	Michael McMaugh	Fr
QB	17	Eddie Buehler	Fr
QB	18	Keegan Andrews	So
WR	19	Daniel Batch	Fr
WR	20	Nick Laughlin	So
RB	23	Sivert Klefsaas	Sr
RB	24	Rashawn Marshall	Fr
RB	29	Mako Grant	Fr
RB	36	Zeb Foster	Fr
RB	36	Symon Sathler	Jr
TE	42	Luke Grigson	Fr
TE	48	Declan McKevitt	Sr
OL	57	Andrew Kocan	Jr
OL	58	Noah Stanley	Fr
OL	62	Pius Ejindu	So
OL	64	Jack Boutaugh	Jr
OL	65	Nicolas Cruji	Jr
OL	66	Ian Erickson	Sr
OL	67	Dan O'Leary	Fr
OL	68	Max Gregor	Jr
OL	70	Liam Reamer	Fr
OL	71	Kenny Walz	Fr
OL	72	Tyler Williams	Jr
OL	74	Anthony Iliano	So
OL	75	Anton Kravchuk	Fr
OL	77	Noah Shimko	Fr
OL	78	Jack Lillie	So
TE	80	Elijah Smalls	So
WR	83	Thomas Simard	Jr
WR	84	Kevin Jackson	So
WR	85	Blake Thomas	So
TE	86	Jake Kucera	So
TE	87	Francisco Pratts	Jr
TE	88	Sebastian Ramery	Fr
WR	89	Gianni Rossitto	Jr

Defense

Pos.	#	Name	Class
S	1	Devin Vaught	So
CB	6	Vincent Nwachi	Sr
LB	7	Latrell Couchman	Jr
CB	8	Jamaree Gibson	Jr
DE	10	Nicolas Kalume	Jr
LB	11	Christian Thomas	GS
LB	12	Noah Carpenter	Fr
S	15	Jake Kucera	Fr
CB	17	Na'Cire Christmas	So
CB	21	Brayden Isaiah	Fr
DB	22	Ngianni Cerisier	Sr
CB	23	Brayden Holmes	So
S	25	Isaiah Ervin	Fr
S	26	Armani Sullivan	Fr
S	27	Malcolm Folk	Jr
DB	28	Corey Wilson	Sr
CB	29	Nassir Young	Sr
LB	30	Lawson Foley	Fr
CB	31	Kamden Tiller	Fr
LB	32	Bryceson Wise	Fr
LB	33	Sam Oppenheimer	So
LB	34	Shane Keyes-Wilson	Fr
S	35	Ja'Darius Steele	Fr
S	37	Kash Grewal	Fr
LB	38	Sherrod Hudson	Jr
S	39	Amari Mack	So
LB	44	Jake Hall	Sr
DE	45	Ta'Kai Chisolm	So
DL	55	Nathan Lopez	Fr
DT	56	Wazyn King	Fr
DT	73	Jace Negley	Fr
DT	90	Jaedin Lee	So
DL	91	Jordon Crawford	Jr
DT	92	Elias Sherman	So
DE	93	Kye Pressley	So
DE	94	Chris Bacon	So
DT	95	Mike Hamilton	Jr
DT	96	Bryce Purnell	Sr
DE	97	Cole Baird	So
DE	98	Dillon White	Fr
DL	99	Farradj Titikpina	So

Special teams

Pos.	#	Name	Class
K	40	Joey Bryson	Jr
K	41	Kemsley Marsters	Fr
K/P	43	Samuel Tremblay	Fr
LS	50	Zach Zoglio	GS
LS	51	Landon Beal	Fr
P	82	Anthony Pecorella	GS

Head coach

- Jordan Stevens (Maine)

Coordinators/assistant coaches

- Mikahael Waters (Nevada)
  Offensive coordinator/Quarterbacks
- Umberto di Meo (Springfield)
  Defensive coordinator/Linebackers
- Spencer Carey (Maine)
  Special Teams Coordinator/Cornerbacks
- Pushaun Brown (Maine)
  Running backs/Assistant Special Teams Coordinator/Pro Liaison
- McCormick Stephenson (Minnesota State)
  Tight Ends
- AJ McLaughlin (Husson)
  Defensive Line
- Jalen Hairston (Charleston)
  Safeties/Defensive Pass Game Coordinator
- Jeb Boudreaux (Stetson)
  Outside Linebackers
- James O'Hagan (Buffalo)
  Offensive Line/Run Game Coordinator
- Braelon Roberts (Utah State)
  Wide Receivers
- Jared Shibley (Springfield)
  Head Football Sports Performance Coach
- Mike DeVito (Maine)
  Director of Player Development & Alumni Relations
- Nicole Earley (Temple)
  Director of Football Operations
- Thatcher Allen (Springfield)
  Offensive Quality Control/Video Coordinator
- Nathan Kue (Albany)
  Recruiting Assistant
- Julie Cheville
  Athletics Academic Counselor
- Muralee Das
  Faculty Liaison

Legend

- (C) Team captain
- (S) Suspended
- (I) Ineligible
- Injured
- Redshirt

Roster
Last update: September 9, 2024
