= List of Big South Conference football standings =

This is a list of yearly Big South Conference football standings.

== Big South standings ==
2002 Big South Conference football standings
	Conf.			Overall
Team	W		L	W		L
No. 22 Gardner–Webb $	3	–	0	9	–	1
Elon	2	–	1	4	–	7
Liberty	1	–	2	2	–	9
Charleston Southern	0	–	3	4	–	8
$ – Conference champion; Rankings from The Sports Network poll

2003 Big South Conference football standings
	Conf.			Overall
Team	W		L	W		L
Gardner–Webb $	4	–	0	8	–	4
Liberty	3	–	1	6	–	6
VMI	2	–	2	6	–	6
Coastal Carolina	1	–	3	6	–	5
Charleston Southern	0	–	4	1	–	11
$ – Conference champion

2004 Big South Conference football standings
	Conf.			Overall
Team	W		L	W		L
No. 24 Coastal Carolina $	4	–	0	10	–	1
Liberty	3	–	1	6	–	5
Gardner–Webb	2	–	2	5	–	6
Charleston Southern	1	–	3	5	–	5
VMI	0	–	4	0	–	11
$ – Conference champion; Rankings from The Sports Network poll

2005 Big South Conference football standings
	Conf.			Overall
Team	W		L	W		L
No. 24 Coastal Carolina +	3	–	1	9	–	2
Charleston Southern +	3	–	1	7	–	4
Gardner–Webb	2	–	2	5	–	6
VMI	2	–	2	3	–	8
Liberty	0	–	4	1	–	10
+ – Conference co-champions; Rankings from The Sports Network poll

2006 Big South Conference football standings
	Conf.			Overall
Team	W		L	W		L
No. 14 Coastal Carolina $^	4	–	0	9	–	3
Charleston Southern	2	–	2	9	–	2
Gardner–Webb	2	–	2	6	–	5
Liberty	2	–	2	6	–	5
VMI	0	–	4	1	–	10
$ – Conference champion; ^ – FCS playoff participant; Rankings from The Sports Network poll

2007 Big South Conference football standings
	Conf.			Overall
Team	W		L	W		L
Liberty $	4	–	0	8	–	3
Coastal Carolina	3	–	1	5	–	6
Gardner–Webb	2	–	2	5	–	6
Charleston Southern	1	–	3	5	–	6
VMI	0	–	4	2	–	9
$ – Conference champion

2008 Big South Conference football standings
	Conf.			Overall
Team	W		L	W		L
No. 14 Liberty $	5	–	0	10	–	2
Stony Brook	3	–	2	5	–	6
Charleston Southern	3	–	2	7	–	5
Gardner–Webb	2	–	3	5	–	6
Coastal Carolina	1	–	4	6	–	6
VMI	1	–	4	4	–	7
Presbyterian	1	–	4	4	–	8
$ – Conference champion; Rankings from The Sports Network poll

2009 Big South Conference football standings
	Conf.			Overall
Team	W		L	W		L
No. 22 Liberty +	5	–	1	8	–	3
Stony Brook +	5	–	1	6	–	5
Charleston Southern	4	–	2	6	–	5
Gardner–Webb	3	–	3	6	–	5
Coastal Carolina	3	–	3	5	–	6
VMI	1	–	5	2	–	9
Presbyterian	0	–	6	0	–	11
+ – Conference co-champions; Rankings from The Sports Network poll

2010 Big South Conference football standings
	Conf.			Overall
Team	W		L	W		L
No. 21 Liberty +	5	–	1	8	–	3
Stony Brook +	5	–	1	6	–	5
Coastal Carolina +^	5	–	1	6	–	6
Gardner–Webb	2	–	4	4	–	7
VMI	2	–	4	3	–	8
Charleston Southern	1	–	5	3	–	8
Presbyterian	1	–	5	2	–	9
$ – Conference champion; ^ – FCS playoff participant; Rankings from The Sports Network poll

2011 Big South Conference football standings
	Conf.			Overall
Team	W		L	W		L
No. 18 Stony Brook $^	6	–	0	9	–	4
No. 25 Liberty	5	–	1	7	–	4
Coastal Carolina	3	–	3	7	–	4
Presbyterian	3	–	3	4	–	7
Gardner–Webb	2	–	4	4	–	7
VMI	2	–	4	2	–	9
Charleston Southern	0	–	6	0	–	11
$ – Conference champion; ^ – FCS playoff participant; Rankings from The Sports Network poll

2012 Big South Conference football standings
	Conf.			Overall
Team	W		L	W		L
No. 10 Stony Brook +^	5	–	1	10	–	3
Coastal Carolina +^	5	–	1	8	–	5
Liberty +	5	–	1	6	–	5
Charleston Southern	3	–	3	5	–	6
Gardner–Webb	2	–	4	3	–	8
VMI	1	–	5	2	–	9
Presbyterian	0	–	6	2	–	9
$ – Conference champion; ^ – FCS playoff participant; Rankings from The Sports Network poll

2013 Big South Conference football standings
	Conf.			Overall
Team	W		L	W		L
No. 7 Coastal Carolina +^	4	–	1	12	–	3
Liberty +	4	–	1	8	–	4
No. 24 Charleston Southern	3	–	2	10	–	3
Gardner–Webb	2	–	3	7	–	5
Presbyterian	1	–	4	3	–	8
VMI	1	–	4	2	–	10
+ – Conference co-champions; ^ – FCS playoff participant; Rankings from The Sports Network poll

2014 Big South Conference football standings
	Conf.			Overall
Team	W		L	W		L
No. 5 Coastal Carolina +^	4	–	1	12	–	2
No. 17 Liberty +^	4	–	1	9	–	5
Charleston Southern	3	–	2	8	–	4
Presbyterian	3	–	2	6	–	5
Monmouth	1	–	4	6	–	5
Gardner–Webb	0	–	5	4	–	8
+ – Conference co-champions; ^ – FCS playoff participant; Rankings from The Sports Network poll

2015 Big South Conference football standings
	Conf.			Overall
Team	W		L	W		L
No. 6 Charleston Southern $^	6	–	0	10	–	3
No. 16 Coastal Carolina ^	4	–	2	9	–	3
Liberty	3	–	3	6	–	5
Monmouth	3	–	3	5	–	6
Kennesaw State	2	–	4	6	–	5
Gardner–Webb *	2	–	4	4	–	7
Presbyterian	1	–	5	2	–	9
$ – Conference champion; ^ – FCS playoff participant; * Gardner–Webb ineligible for postseason due to APR violations; Rankings from STATS Poll

2016 Big South Conference football standings
	Conf.			Overall
Team	W		L	W		L
No. 15 Charleston Southern +^	4	–	1	7	–	4
Liberty +	4	–	1	6	–	5
Kennesaw State	3	–	2	8	–	3
Gardner–Webb	3	–	2	5	–	6
Presbyterian	1	–	4	2	–	9
Monmouth	0	–	5	4	–	7
+ – Conference co-champions; ^ – FCS playoff participant; Rankings from STATS Poll

2017 Big South Conference football standings
	Conf.			Overall
Team	W		L	W		L
No. 8 Kennesaw State $^	5	–	0	12	–	2
Monmouth ^	4	–	1	9	–	3
Charleston Southern	3	–	2	6	–	5
Liberty *	2	–	3	6	–	5
Presbyterian	1	–	4	4	–	7
Gardner–Webb	0	–	5	1	–	10
$ – Conference champion; ^ – FCS playoff participant; * Liberty ineligible for postseason due to FBS transition; Rankings from STATS Poll

2018 Big South Conference football standings
	Conf.			Overall
Team	W		L	W		L
No. 5 Kennesaw State $^	5	–	0	11	–	2
Monmouth	4	–	1	8	–	3
Charleston Southern	3	–	2	5	–	6
Gardner–Webb	2	–	3	3	–	8
Campbell	1	–	4	6	–	5
Presbyterian	0	–	5	2	–	8
$ – Conference champion; ^ – FCS playoff participant; Rankings from STATS Poll

2019 Big South Conference football standings
	Conf.			Overall
Team	W		L	W		L
No. 12 Monmouth $^	6	–	0	11	–	3
No. 13 Kennesaw State ^	5	–	1	11	–	3
Charleston Southern	4	–	2	6	–	6
Campbell	3	–	3	6	–	5
Hampton	1	–	5	5	–	7
Gardner–Webb	1	–	5	3	–	9
Presbyterian	1	–	5	2	–	10
North Alabama *	0	–	0	4	–	7
$ – Conference champion; ^ – FCS playoff participant; * North Alabama ineligible for FCS postseason play due to transition to NCAA Division I; Rankings from STATS Poll

2020 Big South Conference football standings
	Conf.			Overall
Team	W		L	W		L
No. 10 Monmouth $^	3	–	0	3	–	1
No. 17 Kennesaw State	2	–	1	4	–	1
Charleston Southern	2	–	2	2	–	2
Gardner–Webb	0	–	2	2	–	2
Robert Morris	0	–	2	0	–	3
$ – Conference champion; ^ – FCS playoff participant; Notes: Due to COVID-19, the Big South suspended the fall 2020 football season. Hampton opted out of the spring schedule. Campbell and North Alabama played only in the fall.; Rankings from STATS Poll

2021 Big South Conference football standings
	Conf.			Overall
Team	W		L	W		L
No. 11 Kennesaw State $^	7	–	0	11	–	2
Monmouth	6	–	1	7	–	4
North Carolina A&T	3	–	4	5	–	6
North Alabama	3	–	4	3	–	8
Charleston Southern	3	–	4	4	–	6
Hampton	3	–	4	5	–	6
Robert Morris	3	–	5	4	–	6
Campbell	2	–	5	3	–	8
Gardner–Webb	2	–	5	4	–	7
$ – Conference champion; ^ – FCS playoff participant; Rankings from STATS Poll

2022 Big South Conference football standings
	Conf.			Overall
Team	W		L	W		L
Gardner–Webb $^	5	–	0	7	–	6
North Carolina A&T	4	–	1	7	–	4
Campbell	2	–	3	5	–	6
Bryant	2	–	3	4	–	7
Charleston Southern	2	–	3	2	–	8
Robert Morris	0	–	5	0	–	11
$ – Conference champion; ^ – FCS playoff participant; Rankings from STATS Poll

2023 Big South–OVC football standings
	Conf.			Overall
Team	W		L	W		L
Gardner–Webb +^	5	–	1	7	–	5
No. 25 UT Martin +	5	–	1	8	–	3
Eastern Illinois	4	–	2	8	–	3
Bryant	4	–	2	6	–	5
Southeast Missouri State	3	–	3	4	–	7
Tennessee Tech	2	–	4	4	–	7
Robert Morris	2	–	4	4	–	7
Charleston Southern	2	–	4	4	–	7
Tennessee State	2	–	4	6	–	5
Lindenwood *	1	–	5	3	–	7
+ – Conference co-champions; ^ – FCS playoff participant; Note: Lindenwood ineligible for Big South–OVC title and FCS postseason play due to transition from NCAA Division II.; Rankings from STATS Poll

2024 Big South–OVC football standings
	Conf.			Overall
Team	W		L	W		L
No. 16 Southeast Missouri State +^	6	–	2	9	–	4
Tennessee Tech +	6	–	2	7	–	5
No. 17 UT Martin +^	6	–	2	9	–	5
No. 19 Tennessee State +^	6	–	2	9	–	4
Lindenwood*	4	–	4	5	–	7
Western Illinois	3	–	5	4	–	8
Gardner–Webb	3	–	5	4	–	8
Eastern Illinois	2	–	6	3	–	9
Charleston Southern	0	–	8	1	–	11
+ – Conference co-champions; ^ – FCS playoff participant; Note: Lindenwood ineligible for Big South–OVC title and FCS postseason play due to transition from NCAA Division II.; Rankings from STATS Poll

2025 OVC–Big South football standings
	Conf.			Overall
Team	W		L	W		L
No. 16 Tennessee Tech $^	8	–	0	11	–	2
UT Martin	6	–	2	6	–	6
Gardner–Webb	5	–	3	7	–	5
Lindenwood	5	–	3	6	–	6
Charleston Southern	4	–	4	5	–	7
Southeast Missouri State	3	–	5	4	–	8
Western Illinois	3	–	5	4	–	8
Eastern Illinois	2	–	6	3	–	8
Tennessee State	0	–	8	2	–	10
$ – Conference champion; ^ – FCS playoff participant; Rankings from STATS Poll

2026 Ohio Valley Conference football standings
	Conf.			Overall
Team	W		L	W		L
Charleston Southern	0	–	0	0	–	0
Eastern Illinois	0	–	0	0	–	0
Gardner–Webb	0	–	0	0	–	0
Lindenwood	0	–	0	0	–	0
Southeast Missouri State	0	–	0	0	–	0
Tennessee State	0	–	0	0	–	0
No. 23 UT Martin	0	–	0	0	–	0
Western Illinois	0	–	0	0	–	0
Rankings from STATS Poll
