= 2024 Tennessee State Tigers football team =

American college football season

2024 Tennessee State Tigers football

Big South–OVC co-champion

NCAA Division I First Round, L 27–41 at Montana
- Conference: Big South–OVC Football Association

Ranking
- STATS: No. 19
- FCS Coaches: No. 19
- Record: 9–4 (6–2 Big South–OVC)
- Head coach: Eddie George (4th season)
- Offensive coordinator: Travis Partridge (1st season)
- Offensive scheme: Pro-style
- Defensive coordinator: Brandon Fisher (4th season)
- Base defense: Multiple 3–3–5
- Home stadium: Nissan Stadium

2024 Big South–OVC football standings
	Conf.			Overall
Team	W		L	W		L
No. 16 Southeast Missouri State +^	6	–	2	9	–	4
Tennessee Tech +	6	–	2	7	–	5
No. 17 UT Martin +^	6	–	2	9	–	5
No. 19 Tennessee State +^	6	–	2	9	–	4
Lindenwood*	4	–	4	5	–	7
Western Illinois	3	–	5	4	–	8
Gardner–Webb	3	–	5	4	–	8
Eastern Illinois	2	–	6	3	–	9
Charleston Southern	0	–	8	1	–	11
+ – Conference co-champions; ^ – FCS playoff participant; Note: Lindenwood ineligible for Big South–OVC title and FCS postseason play due to transition from NCAA Division II.; Rankings from STATS Poll

The 2024 Tennessee State Tigers football team represented Tennessee State University as a member of the Big South–OVC Football Association during the 2024 NCAA Division I FCS football season. The Tigers were led by fourth-year head coach Eddie George, and played their home games at Nissan Stadium in Nashville, Tennessee.

== Preseason ==
=== Preseason poll ===
The Big South-OVC Conference released their preseason poll on July 17, 2024. The Tigers were picked to finish fourth in the conference.

=== Transfers ===
==== Outgoing ====
Player	Position	New school
Thomas Nance	DL	Bethune–Cookman
Terrell Allen	DL	Tulane
Romello Watson	OL	Georgia State
Monroe Beard III	LB	Marshall
Jahee Blake	WR	Norfolk State
Rayqwon Smith	DL	North Alabama
Bryce Phillips	DB	San Diego State
Nicholas Green	OL	San Diego State
Demeatric Crenshaw	QB	Slippery Rock
Canen Adrian	WR	Stephen F. Austin
Jashon Watkins	DB	UMass
Jalen Rouse	RB	Unknown
Jeremiah Josephs	S	Unknown

==== Incoming ====
Player	Position	Previous school
Saidou Ba	OL	Arkansas State
CJ Evans Jr.	RB	Austin Peay
Gerard Bullock	TE	Austin Peay
Aiden Smith	WR	Bryant
Kierron Smith	DL	Georgia Southern
JayT Jackson	DB	Georgia State
Will Jones	OL	Grambling State
Anthony Smith	OL	Iowa State
Yirayah LaNier	DL	Louisville
George Hamsley	QB	LSU
Tevin Carter	QB	Memphis
Mark Shenouda	P	Memphis
Meonta Kimbrough	DL	Memphis
Tyler Jones	DB	Missouri
Marvin Atuatasi	OL	Morgan State
Blake Gamez	OL	Northern Arizona
Keandre Booker	LB	Southeast Missouri State
Camani Cobbs	DB	Southeast Missouri State
Exavious Reed	TE	Southern Miss
Kaderris Roberts	RB	Stetson
Connor Meadows	OL	Tennessee
Malik Ganaway	DB	Tennessee
Camron Douglas	DL	Tennessee
Jalal Dean	WR	Tennessee Tech
Kheagian Heckaman	TE	UTEP
Jackson Foster	K	Western Michigan

== Schedule ==
Date	Time	Opponent	Rank	Site	TV	Result	Attendance
August 31	5:00 p.m.	Mississippi Valley State*		Nissan Stadium; Nashville, TN	ESPN+	W 41–21	8,124
September 7	2:30 p.m.	at No. 2 North Dakota State*		Fargodome; Fargo, ND	ESPN+	L 3–52	16,811
September 14	6:00 p.m.	vs. Arkansas–Pine Bluff*		Simmons Bank Liberty Stadium; Memphis, TN (Southern Heritage Classic)	HBCU GO	W 41–28	27,584
September 21	1:30 p.m.	at Tennessee Tech		Tucker Stadium; Cookeville, TN (Sgt. York Trophy)	ESPN+	L 14–24	8,019
September 28	5:00 p.m.	Charleston Southern		Nissan Stadium; Nashville, TN	ESPN+	W 13–9	1,853
October 5	1:00 p.m.	at Lindenwood		Harlen C. Hunter Stadium; St. Charles, MO	ESPN+	W 24–20	3,103
October 12	5:00 p.m.	Eastern Illinois^{†}		Nissan Stadium; Nashville, TN	ESPN+	W 41–17	7,875
October 19	2:30 p.m.	at Howard*		William H. Greene Stadium; Washington, D.C.	ESPN+	W 27–14	9,995
November 2	5:00 p.m.	UT Martin	No. 25	Nissan Stadium; Nashville, TN (Sgt. York Trophy)	ESPN+	L 21–28	2,845
November 9	1:00 p.m.	at Western Illinois		Hanson Field; Macomb, IL	ESPN+	W 45–20	1,459
November 16	3:00 p.m.	at Gardner–Webb		Ernest W. Spangler Stadium; Boiling Springs, NC	ESPN+	W 23–20	3,763
November 23	3:30 p.m.	No. 12 Southeast Missouri State		Nissan Stadium; Nashville, TN	ESPN+	W 28–21	1,536
November 30	9:15 p.m.	No. 13 Montana	No. 21	Washington–Grizzly Stadium; Missoula, MT (NCAA Division I First Round)	ESPN2	L 27–41	12,479
*Non-conference game; ^{†}Homecoming; Rankings from STATS Poll released prior to the game; All times are in Central time

== Game summaries ==
=== vs Mississippi Valley State ===
Mississippi Valley State Delta Devils (0–0) vs Tennessee State Tigers (0–0) – Game summary

Quarter	1	2	3	4	Total
Delta Devils	0	0	0	21	21
Tigers	21	10	0	10	41

at Nissan Stadium • Nashville, TN

- Date: August 31, 2024
- Game time: 5:00 p.m.
- Game weather: Sunny, 87 °F (31 °C)
- Game attendance: 8,124
- Referee: Jeremee Tate
- TV announcers (ESPN+): Dan Laing, Chris Sanders

Game information

First quarter
Second quarter
Third quarter
Fourth quarter

Statistics	MVSU	TNST
First downs	16	21
Total yards	264	495
Rushing yards	69	138
Passing yards	195	357
Passing: Comp–Att–Int	13–23–1	22–34–1
Time of possession	30:10	29:50

Team	Category	Player	Statistics
Mississippi Valley State	Passing	Jaydyn Sisk	7/10, 110 yards, 1 TD
Mississippi Valley State	Rushing	Zamariyon Kendall	12 carries, 26 yards
Mississippi Valley State	Receiving	Nathan Rembert	4 receptions, 81 yards, 1 TD
Tennessee State	Passing	Draylen Ellis	21/33, 356 yards, 3 TD, 1 INT
Tennessee State	Rushing	Jaden McGill	7 carries, 41 yards
Tennessee State	Receiving	Jalal Dean	9 receptions, 144 yards, 1 TD

=== at No. 2 North Dakota State ===
Tennessee State Tigers (1–0) vs No. 2 North Dakota State Bison (0–1) – Game summary

Quarter	1	2	3	4	Total
Tigers	0	0	0	3	3
No. 2 Bison	14	21	3	14	52

at Fargodome • Fargo, ND

- Date: September 7, 2024
- Game time: 2:30 p.m.
- Game weather: Indoors, 70 °F (21 °C)
- Game attendance: 16,811
- Referee: David Hergert
- TV announcers (ESPN+): Dom Izzo, Kyle Emanuel, Sam Goetzinger

Game information

First quarter

- (6:47) NDSU – Cam Miller 24-yard run, Griffin Crosa kick (Drive: 12 plays, 77 yards, 6:21; North Dakota State 7–0)
- (2:20) NDSU – Bryce Lance 14-yard pass from Cam Miller, Griffin Crosa kick (Drive: 6 plays, 69 yards, 2:22; North Dakota State 14–0)

Second quarter

- (9:37) NDSU – CharMar Brown 3-yard run, Griffin Crosa kick (Drive: 4 plays, 4 yards, 2:02; North Dakota State 21–0)
- (3:13) NDSU – John Gores 12-yard pass from Cam Miller, Griffin Crosa kick (Drive: 8 plays, 76 yards, 4:04; North Dakota State 28–0)
- (0:16) NDSU – Bryce Lance 6-yard pass from Cam Miller, Griffin Crosa kick (Drive: 8 plays, 60 yards, 1:00; North Dakota State 35–0)

Third quarter

- (8:33) NDSU – Eli Ozick 51-yard field goal (Drive: 4 plays, 7 yards, 2:02; North Dakota State 38–0)

Fourth quarter

- (13:32) NDSU – Mekhi Collins 19-yard pass from Cole Payton, Eli Ozick kick (Drive: 4 plays, 30 yards, 1:30; North Dakota State 45–0)
- (10:46) NDSU – Nathan Hayes 51-yard run, Eli Ozick kick (Drive: 3 plays, 57 yards, 1:00; North Dakota State 52–0)
- (5:34) TNST – James Lowery 19-yard field goal (Drive: 9 plays, 74 yards, 5:12; North Dakota State 52–3)

Statistics	TNST	NDSU
First downs	12	21
Total yards	200	436
Rushing yards	72	226
Passing yards	128	210
Passing: Comp–Att–Int	17–25–0	17–23–1
Time of possession	29:46	30:14

Team	Category	Player	Statistics
Tennessee State	Passing	Draylen Ellis	17/25, 128 yards
Tennessee State	Rushing	Draylen Ellis	11 carries, 27 yards
Tennessee State	Receiving	Jalal Dean	3 receptions, 51 yards
North Dakota State	Passing	Cam Miller	14/18, 181 yards, 3 TD
North Dakota State	Rushing	Nathan Hayes	1 carry, 51 yards, TD
North Dakota State	Receiving	Bryce Lance	7 receptions, 106 yards, 2 TD

=== vs Arkansas-Pine Bluff ===
Arkansas-Pine Bluff Golden Lions (1–1) at Tennessee State Tigers (1–1) – Game summary

Quarter	1	2	3	4	Total
Golden Lions	7	7	14	0	28
Tigers	10	21	7	3	41

at Simmons Bank Liberty Stadium • Memphis, TN

- Date: September 14, 2024
- Game time: 6:00 p.m.
- Game weather: Sunny
- Game attendance: 27,584
- Referee: Y.N. Myers
- TV announcers (HBCU GO): Charlie Neal (play-by-play), Jon Kelley (analyst) and Lawrencia Moten (sideline)

Game information

First quarter

- (12:37) UAP – JaVonnie Gibson 33-yard pass from Mekhi Hagens, Trey Glymph kick (Drive: 7 plays, 75 yards, 2:23; Arkansas–Pine Bluff 7–0)
- (8:15) TSU – James Lowery 25-yard field goal (Drive: 9 plays, 62 yards, 4:22; Arkansas–Pine Bluff 7–3)
- (0:52) TSU – Jalen Rouse 3-yard run, James Lowery kick (Drive: 3 plays, 17 yards, 0:47; Tennessee State 10–7)

Second quarter

- (12:29) TSU – Karate Brenson 22-yard pass from Draylen Ellis, James Lowery kick (Drive: 6 plays, 75 yards, 2:31; Tennessee State 17–7)
- (10:11) UAP – Daemon Dawkins 30-yard pass from Mekhi Hagens, Trey Glymph kick (Drive: 6 plays, 75 yards, 2:18; Tennessee State 17–14)
- (6:41) TSU – Jordan Gant 12-yard pass from Draylen Ellis, James Lowery kick (Drive: 8 plays, 45 yards, 3:19; Tennessee State 24–14)
- (1:39) TSU – Jalal Dean 4-yard pass from Draylen Ellis, James Lowery kick (Drive: 5 plays, 26 yards, 1:28; Tennessee State 31–14)

Third quarter

- (12:19) TSU – CJ Evans 38-yard run, James Lowery kick (Drive: 7 plays, 72 yards, 2:33; Tennessee State 38–14)
- (9:37) UAP – Kevin English 5-yard pass from Mekhi Hagens, Trey Glymph kick (Drive: 7 plays, 75 yards, 2:42; Tennessee State 38–21)
- (0:49) UAP – Oshawn Ross 2-yard run, Trey Glymph kick (Drive: 4 plays, 17 yards, 4:25; Tennessee State 38–28)

Fourth quarter

- (7:46) TSU – James Lowery 40-yard field goal (Drive: 9 plays, 25 yards, 3:44; Tennessee State 41–28)

Statistics	UAPB	TNST
First downs	16	24
Total yards	329	424
Rushing yards	53	196
Passing yards	276	228
Passing: Comp–Att–Int	15–31–0	20–33–0
Time of possession	25:25	31:37

Team	Category	Player	Statistics
Arkansas–Pine Bluff	Passing	Mekhi Hagens	15/31, 276 yards, 3 TD
Arkansas–Pine Bluff	Rushing	Oshawn Ross	16 carries, 51 yards, TD
Arkansas–Pine Bluff	Receiving	JaVonnie Gibson	5 receptions, 149 yards, TD
Tennessee State	Passing	Draylen Ellis	20/33, 228 yards, 3 TD
Tennessee State	Rushing	CJ Evans	9 carries, 63 yards, TD
Tennessee State	Receiving	Bryant Williams	5 receptions, 88 yards

=== at Tennessee Tech ===
Tennessee State Tigers (2–1) vs Tennessee Tech Golden Eagles (0–2) – Game summary

Quarter	1	2	3	4	Total
Tigers	0	14	0	0	14
Golden Eagles	14	0	3	7	24

at Tucker Stadium • Cookeville, TN

- Date: September 21, 2024
- Game time: 1:30 p.m.
- Game weather: Cloudy, 88 °F (31 °C)
- Game attendance: 8,019
- Referee: Branden McCain
- TV announcers (ESPN+): Dylan Vazzano, Sam Brooks

Game information

First quarter
Second quarter
Third quarter
Fourth quarter

Statistics	TNST	TNTC
First downs	14	15
Total yards	246	314
Rushing yards	0	220
Passing yards	246	94
Passing: Comp–Att–Int	22–39–2	12–25–1
Time of possession	30:00	30:00

Team	Category	Player	Statistics
Tennessee State	Passing	Draylen Ellis	22/39, 246 yds, 1 TD, 2 INT
Tennessee State	Rushing	CJ Evans	6 carries, 14 yards
Tennessee State	Receiving	Karate Brenson	9 receptions, 99 yards
Tennessee Tech	Passing	Jordyn Potts	12/25, 94 yds, 1 INT
Tennessee Tech	Rushing	Obie Sanni	6 carries, 75 yards, 1 TD
Tennessee Tech	Receiving	D.J. Linkins	4 receptions, 39 yards

=== vs Charleston Southern ===
Charleston Southern Buccaneers (1–2) at Tennessee State Tigers (2–2) – Game summary

Quarter	1	2	3	4	Total
Buccaneers	0	6	3	0	9
Tigers	0	7	0	6	13

at Nissan Stadium • Nashville, TN

- Date: September 28, 2024
- Game time: 5:00 p.m.
- Game weather: Rain, 67 °F (19 °C)
- Game attendance: 1,853
- Referee: Drew Myers
- TV announcers (ESPN+): Dan Laing, Chris Sanders

Game information

First quarter
Second quarter
Third quarter
Fourth quarter

Statistics	CHSO	TNST
First downs	17	11
Total yards	309	206
Rushing yards	219	101
Passing yards	90	105
Passing: Comp–Att–Int	4–12–0	12–25–0
Time of possession	41:29	18:31

Team	Category	Player	Statistics
Charleston Southern	Passing	Kaleb Jackson	4/12, 90 yards
Charleston Southern	Rushing	Autavius Ison	33 carries, 157 yards
Charleston Southern	Receiving	Chris Rhone	2 receptions, 39 yards
Tennessee State	Passing	Draylen Ellis	12/24, 105 yards, 1 TD
Tennessee State	Rushing	Jordan Gant	5 carries, 40 yards, 1 TD
Tennessee State	Receiving	Bryant Williams	5 receptions, 49 yards, 1 TD

=== at Lindenwood ===
Tennessee State Tigers (3–2) vs Lindenwood Lions (2–3) – Game summary

Quarter	1	2	3	4	Total
Tigers	7	0	10	7	24
Lions	14	6	0	0	20

at Harlen C. Hunter Stadium • St. Charles, MO

- Date: October 5, 2024
- Game time: 1:00 p.m.
- Game weather: Sunny, 84 °F (29 °C)
- Game attendance: 3,103
- Referee: Matthew Jones
- TV announcers (ESPN+): Bob Ramsey, Zach Zook, Jacob Stanoch

Game information

First quarter
Second quarter
Third quarter
Fourth quarter

Statistics	TNST	LIN
First downs	15	14
Total yards	285	280
Rushing yards	89	181
Passing yards	196	99
Passing: Comp–Att–Int	14–26–1	11–20–0
Time of possession	31:33	28:27

Team	Category	Player	Statistics
Tennessee State	Passing	Draylen Ellis	14/26, 196 yards, 1 TD, 1 INT
Tennessee State	Rushing	Jaden McGill	15 carries, 63 yards
Tennessee State	Receiving	CJ Evans	3 receptions, 74 yards, 1 TD
Lindenwood	Passing	Nate Glantz	11/20, 99 yards, 1 TD
Lindenwood	Rushing	Steve Hall	7 carries, 67 yards
Lindenwood	Receiving	Jeff Caldwell	3 receptions, 45 yards, 1 TD

=== vs Eastern Illinois ===
Eastern Illinois Panthers (1–5) vs Tennessee State Tigers (4–2) – Game summary

Quarter	1	2	3	4	Total
Panthers	0	10	7	0	17
Tigers	0	20	14	7	41

at Nissan Stadium • Nashville, TN

- Date: October 12, 2024
- Game time: 5:00 p.m.
- Game weather: Sunny
- Game attendance: 10,715
- Referee: Michael Lennie
- TV announcers (ESPN+): Dan Laing, Chris Sanders

Game information

First quarter
Second quarter
Third quarter
Fourth quarter

Statistics	EIU	TNST
First downs	23	20
Total yards	435	365
Rushing yards	75	128
Passing yards	360	237
Passing: Comp–Att–Int	30–51–1	21–33–0
Time of possession	31:54	28:06

Team	Category	Player	Statistics
Eastern Illinois	Passing	Pierce Holley	28/46, 338 yards, 1 TD, 1 INT
Eastern Illinois	Rushing	MJ Flowers	21 carries, 57 yards, 1 TD
Eastern Illinois	Receiving	Cooper Willman	8 receptions, 141 yards
Tennessee State	Passing	Draylen Ellis	20/32, 224 yards, 4 TD
Tennessee State	Rushing	Jaden McGill	9 carries, 47 yards
Tennessee State	Receiving	Karate Brenson	6 receptions, 121 yards, 1 TD

=== at Howard ===
Tennessee State Tigers (5–2) at Howard Bison (3–3) – Game summary

Quarter	1	2	3	4	Total
Tigers	7	6	14	0	27
Bison	0	7	7	0	14

at William H. Greene Stadium • Washington, D.C.

- Date: October 19, 2024
- Game time: 2:30 p.m.
- Game weather: Sunny, 73 °F (23 °C)
- Game attendance: 9,995
- Referee: Jason Soistman
- TV announcers (ESPN+): Lynell Willingham, Melissa Kim

Game information

First quarter
Second quarter
Third quarter
Fourth quarter

Statistics	TNST	HOW
First downs	16	14
Total yards	412	209
Rushing yards	123	176
Passing yards	289	33
Passing: Comp–Att–Int	19–30–0	6–22–2
Time of possession	35:19	24:41

Team	Category	Player	Statistics
Tennessee State	Passing	Draylen Ellis	19/30, 289 yards
Tennessee State	Rushing	Jaden McGill	14 carries, 43 yards, 1 TD
Tennessee State	Receiving	Karate Brenson	5 receptions, 153 yards
Howard	Passing	Ja'Shawn Scroggins	6/21, 33 yards, 2 INT
Howard	Rushing	Jarett Hunter	15 carries, 102 yards, 1 TD
Howard	Receiving	Breylin Smith	4 receptions, 15 yards

=== vs UT Martin ===
UT Martin Skyhawks (5–3) at No. 25 Tennessee State Tigers (6–2) – Game summary

Quarter	1	2	3	4	Total
Skyhawks	21	7	0	0	28
No. 25 Tigers	14	0	7	0	21

at Nissan Stadium • Nashville, TN

- Date: November 2, 2024
- Game time: 5:00 p.m.
- Game weather: Sunny, 72 °F (22 °C)
- Game attendance: 2,845
- Referee: Zach Erdmann
- TV announcers (ESPN+): Dan Laing, Chris Sanders

Game information

First quarter

- (13:09) UTM – DeVonte Tanksley 35 yard pass from Kinkead Dent, Jaren Van Winkle kick (Drive: 4 plays, 67 yards, 1:44; UTM 7–0)
- (11:00) UTM – Zoe Roberts 33 yard pass from Kinkead Dent, Jaren Van Winkle kick (Drive: 2 plays, 55 yards, 0:39; UTM 14–0)
- (5:59) UTM – Scottie Alexander 33 yard pass from Kinkead Dent, Jaren Van Winkle kick (Drive: 6 plays, 79 yards, 2:55; UTM 21–0)
- (5:44) TNST – CJ Evans 98 yard kickoff return, James Lowery kick (UTM 21–7)
- (0:46) TNST – Bryant Williams 43 yard pass from Draylen Ellis, James Lowery kick (Drive: 6 plays, 92 yards, 2:20; UTM 21–14)

Second quarter

- (0:57) UTM – Kinkead Dent 3 yard run, Jaren Van Winkle kick (Drive: 11 plays, 91 yards, 5:23; UTM 28–14)

Third quarter

- (1:09) TNST – Jalal Dean 2 yard pass from Draylen Ellis, James Lowery kick (Drive: 5 plays, 32 yards, 2:00; UTM 28–21)

Fourth quarter

No scoring plays

Statistics	UTM	TNST
First downs	22	25
Total yards	370	354
Rushing yards	104	42
Passing yards	266	312
Passing: Comp–Att–Int	18–27–1	33–54–2
Time of possession	30:35	29:25

Team	Category	Player	Statistics
UT Martin	Passing	Kinkead Dent	18/27, 266 yds, 3 TD, 1 INT
UT Martin	Rushing	Patrick Smith	16 carries, 73 yards
UT Martin	Receiving	Tyler Dostin	4 receptions, 87 yards
Tennessee State	Passing	Draylen Ellis	33/53, 153 yds, 2 TD, 2 INT
Tennessee State	Rushing	Draylen Ellis	5 carries, 29 yards
Tennessee State	Receiving	Jalal Dean	11 receptions, 118 yards, 1 TD

=== at Western Illinois ===
Tennessee State Tigers (6–3) vs Western Illinois Leathernecks (3–6) – Game summary

Quarter	1	2	3	4	Total
Tigers	14	14	7	10	45
Leathernecks	0	13	0	7	20

at Hanson Field • Macomb, IL

- Date: November 9, 2024
- Game time: 1:00 p.m.
- Game weather: Rain, 56 °F (13 °C)
- Game attendance: 1,459
- Referee: Michael Frain
- TV announcers (ESPN+): Russ Eisenstein, Cannon Wynkoop, Caden Kratz

Game information

First quarter
Second quarter
Third quarter
Fourth quarter

Statistics	TNST	WIU
First downs	23	27
Total yards	376	432
Rushing yards	188	148
Passing yards	188	284
Passing: Comp–Att–Int	12–19–1	27–50–1
Time of possession	27:02	27:16

Team	Category	Player	Statistics
Tennessee State	Passing	Draylen Ellis	12/19, 188 yds, 2 TD, 1 INT
Tennessee State	Rushing	Tevin Carter	8 carries, 51 yards, 2 TD
Tennessee State	Receiving	Bryant Williams	3 receptions, 56 yards, 1 TD
Western Illinois	Passing	Nathan Lamb	24/45, 266 yds, 1 TD
Western Illinois	Rushing	Nathan Lamb	13 carries, 74 yards, 1 TD
Western Illinois	Receiving	Demari Davis	2 receptions, 62 yards

=== at Gardner-Webb ===
Tennessee State Tigers (7–3) vs Gardner–Webb Runnin' Bulldogs (4–6) – Game summary

Quarter	1	2	3	4	Total
Tigers	13	0	0	10	23
Runnin' Bulldogs	2	7	3	8	20

at Ernest W. Spangler Stadium •Boiling Springs, NC

- Date: November 16, 2024
- Game time: 3:00 p.m.
- Game weather: Sunny, 60 °F (16 °C)
- Game attendance: 3,763
- Referee: Drew Myers
- TV announcers (ESPN+): Justin Biegel, Jack DeLongchamps

Game information

First quarter

- (10:34) TNST – CJ Evans 23 yard pass from Draylen Ellis, James Lowery kick (Drive: 10 plays, 65 yards, 4:18; TNST 7–0)
- (2:50) TNST – Bryant Williams 17 yard pass from Draylen Ellis (Drive: 12 plays, 82 yards, 6:13; TNST 13–0)
- (2:50) GWEB – Miles Richardson return for defensive PAT (TNST 13–2)

Second quarter

- (9:37) GWEB – Carson Gresock 5 yard run, Jay Billingsley kick (Drive: 18 plays, 75 yards, 8:13; TNST 13–9)

Third quarter

- (2:28) GWEB – Jay Billingsley 40 yard field goal (Drive: 5 plays, 26 yards, 1:01; TNST 13–12)

Fourth quarter

- (14:53) TNST – Jaden McGill 1 yard run, James Lowery kick (Drive: 6 plays, 75 yards, 2:27; TNST 20–12)
- (4:33) TNST – James Lowery 30 yard field goal (Drive: 13 plays, 72 yards, 6:15; TNST 23–12)
- (1:41) GWEB – Edward Saydee 6 yard run, Tyler Ridell pass to Camden Overton for two-point conversion (Drive: 9 plays, 42 yards, 1:09; TNST 23–20)

Statistics	TNST	GWEB
First downs	19	18
Total yards	363	333
Rushing yards	143	126
Passing yards	220	207
Passing: Comp–Att–Int	18–31–0	19–43–1
Time of possession	32:19	27:41

Team	Category	Player	Statistics
Tennessee State	Passing	Draylen Ellis	18/28, 220 yds, 2 TD
Tennessee State	Rushing	Jaden McGill	15 carries, 100 yards, 1 TD
Tennessee State	Receiving	Karate Brenson	8 receptions, 82 yards
Gardner–Webb	Passing	Tyler Ridell	19/43, 207 yds, 1 INT
Gardner–Webb	Rushing	Edward Saydee	18 carries, 68 yards, 1 TD
Gardner–Webb	Receiving	Camden Overton	7 receptions, 74 yards

=== vs No. 12 Southeast Missouri State ===
No. 12 Southeast Missouri State Redhawks (9–2) at Tennessee State Tigers (8–3) – Game summary

Quarter	1	2	3	4	Total
No. 12 Redhawks	0	14	0	7	21
Tigers	21	0	0	7	28

at Nissan Stadium • Nashville, TN

- Date: November 23, 2024
- Game time: 3:30 p.m.
- Game weather: Sunny, 53 °F (12 °C)
- Game attendance: 1,536
- Referee: Brad Carrell
- TV announcers (ESPN+): Dan Laing, Chris Sanders

Game information

First quarter

- (9:34) TNST – Jalal Dean 7 yard pass from Draylen Ellis, James Lowery kick (Drive: 12 plays, 51 yards, 5:17; TNST 7–0)
- (7:08) TNST – Keandre Booker fumble return, James Lowery kick (TNST 14–0)
- (2:35) TNST – CJ Evans 56 yard pass from Draylen Ellis, James Lowery kick (Drive: 2 plays, 57 yards, 0:36; TNST 21–0)

Second quarter

- (7:56) SEMO – Dorian Anderson 31 yard pass from Paxton DeLaurent, DC Pippin kick (Drive: 9 plays, 69 yards, 3:48; TNST 21–7)
- (0:52) SEMO – Payton Brown 13 yard pass from Paxton DeLaurent, DC Pippin kick (Drive: 12 plays, 73 yards, 4:38; TNST 21–14)

Third quarter

No scoring plays

Fourth quarter

- (14:45) TNST – Draylen Ellis 42 yard run, James Lowery kick (Drive: 5 plays, 77 yards, 2:06; TNST 28–14)
- (6:56) SEMO – Payton Brown 1 yard run, DC Pippin kick (Drive: 6 plays, 49 yards, 2:00; TNST 28–21)

Statistics	SEMO	TNST
First downs	18	19
Total yards	308	347
Rushing yards	75	115
Passing yards	233	232
Passing: Comp–Att–Int	27–47–0	20–32–0
Time of possession	28:17	31:43

Team	Category	Player	Statistics
Southeast Missouri State	Passing	Paxton DeLaurent	27/46, 233 yards, 2 TD
Southeast Missouri State	Rushing	Payton Brown	10 carries, 45 yards, 1 TD
Southeast Missouri State	Receiving	Tristan Smith	8 receptions, 70 yards
Tennessee State	Passing	Draylen Ellis	20/31, 232 yards, 2 TD
Tennessee State	Rushing	Jaden McGill	18 carries, 73 yards
Tennessee State	Receiving	CJ Evans	6 receptions, 107 yards, 1 TD

=== at No. 13 Montana (NCAA Division I Playoff–First Round) ===
NCAA Division I Playoff–First Round – No. 21 Tennessee State Tigers (9–3) at No. 13 Montana Grizzlies (8–4) – Game summary

Quarter	1	2	3	4	Total
No. 21 Tigers	3	0	10	14	27
No. 13 Grizzlies	3	13	11	14	41

at Washington–Grizzly Stadium • Missoula, MT

- Date: Saturday November 30, 2024
- Game time: 9:15 p.m.
- Game weather: Clear, 32 °F (0 °C)
- Game attendance: 12,479
- Referee: David Hergert
- TV announcers (ESPN+): Roxy Bernstein (play-by-play) and Jay Walker (analyst)

Game information

First quarter

- (9:34) MONT – Ty Morrison 39 yard field goal (Drive: 5 plays, 29 yards, 1:49; MONT 3–0)
- (0:03) TNST – James Lowery 37 yard field goal (Drive: 10 plays, 57 yards, 4:44; TIED 3–3)

Second quarter

- (4:35) MONT – Eli Gillman 7 yard run, Ty Morrison kick (Drive: 10 plays, 67 yards, 4:23; MONT 10–3)
- (0:10) MONT – Ty Morrison 31 yard field goal (Drive: 5 plays, 23 yards, 2:34; MONT 13–3)
- (0:00) MONT – Ty Morrison 50 yard field goal (Drive: 2 plays, 0 yards, 0:07; MONT 16–3)

Third quarter

- (6:44) TNST – James Lowery 26 yard field goal (Drive: 5 plays, 28 yards, 2:29; MONT 16–6)
- (3:08) MONT – Ty Morrison 30 yard field goal (Drive: 11 plays, 57 yards, 3:30; MONT 19–6)
- (1:28) MONT – Junior Bergen 52 yard punt return, Logan Fife run for two-point conversion (MONT 27–6)
- (1:02) TNST – Karate Brenson 3 yard pass from Draylen Ellis, James Lowery kick (Drive: 1 play, 12 yards, 0:13; MONT 27–13)

Fourth quarter

- (14:41) TNST – Draylen Ellis 11 yard run, James Lowery kick (Drive: 1 play, 11 yards, 0:06; MONT 27–20)
- (6:21) MONT – Junior Bergen 54 yard punt return, Ty Morrison kick (MONT 34–20)
- (3:03) TNST – Karate Brenson 15 yard pass from Draylen Ellis, James Lowery kick (Drive: 11 plays, 75 yards, 3:11; MONT 34–27)
- (1:58) MONT – Eli Gillman 59 yard run, Ty Morrison kick (Drive: 2 plays, 64 yards, 0:55; MONT 41–27)

Statistics	TNST	MONT
First downs	18	19
Total yards	310	369
Rushing yards	14	254
Passing yards	296	115
Passing: Comp–Att–Int	29–39–1	12–23–0
Time of possession	29:48	30:12

Team	Category	Player	Statistics
Tennessee State	Passing	Draylen Ellis	29/39, 296 yards, 2 TD, 1 INT
Tennessee State	Rushing	CJ Evans	6 carries, 26 yards
Tennessee State	Receiving	Karate Brenson	11 receptions, 122 yards, 2 TD
Montana	Passing	Logan Fife	11/22, 97 yards
Montana	Rushing	Eli Gillman	20 carries, 136 yards, 2 TD
Montana	Receiving	Sawyer Racanelli	2 receptions, 35 yards
