= Chris Merritt (American football) =

American football coach (born 1969)

Current position
- Title: Head coach
- Team: Bryant
- Conference: CAA
- Record: 33–48

Biographical details
- Born: December 7, 1969 (age 56)

Playing career
- 1988–1992: Indiana
- 1994–1995: Gavle Red Devils Sweden
- 1996–1997: Hamburg Blue Devils
- Position: Free safety

Coaching career (HC unless noted)
- 1993: Eastern Illinois (assistant)
- 1996–1998: Hamburg Blue Devils (DC)
- 1999: Stuttgart Scorpions
- 2000: Thiel (DB)
- 2001–2018: Christopher Columbus HS (FL)
- 2019–present: Bryant

Head coaching record
- Overall: 33–48 (college); 52–11–1 (GFL); 165–49 (Note: Christopher Columbus ended the 2002 season 7–3 but had to forfeit three wins due to an ineligible player.) (high school)

Chris Merritt (born December 7, 1969) is an American football coach and former player. He was named to the position as the head football coach at Bryant University in December 2018. He came to Bryant after serving 18 years as head coach at Christopher Columbus High School in Miami, Florida, posting a record of 165–49 in 18 seasons there. He also served five years at Thiel College as the defensive backs coach and special teams coordinator and two years at Eastern Illinois University as an assistant coach. He also played and was a coach in the German Football League with the Hamburg Blue Devils winning the German Bowl and Eurobowl championships.

== Football career ==
Merritt played college football at Indiana where he was afour-year letter winner. He played professionally in Sweden's Superserien in the 1994 and 1995 seasons. He the played and was a coach in the German Football League where he guided the Hamburg Blue Devils, winning 3 Eurobowl titles in 1996, 1997 and 1998, a German Bowl in 1996 and three-straight Charity Bowl Championships. Merritt is the franchise's all-time leader in wins and winning percentage.

He then coached the Stuttgart Scorpions and Thiel College.

In 2001 he became the head coach of Christopher Columbus HS. During his tenure, he led the school to two state finals appearances (2014, 2018), five Regional Championships, 14 District Championships and an 80–4 record in district competition in the largest high school classification in the state of Florida. In addition, Merritt's program has produced over 100 collegiate football players in 18 seasons. He also received a plethora of honors including being inducted into the Columbus High School Hall of Fame in 2018; being named the Nike Coach of the Year in 2005, the Miami Herald Coach of the Year in 2014, and the Warren Henry South Coach of the Year in 2017.

He was then hired as head coach of Bryant for the 2018 season. In 2021, he went 7–4 and was a finalist for the Eddie Robinson Coach of the Year Award. In 2025, he led the program to a 27–26 win over UMass, their first-ever win over an FBS program.

== Head coaching record ==
=== College ===
Year	Team	Overall	Conference	Standing	Bowl/playoffs
Bryant Bulldogs (Northeast Conference) (2019–2022)
2019	Bryant	4–8	3–4	T–5th	
2020–21	Bryant	2–2	2–2	T–3rd	
2021	Bryant	7–4	5–2	2nd	
2022	Bryant	4–7	2–3	T–3rd	
Bryant Bulldogs (Big South–OVC Football Association) (2023)
2023	Bryant	6–5	4–2	T–3rd	
Bryant Bulldogs (Coastal Athletic Association Football Conference) (2024–present)
2024	Bryant	2–10	0–8	T–15th	
2025	Bryant	3–9	1–7	T-12th	
2026	Bryant	5–3	3–1		
Bryant:		33–48	20–29		
Total:		33–48			

=== High school ===
Year	Team	Overall	Conference	Standing	Bowl/playoffs
Christopher Columbus Explorers () (2001–2018)
2001	Christopher Columbus	9–3		1st	
2002	Christopher Columbus	4–6		3rd	
2003	Christopher Columbus	7–4			
2004	Christopher Columbus	7–3	4–0	1st	
2005	Christopher Columbus	9–1	5–0	1st	
2006	Christopher Columbus	7–4	4–1	2nd	
2007	Christopher Columbus	11–1	5–0	1st	
2008	Christopher Columbus	8–1	4–0	1st	
2009	Christopher Columbus	9–2	5–0	1st	
2010	Christopher Columbus	11–1	5–0	1st	
2011	Christopher Columbus	11–2	3–0	1st	
2012	Christopher Columbus	8–5	3–0	1st	
2013	Christopher Columbus	7–5	4–1	2nd	
2014	Christopher Columbus	14–2	6–0	1st	
2015	Christopher Columbus	12–2	4–1	1st	
2016	Christopher Columbus	7–4	4–1	2nd	
2017	Christopher Columbus	10–2	4–0	1st	
2018	Christopher Columbus	14–1	4–0	1st	
Christopher Columbus:		165–49			
Total:		165–49			
National championship Conference title Conference division title or championship game berth
