= Dewayne Alexander =

American football coach

Current position
- Title: Tight ends/Assistant head coach
- Team: Bowling Green
- Conference: MAC

Biographical details
- Education: Tennessee Tech University (1989, 1998)

Playing career
- 1985–1987: Tennessee Tech

Coaching career (HC unless noted)
- 1988–1995: Hendersonville HS (TN) (assistant)
- 1996: Jackson County HS (TN)
- 1997–1998: Tennessee Tech (GA)
- 1999–2000: Upperman HS (TN)
- 2001: Gallatin HS (TN) (OC)
- 2002: Tennessee Tech (DL)
- 2003–2005: Wilson Central HS (TN)
- 2006–2012: Cumberland
- 2013–2015: Tennessee Tech (AHC/OL)
- 2016: Cumberland (OC/QB/RB)
- 2017: East Tennessee State (OL)
- 2018–2023: Tennessee Tech
- 2024: Sewanee (OL/RGC)
- 2025–present: Bowling Green (AHC/TE)

Head coaching record
- Overall: 61–76 (college)

Accomplishments and honors

Championships
- 1 MSC West Division (2008)

Awards
- American Football Coaches Association's NAIA Region 1 Coach of the Year (2010); Head Coach for NAIA East All star team (2010); Tennessee Sports Writers Association's Coach of the Year (2011)

Dewayne Alexander is an American college football coach. He is the Tight ends/Assistant head coach for Bowling Green State University, a position he has held since 2025. He was the head football coach at Tennessee Tech, a position he held from 2018 to 2023. Prior to Tennessee Tech, Alexander served as head football coach at Cumberland University in Lebanon, Tennessee, where he compiled a record of 41–33. Alexander played college football at Tennessee Tech from 1985 to 1987. He was named head football coach at Tennessee Tech on December 22, 2017. Alexander was fired from Tennessee Tech on November 21, 2023 after six seasons.

== Head coaching record ==
=== College ===
| Year | Team | Overall | Conference | Standing | Bowl/playoffs | NAIA^{#} |
|---|---|---|---|---|---|---|
Cumberland Bulldogs (Mid-South Conference) (2006–2012)
| 2006 | Cumberland | 4–6 | 2–3 | T–3rd (West) | | |
| 2007 | Cumberland | 3–7 | 2–3 | T–4th (West) | | |
| 2008 | Cumberland | 6–5 | 4–1 | T–1st (West) | | |
| 2009 | Cumberland | 5–6 | 3–3 | T–4th (West) | | |
| 2010 | Cumberland | 8–3 | 4–2 | 2nd (West) | | 23 |
| 2011 | Cumberland | 7–3 | 4–2 | T–2nd (West) | | 25 |
| 2012 | Cumberland | 8–3 | 4–2 | 2nd (West) | | 19 |
| Cumberland: | | 41–33 | 23–16 | | | |
Tennessee Tech Golden Eagles (Ohio Valley Conference) (2018–2022)
| 2018 | Tennessee Tech | 1–10 | 1–7 | 9th | | |
| 2019 | Tennessee Tech | 6–6 | 3–5 | 5th | | |
| 2020–21 | Tennessee Tech | 2–5 | 2–5 | T–6th | | |
| 2021 | Tennessee Tech | 3–8 | 1–5 | T–6th | | |
| 2022 | Tennessee Tech | 4–7 | 2–3 | T–3rd | | |
Tennessee Tech Golden Eagles (Big South–OVC Football Association) (2023)
| 2023 | Tennessee Tech | 4–7 | 2–4 | T–6th | | |
| Tennessee Tech: | | 20–43 | 11–29 | | | |
| Total: | | 61–76 | | | | |
National championship Conference title Conference division title or championship game berth
