= Eddie George =

American football player and coach and actor (born 1973)

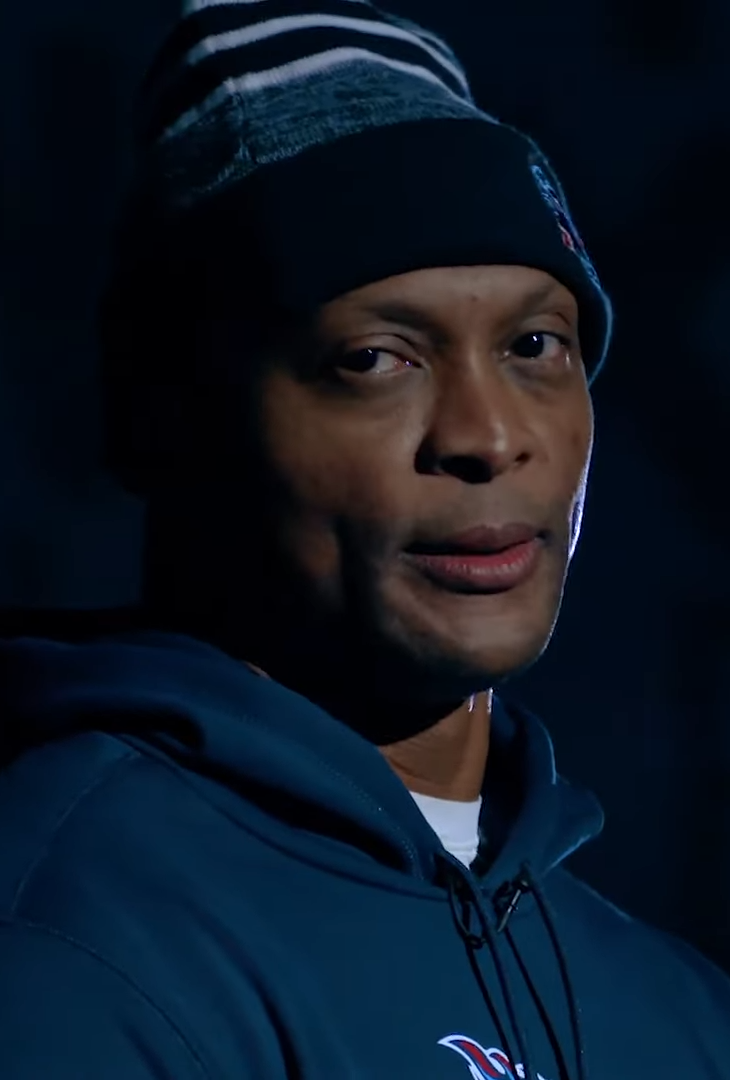
- George in 2022

Bowling Green Falcons
- Title: Head coach

Personal information
- Born: September 24, 1973 (age 53); Philadelphia, Pennsylvania, U.S.
- Listed height: 6 ft 3 in (1.91 m)
- Listed weight: 235 lb (107 kg)

Career information
- Position: Running back (No. 27)
- High school: Fork Union Military (Fork Union, Virginia)
- College: Ohio State (1992–1995)
- NFL draft: 1996: 1st round, 14th overall pick

Career history

Playing
- Houston / Tennessee Oilers / Titans (1996–2003); Dallas Cowboys (2004)

Coaching
- Tennessee State (2021–2024) Head coach; Bowling Green (2025–present) Head coach

Awards and highlights
- NFL Offensive Rookie of the Year (1996); First-team All-Pro (2000); Second-team All-Pro (1999); 4× Pro Bowl (1997–2000); Titans/Oilers Ring of Honor; Tennessee Titans No. 27 retired; Heisman Trophy (1995); Unanimous All-American (1995); Big Ten Male Athlete of the Year (1996); Ohio State Buckeyes No. 27 retired; Big South–OVC Coach of the Year (2024)

Career NFL statistics
- Rushing yards: 10,441
- Rushing average: 3.6
- Rushing touchdowns: 68
- Receptions: 268
- Receiving yards: 2,227
- Receiving touchdowns: 10
- Stats at Pro Football Reference

Head coaching record
- Regular season: 31–37 (.456)
- Postseason: 0–1 (.000)
- Career: 31–38 (.449)
- College Football Hall of Fame

Edward Nathan George Jr. (born September 24, 1973) is an American football coach and former running back who is currently the head coach at Bowling Green State University. He previously served as the head coach of the Tennessee State University from 2021 to 2024. George played college football for Ohio State University from 1992 to 1995. He played professionally in the National Football League (NFL) for nine seasons from 1996 to 2004, primarily for the Tennessee Titans franchise.

As a senior in 1995, he led Ohio State to the Florida Citrus Bowl and won the Heisman Trophy. George was inducted to the College Football Hall of Fame in 2011 as a player, and the International Sports Hall of Fame in 2020.

The Houston Oilers selected George in the first round (14th overall) of the 1996 NFL draft. He played nine seasons as a running back in the NFL, with the Tennessee Titans (both in Tennessee and in Houston when the franchise was known as the Houston Oilers) and Dallas Cowboys for a single season in 2004. In 1999, after the franchise moved to Tennessee, he led the Titans to an appearance in Super Bowl XXXIV, was selected to the Pro Bowl, and was honored as a second-team All-Pro.

After football, George earned an MBA from Northwestern University's Kellogg School of Management. In 2015, he guest-starred on an episode of the IFC satirical talk show Comedy Bang! Bang!, titled "Eddie George Wears a Navy Suit and Half-Zip Pullover." The following year, George appeared on Broadway in the musical Chicago as the hustling lawyer Billy Flynn.

== Early life ==
George was born in Philadelphia. He played Pop Warner football for the Abington Raiders. He attended Abington Senior High School until the 10th grade, and then transferred to Fork Union Military Academy. George made the decision to stay at Fork Union Military Academy for a fifth preparatory school year or postgraduate year. Such choices are commonly made by high-school football players hoping to improve their recruitment status with colleges, but for George, it meant another year of the rigorous military lifestyle. He rushed for 1,372 yards in his postgraduate season at FUMA, attracting the attention of several major colleges.

In 2024, George was inducted into the National High School Football Hall of Fame.

== College career ==
George attended Ohio State University, where he majored in landscape architecture and played for the Ohio State Buckeyes football team. As a freshman, George scored three rushing touchdowns in a win over Syracuse, but suffered a major setback in a game against Illinois. In that game, George lost a fumble at the Illinois four-yard line that was returned 96 yards for a touchdown. Later in the game, with Ohio State leading by two points in the final quarter, George fumbled again, this time on Illinois' one-yard line. Illinois recovered the fumble and drove for the game-winning touchdown.

Before the Illinois game, George had carried the ball 25 times and scored five touchdowns, but he had only 12 more rushing attempts and no more touchdowns for the rest of the year. The following season, George was listed in the depth chart as the team's third-string running back, behind Raymont Harris. George carried the ball just 42 times, mostly when Ohio State had a large lead late in games, but showed his potential by averaging 5.3 yards per carry. As a junior, George became the team's starting running back and went on to rush for 1,442 yards and 12 touchdowns.

As a senior in 1995, George rushed for a school-record 1,927 yards and 24 touchdowns, an average of 148.23 yards per game, while also catching 47 passes for 417 yards and another touchdown (George only caught 16 passes in his first three seasons). That season, he co-led the nation with 23 rushing touchdowns and led the nation in scoring with 150 points. One of his best performances of the year was in a 45–26 victory over Notre Dame, where George rushed for 207 yards, his third 200-yard game of the season. George also rushed for a school-record 314 yards and scored three touchdowns in OSU's victory over Illinois.

In the three years after his two fumbles as a freshman, George had over 600 rushing attempts and fumbled only six times. Ohio State finished the season with an 11–2 record. He was recognized as a unanimous All-American. George won the Heisman Trophy in the closest vote in the history of the award at the time, beating Nebraska's Tommie Frazier by 264 votes. George left Ohio State second in school history in career rushing yards (3,768) and third in rushing touchdowns (44). Overall, he finished with 4,284 all-purpose yards, 45 touchdowns, and a 5.5 yards per carry average.

== Professional career ==
Pre-draft measurables
Height	Weight	Arm length	Hand span
6 ft 2 5/8 in (1.90 m)	238 lb (108 kg)	33 1/4 in (0.84 m)	10 1/8 in (0.26 m)
All values from NFL Combine

=== Houston / Tennessee Oilers / Titans ===
The Houston Oilers selected George in the first round (14th overall) of the 1996 NFL draft. In order to secure the acquisition of George, the Oilers traded their original first round pick (17th overall) and defensive tackle Glenn Montgomery to the Seattle Seahawks and in return received the first round pick (14th overall) used to immediately draft George. He was the third running back drafted in 1996, following Lawrence Phillips (6th overall) and Tim Biakabutuka (8th overall).

George won the NFL Rookie of the Year award in 1996, and was the Oilers/Titans' starting tailback through 2003, never missing a start. He made the Pro Bowl four consecutive years (1997–2000), and assisted the Titans to a championship appearance in Super Bowl XXXIV, where they lost to the St. Louis Rams 23–16. George gained 391 combined rushing and receiving yards in the Titans' three playoff games that year, and went on to rush for 95 yards, catching two passes for 35 yards, and scoring two touchdowns in the Super Bowl.

George is only the second NFL running back to rush for 10,000 yards while never missing a start, joining Jim Brown. Only Walter Payton (170) started more consecutive regular-season games than George's 130.

Although George rushed for 1,000 yards in all but one season, numerous sportswriters suggested that a heavy workload caused a decline in his productivity. In five of his eight seasons with the Titans, George carried the ball over 330 times. In 2001, George averaged just 2.98 per carry, the fourth-lowest number in league history among running backs with more than 200 rushing attempts in a season. His decline in production and several toe and ankle injuries were contributing factors in Titans' owner Bud Adams' decision to release George on July 21, 2004, in part due to salary cap considerations, after he would not agree to a pay cut.

=== Dallas Cowboys ===
On July 23, 2004, George signed a one-year contract with the Dallas Cowboys for $1.5 million, plus incentives that could have earned him more than the $4.25 million he would have made under his previous contract with the Titans. George only started eight games while rookie Julius Jones was out for two months with a fractured scapula. George became the backup running back when Jones returned midway through the season, finishing with 432 yards on 132 carries and four touchdowns.

=== Retirement ===
George officially announced his retirement in 2006. His career totals include 2,865 carries for 10,441 yards and 68 touchdowns to go along with 268 receptions for 2,227 yards and 10 touchdowns.

In 2019, George had his number 27 jersey number retired by the Titans, along with his former teammate Steve McNair’s number 9 jersey. In 2021, George became a semifinalist (of the 26-person modern-era list) for the Pro Football Hall of Fame, the first time he had made the stage since he was eligible.

== Career statistics ==
Legend
	Led the league
**Bold**	Career high

=== NFL ===
==== Regular season ====
Year	Team	Games		Rushing					Receiving					Fumbles	
Year	Team	GP	GS	Att	Yds	Avg	Lng	TD	Rec	Yds	Avg	Lng	TD	Fum	Lost
1996	HOU	16	16	335	1,368	**4.1**	**76**	8	23	182	7.9	17	0	3	2
1997	TEN	16	16	357	1,399	3.9	30	6	7	44	6.3	15	1	4	3
1998	TEN	16	16	348	1,294	3.7	37T	5	37	310	8.4	29	1	7	1
1999	TEN	16	16	320	1,304	**4.1**	40	9	47	**458**	**9.7**	**54T**	**4**	5	4
2000	TEN	16	16	**403**	**1,509**	3.7	35T	**14**	**50**	453	9.1	24	2	5	3
2001	TEN	16	16	315	939	3.0	27	5	37	279	7.5	25	0	**8**	**6**
2002	TEN	16	16	343	1,165	3.4	35	12	36	255	7.1	14T	2	1	1
2003	TEN	16	16	312	1,031	3.3	27	5	22	163	7.4	22	0	1	0
2004	DAL	13	8	132	432	3.3	24	4	9	83	9.2	28	0	3	1
Career		141	136	2,865	10,441	3.6	76	68	268	2,227	8.3	54T	10	37	21

==== Postseason ====
Year	Team	Games		Rushing					Receiving					Fumbles	
Year	Team	GP	GS	Att	Yds	Avg	Lng	TD	Rec	Yds	Avg	Lng	TD	Fum	Lost
1999	TEN	4	4	**108**	**449**	**4.2**	**68T**	**3**	**10**	**72**	7.2	**32**	0	**2**	**2**
2000	TEN	1	1	27	91	3.4	15	1	8	52	6.5	10	0	0	0
2002	TEN	2	2	30	100	3.3	17	1	1	9	**9.0**	9	0	**2**	**2**
2003	TEN	2	2	41	136	3.3	13	0	4	16	4.0	6	0	0	0
Career		9	9	206	776	3.8	68T	5	23	149	6.5	32	0	4	4

=== College ===
Season	Team	GP	Rushing				Receiving		
Season	Team	GP	Att	Yds	Avg	TD	Rec	Yds	TD
1992	Ohio State	11	37	176	4.8	5	—	—	—
1993	Ohio State	12	42	223	5.3	3	—	—	—
1994	Ohio State	13	276	1,442	5.2	12	16	117	0
1995	Ohio State	13	**328**	**1,927**	**5.9**	**24**	**47**	**417**	**1**
Career		49	683	3,768	5.5	44	63	534	1

== Career highlights ==
=== Awards and honors ===
As a player

- NFL Offensive Rookie of the Year (1996)
- First-team All-Pro (2000)
- Second-team All-Pro (1999)
- 4× Pro Bowl (1997–2000)
- PFWA All-Rookie Team (1996)
- Titans/Oilers Ring of Honor
- Tennessee Titans No. 27 retired
- Heisman Trophy (1995)
- Walter Camp Award (1995)
- Maxwell Award (1995)
- Doak Walker Award (1995)
- Unanimous All-American (1995)
- NCAA rushing touchdowns co-leader (1995)
- NCAA scoring leader (1995)
- Big Ten Male Athlete of the Year (1996)
- Big Ten Most Valuable Player (1995)
- Big Ten Offensive Player of the Year (1995)
- First-team All-Big Ten (1995)
- Ohio State Buckeyes No. 27 retired

As a coach

- Big South–OVC champion (2024)
- Big South–OVC Coach of the Year (2024)

=== Titans franchise records ===
As of the 2017 NFL off-season, George still held at least 28 Titans franchise records, including:

- Most Rush Attempts (career): 2,733
- Most Rush Attempts (season): 403 (2000)
- Most Rush Attempts (playoff career): 206
- Most Rush Attempts (playoff season): 108 (1999)
- Most Rush Attempts (playoff game): 29 (2000-01-08 BUF)
- Most Rush Attempts (rookie season): 335 (1996)
- Most Rush Attempts (game, as a rookie): 28 (1996-12-01 @NYJ; tied with Earl Campbell)
- Most Rush Yards (career): 10,009
- Most Rush Yards (playoff career): 776
- Most Rush Yards (playoff season): 449 (1999)
- Most Rushing TDs (playoff season): 3 (1999; tied with Steve McNair)
- Most Rushing TDs (playoff game): 2 (2000-01-30 NSTL)
- Most Rush Yds/Game (playoff career): 86.2
- Most Rush Yds/Game (playoff season): 112.2 (1999)
- Most Total TDs (career): 74
- Most Total TDs (playoff season): 3 (1999; tied with Steve McNair x2)
- Most Yds from Scrimmage (career): 12,153
- Most Yds from Scrimmage (playoff career): 925
- Most Yds from Scrimmage (playoff season): 521 (1999)
- Most Yds from Scrimmage (rookie season): 1,550 (1996)
- Most All Purpose Yds (career): 12,154
- Most All Purpose Yds (playoff season): 521 (1999)
- Most 100+ yard rushing games (playoffs): 2
- Most Games with 1+ TD scored (career): 59
- Most Games with 2+ TD scored (career): 17 (Tied with Earl Campbell)
- Most Games with 3+ TD scored (season): 3 (2000)
- Most 1000+ rushing yard seasons: 7

== Coaching career ==
George was named the head coach at Tennessee State on April 13, 2021. He signed a five-year deal that paid $400,000 annually. In 2024, his fourth year as Tennessee State head coach, George was named Big South–OVC Coach of the Year.

In 2025, George was hired as the head coach of Bowling Green State University in the Mid-American Conference.

On October 11, 2025, Eddie George's Falcons came back from down 21–0 in the second quarter to defeat Toledo, 28–23, giving George a 1–0 record in the Battle of I-75 rivalry series.

=== Head coaching record ===
Year	Team	Overall	Conference	Standing	Bowl/playoffs	Coaches^{#}	AP^{°}
Tennessee State Tigers (Ohio Valley Conference) (2021–2022)
2021	Tennessee State	5–6	3–3	T–4th			
2022	Tennessee State	4–7	2–3	T–3rd			
Tennessee State Tigers (Big South–OVC Football Association) (2023–2024)
2023	Tennessee State	6–5	2–4	T–6th			
2024	Tennessee State	9–4	6–2	T–1st	L NCAA Division I First Round		
Tennessee State:		24–22	13–12				
Bowling Green Falcons (Mid-American Conference) (2025–present)
2025	Bowling Green	4–8	2–6	T–11th			
2026	Bowling Green	3–8	3–4				
Bowling Green:		7–16	5–10				
Total:		31–38					

== Acting ==
George's television appearances include Coach (1989), In the House (1995), Rock Me Baby (2003), Training Camp (2005), NCIS: Los Angeles (2009), Reed Between the Lines (2011), My Life as a Dad (2014) and Magnum P.I. (2018). His film appearances include Into the Sun (2005), The Game Plan (2007), Knife Fight (2012), "Eddie George Really Loves Soda" (short, 2014), The Road You're Going Down (2017), Walk of Fame (2017), Dark Roads 79 (2017), Run the Race (2018), Another Version of You (2018), Big Fan Begins (2019), and Under the Stadium Lights (2021).

In 2015, George guest-starred on an episode of the IFC satirical talk show Comedy Bang! Bang!, titled "Eddie George Wears a Navy Suit and Half-Zip Pullover." The following year, he appeared for six weeks on Broadway in the musical Chicago as the hustling lawyer Billy Flynn.

In 2016–2017, George played himself – albeit in a story line where he was a former NFL star who'd lost millions of dollars in a real estate deal – in two episodes of the HBO series Ballers.

== Personal life ==
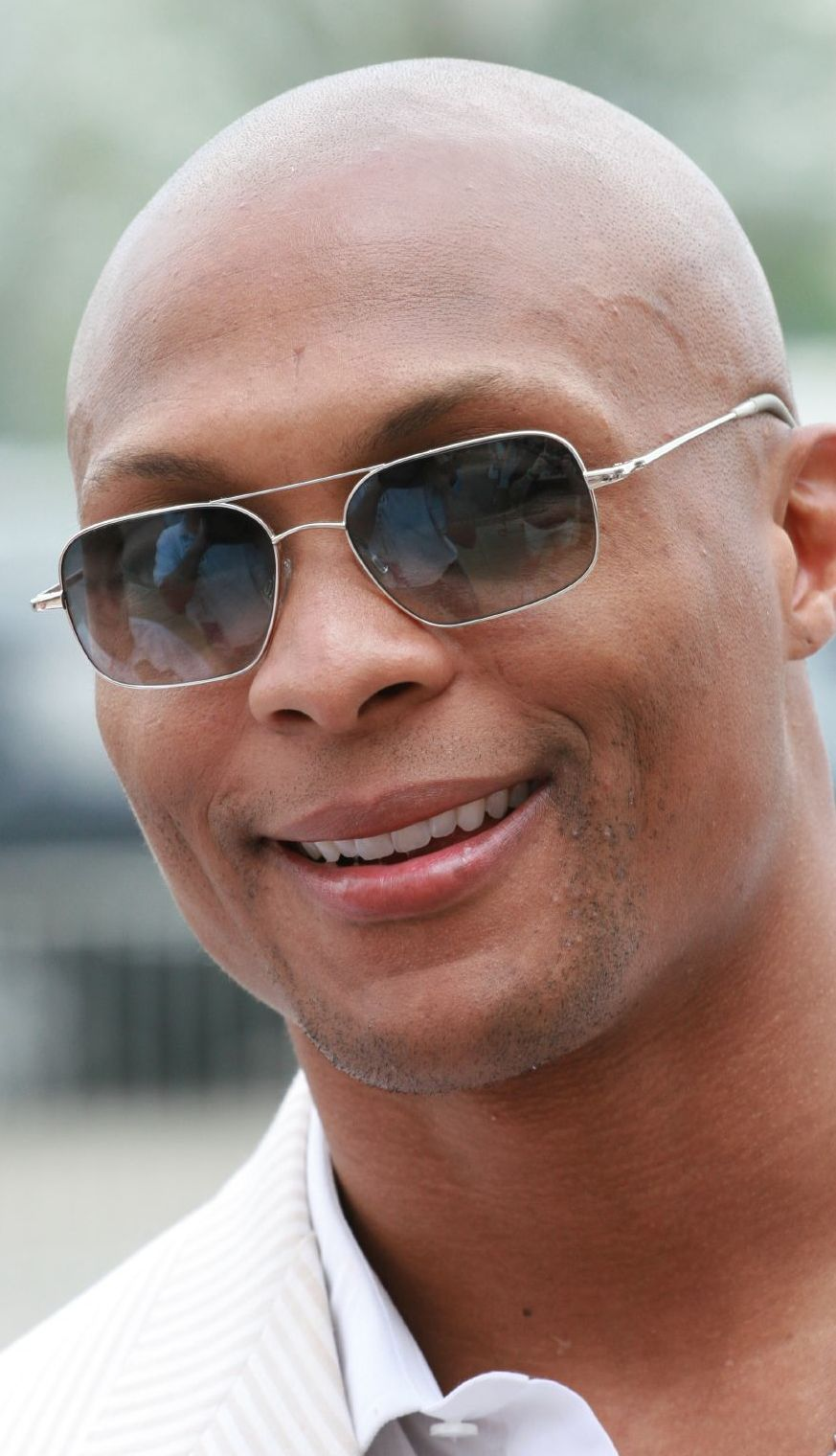
George in 2007

On October 1, 2006, George was appointed spokesperson for Tennessee's GetFitTN program by Governor Phil Bredesen. The initiative is aimed at preventing type 2 diabetes and promotion of healthier, more active lifestyles. On Saturday, April 28, 2007, George ran the Country Music Half Marathon (ending just outside then LP Field, now Nissan Stadium) in an unofficial time of 2:04:08.

In 2008, George campaigned for Senator Barack Obama's presidential bid.

After retiring from football, George went back to complete his bachelor's degree in landscape architecture from Ohio State. George later graduated from the Kellogg School of Management at Northwestern University, earning his MBA degree from its Executive MBA program.

In 2004, George married American singer, rapper, actress, and author Tamara "Taj" Johnson, formerly of the group SWV (Sisters with Voices) and later being a contestant on the 18th season of the CBS reality show Survivor. On the 12th episode, "The Ultimate Sacrifice", George surprised his wife by visiting her on Exile Island.

== See also ==
- List of NCAA major college football yearly scoring leaders
