= 2023 Charleston Southern Buccaneers football team =

American college football season

2023 Charleston Southern Buccaneers football
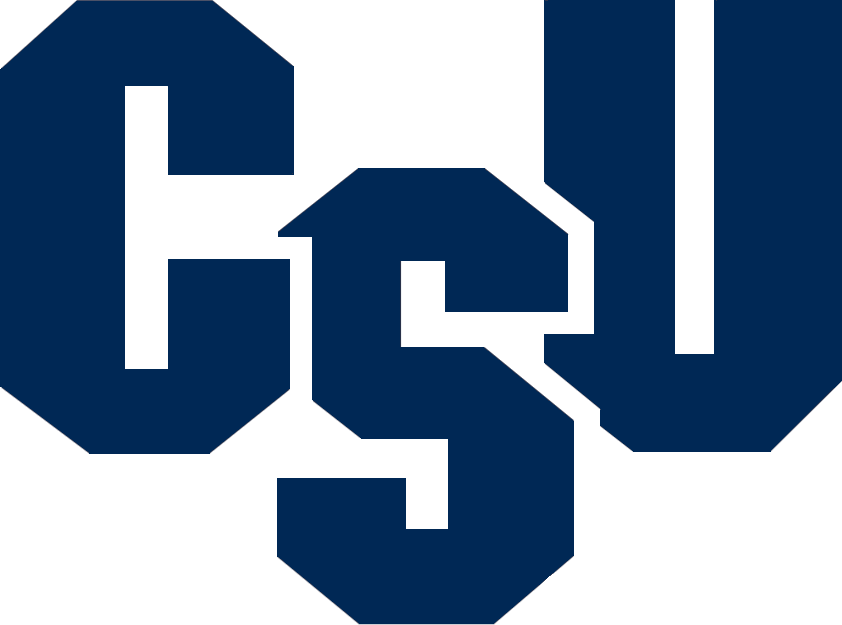
- Conference: Big South–OVC football
- Record: 4–7 (2–4 Big South–OVC)
- Head coach: Gabe Giardina (1st season)
- Offensive coordinator: Adam Hollifield (1st season)
- Defensive coordinator: Nick Reveiz (1st season)
- Home stadium: Buccaneer Field

2023 Big South–OVC football standings
	Conf.			Overall
Team	W		L	W		L
Gardner–Webb +^	5	–	1	7	–	5
No. 25 UT Martin +	5	–	1	8	–	3
Eastern Illinois	4	–	2	8	–	3
Bryant	4	–	2	6	–	5
Southeast Missouri State	3	–	3	4	–	7
Tennessee Tech	2	–	4	4	–	7
Robert Morris	2	–	4	4	–	7
Charleston Southern	2	–	4	4	–	7
Tennessee State	2	–	4	6	–	5
Lindenwood *	1	–	5	3	–	7
+ – Conference co-champions; ^ – FCS playoff participant; Note: Lindenwood ineligible for Big South–OVC title and FCS postseason play due to transition from NCAA Division II.; Rankings from STATS Poll

The 2023 Charleston Southern Buccaneers football team represented Charleston Southern University as a member of the Big South Conference during the 2023 NCAA Division I FCS football season. Led by Gabe Giardina in his first season as head coach, the Buccaneers played home games at Buccaneer Field in Charleston, South Carolina.

== Schedule ==
Date	Time	Opponent	Site	TV	Result	Attendance
August 31	6:00 p.m.	North Greenville*	Buccaneer Field; N. Charleston, SC	ESPN+	W 13–10	4,081
September 9	2:15 p.m.	at No. 25 (FBS) Clemson*	Memorial Stadium; Clemson, SC	ACCN	L 17–66	81,500
September 16	4:00 p.m.	No. 4 William & Mary*	Buccaneer Field; N. Charleston, SC	ESPN+	L 7–15	3,914
September 23	2:30 p.m.	at No. 23 Western Carolina*	Bob Waters Field at E. J. Whitmire Stadium; Cullowhee, NC	ESPN+	L 21–77	13,357
September 30	6:00 p.m.	Kennesaw State*	Buccaneer Field; N. Charleston, SC	ESPN+	W 13–10	3,087
October 14	4:00 p.m.	Lindenwood*^{†}	Buccaneer Field; N. Charleston, SC	ESPN+	W 24–10	3,899
October 21	3:00 p.m.	at No. 17 UT Martin*	Graham Stadium; Martin, TN	ESPN+	L 0–17	5,718
October 28	4:00 p.m.	Bryant	Buccaneer Field; N. Charleston, SC	ESPN+	L 24–47	3,012
November 4	4:00 p.m.	Tennessee State*	Buccaneer Field; N. Charleston, SC	ESPN+	W 35–21	4,109
November 11	12:00 p.m.	at Robert Morris	Joe Walton Stadium; Moon Township, PA	ESPN+	L 12–14	1,638
November 18	1:00 p.m.	at Gardner-Webb	Ernest W. Spangler Stadium; Boiling Springs, NC	ESPN+	L 10–34	5,812
*Non-conference game; ^{†}Homecoming; Rankings from STATS Poll released prior to the game; All times are in Eastern time
