= 2023 UT Martin Skyhawks football team =

American college football season

2023 UT Martin Skyhawks football

Big South–OVC co-champion
- Conference: Big South–OVC football

Ranking
- STATS: No. 25
- FCS Coaches: No. 23
- Record: 8–3 (5–1 Big South–OVC)
- Head coach: Jason Simpson (18th season)
- Offensive coordinator: Kevin Bannon (8th season)
- Defensive coordinator: Brandon Butcher (1st season)
- Home stadium: Graham Stadium

2023 Big South–OVC football standings
	Conf.			Overall
Team	W		L	W		L
Gardner–Webb +^	5	–	1	7	–	5
No. 25 UT Martin +	5	–	1	8	–	3
Eastern Illinois	4	–	2	8	–	3
Bryant	4	–	2	6	–	5
Southeast Missouri State	3	–	3	4	–	7
Tennessee Tech	2	–	4	4	–	7
Robert Morris	2	–	4	4	–	7
Charleston Southern	2	–	4	4	–	7
Tennessee State	2	–	4	6	–	5
Lindenwood *	1	–	5	3	–	7
+ – Conference co-champions; ^ – FCS playoff participant; Note: Lindenwood ineligible for Big South–OVC title and FCS postseason play due to transition from NCAA Division II.; Rankings from STATS Poll

The 2023 UT Martin Skyhawks football team represented the University of Tennessee at Martin as a member of the Big South–OVC Football Association during the 2023 NCAA Division I FCS football season. Led by 18th-year head coach Jason Simpson, the Skyhawks played home games at Graham Stadium in Martin, Tennessee.

== Schedule ==
Date	Time	Opponent	Rank	Site	TV	Result	Attendance
September 2	5:00 p.m.	at No. 1 (FBS) Georgia*		Sanford Stadium; Athens, GA	SECN+/ESPN+	L 7–48	92,746
September 9	6:00 p.m.	Missouri State*		Graham Stadium; Martin, TN	ESPN+	W 38–31	6,104
September 16	6:00 p.m.	Houston Christian*		Graham Stadium; Martin, TN	ESPN+	W 66–7	3,102
September 23	6:00 p.m.	at North Alabama*		Braly Municipal Stadium; Florence, AL	ESPN+	W 37–21	8,836
September 30	6:00 p.m.	Tennessee State	No. 22	Graham Stadium; Martin, TN (Sgt. York Trophy)	ESPN+	W 20–10	5,020
October 7	2:00 p.m.	at Eastern Illinois	No. 18	O'Brien Field; Charleston, IL	ESPN+	W 28–27 ^{OT}	8,078
October 21	2:00 p.m.	Charleston Southern^{†}	No. 17	Graham Stadium; Martin, TN	ESPN+	W 17–0	5,718
October 28	12:30 p.m.	at Gardner–Webb	No. 14	Ernest W. Spangler Stadium; Boiling Springs, NC	ESPN+	L 34–38	5,017
November 4	1:30 p.m.	at Tennessee Tech	No. 21	Tucker Stadium; Cookeville, TN (Sgt. York Trophy)	ESPN+	W 44–41 ^{OT}	10,187
November 11	2:00 p.m.	Southeast Missouri State	No. 21	Graham Stadium; Martin, TN	ESPN+	W 41–14	4,209
November 18	12:00 p.m.	at Samford*	No. 19	Pete Hanna Stadium; Homewood, AL	ESPN+	L 17–27	3,043
*Non-conference game; ^{†}Homecoming; Rankings from STATS Poll released prior to the game; All times are in Central time

== Game summaries ==
=== at No. 1 Georgia (FBS) ===
Game One – UT Martin Skyhawks (0-0) at No. 1 Georgia Bulldogs (FBS) (0-0) – Game summary

Quarter	1	2	3	4	Total
UT Martin	0	0	0	7	7
No. 1 Georgia (FBS)	7	10	14	17	48

at Sanford Stadium • Athens, Georgia

- Date: Saturday, September 2, 2023
- Game time: 6:00 p.m. EST
- Game weather: -
- Game attendance: 92,756
- Referee: Kyle Olson
- TV announcers (SEC Network+): Clay Matvick (play-by-play), Aaron Murray (color) and Ashley ShahAhmadi (sideline)

Game information

First quarter

- (3:40) UGA – Brock Bowers 3-yard run (Peyton Woodring kick) (Drive: 10 plays, 76 yards, 4:39; Georgia 7–0)

Second quarter

- (4:29) UGA – Carson Beck 4-yard run (Peyton Woodring kick) (Drive: 7 plays, 68 yards, 2:43; Georgia 14–0)
- (0:03) UGA – Peyton Woodring 23-yard field goal (Drive: 12 plays, 75 yards, 2:14; Georgia 17–0)

Third quarter

- (8:29) UGA – Mekhi Mews 54-yard pass from Carson Beck (Peyton Woodring kick) (Drive: 6 plays, 98 yards, 2:32; Georgia 24-0)
- (5:35) UGA – Roderick Robinson II 2-yard run (Peyton Woodring kick) (Drive: 5 plays, 80 yards, 1:54; Georgia 31–0)

Fourth quarter

- (11:36) UGA – Oscar Delp 21-yard pass from Brock Vandagriff (Peyton Woodring kick) (Drive: 2 plays, 77 yards, 0:37; Georgia 38–0)
- (6:39) UTM – Trevonte Rucker 9-yard pass from Kinkead Dent (Aidan Laros kick) (Drive: 12 plays, 75 yards, 4:57; Georgia 38–7)
- (2:09) UGA – Peyton Woodring 33-yard field goal (Drive: 10 plays, 60 yards, 4:30; Georgia 41–7)
- (1:59) UGA – Kyron Jones 26-yard interception return (Peyton Woodring kick) (Georgia 48–7)

Statistics	UTM	UGA
First downs	15	28
Total yards	62–262	69–559
Rushing yards	29–134	30–159
Passing yards	128	400
Passing: Comp–Att–Int	18–33–1	26–39–0
Time of possession	29:35	30:25

Team	Category	Player	Statistics
UT Martin	Passing	Kinkead Dent	18/32, 128 yards, TD
UT Martin	Rushing	Kinkead Dent	6 carries, 47 yards
UT Martin	Receiving	Asa Wondeh	4 receptions, 42 yards
Georgia	Passing	Carson Beck	21/31, 294 yards, TD
Georgia	Rushing	Kendall Milton	9 carries, 53 yards
Georgia	Receiving	Brock Bowers	5 receptions, 78 yards
