= 2023 Robert Morris Colonials football team =

American college football season

2023 Robert Morris Colonials football
- Conference: Big South–OVC Football Association
- Record: 4–7 (2–4 Big South–OVC)
- Head coach: Bernard Clark (6th season)
- Offensive coordinator: Josh Firm (1st season)
- Defensive coordinator: Dave Plungas (6th season)
- Home stadium: Joe Walton Stadium

2023 Big South–OVC football standings
	Conf.			Overall
Team	W		L	W		L
Gardner–Webb +^	5	–	1	7	–	5
No. 25 UT Martin +	5	–	1	8	–	3
Eastern Illinois	4	–	2	8	–	3
Bryant	4	–	2	6	–	5
Southeast Missouri State	3	–	3	4	–	7
Tennessee Tech	2	–	4	4	–	7
Robert Morris	2	–	4	4	–	7
Charleston Southern	2	–	4	4	–	7
Tennessee State	2	–	4	6	–	5
Lindenwood *	1	–	5	3	–	7
+ – Conference co-champions; ^ – FCS playoff participant; Note: Lindenwood ineligible for Big South–OVC title and FCS postseason play due to transition from NCAA Division II.; Rankings from STATS Poll

The 2023 Robert Morris Colonials football team represented the Robert Morris University during the 2023 NCAA Division I FCS football season. Led by sixth-year head coach Bernard Clark, the Colonials played their home games at the Joe Walton Stadium in Moon Township, Pennsylvania.

== Schedule ==
Date	Time	Opponent	Site	TV	Result	Attendance
September 2	1:00 p.m.	at Air Force*	Falcon Stadium; Colorado Springs, CO		L 7–42	30,142
September 9	6:00 p.m.	Saint Francis (PA)*	Joe Walton Stadium; Moon Township, PA	ESPN+	W 31–21	3,412
September 16	2:00 p.m.	at No. 25 Youngstown State*	Stambaugh Stadium; Youngstown, OH	ESPN+	L 28–48	12,826
September 23	3:00 p.m.	Virginia–Lynchburg*^{†}	Joe Walton Stadium; Moon Township, PA	ESPN+	W 46–0	2,351
September 30	12:00 p.m.	Howard*	Joe Walton Stadium; Moon Township, PA	ESPN+	L 10–35	2,207
October 7	6:00 p.m.	at Gardner–Webb	Ernest W. Spangler Stadium; Boiling Springs, NC	ESPN+	L 16–31	3,891
October 14	4:00 p.m.	at Bryant	Beirne Stadium; Smithfield, RI	ESPN+	L 24–43	2,286
October 28	12:00 p.m.	Tennessee Tech	Joe Walton Stadium; Moon Township, PA	ESPN+	L 13–38	1,727
November 4	2:00 p.m.	at Southeast Missouri State	Houck Stadium; Cape Girardeau, MO	ESPN+	W 21–20	N/A
November 11	12:00 p.m.	Charleston Southern	Joe Walton Stadium; Moon Township, PA	ESPN+	W 14–12	1,638
November 18	12:00 p.m.	Eastern Illinois	Joe Walton Stadium; Moon Township, PA	ESPN+	L 14–28	2,118
*Non-conference game; ^{†}Homecoming; Rankings from STATS Poll released prior to the game; All times are in Eastern time

== Game summaries ==
=== at Air Force ===
Air Force Falcons (0–0) vs. Robert Morris Colonials (0–0)

Quarter	1	2	3	4	Total
Colonials	0	0	0	7	7
Falcons	14	14	7	7	42

at Falcon Stadium, Colorado Springs, CO

- Date: September 2, 2023
- Game time: 1:00 p.m. MDT
- Game weather: Sunny
- Game attendance: 30,142
- Referee: Nolan Dumas
- TV announcers (Altitude): Vic Lombardi, Ted Sundquist, Katy Winge
- ESPN – Zac Larrier rushes for two touchdowns, passes for another in Air Force's 42-7 win in season opener /// Goairforcefalcons.com – Robert Morris (0-1, 0-0) -VS- Air Force (1-0, 0-0)

Game information

First quarter

- (11:22) AF TD – Cade Harris 3-yard rush, Matthew Dapore kick
  Drive: 5 plays, 26 yards, 2:14; Air Force 7–0
- (03:27) AF TD – Zac Larrier 26-yard rush, Matthew Dapore kick
  Drive: 9 plays, 85 yards, 5:05; Air Force 14–0

Second quarter

- (12:31) AF TD – Zac Larrier 84-yard pass to Jared Roznos, Matthew Dapore kick
  Drive: 2 plays, 80 yards, 0:51; Air Force 21–0
- (01:58) AF TD – Owen Burk 27-yard rush, Matthew Dapore kick
  Drive: 11 plays, 88 yards, 5:46; Air Force 28–0

Third quarter

- (13:53) AF TD – Zac Larrier 4-yard rush, Matthew Dapore kick
  Drive: 3 plays, 75 yards, 1:07; Air Force 35–0

Fourth quarter

- (13:33) AF TD – Jensen Jones 7-yard rush, Reagan Tubbs kick
  Drive: 6 plays, 56 yards, 2:47; Air Force 42–0
- (10:35) RMU TD – Anthony Chiccitt 1-yard pass to Chaese Jackson, Jayson Jenkins kick
  Drive: 6 plays, 56 yards, 2:47; Air Force 42–7

Passing

- RMU – Anthony Chiccitt: 14/18, 99, 1 TD
- AF – Zac Larrier: 2/3, 95 yards, 1 TD

Rushing

- RMU – Kimon O'Sullivan: 9 carries, 39 yards
- AF – Zac Larrier: 14 carries, 99 yards, 2 TD

Receiving

- RMU – Noah Robinson: 3 receptions, 36 yards
- AF – Jared Roznos: 1 reception, 84 yards, 1 TD

Defense

- RMU – Jamar Shegog: 12 total tackles (7 solo, 5 assisted)
- AF – Johnathan Youngblood: 7 total tackles (3 solo, 4 assisted)

Statistics	RMU	AF
First downs	9	24
3rd down efficiency	3–11	6–10
4th down efficiency	0–1	1–3
Plays–yards	50–156	59–469
Rushes–yards	26–43	56–374
Passing yards	113	95
Passing: Comp–Att–Int	18–24–0	2–3–0
Penalties–yards	9–61	2–10
Turnovers	2	1
Time of possession	27:49	32:11
