= 2023 Gardner–Webb Runnin' Bulldogs football team =

American college football season

2023 Gardner–Webb Runnin' Bulldogs football
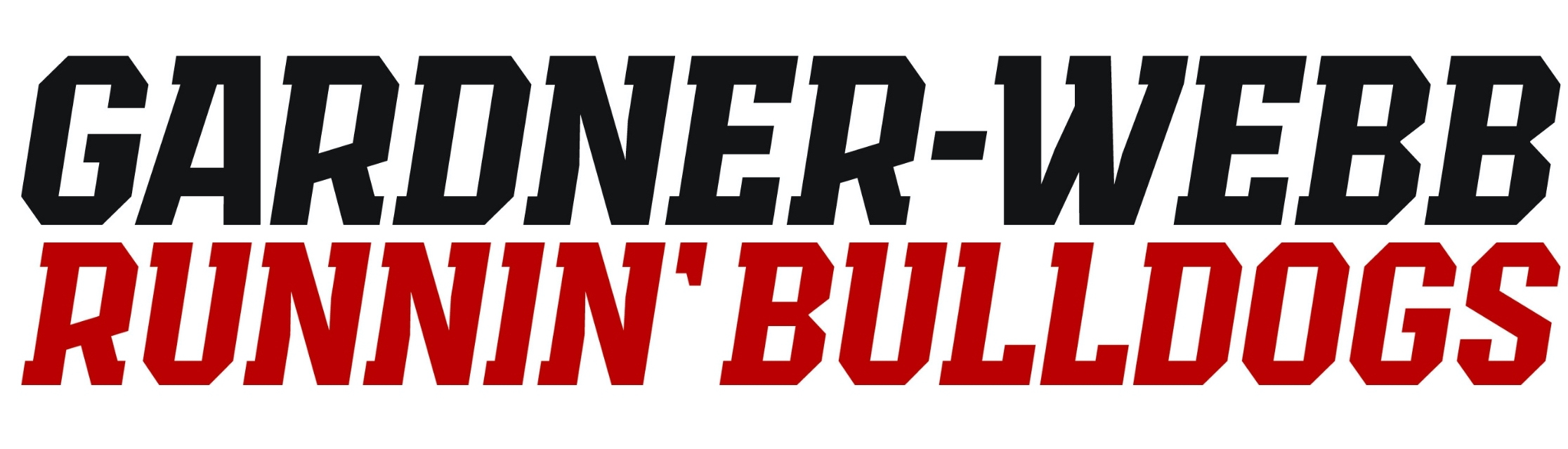

Big South–OVC co-champion

NCAA Division I First Round, L 7–17 at Mercer
- Conference: Big South–OVC football
- Record: 7–5 (5–1 Big South–OVC)
- Head coach: Tre Lamb (4th season)
- Defensive coordinator: Josh Reardon (4th season)
- Home stadium: Ernest W. Spangler Stadium

2023 Big South–OVC football standings
	Conf.			Overall
Team	W		L	W		L
Gardner–Webb +^	5	–	1	7	–	5
No. 25 UT Martin +	5	–	1	8	–	3
Eastern Illinois	4	–	2	8	–	3
Bryant	4	–	2	6	–	5
Southeast Missouri State	3	–	3	4	–	7
Tennessee Tech	2	–	4	4	–	7
Robert Morris	2	–	4	4	–	7
Charleston Southern	2	–	4	4	–	7
Tennessee State	2	–	4	6	–	5
Lindenwood *	1	–	5	3	–	7
+ – Conference co-champions; ^ – FCS playoff participant; Note: Lindenwood ineligible for Big South–OVC title and FCS postseason play due to transition from NCAA Division II.; Rankings from STATS Poll

The 2023 Gardner–Webb Runnin' Bulldogs football team represented Gardner–Webb University as a member of the Big South–OVC Football Association during the 2023 NCAA Division I FCS football season. Led by fourth-year head coach Tre Lamb, the Runnin' Bulldogs played their home games at the Ernest W. Spangler Stadium in Boiling Springs, North Carolina.

== Schedule ==
Date	Time	Opponent	Rank	Site	TV	Result	Attendance
September 2	3:30 p.m.	at Appalachian State*	No. 25	Kidd Brewer Stadium; Boone, NC	ESPN+	L 24–45	36,075
September 9	6:00 p.m.	Elon*		Ernest W. Spangler Stadium; Boiling Springs, NC	ESPN+	W 34–27	5,078
September 16	6:00 p.m.	at Tennessee State		Hale Stadium; Nashville, TN	ESPN+	L 25–27	3,869
September 23	6:00 p.m.	at East Carolina*		Dowdy-Ficklen Stadium; Greenville, NC	ESPN+	L 0–44	40,589
October 7	6:00 p.m.	Robert Morris		Ernest W. Spangler Stadium; Boiling Springs, NC	ESPN+	W 31–16	3,891
October 14	2:00 p.m.	at Austin Peay*		Fortera Stadium; Clarksville, TN	ESPN+	L 14–41	7,503
October 21	6:00 p.m.	Eastern Kentucky*		Ernest W. Spangler Stadium; Boiling Springs, NC	ESPN+	W 35–32	4,339
October 28	1:30 p.m.	No. 14 UT Martin^{†}		Ernest W. Spangler Stadium; Boiling Springs, NC	ESPN+	W 38–34	5,017
November 4	1:00 p.m.	at Bryant		Beirne Stadium; Smithfield, RI	ESPN+	W 45–44 ^{OT}	3,357
November 11	2:30 p.m.	at Tennessee Tech		Tucker Stadium; Cookeville, TN	ESPN+	W 35–0	5,740
November 18	1:00 p.m.	Charleston Southern		Ernest W. Spangler Stadium; Boiling Springs, NC	ESPN+	W 34–10	5,812
November 25	3:00 p.m.	at No. 17 Mercer*		Five Star Stadium; Macon, GA (NCAA Division I First Round)	ESPN+	L 7–17	4,500
*Non-conference game; ^{†}Homecoming; Rankings from STATS Poll released prior to the game; All times are in Eastern time

== Game summaries ==
=== At Appalachian State ===
	1	2	3	4	Total
No. 25 Runnin' Bulldogs	0	10	14	0	24
Mountaineers	7	7	17	14	45

=== Elon ===
	1	2	3	4	Total
Phoenix	3	0	7	17	27
Runnin' Bulldogs	3	10	7	14	34

=== At Tennessee State ===
	1	2	3	4	Total
Runnin' Bulldogs	7	10	2	6	25
Tigers	7	7	7	6	27

=== At East Carolina ===
Gardner–Webb Runnin' Bulldogs (FCS) (1-2) vs East Carolina Pirates (0-3) – Game summary

Quarter	1	2	3	4	Total
Runnin' Bulldogs (FCS)	0	0	0	0	0
Pirates	13	10	7	14	44

at Dowdy-Ficklen Stadium • Greenville, North Carolina

- Date: September 23rd
- Game time: 6:00 p.m. EST
- Game weather: Rain • Temperature: 63 °F (17 °C) • Wind: W at 15 miles per hour (24 km/h)
- Game attendance: 40,589
- Referee: Darryl DeBerry
- TV announcers (ESPN+): James Westling (play-by-play), Reginald Walker Jr. (analyst)

Game information

First quarter

- (9:18) ECU – Rahjai Harris 11 yard pass from Alex Flinn, kick failed (Drive: 6 plays, 72 yards, 2:37; East Carolina 6–0)
- (2:28) ECU – Rahjai Harris 2 yard run, Andrew Conrad kick (Drive: 10 plays, 45 yards, 5:06; East Carolina 13–0)

Second quarter

- (14:46) ECU – Andrew Conrad 44 yard field goal (Drive: 4 plays, -8 yards, 0:58; East Carolina 16–0)
- (13:03) ECU – Mason Garcia 2 yard run, Andrew Conrad kick (Drive: 4 plays, 14 yards, 1:39; East Carolina 23–0)

Third quarter

- (1:55) ECU – Kamarro Edmonds 11 yard run, Andrew Conrad kick (Drive: 8 plays, 66 yards, 3:39; East Carolina 30–0)

Fourth quarter

- (7:39) ECU – Javious Bond 5 yard run, Andrew Conrad kick (Drive: 11 plays, 61 yards, 5:10; East Carolina 37–0)
- (3:05) ECU – Kamarro Edmonds 1 yard run, Andrew Conrad kick (Drive: 2 plays, 9 yards, 0:36; East Carolina 44–0)

Statistics	Gardner-Webb (FCS)	East Carolina
First downs	11	23
Plays–yards	61–107	76–366
Rushes–yards	40–77	43–182
Passing yards	30	184
Passing: comp–att–int	8–21–0	18–32–0
Time of possession	27:16	32:44

Team	Category	Player	Statistics
Gardner-Webb (FCS)	Passing	Matthew Caldwell	7/17, 30 yards
Gardner-Webb (FCS)	Rushing	Narii Gaither	12 carries, 45 yards
Gardner-Webb (FCS)	Receiving	Narii Gaither; Maleek Huggins; Karim Page	2 receptions, 9 yards
East Carolina	Passing	Alex Flinn	8/18, 94 yards, 1 TD
East Carolina	Rushing	Javious Bond	9 carries, 65 yards, 1 TD
East Carolina	Receiving	Jaylen Johnson	6 receptions, 70 yards

=== Robert Morris ===
	1	2	3	4	Total
Colonials	0	3	7	6	16
Runnin' Bulldogs	21	7	0	3	31

=== At Austin Peay ===
	1	2	3	4	Total
Runnin' Bulldogs	7	0	7	0	14
Governors	7	6	14	14	41

=== Eastern Kentucky ===
	1	2	3	4	Total
Colonels					0
Runnin' Bulldogs					0

=== No. 14 UT Martin ===
	1	2	3	4	Total
No. 14 Skyhawks					0
Runnin' Bulldogs					0

=== At Bryant ===
	1	2	3	4	Total
Runnin' Bulldogs					0
Bulldogs					0

=== At Tennessee Tech ===
	1	2	3	4	Total
Runnin' Bulldogs					0
Golden Eagles					0

=== Charleston Southern ===
	1	2	3	4	Total
Buccaneers					0
Runnin' Bulldogs					0
