= 2023 Lindenwood Lions football team =

American college football season

2023 Lindenwood Lions football
- Conference: Big South–OVC football
- Record: 3–7 (1–5 Big South–OVC)
- Head coach: Jed Stugart (6th season)
- Offensive coordinator: Dusty Hovorka (6th season)
- Defensive coordinator: Eric Inama (6th season)
- Home stadium: Harlen C. Hunter Stadium

2023 Big South–OVC football standings
| | Conf. | | | Overall |
| Team | W | | L | W | | L |
|---|---|---|---|---|---|---|
| Gardner–Webb +^ | 5 | – | 1 | 7 | – | 5 |
| No. 25 UT Martin + | 5 | – | 1 | 8 | – | 3 |
| Eastern Illinois | 4 | – | 2 | 8 | – | 3 |
| Bryant | 4 | – | 2 | 6 | – | 5 |
| Southeast Missouri State | 3 | – | 3 | 4 | – | 7 |
| Tennessee Tech | 2 | – | 4 | 4 | – | 7 |
| Robert Morris | 2 | – | 4 | 4 | – | 7 |
| Charleston Southern | 2 | – | 4 | 4 | – | 7 |
| Tennessee State | 2 | – | 4 | 6 | – | 5 |
| Lindenwood * | 1 | – | 5 | 3 | – | 7 |
+ – Conference co-champions; ^ – FCS playoff participant; Note: Lindenwood ineligible for Big South–OVC title and FCS postseason play due to transition from NCAA Division II.; Rankings from STATS Poll

The 2023 Lindenwood football team represented Lindenwood University as a member of the Ohio Valley Conference (OVC) in the 2023 NCAA Division I FCS football season. Led by sixth-year head coach Jed Stugart, the Lions played home games at Harlen C. Hunter Stadium in St. Charles, Missouri.

== Schedule ==
| Date | Time | Opponent | Site | TV | Result | Attendance |
|---|---|---|---|---|---|---|
| August 31 | 7:00 p.m. | Wisconsin–Stevens Point* | Harlen C. Hunter Stadium; St. Charles, MO | ESPN+ | W 77–9 | 3,827 |
| September 9 | 7:00 p.m. | at No. 14 Southeast Missouri State | Houck Stadium; Cape Girardeau, MO | ESPN+ | L 7–45 | 7,044 |
| September 16 | 6:00 p.m. | at Western Illinois* | Hanson Field; Macomb, IL | ESPN+ | W 43–40 | 3,548 |
| September 23 | 12:00 p.m. | at Illinois State* | Hancock Stadium; Normal, IL | ESPN+ | L 17–48 | 13,391 |
| September 30 | 1:00 p.m. | Austin Peay* | Harlen C. Hunter Stadium; St. Charles, MO | ESPN+ | L 10–52 | 2,816 |
| October 7 | 1:00 p.m. | Tennessee Tech | Harlen C. Hunter Stadium; St. Charles, MO | ESPN+ | W 23–0 | 3,622 |
| October 14 | 3:00 p.m. | at Charleston Southern* | Buccaneer Field; N. Charleston, SC | ESPN+ | L 10–24 | 3,899 |
| October 28 | 2:00 p.m. | at Tennessee State | Hale Stadium; Nashville, TN | ESPN+ | L 20–43 | 3,879 |
| November 4 | 2:00 p.m. | Eastern Illinois^{†} | Harlen C. Hunter Stadium; St. Charles, MO | ESPN+ | L 10–16 | 3,788 |
| November 11 | 1:00 p.m. | Bryant* | Harlen C. Hunter Stadium; St. Charles, MO | ESPN+ | L 3–38 | 2,347 |
*Non-conference game; ^{†}Homecoming; Rankings from STATS Poll released prior to the game; All times are in Central time
