= 2023 Tennessee State Tigers football team =

American college football season

2023 Tennessee State Tigers football
- Conference: Big South–OVC Football Association
- Record: 6–5 (2–4 Big South–OVC)
- Head coach: Eddie George (3rd season)
- Offensive coordinator: Theron Aych (2nd season)
- Offensive scheme: Pro-style
- Defensive coordinator: Brandon Fisher (3rd season)
- Base defense: Multiple 3–3–5
- Home stadium: Nissan Stadium

2023 Big South–OVC football standings
	Conf.			Overall
Team	W		L	W		L
Gardner–Webb +^	5	–	1	7	–	5
No. 25 UT Martin +	5	–	1	8	–	3
Eastern Illinois	4	–	2	8	–	3
Bryant	4	–	2	6	–	5
Southeast Missouri State	3	–	3	4	–	7
Tennessee Tech	2	–	4	4	–	7
Robert Morris	2	–	4	4	–	7
Charleston Southern	2	–	4	4	–	7
Tennessee State	2	–	4	6	–	5
Lindenwood *	1	–	5	3	–	7
+ – Conference co-champions; ^ – FCS playoff participant; Note: Lindenwood ineligible for Big South–OVC title and FCS postseason play due to transition from NCAA Division II.; Rankings from STATS Poll

The 2023 Tennessee State Tigers football team represented Tennessee State University as a member of the Big South–OVC Football Association during the 2023 NCAA Division I FCS football season. Led by third-year head coach Eddie George, the Tigers played home games at Nissan Stadium in Nashville, Tennessee.

== Schedule ==
Date	Time	Opponent	Site	TV	Result	Attendance
September 2	2:30 p.m.	at No. 13 (FBS) Notre Dame*	Notre Dame Stadium; Notre Dame, IN	NBC	L 3–56	77,622
September 9	7:00 p.m.	vs. Arkansas–Pine Bluff*	Simmons Bank Liberty Stadium; Memphis, TN (Southern Heritage Classic)	HBCU Go	W 24–14	32,518
September 16	5:00 p.m.	Gardner–Webb	Nissan Stadium; Nashville, TN	ESPN+	W 27–25	3,869
September 30	6:00 p.m.	at No. 22 UT Martin	Graham Stadium; Martin, TN (Sgt. York Trophy)	ESPN+	L 10–20	5,020
October 7	2:00 p.m.	at Kennesaw State*	Fifth Third Bank Stadium; Kennesaw, GA	ESPN+	W 27–20	10,436
October 14	5:00 p.m.	Norfolk State*^{†}	Hale Stadium; Nashville, TN	ESPN+	W 24–17	13,975
October 21	2:00 p.m.	Lincoln (CA)*	Nissan Stadium; Nashville, TN	ESPN+	W 54–0	2,727
October 28	2:00 p.m.	Lindenwood	Nissan Stadium; Nashville, TN	ESPN+	W 43–20	3,879
November 4	3:00 p.m.	at Charleston Southern	Buccaneer Field; N. Charleston, SC	ESPN+	L 21–35	4,109
November 11	12:00 p.m.	at Eastern Illinois	O'Brien Field; Charleston, IL	ESPN+	L 17–30	3,423
November 18	2:00 p.m.	Tennessee Tech	Nissan Stadium; Nashville, TN (Sgt. York Trophy)	ESPN+	L 0–35	2,552
*Non-conference game; ^{†}Homecoming; Rankings from STATS Poll released prior to the game; All times are in Eastern time

== Game summaries ==
=== at Notre Dame ===
Tennessee State Tigers (0–0) vs No. 13 Notre Dame Fighting Irish (1–0) – Game summary

Quarter	1	2	3	4	Total
Tigers	3	0	0	0	3
No. 13 Fighting Irish	7	14	28	7	56

at Notre Dame Stadium • Notre Dame, IN

- Date: September 2, 2023
- Game time: 3:30 p.m.
- Game weather: Sunny, 85 °F (29 °C)
- Game attendance: 77,622
- Referee: Mike Roche
- TV announcers (NBC): Paul Burmeister (play-by-play), Jason Garrett (analyst), Zora Stephenson (sideline)

Game information

First quarter

- (9:17) ND – Jeremiyah Love 36-yard rush, Spencer Shrader kick (Drive: 10 plays, 75 yards, 5:43; Notre Dame 7–0)
- (2:44) TNST – James Lowery 38-yard field goal (Drive: 15 plays, 55 yards, 6:33; Notre Dame 7–3)

Second quarter

- (12:22) ND – Sam Hartman 5-yard rush, Spencer Shrader kick (Drive: 8 plays, 80 yards, 4:16; Notre Dame 14–3)
- (9:41) ND – Chris Tyree 24-yard pass from Sam Hartman, Spencer Shrader kick (Drive: 4 plays, 57 yards, 2:01; Notre Dame 21–3)
- (5:17) ND – Audric Estimé 5-yard rush, Spencer Shrader kick (Drive: 8 plays, 53 yards, 2:55; Notre Dame 28–3)
- (0:15) ND – Holden Staes 4-yard pass from Sam Hartman, Spencer Shrader kick (Drive: 6 plays, 80 yards, 0:38; Notre Dame 35–3)

Third quarter

- (1:06) ND – Jadarian Price 40-yard pass from Steve Angeli, Spencer Shrader kick (Drive: 7 plays, 82 yards, 3:28; Notre Dame 42–3)
- (0:19) ND – Clarence Lewis 33-yard interception return, Spencer Shrader kick (Drive: 0:47; Notre Dame 49–3)

Fourth quarter

- (7:43) ND – Gi'Bran Payne 42-yard pass from Steve Angeli, Zac Yoakam kick (Drive: 7 plays, 87 yards, 3:34; Notre Dame 56–3)

Statistics	TNST	ND
First downs	12	26
Total yards	158	557
Rushes/yards	35–91	33–221
Passing yards	67	336
Passing: Comp–Att–Int	8–22–2	24–30–0
Time of possession	26:16	33:44

Team	Category	Player	Statistics
Tennessee State	Passing	Deveon Bryant	5/12, 43 yards, 2 INT
Tennessee State	Rushing	Deveon Bryant	6 carries, 29 yards
Tennessee State	Receiving	Dashon Davis	1 reception, 22 yards
Notre Dame	Passing	Sam Hartman	14/17, 194 yards, 2 TD
Notre Dame	Rushing	Audric Estimé	13 carries, 116 yards, TD
Notre Dame	Receiving	Jayden Thomas	4 receptions, 62 yards
