= 2023 Eastern Illinois Panthers football team =

American college football season

2023 Eastern Illinois Panthers football
- Conference: Big South–OVC

Ranking
- FCS Coaches: No. 24
- Record: 8–3 (4–2 Big South–OVC)
- Head coach: Chris Wilkerson (2nd season)
- Offensive coordinator: Joe Davis (2nd season)
- Defensive coordinator: Clay Bignell (1st season)
- Home stadium: O'Brien Field

2023 Big South–OVC football standings
	Conf.			Overall
Team	W		L	W		L
Gardner–Webb +^	5	–	1	7	–	5
No. 25 UT Martin +	5	–	1	8	–	3
Eastern Illinois	4	–	2	8	–	3
Bryant	4	–	2	6	–	5
Southeast Missouri State	3	–	3	4	–	7
Tennessee Tech	2	–	4	4	–	7
Robert Morris	2	–	4	4	–	7
Charleston Southern	2	–	4	4	–	7
Tennessee State	2	–	4	6	–	5
Lindenwood *	1	–	5	3	–	7
+ – Conference co-champions; ^ – FCS playoff participant; Note: Lindenwood ineligible for Big South–OVC title and FCS postseason play due to transition from NCAA Division II.; Rankings from STATS Poll

The 2023 Eastern Illinois Panthers football team represented Eastern Illinois University as a member of the Big South–OVC Football Association during the 2023 NCAA Division I FCS football season. Led by second-year head coach Chris Wilkerson, the Panthers played home games at O'Brien Field in Charleston, Illinois.

== Preseason ==
=== Preseason coaches' poll ===
The Big South-OVC released their preseason coaches' poll on July 25, 2023. The Panthers were picked to finish in eighth place.

=== Preseason Watchlist ===
The Panthers had ten players selected to the preseason Big South-OVC watchlist.

== Schedule ==
Date	Time	Opponent	Site	TV	Result	Attendance
August 31	5:00 p.m.	at Indiana State*	Memorial Stadium; Terre Haute, IN	ESPN+	W 27–0	4,355
September 9	1:00 p.m.	at Bowling Green*	Doyt Perry Stadium; Bowling Green, OH	ESPN+	L 15–38	12,312
September 16	2:00 p.m.	Illinois State*	O'Brien Field; Charleston, IL (Mid-America Classic)	ESPN+	W 14–13	6,602
September 23	2:00 p.m.	McNeese*	O'Brien Field; Charleston, IL	ESPN+	W 31–28	6,565
September 30	6:00 p.m.	at Northwestern State*	Harry Turpin Stadium; Natchitoches, LA	ESPN+	W 19–10	6,021
October 7	2:00 p.m.	No. 18 UT Martin^{†}	O'Brien Field; Charleston, IL	ESPN+	L 27–28 ^{OT}	8,078
October 14	2:00 p.m.	at Southeast Missouri State	Houck Stadium; Cape Girardeau, MO	ESPN+	L 28–35	7,263
October 21	2:00 p.m.	Bryant	O'Brien Field; Charleston, IL	ESPN+	W 25–24 ^{OT}	3,690
November 4	2:00 p.m.	at Lindenwood	Harlen C. Hunter Stadium; St. Charles, MO	ESPN+	W 16–10	3,788
November 11	12:00 p.m.	Tennessee State	O'Brien Field; Charleston, IL	ESPN+	W 30–17	3,423
November 18	11:00 a.m.	at Robert Morris	Joe Walton Stadium; Moon Township, PA	ESPN+	W 28–14	2,118
*Non-conference game; ^{†}Homecoming; Rankings from STATS Poll released prior to the game; All times are in Central time

== Game summaries ==
=== at Bowling Green ===
Game Two – Eastern Illinois Panthers (1–0) at Bowling Green Falcons (0–1) – Game summary

Quarter	1	2	3	4	Total
Eastern Illinois	6	6	0	3	15
Bowling Green	7	14	10	7	38

at Doyt Perry Stadium • Bowling Green, OH

- Date: Saturday, September 9, 2023
- Game time: 1:00 p.m. EDT
- Game weather: Sunny, 72 °F (22 °C) • Wind: NE 8 mph (13 km/h)
- Game attendance: 12,312
- Referee: Phil Hicks
- TV announcers (ESPN+): David Wilson and Bob Gennarelli

Game information

First quarter

- (09:43) BGSU – Odieu Hiliare 10-yard pass from Connor Bazelak (Alan Anaya kick) (Drive: 11 plays, 90 yards, 5:11; Bowling Green 7-0)
- (04:57) EIU – Kevin Daniels 15-yard pass from Pierce Holley (William Orth kick failed) (Drive: 10 plays, 65 yards, 4:42; Bowling Green 7-6)

Second quarter

- (12:10) BGSU – Terion Stewart 1-yard run (Alan Anaya kick) (Drive: 6 plays, 50 yards, 3:17; Bowling Green 14-6)
- (07:02) BGSU – Abdul-Fatai Ibrahim 11-yard pass from Connor Bazelak (Alan Anaya kick) (Drive: 8 plays, 56 yards, 3:29; Bowling Green 21-6)
- (01:31) EIU – DeAirious Smith 11-yard pass from Pierce Holley (Holley pass failed) (Drive: 11 plays, 90 yards, 5:24; Bowling Green 21-12)

Third quarter

- (03:23) BGSU – Alan Anaya 27-yard field goal (Drive: 14 plays, 71 yards, 5:18; Bowling Green 24-12)
- (01:07) BGSU – Harold Fannin Jr. 19-yard pass from Connor Bazelak (Alan Anaya kick) (Drive: 3 plays, 74 yards, 1:18; Bowling Green 31-12)

Fourth quarter

- (10:32) EIU – Julian Patino 31-yard field goal (Drive: 11 plays, 57 yards, 5:30; Bowling Green 31-15)
- (08:35) BGSU – Terion Stewart 1-yard run (Alan Anaya kick) (Drive: 5 plays, 75 yards, 1:57; Bowling Green 38-15)

Statistics	Eastern Illinois	Bowling Green
First downs	20	25
Plays–yards	59-325	64-509
Rushes–yards	26–75	34–141
Passing yards	250	368
Passing: comp–att–int	21–33–1	25-30-0
Time of possession	29:48	30:12

Team	Category	Player	Statistics
Eastern Illinois	Passing	Pierce Holley	21/32, 250 yards, 2 TDS, 1 INT
Eastern Illinois	Rushing	Kevin Daniels	15 carries, 78 yards
Eastern Illinois	Receiving	DeAirious Smith	4 receptions, 83 yards, TD
Bowling Green	Passing	Connor Bazelak	23/28, 319 yards, 3 TDS
Bowling Green	Rushing	Terion Stewart	10 carries, 51 yards, 2 TDS
Bowling Green	Receiving	Ta'ron Keith	6 receptions, 123 yards

=== at Northwestern State ===
Eastern Illinois Panthers at Northwestern State Demons – Game summary

Quarter	1	2	3	4	Total
Panthers	3	7	6	3	19
Demons	3	7	0	0	10

at Harry Turpin Stadium, Natchitoches, Louisiana

- Date: September 30
- Game time: 6:00 p.m. CDT
- Game weather: Sunny, 91 °F (33 °C)
- Game attendance: 6,021
- Referee: Gary Leeper
- TV announcers (ESPN+): Killian McClatchley, Jake DeLongchamps, and Justin Biegel

Game information
First quarter
- NWST – Brett Money 23-yard field goal, 6:43. Demons 3–0. Drive: 12 plays, 50 yards, 4:26.
- EIU – Julian Patino 23-yard field goal, 0:05. Tied 3–3. Drive: 8 plays, 26 yards, 3:02.

Second quarter

- EIU – Justin Bowick 52-yard pass from Pierce Holley (Julian Patino kick), 10:28. Panthers 10–3. Drive: 2 plays, 67 yards, 0:40.
- NWST – Chance Newman 1-yard run (Brett Money kick), 2:28. Tied 10–10. Drive: 7 plays, 90 yards, 3:08.

Third quarter

- EIU – Kevin Daniels 6-yard run (kick failed), 11:54. Panthers 16–10. Drive: 7 plays, 71 yards, 3:04.

Fourth quarter

- EIU – Stone Galloway 22-yard field goal, 8:03. Panthers 19–10. Drive: 7 plays, 19 yards, 2:52.

Statistics	EIU	NWST
First downs	18	19
Total yards	349	350
Rushing yards	75	69
Passing yards	274	281
Turnovers	1	3
Time of possession	28:25	31:35

Team	Category	Player	Statistics
Eastern Illinois	Passing	Pierce Holley	19/37, 274 yards, TD
Eastern Illinois	Rushing	M. J. Flowers	15 rushes, 48 yards
Eastern Illinois	Receiving	Justin Bowick	4 receptions, 130 yards, TD
Northwestern State	Passing	Quaterius Hawkins	27/44, 281 yards, INT
Northwestern State	Rushing	Scooter Adams	9 rushes, 29 yards
Northwestern State	Receiving	Zach Patterson	7 receptions, 74 yards
