= 2023 Bryant Bulldogs football team =

American college football season

2023 Bryant Bulldogs football
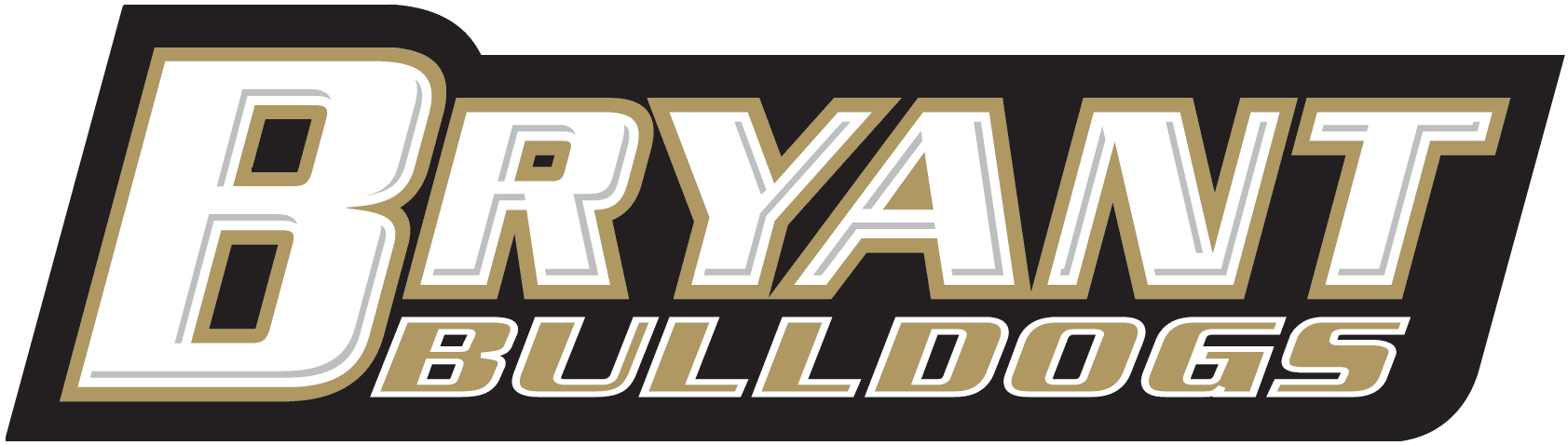
- Conference: Big South–OVC Football Association
- Record: 6–5 (4–2 Big South–OVC)
- Head coach: Chris Merritt (5th season)
- Defensive coordinator: Anthony Barese (4th season)
- Home stadium: Beirne Stadium

2023 Big South–OVC football standings
	Conf.			Overall
Team	W		L	W		L
Gardner–Webb +^	5	–	1	7	–	5
No. 25 UT Martin +	5	–	1	8	–	3
Eastern Illinois	4	–	2	8	–	3
Bryant	4	–	2	6	–	5
Southeast Missouri State	3	–	3	4	–	7
Tennessee Tech	2	–	4	4	–	7
Robert Morris	2	–	4	4	–	7
Charleston Southern	2	–	4	4	–	7
Tennessee State	2	–	4	6	–	5
Lindenwood *	1	–	5	3	–	7
+ – Conference co-champions; ^ – FCS playoff participant; Note: Lindenwood ineligible for Big South–OVC title and FCS postseason play due to transition from NCAA Division II.; Rankings from STATS Poll

The 2023 Bryant Bulldogs football team represented Bryant University as a member of the Big South–OVC Football Association during the 2023 NCAA Division I FCS football season. Led by fifth-year head coach Chris Merritt, the Bulldogs compiled an overall record of 6–5 with a mark of 4–2 in conference play, tying for third place in the Big South–OVC. The Bulldogs played games at Beirne Stadium in Smithfield, Rhode Island.

== Schedule ==
Date	Time	Opponent	Site	TV	Result	Attendance
September 2	4:00 p.m.	at UNLV*	Allegiant Stadium; Las Vegas, NV		L 14–44	20,347
September 9	6:00 p.m.	LIU*	Beirne Stadium; Smithfield, RI	ESPN+	W 21–10	772
September 16	4:00 p.m.	Brown*	Beirne Stadium; Smithfield, RI	ESPN+	L 25–29	1443
September 23	3:00 p.m.	at Princeton*	Powers Field at Princeton Stadium; Princeton, NJ	ESPN+	W 16–13 ^{OT}	4,004
September 30	1:00 p.m.	at No. 24 Rhode Island*	Meade Stadium; Kingston, RI	FloSports	L 26–49	5,676
October 14	4:00 p.m.	Robert Morris^{†}	Beirne Stadium; Smithfield, RI	ESPN+	W 43–24	2,286
October 21	3:00 p.m.	at Eastern Illinois	O'Brien Field; Charleston, IL	ESPN+	L 24–25 ^{OT}	3,690
October 28	4:00 p.m.	at Charleston Southern	Buccaneer Field; Charleston, SC	ESPN+	W 47–24	3,012
November 4	1:00 p.m.	Gardner–Webb	Beirne Stadium; Smithfield, RI	ESPN+	L 44–45 ^{OT}	3,357
November 11	2:00 p.m.	at Lindenwood	Harlen C. Hunter Stadium; St. Charles, MO	ESPN+	W 38–3	2,347
November 18	1:00 p.m.	Southeast Missouri State	Beirne Stadium; Smithfield, RI	ESPN+	W 45–21	768
*Non-conference game; ^{†}Homecoming; Rankings from STATS Poll released prior to the game; All times are in Eastern time

== Game summaries ==
=== at UNLV ===
Bryant Bulldogs (0–0) vs UNLV Rebels (0–0) – Game summary

Quarter	1	2	3	4	Total
Bulldogs	0	0	7	7	14
Rebels	17	7	17	3	44

at Allegiant Stadium • Paradise, NV

- Date: September 2, 2023
- Game time: 4:00 p.m. EST
- Game weather: None (Indoor stadium)
- Game attendance: 20,347
- Referee: Kenneth Ray
- TV announcers (KVVU): Steve Cofield, Matt Neverett

Game information

First quarter

- (14:16) UNLV – Vincent Davis 69-yard run, Jose Pizano kick (Drive: 1 play, 69 yards, 0:38; UNLV 7–0)
- (8:49) UNLV – Jai'Den Thomas 18-yard run, Jose Pizano kick (Drive: 7 plays, 41 yards, 2:38; UNLV 14–0)
- (1:06) UNLV – Jose Pizano 48-yard field goal (Drive: 8 plays, 34 yards, 2:16; UNLV 17–0)

Second quarter

- (0:00) UNLV – Doug Brumfield 19-yard run, Jose Pizano kick (Drive: 6 plays, 37 yards, 1:22; UNLV 24–0)

Third quarter

- (7:30) UNLV – Jose Pizano 37-yard field goal (Drive: 7 plays, 35 yards, 2:34; UNLV 27–0)
- (3:52) BRY – Ryan Clark 1-yard run, Ethan Gettman kick (Drive: 8 plays, 75 yards, 3:38; UNLV 27–7)
- (3:26) UNLV – Donavyn Lester 2-yard run, Jose Pizano kick (Drive: 1 play, 2 yards, 0:03; UNLV 34–7)
- (0:08) UNLV – Jai'Den Thomas 8-yard run, Jose Pizano kick (Drive: 6 plays, 54 yards, 1:44; UNLV 41–7)

Fourth quarter

- (12:40) BRY – Ryan Clark 1-yard run, Ethan Gettman kick (Drive: 5 plays, 75 yards, 4:33; UNLV 41–14)
- (6:39) UNLV – Jose Pizano 35-yard field goal (Drive: 14 plays, 60 yards, 5:43; UNLV 44–14)

Statistics	BRY	UNLV
First downs	19	20
Total yards	409	394
Rushing yards	40–179	40–268
Passing yards	230	126
Passing: Comp–Att–Int	19–31–1	15–24–1
Time of possession	39:04	20:56

Team	Category	Player	Statistics
Bryant	Passing	Zevi Eckhaus	19/29, 230 yards, INT
Bryant	Rushing	Zevi Eckhaus	9 carries, 89 yards
Bryant	Receiving	Landon Ruggieri	11 receptions, 109 yards
UNLV	Passing	Doug Brumfield	11/18, 86 yards, INT
UNLV	Rushing	Vincent Davis	3 carries, 79 yards, TD
UNLV	Receiving	Jacob De Jesus	4 receptions, 50 yards

=== Brown ===
	1	2	3	4	Total
Bears	7	9	0	13	29
Bulldogs	0	10	7	8	25

Statistics	BRWN	BRY
First downs	27	23
Total yards	428	435
Rushing yards	73	173
Passing yards	355	262
Turnovers	0	4
Time of possession	34:57	25:03

Team	Category	Player	Statistics
Brown	Passing	Jake Wilcox	36/49, 355 yards, 3 TD
Brown	Rushing	Stockton Owen	14 rushes, 54 yards, TD
Brown	Receiving	Wes Rockett	8 receptions, 121 yards, 2 TD
Bryant	Passing	Zevi Eckhaus	20/37, 262 yards, 2 TD, 2 INT
Bryant	Rushing	Fabrice Mukendi	14 rushes, 109 yards
Bryant	Receiving	Matthew Prochaska	6 receptions, 112 yards, TD
