= 2023 Southeast Missouri State Redhawks football team =

American college football season

2023 Southeast Missouri State Redhawks football
- Conference: Big South–OVC football
- Record: 4–7 (3–3 Big South–OVC)
- Head coach: Tom Matukewicz (10th season)
- Offensive coordinator: Jeromy McDowell (6th season)
- Defensive coordinator: Ricky Coon (2nd season)
- Home stadium: Houck Stadium

2023 Big South–OVC football standings
	Conf.			Overall
Team	W		L	W		L
Gardner–Webb +^	5	–	1	7	–	5
No. 25 UT Martin +	5	–	1	8	–	3
Eastern Illinois	4	–	2	8	–	3
Bryant	4	–	2	6	–	5
Southeast Missouri State	3	–	3	4	–	7
Tennessee Tech	2	–	4	4	–	7
Robert Morris	2	–	4	4	–	7
Charleston Southern	2	–	4	4	–	7
Tennessee State	2	–	4	6	–	5
Lindenwood *	1	–	5	3	–	7
+ – Conference co-champions; ^ – FCS playoff participant; Note: Lindenwood ineligible for Big South–OVC title and FCS postseason play due to transition from NCAA Division II.; Rankings from STATS Poll

The 2023 Southeast Missouri State Redhawks football team represented Southeast Missouri State University (SEMO) as a member of the Big South–OVC Football Association during the 2023 NCAA Division I FCS football season. Led by tenth-year head coach Tom Matukewicz, the Redhawks played home games at Houck Stadium in Cape Girardeau, Missouri.

== Schedule ==
Date	Time	Opponent	Rank	Site	TV	Result	Attendance
September 2	6:00 p.m.	at No. 16 (FBS) Kansas State*	No. 12	Bill Snyder Family Football Stadium; Manhattan, KS	ESPN+	L 0–45	52,066
September 9	6:00 p.m.	Lindenwood	No. 14	Houck Stadium; Cape Girardeau, MO	ESPN+	W 45–7	7,044
September 16	6:00 p.m.	No. 15 Southern Illinois*	No. 13	Houck Stadium; Cape Girardeau, MO	ESPN+	L 25–26	8,613
September 23	5:00 p.m.	at Eastern Kentucky*	No. 16	Roy Kidd Stadium; Richmond, KY	ESPN+	L 38–41	13,477
October 7	4:00 p.m.	at No. 23 Central Arkansas*		Estes Stadium; Conway, AR	ESPN+	L 33–38	9,457
October 14	2:00 p.m.	Eastern Illinois^{†}		Houck Stadium; Cape Girardeau, MO	ESPN+	W 35–28	7,263
October 21	1:30 p.m.	at Tennessee Tech		Tucker Stadium; Cookeville, TN	ESPN+	W 28–3	6,577
October 28	2:00 p.m.	at Nicholls*		Manning Field at John L. Guidry Stadium; Thibodaux, LA	ESPN+	W 35–31	5,033
November 4	1:00 p.m.	Robert Morris		Houck Stadium; Cape Girardeau, MO	ESPN+	L 20–21	N/A
November 11	2:00 p.m.	at No. 21 UT Martin		Graham Stadium; Martin, TN	ESPN+	L 14–41	4,209
November 18	12:00 p.m.	at Bryant		Beirne Stadium; Smithfield, RI	ESPN+	L 21–45	768
*Non-conference game; ^{†}Homecoming; Rankings from STATS Poll released prior to the game; All times are in Central time

== Game summaries ==
=== at Kansas State ===
Game One – No. 12 (FCS) Southeast Missouri State at No. 16 Kansas State Wildcats

Quarter	1	2	3	4	Total
No. 12 (FCS) Redhawks	0	0	0	0	0
No. 16 Wildcats	7	28	3	7	45

at Bill Snyder Family Stadium • Manhattan, Kansas

- Date: Saturday, September 2, 2023
- Game time: 6:00 p.m. CDT
- Game weather: • Temperature: 100 degrees, sunny, wind S at 9 mph
- Game attendance: 52,066
- Referee: Henry Johnson
- TV announcers (ESPN+): Mark Neely (Play-by-Play), Adam Breneman (Analyst), and Tori Petry (Sideline)

Statistics	Southeast Missouri State	Kansas State
First downs	13	28
Total yards	227	588
Rushes/yards	26/6	40/228
Passing yards	221	360
Passing: Comp–Att–Int	25–37–0	22–31–1
Turnovers	0	1
Time of possession	30:35	29:25
Penalties–yards	5−65	4−36

Team	Category	Player	Statistics
Southeast Missouri State	Passing	Paxton DeLaurent	24/36, 213 YDS
Southeast Missouri State	Rushing	Darrell Smith	6 CAR, 18 YDS, 11 Long
Southeast Missouri State	Receiving	Ryan Flournoy	10 REC, 96 YDS, 24 Long
Kansas State	Passing	Will Howard	18/26, 297 YDS, 2 TDS, 1 INT
Kansas State	Rushing	DJ Giddens	15 CAR, 128 YDS, 43 Long
Kansas State	Receiving	RJ Garcia II	5 REC, 119 YDS, 1 TD, 44 Long

Scoring summary

Quarter	Time	Drive			Team	Scoring information	Score	
Quarter	Time	Plays	Yards	TOP	Team	Scoring information	SEMO	KSU
1st	9:33	9	67	4:03	KSU	Jadon Jackson 33-yard touchdown reception from Will Howard, Chris Tennant kick good	0	7
2nd	11:57	13	84	5:45	KSU	Will Howard 1-yard touchdown run, Chris Tennant kick good	0	14
2nd	8:13	6	87	2:16	KSU	RJ Garcia II 37-yard touchdown reception from Will Howard, Chris Tennant kick good	0	21
2nd	5:35	4	60	1:42	KSU	Treshaun Ward 3-yard touchdown run, Chris Tennant kick good	0	28
2nd	0:38	9	89	1:36	KSU	Will Howard 8-yard touchdown reception from Treshaun Ward, Chris Tennant kick good	0	35
3rd	12:17	7	34	2:37	KSU	51-yard field goal by Chris Tennant	0	38
4th	14:30	8	79	3:42	KSU	Avery Johnson 7-yard touchdown run, Leyton Simmering kick good	0	45
"TOP" = time of possession. For other American football terms, see Glossary of American football.							SEMO 0	KSU 45

=== at Nicholls ===
Southeast Missouri State Redhawks at Nicholls Colonels

Quarter	1	2	3	4	Total
Redhawks	3	10	22	0	35
Colonels	7	14	7	3	31

at Manning Field at John L. Guidry Stadium, Thibodaux, LA

- Date: October 28, 2023
- Game time: 2:00 p.m. CST
- Game weather: Sunny
- Game attendance: 5,033
- Referee: Craig Hesler
- TV announcers (ESPN+): Jack Benjamin and Wayde Keiser

Game information

First Quarter
Second Quarter
Third Quarter
Fourth Quarter

Win Probability

Line

Over/Under

Statistics	SEMO	NICH
First downs	19	23
Total yards	66-349	81-406
Rushing yards	43-210	27-61
Passing yards	139	345
Turnovers	0	2
Time of possession	30:34	29:26

Team	Category	Player	Statistics
Southeast Missouri State	Passing	Patrick Heitert	12/23-0; total 139 yds; long 26 yds; TD 1; sacks 5
Southeast Missouri State	Rushing	Geno Hess	18 attempts; gain 136 yds; loss 8 yds; long 64 yds; TD 1
Southeast Missouri State	Receiving	Ryan Flournoy	4 receptions; total 62 yds; long 29 yds; TD 1
Nicholls	Passing	Pat McQuaide	26/53-1; total 345 yds; long 88 yds; TD 1; INT 1; sacks 1
Nicholls	Rushing	Collin Guggenheim	16 attempts; gain 70 yds; loss 2 yds; long 12 yds; TD 1
Nicholls	Receiving	Jaylon Spears	5 attempts; gain 116; long 88 yds; TD 1
