= 2023 Tennessee Tech Golden Eagles football team =

American college football season

2023 Tennessee Tech Golden Eagles football
- Conference: Big South–OVC football
- Record: 4–7 (2–4 Big South–OVC)
- Head coach: Dewayne Alexander (6th season)
- Offensive coordinator: Wesley Satterfield (2nd season)
- Defensive coordinator: Donnie Suber (6th season)
- Home stadium: Tucker Stadium

2023 Big South–OVC football standings
	Conf.			Overall
Team	W		L	W		L
Gardner–Webb +^	5	–	1	7	–	5
No. 25 UT Martin +	5	–	1	8	–	3
Eastern Illinois	4	–	2	8	–	3
Bryant	4	–	2	6	–	5
Southeast Missouri State	3	–	3	4	–	7
Tennessee Tech	2	–	4	4	–	7
Robert Morris	2	–	4	4	–	7
Charleston Southern	2	–	4	4	–	7
Tennessee State	2	–	4	6	–	5
Lindenwood *	1	–	5	3	–	7
+ – Conference co-champions; ^ – FCS playoff participant; Note: Lindenwood ineligible for Big South–OVC title and FCS postseason play due to transition from NCAA Division II.; Rankings from STATS Poll

The 2023 Tennessee Tech Golden Eagles football team represented Tennessee Technological University as a member of the Ohio Valley Conference (OVC) during the 2023 NCAA Division I FCS football season. Led by sixth-year head coach Dewayne Alexander, the Golden Eagles played home games at Tucker Stadium in Cookeville, Tennessee. The 2023 season was the last for coach Dewayne Alexander.

== Schedule ==
Date	Time	Opponent	Site	TV	Result	Attendance
August 31	6:00 p.m.	at No. 6 Furman*	Paladin Stadium; Greenville, SC	ESPN+	L 10–45	9,827
September 9	7:00 p.m.	at New Mexico*	University Stadium; Albuquerque, NM	Stadium	L 10–56	17,279
September 16	6:00 p.m.	North Alabama*	Tucker Stadium; Cookeville, TN	ESPN+	L 7–20	7,676
September 23	6:00 p.m.	Kennesaw State*	Tucker Stadium; Cookeville, TN	ESPN+	W 17–7	9,923
October 7	1:00 p.m.	at Lindenwood	Harlen C. Hunter Stadium; St. Charles, MO	ESPN+	L 0–23	3,622
October 14	12:30 p.m.	at South Carolina State*	Oliver C. Dawson Stadium; Orangeburg, SC	ESPN+	W 28–7	5,969
October 21	1:30 p.m.	Southeast Missouri State	Tucker Stadium; Cookeville, TN	ESPN+	L 3–28	6,577
October 28	11:00 a.m.	at Robert Morris*	Joe Walton Stadium; Moon Township, PA	ESPN+	W 38–13	1,727
November 4	1:30 p.m.	No. 21 UT Martin^{†}	Tucker Stadium; Cookeville, TN (Sgt. York Trophy)	ESPN+	L 41–44 ^{OT}	10,187
November 11	1:30 p.m.	Gardner–Webb*	Tucker Stadium; Cookeville, TN	ESPN+	L 0–35	5,740
November 18	2:00 p.m.	at Tennessee State	Hale Stadium; Nashville, TN (Sgt. York Trophy)	ESPN+	W 35–0	2,552
*Non-conference game; ^{†}Homecoming; Rankings from STATS Poll released prior to the game; All times are in Central time
