= Ernest W. Spangler Stadium =

Stadium in North Carolina

Coordinates: 35.245637°N 81.673243°W

- Interactive map of Ernest W. Spangler Stadium
- Location: Stadium Drive; Boiling Springs, North Carolina 28152
- Owner: Gardner–Webb University
- Operator: Gardner–Webb University
- Capacity: 9,000
- Surface: Turf

Construction
- Opened: 1969

Tenant
- Gardner–Webb Runnin' Bulldogs (NCAA)

Ernest W. Spangler Stadium is a 9,000-seat multi-purpose stadium in Boiling Springs, North Carolina. It is home to the Gardner–Webb University Bulldogs football team. The facility opened in 1969. Spangler Stadium underwent a $7 million overhaul in 2005 that included additions of a new Football Center that houses football coaches' offices, athletic weight facilities, president's box, press box, and other luxury boxes.

== See also ==
- List of NCAA Division I FCS football stadiums

Events and tenants
Preceded by Fawcett Stadium	Host of the Victory Bowl; 2001	Succeeded by Hubert H. Humphrey Metrodome
