= OVC–Big South Football Association =

American college football conference

- Association: NCAA
- Founded: 2023; 3 years ago
- Folded: 2026; 0 years ago
- Sports fielded: 1; men's: 1; women's: 0
- Division: Division I
- Subdivision: FCS
- No. of teams: 8
- Region: Midwestern United States; Southern United States
- Website: bigsouthovcfootball.com

Locations
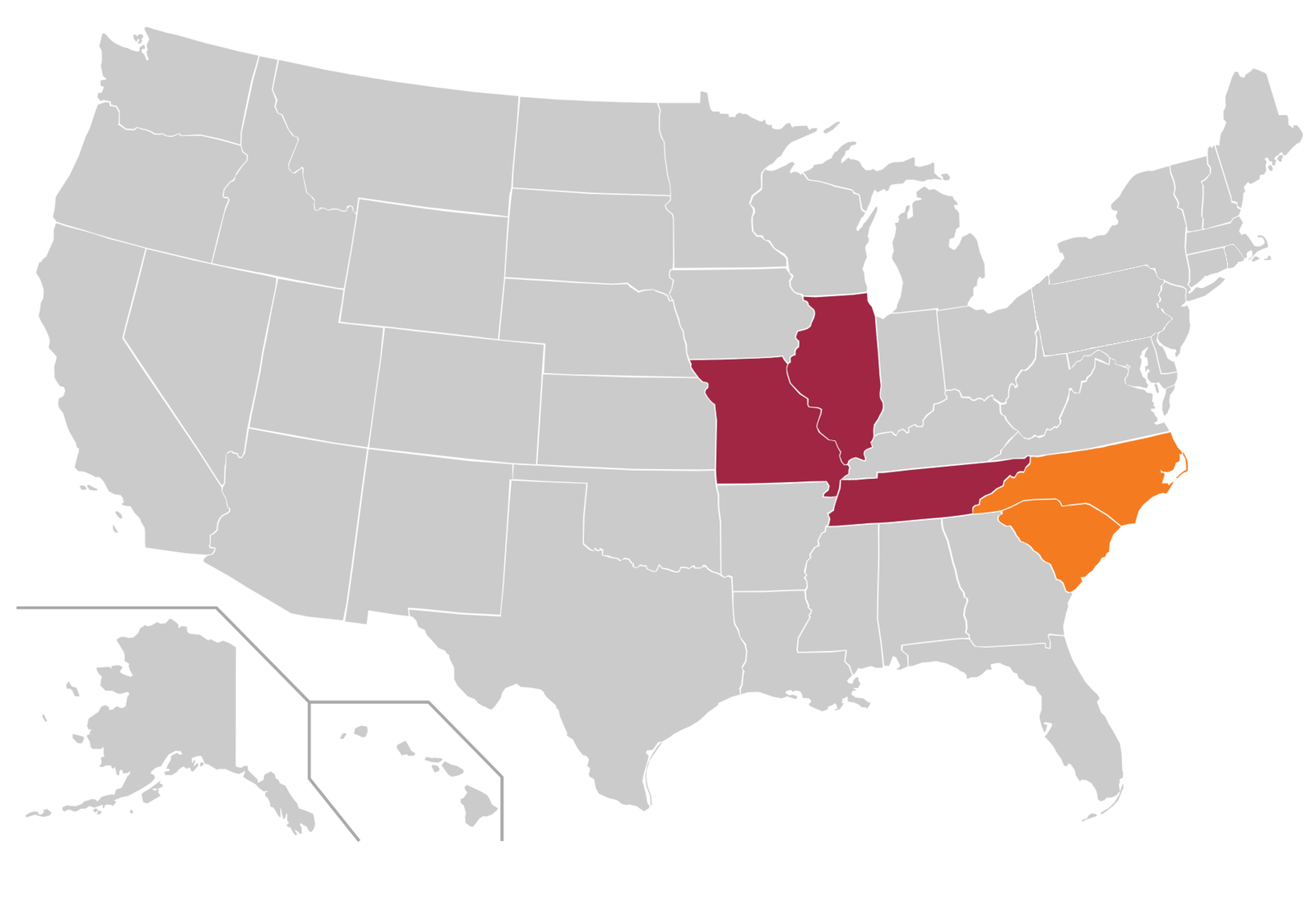

The OVC–Big South Football Association was an association of football members of the Big South Conference and Ohio Valley Conference (OVC). The OVC–Big South covered the American Midwest and South with member institutions located in Illinois, Missouri, North Carolina, South Carolina, and Tennessee.

== History ==
=== Big South Conference ===
In the 2021–22 season, the Big South Conference was made up of nine football-playing members including full members Campbell University, Charleston Southern University, Gardner-Webb University, Hampton University, and North Carolina A&T State University, and associate members Kennesaw State University, Monmouth University, University of North Alabama, and Robert Morris University. The following changes occurred dwindling the football membership from nine members in 2021 to four members by 2023, dropping below the minimum of six members required for an automatic bid for the NCAA Division I FCS Playoffs.

- On January 29, 2021, the ASUN Conference announced its intent of sponsoring football in the Football Championship Subdivision (FCS) for the 2022. The new league lead to the departure of Kennesaw State University and University of North Alabama after the 2021 season.
- On January 25, 2022, the Colonial Athletic Association (CAA; since renamed the Coastal Athletic Association) announced that Hampton University and Monmouth University would join that conference on July 1, 2022. Both also joined CAA Football, the CAA's legally separate football league, at that time.
- On February 22, 2022, the CAA also announced that North Carolina A&T State University would be leaving the Big South, joining CAA Football on July 1, 2023.
- On March 29, 2022, Bryant University announced as a new football-only member effective with the 2022 season.
- On August 3, 2022, Campbell University announced that it would join the multi-sports CAA and CAA Football in 2023 as well.

=== Ohio Valley Conference ===
The Ohio Valley Conference also dropped below the number of eligible teams required for an automatic bid for the NCAA Division I FCS Playoffs between the 2021 and 2023 seasons. In the 2021 season, the OVC included Austin Peay State University, Eastern Illinois University, Murray State University, Southeast Missouri State University, University of Tennessee, Martin, Tennessee State University, and Tennessee Tech University. The following changes occurred to lower eligible football-playing members from seven to five by 2023.

- On September 17, 2021, Austin Peay State University left for the ASUN Conference, which ultimately launched its own football league in 2022.
- On January 7, 2022, Murray State University announced its intent to leave the OVC, left for the Missouri Valley Conference and Missouri Valley Football Conference. In a separate statement, Murray State's president indicated that the football team would remain in the OVC in the 2022 season, ensuring that the OVC would retain its automatic bid to the FCS playoffs in that season and giving the league more time to add new football members. Murray State would eventually be accepted by the MVFC effective in 2023.
- On February 23, 2022, the OVC added Lindenwood University, transitioning from D-II. Lindenwood will not be eligible for the postseason until the 2026–27 season, therefore it will not count towards the football membership for the automatic qualifying bid for the FCS playoffs until then.

=== Merger ===
On February 22, the conference announced its intent to combine its football membership with the Ohio Valley Conference beginning in 2023. With the release of the 2023 joint football schedule, it was announced that the partnership between the two conferences would exist through the 2026–27 season. The inaugural members of the merger included Bryant University, Charleston Southern University, Gardner-Webb University, and Robert Morris University from the Big South, and Eastern Illinois University, Lindenwood University, Southeast Missouri State University, University of Tennessee, Martin, Tennessee State University, and Tennessee Tech University from the Ohio Valley. The following year, in June 2024, the two conferences announced that they had agreed to extend their partnership through 2030.

On May 12, 2023, the OVC added Western Illinois University from the Summit League. Western Illinois previously housed its football program in the Missouri Valley Football Conference, and it was announced that the Leathernecks would play out the 2023 season in the MVFC before joining its other sports and competing under the Big South-OVC banner for 2024 and beyond.

On August 10, 2023, prior to the start of the association's inaugural season, Bryant announced it would depart from the association to join CAA Football in 2024. Later that year, on November 28, 2023, Robert Morris announced that it would also depart from the association to re-join the Northeast Conference as an associate member for football in 2024.

On June 18, 2026, the OVC announced it would return to competing under the Ohio Valley Conference name and logo beginning with the 2026 season, effectively ending the association. Tennessee Tech would leave the OVC altogether that year to join the Southern Conference in all sports, including football, while the remaining members of the OVC–Big South would begin competition under the OVC branding, with Charleston Southern and Gardner–Webb joining the OVC as affiliate members for football.

OVC–Big South Football
Location of OVC–Big South members:
– current member

== Member schools ==
=== Final members ===
Team	Location	Nickname	Stadium	Capacity	Joined	Left	Current primary conference	Current football conference
Charleston Southern University	North Charleston, South Carolina	Buccaneers	Buccaneer Field	4,000	2023	2026	Big South (BSC)	Ohio Valley (OVC)
Eastern Illinois University	Charleston, Illinois	Panthers	O'Brien Field	10,000	2023	2026	Ohio Valley (OVC)	
Gardner–Webb University	Boiling Springs, North Carolina	Runnin' Bulldogs	Ernest W. Spangler Stadium	7,800	2023	2026	Big South (BSC)	Ohio Valley (OVC)
Lindenwood University	St. Charles, Missouri	Lions	Hunter Stadium	7,450	2023	2026	Ohio Valley (OVC)	
Southeast Missouri State University	Cape Girardeau, Missouri	Redhawks	Houck Stadium	11,015	2023	2026	Ohio Valley (OVC)	
Tennessee State University	Nashville, Tennessee	Tigers	Nissan Stadium	68,000	2023	2026	Ohio Valley (OVC)	
University of Tennessee at Martin	Martin, Tennessee	Skyhawks	Graham Stadium	7,500	2023	2026	Ohio Valley (OVC)	
Tennessee Technological University	Cookeville, Tennessee	Golden Eagles	Tucker Stadium	16,500	2023	2026	Southern (SoCon)	
Western Illinois University	Macomb, Illinois	Leathernecks	Hanson Field	16,368	2024	2026	Ohio Valley (OVC)	

=== Former members ===
Team	Location	Nickname	Stadium	Capacity	Joined	Left	Current primary conference	Current football conference
Bryant University	Smithfield, Rhode Island	Bulldogs	Beirne Stadium	5,500	2023	2024	America East (AmEast) (Note: Bryant and Robert Morris were football-only members of the Big South prior to the merger.)	CAA Football
Robert Morris University	Moon Township, Pennsylvania	Colonials	Joe Walton Stadium	3,000	2023	2024	Horizon	Northeast (NEC)

=== Membership timeline ===
Full members Other conference
