= 2024 Lindenwood Lions football team =

American college football season

2024 Lindenwood Lions football
- Conference: Big South–OVC football
- Record: 5–7 (4–4 Big South–OVC)
- Head coach: Jed Stugart (7th season)
- Offensive coordinator: Dusty Hovorka (7th season)
- Defensive coordinator: Eric Inama (7th season)
- Home stadium: Harlen C. Hunter Stadium

2024 Big South–OVC football standings
	Conf.			Overall
Team	W		L	W		L
No. 16 Southeast Missouri State +^	6	–	2	9	–	4
Tennessee Tech +	6	–	2	7	–	5
No. 17 UT Martin +^	6	–	2	9	–	5
No. 19 Tennessee State +^	6	–	2	9	–	4
Lindenwood*	4	–	4	5	–	7
Western Illinois	3	–	5	4	–	8
Gardner–Webb	3	–	5	4	–	8
Eastern Illinois	2	–	6	3	–	9
Charleston Southern	0	–	8	1	–	11
+ – Conference co-champions; ^ – FCS playoff participant; Note: Lindenwood ineligible for Big South–OVC title and FCS postseason play due to transition from NCAA Division II.; Rankings from STATS Poll

The 2024 Lindenwood Lions football team represented Lindenwood University as a member of the Big South–OVC Football Association in the 2024 NCAA Division I FCS football season. Led by seventh-year head coach Jed Stugart, the Lions compiled an overall record of 5–7 with a mark of 4–4 in conference play, placing fifth in the Big South–OVC. Lindenwood played home games at Harlen C. Hunter Stadium in St. Charles, Missouri.

== Preseason ==
=== Preseason poll ===
The Big South-OVC Conference released their preseason poll on July 17, 2024. The Lions were picked to finish eighth in the conference.

=== Transfers ===
==== Outgoing ====
Player	Position	New school
Chris Gannaway	RB	Arkansas-Pine Bluff
Jayson Lowe	LB	Middle Tennessee

==== Incoming ====
Player	Position	Previous school
Ashtin Rustemeyer	DL	Arkansas State
Cameron Cooper	OL	Colorado State
Joshua Pena	WR	FIU
Cole Mueller	RB	Illinois State
Reece Thomas	WR	Kansas
Nate Glantz	QB	McNeese
Kendric Bailey	DB	Montana State
Cortezz Jones	RB	Murray State
Jordan Knapke	LB	Northern Colorado
Vincent King	LB	Northern Colorado
Tony Failla	OL	Southeast Missouri State

== Schedule ==
Date	Time	Opponent	Site	TV	Result	Attendance
August 29	7:00 p.m.	at No. 22 (FBS) Kansas*	Children's Mercy Park; Kansas City, KS	ESPN+	L 3–48	20,829
September 7	6:00 p.m.	No. 9 Central Arkansas*	Harlen C. Hunter Stadium; St. Charles, MO	ESPN+	L 13–34	4,668
September 14	6:00 p.m.	at Missouri State*	Robert W. Plaster Stadium; Springfield, MO	FloSports	L 14–28	9,642
September 21	1:00 p.m.	St. Thomas*	Harlen C. Hunter Stadium; St. Charles, MO	ESPN+	W 64–0	3,825
September 28	2:00 p.m.	at Eastern Illinois	O'Brien Field; Charleston, IL	ESPN+	W 28–25	3,890
October 5	1:00 p.m.	Tennessee State	Harlen C. Hunter Stadium; St. Charles, MO	ESPN+	L 20–24	3,103
October 12	1:00 p.m.	Charleston Southern	Harlen C. Hunter Stadium; St. Charles, MO	ESPN+	W 29–14	2,765
October 19	12:30 p.m.	at Gardner–Webb	Ernest W. Spangler Stadium; Boiling Springs, NC	ESPN+	L 35–42	3,780
October 26	2:00 p.m.	Western Illinois^{†}	Harlen C. Hunter Stadium; St. Charles, MO	ESPN+	W 49–38	3,697
November 2	1:30 p.m.	at Tennessee Tech	Tucker Stadium; Cookeville, TN	ESPN+	L 10–52	8,144
November 9	1:00 p.m.	No. 6 Southeast Missouri State	Harlen C. Hunter Stadium; St. Charles, MO	ESPN+	W 24–12	5,108
November 23	2:00 p.m.	at No. 22 UT Martin	Graham Stadium; Martin, TN	ESPN+	L 26–33 ^{OT}	2,208
*Non-conference game; ^{†}Homecoming; Rankings from STATS Poll released prior to the game; All times are in Central time

== Game summaries ==
=== at No. 22 (FBS) Kansas ===
Game One – Lindenwood Lions (0-0) vs No. 22 (FBS) Kansas Jayhawks (0-0) – Game summary

Quarter	1	2	3	4	Total
Lions	0	0	0	3	3
No. 22 (FBS) Jayhawks	7	7	27	7	48

at Children's Mercy Park • Kansas City, MO

- Date: Thursday August 29, 2024
- Game time: 7:00 PM CST
- Game weather: Sunny, 84 °F (29 °C)
- Game attendance: 20,829
- Referee: Luke Richmond
- TV announcers (ESPN+): Sean Kenney (play-by-play) and Taylor McHargue (analyst)

Game information

First quarter

- (09:44) KU – Devin Neal 5-yard run, Tabor Allen kick (Drive: 9 plays, 65 yards, 3:55; Kansas 7–0)

Second quarter

- (10:11) KU – Devin Neal 1-yard run, Tabor Allen kick (Drive: 7 plays, 85 yards, 3:23; Kansas 14–0)
- (08:42) KU – Mello Dotson 33-yard Interception Return, Tabor Allen PAT failed (Drive: 3 plays, 2 yards, 1:29; Kansas 20–0)
- (07:07) KU – Luke Grimm 58-yard pass from Jalon Daniels, Tabor Allen kick (Drive: 3 plays, 66 yards, 0:51; Kansas 27–0)
- (00:04) KU – Daniel Hishaw Jr 1-yard run, Tabor Allen kick (Drive: 7 plays, 95 yards, 3:00; Kansas 34–0)

Third quarter

- (08:23) KU – Sevion Morrison 1-yard run, Tabor Allen kick (Drive: 11 plays, 85 yards, 6:32; Kansas 41–0)

Fourth quarter

- (13:22) KU – Doug Emilien 4-yard pass from Cole Ballard, Tabor Allen kick (Drive: 11 plays, 90 yards, 5:39; Kansas 48–0)
- (06:12) LIN – Logan Seibert 34-yard field goal (Drive: 14 plays, 75 yards, 7:04; Kansas 48–3)

Statistics	LIN	KU
First downs	12	26
Total yards	202	530
Rushing yards	75	331
Passing yards	127	199
Passing: Comp–Att–Int	18–31–1	14–21–1
Time of possession	28:58	31:02

Team	Category	Player	Statistics
Lindenwood	Passing	Nate Glantz	18/31, 127 yards, INT
Lindenwood	Rushing	Steve Hall	7 carries, 26 yards
Lindenwood	Receiving	Abe Haerr	4 receptions, 58 yards
Kansas	Passing	Jalon Daniels	9/15, 148 yards, TD, INT
Kansas	Rushing	Devin Neal	8 carries, 112 yards, 2 TDs
Kansas	Receiving	Luke Grimm	6 receptions, 1111 yards, TD

=== No. 9 Central Arkansas ===
Game Two – No. 9 Central Arkansas Bears (0-1) at Lindenwood Lions (0-1) – Game summary

Quarter	1	2	3	4	Total
No. 9 Bears	0	13	7	14	34
Lions	3	0	3	7	13

at Harlen C. Hunter Stadium • St. Charles, Missouri

- Date: Saturday September 7, 2024
- Game time: 6:00 p.m.
- Game weather: Sunny, 73 °F (23 °C)
- Game attendance: 4,668
- Referee: Michael Lennie
- TV announcers (ESPN+): TBD

Game information

First quarter

- (1:08) LIN – Logan Seibert 32 yard field goal (8 plays, 64 yards, 3:50; LIN 3–0)

Second quarter

- (11:11) UCA – ShunDerrick Powell 4 yard run (Drive: 13 plays, 75 yards, 4:57; UCA 6–3)
- (3:36) UCA – ShunDerrick Powell 55 yard run, Jake Gaster kick (Drive: 6 plays, 93 yards, 3:07; UCA 13–3)

Third quarter

- (8:17) LIN – Logan Seibert 20 yard field goal (Drive: 10 plays, 71 yards, 5:05; UCA 13–6)
- (6:32) UCA – ShunDerrick Powell 69 yard pass from Will McElvain, Jake Gaster kick (Drive: 4 plays, 85 yards, 1:39; UCA 20–6)

Fourth quarter

- (13:43) UCA – Darius Hale 1 yard run, Jake Gaster kick (Drive: 8 plays, 69 yards, 3:16; UCA 27–6)
- (7:08) LIN – Reece Thomas 4 yard pass from Nate Glantz, Logan Seibert kick (Drive: 10 plays, 68 yards, 3:32; UCA 27–13)
- (3:17) UCA – Darius Hale 3 yard run, Jake Gaster kick (Drive: 8 plays, 75 yards, 3:51; UCA 34–13)

Statistics	UCA	LIN
First downs	21	15
Total yards	554	258
Rushing yards	221	76
Passing yards	333	182
Passing: Comp–Att–Int	20–28–0	17–33–0
Time of possession	30:04	29:56

Team	Category	Player	Statistics
Central Arkansas	Passing	Will McElvain	20/28, 333 yards, 1 TD
Central Arkansas	Rushing	ShunDerrick Powell	17 carries, 126 yards, 2 TD
Central Arkansas	Receiving	Kam Robinson	6 receptions, 112 yards
Lindenwood	Passing	Nate Glantz	17/33, 182 yards, TD
Lindenwood	Rushing	Steve Hall	11 carries, 59 yards
Lindenwood	Receiving	Jeff Caldwell	6 receptions, 99 yards

=== at Missouri State ===
Game Three – Lindenwood Lions (0–2) at Missouri State Bears (0–2) – Game summary

Quarter	1	2	3	4	Total
Lions	0	7	0	7	14
Bears	14	7	7	0	28

at Robert W. Plaster Stadium • Springfield, MO

- Date: Saturday September 14, 2024
- Game time: 6:00 PM
- Game weather: Sunny, 80 °F (27 °C)
- Game attendance: 9,642
- Referee: Jason Berg
- TV announcers (ESPN+): TBD

Game information

First quarter

- (9:32) MOST – Jmariyae Robinson 32 yard pass from Jacob Clark, Yousef Obeid kick (Drive: 6 plays, 85 yards, 3:07; MOST 7–0)
- (2:07) MOST – Lance Mason 10 yard pass from Jacob Clark, Yousef Obeid kick (Drive: 9 plays, 86 yards, 4:55; MOST 14–0)

Second quarter

- (9:21) MOST – Jacardia Wright 3 yard run, Yousef Obeid kick (Drive: 10 plays, 78 yards, 5:29; MOST 21–0)
- (5:38) LIN – Nate Glantz 1 yard run, Logan Seibert kick (Drive: 9 plays, 79 yards, 3:36; MOST 21–7)

Third quarter

- (10:04) MOST – Jacardia Wright 4 yard run, Yousef Obeid kick (Drive: 9 plays, 75 yards, 4:56; MOST 28–7)

Fourth quarter

- (1:00) LIN – Jeff Caldwell 79 yard pass from Tyler Kubat, Logan Seibert kick (Drive: 3 plays, 71 yards, 0:57; MOST 28–14)

Statistics	LIN	MOST
First downs	18	28
Total yards	328	476
Rushing yards	127	174
Passing yards	201	302
Passing: Comp–Att–Int	14–24–3	28–33–0
Time of possession	23:41	36:19

Team	Category	Player	Statistics
Lindenwood	Passing	Nate Glantz	13/22, 122 yards, 3 INT
Lindenwood	Rushing	Steve Hall	13 carries, 100 yards
Lindenwood	Receiving	Jeff Caldwell	6 receptions, 137 yards, 1 TD
Missouri State	Passing	Jacob Clark	28/33, 302 yards, 2 TD
Missouri State	Rushing	Jacardia Wright	21 carries, 143 yards, 2 TD
Missouri State	Receiving	Hunter Wood	10 receptions, 90 yards

=== St. Thomas (MN) ===
Game Four – St. Thomas Tommies (1–2) vs Lindenwood Lions (0–3) – Game summary

Quarter	1	2	3	4	Total
Tommies	0	0	0	0	0
Lions	7	35	16	6	64

at Harlen C. Hunter Stadium • St. Charles, MO

- Date: September 21, 2024
- Game time: 1:00 p.m.
- Game weather: Cloudy, 87 °F (31 °C)
- Game attendance: 3,825
- Referee: Tremain Williams
- TV announcers (ESPN+): TBD

Game information

First quarter

- (8:30) LIN – Luke Cook 0 yard blocked punt return, Logan Seibert kick (LIN 7–0)

Second quarter

- (14:50) LIN – Cortezz Jones 51 yard run, Logan Seibert kick (Drive: 6 plays, 76 yards, 3:12; LIN 14–0)
- (1:19) LIN – Nate Glantz 16 yard run, Logan Seibert kick (Drive: 6 plays, 62 yards, 2:37; LIN 21–0)
- (8:48) LIN – Cortezz Jones 48 yard run, Logan Seibert kick (Drive: 2 plays, 59 yards, 0:30; LIN 28–0)
- (3:03) LIN – Jeff Caldwell 93 yard pass from Nate Glantz, Logan Seibert kick (Drive: 2 plays, 97 yards, 0:49; LIN 35–0)
- (0:07) LIN – Nate Glantz 2 yard run, Logan Seibert kick (Drive: 11 plays, 73 yards, 1:56; LIN 42–0)

Third quarter

- (10:40) LIN – Logan Seibert 42 yard field goal (Drive: 10 plays, 40 yards, 4:20; LIN 45–0)
- (6:27) LIN – Jeff Caldwell 29 yard pass from Nate Glantz, Logan Seibert kick (Drive: 4 plays, 54 yards, 1:31; LIN 52–0)
- (4:51) LIN – Robert Giaimo 19 yard run (Drive: 1 play, 19 yards, 0:09; LIN 58–0)

Fourth quarter

- (14:20) LIN – Logan Seibert 32 yard field goal (Drive: 8 plays, 17 yards, 4:17; LIN 61–0)
- (4:52) LIN – Logan Seibert 46 yard field goal (Drive: 5 plays, 10 yards, 2:57; LIN 64–0)

Statistics	STMN	LIN
First downs	9	27
Total yards	148	543
Rushing yards	107	279
Passing yards	41	264
Passing: Comp–Att–Int	8–22–2	17–23–0
Time of possession	28:50	31:10

Team	Category	Player	Statistics
St. Thomas (MN)	Passing	Michael Rostberg	3/12, 23 yards, 2 INT
St. Thomas (MN)	Rushing	Joseph Koch	13 carries, 41 yards
St. Thomas (MN)	Receiving	Colin Chase	1 reception, 15 yards
Lindenwood	Passing	Nate Glantz	13/18, 228 yards, 2 TD
Lindenwood	Rushing	Cortezz Jones	10 carries, 152 yards, 2 TD
Lindenwood	Receiving	Jeff Caldwell	5 receptions, 153 yards, 2 TD

=== at Eastern Illinois ===
Game Five – Lindenwood Lions (1–3) at Eastern Illinois Panthers (1–3) – Game summary

Quarter	1	2	3	4	Total
Lions	0	0	14	14	28
Panthers	14	3	0	8	25

at O'Brien Field • Charleston, IL

- Date: Saturday September 28, 2024
- Game time: 2:00 PM
- Game weather: Cloudy, 73 °F (23 °C)
- Game attendance: 3,890
- Referee: Branden McCain
- TV announcers (ESPN+): Mike Bradd (play-by-play), Dave Kidwell (analyst) and Kacy Standohar (sideline)

Game information

First quarter
Second quarter
Third quarter
Fourth quarter

Statistics	LIN	EIU
First downs	20	25
Total yards	453	458
Rushing yards	170	132
Passing yards	283	326
Passing: Comp–Att–Int	14–19–1	26–44–0
Time of possession	29:22	30:38

Team	Category	Player	Statistics
Lindenwood	Passing	Nate Glantz	14/19, 283 yards, 4 TD, 1 INT
Lindenwood	Rushing	Cortezz Jones	20 carries, 104 yards
Lindenwood	Receiving	Jeff Caldwell	4 receptions, 115 yards, 4 TD
Eastern Illinois	Passing	Pierce Holley	26/43, 326 yards, 2 TD
Eastern Illinois	Rushing	MJ Flowers	28 carries, 123 yards
Eastern Illinois	Receiving	Terrance Gipson	9 receptions, 93 yards

=== Tennessee State ===
Game Six – Tennessee State Tigers (3–2) vs Lindenwood Lions (2–3) – Game summary

Quarter	1	2	3	4	Total
Tigers	7	0	10	7	24
Lions	14	6	0	0	20

at Harlen C. Hunter Stadium • St. Charles, MO

- Date: October 5, 2024
- Game time: 1:00 p.m.
- Game weather: Sunny, 84 °F (29 °C)
- Game attendance: 3,103
- Referee: Matthew Jones
- TV announcers (ESPN+): Bob Ramsey (play-by-play), Zach Zook (analyst) and Jacob Stanoch (sideline)

Game information

First quarter
Second quarter
Third quarter
Fourth quarter

Statistics	TNST	LIN
First downs	15	14
Total yards	285	280
Rushing yards	89	181
Passing yards	196	99
Passing: Comp–Att–Int	14–26–1	11–20–0
Time of possession	31:33	28:27

Team	Category	Player	Statistics
Tennessee State	Passing	Draylen Ellis	14/26, 196 yards, 1 TD, 1 INT
Tennessee State	Rushing	Jaden McGill	15 carries, 63 yards
Tennessee State	Receiving	CJ Evans	3 receptions, 74 yards, 1 TD
Lindenwood	Passing	Nate Glantz	11/20, 99 yards, 1 TD
Lindenwood	Rushing	Steve Hall	7 carries, 67 yards
Lindenwood	Receiving	Jeff Caldwell	3 receptions, 45 yards, 1 TD

=== Charleston Southern ===
Game Seven – Charleston Southern Buccaneers (1–4) vs Lindenwood Lions (2–4) – Game summary

Quarter	1	2	3	4	Total
Buccaneers	0	14	0	0	14
Lions	10	10	3	6	29

at Harlen C. Hunter Stadium • St. Charles, MO

- Date: October 12, 2024
- Game time: 1:00 p.m.
- Game weather: Sunny, 83 °F (28 °C)
- Game attendance: 2,765
- Referee: Brad Carrell
- TV announcers (ESPN+): Justin Biegel (play-by-play) and Jack Delongchamps (analyst)

Game information

First quarter
Second quarter
Third quarter
Fourth quarter

Statistics	CHSO	LIN
First downs	8	25
Total yards	197	392
Rushing yards	98	240
Passing yards	99	152
Passing: Comp–Att–Int	15–29–2	12–25–1
Time of possession	19:35	40:25

Team	Category	Player	Statistics
Charleston Southern	Passing	Rob McCoy Jr	14/23, 98 yards, 2 INT
Charleston Southern	Rushing	Autavius Ison	14 carries, 77 yards
Charleston Southern	Receiving	Chris Rhone	4 receptions, 46 yards
Lindenwood	Passing	Nate Glantz	12/25, 152 yards, 1 INT
Lindenwood	Rushing	Nate Glantz	18 carries, 103 yards
Lindenwood	Receiving	Jeff Caldwell	2 receptions, 52 yards

=== at Gardner–Webb ===
Game Eight – Lindenwood Lions (3–4) vs Gardner–Webb Runnin' Bulldogs (1–5) – Game summary

Quarter	1	2	3	4	Total
Lions	7	7	7	14	35
Runnin' Bulldogs	7	21	14	0	42

at Ernest W. Spangler Stadium • Boiling Springs, NC

- Date: Saturday October 19, 2024
- Game time: 12:30 p.m.
- Game weather: Sunny, 71 °F (22 °C)
- Game attendance: 3,780
- Referee: John Kellermeier
- TV announcers (ESPN+): TBD

Game information

First quarter

- (9:45) GWEB – Anthony Lowe 3 yard pass from Tyler Ridell, Jay Billingsley kick (Drive: 12 plays, 75 yards, 5:15; GWEB 7–0)
- (3:31) LIN – Reece Thomas 21 yard pass from Nate Glantz, Logan Seibert kick (Drive: 10 plays, 75 yards, 6:14; TIE 7–7)

Second quarter

- (14:00) GWEB – Edward Saydee 13 yard run, Jay Billingsley kick (Drive: 10 plays, 72 yards, 4:21; GWEB 14–7)
- (10:50) LIN – Cortezz Jones 2 yard run, Logan Seibert kick (Drive: 7 plays, 88 yards, 3:01; TIE 14–14)
- (7:11) GWEB – Jordan Bly 19 yard pass from Tyler Ridell, Jay Billingsley kick (Drive: 7 plays, 75 yards, 3:39; GWEB 21–14)
- (0:22) GWEB – Jordan Bly 26 yard pass from Tyler Ridell, Jay Billingsley kick (Drive: 6 plays, 45 yards, 1:23; GWEB 28–14)

Third quarter

- (12:06) LIN – Jeff Caldwell 49 yard pass from Nate Glantz, Logan Seibert kick (Drive: 7 plays, 74 yards, 2:54; GWEB 28–21)
- (9:52) GWEB – Taylor Shields 11 yard pass from Tyler Ridell, Jay Billingsley kick (Drive: 6 plays, 69 yards, 2:03; GWEB 35–21)
- (2:41) GWEB – Quasean Holmes 17 yard run, Jay Billingsley kick (Drive: 4 plays, 40 yards, 0:59; GWEB 42–21)

Fourth quarter

- (14:55) LIN – Steve Hall 17 yard run, Logan Seibert kick (Drive: 6 plays, 75 yards, 2:46; GWEB 42–28)
- (0:31) LIN – Drew Krobath 23 yard pass from Nate Glantz, Logan Seibert kick (Drive: 5 plays, 91 yards, 1:23; GWEB 42–35)

Statistics	LIN	GWEB
First downs	23	32
Total yards	457	491
Rushing yards	213	306
Passing yards	244	185
Passing: Comp–Att–Int	12–27–1	16–21–0
Time of possession	27:44	32:16

Team	Category	Player	Statistics
Lindenwood	Passing	Nate Glantz	12/27, 244 yards, 3 TD, 1 INT
Lindenwood	Rushing	Steve Hall	11 carries, 78 yards, 1 TD
Lindenwood	Receiving	Jeff Caldwell	6 receptions, 174 yards, 1 TD
Gardner–Webb	Passing	Tyler Ridell	16/21, 185 yards, 4 TD
Gardner–Webb	Rushing	Quasean Holmes	26 carries, 156 yards, 1 TD
Gardner–Webb	Receiving	Jordan Bly	4 receptions, 52 yards, 2 TD

=== Western Illinois ===
Game Nine – Western Illinois Leathernecks (3–4) vs Lindenwood Lions (3–5) – Game summary

Quarter	1	2	3	4	Total
Leathernecks	7	10	14	7	38
Lions	14	7	14	14	49

at Harlen C. Hunter Stadium • St. Charles, MO

- Date: Saturday October 26, 2024
- Game time: 2:00 p.m.
- Game weather: Sunny, 64 °F (18 °C)
- Game attendance: 3,697
- Referee: Michael Frain
- TV announcers (ESPN+): TBD

Game information

First quarter
Second quarter
Third quarter
Fourth quarter

Statistics	WIU	LIN
First downs	37	24
Total yards	713	572
Rushing yards	149	389
Passing yards	564	183
Passing: Comp–Att–Int	42–55–0	11–16–0
Time of possession	36:06	23:54

Team	Category	Player	Statistics
Western Illinois	Passing	Nathan Lamb	42/55, 564 yards, 5 TD
Western Illinois	Rushing	Cameren Smith	17 carries, 67 yards
Western Illinois	Receiving	Matthew Henry	15 receptions, 226 yards, 1 TD
Lindenwood	Passing	Nate Glantz	11/16, 183 yards, 2 TD
Lindenwood	Rushing	Steve Hall	13 carries, 259 yards, 4 TD
Lindenwood	Receiving	Abe Haerr	1 reception, 57 yards

=== at Tennessee Tech ===
Game Ten – Lindenwood Lions (4–5) vs Tennessee Tech Golden Eagles (3–5) – Game summary

Quarter	1	2	3	4	Total
Lions	0	0	7	3	10
Golden Eagles	7	10	28	7	52

at Tucker Stadium • Cookeville, TN

- Date: Saturday November 2, 2024
- Game time: 1:30 p.m.
- Game weather: Sunny, 71 °F (22 °C)
- Game attendance: 8,144
- Referee: Drew Myers
- TV announcers (ESPN+): Dylan Vazzano (play-by-play) and Sam Brooks (analyst)

Game information

First quarter

- (7:32) TTU – Jalen Mitchell 35 yard run, Dom LeBlanc kick (Drive: 7 plays, 69 yards, 3:55; TTU 7–0)

Second quarter

- (10:37) TTU – Dom LeBlanc 22 yard field goal (Drive: 18 plays, 93 yards, 8:32; TTU 10–0)
- (2:56) TTU – D.J. Linkins 31 yard pass from Dylan Laible, Dom LeBlanc kick (Drive: 4 plays, 44 yards, 2:21; TTU 17–0)

Third quarter

- (12:59) TTU – Aidan Littles 22 yard run, Dom LeBlanc kick (Drive: 4 plays, 75 yards, 2:01; TTU 24–0)
- (12:52) TTU – Cayman Spaulding 29 yard interception return, Dom LeBlanc kick (Drive: 1 play, 0 yards, 0:07; TTU 31–0)
- (8:32) LIN – Darrin Fugitt 23 yard pass from Nate Glantz, Logan Seibert kick (Drive: 10 plays, 75 yards, 4:20; TTU 31–7)
- (4:17) TTU – Tyler Wilson 22 yard run, Dom LeBlanc kick (Drive: 8 plays, 75 yards, 4:15; TTU 38–7)
- (0:13) TTU – Jordan Yates 10 yard run, Dom LeBlanc kick (Drive: 4 plays, 31 yards, 2:10; TTU 45–7)

Fourth quarter

- (9:18) LIN – Logan Seibert 21 yard field goal (Drive: 16 plays, 69 yards, 5:55; TTU 45–10)
- (8:37) TTU – Torin Baker 67 yard run, Dom LeBlanc kick (Drive: 2 plays, 75 yards, 0:41; TTU 52–10)

Statistics	LIN	TNTC
First downs	17	24
Total yards	249	519
Rushing yards	68	400
Passing yards	181	119
Passing: Comp–Att–Int	17–28–1	13–20–0
Time of possession	29:19	30:41

Team	Category	Player	Statistics
Lindenwood	Passing	Nate Glantz	17/27, 181 yards, 1 TD, 1 INT
Lindenwood	Rushing	Robert Giaimo	10 carries, 44 yards
Lindenwood	Receiving	Jeff Caldwell	4 receptions, 50 yards
Tennessee Tech	Passing	Dylan Laible	13/20, 119 yards, 1 TD
Tennessee Tech	Rushing	Jalen Mitchell	13 carries, 128 yards, 1 TD
Tennessee Tech	Receiving	D.J. Linkins	4 receptions, 67 yards, 1 TD

=== No. 6 Southeast Missouri State ===
Game Eleven – No. 6 Southeast Missouri State Redhawks (8–1) vs Lindenwood Lions (4–6) – Game summary

Quarter	1	2	3	4	Total
No. 6 Redhawks	0	6	6	0	12
Lions	0	14	7	3	24

at Harlen C. Hunter Stadium • St. Charles, MO

- Date: Saturday November 9, 2024
- Game time: 1:30 p.m.
- Game weather: Rainy, 55 °F (13 °C)
- Game attendance: 5,108
- Referee: John Kellemeir
- TV announcers (ESPN+): TBD

Game information

First quarter

No scoring plays

Second quarter

- (13:13) SEMO – DC Pippin 39 yard field goal (Drive: 7 plays, 44 yards, 2:49; SEMO 3–0)
- (5:55) LIN – Drew Krobath 20 yard pass from Nate Glantz, Logan Seibert kick (Drive: 7 plays, 92 yards, 3:32; LIN 7–3)
- (3:07) SEMO – DC Pippin 47 yard field goal (Drive: 7 plays, 50 yards, 2:43; LIN 7–6)
- (0:13) LIN – Jeff Caldwell 3 yard pass from Nate Glantz, Logan Seibert kick (Drive: 8 plays, 75 yards, 2:54; LIN 14–6)

Third quarter

- (7:20) LIN – Nate Glantz 27 yard run, Logan Seibert kick (Drive: 3 plays, 52 yards, 0:56; LIN 21–6)
- (5:05) SEMO – Paxton DeLaurent 3 yard run (Drive: 3 plays, 37 yards, 0:29; LIN 21–12)

Fourth quarter

- (4:51) LIN – Logan Seibert 32 yard field goal (Drive: 5 plays, 5 yards, 2:45; LIN 24–12)

Statistics	SEMO	LIN
First downs	8	17
Total yards	234	375
Rushing yards	60	192
Passing yards	174	183
Passing: Comp–Att–Int	16–37–1	13–20–1
Time of possession	19:26	40:34

Team	Category	Player	Statistics
Southeast Missouri State	Passing	Paxton DeLaurent	16/37, 174 yards, 1 INT
Southeast Missouri State	Rushing	Darrell Smith	9 carries, 37 yards
Southeast Missouri State	Receiving	Tristan Smith	7 receptions, 64 yards
Lindenwood	Passing	Nate Glantz	13/20, 183 yards, 2 TD, 1 INT
Lindenwood	Rushing	Steve Hall	18 carries, 91 yards
Lindenwood	Receiving	Jeff Caldwell	6 receptions, 99 yards, 1 TD

=== at No. 22 UT Martin ===
Game Twelve – Lindenwood Lions (5–6) vs No. 22 UT Martin Skyhawks (7–4) – Game summary

Quarter	1	2	3	4	OT	Total
Lions	6	7	5	8	0	26
No. 22 Skyhawks	0	7	13	6	7	33

at Graham Stadium • Martin, TN

- Date: Saturday November 23, 2024
- Game time: 2:00 p.m.
- Game weather: Sunny, 52 °F (11 °C)
- Game attendance: 2,208
- Referee: Drew Myers
- TV announcers (ESPN+): Davis Gregory (play-by-play), John Hatler (analyst) and Chris Brinkley (sideline)

Game information

First quarter

- (10:39) LIN – Jeff Caldwell 21 yard run (Drive: 3 plays, 70 yards, 1:41; LIN 6–0)

Second quarter

- (11:40) LIN – Nate Glantz 2 yard run, Logan Seibert kick (Drive: 13 plays, 90 yards, 6:38; LIN 13–0)
- (2:35) UTM – Trevonte Rucker 23 yard pass from Kinkead Dent, Jaren Van Winkle kick (Drive: 7 plays, 95 yards, 3:46; LIN 13–7)

Third quarter

- (12:53) LIN – Logan Seibert 50 yard field goal (Drive: 5 plays, 43 yards, 2:03; LIN 16–7)
- (7:21) UTM – Trevonte Rucker 38 yard pass from Kinkead Dent, Jaren Van Winkle PAT blocked, returned for 2-point defensive conversion (Drive: 1 play, 38 yards, 0:07; LIN 18–13)
- (1:45) UTM – Patrick Smith 22 yard run, Jaren Van Winkle kick (Drive: 5 plays, 86 yards, 2:52; UTM 20–18)

Fourth quarter

- (10:45) UTM – Glover Cook III 2 yard run (Drive: 8 plays, 78 yards, 4:59; UTM 26–18)
- (0:32) LIN – Jared Rhodes 13 yard run, Nate Glantz pass to Jeff Caldwell for two-point conversion (Drive: 14 plays, 93 yards, 3:37; TIED 26–26)

Overtime

- UTM – Tyler Dostin 1 yard pass from Kinkead Dent, Jaren Van Winkle kick (Drive: 5 plays, 25 yards; UTM 33–26)

Statistics	LIN	UTM
First downs	21	20
Total yards	425	445
Rushing yards	98	173
Passing yards	327	272
Passing: Comp–Att–Int	27–45–2	18–27–1
Time of possession	30:44	29:16

Team	Category	Player	Statistics
Lindenwood	Passing	Nate Glantz	27/45, 327 yards, 2 INT
Lindenwood	Rushing	Nate Glantz	17 carries, 42 yards, 1 TD
Lindenwood	Receiving	Jeff Caldwell	7 receptions, 78 yards
UT Martin	Passing	Kinkead Dent	18/27, 272 yards, 3 TD, 1 INT
UT Martin	Rushing	Patrick Smith	15 carries, 80 yards, 1 TD
UT Martin	Receiving	Trevonte Rucker	5 receptions, 87 yards, 2 TD
