= 2024 Tennessee Tech Golden Eagles football team =

American college football season

2024 Tennessee Tech Golden Eagles football

Big South–OVC co-champion
- Conference: Big South–OVC football
- Record: 7–5 (6–2 Big South–OVC)
- Head coach: Bobby Wilder (1st season)
- Offensive coordinator: Brian Scott (1st season)
- Defensive coordinator: Greg Jones (1st season)
- Home stadium: Tucker Stadium

2024 Big South–OVC football standings
	Conf.			Overall
Team	W		L	W		L
No. 16 Southeast Missouri State +^	6	–	2	9	–	4
Tennessee Tech +	6	–	2	7	–	5
No. 17 UT Martin +^	6	–	2	9	–	5
No. 19 Tennessee State +^	6	–	2	9	–	4
Lindenwood*	4	–	4	5	–	7
Western Illinois	3	–	5	4	–	8
Gardner–Webb	3	–	5	4	–	8
Eastern Illinois	2	–	6	3	–	9
Charleston Southern	0	–	8	1	–	11
+ – Conference co-champions; ^ – FCS playoff participant; Note: Lindenwood ineligible for Big South–OVC title and FCS postseason play due to transition from NCAA Division II.; Rankings from STATS Poll

The 2024 Tennessee Tech Golden Eagles football team represented Tennessee Technological University as a member of the Big South–OVC Football Association during the 2024 NCAA Division I FCS football season. Led by first-year head coach Bobby Wilder, the Golden Eagles played home games at Tucker Stadium in Cookeville, Tennessee. This was the team's first winning season since 2011.

== Preseason ==
=== Preseason poll ===
The Big South-OVC Conference released their preseason poll on July 17, 2024. The Golden Eagles were picked to finish seventh in the conference.

=== Transfers ===
==== Outgoing ====
Player	Position	New school
O.J. Ross	RB	Arkansas-Pine Bluff
Justin Pegues	RB	Bowling Green
Jacquez McGowan	DB	Eastern Kentucky
Nick Bigelow	P	Gardner-Webb
Jyron Gilmore	DB	Georgia State
Jayvian Allen	RB	North Alabama
Bryce Phillips	DB	San Diego State
Ellis Adams	OL	Middle Tennessee
Wes Thompson	OL	East Mississippi CC
Gerald Kilgore	DB	South Carolina
Dominic Howard	DB	South Carolina State
Bradley Clark	WR	Southern Illinois
Jalal Dean	WR	Tennessee State
Hayes Gibson	QB	Valparaiso
Nyquan Washington	DB	Western Michigan
Leon Franklin	RB	Unknown
Brad Clark	WR	Unknown

==== Incoming ====
Player	Position	Previous school
James Edwards	DB	Appalachian State
Omari Philyaw	DB	Appalachian State
Kalvyn Crummie	LB	Army
La’Vario Wiley	DB	Central Michigan
Donnell Wilson	OL	Coastal Carolina
Kyron Cumby	RB	Delaware
Coby Walton	QB	Georgia Southern
Sean Pozniak	OL	Maine
Ty Moss	DB	Marshall
TJ Holmberg	OL	Marshall
Jalin Shephard	DB	Mississippi State
Dylan Laible	QB	Missouri
Caldra Williford	DB	Murray State
D.J. Linkins	WR	New Hampshire
Gio Hales	LB	Norfolk State
Obie Sanni	RB	Old Dominion
Jordan Yates	WR	Sam Houston
Taylor Love	LB	Tulane
Jalen Mitchell	RB	UConn
Jameson Wharton	DB	Vanderbilt
Luke Shields	WR	Virginia Tech
Jay Parker	WR	Western Illinois

== Schedule ==
Date	Time	Opponent	Site	TV	Result	Attendance
August 31	6:00 p.m.	at Middle Tennessee*	Johnny "Red" Floyd Stadium; Murfreesboro, TN	ESPN+	L 25–32	16,000
September 7	1:00 p.m.	at No. 1 (FBS) Georgia*	Sanford Stadium; Athens, GA	SECN+/ESPN+	L 3–48	93,033
September 21	1:30 p.m.	Tennessee State	Tucker Stadium; Cookeville, TN (Sgt. York Trophy)	ESPN+	W 24–14	8,019
September 28	3:00 p.m.	at Gardner–Webb	Ernest W. Spangler Stadium; Boiling Springs, NC	ESPN+	W 52–21	2,451
October 5	1:30 p.m.	South Carolina State*	Tucker Stadium; Cookeville, TN	ESPN+	L 20–22	5,974
October 12	3:00 p.m.	at No. 11 Southeast Missouri State	Houck Stadium; Cape Girardeau, MO	ESPN+	L 3–34	5,220
October 19	3:00 p.m.	at Western Illinois	Hanson Field; Macomb, IL	ESPN+	L 21–37	2,682
October 26	1:30 p.m.	Charleston Southern	Tucker Stadium; Cookeville, TN	ESPN+	W 28–23	5,498
November 2	1:30 p.m.	Lindenwood^{†}	Tucker Stadium; Cookeville, TN	ESPN+	W 52–10	8,144
November 9	2:00 p.m.	at Samford*	Pete Hanna Stadium; Homewood, AL	ESPN+	W 27–7	3,013
November 16	1:00 p.m.	No. 18 UT Martin	Graham Stadium; Martin, TN (Sgt. York Trophy)	ESPN+	W 10–9	2,914
November 23	12:00 p.m.	Eastern Illinois	Tucker Stadium; Cookeville, TN	ESPN+	W 23–6	6,790
*Non-conference game; ^{†}Homecoming; Rankings from STATS Poll released prior to the game; All times are in Central time

== Game summaries ==
=== at Middle Tennessee (FBS) ===
Game One – Tennessee Tech Golden Eagles (0–0) vs Middle Tennessee Blue Raiders (FBS) (0–0) – Game summary

Quarter	1	2	3	4	Total
Golden Eagles	0	5	6	14	25
Blue Raiders (FBS)	7	14	0	11	32

at Johnny "Red" Floyd Stadium • Murfreesboro, TN

- Date: Saturday August 31, 2024
- Game time: 6:00 p.m.
- Game weather: Rain, 72 °F (22 °C)
- Game attendance: 16,000
- Referee: Ron Hudson
- TV announcers (ESPN+): Jake Rose, Jeremy Kellem, Justin Beasley

Game information

First quarter
Second quarter
Third quarter
Fourth quarter

Statistics	TNTC	MTSU
First downs	21	20
Total yards	341	328
Rushing yards	67	118
Passing yards	274	210
Passing: Comp–Att–Int	29–45–1	20–35–1
Time of possession	27:09	32:51

Team	Category	Player	Statistics
Tennessee Tech	Passing	Jordyn Potts	27/38, 256 yds, 3 TD
Tennessee Tech	Rushing	Jalen Mitchell	11 carries, 52 yards
Tennessee Tech	Receiving	D.J. Linkins	7 receptions, 61 yards
Middle Tennessee	Passing	Nicholas Vattiato	20/35, 210 yds, 2 TD
Middle Tennessee	Rushing	Frank Peasant	10 carries, 49 yards, 2 TD
Middle Tennessee	Receiving	Omari Kelly	4 receptions, 47 yards

=== at No. 1 (FBS) Georgia ===
Game Two – Tennessee Tech Golden Eagles (0–1) vs No. 1 (FBS) Georgia Bulldogs (1–0) – Game summary

Quarter	1	2	3	4	Total
Golden Eagles	0	0	0	3	3
No. 1 (FBS) Bulldogs	14	10	21	3	48

at Sanford Stadium • Athens, GA

- Date: Saturday September 7, 2024
- Game time: 1:00 p.m.
- Game weather: Sunny • Temperature: 85 °F (29 °C) • Wind: W at 5 miles per hour (8.0 km/h)
- Game attendance: 93,033
- Referee: Marc Curles
- TV announcers (SECN+/ESPN+): Jay Alter (play-by-play), Rocky Boiman (analyst), and Ashley Stroehlein (sideline reporter)

Game information

First quarter

- (12:27) Georgia - Dillon Bell 22-yard pass from Carson Beck (Peyton Woodring kick) (Drive: 1 play, 22 yards, 0:06; Georgia 7–0)
- (6:37) Georgia - Colbie Young 7-yard pass from Carson Beck (Peyton Woodring kick) (Drive: 7 plays, 58 yards, 3:44; Georgia 14–0)

Second quarter

- (11:45) Georgia - Peyton Woodring 27-yard field goal (Drive: 14 plays, 71 yards, 5:07; Georgia 17–0)
- (1:11) Georgia - Dominic Lovett 10-yard pass from Carson Beck (Peyton Woodring kick) (Drive: 7 plays, 80 yards, 3:12; Georgia 24–0)

Third quarter

- (12:54) Georgia - Arian Smith 50-yard pass from Carson Beck (Peyton Woodring kick) (Drive: 5 plays, 75 yards, 2:06; Georgia 31–0)
- (12:21) Georgia - Lawson Luckie 37-yard pass from Carson Beck (Peyton Woodring kick) (Drive: 1 play, 27 yards, 0:23; Georgia 38–0)
- (6:46) Georgia - Branson Robinson 10-yard rush (Peyton Woodring kick) (Drive: 10 plays, 69 yards, 4:34; Georgia 45–0)

Fourth quarter

- (3:07) Georgia - Peyton Woodring 32-yard field goal (Drive: 7 plays, 37 yards, 2:49; Georgia 48–0)
- (0:00) Tennessee Tech - Hayden Olsen 32-yard field goal (Drive: 7 plays, 60 yards, 3:07; Georgia 48–3)

Statistics	TNTC	UGA
First downs	9	27
Total yards	134	498
Rushing yards	116	166
Passing yards	18	332
Passing: Comp–Att–Int	5–8–0	28–37–0
Time of possession	28:35	31:25

Team	Category	Player	Statistics
Tennessee Tech	Passing	Jordyn Potts	5/8, 18 yards
Tennessee Tech	Rushing	Aidan Littles	6 carries, 45 yards
Tennessee Tech	Receiving	D.J. Linkins	1 reception, 12 yards
Georgia	Passing	Carson Beck	18/25, 242 yards, 5 TD
Georgia	Rushing	Trevor Etienne	5 carries, 78 yards
Georgia	Receiving	Arian Smith	4 receptions, 73 yards, 1 TD

=== Tennessee State ===
Game Three – Tennessee State Tigers (2–1) vs Tennessee Tech Golden Eagles (0–2) – Game summary

Quarter	1	2	3	4	Total
Tigers	0	14	0	0	14
Golden Eagles	14	0	3	7	24

at Tucker Stadium • Cookeville, TN

- Date: September 21, 2024
- Game time: 1:30 p.m.
- Game weather: Cloudy, 88 °F (31 °C)
- Game attendance: 8,019
- Referee: Branden McCain
- TV announcers (ESPN+): Dylan Vazzano, Sam Brooks

Game information

First quarter
Second quarter
Third quarter
Fourth quarter

Statistics	TNST	TNTC
First downs	14	15
Total yards	246	314
Rushing yards	0	220
Passing yards	246	94
Passing: Comp–Att–Int	22–39–2	12–25–1
Time of possession	30:00	30:00

Team	Category	Player	Statistics
Tennessee State	Passing	Draylen Ellis	22/39, 246 yds, 1 TD, 2 INT
Tennessee State	Rushing	CJ Evans	6 carries, 14 yards
Tennessee State	Receiving	Karate Brenson	9 receptions, 99 yards
Tennessee Tech	Passing	Jordyn Potts	12/25, 94 yds, 1 INT
Tennessee Tech	Rushing	Obie Sanni	6 carries, 75 yards, 1 TD
Tennessee Tech	Receiving	D.J. Linkins	4 receptions, 39 yards

=== at Gardner–Webb ===
Game Four – Tennessee Tech Golden Eagles (1–2) vs Gardner–Webb Runnin' Bulldogs (1–3) – Game summary

Quarter	1	2	3	4	Total
Golden Eagles	7	17	21	7	52
Runnin' Bulldogs	0	7	0	14	21

at Ernest W. Spangler Stadium • Boiling Springs, NC

- Date: Saturday September 28, 2024
- Game time: 3:00 p.m.
- Game weather: Sunny, 75 °F (24 °C)
- Game attendance: 2,451
- Referee: Gabe Tomlin
- TV announcers (ESPN+): Phil Constantino, Matt Covert

Game information

First quarter
Second quarter
Third quarter
Fourth quarter

Statistics	TNTC	GWEB
First downs	21	22
Total yards	414	329
Rushing yards	340	103
Passing yards	74	226
Passing: Comp–Att–Int	5–10–0	27–41–2
Time of possession	24:42	31:21

Team	Category	Player	Statistics
Tennessee Tech	Passing	Jordyn Potts	5/10, 74 yds, 1 TD
Tennessee Tech	Rushing	Aidan Littles	10 carries, 118 yards, 1 TD
Tennessee Tech	Receiving	D.J. Linkins	2 receptions, 48 yards, 1 TD
Gardner–Webb	Passing	Ren Hefley	13/20, 116 yds, 1 TD, 1 INT
Gardner–Webb	Rushing	Carson Gresock	13 carries, 86 yards, 1 TD
Gardner–Webb	Receiving	Jordan Bly	6 receptions, 6 yards, 1 TD

=== South Carolina State ===
Game Five – South Carolina State Bulldogs (2–2) vs Tennessee Tech Golden Eagles (2–2) – Game summary

Quarter	1	2	3	4	Total
Bulldogs	13	6	3	0	22
Golden Eagles	0	13	7	0	20

at Tucker Stadium • Cookeville, TN

- Date: Saturday October 5, 2024
- Game time: 1:30 p.m.
- Game weather: Sunny, 75 °F (24 °C)
- Game attendance: 5,974
- Referee: Michael Lennie
- TV announcers (ESPN+): Dylan Vazzano, Sam Brooks

Game information

First quarter
Second quarter
Third quarter
Fourth quarter

Statistics	SCST	TNTC
First downs	16	21
Total yards	465	391
Rushing yards	53	95
Passing yards	412	296
Passing: Comp–Att–Int	17–31–2	23–43–2
Time of possession	27:27	32:33

Team	Category	Player	Statistics
South Carolina State	Passing	Eric Phoenix	17/31, 412 yds, 3 TD, 2 INT
South Carolina State	Rushing	Deondra Duehart	13 carries, 30 yards
South Carolina State	Receiving	Caden High	7 receptions, 150 yards
Tennessee Tech	Passing	Jordyn Potts	22/42, 300 yds, 2 TD, 2 INT
Tennessee Tech	Rushing	Jalen Mitchell	12 carries, 36 yards
Tennessee Tech	Receiving	Jay Parker	3 receptions, 80 yards, 1 TD

=== at No. 11 Southeast Missouri State ===
Game Six – Tennessee Tech Golden Eagles (2–3) vs No. 11 Southeast Missouri State Redhawks (5–1) – Game summary

Quarter	1	2	3	4	Total
Golden Eagles	0	0	3	0	3
No. 11 Redhawks	0	10	7	17	34

at Houck Stadium • Cape Girardeau, MO

- Date: Saturday October 12, 2024
- Game time: 3:00 p.m.
- Game weather: Sunny, 80 °F (27 °C)
- Game attendance: 5,220
- Referee: Zach Erdmann
- TV announcers (ESPN+): Erik Sean, Rick Wieser

Game information

First quarter

No scoring plays

Second quarter

- (6:45) SEMO – DC Pippin 24 yard field goal (Drive: 10 plays, 74 yards, 5:06; SEMO 3–0)
- (4:36) SEMO – Tristan Smith 13 yard pass from Paxton DeLaurent, DC Pippin kick (Drive: 3 plays, 62 yards, 1:15; SEMO 10–0)

Third quarter

- (8:41) TNTC – Dom LeBlanc 43 yard field goal (Drive: 14 plays, 63 yards, 6:15; SEMO 10–3)
- (5:22) SEMO – Cam Pedro 46 yard pass from Paxton DeLaurent, DC Pippin kick (Drive: 7 plays, 75 yards, 3:19; SEMO 17–3)

Fourth quarter

- (13:42) SEMO – Mitchell Sellers 31 yard pass from Paxton DeLaurent, DC Pippin kick (Drive: 2 plays, 23 yards, 0:41; SEMO 24–3)
- (9:23) SEMO – Dorian Anderson 5 yard pass from Paxton DeLaurent, DC Pippin kick (Drive: 6 plays, 41 yards, 2:49; SEMO 31–3)
- (0:27) SEMO – DC Pippin 35 yard field goal (Drive: 7 plays, 7 yards, 3:45; SEMO 34–3)

Statistics	TNTC	SEMO
First downs	20	23
Total yards	265	455
Rushing yards	34	37
Passing yards	231	418
Passing: Comp–Att–Int	26-47-2	34-46-2
Time of possession	30:29	29:31

Team	Category	Player	Statistics
Tennessee Tech	Passing	Jordyn Potts	26/47, 231 yards, 2 INT
Tennessee Tech	Rushing	Jalen Mitchell	10 carries, 25 yards
Tennessee Tech	Receiving	D.J. Linkins	7 receptions, 90 yards
Southeast Missouri State	Passing	Paxton DeLaurent	34/46, 418 yards, 4 TD, 2 INT
Southeast Missouri State	Rushing	Cole Ruble	10 carries, 31 yards
Southeast Missouri State	Receiving	Cam Pedro	6 receptions, 111 yards

=== at Western Illinois ===
Game Seven – Tennessee Tech Golden Eagles (2–4) vs Western Illinois Leathernecks (2–4) – Game summary

Quarter	1	2	3	4	Total
Golden Eagles	7	7	0	7	21
Leathernecks	10	21	3	3	37

at Hanson Field • Macomb, IL

- Date: Saturday October 19, 2024
- Game time: 3:00 p.m.
- Game weather: Sunny, 75 °F (24 °C)
- Game attendance: 2,682
- Referee: Brad Carre
- TV announcers (ESPN+): Russ Eisenstein, Cannon Wynkoop, Caden Kratz

Game information

First quarter
Second quarter
Third quarter
Fourth quarter

Statistics	TNTC	WIU
First downs	17	26
Total yards	330	446
Rushing yards	68	186
Passing yards	262	260
Passing: Comp–Att–Int	23–34–2	15–24–0
Time of possession	22:13	37:47

Team	Category	Player	Statistics
Tennessee Tech	Passing	Dylan Laible	23/33, 262 yds, 1 TD, 2 INT
Tennessee Tech	Rushing	Jalen Mitchell	7 carries, 86 yards, 2 TD
Tennessee Tech	Receiving	D.J. Linkins	7 receptions, 84 yards
Western Illinois	Passing	Nathan Lamb	15/24, 260 yds, 2 TD
Western Illinois	Rushing	Nathan Lamb	17 carries, 90 yards, 1 TD
Western Illinois	Receiving	Matthew Henry	6 receptions, 181 yards, 1 TD

=== Charleston Southern ===
Game Eight – Charleston Southern Buccaneers (1–6) vs Tennessee Tech Golden Eagles (2–5) – Game summary

Quarter	1	2	3	4	Total
Buccaneers	7	0	14	2	23
Golden Eagles	3	16	0	9	28

at Tucker Stadium • Cookeville, TN

- Date: Saturday October 26, 2024
- Game time: 1:30 p.m.
- Game weather: Cloudy, 72 °F (22 °C)
- Game attendance: 5,498
- Referee: Zach Erdmann
- TV announcers (ESPN+): Dylan Vazzano, Sam Brooks

Game information

First quarter
Second quarter
Third quarter
Fourth quarter

Statistics	CHSO	TNTC
First downs	15	16
Total yards	335	343
Rushing yards	122	168
Passing yards	213	175
Passing: Comp–Att–Int	14–29–2	9–16–0
Time of possession	31:25	28:35

Team	Category	Player	Statistics
Charleston Southern	Passing	Kaleb Jackson	14/29, 213 yds, 1 TD, 2 INT
Charleston Southern	Rushing	Tyson Greenwade	24 carries, 95 yards, 1 TD
Charleston Southern	Receiving	Chris Rhone	3 receptions, 129 yards, 1 TD
Tennessee Tech	Passing	Dylan Laible	9/16, 175 yds, 2 TD
Tennessee Tech	Rushing	Jalen Mitchell	15 carries, 94 yards
Tennessee Tech	Receiving	D.J. Linkins	3 receptions, 106 yards, 1 TD

=== Lindenwood ===
Game Nine – Lindenwood Lions (4–5) vs Tennessee Tech Golden Eagles (3–5) – Game summary

Quarter	1	2	3	4	Total
Lions	0	0	7	3	10
Golden Eagles	7	10	28	7	52

at Tucker Stadium • Cookeville, TN

- Date: Saturday November 2, 2024
- Game time: 1:30 p.m.
- Game weather: Sunny, 71 °F (22 °C)
- Game attendance: 8,144
- Referee: Drew Myers
- TV announcers (ESPN+): Dylan Vazzano, Sam Brooks

Game information

First quarter

- (7:32) TNTC – Jalen Mitchell 35 yard run, Dom LeBlanc kick (Drive: 7 plays, 69 yards, 3:55; TNTC 7–0)

Second quarter

- (10:37) TNTC – Dom LeBlanc 22 yard field goal (Drive: 18 plays, 93 yards, 8:32; TNTC 10–0)
- (2:56) TNTC – D.J. Linkins 31 yard pass from Dylan Laible, Dom LeBlanc kick (Drive: 4 plays, 44 yards, 2:21; TNTC 17–0)

Third quarter

- (12:59) TNTC – Aidan Littles 22 yard run, Dom LeBlanc kick (Drive: 4 plays, 75 yards, 2:01; TNTC 24–0)
- (12:52) TNTC – Cayman Spaulding 29 yard interception return, Dom LeBlanc kick (Drive: 1 play, 0 yards, 0:07; TNTC 31–0)
- (8:32) LIN – Darrin Fugitt 23 yard pass from Nate Glantz, Logan Seibert kick (Drive: 10 plays, 75 yards, 4:20; TNTC 31–7)
- (4:17) TNTC – Tyler Wilson 22 yard run, Dom LeBlanc kick (Drive: 8 plays, 75 yards, 4:15; TNTC 38–7)
- (0:13) TNTC – Jordan Yates 10 yard run, Dom LeBlanc kick (Drive: 4 plays, 31 yards, 2:10; TNTC 45–7)

Fourth quarter

- (9:18) LIN – Logan Seibert 21 yard field goal (Drive: 16 plays, 69 yards, 5:55; TNTC 45–10)
- (8:37) TNTC – Torin Baker 67 yard run, Dom LeBlanc kick (Drive: 2 plays, 75 yards, 0:41; TNTC 52–10)

Statistics	LIN	TNTC
First downs	17	24
Total yards	249	519
Rushing yards	68	400
Passing yards	181	119
Passing: Comp–Att–Int	17–28–1	13–20–0
Time of possession	29:19	30:41

Team	Category	Player	Statistics
Lindenwood	Passing	Nate Glantz	17/27, 181 yards, 1 TD, 1 INT
Lindenwood	Rushing	Robert Giaimo	10 carries, 44 yards
Lindenwood	Receiving	Jeff Caldwell	4 receptions, 50 yards
Tennessee Tech	Passing	Dylan Laible	13/20, 119 yards, 1 TD
Tennessee Tech	Rushing	Jalen Mitchell	13 carries, 128 yards, 1 TD
Tennessee Tech	Receiving	D.J. Linkins	4 receptions, 67 yards, 1 TD

=== at Samford ===
Game Ten – Tennessee Tech Golden Eagles (4–5) vs Samford Bulldogs (3–5) – Game summary

Quarter	1	2	3	4	Total
Golden Eagles	0	0	20	7	27
Bulldogs	0	0	0	7	7

at Pete Hanna Stadium • Homewood, AL

- Date: Saturday November 9, 2024
- Game time: 2:00 p.m.
- Game weather: Rain, 78 °F (26 °C)
- Game attendance: 3,013
- Referee: Jake Grombach
- TV announcers (ESPN+): Eli Gold, Damian Mitchell, Lynden Blake

Game information

First quarter
Second quarter
Third quarter
Fourth quarter

Statistics	TNTC	SAM
First downs	15	8
Total yards	283	184
Rushing yards	160	19
Passing yards	123	165
Passing: Comp–Att–Int	13–26–0	22–33–1
Time of possession	33:09	26:51

Team	Category	Player	Statistics
Tennessee Tech	Passing	Dylan Laible	13/26, 123 yds
Tennessee Tech	Rushing	Tremel Jones	1 carry, 79 yards, 1 TD
Tennessee Tech	Receiving	Tremel Jones	2 receptions, 37 yards
Samford	Passing	Quincy Crittendon	22/32, 165 yds, 1 TD, 1 INT
Samford	Rushing	Damonta Witherspoon	7 carries, 17 yards
Samford	Receiving	D.J. Rias	4 receptions, 78 yards, 1 TD

=== at No. 18 UT Martin ===
Game Eleven – Tennessee Tech Golden Eagles (5–5) vs No. 18 UT Martin Skyhawks (7–3) – Game summary

Quarter	1	2	3	4	Total
Golden Eagles	10	0	0	0	10
No. 18 Skyhawks	0	0	0	9	9

at Graham Stadium • Martin, TN

- Date: Saturday November 16, 2024
- Game time: 1:00 p.m.
- Game weather: Sunny, 63 °F (17 °C)
- Game attendance: 2,914
- Referee: Michael Lennie
- TV announcers (ESPN+): Davis Gregory, John Hatler, Chris Brinkley

Game information

First quarter

- (10:01) TNTC – Jalen Mitchell 15 yard run, Dom LeBlanc kick (Drive: 8 plays, 64 yards, 4:06; TNTC 7–0)
- (7:12) TNTC – Dom LeBlanc 24 yard field goal (Drive: 4 plays, 3 yards, 1:30; TNTC 10–0)

Second quarter

No scoring plays

Third quarter

No scoring plays

Fourth quarter

- (8:07) UTM – Cam Robertson 40 yard return of blocked punt, Jaren Van Winkle kick (Drive: 3 plays, 2 yards, 2:23; TNTC 10–7)
- (0:14) UTM – Spencer Ashby -21 yard run for a safety (Drive: 4 plays, 1 yard, 0:16; TNTC 10–9)

Statistics	TNTC	UTM
First downs	13	9
Total yards	247	185
Rushing yards	107	43
Passing yards	140	142
Passing: Comp–Att–Int	16–31–1	13–32–2
Time of possession	33:14	26:46

Team	Category	Player	Statistics
Tennessee Tech	Passing	Dylan Laible	15/29, 128 yds, 1 INT
Tennessee Tech	Rushing	Jalen Mitchell	11 carries, 62 yards, 1 TD
Tennessee Tech	Receiving	D.J. Linkins	3 receptions, 56 yards
UT Martin	Passing	Kinkead Dent	13/32, 142 yds, 2 INT
UT Martin	Rushing	Kinkead Dent	13 carries, 20 yards
UT Martin	Receiving	Trevonte Rucker	2 receptions, 51 yards

=== Eastern Illinois ===
Game Twelve – Eastern Illinois Panthers (3–8) vs Tennessee Tech Golden Eagles (6–5) – Game summary

Quarter	1	2	3	4	Total
Panthers	0	0	6	0	6
Golden Eagles	3	10	3	7	23

at Tucker Stadium • Cookeville, TN

- Date: Saturday November 23, 2024
- Game time: 12:00 p.m.
- Game weather: Sunny, 49 °F (9 °C)
- Game attendance: 6,790
- Referee: Gabriel Tomlin
- TV announcers (ESPN+): Dylan Vazzano, Sam Brooks

Game information

First quarter

- (12:14) TNTC – Dom LeBlanc 46 yard field goal (Drive: 6 plays, 27 yards, 2:30; TNTC 3–0)

Second quarter

- (12:33) TNTC – Dom LeBlanc 20 yard field goal (Drive: 4 plays, 1 yard, 1:25; TNTC 6–0)
- (3:49) TNTC – Jordan Yates 9 yard run, Dom LeBlanc kick (Drive: 9 plays, 80 yards, 5:05; TNTC 13–0)

Third quarter

- (7:37) TNTC – Dom LeBlanc 22 yard field goal (Drive: 8 plays, 24 yards, 2:38; TNTC 16–0)
- (2:15) EIU – Jay Pearson 2 yard run (Drive: 10 plays, 75 yards, 5:22; TNTC 16–6)

Fourth quarter

- (11:04) TNTC – Tyler Wilson 9 yard run, Dom LeBlanc kick (Drive: 2 plays, 30 yards, 0:40; TNTC 23–6)

Statistics	EIU	TNTC
First downs	18	17
Total yards	241	328
Rushing yards	80	200
Passing yards	161	128
Passing: Comp–Att–Int	18–28–1	11–20–0
Time of possession	30:23	29:37

Team	Category	Player	Statistics
Eastern Illinois	Passing	Pierce Holley	14/20, 129 yards
Eastern Illinois	Rushing	Jay Pearson	11 carries, 69 yards, 1 TD
Eastern Illinois	Receiving	Cooper Willman	9 receptions, 86 yards
Tennessee Tech	Passing	Dylan Laible	9/16, 88 yards
Tennessee Tech	Rushing	Jalen Mitchell	20 carries, 131 yards
Tennessee Tech	Receiving	Torin Baker	3 receptions, 49 yards
