= 2024 Southeast Missouri State Redhawks football team =

American college football season

2024 Southeast Missouri State Redhawks football

Big South–OVC co-champion

NCAA Division I First Round, L 25–37 vs. Illinois State
- Conference: Big South–OVC football

Ranking
- STATS: No. 16
- FCS Coaches: No. 17
- Record: 9–4 (6–2 Big South–OVC)
- Head coach: Tom Matukewicz (11th season)
- Offensive coordinator: Jeromy McDowell (7th season)
- Defensive coordinator: Ricky Coon (3rd season)
- Home stadium: Houck Stadium

2024 Big South–OVC football standings
	Conf.			Overall
Team	W		L	W		L
No. 16 Southeast Missouri State +^	6	–	2	9	–	4
Tennessee Tech +	6	–	2	7	–	5
No. 17 UT Martin +^	6	–	2	9	–	5
No. 19 Tennessee State +^	6	–	2	9	–	4
Lindenwood*	4	–	4	5	–	7
Western Illinois	3	–	5	4	–	8
Gardner–Webb	3	–	5	4	–	8
Eastern Illinois	2	–	6	3	–	9
Charleston Southern	0	–	8	1	–	11
+ – Conference co-champions; ^ – FCS playoff participant; Note: Lindenwood ineligible for Big South–OVC title and FCS postseason play due to transition from NCAA Division II.; Rankings from STATS Poll

The 2024 Southeast Missouri State Redhawks football team represented Southeast Missouri State University (SEMO) as a member of the Big South–OVC Football Association during the 2024 NCAA Division I FCS football season. Led by 11th-year head coach Tom Matukewicz, the Redhawks played their home games at Houck Stadium in Cape Girardeau, Missouri.

== Preseason ==
=== Preseason poll ===
The Big South-OVC Conference released their preseason poll on July 17, 2024. The Redhawks were picked to finish third in the conference.

=== Transfers ===
==== Outgoing ====
Player	Position	New school
Joel Logan	DL	Alabama A&M
Josh Jackson	QB	Central Connecticut
Harris Adams	DL	Cincinnati
Henry Pickens III	DB	Duquesne
Christian Fuhrman	LB	Northern Illinois
Jenson Walker	LS	North Texas
Joe Bowman	K	UTEP
Christian Fuhrman	LB	Unknown
Camani Cobbs	DB	Unknown

==== Incoming ====
Player	Position	Previous school
Tony Terry	OLB	Kansas
Cam Pedro	WR	Marshall
Zyier Thornton	LB	New Mexico State
Jared Pedraza	LB	Northwestern State
Jalen Nettles	OL	UAB

== Schedule ==
Date	Time	Opponent	Rank	Site	TV	Result	Attendance
August 24	6:00 p.m.	vs. North Alabama*		Cramton Bowl; Montgomery, AL (FCS Kickoff)	ESPN	W 37–15	4,358
August 31	8:00 p.m.	at New Mexico State*		Aggie Memorial Stadium; Las Cruces, NM	TruTV	L 16–23	10,738
September 7	6:00 p.m.	UT Martin		Houck Stadium; Cape Girardeau, MO	ESPN+	W 45–42 ^{2OT}	6,127
September 21	6:00 p.m.	at No. 7 Southern Illinois*	No. 21	Saluki Stadium; Carbondale, IL	ESPN+	W 38–21	13,421
September 28	3:00 p.m.	Northwestern State*	No. 13	Houck Stadium; Cape Girardeau, MO	ESPN+	W 19–0	N/A
October 5	2:00 p.m.	at Eastern Illinois	No. 13	O'Brien Field; Charleston, IL	ESPN+	W 38–27	7,777
October 12	3:00 p.m.	Tennessee Tech	No. 11	Houck Stadium; Cape Girardeau, MO	ESPN+	W 34–3	5,220
October 19	3:00 p.m.	at Charleston Southern	No. 8	Buccaneer Field; North Charleston, SC	ESPN+	W 26–13	3,105
October 26	2:00 p.m.	Gardner–Webb^{†}	No. 6	Houck Stadium; Cape Girardeau, MO	ESPN+	W 30–24	7,295
November 9	1:00 p.m.	at Lindenwood	No. 6	Harlen C. Hunter Stadium; St. Charles, MO	ESPN+	L 12–24	5,108
November 16	1:00 p.m.	Western Illinois	No. 12	Houck Stadium; Cape Girardeau, MO	ESPN+	W 54–45	4,839
November 23	3:30 p.m.	at Tennessee State	No. 12	Nissan Stadium; Nashville, TN	ESPN+	L 21–28	1,536
November 30	11:00 a.m.	No. 11 Illinois State*	No. 16	Houck Stadium; Cape Girardeau, MO (NCAA Division I First Round)	ESPN+	L 27–35	
*Non-conference game; ^{†}Homecoming; Rankings from STATS Poll released prior to the game; All times are in Central time

== Game summaries ==
=== vs. North Alabama ===
Game One – North Alabama Lions (0–0) vs. Southeast Missouri State Redhawks (0–0) – Game summary

Quarter	1	2	3	4	Total
Lions	8	7	0	0	15
Redhawks	7	6	8	16	37

at Cramton Bowl • Montgomery, Alabama

- Date: August 24
- Game time: 6:00 p.m. CDT
- Game weather: Wind: SW at 8 miles per hour (13 km/h) • Weather: Sunny • Temp: 89 °F (32 °C)
- Game attendance: 4,358
- Referee: Brad Carrell
- TV announcers (ESPN): Jay Alter (play-by-play) and Rocky Boiman (analyst)

Game information

First quarter

- (7:13) SEMO – Cam Pedro 4-yard pass from Paxton DeLaurent (DC Pippin kick) (Drive: 12 plays, 57 yards, 4:28; SEMO 7-0)
- (1:22) UNA – Jayvian Allen 3-yard run (Ben Harris pass to Tanaka Scott) (Drive: 7 plays, 85 yards, 3:47; UNA 8-7)

Second quarter

- (4:11) UNA – Ari Patu 11-yard run (Sam Contorno kick) (Drive: 5 plays, 61 yards, 1:49; UNA 15-7)
- (0:18) SEMO – Payton Brown 1-yard run (Two-point conversion no-good) (Drive: 10 plays, 46 yards, 3:53; UNA 15-13)

Third quarter

- (0:15) SEMO – Payton Brown 25-yard run (Brandon Epton Jr run) (Drive: 9 plays, 73 yards, 4:26; SEMO 21-15)

Fourth quarter

- (7:13) SEMO – Payton Brown 1-yard run (Two-point conversion no-good) (Drive: 9 plays, 73 yards, 4:26; SEMO 27-15)
- (5:32) SEMO – Carter Hensley 1-yard run (DC Pippin kick) (Drive: 3 plays, 19 yards, 1:21; SEMO 34-15)
- (2:43) SEMO – DC Pippin 41-yard field goal (Drive: 4 plays, 7 yards, 2:19; SEMO 37-15)

Statistics	UNA	SEMO
First downs	16	23
Total yards	320	372
Rushing yards	216	176
Passing yards	104	196
Passing: Comp–Att–Int	12-24-2	24-31
Turnovers	4	1
Time of possession	23:21	36:39

Team	Category	Player	Statistics
North Alabama	Passing	Ari Patu	12/24, 104 yards, 2 INT
North Alabama	Rushing	Jayvian Allen	13 carries, 100 yards, TD
North Alabama	Receiving	Kobe Warden	5 receptions, 50 yards
Southeast Missouri State	Passing	Carter Hensley	10/14, 100 yards
Southeast Missouri State	Rushing	Payton Brown	19 carries, 97 yards, 3 TD
Southeast Missouri State	Receiving	Dorian Anderson	5 receptions, 71 yards

=== at New Mexico State (FBS) ===
Game Two – Southeast Missouri State Redhawks (1–0) at New Mexico State Aggies (FBS) (0–0) – Game summary

Quarter	1	2	3	4	Total
Redhawks	7	3	3	3	16
Aggies (FBS)	0	10	0	13	23

at Aggie Memorial Stadium • Las Cruces, NM

- Date: Saturday August 31, 2024
- Game time: 8:00 p.m.
- Game weather: Sunny, 90 °F (32 °C)
- Game attendance: 10,738
- Referee: Garrett Dickerson
- TV announcers (TruTV): J.B. Long (play-by-play) and Mike Golic, Jr. (analyst)

Game information

First quarter

- (2:03) SEMO – Dorian Anderson 51 yard pass from Paxton DeLaurent, DC Pippin kick (Drive: 7 plays, 80 yards, 2:45; SEMO 7–0)

Second quarter

- (11:04) NMSU – Seth McGowan 14 yard run, Abraham Montano kick (Drive: 13 plays, 75 yards, 5:59; TIED 7–7)
- (7:08) SEMO – DC Pippin 37 yard field goal (Drive: 9 plays, 56 yards, 3:56; SEMO 10–7)
- (0:40) NMSU – Abraham Montano 24 yard field goal (Drive: 16 plays, 72 yards, 6:21; TIED 10–10)

Third quarter

- (9:22) SEMO – DC Pippin 53 yard field goal (Drive: 7 plays, 25 yards, 1:46; SEMO 13–10)

Fourth quarter

- (14:56) SEMO – DC Pippin 48 yard field goal (Drive: 7 plays, 19 yards, 2:36; SEMO 16–10)
- (11:44) NMSU – Team Safety (SEMO 16–12)
- (6:07) NMSU – Abraham Montano 51 yard field goal (Drive: 9 plays, 36 yards, 7:31; SEMO 16–15)
- (1:57) NMSU – Seth McGowan 3 yard run, Parker Awad Run for Two-Point Conversion (Drive: 6 plays, 34 yards, 2:12; NMSU 23–16)

Statistics	SEMO	NMSU
First downs	15	20
Total yards	352	270
Rushing yards	57	210
Passing yards	295	60
Passing: Comp–Att–Int	27–45–1	7–23–1
Time of possession	37:24	33:36

Team	Category	Player	Statistics
Southeast Missouri State	Passing	Paxton DeLaurent	27/45, 295 yards, 1 TD, 1 INT
Southeast Missouri State	Rushing	Steven Lewis	1 carry, 27 yards
Southeast Missouri State	Receiving	Dorian Anderson	6 receptions, 115 yards, 1 TD
New Mexico State	Passing	Parker Awad	5/18, 37 yards, 1 INT
New Mexico State	Rushing	Seth McGowan	11 carries, 87 yards, 2 TD
New Mexico State	Receiving	PJ Johnson III	2 receptions, 35 yards

=== vs. UT Martin ===
Game Three – UT Martin Skyhawks (0–1) at Southeast Missouri State Redhawks (1–1) – Game summary

Quarter	1	2	3	4	OT	2OT	Total
Skyhawks	0	14	14	7	7	0	42
Redhawks	7	7	7	14	7	3	45

at Houck Stadium • Cape Girardeau, MO

- Date: Saturday September 7, 2024
- Game time: 6:00 p.m.
- Game weather: Sunny, 72 °F (22 °C)
- Game attendance: 6,127
- Referee: Branden McCain
- TV announcers (ESPN+): TBD

Game information

First quarter

- (4:42) SEMO – Tristan Smith 17 yard pass from Paxton DeLaurent, DC Pippin kick (Drive: 3 plays, 36 yards, 1:37; SEMO 0–7)

Second quarter

- (8:14) UTM – Trevonte Rucker 20 yard pass from Kinkead Dent, Jaren Van Winkle kick (Drive: 7 plays, 47 yards, 3:46; TIED 7–7)
- (3:31) UTM – Trevonte Rucker 3 yard pass from Kinkead Dent, Jaren Van Winkle kick (Drive: 7 plays, 55 yards, 3:29; UTM 14–7)
- (1:40) SEMO – Dorian Anderson 18 yard pass from Paxton DeLaurent, DC Pippin kick (Drive: 6 plays, 75 yards, 1:51; TIED 14–14)

Third quarter

- (12:00) SEMO – Dorian Anderson 20 yard pass from Paxton DeLaurent, DC Pippin kick (Drive: 8 plays, 70 yards, 2:56; SEMO 14–21)
- (7:16) UTM – Tyler Dostin 24 yard pass from Kinkead Dent, Jaren Van Winkle kick (Drive: 8 plays, 75 yards, 4:44; TIED 21–21)
- (3:59) UTM – Patrick Smith 29 yard run, Jaren Van Winkle kick (Drive: 4 plays, 43 yards, 1:32; UTM 28–21)

Fourth quarter

- (12:35) UTM – Rashad Raymond 1 yard run, Jaren Van Winkle kick (Drive: 9 plays, 90 yards, 4:21; UTM 35–21)
- (8:30) SEMO – Mitchell Sellers 5 yard pass from Paxton DeLaurent, DC Pippin kick (Drive: 6 plays, 52 yards, 1:32; UTM 35–28)
- (0:39) SEMO – Mitchell Sellers 10 yard pass from Paxton DeLaurent, DC Pippin kick (Drive: 8 plays, 45 yards, 1:43; TIED 35–35)

First overtime

- (0:00) SEMO – Mitchell Sellers 11 yard pass from Paxton DeLaurent, DC Pippin kick (Drive: 4 plays, 25 yards; SEMO 35–42)
- (0:00) UTM – Asa Wondeh 7 yard pass from Kinkead Dent, Jaren Van Winkle kick (Drive: 4 plays, 25 yards; TIED 42–42)

Second overtime

- (0:00) SEMO – DC Pippin 37 yard field goal (SEMO 42–45)

Statistics	UTM	SEMO
First downs	22	24
Total yards	470	365
Rushing yards	193	-11
Passing yards	277	376
Passing: Comp–Att–Int	23-33-0	34-64-0
Time of possession	38:13	21:47

Team	Category	Player	Statistics
UT Martin	Passing	Kinkead Dent	23/33, 277 yards, 4 TD
UT Martin	Rushing	Patrick Smith	26 carries, 148 yards, 1 TD
UT Martin	Receiving	DeVonte Tanksley	7 receptions, 113 yards
Southeast Missouri State	Passing	Paxton DeLaurent	34/63, 376 yards, 6 TD
Southeast Missouri State	Rushing	Payton Brown	2 carries, 3 yards
Southeast Missouri State	Receiving	Dorian Anderson	8 receptions, 127 yards, 2 TD

=== at No. 7 Southern Illinois ===
Game Four – No. 21 Southeast Missouri State Redhawks (2–1) vs No. 7 Southern Illinois Salukis (2–1) – Game summary

Quarter	1	2	3	4	Total
No. 21 Redhawks	13	3	8	14	38
No. 7 Salukis	2	10	9	0	21

at Saluki Stadium • Carbondale, IL

- Date: September 21, 2024
- Game time: 6:00 p.m. CST
- Game weather: Cloudy, 86 °F (30 °C)
- Game attendance: 13,421
- Referee: Jason Berg
- TV: ESPN+

Game information

First quarter

- (8:59) SEMO – Kyron Downing 12 yard pass from Paxton DeLaurent, DC Pippin kick blocked (Drive: 7 plays, 34 yards, 0:57; SEMO 6-0)
- (8:59) SIU – Stephen Green 89 yard PAT return (SEMO 6-2)
- (2:06) SEMO – Dorian Anderson 19 yard pass from Paxton DeLaurent, DC Pippin kick (Drive: 7 plays, 80 yards, 3:34; SEMO 13-2)

Second quarter

- (8:25) SIU – Vinson Davis III 11 yard pass from Hunter Simmons, Paul Geelen kick (Drive: 12 plays, 69 yards, 6:08; SEMO 13-9)
- (1:45) SIU – Paul Geelen 38 yard field goal (Drive: 11 plays, 66 yards, 3:45; SEMO 13–12)
- (0:07) SEMO – DC Pippin 43 yard field goal (Drive: 8 plays, 41 yards, 1:30; SEMO 16–12)

Third quarter

- (8:32) SIU – Paul Geelen 34 yard field goal (Drive: 11 plays, 43 yards, 5:22; SEMO 16–15)
- (2:06) SIU – Willtrell Hartson 3 yard run (Drive: 7 plays, 48 yards, 2:52; SIU 16-21)
- (1:16) SEMO – Dorian Anderson 19 yard pass from Paxton DeLaurent, Tristan Smith pass (Drive: 4 plays, 71 yards, 0:43; SEMO 24-21)

Fourth quarter

- (11:58) SEMO – Mitchell Sellers 3 yard pass from Paxton DeLaurent, DC Pippin kick (Drive: 8 plays, 46 yards, 3:08; SEMO 31-21)
- (11:58) SEMO – Payton Brown 1 yard run, DC Pippin kick (Drive: 11 plays, 66 yards, 6:22; SEMO 38-21)

Statistics	SEMO	SIU
First downs	22	24
Total yards	449	403
Rushing yards	148	62
Passing yards	301	341
Passing: Comp–Att–Int	25-41-1	28-48-0
Time of possession	26:01	33:59

Team	Category	Player	Statistics
Southeast Missouri State	Passing	Paxton DeLaurent	25/40, 301 yards, 4 TD, 1 INT
Southeast Missouri State	Rushing	Payton Brown	18 carries, 124 yards, 1 TD
Southeast Missouri State	Receiving	Dorian Anderson	8 receptions, 111 yards, 2 TD
Southern Illinois	Passing	Hunter Simmons	28/48, 341 yards, 1 TD
Southern Illinois	Rushing	Jerrian Parker	15 carries, 32 yards
Southern Illinois	Receiving	Vinson Davis III	9 receptions, 132 yards, 1 TD

=== vs. Northwestern State ===
Game Five – Northwestern State Demons (0–4) at No. 13 Southeast Missouri State Redhawks (3–1) – Game summary

Quarter	1	2	3	4	Total
Demons	0	0	0	0	0
No. 13 Redhawks	10	3	3	3	19

at Houck Stadium • Cape Girardeau, MO

- Date: Saturday September 28, 2024
- Game time: 3:00 p.m.
- Game weather: Cloudy, 72 °F (22 °C)
- Referee: Jeremee Tate
- TV announcers (ESPN+): Erik Sean (play-by-play) and Rick Weiser (analyst)

Game information

First quarter

- SEMO – Cam Pedro 10-yard pass from Paxton DeLaurent (D. C. Pippin kick), 9:03. Redhawks 7–0. Drive: 9 plays, 37 yards, 2:44.
- SEMO – D. C. Pippin 30-yard field goal, 5:54. Redhawks 10–0. Drive: 9 plays, 53 yards, 2:46.

Second quarter

- SEMO – D. C. Pippin 38-yard field goal, 7:15. Redhawks 13–0. Drive: 17 plays, 29 yards, 7:39.

Third quarter

- SEMO – D. C. Pippin 37-yard field goal, 11:11. Redhawks 16–0. Drive: 9 plays, 50 yards, 3:39.

Fourth quarter

- SEMO – D. C. Pippin 24-yard field goal, 7:04. Redhawks 19–0. Drive: 12 plays, 50 yards, 6:25.

Statistics	NWST	SEMO
First downs	5	26
Total yards	120	420
Rushing yards	53	183
Passing yards	67	237
Passing: Comp–Att–Int	9–18–0	21–43–1
Time of possession	18:15	41:45

Team	Category	Player	Statistics
Northwestern State	Passing	Quaterius Hawkins	5/6, 51 yards
Northwestern State	Rushing	Zay Davis	7 carries, 16 yards
Northwestern State	Receiving	Travon Jones	3 receptions, 26 yards
Southeast Missouri State	Passing	Paxton DeLaurent	21/43, 237 yards, TD, INT
Southeast Missouri State	Rushing	Darrell Smith	31 carries, 127 yards
Southeast Missouri State	Receiving	Cam Pedro	4 receptions, 58 yards, TD

=== at Eastern Illinois ===
Game Six – No. 13 Southeast Missouri State Redhawks (4–1) at Eastern Illinois Panthers (1–4) – Game summary

Quarter	1	2	3	4	Total
No. 13 Redhawks	7	7	7	7	28
Panthers	0	7	7	13	27

at O'Brien Field, Charleston, IL

- Date: Saturday October 5, 2024
- Game time: 2:00 PM
- Game weather: Sunny, 83 °F (28 °C)
- Game attendance: 7,777
- Referee: Drew Myers
- TV announcers (ESPN+): Mike Bradd (play-by-play), Dave Kidwell (analyst) and Kacy Standohar (sideline)

Game information

First quarter

- (9:45) SEMO – DC Pippin 26 yard field goal (Drive: 14 plays, 67 yards, 5:15; SEMO 3–0)
- (3:03) SEMO – Mitchell Sellers 9 yard pass from Paxton DeLaurent, DC Pippin kick (Drive: 6 plays, 62 yards, 1:52; SEMO 10–0)
- (0:42) SEMO – Dorian Anderson 29 yard pass from Paxton DeLaurent, DC Pippin kick (Drive: 1 play, 29 yards, 0:08; SEMO 17–0)

Second quarter

- (9:35) SEMO – Cole Ruble 2 yard run, DC Pippin kick (Drive: 11 plays, 62 yards, 4:37; SEMO 24–0)
- (0:27) EIU – Cooper Willman 12 yard pass from Pierce Holley, Julian Patino kick (Drive: 9 plays, 80 yards, 1:45; SEMO 24–7)

Third quarter

- (11:40) EIU – MJ Flowers 1 yard run, Julian Patino kick (Drive: 7 plays, 75 yards, 3:20; SEMO 24–14)
- (10:02) SEMO – Tristan Smith 3 yard pass from Paxton DeLaurent, DC Pippin kick (Drive: 4 plays, 73 yards, 1:31; SEMO 31–14)

Fourth quarter

- (12:22) SEMO – Paxton DeLaurent 1 yard run, DC Pippin kick (Drive: 16 plays, 98 yards, 7:55; SEMO 38–14)
- (7:59) EIU – Quenton Rogers 39 yard pass from Pierce Holley (Drive: 9 plays, 82 yards, 4:20; SEMO 38–20)
- (2:10) EIU – MJ Flowers 2 yard run, Julian Patino kick (Drive: 2 plays, 29 yards, 0:29; SEMO 38–27)

Statistics	SEMO	EIU
First downs	26	19
Total yards	426	385
Rushing yards	61	19
Passing yards	364	366
Passing: Comp–Att–Int	30–43–1	27–42–0
Time of possession	34:02	25:58

Team	Category	Player	Statistics
Southeast Missouri State	Passing	Paxton DeLaurent	30/43, 364 yards, 3 TD, 1 INT
Southeast Missouri State	Rushing	Darrell Smith	18 carries, 63 yards
Southeast Missouri State	Receiving	Tristan Smith	8 receptions, 124 yards, 1 TD
Eastern Illinois	Passing	Pierce Holley	27/42, 366 yards, 2 TD
Eastern Illinois	Rushing	MJ Flowers	14 carries, 48 yards, 2 TD
Eastern Illinois	Receiving	MJ Flowers	11 receptions, 72 yards

=== vs. Tennessee Tech ===
Game Seven – Tennessee Tech Golden Eagles (2–3) vs No. 11 Southeast Missouri State Redhawks (5–1) – Game summary

Quarter	1	2	3	4	Total
Golden Eagles	0	0	3	0	3
No. 11 Redhawks	0	10	7	17	34

at Houck Stadium • Cape Girardeau, MO

- Date: Saturday October 12, 2024
- Game time: 3:00 p.m.
- Game weather: Sunny, 80 °F (27 °C)
- Game attendance: 5,220
- Referee: Zach Erdmann
- TV announcers (ESPN+): TBD

Game information

First quarter

No scoring plays

Second quarter

- (6:45) SEMO – DC Pippin 24 yard field goal (Drive: 10 plays, 74 yards, 5:06; SEMO 3–0)
- (4:36) SEMO – Tristan Smith 13 yard pass from Paxton DeLaurent, DC Pippin kick (Drive: 3 plays, 62 yards, 1:15; SEMO 10–0)

Third quarter

- (8:41) TNTC – Dom LeBlanc 43 yard field goal (Drive: 14 plays, 63 yards, 6:15; SEMO 10–3)
- (5:22) SEMO – Cam Pedro 46 yard pass from Paxton DeLaurent, DC Pippin kick (Drive: 7 plays, 75 yards, 3:19; SEMO 17–3)

Fourth quarter

- (13:42) SEMO – Mitchell Sellers 31 yard pass from Paxton DeLaurent, DC Pippin kick (Drive: 2 plays, 23 yards, 0:41; SEMO 24–3)
- (9:23) SEMO – Dorian Anderson 5 yard pass from Paxton DeLaurent, DC Pippin kick (Drive: 6 plays, 41 yards, 2:49; SEMO 31–3)
- (0:27) SEMO – DC Pippin 35 yard field goal (Drive: 7 plays, 7 yards, 3:45; SEMO 34–3)

Statistics	TNTC	SEMO
First downs	20	23
Total yards	265	455
Rushing yards	34	37
Passing yards	231	418
Passing: Comp–Att–Int	26-47-2	34-46-2
Time of possession	30:29	29:31

Team	Category	Player	Statistics
Tennessee Tech	Passing	Jordyn Potts	26/47, 231 yards, 2 INT
Tennessee Tech	Rushing	Jalen Mitchell	10 carries, 25 yards
Tennessee Tech	Receiving	D.J. Linkins	7 receptions, 90 yards
Southeast Missouri State	Passing	Paxton DeLaurent	34/46, 418 yards, 4 TD, 2 INT
Southeast Missouri State	Rushing	Cole Ruble	10 carries, 31 yards
Southeast Missouri State	Receiving	Cam Pedro	6 receptions, 111 yards

=== at Charleston Southern ===
Game Eight – No. 8 Southeast Missouri State Redhawks (6–1) vs Charleston Southern Buccaneers (1–4) – Game summary

Quarter	1	2	3	4	Total
No. 8 Redhawks	6	10	7	3	26
Buccaneers	0	7	6	0	13

at Buccaneer Field • North Charleston, SC

- Date: Saturday October 19, 2024
- Game time: 3:00 p.m.
- Game weather: Sunny, 71 °F (22 °C)
- Game attendance: 3,105
- Referee: Gabriel Tomlin
- TV announcers (ESPN+): Justin Biegel (play-by-play) and Jack Delongchamps (analyst)

Game information

First quarter

- (11:35) SEMO – DC Pippin 25 yard field goal (Drive: 7 plays, 35 yards, 2:07; SEMO 3–0)
- (4:04) SEMO – DC Pippin 24 yard field goal (Drive: 10 plays, 57 yards, 2:53; SEMO 6–0)

Second quarter

- (14:52) CHSO – Chris Rhone 26 yard pass from NAME, NAME kick (Drive: 7 plays, 75 yards, 4:12; CHSO 7–6)
- (12:16) SEMO – DC Pippin 34 yard field goal (Drive: 10 plays, 59 yards, 2:36; SEMO 9–7)
- (0:09) SEMO – Tristan Smith 1 yard run, NAME kick (Drive: 19 plays, 83 yards, 5:09; SEMO 16–7)

Third quarter

- (10:38) SEMO – Kyron Downing 20 yard pass from NAME, NAME kick (Drive: 7 plays, 79 yards, 2:07; SEMO 23–7)
- (0:00) CHSO – Chris Rhone 44 yard pass from NAME (Drive: 7 plays, 77 yards, 3:28; SEMO 23–13)

Fourth quarter

- (11:12) SEMO – DC Pippin 27 yard field goal (Drive: 10 plays, 67 yards, 3:42; SEMO 26–13)

Statistics	SEMO	CHSO
First downs	28	12
Total yards	415	255
Rushing yards	80	108
Passing yards	335	147
Passing: Comp–Att–Int	32–55–0	12–18–0
Time of possession	33:43	26:17

Team	Category	Player	Statistics
Southeast Missouri State	Passing	Paxton DeLaurent	32/55, 335 yards, 1 TD
Southeast Missouri State	Rushing	Jacorey Love	12 carries, 65 yards
Southeast Missouri State	Receiving	Tristan Smith	7 receptions, 90 yards
Charleston Southern	Passing	Kaleb Jackson	9/15, 125 yards, 2 TD
Charleston Southern	Rushing	Autavius Ison	11 carries, 44 yards
Charleston Southern	Receiving	Chris Rhone	6 receptions, 98 yards, 2 TD

=== vs. Gardner-Webb ===
Game Nine – Gardner–Webb Runnin' Bulldogs (2–5) at No. 6 Southeast Missouri State Redhawks (7–1) – Game summary

Quarter	1	2	3	4	Total
Runnin' Bulldogs	14	0	7	3	24
No. 6 Redhawks	0	21	6	3	30

at Houck Stadium • Cape Girardeau, MO

- Date: Saturday October 26, 2024
- Game time: 2:00 p.m.
- Game weather: Sunny
- Game attendance: 7,295
- Referee: Michael Lennie
- TV announcers (ESPN+): TBD

Game information

First quarter

- (5:02) GWEB – Edward Saydee 17 yard run, Jay Billingsley kick (Drive: 3 plays, 22 yards, 0:55; GWEB 7–0)
- (4:21) GWEB – Anthony Lowe 14 yard pass from Tyler Ridell, Jay Billingsley kick (Drive: 2 plays, 15 yards, 0:33; GWEB 14–0)

Second quarter

- (14:06) SEMO – Dorian Anderson 3 yard pass from Paxton DeLaurent, DC Pippin kick (Drive: 14 plays, 75 yards, 5:15; GWEB 14–7)
- (12:31) SEMO – Cole Ruble 65 yard run, DC Pippin kick (Drive: 1 play, 65 yards, 0:10; TIED 14–14)
- (1:04) SEMO – Tristan Smith 20 yard pass from Paxton DeLaurent, DC Pippin kick (Drive: 12 plays, 94 yards, 5:08; SEMO 21–14)

Third quarter

- (12:02) SEMO – DC Pippin 45 yard field goal (Drive: 6 plays, 49 yards, 1:11; SEMO 24–14)
- (9:28) GWEB – Edward Saydee 25 yard pass from Tyler Ridell, Jay Billingsley kick (Drive: 6 plays, 77 yards, 2:28; SEMO 24–21)
- (5:03) SEMO – DC Pippin 28 yard field goal (Drive: 12 plays, 61 yards, 4:19; SEMO 27–21)

Fourth quarter

- (10:01) GWEB – Jay Billingsley 35 yard field goal (Drive: 9 plays, 44 yards, 3:59; SEMO 27–24)
- (5:09) SEMO – DC Pippin 37 yard field goal (Drive: 10 plays, 56 yards, 4:52; SEMO 30–24)

Statistics	GWEB	SEMO
First downs	13	25
Total yards	274	432
Rushing yards	107	120
Passing yards	167	312
Passing: Comp–Att–Int	14–31–2	35–58–2
Time of possession	25:56	34:04

Team	Category	Player	Statistics
Gardner–Webb	Passing	Tyler Ridell	14/31, 167 yards, 2 TD, 2 INT
Gardner–Webb	Rushing	Edward Saydee	13 carries, 52 yards, 1 TD
Gardner–Webb	Receiving	Edward Saydee	4 receptions, 84 yards, 1 TD
Southeast Missouri State	Passing	Paxton DeLaurent	35/58, 312 yards, 2 TD, 2 INT
Southeast Missouri State	Rushing	Cole Ruble	16 carries, 122 yards, 1 TD
Southeast Missouri State	Receiving	Dorian Anderson	7 receptions, 80 yards, 1 TD

=== at Lindenwood ===
Game Ten – No. 6 Southeast Missouri State Redhawks (8–1) vs Lindenwood Lions (4–6) – Game summary

Quarter	1	2	3	4	Total
No. 6 Redhawks	0	6	6	0	12
Lions	0	14	7	3	24

at Harlen C. Hunter Stadium • St. Charles, MO

- Date: Saturday November 9, 2024
- Game time: 1:30 p.m.
- Game weather: Rainy, 55 °F (13 °C)
- Game attendance: 5,108
- Referee: John Kellemeir
- TV announcers (ESPN+): TBD

Game information

First quarter

No scoring plays

Second quarter

- (13:13) SEMO – DC Pippin 39 yard field goal (Drive: 7 plays, 44 yards, 2:49; SEMO 3–0)
- (5:55) LIN – Drew Krobath 20 yard pass from Nate Glantz, Logan Seibert kick (Drive: 7 plays, 92 yards, 3:32; LIN 7–3)
- (3:07) SEMO – DC Pippin 47 yard field goal (Drive: 7 plays, 50 yards, 2:43; LIN 7–6)
- (0:13) LIN – Jeff Caldwell 3 yard pass from Nate Glantz, Logan Seibert kick (Drive: 8 plays, 75 yards, 2:54; LIN 14–6)

Third quarter

- (7:20) LIN – Nate Glantz 27 yard run, Logan Seibert kick (Drive: 3 plays, 52 yards, 0:56; LIN 21–6)
- (5:05) SEMO – Paxton DeLaurent 3 yard run (Drive: 3 plays, 37 yards, 0:29; LIN 21–12)

Fourth quarter

- (4:51) LIN – Logan Seibert 32 yard field goal (Drive: 5 plays, 5 yards, 2:45; LIN 24–12)

Statistics	SEMO	LIN
First downs	8	17
Total yards	234	375
Rushing yards	60	192
Passing yards	174	183
Passing: Comp–Att–Int	16–37–1	13–20–1
Time of possession	19:26	40:34

Team	Category	Player	Statistics
Southeast Missouri State	Passing	Paxton DeLaurent	16/37, 174 yards, 1 INT
Southeast Missouri State	Rushing	Darrell Smith	9 carries, 37 yards
Southeast Missouri State	Receiving	Tristan Smith	7 receptions, 64 yards
Lindenwood	Passing	Nate Glantz	13/20, 183 yards, 2 TD, 1 INT
Lindenwood	Rushing	Steve Hall	18 carries, 91 yards
Lindenwood	Receiving	Jeff Caldwell	6 receptions, 99 yards, 1 TD

=== vs. Western Illinois ===
Game Eleven – Western Illinois Leathernecks (3–7) vs No. 12 Southeast Missouri State Redhawks (8–2) – Game summary

Quarter	1	2	3	4	Total
Leathernecks	14	13	6	12	45
No. 12 Redhawks	10	21	13	10	54

at Houck Stadium • Cape Girardeau, MO

- Date: Saturday November 16, 2024
- Game time: 1:00 p.m.
- Game weather: Sunny, 60 °F (16 °C)
- Game attendance: 4,839
- Referee: Matthew Jones
- TV announcers (ESPN+): TBD

Game information

First quarter

- (7:44) SEMO – Brandon Epton Jr. 21 yard pass from Paxton DeLaurent, DC Pippin kick (Drive: 3 plays, 41 yards, 0:27; SEMO 7–0)
- (5:25) WIU – Brandon Lanier 16 yard pass from Nathan Lamb, Antonio Chadha kick (Drive: 5 plays, 75 yards, 2:19; TIED 7–7)
- (3:09) SEMO – DC Pippin 43 yard field goal (Drive: 6 plays, 41 yards, 2:11; SEMO 10–7)
- (1:17) WIU – Cameren Smith 81 yard pass from Nathan Lamb, Antonio Chadha kick (Drive: 5 plays, 99 yards, 1:43; WIU 14–7)

Second quarter

- (12:17) SEMO – Cam Pedro 39 yard pass from Paxton DeLaurent, DC Pippin kick (Drive: 8 plays, 77 yards, 3:55; SEMO 17–14)
- (8:36) WIU – Demari Davis 29 yard pass from Tanner Zolnosky, Antonio Chadha kick (Drive: 8 plays, 75 yards, 3:41; WIU 21–17)
- (7:00) WIU – Antonio Chadha 46 yard field goal (Drive: 4 plays, 1 yard, 1:28; WIU 24–17)
- (2:05) SEMO – Paxton DeLaurent 10 yard run, DC Pippin kick (Drive: 8 plays, 75 yards, 4:55; TIED 24–24)
- (1:08) SEMO – Tristan Smith 17 yard pass from Paxton DeLaurent, DC Pippin kick (Drive: 5 plays, 55 yards, 0:27; SEMO 31–24)
- (0:00) WIU – Antonio Chadha 50 yard field goal (Drive: 8 plays, 42 yards, 1:08; SEMO 31–27)

Third quarter

- (13:09) SEMO – Dorian Anderson 48 yard pass from Paxton DeLaurent, DC Pippin kick (Drive: 4 plays, 70 yards, 1:46; SEMO 38–27)
- (7:23) SEMO – DC Pippin 20 yard field goal (Drive: 11 plays, 46 yards, 4:33; SEMO 41–27)
- (6:26) WIU – Matthew Henry 81 yard pass from Nathan Lamb (Drive: 2 plays, 84 yards, 0:51; SEMO 41–33)
- (2:22) SEMO – DC Pippin 40 yard field goal (Drive: 9 plays, 23 yards, 3:53; SEMO 44–33)

Fourth quarter

- (12:21) WIU – Cameren Smith 3 yard run (Drive: 10 plays, 75 yards, 5:01; SEMO 44–39)
- (5:35) SEMO – Brandon Epton Jr. 5 yard run, DC Pippin kick (Drive: 11 plays, 87 yards, 5:40; SEMO 51–39)
- (2:48) SEMO – DC Pippin 34 yard field goal (Drive: 6 plays, 27 yards, 2:35; SEMO 54–39)
- (1:13) WIU – Torrance Farmer Jr. 2 yard run (Drive: 10 plays, 68 yards, 1:35; SEMO 54–45)

Statistics	WIU	SEMO
First downs	25	33
Total yards	593	559
Rushing yards	93	192
Passing yards	500	367
Passing: Comp–Att–Int	27–42–3	24–39–1
Time of possession	26:09	33:51

Team	Category	Player	Statistics
Western Illinois	Passing	Nathan Lamb	24/39, 449 yds, 3 TD, 3 INT
Western Illinois	Rushing	Cameren Smith	17 carries, 84 yards, 1 TD
Western Illinois	Receiving	Matthew Henry	7 receptions, 183 yards, 1 TD
Southeast Missouri State	Passing	Paxton DeLaurent	24/39, 367 yds, 4 TD, 1 INT
Southeast Missouri State	Rushing	Brandon Epton Jr.	22 carries, 126 yards, 1 TD
Southeast Missouri State	Receiving	Dorian Anderson	5 receptions, 116 yards, 1 TD

=== at Tennessee State ===
Game Twelve – No. 12 Southeast Missouri State Redhawks (9–2) at Tennessee State Tigers (8–3) – Game summary

Quarter	1	2	3	4	Total
No. 12 Redhawks	0	14	0	7	21
Tigers	21	0	0	7	28

at Nissan Stadium • Nashville, TN

- Date: Saturday November 23, 2024
- Game time: 3:30 p.m.
- Game weather: Sunny, 53 °F (12 °C)
- Game attendance: 1,536
- Referee: Brad Carrell
- TV announcers (ESPN+): TBD

Game information

First quarter

- (9:34) TNST – Jalal Dean 7 yard pass from Draylen Ellis, James Lowery kick (Drive: 12 plays, 51 yards, 5:17; TNST 7–0)
- (7:08) TNST – Keandre Booker fumble return, James Lowery kick (TNST 14–0)
- (2:35) TNST – CJ Evans 56 yard pass from Draylen Ellis, James Lowery kick (Drive: 2 plays, 57 yards, 0:36; TNST 21–0)

Second quarter

- (7:56) SEMO – Dorian Anderson 31 yard pass from Paxton DeLaurent, DC Pippin kick (Drive: 9 plays, 69 yards, 3:48; TNST 21–7)
- (0:52) SEMO – Payton Brown 13 yard pass from Paxton DeLaurent, DC Pippin kick (Drive: 12 plays, 73 yards, 4:38; TNST 21–14)

Third quarter

No scoring plays

Fourth quarter

- (14:45) TNST – Draylen Ellis 42 yard run, James Lowery kick (Drive: 5 plays, 77 yards, 2:06; TNST 28–14)
- (6:56) SEMO – Payton Brown 1 yard run, DC Pippin kick (Drive: 6 plays, 49 yards, 2:00; TNST 28–21)

Statistics	SEMO	TNST
First downs	18	19
Total yards	308	347
Rushing yards	75	115
Passing yards	233	232
Passing: Comp–Att–Int	27–47–0	20–32–0
Time of possession	28:17	31:43

Team	Category	Player	Statistics
Southeast Missouri State	Passing	Paxton DeLaurent	27/46, 233 yards, 2 TD
Southeast Missouri State	Rushing	Payton Brown	10 carries, 45 yards, 1 TD
Southeast Missouri State	Receiving	Tristan Smith	8 receptions, 70 yards
Tennessee State	Passing	Draylen Ellis	20/31, 232 yards, 2 TD
Tennessee State	Rushing	Jaden McGill	18 carries, 73 yards
Tennessee State	Receiving	CJ Evans	6 receptions, 107 yards, 1 TD

=== at No. 11 Illinois State (NCAA Division I Playoff–First Round) ===
NCAA Division I Playoff–First Round – No. 16 Southeast Missouri State Redhawks (9–3) at No. 11 Illinois State Redbirds (9–3) – Game summary

Quarter	1	2	3	4	Total
No. 11 Redbirds	7	21	7	0	35
No. 16 Redhawks	7	0	7	13	27

at Houck Stadium • Cape Girardeau, MO

- Date: Saturday November 30, 2024
- Game time: 12:00 p.m.
- Game weather: Cloudy, 32 °F (0 °C)
- Game attendance: 0
- Referee: Preston Clipper
- TV announcers (ESPN+): Shawn Kenney (play-by-play) and Jay Sonnhalter (analyst)

Game information

First quarter

- (5:20) SEMO – Dorian Anderson 4 yard pass from Paxton DeLaurent, DC Pippin kick (Drive: 10 plays, 73 yards, 4:43; SEMO 7–0)
- (1:31) ILST – Wenkers Wright 2 yard run, Ian Wagner kick (Drive: 10 plays, 58 yards, 3:43; TIED 7–7)

Second quarter

- (5:50) ILST – Daniel Sobkowicz 62 yard pass from Tommy Rittenhouse (Drive: 2 plays, 62 yards, 0:38; ILST 13–7)
- (2:06) ILST – Jake Anderson 55 yard interception return, Daniel Sobkowicz pass to Mitch Bartol for two-point conversion (ILST 21–7)
- (0:43) ILST – Xavier Loyd 24 yard pass from Tommy Rittenhouse, Ian Wagner kick (Drive: 3 plays, 40 yards, 0:45; ILST 28–7)

Third quarter

- (11:40) SEMO – Donnie Cheers 10 yard pass from Paxton DeLaurent, DC Pippin kick (Drive: 10 plays, 88 yards, 3:12; ILST 28–14)
- (9:45) ILST – Keondre Jackson 30 yard interception return, Ian Wagner kick (ILST 35–14)

Fourth quarter

- (6:44) SEMO – Tristan Smith 9 yard pass from Paxton DeLaurent, DC Pippin kick (Drive: 11 plays, 75 yards, 2:40; ILST 35–21)
- (1:31) SEMO – Dorian Anderson 34 yard pass from Paxton DeLaurent (Drive: 4 plays, 66 yards, 0:39; ILST 35–27)

Statistics	ILST	SEMO
First downs	14	34
Total yards	322	602
Rushing yards	45	35
Passing yards	277	567
Passing: Comp–Att–Int	24–36–0	48–85–5
Time of possession	25:33	34:27

Team	Category	Player	Statistics
Illinois State	Passing	Tommy Rittenhouse	24/36, 277 yards, 2 TD
Illinois State	Rushing	Wenkers Wright	12 carries, 17 yards, 1 TD
Illinois State	Receiving	Daniel Sobkowicz	7 receptions, 136 yards, 1 TD
Southeast Missouri State	Passing	Paxton DeLaurent	48/85, 567 yards, 4 TD, 5 INT
Southeast Missouri State	Rushing	Brandon Epton Jr.	6 carries, 32 yards
Southeast Missouri State	Receiving	Cam Pedro	11 receptions, 149 yards

== Rankings ==
Ranking movements Legend: ██ Increase in ranking ██ Decrease in ranking — = Not ranked
	Week														
Poll	Pre	1	2	3	4	5	6	7	8	9	10	11	12	13	Final
STATS	—	—	—	21	13	13	11	8	6	6	6	12	12	16	16
Coaches	—	—	—	21	14	13	9	8	6	6	6	13	11	16	17
