= 2024 Gardner–Webb Runnin' Bulldogs football team =

American college football season

2024 Gardner–Webb Runnin' Bulldogs football
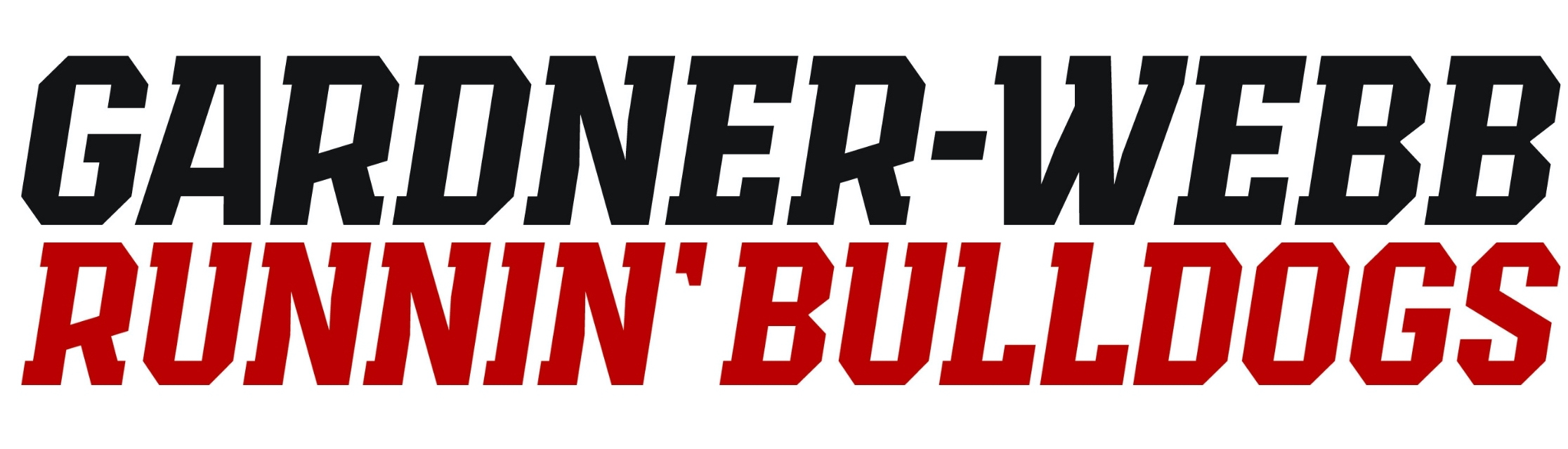
- Conference: Big South–OVC football
- Record: 4–8 (3–5 Big South–OVC)
- Head coach: Cris Reisert (1st season)
- Offensive coordinator: Tyler Johns (1st season)
- Defensive coordinator: Tim Cooper (1st season)
- Home stadium: Ernest W. Spangler Stadium

2024 Big South–OVC football standings
	Conf.			Overall
Team	W		L	W		L
No. 16 Southeast Missouri State +^	6	–	2	9	–	4
Tennessee Tech +	6	–	2	7	–	5
No. 17 UT Martin +^	6	–	2	9	–	5
No. 19 Tennessee State +^	6	–	2	9	–	4
Lindenwood*	4	–	4	5	–	7
Western Illinois	3	–	5	4	–	8
Gardner–Webb	3	–	5	4	–	8
Eastern Illinois	2	–	6	3	–	9
Charleston Southern	0	–	8	1	–	11
+ – Conference co-champions; ^ – FCS playoff participant; Note: Lindenwood ineligible for Big South–OVC title and FCS postseason play due to transition from NCAA Division II.; Rankings from STATS Poll

The 2024 Gardner–Webb Runnin' Bulldogs football team represented Gardner–Webb University as a member of the Big South–OVC Football Association during the 2024 NCAA Division I FCS football season. The team was led by first-year head coach Cris Reisert and played their home games at the Ernest W. Spangler Stadium located in Boiling Springs, North Carolina. They finished the season 4–8, 3–5 in Big South–OVC play to finish in a tie for sixth place.

== Preseason ==
=== Preseason poll ===
The Big South-OVC Conference released their preseason poll on July 17, 2024. The Runnin' Bulldogs were picked to finish fifth in the conference.

=== Transfers ===
==== Outgoing ====
Player	Position	New school
Jackson Head	TE	Austin Peay
Maleek Huggins	WR	Bethune-Cookman
Charlie Jackson	DL	Charlotte
Zach Billings	LS	Charlotte
T.J. Jones	RB	Duquesne
Ephraim Floyd	WR	East Tennessee State
Jimmy Bowdry	DB	East Tennessee State
AJ Johnson	WR	East Tennessee State
Kendall Williams	TE	East Tennessee State
Ty Anderson	LB	East Tennessee State
Karim Page	WR	East Tennessee State
Tyson Moorer	OL	East Tennessee State
Jaylen King	QB	East Tennessee State
Nick Hunter	DL	East Tennessee State
Justin Franklin	WR	East Tennessee State
Ryan Barrett	DB	East Tennessee State
Tywan Royal	DB	East Tennessee State
Jai Barnes	DL	East Tennessee State
Jonathan Burns	TE	East Tennessee State
Rashad Whitehead	DL	East Tennessee State
JaQuan Adams	OL	East Tennessee State
Willie Harris	DL	East Tennessee State
Will McCraw	OL	East Tennessee State
Gabe Thompson	OL	East Tennessee State
William McRainey	LB	East Tennessee State
Gino English	QB	East Tennessee State
Brandon Wilson	DL	East Tennessee State
Hakeem Meggett	WR	East Tennessee State
Grant Bullard	LB	East Tennessee State
Ja’Kai Young	DB	James Madison
Brice Bass	DL	Texas State
Matthew Caldwell	QB	Troy
Brendan Jackson	LB	Troy
Jayden Brown	RB	UConn
Tray Dunson	DB	UTEP
Ty French	LB	West Virginia
DJ Tyler	WR	Wofford

==== Incoming ====
Player	Position	Previous school
Trevor Moffitt	LB	Appalachian State
Jaden Lindsay	OL	Appalachian State
Miles Richardson	DB	Austin Peay
Karl Odrick	DL	Ball State
Camden Overton	TE	Chattanooga
Steven Rose	DB	Delaware
Jamari Young	LB	East Carolina
Tyler Riddell	QB	East Tennessee State
Jeff Bowens	DB	Illinois State
Collin Carroll	TE	James Madison
Jackson Marshall	LB	Marshall
Ren Hefley	QB	Middle Tennessee
Taylor Shields	WR	Murray State
Jordan Bly	WR	Old Dominion
QuaSean Holmes	RB	Saint Francis (PA)
Colten Gauthier	QB	South Carolina
Edward Saydee	RB	Temple
Nick Bigelow	P	Tennessee Tech
Ja’kheo Mitchell	DB	Utah State
Quinton Cannon	LB	Western Michigan
Anthony Enechukwu	DB	Western Michigan
Henry Wilson Jr.	WR	Western Michigan
Josh Sterns	WR	Western Kentucky
Ze’Vian Capers	WR	Western Kentucky
Marquis Black	DL	Western Kentucky

== Schedule ==
Date	Time	Opponent	Site	TV	Result	Attendance
August 29	7:00 p.m.	Wofford*	Ernest W. Spangler Stadium; Boiling Springs, NC	ESPN+	L 20–21	4,378
September 7	6:00 p.m.	at James Madison*	Bridgeforth Stadium; Harrisonburg, VA	ESPN+	L 6–13	24,570
September 14	6:00 p.m.	at Charlotte*	Jerry Richardson Stadium; Charlotte, NC	ESPN+	L 26–27	16,715
September 21	7:00 p.m.	at Presbyterian*	Bailey Memorial Stadium; Clinton, SC	ESPN+	W 42–21	1,843
September 28	4:00 p.m.	Tennessee Tech	Ernest W. Spangler Stadium; Boiling Springs, NC	ESPN+	L 21–52	2,451
October 5	3:00 p.m.	at UT Martin	Graham Stadium; Martin, TN	ESPN+	L 17–35	6,101
October 19	1:30 p.m.	Lindenwood^{†}	Ernest W. Spangler Stadium; Boiling Springs, NC	ESPN+	W 42–35	3,780
October 26	3:00 p.m.	at No. 6 Southeast Missouri State	Houck Stadium; Cape Girardeau, MO	ESPN+	L 24–30	7,295
November 2	2:00 p.m.	at Charleston Southern	Buccaneer Field; Charleston, SC	ESPN+	W 17–14	1,977
November 9	1:30 p.m.	Eastern Illinois	Ernest W. Spangler Stadium; Boiling Springs, NC	ESPN+	W 31–28	2,451
November 16	1:30 p.m.	Tennessee State	Ernest W. Spangler Stadium; Boiling Springs, NC	ESPN+	L 20–23	3,763
November 23	2:00 p.m.	at Western Illinois	Hanson Field; Macomb, IL	ESPN+	L 28–45	2,021
*Non-conference game; ^{†}Homecoming; Rankings from STATS Poll released prior to the game; All times are in Eastern time

== Game summaries ==
=== vs. Wofford ===
Game One – Wofford Terriers (0–0) at Gardner-Webb Runnin' Bulldogs (0–0) – Game summary

Quarter	1	2	3	4	Total
Terriers	8	3	0	10	21
Runnin' Bulldogs	3	10	7	0	20

at Ernest W. Spangler Stadium • Boiling Springs, NC

- Date: Thursday August 29, 2024
- Game time: 7:00 p.m.
- Game weather: Sunny, 88 °F (31 °C)
- Game attendance: 4,378
- Referee: Drew Myers
- TV announcers (FloSports): TBD

Game information

First quarter
Second quarter
Third quarter
Fourth quarter

Statistics	WOF	GWEB
First downs	21	16
Total yards	379	300
Rushing yards	119	62
Passing yards	260	235
Passing: Comp–Att–Int	22–35–0	18–28–0
Time of possession	36:11	23:49

Team	Category	Player	Statistics
Wofford	Passing	Amari Odom	22/35, 260 yards, 1 TD
Wofford	Rushing	J.T. Smith Jr.	12 carries, 47 yards
Wofford	Receiving	Kyle Watkins	7 receptions, 117 yards, 1 TD
Gardner–Webb	Passing	Tyler Ridell	18/28, 238 yards 1 TD
Gardner–Webb	Rushing	Edward Saydee	10 carries, 46 yards 1 TD
Gardner–Webb	Receiving	Ze'Vian Capers	6 receptions, 73 yards

=== at James Madison (FBS) ===
Game Two – Gardner–Webb Runnin' Bulldogs (0–1) at James Madison Dukes (FBS) (1–0) – Game summary

Quarter	1	2	3	4	Total
Runnin' Bulldogs	0	3	3	0	6
Dukes (FBS)	0	0	10	3	13

at Bridgeforth Stadium • Harrisonburg, VA

- Date: Saturday September 7, 2024
- Game time: 6:00 p.m.
- Game weather: Sunny, 70 °F (21 °C)
- Game attendance: 24,570
- Referee: Jeff Page
- TV announcers (FloSports): Curt Dudley (play-by-play), Brian Barlow (analyst) and David Hulvey (sideline)

Game information

First quarter

No scoring

Second quarter

- (8:51) GWEB – Jay Billingsley 43 yard field goal (Drive: 12 plays, 48 yards, 6:04; Gardner-Webb 3–0)

Third quarter

- (10:30) JMU – Tyler Purdy 1 yard run, Noe Ruelas kick (Drive: 10 plays, 58 yards, 3:36; JMU 7–3)
- (7:14) JMU – Noe Ruelas 48 yard field goal (Drive: 4 plays, 2 yards, 1:48; JMU 10–3)
- (1:35) GWEB – Jay Billingsley 30 yard field goal (Drive: 11 plays, 62 yards, 5:39; JMU 10–6)

Fourth quarter

- (7:14) JMU – Noe Ruelas 26 yard field goal (Drive: 12 plays, 66 yards, 5:21; JMU 13–6)

Statistics	GWEB	JMU
First downs	16	15
Total yards	269	285
Rushing yards	109	150
Passing yards	160	135
Passing: Comp–Att–Int	17–30–2	14–22
Time of possession	33:58	26:02

Team	Category	Player	Statistics
Gardner–Webb	Passing	Tyler Ridell	17/30, 160 yards, 2 INT
Gardner–Webb	Rushing	Edward Saydee	22 carries, 87 yards
Gardner–Webb	Receiving	Camden Overton	5 receptions, 65 yards
James Madison	Passing	Alonza Barnett III	14/22, 135 yards
James Madison	Rushing	George Pettaway	10 carries, 84 yards
James Madison	Receiving	George Pettaway	4 receptions, 32 yards

=== at Charlotte (FBS) ===
Game Three – Gardner–Webb Runnin' Bulldogs (0–2) at Charlotte 49ers (FBS) (0–2) – Game summary

Quarter	1	2	3	4	Total
Runnin' Bulldogs	3	14	3	6	26
49ers (FBS)	0	3	3	21	27

at Jerry Richardson Stadium • Charlotte, NC

- Date: Saturday September 14, 2024
- Game time: 6:00 p.m.
- Game weather: Sunny • Temperature: 82 °F (28 °C) • Wind: E at 14 miles per hour (23 km/h)
- Game attendance: 16,715
- Referee: Reid Jackson
- TV announcers (ESPN+): James Westling (play-by-play) and Reggie Walker (analyst)

Game information

First quarter

- (6:47) GWEB – Jay Billingsley 30 yard field goal (Drive: 11 plays, 69 yards, 6:07; Gardner–Webb 3–0)

Second quarter

- (8:04) GWEB – Trevor Moffitt 45 yard interception return, Jay Billingsley kick (Gardner–Webb 10–0)
- (0:35) GWEB – Anthony Lowe 30 yard pass from Tyler Ridell, Jay Billingsley kick (Drive: 12 plays, 99 yards, 5:09; Gardner–Webb 17–0)
- (0:00) CLT – Stephen Rusnak 54 yard field goal (Drive: 5 plays, 28 yards, 0:29; Gardner–Webb 17–3)

Third quarter

- (9:02) GWEB – Jay Billingsley 44 yard field goal (Drive: 12 plays, 48 yards, 5:58; Gardner–Webb 20–3)
- (1:23) CLT – Stephen Rusnak 25 yard field goal (Drive: 6 plays, 35 yards, 3:10; Gardner–Webb 20–6)

Fourth quarter

- (9:09) CLT – O'Mega Blake 11 yard pass from Trexler Ivey, 2-point pass failed (Drive: 9 plays, 57 yards, 3:50; Gardner–Webb 20–12)
- (5:20) CLT – Sean Brown 28 yard pass from Trexler Ivey, 2-point pass (Drive: 6 plays, 75 yards, 2:19; Tied 20–20)
- (4:55) CLT – Hahsaun Wilson 39 yard run, Stephen Rusnak kick (Drive: 1 play, 39 yards, 0:09; Charlotte 27–20)
- (1:55) GWEB – Carson Gresock 1 yard run, 2-point pass failed (Drive: 9 plays, 75 yards, 3:00; Charlotte 27–26)

Statistics	GWEB	CLT
First downs	18	20
Total yards	390	349
Rushing yards	50	13
Passing yards	340	336
Passing: Comp–Att–Int	23–38–2	27–35–1
Time of possession	32:30	27:30

Team	Category	Player	Statistics
Gardner–Webb	Passing	Tyler Ridell	23/37, 340 yards, 1 TD, 2 INT
Gardner–Webb	Rushing	Edward Saydee	11 carries, 42 yards
Gardner–Webb	Receiving	Anthony Lowe	7 receptions, 122 yards, 1 TD
Charlotte	Passing	Deshawn Purdie	16/23, 194 yards, 1 INT
Charlotte	Rushing	Hahsaun Wilson	6 carries, 52 yards, 1 TD
Charlotte	Receiving	Bryce Kennon	5 receptions, 70 yards

=== at Presbyterian ===
Game Four – Gardner–Webb Runnin' Bulldogs (0–3) at Presbyterian Blue Hose (2–1) – Game summary

Quarter	1	2	3	4	Total
Runnin' Bulldogs	7	14	0	21	42
Blue Hose	0	14	0	7	21

at Bailey Memorial Stadium • Clinton, SC

- Date: Saturday September 21, 2024
- Game time: 7:00 p.m.
- Game weather: Sunny, 84 °F (29 °C)
- Game attendance: 1,843
- Referee: Jake Grombach
- TV announcers (ESPN+): TBD

Game information

First quarter

Second quarter

Third quarter

Fourth quarter

Statistics	GWEB	PRES
First downs	26	15
Total yards	485	322
Rushing yards	247	25
Passing yards	238	297
Passing: Comp–Att–Int	19–28–1	22–36–0
Time of possession	37:22	22:38

Team	Category	Player	Statistics
Gardner–Webb	Passing	Tyler Ridell	19/26, 238 yards, 1 TD, 1 INT
Gardner–Webb	Rushing	Carson Gresock	22 carries, 134 yards, 3 TD
Gardner–Webb	Receiving	Giovanni Adopte	5 receptions, 72 yards, 1 TD
Presbyterian	Passing	Collin Hurst	14/22, 199 yards, 2 TD
Presbyterian	Rushing	Antonio Wright	4 carries, 16 yards
Presbyterian	Receiving	Cincere Gill	2 receptions, 69 yards, 1 TD

=== vs. Tennessee Tech ===
Game Five – Tennessee Tech Golden Eagles (1–2) vs Gardner–Webb Runnin' Bulldogs (1–3) – Game summary

Quarter	1	2	3	4	Total
Golden Eagles	7	17	21	7	52
Runnin' Bulldogs	0	7	0	14	21

at Ernest W. Spangler Stadium • Boiling Springs, NC

- Date: Saturday September 28, 2024
- Game time: 4:00 p.m.
- Game weather: Sunny, 75 °F (24 °C)
- Game attendance: 2,451
- Referee: Gabe Tomlin
- TV: ESPN+

Game information

First quarter
Second quarter
Third quarter
Fourth quarter

Statistics	TNTC	GWEB
First downs	21	22
Total yards	414	329
Rushing yards	340	103
Passing yards	74	226
Passing: Comp–Att–Int	5–10–0	27–41–2
Time of possession	24:42	31:21

Team	Category	Player	Statistics
Tennessee Tech	Passing	Jordyn Potts	5/10, 74 yds, 1 TD
Tennessee Tech	Rushing	Aidan Littles	10 carries, 118 yards, 1 TD
Tennessee Tech	Receiving	D.J. Linkins	2 receptions, 48 yards, 1 TD
Gardner–Webb	Passing	Ren Hefley	13/20, 116 yds, 1 TD, 1 INT
Gardner–Webb	Rushing	Carson Gresock	13 carries, 86 yards, 1 TD
Gardner–Webb	Receiving	Jordan Bly	6 receptions, 6 yards, 1 TD

=== at UT Martin ===
Game Six – Gardner–Webb Runnin' Bulldogs (1–4) at UT Martin Skyhawks (2–3) – Game summary

Quarter	1	2	3	4	Total
Runnin' Bulldogs	3	0	0	14	17
Skyhawks	7	14	14	0	35

at Graham Stadium • Martin, TN

- Date: Saturday October 5, 2024
- Game time: 3:00 p.m.
- Game weather: Sunny, 87 °F (31 °C)
- Game attendance: 6,101
- Referee: Zach Erdmann
- TV: ESPN+

Game information

First quarter

- (8:59) GWEB – Jay Billingsley 46 yard field goal (Drive: 9 plays, 45 yards, 3:56; GWEB 3–0)
- (3:02) UTM – Patrick Smith 1 yard run, Jaren Van Winkle kick (Drive: 12 plays, 72 yards, 5:50; UTM 7–3)

Second quarter

- (9:20) UTM – Tyler Dostin 55 yard pass from Kinkead Dent, Jaren Van Winkle kick (Drive: 1 play, 55 yards, 0:09; UTM 14–3)
- (5:09) UTM – Patrick Smith 4 yard run, Jaren Van Winkle kick (Drive: 5 plays, 34 yards, 2:40; UTM 21–3)

Third quarter

- (8:06) UTM – Kinkead Dent 4 yard run, Jaren Van Winkle kick (Drive: 7 plays, 80 yards, 4:02; UTM 28–3)
- (0:23) UTM – Patrick Smith 30 yard run, Jaren Van Winkle kick (Drive: 6 plays, 80 yards, 2:41; UTM 35–3)

Fourth quarter

- (6:24) GWEB – Carson Gresock 3 yard run, Jay Billingsley kick (Drive: 6 plays, 44 yards, 2:48; UTM 35–10)
- (1:44) GWEB – Quasean Holmes 8 yard pass from Tyler Ridell, Jay Billingsley kick (Drive: 4 plays, 73 yards, 1:00; UTM 35–17)

Statistics	GWEB	UTM
First downs	17	21
Total yards	303	402
Rushing yards	146	235
Passing yards	157	167
Passing: Comp–Att–Int	15–24–1	15–25–0
Time of possession	29:21	30:39

Team	Category	Player	Statistics
Gardner–Webb	Passing	Tyler Ridell	10/14, 145 yards, 1 TD, 1 INT
Gardner–Webb	Rushing	Edward Saydee	17 carries, 112 yards
Gardner–Webb	Receiving	Giovanni Adopte	3 receptions, 52 yards
UT Martin	Passing	Kinkead Dent	15/23, 167 yards, 1 TD
UT Martin	Rushing	Patrick Smith	15 carries, 128 yards, 3 TD
UT Martin	Receiving	Tyler Dostin	3 receptions, 66 yards, 1 TD

=== vs. Lindenwood ===
Game Seven – Lindenwood Lions (3–4) vs Gardner–Webb Runnin' Bulldogs (1–5) – Game summary

Quarter	1	2	3	4	Total
Lions	7	7	7	14	35
Runnin' Bulldogs	7	21	14	0	42

at Ernest W. Spangler Stadium • Boiling Springs, NC

- Date: Saturday October 19, 2024
- Game time: 1:30 p.m.
- Game weather: Sunny, 71 °F (22 °C)
- Game attendance: 3,780
- Referee: John Kellermeier
- TV: ESPN+

Game information

First quarter

- (9:45) GWEB – Anthony Lowe 3 yard pass from Tyler Ridell, Jay Billingsley kick (Drive: 12 plays, 75 yards, 5:15; GWEB 7–0)
- (3:31) LIN – Reece Thomas 21 yard pass from Nate Glantz, Logan Seibert kick (Drive: 10 plays, 75 yards, 6:14; TIE 7–7)

Second quarter

- (14:00) GWEB – Edward Saydee 13 yard run, Jay Billingsley kick (Drive: 10 plays, 72 yards, 4:21; GWEB 14–7)
- (10:50) LIN – Cortezz Jones 2 yard run, Logan Seibert kick (Drive: 7 plays, 88 yards, 3:01; TIE 14–14)
- (7:11) GWEB – Jordan Bly 19 yard pass from Tyler Ridell, Jay Billingsley kick (Drive: 7 plays, 75 yards, 3:39; GWEB 21–14)
- (0:22) GWEB – Jordan Bly 26 yard pass from Tyler Ridell, Jay Billingsley kick (Drive: 6 plays, 45 yards, 1:23; GWEB 28–14)

Third quarter

- (12:06) LIN – Jeff Caldwell 49 yard pass from Nate Glantz, Logan Seibert kick (Drive: 7 plays, 74 yards, 2:54; GWEB 28–21)
- (9:52) GWEB – Taylor Shields 11 yard pass from Tyler Ridell, Jay Billingsley kick (Drive: 6 plays, 69 yards, 2:03; GWEB 35–21)
- (2:41) GWEB – Quasean Holmes 17 yard run, Jay Billingsley kick (Drive: 4 plays, 40 yards, 0:59; GWEB 42–21)

Fourth quarter

- (14:55) LIN – Steve Hall 17 yard run, Logan Seibert kick (Drive: 6 plays, 75 yards, 2:46; GWEB 42–28)
- (0:31) LIN – Drew Krobath 23 yard pass from Nate Glantz, Logan Seibert kick (Drive: 5 plays, 91 yards, 1:23; GWEB 42–35)

Statistics	LIN	GWEB
First downs	23	32
Total yards	457	491
Rushing yards	213	306
Passing yards	244	185
Passing: Comp–Att–Int	12–27–1	16–21–0
Time of possession	27:44	32:16

Team	Category	Player	Statistics
Lindenwood	Passing	Nate Glantz	12/27, 244 yards, 3 TD, 1 INT
Lindenwood	Rushing	Steve Hall	11 carries, 78 yards, 1 TD
Lindenwood	Receiving	Jeff Caldwell	6 receptions, 174 yards, 1 TD
Gardner–Webb	Passing	Tyler Ridell	16/21, 185 yards, 4 TD
Gardner–Webb	Rushing	Quasean Holmes	26 carries, 156 yards, 1 TD
Gardner–Webb	Receiving	Jordan Bly	4 receptions, 52 yards, 2 TD

=== at No. 6 Southeast Missouri State ===
Game Eight – Gardner–Webb Runnin' Bulldogs (2–5) at No. 6 Southeast Missouri State Redhawks (7–1) – Game summary

Quarter	1	2	3	4	Total
Runnin' Bulldogs	14	0	7	3	24
No. 6 Redhawks	0	21	6	3	30

at Houck Stadium • Cape Girardeau, MO

- Date: Saturday October 26, 2024
- Game time: 3:00 p.m.
- Game attendance: 7,295
- Referee: Michael Lennie
- TV announcers (ESPN+): TBD

Game information

First quarter

- (5:02) GWEB – Edward Saydee 17 yard run, Jay Billingsley kick (Drive: 3 plays, 22 yards, 0:55; GWEB 7–0)
- (4:21) GWEB – Anthony Lowe 14 yard pass from Tyler Ridell, Jay Billingsley kick (Drive: 2 plays, 15 yards, 0:33; GWEB 14–0)

Second quarter

- (14:06) SEMO – Dorian Anderson 3 yard pass from Paxton DeLaurent, DC Pippin kick (Drive: 14 plays, 75 yards, 5:15; GWEB 14–7)
- (12:31) SEMO – Cole Ruble 65 yard run, DC Pippin kick (Drive: 1 play, 65 yards, 0:10; TIED 14–14)
- (1:04) SEMO – Tristan Smith 20 yard pass from Paxton DeLaurent, DC Pippin kick (Drive: 12 plays, 94 yards, 5:08; SEMO 21–14)

Third quarter

- (12:02) SEMO – DC Pippin 45 yard field goal (Drive: 6 plays, 49 yards, 1:11; SEMO 24–14)
- (9:28) GWEB – Edward Saydee 25 yard pass from Tyler Ridell, Jay Billingsley kick (Drive: 6 plays, 77 yards, 2:28; SEMO 24–21)
- (5:03) SEMO – DC Pippin 28 yard field goal (Drive: 12 plays, 61 yards, 4:19; SEMO 27–21)

Fourth quarter

- (10:01) GWEB – Jay Billingsley 35 yard field goal (Drive: 9 plays, 44 yards, 3:59; SEMO 27–24)
- (5:09) SEMO – DC Pippin 37 yard field goal (Drive: 10 plays, 56 yards, 4:52; SEMO 30–24)

Statistics	GWEB	SEMO
First downs	13	25
Total yards	274	432
Rushing yards	107	120
Passing yards	167	312
Passing: Comp–Att–Int	14–31–2	35–58–2
Time of possession	25:56	34:04

Team	Category	Player	Statistics
Gardner–Webb	Passing	Tyler Ridell	14/31, 167 yards, 2 TD, 2 INT
Gardner–Webb	Rushing	Edward Saydee	13 carries, 52 yards, 1 TD
Gardner–Webb	Receiving	Edward Saydee	4 receptions, 84 yards, 1 TD
Southeast Missouri State	Passing	Paxton DeLaurent	35/58, 312 yards, 2 TD, 2 INT
Southeast Missouri State	Rushing	Cole Ruble	16 carries, 122 yards, 1 TD
Southeast Missouri State	Receiving	Dorian Anderson	7 receptions, 80 yards, 1 TD

=== at Charleston Southern ===
Game Nine – Gardner–Webb Runnin' Bulldogs (2–6) at Charleston Southern Buccaneers (1–7) – Game summary

Quarter	1	2	3	4	Total
Runnin' Bulldogs	0	3	7	7	17
Buccaneers	0	0	7	7	14

at Buccaneer Field • Charleston, SC

- Date: Saturday November 2, 2024
- Game time: 2:00 p.m.
- Game weather: Sunny, 82 °F (28 °C)
- Game attendance: 1,977
- TV announcers (ESPN+): Justin Biegel (play-by-play) and Jack Delongchamps (analyst)

Game information

First quarter

Second quarter

Third quarter

Fourth quarter

Statistics	GWEB	CHSO
First downs	24	13
Total yards	346	222
Rushing yards	124	94
Passing yards	222	128
Passing: Comp–Att–Int	19–29–0	13–27–1
Time of possession	37:04	22:56

Team	Category	Player	Statistics
Gardner–Webb	Passing	Tyler Ridell	17/24, 212 yards, 1 TD
Gardner–Webb	Rushing	Edward Saydee	25 carries, 86 yards, 1 TD
Gardner–Webb	Receiving	Taylor Shields	4 receptions, 65 yards, 1 TD
Charleston Southern	Passing	Kaleb Jackson	13/27, 128 yards, 1 INT
Charleston Southern	Rushing	Tyson Greenwade	15 carries, 68 yards, 1 TD
Charleston Southern	Receiving	Noah Jennings	4 receptions, 53 yards

=== vs. Eastern Illinois ===
Game Ten – Eastern Illinois Panthers (2–7) vs Gardner–Webb Runnin' Bulldogs (3–6) – Game summary

Quarter	1	2	3	4	Total
Panthers	0	7	7	14	28
Runnin' Bulldogs	10	14	7	0	31

at Ernest W. Spangler Stadium • Boiling Springs, NC

- Date: Saturday November 9, 2024
- Game time: 3:00 p.m.
- Game weather: Sunny, 67 °F (19 °C)
- Game attendance: 2,451
- Referee: Brad Carrell
- TV announcers (ESPN+): TBD

Game information

First quarter
Second quarter
Third quarter
Fourth quarter

Statistics	EIU	GWEB
First downs	21	25
Total yards	465	464
Rushing yards	7	127
Passing yards	458	337
Passing: Comp–Att–Int	20–36–1	26–34–0
Time of possession	27:46	32:14

Team	Category	Player	Statistics
Eastern Illinois	Passing	Pierce Holley	20/36, 458 yards, 4 TD, 1 INT
Eastern Illinois	Rushing	MJ Flowers	15 carries, 45 yards
Eastern Illinois	Receiving	Cooper Willman	11 receptions, 291 yards, 3 TD
Gardner–Webb	Passing	Tyler Ridell	26/34, 337 yards, 1 TD
Gardner–Webb	Rushing	Carson Gresock	9 carries, 50 yards, 2 TD
Gardner–Webb	Receiving	Taylor Shields	3 receptions, 86 yards

=== vs. Tennessee State ===
Game Eleven – Tennessee State Tigers (7–3) vs Gardner–Webb Runnin' Bulldogs (4–6) – Game summary

Quarter	1	2	3	4	Total
Tigers	13	0	0	10	23
Runnin' Bulldogs	2	7	3	8	20

at Ernest W. Spangler Stadium • Boiling Springs, NC

- Date: Saturday November 16, 2024
- Game time: 4:00 p.m.
- Game weather: Sunny, 60 °F (16 °C)
- Game attendance: 3,763
- Referee: Drew Myers
- TV announcers (ESPN+): TBD

Game information

First quarter

- (10:34) TNST – CJ Evans 23 yard pass from Draylen Ellis, James Lowery kick (Drive: 10 plays, 65 yards, 4:18; TNST 7–0)
- (2:50) TNST – Bryant Williams 17 yard pass from Draylen Ellis (Drive: 12 plays, 82 yards, 6:13; TNST 13–0)
- (2:50) GWEB – Miles Richardson return for defensive PAT (TNST 13–2)

Second quarter

- (9:37) GWEB – Carson Gresock 5 yard run, Jay Billingsley kick (Drive: 18 plays, 75 yards, 8:13; TNST 13–9)

Third quarter

- (2:28) GWEB – Jay Billingsley 40 yard field goal (Drive: 5 plays, 26 yards, 1:01; TNST 13–12)

Fourth quarter

- (14:53) TNST – Jaden McGill 1 yard run, James Lowery kick (Drive: 6 plays, 75 yards, 2:27; TNST 20–12)
- (4:33) TNST – James Lowery 30 yard field goal (Drive: 13 plays, 72 yards, 6:15; TNST 23–12)
- (1:41) GWEB – Edward Saydee 6 yard run, Tyler Ridell pass to Camden Overton for two-point conversion (Drive: 9 plays, 42 yards, 1:09; TNST 23–20)

Statistics	TNST	GWEB
First downs	19	18
Total yards	363	333
Rushing yards	143	126
Passing yards	220	207
Passing: Comp–Att–Int	18–31–0	19–43–1
Time of possession	32:19	27:41

Team	Category	Player	Statistics
Tennessee State	Passing	Draylen Ellis	18/28, 220 yds, 2 TD
Tennessee State	Rushing	Jaden McGill	15 carries, 100 yards, 1 TD
Tennessee State	Receiving	Karate Brenson	8 receptions, 82 yards
Gardner–Webb	Passing	Tyler Ridell	19/43, 207 yds, 1 INT
Gardner–Webb	Rushing	Edward Saydee	18 carries, 68 yards, 1 TD
Gardner–Webb	Receiving	Camden Overton	7 receptions, 74 yards

=== at Western Illinois ===
Game Twelve – Gardner–Webb Runnin' Bulldogs (4–7) vs Western Illinois Leathernecks (3–8) – Game summary

Quarter	1	2	3	4	Total
Runnin' Bulldogs	7	7	14	0	28
Leathernecks	7	7	14	17	45

at Hanson Field • Macomb, IL

- Date: Saturday November 23, 2024
- Game time: 1:00 p.m.
- Game weather: Cloudy, 32 °F (0 °C)
- Game attendance: 2,021
- Referee: Brenden McCain
- TV announcers (ESPN+): TBD

Game information

First quarter

- (8:52) GWEB – Taylor Shields 20 yard pass from Tyler Ridell, Jay Billingsley kick (Drive: 10 plays, 71 yards, 3:46; GWEB 7–0)
- (3:34) WIU – Matthew Henry 17 yard pass from Nathan Lamb, Antonio Chadha kick (Drive: 5 plays, 34 yards, 1:37; TIED 7–7)

Second quarter

- (12:00) WIU – Torrance Farmer Jr. 2 yard run, Antonio Chadha kick (Drive: 9 plays, 54 yards, 2:55; WIU 14–7)
- (0:04) GWEB – Quasean Holmes 1 yard pass from Tyler Ridell, Jay Billingsley kick (Drive: 8 plays, 51 yards, 1:50; TIED 14–14)

Third quarter

- (11:42) WIU – Matthew Henry 46 yard pass from Christian Anaya, Antonio Chadha kick (Drive: 2 plays, 82 yards, 0:46; WIU 21–14)
- (8:14) GWEB – Quasean Holmes 24 yard pass from Tyler Ridell, Jay Billingsley kick (Drive: 1 play, 24 yards, 0:07; TIED 21–21)
- (5:29) WIU – Nathan Lamb 1 yard run, Antonio Chadha kick (Drive: 6 plays, 72 yards, 2:36; WIU 28–21)
- (5:19) GWEB – Carson Gresock 1 yard run, Jay Billingsley kick (Drive: 12 plays, 47 yards, 5:19; TIED 28–28)

Fourth quarter

- (10:45) WIU – Elijah Aragon 23 yard pass from Nathan Lamb, Antonio Chadha kick (Drive: 8 plays, 65 yards, 4:09; WIU 35–28)
- (8:54) WIU – Torrance Farmer Jr. 1 yard run, Antonio Chadha kick (Drive: 3 plays, 11 yards, 1:03; WIU 42–28)
- (3:14) WIU – Antonio Chadha 28 yard field goal (Drive: 8 plays, 54 yards, 3:29; WIU 45–28)

Statistics	GWEB	WIU
First downs	25	21
Total yards	348	511
Rushing yards	55	81
Passing yards	293	430
Passing: Comp–Att–Int	28–47–0	24–34–1
Time of possession	30:56	29:04

Team	Category	Player	Statistics
Gardner–Webb	Passing	Tyler Ridell	23/35, 234 yards, 3 TD
Gardner–Webb	Rushing	Quasean Holmes	9 carries, 24 yards
Gardner–Webb	Receiving	Anthony Lowe	5 receptions, 84 yards
Western Illinois	Passing	Nathan Lamb	23/33, 352 yards, 2 TD, 1 INT
Western Illinois	Rushing	Torrance Farmer Jr.	16 carries, 58 yards, 2 TD
Western Illinois	Receiving	Matthew Henry	6 receptions, 210 yards, 2 TD
