= Jordan Bly =

American football player (born 2002)

Profile
- Position: Wide receiver

Personal information
- Born: December 3, 2002 (age 23)
- Listed height: 6 ft 0 in (1.83 m)
- Listed weight: 175 lb (79 kg)

Career information
- High school: Myers Park (Charlotte, North Carolina)
- College: Old Dominion (2021–2023); Gardner–Webb (2024)
- NFL draft: 2025: undrafted

Career history
- New York Giants (2025)*; Orlando Storm (2026)*; Ottawa Redblacks (2026)*
- * Offseason or practice squad member only

Jordan Bly (born December 3, 2002) is an American professional football wide receiver. He played college football for the Old Dominion Monarchs and the Gardner–Webb Runnin' Bulldogs.

== Early life ==
Bly was born on December 3, 2002. He attended Myers Park High School in Charlotte, North Carolina, and earned first-team all-conference honors his junior year. Bly was a three-star prospect out of high school and committed to play college football at Old Dominion.

== College career ==
Bly played college football for Old Dominion from 2021 to 2023 and Gardner–Webb in 2024. In his first three season at Old Dominion, he played in 30 games and recorded 46 receptions for 394 yards and a touchdown. For his final year of eligibility, he transferred to Gardner–Webb, where he played in five games, logging 16 receptions for 193 yards and a touchdown.

=== College statistics ===
Season	Team	GP	Receiving				Rushing			
Season	Team	GP	Rec	Yds	Lng	TD	Att	Yds	Lng	TD
2021	Old Dominion	11	11	117	37	0	1	10	10	0
2022	Old Dominion	11	22	225	32	0	1	-5	-5	0
2023	Old Dominion	8	13	52	19	1	0	0	0	0
2024	Gardner–Webb	5	16	193	38	1	1	2	2	0
Career		35	62	587	38	2	3	7	10	0

== Professional career ==
Pre-draft measurables
Height	Weight	Arm length	Hand span	40-yard dash	10-yard split	20-yard split	20-yard shuttle	Three-cone drill	Vertical jump	Broad jump	Bench press
5 ft 9 in (1.75 m)	175 lb (79 kg)	30 1/4 in (0.77 m)	8 5/8 in (0.22 m)	4.36 s	1.47 s	2.50 s	4.07 s	6.72 s	36.5 in (0.93 m)	10 ft 7 in (3.23 m)	12 reps
All values from Pro Day

=== New York Giants ===
After not being selected in the 2025 NFL draft, Bly signed with the New York Giants as an undrafted free agent. He was released on August 22, 2025.

=== Orlando Storm ===
On January 14, 2026, Bly was selected by the Orlando Storm in the 2026 UFL Draft. He was released on March 19.

=== Ottawa Redblacks ===
On March 27, 2026, Bly signed with the Ottawa Redblacks of the Canadian Football League. He was released on May 30 as part of final roster cuts.

== Personal life ==
Bly is the son of Super Bowl XXXIV champion and current assistant defensive backs coach for the New York Jets, Dré Bly. His cousins, Josh Downs and Caleb Downs, play for the Indianapolis Colts and Ohio State Buckeyes respectively.
