= Jeff Caldwell (American football) =

American football player (born 2003)

No. 8 – Kansas City Chiefs
- Position: Wide receiver
- Roster status: Injured reserve

Personal information
- Born: March 2, 2003 (age 23)
- Listed height: 6 ft 5 in (1.96 m)
- Listed weight: 215 lb (98 kg)

Career information
- High school: Butler Traditional (Louisville, Kentucky)
- College: Lindenwood (2022–2024); Cincinnati (2025)
- NFL draft: 2026: undrafted

Career history
- Kansas City Chiefs (2026–present)
- Stats at Pro Football Reference

Jeffrey Caldwell (born March 2, 2003) is an American professional football wide receiver. He played college football for the Lindenwood Lions and Cincinnati Bearcats. He went undrafted in the 2026 NFL draft.

== Early life ==
Caldwell is from Louisville, Kentucky. He attended Butler Traditional High School where he initially only intended on playing soccer. He followed after his brother, Frank, and played football, but received little attention as a college recruit. Caldwell had a growth spurt and went from 5 feet 8 inches (1.73 m) as a junior to 6 feet 5 inches (1.96 m) as a senior but still had little attention from colleges. He was an unranked recruit and signed to play college football for the FCS-level Lindenwood Lions, the only team to give him an offer.

== College career ==
In his freshman year at Lindenwood, 2022, Caldwell caught eight passes for 141 yards and four touchdowns. He then recorded 32 catches for 599 yards and eight touchdowns in 2023, being named first-team All-OVC–Big South Football Association. He had his best season at Lindenwood as a junior in 2024, catching 53 passes for 1,032 yards and 11 touchdowns while being named first-team all-conference, second-team All-American and a finalist for the Walter Payton Award, given to the best offensive player at the FCS level.

Caldwell transferred to the Cincinnati Bearcats in 2025. He was named to Bruce Feldman of The Athletic's "Freaks List", highlighting the most athletic college football players. Caldwell was recorded as being able to run over 22 miles per hour while posting a broad jump of 11 feet 9 inches (3.58 m). He caught 32 passes for 478 yards and six touchdowns for Cincinnati. After the season, Caldwell was invited to the NFL Scouting Combine, where he led all wide receivers in the broad jump.

== Professional career ==
Pre-draft measurables
Height	Weight	Arm length	Hand span	Wingspan	40-yard dash	10-yard split	20-yard split	Vertical jump	Broad jump
6 ft 5 3/8 in (1.97 m)	216 lb (98 kg)	32 5/8 in (0.83 m)	9 3/4 in (0.25 m)	6 ft 6 1/8 in (1.98 m)	4.31 s	1.48 s	2.49 s	42.0 in (1.07 m)	11 ft 2 in (3.40 m)
All values from NFL Combine

Despite CBS Sports ranking Caldwell as the No. 167 overall prospect in the 2026 NFL draft and being projected as a fourth-round pick by NFL.com, Caldwell went undrafted. He was signed as an undrafted free agent by the Kansas City Chiefs. On August 24, 2026, Caldwell was waived by the Chiefs with an injury designation.
