= List of Charleston Southern Buccaneers football seasons =

The following is a list of seasons completed by the Charleston Southern Buccaneers football team. The Buccaneers compete in the Big South–OVC Football Association of the NCAA Division I FCS. Initially competing as a member of the NAIA, Charleston Southern gained NCAA Division III status in 1991 and competed at that level for two seasons until becoming a full-fledged Division I member in 1993. After playing as an independent, the Buccaneers joined the Big South in 2002 and have played in the conference ever since.

Charleston Southern has three conference championships to its pedigree, coming in 2005, 2015, and 2016. Charleston Southern has had only six head coaches in their fledgling history. The current head coach is Gabe Giardina. In 2013, Jamey Chadwell led Charleston Southern to a 10–3 record in his first season at the school, which was followed by an 8–4 mark in 2014. In 2015, the Buccaneers made their first ever postseason trip, advancing to the NCAA Division I Quarterfinal before losing to Jacksonville State. They repeated as Big South champions in 2016.

== Seasons ==
Legend

^{†} Conference champions
^{‡} Division champions
Bowl game berth
Playoff berth

List of Charleston Southern Buccaneers football seasons
| Season | Team | Head coach | Conference | Division | Regular season results | | | | | | | Postseason results | Final ranking | |
| Season | Team | Head coach | Conference | Division | Overall | | | Conference | | | | Bowl game/Playoff result | TSN/STATS Poll | Coaches' Poll |
| Season | Team | Head coach | Conference | Division | Win | Loss | Tie | Win | Loss | Tie | Finish | Bowl game/Playoff result | TSN/STATS Poll | Coaches' Poll |
|---|---|---|---|---|---|---|---|---|---|---|---|---|---|---|
Charleston Southern Buccaneers
| 1991 | 1991 | David Dowd | Division III Independent | – | 3 | 7 | 0 | | | | — | — | — | — |
| 1992 | 1992 | David Dowd | Division III Independent | – | 3 | 7 | 0 | | | | — | — | — | — |
| 1993 | 1993 | David Dowd | Division I-AA Independent | – | 3 | 8 | 0 | | | | — | — | — | — |
| 1994 | 1994 | David Dowd | Division I-AA Independent | – | 0 | 11 | 0 | | | | — | — | — | — |
| 1995 | 1995 | David Dowd | Division I-AA Independent | – | 1 | 10 | 0 | | | | — | — | — | — |
| 1996 (Note: Overtime rules were added to college football in 1996, thereby eliminating ties.) | 1996 | David Dowd | Division I-AA Independent | – | 2 | 8 | | | | | — | — | — | — |
| 1997 | 1997 | David Dowd | Division I-AA Independent | – | 1 | 9 | | | | | — | — | — | — |
| 1998 | 1998 | David Dowd | Division I-AA Independent | – | 3 | 8 | | | | | — | — | — | — |
| 1999 | 1999 | David Dowd | Division I-AA Independent | – | 4 | 6 | | | | | — | — | — | — |
| 2000 | 2000 | David Dowd | Division I-AA Independent | – | 5 | 6 | | | | | — | — | — | — |
| 2001 | 2001 | David Dowd | Division I-AA Independent | – | 5 | 6 | | | | | — | — | — | — |
| 2002 | 2002 | David Dowd | Big South | – | 4 | 8 | | 0 | 3 | | 4th | — | — | — |
| 2003 | 2003 | Jay Mills | Big South | – | 1 | 11 | | 0 | 4 | | 5th | — | — | — |
| 2004 | 2004 | Jay Mills | Big South | – | 5 | 5 | | 1 | 3 | | 4th | — | — | — |
| 2005 | 2005^{†} | Jay Mills | Big South | – | 7 | 4 | | 3 | 1 | | T–1st^{†} | — | — | — |
| 2006 | 2006 | Jay Mills | Big South | – | 9 | 2 | | 2 | 2 | | T–2nd | — | — | — |
| 2007 | 2007 | Jay Mills | Big South | – | 5 | 6 | | 1 | 3 | | 4th | — | — | — |
| 2008 | 2008 | Jay Mills | Big South | – | 7 | 5 | | 3 | 2 | | 3rd | — | — | — |
| 2009 | 2009 | Jay Mills | Big South | – | 6 | 5 | | 4 | 2 | | 3rd | — | — | — |
| 2010 | 2010 | Jay Mills | Big South | – | 3 | 8 | | 1 | 5 | | 6th | — | — | — |
| 2011 | 2011 | Jay Mills | Big South | – | 0 | 11 | | 0 | 6 | | 7th | — | — | — |
| 2012 | 2012 | Jay Mills | Big South | – | 5 | 6 | | 3 | 3 | | 4th | — | — | — |
| 2013 | 2013 | Jamey Chadwell | Big South | – | 10 | 3 | | 3 | 2 | | 3rd | — | 24 | — |
| 2014 | 2014 | Jamey Chadwell | Big South | – | 8 | 4 | | 3 | 2 | | T–3rd | — | — | — |
| 2015 | 2015^{†} | Jamey Chadwell | Big South | – | 10 | 3 | | 6 | 0 | | 1st^{†} | NCAA Division I – Quarterfinal | 6 | 7 |
| 2016 | 2016^{†} | Jamey Chadwell | Big South | – | 7 | 4 | | 4 | 1 | | T–1st^{†} | NCAA Division I – First Round | 10 | 10 |
| 2017 | 2017 | Mark Tucker | Big South | – | 6 | 5 | | 3 | 2 | | 3rd | — | — | — |
| 2018 | 2018 | Mark Tucker | Big South | – | 5 | 6 | | 3 | 2 | | 3rd | — | — | — |
| 2019 | 2019 | Autry Denson | Big South | – | 6 | 6 | | 4 | 2 | | 3rd | — | — | — |
| 2020 | 2020 | Autry Denson | Big South | – | 2 | 2 | | 2 | 2 | | 3rd | — | — | — |
| 2021 | 2021 | Autry Denson | Big South | – | 4 | 6 | | 3 | 4 | | T–3rd | — | — | — |
| 2022 | 2022 | Autry Denson | Big South | – | 2 | 8 | | 2 | 3 | | T–3rd | — | — | — |
| 2023 | 2023 | Gabe Giardina | Big South–OVC | – | 4 | 7 | | 2 | 4 | | T–6th | — | — | — |
| 2024 | 2024 | Gabe Giardina | Big South–OVC | – | 1 | 11 | | 0 | 8 | | 9th | — | — | — |
| 2025 | 2025 | Gabe Giardina | Big South–OVC | – | 5 | 7 | | 4 | 4 | | 5th | — | — | — |
| Totals | | | | | All-time: 152–229 (.399) | | | Conference: 57–70 (.449) | | | – | Playoffs: 1–2 (.333) | – | – |
