= 2024 Charleston Southern Buccaneers football team =

American college football season

2024 Charleston Southern Buccaneers football
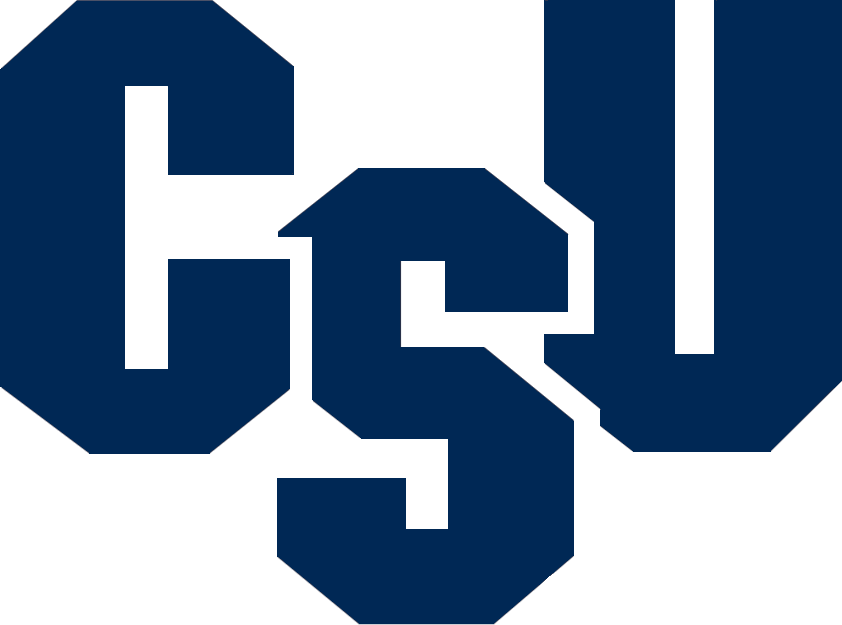
- Conference: Big South–OVC Football Association
- Record: 1–11 (0–8 Big South–OVC)
- Head coach: Gabe Giardina (2nd season)
- Offensive coordinator: Adam Hollifield (2nd season)
- Defensive coordinator: Nick Reveiz (2nd season)
- Home stadium: Buccaneer Field

2024 Big South–OVC football standings
	Conf.			Overall
Team	W		L	W		L
No. 16 Southeast Missouri State +^	6	–	2	9	–	4
Tennessee Tech +	6	–	2	7	–	5
No. 17 UT Martin +^	6	–	2	9	–	5
No. 19 Tennessee State +^	6	–	2	9	–	4
Lindenwood*	4	–	4	5	–	7
Western Illinois	3	–	5	4	–	8
Gardner–Webb	3	–	5	4	–	8
Eastern Illinois	2	–	6	3	–	9
Charleston Southern	0	–	8	1	–	11
+ – Conference co-champions; ^ – FCS playoff participant; Note: Lindenwood ineligible for Big South–OVC title and FCS postseason play due to transition from NCAA Division II.; Rankings from STATS Poll

The 2024 Charleston Southern Buccaneers football team represented Charleston Southern University as a member of the Big South–OVC Football Association during the 2024 NCAA Division I FCS football season. They were led by Gabe Giardina in his second season as head coach. The Buccaneers played their home games at Buccaneer Field in Charleston, South Carolina. They finished the season 1–11, 0–8 in Big South–OVC play to finish in last place.

== Preseason ==
=== Preseason poll ===
The Big South-OVC Conference released their preseason poll on July 17, 2024. The Buccaneers were picked to finish sixth in the conference.

=== Transfers ===
==== Outgoing ====
Player	Position	New school
Brian Cooey	P	Ball State
Bryce Llewellyn	DB	Eastern Michigan
Darius Meeks	OL	Grambling State
King Walker	DL	North Carolina Central
Jamel Johnson	DB	Temple
Garret Cates	LS	USF

==== Incoming ====
Player	Position	Previous school
Kason Hooks	DB	Army
Chris Rhone	WR	Coastal Carolina
David Portu	DL	Coastal Carolina
Robert Wilson	DB	Grambling State
Rob McCoy	QB	Sacred Heart
Justin Waters	LB	Stonehill

== Schedule ==
Date	Time	Opponent	Site	TV	Result	Attendance
August 31	6:00 p.m.	The Citadel*	Buccaneer Field; N. Charleston, SC	ESPN+	L 21–22	5,831
September 7	6:00 p.m.	at No. 15 Furman*	Paladin Stadium; Greenville, SC	ESPN+	W 24–20	8,377
September 14	2:00 p.m.	at Richmond*	Robins Stadium; Richmond, VA	FloSports	L 0–38	6,522
September 28	6:00 p.m.	at Tennessee State	Hale Stadium; Nashville, TN	ESPN+	L 9–13	1,853
October 5	4:00 p.m.	Western Illinois^{†}	Buccaneer Field; N. Charleston, SC	ESPN+	L 20–31	4,015
October 12	2:00 p.m.	at Lindenwood	Harlen C. Hunter Stadium; St. Charles, MO	ESPN+	L 14–29	2,765
October 19	4:00 p.m.	No. 8 Southeast Missouri State	Buccaneer Field; N. Charleston, SC	ESPN+	L 13–26	3,105
October 26	2:30 p.m.	at Tennessee Tech	Tucker Stadium; Cookeville, TN	ESPN+	L 23–28	5,498
November 2	2:00 p.m.	Gardner–Webb	Buccaneer Field; N. Charleston, SC	ESPN+	L 14–17	1,977
November 9	2:00 p.m.	No. 19 UT Martin	Buccaneer Field; N. Charleston, SC	ESPN+	L 14–40	3,614
November 16	1:00 p.m.	at Eastern Illinois	Ernest W. Spangler Stadium; Charleston, IL	ESPN+	L 13–16 ^{OT}	1,895
November 23	1:30 p.m.	at Florida State*	Bobby Bowden Field; Tallahassee, FL	ACCNX/ESPN+	L 7–41	43,711
*Non-conference game; ^{†}Homecoming; Rankings from STATS Poll released prior to the game; All times are in Eastern time

== Game summaries ==
=== The Citadel ===
Game One – The Citadel Bulldogs (0–0) vs Charleston Southern Buccaneers (0–0) – Game summary

Quarter	1	2	3	4	Total
Bulldogs	0	3	12	7	22
Buccaneers	7	7	7	0	21

at Buccaneer Field • North Charleston, SC

- Date: Saturday August 31, 2024
- Game time: 6:00 p.m.
- Game weather: Sunny • Temperature: 87 °F (31 °C) • Wind: N at 9 miles per hour (14 km/h)
- Game attendance: 5,831
- Referee: Branden McCain
- TV announcers (ESPN+): Justin Biegel (play-by-play) and Jack DeLongchamps (analyst)

Game information

First quarter

- (7:03) CHSO – Autavius Ison 3-yard run, Patrick Fisher-Butler kick (Drive: 11 plays, 82 yards, 5:11; Charleston Southern 7–0)

Second quarter

- (2:24) CHSO – Jamil Bishop 64-yard pass from Rob McCoy, Patrick Fisher-Butler kick (Drive: 3 plays, 79 yards, 1:35; Charleston Southern 14–0)
- (1:00) CIT – Ben Barnes 49-yard field goal (Drive: 7 plays, 42 yards, 1:21; Charleston Southern 14–7)

Third quarter

- (10:29) CHSO – Tyson Greenwade 2-yard run, Patrick Fisher-Butler kick (Drive: 7 plays, 73 yards, 4:25; Charleston Southern 21–3)
- (6:20) CIT – Johnathan Bennett 1-yard run (Drive: 9 plays, 70 yards, 4:03; Charleston Southern 21–9)
- (0:00) CIT – Johnny Crawford III 1-yard run (Drive: 8 plays, 72 yards, 3:31; Charleston Southern 21–15)

Fourth quarter

- (1:55) CIT – Garrison Johnson 1-yard run, Ben Barnes kick (Drive: 6 plays, 13 yards, 2:52; The Citadel 22–21)

Statistics	CIT	CHSO
First downs	20	19
Total yards	360	383
Rushing yards	190	93
Passing yards	170	290
Passing: Comp–Att–Int	10–17–0	20–25–0
Time of possession	32:11	27:49

Team	Category	Player	Statistics
The Citadel	Passing	Johnathan Bennett	10/17, 170 yards
The Citadel	Rushing	Corey Ibrahim	16 carries, 68 yards
The Citadel	Receiving	Dervon Pesnell	3 receptions, 86 yards
Charleston Southern	Passing	Rob McCoy	20/25, 290 yards, TD
Charleston Southern	Rushing	Rob McCoy	12 carries, 40 yards
Charleston Southern	Receiving	Chris Rhone	5 receptions, 90 yards

=== at No. 15 Furman ===
Game Two – Charleston Southern Buccaneers (0–1) at No. 15 Furman Paladins (0–2) – Game summary

Quarter	1	2	3	4	Total
Buccaneers	6	8	7	3	24
No. 15 Paladins	0	10	7	3	20

at Paladin Stadium • Greenville, SC

- Date: Saturday September 7, 2024
- Game time: 6:00 p.m.
- Game weather: Sunny, 75 °F (24 °C)
- Game attendance: 8,377
- Referee: Brian Holland
- TV announcers (ESPN+): Brock Bowling (play-by-play) and Cole Neely (analyst)

Game information

First quarter
Second quarter
Third quarter
Fourth quarter

Statistics	CHSO	FUR
First downs	14	20
Total yards	257	336
Rushing yards	114	101
Passing yards	143	235
Passing: Comp–Att–Int	12–23–0	18–35–2
Time of possession	27:53	32:07

Team	Category	Player	Statistics
Charleston Southern	Passing	Rob McCoy Jr	12/23, 143 yards, 2 TD
Charleston Southern	Rushing	Autavius Ison	19 carries, 90 yards, 1 TD
Charleston Southern	Receiving	Noah Jennings	7 receptions, 97 yards, 2 TD
Furman	Passing	Trey Hedden	12/25, 193 yards, 1 TD, 1 INT
Furman	Rushing	Myion Hicks	14 carries, 68 yards, 1 TD
Furman	Receiving	Ben Ferguson	3 receptions, 108 yards

=== at Richmond ===
Game Three – Charleston Southern Buccaneers (1–1) at Richmond Spiders (0–2) – Game summary

Quarter	1	2	3	4	Total
Buccaneers	0	0	0	0	0
Spiders	7	14	14	3	38

at E. Claiborne Robins Stadium • Richmond, VA

- Date: Saturday September 14, 2024
- Game time: 2:00 p.m.
- Game weather: Sunny
- Game attendance: 6,522
- Referee: Jeremy DeAngulo
- TV announcers (FloSports/MSN): Bob Black (play-by-play), Chris Anderson (analyst) and Anna Camden (sideline)

Game information

First quarter
Second quarter
Third quarter
Fourth quarter

Statistics	CHSO	RICH
First downs	10	18
Total yards	131	370
Rushing yards	39	213
Passing yards	92	157
Passing: Comp–Att–Int	11–24–2	13–15–0
Time of possession	26:12	33:48

Team	Category	Player	Statistics
Charleston Southern	Passing	Zolten Osborne	10/19, 81 yards, 2 INT
Charleston Southern	Rushing	Autavius Ison	13 carries, 49 yards
Charleston Southern	Receiving	Quay Kindell	2 receptions, 26 yards
Richmond	Passing	Kyle Wickersham	10/12, 128 yards, 1 TD
Richmond	Rushing	Zach Palmer-Smith	21 carries, 80 yards, 2 TD
Richmond	Receiving	Nick DeGennaro	5 receptions, 71 yards, 1 TD

=== at Tennessee State ===
Game Four – Charleston Southern Buccaneers (1–2) at Tennessee State Tigers (2–2) – Game summary

Quarter	1	2	3	4	Total
Buccaneers	0	6	3	0	9
Tigers	0	7	0	6	13

at Nissan Stadium • Nashville, TN

- Date: Saturday September 28, 2024
- Game time: 6:00 p.m.
- Game weather: Rain, 67 °F (19 °C)
- Game attendance: 1,853
- Referee: Drew Myers
- TV announcers (ESPN+): Dan Laing (play-by-play) and Chris Sanders (analyst)

Game information

First quarter
Second quarter
Third quarter
Fourth quarter

Statistics	CHSO	TNST
First downs	17	11
Total yards	309	206
Rushing yards	219	101
Passing yards	90	105
Passing: Comp–Att–Int	4–12–0	12–25–0
Time of possession	41:29	18:31

Team	Category	Player	Statistics
Charleston Southern	Passing	Kaleb Jackson	4/12, 90 yards
Charleston Southern	Rushing	Autavius Ison	33 carries, 157 yards
Charleston Southern	Receiving	Chris Rhone	2 receptions, 39 yards
Tennessee State	Passing	Draylen Ellis	12/24, 105 yards, 1 TD
Tennessee State	Rushing	Jordan Gant	5 carries, 40 yards, 1 TD
Tennessee State	Receiving	Bryant Williams	5 receptions, 49 yards, 1 TD

=== Western Illinois ===
Game Five – Western Illinois Leathernecks (1–3) vs Charleston Southern Buccaneers (1–3) – Game summary

Quarter	1	2	3	4	Total
Leathernecks	14	7	7	3	31
Buccaneers	0	13	0	7	20

at Buccaneer Field • North Charleston, SC

- Date: Saturday October 5, 2024
- Game time: 4:00 p.m.
- Game weather: Sunny, 81 °F (27 °C)
- Game attendance: 4,014
- Referee: John Kellermeier
- TV announcers (ESPN+): Justin Biegel (play-by-play) and Jack Delongchamps (analyst)

Game information

First quarter
Second quarter
Third quarter
Fourth quarter

Statistics	WIU	CHSO
First downs	17	21
Total yards	329	431
Rushing yards	132	325
Passing yards	197	106
Passing: Comp–Att–Int	17–23–1	9–17–2
Time of possession	23:28	36:32

Team	Category	Player	Statistics
Western Illinois	Passing	Nathan Lamb	17/23, 197 yards, 2 TD, 1 INT
Western Illinois	Rushing	Cameren Smith	25 carries, 101 yards, 1 TD
Western Illinois	Receiving	Elijah Aragon	10 receptions, 129 yards, 1 TD
Charleston Southern	Passing	Rob McCoy Jr	9/17, 106 yards, 1 TD, 2 INT
Charleston Southern	Rushing	Autavius Ison	29 carries, 229 yards, 2 TD
Charleston Southern	Receiving	Noah Jennings	4 receptions, 44 yards, 1 TD

=== at Lindenwood ===
Game Six – Charleston Southern Buccaneers (1–4) vs Lindenwood Lions (2–4) – Game summary

Quarter	1	2	3	4	Total
Buccaneers	0	14	0	0	14
Lions	10	10	3	6	29

at Harlen C. Hunter Stadium • St. Charles, MO

- Date: Saturday October 12, 2024
- Game time: 2:00 p.m.
- Game weather: Sunny, 83 °F (28 °C)
- Game attendance: 2,765
- Referee: Brad Carrell
- TV announcers (ESPN+): Justin Biegel (play-by-play) and Jack Delongchamps (analyst)

Game information

First quarter
Second quarter
Third quarter
Fourth quarter

Statistics	CHSO	LIN
First downs	8	25
Total yards	197	392
Rushing yards	98	240
Passing yards	99	152
Passing: Comp–Att–Int	15–29–2	12–25–1
Time of possession	19:35	40:25

Team	Category	Player	Statistics
Charleston Southern	Passing	Rob McCoy Jr	14/23, 98 yards, 2 INT
Charleston Southern	Rushing	Autavius Ison	14 carries, 77 yards
Charleston Southern	Receiving	Chris Rhone	4 receptions, 46 yards
Lindenwood	Passing	Nate Glantz	12/25, 152 yards, 1 INT
Lindenwood	Rushing	Nate Glantz	18 carries, 103 yards
Lindenwood	Receiving	Jeff Caldwell	2 receptions, 52 yards

=== No. 8. Southeast Missouri State ===
Game Seven – No. 8 Southeast Missouri State Redhawks (6–1) vs Charleston Southern Buccaneers (1–4) – Game summary

Quarter	1	2	3	4	Total
No. 8 Redhawks	6	10	7	3	26
Buccaneers	0	7	6	0	13

at Buccaneer Field • North Charleston, SC

- Date: Saturday October 19, 2024
- Game time: 4:00 p.m.
- Game weather: Sunny, 71 °F (22 °C)
- Game attendance: 3,105
- Referee: Gabriel Tomlin
- TV announcers (ESPN+): Justin Biegel (play-by-play) and Jack Delongchamps (analyst)

Game information

First quarter

- (11:35) SEMO – DC Pippin 25 yard field goal (Drive: 7 plays, 35 yards, 2:07; SEMO 3–0)
- (4:04) SEMO – DC Pippin 24 yard field goal (Drive: 10 plays, 57 yards, 2:53; SEMO 6–0)

Second quarter

- (14:52) CHSO – Chris Rhone 26 yard pass from NAME, NAME kick (Drive: 7 plays, 75 yards, 4:12; CHSO 7–6)
- (12:16) SEMO – DC Pippin 34 yard field goal (Drive: 10 plays, 59 yards, 2:36; SEMO 9–7)
- (0:09) SEMO – Tristan Smith 1 yard run, NAME kick (Drive: 19 plays, 83 yards, 5:09; SEMO 16–7)

Third quarter

- (10:38) SEMO – Kyron Downing 20 yard pass from NAME, NAME kick (Drive: 7 plays, 79 yards, 2:07; SEMO 23–7)
- (0:00) CHSO – Chris Rhone 44 yard pass from NAME (Drive: 7 plays, 77 yards, 3:28; SEMO 23–13)

Fourth quarter

- (11:12) SEMO – DC Pippin 27 yard field goal (Drive: 10 plays, 67 yards, 3:42; SEMO 26–13)

Statistics	SEMO	CHSO
First downs	28	12
Total yards	415	255
Rushing yards	80	108
Passing yards	335	147
Passing: Comp–Att–Int	32–55–0	12–18–0
Time of possession	33:43	26:17

Team	Category	Player	Statistics
Southeast Missouri State	Passing	Paxton DeLaurent	32/55, 335 yards, 1 TD
Southeast Missouri State	Rushing	Jacorey Love	12 carries, 65 yards
Southeast Missouri State	Receiving	Tristan Smith	7 receptions, 90 yards
Charleston Southern	Passing	Kaleb Jackson	9/15, 125 yards, 2 TD
Charleston Southern	Rushing	Autavius Ison	11 carries, 44 yards
Charleston Southern	Receiving	Chris Rhone	6 receptions, 98 yards, 2 TD

=== at Tennessee Tech ===
Game Eight – Charleston Southern Buccaneers (1–6) vs Tennessee Tech Golden Eagles (2–5) – Game summary

Quarter	1	2	3	4	Total
Buccaneers	7	0	14	2	23
Golden Eagles	3	16	0	9	28

at Tucker Stadium • Cookeville, TN

- Date: Saturday October 26, 2024
- Game time: 2:30 p.m.
- Game weather: Cloudy, 72 °F (22 °C)
- Game attendance: 5,498
- Referee: Zach Erdmann
- TV announcers (ESPN+): Dylan Vazzano (play-by-play) and Sam Brooks (analyst)

Game information

First quarter
Second quarter
Third quarter
Fourth quarter

Statistics	CHSO	TTU
First downs	15	16
Total yards	335	343
Rushing yards	122	168
Passing yards	213	175
Passing: Comp–Att–Int	14–29–2	9–16–0
Time of possession	31:25	28:35

Team	Category	Player	Statistics
Charleston Southern	Passing	Kaleb Jackson	14/29, 213 yds, 1 TD, 2 INT
Charleston Southern	Rushing	Tyson Greenwade	24 carries, 95 yards, 1 TD
Charleston Southern	Receiving	Chris Rhone	3 receptions, 129 yards, 1 TD
Tennessee Tech	Passing	Dylan Laible	9/16, 175 yds, 2 TD
Tennessee Tech	Rushing	Jalen Mitchell	15 carries, 94 yards
Tennessee Tech	Receiving	D.J. Linkins	3 receptions, 106 yards, 1 TD

=== Gardner–Webb ===
Game Nine – Gardner–Webb Runnin' Bulldogs (2–6) at Charleston Southern Buccaneers (1–7) – Game summary

Quarter	1	2	3	4	Total
Runnin' Bulldogs	0	3	7	7	17
Buccaneers	0	0	7	7	14

at Buccaneer Field • Charleston, SC

- Date: Saturday November 2, 2024
- Game time: 2:00 p.m.
- Game weather: Sunny, 82 °F (28 °C)
- Game attendance: 1,977
- TV announcers (ESPN+): Justin Biegel (play-by-play) and Jack Delongchamps (analyst)

Game information

First quarter

Second quarter

Third quarter

Fourth quarter

Statistics	GWEB	CHSO
First downs	24	13
Total yards	346	222
Rushing yards	124	94
Passing yards	222	128
Passing: Comp–Att–Int	19–29–0	13–27–1
Time of possession	37:04	22:56

Team	Category	Player	Statistics
Gardner–Webb	Passing	Tyler Ridell	17/24, 212 yards, 1 TD
Gardner–Webb	Rushing	Edward Saydee	25 carries, 86 yards, 1 TD
Gardner–Webb	Receiving	Taylor Shields	4 receptions, 65 yards, 1 TD
Charleston Southern	Passing	Kaleb Jackson	13/27, 128 yards, 1 INT
Charleston Southern	Rushing	Tyson Greenwade	15 carries, 68 yards, 1 TD
Charleston Southern	Receiving	Noah Jennings	4 receptions, 53 yards

=== No. 19 UT Martin ===
Game Ten – No. 19 UT Martin Skyhawks (6–3) at Charleston Southern Buccaneers (1–8) – Game summary

Quarter	1	2	3	4	Total
No. 19 Skyhawks	16	3	14	7	40
Buccaneers	7	0	0	7	14

at Buccaneer Field • North Charleston, SC

- Date: Saturday November 9, 2024
- Game time: 2:00 p.m.
- Game weather: Sunny, 75 °F (24 °C)
- Game attendance: 3,614
- Referee: Brandon McCain
- TV announcers (ESPN+): Justin Biegel (play-by-play) and Jack Delongchamps (analyst)

Game information

First quarter

- (8:06) UTM – Jaren Van Winkle 44 yard field goal (Drive: 10 plays, 42 yards, 4:22; UTM 3–0)
- (7:08) CHSO – Jamil Bishop 54 yard run, Reid Montgomery kick (Drive: 2 plays, 66 yards, 0:52; CHSO 7–3)
- (6:57) UTM – DeVonte Tanksley 65 yard pass from Kinkead Dent (Drive: 1 play, 65 yards, 0:11; UTM 9–7)
- (2:31) UTM – Kinkead Dent 4 yard run, Jaren Van Winkle kick (Drive: 5 plays, 66 yards, 2:43; UTM 16–7)

Second quarter

- (9:00) UTM – Jaren Van Winkle 24 yard field goal (Drive: 13 plays, 65 yards, 5:47; UTM 19–7)

Third quarter

- (7:43) UTM – DeVonte Tanksley 36 yard pass from Kinkead Dent, Jaren Van Winkle kick (Drive: 14 plays, 92 yards, 7:10; UTM 26–7)
- (6:51) UTM – Tevin Shipp 30 yard interception return, Jaren Van Winkle kick (Drive: 2 plays, 72 yards, 0:47; UTM 33–7)

Fourth quarter

- (6:45) UTM – Chris Franklin 43 yard run, Jaren Van Winkle kick (Drive: 3 plays, 52 yards, 1:42; UTM 40–7)
- (2:30) CHSO – Chris Rhone 13 yard pass from Kaleb Jackson, Reid Montgomery kick (Drive: 5 plays, 51 yards, 1:54; UTM 40–14)

Statistics	UTM	CHSO
First downs	21	12
Total yards	491	209
Rushing yards	237	94
Passing yards	254	115
Passing: Comp–Att–Int	13–26–0	14–27–3
Time of possession	33:06	26:17

Team	Category	Player	Statistics
UT Martin	Passing	Kinkead Dent	13/26, 254 yards, 2 TD
UT Martin	Rushing	Patrick Smith	15 carries, 123 yards
UT Martin	Receiving	DeVonte Tanksley	5 receptions, 128 yards, 2 TD
Charleston Southern	Passing	Rob McCoy Jr	12/23, 97 yards, 3 INT
Charleston Southern	Rushing	Autavius Ison	14 carries, 42 yards
Charleston Southern	Receiving	Noah Jennings	6 receptions, 52 yards

=== at Eastern Illinois ===
Game Eleven – Charleston Southern Buccaneers (1–9) vs Eastern Illinois Panthers (2–8) – Game summary

Quarter	1	2	3	4	OT	Total
Buccaneers	0	6	0	7	0	13
Panthers	0	13	0	0	3	16

at O'Brien Field • Charleston, IL

- Date: Saturday November 16, 2024
- Game time: 1:00 p.m.
- Game weather: Sunny, 50 °F (10 °C)
- Game attendance: 1,895
- Referee: Zach Erdmann
- TV announcers (ESPN+): Mike Bradd (play-by-play) and Dave Kidwell (analyst)

Game information

First quarter

No scoring plays

Second quarter

- (14:55) CHSO – Reid Montgomery 37 yard field goal (Drive: 8 plays, 24 yards, 4:56; CHSO 3–0)
- (4:58) CHSO – Reid Montgomery 39 yard field goal (Drive: 4 plays, 4 yards, 1:29; CHSO 6–0)
- (1:36) EIU – MJ Flowers 2 yard run, Julian Patino kick (Drive: 10 plays, 75 yards, 3:22; EIU 7–6)
- (0:36) EIU – Alex Herrera 18 yard pass from Pierce Holley (Drive: 3 plays, 21 yards, 0:27; EIU 13–6)

Third quarter

No scoring plays

Fourth quarter

- (4:52) CHSO – Jamil Bishop 15 yard run, Reid Montgomery kick (Drive: 1 play, 15 yards, 0:08; TIED 13–13)

Overtime

- EIU – Julian Patino 18 yard field goal (Drive: 7 plays, 24 yards; EIU 16–13)

Statistics	CHSO	EIU
First downs	11	17
Total yards	201	232
Rushing yards	125	64
Passing yards	76	168
Passing: Comp–Att–Int	10–19–0	17–26–2
Time of possession	27:05	27:34

Team	Category	Player	Statistics
Charleston Southern	Passing	Rob McCoy Jr.	7/13, 52 yards
Charleston Southern	Rushing	Autavius Ison	12 carries, 42 yards
Charleston Southern	Receiving	Chris Rhone	1 reception, 18 yards
Eastern Illinois	Passing	Pierce Holley	17/23, 168 yards, 1 TD, 2 INT
Eastern Illinois	Rushing	MJ Flowers	22 carries, 73 yards, 1 TD
Eastern Illinois	Receiving	Quenton Rogers	5 receptions, 66 yards

=== at Florida State (FBS) ===
Game Twelve – Charleston Southern Buccaneers (1–10) vs Florida State Seminoles (FBS) (1–9) – Game summary

Quarter	1	2	3	4	Total
Buccaneers	0	0	0	7	7
Seminoles (FBS)	0	17	14	10	41

at Doak Campbell Stadium • Tallahassee, FL

- Date: Saturday November 23, 2024
- Game time: 1:30 p.m.
- Game weather: Sunny, 64 °F (18 °C)
- Game attendance: 43,711
- Referee: Stuart Mullins
- TV announcers (ACCNX/ESPN+): Shawn Kenney (play-by-play) and Forrest Conoly (analyst)

Game information

First quarter

- No scoring plays

Second quarter

- (13:42) FSU – Ryan Fitzgerald 25-yard field goal (Drive: 7 plays, 46 yards, 3:08; FSU 3–0)
- (4:05) FSU – Luke Kromenhoek 4-yard pass to Amaree Williams (Ryan Fitzgerald kick) (Drive: 6 plays, 24 yards, 2:44; FSU 10–0)
- (0:26) FSU – Caziah Holmes 3-yard run (Ryan Fitzgerald kick) (Drive: 8 plays, 67 yards, 1:48; FSU 17–0)

Third quarter

- (14:42) FSU – Luke Kromenhoek 71-yard pass to Ja'Khi Douglas (Ryan Fitzgerald kick) (Drive: 1 play, 71 yards, 0:13; FSU 24–0)
- (7:47) FSU – Luke Kromenhoek 10-yard pass to Hykeem Williams (Ryan Fitzgerald kick) (Drive: 7 plays, 80 yards, 4:06; FSU 31–0)

Fourth quarter

- (14:55) FSU – Jake Weinberg 23-yard field goal (Drive: 7 plays, 12 yards, 3:25; FSU 34–0)
- (5:24) FSU – Caziah Holmes 18-yard run (Ryan Fitzgerald kick) (Drive: 7 plays, 76 yards, 3:27; FSU 41–0)
- (0:57) CSU – Kaleb Jackson 7-yard pass to Landon Sauers (Reid Montgomery kick) (Drive: 12 plays, 75 yards, 4:27; FSU 41–7)

Statistics	CHSO	FSU
First downs	18	20
Total yards	275	415
Rushing yards	57	175
Passing yards	218	240
Passing: Comp–Att–Int	22–32–1	16–23–0
Time of possession	33:05	26:55

Team	Category	Player	Statistics
Charleston Southern	Passing	Kaleb Jackson	22/32, 218 yards, 1 TD, 1 INT
Charleston Southern	Rushing	Autavius Ison	13 carries, 28 yards
Charleston Southern	Receiving	Chris Rhone	3 receptions, 60 yards
Florida State	Passing	Luke Kromenhoek	13/20, 209 yards, 3 TD
Florida State	Rushing	Kam Davis	9 carries, 39 yards
Florida State	Receiving	Ja'Khi Douglas	3 receptions, 82 yards, 1 TD
