= 2024 UT Martin Skyhawks football team =

American college football season

2024 UT Martin Skyhawks football

Big South–OVC co-champion

NCAA Division I Second Round, L 17–49 at Montana State
- Conference: Big South–OVC football

Ranking
- STATS: No. 17
- FCS Coaches: No. 18
- Record: 9–5 (6–2 Big South–OVC)
- Head coach: Jason Simpson (19th season)
- Offensive coordinator: Kevin Bannon (9th season)
- Defensive coordinator: Brandon Butcher (2nd season)
- Home stadium: Graham Stadium

2024 Big South–OVC football standings
	Conf.			Overall
Team	W		L	W		L
No. 16 Southeast Missouri State +^	6	–	2	9	–	4
Tennessee Tech +	6	–	2	7	–	5
No. 17 UT Martin +^	6	–	2	9	–	5
No. 19 Tennessee State +^	6	–	2	9	–	4
Lindenwood*	4	–	4	5	–	7
Western Illinois	3	–	5	4	–	8
Gardner–Webb	3	–	5	4	–	8
Eastern Illinois	2	–	6	3	–	9
Charleston Southern	0	–	8	1	–	11
+ – Conference co-champions; ^ – FCS playoff participant; Note: Lindenwood ineligible for Big South–OVC title and FCS postseason play due to transition from NCAA Division II.; Rankings from STATS Poll

The 2024 UT Martin Skyhawks football team represented the University of Tennessee at Martin as a member of the Big South–OVC Football Association during the 2024 NCAA Division I FCS football season. Led by 19th-year head coach Jason Simpson, the Skyhawks played their home games at Graham Stadium in Martin, Tennessee.

== Preseason ==
=== Preseason poll ===
The Big South-OVC Conference released their preseason poll on July 17, 2024. The Skyhawks were picked to finish first in the conference.

=== Preseason All–Big South-OVC Teams ===
The Big South-OVC announced the 2024 preseason all-conference football team selections on August 2, 2024. UTM had a total of thirteen players selected.

Offense

1st Team

- Narkel LeFlore – Running back, SR
- DeVonte Tanksley – Wide receiver, SR
- Drake Carroll – Offensive lineman, SR

2nd Team

- Kinkead Dent – Quarterback, SR
- Zoe Roberts – Wide receiver, SR
- Josiah Tingley – Offensive lineman, JR
- Vance Van Every – Offensive lineman, SR

Defense

1st Team

- Jaylon Sharpe – Linebacker, SR
- Oshae Baker – Defensive back, SR
- JaMichael McGoy Jr. – Defensive back, JR

2nd Team

- Josh Hastings – Defensive back, SR

3rd Team

- Charles Perkins – Defensive lineman, SO

Special Teams

1st Team

- Narkel LeFlore – Kick returner and all-purpose, SR

2nd Team

- Oshae Baker – Punt returner, SR
- Colton Peoples – Long snapper, SR

=== Transfers ===
==== Outgoing ====
Player	Position	New school
Jordan Castleberry	RB	Akron
DJ Nelson	TE	Alabama A&M
Cornelious Brown IV	QB	Alabama A&M
David Stewart	OLB	Chattanooga
Giovanni Davis	DL	FIU
Aidan Laros	K/P	Kentucky
Sam Franklin	RB	Oklahoma
Brett Kuczynski	LB	Stetson
Daylan Dotson	DL	UCF
Austin Bray	TE	Youngstown State

==== Incoming ====
Player	Position	Previous school
Dashaun Davis	WR	Appalachian State
Deshawn McKnight	DL	Appalachian State
Chris Rhodes	DB	Arkansas
Jai’Lun Hampton	OL	Charlotte
Doug Newsome	DB	Charlotte
Mario Eugenio	DL	Cincinnati
Xavier McIver	DL	East Carolina
Julian Calvez	QB	Grambling State
Keyshawn Johnson	DL	Grambling State
Edward Smith	WR	Grambling State
Tyler Dostin	TE	Kent State
Kaiya Sheron	QB	Kentucky
Preston Yarber	OL	Lamar
Elijah Bowser	OL	Louisiana Tech
Bryce Bailey	WR	Middle Tennessee
Dolapo Egunjobi	OL	North Dakota
Robert Johnson	DB	North Texas
Jamarii Robinson	WR	Northern Colorado
Hyatt Timosciek	TE	Northern Illinois
Devin Queen	WR	Old Dominion
Scottie Alexander	WR	Tulsa
Jaden Moore	LB	Tulsa
Patrick Smith	RB	Vanderbilt
Rashad Raymond	RB	VMI

== Schedule ==
Date	Time	Opponent	Rank	Site	TV	Result	Attendance
August 31	6:00 p.m.	at No. 18 (FBS) Kansas State*		Bill Snyder Family Football Stadium; Manhattan, KS	ESPN+	L 6–41	51,240
September 7	6:00 p.m.	at Southeast Missouri State		Houck Stadium; Cape Girardeau, MO	ESPN+	L 42–45 ^{2OT}	6,127
September 14	6:00 p.m.	North Alabama*		Graham Stadium; Martin, TN	ESPN+	W 43–28	3,417
September 21	6:00 p.m.	Missouri State*		Graham Stadium; Martin, TN	ESPN+	L 24–31	3,985
September 28	5:00 p.m.	at Kennesaw State*		Fifth Third Bank Stadium; Kennesaw, GA	ESPN+	W 24–13	10,847
October 5	2:00 p.m.	Gardner–Webb^{†}		Graham Stadium; Martin, TN	ESPN+	W 35–17	6,101
October 12	3:00 p.m.	at Western Illinois	No. 25т	Hanson Field; Macomb, IL	ESPN+	W 45–17	3,264
October 26	2:00 p.m.	Eastern Illinois		Graham Stadium; Martin, TN	ESPN+	W 52–17	4,109
November 2	5:00 p.m.	at No. 25 Tennessee State		Nissan Stadium; Nashville, TN (Sgt. York Trophy)	ESPN+	W 28–21	2,845
November 9	1:00 p.m.	at Charleston Southern	No. 19	Buccaneer Field; North Charleston, SC	ESPN+	W 40–14	3,614
November 16	2:00 p.m.	Tennessee Tech	No. 18	Graham Stadium; Martin, TN (Sgt. York Trophy)	ESPN+	L 9–10	2,914
November 23	2:00 p.m.	Lindenwood	No. 22	Graham Stadium; Martin, TN	ESPN+	W 33–26 ^{OT}	2,208
November 30	12:00 p.m.	at No. 19 New Hampshire*	No. 23	Wildcat Stadium; Durham, NH (NCAA Division I First Round)	ESPN+	W 41–10	1,573
December 7	1:00 p.m.	at No. 1 Montana State*	No. 23	Bobcat Stadium; Bozeman, MT (NCAA Division I Second Round)	ESPN+	L 17–49	17,017
*Non-conference game; ^{†}Homecoming; Rankings from STATS Poll released prior to the game; All times are in Central time

== Game summaries ==
=== at No. 18 (FBS) Kansas State ===
Game One – UT Martin Skyhawks (0–0) at No. 18 (FBS) Kansas State Wildcats (0–0) – Game summary

Quarter	1	2	3	4	Total
Skyhawks	0	3	3	0	6
No. 18 (FBS) Wildcats	14	3	10	14	41

at Bill Snyder Family Stadium • Manhattan, KS

- Date: Saturday August 31, 2024
- Game time: 6:00 p.m.
- Game weather: Sunny, 85 °F (29 °C)
- Game attendance: 51,240
- Referee: Luke Richmond
- TV announcers (ESPN+): Mark Neely (play-by-play) and Ahman Green (analyst)

Game information

First quarter

- (6:30) KSU – Brayden Loftin 23 yard pass from Avery Johnson, Chris Tennant kick (Drive: 7 plays, 80 yards, 3:00; KSU 7–0)
- (4:24) KSU – Colby McCalister 1 yard punt return, Chris Tennant kick (Drive: 3 plays, -8 yards, 2:06; KSU 14–0)

Second quarter

- (7:16) UTM – Jaren Van Winkle 34 yard field goal (Drive: 8 plays, 51 yards, 5:27; KSU 14–3)
- (0:21) KSU – Chris Tennant 43 yard field goal (Drive: 7 plays, 40 yards, 3:02; KSU 17–3)

Third quarter

- (9:29) UTM – Jaren Van Winkle 31 yard field goal (Drive: 10 plays, 20 yards, 5:23; KSU 17–6)
- (5:39) KSU – Chris Tennant 45 yard field goal (Drive: 9 plays, 48 yards, 3:50; KSU 20–6)
- (0:59) KSU – Dylan Edwards 1 yard run, Chris Tennant kick (Drive: 6 plays, 71 yards, 2:27; KSU 27–6)

Fourth quarter

- (14:29) KSU – Dylan Edwards 15 yard pass from Avery Johnson, Chris Tennant kick (Drive: 2 plays, 63 yards, 0:31; KSU 34–6)
- (8:19) KSU – La'James White 12 yard run, Chris Tennant kick (Drive: 6 plays, 65 yards, 2:57; KSU 41–6)

Statistics	UTM	KSU
First downs	8	20
Total yards	134	449
Rushing yards	36	283
Passing yards	98	166
Passing: Comp–Att–Int	10-17-0	16-25-1
Time of possession	33:30	26:30

Team	Category	Player	Statistics
UT Martin	Passing	Kinkead Dent	7/14, 87 yards
UT Martin	Rushing	Patrick Smith	9 carries, 23 yards
UT Martin	Receiving	Trevonte Rucker	1 reception, 45 yards
Kansas State	Passing	Avery Johnson	14/24, 153 yds, 2 TD, 1 INT
Kansas State	Rushing	D.J. Giddens	13 carries, 128 yards
Kansas State	Receiving	Jayce Brown	5 receptions, 71 yards

=== at Southeast Missouri State ===
Game Two – UT Martin Skyhawks (0–1) at Southeast Missouri State Redhawks (1–1) – Game summary

Quarter	1	2	3	4	OT	2OT	Total
Skyhawks	0	14	14	7	7	0	42
Redhawks	7	7	7	14	7	3	45

at Houck Stadium • Cape Girardeau, MO

- Date: Saturday September 7, 2024
- Game time: 6:00 p.m.
- Game weather: Sunny, 72 °F (22 °C)
- Game attendance: 6,127
- Referee: Branden McCain
- TV announcers (ESPN+): Erik Sean, Rick Weiser

Game information

First quarter

- (4:42) SEMO – Tristan Smith 17 yard pass from Paxton DeLaurent, DC Pippin kick (Drive: 3 plays, 36 yards, 1:37; SEMO 0–7)

Second quarter

- (8:14) UTM – Trevonte Rucker 20 yard pass from Kinkead Dent, Jaren Van Winkle kick (Drive: 7 plays, 47 yards, 3:46; TIED 7–7)
- (3:31) UTM – Trevonte Rucker 3 yard pass from Kinkead Dent, Jaren Van Winkle kick (Drive: 7 plays, 55 yards, 3:29; UTM 14–7)
- (1:40) SEMO – Dorian Anderson 18 yard pass from Paxton DeLaurent, DC Pippin kick (Drive: 6 plays, 75 yards, 1:51; TIED 14–14)

Third quarter

- (12:00) SEMO – Dorian Anderson 20 yard pass from Paxton DeLaurent, DC Pippin kick (Drive: 8 plays, 70 yards, 2:56; SEMO 14–21)
- (7:16) UTM – Tyler Dostin 24 yard pass from Kinkead Dent, Jaren Van Winkle kick (Drive: 8 plays, 75 yards, 4:44; TIED 21–21)
- (3:59) UTM – Patrick Smith 29 yard run, Jaren Van Winkle kick (Drive: 4 plays, 43 yards, 1:32; UTM 28–21)

Fourth quarter

- (12:35) UTM – Rashad Raymond 1 yard run, Jaren Van Winkle kick (Drive: 9 plays, 90 yards, 4:21; UTM 35–21)
- (8:30) SEMO – Mitchell Sellers 5 yard pass from Paxton DeLaurent, DC Pippin kick (Drive: 6 plays, 52 yards, 1:32; UTM 35–28)
- (0:39) SEMO – Mitchell Sellers 10 yard pass from Paxton DeLaurent, DC Pippin kick (Drive: 8 plays, 45 yards, 1:43; TIED 35–35)

First overtime

- (0:00) SEMO – Mitchell Sellers 11 yard pass from Paxton DeLaurent, DC Pippin kick (Drive: 4 plays, 25 yards; SEMO 35–42)
- (0:00) UTM – Asa Wondeh 7 yard pass from Kinkead Dent, Jaren Van Winkle kick (Drive: 4 plays, 25 yards; TIED 42–42)

Second overtime

- (0:00) SEMO – DC Pippin 37 yard field goal (SEMO 42–45)

Statistics	UTM	SEMO
First downs	22	24
Total yards	470	365
Rushing yards	193	-11
Passing yards	277	376
Passing: Comp–Att–Int	23–33–0	34–64–0
Time of possession	38:13	21:47

Team	Category	Player	Statistics
UT Martin	Passing	Kinkead Dent	23/33, 277 yards, 4 TD
UT Martin	Rushing	Patrick Smith	26 carries, 148 yards, 1 TD
UT Martin	Receiving	DeVonte Tanksley	7 receptions, 113 yards
Southeast Missouri State	Passing	Paxton DeLaurent	34/63, 376 yards, 6 TD
Southeast Missouri State	Rushing	Payton Brown	2 carries, 3 yards
Southeast Missouri State	Receiving	Dorian Anderson	8 receptions, 127 yards, 2 TD

=== vs. North Alabama ===
Game Three – North Alabama Lions (0–3) at UT Martin Skyhawks (0–2) – Game summary

Quarter	1	2	3	4	Total
Lions	18	7	3	0	28
Skyhawks	10	10	16	7	43

at Graham Stadium • Martin, TN

- Date: Saturday September 14, 2024
- Game time: 6:00 p.m.
- Game attendance: 3,417 E at 6 miles per hour (9.7 km/h) • Weather: Cloudy • Temp: 71 °F (22 °C)
- Referee: Drew Myers
- TV announcers (ESPN+): Davis Gregory (play-by-play), John Halter, and Chris Brinkley (analysts)

Game information

First quarter

- (13:28) UNA – Takairee Kenebrew 78-yard pass from DC Tabscott (Nathan Curry pass from Ben Harris) (Drive: 3 plays, 80 yards, 1:27; UNA 8-0)
- (10:17) UNA – Takairee Kenebrew 8-yard pass from DC Tabscott (Scott Payne kick) (Drive: 4 plays, 54 yards, 1:40; UNA 15-0)
- (6:46) UNA – Scott Payne 45-yard field goal (Drive: 5 plays, 17 yards, 1:53; UNA 18-0)
- (1:51) UTM – Jaren Van Winkle 38-yard field goal (Drive: 6 plays, 75 yards, 2:28; UNA 18-3)
- (0:07) UTM – Trevonte Rucker 8-yard pass from Kinkead Dent (Jaren Van Winkle kick) (Drive: 2 plays, 8 yards, 0:27; UNA 18-10)

Second quarter

- (5:06) UTM – Patrick Smith 5-yard rush (Jaren Van Winkle kick) (Drive: 3 plays, 30 yards, 1:08; UNA 18-17)
- (1:19) UNA – Jayvian Allen 5-yard rush (Scott Payne kick) (Drive: 9 plays, 60 yards, 3:39; UNA 25-17)
- (0:00) UTM – Jaren Van Winkle 46-yard field goal (Drive: 8 plays, 46 yards, 1:19; UNA 25-20)

Third quarter

- (13:22) UTM – Jayvian Allen sacked for a safety (Drive: 1 play, 0 yards, 0:04; UNA 25-22)
- (10:24) UTM – Trevonte Rucker 10-yard pass from Kaiya Sheron (Jaren Van Winkle kick) (Drive: 6 plays, 53 yards, 2:50; UTM 29-25)
- (6:03) UNA – Scott Payne 23-yard field goal (Drive: 14 plays, 68 yards, 4:21; UTM 29-28)
- (2:08) UTM – Patrick Smith 1-yard rush (Jaren Van Winkle kick) (Drive: 7 plays, 75 yards, 3:55; UTM 36-28)

Fourth quarter

- (5:28) UTM – Tevin Shipp 34-yard interception return (Jaren Van Winkle kick) (Drive: 1 play, 0 yards, 0:14; UTM 43-28)

Statistics	UNA	UTM
First downs	16	21
Total yards	377	416
Rushing yards	122	193
Passing yards	255	223
Passing: Comp–Att–Int	14-33-3	18-35-2
Time of possession	27:48	32:12

Team	Category	Player	Statistics
North Alabama	Passing	DC Tabscott	6/13, 149 yards, 2 TD, 2 INT
North Alabama	Rushing	Dennis Moody	6 carries, 53 yards
North Alabama	Receiving	Takairee Kenebrew	5 receptions, 173 yards, 2 TD
UT Martin	Passing	Kaiya Sheron	14/18, 170 yards, 1 TD
UT Martin	Rushing	Patrick Smith	15 carries, 123 yards, 2 TD
UT Martin	Receiving	Trevonte Rucker	6 receptions, 83 yards, 2 TD

=== vs. Missouri State ===
Game Four – Missouri State Bears (1–2) at UT Martin Skyhawks (1–2) – Game summary

Quarter	1	2	3	4	Total
Bears	0	10	14	7	31
Skyhawks	7	0	7	10	24

at Graham Stadium, Martin, TN

- Date: Saturday September 21, 2024
- Game time: 6:00 p.m. CDT
- Game weather: Cloudy, 84 °F (29 °C)
- Game attendance: 3,985
- Referee: Brad Carrell
- TV announcers (ESPN+): Davis Gregory, John Hatler, Chris Brinkley

Game information

First quarter

- (6:28) UTM – Max Dowling 9 yard pass from Kaiya Sheron, Jaren Van Winkle kick (Drive: 5 plays, 65 yards, 3:01; UTM 7–0)

Second quarter

- (11:01) MOST – Yousef Obeid 33 yard field goal (Drive: 7 plays, 30 yards, 3:06; UTM 7–3)
- (0:05) MOST – Hunter Wood 1 yard pass from Jacob Clark, Yousef Obeid kick (Drive: 7 plays, 90 yards, 0:48; MOST 10–7)

Third quarter

- (11:21) MOST – Jacardia Wright 5 yard run, Yousef Obeid kick (Drive: 8 plays, 75 yards, 3:39; MOST 17–7)
- (7:51) MOST – DVontae Key 35 yard pass from Jacob Clark, Yousef Obeid kick (Drive: 1 plays, 35 yards, 0:09; MOST 24–7)
- (3:38) UTM – Patrick Smith 8 yard run, Jaren Van Winkle kick (Drive: 8 plays, 75 yards, 4:13; MOST 24–14)

Fourth quarter

- (12:50) MOST – Connor Lair 3 yard pass from Jacob Clark, Yousef Obeid kick (Drive: 5 plays, 18 yards, 1:53; MOST 31–14)
- (7:20) UTM – Tyler Dostin 12 yard pass from Kaiya Sheron, Jaren Van Winkle kick (Drive: 10 plays, 75 yards, 5:30; MOST 31–21)
- (2:24) UTM – Jaren Van Winkle 31 yard field goal (Drive: 9 plays, 44 yards, 2:13; MOST 31–24)

Statistics	MOST	UTM
First downs	19	19
Total yards	403	308
Rushing yards	15	95
Passing yards	388	213
Passing: Comp–Att–Int	26–34–0	20–28–0
Time of possession	30:06	29:54

Team	Category	Player	Statistics
Missouri State	Passing	Jacob Clark	26/33, 388 yards, 3 TD
Missouri State	Rushing	Jacardia Wright	16 carries, 22 yards, 1 TD
Missouri State	Receiving	Lance Mason	3 receptions, 94 yards
UT Martin	Passing	Kaiya Sheron	20/27, 213 yards, 2 TD
UT Martin	Rushing	Patrick Smith	16 carries, 63 yards, 1 TD
UT Martin	Receiving	Trevonte Rucker	6 receptions, 73 yards

=== at (FBS) Kennesaw State ===
Game Five – Kennesaw State Owls (FBS) (0–3) vs UT Martin Skyhawks (1–2) – Game summary

Quarter	1	2	3	4	Total
Skyhawks	0	10	14	0	24
Owls (FBS)	0	10	0	3	13

at Fifth Third Stadium • Kennesaw, GA

- Date: Saturday September 28, 2024
- Game time: 5:00 p.m. CDT
- Game weather: Cloudy, 72 °F (22 °C)
- Game attendance: 10,847
- Referee: Rodney Burnette
- TV announcers (ESPN+): Stan Lewter (play-by-play), Nolan Alexander (analyst), and Jade Barkett (sideline)

Game information

First quarter

No scoring plays

Second quarter

- (14:50) UTM – Patrick Smith 7 yard run, Jaren Van Winkle kick (Drive: 15 plays, 68 yards, 7:29; UTM 7–0)
- (8:28) KENN – Jayven Williams 48 yard interception return, Austin Welch kick (Drive: 2 plays, 19 yards, 0:40; TIE 7–7)
- (0:59) UTM – Jaren Van Winkle 24 yard field goal (Drive: 6 plays, 62 yards, 1:05; UTM 10–7)
- (0:00) KENN – Austin Welch 49 yard field goal (Drive: 10 plays, 38 yards, 0:53; TIE 10–10)

Third quarter

- (10:13) UTM – Oshae Baker 63 yard interception return, Jaren Van Winkle kick (Drive: 9 plays, 33 yards, 4:47; UTM 17–10)
- (1:40) UTM – Patrick Smith 21 yard run, Jaren Van Winkle kick (Drive: 11 plays, 72 yards, 6:50; UTM 24–10)

Fourth quarter

- (11:07) KENN – Austin Welch 38 yard field goal (Drive: 11 plays, 52 yards, 5:27; UTM 24–13)

Statistics	UTM	KENN
First downs	16	13
Total yards	292	215
Rushing yards	160	66
Passing yards	132	149
Passing: Comp–Att–Int	13–23–1	17–35–2
Time of possession	31:11	28:49

Team	Category	Player	Statistics
UT Martin	Passing	Kinkead Dent	13/23, 132 yards, INT
UT Martin	Rushing	Patrick Smith	24 carries, 123 yards, 2 TD
UT Martin	Receiving	Tyler Dostin	3 receptions, 41 yards
Kennesaw State	Passing	Davis Bryson	16/34, 132 yards, 2 INT
Kennesaw State	Rushing	Davis Bryson	6 carries, 27 yards
Kennesaw State	Receiving	Blake Bohannon	4 receptions, 54 yards

=== vs. Gardner–Webb ===
Game Six – Gardner–Webb Runnin' Bulldogs (1–4) at UT Martin Skyhawks (2–3) – Game summary

Quarter	1	2	3	4	Total
Runnin' Bulldogs	3	0	0	14	17
Skyhawks	7	14	14	0	35

at Graham Stadium • Martin, TN

- Date: Saturday October 5, 2024
- Game time: 2:00 p.m.
- Game weather: Sunny, 87 °F (31 °C)
- Game attendance: 6,101
- Referee: Zach Erdmann
- TV announcers (ESPN+): Mike Guerriere, Chris Hughes

Game information

First quarter

- (8:59) GWEB – Jay Billingsley 46 yard field goal (Drive: 9 plays, 45 yards, 3:56; GWEB 3–0)
- (3:02) UTM – Patrick Smith 1 yard run, Jaren Van Winkle kick (Drive: 12 plays, 72 yards, 5:50; UTM 7–3)

Second quarter

- (9:20) UTM – Tyler Dostin 55 yard pass from Kinkead Dent, Jaren Van Winkle kick (Drive: 1 play, 55 yards, 0:09; UTM 14–3)
- (5:09) UTM – Patrick Smith 4 yard run, Jaren Van Winkle kick (Drive: 5 plays, 34 yards, 2:40; UTM 21–3)

Third quarter

- (8:06) UTM – Kinkead Dent 4 yard run, Jaren Van Winkle kick (Drive: 7 plays, 80 yards, 4:02; UTM 28–3)
- (0:23) UTM – Patrick Smith 30 yard run, Jaren Van Winkle kick (Drive: 6 plays, 80 yards, 2:41; UTM 35–3)

Fourth quarter

- (6:24) GWEB – Carson Gresock 3 yard run, Jay Billingsley kick (Drive: 6 plays, 44 yards, 2:48; UTM 35–10)
- (1:44) GWEB – Quasean Holmes 8 yard pass from Tyler Ridell, Jay Billingsley kick (Drive: 4 plays, 73 yards, 1:00; UTM 35–17)

Statistics	GWEB	UTM
First downs	17	21
Total yards	303	402
Rushing yards	146	235
Passing yards	157	167
Passing: Comp–Att–Int	15–24–1	15–25–0
Time of possession	29:21	30:39

Team	Category	Player	Statistics
Gardner–Webb	Passing	Tyler Ridell	10/14, 145 yards, 1 TD, 1 INT
Gardner–Webb	Rushing	Edward Saydee	17 carries, 112 yards
Gardner–Webb	Receiving	Giovanni Adopte	3 receptions, 52 yards
UT Martin	Passing	Kinkead Dent	15/23, 167 yards, 1 TD
UT Martin	Rushing	Patrick Smith	15 carries, 128 yards, 3 TD
UT Martin	Receiving	Tyler Dostin	3 receptions, 66 yards, 1 TD

=== at Western Illinois ===
Game Seven – No. 25т UT Martin Skyhawks (3–3) vs Western Illinois Leathernecks (2–3) – Game summary

Quarter	1	2	3	4	Total
No. 25т Skyhawks	14	14	14	3	45
Leathernecks	3	0	0	14	17

at Hanson Field • Macomb, IL

- Date: Saturday October 12, 2024
- Game time: 3:00 p.m.
- Game weather: Sunny, 85 °F (29 °C)
- Game attendance: 3,264
- Referee: Matthew Jones
- TV announcers (ESPN+): Russ Eisenstein, Cannon Wynkoop, Caden Kratz

Game information

First quarter

- (13:57) UTM – Max Dowling 48 yard pass from Kinkead Dent, Jaren Van Winkle kick (Drive: 3 plays, 75 yards, 1:03; UTM 7–0)
- (5:16) WIU – Antonio Chadha 47 yard field goal (Drive: 10 plays, 61 yards, 3:51; UTM 7–3)
- (1:00) UTM – Kinkead Dent 1 yard run, Jaren Van Winkle kick (Drive: 10 plays, 72 yards, 4:10; UTM 14–3)

Second quarter

- (10:59) UTM – Glover Cook III 33 yard run, Jaren Van Winkle kick (Drive: 7 plays, 69 yards, 3:44; UTM 21–3)
- (5:51) UTM – Max Dowling 21 yard pass from Kinkead Dent, Jaren Van Winkle kick (Drive: 4 plays, 86 yards, 2:12; UTM 28–3)

Third quarter

- (6:12) UTM – Patrick Smith 10 yard run, Jaren Van Winkle kick (Drive: 7 plays, 61 yards, 3:35; UTM 35–3)
- (2:46) UTM – Kinkead Dent 5 yard run, Jaren Van Winkle kick (Drive: 5 plays, 25 yards, 2:15; UTM 42–3)

Fourth quarter

- (12:29) UTM – Jaren Van Winkle 23 yard field goal (Drive: 9 plays, 60 yards, 3:14; UTM 45–3)
- (8:11) WIU – Cameren Smith 2 yard run, Antonio Chadha kick (Drive: 11 plays, 75 yards, 4:18; UTM 45–10)
- (0:31) WIU – Demari Davis 20 yard pass from Chris Irvin, Antonio Chadha kick (Drive: 9 plays, 65 yards, 1:25; UTM 45–17)

Statistics	UTM	WIU
First downs	27	18
Total yards	541	294
Rushing yards	306	40
Passing yards	235	254
Passing: Comp–Att–Int	20–28–1	27–49–0
Time of possession	32:09	27:51

Team	Category	Player	Statistics
UT Martin	Passing	Kinkead Dent	16/21, 194 yards, 2 TD
UT Martin	Rushing	Patrick Smith	17 carries, 145 yards, 1 TD
UT Martin	Receiving	Max Dowling	3 receptions, 88 yards, 2 TD
Western Illinois	Passing	Nathan Lamb	20/33, 158 yards
Western Illinois	Rushing	Cameren Smith	13 carries, 27 yards, 1 TD
Western Illinois	Receiving	Tristin Duncan	4 receptions, 45 yards

=== vs. Eastern Illinois ===
Game Eight – Eastern Illinois Panthers (1–6) vs UT Martin Skyhawks (4–3) – Game summary

Quarter	1	2	3	4	Total
Panthers	7	3	7	0	17
Skyhawks	7	14	10	21	52

at Graham Stadium • Martin, TN

- Date: Saturday October 26, 2024
- Game time: 2:00 p.m.
- Game weather: Cloudy, 67 °F (19 °C)
- Game attendance: 4,109
- Referee: Gabe Tomlin
- TV announcers (ESPN+): Davis Gregory, John Hatler, Chris Brinkley

Game information

First quarter

- (11:55) EIU – Cooper Willman 7 yard pass from Pierce Holley, Julian Patino kick (Drive: 7 plays, 75 yards, 3:05; EIU 7–0)
- (3:55) UTM – Max Dowling 33 yard pass from Kinkead Dent, Jaren Van Winkle kick (Drive: 2 plays, 33 yards, 0:44; TIE 7–7)

Second quarter

- (13:36) UTM – Kinkead Dent 37 yard run, Jaren Van Winkle kick (Drive: 7 plays, 74 yards, 3:28; UTM 14–7)
- (10:30) UTM – Patrick Smith 3 yard run, Jaren Van Winkle kick (Drive: 3 plays, 37 yards, 1:19; UTM 21–7)
- (3:40) EIU – Julian Patino 19 yard field goal (Drive: 15 plays, 73 yards, 6:50; UTM 21–10)

Third quarter

- (12:29) UTM – Patrick Smith 1 yard run, Jaren Van Winkle kick (Drive: 5 plays, 47 yards, 2:20; UTM 28–10)
- (5:21) EIU – Alex Herrera 17 yard pass from Pierce Holley, Julian Patino kick (Drive: 6 plays, 66 yards, 2:47; UTM 28–17)
- (3:16) UTM – Jaren Van Winkle 31 yard field goal (Drive: 5 plays, 57 yards, 2:05; UTM 31–17)

Fourth quarter

- (10:35) UTM – Max Dowling 21 yard pass from Kinkead Dent, Jaren Van Winkle kick (Drive: 5 plays, 87 yards, 3:06; UTM 38–17)
- (9:37) UTM – Tyler Dostin 14 yard pass from Kinkead Dent, Jaren Van Winkle kick (Drive: 2 plays, 21 yards, 0:43; UTM 45–17)
- (6:28) UTM – Jaylon Sharpe 72 yard interception return, Jaren Van Winkle kick (Drive: 8 plays, 45 yards, 3:09; UTM 52–17)

Statistics	EIU	UTM
First downs	23	20
Total yards	396	460
Rushing yards	48	212
Passing yards	348	248
Passing: Comp–Att–Int	36–54–3	16–23–0
Time of possession	32:16	27:44

Team	Category	Player	Statistics
Eastern Illinois	Passing	Pierce Holley	36/54, 348 yards, 2 TD, 3 INT
Eastern Illinois	Rushing	MJ Flowers	14 carries, 49 yards
Eastern Illinois	Receiving	Cooper Willman	11 receptions, 143 yards, 1 TD
UT Martin	Passing	Kinkead Dent	16/22, 248 yards, 3 TD
UT Martin	Rushing	Patrick Smith	13 carries, 87 yards, 2 TD
UT Martin	Receiving	Max Dowling	3 receptions, 70 yards, 2 TD

=== at No. 25 Tennessee State ===
Game Nine – UT Martin Skyhawks (5–3) at No. 25 Tennessee State Tigers (6–2) – Game summary

Quarter	1	2	3	4	Total
Skyhawks	21	7	0	0	28
No. 25 Tigers	14	0	7	0	21

at Nissan Stadium • Nashville, TN

- Date: Saturday November 2, 2024
- Game time: 5:00 p.m.
- Game weather: Sunny, 72 °F (22 °C)
- Game attendance: 2,845
- Referee: Zach Erdmann
- TV announcers (ESPN+): Dan Laing, Chris Sanders

Game information

First quarter

- (13:09) UTM – DeVonte Tanksley 35 yard pass from Kinkead Dent, Jaren Van Winkle kick (Drive: 4 plays, 67 yards, 1:44; UTM 7–0)
- (11:00) UTM – Zoe Roberts 33 yard pass from Kinkead Dent, Jaren Van Winkle kick (Drive: 2 plays, 55 yards, 0:39; UTM 14–0)
- (5:59) UTM – Scottie Alexander 33 yard pass from Kinkead Dent, Jaren Van Winkle kick (Drive: 6 plays, 79 yards, 2:55; UTM 21–0)
- (5:44) TNST – CJ Evans 98 yard kickoff return, James Lowery kick (UTM 21–7)
- (0:46) TNST – Bryant Williams 43 yard pass from Draylen Ellis, James Lowery kick (Drive: 6 plays, 92 yards, 2:20; UTM 21–14)

Second quarter

- (0:57) UTM – Kinkead Dent 3 yard run, Jaren Van Winkle kick (Drive: 11 plays, 91 yards, 5:23; UTM 28–14)

Third quarter

- (1:09) TNST – Jalal Dean 2 yard pass from Draylen Ellis, James Lowery kick (Drive: 5 plays, 32 yards, 2:00; UTM 28–21)

Fourth quarter

No scoring plays

Statistics	UTM	TNST
First downs	22	25
Total yards	370	354
Rushing yards	104	42
Passing yards	266	312
Passing: Comp–Att–Int	18–27–1	33–54–2
Time of possession	30:35	29:25

Team	Category	Player	Statistics
UT Martin	Passing	Kinkead Dent	18/27, 266 yds, 3 TD, 1 INT
UT Martin	Rushing	Patrick Smith	16 carries, 73 yards
UT Martin	Receiving	Tyler Dostin	4 receptions, 87 yards
Tennessee State	Passing	Draylen Ellis	33/53, 153 yds, 2 TD, 2 INT
Tennessee State	Rushing	Draylen Ellis	5 carries, 29 yards
Tennessee State	Receiving	Jalal Dean	11 receptions, 118 yards, 1 TD

=== at Charleston Southern ===
Game Ten – No. 19 UT Martin Skyhawks (6–3) at Charleston Southern Buccaneers (1–8) – Game summary

Quarter	1	2	3	4	Total
No. 19 Skyhawks	16	3	14	7	40
Buccaneers	7	0	0	7	14

at Buccaneer Field • North Charleston, SC

- Date: Saturday November 9, 2024
- Game time: 1:00 p.m.
- Game weather: Sunny, 75 °F (24 °C)
- Game attendance: 3,614
- Referee: Brandon McCain
- TV announcers (ESPN+): Justin Biegel, Jack Delongchamps

Game information

First quarter

- (8:06) UTM – Jaren Van Winkle 44 yard field goal (Drive: 10 plays, 42 yards, 4:22; UTM 3–0)
- (7:08) CSOU – Jamil Bishop 54 yard run, Reid Montgomery kick (Drive: 2 plays, 66 yards, 0:52; CSOU 7–3)
- (6:57) UTM – DeVonte Tanksley 65 yard pass from Kinkead Dent (Drive: 1 play, 65 yards, 0:11; UTM 9–7)
- (2:31) UTM – Kinkead Dent 4 yard run, Jaren Van Winkle kick (Drive: 5 plays, 66 yards, 2:43; UTM 16–7)

Second quarter

- (9:00) UTM – Jaren Van Winkle 24 yard field goal (Drive: 13 plays, 65 yards, 5:47; UTM 19–7)

Third quarter

- (7:43) UTM – DeVonte Tanksley 36 yard pass from Kinkead Dent, Jaren Van Winkle kick (Drive: 14 plays, 92 yards, 7:10; UTM 26–7)
- (6:51) UTM – Tevin Shipp 30 yard interception return, Jaren Van Winkle kick (Drive: 2 plays, 72 yards, 0:47; UTM 33–7)

Fourth quarter

- (6:45) UTM – Chris Franklin 43 yard run, Jaren Van Winkle kick (Drive: 3 plays, 52 yards, 1:42; UTM 40–7)
- (2:30) CSOU – Chris Rhone 13 yard pass from Kaleb Jackson, Reid Montgomery kick (Drive: 5 plays, 51 yards, 1:54; UTM 40–14)

Statistics	UTM	CHSO
First downs	21	12
Total yards	491	209
Rushing yards	237	94
Passing yards	254	115
Passing: Comp–Att–Int	13–26–0	14–27–3
Time of possession	33:06	26:17

Team	Category	Player	Statistics
UT Martin	Passing	Kinkead Dent	13/26, 254 yards, 2 TD
UT Martin	Rushing	Patrick Smith	15 carries, 123 yards
UT Martin	Receiving	DeVonte Tanksley	5 receptions, 128 yards, 2 TD
Charleston Southern	Passing	Rob McCoy Jr	12/23, 97 yards, 3 INT
Charleston Southern	Rushing	Autavius Ison	14 carries, 42 yards
Charleston Southern	Receiving	Noah Jennings	6 receptions, 52 yards

=== vs. Tennessee Tech ===
Game Eleven – Tennessee Tech Golden Eagles (5–5) at No. 18 UT Martin Skyhawks (7–3) – Game summary

Quarter	1	2	3	4	Total
Golden Eagles	10	0	0	0	10
No. 18 Skyhawks	0	0	0	9	9

at Graham Stadium • Martin, TN

- Date: Saturday November 16, 2024
- Game time: 2:00 p.m.
- Game weather: Sunny, 63 °F (17 °C)
- Game attendance: 2,914
- Referee: Michael Lennie
- TV announcers (ESPN+): Davis Gregory, John Hatler, Chris Brinkley

Game information

First quarter

- (10:01) TNTC – Jalen Mitchell 15 yard run, Dom LeBlanc kick (Drive: 8 plays, 64 yards, 4:06; TNTC 7–0)
- (7:12) TNTC – Dom LeBlanc 24 yard field goal (Drive: 4 plays, 3 yards, 1:30; TNTC 10–0)

Second quarter

No scoring plays

Third quarter

No scoring plays

Fourth quarter

- (8:07) UTM – Cam Robertson 40 yard return of blocked punt, Jaren Van Winkle kick (Drive: 3 plays, 2 yards, 2:23; TNTC 10–7)
- (0:14) UTM – Spencer Ashby -21 yard run for a safety (Drive: 4 plays, 1 yard, 0:16; TNTC 10–9)

Statistics	TNTC	UTM
First downs	13	9
Total yards	247	185
Rushing yards	107	43
Passing yards	140	142
Passing: Comp–Att–Int	16–31–1	13–32–2
Time of possession	33:14	26:46

Team	Category	Player	Statistics
Tennessee Tech	Passing	Dylan Laible	15/29, 128 yds, 1 INT
Tennessee Tech	Rushing	Jalen Mitchell	11 carries, 62 yards, 1 TD
Tennessee Tech	Receiving	D.J. Linkins	3 receptions, 56 yards
UT Martin	Passing	Kinkead Dent	13/32, 142 yds, 2 INT
UT Martin	Rushing	Kinkead Dent	13 carries, 20 yards
UT Martin	Receiving	Trevonte Rucker	2 receptions, 51 yards

=== vs. Lindenwood ===
Game Twelve – Lindenwood Lions (5–6) at No. 22 UT Martin Skyhawks (7–4) – Game summary

Quarter	1	2	3	4	OT	Total
Lions	6	7	5	8	0	26
No. 22 Skyhawks	0	7	13	6	7	33

at Graham Stadium • Martin, TN

- Date: Saturday November 23, 2024
- Game time: 2:00 p.m.
- Game weather: Sunny, 52 °F (11 °C)
- Game attendance: 2,208
- Referee: Drew Myers
- TV announcers (ESPN+): Davis Gregory, John Hatler, Chris Brinkley

Game information

First quarter

- (10:39) LIN – Jeff Caldwell 21 yard run (Drive: 3 plays, 70 yards, 1:41; LIN 6–0)

Second quarter

- (11:40) LIN – Nate Glantz 2 yard run, Logan Seibert kick (Drive: 13 plays, 90 yards, 6:38; LIN 13–0)
- (2:35) UTM – Trevonte Rucker 23 yard pass from Kinkead Dent, Jaren Van Winkle kick (Drive: 7 plays, 95 yards, 3:46; LIN 13–7)

Third quarter

- (12:53) LIN – Logan Seibert 50 yard field goal (Drive: 5 plays, 43 yards, 2:03; LIN 16–7)
- (7:21) UTM – Trevonte Rucker 38 yard pass from Kinkead Dent, Jaren Van Winkle PAT blocked, returned for 2-point defensive conversion (Drive: 1 play, 38 yards, 0:07; LIN 18–13)
- (1:45) UTM – Patrick Smith 22 yard run, Jaren Van Winkle kick (Drive: 5 plays, 86 yards, 2:52; UTM 20–18)

Fourth quarter

- (10:45) UTM – Glover Cook III 2 yard run (Drive: 8 plays, 78 yards, 4:59; UTM 26–18)
- (0:32) LIN – Jared Rhodes 13 yard run, Nate Glantz pass to Jeff Caldwell for two-point conversion (Drive: 14 plays, 93 yards, 3:37; TIED 26–26)

Overtime

- UTM – Tyler Dostin 1 yard pass from Kinkead Dent, Jaren Van Winkle kick (Drive: 5 plays, 25 yards; UTM 33–26)

Statistics	LIN	UTM
First downs	21	20
Total yards	425	445
Rushing yards	98	173
Passing yards	327	272
Passing: Comp–Att–Int	27–45–2	18–27–1
Time of possession	30:44	29:16

Team	Category	Player	Statistics
Lindenwood	Passing	Nate Glantz	27/45, 327 yards, 2 INT
Lindenwood	Rushing	Nate Glantz	17 carries, 42 yards, 1 TD
Lindenwood	Receiving	Jeff Caldwell	7 receptions, 78 yards
UT Martin	Passing	Kinkead Dent	18/27, 272 yards, 3 TD, 1 INT
UT Martin	Rushing	Patrick Smith	15 carries, 80 yards, 1 TD
UT Martin	Receiving	Trevonte Rucker	5 receptions, 87 yards, 2 TD

=== at No. 19 New Hampshire (NCAA Division I Playoff–First Round) ===
NCAA Division I Playoff–First Round – No. 23 UT Martin Skyhawks (8–4) at No. 19 New Hampshire Wildcats (8–4) – Game summary

Quarter	1	2	3	4	Total
No. 23 Skyhawks	7	20	0	14	41
No. 19 Wildcats	7	0	3	0	10

at Wildcat Stadium • Durham, NH

- Date: Saturday November 30, 2024
- Game time: 12:00 p.m.
- Game weather: Sunny, 39 °F (4 °C)
- Game attendance: 1,573
- Referee: Travis Barta
- TV announcers (ESPN+): Robert Lee (play-by-play) and Marcus Ray (analyst)

Game information

First quarter

- (6:59) UTM – Rashad Raymond 4 yard run, Jaren Van Winkle kick (Drive: 12 plays, 62 yards, 5:44; UTM 7–0)
- (6:45) UNH – Caleb Mead 95 yard kickoff return, Nick Mazzie kick (TIED 7–7)

Second quarter

- (13:50) UTM – Jaren Van Winkle 30 yard field goal (Drive: 7 plays, 22 yards, 3:27; UTM 10–7)
- (10:38) UTM – Patrick Smith 3 yard run, Jaren Van Winkle kick (Drive: 6 plays, 81 yards, 2:51; UTM 17–7)
- (2:36) UTM – Kinkead Dent 2 yard run, Jaren Van Winkle kick (Drive: 8 plays, 80 yards, 3:33; UTM 24–7)
- (0:13) UTM – Jaren Van Winkle 36 yard field goal (Drive: 6 plays, 45 yards, 1:30; UTM 27–7)

Third quarter

- (6:42) UNH – Nick Mazzie 41 yard field goal (Drive: 10 plays, 40 yards, 4:20; UTM 27–10)

Fourth quarter

- (12:46) UTM – Trevonte Rucker 4 yard run, Jaren Van Winkle kick (Drive: 6 plays, 39 yards, 3:41; UTM 34–10)
- (7:07) UTM – Glover Cook III 1 yard run, Jaren Van Winkle kick (Drive: 6 plays, 41 yards, 3:33; UTM 41–10)

Statistics	UTM	UNH
First downs	22	6
Total yards	482	124
Rushing yards	236	53
Passing yards	246	71
Passing: Comp–Att–Int	17–27–0	14–35–1
Time of possession	38:03	19:46

Team	Category	Player	Statistics
UT Martin	Passing	Kinkead Dent	17/26, 246 yds
UT Martin	Rushing	Patrick Smith	15 carries, 71 yards, 1 TD
UT Martin	Receiving	Trevonte Rucker	9 receptions, 88 yards
New Hampshire	Passing	Seth Morgan	14/35, 71 yds, 1 INT
New Hampshire	Rushing	Caleb Mead	5 carries, 36 yards
New Hampshire	Receiving	Caleb Burke	3 receptions, 23 yards

=== at No. 1 Montana State (NCAA Division I Playoff–Second Round) ===
NCAA Division I Playoff–Second Round – No. 23 UT Martin Skyhawks (9–4) at No. 1 Montana State (12–0) – Game summary

Quarter	1	2	3	4	Total
No. 23 Skyhawks	0	10	0	7	17
No. 1 Bobcats	14	14	14	7	49

at Bobcat Stadium • Bozeman, MT

- Date: Saturday December 7, 2024
- Game time: 1:00 p.m.
- Game weather: Sunny, 50 °F (10 °C)
- Game attendance: 17,017
- Referee: Jason Perkins
- TV announcers (ESPN+): Jason Ross Jr. (play-by-play) and Tyoka Jackson (analyst)

Game information

First quarter

- (12:24) MTST – Hunter Provience 24 yard pass from Tommy Mellott, Myles Sansted kick (Drive: 5 plays, 75 yards, 2:36; MTST 7–0)
- (4:22) MTST – Taco Dowler 12 yard pass from Tommy Mellott, Myles Sansted kick (Drive: 3 plays, 58 yards, 0:58; MTST 14–0)

Second quarter

- (12:09) MTST – Ty McCullouch 6 yard run, Myles Sansted kick (Drive: 10 plays, 84 yards, 5:47; MTST 21–0)
- (5:37) UTM – Jaren Van Winkle 37 yard field goal (Drive: 14 plays, 56 yards, 6:32; MTST 21–3)
- (2:02) UTM – Trevonte Rucker 78 yard pass from Kinkead Dent, Jaren Van Winkle kick (Drive: 3 plays, 77 yards, 0:54; MTST 21–10)
- (1:10) MTST – Ty McCullouch 39 yard pass from Tommy Mellott, Myles Sansted kick (Drive: 6 plays, 73 yards, 0:52; MTST 28–10)

Third quarter

- (11:05) MTST – Scottre Humphrey 36 yard run, Myles Sansted kick (Drive: 2 plays, 37 yards, 0:46; MTST 35–10)
- (6:50) MTST – Taco Dowler 29 yard pass from Tommy Mellott, Myles Sansted kick (Drive: 5 plays, 87 yards, 2:52; MTST 42–10)

Fourth quarter

- (11:27) MTST – Adam Jones 30 yard run, Myles Sansted kick (Drive: 8 plays, 68 yards, 4:26; MTST 49–10)
- (3:29) UTM – Trevonte Rucker 4 yard pass from Kinkead Dent, Jaren Van Winkle kick (Drive: 14 plays, 75 yards, 7:58; MTST 49–17)

Statistics	UTM	MTST
First downs	11	22
Total yards	264	501
Rushing yards	92	201
Passing yards	172	300
Passing: Comp–Att–Int	16–31–0	22–26–0
Time of possession	30:37	29:23

Team	Category	Player	Statistics
UT Martin	Passing	Kinkead Dent	15/29, 167 yds, 3 TD
UT Martin	Rushing	Patrick Smith	12 carries, 32 yards
UT Martin	Receiving	Trevonte Rucker	6 receptions, 107 yards, 2 TD
Montana State	Passing	Tommy Mellott	22/25, 300 yds, 4 TD
Montana State	Rushing	Scottre Humphrey	11 carries, 102 yards, 1 TD
Montana State	Receiving	Ryan Lonergan	3 receptions, 90 yards

== Rankings ==
Ranking movements Legend: ██ Increase in ranking ██ Decrease in ranking — = Not ranked т = Tied with team above or below
	Week														
Poll	Pre	1	2	3	4	5	6	7	8	9	10	11	12	13	Final
STATS	—	—	—	—	—	—	—	25т	—	—	19	18	22	23	17
Coaches	—	—	—	—	—	—	—	—	—	—	22	19	24	20	18

== Conference awards and honors ==
Skyhawk players received player of the week recognition four times during the season.

=== Weekly awards ===
Weekly honors
Honors	Player	Position	Date Awarded	Ref.
BS-OVC Special Teams Player of the Week	Jaren Van Winkle	K/P	September 16, 2024	
BS-OVC Co-Defensive Player of the Week	Oshae Baker	S	September 30, 2024	
BS-OVC Defensive Player of the Week	Jaylon Sharpe	LB	October 28, 2024	
BS-OVC Special Teams Player of the Week	Jaren Van Winkle	K/P	November 11, 2024	

=== Postseason All–Big South-OVC Teams ===
The Big South-OVC Conference announced the 2024 all-conference football team selections on November 26, 2024. UT Martin had a total of twelve players selected.

Offense

1st Team

- Patrick Smith – Running back, SR
- Vance Van Every, Offensive lineman, GR
- Drake Carroll, Offensive lineman, GR

2nd Team

- Charles Perkins, Defensive lineman, R-SO
- Christian Dowell, Defensive lineman, SR
- Jaylon Sharpe, Linebacker, GR
- Tevin Shipp, Linebacker, GR
- Oshae Baker, Defensive back, SR
- JaMichael McGoy Jr., Defensive back, R-JR

Defense

1st Team

- Trevonte Rucker, Wide receiver, SR
- Max Dowling, Tight end, R-SO
- Josiah Tingley, Offensive lineman, GR

2nd Team

- Chris Hunter Jr., Linebacker, GR

Special Teams

1st Team

- Oshae Baker, Punt returner, SR

2nd Team

- Colton Peoples, Long snapper, JR
