= 2025 Charleston Southern Buccaneers football team =

American college football season

2025 Charleston Southern Buccaneers football
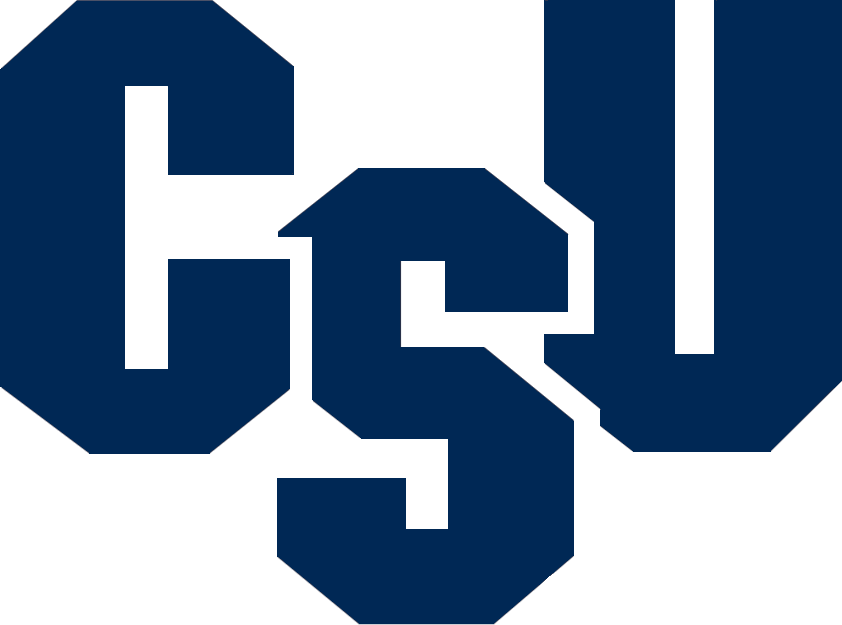
- Conference: OVC–Big South Football Association
- Record: 5–7 (4–4 OVC–Big South)
- Head coach: Gabe Giardina (3rd season)
- Offensive coordinator: Seth Strickland (1st season)
- Defensive coordinator: Nick Reveiz (3rd season)
- Home stadium: Buccaneer Field

2025 OVC–Big South football standings
	Conf.			Overall
Team	W		L	W		L
No. 16 Tennessee Tech $^	8	–	0	11	–	2
UT Martin	6	–	2	6	–	6
Gardner–Webb	5	–	3	7	–	5
Lindenwood	5	–	3	6	–	6
Charleston Southern	4	–	4	5	–	7
Southeast Missouri State	3	–	5	4	–	8
Western Illinois	3	–	5	4	–	8
Eastern Illinois	2	–	6	3	–	8
Tennessee State	0	–	8	2	–	10
$ – Conference champion; ^ – FCS playoff participant; Rankings from STATS Poll

The 2025 Charleston Southern Buccaneers football team represented Charleston Southern University as a member of the OVC–Big South Football Association during the 2025 NCAA Division I FCS football season. They were led by Gabe Giardina in his third season as head coach. The Buccaneers played their home games at Buccaneer Field in Charleston, South Carolina.

== Offseason ==
=== Preseason poll ===
The Big South-OVC Conference released their preseason poll on July 16, 2025. The Buccaneers were picked to finish last in the conference.

=== Transfers ===
==== Outgoing ====
Player	Position	Destination
Dylan Manuel	DL	Appalachian State
Laron Davis	LB	Bethune–Cookman
Noah Jennings	WR	Cincinnati
Davion Williams	S	Eastern Michigan
Fred Highsmith	WR	Fairmont State
Davin Driskell	TE	Fairmont State
Autavius Ison Jr.	RB	Mercer
Jaden Scott	WR	Presbyterian
Leon Thomas	DB	Tennessee Tech
Brandon Howard	S	UNC Pembroke
Arthur Lee Brown	DB	West Georgia
Tyler Glover	TE	West Georgia
Kaleb Jackson	QB	West Virginia State
Bryson Oliver	LB	Unknown
Edward Owusu	DL	Unknown
Gregory Bryant	DB	Unknown
Kaylon Walters	DB	Unknown
Jayden Wilson Abrams	DL	Unknown
Patrick Fisher- Butler	K/P	Unknown

==== Incoming ====
Player	Position	Height	Weight	Hometown	Previous school
Jason Hertz	DL	6-4	295	Indian Trail, NC	Appalachian State
Josiah Wyatt	DL	6-4	265	Buford, GA	Appalachian State
Avery Dixon	DB	6-1	195	Concord, VA	Bryant
Canii Tucker	DB	6-1	175	Ladson, SC	Chowan
Ke'Marion Baldwin	RB	5-9	200	St. Pauls, NC	James Madison
Nick Sawyer	DB	5-11	170	Harvest, AL	Kennesaw State
Loushon Campos	OL	6-5	311	Walterboro, SC	Limestone
Kiemond Emilien	DB	5-11	190	Spring, TX	Mississippi College
Charles Atkins	DL	6-3	245	Metairie, LA	Pearl River
Robert Clark	OL	6-1	315	Gluckstadt, MS	Pearl River
Lek Powell	QB	6-0	190	Carlisle, PA	Shepherd
Hugo Gil	DL	6-2	270	Manchester, NH	Temple
Tyler Smith	DB	6-0	175	Dallas, GA	Tuskegee
Malik McKenzie	DL	6-2	225	Sumter, SC	UNC Pembroke
Zach Gordon	K	6-0	190	Lillington, NC	Western New Mexico

=== Recruiting class ===
Name	Height	Weight	Position	Hometown	High School
Laden Beckwith	6-0	175	WR	Knightdale, NC	Willow Spring
Kevin Boone	6-1	185	WR	Moncks Corner, SC	Berkley
Jalen Brassell	5-10	175	DB	Douglasville, GA	Douglas County
Austin Brown	6-0	165	DB	Powder Springs, GA	McEachern
Ross Brown	6-3	217	DL	Anderson, SC	Westside
Anthony Carter	6-0	175	DB	Valdosta, GA	Lowndes
Caden Clay	6-2	200	QB	Valley, AL	Northside
Turner Davis	6-1	175	DB	Acworth, GA	North Cobb Christian Academy
Hunter Green	6-3	230	TE	Cumming, GA	West Forsyth
Shaun Hamilton	6-2	240	DL	Savannah, GA	New Hampstead
Jayden Hancock	6-0	165	DB	Douglas, GA	Coffee
Chancy Jordan	6-0	230	DL	Tallahassee, FL	Lincoln
Alvoid Kennon	6-0	173	DL	Bradenton, FL	Manatee
Tristan Lennon	6-0	192	LB	Zephyrhills, FL	Zephyrhills
Antwain Mitchell	6-3	250	OL	Hanahan, SC	Hanahan
Khavjae Nixon	6-4	260	OL	Lincolnton, NC	Lincolnton
Ramell Parker	6-3	275	OL	Bushnell, FL	South Sumter
Braylon Philips	6-0	185	LB	Bainbridge, GA	Bainbridge
Jamarian Pullum	6-0	184	DB	Adairsville, GA	Adairsville
Dylan Richardson	6-1	260	OL	Albany, GA	Lee County
Devontae Roberts	5-11	180	DB	Crawfordville, FL	Gadsden County
Harry Smalls	5-8	192	RB	Savannah, GA	Savannah Christian
Maddox Spencer	5-8	160	WR	Ponte Verde, FL	Nease
Hakeem Watters	5-7	168	RB	Hartsville, SC	Hartsville
Brandon McDonald	5-11	185	DB	Richmond Hill, GA	Richmond Hill
Hudson Morton	6-3	230	TE	Suwanee, GA	North Gwinnett
Sharode Richardson	5-10	185	RB	Anderson, SC	Westside
Isaac Smith	6-2	275	DL	Savannah, GA	Jenkins
Cleve Tellery II	6-0	290	DL	Columbia, SC	Ridge View

== Schedule ==
Date	Time	Opponent	Site	TV	Result	Attendance
August 30	7:00 p.m.	at Vanderbilt*	FirstBank Stadium; Nashville, TN	SECN+/ESPN+	L 3–45	35,000
September 6	7:30 p.m.	at Coastal Carolina*	Brooks Stadium; Conway, SC (rivalry)	ESPN+	L 0–13	22,217
September 13	4:00 p.m.	Lindenwood	Buccaneer Field; North Charleston, SC	ESPN+	L 28–35	3,831
September 20	4:00 p.m.	at William & Mary*	Zable Stadium; Williamsburg, VA	FloSports	L 7–34	8,527
September 27	6:00 p.m.	South Carolina State*	Buccaneer Field; North Charleston, SC	ESPN+	W 31–24	6,211
October 4	1:30 p.m.	at Gardner–Webb	Ernest W. Spangler Stadium; Boiling Springs, NC	ESPN+	L 27–30	3,618
October 11	4:00 p.m.	No. 10 Tennessee Tech	Buccaneer Field; North Charleston, SC	ESPN+	L 13–27	1,505
October 18	4:00 p.m.	at Western Illinois	Hanson Field; Macomb, IL	ESPN+	W 29–24	3,000
October 25	2:00 p.m.	Eastern Illinois^{†}	Buccaneer Field; North Charleston, SC	ESPN+	W 17–16	3,891
November 1	2:00 p.m.	at Southeast Missouri State	Houck Stadium; Cape Girardeau, MO	ESPN+	W 23–17	2,376
November 15	1:00 p.m.	at UT Martin	Graham Stadium; Martin, TN	ESPN+	L 14–17	3,006
November 22	2:00 p.m.	Tennessee State	Buccaneer Field; North Charleston, SC	ESPN+	W 7–6	3,678
*Non-conference game; ^{†}Homecoming; Rankings from STATS Poll released prior to the game; All times are in Eastern time

== Game summaries ==
=== at Vanderbilt (FBS) ===
Charleston Southern Buccaneers (0–0) at Vanderbilt Commodores (FBS) (0–0) – Game summary

Quarter	1	2	3	4	Total
Buccaneers	0	0	0	3	3
Commodores (FBS)	14	14	7	10	45

at FirstBank Stadium • Nashville, Tennessee

- Date: August 30
- Game time: 6:00 p.m. CDT
- Game weather: Sunny, 81 °F (27 °C)
- Game attendance: 35,000
- Referee: Jeff Heaser
- TV announcers (SECN+/ESPN+): Kevin Fitzgerald (play-by-play) and Charles Arbuckle (analyst)
- Box score, Recap

Game information

First quarter

- VAN – Kayleb Barnett 9-yard pass from Diego Pavia (Brock Taylor kick), 10:13. Commodores 7–0. Drive: 8 plays, 75 yards, 4:47.
- VAN – Junior Sherrill 12-yard pass from Diego Pavia (Brock Taylor kick), 6:59. Commodores 14–0. Drive: 4 plays, 53 yards, 1:32.

Second quarter

- VAN – A. J. Newberry 4-yard run (Brock Taylor kick), 10:19. Commodores 21–0. Drive: 14 plays, 89 yards, 7:45.
- VAN – Sedrick Alexander 26-yard pass from Diego Pavia (Brock Taylor kick), 3:11. Commodores 28–0. Drive: 5 plays, 64 yards, 1:51.

Third quarter

- VAN – Makhilyn Young 4-yard run (Brock Taylor kick), 5:47. Commodores 35–0. Drive: 4 plays, 21 yards, 2:27.

Fourth quarter

- VAN – Brock Taylor 35-yard field goal, 11:48. Commodores 38–0. Drive: 4 plays, 2 yards, 0:00.
- VAN – Jamezell Lassiter 35-yard run (Brock Taylor kick), 7:14. Commodores 45–0. Drive: 4 plays, 59 yards, 2:12.
- CHSO – Zach Gordon 38-yard field goal, 0:07. Commodores 45–3. Drive: 11 plays, 54 yards, 7:07.

Statistics	CHSO	VAN
First downs	7	25
Plays–yards	46–135	59–481
Rushes–yards	27–47	31–201
Passing yards	88	280
Passing: comp–att–int	10–19–1	21–28–0
Turnovers	2	0
Time of possession	27:51	32:09

Team	Category	Player	Statistics
Charleston Southern	Passing	Zolten Osborne	8/16, 54 yards, INT
Charleston Southern	Rushing	Isaiah Gordon	8 rushes, 28 yards
Charleston Southern	Receiving	Jamil Bishop	2 receptions, 36 yards
Vanderbilt	Passing	Diego Pavia	20/25, 275 yards, 3 TD
Vanderbilt	Rushing	Sedrick Alexander	12 rushes, 83 yards
Vanderbilt	Receiving	Eli Stowers	4 receptions, 86 yards

=== at Coastal Carolina (FBS) ===
Game Two – Charleston Southern Buccaneers (0–1) at Coastal Carolina Chanticleers (FBS) (0–1) – Game summary

Quarter	1	2	3	4	Total
Buccaneers	0	0	0	0	0
Chanticleers (FBS)	0	3	0	10	13

at Brooks Stadium • Conway, SC

- Date: Saturday September 6, 2025
- Game time: 7:30 p.m. EDT
- Game weather: Sunny
- Game attendance: 22,217
- Referee: Scott Broadway
- TV announcers (ESPN+): Sam Weiderhaft (play-by-play), Ricky Sapp (analyst) and Haley Nitsche (sideline)

Game information

First quarter

- No scoring plays.

Second quarter

- CCU – Kian Afrookhteh 21-yard field goal, 11:12. Chanticleers 3–0. Drive: 15 plays, 57 yards, 5:43.

Third quarter

- No scoring plays.

Fourth quarter

- CCU – Tad Hudson 4-yard run (Kian Afrookhteh kick), 10:02. Chanticleers 10–0. Drive: 16 plays, 83 yards, 7:03.
- CCU – Kian Afrookhteh 29-yard field goal, 1:11. Chanticleers 13–0. Drive: 15 plays, 75 yards, 6:30.

Statistics	CHSO	CCU
First downs	10	27
Plays–yards	48–153	78–388
Rushes–yards	26–98	51–249
Passing yards	55	139
Passing: Comp–Att–Int	10–22–1	16–27–3
Turnovers	1	3
Time of possession	24:25	35:35

Team	Category	Player	Statistics
Charleston Southern	Passing	Zolten Osborne	10/22, 55 yards, INT
Charleston Southern	Rushing	Ke'Marion Baldwin	8 carries, 62 yards
Charleston Southern	Receiving	Chris Rhone	5 receptions, 32 yards
Coastal Carolina	Passing	MJ Morris	13/22, 102 yards, 3 INT
Coastal Carolina	Rushing	Dominic Knicely	9 carries, 92 yards
Coastal Carolina	Receiving	Bryson Graves	5 receptions, 61 yards

=== vs. Lindenwood ===
Game Three – Lindenwood Lions (0–2) at Charleston Southern Buccaneers (0–2) – Game summary

Quarter	1	2	3	4	Total
Lions	0	0	0	0	0
Buccaneers	0	0	0	0	0

at Buccaneer Field • North Charleston, SC

- Date: Saturday September 13, 2025
- Game time: 4:00 p.m. EDT
- Game weather: Sunny 81 °F (27 °C)
- Game attendance: 3,831
- Referee: Chris Brison
- TV announcers (ESPN+): Justin Biegel (play-by-play) and Ford Werness (analyst)

Game information

First quarter
Second quarter
Third quarter
Fourth quarter

Statistics	LIN	CHSO
First downs		
Total yards		
Rushing yards		
Passing yards		
Passing: Comp–Att–Int		
Time of possession		

Team	Category	Player	Statistics
Lindenwood	Passing		
Lindenwood	Rushing		
Lindenwood	Receiving		
Charleston Southern	Passing		
Charleston Southern	Rushing		
Charleston Southern	Receiving		

=== at William & Mary ===
Game Four – Charleston Southern Buccaneers (0–3) at William & Mary Tribe (1–2) – Game summary

Quarter	1	2	3	4	Total
Buccaneers	0	7	0	0	7
Tribe	7	7	13	7	34

at Zable Stadium • Williamsburg, VA

- Date: Saturday September 20, 2025
- Game time: 4:00 p.m. EDT
- Game weather: Cloudy 81 °F (27 °C)
- Game attendance: 8,527
- Referee: Tom Zetts
- TV announcers (FloSports): Jay Colley (play-by-play) and Sean McDermott (analyst)

Game information

First quarter
Second quarter
Third quarter
Fourth quarter

Statistics	CHSO	W&M
First downs		
Total yards		
Rushing yards		
Passing yards		
Passing: Comp–Att–Int		
Time of possession		

Team	Category	Player	Statistics
Charleston Southern	Passing		
Charleston Southern	Rushing		
Charleston Southern	Receiving		
William & Mary	Passing		
William & Mary	Rushing		
William & Mary	Receiving		

=== vs. South Carolina State ===
Game Five – South Carolina State Bulldogs (2–2) at Charleston Southern Buccaneers (0–4) – Game summary

Quarter	1	2	3	4	Total
Bulldogs	0	14	7	3	24
Buccaneers	14	7	0	10	31

at Buccaneer Field • North Charleston, SC

- Date: Saturday September 27, 2025
- Game time: 6:00 p.m. EDT
- Game weather: Sunny
- Game attendance: 6,211
- Referee: Michael Causey
- TV announcers (ESPN+): Justin Biegel (play-by-play), Jack Delongchamps (analyst) and Ford Werness (sideline)

Game information
First quarter
- CHSO – Quay Kindell 38-yard pass from Zolten Osborne (Zach Gordon kick), 11:26. Buccaneers 7–0. Drive: 4 plays, 71 yards, 1:59.
- CHSO – Ke'Marion Baldwin 26-yard run (Zach Gordon kick), 6:26. Buccaneers 14–0. Drive: 6 plays, 79 yards, 3:06.

Second quarter

- SCST – Ryan Stubblefield 3-yard run (Nico Cavanillas Alti kick), 12:58. Buccaneers 14–7. Drive: 10 plays, 85 yards, 4:23.
- SCST – Ryan Stubblefield 4-yard run (Nico Cavanillas Alti kick), 4:56. Tied 14–14. Drive: 11 plays, 71 yards, 5:06.
- CHSO – Champ Bentley 0-yard fumble return (Zach Gordon kick), 1:06. Buccaneers 21–14.

Third quarter

- SCST – Tyler Smith 19-yard run (Nico Cavanillas Alti kick), 6:53. Tied 21–21. Drive: 6 plays, 80 yards, 2:16.

Fourth quarter

- CHSO – Zach Gordon 37-yard field goal, 8:40. Buccaneers 24–21. Drive: 13 plays, 61 yards, 5:35.
- SCST – Nico Cavanillas Alti 50-yard field goal, 3:56. Tied 24–24. Drive: 10 plays, 35 yards, 4:34.
- CHSO – Ke'Marion Baldwin 10-yard run (Zach Gordon kick), 1:03. Buccaneers 31–24. Drive: 6 plays, 65 yards, 2:53.

Statistics	SCST	CHSO
First downs	25	18
Total yards	449	345
Rushing yards	255	147
Passing yards	194	198
Passing: Comp–Att–Int	18–26–0	13–28–1
Time of possession	33:47	26:13

Team	Category	Player	Statistics
South Carolina State	Passing	Ryan Stubblefield	18/24, 194 yards
South Carolina State	Rushing	Tyler Smith	13 carries, 85 yards, TD
South Carolina State	Receiving	Jalen Johnson	8 receptions, 77 yards
Charleston Southern	Passing	Zolten Osbourne	13/28, 198 yards, TD, INT
Charleston Southern	Rushing	Ke'Marion Baldwin	18 carries, 122 yards, 2 TD
Charleston Southern	Receiving	Chris Rhone	5 receptions, 106 yards

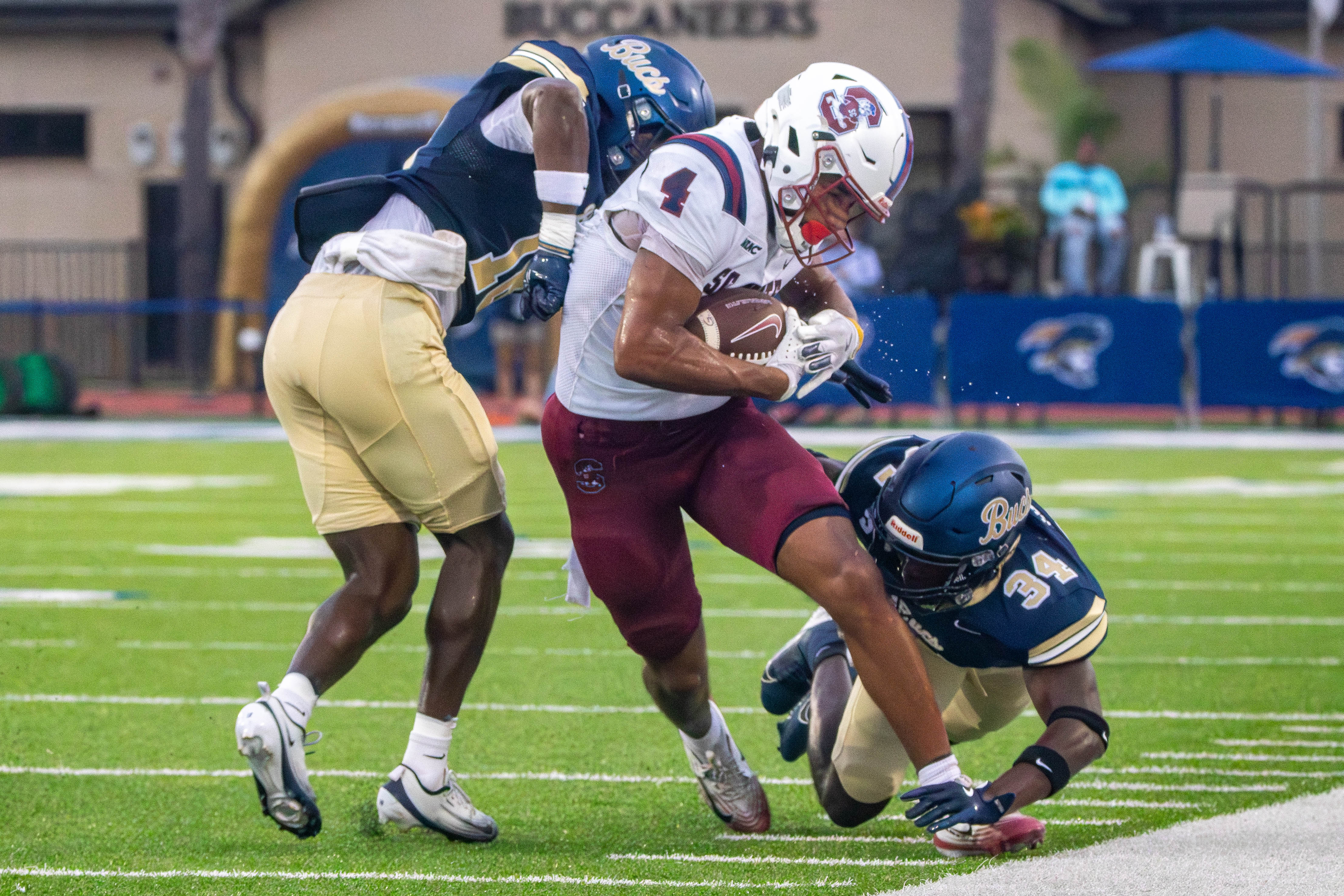
SCSU vs CSU 2025

=== at Gardner–Webb ===
Game Six – Charleston Southern Buccaneers (1–4) at Gardner–Webb Runnin' Bulldogs (2–2) – Game summary

Quarter	1	2	3	4	Total
Buccaneers	0	7	0	20	27
Runnin' Bulldogs	3	7	0	20	30

at Ernest W. Spangler Stadium • Boiling Springs, NC

- Date: Saturday October 4, 2025
- Game time: 1:30 p.m. EDT
- Game weather: Sunny 73 °F (23 °C)
- Game attendance: 3,618
- Referee: Jeremee Tate
- TV announcers (ESPN+): Ford Martin (play-by-play) and Bryson Byrnes (analyst)

Game information

First quarter
Second quarter
Third quarter
Fourth quarter

Statistics	CHSO	GWEB
First downs		
Total yards		
Rushing yards		
Passing yards		
Passing: Comp–Att–Int		
Time of possession		

Team	Category	Player	Statistics
Charleston Southern	Passing		
Charleston Southern	Rushing		
Charleston Southern	Receiving		
Gardner–Webb	Passing		
Gardner–Webb	Rushing		
Gardner–Webb	Receiving		

=== vs. No. 10 Tennessee Tech ===
Game Seven – No. 10 Tennessee Tech Golden Eagles (5–0) at Charleston Southern Buccaneers (1–5) – Game summary

Quarter	1	2	3	4	Total
No. 10 Golden Eagles	7	13	7	0	27
Buccaneers	3	7	0	3	13

at Buccaneer Field • North Charleston, SC

- Date: Saturday October 11, 2025
- Game time: 4:00 p.m. EDT
- Game weather: Rain 68 °F (20 °C)
- Game attendance: 1,505
- Referee: Brandon McCain
- TV announcers (ESPN+): Justin Biegel (play-by-play) and Ford Werness (analyst)

Game information

First quarter
Second quarter
Third quarter
Fourth quarter

Statistics	TNTC	CHSO
First downs		
Total yards		
Rushing yards		
Passing yards		
Passing: Comp–Att–Int		
Time of possession		

Team	Category	Player	Statistics
Tennessee Tech	Passing		
Tennessee Tech	Rushing		
Tennessee Tech	Receiving		
Charleston Southern	Passing		
Charleston Southern	Rushing		
Charleston Southern	Receiving		

=== at Western Illinois ===
Game Eight – Charleston Southern Buccaneers (1–6) at Western Illinois Leathernecks (1–6) – Game summary

Quarter	1	2	3	4	Total
Buccaneers	7	7	7	8	29
Leathernecks	10	7	7	0	24

at Hanson Field • Macomb, IL

- Date: Saturday October 18, 2025
- Game time: 4:00 p.m. EDT
- Game weather: Sunny
- Game attendance: 3,000
- Referee: Drew Myers
- TV announcers (ESPN+): Russ Eisenstein (play-by-play), Aiden Dersien (analyst) and Caiden Strenz (sideline)

Game information

First quarter
Second quarter
Third quarter
Fourth quarter

Statistics	CHSO	WIU
First downs		
Total yards		
Rushing yards		
Passing yards		
Passing: Comp–Att–Int		
Time of possession		

Team	Category	Player	Statistics
Charleston Southern	Passing		
Charleston Southern	Rushing		
Charleston Southern	Receiving		
Western Illinois	Passing		
Western Illinois	Rushing		
Western Illinois	Receiving		

=== vs. Eastern Illinois ===
Game Nine – Eastern Illinois Panthers (3–4) at Charleston Southern Buccaneers (2–6) – Game summary

Quarter	1	2	3	4	Total
Panthers	0	6	7	3	16
Buccaneers	0	3	0	14	17

at Buccaneer Field • North Charleston, SC

- Date: Saturday October 25, 2025
- Game time: 2:00 p.m. EDT
- Game weather: Sunny
- Game attendance: 3,891
- Referee: Gabriel Tomlin
- TV announcers (ESPN+): Justin Biegel (play-by-play) and Ford Werness (analyst)

Game information

First quarter
Second quarter
Third quarter
Fourth quarter

Statistics	EIU	CHSO
First downs		
Total yards		
Rushing yards		
Passing yards		
Passing: Comp–Att–Int		
Time of possession		

Team	Category	Player	Statistics
Eastern Illinois	Passing		
Eastern Illinois	Rushing		
Eastern Illinois	Receiving		
Charleston Southern	Passing		
Charleston Southern	Rushing		
Charleston Southern	Receiving		

=== at Southeast Missouri State ===
Game Ten – Charleston Southern Buccaneers (3–6) at Southeast Missouri State Redhawks (3–5) – Game summary

Quarter	1	2	3	4	Total
Buccaneers	0	0	0	0	0
Redhawks	0	0	0	0	0

at Houck Stadium • Cape Girardeau, MO

- Date: Saturday November 1, 2025
- Game time: 2:00 p.m. EDT
- TV announcers (ESPN+): Erik Sean (play-by-play) and Rick Wieser (analyst)

Game information

First quarter
Second quarter
Third quarter
Fourth quarter

Statistics	CHSO	SEMO
First downs		
Total yards		
Rushing yards		
Passing yards		
Passing: Comp–Att–Int		
Time of possession		

Team	Category	Player	Statistics
Charleston Southern	Passing		
Charleston Southern	Rushing		
Charleston Southern	Receiving		
Southeast Missouri State	Passing		
Southeast Missouri State	Rushing		
Southeast Missouri State	Receiving		

=== at UT Martin ===
Game Eleven – Charleston Southern Buccaneers (4–6) at UT Martin Skyhawks (0–0) – Game summary

Quarter	1	2	3	4	Total
Buccaneers	0	0	0	0	0
Skyhawks	0	0	0	0	0

at Graham Stadium • Martin, TN

- Date: Saturday November 15, 2025
- Game time: TBA
- TV announcers (ESPN+): TBA

Game information

First quarter
Second quarter
Third quarter
Fourth quarter

Statistics	CHSO	UTM
First downs		
Total yards		
Rushing yards		
Passing yards		
Passing: Comp–Att–Int		
Time of possession		

Team	Category	Player	Statistics
Charleston Southern	Passing		
Charleston Southern	Rushing		
Charleston Southern	Receiving		
UT Martin	Passing		
UT Martin	Rushing		
UT Martin	Receiving		

=== vs. Tennessee State ===
Game Twelve – Tennessee State Tigers (0–0) at Charleston Southern Buccaneers (0–0) – Game summary

Quarter	1	2	3	4	Total
Tigers	0	0	0	0	0
Buccaneers	0	0	0	0	0

at Buccaneer Field • North Charleston, SC

- Date: Saturday November 22, 2025
- Game time: TBA
- TV announcers (ESPN+): TBA

Game information

First quarter
Second quarter
Third quarter
Fourth quarter

Statistics	TNST	CHSO
First downs		
Total yards		
Rushing yards		
Passing yards		
Passing: Comp–Att–Int		
Time of possession		

Team	Category	Player	Statistics
Tennessee State	Passing		
Tennessee State	Rushing		
Tennessee State	Receiving		
Charleston Southern	Passing		
Charleston Southern	Rushing		
Charleston Southern	Receiving		

== Personnel ==
=== Roster ===
2025 Charleston Southern Buccaneers football team roster
Players
Coaches
Offense

Pos.	#	Name	Class
WR	0	Jamil Bishop	Sr
RB	2	Isaiah Gordon	Jr
WR	3	Chris Rhone	Sr
RB	4	Ke'Marion Baldwin	So
QB	5	Zolten Osborne	Jr
QB	6	Lek Powell	Sr
QB	7	Jared Echols	So
WR	8	Quay Kindell	Jr
QB	10	Braxton Scott	So
TE	12	Landon Sauers	Sr
WR	14	Rashawn Cunningham	So
WR	16	Mekhi Campfield	Jr
WR	22	Elijah Gillespie	Fr
RB	22	Brandon Musch	So
RB	23	Tyson Greenwade	So
RB	32	Korey Williams	Jr
OL	50	Christian Echols	So
OL	51	Ronnie Hayes II	Sr
OL	53	Omar Holland	GS
OL	58	Ramell Parker	Fr
OL	60	Eli Simonds	So
OL	62	Ethan Hunt	Sr
OL	63	Kaden Strickland	Sr
OL	68	Robert Clark	Jr
OL	69	Chamber Eldridge	So
OL	70	Colin Sorensen	So
OL	71	Josiah Lancaster	Jr
OL	73	Antwain Mitchell	Fr
OL	75	Justin Joe	So
OL	76	Andrew Threatt	Jr
OL	78	Parker McClendon	So
WR	81	Laden Beckwith	Fr
TE	85	Hasan Lee Jr	So
WR	86	Weldon Gunter	So
WR	88	Maddox Spencer	Fr
WR	89	Ryan Lawson	So
RB		Jayden Rattigan	Jr

Defense

Pos.	#	Name	Class
LB	2	Justin Waters	Sr
DL	3	Malik McKenzie	Sr
LB	5	Steve Zayachkowsky	Jr
DB	6	Avery Dixon	Jr
LB	7	Nick Bartalo	Sr
DL	8	Hugo Gil	So
DB	9	Anthony Carter	So
S	11	Dominic Pagano	Sr
S	13	Chandler Perry	Jr
DB	15	Tyler Smith	Jr
DB	18	Kaylon Walters	Sr
DB	19	Anthony Paulk	So
DL	20	David Portu	Jr
DB	24	Kiemond Emilien	So
S	25	Champ Brantley	Jr
S	26	Knai Cook	So
LB	28	Tylan Hollis	Sr
DB	29	Canii Tucker	Sr
DB	30	Jayden Hancock	Fr
DB	34	Kason Hooks	So
S	37	Shamar Hall	So
S	40	Taivon Snipe	Jr
S	42	Evan Wynn	Jr
LB	43	Aiden Krupa	Jr
DL	44	Mylan Bowen	So
S	48	Brayden Woolbright	So
DL	52	Josias Addison	Sr
LB	54	Chris Woods Jr.	So
LB	55	Angel Miles	So
LB	57	Gregory Wardlaw	So
DL	72	Nasir Bailey	So
DL	77	Travis Rice	Sr
S	82	Adam Bass	So
DL	91	CJ Landrum	So
DL	95	Charles Atkins	Jr
DL	96	Jayden Wilson-Abrams	So
DL	97	Juliuz Walton	Jr
DL	99	Dylan Manuel	So

Special teams

Pos.	#	Name	Class
P	1	Gilbert Brown	Sr
K	45	Zach Gordon	Jr
K/P	46	Christian Wilson	So
LS	47	Noah Summers	Jr
K/P	49	Reid Montgomery	So
LS	61	Ross Rambo	So
K/P	87	Patrick Fisher-Butler	Jr
K/P	98	Will Laing	Jr

Head coach

- Gabe Giardina

Coordinators/assistant coaches

- Nick Reveiz – Defensive coordinator
- Adam Hollifield – Offensive coordinator/Offensive line
- Shuler Bentley – Quarterbacks
- Tyler Bell – Running backs
- Zack Johnson – Linebackers
- Vince Giardina – Wide receivers/Recruiting coordinator
- Mike Welch – Defensive line
- Maurice Duncan – Secondary
- Jalen Bush – Graduate assistant/Corners
- Braxton Chadwick – Graduate assistant/Secondary
- Trevor Arrington – Graduate assistant/Offensive line
- Randy Fillingame – Graduate assistant/Video coordinator
- Cade Rowland – Graduate assistant/Wide receivers

Legend

- (C) Team captain
- (S) Suspended
- (I) Ineligible
- Injured
- Redshirt

Roster
Last update: 2/15/25
