= Gabe Giardina =

American football coach and player

Current position
- Title: Head coach
- Team: Charleston Southern
- Conference: OVC–Big South
- Record: 10–26

Playing career
- 2000–2003: Alabama
- Positions: Placekicker, holder

Coaching career (HC unless noted)
- 2004: Alabama (SA)
- 2005–2007: Alabama (GA)
- 2008–2011: Charleston Southern (ST/RB)
- 2012: Delta State (OC/WR)
- 2013–2016: Charleston Southern (OC)
- 2017–2022: Albany State
- 2023–present: Charleston Southern

Head coaching record
- Overall: 47–43
- Tournaments: 0–1 (NCAA D-II playoffs)

Accomplishments and honors

Championships
- 1 SIAC (2021); 3 SIAC East Division (2018–2019, 2021)

Gabe Giardina is an American football coach and former player who is currently the head coach for the Charleston Southern Buccaneers. He played college football at Alabama and had previously coached there, at Delta State and at Albany State.

== Early life and education ==
Giardina attended State College Area High School in Pennsylvania for a year, then Penns Valley Area High School for two years, before spending one year at DuPont High School in West Virginia and one at The Kiski School. He enrolled at the University of Alabama in 2000 and was a walk-on member of their football team, playing placekicker and holder. He was named Academic All-Southeastern Conference (SEC) as a senior in 2003 and appeared in nine games. ESPN commentator Chris Fowler described Giardina as "Alabama's answer to Rudy."

== Coaching career ==
Giardina began a coaching career in 2004 after graduating from Alabama, working as a student coach for free. He was promoted to graduate assistant in 2005. He served through 2007 in that position under coaches Mike Shula and Nick Saban. Giardina began serving as running backs coach and special teams coach at Charleston Southern in 2008, where he served through 2011.

In 2012, Giardina served as offensive coordinator and wide receivers coach at Delta State. The following year, he returned to Charleston Southern as offensive coordinator. In four seasons, Giardina helped the school win 36 games, one conference championship and reach the playoffs twice.

Giardina was named the head coach at Albany State, an NCAA Division II program, in 2017. In his first season as head coach, he led them to a 6–4 record, including a win in the Fountain City Classic. They improved to 7–4 in 2018, including a perfect 6–0 conference record, before eventually losing the SIAC championship to Miles. Albany State again went 7–4 in Giardina's third year, before again going down to Miles in the championship. After not playing in 2020, Albany State won ten games in 2021, including the conference championship, reaching the playoffs where they lost to West Georgia.

After a 7–3 record in 2022, Giardina left Albany State to be named head coach at Charleston Southern. He finished his five-season stint at Albany State with an overall record of 37–17.

== Personal life ==
Giardina is a Christian, and said upon being named Charleston Southern head coach, "It's got to be more than just a football foundation. Here at Charleston Southern, we get to put in a spiritual foundation unashamedly. Here, we're going to have The Lord out front of this thing. We're going to immerse this thing in prayer. That's the most important thing, to see where God is going to take this."

== Head coaching record ==
Year	Team	Overall	Conference	Standing	Bowl/playoffs	AFCA^{#}
Albany State Golden Rams (Southern Intercollegiate Athletic Conference) (2017–2022)
2017	Albany State	6–4	4–2	3rd (East)		
2018	Albany State	7–4	6–0	1st (East)		
2019	Albany State	7–4	5–1	2nd (East)		
2020–21	No team—COVID-19					
2021	Albany State	10–2	6–0	1st (East)	L NCAA Division II First Round	18
2022	Albany State	7–3	5–2	T–2nd (East)		
Albany State:		37–17	26–5			
Charleston Southern Buccaneers (Big South–OVC Football Association) (2023–present)
2023	Charleston Southern	4–7	2–4	T–6th		
2024	Charleston Southern	1–11	0–8	9th		
2025	Charleston Southern	5–7	4–4	5th		
2026	Charleston Southern	0–1	0–1			
Charleston Southern:		10–26	6–16			
Total:		47–43				
National championship Conference title Conference division title or championship game berth
