= Autry Denson =

American gridiron football player and coach (born 1976)

Personal information
- Born: December 8, 1976 (age 49); Lauderhill, Florida, U.S.
- Listed height: 5 ft 10 in (1.78 m)
- Listed weight: 203 lb (92 kg)

Career information
- Position: Running back (No. 21, 25, 20)
- High school: Nova (Davie, Florida)
- College: Notre Dame
- NFL draft: 1999: 7th round, 233rd overall pick

Career history

Playing
- Tampa Bay Buccaneers (1999)*; Miami Dolphins (1999–2000); Chicago Bears (2001); Indianapolis Colts (2002); Detroit Lions (2002); Rhein Fire (2003); Montreal Alouettes (2004)
- * Offseason or practice squad member only

Coaching
- Pope John Paul II HS (FL) (2010) Head coach; Bethune–Cookman (2011–2013) Running backs coach; Miami (OH) (2014) Running backs coach; Notre Dame (2015–2018) Running backs coach; Charleston Southern (2019–2022) Head coach; Arizona Cardinals (2023–2025) Running backs coach

Awards and highlights
- Second-team All-American (1998)

Career NFL statistics
- Rushing yards: 212
- Rushing average: 3.4
- Rushing TDs: 0
- Receiving yards: 133
- Receiving average: 7.4
- Receiving TDs: 0
- Stats at Pro Football Reference

Head coaching record
- Career: NCAA: 14–22 (.389)

Autry Lamont Denson (born December 8, 1976) is an American professional football coach and former player who most recently served as the running backs coach for the Arizona Cardinals of the National Football League (NFL) from 2023 to 2025. He previously served as the head coach at Charleston Southern University from 2019 to 2022.

Denson played college football as running back at the University of Notre Dame. He played professionally for four seasons in the NFL with the Miami Dolphins, Indianapolis Colts, and Chicago Bears and one season in the Canadian Football League (CFL) with the Montreal Alouettes.

== Playing career ==
=== High school ===
Denson attended Nova High School where he played for Willie Dodaro.

=== College ===
Denson is Notre Dame's all-time leading rusher with 4,318 yards and 43 touchdowns while holding many other rushing records at the University of Notre Dame.

In 1997, he ran for 1,268 yards on 264 carries and scored 12 TDs. In 1998, he ran for 1,306 yards on 277 carries and scored 18 TDs.

Denson was the MVP of the Gator Bowl in 1999 played against Georgia Tech.

=== Professional ===
Denson was selected in the seventh round with the 233rd pick of the 1999 NFL draft by Tampa Bay Buccaneers. He never made it to the active roster for Tampa Bay.

In two years (1999–2000) with Miami Dolphins, he ran for 206 yards on 59 carries while also catching 18 passes for 133 yards. In 2000, he returned 20 kicks for 495 yards. Denson spent the 2001 season with the Chicago Bears. He had only one carry for 4 yards while spending most of the year on special teams. While on special teams he returned 23 kicks for 534 yards as well as 1 punt return for 5 yards. During the 2002 with the Indianapolis Colts, Denson rushed for 2 yards on 2 carries with 2 kick returns for 38 yards.

Denson spent the 2004 season in the Canadian Football League (CL) as a member of the Montreal Alouettes. He finished eighth in rushing with 772 yards and nine touchdowns while being given the player of the week Honors during the season.

== Coaching career ==
=== Early career ===
In April 2010, after spending some years away from the game of football, Denson was named the head football coach at Pope John Paul II High School in Boca Raton, Florida.

=== Bethune–Cookman ===
In 2011, Denson was hired as the running backs coach at Bethune–Cookman University.

=== Miami (OH) ===
In 2014, Denson joined Miami University as their running backs coach.

=== Notre Dame ===
In 2015, Denson was hired to fill the running backs coaching vacancy at the University of Notre Dame, his alma mater. , and the University of South Florida.

=== Charleston Southern ===
Denson was named the head coach at Charleston Southern on January 14, 2019. He was relieved of his duties following the 2022 season, after a 2–8 finish.

=== Arizona Cardinals ===
On March 1, 2023, the Arizona Cardinals hired Denson as their running backs coach.

== Head coaching record ==
Year	Team	Overall	Conference	Standing	Bowl/playoffs
Charleston Southern Buccaneers (Big South Conference) (2019–2022)
2019	Charleston Southern	6–6	4–2	3rd	
2020–21	Charleston Southern	2–2	2–2	3rd	
2021	Charleston Southern	4–6	3–4	T–3rd	
2022	Charleston Southern	2–8	2–3	T–3rd	
Charleston Southern:		14–22	11–11		
Total:		14–22			
