= Charleston Southern Buccaneers football =

College football team of Charleston Southern University

2026 Charleston Southern Buccaneers football team
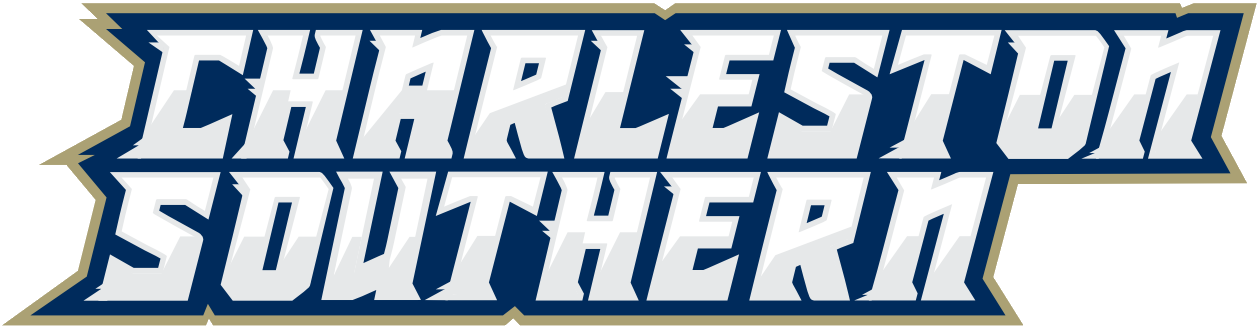
- First season: 1991; 35 years ago
- Athletic director: Jeff Barber
- Head coach: Gabe Giardina; 4th season, 10–25 (.286)
- Location: Charleston, South Carolina
- Stadium: Buccaneer Field (capacity: 4,000)
- NCAA division: Division I FCS
- Conference: Ohio Valley
- Colors: Blue and gold
- All-time record: 151–228 (.398)

Conference championships
- Big South: 2005, 2015, 2016
- Rivalries: Coastal Carolina; The Citadel
- Mascot: Bucky the Buccaneer
- Website: csusports.com

The Charleston Southern Buccaneers football program is the intercollegiate American football team for Charleston Southern University located in the U.S. state of South Carolina. The team competes in the NCAA Division I Football Championship Subdivision (FCS) and are an affiliate member of the Ohio Valley Conference for football. Charleston Southern's first football team was fielded in 1991. The team plays its home games at the 4,000 seat Buccaneer Field in North Charleston, South Carolina and are currently coached by Gabe Giardina.

== History ==
The Charleston Southern football program was established in 1985 as the Baptist College at Charleston club football team under the direction of coach Chuck Welty, prior to the school changing its name to Charleston Southern University in 1990, and the football program's transition to NCAA Division III status in 1991, which is a non-scholarship division. After NCAA rule changes required all sports to be in the same division, the Buccaneers moved from Division III to Division I in 1993, as the other campus programs were Division I. This caused some challenges for the new program, as they faced off with more established and better funded programs. In 1996, the Bucs went 1–10 with a lone win versus West Virginia State. Wins were scarce, and in 1997, head coach David Dowd hired defensive coordinator Todd Knight from Gardner-Webb University. The two coaches oversaw a slow improvement that began with a large recruiting class in 1997 with 34 scholarships being offered. That team would struggle to a 1–9 record with a lone win over Tusculum College. The opening game was a 30–7 loss to top 10 ranked East Tennessee State, followed by a heart-breaking loss at then No. 22 ranked South Carolina State. In that game, the Buccaneers led 12–6 with less than 1:30 to play, with SC State driving inside the 40 yard line. On fourth and short, CSU hit the SC State QB to cause a fumble which the Bucs recovered and began to run with, only to then fumble the ball back, and SC State would score the game winning touchdown on the ensuing drive. The 1997 team struggled to recover from that loss. A tragic loss off the field was part of that season, as freshman running back Kevin Keyes was murdered near his hometown of Goose Creek, SC.

The 2000 Buccaneers team beat Liberty for the first time 25–0 and lost to Samford in overtime to finish the season at 5–6.

=== Jay Mills era (2003–2012) ===
Jay Mills came to Charleston Southern from Harvard University. He had previously spent time coaching at several other places, including Boise State, Notre Dame, and Minnesota-Morris. His system shifted from CSU's traditional power based, pro-style offense to a spread offense. Several starters were dismissed from the team for various situations, and most of the coaching staff was changed. His first season considered a disaster, as the Bucs stumbled to a 1–11 record, with a lone win over West Virginia State. The season included blowout losses to The Citadel, Gardner Webb, VMI, James Madison, and Coastal Carolina. However, Coach Mills used the 2003 season to break-in a freshman quarterback named Colin Drafts. While this was a difficult season of transition, it provided the groundwork for a remarkable turnaround, and the emergence of one of the most prolific offensive players in CSU and Big South Conference history. In 2004, CSU saw a game against The Citadel canceled due to a looming hurricane. The Bucs were able to post a 5–5 record, the first non-losing season in CSU history. Quarterback Colin Drafts began to emerge as a star player as did running back Travis Mays and linebacker Joshua Mitchell. Wideout Eddie Gadson would also progress from walk-on to All Big South Conference in one season.

=== Jamey Chadwell era (2013–2016) ===
Jamey Chadwell became head coach after the retirement of Jay Mills following the 2012 season. The program reached new heights with the most wins in a season (10) in 2013, a win over national FCS power Appalachian State, back-to-back conference championships in 2015 and 2016, four straight wins over The Citadel, and two home wins over Coastal Carolina. In 2016, the Buccaneers took five-time reigning FCS champion North Dakota State into overtime, but eventually succumbed in a tough 24–17 loss. While the loss was hard on the team, it showed the progress and maturity of a once-small football program. In 2017, Jamey Chadwell accepted a position at Coastal Carolina which resulted in Mark Tucker taking over the head coaching position. CSU had been consistently ranked in the FCS top 25 under Chadwell's tenure.

=== Mark Tucker era (2017–2018) ===
Former quarterbacks coach Mark Tucker took over the football program in January 2017 after the departure of head coach Jamey Chadwell. Following several coaching changes and a strong recruiting class, Tucker hoped to have continued success with the Buccaneers. CSU followed up the 2016 campaign with a 6–5 record in 2017. Following a 5–6 season in 2018, Mark Tucker resigned as the head coach on December 7, 2018. He compiled an 11–11 overall record.

=== Autry Denson era (2019–2022) ===
Notre Dame running backs coach Autry Denson was named head coach in January 2019. He was relieved of his duties following the 2022 season, after a 2–8 finish.

=== Gabe Giardina era (2023–present) ===
After finishing a five-season stint at Albany State with an overall record of 37–17, Gabe Giardina was named Charleston Southern's sixth head football coach in program history in November 2022. In his first year, he led the Buccaneers to a 4–7 record.

== Conferences ==
=== Classifications ===
- 1991–1992: NCAA Division III
- 1992–present: NCAA Division I-AA/FCS

== Notable former players ==
- Charles James
- Maurice Price
- Chuck Grier

== Championships ==
=== Conference championships ===
Year	Coach	Conference	Overall record	Conference record
2005†	Jay Mills	Big South Conference	7–4	3–1
2015	Jamey Chadwell	Big South Conference	10–3	6–0
2016†	Jamey Chadwell	Big South Conference	7–4	4–1
Conference Championships			3	

† Co-champions

== NCAA Division I-AA/FCS playoffs results ==
The Buccaneers have appeared in the NCAA Division I Football Championship playoffs two times. Their record is 1–2.

Year	Round	Opponent	Result
2015	Second Round; Quarterfinals	The Citadel; Jacksonville State	W, 14–6; L, 38–58
2016	First Round	Wofford	L, 14–15

== Rivalries ==
=== The Citadel ===
These two schools first met on the football field in 2002 and became a rivalry under former head coach, Jamey Chadwell. The Buccaneers won four in a row under Chadwell including two wins in 2015, as CSU took down The Citadel in the NCAA Division I Second Round Playoffs at Buccaneer Field. Under head coaches Mark Tucker and Autry Denson, the Bucs won once and lost twice to the Bulldogs.

Citadel leads the series 8–6.

- 2024 – Citadel @ CSU – L, 21–22
- 2021 – CSU @ Citadel - W, 38–21
- 2019 – CSU @ Citadel - L, 13–22
- 2018 – CSU @ Citadel - L, 14–43
- 2015 – Citadel @ CSU – W, 14–6 (NCAA Division I FCS Playoffs [Second Round])
- 2015 – CSU @ Citadel – W, 33–20
- 2014 – Citadel @ CSU – W, 20–18
- 2013 – CSU @ Citadel – W, 32–29
- 2012 – CSU @ Citadel – L, 14–49
- 2007 – CSU @ Citadel – L, 14–35
- 2006 – CSU @ Citadel – W, 38–35
- 2005 – CSU @ Citadel – L, 14–28
- 2003 – CSU @ Citadel – L, 10–64
- 2002 – CSU @ Citadel – L, 19–53 (First Meeting)

=== Coastal Carolina ===
These two schools first met on the football field in 2003 and it has been a rivalry since Charleston Southern defeated Coastal Carolina 34–27 in 2005 to win a share of the Big South Championship that Coastal had already clinched. CSU got the first shutout of the series with their 24–0 win in 2008. In 2015, Coastal Carolina, then ranked No. 1 nationally, were defeated by the No. 19 ranked Buccaneers 33–25, giving Charleston Southern the sole lead in the Big South Conference.

Coastal Carolina leads the series 9–6.

- 2025 – CSU @ Coastal – L, 0–13
- 2016 – CSU @ Coastal – W, 59–58 ^{2OT}
- 2015 – Coastal @ CSU – W, 33–25
- 2014 – CSU @ Coastal – L, 22–43
- 2013 – Coastal @ CSU – W, 31–26
- 2012 – CSU @ Coastal – L, 20–41
- 2011 – Coastal @ CSU – L, 38–45
- 2010 – CSU @ Coastal – L, 3–70
- 2009 – Coastal @ CSU – W, 30–23
- 2008 – CSU @ Coastal – W, 24–0
- 2007 – Coastal @ CSU – L, 2–41
- 2006 – CSU @ Coastal – L, 17–31
- 2005 – Coastal @ CSU – W, 34–27 ^{2OT}
- 2004 – CSU @ Coastal – L, 28–56
- 2003 – Coastal @ CSU – L, 14–48 (First Meeting)

== Charleston Southern vs In-State NCAA Division I schools ==
School	Record	Percentage	Streak	First Meeting	Last Meeting
Clemson Tigers	0–1	.000	Lost 1	2023	2023
Coastal Carolina Chanticleers	6–9	.400	Won 2	2003	2025
Furman Paladins	1–2	.333	Won 1	2019	2024
Presbyterian Blue Hose	13–14	.481	Won 5	1993	2019
South Carolina Gamecocks	0–1	.000	Lost 1	2019	2019
South Carolina State Bulldogs	0–7	.000	Lost 7	1991	1999
The Citadel Bulldogs	6–8	.429	Lost 1	2002	2024
Wofford Terriers	0–14	.000	Lost 14	1993	2016
Charleston Southern 26 – In-State NCAA Division I Schools 56

== Charleston Southern vs. FBS teams ==
Year	FBS Opponent	Result	Opponent's conference	Opponent's head coach	Charleston Southern's head coach
2026	Clemson Tigers	TBD	ACC	Dabo Swinney	Gabe Giardina
2026	Georgia Southern Eagles	TBD	Sun Belt	Clay Helton	Gabe Giardina
2025	Coastal Carolina Chanticleers	L, 0–13	Sun Belt	Tim Beck	Gabe Giardina
2025	Vanderbilt Commodores	L, 3–45	SEC	Clark Lea	Gabe Giardina
2024	Florida State Seminoles	L, 7–41	ACC	Mike Norvell	Gabe Giardina
2023	Clemson Tigers	L, 17–66	ACC	Dabo Swinney	Gabe Giardina
2022	North Carolina State Wolfpack	L, 3–55	ACC	Dave Doeren	Autry Denson
2021	Georgia Bulldogs	L, 7–56	SEC	Kirby Smart	Autry Denson
2021	East Carolina Pirates	L, 28–31	The American	Mike Houston	Autry Denson
2019	South Carolina Gamecocks	L, 10–72	SEC	Will Muschamp	Autry Denson
2018	Florida Gators	L, 6–53	SEC	Dan Mullen	Mark Tucker
2017	Indiana Hoosiers	L, 0–27	Big Ten	Tom Allen	Mark Tucker
2017	Mississippi State Bulldogs	L, 0–49	SEC	Dan Mullen	Mark Tucker
2016	Florida State Seminoles	L, 8–52	ACC	Jimbo Fisher	Jamey Chadwell
2015	Alabama Crimson Tide	L, 6–56	SEC	Nick Saban	Jamey Chadwell
2015	Troy Trojans	L, 16–44	Sun Belt	Neal Brown	Jamey Chadwell
2014	Georgia Bulldogs	L, 9–55	SEC	Mark Richt	Jamey Chadwell
2014	Vanderbilt Commodores	L, 20–21	SEC	Derek Mason	Jamey Chadwell
2013	Colorado Buffaloes	L, 10–43	Pac-12	Mike MacIntyre	Jamey Chadwell
2012	Illinois Fighting Illini	L, 0–44	Big Ten	Tim Beckman	Jay Mills
2011	UCF Knights	L, 0–62	CUSA	George O'Leary	Jay Mills
2011	Florida State Seminoles	L, 10–62	ACC	Jimbo Fisher	Jay Mills
2010	Kentucky Wildcats	L, 21–49	SEC	Joker Phillips	Jay Mills
2010	Hawaii Warriors	L, 7–66	WAC	Greg McMackin	Jay Mills
2009	South Florida Bulls	L, 0–59	Big East	Jim Leavitt	Jay Mills
2009	Florida Gators	L, 3–62	SEC	Urban Meyer	Jay Mills
2008	Miami (OH) Redhawks	L, 27–38	MAC	Don Treadwell	Jay Mills
2008	Miami Hurricanes	L, 7–52	ACC	Randy Shannon	Jay Mills
2007	Hawaii Warriors	L, 10–66	WAC	June Jones	Jay Mills
2003	South Florida Bulls	L, 7–55	CUSA	Jim Leavitt	Jay Mills
2002	South Florida Bulls	L, 6–56	CUSA	Jim Leavitt	David Dowd
Charleston Southern 0 – FBS Schools 29

== Future non-conference opponents ==
Announced schedules as of January 13, 2026.

2026	2027	2028	2029
at Georgia Southern	at Florida	at Charlotte	at Georgia Southern
at The Citadel		at East Carolina	
Point			
South Carolina State			
at Clemson			
