= Buccaneer Field =

Multi-purpose stadium in North Charleston, South Carolina, United States

Coordinates: 32°58′42″N 80°4′4″W

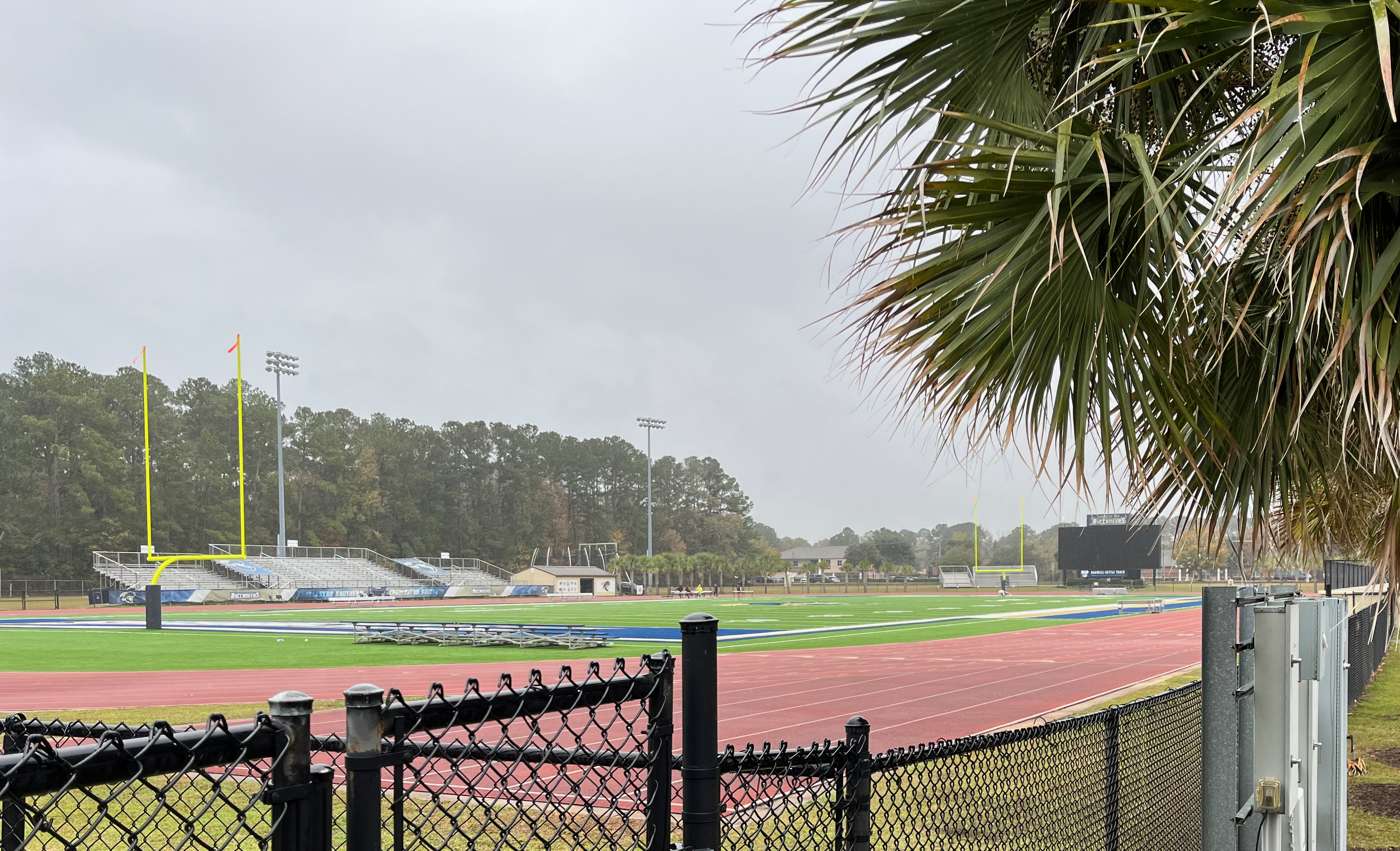
- Interactive map of Buccaneer Field
- Location: 9200 University Boulevard; North Charleston, South Carolina 29406
- Owner: Charleston Southern University
- Operator: Charleston Southern University
- Capacity: 4,000
- Surface: Artificial Turf

Construction
- Opened: 1970

Tenant
- Charleston Southern Buccaneers (NCAA) (1991–present)

Buccaneer Field is a 4,000-seat multi-purpose stadium in North Charleston, South Carolina. It is home to the Charleston Southern University Buccaneers football team. The facility opened in 1970, and has been the school's football stadium since 1991, when the program began. Lights were added in 2014, and in 2015 a new entryway was added alongside new ticketing booths.

== See also ==
- List of NCAA Division I FCS football stadiums
