= List of NCAA Division I athletic directors =

The following is a list of NCAA Division I universities in the United States (listed alphabetically by their schools' athletic brand name) and their current athletic director. This list only includes schools playing Division I football or men's basketball. Schools are alphabetized by commonly used short name, regardless of their official name. The abbreviation "St.", for "Saint", is alphabetized as if it were spelled out.

== Athletic directors ==
Updated as of August 31, 2026.

School	Athletic director	Since	Primary conference	State	Ref.
Abilene Christian	Zack Lassiter	2021	UAC	Texas	
Air Force	Nathan Pine	2019	MW	Colorado	
Akron	Andrew Goodrich	2025	MAC	Ohio	
Alabama A&M	Paul Bryant	2022	SWAC	Alabama	
Alabama	Greg Byrne	2017	SEC	Alabama	
Alabama State	Jason Cable	2021	SWAC	Alabama	
Albany	Mark Benson	2014	America East	New York	
Alcorn State	E. D’Wayne Robinson	2024	SWAC	Mississippi	
American	JM Caparro	2024	Patriot League	District of Columbia	
Appalachian State	Doug Gillin	2015	Sun Belt	North Carolina	
Arizona	Desireé Reed-Francois	2024	Big 12	Arizona	
Arizona State	Graham Rossini	2024	Big 12	Arizona	
Arkansas	Hunter Yurachek	2017	SEC	Arkansas	
Arkansas State	Chris Pezman	2025	Sun Belt	Arkansas	
Arkansas-Pine Bluff	Chris Robinson	2021	SWAC	Arkansas	
Army	Tom Theodorakis	2025	Patriot League	New York	
Auburn	John Cohen	2022	SEC	Alabama	
Austin Peay	Jordan Harmon	2025	UAC	Tennessee	
Ball State	Jeff Mitchell	2023	MAC	Indiana	
Baylor	Doug McNamee	2025	Big 12	Texas	
Bellarmine	Scott Wiegandt	2005	ASUN	Kentucky	
Belmont	Scott Corley	2016	MVC	Tennessee	
Bethune-Cookman	Reggie Theus	2021	SWAC	Florida	
Binghamton	Eugene Marshall Jr.	2023	America East	New York	
Boise State	Jeramiah Dickey	2021	Pac-12	Idaho	
Boston College	Blake James	2022	ACC	Massachusetts	
Boston University	Drew Marrochello	2014	Patriot League	Massachusetts	
Bowling Green	Derek van der Merwe	2022	MAC	Ohio	
Bradley	Chris Reynolds	2015	MVC	Illinois	
Brown	M. Grace Calhoun	2021	Ivy League	Rhode Island	
Bryant	Bill Smith	2022	America East	Rhode Island	
Bucknell	Tim Pavlechko	2025	Patriot League	Pennsylvania	
Buffalo	Mark Alnutt	2018	MAC	New York	
Butler	Grant Leiendecker	2022	Big East	Indiana	
BYU	Brian Santiago	2025	Big 12	Utah	
Cal Poly	Carter Henderson	2025	Big West	California	
Cal State Bakersfield (Note: Alternately Bakersfield.)	Sarah Tuohy (interim)	2025	Big West	California	
Cal State Fullerton	Jim Donovan	2012	Big West	California	
Cal State Northridge (Note: Alternately CSUN.)	Ryan Swartwood	2025	Big West	California	
California	Jay Larson & Jenny Simon-O'Neill	2025	ACC	California	
California Baptist	Micah Parker	2023	Big West	California	
Campbell	Hannah Bazemore	2022	CAA	North Carolina	
Canisius	Bill Maher	2005	Metro	New York	
Central Arkansas	Matt Whiting	2025	UAC	Arkansas	
Central Connecticut	Thomas Pincince	2022	NEC	Connecticut	
Central Michigan	Amy Folan	2020	MAC	Michigan	
Charleston	Matt Roberts	2016	CAA	South Carolina	
Charleston Southern	Jeff Barber	2018	Big South	South Carolina	
Charlotte	Kevin White	2026	American	North Carolina	
Chattanooga	Mark Wharton	2017	SoCon	Tennessee	
Chicago State	Monique Carroll	2022	NEC	Illinois	
Cincinnati	John Cunningham	2020	Big 12	Ohio	
The Citadel	Art Chase	2025	SoCon	South Carolina	
Clemson	Graham Neff	2022	ACC	South Carolina	
Cleveland State	Kelsie Gory Harkey	2024	Horizon League	Ohio	
Coastal Carolina	Chance Miller	2024	Sun Belt	South Carolina	
Colgate	Yariv Amir	2023	Patriot League	New York	
Colorado	Fernando Lovo	2025	Big 12	Colorado	
Colorado State	John Weber	2024	Pac-12	Colorado	
Columbia	Peter Pilling	2015	Ivy League	New York	
Coppin State	Derek Carter	2016	MEAC	Maryland	
Cornell	Nicki Moore	2022	Ivy League	New York	
Creighton	Marcus Blossom	2025	Big East	Nebraska	
Dartmouth	Mike Harrity	2022	Ivy League	New Hampshire	
Davidson	Chris Clunie	2018	A-10	North Carolina	
Dayton	Neil Sullivan	2015	A-10	Ohio	
Delaware	Jordan Skolnick	2026	CUSA	Delaware	
Delaware State	Tony Tucker	2023	MEAC	Delaware	
Denver	Josh Berlo	2022	WCC	Colorado	
DePaul	DeWayne Peevy	2020	Big East	Illinois	
Detroit Mercy	Robert C. Vowels	2013	Horizon League	Michigan	
Drake	Brian Hardin	2017	MVC	Iowa	
Drexel	Maisha Kelly	2021	CAA	Pennsylvania	
Duke	Nina King	2021	ACC	North Carolina	
Duquesne	John Henderson (interim)	2026	A-10	Pennsylvania	
East Carolina	Jon Gilbert	2018	American	North Carolina	
East Tennessee State	Richard Sander	2013	SoCon	Tennessee	
East Texas A&M	Jim Curry	2023	Southland	Texas	
Eastern Illinois	Austin Cheney	2026	OVC	Illinois	
Eastern Kentucky	Kyle Moats	2024	ASUN	Kentucky	
Eastern Michigan	Scott Wetherbee	2017	MAC	Michigan	
Eastern Washington	Tim Collins	2023	Big Sky	Washington	
Elon	Jennifer Strawley	2023	CAA	North Carolina	
Evansville	Ziggy Siegfried	2022	MVC	Indiana	
Fairfield	Paul Schlickmann	2022	Metro	Connecticut	
Fairleigh Dickinson	Bradford Hurlbut	2019	NEC	New Jersey	
FIU	Scott Carr	2021	CUSA	Florida	
Florida	Scott Stricklin	2016	SEC	Florida	
Florida A&M	John Davis	2026	SWAC	Florida	
Florida Atlantic	Michael Graffin (interim)	2026	American	Florida	
Florida Gulf Coast (Note: Alternately FGCU.)	Lauren Leister (interim)	2026	ASUN	Florida	
Florida State	Michael Alford	2021	ACC	Florida	
Fordham	Charles Guthrie	2024	A-10	New York	
Fresno State	Garrey Klassy	2024	Pac-12	California	
Furman	Jason Donnelly	2019	SoCon	South Carolina	
Gardner-Webb	Michael Fahey	2025	Big South	North Carolina	
George Mason	Marvin Lewis	2023	A-10	Virginia	
George Washington	Michael Lipitz	2024	A-10	District of Columbia	
Georgetown	Lee Reed	2010	Big East	District of Columbia	
Georgia	Josh Brooks	2021	SEC	Georgia	
Georgia Southern	Chris Davis	2024	Sun Belt	Georgia	
Georgia State	Charlie Cobb	2014	Sun Belt	Georgia	
Georgia Tech	Ryan Alpert	2025	ACC	Georgia	
Gonzaga	Chris Standiford	2021	Pac-12	Washington	
Grambling State	Trayvean Scott	2021	SWAC	Louisiana	
Grand Canyon	Jamie Boggs	2021	MW	Arizona	
Green Bay	Josh Moon	2021	Horizon League	Wisconsin	
Hampton	Anthony D. Henderson Sr.	2023	CAA	Virginia	
Harvard	Erin McDermott	2020	Ivy League	Massachusetts	
Hawaiʻi	Matt Elliott	2025	MW	Hawaii	
High Point	Dan Hauser	2014	Big South	North Carolina	
Hofstra	Rick Cole	2018	CAA	New York	
Holy Cross	Kit Hughes	2021	Patriot League	Massachusetts	
Houston	Eddie Nuñez	2024	Big 12	Texas	
Houston Christian	Stan Williamson	2026	Southland	Texas	
Howard	Kery Davis	2015	MEAC	District of Columbia	
Idaho	Terry Gawlik	2019	Big Sky	Idaho	
Idaho State	Pauline Thiros	2018	Big Sky	Idaho	
Illinois	Josh Whitman	2016	Big Ten	Illinois	
Illinois State	Jeri Beggs	2025	MVC	Illinois	
Incarnate Word (Note: Alternately UIW.)	Richard Duran	2020	Southland	Texas	
Indiana	Scott Dolson	2020	Big Ten	Indiana	
Indiana State	Nathan Christensen	2024	MVC	Indiana	
Iona	Matt Glovaski	2018	Metro	New York	
Iowa	Beth Goetz	2024	Big Ten	Iowa	
Iowa State	Jamie Pollard	2005	Big 12	Iowa	
IU Indy	Luke Bosso	2023	Horizon League	Indiana	
Jackson State	Ashley Robinson	2016	SWAC	Mississippi	
Jacksonville	Alex Ricker-Gilbert	2016	ASUN	Florida	
Jacksonville State	Greg Seitz	2016	CUSA	Alabama	
James Madison	Matt Roan	2024	Sun Belt	Virginia	
Kansas	Travis Goff	2021	Big 12	Kansas	
Kansas City	Brandon Martin	2018	Summit League	Missouri	
Kansas State	Gene Taylor	2017	Big 12	Kansas	
Kennesaw State	Milton Overton	2017	CUSA	Georgia	
Kent State	Randale Richmond	2021	MAC	Ohio	
Kentucky	J Batt	2026	SEC	Kentucky	
La Salle	Phil Snead (interim)	2026	A-10	Pennsylvania	
Lafayette	Sherryta Freeman	2018	Patriot League	Pennsylvania	
Lamar	Jeff O'Malley	2022	Southland	Texas	
Lehigh	Jeremy Gibson	2025	Patriot League	Pennsylvania	
Le Moyne	Phil Brown	2025	NEC	New York	
Liberty	Ian McCaw	2016	CUSA	Virginia	
Lindenwood	Jason Coomer	2022	OVC	Missouri	
Lipscomb	Philip Hutcheson	2008	ASUN	Tennessee	
Little Rock	Frank Cuervo	2024	UAC	Arkansas	
LIU	Elliott Charles	2024	NEC	New York	
Long Beach State	Bobby Smitheran	2023	Big West	California	
Longwood	Tim Hall	2022	Big South	Virginia	
Louisiana	Bryan Maggard	2017	Sun Belt	Louisiana	
Louisiana-Monroe (Note: Alternately ULM.)	S. J. Tuohy	2025	Sun Belt	Louisiana	
Louisiana Tech	Ryan Ivey	2024	Sun Belt	Louisiana	
Louisville	Josh Heird	2021	ACC	Kentucky	
Loyola Chicago	Steve Watson	2014	A-10	Illinois	
Loyola (MD)	Donna Woodruff	2017	Patriot League	Maryland	
Loyola Marymount	Craig Pintens	2018	WCC	California	
LSU	Verge Ausberry	2025	SEC	Louisiana	
LSU New Orleans	Michael Giorlando	2026	Southland	Louisiana	
Maine	Jude Killy	2023	America East	Maine	
Manhattan	Irma Garcia	2023	Metro	New York	
Marist	Tim Murray	1995	Metro	New York	
Marquette	Mike Broeker	2025	Big East	Wisconsin	
Marshall	Gerard Harrison	2025	Sun Belt	West Virginia	
Maryland	James E. Smith	2025	Big Ten	Maryland	
Maryland Eastern Shore (Note: Alternately UMES.)	Tara Owens	2022	MEAC	Maryland	
McNeese	Bridget Martin	2026	Southland	Louisiana	
Memphis	Ed Scott	2022	American	Tennessee	
Mercer	Jim Cole	2010	SoCon	Georgia	
Mercyhurst	Joe Spano	2023	NEC	Pennsylvania	
Merrimack	Joe Foley	2025	NEC	Massachusetts	
Miami (FL)	Brian Baptiste & Rachelle Paul (interim)	2021	ACC	Florida	
Miami (OH)	David Sayler	2012	MAC	Ohio	
Michigan	Warde Manuel	2016	Big Ten	Michigan	
Michigan State	Dan Bartholomae	2026	Big Ten	Michigan	
Middle Tennessee	Chris Massaro	2005	CUSA	Tennessee	
Milwaukee	Amanda Braun	2013	Horizon League	Wisconsin	
Minnesota	Mark Coyle	2016	Big Ten	Minnesota	
Mississippi State	Zac Selmon	2023	SEC	Mississippi	
Mississippi Valley State	Alecia Shields-Gadson	2025	SWAC	Mississippi	
Missouri	Laird Veatch	2024	SEC	Missouri	
Missouri State	Patrick Ransdell	2024	CUSA	Missouri	
Monmouth	Jennifer Sansevero	2024	CAA	New Jersey	
Montana	Kent Haslam	2012	Big Sky	Montana	
Montana State	Leon Costello	2016	Big Sky	Montana	
Morehead State	Kelly Wells	2023	OVC	Kentucky	
Morgan State	Dena Freeman-Patton	2022	MEAC	Maryland	
Mount St. Mary's	Brad Davis	2023	Metro	Maryland	
Murray State	Nico Yantko	2022	MVC	Kentucky	
Navy	Michael Kelly	2025	Patriot League	Maryland	
NC State	Boo Corrigan	2019	ACC	North Carolina	
Nebraska	Troy Dannen	2024	Big Ten	Nebraska	
Nevada	Stephanie Rempe	2022	MW	Nevada	
New Hampshire	Allison Rich	2022	America East	New Hampshire	
New Mexico	Ryan Berryman	2026	MW	New Mexico	
New Mexico State	Joe Fields	2025	CUSA	New Mexico	
Niagara	Simon B. Gray	2022	Metro	New York	
Nicholls	Jonathan Terrell	2020	Southland	Louisiana	
NJIT	Lenny Kaplan	2000	America East	New Jersey	
Norfolk State	Melody Webb	2020	MEAC	Virginia	
North Alabama	Josh Looney	2021	UAC	Alabama	
North Carolina	Steve Newmark	2026	ACC	North Carolina	
North Carolina A&T	Earl Hilton	2010	CAA	North Carolina	
North Carolina Central	Louis Perkins	2022	MEAC	North Carolina	
North Dakota	Bill Chaves	2018	Summit League	North Dakota	
North Dakota State	Matt Larsen	2014	Summit League	North Dakota	
North Florida	Nick Marrow	2021	ASUN	Florida	
North Texas	Jared Mosley	2022	American	Texas	
Northeastern	Jim Madigan	2021	CAA	Massachusetts	
Northern Arizona	Uri Farkas	2025	Big Sky	Arizona	
Northern Illinois (Note: Alternately NIU.)	Sean Frazier	2013	Horizon League	Illinois	
Northern Iowa (Note: Alternately UNI.)	Megan Franklin	2024	MVC	Iowa	
Northern Kentucky	John Mason (interim)	2026	Horizon League	Kentucky	
Northwestern	Mark Jackson	2024	Big Ten	Illinois	
Northwestern State	Kevin Bostian	2022	Southland	Louisiana	
Notre Dame	Pete Bevacqua	2024	ACC	Indiana	
Oakland	Steve Waterfield	2018	Horizon League	Michigan	
Ohio	Slade Larscheid	2025	MAC	Ohio	
Ohio State	Ross Bjork	2024	Big Ten	Ohio	
Oklahoma	Roger Denny	2026	SEC	Oklahoma	
Oklahoma State	Chad Weiberg	2021	Big 12	Oklahoma	
Old Dominion	Wood Selig	2010	Sun Belt	Virginia	
Ole Miss	Keith Carter	2019	SEC	Mississippi	
Omaha	Adrian Dowell	2021	Summit League	Nebraska	
Oral Roberts	Tim Johnson	2015	Summit League	Oklahoma	
Oregon	Rob Mullens	2010	Big Ten	Oregon	
Oregon State	Kevin Griffin	2026	Pac-12	Oregon	
Pacific	Adam Tschuor	2023	WCC	California	
Penn	Alanna Wren	2025	Ivy League	Pennsylvania	
Penn State	Pat Kraft	2022	Big Ten	Pennsylvania	
Pepperdine	Tanner Gardner	2024	WCC	California	
Pittsburgh	Allen Greene	2024	ACC	Pennsylvania	
Portland	Scott Leykam	2012	WCC	Oregon	
Portland State	Matt Billings	2024	Big Sky	Oregon	
Prairie View A&M	Anton Goff	2023	SWAC	Texas	
Presbyterian	Dee Nichols	2023	Big South	South Carolina	
Princeton	John Mack	2021	Ivy League	New Jersey	
Providence	Steven Napolillo	2022	Big East	Rhode Island	
Purdue	Mike Bobinski	2016	Big Ten	Indiana	
Purdue Fort Wayne	Kelley Hartley Hutton	2014	Horizon League	Indiana	
Queens	Cherie Swarthout	2016	ASUN	North Carolina	
Quinnipiac	Greg Amodio	2015	Metro	Connecticut	
Radford	Robert Lineburg	2007	Big South	Virginia	
Rhode Island	Pat Lyons	2026	A-10	Rhode Island	
Rice	Tommy McClelland	2023	American	Texas	
Richmond	John Hardt	2018	A-10	Virginia	
Rider	Don Harnum	2005	Metro	New Jersey	
Robert Morris	Vacant	2026	Horizon League	Pennsylvania	
Rutgers	Keli Zinn	2025	Big Ten	New Jersey	
Sacramento State	Mark Orr	2017	Big West	California	
Sacred Heart	Judy Ann Riccio	2021	NEC	Connecticut	
St. Bonaventure	Bob Beretta	2024	A-10	New York	
St. John's	Ed Kull	2024	Big East	New York	
Saint Joseph's	Ashwin Puri	2026	A-10	Pennsylvania	
Saint Louis	Chris May	2008	A-10	Missouri	
Saint Mary's	Mike Matoso	2017	WCC	California	
Saint Peter's	Katie Arcuri	2023	Metro	New Jersey	
St. Thomas	Phil Esten	2019	Summit League	Minnesota	
Sam Houston	Bobby Williams	1997	CUSA	Texas	
Samford	Martin Newton	2011	SoCon	Alabama	
San Diego	Kimya Massey	2024	WCC	California	
San Diego State	John David Wicker	2016	Pac-12	California	
San Francisco	Brent Blaylock	2026	WCC	California	
San Jose State	Jeff Konya	2021	MW	California	
Santa Clara	Heather Owen	2024	WCC	California	
Seattle	Shaney Fink	2016	WCC	Washington	
Seton Hall	Bryan Felt	2019	Big East	New Jersey	
Siena	John D'Argenio	1993	Metro	New York	
SIU Edwardsville (Note: Alternately SIUE.)	Andrew Gavin	2023	OVC	Illinois	
SMU	Dameon Evans	2025	ACC	Texas	
South Alabama	Daniel McCarthy	2026	Sun Belt	Alabama	
South Carolina	Jeremiah Donati	2025	SEC	South Carolina	
South Carolina State	Nathan Cochran	2025	MEAC	South Carolina	
South Dakota	Jon Schemmel	2023	Summit League	South Dakota	
South Dakota State	Justin Sell	2009	Summit League	South Dakota	
South Florida	Rob Huggins	2025	American	Florida	
Southeast Missouri State (Note: Alternately SEMO or Southeast Missouri.)	Brady Barke	2016	OVC	Missouri	
Southeastern Louisiana	Jay Artigues	2013	Southland	Louisiana	
Southern Illinois	Tim Leonard	2022	MVC	Illinois	
Southern	Roman Banks	2017	SWAC	Louisiana	
Southern Indiana	Jon Mark Hall	2002	OVC	Indiana	
Southern Miss	Jeremy McClain	2019	Sun Belt	Mississippi	
Southern Utah	Myndee Larsen	2026	UAC	Utah	
Stanford	John Donahoe	2025	ACC	California	
Stephen F. Austin	Michael Mcbroom	2024	Southland	Texas	
Stetson	Ricky Ray	2024	ASUN	Florida	
Stonehill	Dean O'Keeffe	2015	NEC	Massachusetts	
Stony Brook	Shawn Heilbron	2014	CAA	New York	
Syracuse	Bryan Blair	2026	ACC	New York	
Tarleton State	Steve Uryasz	2024	UAC	Texas	
TCU	Mike Buddie	2024	Big 12	Texas	
Temple	Arthur Johnson	2021	American	Pennsylvania	
Tennessee	Danny White	2021	SEC	Tennessee	
Tennessee State	Mikki Allen	2020	OVC	Tennessee	
Tennessee Tech	Casey Fox	2025	SoCon	Tennessee	
Texas	Chris Del Conte	2017	SEC	Texas	
Texas A&M	Trev Alberts	2024	SEC	Texas	
Texas A&M-Corpus Christi	Adrian Rodriguez	2022	Southland	Texas	
Texas Southern	Paula Jackson (interim)	2025	SWAC	Texas	
Texas State	Don Coryell	2021	Pac-12	Texas	
Texas Tech	Kirby Hocutt	2011	Big 12	Texas	
Toledo	Tom Moreland	2026	MAC	Ohio	
Towson	Steve Eigenbrot	2022	CAA	Maryland	
Troy	Kyle George	2025	Sun Belt	Alabama	
Tulane	David Harris	2023	American	Louisiana	
Tulsa	Justin Moore	2024	American	Oklahoma	
UAB	Mark Ingram	2015	American	Alabama	
UC Davis	Rocko DeLuca	2021	MW	California	
UC Irvine	Paula Smith	2019	Big West	California	
UC Riverside	Greg Paules	2026	Big West	California	
UC San Diego	Andy Fee	2025	Big West	California	
UC Santa Barbara	Kelly Barsky	2023	Big West	California	
UCF	Terry Mohajir	2021	Big 12	Florida	
UCLA	Tim Harris	2026	Big Ten	California	
UConn	David Benedict	2016	Big East	Connecticut	
UIC	Andrea Williams	2024	MVC	Illinois	
UMass (Note: Alternately Massachusetts.)	Ryan Bamford	2015	A-10	Massachusetts	
UMass Lowell	Lynn Coutts	2024	America East	Massachusetts	
UMBC	Tiffany Tucker	2024	America East	Maryland	
UNC Asheville	Janet Cone	2004	Big South	North Carolina	
UNCG	Brian Mackin	2022	SoCon	North Carolina	
UNCW	Michael Oblinger	2023	CAA	North Carolina	
UNLV	Erick Harper	2022	MW	Nevada	
USC	Jennifer Cohen	2023	Big Ten	California	
USC Upstate	Matthew Martin	2023	Big South	South Carolina	
UT Arlington	Jon Fagg	2022	UAC	Texas	
UT Martin	Kurt McGuffin	2017	OVC	Tennessee	
Utah	Mark Harlan	2018	Big 12	Utah	
Utah State	Cameron Walker	2025	Pac-12	Utah	
Utah Tech	Ken Beazer	2022	Big Sky	Utah	
Utah Valley	Dr. Jared Sumsion	2019	Big West	Utah	
UTEP	Jim Senter	2017	MW	Texas	
UTRGV (Note: Alternately UT Rio Grande Valley.)	Chasse Conque	2025	Southland	Texas	
UTSA	Lisa Campos	2017	American	Texas	
Valparaiso	Laurel Hosmer	2024	MVC	Indiana	
Vanderbilt	Candice Storey Lee	2020	SEC	Tennessee	
VCU	Ed McLaughlin	2012	A-10	Virginia	
Vermont	Jeff Schulman	2016	America East	Vermont	
Villanova	Eric Roedl	2025	Big East	Pennsylvania	
Virginia	Carla Williams	2017	ACC	Virginia	
Virginia Tech	Brian White	2026	ACC	Virginia	
VMI	Jamaal Walton	2024	SoCon	Virginia	
Wagner	Ariel Pesante	2026	NEC	New York	
Wake Forest	John Currie	2019	ACC	North Carolina	
Washington	Patrick Chun	2024	Big Ten	Washington	
Washington State	Jon Haarlow	2025	Pac-12	Washington	
Weber State	Tim Crompton	2019	Big Sky	Utah	
West Florida	Dave Scott	2008	ASUN	Florida	
West Georgia	Jason Carmichael	2021	UAC	Georgia	
West Virginia	Wren Baker	2022	Big 12	West Virginia	
Western Carolina	Kyle Pifer	2025	SoCon	North Carolina	
Western Illinois	Shelby Borchardt (interim)	2026	OVC	Illinois	
Western Kentucky	Todd Stewart	2012	CUSA	Kentucky	
Western Michigan	Dan Bartholomae	2022	MAC	Michigan	
Wichita State	Kevin Saal	2022	American	Kansas	
William & Mary	Brian Mann	2021	CAA	Virginia	
Winthrop	Chuck Rey	2021	Big South	South Carolina	
Wisconsin	Shawn Eichorst	2026	Big Ten	Wisconsin	
Wofford	Scott Kull	2021	SoCon	South Carolina	
Wright State	Robert Ray (interim)	2026	Horizon League	Ohio	
Wyoming	Tom Burman	2006	MW	Wyoming	
Xavier	Greg Christopher	2023	Big East	Ohio	
Yale	Victoria Chun	2018	Ivy League	Connecticut	
Youngstown State	Ron Strollo	2001	Horizon League	Ohio	

== See also ==
- National Association of Collegiate Directors of Athletics
- List of college athletic programs by U.S. state
