= Clifford Charles Sweet =

American civil rights lawyer

Clifford Charles Sweet (August 3, 1936 – October 3, 2010) was a civil rights attorney based out of Alameda County, California. He served as head of the Alameda County Legal Aid Society from 1985 to 2002. He fought a number of civil rights issues including redlining by banks, unfair housing policies and police brutality.

== Biography ==
Clifford Charles Sweet was born on August 3, 1936, in Jupiter, Florida, the youngest of nine children to George and Ruth Sweet. In 1957, he moved to San Jose, California, to live with his brothers Wester and Jim, enrolling in San Jose City College. He later graduated from San Jose State University with a degree in political science, inspired by the civil rights movement to pursue law. He earned his Juris Doctor from Lincoln Law School in 1963.

Sweet joined the Legal Aid Society of Alameda County in 1967 and was named Executive Attorney in 1971, a role he held until retiring in 1998. His work included challenging redlining practices, promoting minority hiring in Oakland's police and fire departments, and defending low-income tenants, reflecting the era's civil rights challenges. Sweet was even a founding member of Oakland's Police-Community Relations unit formed in the 1970s.

Sweet's professional journey began when he joined the Legal Aid Society of Alameda County in 1967, an organization dedicated to providing legal aid to low-income individuals. By 1971, he had risen to the position of Executive Attorney, a role he maintained until his retirement in 1998. His tenure coincided with significant civil rights challenges in Alameda County, particularly in Oakland, where issues like redlining, employment discrimination, and housing rights were prevalent.

Sweet was particularly instrumental in the 1970's in fighting for women and minority rights as it pertained to hiring practices of local police and firemen.

Sweet authored the book How to Eliminate Crack Houses in Your Neighborhood, a community guide on how to gather evidence and, file small claims lawsuits in conjunction with other residents, against building owners whose properties had become crack houses. The guide was meant for Oakland but was so effective, other neighborhoods like Palo Alto handed out copies and started following the guide to clean up their neighborhoods. The book resulted in helping close over seven hundred crack houses in three years.

In 1982, Sweet filed to stop the Citicorp takeover of Fidelity, a California savings and loan bank with 81 branches in California. Sweet was opposed to Citicorp's banking policies towards South Africa given that Fidelity served black neighborhoods. Fidelity was eventually acquired for $2.9 billion once Citicorp addressed the concerns.

In 1998, Sweet and his brother James took up helping the cause of helping the city of Oakland, California to create the first US Friendship City agreement with Santiago de Cuba, even though Cuba was on the restricted travel list.

In 1998, the Alameda County Legal Aid Society lost its funding due to a lack of record keeping showing it had not worked on prohibited cases. Alameda was the only office that lost funding, eventually merging with another local legal aid society to become Bay Area Legal Aid.

Sweet died on October 3, 2010, leaving behind a legacy of over thirty years fighting for civil rights in the Bay area including testifying before Congress and having two decisions affirmed by California Supreme Court.
