= John Patrick Devereux =

American soccer player and coach

John Devereux
Personal information
- Full name: John Patrick Devereux
- Date of birth: May 20, 1963 (age 63)
- Place of birth: Dayton, Ohio, U.S.
- Height: 6 ft 0 in (1.83 m)
- Positions: Midfielder; defender

College career
Years	Team	Apps	(Gls)
- Charleston Southern Buccaneers

Senior career*
Years	Team	Apps	(Gls)
1993–????	Charleston Battery		
- Limoges
- * Club domestic league appearances and goals

John Patrick Devereux (born May 20, 1963) is an American retired soccer midfielder/defender who played professionally for the Charleston Battery and overseas.

Devereux was born to a French mother and English father, Frederick Devereux, who was in the United States Air Force. He attended Charleston Southern University. After college, he played in Limoges, France before returning to the United States where he signed with the Charleston Battery for the 1993 USISL season.

Devereux was head soccer coach at Charleston Southern University, previously Baptist College, has also coached soccer for a number of years at schools and for clubs including college and youth-teams in Mount Pleasant, South Carolina. He has two sons and one daughter. He currently lives in Hanahan, South Carolina, and coaches the Varsity Team at Hanahan High School as well.
