= Lincoln University (California) =

University in Oakland, California

- Motto: Learn More, Earn More, Much More!
- Type: Private university
- Established: 1919; 107 years ago
- President: Mikhail Brodsky
- Students: 573
- Location: Oakland, California, US; 37°48′17.26″N 122°16′10.49″W
- Colors: Oaklander red and gold
- Website: lincolnuca.edu

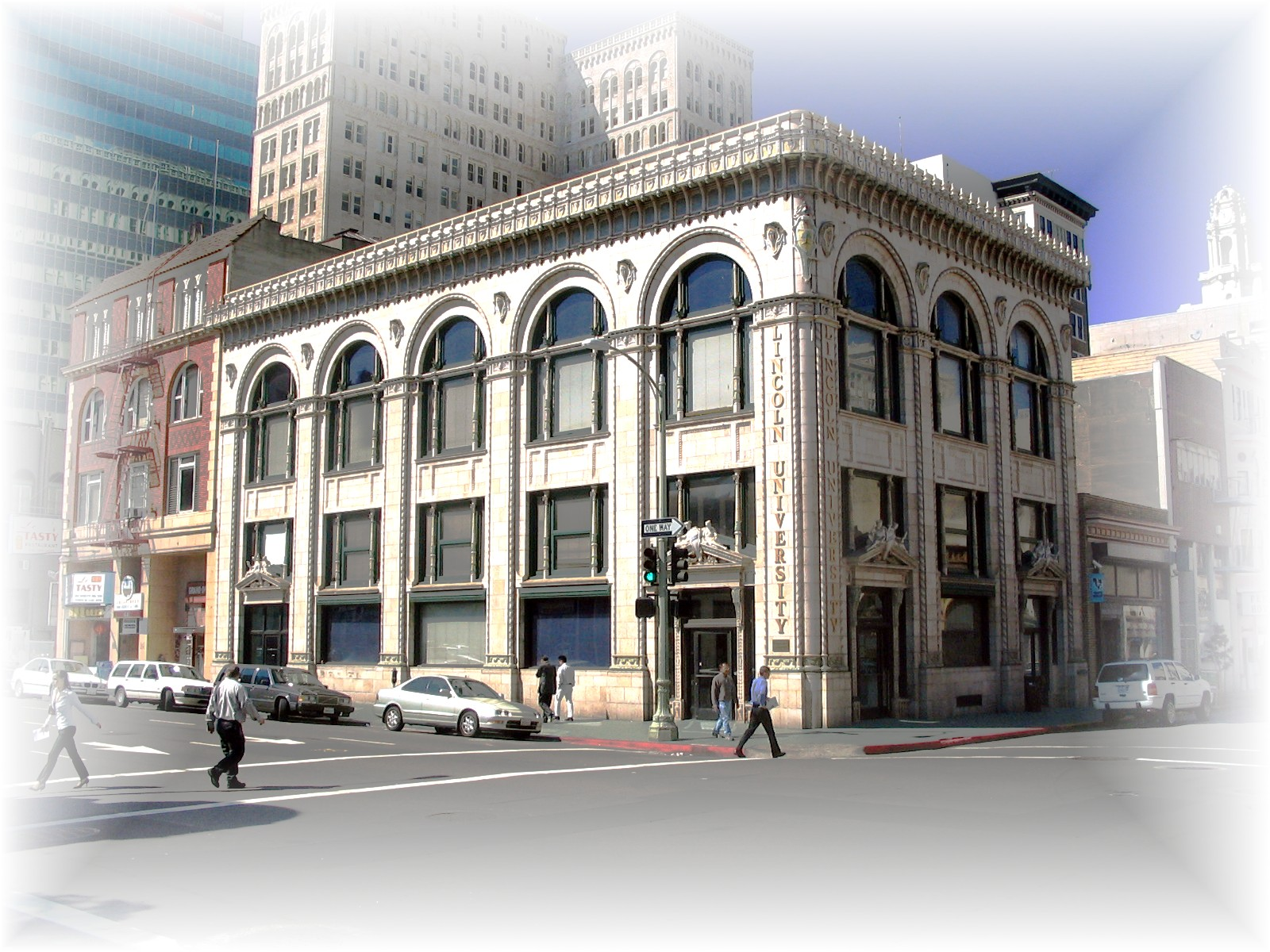
Lincoln University from the northeast

Lincoln University is a private university in Oakland, California, United States. It enrolls more than 500 students in undergraduate- and graduate-level programs in business administration as well as an English-language program, certificate programs, and bachelor of science programs.

== History ==
Named to honor President Abraham Lincoln, Lincoln University was founded in 1919 and chartered under the laws of California in 1926. The first university officers were Benjamin Franklin Lickey, president, and Edward J. Silver, vice president and educational director. Lickey with his wife Susan had in 1919 founded a law study program in San Francisco for veterans returning after the First World War and other working adults, which offered evening classes to part-time students, while he was working as the western representative of the Law Department of the La Salle Extension University of Chicago which offered degrees through correspondence courses. The program developed into a tutorial center with a broader curriculum. One of its early slogans was "The Shortcut to Success"; it offered "reasonable terms" and a "money-back guarantee".

By 1927 Lincoln University was operating on the Arcade Floor of the Phelan Building on Market Street in San Francisco with Colleges of Law and Commerce and a Department of Special Courses and Coaching, offering both day and evening classes as a co-educational institution.

An advertisement of that year showed Lincoln University offering college courses in law, commerce, foreign trade, and business administration and special courses and coaching in bar examination preparation, advertising, journalism, and public speaking. It also maintained a junior college and high school program, which operated a preparatory school and special preparation for College Board examinations. At this time Lickey served as president of Lincoln University while continuing as the agent of LaSalle Extension University.

Its nonprofit status was recognized by the Internal Revenue Service in 1950 and in 1961 a second campus was opened in San Jose. By 1987, the San Jose campus had become the location of the university's law school programs. It separated in 1993 to become the independent Lincoln Law School of San Jose. The university moved from San Francisco to Oakland in December 1999.

Lincoln University was featured in a March 2011 Chronicle of Higher Education article entitled "Little-Known Colleges Exploit Visa Loopholes to Make Millions Off Foreign Students."

== Academics ==
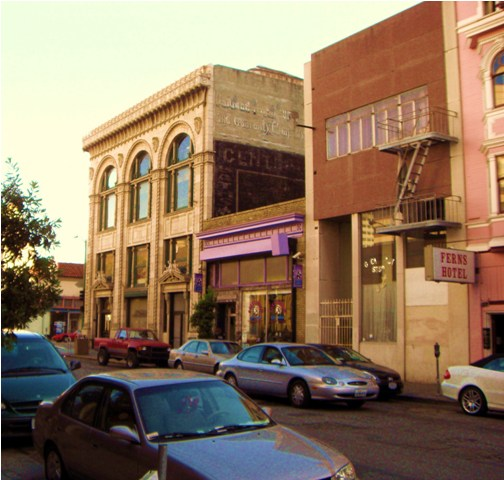
Lincoln University from the northwest

Lincoln University offers the following degree programs:

- Master of Business Administration
- Master of Science
- Bachelor of Arts
- Bachelor of Science

== Ranking ==
In 2024, U.S. News & World Report ranked Lincoln University Unranked in Business Schools.

== Undergraduate admissions ==
Lincoln University has an open admission policy, admitting all applicants so long as certain minimum requirements are met. For 2024, Lincoln University's enrolled students had an average 2.6 high school GPA.

== Accreditation ==
Lincoln University is accredited (currently on probation) by the WASC Senior College and University Commission (WSCUC). It was previously accredited by the Accrediting Council for Independent Colleges and Schools (ACICS) to award master's and bachelor's degrees. The university's graduate business programs are accredited by the International Accreditation Council for Business Education (IACBE).

=== U.S. Department of Education additional oversight ===
It is on the U.S. Department of Education's Federal Student Aid (FSA) "List of Institutions on Heightened Cash Monitoring as of December 1, 2019." The U.S. Department of Education may place institutions on a Heightened Cash Monitoring (HCM) payment method to provide additional oversight of cash management. Heightened Cash Monitoring is a step that FSA can take with institutions to provide additional oversight for a number of financial or federal compliance issues, some of which may be serious and others that may be less troublesome. The list notes "severe findings" for Lincoln University.

== Athletics ==
In May 2023, ahead of its third year of sponsoring sports, Lincoln University announced that four of its five teams had become affiliated with the new Southwestern States Intercollegiate Conference (SWSIC). The men's and women's soccer and basketball programs joined the SWSIC, while football would remain independent. The SWSIC is not connected with any national affiliation organization, but many of its members are also members of the National Christian College Athletic Association to which Lincoln does not belong.
