= Janet Cone =

American athletic administrator and basketball coach (born 1955)

Current position
- Title: Athletic director
- Team: UNC Asheville
- Conference: Big South

Biographical details
- Born: December 7, 1955 (age 70); Summerville, South Carolina

Administrative career (AD unless noted)
- 2002–2004: Samford (associate AD)
- 2004–present: UNC Asheville

Janet Cone (born December 7, 1955) is an American college athletic director for the UNC Asheville Bulldogs, a position she has held since 2004. In 2015, she became a member of the National Collegiate Athletic Association Division I men's basketball committee. She has also been a women's basketball coach for several teams, including Saint Leo University, Western Carolina University, Mars Hill College and Samford University, as well as an AD for some of those.

== Background ==
Cone was born in Summerville, South Carolina, to Joseph and Florence Cone, who have operated a logging business since 1954. Cone attended Summerville High School, playing basketball for four years. In 1978, she graduated magna cum laude with a bachelor's degree from Furman University, where she played basketball and field hockey. She later obtained a master's degree from the University of South Carolina.

== Coaching and executive career ==
From 1986 to 1990, Cone was head coach of both the Mars Hill College volleyball and women's basketball teams. She was head coach of the women's basketball team at Western Carolina University from 1990 until 1993. At Saint Leo University, she was head women's basketball coach and volleyball coach, before becoming assistant director of athletics. In 1996, Cone became the first head coach of the Samford Bulldogs women's basketball team. After five years, she was appointed associate athletics director. Since 2004, she has been athletics director for UNC Asheville.

While at UNC Ashville, Cone has managed to get its women's golf program into the 2016 NCAA Division I, only the second sport added since 2010. She also revived the women's swimming program in 2012, the first time that the UNCA athletics department had added a sport in 20 years.

In 2013, Cone was one of only 28 directors of athletics to be named as Under Armour AD of the Year by the National Association of Collegiate Directors of Athletics. In September 2015, Cone became the only woman added to the NCAA Division I men's basketball committee, which selects and seeds the teams for NCAA Men's Division I Basketball Championship. Her tenure is expected to be ten years.

== See also ==
- List of NCAA Division I athletic directors
