= Pat Kraft =

American college athletics administrator

Current position
- Title: Athletic director
- Team: Penn State
- Conference: Big Ten

Biographical details
- Born: Libertyville, Illinois, U.S.
- Education: Indiana

Administrative career (AD unless noted)
- 2009–2011: Indiana (assistant AD)
- 2011–2013: Loyola (associate AD)
- 2013–2015: Temple (deputy AD)
- 2015–2020: Temple
- 2020–2022: Boston College
- 2022–present: Penn State

Patrick Kraft is an American college athletics administrator. He was named athletic director for Pennsylvania State University in April 2022. Kraft was previously an athletic director for Temple University and Boston College.

== Early life and education ==
Patrick Kraft was born in Libertyville, Illinois. Kraft attended Indiana University Bloomington and walked on the football team, eventually earning a scholarship. At Indiana, Kraft received three degrees, including his PhD in Sports Management. Later in his athletic director career, Kraft became an assistant athletics director for Indiana University.

== Athletic director ==
=== Temple ===
After serving for two years as the deputy athletic director for Temple University, Kraft became the athletic director in 2015. With the help of head coach Matt Rhule, Temple's football program enjoyed great athletic success during his tenure.

=== Boston College ===
Following six years as athletic director, Kraft became the athletic director for Boston College in 2020. Boston College won its first women's national championship, winning the women's lacrosse championship.
