= Coastal Carolina Chanticleers =

Sports teams of Coastal Carolina University

- University: Coastal Carolina University
- Nickname: Chanticleers (Chants)
- NCAA: Division I (FBS)
- Conference: Sun Belt (primary); ASUN (women's lacrosse)
- Athletic director: Chance Miller
- Location: Conway, South Carolina
- Varsity teams: 19 (8 men's, 11 women's)
- Football stadium: Brooks Stadium
- Basketball arena: HTC Center
- Baseball stadium: Springs Brooks Stadium
- Softball stadium: St. John Stadium
- Soccer stadium: CCU Soccer Complex
- Tennis venue: Stevens Tennis Complex
- Colors: Teal, bronze, and black
- Mascot: Chauncey
- Fight song: CCU Fight Song
- Website: goccusports.com

Team NCAA championships
- 1

The Coastal Carolina Chanticleers (/ˈʃɒntɪklɪər/, SHON-tih-clear) are the athletic teams that represent Coastal Carolina University. They participate in Division I of the NCAA as a member of the Sun Belt Conference (SBC) in most sports, having joined that conference as a full but non-football member on July 1, 2016. At that time, the football team began a transition from the second-level Division I Football Championship Subdivision (FCS) to the top-level Football Bowl Subdivision (FBS). The team played the 2016 season as an FCS independent, joined SBC football for the 2017 season, and became full FBS members for 2018 and beyond. A Chanticleer is a proud and fierce rooster. Before joining the SBC, the Chanticleers had been members of the Big South Conference since that league's formation in 1983. Coastal fields varsity teams in 19 sports, 8 for men and 11 for women. The university regularly competed for the Sasser Cup, the Big South's trophy for the university with the best sports program among the member institutions, winning the trophy nine times, tied with rival Liberty University.

Until the early 1960s, Coastal's teams were known as the Trojans. When the school became an extension of the University of South Carolina, the push was made for a mascot more in line with the parent's mascot, the Gamecock; the ultimate choice was the Chanticleer, the proud, witty rooster made famous in "The Nun's Priest's Tale" of Chaucer's The Canterbury Tales (the mascot itself would be named Zachary). When Coastal became an independent university in 1993, despite some calls to change the mascot as part of "a complete split from USC", the Chanticleer remained the school's mascot. Coastal has developed in-state rivalries with Charleston Southern, Clemson, College of Charleston, Furman, Presbyterian, South Carolina, South Carolina State, The Citadel, USC Upstate, Winthrop, and Wofford. Their fiercest in-state rivals are Charleston Southern, College of Charleston, and Winthrop. Coastal has rivalries with every Sun Belt school in the East Division (Appalachian State, Georgia State, Georgia Southern, South Alabama, and Troy). Coastal's main Sun Belt rivals are Appalachian State and Georgia Southern. They also have a rivalry with Liberty that dates back to when both universities were members of the Big South Conference.

The volleyball program is one of the most successful teams in the country. It won four consecutive conference championships (Big South 2014, 2015) (Sun Belt 2016, 2017). Leah Hardeman ('14–'17) is the only player in Division I history to win four conference player of the year awards. The baseball team has developed into a national powerhouse as well; it won the national title in 2016.

As of the 2022–23 school year, the SBC sponsors all of Coastal's sports except women's lacrosse, which plays in the ASUN Conference. The SBC reinstated men's soccer (a fall sport) for the 2022 season, and added beach volleyball (a spring sport) for the 2023 season.

== Conference affiliations ==
Sun Belt Conference logo in Coastal Carolina's colors

- Big South Conference (1983–2016)
- Sun Belt Conference (2016–present)

== Sports sponsored ==
Men's sports	Women's sports
Baseball	Basketball
Basketball	Beach volleyball
Cross country	Cross country
Football	Golf
Golf	Lacrosse
Soccer	Soccer
Tennis	Softball
Track & field^{1}	Tennis
	Track & field^{2}
	Volleyball
^{1} – Men's track and field includes only outdoor^{2} – Women's track and field includes both indoor and outdoor

=== Baseball ===
Coastal Carolina's baseball program has been the university's most consistent program in terms of success. The program has received #1 regional seeds on four occasions (2005, 2007, 2008, 2010) and won 50+ games in 2005, 2007, 2008, and 2010. In addition, the Chanticleers have hosted NCAA Regionals in 2007, 2008, and 2010 and a Super Regional in 2010. In 2016, the Chanticleers defeated the Arizona Wildcats two games to one in the best of three national championship series to win the first ever national title in school history. It was also the first national title ever won by a Big South Conference member in a team sport, and came the day before Coastal joined the Sun Belt.

=== Men's basketball ===
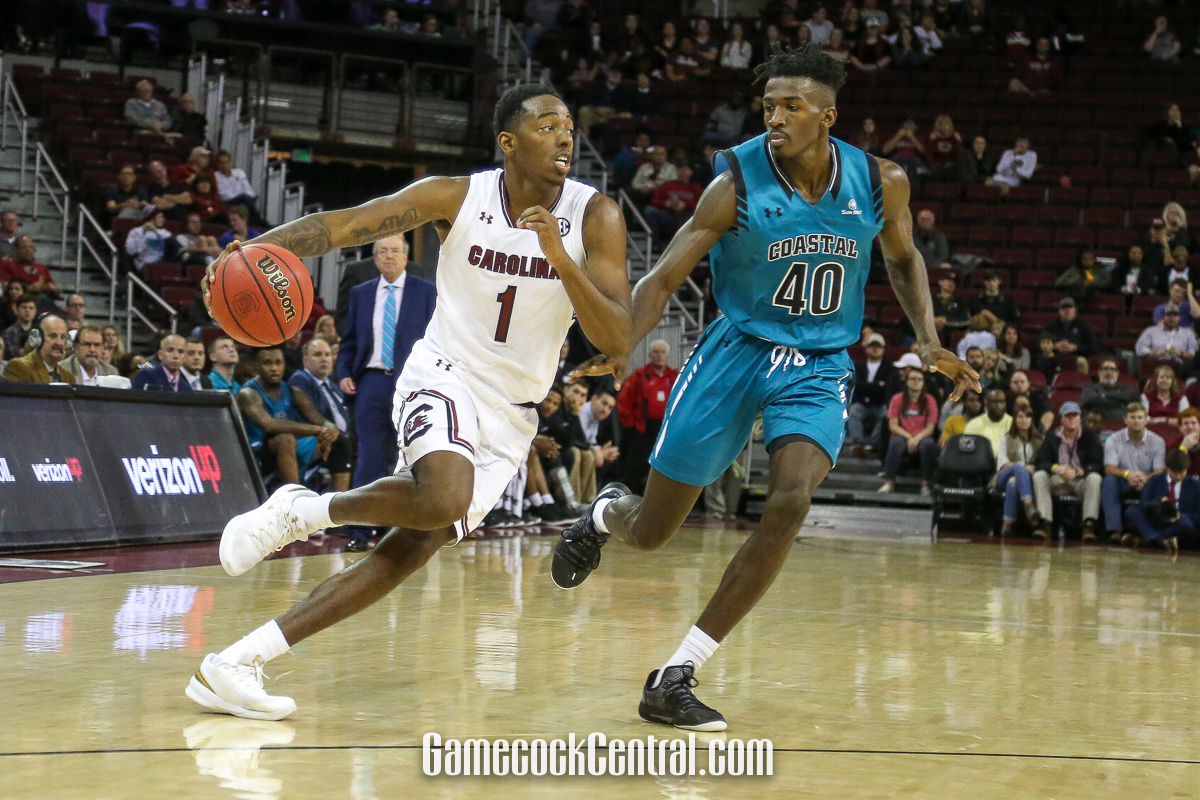
Coastal Carolina men's game v South Carolina in 2018

The Coastal Carolina men's basketball program is coached by Justin Gray, who has also served as head coach at Western Carolina University. The program achieved the majority of its success during the early 1990s, reaching the NCAA tournament in 1991 and 1993. The 2009–10 CCU Basketball team set a school record for most wins in a season while finishing with a record of 28 wins and 6 losses. After losing to Winthrop at home in the conference championship game, the team suffered a 65–49 loss at UAB in the first round of the 2010 NIT. The 2010–11 CCU Basketball team would also finish with a 28–6 record, at one time winning 22 consecutive games. The team lost to UNC Asheville in the conference championship game 60–47. Coastal went on to lose to Alabama in the first round of the 2011 NIT. Coastal returned to the NCAA Tournament for the first time in 21 years in 2014, after defeating rival Winthrop in the championship game of the Big South Tournament, but losing to first-seed Virginia in their only game of the tournament. In 2015, Coastal Carolina again returned to the NCAA tournament after beating Winthrop, for the second year in a row, in the Big South Conference championship game 70–81. This is the first time in school history Coastal has made back-to-back appearances in the tournament.

=== Football ===
Coastal Carolina's football program played its inaugural season in 2003. The team is coached by Tim Beck, head coach since the 2023 season. In the program's short history, wins have already been recorded over traditional Football Championship Subdivision powers such as James Madison University (ranked #1 at the time), Furman University and Wofford College. The school's highest-profile win to date came in 2020 in a much-publicized game against BYU. The program won seven Big South Conference championships before officially joining Sun Belt Conference football on July 1, 2017.

=== Men's golf ===
The Coastal Carolina's men's golf program is led by head coach Jim Garren who was hired on July 20, 2017. Historically, the program has performed well on the national level. The 2004–05 team broke onto the national scene by finishing the regular season ranked sixth in the NCAA's South region. Coastal would go on to finish eighth at the NCAA East Regional that season and moved on to the NCAA Championship where the team finished 20th.

The program has continued to build on its success in recent years. In 2005–06, the Chanticleers finished 16th at the NCAA Championships, and finished the 2006–07 season ranked seventh in the nation and finished fifth at the NCAA Championships. The 2007–08 team struggled with the loss of All-American Dustin Johnson, finishing 22nd in the NCAA East Regional. Johnson would finish his collegiate career as a three-time All-American, and has since moved onto the PGA Tour and won his first major championship in 2016, as well as the 2020 Masters.

=== Men's soccer ===
The Coastal Carolina men's soccer program is coached by Shaun Docking. The Chanticleers have reached the NCAA Tournament on seven occasions and are nine-time Big South Conference Tournament Champions and two-time Sun Belt Conference Tournament Champions. A number of the program's former players have moved on to play professionally such as Joseph Ngwenya, Kheli Dube, Mubarike Chisoni, Jordan Hughes, Tyler Hughes, Boyzzz Khumalo and Stu Riddle, among others.

The Chanticleers joined Conference USA for men's soccer in July 2021 following the demise of the Sun Belt men's soccer league. However, later conference realignment led to the reinstatement of SBC men's soccer for the 2022 season, and Coastal returned men's soccer to its full-time home.

== Facilities ==
In 2013, TD Bank gave CCU a $5 million gift. In September 2014, CCU officially renamed all its sports facilities "TD Sports Complex". It includes:

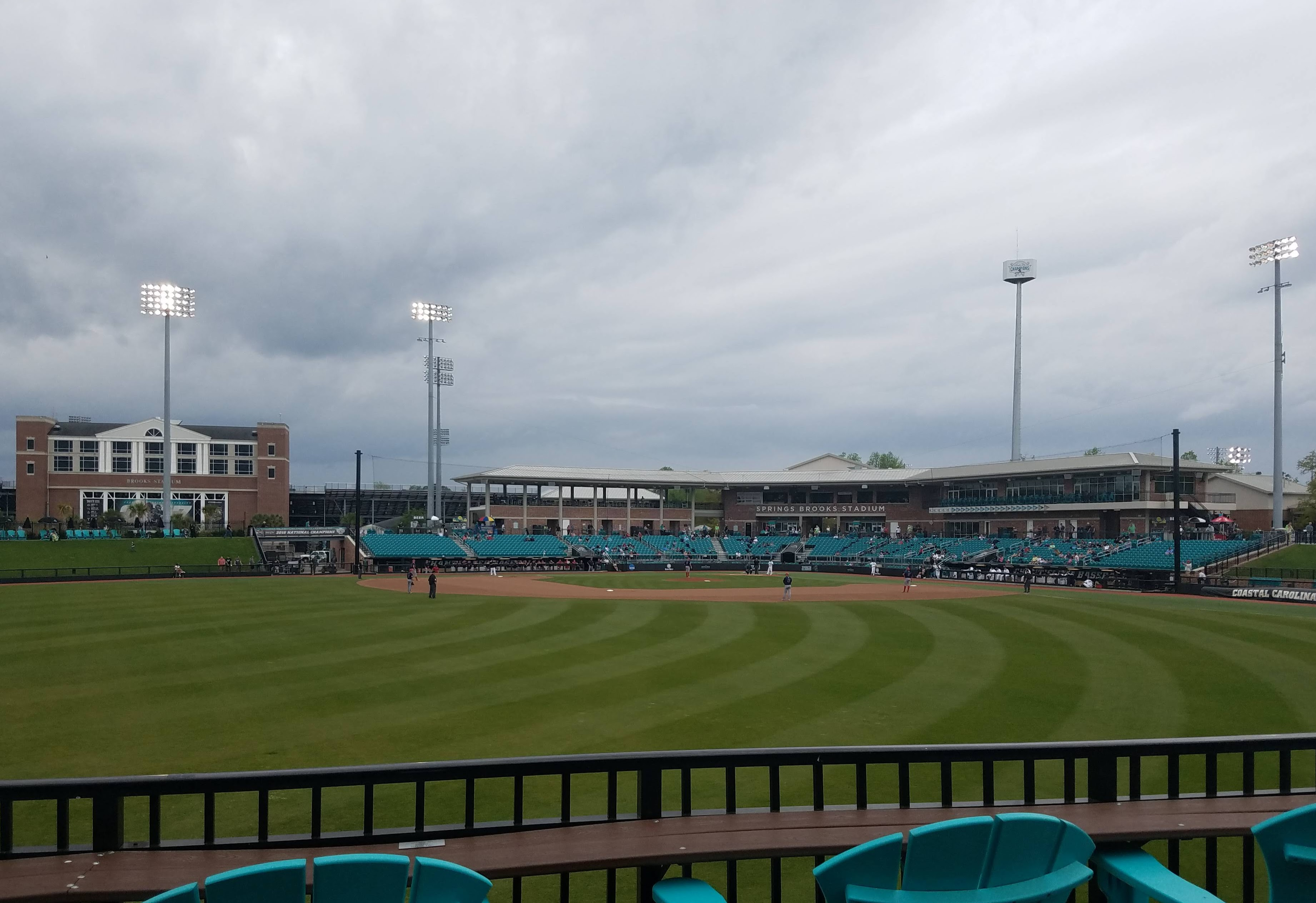
Spring Brooks

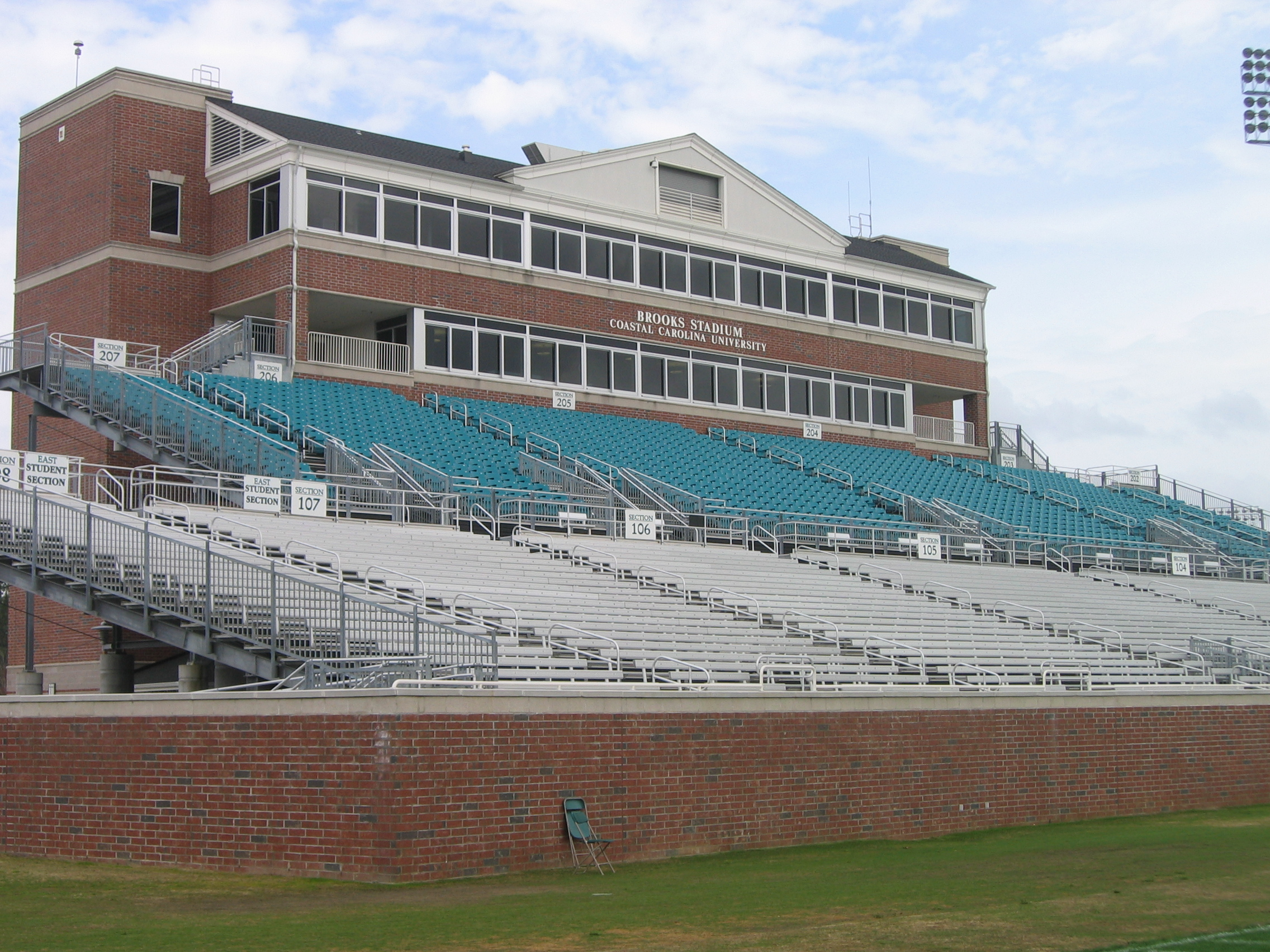
Brooks Stadium stand

Venue	Sport	Ref.
Brooks Stadium	Football	
Springs Brooks Stadium	Baseball	
HTC Center	Basketball	
HTC Center	Volleyball	
Quail Creek Golf Course	Golf	
Billy Nichols Tennis Center	Tennis	
CCU Soccer Complex	Soccer	
CCU Softball Field	Softball	
Track and Field Facility	Track and field	

=== Former facilities ===
Venue	Sport	Period	Ref.
CCU Soccer Field	Soccer	2003–2023	
Kimbel Arena	Basketball	1972–2012	
Kimbel Arena	Volleyball	1972–2012	
