= Vartkes Yeghiayan =

American lawyer

Vartkes Boghos Yeghiayan (Armenian: Վարդգէս Եղիայեան; April 6, 1936 - September 30, 2017) was an Armenian-American attorney specializing in international law. He was known for launching several lawsuits against insurance companies for insurance policies issued to Armenians in the early 20th century during the time of the Armenian genocide.

== Biography and career ==
Yeghiayan was born in Addis Ababa, Ethiopia to a wealthy Armenian family originally from the Ottoman Empire. His father Boghos, a native of Isparta, was an orphaned survivor of the World War I-era massacres and deportations of the Armenian genocide. In Ethiopia, Boghos had worked his way up at an international trading firm. Yeghiayan's mother, Aroussiag Terzian, had close relations with the Ethiopian royal family – her godmother was Menen Asfaw, the wife of Emperor Haile Selassie – and this relationship had afforded him and his two brothers the privilege to study abroad. At age eleven, he was sent to an American boarding school in Cyprus and in 1954 he arrived to study in the United States. He attended school at Indiana University for one year before being accepted to Berkeley, initially as a premed student, later changing his major and graduating with a Bachelor in history in 1959. Yeghiayan was accepted to the University of California, Hastings College of the Law and completed his legal studies at Lincoln Law School, receiving his Juris Doctor (J.D.) in 1965. After briefly working for a small firm in Oakland, he joined California Rural Legal Assistance (CRLA).

Over time, Yeghiayan rose from junior attorney to become the Northern California Regional Director of the CRLA. Due to his experience, in 1974 President Richard Nixon appointed him as the Special Assistant for International Operations to Director of ACTION. He was later appointed assistant director to the Peace Corps and remained in this position until 1980. Yeghiayan was made responsible for the establishment and management in formulating policy, agency planning, conducting liaison with foreign and domestic governmental and private organizations and individuals, and encouragement of voluntary service programs within the United States and abroad. As Assistant Director, he supervised the worldwide operations of the Peace Corps' 7,000 volunteers in over 60 countries. He was re-appointed by successive administrations and served under Presidents Nixon, Ford and Carter. Yeghiayan also served as Secretary for the United States Presidential Commission on Volunteerism.

In 1975, Yeghiayan testified before the United States Congress Helsinki Commission and in 1979, he was commissioned by the American Enterprise Institute of Public Policy, to write a position paper on the Horn of Africa, leading Yeghiayan to serve as consultant on the topic of starvation in Africa. Following his career in Washington D.C., Yeghiayan opened his own legal practice in California. In 1991, during the collapse of the Soviet Union, he visited the newly formed Republic of Armenia and served as a legal advisor there and authored the first draft of the Armenian Constitution. During the same year, Yeghiayan pioneered efforts to bring food assistance to the newly formed republic through USAID, and he led a team of engineers from the Ministry of Engineering in California to conduct a feasibility study of the oil industry in Armenia.

In 1989, Yeghiayan’s spouse, Rita Mahdessian, was admitted to the practice of law in California. The two formed a law firm, Yeghiayan & Associates, in Glendale, California.

The partners were charged with misappropriating $385,000 intended for Armenian genocide survivors and related charitable organizations, and faced disbarment proceedings. The partners were also sued, in 2011, by their co-counsel, Brian S. Kabateck and Mark Geragos, for misappropriation of funds; in turn, Yeghiayan counter-sued Kabateck and Geragos, filing similar charges. The matter was later submitted for arbitration. A year after Yeghiayan's death; in November 2018, Mahdessian was absolved of embezzling funds, but found to have "committed acts of moral turpitude by both (1) misappropriating $30,000 from the nonprofit, and (2) engaging in tax fraud by falsely reporting this and another $26,000 in taxable payouts to her children and their law school as donations or loan repayments... Considering Mahdessian’s three prior disciplinary suspensions, the hearing judge recommended disbarment." Though suspended from September 2017 to June 2018; Mahdessian was able to retain her license to practice law.

A 2022 investigate report by the Los Angeles Times wrote that upon discovery of the irregularities in the distribution of the AXA funds Yeghiayan "filed an emergency motion asking the judge to order an independent audit of the settlement." Along with the French board nominally responsible for overseeing the distribution process, Yeghiayan's office "started working together to unravel where the money went in the AXA settlement," uncovering checks written out to fraudulent claimants by settlement administrator Parsegh Kartalian in the sum of hundreds of thousands of dollars. Some of these checks were written out to Kartalian's own relatives, including his wife and mother-in-law, and more than $300,000 to a Berj Boyajian, a Beverly Hills lawyer. About $700,000 was eventually returned to the fund. According to the Times report, Yeghiayan subsequently wrote an e-mail to his attorney, “A crime has been committed. Now are we hoping to make a deal that would cover up the theft?” The judge presiding over the case ultimately refused to refer the alleged misappropriation of the funds to federal authorities.

== Activity in the Armenian community ==
Though as a youth Yeghiayan did not show too great an interest in the Armenian Genocide, the 1965 Yerevan demonstrations and the discovery of his father's harrowing experience through the massacres played a critical role in encouraging him to bring more public awareness to the subject.

In 1960, he founded the Armenian Students Association at the University of California, Berkeley, and in 1972, Yeghiayan initiated the first protest at the Turkish Consulate in Los Angeles, paving the way for what has now become an annual protest against the Turkish government for its continued denial of the genocide. Yeghiayan also edited and published several books dealing with issues regarding the Armenian Genocide.

== Class action lawsuits ==
In 1987, Yeghiayan came across a passage in the memoirs of Henry Morgenthau Sr., the American Ambassador to the Ottoman Empire from 1913 to 1916, describing an exchange between him and Mehmed Talat Pasha, the man chiefly held responsible for the Armenian Genocide. The text in question spoke of Talat's and, by extension, the state's interest in claiming as beneficiaries the life insurance policies of the Armenians who had perished during the genocide. The Armenians had purchased these policies from New York Life and Equitable Life of New York prior to the beginning of the war and, after exploring the issue more in depth, Yeghiayan came to the conclusion that New York Life, as well as other insurance companies, had withheld death benefits totaling in the tens of millions from the descendants of the deceased.

After gathering evidence and finding several descendants of the victims, in 1999 he filed a class action lawsuit against New York Life in a case which lasted for four years. In January 2004, New York Life agreed to pay $20 million to settle the lawsuit. The California state insurance commissioner appointed a committee of prominent Los Angeles Armenians to vet applications for settlement money, with the committee ultimately approving claims from the descendants of 2,400 Armenian Genocide victims. The settlement also included $3 million earmarked for nine Armenian church and charity groups. In 2015, Yeghiayan donated over 40 boxes of documents from the New York Life Insurance Company class action lawsuit to the USC Shoah Foundation Center for Advanced Genocide Research.

Yeghiayan also filed additional suits against other insurance companies, including AXA (with co-counsel Brian Kabateck and Mark Geragos), which agreed to settle in 2005 by paying $17.5 million, and Deutsche Bank. He has given lectures in the United States, Europe, the Middle East, Canada, and Armenia on the legal ramifications of the class lawsuits regarding the Armenian Genocide and restitution of Armenian properties.

In September 2008, Yeghiayan filed suit against the National Archives and Records Administration of the United States, seeking documents from 1914 to 1925 relating to the Armenian Genocide, following the administrations failed response to his repeated request to procure information. In June 2010, Yeghiayan filed on behalf of the Western Prelacy of the Armenian Church suit against the J. Paul Getty Museum for the return of eight thirteenth-century Armenian illuminated manuscript folios, the work of Armenian manuscript illuminator Toros Roslin, the first such case in the United States that the return of cultural or religious objects stolen during the Armenian Genocide. In September 2015 both parties reached an agreement whereby legal title of the folios would be returned to the Church while the pages themselves would remain in the possession of the Getty.

In December 2010, a suit was filed against the Turkish government and two Turkish banks, the Central Bank of the Republic of Turkey and Ziraat Bankası, for seized Armenian assets in the region of Adana. In March 2011, Yeghiayan filed suit against the United States Federal Reserve on behalf of the Center for Armenian Remembrance, to demand the disclosure of information pertaining to Armenian assets and confiscated gold, which was seized by the Ottomans during the Armenian Genocide.

== Awards and honors ==
- Lifetime Achievement Award, Armenian Bar Association (2011)
- Ellis Island Medal of Honor, National Ethnic Coalition of Organizations (2010)
- Order of St. Gregory the Great, Vatican ("Ordinis Santi Gregori Magni") (2009)
- Achievement Award, Federation of Eastern Greeks (2009)
- Lifetime Achievement Award, Armenian Educational Foundation (2008 )
- Attorney of the Year Award, CLAY – California Lawyer's Magazine (2006)
- Trial Lawyer of the Year Finalist, Consumer Attorneys of California (2005)
- Top Foreign Service Award, United States Government (1978)

== Publications ==
- Pro Armenia: Jewish Responses to the Armenian Genocide. Glendale, CA: Centre for Armenian Remembrance, 2012.
- Raphael Lemkin's Dossier on the Armenian Genocide. 2008 (in English, Turkish & Greek).
- British Reports on Ethnic Cleansing in Anatolia, 1919–1922: The Armenian-Greek Section Glendale, CA: Centre for Armenian Remembrance, 2008
- Vahan Cardashian: Advocate Extraordinaire of the Armenian Cause. Glendale, CA: Centre for Armenian Remembrance, 2007.
- The Case of Misak Torlakian. Glendale, CA: Centre for Armenian Remembrance, 2006.
- The Case of Soghomon Tehlirian. Glendale, CA: Centre for Armenian Remembrance, 2006.
- British Foreign Office Dossiers on Turkish War Criminals. La Verne, CA: American Armenian International College, 1991; Turkish translation, Malta Belgeleri: İngiltere Dışişleri Bakanlığı "Türk savaş suçluları" dosyası. Istanbul: Belge Yayınları, 2007.
- (in Armenian) They Refused to Die: A Chronicle of the Armenian Genocide. 1991.
- Trial of the Young Turks in Constantinople. 1990
- "The Horn of Africa: Challenges to American Foreign Policy," 1978.
- "Volunteerism: The Real and Emerging Power," 1976.
- Handbook on the Republic of Turkey. Los Angeles: ANC of California, 1974.
- "The Economic Commission and Associated States of Africa," 1966.
