= Steve Watson (athletic director) =

Current position
- Title: Athletic director
- Team: Loyola–Chicago
- Conference: Atlantic 10 Conference

Biographical details
- Education: Bowling Green State University, Ohio University

Playing career
- 1986–1988: Rutgers
- 1988–1990: Bowling Green

Administrative career (AD unless noted)
- 2001–2006: Eastern Michigan (associate AD)
- 2006–2014: St. Bonaventure
- 2014–present: Loyola–Chicago

Stephen Patrick Watson (born April 16, 1968) is the current director of athletics for Loyola University Chicago. He previously served as athletic director at St. Bonaventure University from 2006 to 2014, and as an associate athletic director at Eastern Michigan University from 2001 to 2006. Watson attended college at Rutgers University and Bowling Green State University, where he played on both school's college basketball teams. Watson was named athletic director at Loyola University Chicago on November 12, 2014, and brought on his very close friend Kate Achter to be the new head women's basketball coach in 2016.

== See also ==
- List of NCAA Division I athletic directors
