= Shaney Fink =

American athletic director

- Born: August 31, 1972 (age 53)
- Occupation: Athletic Director at Seattle University
- Spouse: Tom Vorkoper

Shaney Fink (born August 31, 1972) is the athletic director at Seattle University.

== College ==
Fink earned a B.A. in Social Science from University of California, Berkeley, where she also played on the volleyball team, was the Golden Bears’ captain in 1993, was named to the All-Pac-10 Decade Team (1990s), and finished her college career as a top-ten career leader in kills, assists, and digs. She later competed professionally in beach and indoor volleyball.

She also earned a master's degree in Counseling from the University of San Diego.

== Career ==
She competed in California Beach Volleyball Association competition in 1995–96, and won the Bud Light and Shady Business tournaments. Shaney competed on the Women's Professional Beach Volleyball tour in 1996–97.

She was a U.S. Maccabiah Games Team member in 1989, 1993, and 1997, winning gold medals in both beach and indoor volleyball in 1997, and a bronze in 1989, and was captain of the ’93 and ’97 teams. She played for Israel's professional Kiriat Haim team in 1997 for one year, as it won the Israeli Pro Indoor League and Israeli Cup Championships, and played for both Israeli National indoor and beach volleyball teams. During 1998, she was Israel's National Beach Tour champion, and represented Israel at the International Beach Volleyball competitions and European Championships.

Fink worked for over 17 years in the athletics department of the private Catholic University of San Diego. Her roles included compliance, student services, academic support, and as an assistant volleyball coach, and culminated in roles as Senior Associate Athletics Director and Senior Woman Administrator.

Fink was named director of athletics for Seattle University, effective November 1, 2016.

In 2008 she was inducted into the Southern California Jewish Sports Hall of Fame.

== Family ==
Shaney is married to Tom Vorkoper. The couple have three children, Lucas, Mia and Leon.

== See also ==
- List of NCAA Division I athletic directors
