= Desireé Reed-Francois =

American lawyer

Current position
- Title: Athletic director
- Team: Arizona
- Conference: Big 12

Biographical details
- Born: May 7, 1972 (age 54); Fremont, California, U.S.
- Education: University of California, Los Angeles; University of Arizona

Administrative career (AD unless noted)
- 1997–1998: California (compliance asst.)
- 1999–2002: San Jose State (compliance director)
- 2002–2003: Santa Clara (assoc. AD)
- 2003–2006: Fresno State (assoc. AD)
- 2007–2008: San Francisco (assoc. AD)
- 2008–2012: Tennessee (assoc. AD)
- 2013–2014: Cincinnati (senior assoc. AD, interim AD)
- 2014–2017: Virginia Tech (football)
- 2017–2021: UNLV
- 2021–2024: Missouri
- 2024–present: Arizona

Desireé Don Reed-Francois (born May 7, 1972) is an American attorney and college athletics administrator who became the athletic director at the University of Arizona on March 3, 2024. She has more than two-and-half decades of experience in intercollegiate athletics, including overseeing the external operations for several institutions.

A graduate of the University of California, Los Angeles and University of Arizona College of Law, Reed-Francois began her athletics administration career in 1997 as a compliance assistant at the University of California, Berkeley. She was later director of compliance at San Jose State from 1999 to 2002. For 15 years, Reed-Francois was an associate and deputy athletic director primarily on the sport administration and external relations areas from 2002 to 2003 at Santa Clara, then Fresno State from 2003 to 2006, San Francisco from 2007 to 2008, Tennessee from 2008 to 2012, Cincinnati from 2013 to 2014, and Virginia Tech from 2014 to 2017. At Tennessee, Reed-Francois was the direct supervisor for the men's basketball team; she had the same duties for Virginia Tech Hokies football.

From 2017 to 2021, Reed-Francois was athletic director at UNLV. She became the first Hispanic woman to be a full-time Football Bowl Subdivision athletic director. At UNLV, Reed-Francois led the athletic department through a period of increased fundraising. Her administration also presided over openings of a new practice facility and stadium for the football team.

== Early life and education ==
Born Desireé Don Reed to an Anglo American father and Mexican American mother, Reed-Francois grew up in Fremont, California. She graduated in 1994 from the University of California, Los Angeles, where she was a walk-on member of the rowing team for one year. She earned a Juris Doctor from the University of Arizona College of Law in 1997 and became a member of the California Bar. While attending law school, Reed-Francois worked for the Oakland Raiders in 1995, as a legal associate handling collective bargaining issues related to the team's relocation from Los Angeles.

== Career ==
=== Early career (1997–2002) ===
In the 1997–98 school year, Reed-Francois was an NCAA compliance assistant at the University of California, Berkeley. Reed-Francois worked as a litigation attorney in 1998 and 1999. Returning to athletics administration, Reed-Francois was director of compliance at San Jose State from 1999 to 2002.

=== Associate athletics director (2002–2017) ===
From 2002 to 2003, Reed-Francois was associate athletics director for compliance, student services, and legal affairs at Santa Clara. During that time, Reed-Francois also taught sports law courses at Lincoln Law School of San Jose.

In September 2003, Reed-Francois became associate athletics director for compliance and student services at Fresno State, at a time when Fresno State was under NCAA investigation. Reed-Francois later taught a sports law course at the Santa Clara University School of Law in the spring of 2004. In 2006, Reed-Francois left Fresno State to enter private legal practice. On October 1, 2007, the University of San Francisco hired Reed-Francois as associate athletics director for internal operations and senior women's administrator.

On August 27, 2008, Reed-Francois joined the University of Tennessee as associate athletics director for strategic projects and initiatives. In 2009, Tennessee promoted Reed-Francois to senior associate athletics director and senior administrator for the men's basketball program. Reed-Francois left Tennessee in 2012.

In March 2013, she was named Senior Associate Athletics Director and Senior Woman Administrator for the University of Cincinnati, later serving as interim athletic director. Reed-Francois joined Virginia Tech in May 2014, eventually overseeing the football program. At the time, she was one of four women with day-to-day oversight of a Power Five program.

=== UNLV (2017–2021) ===
Reed-Francois was announced as the UNLV athletic director in April 2017. She received a contract through 2022 with an annual salary of $350,000, which also included oversight of both Thomas & Mack Center and Sam Boyd Stadium. Reed-Francois became the first Hispanic woman to lead a Football Bowl Subdivision program as a full-time athletic director.

Reed-Francois organized a joint use agreement for UNLV Rebels football to share Allegiant Stadium with the future Las Vegas Raiders. The agreement was passed by the UNLV Board of Regents in an 11–1 vote on January 19, 2018.

UNLV made more facilities progress in football in 2019. Funded by Lorenzo and Frank Fertitta, the $34.8 million Fertitta Football Complex officially opened on the UNLV campus in October 2019. Later that year, Reed-Francois hired Marcus Arroyo as head coach of UNLV football after firing previous coach Tony Sanchez. In 2019, Reed-Francois fired Marvin Menzies and hired T. J. Otzelberger as UNLV Runnin' Rebels men's basketball coach. Under Otzelberger, UNLV men's basketball finished the 2019–20 season tied for second in the Mountain West Conference standings, the most successful conference finish since 2007.

By December 2020, UNLV raised $1 million for the Momentum Fund, a project meant to offset financial losses due to COVID-19 restricting ticket sales.

On April 30, 2021, UNLV signed Reed-Francois to a four-year contract extension through 2026 and a salary raise to $420,000. By this year, UNLV had raised over $60 million in donations and increased its donor base by 70 percent since Reed-Francois became athletics director.

=== Missouri (2021–2024) ===
On August 8, 2021, the University of Missouri hired Reed-Francois as athletics director. Reed-Francois became the first woman to be an athletics director at Missouri and any public school in the Southeastern Conference.

=== Arizona (2024–present) ===
On February 19, 2024, the University of Arizona hired Reed-Francois as athletics director.

== Family ==
Reed-Francois is married to Joshua Francois. They have one son named Jackson, who plays basketball at Arizona.

== See also ==
- List of NCAA Division I athletic directors
