= Steve Newmark =

American college sports administrator (born 1968)

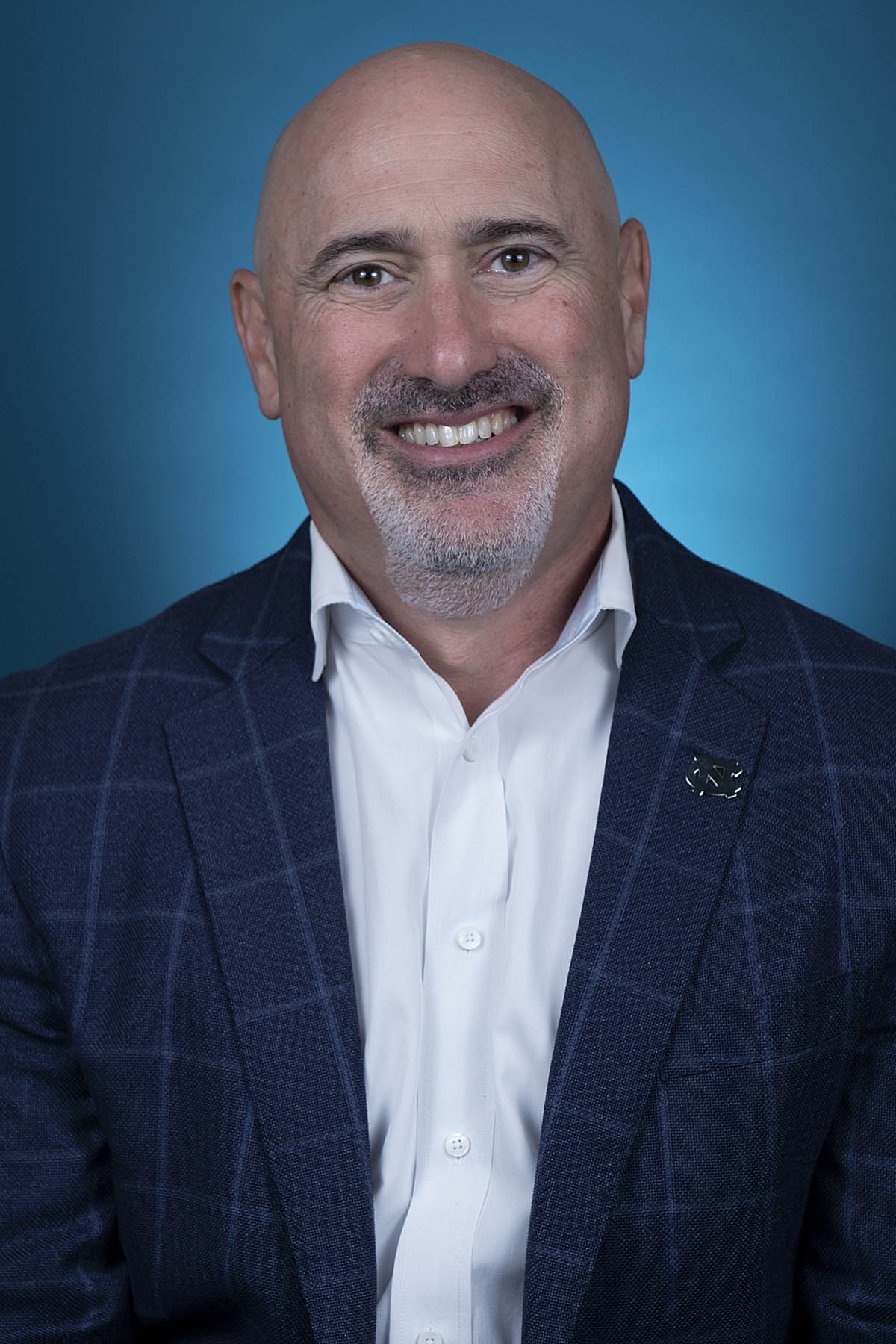

Current position
- Title: Director of Athletics
- Team: North Carolina
- Conference: ACC

Biographical details
- Born: July 1, 1971 (age 55); Chapel Hill, North Carolina, U.S.
- Education: College of William & Mary; University of Virginia

Administrative career (AD unless noted)
- 2010–2025: RFK Racing (President)
- 2025–2026: North Carolina (Executive Associate Athletic Director)
- 2026–present: North Carolina

Steve Newmark is an American sports executive based in Chapel Hill, North Carolina, best known for his fifteen years as president of Roush Fenway Keselowski Racing (RFK) in NASCAR and for his role as one of the chief architects of the sport's charter system."NASCAR charter a 'win-win'". Sports Business Journal. February 14, 2016.

On July 1, 2026, he was named the next Director of Athletics at the University of North Carolina at Chapel Hill, 11 months after joining the department as Executive Associate Athletic Director on August 15, 2025. Before his tenure in motorsports, Newmark practiced law in Charlotte, North Carolina, where he negotiated multimedia rights agreements for major collegiate conferences and NCAA properties.

== Early life and education ==
Newmark was born and raised in Chapel Hill, North Carolina, and has long ties to many current and former coaches and athletic department executives. "How a former NASCAR executive with deep Chapel Hill ties plans to move UNC athletics forward". WRAL.com. Capitol Broadcasting Company. August 31, 2025. He earned a Bachelor of Arts in history and psychology from the College of William & Mary, graduating magna cum laude and serving as a Frederick Taylor Scholar and President's Aide. He received his Juris Doctor from the University of Virginia School of Law, where he was a member of the Virginia Law Review, Virginia Tax Review, and Order of the Coif.

== Legal career ==
After law school, Newmark clerked for Judge W. Earl Britt of the United States District Court for the Eastern District of North Carolina and Judge Dickson Phillips of the United States Court of Appeals for the Fourth Circuit."Steve Newmark — LinkedIn profile". LinkedIn. He later joined Robinson Bradshaw in Charlotte, North Carolina,"Welcome New Board Members!". crisisassistance.org. Crisis Assistance Ministry. May 12, 2021. practicing in sports and entertainment, mergers and acquisitions, technology, and private equity.[citation needed] During his legal career, Newmark worked on multimedia rights agreements involving the NCAA men's basketball tournament, the Southeastern Conference, Conference USA, and various NASCAR teams, drivers, and sponsors. He was named to the Charlotte Business Journal's "40 Under 40" in 2008 and to Business North Carolina's "Legal Elite" in 2009.

== Roush Fenway Keselowski Racing ==
Newmark joined RFK Racing in April 2010 as senior vice president of business operations and was subsequently named president of the team in December 2010, a role he held until August 2025."RFK Racing president Newmark leaving organization". RACER. July 1, 2025. During his tenure, RFK operated multiple teams, employed, at its peak, 400 personnel and held a joint ownership stake in Roush-Yates Engines, which serves as the exclusive Ford engine builder for NASCAR."RFK Racing". Wikipedia. Newmark oversaw the team's commercial operations and the modernization of the organization's marketing infrastructure."Bill Belichick Getting New Boss And He's Coming From NASCAR". Fox Sports. July 2, 2025. He also directed sustainability initiatives that made RFK the first NASCAR organization to achieve carbon-neutral status under the PAS 2060 standard, independently certified by ERM Certification and Verification Services for the 2020 and 2021 seasons."Carbon Neutrality Qualifying Explanatory Statement" (PDF). rfkracing.com. Roush Fenway Keselowski Racing. March 11, 2022.

== Race Team Alliance and NASCAR Governance ==
Newmark was a founding contributor to the Race Team Alliance (RTA) when it was established in July 2014."9 Top NASCAR Team Owners Form Race Team Alliance". PerformanceRacing.com. Performance Racing Industry. July 7, 2014. The RTA is a 501(c)(6) organization formed to give Cup Series teams a unified voice in negotiations with NASCAR, primarily on matters of cost reduction, revenue distribution, and competitive rules. A central accomplishment of the RTA was the development of the NASCAR Charter System, announced in February 2016. Newmark was described as one of the chief architects of the deal, with Sports Business Journal reporting that he led the initial effort to align the teams philosophically before negotiations with NASCAR began. He was a member of the Team Negotiating Committee for subsequent charter and media rights discussions from 2022 to 2024, which addressed revenue distribution from NASCAR's television rights agreements with major broadcast partners."An Explainer On NASCAR Charters, The RTA". USANetwork.com. October 13, 2022. He also served as co-chair of the Team Owner Council from 2018 to 2019[citation needed] and worked with NASCAR leadership, drivers, broadcasters, and track operators on updates to the NASCAR Cup Series racing format.

== University of North Carolina ==
In June 2025, UNC Chancellor Lee H. Roberts and Athletic Director Bubba Cunningham announced Newmark as Cunningham's designated successor. Newmark joined the department on August 15, 2025, as executive associate athletic director, reporting to Cunningham and focusing on revenue-generating strategies related to football and men's and women's basketball programs. He is set to officially assume the role of director of athletics in summer 2026, as Cunningham transitions to a new position as senior adviser to the chancellor. UNC's athletic department fields 28 varsity sports programs serving more than 700 student-athletes."UNC's 28-Sport Program". GoHeels.com. University of North Carolina Athletics. August 2, 2024. Prior to assuming the athletic director role, Newmark served on the advisory committee involved in the hiring of head football coach Bill Belichick at UNC.

== Community Involvement ==
Beyond his professional roles, Newmark has been active in nonprofit and civic life in Charlotte, North Carolina. He served as board chair of Crisis Assistance Ministry in 2025,"Welcome New Board Members for 2025". crisisassistance.org. Crisis Assistance Ministry. February 20, 2025. board chair of the Carolina Raptor Center (2006–2007), and board chair of ArtsTeach (2009), and he was a member of the Arts & Sciences Council of Charlotte. He has also mentored students through the Greater Steps Scholars program, coached youth basketball, baseball, and soccer, and provided foster care for animals through the Animal Adoption League.

== Personal life ==
After living in Charlotte, North Carolina for more than 25 years, Newmark relocated to Chapel Hill in 2025. He has two sons.
