= Amy Folan =

American athletic director

Current position
- Title: Athletic director
- Team: Central Michigan
- Conference: MAC

Biographical details
- Education: University of Connecticut, University of Georgia

Playing career
- 1992–1995: UConn

Administrative career (AD unless noted)
- 1997–1999: Georgia (assistant director for compliance)
- 1999–2002: NCAA (membership services representative)
- 2002–2020: Texas (associate AD)
- 2020–present: Central Michigan

Amy Folan is the current director of athletics for Central Michigan University. She previously served as associate athletic director for the University of Texas at Austin from 2002 to 2020. Folan previously held administrative positions at the University of Georgia and with the National Collegiate Athletic Association. Folan, a native of Portland, Maine, attended college at the University of Connecticut, where she played on the UConn Huskies women's soccer team as a defender. Folan was named athletic director at Central Michigan University on September 22, 2020.
