= Rachelle Paul =

Current position
- Title: Deputy athletic director / Senior women's administrator
- Team: Miami
- Conference: ACC

Biographical details
- Born: June 16, 1981 (age 45)
- Education: Canisius College

Playing career
- 2000–2003: Canisius lacrosse
- 2002: Canisius soccer

Administrative career (AD unless noted)
- 2004–2005: MAAC (compliance fellow)
- 2005–2008: NEC (assistant commissioner for compliance)
- 2008–2012: Canisius (director of compliance)
- 2012–2015: Monmouth (senior associate AD)
- 2015–2019: Seton Hall (senior associate AD)
- 2019–2023: Saint Peter's
- 2023–present: Miami (deputy AD/SWA)

Rachelle Paul (née Held; born June 16, 1981) is an American college athletics administrator. She currently serves as deputy athletic director and senior woman administrator at the University of Miami. She previously served as director of athletics at Saint Peter's University from 2019 to 2023, as a senior associate athletic director at Seton Hall University from 2015 to 2019, and as a senior associate athletic director at Monmouth University from 2012 to 2015. Paul previously held administrative positions at Canisius College, the Northeast Conference, and the Metro Atlantic Athletic Conference. Paul attended college at Canisius College, where she played on the school's women's lacrosse team from 2000 to 2003. She also played on the soccer team as a defender in 2002, making eleven appearances. Paul was named athletic director at Saint Peter's University on October 30, 2019. She resigned from Saint Peter's on August 9, 2023, to accept a position as deputy athletic director and senior woman administrator at the University of Miami.
