= Brady Barke =

University athletic director

Current position
- Title: Athletic director
- Team: Southeast Missouri State
- Conference: OVC

Biographical details
- Born: HOME
- Education: Webster University, Southeast Missouri State University, Southern Illinois University

Playing career
- 2001–2004: Webster
- Position: Basketball / golf

Administrative career (AD unless noted)
- 2008–2011: Southeast Missouri State (assistant AD)
- 2011–2013: Southeast Missouri State (associate AD)
- 2015–2016: Southeast Missouri State (interim AD)
- 2016–present: Southeast Missouri State

Brady Barke is the current director of athletics for Southeast Missouri State University. He previously served as an associate athletic director for Southeast Missouri State. Barke attended college at Southeast Missouri State University, Southern Illinois University, and Webster University. At Webster, Barke played on the school's basketball and golf teams. Barke was named interim athletic director at Southeast Missouri State on August 2, 2015, before being named permanent athletic director on June 8, 2016.
