= Chance Miller =

American college sports administrator

Current position
- Title: Athletic director
- Team: Coastal Carolina
- Conference: Sun Belt Conference

Biographical details
- Born: Gray, Tennessee, U.S.
- Education: University of Tennessee; New York Law School J.D.

Administrative career (AD unless noted)
- 2009–2013: NCAA (associate director on enforcement staff)
- 2013–2019: South Carolina (office of compliance)
- 2019–2024: South Carolina (senior deputy athletics director)
- 2024–present: Coastal Carolina

Chance Miller is an American university sports administrator who is athletic director at the Coastal Carolina University, and was previously for the deputy athletic director at the University of South Carolina.

== Early life ==
He grew up outside of Johnson City, Tennessee and attended the University of Tennessee. He would later get his Juris Doctor from New York Law School. After graduation law school, Chance would begin working for New York City Law Department representing multiple agencies for New York City. After working for the City of New York, he would become a legal intern for the NFL before going to work for the NCAA.

== South Carolina ==
Chance arrived in Columbia, SC in 2013 after 4 years of working in the NCAA's office of compliance. He would work in a similar role at South Carolina. In 2019 Chance was promoted to Senior Deputy Athletics Director. He played a major role in the hirings of Shane Beamer and Lamont Paris. He also served as the point man in the negiotations to bring Liverpool and Manchester United to Williams–Brice Stadium the first major soccer contest to be played in the stadium August 3, 2024.

== Coastal Carolina ==
Chance was named vice president for Intercollegiate Athletics and University Recreation (AD) on June 13, 2024. He begins his new role with Coastal Carolina on July 16.
