= George Schaefer (baseball) =

American baseball player and coach

Biographical details
- Born: November 23, 1989 (age 35); Norfolk, Virginia

Playing career
- 2009–2013: Charleston Southern
- Position(s): Pitcher

Coaching career (HC unless noted)
- 2015–2016: Iona (P)
- 2017–2019: Charleston Southern (P)
- 2020: Charleston Southern (Interim HC)

Head coaching record
- Overall: 7–12
- Tournaments: 0–0 (Big South)

George E. Schaefer Jr. (born November 23, 1989) is an American baseball coach and former pitcher. He played college baseball at Charleston Southern for coach Stuart Lake from 2009 to 2013. He then served as the interim head coach of the Charleston Southern Buccaneers in 2020.

== Playing career ==
Schaefer attended Bishop Sullivan Catholic High School in Virginia Beach, Virginia. Schaefer played for the school's varsity basketball and baseball teams. He was named Bishop Sullivan's Pitcher of the Year as a junior and senior, as well as being named team MVP as a senior. He pitched to a career 12–7 record and a 2.91 ERA. Schaefer then enrolled at the Charleston Southern University, to play college baseball for the Charleston Southern Buccaneers baseball team.

== Coaching career ==
Schaefer worked as the director of baseball operations for the Lehigh Mountain Hawks baseball program in 2014 while working on his master's degree. In the fall of 2014, he was hired to become the pitching coach at Iona College.

On December 31, 2019, Buccaneer's head coach Adam Ward stepped down and Schaefer was named the interim head coach for the 2020 season.

== Head coaching record ==
Statistics overview
Season	Team	Overall	Conference	Standing	Postseason
Charleston Southern Buccaneers (Big South Conference) (2020)
2020	Charleston Southern	7–12	0–0		Season canceled due to COVID-19
Charleston Southern:		7–12	0–0		
Total:		7–12			
