= Jeff Barber (athletic director) =

American college athletics administrator

Current position
- Title: Athletic director
- Team: Charleston Southern
- Conference: Big South

Biographical details
- Born: January 12, 1958 (age 68); Greenville, North Carolina, U.S.
- Education: East Carolina University

Administrative career (AD unless noted)
- 1985–1986: Columbia Mets (assistant GM)
- 1986–1987: Montreal Expos (director of operations)
- 1987–1991: East Carolina (assistant AD)
- 1991–1996: Furman (associate AD)
- 1996–2006: South Carolina (associate AD)
- 2006–2016: Liberty
- 2018–present: Charleston Southern

Jeff Barber (born January 12, 1958) is an American college athletics administrator, serving that role at Charleston Southern University since 2018.

== Career ==
He was previously the athletic director at Liberty University from 2006 to 2016. During his tenure at Liberty, Barber oversaw extensive growth in the Flames' athletic program, including the building of new venues for the school's baseball and softball programs. He also made the decision to eliminate Liberty's wrestling program in 2011, in order to bring the university in compliance with federal Title IX regulations. However, after several years of attempts, he was unable to secure Liberty an invitation to move up to a Football Bowl Subdivision conference, after several years of school president Jerry Falwell Jr. publicly stating Liberty's wish to reclassify. Barber resigned from his position at Liberty on November 17, 2016.

Before his time at Liberty, Barber was an assistant athletic director at East Carolina University from 1987 to 1991, an associate athletic director at Furman University from 1991 to 1996, and an associate athletic director at the University of South Carolina from 1996 to 2006. He graduated from East Carolina University with a bachelor's degree in 1981.

He was named athletic director at Charleston Southern University on May 17, 2018.
