= Lincoln Law School of San Jose =

Law school in San Jose, California, United States

- Established: 1919, 107 years ago
- School type: Private law school
- Dean: Mary A. Fuller
- Location: San Jose, California, US; 37°19′52″N 121°53′06″W
- Enrollment: 27 (2024)
- Faculty: 1 (full-time), 27 (part-time)
- USNWR ranking: Not ranked
- Bar pass rate: 53.1% (passage rate over a five year period)
- Website: lincolnlawschool.edu

Lincoln Law School of San Jose is a small private law school located in San Jose, California. Founded in 1919, the law school was absorbed by Lincoln University in 1926, prior to separating in 1993. The school is approved by the California Committee of Bar Examiners, but is not accredited by the American Bar Association so graduates may not be able to take the bar examination of other states after graduation.

== History ==
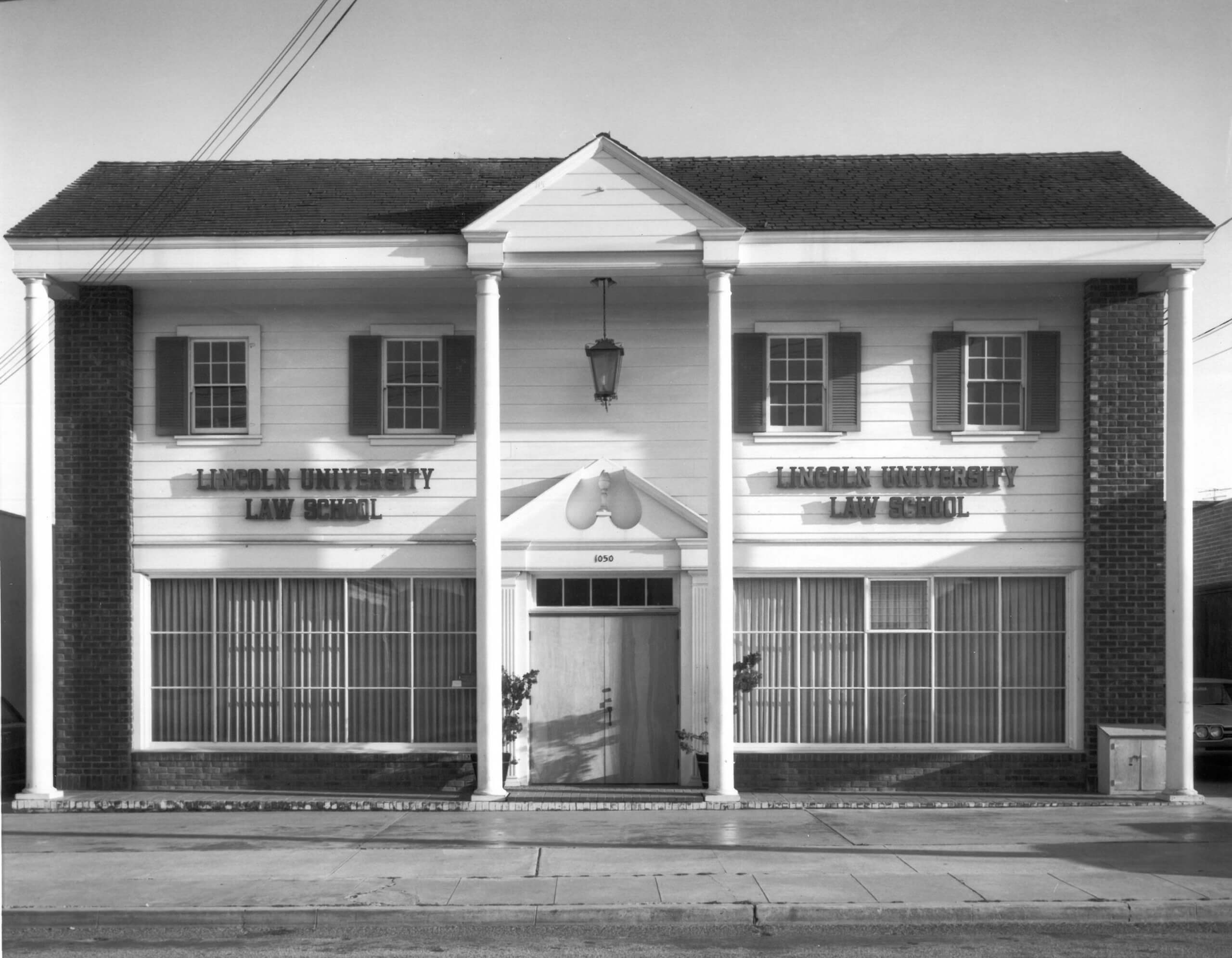
Lincoln University Law School building in the 1960s

The school traces its roots to 1919 when Benjamin Lickey and his wife Susan Lickey founded a law study program in San Francisco as a way to provide veterans and working-class students a part-time night school for law studies.

The school was incorporated in 1926 as a part of Lincoln University and located in San Francisco. In 1961, a second law school campus was opened in San Jose, graduating its first class in 1965. By 1987, Lincoln University's entire law school program was concentrated in San Jose. In 1993, the San Jose campus formally separated from Lincoln University becoming independent and changing its name to Lincoln Law School of San Jose. The school moved to downtown San Jose in 1999. In 2000, the 25-year-old Peninsula University School of Law merged into Lincoln Law School of San Jose.

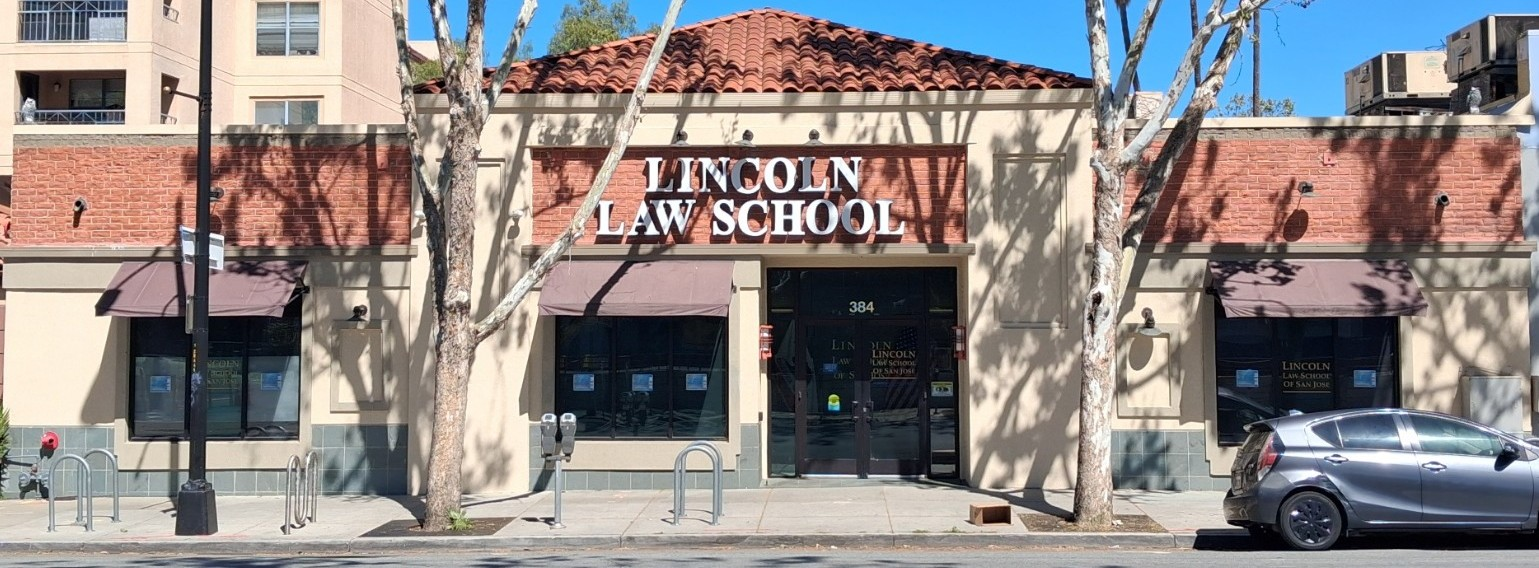
Lincoln Law School of San Jose building in 2026

From 1965 to 2013 Lincoln published a student-produced law review.

Lincoln Law School moved locations several times throughout its history. From 1962-1967, it operated at The Alameda. In 1968, it moved into a building on Park Avenue. On September 30th, 2015, the school relocated from the intersection of First Street and Santa Clara Street, where it had operated since 1972, moving to its current location at 384 South Second Street.

In February 2025, California state senator David Cortese, a Lincoln alumnus and assembly member, and Ash Kalra, a former Lincoln adjunct professor, sponsored legislation that would allow Lincoln Law School to partner with San Jose State University to jointly award law degrees.

== Academics ==
Lincoln is exclusively an evening-study program that lasts 4 or 4.5 years, depending upon the starting date of the student. 84 units of study are required for graduation with each unit equal to 15 hours of in-class instruction. Students usually attend classes 3 or 4 nights a week, with a few options for elective or seminar classes scheduled during the daytime on Saturdays.

=== Accreditation ===
Lincoln Law School of San Jose is accredited by the State Bar of California through its Committee of Bar Examiners. It is not accredited by the American Bar Association so graduates may not be able to take the bar examination of other states after graduation.

From 1993 through 2022, the school was accredited by the Committee of Bar Examiners of the State Bar of California. On July 1, 2022, the school reported that due to difficulties stemming from the COVID-19 pandemic it did not meet the State Bar of California five-year bar passage rate of 40 percent for state-approved law schools. As a result, the school's accreditation was terminated on December 31, 2022. The law school became a registered, unaccredited, fixed-facility law school effective January 1, 2023.

On March 14, 2025, the Committee of Bar Examiners unanimously approved that Lincoln be reaccredited by the State Bar of California.

=== Admissions and attrition ===
As reported by the school in January 2025, the school accepted 12 of 45 applicants (26.6%), with 4 (33.3%) of those accepted enrolling. The median enrollee had a 2.9 undergraduate GPA. More than 77% of the student body identifies as Black, Indigenous, or Persons of Color (BIPOC). The school does not utilize the Law School Admissions Test (LSAT) for admissions, but it collects the data when available, which resulted in a 141 average LSAT score. From 2021 through September 2024, 15 students transferred out of the school and 72 other students did not remain enrolled.

== Employment ==
By 2022, six out of twelve 2019 graduates reported employment, as follows: one reported employment where a JD degree was required (i.e. as an attorney), two reported employment where a JD degree was an advantage, and three (50%) were unemployed.

== Tuition and fees ==
The total estimated tuition for attendance at the school through graduation was $84,000 plus estimated fees of $4,500 for a total of $88,500.

== Notable people ==
Alumni

- David D. Cortese, JD 1995 — Current California state senator and former member Santa Clara County Board of Supervisors
- Linda J. LeZotte, JD 1980 from Lincoln University — Former San Jose city council member
- Vartkes Yeghiayan (1936-2017), JD 1965 from Lincoln University — Former lawyer and legal activist for the victims of the Armenian genocide charged with misappropriating money intended for genocide survivors

Dean, instructors, and board members

- Rod Diridon Sr. — Former chairman of the school's board; former chair of the California High-Speed Rail Authority
- Maya Harris — Former dean; sister of Kamala Harris, and former chair of the Kamala Harris 2020 presidential campaign
- Ash Kalra — Former adjunct professor; current California State Assembly member and former San Jose City Council member
- Desiree Reed-Francois — Former professor of sports law (2002-2003); current athletic director of the University of Arizona
- William James Ware — Former adjunct professor; retired reprimanded judge of the U.S. District Court for the Northern District of California; also taught at Santa Clara University School of Law
