= Southeast Missouri State Redhawks =

Collegiate sports club in the USA

- University: Southeast Missouri State University
- Nickname: Redhawks
- NCAA: Division I (FCS)
- Conference: Ohio Valley Conference (primary); Midwest Independent (women's gymnastics)
- Athletic director: Brady Barke
- Location: Cape Girardeau, Missouri
- Varsity teams: 15
- Football stadium: Houck Stadium
- Basketball arena: Show Me Center
- Baseball stadium: Capaha Field
- Softball stadium: Southeast Softball Comnplex
- Soccer stadium: Houck Stadium
- Other venues: Abe Stuber Track Complex; Houck Field House; Redhawks Tennis Complex
- Colors: Red and black
- Mascot: Rowdy the Redhawk
- Website: semoredhawks.com

The Southeast Missouri State Redhawks are the athletic teams of Southeast Missouri State University (SEMO), located in Cape Girardeau, Missouri, United States. The Redhawks athletic program is a member of the Ohio Valley Conference (OVC) and competes at the NCAA Division I level including the Football Championship Subdivision. The SEMO mascot is Rowdy the Redhawk and the school colors are red and black.

== Sports sponsored ==
Men's sports	Women's sports
Baseball	Basketball
Basketball	Cross Country
Cross Country	Gymnastics
Football	Soccer
Track and field^{1}	Softball
	Tennis
	Track and field^{1}
	Volleyball
^{1} – includes both indoor and outdoor

Southeast Missouri State was a charter member of the Division II athletic conference Mid-America Intercollegiate Athletics Association (MIAA) from 1912 until moving to Division I and joining the OVC in 1991. Before January 2005, the athletic team nicknames were the "Indians" (men's teams) and "Otahkians" (women's teams), and the University's mascot was known as Chief Sagamore, represented by a student dressed in Native American regalia. Chief Sagamore was retired as mascot in the mid-1980s due to a growing cultural sensitivity to Native American mascots, but the team names lasted for nearly 20 more years. After a movement by Student Government, the Booster Club and the National Alumni Council, those names were officially retired in a ceremony on October 22, 2004, and replaced with "Redhawks."

A member of the Ohio Valley Conference, Southeast Missouri State University sponsors six men's and nine women's teams in NCAA sanctioned sports:

== National championships ==
The Redhawks have won one team NCAA national championship, at the Division II level.

=== Team ===
Sport	Association	Division	Year	Opponent/Runner-up	Score
Men's cross country (1)	NCAA	Division II	1984	Edinboro	87–129 (-42)

== Individual teams ==
=== Basketball ===
The men's basketball team won a share of the regular season OVC title in 2000, and won the conference's tournament as well that year to earn an automatic bid to the 2000 NCAA Tournament. In the team's first appearance in "The Big Dance", the Redhawks were seeded #13 in the West Region and set to face off against Louisiana State University in the opening round of the tournament. In an exciting game, 4th-seeded LSU Tigers narrowly escaped the upset as they held off the Indians 64–61. The current head coach, as of the 2020-21 season, is Brad Korn.

On March 4, 2023, the RedHawks held off Tennessee Tech 89-82 in OT where they won the OVC’s automatic bid to “The Big Dance”, going there for just the second time in program history.

=== Football ===
The football team has also had its struggles since moving up to Division I-AA (now Division I FCS) in 1991, having only 3 winning seasons during its first 26 years in the OVC. The football program had some redemption during the 2002 season as the team made it into the I-AA polls for the first time, finishing the season ranked #23 in the ESPN/USA Today I-AA poll and #24 in the Sports Network I-AA poll. That season also produced the school's only win over a I-A opponent since moving to I-AA, as the Redhawks topped Middle Tennessee 24–14 in Murfreesboro, Tennessee. They would go on to win the Ohio Valley Conference title in 2010, making their first playoff appearance the same year. After 4 years under Coach Tom Matukewicz, SEMO finally broke free from their drought of losing seasons, having records of 8-3 in 2018, 9-3 in 2019, 9-3 in 2022, and 9-4 in 2024. The team made a handful of I-AA polls including finishing #15 in 2018, #17 in 2019, #15 in 2022, and #16 in 2024 (peaking at #6, the highest rank in their FCS history). The Redhawks have added 2 co-conference championships, once in 2022, being tied with the UT-Martin Skyhawks at 5-0 for the Ohio Valley Conference, and again in 2024, with a 4-way jam between the Tennessee Tech Golden Eagles, the UT-Martin Skyhawks, and the Tennessee State Tigers, for the recently merged Big South-OVC title. SEMO has taken part in the FCS playoffs five separate times, with a record of 1-5, the only win being a 28-14 win over Stony Brook. The football program has seen quite a few NFL draft picks in recent years, including Cowboys WR Ryan Flournoy (Rd 6, Pick 216), OT Drew Forbes (Rd 6, Pick 189), and DE Kendall Donnerson (Rd 7, Pick 248). SEMO has also seen some undrafted talent make the league in the past decade, including Mike Ford Jr. (DB), Al Young (DB), and Kristian Wilkerson (WR). SEMO is also where legendary New England Patriots Offensive Lineman Dan Connolly played in college. Connolly is well known for his 71-yard kickoff return against the Green Bay Packers, the longest by an offensive lineman in NFL history. Connolly is second in NFL games started for the Redhawks with 71 starts, behind Ken Iman’s 144 games started who graduated all the way back in 1960.
