= Charleston Southern Buccaneers =

- University: Charleston Southern University
- Conference: Big South (primary)
- NCAA: Division I (FCS)
- Athletic director: Jeff Barber
- Location: North Charleston, South Carolina
- Varsity teams: 16 (7 men's, 9 women's)
- Football stadium: Buccaneer Field
- Basketball arena: Buccaneer Fieldhouse; North Charleston Coliseum
- Baseball stadium: Nielsen Field at CSU Ballpark
- Softball stadium: CSU Softball Complex
- Soccer stadium: CSU Soccer Field
- Tennis venue: Gary Clark Banks Sr. Tennis Center
- Mascot: Bucky the Buccaneer
- Nickname: Buccaneers
- Colors: Blue and gold
- Website: www.csusports.com
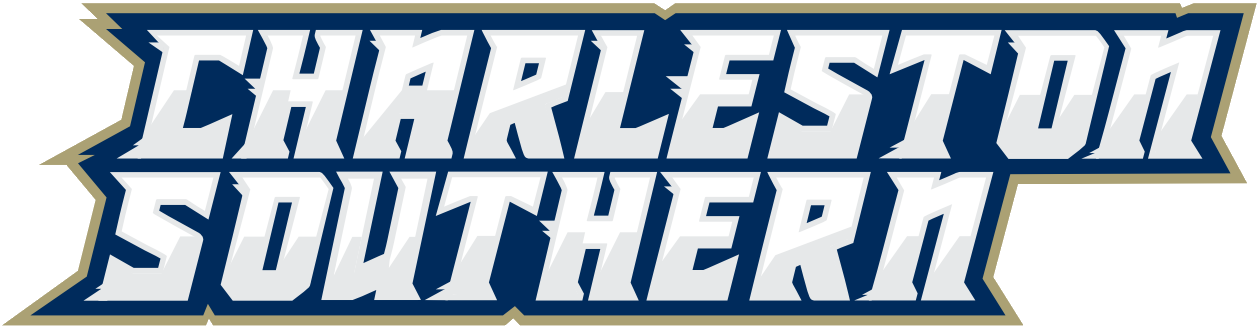

The Charleston Southern Buccaneers are the athletic teams that represent Charleston Southern University, located in North Charleston, South Carolina, in intercollegiate sports at the Division I ranks of the National Collegiate Athletic Association (NCAA), primarily competing in the Big South Conference since the 1983–84 academic year; while its football program competes in the FCS, formerly known as I-AA.

Charleston Southern competes in sixteen intercollegiate varsity sports. Men's sports include baseball, basketball, cross country, football, golf, and track and field (indoor and outdoor); while women's sports include basketball, cross country, golf, soccer, softball, tennis, track and field (indoor and outdoor), and volleyball. Women's flag football will be added in the 2027–28 school year. Other sports formerly offered by the Buccaneers include men's soccer and men's tennis.

== Conference affiliations ==
NCAA

- Big South Conference (1983–present)

== Varsity teams ==
CSU competes in the NCAA in the following sports:

Men's sports	Women's sports
Baseball	Basketball
Basketball	Cross country
Cross country	Flag football (2027–28)
Football	Golf
Golf	Soccer
Track and field^{†}	Softball
	Tennis
	Track and field^{†}
	Volleyball
† – Track and field includes both indoor and outdoor

In 2008, CSU closed its highly successful men's tennis program to reallocate funds to other sports. CSU formerly fielded a men's soccer team.

=== Cross Country ===
Beginning in 2020, Charleston Southern has won six consecutive Big South Conference titles in Men’s Cross Country. The Buccaneer men won the title in 2020, 2021, 2022, 2023, 2024, and 2025.

=== Football ===
==== Rivalry with Coastal Carolina ====
These two schools first met on the football field in 2003 and it has been a rivalry since Charleston Southern defeated Coastal Carolina 34–27 in 2005 to win a share of the Big South Championship that Coastal had already clinched. CSU got the first shutout of the series with their 24–0 win in 2008. Currently, Charleston Southern has a two-game winning streak over Coastal Carolina with Charleston Southern winning 59–58 in 2016. Charleston Southern won a share of the 2016 Big South Championship and got the automatic berth into the NCAA Playoffs.

Coastal Carolina leads the series 8–6.

- 2016 – CSU @ Coastal – W, 59–58
- 2015 – Coastal @ CSU – W, 33–25
- 2014 – CSU @ Coastal – L, 43–22
- 2013 – Coastal @ CSU – W, 31–26
- 2012 – CSU @ Coastal – L, 41–20
- 2011 – Coastal @ CSU – L, 45–38
- 2010 – CSU @ Coastal – L, 70–3
- 2009 – Coastal @ CSU – W, 30–23
- 2008 – CSU @ Coastal – W, 24–0
- 2007 – Coastal @ CSU – L, 41–2
- 2006 – CSU @ Coastal – L, 31–17
- 2005 – Coastal @ CSU – W, 34–27 (2 OT)
- 2004 – CSU @ Coastal – L, 56–28
- 2003 – Coastal @ CSU – L, 48–14 (First Meeting)

==== Charleston Southern vs FBS Schools ====
Charleston Southern is a member of the Big South Conference

Year	FBS Opponent	Result	Opponent's Conference	Opponent's Head Coach	Charleston Southern's Head Coach
2022	NC State	L, 3–55	ACC	Dave Doeren	Autry Denson
2021	Georgia	L, 7–56	SEC	Kirby Smart	Autry Denson
2021	East Carolina	L, 28–31	American	Mike Houston	Autry Denson
2019	South Carolina	L, 10–72	SEC	Will Muschamp	Autry Denson
2018	Florida	L, 6–53	SEC	Dan Mullen	Mark Tucker
2017	Indiana	L, 0–27	Big Ten	Tom Allen	Mark Tucker
2017	Mississippi State	L, 0–49	SEC	Dan Mullen	Mark Tucker
2016	Florida State	L, 8–52	ACC	Jimbo Fisher	Jamey Chadwell
2015	Alabama	L, 6–56	SEC	Nick Saban	Jamey Chadwell
2015	Troy	L, 16–44	Sun Belt	Neal Brown	Jamey Chadwell
2014	Georgia	L, 9–55	SEC	Mark Richt	Jamey Chadwell
2014	Vanderbilt	L, 20–21	SEC	Derek Mason	Jamey Chadwell
2013	Colorado	L, 10–43	Pac-12	Mike MacIntyre	Jamey Chadwell
2012	Illinois	L, 0–44	Big Ten	Tim Beckman	Jay Mills
2011	UCF	L, 0–62	C-USA	George O'Leary	Jay Mills
2011	Florida State	L, 10–62	ACC	Jimbo Fisher	Jay Mills
2010	Kentucky	L, 21–49	SEC	Joker Phillips	Jay Mills
2010	Hawaii	L, 7–66	WAC	Greg McMackin	Jay Mills
2009	South Florida	L, 0–59	Big East	Jim Leavitt	Jay Mills
2009	Florida	L, 3–62	SEC	Urban Meyer	Jay Mills
2008	Miami (OH)	L, 27–38	MAC	Don Treadwell	Jay Mills
2008	Miami (FL)	L, 7–52	ACC	Randy Shannon	Jay Mills
2007	Hawaii	L, 10–66	WAC	June Jones	Jay Mills
2003	South Florida	L, 7–55	Big East	Jim Leavitt	Jay Mills
2002	South Florida	L, 6–56	Big East	Jim Leavitt	David Dowd
Charleston Southern 0 – FBS Schools 25

== Facilities ==
- Buccaneer Ballpark – home of the baseball program. It has a capacity of 1,500 spectators.
- Buccaneer Field – home of the football program. It opened in 1970 and has a capacity of 4,000 spectators.
- CSU Field House – home of the Men's and Women's Basketball teams. It has a capacity of 881 spectators. It is the 2nd smallest arena in Division I basketball.

== Notable alumni ==
=== Baseball ===
- Stuart Lake
- Bobby Parnell
- George Schaefer
- Tyler Thornburg

=== Men's basketball ===
- Rolando Hourruitiner

=== Men's soccer ===
- John Patrick Devereux

=== Men’s cross country ===
- Fearghal Curtin
