= Loyola Ramblers =

Athletic program of Loyola University Chicago

- University: Loyola University Chicago
- Nickname: Ramblers
- NCAA: Division I
- Conference: Atlantic 10 Conference (primary); MIVA (men's volleyball)
- Athletic director: Steve Watson
- Location: Chicago, Illinois
- Varsity teams: 15 (7 men’s and 8 women’s)
- Basketball arena: Joseph J. Gentile Arena
- Soccer stadium: Loyola Soccer Park
- Colors: Maroon and gold
- Mascot: LU Wolf
- Fight song: Hail Loyola!
- Website: loyolaramblers.com
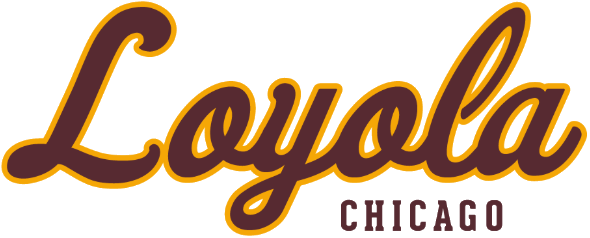

The Loyola Ramblers (also called the Loyola Chicago Ramblers) are the varsity sports teams of Loyola University Chicago. Since July 2022, most of its teams compete in the Atlantic 10 Conference.

The nickname "Ramblers" was first used in 1926. The University attributes the name to media coverage that year which referred to the football team "rambling from state to state," which was shortened to "the Ramblers."

Notable athletes from Loyola have included middle-distance runner Tom O'Hara, volleyball player Thomas Jaeschke, and basketball players Mike Novak, Jerry Harkness, Les Hunter, Wayne Sappleton, Alfredrick Hughes, LaRue Martin, and Blake Schilb.

== Conference affiliation history ==
Atlantic 10 Conference logo in Loyola Ramblers colors

Loyola Chicago was a charter member of the Midwestern City Conference when it was established on June 16, 1979. The intercollegiate athletic circuit eventually rebranded twice, first as the Midwestern Collegiate Conference in 1985 and then the Horizon League on June 4, 2001. The university announced on April 12, 2013, that it was leaving the Horizon League to replace Creighton as the tenth member of the Missouri Valley Conference (MVC) beginning 2 1/2 months later on July 1.

Prior to the conclusion of its nine years in the MVC, the Ramblers were accepted by the Atlantic 10 Conference (A-10) on November 16, 2021, as its 15th member beginning July 1, 2022. The Ramblers' women's golf team competed as associate member of the Metro Atlantic Athletic Conference (MAAC) 2022-2024, until the A-10 began sponsoring the sport in the 2024-2025 season.

The men's volleyball team has been a member of the Midwestern Intercollegiate Volleyball Association (MIVA) since adding the sport in 1996.

== Sports sponsored ==
Men's sports	Women's sports
Basketball	Basketball
Cross country	Cross country
Golf	Golf
Soccer	Soccer
Track and field^{†}	Softball
Volleyball	Track and field^{†}
	Volleyball
† – Track and field includes both indoor and outdoor

A member of the Atlantic 10 Conference, Loyola University Chicago sponsors teams in seven men's and eight women's NCAA sanctioned sports.

Football was discontinued at Loyola after the 1930 season. The university had previously fielded a varsity football team intermittently from 1892 to 1930.

=== Baseball ===
Phil Weintraub, later a Major League Baseball player, played for the Loyola baseball team.

=== Men's basketball ===
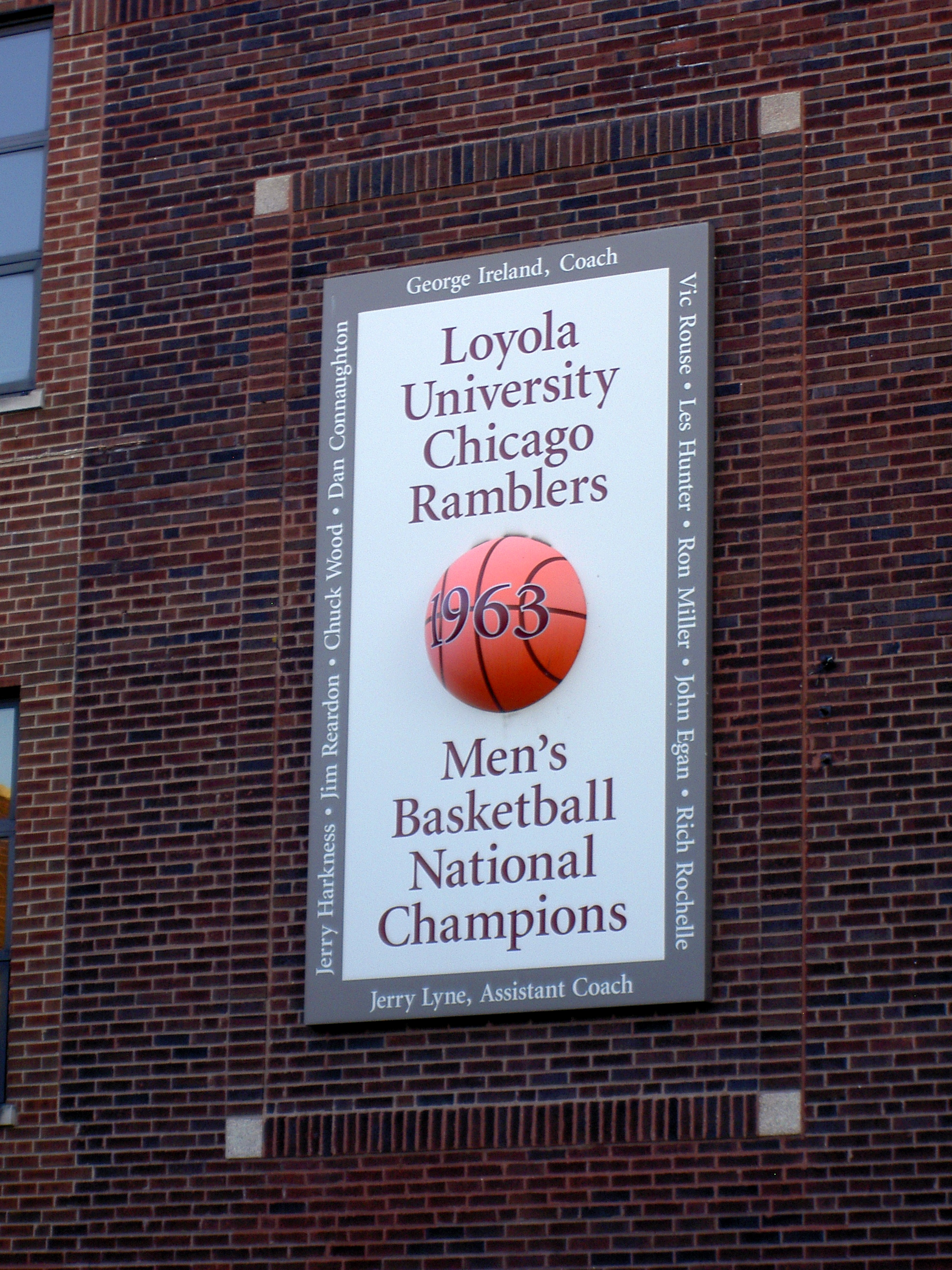
Plaque commemorating the 1963 men's basketball team on the side of the Alumni Gym

The basketball team has played at the Joseph J. Gentile Arena since 1996; before then, they played home games at Alumni Gym. The 1962–1963 team, led by coach George Ireland, won the 1963 NCAA University Division basketball tournament (predecessor to the current Division I men's tournament), defeating the University of Cincinnati 60–58 in the title game. Vic Rouse tipped in the winning bucket in overtime to win the game. During their tournament run, the Ramblers also won a historically notable game against Mississippi State, an all-white team that defied a state court order in order to play said game. The Ramblers made it back to the regional semifinals the following year and qualified for the tournament in 1966 and 1968.

They would not make the national tournament again until 1985, in which they lost to eventual tournament runner-up Georgetown in the Sweet Sixteen. In 2018, the Ramblers returned to the tournament for the first time in 33 years. As a No. 11 seed, they upset No. 6 seed Miami (FL) and No. 3 seed Tennessee to qualify for the Sweet Sixteen. They faced Nevada in the regional semifinal and defeated the Wolf Pack 69–68 to advance to the Elite 8 against Kansas State. They advanced to the Final Four by beating Kansas State 78–62. In the Final Four, they lost to Michigan 69–57.

Loyola made it to the finals of the National Invitation Tournament in 1939 and 1949 and qualified for 1962 and 1980 tournaments. They won the College Basketball Invitational in 2015.

=== Men's volleyball ===
The volleyball team is coached by Loyola alumnus Shane Davis. His record through twelve seasons is 265–88 (.751).

In 2013, the Ramblers were defeated by the UCI Anteaters 0–3 (24–26, 18–25, 27–29) in the first semifinal of the NCAA championships on May 2, 2013, at UCLA's Pauley Pavilion. This was the team's first appearance ever in an NCAA men's collegiate volleyball tournament.

On May 3, 2014, Loyola, playing host to the 2014 Championships, defeated the Stanford Cardinal 3–1 to win the program's first-ever NCAA Men's National Collegiate Volleyball Championship.

Loyola successfully defended their championship in 2015, defeating Lewis 3–2 at Stanford's Maples Pavilion.

== National championships ==
Team	Tournament	Titles	Years won	Ref.
Basketball	NCAA Division I tournament	1	1963	
Volleyball	NCAA tournament	2	2014, 2015	

== Facilities ==
Facility	Opened	Renovated	Sport	Capacity
Joseph J. Gentile Arena	1996	2011	Basketball; Volleyball	4,486
Loyola Soccer Park	1996	2000, 2005, 2007	Soccer	500
Loyola Softball Park	1997	2000, 2005, 2007	Softball	500
Norville Center for Intercollegiate Athletics	2011		Training center	—
The Alfie Norville Practice Facility	2019		Training center	—

Loyola does not have local competition sites for cross country, golf, or track and field.
