= Cliff Sherman =

American football coach

Coaching career (HC unless noted)
- 1969–1970: Attleboro HS (MA)
- 1971–1982: Providence (OC)
- 1983–1987: Stonehill (club team)
- 1988–1989: Stonehill

Head coaching record
- Overall: 7–6–1 (varsity college)

Accomplishments and honors

Championships
- 1 ECFC (1989)

Awards
- Attleboro Area Hall of Fame (2008)

Cliff Sherman is a retired American football coach. He served as the first varsity head coach of Stonehill College in Easton, Massachusetts, compiling a record of 6–5–1.

After retiring from collegiate coaching, he returned to Attleboro High School in Attleboro, Massachusetts, where he had previously served as the head coach in 1969 and 1970, and led that team again from 1991 until his retirement in 2001.

== Head coaching record ==
=== College ===
Year	Team	Overall	Conference	Standing	Bowl/playoffs
Stonehill Skyhawks (Eastern Collegiate Football Conference) (1988–1989)
1988	Stonehill	1–3–1			
1989	Stonehill	6–3	5–1	1st	
Stonehill:		7–6–1			
Total:		7–6–1			
National championship Conference title Conference division title or championship game berth
