= 2022 Stonehill Skyhawks football team =

American college football season

2022 Stonehill Skyhawks football
- Conference: Northeast Conference
- Record: 4–5 (2–5 NEC)
- Head coach: Eli Gardner (6th season)
- Offensive coordinator: Tyler Moody (6th season)
- Defensive coordinator: Kyle Jones (2nd season)
- Home stadium: W.B. Mason Stadium

2022 Northeast Conference football standings
	Conf.			Overall
Team	W		L	W		L
Saint Francis (PA) $^	7	–	0	9	–	3
Merrimack *	6	–	1	8	–	3
LIU	4	–	3	4	–	7
Duquesne	3	–	4	4	–	7
Sacred Heart	3	–	4	5	–	6
Central Connecticut	2	–	5	2	–	9
Stonehill *	2	–	5	4	–	5
Wagner	1	–	6	1	–	10
$ – Conference champion; ^ – FCS playoff participant; Note: Merrimack and Stonehill ineligible for NEC title and FCS postseason play due to transition from NCAA Division II; Rankings from STATS Poll

The 2022 Stonehill Skyhawks football team represented Stonehill College as a first-year member of the Northeast Conference (NEC) during the 2022 NCAA Division I FCS football season. The Skyhawks, led by six-year head coach Eli Gardner, played their home games at W.B. Mason Stadium. Stonehill was ineligible for NEC title and FCS postseason play due to transition from NCAA Division II.

== Schedule ==
Date	Time	Opponent	Site	TV	Result	Attendance
September 3	2:00 p.m.	at Bloomsburg*	Robert B. Redman Stadium; Bloomsburg, PA	PSAC Sports DN	W 33–30 ^{2OT}	3,426
September 10	1:00 p.m.	Post*	W.B. Mason Stadium; Easton, MA	NEC Front Row	W 76–0	1,533
October 1	12:00 p.m.	Duquesne	W.B. Mason Stadium; Easton, MA	ESPN3	W 24–20	1,696
October 15	1:00 p.m.	at Sacred Heart	Campus Field; Fairfield, CT	NEC Front Row	L 27–40	10,153
October 22	1:00 p.m.	at Saint Francis (PA)	DeGol Field; Loretto, PA	ESPN3	L 13–17	2,026
October 29	1:00 p.m.	Merrimack^{†}	W.B. Mason Stadium; Easton, MA	NEC Front Row	L 10-17	1,663
November 5	1:00 p.m.	Wagner	W.B. Mason Stadium; Easton, MA	NEC Front Row	W 50–10	1,116
November 12	1:00 p.m.	at LIU	Bethpage Federal Credit Union Stadium; Brookville, NY	NEC Front Row	L 28–34	532
November 19	1:00 p.m.	Central Connecticut	W.B. Mason Stadium; Easton, MA	NEC Front Row	L 14–39	1,369
*Non-conference game; ^{†}Homecoming; All times are in Eastern time

== Game summaries ==
=== At Bloomsburg ===
	1	2	3	4	OT	2OT	Total
Skyhawks	3	10	3	11	0	6	33
Huskies	0	17	7	3	0	3	30

=== Post ===
	1	2	3	4	Total
Eagles	0	0	0	0	0
Skyhawks	41	14	21	0	76

=== Duquesne ===
	1	2	3	4	Total
Dukes	10	7	3	0	20
Skyhawks	3	7	7	7	24

=== At Sacred Heart ===
	1	2	3	4	Total
Skyhawks	0	7	7	13	27
Pioneers	3	17	14	6	40

=== At Saint Francis (PA) ===
	1	2	3	4	Total
Skyhawks	3	3	7	0	13
Red Flash	14	0	3	0	17

=== Merrimack ===
	1	2	3	4	Total
Warriors	0	3	14	0	17
Skyhawks	3	7	0	0	10

=== Wagner ===
	1	2	3	4	Total
Seahawks	3	7	0	0	10
Skyhawks	14	17	7	12	50

=== At LIU ===
	1	2	3	4	Total
Skyhawks	0	7	7	14	28
Sharks	14	13	0	7	34

=== Central Connecticut ===
	1	2	3	4	Total
Blue Devils	6	6	20	7	39
Skyhawks	7	7	0	0	14
