= 2016 NCAA Division II Field Hockey Championship =

Tournament details
- Country: United States
- Teams: 6

Final positions
- Champions: Shippensburg (2nd title)
- Runners-up: LIU Post

Tournament statistics
- Matches played: 5
- Goals scored: 12 (2.4 per match)

The 2016 NCAA Division II Field Hockey Championship is the 28th women's collegiate field hockey tournament to determine the top NCAA Division II college field hockey team in the United States. The semifinals and championship match will be played at W.B. Mason Stadium at Stonehill College in Easton, Massachusetts from November 18 to 20, 2016.

Shippensburg defeated LIU Post, 2–0, in the final, the Raiders' second national title.

== Qualified teams ==
- The total number of teams remained fixed at 6. Teams qualified for the tournament based on their regional rankings at the end of the season, with the top three teams from each region making the final bracket.

=== Atlantic Region ===
Rank	Team	Record
#1	Millersville	17–4
#2	East Stroudsburg	15–4
#3	Shippensburg	16–3

=== East Region ===
Rank	Team	Record
#1	LIU Post	15–3
#2	Saint Anselm	16–4
#3	Stonehill	14–5

== Bracket ==
First Round; November 12, 2016; Campus sites
East Region
E2	Saint Anselm*	3
E3	Stonehill	1
Atlantic Region
A2	East Stroudsburg*	1
A3	Shippensburg	2

Semifinals; November 18, 2016; Easton, MA
E1	LIU Post	1
E2	Saint Anselm	0
A1	Millersville	0
A3	Shippensburg	1

Championship; November 20, 2016; Easton, MA
E1	LIU Post	1
A3	Shippensburg	2

== See also ==
- NCAA Division I Field Hockey Championship
- NCAA Division III Field Hockey Championship
