= Dave Swanton =

American football coach

Biographical details
- Education: Bridgewater State

Coaching career (HC unless noted)
- 1982–1989: Stonehill (OL)
- 1990–1992: Stonehill

Head coaching record
- Overall: 14–10–2

Accomplishments and honors

Championships
- 1 ECFC (1991)

Dave Swanton is a retired American football coach. He served as the head coach of Stonehill College in Easton, Massachusetts, compiling a record of 14–10–2.

After retiring from collegiate coaching, he served as the headmaster at Braintree High School in Braintree, Massachusetts.

== Head coaching record ==
| Year | Team | Overall | Conference | Standing | Bowl/playoffs |
|---|---|---|---|---|---|
Stonehill Skyhawks (Eastern Collegiate Football Conference) (1990–1992)
| 1990 | Stonehill | 3–4–1 | 3–1 | 2nd | |
| 1991 | Stonehill | 5–4 | 5–0 | 1st | |
| 1992 | Stonehill | 6–2–1 | 4–1–1 | T–2nd | |
| Stonehill: | | 14–10–2 | 12–2–1 | | |
| Total: | | 14–10–2 | | | |
