= 2022 Merrimack Warriors football team =

American college football season

2022 Merrimack Warriors football
- Conference: Northeast Conference
- Record: 8–3 (6–1 NEC)
- Head coach: Dan Curran (10th season)
- Defensive coordinator: Mike Gennetti (18th season)
- Home stadium: Duane Stadium

2022 Northeast Conference football standings
| | Conf. | | | Overall |
| Team | W | | L | W | | L |
|---|---|---|---|---|---|---|
| Saint Francis (PA) $^ | 7 | – | 0 | 9 | – | 3 |
| Merrimack * | 6 | – | 1 | 8 | – | 3 |
| LIU | 4 | – | 3 | 4 | – | 7 |
| Duquesne | 3 | – | 4 | 4 | – | 7 |
| Sacred Heart | 3 | – | 4 | 5 | – | 6 |
| Central Connecticut | 2 | – | 5 | 2 | – | 9 |
| Stonehill * | 2 | – | 5 | 4 | – | 5 |
| Wagner | 1 | – | 6 | 1 | – | 10 |
$ – Conference champion; ^ – FCS playoff participant; Note: Merrimack and Stonehill ineligible for NEC title and FCS postseason play due to transition from NCAA Division II; Rankings from STATS Poll

The 2022 Merrimack Warriors football team represented Merrimack College as a member of the Northeast Conference (NEC) in the 2022 NCAA Division I FCS football season. This was the 4th and final year of the transition from Division 2. The Warriors were led by tenth-year head coach Dan Curran and played their home games at Duane Stadium in North Andover, MA. They finished the year 8–3, tying the program single season wins record. They played Saint Francis (PA) in the conference championship losing 52–23.

== Schedule ==
| Date | Time | Opponent | Site | TV | Result | Attendance |
|---|---|---|---|---|---|---|
| September 2 | 7:00 p.m. | No. 16 Holy Cross* | Duane Stadium; North Andover, MA | NEC Front Row | L 17–31 | 8,147 |
| September 9 | 6:30 p.m. | Assumption* | Duane Stadium; North Andover, MA | NEC Front Row | W 45–17 | 5,675 |
| September 16 | 7:00 p.m. | at Harvard* | Harvard Stadium; Boston, MA | ESPN+ | L 21–28^{OT} | 10,946 |
| September 24 | 2:00 p.m. | at Delaware State* | Alumni Stadium; Dover, DE | ESPN+ | W 26–13 | 1,924 |
| October 1 | 1:00 p.m. | LIU | Duane Stadium; North Andover, MA | NEC Front Row | W 24–23 | 12,622 |
| October 8 | 1:00 p.m. | at Duquesne | Arthur J. Rooney Athletic Field; Pittsburgh, PA | ESPN3 | W 28–21 | 2,679 |
| October 15 | 1:00 p.m. | Wagner | Duane Stadium; North Andover, MA | ESPN3 | W 54–17 | 2,223 |
| October 22 | 1:00 p.m. | Sacred Heart | Duane Stadium; North Andover, MA | NEC Front Row | W 31–25 | 2,519 |
| October 29 | 1:00 p.m. | at Stonehill | W.B. Mason Stadium; Easton, MA | NEC Front Row | W 17–10 | 1,663 |
| November 12 | 12:00 p.m. | at Central Connecticut | Arute Field; New Britain, CT | NEC Front Row | W 20–14 | 1,022 |
| November 19 | 12:00 p.m. | Saint Francis (PA) | Duane Stadium; North Andover, MA | ESPN3 | L 23–52 | 3,361 |
*Non-conference game; Rankings from STATS Poll released prior to the game; All times are in Eastern time

== Preseason ==
The Warriors added five players via transfer.

| Name | Number | Pos. | Height | Weight | Year | Hometown | Transfer from |
|---|---|---|---|---|---|---|---|
| Jack Zergiotis | #11 | QB | 6'2 | 218 | Sophomore | Montreal, QC | UConn |
| A.J. Urbaniak | #64 | OL | 6'4 | 275 | (redshirt) Freshman | Williamsville, NY | Buffalo |
| Damien Williams | #39 | LB | 6'1 | 230 | Senior | Fort Washington, MD | Saint Anselm |
| Antonio Derry | #59 | OL | 6'4 | 305 | (redshirt) Junior | Parkville, MD | Stetson |
| Rudy Holland | #54 | DL | 6'0 | 295 | Graduate Student | Forestville, MD | Stonehill |

Key departures include :
Weston Elliott (QB – 11 games, 11 started).
Caleb Holden (CB – 11 games, 11 started).

=== Recruits ===
College recruiting information (2022)
| Name | Hometown | School | Height | Weight | Commit date |
|---|---|---|---|---|---|
| Kendal Sims; LB | Washington, DC | Saint John's College | 6 ft 1 in (1.85 m) | 225 lb (102 kg) | December 15, 2021 (Committed) / December 15, 2021 (Signed) |
| Kendal Sims; LB | Recruit ratings: No ratings found | | | | |
| Bryce Ricks; DL | Gaithersburg, MD | Quince Orchard | 6 ft 1 in (1.85 m) | 315 lb (143 kg) | December 15, 2021 (Committed) / December 15, 2021 (Signed) |
| Bryce Ricks; DL | Recruit ratings: No ratings found | | | | |
| Chase Collyer; WR | Windsor, CT | Loomis Chaffee | 5 ft 9 in (1.75 m) | 175 lb (79 kg) | December 15, 2021 (Committed) / December 15, 2021 (Signed) |
| Chase Collyer; WR | Recruit ratings: No ratings found | | | | |
| Ty Yocum; TE | Reading, PA | Exeter Township Senior High School | 6 ft 0 in (1.83 m) | 225 lb (102 kg) | November 14, 2021 (Committed) / December 15, 2021 (Signed) |
| Ty Yocum; TE | Recruit ratings: No ratings found | | | | |
| Tommy Dombo; OL | Washington, DC | Gonzaga College High School | 6 ft 2 in (1.88 m) | 305 lb (138 kg) | December 15, 2021 (Committed) / December 15, 2021 (Signed) |
| Tommy Dombo; OL | Recruit ratings: No ratings found | | | | |
| Christian Smith; OL | Rumson, NJ | Rumson-Fair Haven High School | 6 ft 2 in (1.88 m) | 270 lb (120 kg) | December 15, 2021 (Committed) / December 15, 2021 (Signed) |
| Christian Smith; OL | Recruit ratings: No ratings found | | | | |
| Messiah Attakorah; WR | Worcester, MA | Doherty Memorial High School | 6 ft 3 in (1.91 m) | 170 lb (77 kg) | December 15, 2021 (Committed) / December 15, 2021 (Signed) |
| Messiah Attakorah; WR | Recruit ratings: No ratings found | | | | |
| Jack McManus; H-back | Wallingford, CT | Choate Rosemary Hall | 6 ft 2 in (1.88 m) | 225 lb (102 kg) | December 15, 2021 (Committed) / December 15, 2021 (Signed) |
| Jack McManus; H-back | Recruit ratings: No ratings found | | | | |
| Jake Fitzgerald; LB | La Cañada Flintridge, CA | Cathedral High School (Los Angeles) | 6 ft 0 in (1.83 m) | 215 lb (98 kg) | December 15, 2021 (Committed) / December 15, 2021 (Signed) |
| Jake Fitzgerald; LB | Recruit ratings: No ratings found | | | | |
| Mack Gulla; RB | Franklin, MA | Franklin High School | 5 ft 10 in (1.78 m) | 190 lb (86 kg) | December 15, 2021 (Committed) / December 15, 2021 (Signed) |
| Mack Gulla; RB | Recruit ratings: No ratings found | | | | |
| Carlton Thai; K | Calgary, AB | Ernest Manning High School | 5 ft 9 in (1.75 m) | 160 lb (73 kg) | December 15, 2021 (Committed) / December 15, 2021 (Signed) |
| Carlton Thai; K | Recruit ratings: No ratings found | | | | |
| Ethan Haust; OL | Baldwinsville, NY | Charles W. Baker High School | 6 ft 1 in (1.85 m) | 255 lb (116 kg) | December 15, 2021 (Committed) / December 15, 2021 (Signed) |
| Ethan Haust; OL | Recruit ratings: No ratings found | | | | |
