= WSHL =

WSHL may refer to:

- Western States Hockey League, a junior ice hockey league in the United States.
- WSHL-FM, a student run radio station (91.3 FM) at Stonehill College in Easton, Massachusetts.
