= Robert Talley =

American football coach and player

Biographical details
- Education: Boston University

Playing career
- 1987–1990: Boston University

Coaching career (HC unless noted)
- 1991–1995: UMass (DE/ST)
- 1996: Colby (LB)
- 1997–2004: Dartmouth (DB/DC)
- 2005–2006: San Francisco 49ers (Special assistant)
- 2007–2015: Stonehill

Administrative career (AD unless noted)
- 2016–2021: Chico State (Director of Development–Athletics)

Head coaching record
- Overall: 48–46

Accomplishments and honors

Championships
- Northeast-10 (2013)

Robert Talley is an American former football coach and player. He served as the head coach of Stonehill College in Easton, Massachusetts from 2007 to 2015, compiling a record of 48–46. He left that program as the school's all–time winningest coach.

He formerly served as the Director of Development for Athletics at the California State University, Chico. He currently serves as a program coordinator for the Chico Area Recreation & Park District (CARD) in the flag football department, where he has gone on to coach his sons. He is credited with introducing the controversial end-around offense to the league. He won his first and only CARD Flag Football Championship on October 11, 2023, in the middle school division.

== Head coaching record ==
Year	Team	Overall	Conference	Standing	Bowl/playoffs
Stonehill Skyhawks (Northeast-10 Conference) (2007–2015)
2007	Stonehill	5–5	5–4	5th	
2008	Stonehill	4–6	2–5	6th	
2009	Stonehill	5–5	4–4	T–5th	
2010	Stonehill	5–5	3–5	T–6th	
2011	Stonehill	4–7	3–5	T–6th	
2012	Stonehill	5–5	5–3	4th	
2013	Stonehill	8–3	8–1	T–1st	
2014	Stonehill	5–6	4–5	T–6th	
2015	Stonehill	7–4	5–4	T–4th	
Stonehill:		48–46	39–36		
Total:		48–46			
National championship Conference title Conference division title or championship game berth
