= Eastern Football Conference =

The Eastern Football Conference may refer to:

- Eastern Football Conference (1965–1974), an NCAA College Division conference
- Eastern Football Conference (1997–2000), an NCAA Division II conference
- East Division (CFL), known as the "Eastern Football Conference" between 1960 and 1980

It could also refer to the Eastern Collegiate Football Conference, the name of two separate NCAA conferences:

- Eastern Collegiate Football Conference (1988–1997), an NCAA Division II conference
- Eastern Collegiate Football Conference, an active NCAA Division III conference established in 2009
