= List of Northeast-10 Conference football standings =

This is a list of yearly Northeast-10 Conference football standings.

== Northeast-10 standings ==
2012 Northeast-10 Conference football standings
	Conf.			Overall
Team	W		L	W		L
No. 8 New Haven y$^	8	–	0	10	–	1
American International y	7	–	1	7	–	3
Bentley	6	–	2	8	–	2
Stonehill	5	–	3	5	–	5
Merrimack	4	–	4	6	–	4
Assumption	3	–	5	3	–	7
Southern Connecticut	2	–	6	3	–	8
Saint Anselm	1	–	7	2	–	9
Pace	0	–	8	0	–	9
Championship: New Haven 37, American International 12
$ – Conference champion; y – Championship game participant; ^ – NCAA Division II playoff participant; Rankings from AFCA poll

2013 Northeast-10 Conference football standings
	Conf.			Overall
Team	W		L	W		L
American International y$^	8	–	1	9	–	3
Stonehill y	8	–	1	8	–	3
New Haven	7	–	2	8	–	3
Assumption	6	–	3	6	–	5
Merrimack	5	–	4	7	–	4
Bentley	4	–	5	6	–	5
LIU Post	3	–	6	5	–	6
Southern Connecticut	3	–	6	3	–	8
Saint Anselm	1	–	8	1	–	10
Pace	0	–	9	0	–	11
Championship: American International 27, Stonehill 17
$ – Conference champion; y – Championship game participant; ^ – NCAA Division II playoff participant

2014 Northeast-10 Conference football standings
	Conf.			Overall
Team	W		L	W		L
American International y	8	–	1	8	–	3
LIU Post y$^	7	–	2	8	–	4
Assumption	6	–	3	7	–	4
New Haven	6	–	3	6	–	5
Saint Anselm	5	–	4	6	–	5
Stonehill	4	–	5	5	–	6
Merrimack	4	–	5	4	–	7
Bentley	3	–	6	5	–	6
Southern Connecticut	2	–	7	2	–	9
Pace	0	–	9	1	–	10
Championship: LIU Post 58, American International 25
$ – Conference champion; y – Championship game participant; ^ – NCAA Division II playoff participant

2015 Northeast-10 Conference football standings
	Conf.			Overall
Team	W		L	W		L
No. 17 Assumption y$^	8	–	1	11	–	2
New Haven y	7	–	2	7	–	4
Merrimack	6	–	3	6	–	5
LIU Post	5	–	4	7	–	4
Stonehill	5	–	4	7	–	4
Bentley	5	–	4	5	–	6
American International	4	–	5	4	–	7
Southern Connecticut	3	–	6	4	–	7
Saint Anselm	2	–	7	3	–	8
Pace	0	–	9	1	–	10
Championship: Assumption 17, New Haven 14
$ – Conference champion; y – Championship game participant; ^ – NCAA Division II playoff participant; Rankings from AFCA poll

2016 Northeast-10 Conference football standings
	Conf.			Overall
Team	W		L	W		L
No. 11 LIU Post y$^	9	–	0	12	–	1
Assumption y^	8	–	1	9	–	3
New Haven	6	–	3	7	–	4
Southern Connecticut	6	–	3	6	–	5
Bentley	5	–	4	5	–	6
Stonehill	4	–	5	5	–	6
American International	3	–	6	4	–	7
Merrimack	2	–	7	3	–	8
Saint Anselm	2	–	7	2	–	9
Pace	0	–	9	0	–	11
Championship: LIU Post 43, Assumption 23
$ – Conference champion; y – Championship game participant; ^ – NCAA Division II playoff participant; Rankings from AFCA poll
