= 2022 Wagner Seahawks football team =

American college football season

2022 Wagner Seahawks football
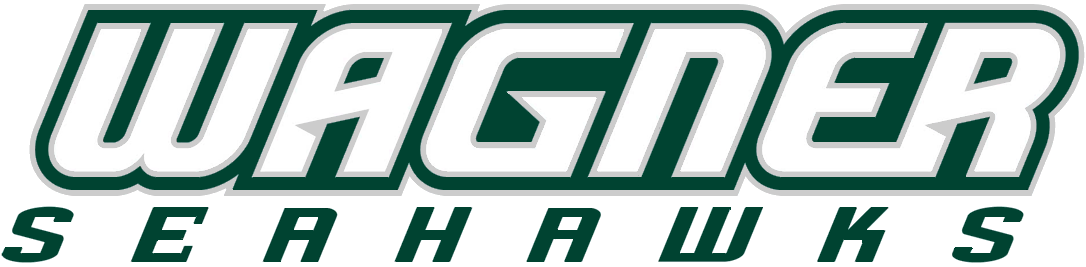
- Conference: Northeast Conference
- Record: 1–10 (1–6 NEC)
- Head coach: Tom Masella (3rd season)
- Offensive coordinator: Chris Nugai (3rd season)
- Defensive coordinator: Darrell Wilson (1st season)
- Home stadium: Wagner College Stadium

2022 Northeast Conference football standings
	Conf.			Overall
Team	W		L	W		L
Saint Francis (PA) $^	7	–	0	9	–	3
Merrimack *	6	–	1	8	–	3
LIU	4	–	3	4	–	7
Duquesne	3	–	4	4	–	7
Sacred Heart	3	–	4	5	–	6
Central Connecticut	2	–	5	2	–	9
Stonehill *	2	–	5	4	–	5
Wagner	1	–	6	1	–	10
$ – Conference champion; ^ – FCS playoff participant; Note: Merrimack and Stonehill ineligible for NEC title and FCS postseason play due to transition from NCAA Division II; Rankings from STATS Poll

The 2022 Wagner Seahawks football team represented Wagner College as a member of the Northeast Conference (NEC) during the 2022 NCAA Division I FCS football season. The Seahawks, led by third-year head coach Tom Masella, played their home games at Wagner College Stadium.

On October 21, Wagner defeated LIU 37–26, ending a 26-game losing streak that dated back to the 2019 season, the longest losing streak in Division I football at the time. Ironically, their last win before the losing streak was also against LIU.

== Schedule ==
Date	Time	Opponent	Site	TV	Result	Attendance
September 1	6:00 p.m.	Fordham*	Wagner College Stadium; Staten Island, NY	NEC Front Row	L 31–48	3,000
September 10	4:00 p.m.	at Rutgers*	SHI Stadium; Piscataway, NJ	BTN	L 7–66	47,621
September 17	4:00 p.m.	Saint Francis (PA)	Wagner College Stadium; Staten Island, NY	NEC Front Row	L 7–27	2,570
October 1	5:00 p.m.	at Syracuse*	JMA Wireless Dome; Syracuse, NY	ESPN+	L 0–59	
October 8	1:00 p.m.	at Columbia*	Robert K. Kraft Field at Lawrence A. Wien Stadium; New York, NY	ESPN+	L 7–28	
October 15	1:00 p.m.	at Merrimack	Duane Stadium; North Andover, MA	ESPN3	L 17–54	
October 21	7:00 p.m.	LIU	Wagner College Stadium; Staten Island, NY	ESPN3	W 37–26	998
October 29	12:00 p.m.	at Central Connecticut	Arute Field; New Britain, CT	NEC Front Row	L 7–34	
November 5	1:00 p.m.	at Stonehill	W.B. Mason Stadium; Easton, MA	NEC Front Row	L 10–50	
November 12	12:00 p.m.	Sacred Heart	Wagner College Stadium; Staten Island, NY	NEC Front Row	L 28–38	847
November 19	12:00 p.m.	at Duquesne	Arthur J. Rooney Athletic Field; Pittsburgh, PA	NEC Front Row	L 0–33	
*Non-conference game; All times are in Eastern time

== Game summaries ==
=== Fordham ===
	1	2	3	4	Total
Rams	7	7	20	14	48
Seahawks	7	14	7	3	31

=== At Rutgers ===
	1	2	3	4	Total
Seahawks	0	7	0	0	7
Scarlet Knights	28	10	14	14	66

=== Saint Francis (PA) ===
	1	2	3	4	Total
Red Flash	7	7	10	3	27
Seahawks	7	0	0	0	7

=== At Syracuse ===
	1	2	3	4	Total
Seahawks	0	0	0	0	0
Orange	21	28	7	3	59

=== At Columbia ===
	1	2	3	4	Total
Seahawks	0	0	0	7	7
Lions	0	7	14	7	28

=== At Merrimack ===
	1	2	3	4	Total
Seahawks	7	7	3	0	17
Warriors	0	12	21	21	54

=== LIU ===
	1	2	3	4	Total
Sharks	0	16	3	7	26
Seahawks	7	17	6	7	37

=== At Central Connecticut ===
	1	2	3	4	Total
Seahawks	0	7	0	0	7
Blue Devils	7	21	0	6	34

=== At Stonehill ===
	1	2	3	4	Total
Seahawks	3	7	0	0	10
Skyhawks	14	17	7	12	50

=== Sacred Heart ===
	1	2	3	4	Total
Pioneers	3	7	7	21	38
Seahawks	7	0	6	15	28

=== At Duquesne ===
	1	2	3	4	Total
Seahawks	0	0	0	0	0
Dukes	7	17	9	0	33
