= 2022 Duquesne Dukes football team =

American college football season

2022 Duquesne Dukes football
- Conference: Northeast Conference
- Record: 4–7 (3–4 NEC)
- Head coach: Jerry Schmitt (18th season)
- Offensive coordinator: Anthony Doria (7th season)
- Co-defensive coordinators: Mike Craig (1st season); Scott Farison (1st season)
- Home stadium: Arthur J. Rooney Athletic Field

2022 Northeast Conference football standings
	Conf.			Overall
Team	W		L	W		L
Saint Francis (PA) $^	7	–	0	9	–	3
Merrimack *	6	–	1	8	–	3
LIU	4	–	3	4	–	7
Duquesne	3	–	4	4	–	7
Sacred Heart	3	–	4	5	–	6
Central Connecticut	2	–	5	2	–	9
Stonehill *	2	–	5	4	–	5
Wagner	1	–	6	1	–	10
$ – Conference champion; ^ – FCS playoff participant; Note: Merrimack and Stonehill ineligible for NEC title and FCS postseason play due to transition from NCAA Division II; Rankings from STATS Poll

The 2022 Duquesne Dukes football team represented Duquesne University as a member of the Northeast Conference (NEC) during the 2022 NCAA Division I FCS football season. The Dukes, led by 18th-year head coach Jerry Schmitt, played their home games at Arthur J. Rooney Athletic Field.

== Schedule ==
Date	Time	Opponent	Site	TV	Result	Attendance
August 27	5:00 p.m.	at Florida State*	Doak Campbell Stadium; Tallahassee, FL	ACCN	L 7–47	51,207
September 3	2:00 p.m.	at Youngstown State*	Stambaugh Stadium; Youngstown, OH	ESPN+	L 14–31	9,835
September 10	12:00 p.m.	Thomas More*	Arthur J. Rooney Athletic Field; Pittsburgh, PA	NEC Front Row	W 34–14	1,410
September 17	11:59 p.m.	at Hawaii*	Clarence T. C. Ching Athletics Complex; Honolulu, HI	Spectrum	L 14–24	8,991
October 1	12:00 p.m.	at Stonehill	W.B. Mason Stadium; Easton, MA	ESPN3	L 20–24	1,696
October 8	1:00 p.m.	Merrimack^{†}	Arthur J. Rooney Athletic Field; Pittsburgh, PA	ESPN3	L 21–28	2,679
October 22	12:00 p.m.	at Central Connecticut	Arute Field; New Britain, CT	NEC Front Row	W 30–6	2,122
October 29	12:00 p.m.	LIU	Arthur J. Rooney Athletic Field; Pittsburgh, PA	NEC Front Row	L 48–50 ^{2OT}	818
November 5	12:00 p.m.	Sacred Heart	Arthur J. Rooney Athletic Field; Pittsburgh, PA	NEC Front Row	W 35–28 ^{OT}	875
November 12	12:00 p.m.	at Saint Francis (PA)	DeGol Field; Loretto, PA	NEC Front Row	L 14–51	1,251
November 19	12:00 p.m.	Wagner	Arthur J. Rooney Athletic Field; Pittsburgh, PA	NEC Front Row	W 33–0	1,006
*Non-conference game; ^{†}Homecoming; All times are in Eastern time

== Game summaries ==
=== At Florida State ===
	1	2	3	4	Total
Dukes	0	0	7	0	7
Seminoles	20	6	14	7	47

=== At Youngstown State ===
	1	2	3	4	Total
Dukes	7	0	7	0	14
Penguins	7	10	0	14	31

=== Thomas More ===
	1	2	3	4	Total
Saints	0	0	0	14	14
Dukes	0	17	7	10	34

=== At Hawaii ===
Duquesne Dukes (1–2) at Hawaii Rainbow Warriors (0–3)

Quarter	1	2	3	4	Total
Dukes	3	3	0	8	14
Rainbow Warriors	7	7	0	10	24

at Clarence T. C. Ching Athletics Complex, Honolulu, HI

- Date: September 17, 2022
- Game time: 12:00 a.m. EST
- Game attendance: 8,991
- Referee: Cal McNeill
- TV announcers (Spectrum PPV): Kanoa Leahey (play-by-play), Rich Miano (analyst), Scott Robbs (sideline)

=== At Stonehill ===
	1	2	3	4	Total
Dukes	10	7	3	0	20
Skyhawks	3	7	7	7	24

=== Merrimack ===
	1	2	3	4	Total
Warriors	0	14	14	0	28
Dukes	7	7	7	0	21

=== At Central Connecticut ===
	1	2	3	4	Total
Dukes	3	10	0	17	30
Blue Devils	0	0	6	0	6

=== LIU ===
	1	2	3	4	OT	2OT	Total
Sharks	0	7	28	0	7	8	50
Dukes	7	7	7	14	7	6	48

=== Sacred Heart ===
	1	2	3	4	OT	Total
Pioneers	7	7	7	7	0	28
Dukes	7	7	7	7	7	35

=== At Saint Francis (PA) ===
	1	2	3	4	Total
Dukes	0	0	14	0	14
Red Flash	16	14	14	7	51

=== Wagner ===
	1	2	3	4	Total
Seahawks	0	0	0	0	0
Dukes	7	17	9	0	33
