= NCAA Division I FBS independent schools =

Independent US college football programs

FBS independents
- Association: NCAA
- Founded: 1978; 48 years ago
- Sports fielded: 1; men's: 1
- Division: Division I
- Subdivision: FBS
- No. of teams: 2
- Region: Eastern United States; Midwestern United States
- Website: ncaa.com/independents

NCAA Division I FBS independent schools are four-year institutions whose football programs that compete as "independents" at the NCAA Division I Football Bowl Subdivision (FBS) level. As independents, they are not members of an athletic conference and are not required to play games against a specified set of conference schools.

There are fewer independent schools than in years past; many independent schools join, or attempt to join, established conferences. The main reasons to join a conference are to gain a share of television revenue and access to bowl games that agree to take teams from certain conferences, and to help deal with otherwise potentially difficult challenges in scheduling opponents to play throughout the season.

All Division I FBS independents are eligible for the College Football Playoff (CFP), and are currently eligible to receive a bye to the quarterfinals of the playoff after automatic bids for the top ranked conference champions were removed following the 2024 season.

Independents historically had eligibility for the so-called "access bowls" (the New Year's Six bowls that issue at-large bids: Cotton, Peach, and Fiesta), if they were chosen by the CFP selection committee. Notre Dame also had a potential tie-in with the Orange Bowl, along with other bowls via its affiliation with the Atlantic Coast Conference (ACC). Historically, Notre Dame had similar agreements with its previous conference, the Big East.

The ranks of football independents increased by one starting with the 2011 season with the announcement that BYU would leave the Mountain West Conference (MW) to become a football independent starting with that season. The ranks increased by two in 2013 when the Western Athletic Conference (WAC) dropped football and New Mexico State and Idaho did not have a conference for football. The ranks of football independents decreased by two in 2014 with the return of Idaho and New Mexico State as football-only members of the Sun Belt Conference (SBC) and decreased by one more in 2015 with Navy joining the American Athletic Conference (The American) as a football-only member. UMass became an FBS independent in 2016. Two further teams joined the ranks of FBS independents for the 2018 season: New Mexico State, whose membership in the Sun Belt Conference was not extended beyond the 2017 season, and Liberty, which transitioned from the Big South Conference of the Football Championship Subdivision in 2018. The UConn Huskies became an FBS independent team in 2020.

The most recent changes to the independent ranks came in 2023 when BYU joined the Big 12 Conference, and Liberty and New Mexico State joined Conference USA. A year later, Army joined Navy as a football-only member of The American. In 2025, UMass became a full member of the Mid-American Conference.

== FBS independents ==
Institution	Location	Founded	First	Type	Enrollment (fall 2023)	Endowment (millions – FY24)	Nickname	Colors	Primary conference
University of Connecticut	Storrs, Connecticut	1881	1896	Public	27,364	$634	Huskies		Big East
University of Notre Dame	Notre Dame, Indiana	1842	1887	Private (Catholic)	13,174	$17,897	Fighting Irish		ACC (Note: Notre Dame is officially an independent football team. However, as part of the agreement to join the ACC in other sports, Notre Dame agreed to schedule 5 games per year against ACC opponents. In 2020, after several games against non-ACC schools were cancelled, Notre Dame opted to play a full ACC schedule for that one pandemic-disrupted season. That season, the Fighting Irish were eligible for the conference championship game and for the ACC's Orange Bowl bid.)

== Reasons for independence ==
In recent years, most independent FBS schools have joined a conference for two primary reasons: a guaranteed share of television and bowl revenues and ease of scheduling.

In addition it may be possible that a new school leaves, is forced out from a conference, or has reclassified themselves from a different NCAA division and are not able to join a new conference immediately after entering the FBS thus forcing them to be an independent school.

=== Notre Dame ===
Notre Dame unsuccessfully attempted on three occasions to join an athletic conference in the early 20th century, including the Big Ten in 1926 but was turned down in part due to anti-Catholicism. Notre Dame is now one of the most prominent programs in the country. Because of its national popularity built over several decades, Notre Dame was the only independent program to be part of the Bowl Championship Series coalition and its guaranteed payout. These factors help make Notre Dame one of the most financially valuable football programs in the country, thus negating the need for Notre Dame to secure revenue by joining a conference.

Previously, Notre Dame had filled its annual schedule without needing conference games to do so. It had longstanding rivalries with many different programs around the country, many under long-term contracts, including annual rivalry games with USC, Navy, Michigan, Stanford, Michigan State, Boston College, Purdue, and Pitt. All Notre Dame home games and most away games are on national television, so other teams have a large financial incentive to schedule the university. Nonetheless, Notre Dame joined the ACC in 2013 for all sports except football and men's ice hockey (the only other ACC member with a men's ice hockey varsity team is Boston College, which played alongside Notre Dame in Hockey East until 2017 when Notre Dame switched to the Big Ten). As part of this agreement, Notre Dame plays five of its football games each season against ACC members. This arrangement required Notre Dame to eliminate or reduce the frequency of several rivalries: the Michigan, Michigan State, and Purdue series were canceled (with a renewal of the latter in 2024), while Boston College and Pitt, ACC members themselves, now play Notre Dame every three or four years. On the other hand, the move has allowed Notre Dame to resume old rivalries with ACC members Georgia Tech and Miami, while still scheduling Big Ten opponents from time to time. Due to many historic rivalries with ACC teams, most fans remain unaware of this, as scheduling changes turned out to be small.

In 2020, after several non-ACC games were canceled due to the COVID-19 pandemic, Notre Dame opted to play a full ACC football schedule for just the 2020 season. The Irish were eligible for the conference championship game (which they lost to Clemson) and the conference's automatic bowl bids. Notre Dame's football program returned to independence in 2021, with its schedule including the usual five games against ACC schools.

=== University of Connecticut ===
The University of Connecticut was a founding member of the original Big East Conference in 1979, but that conference split along football lines in 2013. As noted previously, Notre Dame remained an FBS independent but placed its other sports in the ACC, and Pittsburgh and Syracuse followed Notre Dame into the ACC, also joining ACC football. The seven members without FBS football teams left to form a new non-football Big East Conference, while the remaining FBS schools (among them UConn) joined with several new members to reorganize the Big East corporate entity as the American Athletic Conference (which would lose Louisville to the ACC and Rutgers to the Big Ten a year later).

In the years after the split, UConn's flagship men's and women's basketball programs faced significant issues. Jim Calhoun, the coach who had largely built the UConn men into a national powerhouse, had retired after the 2011–12 season. While his successor Kevin Ollie had led the Huskies to a national title in the first season after the split, the team faded noticeably in later seasons, and Ollie was fired after the 2017–18 season amid an NCAA investigation. Ollie's final season saw UConn men's attendance reach its lowest level in 30 years. The women faced a severe lack of competition in The American. In their seven seasons in that league, the Huskies went unbeaten in conference play, both in the regular season and the conference tournament, with all but two of their 139 conference wins being by double-digit margins.

The Huskies received and accepted an invitation to join the reconfigured Big East in 2019, with a July 2020 entry date. Due to the Big East not sponsoring football, UConn was willing to stay in The American as a football-only member. After leaving the conference in all other sports, the American Athletic Conference was unwilling to allow UConn to remain as a football-only member, leading to UConn's independence in football beginning in 2020.

UConn opted not to field a team in 2020 due to the COVID-19 pandemic and the resulting disruption to college football schedules. Specifically, as many other programs moved to conference-only schedules due to the pandemic, several of UConn's scheduled matches were canceled, and the program's status as an independent made it very difficult to schedule replacement games.

== Independent school stadiums ==
School	Football stadium	Capacity
Notre Dame	Notre Dame Stadium	80,795
UConn	Pratt & Whitney Stadium at Rentschler Field	38,066

== Television rights ==
=== University of Notre Dame ===
Since 1991, Notre Dame home games have aired on NBC, and since 2021, are also simulcast on NBCUniversal's streaming service, Peacock. In February 1990, Notre Dame broke away from the College Football Association, which Notre Dame was a part of since 1976, and signed a 5-year contract worth $38 million with NBC that began in 1991. The last regular season Notre Dame home game to be televised outside of NBC was against Penn State on ESPN in 1990.

One Notre Dame home game exclusively streams on Peacock since 2021, which was a home opener against Toledo. Previously, some Fighting Irish home games aired on the now-defunct NBCSN, and in 2020, which Notre Dame was a temporary football member of the Atlantic Coast Conference, the home opener against South Florida aired on USA Network. A portion of the game against Clemson aired on USA Network due to NBC News' coverage of Joe Biden's victory speech, before returning to NBC for the remainder of the game. Some home games can be moved to CNBC in case of an overrun into Big Ten Saturday Night, similar to Fox Business occasionally being an overflow channel for some Fox College Football telecasts in the event of programming conflicts.

=== University of Connecticut ===
Since 2021, UConn home games have aired on CBS Sports Network. The deal between CBS and UConn was made in 2020, initially only including four home games, with all home games televised from 2021 to 2023, but their season was cancelled due to the COVID-19 pandemic, therefore starting in 2021 against Holy Cross, and the final season being in 2024, although all but one home game continued to air on CBS Sports Network during the 2025 season with no announcement of a deal extension or new agreement. No home game has aired on the CBS network during their deal.

In 2022, UConn's home opener against Central Connecticut was televised on The CW affiliate WCCT-TV and streaming on WTIC-TV's streaming app, FOX61+. The following year, UConn's athletic department announced a partnership with Hartford-licensed CBS affiliate WFSB and sister independent station WWAX-LD. The 2023 home finale against Sacred Heart and the 2024 home opener against Merrimack were televised on WFSB, and streaming for free on UConn's streaming service, UConn+.

== List of current and past independent schools ==
The following is an incomplete list of teams which have been Division I-A (FBS) Independents since the formation of Division I-A in 1978. School names reflect those in current use by their athletic programs, which may not reflect names used when those schools were independents. Conference alignments reflect those in place for the 2025 season.

From	To	Team	Previous conference	Conference joined	Current conference
1978	1979	Air Force	Division I Independent	WAC (1980–1998)	Mountain West (1999–present)
1987	1991	Akron	OVC	MAC (1992–present)	
1992	1992	Arkansas State	Division I-AA independent	Big West (1993–1995)	
1996	1998	Arkansas State	Big West (1993–1995)	Big West (1999–2000)	Sun Belt (2001–present)
1978	1997	Army	Division I independent	CUSA (1998–2004)	
2005	2023	Army	CUSA (1998–2004)	American (2024–present)	
1978	1990	Boston College	Division I independent	Big East (1991–2004)	ACC (2005–present)
2011	2022	BYU	Mountain West (1999–2010)	Big 12 (2023–present)	
1978	1995	Cincinnati	Division I independent	CUSA (1996–2004)	Big 12 (2023–present)
1978	1981	Colgate	Division I independent	Division I-AA independent (1982–1985)	Patriot League (1986–present)
1978	1996	East Carolina	Division I independent	CUSA (1997–2013)	American (2014–present)
1978	1991	Florida State	Division I independent	ACC (1992–present)	
2004		Florida A&M	MEAC	Division I-AA independent (2004)	MEAC (2005–present)
1978	1982	Georgia Tech	Division I independent	ACC (1983–present)	
1978		Hawaii	Division I independent	WAC (1979–2011)	Mountain West (2012–present)
1978	1981	Holy Cross	Division I independent	Division I-AA independent (1982–1985)	Patriot League (1986–present)
2013		Idaho	WAC (2005–2012)	Sun Belt (2014–2017)	Big Sky (2018–present)
1978	1980	Illinois State	Division I independent	MVC (1981–1984)	MVFC (1985–present) (Note: In 1985, the Gateway Collegiate Athletic Conference, a women's sports conference parallel to the Missouri Valley Conference, added football as its only men's sport by taking in the MVC's I-AA football teams. In 1992, the women's portion of the Gateway merged with the MVC; the football conference kept the Gateway charter, changing the conference name to Gateway Football Conference. The current name was adopted in 2008.)
1978	1981	Indiana State	Division I independent	Division I-AA independent (1982–1985)	MVFC (1986–present)
2018	2022	Liberty	Big South (2002–2017)	CUSA (2023–present)	
1982	1992	Louisiana	Southland Conference	Big West (1993–1995)	Sun Belt (2001–present)
1996	2000	Louisiana	Big West (1993–1995)	Sun Belt (2001–present)	
1989	1992	Louisiana Tech	Division I-AA independent	Big West (1993–1995)	
1996	2000	Louisiana Tech	Big West (1993–1995)	WAC (2001–2012)	CUSA (2013–present)
1978	1981	Louisiana–Monroe	Division I independent	Southland (1982-1993)	
1994	2000	Louisiana–Monroe	Southland (1982-1993)	Sun Belt (2001–present)	
1978	1995	Louisville	Division I independent	CUSA (1996–2004)	ACC (2014–present)
1978	1995	Memphis	Division I independent	CUSA (1996–2012)	American (2013–present)
1978	1990	Miami (FL)	Division I independent	Big East (1991–2003)	ACC (2004–present)
1999	2000	Middle Tennessee	OVC	Sun Belt (2001–2012)	CUSA (2013–present)
1978	2014	Navy	Division I independent	American (2015–present)	
2013		New Mexico State	WAC (2005–2012)	Sun Belt (2014–2017)	
2018	2022	New Mexico State	Sun Belt (2014–2017)	CUSA (2023–present)	
1978	1982	North Texas	Division I independent	Southland (1983–1994)	
1995		North Texas	Southland (1983–1994)	Big West (1996–2000)	American (2023–present)
1987	1992	Northern Illinois	MAC	Big West (1993–1995)	
1996		Northern Illinois	Big West (1993–1995)	MAC (1997–present)	
1978	2019	Notre Dame	Division I independent	ACC (2020 only)†	
2021	present	Notre Dame	ACC (2020 only)†		
1978	1992	Penn State	Division I independent	Big Ten (1993–present)	
1978	1990	Pittsburgh	Division I independent	Big East (1991–2012)	ACC (2013–present)
1978	1981	Richmond	Division I independent	Division I-AA Independent (1982–1983)	Patriot League (2025–present)
1978	1990	Rutgers	Division I independent	Big East/American (1991–2013) (Note: Rutgers remained in the American Athletic Conference for the 2013 season before leaving for the Big Ten Conference in 2014.)	Big Ten (2014–present)
1978	1991	South Carolina	Division I independent	SEC (1992–present)	
2001	2002	South Florida	Division I-AA independent	CUSA (2003–2004)	Big East/American (2005–present) (Note: This school remained in the conference that includes the FBS members of the pre-2013 Big East Conference, which began operating as the American Athletic Conference in July 2013.)
1978	1995	Southern Miss	Division I independent	CUSA (1996–2021)	Sun Belt (2022–present)
1978	1990	Syracuse	Division I independent	Big East (1991–2012)	ACC (2013–present)
1978	1990	Temple	Division I independent	Big East (1991–2004)	
2005	2006	Temple	Big East (1991–2004)	MAC (2007–2011)	Big East/American (2012–present)
2002	2003	Troy	Division I-AA independent	Sun Belt (2004–present)	
1978	1995	Tulane	Division I independent	CUSA (1996–2013)	American (2014–present)
1986	1995	Tulsa	MVC	WAC (1996–2004)	American (2014–present)
1996	1998	UAB	Division I-AA independent	CUSA (1999–2014, 2017–2022) (Note: UAB dropped football after the 2014 season, but reinstated the sport for 2017 and beyond. The school remained a CUSA member throughout.)	American (2023–present)
1996	2001	UCF	Division I-AA independent	MAC (2002–2004)	Big 12 (2023–present)
2000	2003	UConn	Atlantic 10 (1997–1999)	Big East (2004–2012)	
2020	present	UConn	American (2013–2019)		
2016	2024	UMass	Mid-American (2012–2015)	Mid-American (2025–present)	
1978	1981	UNLV	Division II independent	Big West (1982–1995)	Mountain West (1999–present)
2001	2002	Utah State	Big West	Sun Belt (2003–2004)	Mountain West (2013–present)
1978	1980	Villanova	Division I independent	Dropped football	CAA Football (1985–present)
1978	1990	Virginia Tech	Division I independent	Big East (1991–2003)	ACC (2004–present)
1978	1990	West Virginia	Division I independent	Big East (1991–2011)	Big 12 (2012–present)
2008		Western Kentucky	Gateway Football Conference	Sun Belt (2009–2013)	CUSA (2014–present)
1986		Wichita State	MVC	Dropped football	
1978	1981	William & Mary	Division I independent	Division I-AA independent (1982-1992)	CAA Football (2007–present)

† Notre Dame played an ACC schedule in 2020 only due to the COVID-19 pandemic; resumed playing as an Independent in 2021

== See also ==
- NCAA Division I FCS independent schools
- NCAA Division I independent schools
- NCAA Division II independent schools
- NCAA Division III independent schools
- NAIA independent schools
