= Eli Gardner =

American football coach (born 1986)

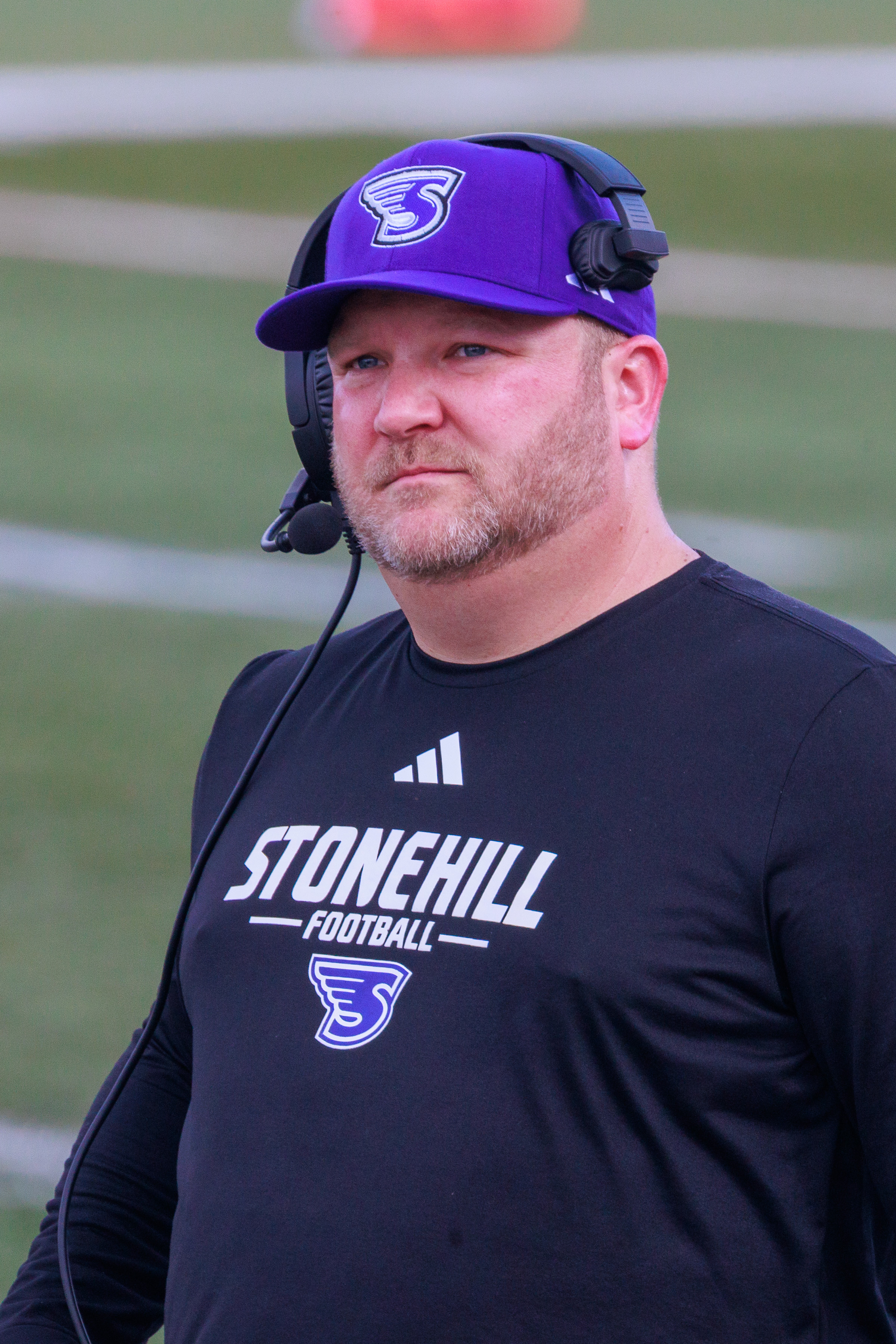
- Gardner in 2025

Current position
- Title: Head coach
- Team: Stonehill
- Conference: NEC
- Record: 41–53

Biographical details
- Born: June 14, 1986 (age 40)

Playing career
- 2004–2007: Western New England
- Position: Linebacker

Coaching career (HC unless noted)
- 2008: Western New England (DL)
- 2009–2010: Stonehill (ST/LB)
- 2011–2013: Stonehill (DC)
- 2014–2015: Stonehill (AHC/DC)
- 2016–present: Stonehill

Head coaching record
- Overall: 41–53

Eli Gardner (born June 14, 1986) is an American football coach who is currently the head coach at Stonehill College, a role he has held since the 2016 season. He played college football at Western New England University.

== Early life ==
Gardner is a native of Milford, New Jersey. He earned a bachelor's degree in sports management at Western New England University, and a master's degree in athletic administration from Endicott College.

== Head coaching record ==
| Year | Team | Overall | Conference | Standing | Bowl/playoffs |
|---|---|---|---|---|---|
Stonehill Skyhawks (Northeast-10 Conference) (2016–2021)
| 2016 | Stonehill | 5–6 | 4–5 | 6th | |
| 2017 | Stonehill | 6–4 | 5–4 | T–4th | |
| 2018 | Stonehill | 2–8 | 2–7 | 8th | |
| 2019 | Stonehill | 6–4 | 5–3 | T–3rd | |
| 2020–21 | No team—COVID-19 | | | | |
| 2021 | Stonehill | 8–2 | 6–2 | 3rd | |
Stonehill Skyhawks (Northeast Conference) (2022–present)
| 2022 | Stonehill | 4–5 | 2–5 | T–6th | |
| 2023 | Stonehill | 5–5 | 4–3 | T–2nd | |
| 2024 | Stonehill | 1–10 | 0–6 | 7th | |
| 2025 | Stonehill | 4–8 | 3–4 | 6th | |
| 2026 | Stonehill | 0–1 | 0–0 | | |
| Stonehill: | | 41–53 | 31–39 | | |
| Total: | | 41–53 | | | |
