= 2022 Central Connecticut Blue Devils football team =

American college football season

2022 Central Connecticut Blue Devils football
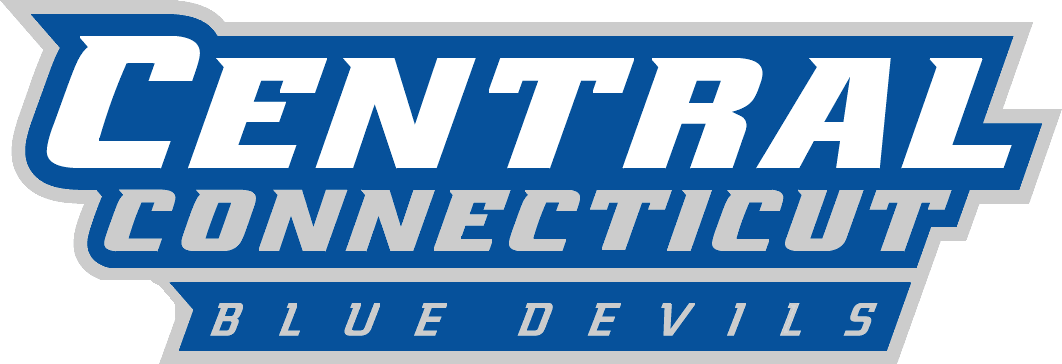
- Conference: Northeast Conference
- Record: 2–9 (2–5 NEC)
- Head coach: Ryan McCarthy (4th season)
- Offensive coordinator: Jeff Ambrosie (4th season)
- Defensive coordinator: Ron DiGravio (4th season)
- Home stadium: Arute Field

2022 Northeast Conference football standings
	Conf.			Overall
Team	W		L	W		L
Saint Francis (PA) $^	7	–	0	9	–	3
Merrimack *	6	–	1	8	–	3
LIU	4	–	3	4	–	7
Duquesne	3	–	4	4	–	7
Sacred Heart	3	–	4	5	–	6
Central Connecticut	2	–	5	2	–	9
Stonehill *	2	–	5	4	–	5
Wagner	1	–	6	1	–	10
$ – Conference champion; ^ – FCS playoff participant; Note: Merrimack and Stonehill ineligible for NEC title and FCS postseason play due to transition from NCAA Division II; Rankings from STATS Poll

The 2022 Central Connecticut Blue Devils football team represented Central Connecticut State University as a member of the Northeast Conference (NEC) during the 2022 NCAA Division I FCS football season. The Blue Devils, led by fourth-year head coach Ryan McCarthy, played their home games at Arute Field.

== Schedule ==
Date	Time	Opponent	Site	TV	Result	Attendance
September 3	12:00 p.m.	at UConn*	Pratt & Whitney Stadium at Rentschler Field; East Hartford, CT	CW20, FOX61+	L 3–28	22,442
September 10	6:00 p.m.	Sacred Heart	Arute Field; New Britain, CT	ESPN3	L 10–14	4,514
September 17	7:00 p.m.	at Southeastern Louisiana*	Strawberry Stadium; Hammond, LA	ESPN+	L 6–70	5,277
September 24	3:30 p.m.	at Albany*	Bob Ford Field at Tom & Mary Casey Stadium; Albany, NY	FloSports	L 26–45	6,111
October 1	12:00 p.m.	at Saint Francis (PA)	DeGol Field; Loretto, PA	NEC Front Row	L 13–39	1,150
October 8	1:00 p.m.	Brown*^{†}	Arute Field; New Britain, CT	NEC Front Row	L 20–27	3,722
October 22	12:00 p.m.	Duquesne	Arute Field; New Britain, CT	NEC Front Row	L 6–30	2,122
October 29	12:00 p.m.	Wagner	Arute Field; New Britain, CT	NEC Front Row	W 34–7	
November 5	1:00 p.m.	at LIU	Bethpage Federal Credit Union Stadium; Brookville, NY	ESPN3	L 20–29	672
November 12	12:00 p.m.	Merrimack	Arute Field; New Britain, CT	NEC Front Row	L 14–20	1,022
November 19	1:00 p.m.	at Stonehill	W.B. Mason Stadium; Easton, MA	NEC Front Row	W 39–14	
*Non-conference game; ^{†}Homecoming; All times are in Eastern time; Source:

== Game summaries ==
=== At UConn ===
Central Connecticut Blue Devils at UConn Huskies – Game summary

Quarter	1	2	3	4	Total
Blue Devils	0	3	0	0	3
Huskies	0	7	7	14	28

at Pratt & Whitney Stadium at Rentschler Field • East Hartford, Connecticut

- Date: September 3
- Game time: 12:05 p.m.
- Game weather: Temperature: 78 °F (26 °C) • Wind: 2 S • Weather: Sunny
- Game attendance: 22,442
- Referee: Stuart Mullins
- TV announcers (CW20): John Fanta (play-by-play), Joe D’Ambrosio (color analyst) and Randy Brochu (sideline)
- Box Score

Game information

Second quarter

- CCSU – Cristiano Rosa 28-yard field goal, 11:32. Blue Devils 3–0. Drive: 6 plays, 30 yards, TOP 01:57
- CONN – Brandon Niemenski 11 yd pass from Zion Turner (Noe Ruelas kick), 6:02. Huskies 7–3. Drive: 11 plays, 80 yards, TOP 05:24

Third quarter

- CONN – Nate Carter 17 yd run (Noe Ruelas kick), 2:55. Huskies 14–3. Drive: 14 plays, 80 yards, TOP 06:10

Fourth quarter

- CONN – Jacob Flynn 10 yd pass from Zion Turner (Noe Ruelas kick), 11:19. Huskies 21–3. Drive: 8 plays, 60 yards, TOP 03:35
- CONN – Victor Rosa 11 yd run (Noe Ruelas kick), 0:36. Huskies 28–3. Drive: 14 plays, 88 yards, TOP 08:25

Top passers

- CONN – Zion Turner – 14/22, 172 yards, 2 TDs
- CCSU – Romelo Williams – 16/30, 164 yards

Top rushers

- CONN – Nate Carter – 23 rushes, 123 yards, 1 TD
- CCSU – Malik Thomas – 5 rushes, 63 yards

Top receivers

- CONN – Aaron Turner – 2 receptions, 57 yards
- CCSU – Kyren Petteway – 6 receptions, 61 yards

Top defense

- CONN – Jackson Mitchell – 7 tackles
- CCSU – Anthony Wynn – 12 tackles

Statistics	UConn	CCSU
First downs	27	14
Total yards	446	242
Rushing yards	274	78
Passing yards	172	164
Turnovers	3	1
Time of possession	34:38	25:22

=== Sacred Heart ===
	1	2	3	4	Total
Pioneers	7	0	0	7	14
Blue Devils	0	3	7	0	10

=== At Southeastern Louisiana ===
Central Connecticut Blue Devils at Southeastern Louisiana Lions

Quarter	1	2	3	4	Total
Blue Devils	0	0	6	0	6
Lions	14	34	10	12	70

at Strawberry Stadium, Hammond, LA

- Date: September 17
- Game time: 7:00 p.m. EST
- Game weather: Sunny
- Game attendance: 5,217
- Referee: Nolan Dumas
- TV: ESPN+

=== At Albany ===
	1	2	3	4	Total
Blue Devils	6	6	8	6	26
Great Danes	14	10	21	0	45

=== At Saint Francis (PA) ===
	1	2	3	4	Total
Blue Devils	0	6	7	0	13
Red Flash	5	14	7	13	39

=== Brown ===
	1	2	3	4	Total
Bears	7	14	3	3	27
Blue Devils	6	7	0	7	20

=== Duquesne ===
	1	2	3	4	Total
Dukes	3	10	0	17	30
Blue Devils	0	0	6	0	6

=== Wagner ===
	1	2	3	4	Total
Seahawks	0	7	0	0	7
Blue Devils	7	21	0	6	34

=== At LIU ===
	1	2	3	4	Total
Blue Devils	7	0	0	13	20
Sharks	13	3	6	7	29

=== Merrimack ===
	1	2	3	4	Total
Warriors	7	0	0	13	20
Blue Devils	7	0	0	7	14

=== At Stonehill ===
	1	2	3	4	Total
Blue Devils	6	6	20	7	39
Skyhawks	7	7	0	0	14
