= 2022 Saint Francis Red Flash football team =

American college football season

2022 Saint Francis Red Flash football

NEC champion

NCAA Division I First Round, L 17–56 vs. Delaware
- Conference: Northeast Conference
- Record: 9–3 (7–0 NEC)
- Head coach: Chris Villarrial (12th season)
- Offensive coordinator: Marco Pecora (3rd season)
- Defensive coordinator: Scott Lewis (2nd season)
- Home stadium: DeGol Field

2022 Northeast Conference football standings
	Conf.			Overall
Team	W		L	W		L
Saint Francis (PA) $^	7	–	0	9	–	3
Merrimack *	6	–	1	8	–	3
LIU	4	–	3	4	–	7
Duquesne	3	–	4	4	–	7
Sacred Heart	3	–	4	5	–	6
Central Connecticut	2	–	5	2	–	9
Stonehill *	2	–	5	4	–	5
Wagner	1	–	6	1	–	10
$ – Conference champion; ^ – FCS playoff participant; Note: Merrimack and Stonehill ineligible for NEC title and FCS postseason play due to transition from NCAA Division II; Rankings from STATS Poll

The 2022 Saint Francis Red Flash football team represented Saint Francis University as a member of the Northeast Conference (NEC) during the 2022 NCAA Division I FCS football season. The Red Flash, led by 12th-year head coach Chris Villarrial, played their home games at DeGol Field.

== Schedule ==
Date	Time	Opponent	Site	TV	Result	Attendance
September 1	6:00 p.m.	at Akron*	InfoCision Stadium–Summa Field; Akron, OH	ESPN3	L 23–30 ^{OT}	8,752
September 10	5:30 p.m.	at Richmond*	E. Claiborne Robins Stadium; Richmond, VA	FloSports	L 21–31	6,388
September 17	4:00 p.m.	at Wagner	Wagner College Stadium; Staten Island, NY	NEC Front Row	W 27–7	2,570
September 24	2:00 p.m.	at Norfolk State*	William "Dick" Price Stadium; Norfolk, VA	ESPN+	W 45–26	3,835
October 1	12:00 p.m.	Central Connecticut	DeGol Field; Loretto, PA	NEC Front Row	W 39–13	1,150
October 15	12:00 p.m.	at LIU	Bethpage Federal Credit Union Stadium; Brookville, NY	NEC Front Row	W 57–7	5,116
October 22	1:00 p.m.	Stonehill^{†}	DeGol Field; Loretto, PA	ESPN3	W 17–13	2,026
October 29	12:00 p.m.	at Sacred Heart	Campus Field; Fairfield, CT	ESPN3	W 44–14	4,253
November 5	12:30 p.m.	at Georgetown*	Cooper Field; Washington, D.C.	ESPN+	W 38–24	1,487
November 12	12:00 p.m.	Duquesne	DeGol Field; Loretto, PA	NEC Front Row	W 51–14	1,251
November 19	12:00 p.m.	at Merrimack	Duane Stadium; North Andover, MA	ESPN3	W 52–23	3,361
November 26	2:00 p.m.	at No. 23 Delaware*	Delaware Stadium; Newark, DE (NCAA Division I First Round)	ESPN+	L 17–56	4,629
*Non-conference game; ^{†}Homecoming; Rankings from STATS Poll released prior to the game; All times are in Eastern time

== Game summaries ==
=== At Akron ===
Saint Francis Red Flash at Akron Zips

Team	1	2	3	4	OT	Total
Red Flash	3	10	3	7	0	23
• Zips	3	7	7	6	7	30

- Date: September 1, 2022
- Location: InfoCision Stadium–Summa Field
  Akron, OH
- Game start: 6:00 p.m. EST
- Elapsed time: 4 hours and 35 minutes
- Game attendance: 8,752
- Game weather: Sunny, 82 °F (28 °C)
- Referee: Matt Packowski
- TV announcers (ESPN3): Michael Reghi (play by play) Adam Breneman (analyst)

Statistics	Saint Francis	Akron
First downs	18	19
Total yards	453	384
Rushing yards	189	98
Passing yards	264	286
Turnovers	1	0
Time of possession	32:46	27:14

Team	Category	Player	Statistics
Saint Francis	Passing	Justin Sliwoski	11/17, 162 yards, 1 INT
Saint Francis	Rushing	Damon Horton	18 carries, 86 yards, 1 TD
Saint Francis	Receiving	Dawson Snyder	3 receptions, 92 yards
Akron	Passing	DJ Irons	22/37, 286 yards, 2 TD
Akron	Rushing	Cam Wiley	21 carries, 84 yards, 2 TD
Akron	Receiving	Shocky Jacques-Louis	8 receptions, 122 yards, 1 TD

=== At Richmond ===
	1	2	3	4	Total
Red Flash	6	7	0	8	21
Spiders	0	14	3	14	31

=== At Wagner ===
	1	2	3	4	Total
Red Flash	7	7	10	3	27
Seahawks	7	0	0	0	7

=== At Norfolk State ===
	1	2	3	4	Total
Red Flash	21	14	0	10	45
Spartans	0	12	7	7	26

=== Central Connecticut ===
	1	2	3	4	Total
Blue Devils	0	6	7	0	13
Red Flash	5	14	7	13	39

=== At LIU ===
	1	2	3	4	Total
Red Flash	7	16	17	17	57
Sharks	7	0	0	0	7

=== Stonehill ===
	1	2	3	4	Total
Skyhawks	3	3	7	0	13
Red Flash	14	0	3	0	17

=== At Sacred Heart ===
	1	2	3	4	Total
Red Flash	13	21	0	10	44
Pioneers	0	7	7	0	14

=== At Georgetown ===
	1	2	3	4	Total
Red Flash	0	14	24	0	38
Hoyas	14	7	0	3	24

=== Duquesne ===
	1	2	3	4	Total
Dukes	0	0	14	0	14
Red Flash	16	14	14	7	51

=== At Merrimack ===
	1	2	3	4	Total
Red Flash	14	24	14	0	52
Warriors	0	7	0	16	23

== FCS Playoffs ==
=== At No. 23 Delaware – First Round ===
	1	2	3	4	Total
Red Flash	3	0	7	7	17
No. 23 Fightin' Blue Hens	14	14	7	21	56
