= 2022 LIU Sharks football team =

American college football season

2022 LIU Sharks football
- Conference: Northeast Conference
- Record: 4–7 (4–3 NEC)
- Head coach: Ron Cooper (1st season)
- Co-offensive coordinators: John Roberts (1st season); Kort Shankweiler (1st season)
- Defensive coordinator: Kevin Cosgrove (1st season)
- Home stadium: Bethpage Federal Credit Union Stadium

2022 Northeast Conference football standings
	Conf.			Overall
Team	W		L	W		L
Saint Francis (PA) $^	7	–	0	9	–	3
Merrimack *	6	–	1	8	–	3
LIU	4	–	3	4	–	7
Duquesne	3	–	4	4	–	7
Sacred Heart	3	–	4	5	–	6
Central Connecticut	2	–	5	2	–	9
Stonehill *	2	–	5	4	–	5
Wagner	1	–	6	1	–	10
$ – Conference champion; ^ – FCS playoff participant; Note: Merrimack and Stonehill ineligible for NEC title and FCS postseason play due to transition from NCAA Division II; Rankings from STATS Poll

The 2022 LIU Sharks football team represented both the LIU Post and LIU Brooklyn campuses of Long Island University as a member of the Northeast Conference (NEC) during the 2022 NCAA Division I FCS football season. The Sharks, led by first-year head coach Ron Cooper, played their home games at Bethpage Federal Credit Union Stadium.

== Schedule ==
Date	Time	Opponent	Site	TV	Result	Attendance
September 1	7:00 p.m.	at Toledo*	Glass Bowl; Toledo, OH	ESPN3	L 0–37	21,291
September 10	1:00 p.m.	No. 6 Villanova*	Bethpage Federal Credit Union Stadium; Brookville, NY	NEC Front Row	L 21–38	4,812
September 17	12:00 p.m.	at Kent State*	Dix Stadium; Kent, OH	ESPN3	L 10–63	15,452
September 24	1:00 p.m.	Bryant*	Bethpage Federal Credit Union Stadium; Brookville, NY	NEC Front Row	L 29–31	1,134
October 1	1:00 p.m.	at Merrimack	Duane Stadium; North Andover, MA	NEC Front Row	L 23–24	12,622
October 15	1:00 p.m.	Saint Francis (PA)^{†}	Bethpage Federal Credit Union Stadium; Brookville, NY	NEC Front Row	L 7–57	5,116
October 21	7:00 p.m.	at Wagner	Wagner College Stadium; Staten Island, NY	ESPN3	L 26–37	998
October 29	12:00 p.m.	at Duquesne	Arthur J. Rooney Athletic Field; Pittsburgh, PA	NEC Front Row	W 50–48 ^{2OT}	818
November 5	1:00 p.m.	Central Connecticut	Bethpage Federal Credit Union Stadium; Brookville, NY	ESPN3	W 29–20	672
November 12	1:00 p.m.	Stonehill	Bethpage Federal Credit Union Stadium; Brookville, NY	NEC Front Row	W 34–28	532
November 19	12:00 p.m.	at Sacred Heart	Campus Field; Farfield, CT	NEC Front Row	W 37–34	4,763
*Non-conference game; ^{†}Homecoming; Rankings from STATS Poll released prior to the game; All times are in Eastern time

== Game summaries ==
=== At Toledo ===
	1	2	3	4	Total
Sharks	0	0	0	0	0
Rockets	3	17	0	17	37

=== No. 6 Villanova ===
	1	2	3	4	Total
No. 6 Wildcats	3	14	14	7	38
Sharks	0	7	0	14	21

=== At Kent State ===
	1	2	3	4	Total
Sharks	7	3	0	0	10
Golden Flashes	7	28	14	14	63

=== Bryant ===
	1	2	3	4	Total
Bulldogs	14	7	7	3	31
Sharks	7	6	7	9	29

=== At Merrimack ===
	1	2	3	4	Total
Sharks	3	17	3	0	23
Warriors	3	7	0	14	24

=== Saint Francis (PA) ===
	1	2	3	4	Total
Red Flash	7	16	17	17	57
Sharks	7	0	0	0	7

=== At Wagner ===
	1	2	3	4	Total
Sharks	0	16	3	7	26
Seahawks	7	17	6	7	37

=== At Duquesne ===
	1	2	3	4	OT	2OT	Total
Sharks	0	7	28	0	7	8	50
Dukes	7	7	7	14	7	6	48

=== Central Connecticut ===
	1	2	3	4	Total
Blue Devils	7	0	0	13	20
Sharks	13	3	6	7	29

=== Stonehill ===
	1	2	3	4	Total
Skyhawks	0	7	7	14	28
Sharks	14	13	0	7	34

=== At Sacred Heart ===
	1	2	3	4	Total
Sharks	7	14	16	0	37
Pioneers	0	10	7	17	34
