= 2022 Sacred Heart Pioneers football team =

American college football season

2022 Sacred Heart Pioneers football
- Conference: Northeast Conference
- Record: 5–6 (3–4 NEC)
- Head coach: Mark Nofri (11th season)
- Offensive coordinator: Matt Gardner (6th season)
- Defensive coordinator: Mike Cooke (6th season)
- Home stadium: Campus Field

2022 Northeast Conference football standings
	Conf.			Overall
Team	W		L	W		L
Saint Francis (PA) $^	7	–	0	9	–	3
Merrimack *	6	–	1	8	–	3
LIU	4	–	3	4	–	7
Duquesne	3	–	4	4	–	7
Sacred Heart	3	–	4	5	–	6
Central Connecticut	2	–	5	2	–	9
Stonehill *	2	–	5	4	–	5
Wagner	1	–	6	1	–	10
$ – Conference champion; ^ – FCS playoff participant; Note: Merrimack and Stonehill ineligible for NEC title and FCS postseason play due to transition from NCAA Division II; Rankings from STATS Poll

The 2022 Sacred Heart Pioneers football team represented Sacred Heart University as a member of the Northeast Conference (NEC) during the 2022 NCAA Division I FCS football season. Led by 11th-year head coach Mark Nofri, the Pioneers compiled an overall record of 5–6 with a mark of 3–4 in conference play, tying for fourth place in the NEC. Sacred Heart played home games at Campus Field in Fairfield, Connecticut.

== Schedule ==
Date	Time	Opponent	Site	TV	Result	Attendance
September 3	12:30 p.m.	at Lafayette*	Fisher Stadium; Easton, PA	ESPN+	L 0–6	5,255
September 10	6:00 p.m.	at Central Connecticut	Arute Field; New Britain, CT	ESPN3	W 14–10	4,514
September 17	12:00 p.m.	at Morgan State*	Hughes Stadium; Baltimore, MD	ESPN+	L 9–24	5,347
September 24	2:00 p.m.	Dartmouth*^{†}	Campus Field; Fairfield, CT	NEC Front Row	W 38–31 ^{OT}	6,293
October 1	1:00 p.m.	Norfolk State*	Campus Field; Fairfield, CT	NEC Front Row	W 31–14	
October 15	1:00 p.m.	Stonehill	Campus Field; Fairfield, CT	NEC Front Row	W 40–27	10,153
October 22	1:00 p.m.	at Merrimack	Duane Stadium; North Andover, MA	NEC Front Row	L 25–31	
October 29	12:00 p.m.	Saint Francis (PA)	Campus Field; Fairfield, CT	ESPN3	L 14–44	4,253
November 5	12:00 p.m.	at Duquesne	Arthur J. Rooney Athletic Field; Pittsburgh, PA	NEC Front Row	L 28–35 ^{OT}	
November 12	12:00 p.m.	at Wagner	Wagner College Stadium; Staten Island, NY	NEC Front Row	W 38–28	
November 19	12:00 p.m.	LIU	Campus Field; Fairfield, CT	NEC Front Row	L 34–37	4,763
*Non-conference game; ^{†}Homecoming; All times are in Eastern time

== Game summaries ==
=== At Lafayette ===
	1	2	3	4	Total
Pioneers	0	0	0	0	0
Leopards	0	0	6	0	6

=== At Central Connecticut ===
	1	2	3	4	Total
Pioneers	7	0	0	7	14
Blue Devils	0	3	7	0	10

=== At Morgan State ===
	1	2	3	4	Total
Pioneers	0	2	0	7	9
Bears	3	7	14	0	24

=== Dartmouth ===
	1	2	3	4	OT	Total
Big Green	21	0	10	0	0	31
Pioneers	3	14	7	7	7	38

=== Norfolk State ===
	1	2	3	4	Total
Spartans	7	7	0	0	14
Pioneers	7	10	7	7	31

=== Stonehill ===
	1	2	3	4	Total
Skyhawks	0	7	7	13	27
Pioneers	3	17	14	6	40

=== At Merrimack ===
	1	2	3	4	Total
Pioneers	0	6	19	0	25
Warriors	7	7	14	3	31

=== Saint Francis (PA) ===
	1	2	3	4	Total
Red Flash	13	21	0	10	44
Pioneers	0	7	7	0	14

=== At Duquesne ===
	1	2	3	4	OT	Total
Pioneers	7	7	7	7	0	28
Dukes	7	7	7	7	7	35

=== At Wagner ===
	1	2	3	4	Total
Pioneers	3	7	7	21	38
Seahawks	7	0	6	15	28

=== LIU ===
	1	2	3	4	Total
Sharks	7	14	16	0	37
Pioneers	0	10	7	17	34
