= Stonehill Skyhawks football =

Intercollegiate American football team of Stonehill College

2026 Stonehill Skyhawks football team
- First season: 1988; 38 years ago
- Head coach: Eli Gardner; 9th season, 41–52 (.441)
- Location: Easton, Massachusetts
- Stadium: W. B. Mason Stadium (capacity: 2,400)
- NCAA division: Division I FCS
- Conference: NEC
- Colors: Purple and white
- All-time record: 161–202–3 (.444)

Conference championships
- ECFC: 1989, 1991, 1995 NE10: 2013
- Consensus All-Americans: 3
- Outfitter: Adidas
- Website: Official website

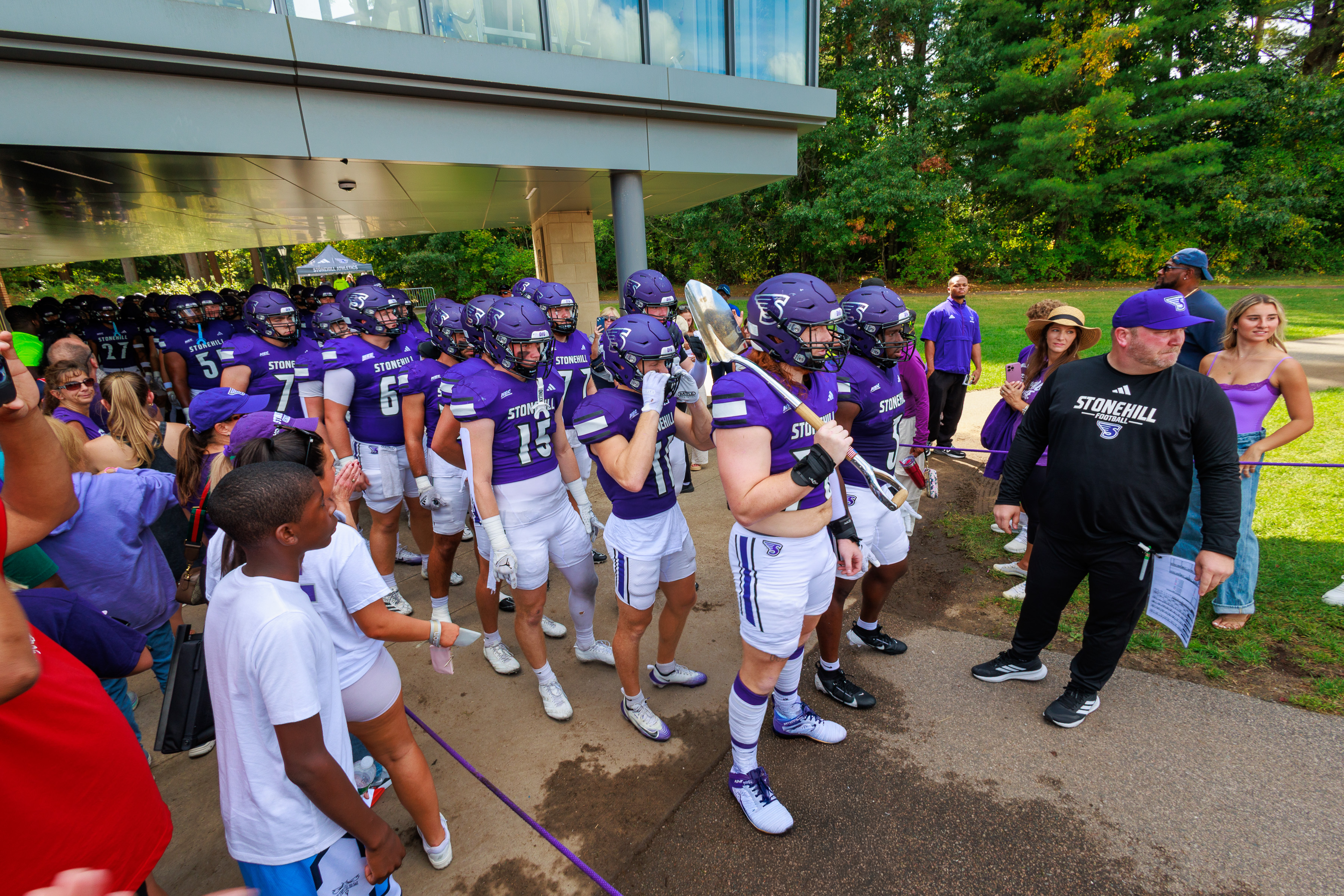
Skyhawks before the game

The Stonehill Skyhawks football team represents Stonehill College in football. Stonehill is a member of the Northeast Conference (NEC). Prior to 2005, Stonehill's athletics teams were known as the Chieftains.

The Skyhawks play on Timothy J. Coughlin Memorial Field at W.B. Mason Stadium, located on Stonehill's campus in Easton, which has a seating capacity of 2,400.

== History ==
On Saturday, September 8, 2012, the Skyhawks defeated Southern Connecticut State University for the first time in 15 years, by a score of 13–0. In addition to breaking the losing streak, Stonehill also became the first team to shut out the Owls in 12 years.

On Thursday, October 18, 2012, Stonehill hosted the University of New Haven Chargers in Stonehill's first ever nationally televised football game, broadcast as part of CBS Sports Network's Thursday night Division II game of the week. The game drew an overcapacity crowd that saw heavily favored New Haven win 45–41 on a last-second touchdown pass.

=== Classifications ===
- 1988–1996: NCAA Division III
- 1997–2021 NCAA Division II
- 2022–present: NCAA Division I FCS

=== Conference memberships ===
- 1988: Independent
- 1989–1996: Eastern Collegiate Football Conference
- 1997–2000: Eastern Football Conference
- 2001–2021: Northeast-10 Conference
- 2022–present: Northeast Conference

== Notable athletes ==
- Nathaniel Robitaille, wide receiver for the Rhein Fire
- Andrew Jamiel, wide receiver for the Orlando Guardians

== Head coaches ==
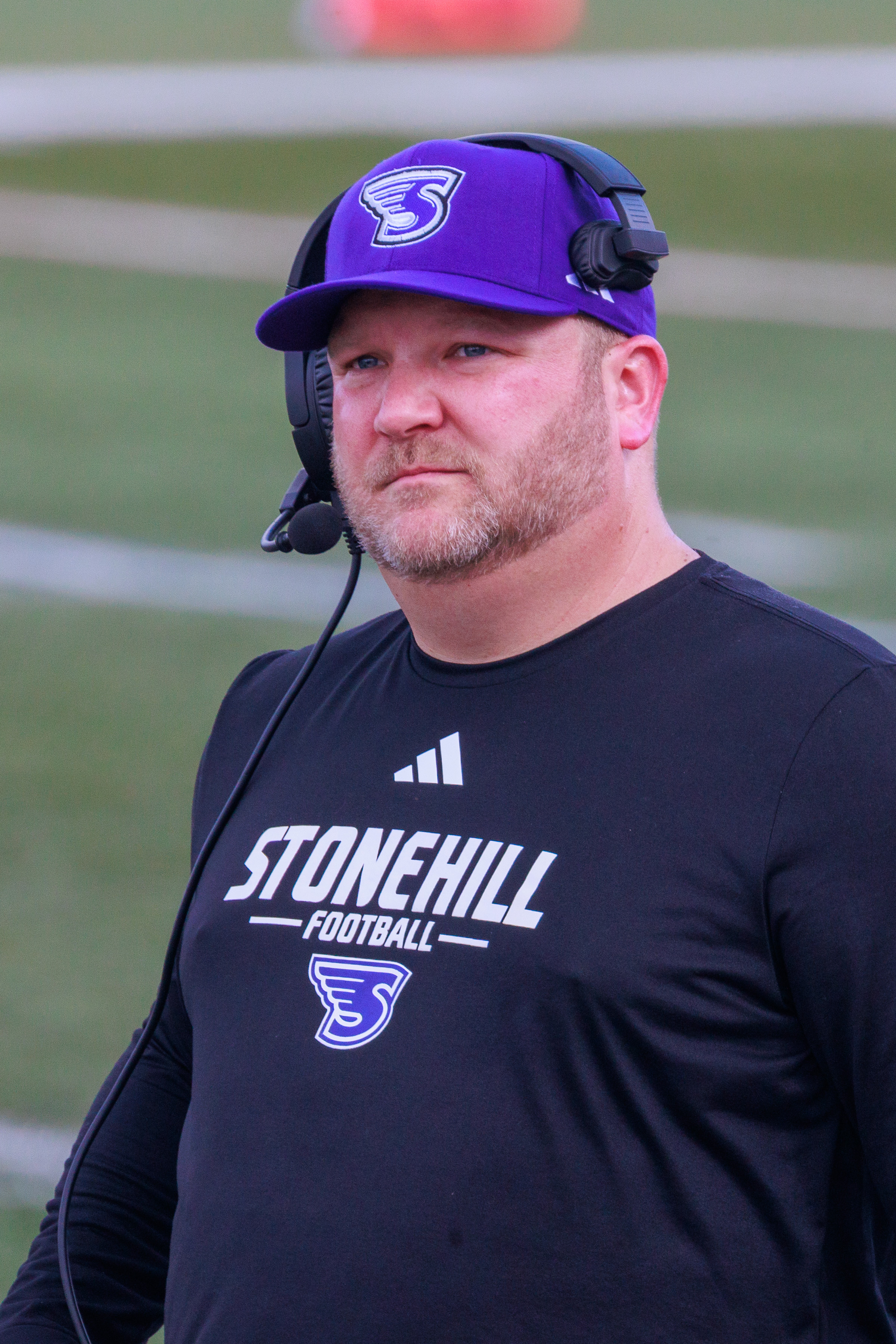
Coach Eli Gardner

Name	Seasons	Record	Win Pct.
Cliff Sherman	1988–1989	6–5–1	0.500
Dave Swanton	1990–1992	14–10–2	0.538
Connie Driscoll	1993–1998	36–24	0.600
Rich Beal	1999–2003	9–44	0.170
Chris Woods	2004–2006	7–22	0.241
Robert Talley	2007–2015	48–46	0.511
Eli Gardner	2016–present	41–52	0.441

== Future non-conference opponents ==
Announced schedules as of April 10, 2026.

2026	2027	2028	2029
Bryant	at Miami (OH)		at Buffalo
at New Hampshire			Maine
at UMass			
at Ohio			
at Sacred Heart			
