= Stonehill Skyhawks =

Intercollegiate athletics teams of Stonehill College

- University: Stonehill College
- Nickname: Skyhawks
- NCAA: Division I (FCS)
- Conference: Northeast Conference (primary); Independent (men's ice hockey); NEWHA (women's ice hockey); NCEA (women's equestrian)
- Athletic director: Dean O'Keefe
- Location: Easton, Massachusetts
- Varsity teams: 23
- Football stadium: W.B. Mason Stadium
- Basketball arena: Merkert Gymnasium
- Ice hockey arena: Bridgewater Ice Arena
- Baseball stadium: Lou Gorman Field
- Softball stadium: Fr. Gartland, C.S.C. Field
- Soccer stadium: Skyhawk Field
- Other venues: Charles Watt Tennis Courts; Foxboro Sports Center
- Colors: Purple and white
- Mascot: Ace the Skyhawk
- Website: stonehillskyhawks.com
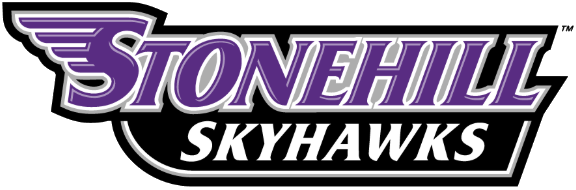

The Stonehill Skyhawks are the intercollegiate athletic teams that represent Stonehill College, located in Easton, Massachusetts, in NCAA sporting competitions. All current Skyhawk athletic teams compete at the Division I level, with most being members of the Northeast Conference (NEC). Stonehill has been a member of the NEC since 2022.

On April 5, 2022, Stonehill announced it was accepting an invitation to join the NEC at the NCAA Division I level, effective in the fall of 2022. Prior to 2022, Stonehill was a founding member of the Northeast-10 Conference in NCAA Division II. After being approved for accelerated reclassification by the NCAA, Stonehill fully moved to Division I for the 2025–26 athletic season.

== History ==
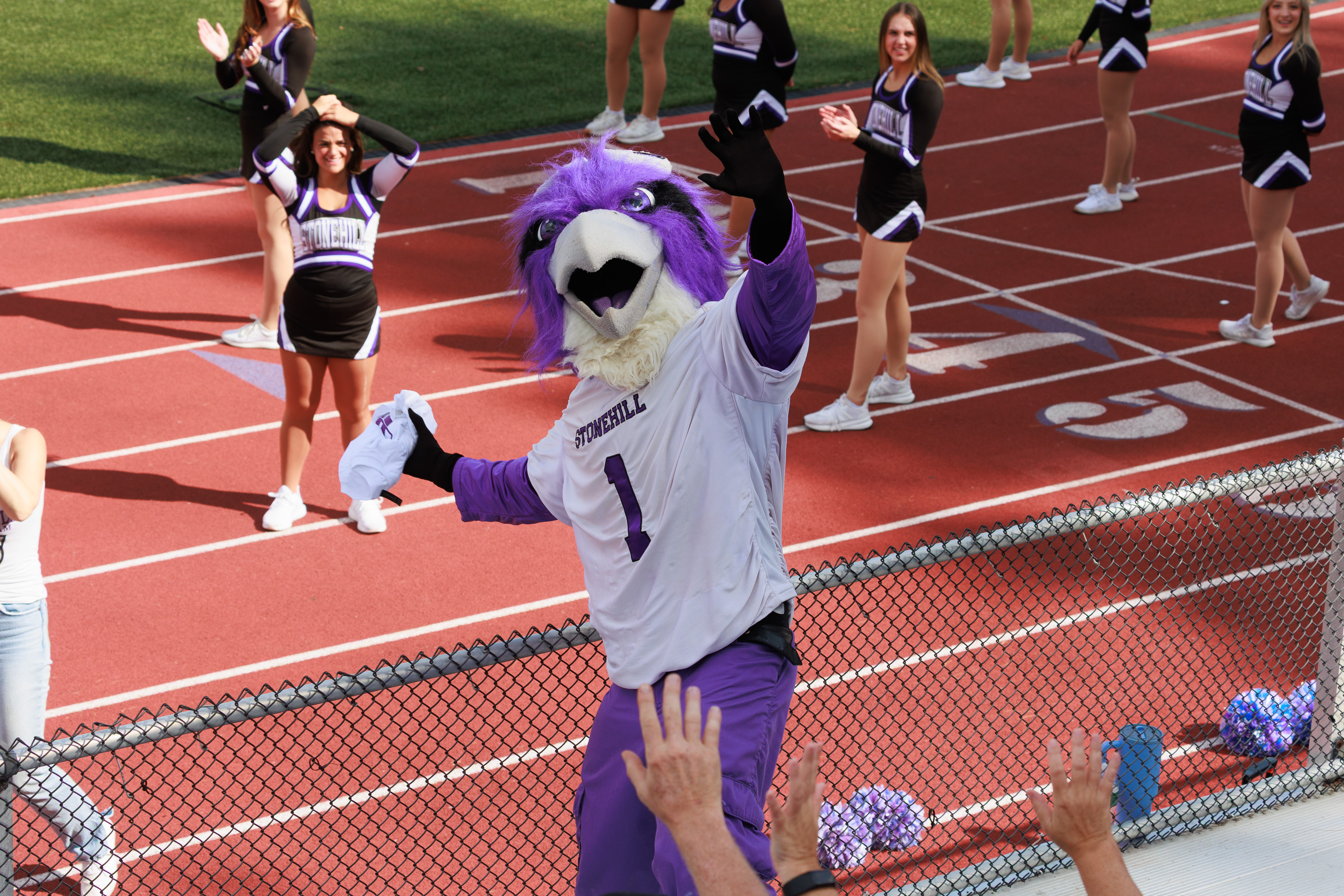
Ace tosses a t-shirt to football spectators

=== Skyhawks nickname ===
In late 2002, The Strategic Planning Committee determined that the previous Stonehill College mascot, the chieftain, was disrespectful to Native Americans and decided that it would be changed. The committee ruled that a new mascot be named as the institution's athletic identity. Therefore, in the following year the college held open forums in which students, alumni, and faculty were asked to submit ideas for the new identity, vote on suggestions, and gauge popularity. Among popular choices were: "Summit"; "Skyhawks"; "Saints"; "Wolfpack"; "Crusaders"; "Mission"; "Shovelmakers"; and "Blizzard".

During the fall semester of the 2005 academic year Stonehill College officially changed the name of its athletic teams to the "Stonehill Skyhawks", with a brand new mascot known as 'Ace', an anthropomorphic purple hawk wearing a scarf, goggles, bomber jacket, and an aviator cap. The actual name 'Skyhawks' is not a reference to either a bird or animal. After the school's property was bought by the Congregation of Holy Cross, the airfield was leased to the Navy during World War II and private companies before and after the war until it was closed in 1955 due to increasing student enrollment. The Navy used the field for training exercises and would employ the Skyhawk aircraft between 1954–1995.

== Sponsored sports ==
Stonehill currently sponsors 23 varsity sports. Most recently, the school has added women's swimming and diving and women's ice hockey as varsity sports. Swimming and diving began in 2020–21 and women's ice hockey will begin in 2022–23. The women's ice hockey team will play in the New England Women's Hockey Alliance.

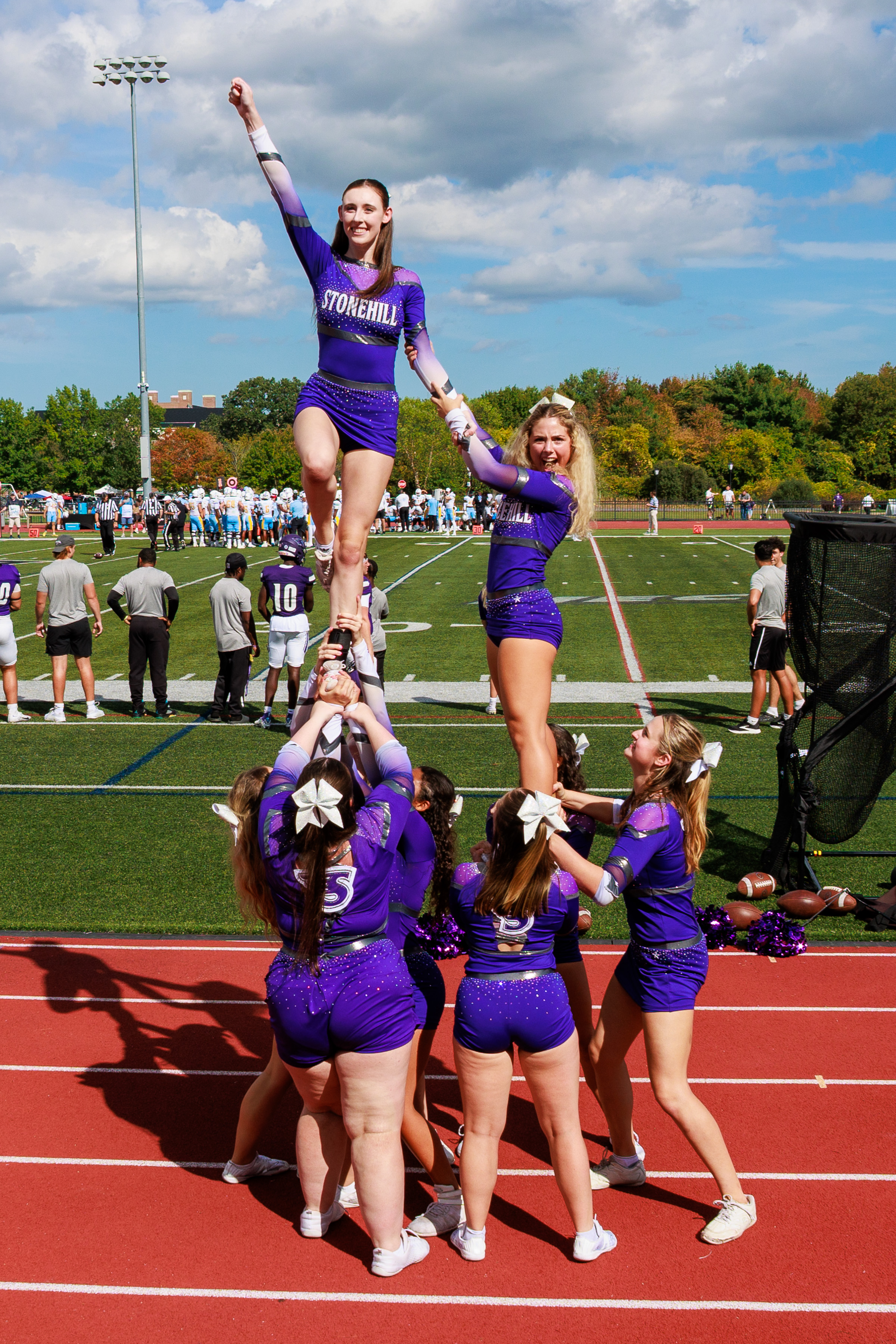
Stonehill cheerleaders

=== List of teams ===
Men's sports	Women's sports
Baseball	Basketball
Basketball	Cross country
Cross country	Equestrian
Football	Field hockey
Ice hockey	Golf
Soccer	Ice hockey
Tennis	Lacrosse
Track and field^{†}	Soccer
	Softball
	Swimming & diving
	Tennis
	Track and field^{†}
	Volleyball
† – Track and field includes both indoor and outdoor

== National championships ==
=== Team ===
Association	Division	Sport	Year	Opponent	Score
NCAA	Division II	Women's Lacrosse	2003	Longwood	9–8
NCAA	Division II	Women's Lacrosse	2005	West Chester	13–10

== Facilities ==
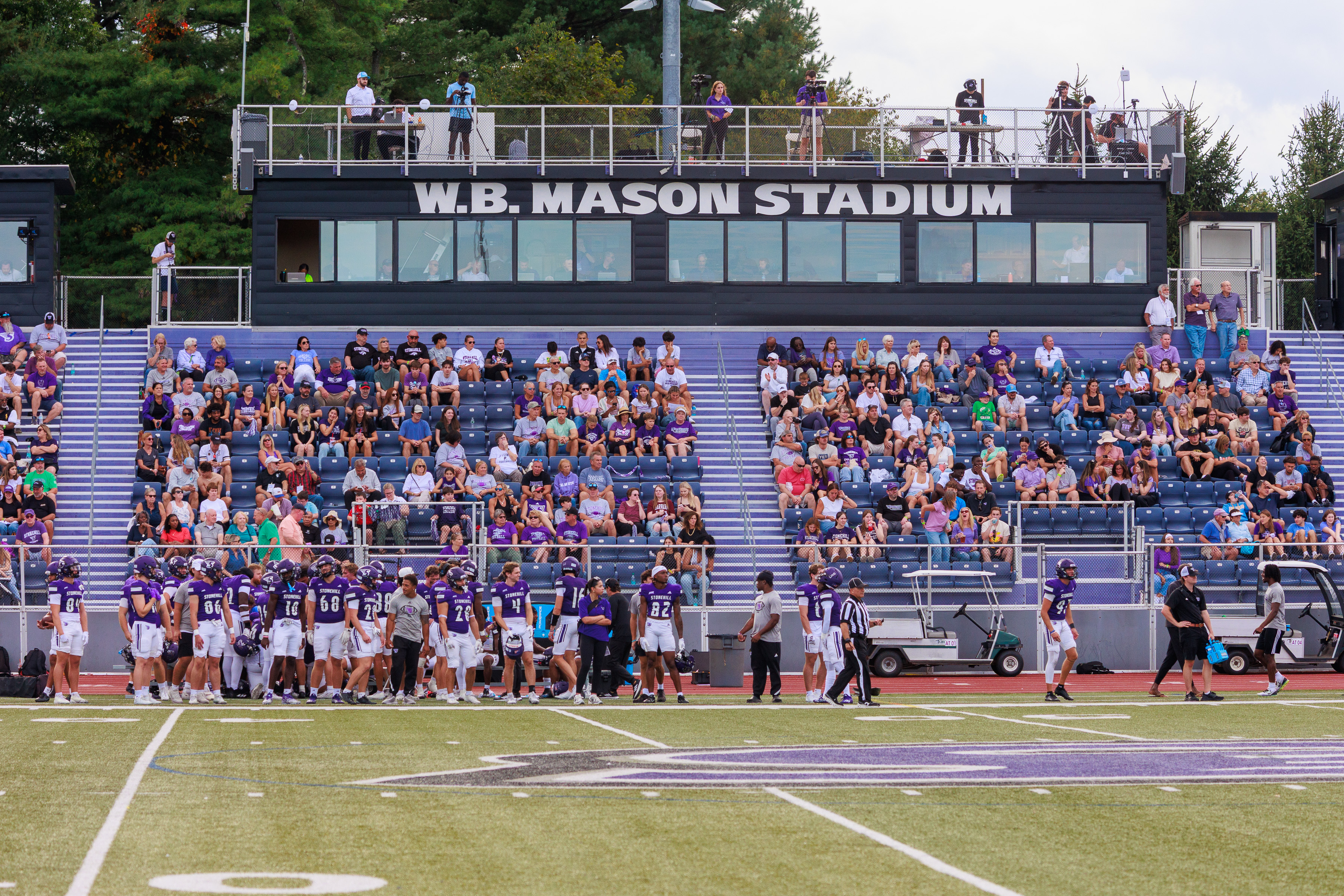
W.B. Mason Stadium bleachers

The Sally Blair Ames Sports Complex is home to the College staff that sponsors eight intercollegiate club teams featuring Ultimate, Rugby, Lacrosse and Golf as well as an extensive intramural sports program offering Basketball, Soccer, Floor Hockey and Flag Football.

W.B. Mason Stadium is a 2,400-seat, multipurpose sports stadium. Opened in 2005 at a cost of $4 million, it is the home of Skyhawk football, lacrosse, field hockey, and track & field. W.B. Mason, an office-supplies dealer based in nearby Brockton, Massachusetts, and its alumni employees contributed $1.5 million toward the project.

The stadium was dedicated on September 10, 2005. The playing field is named Timothy J. Coughlin Memorial Field, in honor of a 1980 Stonehill alumnus and football captain who was killed when the North Tower of the World Trade Center was destroyed on September 11, 2001.

Most of the seating is bleacher-style; the two midfield sections have stadium seating with seat-backs.

After the stadium's formal dedication on September 10, 2005, Stonehill defeated Pace University 17–13 in the first football game played in the new stadium.
