= WSHL-FM =

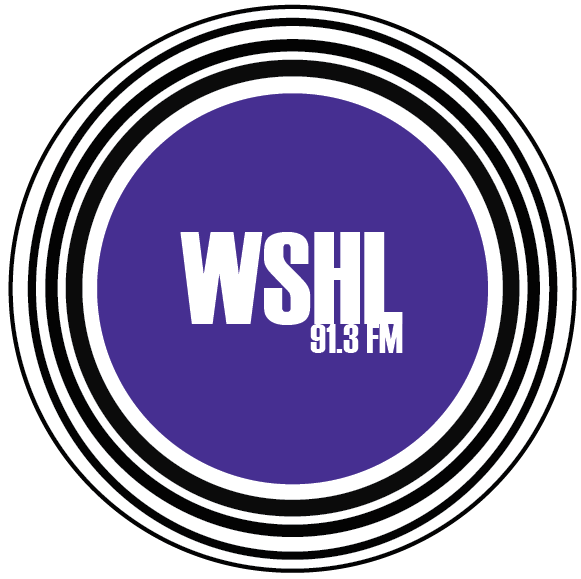
- Easton, Massachusetts; United States
- Broadcast area: Greater Brockton-Easton area
- Frequency: 91.3 MHz
- Branding: The Radio Voice Of Stonehill College

Programming
- Format: Alternative music

Ownership
- Owner: Stonehill College, Inc.

History
- First air date: January 1974
- Former call signs: WSTO (1969–1974)
- Call sign meaning: Stonehill

Technical information
- Licensing authority: FCC
- Facility ID: 63487
- Class: A
- ERP: 100 watts
- HAAT: 20 meters (66 ft)
- Transmitter coordinates: 42°3′27.3″N 71°4′45.1″W

Links
- Public license information: Public file; LMS
- Webcast: Listen live
- Website: www.wshl913.com

WSHL-FM (91.3 FM) is a college radio station broadcasting an alternative music format. Licensed to Easton, Massachusetts, United States, the station serves the Greater Brockton-Easton area of Massachusetts, 24/7 in Stereo. The station is owned by Stonehill College, Inc. and has been operating since January 1974.

WSHL-FM studios and offices are located on the 1st floor of the Roche Dining Commons at Stonehill College. The transmitter and antenna are located at the College Center Building, also on the campus of Stonehill College in North Easton, Massachusetts.

Peter Q. George is the Chief Engineer for the station, while Geoffrey Lantos is the faculty advisor.

== Summer ==
During the summer, adolescents participating in the summer program, College Academy, have the opportunity to take a class where they can broadcast on the radio station.
