= W. B. Mason =

American office supplier

Coordinates: 42°5′2.0″N 71°1′5.6″W

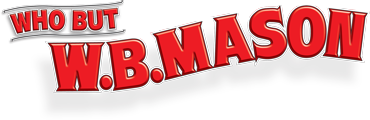

- Type: Private
- Industry: Workplace products
- Founded: 1898; 128 years ago Brockton, Massachusetts, U.S.
- Founder: William Betts Mason
- Headquarters: 59 Centre Street Brockton, Massachusetts, U.S.
- Number of locations: 60+
- Area served: United States
- Key people: Leo Meehan
- Products: Office supplies Paper; Ink & toner Technology; Foodservice; Shipping & packaging Facilities maintenance Safety; Break room furniture Coffee & water School supplies Custom products
- Revenue: $1.8 billion
- Number of employees: 2,500
- Divisions: WhattaBargain! outlet stores W. B. Mason Interiors
- Website: www.wbmason.com

W. B. Mason is an American business products company headquartered in Brockton, Massachusetts. The company is known for its colorful delivery vehicles.

The company was founded in 1898 and started out selling rubber stamps and stencils for the Brockton shoe industry. It has since expanded into office supplies, janitorial and sanitation products, shipping and packaging materials, break room and coffee supplies, foodservice products, custom printing, and other business supplies.

W. B. Mason has over 60 distribution centers and leases over 1,000 delivery trucks from Ryder, servicing more than 300,000 businesses across the United States.

== History ==
On February 25, 1897, The American Stationer reported that William Betts Mason "has opened an office in the City Block at Brockton, Mass." with plans to "manufacture rubber stamps, stencils, and other articles of a like nature." By March 25, it was reported as a rubber stamp store.

The company started as a business that sold printed products, engraved products, and rubber stamps. As the city of Brockton expanded in the early 20th century, largely due to the shoe industry, W. B. Mason expanded its sales offerings to include office supplies.

In 1901, W. B. Mason's rubber stamps store received a $1.50 disbursement from the City Engineer of Brockton, Massachusetts alongside 24 other businesses, some of whom received over $100. By 1912, it was referred to as a "stamp, stencil, and printing business."

William Betts Mason ran the company until his death in 1912. The Mason family continued to oversee the company until the 1920s under William's wife, Marcena. In the late 1920s, W. B. Mason was sold to an employee and Brockton businessman, Samuel Kovner, who started his career out by sweeping the floors at W. B. Mason as a boy. Under Kovner, the company reached sales of $243,000.

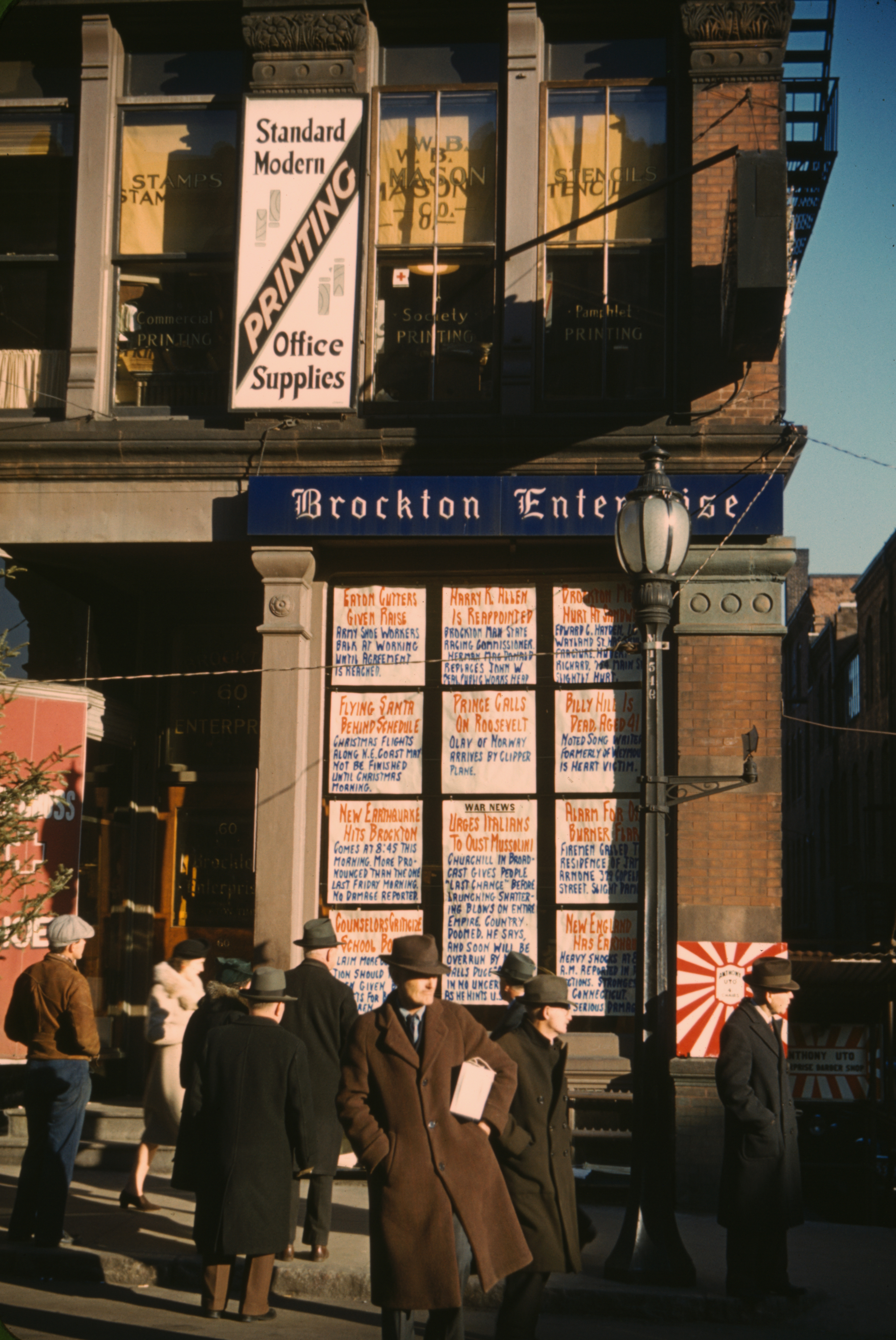
W. B. Mason's original storefront above the Brockton Enterprise, 1940

=== Later 20th century ===
In 1963, Kovner sold the company to his daughter and son-in-law, Helen Greene and Joseph Greene. The Greenes added furniture to the business and the company reached nearly a million dollars in sales by Joseph's death in 1973. The Greenes' son Steve Greene took over leadership of the company, and in 1983 Steve and his brother, John Greene, took over ownership from their mother and invited longstanding employee Leo Meehan to join as a partner.

=== Branding ===
In 1986, the company introduced its slogan, "Who But W. B. Mason", as part of a rebrand by the local agency TJ Clark. The slogan was later combined with a portrait of William Betts Mason to form their current corporate logo. The logo features two U.S. flags flanking the portrait of W. B. Mason, one with 50 stars to represent the current state of the union, and the other with 45 stars, the configuration at the time of the company's founding.

=== Ownership ===
In 1993, Steve Greene replaced his mother Helen Greene as the Chairman of the Board of Directors. At this point, the company's sales were $20 million. Upon Greene's appointment to the board, Leo Meehan became President and CEO. Under Meehan, the company focused on local service, personalized sales, and free delivery. W. B. Mason reached sales of $247 million by 2001.

In 1997, W. B. Mason began advertising on television. Its first commercial aired during the 1997 Super Bowl. Besides commercials, their trucks, catalogues, and baseball park signage are its advertising. Its baseball sponsorships began with the Boston Red Sox in 2003, followed by the Philadelphia Phillies in 2004 and the New York Yankees in 2005; by 2017 it worked with eight Major League Baseball clubs. In October 2017, it became the league's official office products supplier and the presenting sponsor of replay review for that year's postseason, its first national sports partnership.

In 2011, the company reached $1 billion in sales. In November 2013, W. B. Mason began working with France-based Lyreco to provide international delivery. W. B. Mason is currently owned by the Greene and Meehan families.

In 2016, the Federal Trade Commission called Meehan as a key witness in its antitrust case against the proposed merger of Staples and Office Depot. Meehan testified that the two were the only nationwide business-to-business office suppliers, and the judge found W. B. Mason's lack of desire or ability to expand beyond its regional market significant. After Judge Emmet Sullivan issued an injunction against the deal in May 2016, Staples and Office Depot called off the $6.3 billion merger.

=== Pandemic pivot ===
In 2020, amid the COVID-19 pandemic, W. B. Mason began delivering its office products to homes, a service it had declined to pursue in the past. CEO Meehan told The Wall Street Journal logistics and costs had previously prevented the move. W. B. Mason at that time also debuted a consumer-facing website. The Journal said the company's revenue was then about $2 billion, and its employee count was about 1,900, down from 4,000 before the pandemic.

== William Betts Mason ==
William Betts Mason
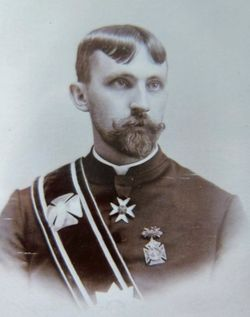
- Born: March 15, 1865; Auckland, New Zealand
- Died: May 12, 1912 (aged 47)
- Occupation: Businessman

William Betts Mason was born in Auckland, New Zealand in 1865. After his father's death in 1871, he immigrated to the United States with his grandmother Agnes Dunn Bettridge, mother Janet Caroline Mason (née Bettridge) and sisters Sarah, Eliza, and Eadith Mason. In 1872 his family moved to Brockton, at the time known as North Bridgewater, to live with Janet's brother, Arthur J. C. Bettridge. Mason's first occupation was as a counter maker and trimmer in Brockton.

He married his first wife Clara W. Belcher of Randolph, Massachusetts in 1892. He continued to work in the counter making field until 1893, at which point he went to work for S. W. S. Howard, a local printing company. In 1896 he left S. W. S. Howard and went into business for himself, making specialty brass plates, checks, and rubber stamps.

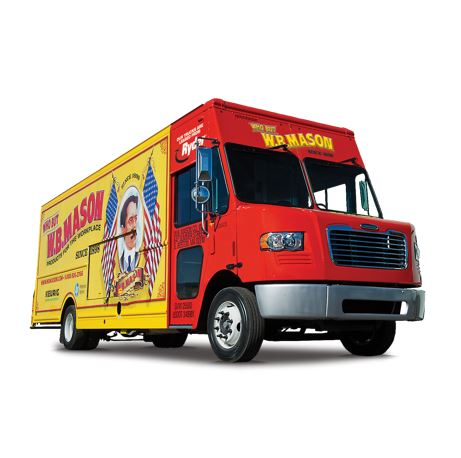
W. B. Mason delivery truck

In 1898, Mason founded the W. B. Mason Company as a rubber stamp and stencil company. W. B. Mason continues to manufacture its own rubber stamps today. In December 1905, Mason married his second wife, Marcena D. Horton of Bristol, Rhode Island. She ran the company from the time of Mason's death in 1912 until Samuel Kovner's acquisition of the company in the late 1920s.

Mason sang around Brockton in the Gerrish Male Barbershop Quartet, and was a member of the Brockton-based Paul Revere Lodge of Freemasons.

Mason died in 1912. He was buried at Union Cemetery, a half mile from W. B. Mason headquarters. He left no children.

== Products and services ==
W. B. Mason provides products for the workplace. On www.wbmason.com the primary product lines include office and school supplies, paper, janitorial supplies, furniture, food and break room supplies, technology and electronics, food service, and custom print.

W. B. Mason also provides the following services:

- Interior design and contract furniture
- Discount furniture
- Custom products (print, ad specialty, apparel)

== Sponsorships ==
=== Baseball ===
W. B. Mason is the "Official Office Products Supplier" to the Boston Red Sox, New York Yankees, and Philadelphia Phillies. W. B. Mason has its corporate logo displayed throughout several teams' home ballparks including Fenway Park in Boston, Citizens Bank Park in Philadelphia, and Yankee Stadium in New York. In 2003 W. B. Mason placed its first ball park advertisement on the Green Monster at Fenway Park; this was the first advertisement painted on the Green Monster since 1947.

W. B. Mason baseball programs
Team	Time	Show	Network
Boston Red Sox	Post-game	W. B. Mason's Extra Innings	NESN
New York Yankees	Post-game	The W. B. Mason Post Game Show	YES

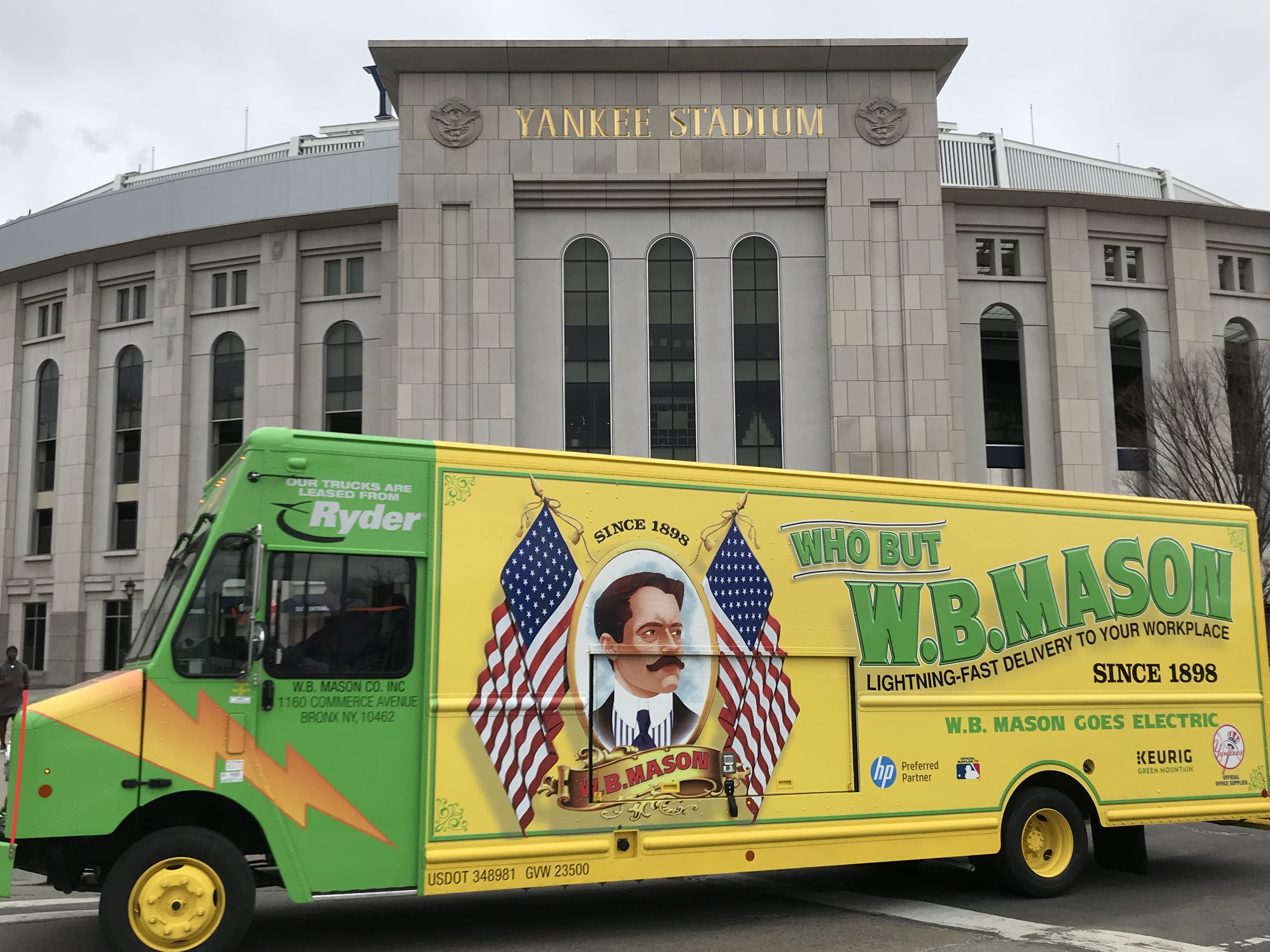
W. B. Mason electric truck outside of Yankee Stadium

== Philanthropy and initiatives ==
=== Projects ===
In June 2017 W. B. Mason announced a $10 million donation to the Leo J. Meehan School of Business at Stonehill College in Easton, a few miles from Brockton. Stonehill is the alma mater of the current president and CEO. This was the second largest donation in the school's history. The business school opened in August 2019. It houses Stonehill's accounting, finance, international business, management, marketing, economics and healthcare administration programs.

In 2007, W. B. Mason donated $1 million to Brockton Hospital in the name of Helen Greene.

W. B. Mason was a platinum benefactor in the opening of the Trinity Catholic Academy in Brockton.

W. B. Mason was the primary donor to W. B. Mason Stadium at Stonehill College.

In 2017 W. B. Mason donated the John, Steven, and Caryll Greene Cancer Center at Brockton Hospital.

=== Sustainability ===
On October 17, 2017 W. B. Mason and Workhorse Group Inc. introduced the first all-electric W. B. Mason truck. The vehicle has an average range of 120 miles on a single charge and reduces vehicle emissions by 75%.

== Locations ==
W. B. Mason has over 60 distribution centers in the United States, and provides nationwide delivery services to its customers.

== Controversies ==
In October 2018, the company was sued for trademark infringement by Bloomington, Minnesota-based Dairy Queen — owned by Warren Buffett's Berkshire Hathaway in Omaha, Nebraska and doing business as American Dairy Queen Corp. — over using the term "Blizzard" and logo for its private-label bottled water. A federal judge in June 2022 ruled in favor of W. B. Mason, allowing them to continue to use the name and logo. W. B. Mason's attorneys, Nixon Peabody, called it "a complete win" for the company, and NBC Boston described it as a W. B. Mason "victory."

In April 2023, W. B. Mason agreed to a $5.65 million settlement to resolve a class action lawsuit claiming it failed to provide commissioned sales representatives with notice the company was changing commission terms.

The settlement benefits three classes: the New Jersey Class, the New York Class and the Pennsylvania Class.

The New Jersey Class includes individuals who worked for W. B. Mason as commissioned sales representatives based or working in New Jersey since April 2, 2015.

The New York Class includes individuals who worked for W. B. Mason as commissioned sales representatives based or working in New York since April 2, 2015.

The Pennsylvania Class includes individuals who worked for W. B. Mason as commissioned sales representatives based or working in Pennsylvania since April 28, 2017.
