= Eastern Collegiate Football Conference (1988–1997) =

Defunct NCAA Division III athletic conference

The Eastern Collegiate Football Conference (ECFC) was an intercollegiate athletic conference that existed from 1988 to 1997 and one of two college football conferences to share this name. The league had members in the states of Massachusetts and Rhode Island.

== Champions ==
- 1989 – Stonehill
- 1990 – Bentley
- 1991 – Stonehill
- 1992 – Bentley
- 1993 – Bentley
- 1994 – Bentley
- 1995 – Stonehill
- 1996 – Salve Regina
- 1997 – Salve Regina

== See also ==
- List of defunct college football conferences
