= W. B. Mason Stadium =

Multi-purpose stadium in Massachusetts, United States

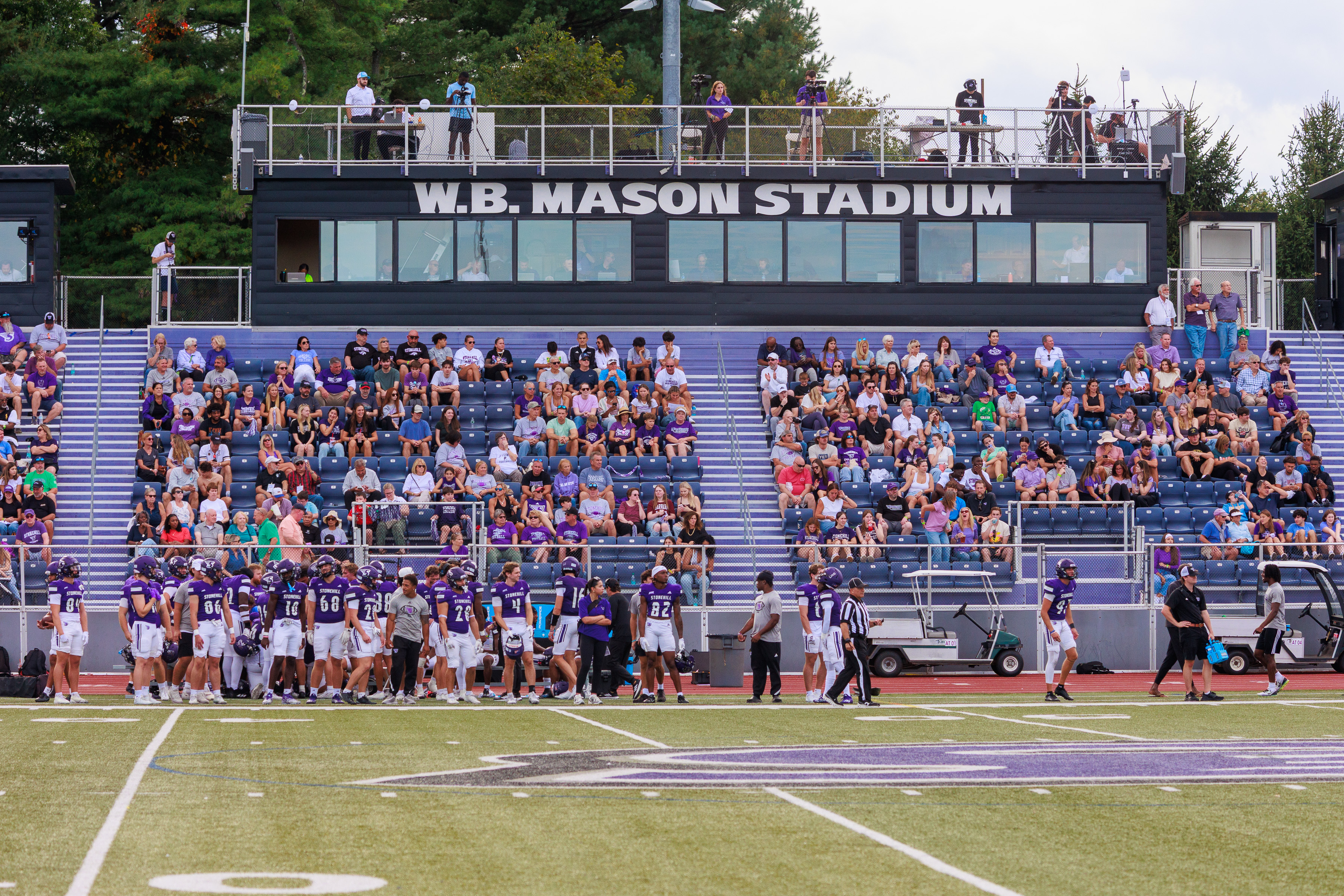
- Interactive map of W. B. Mason Stadium
- Location: Easton, Massachusetts
- Coordinates: 42.0573°N 71.0824°W
- Owner: Stonehill College
- Operator: Stonehill College
- Capacity: 2,400
- Surface: FieldTurf

Construction
- Groundbreaking: September 10, 2005
- Opened: September 9, 2006
- Cost: US $4 million

Tenant
- Stonehill Skyhawks (NCAA) (2006–)

W. B. Mason Stadium is a 2,400-seat multi-purpose stadium in Easton, Massachusetts. It is the home of the Stonehill Skyhawks field hockey, football, lacrosse, and track & field programs. The stadium has a FieldTurf surface and a 400-meter eight-lane track.

== History ==
=== Naming ===
The stadium's naming rights are held by W. B. Mason, a business products company based in nearby Brockton. Before the stadium's construction, W. B. Mason CEO Leo Meehan (himself a Stonehill alumnus and trustee) announced that the company would contribute $1.5 million of its $4 million cost.

The playing surface is known as Timothy J. Coughlin Memorial Field, named after Stonehill alumnus (Class of 1980) and football player Tim "Cogs" Coughlin, who was Managing Director of Cantor Fitzgerald and was killed in its World Trade Center headquarters during the September 11 attacks.

=== Notable events ===
- October 18, 2012 NCAA Division II Game of the Week on CBS Sports Network
- Various Northeast-10 Conference field hockey and women's lacrosse tournament games
- 2009 & 2016 NCAA Division II Field Hockey Championship
- 2010 & 2014 Northeast-10 Outdoor Track & Field Championships
- 2022 NCAA Division II Women’s Lacrosse East Regional Tournament

== Panorama ==
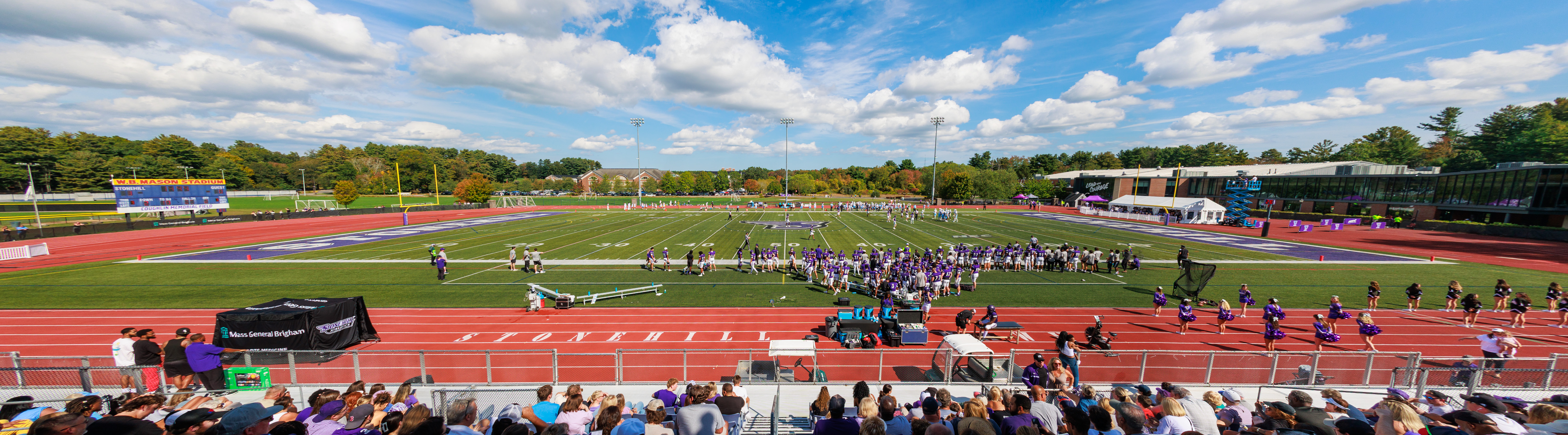
W. B. Mason Stadium in 2025; scoreboard at left, Sally Blair Ames Sports Complex at right.
