= Stonehill College =

Catholic college in Easton, Massachusetts, US

- Seal of Stonehill College
- Motto: Lux et Spes
- Motto in English: Light and Hope
- Type: Private college
- Established: 1948; 78 years ago
- Accreditation: NECHE
- Religious affiliation: Roman Catholic (Congregation of Holy Cross)
- Endowment: $326.5 million (2025)
- President: John Denning
- Faculty: 175 full-time
- Students: 2,491
- Location: North Easton, Massachusetts, U.S. 42.057°N 71.080°W
- Campus: Suburban, 375 acres (152 ha)
- Colors: Purple and white
- Nickname: Skyhawks
- Sporting affiliations: NCAA Division I – NEC
- Mascot: "Ace" the Skyhawk
- Website: www.stonehill.edu

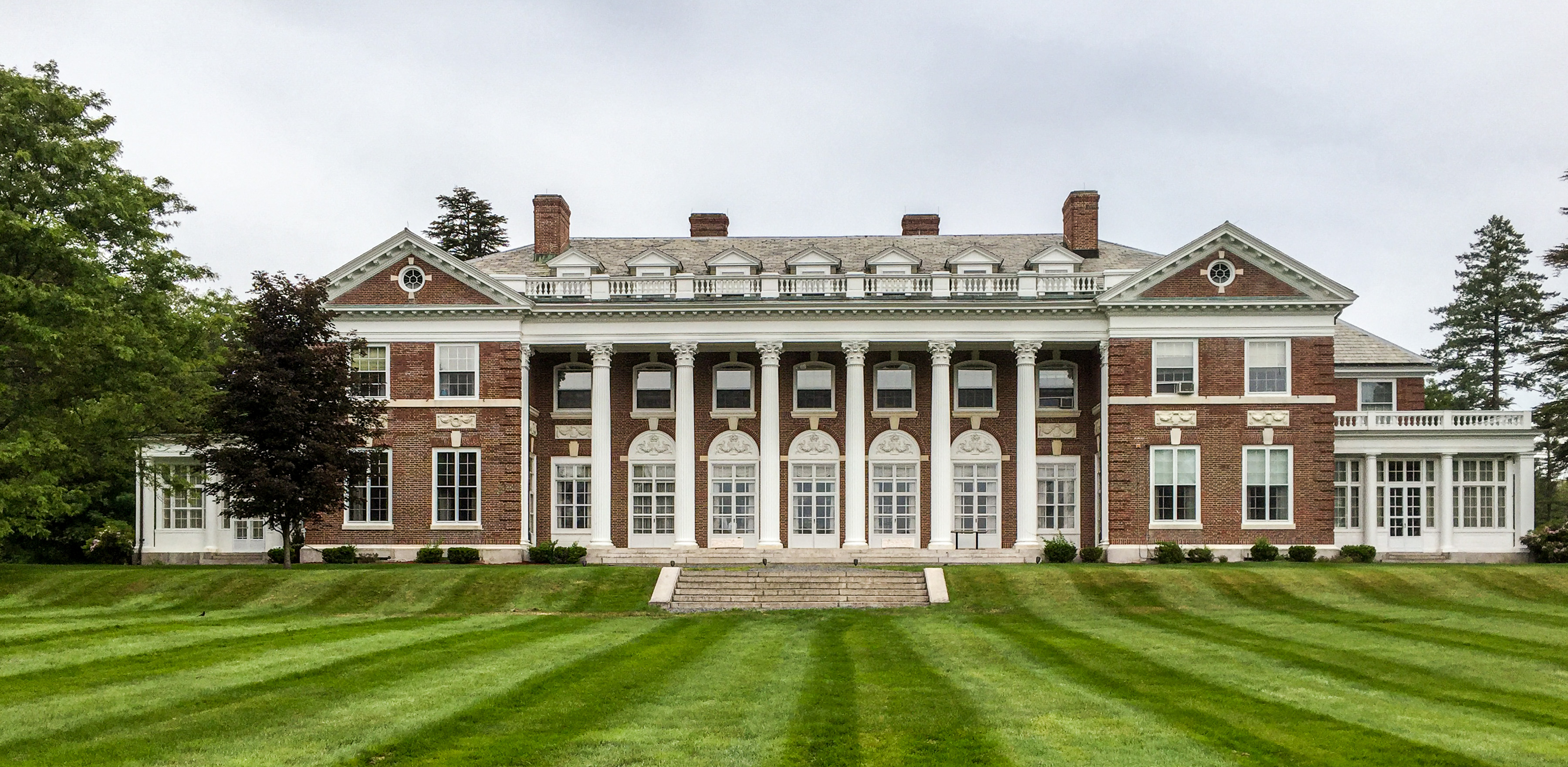
The former Ames estate was the first building of the Stonehill campus

Stonehill College is a private Catholic college in Easton, Massachusetts, United States. It was founded in 1948 by the Congregation of Holy Cross and is located on the original estate of Frederick Lothrop Ames Jr., with 29 buildings that complement the original Georgian-style Ames mansion.

Stonehill's engineering majors spend their last four semesters of undergraduate education at the University of Notre Dame, Stonehill's sister institution and another Holy Cross school.

== History ==
In the autumn of 1934, the Holy Cross Fathers in North Dartmouth began to look for new quarters because of increasing seminary enrollment. The current Stonehill campus was purchased from Mrs. Frederick Lothrop Ames Jr. on October 17, 1935. The initial purchase included 350 acres (1.4 km^{2}) and the original Ames mansion; the congregation purchased the remaining 190 acres (0.77 km^{2}) from Mrs. Cutler two years later. Frederick Lothrop Ames Jr. was the great-grandson of Oliver Ames Sr., who came to Easton in 1803 and established the Ames Shovel Company.

The Commonwealth of Massachusetts authorized the Congregation of Holy Cross to establish Stonehill College on the Frederick Lothrop Ames Jr. estate on June 30, 1948. In September of that year the college enrolled 134 men as the first class. Classes were held in the mansion and in the Ames Gym.

The first building built by the college was the Science Building which opened in February 1949. In 1974, the building was renovated and renamed the Tracy Science Building in honor of David Tracy, a former Stonehill advisor and trustee. After the opening of the Shields Science Center in 2009, the building was converted to be used by university administration and was renamed Merkert-Tracy Hall.

In June 2017, the college announced that W.B. Mason would be donating $10 million to open the Leo J. Meehan School of Business. The school is named after alumnus and W.B. Mason CEO Leo Meehan, and accommodates programs in accounting, finance, international business, management, marketing, economics, and healthcare administration.

The first issue of the college newspaper, The Summit, was published on November 3, 1949. In the fall of 1951, the college decided to become a coeducational organization and enrolled 19 women. The first class graduated from Stonehill on the first Sunday of June 1952 and consisted of 73 men.

== Academics ==
Through the May School of Arts and Sciences and the Meehan School of Business, Stonehill awards on the undergraduate level the B.A., B.S., and BSBA They have also added several master's degree programs. The Integrated Marketing Communications master's program was launched during the 2017–2018 school year, a Special Education (K-8) program was launched in May 2019, and a Data Analytics program launched in fall of 2020.

Stonehill offers 47 major programs, the opportunity to double major or participate in one of the college's 51 minor programs. Stonehill College is accredited by the New England Commission of Higher Education.

=== MacPhaidin Library ===
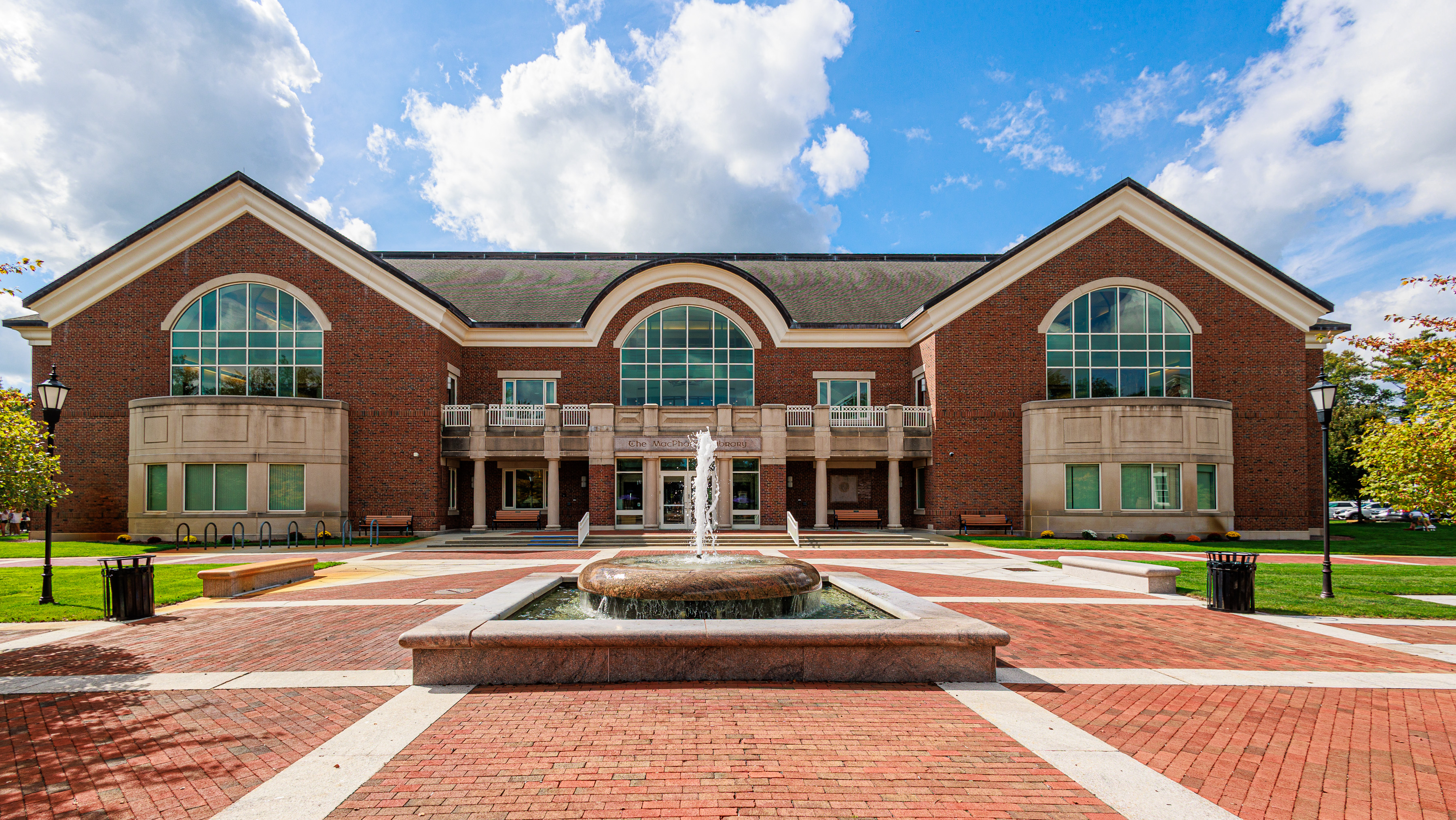
MacPhaidin Library

The MacPhaidin Library, named in honor of Stonehill College's eighth president, Bartley MacPhaidin, was constructed in 1997 and opened in May 1998. The MacPhaidin Library is three stories high and covers 600,000 square feet (56,000 m^{2}). It houses a collection of 250,000 print volumes, more than 100 full-text databases and indexes, and two computer labs. Various works of local art and history are on display at the library as well as a large collection of historical Irish documents and literature.

== Student life ==
=== Campus media ===
- The Summit: Bi-weekly newspaper (student-run).
- Rolling Stonehill: Culture magazine (student-run).
- WSHL-FM: Radio station (student-run).
- Channel 70: Stonehill's TV station.

=== Housing ===
Stonehill provides guaranteed four years of housing to students admitted as residential students. The housing is set up as freshman/sophomore and junior/senior. O'Hara Hall and The Holy Cross Center are designated freshman traditional-style dorms.

Both freshmen and sophomores have the chance to live in Boland Hall, Corr Hall, and Villa Theresa Hall.

The Pilgrim Heights, the O'Hara Village and the Pilgrim Heights Village suite-style housing is primarily for sophomores.

Juniors and seniors all live in suite-style housing in the Colonial ("Junior") Courts, Commonwealth ("Senior") Courts, Pilgrim Heights (sophomores & juniors), Notre Dame du Lac, and Bogan (New) Hall.

== Athletics ==
The Athletic Department fields 21 competitive NCAA Division I intercollegiate varsity sports. The College's combination of academic and athletic success has garnered Stonehill the #4 ranking in the country among NCAA Division II schools in the Collegiate Power Rankings that are published by the National College Scouting Association. Furthermore, Stonehill finished 65th in the overall NCSA Top 100 Power Rankings across all three NCAA divisions.

On April 5, 2022, Stonehill announced a transition to Div. I sports, with most of the teams joining the Northeast Conference, and men's ice hockey becoming a Div I independent for the 2022–2023 season.

The Sally Blair Ames Sports Complex is home to the college staff that sponsors fourteen intercollegiate club teams featuring ultimate frisbee, rugby, lacrosse and golf as well as an extensive intramural sports program offering Basketball, Soccer, Floor Hockey and Flag Football.

W.B. Mason Stadium is a 2,400-seat, multipurpose sports stadium. Opened in 2005 at a cost of $4 million, it is the home of Skyhawk football, lacrosse, field hockey, and track & field. W.B. Mason, an office-supplies dealer based in nearby Brockton, Massachusetts, and its alumni employees contributed $1.5 million toward the project.
