= 2025 LIU Sharks football team =

College football team

2025 LIU Sharks football

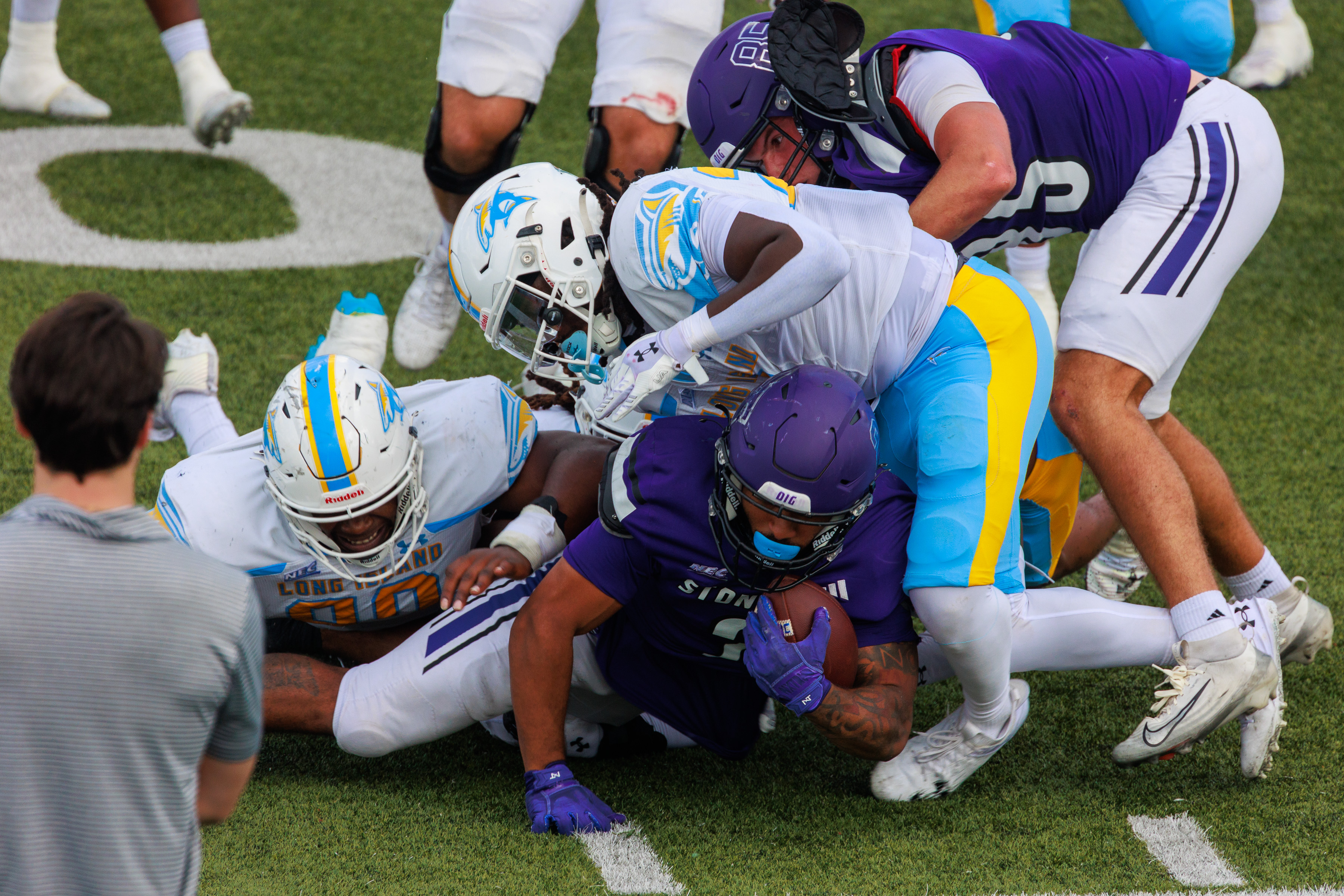
- Sharks tackle a Skyhawk, September 27
- Conference: Northeast Conference
- Record: 6–6 (4–3 NEC)
- Head coach: Ron Cooper (4th season)
- Co-offensive coordinators: John Roberts (4th season); Kort Shankweiler (4th season)
- Defensive coordinator: TyQuan Hammock (2nd season)
- Home stadium: Bethpage Federal Credit Union Stadium

2025 Northeast Conference football standings
	Conf.			Overall
Team	W		L	W		L
Central Connecticut $^	6	–	1	8	–	5
Duquesne	5	–	2	7	–	5
Mercyhurst*	4	–	3	5	–	7
LIU	4	–	3	6	–	6
Wagner	4	–	3	5	–	7
Stonehill	3	–	4	4	–	8
Robert Morris	2	–	5	3	–	9
New Haven*	0	–	0	5	–	5
Saint Francis	0	–	7	0	–	11
$ – Conference champion; ^ – FCS playoff participant; * – Ineligible for NEC title and FCS postseason play due to transition from NCAA Division II.; Rankings from STATS Poll

The 2025 LIU Sharks football team represented both the LIU Post and LIU Brooklyn campuses of Long Island University as a member of the Northeast Conference (NEC) during the 2025 NCAA Division I FCS football season. The Sharks were led by fourth-year head coach Ron Cooper and played their home games at Bethpage Federal Credit Union Stadium in Brookville, New York.

== Preseason ==
=== Preseason coaches' poll ===
The NEC released their preseason coaches' poll on August 4, 2025. The Sharks were picked to finish in third place, tied with Robert Morris.

== Schedule ==
Date	Time	Opponent	Site	TV	Result	Attendance
August 30	7:00 p.m.	at No. 15 (FBS) Florida*	Ben Hill Griffin Stadium; Gainesville, FL	SECN+/ESPN+	L 0–55	89,451
September 6	7:00 p.m.	at Eastern Michigan*	Rynearson Stadium; Ypsilanti, MI	ESPN+	W 28–23	15,313
September 13	12:00 p.m.	Sacred Heart*^{†}	Bethpage Federal Credit Union Stadium; Brookville, NY	NEC Front Row	L 21–24	2,504
September 20	6:00 p.m.	at No. 7 Rhode Island*	Meade Stadium; Kingston, RI	FloFootball	L 7–28	5,520
September 27	1:00 p.m.	at Stonehill	W.B. Mason Stadium; North Easton, MA	NEC Front Row	L 3–10	1,800
October 4	1:00 p.m.	at Mercyhurst	Saxon Stadium; Erie, PA	ESPN+	L 13–22	2,100
October 18	12:00 p.m.	Robert Morris	Bethpage Federal Credit Union Stadium; Brookville, NY	NEC Front Row	W 17–7	1,061
October 25	12:00 p.m.	New Haven*	Bethpage Federal Credit Union Stadium; Brookville, NY	NEC Front Row	W 38–16	1,113
November 1	12:00 p.m.	at Central Connecticut	Arute Field; New Britain, CT	NEC Front Row	L 7–10	2,323
November 8	12:00 p.m.	Duquesne	Bethpage Federal Credit Union Stadium; Brookville, NY	NEC Front Row	W 29–11	400
November 15	12:00 p.m.	at Saint Francis	DeGol Field; Loretto, PA	NEC Front Row	W 10–3	784
November 22	12:00 p.m.	Wagner	Bethpage Federal Credit Union Stadium; Brookville, NY	NEC Front Row	W 24–17	1,013
*Non-conference game; ^{†}Homecoming; Rankings from STATS Poll released prior to the game; All times are in Eastern time

== Game summaries ==
=== at No. 15 (FBS) Florida ===
LIU Sharks (0–0) at No. 15 (FBS) Florida Gators (0–0) – Game summary

Quarter	1	2	3	4	Total
Sharks	0	0	0	0	0
No. 15 (FBS) Gators	14	24	10	7	55

at Ben Hill Griffin Stadium • Gainesville, Florida

- Date: August 30
- Game time: 7:00 p.m. EDT
- Game weather: Temperature: 85 °F (29 °C) • Wind: NW at 5 miles per hour (8.0 km/h) • Weather: cloudy
- Game attendance: 89,451
- Referee: Trennis Livingston
- TV announcers (SECN+/ESPN+): Jay Alter (play-by-play), Rocky Boiman (analyst), and Stephanie Otey (sideline reporter)

Game information

First quarter

- FLA – Bryce Thornton 37-yard fumble return (Trey Smack kick), 13:41. Gators 7–0.
- FLA – Jadan Baugh 4-yard run (Trey Smack kick), 9:29. Gators 14–0. Drive: 6 plays, 66 yards, 2:21.

Second quarter

- FLA – Trey Smack 56-yard field goal, 14:47. Gators 17–0. Drive: 4 plays, 0 yards, 1:03.
- FLA – Eugene Wilson III 4-yard pass from DJ Lagway (Trey Smack kick), 7:04. Gators 24–0. Drive: 3 plays, 10 yards, 1:24.
- FLA – Hayden Hansen 4-yard pass from DJ Lagway (Trey Smack kick), 3:26. Gators 31–0. Drive: 6 plays, 88 yards, 1:59.
- FLA – J. Michael Sturdivant 8-yard pass from DJ Lagway (Trey Smack kick), 0:10. Gators 38–0. Drive: 6 plays, 75 yards, 1:40.

Third quarter

- FLA – Trey Smack 41-yard field goal, 10:53. Gators 41–0. Drive: 8 plays, 43 yards, 3:57.
- FLA – Tony Livingston 4-yard pass from Tramell Jones Jr. (Trey Smack kick), 2:03. Gators 48–0. Drive: 6 plays, 64 yards, 2:58.

Fourth quarter

- FLA – Taylor Spierto 11-yard pass from Tramell Jones Jr. (Trey Smack kick), 0:25. Gators 55–0. Drive: 13 plays, 78 yards, 6:06.

Statistics	LIU	FLA
First downs	2	27
Plays–yards	43–86	74–451
Rushes–yards	32–37	38–200
Passing yards	49	251
Passing: comp–att–int	4–11–0	27–36–0
Turnovers	2	0
Time of possession	25:33	34:27

Team	Category	Player	Statistics
LIU	Passing	Luca Stanzani	1/3, 28 yards
LIU	Rushing	Kam Ingram	4 carries, 14 yards
LIU	Receiving	Deion Richardson	2 receptions, 37 yards
Florida	Passing	Tramell Jones Jr.	12/18, 131 yards, 2 TD
Florida	Rushing	Jadan Baugh	9 carries, 104 yards, TD
Florida	Receiving	Vernell Brown III	3 receptions, 79 yards

=== at Eastern Michigan (FBS) ===
LIU Sharks (0-1) at Eastern Michigan Eagles (FBS) (0-1) – Game summary

Quarter	1	2	3	4	Total
Sharks	7	7	0	14	28
Eagles (FBS)	3	7	0	13	23

at Rynearson Stadium • Ypsilanti, Michigan

- Date: September 6
- Game time: 7:00 PM EDT
- Game attendance: 15,313
- Referee: Gregory Gompf
- TV announcers (ESPN+): Dan Gutowsky (play-by-play) and Ryan Cavanaugh (analyst)

Game information

First quarter

- LIU – Ethan Greenwood 65-yard run (Lance Maiberg kick), 10:46. Sharks 7–0. Drive: 5 plays, 90 yards, 2:17.
- EMU – Rudy Kessinger 32-yard field goal, 6:43. Sharks 7–3. Drive: 10 plays, 58 yards, 3:56.

Second quarter

- LIU – Ethan Greenwood 2-yard run (Lance Maiberg kick), 13:34. Sharks 14–3. Drive: 6 plays, 86 yards, 3:31.
- EMU – Dontae McMillan 33-yard pass from Noah Kim (Rudy Kessinger kick), 10:19. Sharks 14–10. Drive: 8 plays, 70 yars, 3:10.

Third quarter

- No scoring plays.

Fourth quarter

- LIU – Luca Stanzani 14-yard run (Lance Maiberg kick), 12:21. Sharks 21–10. Drive: 1 play, 14 yards, 0:06.
- EMU – Dontae McMillan 40-yard run (pass failed), 11:40. Sharks 21–16. Drive: 2 plays, 59 yards, 0:31.
- LIU – Luca Stanzani 2-yard run (Lance Maiberg kick), 1:56. Sharks 28–16. Drive: 16 plays, 75 yards, 9:44.
- EMU – Jamarien Wheeler 5-yard pass from Noah Kim (Rudy Kessinger kick), 0:41. Sharks 28–23. Drive: 8 plays, 56 yards, 1:08.

Statistics	LIU	EMU
First downs	21	17
Plays–yards	69–479	54–311
Rushes–yards	45–231	25–122
Passing yards	248	189
Passing: Comp–Att–Int	15-24-0	18–29–0
Turnovers	0	0
Time of possession	37:53	22:07

Team	Category	Player	Statistics
LIU	Passing	Luca Stanzani	12/18, 143 yards
LIU	Rushing	Ethan Greenwood	7 carries, 91 yards, 2 TD
LIU	Receiving	Luca Stanzani	1 reception, 74 yards
Eastern Michigan	Passing	Noah Kim	18/29, 189 yards, 2 TD
Eastern Michigan	Rushing	Dontae McMillan	8 carries, 58 yards, TD
Eastern Michigan	Receiving	Terry Lockett Jr.	8 receptions, 78 yards

=== Sacred Heart ===
Sacred Heart Pioneers (1-1) at LIU Sharks (1-1) – Game summary

Quarter	1	2	3	4	Total
Pioneers	0	7	7	10	24
Sharks	7	7	7	0	21

at Bethpage Federal Credit Union Stadium • Brookville, NY

- Date: September 13
- Game time: 12:00 p.m. EDT
- Game weather: Sunny
- Game attendance: 2,504
- Referee: Lance Carlen
- TV announcers (NEC Front Row): Phil Constantino (play-by-play) and Jim Wright (analyst)

Game information

First Quarter

- (14:48) LIU – Luca Stanzani 75-yard run, Will Johnson kick (Drive: 1 play, 75 yards, 0:12; LIU 7–0)

Second Quarter

- (3:36) SHU – Mitchell Summers 14-yard run, Matt Kling kick (Drive: 12 plays, 99 yards, 6:54; Tied 7–7)
- (0:56) LIU – O'Shawn Ross 1-yard run, Lance Maiberg kick (Drive: 8 plays, 53 yards, 2:39; LIU 14–7)

Third Quarter

- (11:24) LIU – Jaylin Lewis 0-yard fumble recovery, Lance Maiberg kick (LIU 21–7)
- (5:05) SHU – John Michalski 3-yard run, Matt Kling kick (Drive: 12 plays, 75 yards, 6:19; LIU 21–14)

Fourth Quarter

- (12:15) SHU – Curtis Whiting 5-yard run, Matt Kling kick (Drive: 1 play, 5 yards, 0:00; Tied 21–21)
- (0:00) SHU – Matt Kling 21-yard field goal (Drive: 10 plays, 77 yards, 3:06; Sacred Heart 24–21)

Statistics	SHU	LIU
First downs	26	12
Total yards	407	208
Rushing yards	214	184
Passing yards	193	24
Passing: Comp–Att–Int	14–19–2	3–10–0
Time of possession	38:10	21:50

Team	Category	Player	Statistics
Sacred Heart	Passing	Jack Snyder	14/18, 193 yards, 2 INT
Sacred Heart	Rushing	Mitchell Summers	24 carries, 105 yards, TD
Sacred Heart	Receiving	Kevin McGuire	5 receptions, 88 yards
LIU	Passing	Luca Stanzani	2/4, 14 yards
LIU	Rushing	O'Shawn Ross	16 carries, 82 yards, TD
LIU	Receiving	Jaron Kelley	1 reception, 10 yards

=== at No. 7 Rhode Island ===
LIU Sharks (1–2) at No. 7 Rhode Island Rams (3–0) – Game summary

Quarter	1	2	3	4	Total
Sharks	0	7	0	0	7
No. 7 Rams	7	7	7	7	28

at Meade Stadium • Kingston, RI

- Date: September 20
- Game time: 6:00 PM EDT
- Game weather: Sunny
- Game attendance: 5,520
- Referee: Todd Boyd
- TV: FloFootball

Game information

First quarter

- URI – Aboraa Kwarteng 5-yard pass from Devin Farrell (Garth White kick), 1:09. Rams 7–0. Drive: 8 plays, 55 yards, 4:04.

Second quarter

- URI – Marquis Buchanan 35-yard pass from Devin Farrell (Garth White kick), 11:03. Rams 14–0. Drive: 9 plays, 79 yards, 3:46.
- LIU – Chris Howell 6-yard run (Lance Maiberg kick), 0:36. Rams 14–7. Drive: 11 plays, 67 yards, 3:30.

Third quarter

- URI – Devin Farrell 2-yard run (Garth White kick), 10:43. Rams 21–7. Drive: 2 plays, 4 yards, 0:29.

Fourth quarter

- URI – Antwain Littleton Jr. 1-yard run (Garth White kick), 9:11. Rams 28–7. Drive: 14 plays, 86 yards, 7:48.

Statistics	LIU	URI
First downs	16	17
Plays–yards	63–304	69–351
Rushes–yards	35–203	37–158
Passing yards	101	193
Passing: Comp–Att–Int	10–28–2	19–32–1
Turnovers	2	1
Time of possession	28:58	31:02

Team	Category	Player	Statistics
LIU	Passing	Chris Howell	10/28, 101 yards, 2 INT
LIU	Rushing	OJ Ross	11 carries, 130 yards
LIU	Receiving	Deion Richardson	3 receptions, 41 yards
Rhode Island	Passing	Devin Farrell	19/32, 193 yards, 2 TD, INT
Rhode Island	Rushing	Antwain Littleton Jr.	29 carries, 119 yards, TD
Rhode Island	Receiving	Marquis Buchanan	7 receptions, 103 yards, TD

=== at Stonehill ===
LIU Sharks (1-3) vs. Stonehill Skyhawks (1-3) – Game summary

Quarter	1	2	3	4	Total
Sharks	0	0	3	0	3
Skyhawks	0	3	0	7	10

at W.B. Mason Stadium • North Easton, MA

- Date: September 27
- Game time: 1:00 PM EDT
- TV: NEC Front Row

Statistics	LIU	STO
First downs		
Total yards		
Rushing yards		
Passing yards		
Passing: Comp–Att–Int		
Time of possession		

Team	Category	Player	Statistics
LIU	Passing		
LIU	Rushing		
LIU	Receiving		
Stonehill	Passing		
Stonehill	Rushing		
Stonehill	Receiving		

=== at Mercyhurst ===
LIU Sharks (1-4) vs. Mercyhurst Lakers (1-4) – Game summary

Quarter	1	2	3	4	Total
Sharks	0	3	10	0	13
Lakers	6	9	0	7	22

at Saxon Stadium • Erie, PA

- Date: October 4
- Game time: 1:00 p.m. EDT
- TV announcers (ESPN+): Craig D'Amico (play-by-play) and Wayne Bradford (analyst)

Statistics	LIU	MERC
First downs		
Total yards		
Rushing yards		
Passing yards		
Passing: Comp–Att–Int		
Time of possession		

Team	Category	Player	Statistics
LIU	Passing		
LIU	Rushing		
LIU	Receiving		
Mercyhurst	Passing		
Mercyhurst	Rushing		
Mercyhurst	Receiving		

=== Robert Morris ===
Robert Morris Colonials (1-5) vs. LIU Sharks (1-5) – Game summary

Quarter	1	2	3	4	Total
Colonials	0	0	0	7	7
Sharks	0	14	0	3	17

at Bethpage Federal Credit Union Stadium • Brookville, NY

- Date: October 18
- Game time: 12:00 p.m. EDT
- Game weather: Sunny
- Game attendance: 1,061
- Referee: Mike Quinn
- TV announcers (NEC Front Row): Phil Constantino (play-by-play) and Jim Wright (analyst)

Game information

First Quarter

No scoring plays

Second Quarter

- (13:30) LIU – O'Shawn Ross 6-yard run, Will Johnson kick (Drive: 10 plays, 66 yards, 5:57; LIU 7–0)
- (2:28) LIU – Jaiden Dozier 5-yard pass from Luca Stanzani, Will Johnson kick (Drive: 4 plays, 15 yards, 1:39; LIU 14–0)

Third Quarter

No scoring plays

Fourth Quarter

- (11:25) RMU – Ethan Shine 66-yard pass from Zach Tanner, Jayson Jenkins kick (Drive: 3 plays, 91 yards, 1:43; LIU 14–7)
- (1:03) LIU – Will Johnson 42-yard field goal (Drive: 7 plays, 15 yards, 3:11; LIU 21–7)

Statistics	RMU	LIU
First downs	7	18
Total yards	224	300
Rushing yards	47	197
Passing yards	177	103
Passing: Comp–Att–Int	14–27–1	15–26–1
Time of possession	21:50	38:10

Team	Category	Player	Statistics
Robert Morris	Passing	Zach Tanner	14/26, 177 yards, TD, INT
Robert Morris	Rushing	Ethan Shine	9 carries, 24 yards
Robert Morris	Receiving	Ethan Shine	8 receptions, 119 yards, TD
LIU	Passing	Luca Stanzani	15/26, 103 yards, TD, INT
LIU	Rushing	O'Shawn Ross	23 carries, 110 yards, TD
LIU	Receiving	O'Shawn Ross	6 receptions, 26 yards

=== New Haven ===
New Haven Chargers (4-3) vs. LIU Sharks (2-5) – Game summary

Quarter	1	2	3	4	Total
Chargers	0	16	0	0	16
Sharks	14	14	7	3	38

at Bethpage Federal Credit Union Stadium • Brookville, NY

- Date: October 25
- Game time: 12:00 p.m. EDT
- TV: NEC Front Row

Statistics	NH	LIU
First downs		
Total yards		
Rushing yards		
Passing yards		
Passing: Comp–Att–Int		
Time of possession		

Team	Category	Player	Statistics
New Haven	Passing		
New Haven	Rushing		
New Haven	Receiving		
LIU	Passing		
LIU	Rushing		
LIU	Receiving		

=== at Central Connecticut ===
LIU Sharks (3-5) vs. Central Connecticut Blue Devils (5-3) – Game summary

Quarter	1	2	3	4	Total
Sharks	0	0	7	0	7
Blue Devils	0	3	7	0	10

at Arute Field • New Britain, CT

- Date: November 1
- Game time: 12:00 p.m. EDT
- TV announcers (NEC Front Row): Bruce Biel (play-by-play) and Marc Robbins (analyst)

Statistics	LIU	CCSU
First downs		
Total yards		
Rushing yards		
Passing yards		
Passing: Comp–Att–Int		
Time of possession		

Team	Category	Player	Statistics
LIU	Passing		
LIU	Rushing		
LIU	Receiving		
Central Connecticut	Passing		
Central Connecticut	Rushing		
Central Connecticut	Receiving		

=== Duquesne ===
Duquesne Dukes (5-4) vs. LIU Sharks (3-6) – Game summary

Quarter	1	2	3	4	Total
Dukes	3	0	0	8	11
Sharks	8	7	14	0	29

at Bethpage Federal Credit Union Stadium • Brookville, NY

- Date: November 8

Statistics	DUQ	LIU
First downs		
Total yards		
Rushing yards		
Passing yards		
Passing: Comp–Att–Int		
Time of possession		

Team	Category	Player	Statistics
Duquesne	Passing		
Duquesne	Rushing		
Duquesne	Receiving		
LIU	Passing		
LIU	Rushing		
LIU	Receiving		

=== at Saint Francis (PA) ===
LIU Sharks (4-6) vs. Saint Francis Red Flash (0-9) – Game summary

Quarter	1	2	3	4	Total
Sharks	0	3	0	7	10
Red Flash	0	0	3	0	3

at DeGol Field • Loretto, PA

- Date: November 15

Statistics	LIU	SFPA
First downs		
Total yards		
Rushing yards		
Passing yards		
Passing: Comp–Att–Int		
Time of possession		

Team	Category	Player	Statistics
LIU	Passing		
LIU	Rushing		
LIU	Receiving		
Saint Francis (PA)	Passing		
Saint Francis (PA)	Rushing		
Saint Francis (PA)	Receiving		

=== Wagner ===
Wagner Seahawks (5-6) vs. LIU Sharks (5-6) – Game summary

Quarter	1	2	3	4	Total
Seahawks	7	0	10	0	17
Sharks	7	0	7	10	24

at Bethpage Federal Credit Union Stadium • Brookville, NY

- Date: November 22

Statistics	WAG	LIU
First downs		
Total yards		
Rushing yards		
Passing yards		
Passing: Comp–Att–Int		
Time of possession		

Team	Category	Player	Statistics
Wagner	Passing		
Wagner	Rushing		
Wagner	Receiving		
LIU	Passing		
LIU	Rushing		
LIU	Receiving		
