= 2025 Saint Francis Red Flash football team =

American college football season

2025 Saint Francis Red Flash football
- Conference: Northeast Conference
- Record: 0–11 (0–7 NEC)
- Head coach: Chris Villarrial (15th season)
- Offensive coordinator: Marco Pecora (6th season)
- Defensive coordinator: Jacob Craig (2nd season)
- Home stadium: DeGol Field

2025 Northeast Conference football standings
| | Conf. | | | Overall |
| Team | W | | L | W | | L |
|---|---|---|---|---|---|---|
| Central Connecticut $^ | 6 | – | 1 | 8 | – | 5 |
| Duquesne | 5 | – | 2 | 7 | – | 5 |
| Mercyhurst* | 4 | – | 3 | 5 | – | 7 |
| LIU | 4 | – | 3 | 6 | – | 6 |
| Wagner | 4 | – | 3 | 5 | – | 7 |
| Stonehill | 3 | – | 4 | 4 | – | 8 |
| Robert Morris | 2 | – | 5 | 3 | – | 9 |
| New Haven* | 0 | – | 0 | 5 | – | 5 |
| Saint Francis | 0 | – | 7 | 0 | – | 11 |
$ – Conference champion; ^ – FCS playoff participant; * – Ineligible for NEC title and FCS postseason play due to transition from NCAA Division II.; Rankings from STATS Poll

The 2025 Saint Francis Red Flash football team represented Saint Francis University as a member of the Northeast Conference (NEC) during the 2025 NCAA Division I FCS football season. The Red Flash were led by 15th-year head coach Chris Villarrial, and play home games at DeGol Field in Loretto, Pennsylvania. This was the Red Flash's final year competing in the NEC and Division I as a whole before moving down to Division III.

== Preseason ==
=== Preseason coaches' poll ===
The NEC released their preseason coaches' poll on August 4, 2025. The Red Flash were picked to finish in sixth place.

== Schedule ==
| Date | Time | Opponent | Site | TV | Result | Attendance |
|---|---|---|---|---|---|---|
| August 28 | 7:00 p.m. | at Louisiana–Monroe* | Malone Stadium; Monroe, LA | ESPN+ | L 0–29 | 12,459 |
| September 6 | 3:30 p.m. | at Buffalo* | University at Buffalo Stadium; Amherst, NY | ESPN+ | L 6–45 | 15,740 |
| September 13 | 12:00 p.m. | at Central Connecticut | Arute Field; New Britain, CT | NEC Front Row | L 7–31 | 2,211 |
| September 20 | 1:00 p.m. | Delaware State* | DeGol Field; Loretto, PA | NEC Front Row | L 10–39 | 2,007 |
| September 27 | 6:00 p.m. | at Bucknell* | Christy Mathewson-Memorial Stadium; Lewisburg, PA | ESPN+ | L 23–30 | 887 |
| October 11 | 12:00 p.m. | at Duquesne | Rooney Field; Pittsburgh, PA | NEC Front Row | L 7–52 | 2,965 |
| October 25 | 3:00 p.m. | Robert Morris^{†} | DeGol Field; Loretto, PA | NEC Front Row | L 14–24 | 1,381 |
| November 1 | 12:00 p.m. | Wagner | DeGol Field; Loretto, PA | NEC Front Row | L 20–23 | 1,076 |
| November 8 | 12:00 p.m. | Mercyhurst | DeGol Field; Loretto, PA | NEC Front Row | L 15–16 | 987 |
| November 15 | 12:00 p.m. | LIU | DeGol Field; Loretto, PA | NEC Front Row | L 3–10 | 784 |
| November 22 | 1:00 p.m. | at Stonehill | W.B. Mason Stadium; Easton, MA | NEC Front Row | L 10–20 | 1,287 |
*Non-conference game; ^{†}Homecoming; All times are in Eastern time

== Game summaries ==
=== at Louisiana–Monroe (FBS) ===
Game One – Saint Francis Red Flash (0–0) at Louisiana–Monroe Warhawks (FBS) (0–0) – Game summary

| Quarter | 1 | 2 | 3 | 4 | Total |
|---|---|---|---|---|---|
| Red Flash | 0 | 0 | 0 | 0 | 0 |
| Warhawks (FBS) | 7 | 3 | 7 | 12 | 29 |

at Malone Stadium • Monroe, LA

- Date: Thursday August 28, 2025
- Game time: 6:00 p.m.
- Game attendance: 12,459
- Referee: Ted Pitts
- TV announcers (ESPN+): Sean Fox (play-by-play) and Desmund Lighten (analyst)

Game information

First quarter

- ULM – Hunter Herring 1-yard run (Luke Stagg kick), 9:25. Warhawks 7–0. Drive: 6 plays, 81 yards, 2:59.

Second quarter

- ULM – Luke Stagg 32-yard field goal, 1:55. Warhawks 10–0. Drive: 11 plays, 60 yards, 5:03.

Third quarter

- ULM – Braylon McReynolds 13-yard pass from Aidan Armenta (Luke Stagg kick), 9:37. Warhawks 17–0. Drive: 10 plays, 75 yards, 5:23.

Fourth quarter

- ULM – Aidan Armenta 7-yard run (Luke Stagg kick BLOCKED), 12:00. Warhawks 23–0. Drive: 15 plays, 91 yards, 6:40.
- ULM – Tyler Griffin 19-yard pass from Landon Graves (Luke Stagg kick BLOCKED), 4:39. Warhawks 29–0. Drive: 4 plays, 33 yards, 2:05.

| Statistics | SFPA | ULM |
|---|---|---|
| First downs | 7 | 22 |
| Plays–yards | 47–131 | 69–434 |
| Rushes–yards | 27–81 | 43–311 |
| Passing yards | 50 | 123 |
| Passing: Comp–Att–Int | 12–20–1 | 14–26–1 |
| Turnovers | 1 | 1 |
| Time of possession | 29:11 | 30:49 |

| Team | Category | Player | Statistics |
|---|---|---|---|
| Saint Francis (PA) | Passing | Nick Whitfield Jr. | 9/16, 36 yards, INT |
| Saint Francis (PA) | Rushing | Raph Ekechi | 10 carries, 37 yards |
| Saint Francis (PA) | Receiving | Zachary Betts | 2 receptions, 16 yards |
| Louisiana–Monroe | Passing | Aidan Armenta | 12/23, 95 yards, TD, INT |
| Louisiana–Monroe | Rushing | Braylon McReynolds | 11 carries, 113 yards |
| Louisiana–Monroe | Receiving | Tyler Griffin | 3 receptions, 32 yards, TD |

=== at Buffalo (FBS) ===
Saint Francis (PA) Red Flash (0–1) at Buffalo Bulls (FBS) (0–1) – Game summary

| Quarter | 1 | 2 | 3 | 4 | Total |
|---|---|---|---|---|---|
| Red Flash | 0 | 0 | 0 | 6 | 6 |
| Bulls (FBS) | 17 | 7 | 14 | 7 | 45 |

at University at Buffalo Stadium • Amherst, New York

- Date: September 6, 2025
- Game time: 3:30 PM EDT
- Game attendance: 15,740
- Referee: Marcel Kerr
- TV announcers (ESPN+): Anthony Lima (play-by-play) and Randy Buffington (analyst)

Game information

First quarter

- BUFF – Victor Snow 17-yard pass from Ta'Quan Roberson (Jack Howes kick), 12:20. Bulls 7–0. Drive: 4 plays, 27 yards, 1:45.
- BUFF – Jack Howes 27-yard field goal, 7:01. Bulls 10–0. Drive: 9 plays, 56 yards, 3:39.
- BUFF – Al-Jay Henderson 1-yard run (Jack Howes kick), 0:50. Bulls 17–0. Drive: 12 plays, 56 yards, 5:06.

Second quarter

- BUFF – Al-Jay Henderson 10-yard run (Jack Howes kick), 5:31. Bulls 24–0. Drive: 6 plays, 51 yards, 2:42.

Third quarter

- BUFF – Ta'Quan Roberson 40-yard run (Jack Howes kick), 5:07. Bulls 31–0. Drive: 10 plays, 91 yards, 4:09.
- BUFF – Ta'Quan Roberson 4-yard run (Jack Howes kick), 1:01. Bulls 38–0. Drive: 5 plays, 43 yards, 2:10.

Fourth quarter

- SFPA – Jordan Theodore 1-yard run (Mac Plummer kick failed), 10:06. Bulls 38–6. Drive: 7 plays, 29 yards, 2:45.
- BUFF – James McNeil Jr. 26-yard run (Jack Howes kick), 4:52. Bulls 45–6. Drive: 9 plays, 60 yards, 5:14.

| Statistics | SFPA | BUFF |
|---|---|---|
| First downs | 7 | 32 |
| Plays–yards | 52–119 | 85–503 |
| Rushes–yards | 21–4 | 63–370 |
| Passing yards | 115 | 133 |
| Passing: Comp–Att–Int | 18–31–0 | 11–22–2 |
| Turnovers | 1 | 2 |
| Time of possession | 22:41 | 37:19 |

| Team | Category | Player | Statistics |
|---|---|---|---|
| Saint Francis (PA) | Passing | Nick Whitfield Jr. | 17/27, 111 yards |
| Saint Francis (PA) | Rushing | Raph Ekechi | 8 carries, 21 yards |
| Saint Francis (PA) | Receiving | Peyton Nelson | 4 receptions, 34 yards |
| Buffalo | Passing | Ta'Quan Roberson | 10/20, 133 yards, TD, INT |
| Buffalo | Rushing | Al-Jay Henderson | 24 carries, 98 yards, 2 TD |
| Buffalo | Receiving | Victor Snow | 3 receptions, 67 yards, TD |

=== at Central Connecticut ===
Saint Francis Red Flash (0-2) at Central Connecticut Blue Devils (1-1) – Game summary

| Quarter | 1 | 2 | 3 | 4 | Total |
|---|---|---|---|---|---|
| Red Flash | - | - | - | - | 0 |
| Blue Devils | - | - | - | - | 0 |

at Arute Field • New Britain, CT

- Date: September 13
- Game time: 12:00 PM EDT
- TV: NEC Front Row

| Statistics | SFPA | CCSU |
|---|---|---|
| First downs | | |
| Total yards | | |
| Rushing yards | | |
| Passing yards | | |
| Passing: Comp–Att–Int | | |
| Time of possession | | |

| Team | Category | Player | Statistics |
|---|---|---|---|
| Saint Francis (PA) | Passing | | |
| Saint Francis (PA) | Rushing | | |
| Saint Francis (PA) | Receiving | | |
| Central Connecticut | Passing | | |
| Central Connecticut | Rushing | | |
| Central Connecticut | Receiving | | |

=== Delaware State ===
Delaware State Hornets (2-1) at Saint Francis Red Flash (0-3) – Game summary

| Quarter | 1 | 2 | 3 | 4 | Total |
|---|---|---|---|---|---|
| Hornets | 13 | 13 | 0 | 13 | 39 |
| Red Flash | 0 | 3 | 7 | 0 | 10 |

at DeGol Field • Loretto, PA

- Date: September 20
- Game time: 1:00 p.m. EDT
- Game weather: Sunny
- Game attendance: 2,007
- Referee: Travis Barta
- TV announcers (NEC Front Row): Pat Farabaugh (play-by-play) and Jay Roberts (analyst)

Game information

First Quarter

- (7:23) DSU – Marquis Gillis 3-yard run (Drive: 14 plays, 65 yards, 5:31; Delaware State 6–0)
- (0:13) DSU – James Jones 1-yard run, Patrick Fisher-Butler kick (Drive: 11 plays, 73 yards, 4:53; Delaware State 13–0)

Second Quarter

- (13:48) DSU – James Jones 90-yard run, Patrick Fisher-Butler kick (Drive: 1 play, 90 yards, 0:12; Delaware State 20–0)
- (9:49) SFU – Mac Plummer 25-yard field goal (Drive: 8 plays, 56 yards, 3:52; Delaware State 20–3)
- (0:48) DSU – Dasheen Jackson 1-yard run (Drive: 11 plays, 69 yards, 3:48; Delaware State 26–3)

Third Quarter

- (9:26) SFU – Kameron Chisholm 1-yard pass from Nick Whitfield Jr., Mac Plummer kick (Drive: 8 plays, 51 yards, 4:37; Delaware State 26–10)

Fourth Quarter

- (1:37) DSU – Kaiden Bennett 21-yard run, Patrick Fisher-Butler kick (Drive: 9 plays, 80 yards, 4:30; Delaware State 33–10)
- (0:00) DSU – Kaiden Bennett 1-yard run (Drive: 6 plays, 22 yards, 1:23; Delaware State 39–10)

| Statistics | DSU | SFPA |
|---|---|---|
| First downs | 23 | 16 |
| Total yards | 384 | 333 |
| Rushing yards | 292 | 62 |
| Passing yards | 92 | 271 |
| Passing: Comp–Att–Int | 8–21–1 | 26–36–2 |
| Time of possession | 32:04 | 27:16 |

| Team | Category | Player | Statistics |
|---|---|---|---|
| Delaware State | Passing | Kaiden Bennett | 8/21, 92 yards, INT |
| Delaware State | Rushing | James Jones | 8 carries, 137 yards, 2 TD |
| Delaware State | Receiving | Kyree Benton | 1 reception, 39 yards |
| Saint Francis (PA) | Passing | Nick Whitfield Jr. | 26/36, 271 yards, TD, 2 INT |
| Saint Francis (PA) | Rushing | Nick Whitfield Jr. | 6 carries, 28 yards |
| Saint Francis (PA) | Receiving | Brenden Hodge | 9 receptions, 131 yards |

=== at Bucknell ===
Saint Francis Red Flash (0-4) vs. Bucknell Bison (2-2) – Game summary

| Quarter | 1 | 2 | 3 | 4 | Total |
|---|---|---|---|---|---|
| Red Flash | 0 | 14 | 3 | 6 | 23 |
| Bison | 7 | 3 | 12 | 8 | 30 |

at Christy Mathewson-Memorial Stadium • Lewisburg, PA

- Date: September 27
- Game time: 6:00 PM EDT
- TV announcers (ESPN+): Doug Birdsong (play-by-play) and Charle Fisher (analyst)

| Statistics | SFPA | BUCK |
|---|---|---|
| First downs | | |
| Total yards | | |
| Rushing yards | | |
| Passing yards | | |
| Passing: Comp–Att–Int | | |
| Time of possession | | |

| Team | Category | Player | Statistics |
|---|---|---|---|
| Saint Francis (PA) | Passing | | |
| Saint Francis (PA) | Rushing | | |
| Saint Francis (PA) | Receiving | | |
| Bucknell | Passing | | |
| Bucknell | Rushing | | |
| Bucknell | Receiving | | |

=== at Duquesne ===
Saint Francis Red Flash (0-5) vs. Duquesne Dukes (3-3) – Game summary

| Quarter | 1 | 2 | 3 | 4 | Total |
|---|---|---|---|---|---|
| Red Flash | 0 | 0 | 0 | 7 | 7 |
| Dukes | 28 | 17 | 7 | 0 | 52 |

at Rooney Field • Pittsburgh, PA

- Date: October 11
- Game time: 12:00 PM EDT
- TV announcers (NEC Front Row): Tim Benz (play-by-play) and Ellis Cannon (analyst)

| Statistics | SFPA | DUQ |
|---|---|---|
| First downs | | |
| Total yards | | |
| Rushing yards | | |
| Passing yards | | |
| Passing: Comp–Att–Int | | |
| Time of possession | | |

| Team | Category | Player | Statistics |
|---|---|---|---|
| Saint Francis (PA) | Passing | | |
| Saint Francis (PA) | Rushing | | |
| Saint Francis (PA) | Receiving | | |
| Duquesne | Passing | | |
| Duquesne | Rushing | | |
| Duquesne | Receiving | | |

=== Robert Morris ===
Robert Morris Colonials (1-6) vs. Saint Francis Red Flash (0-6) – Game summary

| Quarter | 1 | 2 | 3 | 4 | Total |
|---|---|---|---|---|---|
| Colonials | - | - | - | - | 0 |
| Red Flash | - | - | - | - | 0 |

at DeGol Field • Loretto, PA

- Date: October 25
- Game time: 3:00 p.m. EDT
- TV: NEC Front Row

| Statistics | RMU | SFPA |
|---|---|---|
| First downs | | |
| Total yards | | |
| Rushing yards | | |
| Passing yards | | |
| Passing: Comp–Att–Int | | |
| Time of possession | | |

| Team | Category | Player | Statistics |
|---|---|---|---|
| Robert Morris | Passing | | |
| Robert Morris | Rushing | | |
| Robert Morris | Receiving | | |
| Saint Francis (PA) | Passing | | |
| Saint Francis (PA) | Rushing | | |
| Saint Francis (PA) | Receiving | | |

=== Wagner ===
Wagner Seahawks (2-6) vs. Saint Francis Red Flash (0-7) – Game summary

| Quarter | 1 | 2 | 3 | 4 | Total |
|---|---|---|---|---|---|
| Seahawks | - | - | - | - | 0 |
| Red Flash | - | - | - | - | 0 |

at DeGol Field • Loretto, PA

- Date: November 1

| Statistics | WAG | SFPA |
|---|---|---|
| First downs | | |
| Total yards | | |
| Rushing yards | | |
| Passing yards | | |
| Passing: Comp–Att–Int | | |
| Time of possession | | |

| Team | Category | Player | Statistics |
|---|---|---|---|
| Wagner | Passing | | |
| Wagner | Rushing | | |
| Wagner | Receiving | | |
| Saint Francis (PA) | Passing | | |
| Saint Francis (PA) | Rushing | | |
| Saint Francis (PA) | Receiving | | |

=== Mercyhurst ===
Mercyhurst Lakers (3-6) vs. Saint Francis Red Flash (0-8) – Game summary

| Quarter | 1 | 2 | 3 | 4 | Total |
|---|---|---|---|---|---|
| Lakers | - | - | - | - | 0 |
| Red Flash | - | - | - | - | 0 |

at DeGol Field • Loretto, PA

- Date: November 8

| Statistics | MERC | SFPA |
|---|---|---|
| First downs | | |
| Total yards | | |
| Rushing yards | | |
| Passing yards | | |
| Passing: Comp–Att–Int | | |
| Time of possession | | |

| Team | Category | Player | Statistics |
|---|---|---|---|
| Mercyhurst | Passing | | |
| Mercyhurst | Rushing | | |
| Mercyhurst | Receiving | | |
| Saint Francis (PA) | Passing | | |
| Saint Francis (PA) | Rushing | | |
| Saint Francis (PA) | Receiving | | |

=== LIU ===
LIU Sharks (0-0) vs. Saint Francis Red Flash (0-0) – Game summary

| Quarter | 1 | 2 | 3 | 4 | Total |
|---|---|---|---|---|---|
| Sharks | - | - | - | - | 0 |
| Red Flash | - | - | - | - | 0 |

at DeGol Field • Loretto, PA

- Date: November 15

| Statistics | LIU | SFPA |
|---|---|---|
| First downs | | |
| Total yards | | |
| Rushing yards | | |
| Passing yards | | |
| Passing: Comp–Att–Int | | |
| Time of possession | | |

| Team | Category | Player | Statistics |
|---|---|---|---|
| LIU | Passing | | |
| LIU | Rushing | | |
| LIU | Receiving | | |
| Saint Francis (PA) | Passing | | |
| Saint Francis (PA) | Rushing | | |
| Saint Francis (PA) | Receiving | | |

=== at Stonehill ===
Saint Francis Red Flash (0-0) vs. Stonehill Skyhawks (0-0) – Game summary

| Quarter | 1 | 2 | 3 | 4 | Total |
|---|---|---|---|---|---|
| Red Flash | - | - | - | - | 0 |
| Skyhawks | - | - | - | - | 0 |

at W.B. Mason Stadium • Easton, MA

- Date: November 22
- Game time: 1:00 PM EST

| Statistics | SFPA | STO |
|---|---|---|
| First downs | | |
| Total yards | | |
| Rushing yards | | |
| Passing yards | | |
| Passing: Comp–Att–Int | | |
| Time of possession | | |

| Team | Category | Player | Statistics |
|---|---|---|---|
| Saint Francis (PA) | Passing | | |
| Saint Francis (PA) | Rushing | | |
| Saint Francis (PA) | Receiving | | |
| Stonehill | Passing | | |
| Stonehill | Rushing | | |
| Stonehill | Receiving | | |
