= 2025 Wagner Seahawks football team =

American college football season

2025 Wagner Seahawks football
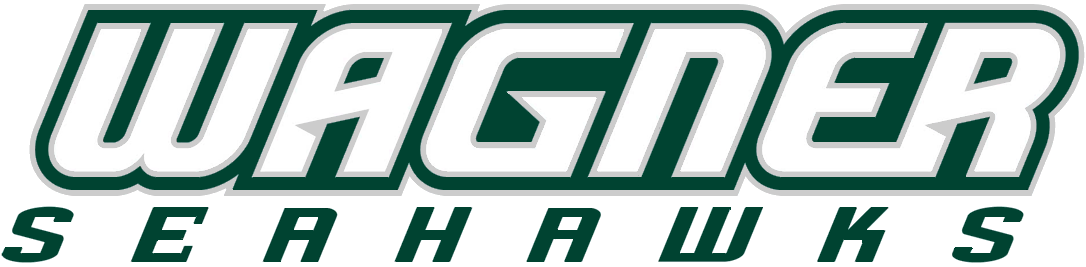
- Conference: Northeast Conference
- Record: 5–7 (4–3 NEC)
- Head coach: Tom Masella (6th season)
- Offensive coordinator: Terence Sino (1st season)
- Defensive coordinator: Derek Getchell (2nd season)
- Home stadium: Wagner College Stadium

2025 Northeast Conference football standings
	Conf.			Overall
Team	W		L	W		L
Central Connecticut $^	6	–	1	8	–	5
Duquesne	5	–	2	7	–	5
Mercyhurst*	4	–	3	5	–	7
LIU	4	–	3	6	–	6
Wagner	4	–	3	5	–	7
Stonehill	3	–	4	4	–	8
Robert Morris	2	–	5	3	–	9
New Haven*	0	–	0	5	–	5
Saint Francis	0	–	7	0	–	11
$ – Conference champion; ^ – FCS playoff participant; * – Ineligible for NEC title and FCS postseason play due to transition from NCAA Division II.; Rankings from STATS Poll

The 2025 Wagner Seahawks football team represented Wagner College as a member of the Northeast Conference (NEC) during the 2025 NCAA Division I FCS football season. The Seahawks were led by sixth-year head coach Tom Masella, and played their home games at Wagner College Stadium in Staten Island, New York.

== Preseason ==
=== Preseason coaches' poll ===
The NEC released their preseason coaches' poll on August 4, 2025. The Seahawks were picked to finish in fifth place.

== Schedule ==
Date	Time	Opponent	Site	TV	Result	Attendance
August 29	7:30 p.m.	at Kansas*	David Booth Kansas Memorial Stadium; Lawrence, KS	ESPN+	L 7–46	39,129
September 6	1:00 p.m.	at Georgetown*	Cooper Field; Washington, DC	ESPN+	L 20–31	1,276
September 13	1:00 p.m.	Marist*	Wagner College Stadium; Staten Island, NY	NEC Front Row	L 10–21	3,167
September 20	1:00 p.m.	at Central Michigan*	Kelly/Shorts Stadium; Mount Pleasant, MI	ESPN+	L 10–49	18,787
September 27	12:00 p.m.	Norfolk State*	Wagner College Stadium; Staten Island, NY	ESPN+	W 18–13	3,135
October 11	12:00 p.m.	Mercyhurst*	Wagner College Stadium; Staten Island, NY	NEC Front Row	L 7–19	1,123
October 18	5:00 p.m.	Central Connecticut^{†}	Wagner College Stadium; Staten Island, NY	NEC Front Row	L 17–24 ^{OT}	2,468
October 25	12:00 p.m.	Duquesne	Wagner College Stadium; Staten Island, NY	ESPN+/YES	W 24–13	2,873
November 1	12:00 p.m.	at Saint Francis	DeGol Field; Loretto, PA	NEC Front Row	W 23–20	1,076
November 8	12:00 p.m.	at Robert Morris	Joe Walton Stadium; Moon Township, PA	NEC Front Row	W 24–20	1,267
November 15	12:00 p.m.	Stonehill	Wagner College Stadium; Staten Island, NY	NEC Front Row	W 20–14	857
November 22	12:00 p.m.	at LIU	Bethpage Federal Credit Union Stadium; Brookville, NY	NEC Front Row	L 17–24	1,013
*Non-conference game; ^{†}Homecoming; All times are in Eastern time

== Game summaries ==
=== at Kansas (FBS) ===
Wagner Seahawks (0–0) at Kansas Jayhawks (FBS) (1–0) – Game summary

Quarter	1	2	3	4	Total
Seahawks	0	7	0	0	7
Jayhawks (FBS)	14	15	10	7	46

at David Booth Kansas Memorial Stadium • Lawrence, Kansas

- Date: August 29
- Game time: 6:30 p.m.
- Game weather: Sunny, 79°F (26°C), wind SE 6mph
- Game attendance: 39,129
- Referee: Luke Richmond
- TV announcers (ESPN+): Mark Neely (play-by-play) and Todd Doxson (analyst)

Game information

First quarter

- (11:14) KU - DeShawn Hanika 4-yard pass from Jalon Daniels (Laith Marjan kick) (Drive: 6 plays, 50 yards, 1:45; Kansas 7-0)
- (3:12) KU - Emmanuel Henderson 9-yard pass from Jalon Daniels (Laith Marjan kick) (Drive: 8 plays, 63 yards, 3:32; Kansas 14-0)

Second quarter

- (13:06) KU - Cam Pickett 20-yard pass from Jalon Daniels (Carson Bruhn 2-pt run) (Drive: 8 plays, 78 yards, 2:43; Kansas 22-0)
- (5:19) KU - Daniel Hishaw Jr. 20-yard run (Laith Marjan kick) (Drive: 5 plays, 68 yards, 2:07; Kansas 29-0)
- (1:52) WAG - Jeremiah Colclough 45-yard pass from Jack Stevens (Nicholas Romero kick) (Drive: 8 plays, 75 yards, 3:27; Kansas 29-7)

Third quarter

- (14:11) KU - Emmanuel Henderson 62-yard pass from Jalon Daniels (Laith Marjan kick) (Drive: 2 plays, 75 yards, 0:49; Kansas 36-7)
- (6:50) KU - Laith Marjan 27-yard field goal (Drive: 10 plays, 60 yards, 4:53; Kansas 39-7)

Fourth quarter

- (3:40) KU - Harry Stewart III 1-yard run (Dane Efird kick) (Drive: 9 plays, 50 yards, 5:56; Kansas 46-7)

Statistics	WAG	KU
First downs	6	32
Plays–yards	48-143	78-631
Rushes–yards	28-53	44-285
Passing yards	90	346
Passing: comp–att–int	13-20-0	23-34-1
Turnovers	0	2
Time of possession	26:45	33:15

Team	Category	Player	Statistics
Wagner	Passing	Jack Stevens	13/20, 90 yards, TD
Wagner	Rushing	Andre Hines Jr.	8 carries, 25 yards
Wagner	Receiving	Jeremiah Colclough	1 reception, 45 yards, TD
Kansas	Passing	Jalon Daniels	18/25, 280 yards, 4 TD, INT
Kansas	Rushing	Daniel Hishaw Jr.	14 carries, 89 yards, TD
Kansas	Receiving	Emmanuel Henderson	6 receptions, 130 yards, 2 TD

=== at Georgetown ===
Wagner Seahawks (0-1) at Georgetown Hoyas (1-0) – Game summary

Quarter	1	2	3	4	Total
Seahawks	-	-	-	-	0
Hoyas	-	-	-	-	0

at Cooper Field • Washington, DC

- Date: September 6
- Game time: 1:00 PM EDT
- TV announcers (ESPN+): Jeremy Huber (play-by-play) and Derwin Gray (analyst)

Statistics	WAG	GTWN
First downs		
Total yards		
Rushing yards		
Passing yards		
Passing: Comp–Att–Int		
Time of possession		

Team	Category	Player	Statistics
Wagner	Passing		
Wagner	Rushing		
Wagner	Receiving		
Georgetown	Passing		
Georgetown	Rushing		
Georgetown	Receiving		

=== Marist ===
Marist Red Foxes (1-1) vs. Wagner Seahawks (0-2) – Game summary

Quarter	1	2	3	4	Total
Red Foxes	-	-	-	-	0
Seahawks	-	-	-	-	0

at Wagner College Stadium • New York City, NY

- Date: September 13
- Game time: 1:00 PM EDT
- TV announcers (NEC Front Row): Marc Ernay (play-by-play) and Craig D'Amico (analyst)

Statistics	MRST	WAG
First downs		
Total yards		
Rushing yards		
Passing yards		
Passing: Comp–Att–Int		
Time of possession		

Team	Category	Player	Statistics
Marist	Passing		
Marist	Rushing		
Marist	Receiving		
Wagner	Passing		
Wagner	Rushing		
Wagner	Receiving		

=== at Central Michigan (FBS) ===
Wagner Seahawks (0-3) at Central Michigan Chippewas (FBS) (1-2) – Game summary

Quarter	1	2	3	4	Total
Seahawks	0	3	0	7	10
Chippewas (FBS)	14	21	14	0	49

at Kelly/Shorts Stadium • Mount Pleasant, MI

- Date: September 20
- Game time: 1:00 PM EDT
- Game weather: Sunny • Temperature: 73 °F (23 °C) • Wind: NW at 8 miles per hour (13 km/h)
- Game attendance: 18,787
- Referee: Chris La Mange
- TV announcers (ESPN+): Evan Stockton (play-by-play) and Doc Holliday (analyst) and Sam Ramos (sideline)

Game information

First quarter

- CMU – Dakota Cochran 30-yard interception return (Cade Graham kick), 14:20. Chippewas 7–0. Drive: , 0:40.
- CMU – Angel Flores 2-yard run (Cade Graham kick), 08:15. Chippewas 14–0. Drive: 6 plays, 36 yards, 3:34.

Second quarter

- WAG – Nicholas Romero 33-yard field goal, 08:34. Chippewas 14–3. Drive: 11 plays, 55 yards, 5:07.
- CMU – Nahree Biggins 88-yard pass from Joe Labas (Cade Graham kick), 08:22. Chippewas 21–3. Drive: 1 play, 88 yards, 0:12.
- CMU – Tommy McIntosh 33-yard pass from Joe Labas (Cade Graham kick), 01:41. Chippewas 28–3. Drive: 7 plays, 62 yards, 2:59.
- CMU – Tyson Davis 33-yard pass from Joe Labas (Cade Graham kick), 00:16. Chippewas 35–3. Drive: 7 plays, 80 yards, 0:59.

Third quarter

- CMU – Brock Townsend 22-yard pass from Angel Flores (Cade Graham kick), 05:43. Chippewas 42–3. Drive: 10 plays, 65 yards, 5:45.
- CMU – Angel Flores 3-yard run (Cade Graham kick), 02:54. Chippewas 49–3. Drive: 3 plays, 33 yards, 1:15.

Fourth quarter

- WAG – A. Bailey 75-yard fumble return (Nicholas Romero kick), 13:56. Chippewas 49–10. Drive: , 1:44.

Statistics	WAG	CMU
First downs	7	24
Plays–yards	55–113	66–506
Rushes–yards	35–72	48–233
Passing yards	41	273
Passing: comp–att–int	12–20–1	14–18–0
Turnovers	2	2
Time of possession	27:37	32:23

Team	Category	Player	Statistics
Wagner	Passing	Jordan Barton	7/12, 18 yards
Wagner	Rushing	Matt Morad	9 carries, 35 yards
Wagner	Receiving	Richard Perkins Jr.	3 receptions, 9 yards
Central Michigan	Passing	Joe Labas	12/14, 241 yards, 3 TD
Central Michigan	Rushing	Trey Cornist	11 carries, 52 yards
Central Michigan	Receiving	Nahree Biggins	3 receptions, 106 yards, TD

=== Norfolk State ===
Norfolk State Spartans (1-3) vs. Wagner Seahawks (0-4) – Game summary

Quarter	1	2	3	4	Total
Spartans	13	0	0	0	13
Seahawks	0	0	12	6	18

at Wagner College Stadium • New York City, NY

- Date: September 27
- Game time: 12:00 PM EDT
- Game weather: Sunny • Temperature: 80 °F (27 °C)
- Game attendance: 3,135
- Referee: Michael Quinn
- TV announcers (NEC Front Row): Marc Ernay (play-by-play) and Ray Martel (analyst)

Game information

First Quarter

- (13:04) NORF – X'Zavion Evans 14-yard run, Evan Helfrich PAT failed (Drive: 3 plays, 29 yards, 1:10; Norfolk State 6-0)
- (11:32) NORF – Kevon King 1-yard run, Marco Peery kick (Drive: 4 plays, 46 yards, 0:54; Norfolk State 13-0)

Second Quarter

No scoring plays

Third Quarter

- (5:37) WAG – Andre Hines Jr. 1-yard run, Nicholas Romero PAT failed (Drive: 8 plays, 41 yards, 3:29; Norfolk State 13-6)
- (2:41) WAG – Malik Redd 62-yard pass from Jordan Barton, Nicholas Romero PAT failed (Drive: 3 plays, 73 yards, 1:12; Norfolk State 13-12)

Fourth Quarter

- (11:30) WAG – Johans Bars 24-yard pass from Jordan Barton, Two-point pass conversion failed (Drive: 10 plays, 80 yards, 3:44; Wagner 18-12)

Statistics	NORF	WAG
First downs	19	22
Total yards	288	398
Rushing yards	140	215
Passing yards	148	183
Passing: Comp–Att–Int	22–37–2	14–22–2
Time of possession	29:48	30:12

Team	Category	Player	Statistics
Norfolk State	Passing	Otto Kuhns	17/28, 119 yards, INT
Norfolk State	Rushing	Kevon King	14 carries, 48 yards, TD
Norfolk State	Receiving	DreSean Kendrick	5 receptions, 33 yards
Wagner	Passing	Jordan Barton	14/22, 183 yards, 2 TD, 2 INT
Wagner	Rushing	Andre Hines Jr.	22 carries, 108 yards, TD
Wagner	Receiving	Malik Redd	3 receptions, 89 yards, TD

=== Mercyhurst ===
Mercyhurst Lakers (2-4) vs. Wagner Seahawks (1-4) – Game summary

Quarter	1	2	3	4	Total
Lakers	0	12	7	0	19
Seahawks	0	7	0	0	7

at Wagner College Stadium • New York City, NY

- Date: October 11
- Game time: 12:00 PM EDT
- TV: NEC Front Row

Statistics	MERC	WAG
First downs		
Total yards		
Rushing yards		
Passing yards		
Passing: Comp–Att–Int		
Time of possession		

Team	Category	Player	Statistics
Mercyhurst	Passing		
Mercyhurst	Rushing		
Mercyhurst	Receiving		
Wagner	Passing		
Wagner	Rushing		
Wagner	Receiving		

=== Central Connecticut ===
Central Connecticut Blue Devils (4-3) vs. Wagner Seahawks (1-5) – Game summary

Quarter	1	2	3	4	Total
Blue Devils	-	-	-	-	0
Seahawks	-	-	-	-	0

at Wagner College Stadium • New York City, NY

- Date: October 18
- Game time: 5:00 PM EDT

Statistics	CCSU	WAG
First downs		
Total yards		
Rushing yards		
Passing yards		
Passing: Comp–Att–Int		
Time of possession		

Team	Category	Player	Statistics
Central Connecticut	Passing		
Central Connecticut	Rushing		
Central Connecticut	Receiving		
Wagner	Passing		
Wagner	Rushing		
Wagner	Receiving		

=== Duquesne ===
Duquesne Dukes (5-3) vs. Wagner Seahawks (1-6) – Game summary

Quarter	1	2	3	4	Total
Dukes	-	-	-	-	0
Seahawks	-	-	-	-	0

at Wagner College Stadium • New York City, NY

- Date: October 25
- Game time: 12:00 PM EDT
- TV announcers (ESPN+/YES): Paul Dottino (play-by-play) and Kevin Gilbride (analyst)

Statistics	DUQ	WAG
First downs		
Total yards		
Rushing yards		
Passing yards		
Passing: Comp–Att–Int		
Time of possession		

Team	Category	Player	Statistics
Duquesne	Passing		
Duquesne	Rushing		
Duquesne	Receiving		
Wagner	Passing		
Wagner	Rushing		
Wagner	Receiving		

=== at Saint Francis (PA) ===
Wagner Seahawks (2-6) vs. Saint Francis Red Flash (0-7) – Game summary

Quarter	1	2	3	4	Total
Seahawks	-	-	-	-	0
Red Flash	-	-	-	-	0

at DeGol Field • Loretto, PA

- Date: November 1

Statistics	WAG	SFPA
First downs		
Total yards		
Rushing yards		
Passing yards		
Passing: Comp–Att–Int		
Time of possession		

Team	Category	Player	Statistics
Wagner	Passing		
Wagner	Rushing		
Wagner	Receiving		
Saint Francis (PA)	Passing		
Saint Francis (PA)	Rushing		
Saint Francis (PA)	Receiving		

=== at Robert Morris ===
Wagner Seahawks (3-6) vs. Robert Morris Colonials (3-6) – Game summary

Quarter	1	2	3	4	Total
Seahawks	-	-	-	-	0
Colonials	-	-	-	-	0

at Joe Walton Stadium • Moon Township, PA

- Date: November 8
- Game time: 12:00 PM EST
- TV: NEC Front Row

Statistics	WAG	RMU
First downs		
Total yards		
Rushing yards		
Passing yards		
Passing: Comp–Att–Int		
Time of possession		

Team	Category	Player	Statistics
Wagner	Passing		
Wagner	Rushing		
Wagner	Receiving		
Robert Morris	Passing		
Robert Morris	Rushing		
Robert Morris	Receiving		

=== Stonehill ===
Stonehill Skyhawks (0-0) vs. Wagner Seahawks (0-0) – Game summary

Quarter	1	2	3	4	Total
Skyhawks	-	-	-	-	0
Seahawks	-	-	-	-	0

at Wagner College Stadium • New York City, NY

- Date: November 15
- Game time: 12:00 PM EST

Statistics	STO	WAG
First downs		
Total yards		
Rushing yards		
Passing yards		
Passing: Comp–Att–Int		
Time of possession		

Team	Category	Player	Statistics
Stonehill	Passing		
Stonehill	Rushing		
Stonehill	Receiving		
Wagner	Passing		
Wagner	Rushing		
Wagner	Receiving		

=== at LIU ===
Wagner Seahawks (0-0) vs. LIU Sharks (0-0) – Game summary

Quarter	1	2	3	4	Total
Seahawks	-	-	-	-	0
Sharks	-	-	-	-	0

at Bethpage Federal Credit Union Stadium • Brookville, NY

- Date: November 22

Statistics	WAG	LIU
First downs		
Total yards		
Rushing yards		
Passing yards		
Passing: Comp–Att–Int		
Time of possession		

Team	Category	Player	Statistics
Wagner	Passing		
Wagner	Rushing		
Wagner	Receiving		
LIU	Passing		
LIU	Rushing		
LIU	Receiving		
