= 2025 Mercyhurst Lakers football team =

American college football season

2025 Mercyhurst Lakers football
- Conference: Northeast Conference
- Record: 5–7 (4–3 NEC)
- Head coach: Ryan Riemedio (4th season)
- Offensive coordinator: Thomas Sydeski (2nd season)
- Home stadium: Saxon Stadium

2025 Northeast Conference football standings
	Conf.			Overall
Team	W		L	W		L
Central Connecticut $^	6	–	1	8	–	5
Duquesne	5	–	2	7	–	5
Mercyhurst*	4	–	3	5	–	7
LIU	4	–	3	6	–	6
Wagner	4	–	3	5	–	7
Stonehill	3	–	4	4	–	8
Robert Morris	2	–	5	3	–	9
New Haven*	0	–	0	5	–	5
Saint Francis	0	–	7	0	–	11
$ – Conference champion; ^ – FCS playoff participant; * – Ineligible for NEC title and FCS postseason play due to transition from NCAA Division II.; Rankings from STATS Poll

The 2025 Mercyhurst Lakers football team represented Mercyhurst University as a member of the Northeast Conference (NEC) during the 2025 NCAA Division I FCS football season.

== Preseason ==
=== Preseason coaches' poll ===
The NEC released their preseason coaches' poll on August 4, 2025. The Lakers were picked to finish in seventh place.

== Schedule ==
Date	Time	Opponent	Site	TV	Result	Attendance
August 28	6:00 p.m.	at Youngstown State*	Stambaugh Stadium; Youngstown, OH	ESPN+	L 15–24	7,040
September 6	12:00 p.m.	New Haven*	Saxon Stadium; Erie, PA	NEC Front Row	W 48–14	777
September 13	9:00 p.m.	at No. 21 Sacramento State*	Hornet Stadium; Sacramento, CA	ESPN+	L 28–49	12,231
September 20	3:00 p.m.	at No. 4 Montana State*	Bobcat Stadium; Bozeman, MT	ESPN+	L 0–17	21,317
September 27	3:00 p.m.	at No. 2 South Dakota State*	Dana J. Dykhouse Stadium; Brookings, SD	ESPN+	L 7–51	19,034
October 4	1:00 p.m.	LIU	Saxon Stadium; Erie, PA	ESPN+	W 22–13	2,100
October 11	12:00 p.m.	at Wagner	Wagner College Stadium; Staten Island, NY	NEC Front Row	W 19–7	1,123
October 18	6:00 p.m.	Duquesne	Saxon Stadium; Erie, PA	NEC Front Row	L 0–37	2,213
October 25	12:00 p.m.	Stonehill	Saxon Stadium; Erie, PA	NEC Front Row	L 15–22	1,257
November 8	12:00 p.m.	at Saint Francis (PA)	DeGol Field; Loretto, PA	NEC Front Row	W 16–15	987
November 15	12:00 p.m.	Robert Morris	Saxon Stadium; Erie, PA	NEC Front Row	W 27-13	857
November 22	12:00 p.m.	at Central Connecticut	Arute Field; New Britain, CT	NEC Front Row	L 28-35	2,015
*Non-conference game; Rankings from STATS Poll released prior to the game; All times are in Eastern time; Source:

== Game summaries ==
=== at Youngstown State ===
Mercyhurst Lakers (0–0) at Youngstown State Penguins (0–0) – Game summary

Quarter	1	2	3	4	Total
Lakers	7	0	0	8	15
No. RV Penguins	7	14	3	0	24

at Stambaugh Stadium, Youngstown, OH

- Date: August 28
- Game time: 6:00 PM EDT
- Game weather: Rain • Temperature: 65 °F (18 °C) • Wind: SW at 10 miles per hour (16 km/h)
- Game attendance: 7,040
- Referee: Jason Perkins
- TV announcers (ESPN+): Drae Smith (play-by-play) and Chris Sammarone (analyst)

Game information

First quarter

- YSU – Jaden Gilbert 1-yard run (Andrew Lastovka kick), 9:24. Penguins 7–0. Drive: 11 plays, 69 yards, 5:29.
- MERC – Evan Van Dyke 1-yard pass from Adam Urena (Max Young kick), 1:08. Tied 7–7. Drive: 14 plays, 81 yards, 8:08.

Second quarter

- YSU – Beau Brungard 4-yard run (Andrew Lastovka kick), 11:17. Penguins 14–7. Drive: 11 plays, 47 yards, 4:42.
- YSU – Beau Brungard 4-yard run (Andrew Lastovka kick), 8:54. Penguins 21–7. Drive: 3 plays, 50 yards, 0:47.

Third quarter

- YSU – Andrew Lastovka 37-yard field goal, 11:10. Penguins 24–7. Drive: 6 plays, 13 yards, 3:04.

Fourth quarter

- MERC – Dylan Evans 8-yard pass from Adam Urena (Adam Urena pass to Dylan Evans), 6:59. Penguins 24–15. Drive: 15 plays, 84 yards, 7:14.

Statistics	MERC	YSU
First downs	20	16
Total yards	374	301
Rushing yards	63	187
Passing yards	311	114
Passing: Comp–Att–Int	32–48–2	14–21–0
Time of possession	34:14	25:46

Team	Category	Player	Statistics
Mercyhurst	Passing	Adam Urena	32/48, 311 yards, 2 TD, 2 INT
Mercyhurst	Rushing	Brian Trobel	7 carries, 40 yards
Mercyhurst	Receiving	Dylan Evans	7 receptions, 95 yards, TD
Youngstown State	Passing	Beau Brungard	14/21, 114 yards
Youngstown State	Rushing	Beau Brungard	28 carries, 145 yards, 2 TD
Youngstown State	Receiving	Max Tomczak	2 receptions, 43 yards

=== New Haven ===
New Haven Chargers (0-1) vs. Mercyhurst Lakers (0-1) – Game summary

Quarter	1	2	3	4	Total
Chargers	7	0	0	7	14
Lakers	13	14	14	7	48

at Saxon Stadium • Erie, PA

- Date: September 6
- Game time: 12:00 p.m. EDT
- Game weather: Sunny • Temperature: 63 °F (17 °C)
- Game attendance: 777
- Referee: Travis Barta
- TV: NEC Front Row

Game information

First Quarter

- (11:32) MERC – Rylan Davison 0-yard pass from Adam Urena, Max Young kick (Drive: 7 plays, 83 yards, 3:22; Mercyhurst 7–0)
- (8:05) NH – Joshua Tracey 16-yard pass from AJ Duffy, Liam Quigley kick (Drive: 8 plays, 76 yards, 3:22; Tied 7–7)
- (5:16) MERC – Brian Trobel 6-yard run (Drive: 5 plays, 75 yards, 2:49; Mercyhurst 13–7)

Second Quarter

- (13:35) MERC – Dylan Evans 8-yard run, Max Young kick (Drive: 9 plays, 86 yards, 4:53; Mercyhurst 20–7)
- (1:13) MERC – Ayron Rodriguez 17-yard run, Max Young kick (Drive: 8 plays, 59 yards, 4:07; Mercyhurst 27–7)

Third Quarter

- (7:32) MERC – Brian Trobel 2-yard run, Max Young kick (Drive: 9 plays, 80 yards, 4:26; Mercyhurst 34–7)
- (4:20) MERC – Brian Trobel 31-yard run, Max Young kick (Drive: 4 plays, 54 yards, 1:20; Mercyhurst 41–7)

Fourth Quarter

- (12:20) MERC – Ashton Wilson 1-yard pass from Adam Urena, Max Young kick (Drive: 11 plays, 78 yards, 5:22; Mercyhurst 48–7)
- (9:36) NH – AJ Duffy 1-yard run, Liam Quigley kick (Drive: 7 plays, 75 yards, 2:44; Mercyhurst 48–14)

Statistics	NH	MERC
First downs	13	30
Total yards	230	647
Rushing yards	47	268
Passing yards	183	379
Passing: Comp–Att–Int	18–35–1	26–34–1
Time of possession	20:52	39:08

Team	Category	Player	Statistics
New Haven	Passing	AJ Duffy	18/35, 183 yards, TD, INT
New Haven	Rushing	AJ Duffy	5 carries, 37 yards, TD
New Haven	Receiving	Kevonne Wilder	4 receptions, 74 yards
Mercyhurst	Passing	Adam Urena	21/27, 349 yards, 2 TD
Mercyhurst	Rushing	Brian Trobel	10 carries, 115 yards, 3 TD
Mercyhurst	Receiving	Dylan Evans	7 receptions, 157 yards

=== at No. 21 Sacramento State ===
Mercyhurst Lakers (1–1) at No. 21 Sacramento State Hornets (0–2) – Game summary

Quarter	1	2	3	4	Total
Lakers	10	8	7	3	28
No. 21 Hornets	7	14	7	21	49

at Hornet Stadium • Sacramento, CA

- Date: September 13
- Game time: 9:00 p.m. EDT
- Game attendance: 12,231
- Referee: Jim Crowley
- TV announcers (ESPN+): Jason Ross (play-by-play) and Darren Arbet (analyst)

Game information

First quarter

- SAC – Jordan Williams 19-yard pass from Cardell Williams (Grant Meadors kick), 13:23. Hornets 7–0. Drive: 4 plays, 74 yards, 1:33.
- MERC – Max Young 34-yard field goal, 8:46. Hornets 7–3. Drive: 12 plays, 58 yards, 4:37.
- MERC – Dylan Evans 24-yard pass from Adam Urena (Max Young kick), 3:29. Lakers 10–7. Drive: 6 plays, 39 yards, 2:38.

Second quarter

- MERC – Brian Trobel 1-yard run (Brian Trobel run), 6:02. Lakers 18–7. Drive: 15 plays, 85 yards, 7:36.
- SAC – Damian Henderson II 19-yard run (Grant Meadors kick), 2:36. Lakers 18–14. Drive: 9 plays, 78 yards, 3:18.
- SAC – Ernest Campbell 57-yard pass from Cardell Williams (Grant Meadors kick), 0:23. Hornets 21–18. Drive: 1 play, 57 yards, 0:09.

Third quarter

- SAC – Sam Adams II 15-yard run (Grant Meadors kick), 10:58. Hornets 28–18. Drive: 9 plays, 80 yards, 2:57.
- MERC – Rylan Davison 16-yard pass from Adam Urena (Max Young kick), 3:52. Hornets 28–25. Drive: 12 plays, 84 yards, 7:03.

Fourth quarter

- SAC – Damian Henderson II 4-yard run (Grant Meadors kick), 14:19. Hornets 35–25. Drive: 10 plays, 53 yards, 4:25.
- MERC – Max Young 24-yard field goal, 7:59. Hornets 35–28. Drive: 14 plays, 68 yards, 6:20.
- SAC – Damian Henderson II 30-yard run (Grant Meadors kick), 2:48. Hornets 42–28. Drive: 9 plays, 80 yards, 5:08.
- SAC – Cardell Williams 24-yard run (Grant Meadors kick), 1:32. Hornets 49–28. Drive: 3 plays, 43 yards, 0:23.

Statistics	MERC	SAC
First downs	22	26
Plays–yards	79–369	60–525
Rushes–yards	34–89	42–349
Passing yards	280	176
Passing: Comp–Att–Int	27–45–2	8–18–0
Turnovers	2	1
Time of possession	35:27	24:33

Team	Category	Player	Statistics
Mercyhurst	Passing	Adam Urena	27/44, 280 yards, 2 TD, 2 INT
Mercyhurst	Rushing	Brian Trobel	10 carries, 62 yards, TD
Mercyhurst	Receiving	Joe Kerbacher	4 receptions, 61 yards
Sacramento State	Passing	Cardell Williams	8/17, 176 yards, 2 TD
Sacramento State	Rushing	Damian Henderson II	12 carries, 98 yards, 3 TD
Sacramento State	Receiving	Ernest Campbell	2 receptions, 78 yards, TD

=== at No. 4 Montana State ===
Mercyhurst Lakers (1-2) at No. 4 Montana State Bobcats (1-2) – Game summary

Quarter	1	2	3	4	Total
Lakers	0	0	0	0	0
No. 4 Bobcats	7	10	0	0	17

at Bobcat Stadium • Bozeman, MT

- Date: September 20
- Game time: 3:00 p.m. EDT
- Game weather: Sunny, 73 °F (23 °C)
- Game attendance: 21,317
- Referee: Spencer Mumford
- TV: ESPN+

Game information

First quarter

- MTST – Julius Davis 3-yard run (Myles Sansted kick), 9:06. Bobcats 7–0. Drive: 10 plays, 92 yards, 5:49.

Second quarter

- MTST – Myles Sansted 22-yard field goal, 12:06. Bobcats 10–0. Drive: 18 plays, 76 yards, 7:51.
- MTST – Adam Jones 5-yard run (Myles Sansted kick), 0:40. Bobcats 17–0. Drive: 11 plays, 83 yards, 4:35.

Third quarter

- No scoring plays.

Fourth quarter

- No scoring plays.

Statistics	MERC	MTST
First downs	15	20
Plays–yards	59–263	58–354
Rushes–yards	23–58	41–233
Passing yards	205	121
Passing: Comp–Att–Int	24–36–1	12–17–1
Turnovers	2	1
Time of possession	31:26	28:34

Team	Category	Player	Statistics
Mercyhurst	Passing	Adam Urena	23/35, 206 yards, INT
Mercyhurst	Rushing	Brian Trobel	13 carries, 48 yards
Mercyhurst	Receiving	Rylan Davison	7 receptions, 84 yards
Montana State	Passing	Justin Lamson	12/17, 121 yards, INT
Montana State	Rushing	Colson Coon	5 carries, 71 yards
Montana State	Receiving	Adam Jones	3 receptions, 31 yards

=== at No. 2 South Dakota State ===
Mercyhurst Lakers (1-3) vs. No. 2 South Dakota State Jackrabbits (3-0) – Game summary

Quarter	1	2	3	4	Total
Lakers	0	7	0	0	7
No. 2 Jackrabbits	17	6	14	14	51

at Dana J. Dykhouse Stadium • Brookings, SD

- Date: September 27
- Game time: 3:00 p.m. EDT
- Game weather: Sunny • Temperature: 72 °F (22 °C) • Wind: S at 7 miles per hour (11 km/h)
- Game attendance: 19,034
- Referee: Gregory Gompf
- TV: ESPN+

Game information

First Quarter

- (10:03) SDST – Eli Stader 36-yard field goal (Drive: 11 plays, 43 yards, 4:51; South Dakota State 3-0)
- (4:20) SDST – Alex Bullock 28-yard pass from Chase Mason, Eli Stader kick (Drive: 7 plays, 55 yards, 3:35; South Dakota State 10-0)
- (3:56) SDST – Lofton O'Groske 19-yard pass from Chase Mason, Eli Stader kick (Drive: 1 play, 19 yards, 0:06; South Dakota State 17-0)

Second Quarter

- (13:38) MERC – Evan Van Dyke 22-yard pass from Adam Urena, Max Young kick (Drive: 11 plays, 75 yards, 5:18; South Dakota State 17-7)
- (5:12) SDST – Eli Stader 25-yard field goal (Drive: 14 plays, 76 yards, 8:20; South Dakota State 20-7)
- (0:00) SDST – Eli Stader 28-yard field goal (Drive: 7 plays, 26 yards, 1:50; South Dakota State 23-7)

Third Quarter

- (9:59) SDST – Jack Smith 18-yard pass from Chase Mason, Eli Stader kick (Drive: 5 plays, 42 yards, 2:39; South Dakota State 30-7)
- (4:23) SDST – James Basinger 1-yard run, Eli Stader kick (Drive: 4 plays, 70 yards, 1:07; South Dakota State 37-7)

Fourth Quarter

- (12:48) SDST – Brenden Begeman 5-yard run, Eli Stader kick (Drive: 9 plays, 61 yards, 4:48; South Dakota State 44-7)
- (1:55) SDST – James Basinger 1-yard run, Eli Stader kick (Drive: 14 plays, 67 yards, 9:19; South Dakota State 51-7)

Statistics	MERC	SDST
First downs	9	26
Total yards	154	469
Rushing yards	41	126
Passing yards	113	343
Passing: Comp–Att–Int	13–20–2	24–32–0
Time of possession	23:13	36:47

Team	Category	Player	Statistics
Mercyhurst	Passing	Adam Urena	12/18, 103 yards, TD, 2 INT
Mercyhurst	Rushing	Brian Trobel	9 carries, 22 yards
Mercyhurst	Receiving	Evan Van Dyke	5 receptions, 62 yards, TD
South Dakota State	Passing	Chase Mason	21/29, 321 yards, 3 TD
South Dakota State	Rushing	James Basinger	15 carries, 53 yards, 2 TD
South Dakota State	Receiving	Grahm Goering	7 receptions, 101 yards

=== LIU ===
LIU Sharks (1-4) vs. Mercyhurst Lakers (1-4) – Game summary

Quarter	1	2	3	4	Total
Sharks	0	3	10	0	13
Lakers	6	9	0	7	22

at Saxon Stadium • Erie, PA

- Date: October 4
- Game time: 1:00 p.m. EDT
- TV announcers (ESPN+): Craig D'Amico (play-by-play) and Wayne Bradford (analyst)

Statistics	LIU	MERC
First downs	12	22
Total yards	252	318
Rushing yards	85	127
Passing yards	167	191
Passing: Comp–Att–Int	15–28–2	24–31–1
Time of possession	23:00	37:00

Team	Category	Player	Statistics
LIU	Passing		
LIU	Rushing		
LIU	Receiving		
Mercyhurst	Passing	Adam Urena	24/31, 191 yards, TD, INT
Mercyhurst	Rushing		
Mercyhurst	Receiving		

=== at Wagner ===
Mercyhurst Lakers (2-4) vs. Wagner Seahawks (1-4) – Game summary

Quarter	1	2	3	4	Total
Lakers	0	12	7	0	19
Seahawks	0	7	0	0	7

at Wagner College Stadium • New York City, NY

- Date: October 11
- Game time: 12:00 p.m. EDT
- TV: NEC Front Row

Statistics	MERC	WAG
First downs	19	17
Total yards	350	304
Rushing yards	159	121
Passing yards	191	183
Passing: Comp–Att–Int	13–24–0	12–23–0
Time of possession	33:28	26:32

Team	Category	Player	Statistics
Mercyhurst	Passing	Alex Gevaudan	13/24, 191 yards, TD
Mercyhurst	Rushing		
Mercyhurst	Receiving		
Wagner	Passing	Jordan Barton	10/16, 123 yards, TD
Wagner	Rushing		
Wagner	Receiving		

=== Duquesne ===
Duquesne Dukes (4-3) vs. Mercyhurst Lakers (3-4) – Game summary

Quarter	1	2	3	4	Total
Dukes	14	13	0	10	37
Lakers	0	0	0	0	0

at Saxon Stadium • Erie, PA

- Date: October 18
- Game time: 6:00 p.m. EDT
- TV announcers (NEC Front Row): Shawn Bednard (play-by-play) and John Leisering (analyst)

Statistics	DUQ	MERC
First downs		
Total yards		
Rushing yards		
Passing yards		
Passing: Comp–Att–Int		
Time of possession		

Team	Category	Player	Statistics
Duquesne	Passing		
Duquesne	Rushing		
Duquesne	Receiving		
Mercyhurst	Passing		
Mercyhurst	Rushing		
Mercyhurst	Receiving		

=== Stonehill ===
Stonehill Skyhawks (2-5) vs. Mercyhurst Lakers (3-5) – Game summary

Quarter	1	2	3	4	Total
Skyhawks	13	6	0	3	22
Lakers	0	7	0	8	15

at Saxon Stadium • Erie, PA

- Date: October 25

Statistics	STO	MERC
First downs		
Total yards		
Rushing yards		
Passing yards		
Passing: Comp–Att–Int		
Time of possession		

Team	Category	Player	Statistics
Stonehill	Passing		
Stonehill	Rushing		
Stonehill	Receiving		
Mercyhurst	Passing		
Mercyhurst	Rushing		
Mercyhurst	Receiving		

=== at Saint Francis (PA) ===
Mercyhurst Lakers (3-6) vs. Saint Francis Red Flash (0-8) – Game summary

Quarter	1	2	3	4	Total
Lakers	-	-	-	-	0
Red Flash	-	-	-	-	0

at DeGol Field • Loretto, PA

- Date: November 8

Statistics	MERC	SFPA
First downs		
Total yards		
Rushing yards		
Passing yards		
Passing: Comp–Att–Int		
Time of possession		

Team	Category	Player	Statistics
Mercyhurst	Passing		
Mercyhurst	Rushing		
Mercyhurst	Receiving		
Saint Francis (PA)	Passing		
Saint Francis (PA)	Rushing		
Saint Francis (PA)	Receiving		

=== Robert Morris ===
Robert Morris Colonials (0-0) vs. Mercyhurst Lakers (0-0) – Game summary

Quarter	1	2	3	4	Total
Colonials	-	-	-	-	0
Lakers	-	-	-	-	0

at Saxon Stadium • Erie, PA

- Date: November 15

Statistics	RMU	MERC
First downs		
Total yards		
Rushing yards		
Passing yards		
Passing: Comp–Att–Int		
Time of possession		

Team	Category	Player	Statistics
Robert Morris	Passing		
Robert Morris	Rushing		
Robert Morris	Receiving		
Mercyhurst	Passing		
Mercyhurst	Rushing		
Mercyhurst	Receiving		

=== at Central Connecticut ===
Mercyhurst Lakers (5-6) vs. Central Connecticut Blue Devils (7-4) – Game summary

Quarter	1	2	3	4	Total
Lakers	14	7	7	0	28
Blue Devils	14	7	7	7	35

at Arute Field • New Britain, CT

- Date: November 22
- Game time: 12:00 p.m. EDT
- Game weather: Sunny • Temperature: 45 °F (7 °C) • Wind: NW at 7 miles per hour (11 km/h)
- Game attendance: 2,015
- Referee: Jonathan Grande
- TV: NEC Front Row

Game information

First Quarter

- (13:05) CCSU - Elijah Howard 22 yd run, Jack Hennessey kick, (1 plays, 22 yards, TOP 00:08; 7-0 Central Connecticut)
- (10:05) MER - Dylan Evans 5 yd run, Max Young kick, (1 plays, 5 yards, TOP 00:05; 7-7 Tied)
- (04:14) MER - Brian Trobel 2 yd run, Max Young kick, (7 plays, 66 yards, TOP 04:44; 14-7 Mercyhurst)
- (00:51) CCSU - Elijah Howard 4 yd run, Jack Hennessey kick, (8 plays, 72 yards, TOP 03:16; 14-14 Tied)

Second Quarter

- (07:30) MER - Brian Trobel 63 yd run, Max Young kick, (3 plays, 81 yards, TOP 00:50; 21-14 Mercyhurst)
- (01:54) CCSU - Michael Trovarelli 15 yd pass from Brady Olson, Jack Hennessey kick, (14 plays, 78 yards, TOP 05:31; 21-21 Tied)

Third Quarter

- (11:17) CCSU - Donny Marcus 17 yd pass from Brady Olson, Jack Hennessey kick, (8 plays, 75 yards, TOP 03:43; 28-21 Central Connecticut)
- (02:03) MER - Taylor Wright-Rawls 11 yd pass from Adam Urena, Max Young kick, (8 plays, 69 yards, TOP 04:37; 28-28 Tied)

Fourth Quarter

- (11:14) CCSU - Elijah Howard 8 yd pass from Brady Olson, Jack Hennessey kick, (6 plays, 12 yards, TOP 02:46; 35-28 Central Connecticut)

Statistics	MERC	CCSU
First downs	24	25
Total yards	457	421
Rushing yards	269	200
Passing yards	188	221
Passing: Comp–Att–Int	17–36–0	22–35–1
Time of possession	29:45	30:15

Team	Category	Player	Statistics
Mercyhurst	Passing	Adam Urena	17/36, 188 yards, TD
Mercyhurst	Rushing	Brian Trobel	21 carries, 166 yards, 2 TD
Mercyhurst	Receiving	Rylan Davison	5 receptions, 94 yards
Central Connecticut	Passing	Brady Olson	22/35, 221 yards, 3 TD, INT
Central Connecticut	Rushing	Elijah Howard	25 carries, 176 yards, 2 TD
Central Connecticut	Receiving	Michael Trovarelli	6 receptions, 73 yards, TD
