= 2025 Stonehill Skyhawks football team =

American college football season

2025 Stonehill Skyhawks football

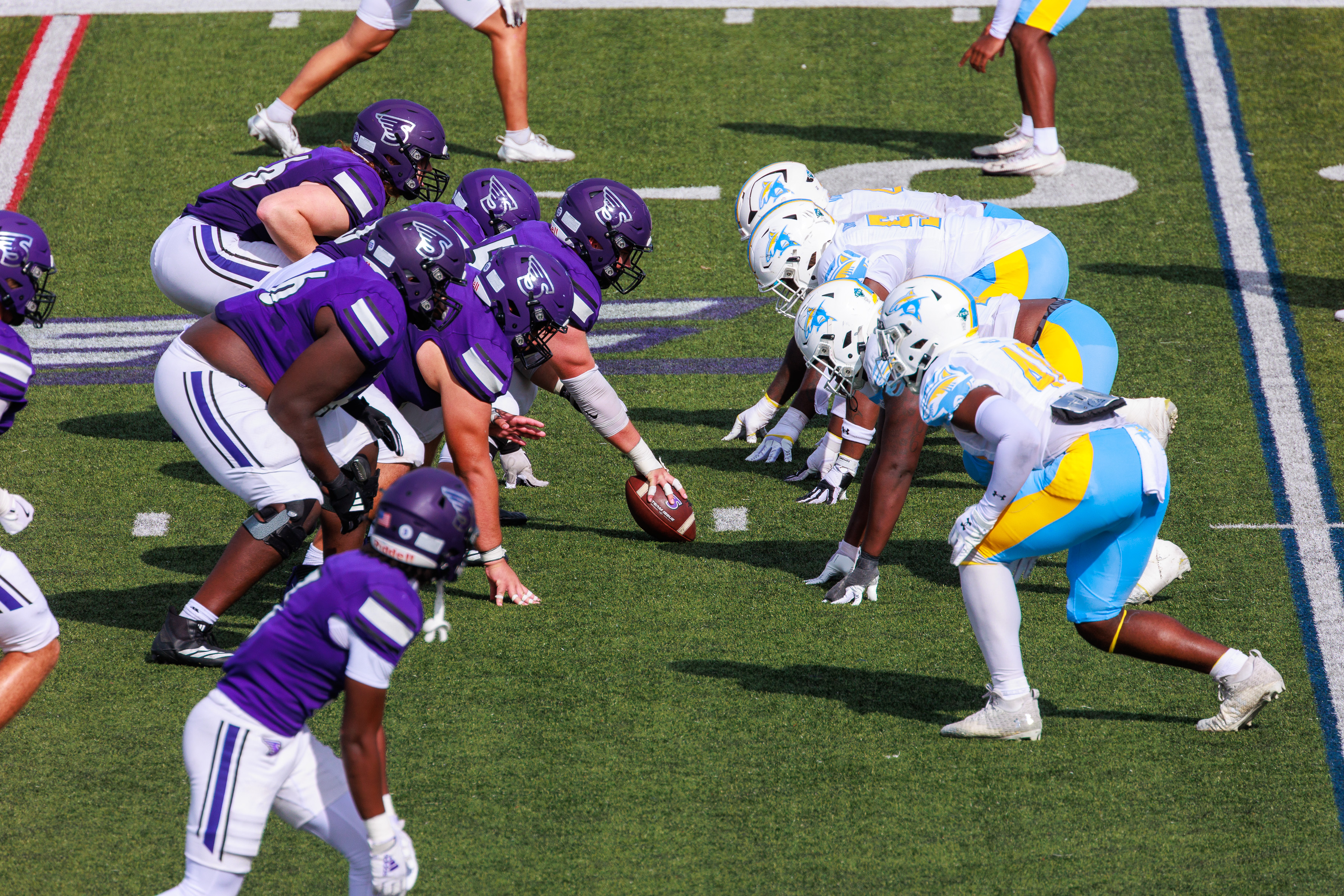
- Skyhawks beat the LIU Sharks, 10-3
- Conference: Northeast Conference
- Record: 4–8 (3–4 NEC)
- Head coach: Eli Gardner (9th season)
- Offensive coordinator: Dan Herbert (1st season)
- Defensive coordinator: Kyle Jones (5th season)
- Home stadium: W.B. Mason Stadium

2025 Northeast Conference football standings
	Conf.			Overall
Team	W		L	W		L
Central Connecticut $^	6	–	1	8	–	5
Duquesne	5	–	2	7	–	5
Mercyhurst*	4	–	3	5	–	7
LIU	4	–	3	6	–	6
Wagner	4	–	3	5	–	7
Stonehill	3	–	4	4	–	8
Robert Morris	2	–	5	3	–	9
New Haven*	0	–	0	5	–	5
Saint Francis	0	–	7	0	–	11
$ – Conference champion; ^ – FCS playoff participant; * – Ineligible for NEC title and FCS postseason play due to transition from NCAA Division II.; Rankings from STATS Poll

The 2025 Stonehill Skyhawks football team represented Stonehill College as a member of the Northeast Conference (NEC) during the 2025 NCAA Division I FCS football season. The Skyhawks were led by ninth-year head coach Eli Gardner and played their home games at W.B. Mason Stadium. The 2025 season represented the first time Stonehill was eligible for the NEC title and FCS postseason play since to completing their transition from NCAA Division II.

== Preseason ==
=== Preseason coaches' poll ===
The NEC released their preseason coaches' poll on August 4, 2025. The Skyhawks were picked to finish in last place.

== Schedule ==
Date	Time	Opponent	Site	TV	Result	Attendance
August 30	2:00 p.m.	at Sacred Heart*	Campus Field; Fairfield, CT	ESPN+	L 7–12	4,197
September 6	1:00 p.m.	Lafayette*	W.B. Mason Stadium; Easton, MA	NEC Front Row	L 26–42	2,351
September 13	6:00 p.m.	at Maine*	Alfond Sports Stadium; Orono, ME	FloFootball	W 13–10	3,966
September 20	1:00 p.m.	Penn*	W.B. Mason Stadium; Easton, MA	NEC Front Row	L 21–24	3,800
September 27	1:00 p.m.	LIU^{†}	W.B. Mason Stadium; Easton, MA	NEC Front Row	W 10–3	1,800
October 4	1:00 p.m.	at Duquesne	Rooney Field; Pittsburgh, PA	NEC Front Row	L 14–34	1,068
October 18	12:00 p.m.	at Yale*	Yale Bowl; New Haven, CT	ESPN+	L 7–47	4,166
October 25	12:00 p.m.	at Mercyhurst	Saxon Stadium; Erie, PA	NEC Front Row	W 22–15	1,257
November 1	1:00 p.m.	Robert Morris	W.B. Mason Stadium; Easton, MA	NEC Front Row	L 17–20	900
November 8	1:00 p.m.	at Central Connecticut	Arute Field; New Britain, CT	ESPN+/NESN+	L 10–40	
November 15	1:00 p.m.	at Wagner	Wagner College Stadium; Staten Island, NY	NEC Front Row	L 14–20	857
November 22	1:00 p.m.	Saint Francis	W.B. Mason Stadium; Easton, MA	NEC Front Row	W 20–10	1,287
*Non-conference game; ^{†}Homecoming; All times are in Eastern time

== Game summaries ==
=== at Sacred Heart ===
Stonehill Skyhawks (0-0) vs. Sacred Heart Pioneers (0-0) – Game summary

Quarter	1	2	3	4	Total
Skyhawks	0	0	0	7	7
Pioneers	0	0	9	3	12

at Campus Field • Fairfield, CT

- Date: August 30
- Game time: 2:00 PM EDT
- TV announcers (ESPN+): Freddie Coleman (play-by-play), Chris Smith (analyst) and Morgan Bedard (sideline)

Statistics	STO	SHU
First downs	16	18
Total yards	261	288
Rushing yards	49	161
Passing yards	212	119
Passing: Comp–Att–Int	30–39–0	11–21–0
Time of possession	27:38	32:22

Team	Category	Player	Statistics
Stonehill	Passing		
Stonehill	Rushing		
Stonehill	Receiving		
Sacred Heart	Passing		
Sacred Heart	Rushing		
Sacred Heart	Receiving		

=== Lafayette ===
Lafayette Leopards (0-1) vs. Stonehill Skyhawks (0-1) – Game summary

Quarter	1	2	3	4	Total
Leopards	-	-	-	-	0
Skyhawks	-	-	-	-	0

at W.B. Mason Stadium • Easton, MA

- Date: September 6
- Game time: 1:00 PM EDT
- TV announcers (NEC Front Row): Charlie Bergeron (play-by-play) and Peter Cyzmbor (analyst)

Statistics	LAF	STO
First downs		
Total yards		
Rushing yards		
Passing yards		
Passing: Comp–Att–Int		
Time of possession		

Team	Category	Player	Statistics
Lafayette	Passing		
Lafayette	Rushing		
Lafayette	Receiving		
Stonehill	Passing		
Stonehill	Rushing		
Stonehill	Receiving		

=== at Maine ===
Stonehill Skyhawks (0-2) vs. Maine Black Bears (0-2) – Game summary

Quarter	1	2	3	4	Total
Skyhawks	-	-	-	-	0
Black Bears	-	-	-	-	0

at Alfond Sports Stadium • Orono, ME

- Date: September 13
- Game time: 6:00 PM EDT
- TV announcers (FloFootball): Jim Churchill (play-by-play), Jack Webb (analyst) and Allison Ouellette (sideline)

Statistics	STO	ME
First downs		
Total yards		
Rushing yards		
Passing yards		
Passing: Comp–Att–Int		
Time of possession		

Team	Category	Player	Statistics
Stonehill	Passing		
Stonehill	Rushing		
Stonehill	Receiving		
Maine	Passing		
Maine	Rushing		
Maine	Receiving		

=== Penn ===
Penn Quakers (0-0) vs. Stonehill Skyhawks (1-2) – Game summary

Quarter	1	2	3	4	Total
Quakers	14	7	0	3	24
Skyhawks	7	0	0	14	21

at W.B. Mason Stadium • Easton, MA

- Date: September 20
- Game time: 1:00 PM EDT
- Game weather: Sunny • Temperature: 66 °F (19 °C)
- Game attendance: 3,800
- Referee: Jonathan Grande
- TV announcers (NEC Front Row): Charlie Bergeron (play-by-play) and Peter Czymbor (analyst)

Game information

First Quarter

- PENN – Jared Richardson 69-yard pass from Liam O'Brien (Sam Smith kick), 14:10. Quakers 7–0. Drive: 3 plays, 74 yards, 0:43.
- PENN – Julien Stokes 63-yard punt return (Sam Smith kick), 7:13. Quakers 14–0.
- STO – Myles Wilson 11-yard pass from Jack O'Connell (Domenic Scalese kick), 1:28. Quakers 14–7. Drive: 10 plays, 75 yards, 5:45.

Second Quarter

- PENN – Sean Williams Jr. 1-yard run (Sam Smith kick), 12:05. Quakers 21–7. Drive: 10 plays, 49 yards, 4:13.

Third Quarter

No scoring plays

Fourth Quarter

- STO – Zavion Woodard 5-yard run (Demonic Scalese kick), 14:54. Quakers 21–14. Drive: 6 plays, 38 yards, 3:11.
- STO – Torance Washington Jr. 28-yard pass from Jack O'Connell (Domenic Scalese kick), 5:32. Tied 21–21. Drive: 13 plays, 99 yards, 6:45.
- PENN – Sam Smith 45-yard field goal, 0:09. Quakers 24–21. Drive: 7 plays, 35 yards, 1:37.

Statistics	PENN	STO
First downs	17	17
Total yards	375	261
Rushing yards	137	96
Passing yards	238	165
Passing: Comp–Att–Int	16–31–1	18–26–0
Time of possession	27:57	32:03

Team	Category	Player	Statistics
Penn	Passing	Liam O'Brien	16/31, 238 yards, TD, INT
Penn	Rushing	Julien Stokes	11 carries, 52 yards
Penn	Receiving	Jared Richardson	5 receptions, 103 yards, TD
Stonehill	Passing	Jack O'Connell	18/26, 165 yards, 2 TD
Stonehill	Rushing	Zavion Woodard	11 carries, 34 yards, TD
Stonehill	Receiving	Torance Washington Jr.	5 receptions, 59 yards, TD

=== LIU ===
LIU Sharks (1-3) vs. Stonehill Skyhawks (1-3) – Game summary

Quarter	1	2	3	4	Total
Sharks	0	0	3	0	3
Skyhawks	0	3	0	7	10

at W.B. Mason Stadium • Easton, MA

- Date: September 27
- Game time: 1:00 PM EDT
- TV: NEC Front Row

Statistics	LIU	STO
First downs		
Total yards		
Rushing yards		
Passing yards		
Passing: Comp–Att–Int		
Time of possession		

Team	Category	Player	Statistics
LIU	Passing		
LIU	Rushing		
LIU	Receiving		
Stonehill	Passing		
Stonehill	Rushing		
Stonehill	Receiving		

=== at Duquesne ===
Stonehill Skyhawks (2-3) vs. Duquesne Dukes (2-3) – Game summary

Quarter	1	2	3	4	Total
Skyhawks	0	0	0	14	14
Dukes	0	20	7	7	34

at Rooney Field • Pittsburgh, PA

- Date: October 4
- Game time: 1:00 PM EDT
- TV announcers (NEC Front Row): Tim Benz (play-by-play) and Ellis Cannon (analyst)

Statistics	STO	DUQ
First downs		
Total yards		
Rushing yards		
Passing yards		
Passing: Comp–Att–Int		
Time of possession		

Team	Category	Player	Statistics
Stonehill	Passing		
Stonehill	Rushing		
Stonehill	Receiving		
Duquesne	Passing		
Duquesne	Rushing		
Duquesne	Receiving		

=== at Yale ===
Stonehill Skyhawks (2-4) vs. Yale Bulldogs (2-2) – Game summary

Quarter	1	2	3	4	Total
Skyhawks	-	-	-	-	0
Bulldogs	-	-	-	-	0

at Yale Bowl • New Haven, CT

- Date: October 18
- Game time: 12:00 p.m. EDT
- TV announcers (ESPN+): Jim Cain (play-by-play) and Jack Siedlecki (analyst)

Statistics	STO	YALE
First downs		
Total yards		
Rushing yards		
Passing yards		
Passing: Comp–Att–Int		
Time of possession		

Team	Category	Player	Statistics
Stonehill	Passing		
Stonehill	Rushing		
Stonehill	Receiving		
Yale	Passing		
Yale	Rushing		
Yale	Receiving		

=== at Mercyhurst ===
Stonehill Skyhawks (2-5) vs. Mercyhurst Lakers (3-5) – Game summary

Quarter	1	2	3	4	Total
Skyhawks	-	-	-	-	0
Lakers	-	-	-	-	0

at Saxon Stadium • Erie, PA

- Date: October 25

Statistics	STO	MERC
First downs		
Total yards		
Rushing yards		
Passing yards		
Passing: Comp–Att–Int		
Time of possession		

Team	Category	Player	Statistics
Stonehill	Passing		
Stonehill	Rushing		
Stonehill	Receiving		
Mercyhurst	Passing		
Mercyhurst	Rushing		
Mercyhurst	Receiving		

=== Robert Morris ===
Robert Morris Colonials (2-6) vs. Stonehill Skyhawks (3-5) – Game summary

Quarter	1	2	3	4	Total
Colonials	-	-	-	-	0
Skyhawks	-	-	-	-	0

at W.B. Mason Stadium • Easton, MA

- Date: November 1
- Game time: 1:00 PM EDT

Statistics	RMU	STO
First downs		
Total yards		
Rushing yards		
Passing yards		
Passing: Comp–Att–Int		
Time of possession		

Team	Category	Player	Statistics
Robert Morris	Passing		
Robert Morris	Rushing		
Robert Morris	Receiving		
Stonehill	Passing		
Stonehill	Rushing		
Stonehill	Receiving		

=== at Central Connecticut ===
Stonehill Skyhawks (3-6) vs. Central Connecticut Blue Devils (6-3) – Game summary

Quarter	1	2	3	4	Total
Skyhawks	-	-	-	-	0
Blue Devils	-	-	-	-	0

at Arute Field • New Britain, CT

- Date: November 8
- Game time: 12:00 p.m. EDT
- TV: ESPN+/YES

Statistics	STO	CCSU
First downs		
Total yards		
Rushing yards		
Passing yards		
Passing: Comp–Att–Int		
Time of possession		

Team	Category	Player	Statistics
Stonehill	Passing		
Stonehill	Rushing		
Stonehill	Receiving		
Central Connecticut	Passing		
Central Connecticut	Rushing		
Central Connecticut	Receiving		

=== at Wagner ===
Stonehill Skyhawks (0-0) vs. Wagner Seahawks (0-0) – Game summary

Quarter	1	2	3	4	Total
Skyhawks	-	-	-	-	0
Seahawks	-	-	-	-	0

at Wagner College Stadium • New York City, NY

- Date: November 15

Statistics	STO	WAG
First downs		
Total yards		
Rushing yards		
Passing yards		
Passing: Comp–Att–Int		
Time of possession		

Team	Category	Player	Statistics
Stonehill	Passing		
Stonehill	Rushing		
Stonehill	Receiving		
Wagner	Passing		
Wagner	Rushing		
Wagner	Receiving		

=== Saint Francis ===
Saint Francis Red Flash (0-0) vs. Stonehill Skyhawks (0-0) – Game summary

Quarter	1	2	3	4	Total
Red Flash	-	-	-	-	0
Skyhawks	-	-	-	-	0

at W.B. Mason Stadium • Easton, MA

- Date: November 22
- Game time: 1:00 PM EST

Statistics	SFU	STO
First downs		
Total yards		
Rushing yards		
Passing yards		
Passing: Comp–Att–Int		
Time of possession		

Team	Category	Player	Statistics
Saint Francis	Passing		
Saint Francis	Rushing		
Saint Francis	Receiving		
Stonehill	Passing		
Stonehill	Rushing		
Stonehill	Receiving		
