= 2025 New Haven Chargers football team =

American college football season

2025 New Haven Chargers football
- Conference: Northeast Conference
- Record: 5–5 (0–0 NEC)
- Head coach: Mark Powell (1st season)
- Home stadium: Ralph F. DellaCamera Stadium

2025 Northeast Conference football standings
	Conf.			Overall
Team	W		L	W		L
Central Connecticut $^	6	–	1	8	–	5
Duquesne	5	–	2	7	–	5
Mercyhurst*	4	–	3	5	–	7
LIU	4	–	3	6	–	6
Wagner	4	–	3	5	–	7
Stonehill	3	–	4	4	–	8
Robert Morris	2	–	5	3	–	9
New Haven*	0	–	0	5	–	5
Saint Francis	0	–	7	0	–	11
$ – Conference champion; ^ – FCS playoff participant; * – Ineligible for NEC title and FCS postseason play due to transition from NCAA Division II.; Rankings from STATS Poll

The 2025 New Haven Chargers football team represented the University of New Haven as a first-year member of the Northeast Conference (NEC) during the 2025 NCAA Division I FCS football season. The Chargers were led by first-year head coach Mark Powell and played home games at Ralph F. DellaCamera Stadium in West Haven, Connecticut. This season was the first of New Haven's four-year transition from NCAA Division II, and therefore they were ineligible for Northeast Conference championships and the FCS playoffs.

== Schedule ==
Date	Time	Opponent	Site	TV	Result	Attendance
August 29	7:00 p.m.	at Marist*	Leonidoff Field; Poughkeepsie, NY	ESPN+	L 14–31	4,955
September 6	12:00 p.m.	at Mercyhurst*	Saxon Stadium; Erie, PA	NEC Front Row	L 14–48	777
September 13	7:00 p.m.	at Albany*	Tom & Mary Casey Stadium; Albany, NY	FloFootball	W 24–17	6,629
September 20	1:00 p.m.	Saginaw Valley State*	Ralph F. DellaCamera Stadium; West Haven, CT	NEC Front Row	W 35–28	5,467
September 27	12:00 p.m.	at Duquesne*	Rooney Field; Pittsburgh, PA	NEC Front Row	L 18–44	1,078
October 4	1:00 p.m.	Pace*	Ralph F. DellaCamera Stadium; West Haven, CT	NEC Front Row	W 28–14	6,384
October 11	1:00 p.m.	Western Connecticut*	Ralph F. DellaCamera Stadium; West Haven, CT	NEC Front Row	W 69–0	6,119
October 25	12:00 p.m.	at LIU*	Bethpage Federal Credit Union Stadium; Brookville, NY	NEC Front Row	L 16–38	1,113
November 1	12:00 p.m.	at Sacred Heart*	Campus Field; Fairfield, CT	ESPN+	L 20–35	2,960
November 8	3:30 p.m.	Merrimack*	Ralph F. DellaCamera Stadium; West Haven, CT	NEC Front Row	W 41–31	5,821
*Non-conference game; All times are in Eastern time; Source:

== Game summaries ==
=== at Marist ===
New Haven Chargers (0-0) at Marist Red Foxes (0-0) – Game summary

Quarter	1	2	3	4	Total
Chargers	0	7	0	7	14
Red Foxes	17	0	7	7	31

at Leonidoff Field • Poughkeepsie, NY

- Date: August 29
- Game time: 7:00 p.m. EDT
- Game weather: Cloudy • Temperature: 69 °F (21 °C) • Wind: N at 4 miles per hour (6.4 km/h)
- Game attendance: 4,955
- Referee: Eric Lewis
- TV announcers (ESPN+): Geoff Brault (play-by-play), Steve Eggink (analyst), William Rosen (sideline)

Game information

First quarter

- MRST – Samer Layous 35-yard field goal, 10:49. Red Foxes 3–0. Drive: 10 plays, 59 yards, 4:07.
- MRST – Tristan Shannon 59-yard run (Samer Layous kick), 7:11. Red Foxes 10–0. Drive: 4 plays, 68 yards, 2:35.
- MRST – Connor Hulstein 17-yard pass from Sonny Mannino (Samer Layous kick), 0:18. Red Foxes 17–0. Drive: 9 plays, 50 yards, 3:56.

Second quarter

- NH – Evan Chieca 5-yard pass from AJ Duffy (Liam Quigley kick), 11:27. Red Foxes 17–7. Drive: 9 plays, 72 yards, 3:44.

Third quarter

- MRST – Sonny Mannino 4-yard run (Samer Layous kick), 2:42. Red Foxes 24–7. Drive: 2 plays, 13 yards, 0:42.

Fourth quarter

- NH – Logan Schmidt 21-yard pass from AJ Duffy (Liam Quigley kick), 11:13. Red Foxes 24–14. Drive: 4 plays, 41 yards, 1:19.
- MRST – Rene Barber 0-yard fumble return (Samer Layous kick), 0:44. Red Foxes 31–14.

Statistics	NH	MRST
First downs	22	17
Total yards	396	305
Rushes–yards	19–18	44–228
Passing yards	377	75
Passing: Comp–Att–Int	31–55–1	11–20–0
Turnovers	4	1
Time of possession	26:53	33:07

Team	Category	Player	Statistics
New Haven	Passing	AJ Duffy	31/55, 377 yards, 2 TD, INT
New Haven	Rushing	Brian Thomas	8 carries, 16 yards
New Haven	Receiving	Joshua Tracey	9 receptions, 145 yards
Marist	Passing	Sonny Mannino	11/20, 75 yards, TD
Marist	Rushing	Sonny Mannino	21 carries, 109 yards, TD
Marist	Receiving	Connor Hulstein	2 receptions, 27 yards, TD

=== at Mercyhurst ===
New Haven Chargers (0-1) at Mercyhurst Lakers (0-1) – Game summary

Quarter	1	2	3	4	Total
Chargers	7	0	0	7	14
Lakers	13	14	14	7	48

at Saxon Stadium • Erie, PA

- Date: September 6
- Game time: 12:00 p.m. EDT
- Game weather: Sunny • Temperature: 63 °F (17 °C)
- Game attendance: 777
- Referee: Travis Barta
- TV: NEC Front Row

Game information

First Quarter

- (11:32) MERC – Rylan Davison 0-yard pass from Adam Urena, Max Young kick (Drive: 7 plays, 83 yards, 3:22; Mercyhurst 7–0)
- (8:05) NH – Joshua Tracey 16-yard pass from AJ Duffy, Liam Quigley kick (Drive: 8 plays, 76 yards, 3:22; Tied 7–7)
- (5:16) MERC – Brian Trobel 6-yard run (Drive: 5 plays, 75 yards, 2:49; Mercyhurst 13–7)

Second Quarter

- (13:35) MERC – Dylan Evans 8-yard run, Max Young kick (Drive: 9 plays, 86 yards, 4:53; Mercyhurst 20–7)
- (1:13) MERC – Ayron Rodriguez 17-yard run, Max Young kick (Drive: 8 plays, 59 yards, 4:07; Mercyhurst 27–7)

Third Quarter

- (7:32) MERC – Brian Trobel 2-yard run, Max Young kick (Drive: 9 plays, 80 yards, 4:26; Mercyhurst 34–7)
- (4:20) MERC – Brian Trobel 31-yard run, Max Young kick (Drive: 4 plays, 54 yards, 1:20; Mercyhurst 41–7)

Fourth Quarter

- (12:20) MERC – Ashton Wilson 1-yard pass from Adam Urena, Max Young kick (Drive: 11 plays, 78 yards, 5:22; Mercyhurst 48–7)
- (9:36) NH – AJ Duffy 1-yard run, Liam Quigley kick (Drive: 7 plays, 75 yards, 2:44; Mercyhurst 48–14)

Statistics	NH	MERC
First downs	13	30
Total yards	230	647
Rushing yards	47	268
Passing yards	183	379
Passing: Comp–Att–Int	18–35–1	26–34–1
Time of possession	20:52	39:08

Team	Category	Player	Statistics
New Haven	Passing	AJ Duffy	18/35, 183 yards, TD, INT
New Haven	Rushing	AJ Duffy	5 carries, 37 yards, TD
New Haven	Receiving	Kevonne Wilder	4 receptions, 74 yards
Mercyhurst	Passing	Adam Urena	21/27, 349 yards, 2 TD
Mercyhurst	Rushing	Brian Trobel	10 carries, 115 yards, 3 TD
Mercyhurst	Receiving	Dylan Evans	7 receptions, 157 yards

=== at Albany ===
New Haven Chargers (0-2) at Albany Great Danes (0-2) – Game summary

Quarter	1	2	3	4	Total
Chargers	10	14	0	0	24
Great Danes	0	7	7	3	17

at Tom & Mary Casey Stadium • Albany, NY

- Date: September 13
- Game time: 7:00 p.m. EDT
- Game weather: Cloudy • Temperature: 74 °F (23 °C) • Wind: N at 5 miles per hour (8.0 km/h)
- Game attendance: 6,629
- Referee: Terry Jones
- TV announcers (FloFootball): Rodger Wyland (play-by-play) and Michael Johnson Jr. (analyst)

Game information

First Quarter

- NH – Liam Quigley 38-yard field goal, 7:45. Chargers 3-0. Drive: 8 plays, 47 yards, 3:36
- NH – Matt Chandler 12-yard pass from AJ Duffy (Liam Quigley kick), 1:42. Chargers 10-0. Drive: 6 plays, 63 yards, 2:21

Second Quarter

- NH – Evan Chieca 3-yard pass from AJ Duffy (Liam Quigley kick), 8:10. Chargers 17-0. Drive: 14 plays, 53 yards, 7:20
- NH – Kevonne Wilder 21-yard pass from AJ Duffy (Liam Quigley kick), 5:01. Chargers 24-0. Drive: 4 plays, 44 yards, 1:37
- ALB – Griffin Woodell 1-yard run (James Bozek kick), 1:57. Chargers 24-7. Drive: 10 plays, 75 yards, 3:04

Third Quarter

- ALB – Tavahri Groves 13-yard pass from Jack Shields (James Bozek kick), 7:40. Chargers 24-14. Drive: 9 plays, 52 yards, 4:15

Fourth Quarter

- ALB – James Bozek 45-yard field goal, 5:59. Chargers 24-17. Drive: 9 plays, 46 yards, 4:52

Statistics	NH	ALB
First downs	20	24
Total yards	294	449
Rushing yards	114	40
Passing yards	180	409
Passing: Comp–Att–Int	23–35–0	31–54–2
Time of possession	27:45	32:15

Team	Category	Player	Statistics
New Haven	Passing	AJ Duffy	23/35, 180 yards, 3 TD
New Haven	Rushing	Brian Thomas	11 carries, 43 yards
New Haven	Receiving	Joshua Tracey	5 receptions, 65 yards
Albany	Passing	Jack Shields	31/53, 409 yards, TD, 2 INT
Albany	Rushing	Griffin Woodell	9 carries, 39 yards, TD
Albany	Receiving	Carter Moses	9 receptions, 119 yards

=== Saginaw Valley State (DII) ===
Saginaw Valley State Cardinals (DII) (1-2) vs. New Haven Chargers (1-2) – Game summary

Quarter	1	2	3	4	Total
Cardinals (DII)	0	14	7	7	28
Chargers	14	21	0	0	35

at Ralph F. DellaCamera Stadium • West Haven, CT

- Date: September 20
- Game time: 1:00 PM EDT
- Game weather: Sunny
- Game attendance: 5,467
- Referee: Michael Davis
- TV: NEC Front Row

Game information

First Quarter

- (6:57) NH – Joshua Tracey 5-yard pass from AJ Duffy, Liam Quigley kick (Drive: 5 plays, 84 yards, 2:29; New Haven 7–0)
- (3:18) NH – Logan Schmidt 41-yard pass from AJ Duffy, Liam Quigley kick (Drive: 5 plays, 82 yards, 2:27; New Haven 14–0)

Second Quarter

- (14:52) SVS – Mason McKenzie 28-yard run, Teagen Lenderink kick (Drive: 9 plays, 75 yards, 0:08; New Haven 14–7)
- (12:12) NH – Joshua Tracey 64-yard pass from AJ Duffy, Liam Quigley kick (Drive: 6 plays, 82 yards, 2:36; New Haven 21–7)
- (6:56) NH – Kevonne Wilder 18-yard pass from AJ Duffy, Liam Quigley kick (Drive: 4 plays, 52 yards, 1:52; New Haven 28–7)
- (2:09) NH – Zaon Laney 2-yard run, Liam Quigley kick (Drive: 7 plays, 52 yards, 2:56; New Haven 35–7)
- (0:27) SVS – Terrence Brown Jr. 18-yard pass from Mason McKenzie, Teagen Lenderink kick (Drive: 2 plays, 29 yards, 0:13; New Haven 35–14)

Third Quarter

- (10:45) SVS – Michael Jamerson III 16-yard run, Teagen Lenderink kick (Drive: 3 plays, 33 yards, 1:11; New Haven 35–21)

Fourth Quarter

- (7:38) SVS – Israel Bradford 28-yard pass from Mason McKenzie, Teagen Lenderink kick (Drive: 10 plays, 74 yards, 5:42; New Haven 35–28)

Statistics	SVS	NH
First downs	20	24
Total yards	390	429
Rushing yards	188	111
Passing yards	202	318
Passing: Comp–Att–Int	21–39–1	22–37–2
Time of possession	26:14	30:28

Team	Category	Player	Statistics
Saginaw Valley State	Passing	Mason McKenzie	21/38, 202 yards, 2 TD, INT
Saginaw Valley State	Rushing	Mason McKenzie	11 carries, 88 yards, TD
Saginaw Valley State	Receiving	Terrence Brown Jr.	7 receptions, 71 yards, TD
New Haven	Passing	AJ Duffy	22/37, 318 yards, 4 TD, 2 INT
New Haven	Rushing	Jalen Smith	3 carries, 39 yards
New Haven	Receiving	Kevonne Wilder	8 receptions, 109 yards, TD

=== at Duquesne ===
New Haven Chargers (2-2) vs. Duquesne Dukes (1-3) – Game summary

Quarter	1	2	3	4	Total
Chargers	6	0	6	6	18
Dukes	0	21	14	9	44

at Rooney Field • Pittsburgh, PA

- Date: September 27
- Game time: 12:00 PM EDT
- Game weather: Sunny • Temperature: 70 °F (21 °C) • Wind: W at 3 miles per hour (4.8 km/h)
- Game attendance: 1,078
- Referee: Lance Carlen
- TV announcers (NEC Front Row): Tim Benz (play-by-play) and Ellis Cannon (analyst)

Game information

First Quarter

- (13:23) NH – Joshua Tracey 56-yard pass from AJ Duffy (Drive: 1 play, 56 yards, 0:08; New Haven 6–0)

Second Quarter

- (12:39) DUQ – Joey Isabella 2-yard pass from Tyler Riddell, Matt Marcinko kick (Drive: 10 plays, 95 yards, 5:24; Duquesne 7–6)
- (5:13) DUQ – Joey Isabella 6-yard pass from Tyler Riddell, Matt Marcinko kick (Drive: 10 plays, 60 yards, 6:11; Duquesne 14–6)
- (3:31) DUQ – Joey Isabella 61-yard pass from Tyler Riddell, Matt Marcinko kick (Drive: 2 plays, 61 yards, 0:18; Duquesne 21–6)

Third Quarter

- (6:21) DUQ – Tyler Riddell 10-yard run, Matt Marcinko kick (Drive: 8 plays, 78 yards, 4:00; Duquesne 28–6)
- (6:03) DUQ – Avery Morris 34-yard interception, Matt Marcinko kick (Duquesne 35–6)
- (1:40) NH – Zaon Laney 1-yard run (Drive: 8 plays, 75 yards, 4:23; Duquesne 35–12)

Fourth Quarter

- (11:59) NH – Kevonne Wilder 19-yard pass from AJ Duffy (Drive: 9 plays, 68 yards, 2:56; Duquesne 35–18)
- (11:59) DUQ – DJ Cerisier 100-yard PAT return (Duquesne 37–18)
- (4:51) DUQ – Tyler Riddell 8-yard run, Matt Marcinko kick (Drive: 11 plays, 78 yards, 7:02; Duquesne 44–18)

Statistics	NH	DUQ
First downs	17	22
Total yards	342	499
Rushing yards	149	298
Passing yards	193	201
Passing: Comp–Att–Int	21–32–2	15–23–0
Time of possession	27:05	32:55

Team	Category	Player	Statistics
New Haven	Passing	AJ Duffy	18/29, 184 yards, 2 TD, 2 INT
New Haven	Rushing	Zaon Laney	11 carries, 66 yards, TD
New Haven	Receiving	Kevonne Wilder	8 receptions, 93 yards, TD
Duquesne	Passing	Tyler Riddell	15/23, 201 yards, 3 TD
Duquesne	Rushing	Ness Davis	8 carries, 84 yards
Duquesne	Receiving	Joey Isabella	6 receptions, 92 yards, 3 TD

=== Pace (DII) ===
Pace Setters (DII) (0-5) vs. New Haven Chargers (2-3) – Game summary

Quarter	1	2	3	4	Total
Setters (DII)	7	0	0	7	14
Chargers	13	9	6	0	28

at Ralph F. DellaCamera Stadium • West Haven, CT

- Date: October 4
- Game time: 1:00 p.m. EDT
- Game weather: Sunny
- Game attendance: 6,384
- Referee: Michael Quinn
- TV: NEC Front Row

Game information

First Quarter

- (14:51) PAC – Elizjah Lewis 70-yard pass from Ethan Coady, Marc Malandruccolo kick (Drive: 1 play, 70 yards, 0:09; Pace 7–0)
- (14:13) NH – Zaon Laney 1-yard run (Drive: 2 plays, 14 yards, 0:24; Tied 7–7)
- (3:15) NH – Zaon Laney 6-yard run, Liam Quigley kick (Drive: 5 plays, 62 yards, 2:51; New Haven 13–7)

Second Quarter

- (11:41) NH – Evan Chieca 8-yard pass from AJ Duffy (Drive: 8 plays, 66 yards, 3:52; New Haven 19–7)
- (0:01) NH – Liam Quigley 16-yard field goal (Drive: 13 plays, 71 yards, 5:16; New Haven 22–7)

Third Quarter

- (6:53) NH – Liam Quigley 16-yard field goal (Drive: 7 plays, 82 yards, 3:07; New Haven 25–7)
- (0:11) NH – Liam Quigley 18-yard field goal (Drive: 8 plays, 39 yards, 4:27; New Haven 28–7)

Fourth Quarter

- (6:06) PAC – Elizjah Lewis 16-yard pass from Luke Porcaro, Marc Malandruccolo kick (Drive: 2 plays, 16 yards, 0:16; New Haven 28–14)

Statistics	PAC	NH
First downs	15	23
Total yards	263	431
Rushing yards	-15	289
Passing yards	278	142
Passing: Comp–Att–Int	16–29–1	20–27–1
Time of possession	28:24	31:36

Team	Category	Player	Statistics
Pace	Passing	Ethan Coady	15/26, 262 yards, TD, INT
Pace	Rushing	Jhamier Howard	5 carries, 23 yards
Pace	Receiving	Elizjah Lewis	6 receptions, 167 yards, 2 TD
New Haven	Passing	AJ Duffy	19/24, 142 yards, TD, INT
New Haven	Rushing	Zaon Laney	21 carries, 209 yards, 2 TD
New Haven	Receiving	Kevonne Wilder	6 receptions, 30 yards

=== Western Connecticut (DIII) ===
Western Connecticut Wolves (DIII) (4-0) vs. New Haven Chargers (3-3) – Game summary

Quarter	1	2	3	4	Total
Wolves (DIII)	0	0	0	0	0
Chargers	14	28	24	3	69

at Ralph F. DellaCamera Stadium • West Haven, CT

- Date: October 11
- Game time: 1:00 p.m. EDT
- Game weather: Sunny
- Game attendance: 6,119
- Referee: Dave Stewart
- TV: NEC Front Row

Game information

First Quarter

- (9:13) NH – AJ Duffy 1-yard run, Liam Quigley kick (Drive: 6 plays, 91 yards, 3:13; New Haven 7–0)
- (4:34) NH – Jalen Smith 49-yard pass from AJ Duffy, Liam Quigley kick (Drive: 5 plays, 70 yards, 1:40; New Haven 14–0)

Second Quarter

- (14:03) NH – AJ Duffy 40-yard run, Liam Quigley kick (Drive: 6 plays, 72 yards, 2:31; New Haven 21–0)
- (8:09) NH – Isaac Glaudin 22-yard pass from AJ Duffy, Liam Quigley kick (Drive: 8 plays, 76 yards, 4:16; New Haven 28–0)
- (6:39) NH – Brian Thomas 14-yard pass from AJ Duffy, Liam Quigley kick (Drive: 4 plays, 42 yards, 1:18; New Haven 35–0)
- (3:30) NH – Mark Didio Jr. 20-yard pass from AJ Duffy, Liam Quigley kick (Drive: 5 plays, 55 yards, 2:45; New Haven 42–0)

Third Quarter

- (13:28) NH – Liam Quigley 18-yard field goal (Drive: 5 plays, 57 yards, 1:32; New Haven 45–0)
- (13:11) NH – Brodie Williams 30-yard interception, Liam Quigley kick (New Haven 52–0)
- (9:51) NH – Jalen Smith 71-yard run, Liam Quigley kick (Drive: 2 plays, 96 yards, 0:52; New Haven 59–0)
- (2:39) NH – Ty Cannistraro 4-yard pass from Jake Tripptree, Liam Quigley kick (Drive: 8 plays, 77 yards, 4:44; New Haven 66–0)

Fourth Quarter

- (11:14) NH – Liam Quigley 23-yard field goal (Drive: 6 plays, 24 yards, 3:41; New Haven 69–0)

Statistics	WCSU	NH
First downs	6	27
Total yards	114	736
Rushing yards	12	376
Passing yards	102	360
Passing: Comp–Att–Int	8–22–2	17–23–0
Time of possession	24:39	35:21

Team	Category	Player	Statistics
Western Connecticut	Passing	Dylan Jackson	6/15, 61 yards, INT
Western Connecticut	Rushing	Quasim Benson	7 carries, 27 yards
Western Connecticut	Receiving	Tamarion LaFortune	2 receptions, 34 yards
New Haven	Passing	AJ Duffy	15/21, 354 yards, 4 TD
New Haven	Rushing	Jalen Smith	12 carries, 175 yards, TD
New Haven	Receiving	Isaac Glaudin	4 receptions, 106 yards, TD

=== at LIU ===
New Haven Chargers (4-3) vs. LIU Sharks (2-5) – Game summary

Quarter	1	2	3	4	Total
Chargers	0	16	0	0	16
Sharks	14	14	7	3	38

at Bethpage Federal Credit Union Stadium • Brookville, NY

- Date: October 25
- Game time: 12:00 p.m. EDT
- Game attendance: 1,113
- TV: NEC Front Row

Game information

First Quarter

- (04:29) LIU - Luca Stanzani 7 yard run, Will Johnson kick, (3 plays, 71 yards, TOP 01:20; 7-0 Long Island)
- (00:31) LIU - Luca Stanzani 4 yard run, Will Johnson kick, (7 plays, 39 yards, TOP 01:41; 14-0 Long Island)

Second Quarter

- (13:23) UNH - Luke Kelley safety, (14-2 Long Island)
- (10:58) UNH - Logan Schmidt 28 yard pass from AJ Duffy, Liam Quigley kick, (5 plays, 54 yards, TOP 02:20; 14-9 Long Island)
- (09:34) UNH - Brodie Williams 35 yard interception, Liam Quigley kick, (16-14 New Haven)
- (01:21) LIU - Luca Stanzani 3 yd run, Will Johnson kick, (6 plays, 48 yards, TOP 02:23; 21-16 Long Island)
- (00:48) LIU - Jayden Simpson 33 yd pass from Luca Stanzani, Will Johnson kick, (2 plays, 59 yards, TOP 00:21; 28-16 Long Island)

Third Quarter

- (07:17) LIU - Luca Stanzani 22 yd run, Will Johnson kick, (2 plays, 20 yards, TOP 00:49; 35-16 Long Island)

Fourth Quarter

- (12:31) LIU - Will Johnson 27 yd field goal, (9 plays, 54 yards, TOP 04:59; 38-16 Long Island)

Statistics	NH	LIU
First downs	14	20
Total yards	201	424
Rushing yards	61	272
Passing yards	140	152
Passing: Comp–Att–Int	18–40–2	15–26–1
Time of possession	29:53	30:07

Team	Category	Player	Statistics
New Haven	Passing	AJ Duffy	18/40, 140 yards, 1 TD, 1 INT
New Haven	Rushing	Jalen Smith	18 carries, 36 yards
New Haven	Receiving	Kevonne Wilder	4 receptions, 50 yards
LIU	Passing	Luca Stanzani	15/26, 152 yards, 1 TD, 1 INT
LIU	Rushing	O'Shawn Ross	17 carries, 174 yards
LIU	Receiving	Deion Richardson	6 receptions, 57 yards

=== at Sacred Heart ===
New Haven Chargers (4-4) vs. Sacred Heart Pioneers (5-3) – Game summary

Quarter	1	2	3	4	Total
Chargers	3	7	0	10	20
Pioneers	0	14	7	14	35

at Campus Field • Fairfield, CT

- Date: November 1
- Game time: 12:00 p.m. EDT
- Game attendance: 2,960
- Referee: Travis Barta
- TV announcers (ESPN+): Randy Brochu (play-by-play), Evan Cormier (analyst) and Morgan Bedard (sideline)

Game information

First Quarter

- (01:50) UNH - Liam Quigley 39 yd field goal, (9 plays, 53 yards, TOP 04:14; 3-0 New Haven)

Second Quarter

- (09:43) SHU - Mitchell Summers 6 yd run, Matt Kling kick, (15 plays, 82 yards, TOP 06:59; 7-3 Sacred Heart)
- (05:49) UNH - Jayden Shwed 2 yd run, Liam Quigley kick, (4 plays, 83 yards, TOP 01:34; 10-7 New Haven)
- (00:51) SHU - Mitchell Summers 1 yd run, Matt Kling kick, (11 plays, 75 yards, TOP 04:58; 14-10 Sacred Heart)

Third Quarter

- (08:14) SHU - Chuck Webb 10 yd run, Matt Kling kick, (9 plays, 68 yards, TOP 04:01, 21-10 Sacred Heart)

Fourth Quarter

- (12:39) SHU - Dean Hangey 43 yd pass from Jack Snyder, Matt Kling kick, (1 play, 43 yards, TOP 00:10; 28-10 Sacred Heart)
- (07:28) UNH - Liam Quigley 29 yd field goal, (4 plays, 5 yards, TOP 01:31; 28-13 Sacred Heart)
- (03:16) SHU - Jack Snyder 34 yd run, Matt Kling kick, (9 plays, 75 yards, TOP 04:12; 35-13 Sacred Heart)
- (01:55) UNH - Kevonne Wilder 20 yd pass from AJ Duffy, Liam Quigley kick, (5 plays, 78 yards, TOP 01:15; 35-20 Sacred Heart)

Statistics	NH	SHU
First downs	12	22
Total yards	312	387
Rushing yards	102	229
Passing yards	210	158
Passing: Comp–Att–Int	21-35-1	13-24-0
Time of possession	25:49	34:11

Team	Category	Player	Statistics
New Haven	Passing	AJ Duffy	21/35, 210 yards, 1 TD, 1 INT
New Haven	Rushing	Jalen Smith	9 carries, 102 yards
New Haven	Receiving	Isaac Glaudin	4 receptions, 56 yards
Sacred Heart	Passing	Jack Snyder	13/24, 158 yards, 1 TD
Sacred Heart	Rushing	Mitchell Summers	21 carries, 93 yards, 2 TD
Sacred Heart	Receiving	Dean Hangey	5 receptions, 86 yards, 1 TD

=== Merrimack ===
Merrimack Warriors (3-6) vs. New Haven Chargers (4-5) – Game summary

Quarter	1	2	3	4	Total
Warriors	7	17	0	7	31
Chargers	7	7	10	17	41

at Ralph F. DellaCamera Stadium • West Haven, CT

- Date: November 8
- Game time: 3:30 p.m. EDT
- Game weather: Sunny • Temperature: 62 °F (17 °C) • Wind: W at 7 miles per hour (11 km/h)
- Game attendance: 5,821
- Referee: Dave Stewart
- TV: NEC Front Row

Game information

First Quarter

- (11:05) UNH - AJ Duffy 1 yd run, Liam Quigley kick, (7 plays, 75 yards, TOP 03:55; 7-0 New Haven)
- (02:20) Mer - Ayden Pereira 1 yd run, Carlton Thai kick, (15 plays, 75 yards, TOP 08:45; 7-7 Tied)

Second Quarter

- (09:25) Mer - Galamama Mulbah 1 yd run, Carlton Thai kick, (4 plays, 30 yards, TOP 01:35; 14-7 Marrimack)
- (05:02) UNH - Evan Chieca 20 yd pass from Jayden Shwed, Liam Quigley kick, (9 plays, 72 yards, TOP 04:18; 14-14 Tied)
- (01:06) Mer - Cade Callahan 50 yd pass from Ayden Pereira, Carlton Thai kick, (3 plays, 70 yards, TOP 00:43; 21-14 Merrimack)
- (00:00) Mer - Carlton Thai 29 yd field goal, (5 plays, 64 yards, TOP 00:33; 24-14 Merrimack)

Third Quarter

- (12:19) UNH - Liam Quigley 16 yd field goal, (6 plays, 24 yards, TOP 01:52; 24-17 Merrimack)
- (07:04) UNH - Jonathan Lawson 70 yd pass from AJ Duffy, Liam Quigley kick, (2 plays, 70 yards, TOP 00:18; 24-24 Tied)

Fourth Quarter

- (14:45) UNH - Liam Quigley 29 yd field goal, (8 plays, 59 yards, TOP 02:47; 27-24 New Haven)
- (08:49) UNH - Isaac Glaudin 37 yd pass from AJ Duffy, Liam Quigley kick, (6 plays, 78 yards, TOP 03:27; 34-24 New Haven)
- (05:04) UNH - Kevonne Wilder 60 yd pass from AJ Duffy, Liam Quigley kick, (3 plays, 61 yards, TOP 01:34; 41-21 New Haven)
- (00:07) Mer - Austin Palmer 10 yd pass from Aveon Smith, Carlton Thai kick, (9 plays, 68 yards, TOP 01:55; 41-31 New Haven)

Statistics	MRMK	NH
First downs	23	20
Total yards	365	457
Rushing yards	165	126
Passing yards	200	331
Passing: Comp–Att–Int	13–24–1	16–27–0
Time of possession	35:36	24:24

Team	Category	Player	Statistics
Merrimack	Passing	Ayden Pereira	10/19, 172 yards, TD, INT
Merrimack	Rushing	Galamama Mulbah	9 carries, 44 yards, TD
Merrimack	Receiving	Cade Callahan	2 receptions, 55 yards, TD
New Haven	Passing	AJ Duffy	15/26, 311 yards, 3 TD
New Haven	Rushing	AJ Duffy	12 carries, 70 yards, TD
New Haven	Receiving	Jonathan Lawson	2 receptions, 114 yards, TD
