= History of the New York Institute of Technology =

This article discusses the history of New York Institute of Technology (NYIT). The university was established in 1955 and is located primarily across two main campuses in Old Westbury and New York City, NY.

== 1910 ==
In 1910, the New York Institute of Technology's predecessor, New York Technical Institute, received its license from the state of New York.

== 1950-1960: Founding ==
Provisional charter was granted by the New York State Board of Regents to New York Institute of Technology in 1955. The founders of New York Institute of Technology, and in particular Dr. Alexander Schure, Ph.D., started the current university as a career-oriented school that offered engineering-related training and applications-oriented research opportunities. New York Institute of Technology began in operations in 1955 in New York City with only nine students. Its first campus opened at 500 Pacific Street in the borough of Brooklyn, New York with Shure serving as institute's first president. To address a concern in American academia at the time, an overemphasis in applied engineering and STEM fields while humanities studies were overshadowed, NYIT's early curriculum required students to attend courses in career-training studies and liberal arts education.

In the early years of its founding, NYIT administrators focused the school on "access to opportunity" with a largely open-enrollment system for New York City's public high school graduates. This admissions strategy was well received, resulting in rapid enrollment growth. By the 1958–1959 academic year, NYIT had more than 300 students and the time had come to expand its physical operations. The college purchased the Pythian Temple at 135-145 W. 70th St. in Manhattan as its university campus in 1958 while the original Brooklyn location was converted the college's Division of General Studies. Its Manhattan building, adjacent to the Lincoln Center for the Performing Arts, was an ornate, 12-story structure with a columned entranceway. Built in 1929 at a cost of $2 million, it included among its features a huge 1,200-seat auditorium that is still in use as of 2020.

Also in 1958, the institute sponsored the first National Technology Awards, created by Frederick Pittera, an organizer of international fairs and a member of the NYIT Board of Trustees, to raise funds for NYIT science and technology laboratories. The awards, held at the Waldorf-Astoria Hotel with entertainment provided by the U.S. Air Force Band. 36th President of the United States Lyndon Johnson was a keynote speaker and opening speeches were broadcast nationally by the ABC Radio Network. Among the institute's honorees were Dr. Wernher von Braun and Major General Bernard Schriever, a Commanding General of the Ballistic Air Command.

== 1960-1970: Old Westbury Campus ==
In 1960 NYIT received a provisional charter from the Board of Regents to operate as a four-year college with the ability to grant bachelor's degrees. A permanent charter was granted in 1962 with enrollment for 1,500 students and temporary sites in Syosset were opened as school officials searched for a permanent campus on Long Island that could accommodate the larger enrollment. In 1965, officials decided on a 280-acre tract of the Cornelius Vanderbilt Whitney estate in Old Westbury and a number of adjoining properties in Brookville and Old Brookville for its 1050-acre campus. The estate buildings and stables were initially renovated to be used as classroom space. The School of Architecture and Design was placed on the estate's chicken coop, the feathers and manure of which were once burned in underground ovens behind the structure, and the smell from this furnace occasioned many complaints from adjoining estates during the construction process. Additionally, mansions such as "Delbarton" (constructed in 1916 for I. Townsend Burton) and "French House" (constructed in 1924 for Flora Whitney) were adaptively reused as student housing and lecture halls. Thirty-five hundred students attended NYIT in fall 1965, an increase of 1,000 over the previous year and the college's enrollment now included international students.

NYIT was also recognized for its early implementation of computational technology in undergraduate education at the time. A grant from the Carnegie Corporation of New York allowed the school develop an automated, self-instructional engineer training system prior to the advent of personal computers. NYIT was also involved in efforts to use mainframes as a teaching tool. The institute received its first computer, donated by the CIT Financial Corporation, in 1965 and received two grants totaling approximately $3 million from the federal government to develop a "system of individualized learning" through the use of computers as well as a computer-based course in general physics for midshipmen at the United States Naval Academy in Annapolis, Maryland.

Student organizations increased through the 1960s as NYIT's Old Westbury student newspaper, the Campus Slate, published its first issue in September 1966; the first Old Westbury student drama production, "Tea and Sympathy," was performed in November 1966; and the Old Westbury Student Activity Center opened in December 1969. The Manhattan campus concurrently published its own newspaper, the Scope, and began producing plays in 1964. In 1965, WNYT, the college's first campus radio station, began broadcasting in the university's basement cafeteria.

== 1970-1980: Medical School Expansion and Computer Animation Recognition ==
NYIT was accredited by the Middle States Association of Colleges and Secondary Schools in 1970 and launched its first master's program, a Master of Business Administration, and started its alumni association, the first organization created to help graduates network after leaving school. Total enrollment reached 5000 students during this time and at the start of the 1971 academic year, the university moved its Manhattan campus to a newly constructed 45-story skyscraper at 888 Seventh Avenue, and later to its current location at 61st Street and Broadway in 1976. Renovations also continued at the Old Westbury campus, with the former Alfred I. du Pont mansion opening in 1972 as the de Seversky Conference Center, named after NYIT board member and aviation designer Alexander P. de Seversky. The renovated center housed the university's culinary arts, hospitality management, and communication arts programs. New degrees were also added to NYIT's career-training programs during this time. In 1973, the college received approval to award Bachelor of Architecture degrees accredited by the National Architecture Accrediting Board.

The a Computer Graphics lab was also opened, with many contemporary 3-D computer animation techniques descending from NYIT's Computer Graphics Lab (CGL), which would pioneer the field for nearly two decades. Noted alumni of the lab included Pixar co-founders Edwin Catmull and Alvy Ray Smith, Walt Disney's Chief Scientist Lance Joseph Williams, DreamWorks animator Hank Grebe, Computer Media Artist Rebecca Allen and Netscape and Silicon Graphics founder Jim Clark. Researchers at the lab created the tools that made entirely 3D CGI films possible. NYIT CG Lab was also regarded as a top computer animation research and development group internationally during the late 70s and early 80s. The 1970s also saw the invention of the digital noise reducer by William E. Glenn, Ph.D., which earned the college its first television Emmy award in 1978. Glenn's research at the school's Science and Research Center also led to the college receiving a patent in 3-D technology in 1979.

=== New York Institute of Technology College of Osteopathic Medicine ===
NYIT also established the New York College of Osteopathic Medicine (NYCOM) in 1977, the first osteopathic medical school in the state of New York. W. Kenneth Riland served as a co-founder and founding dean of the college, which has since grown to enroll the largest number of medical students on a single campus in the United States. Notable alumni affiliated with the university include Humayun Chaudhry, president and chief executive officer of the Federation of State Medical Boards (FSMB), Richard Jadick, a Bronze-Star naval surgeon who saved the lives of 30 marines and sailors during the Second Battle of Fallujah, Kevin O'Connor (physician), White House physician to president Joe Biden, Mikhail Varshavski, a You-Tube internet celebrity and family medicine doctor, Amit M. Shelat, Vice Chairman of the New York State Board for Medicine, and Barbara Ross-Lee, the first African-American woman to serve as dean of a U.S. medical school.

== 1980-2000: Central Islip Campus and International Programs ==
In 1980s, NYIT's student-run newspaper The Campus Slate's journalism infrastructure were upgraded to conduct several mainstream interviews, including with Oscar-nominated actress Diane Lane and The Beach Boys. During this time, the university's founding president resigned as his son, Matthew Schure, Ph.D., was named president of the college. NYIT continued to expand, opening a third campus in Central Islip, N.Y., in September 1984 at the former Central Islip Psychiatric Center. Less than 10 years later, the school would selling pieces off for commercial use. NYIT ceased operations in 2005 as a full college campus though at one point, the location included student lounges, laundry facilities, dining hall, classroom buildings, and library. The school still operates its 7,000-square-foot Central Islip Family Medical Center, located near the former campus, to serve the local community. The university also launched the American Open University of NYIT in November 1984, a "virtual campus" that offered distance-education programs. The World Health Organization designated the medical school in 1988 as one of three collaborative centers for occupational medicine in the United States. NYIT's own advertising program advanced that year with the creation of a student-run advertising agency, the Carleton Group, at the Central Islip location. During this time, NYIT was also one of only two colleges in the state that offered a concentration in advertising.

In 1991, the school graduated its 1000th physician and NYCOM established a minority and disadvantaged Post Baccalaureate Future Physicians Program in 1994. In 1998, NYCOM opened the Adele Smithers Parkinson's Disease Center which provides medical care, promotes community awareness and Parkinson's disease education, fosters scientific studies and medical research, and helps individual patients achieve and maintain the best quality of life possible while coping with the disease.

In 1998, NYIT opened a program in Nanjing as the first American university to open an international campus in China. The college also established international programs in Canada and the Middle East. In 1999, Bill Gates spoke at NYIT and received NYIT's Presidential Medal.

== 2000-today: International Expansion ==
In 1996, NYIT Old Westbury placed 90 acres of property for sale, including Flora Whitney's "French House." It was purchased 4 years later and demolished shortly thereafter.

In 2000 Edward Guiliano, Ph.D., was named the college's third president. After the September 11, 2001 attacks, NYIT received a $300,000 federal grant to build a new cybersecurity lab to meet the growing need for students trained to defend organizations against cyber attacks.

In 2002, NYIT expanded its Manhattan campus and in 2003 launched Ellis College of NYIT, an online undergraduate school originally established for working adults. The online university was established by Cardean, a for-profit educational corporation, which partnered with NYIT for accreditation. The program closed less than four years later after a 2008 joint lawsuit from the US Department of Education and the U.S. Attorney for the Southern District of New York claimed Cardean had recruited students to Ellis College and paid the recruiters based on how many students enrolled. Federal financial aid regulations prohibit basing recruiters’ pay on how many students they enroll. The university partnership was severed following the lawsuit, which was settled in 2013 for $4 million USD for the illegal compensation structure. In response to a diminished enrollment and mounting costs, NYIT reorganized its Central Islip campus in 2004 into a community service facility with most of the academic programs relocated to the Old Westbury and Manhattan campuses. Remaining in Central Islip were the culinary arts program and its restaurant, the Epicurean Room, the Vocational Independence Program (VIP) for students with learning disabilities, a family medical center, the Technology-Based Learning Research Center, and the BOCES and Head Start programs. Parts of the campus not in use were sold to developers for commercial use. The third main campus had featured Georgian buildings which housed the college's first and only on-campus residential facility. The school currently leases dormitories of SUNY-Old Westbury for residential undergraduate programs that relocated to the Old Westbury location from Central Islip.

In 2005, NYIT participated in its first Solar Decathlon, an international competition sponsored by the U.S. Department of Energy. NYIT was one of 19 colleges internationally and the only school in the New York metropolitan area participating in the competition. The team captured fifth-place honors. Since 2005, NYIT has also included an international focus in its degree program expansions, establishing a campus in Abu Dhabi, located in the Center of Excellence for Applied Research and Training (CERT) Technology Park. NYIT-Abu Dhabi is also the first American university in Abu Dhabi. The university's past presenters included U.S. Secretary of Education Margaret Spellings. In 2007, NYIT co-hosted the International Energy Conference and Exhibition in Daegu, South Korea. In that year, the university also received $500,000 in federal funding to develop a "green print" initiative to research alternative fuel technology and determine the university's carbon footprint. In 2008, NYIT installed a 3-D motion capture lab for its Fine Arts program at its Old Westbury campus, which was awarded a $130,000 research contract by United Space Alliance in partnership with NASA to design the crew module of the Orion spacecraft using 3-D motion capture technology. NYIT's College of Osteopathic Medicine also uses 3-D motion capture technology to identify mobility and stability problems in patients with Parkinson's disease. NYIT also sponsored the first annual International Water Conference in July 2008 at the United Nations in New York City. The following year, NYIT sponsored its second U.N. event, the International Energy Conference to examine opportunities and innovations in the field of sustainable technology. Notable commencement speakers at NYIT have included George Pataki, the 53rd Governor of New York, Sanjay Kumar, chairman and CEO of CA Technologies and Chuck Schumer, United States Senator from New York, among others.

In 2016, NYIT placed first at the Long Island regional round of the New York State Business Plan Competition, Stony Brook University placed second. NYIT also won first place in The VEX Robotics Competition. The National Security Agency and the Department of Homeland Security designated NYIT as a National Center of Academic Excellence in Cyber Defense Education and the university received a $0.3 million grant for smartphone security research from National Science Foundation. NYIT also currently houses the fastest broadband network on the East Coast.

In early 2020, NYIT had reached an agreement with Extell Developments to sell several buildings at its Manhattan location in order to focus resources on its College of Osteopathic Medicine at the Old Westbury campus. Extell has since left the purchase agreement following a 2021 lawsuit that claims NYIT's decision to retain its Manhattan campus and reverse relocation plans due to financial difficulties following the COVID-19 pandemic had been made in violation of the purchase contract.

== Presidents ==
- Alexander Schure, Ph.D. - 1955-1982
- Matthew Schure, Ph.D. - 1982-2000
- Edward Guiliano, Ph.D. - 2000–2017
- Hank Foley, Ph.D. - 2017–2025
- Jerry Balentine, D.O. - 2025–Present
