= 2025 Robert Morris Colonials football team =

American college football season

2025 Robert Morris Colonials football
- Conference: Northeast Conference
- Record: 3–9 (2–5 NEC)
- Head coach: Bernard Clark (8th season)
- Offensive coordinator: Troy Rothenbuhler (1st season)
- Defensive coordinator: Jason Makrinos (1st season)
- Home stadium: Joe Walton Stadium

2025 Northeast Conference football standings
	Conf.			Overall
Team	W		L	W		L
Central Connecticut $^	6	–	1	8	–	5
Duquesne	5	–	2	7	–	5
Mercyhurst*	4	–	3	5	–	7
LIU	4	–	3	6	–	6
Wagner	4	–	3	5	–	7
Stonehill	3	–	4	4	–	8
Robert Morris	2	–	5	3	–	9
New Haven*	0	–	0	5	–	5
Saint Francis	0	–	7	0	–	11
$ – Conference champion; ^ – FCS playoff participant; * – Ineligible for NEC title and FCS postseason play due to transition from NCAA Division II.; Rankings from STATS Poll

The 2025 Robert Morris Colonials football team represented Robert Morris University as a member of the Northeast Conference (NEC) during the 2025 NCAA Division I FCS football season. The Colonials, who were led by eighth-year head coach Bernard Clark, played home games at the Joe Walton Stadium in Moon Township, Pennsylvania.

== Preseason ==
=== Preseason coaches' poll ===
The NEC released their preseason coaches' poll on 4 August 2025. The Colonials were picked to finish in third place, tied with LIU.

== Schedule ==
Date	Time	Opponent	Site	TV	Result	Attendance
August 30	2:00 p.m.	at West Virginia*	Milan Puskar Stadium; Morgantown, WV	ESPN+	L 3–45	57,093
September 6	2:00 p.m.	at Youngstown State*	Stambaugh Stadium; Youngstown, OH	ESPN+	L 17–56	12,042
September 13	6:00 p.m.	West Liberty*	Joe Walton Stadium; Moon Township, PA	NEC Front Row	W 28–14	2,575
September 20	2:00 p.m.	Dayton*	Joe Walton Stadium; Moon Township, PA	NEC Front Row	L 14–17	2,389
October 4	1:00 p.m.	at Merrimack*	Duane Stadium; North Andover, MA	ESPN+/NESN+	L 7–24	15,426
October 11	2:00 p.m.	Central Connecticut^{†}	Joe Walton Stadium; Moon Township, PA	NEC Front Row	L 12–24	2,789
October 18	12:00 p.m.	at LIU	Bethpage Federal Credit Union Stadium; Brookville, NY	NEC Front Row	L 7–17	1,061
October 25	3:00 p.m.	at Saint Francis	DeGol Field; Loretto, PA	NEC Front Row	W 24–14	1,381
November 1	1:00 p.m.	at Stonehill	W.B. Mason Stadium; Easton, MA	NEC Front Row	W 20–17	900
November 8	12:00 p.m.	Wagner	Joe Walton Stadium; Moon Township, PA	NEC Front Row	L 20–24	1,267
November 15	2:00 p.m.	at Mercyhurst	Saxon Stadium; Erie, PA	NEC Front Row	L 13–27	857
November 22	2:00 p.m.	Duquesne	Joe Walton Stadium; Moon Township, PA	NEC Front Row	L 17–20	2,716
*Non-conference game; ^{†}Homecoming; All times are in Eastern time

== Game summaries ==
=== at West Virginia (FBS) ===
Robert Morris Colonials (0–0) at West Virginia Mountaineers (FBS) (0–0) – Game summary

Quarter	1	2	3	4	Total
Colonials	0	3	0	0	3
Mountaineers (FBS)	7	3	14	21	45

at Milan Puskar Stadium • Morgantown, West Virginia

- Date: August 30
- Game time: 2:00 p.m.
- Game weather:
- Game attendance: 57,093
- Referee: Kevin Boitmann
- TV announcers (ESPN+): Brian Custer, Max Starks

Game information

First quarter

- WVU – Nicco Marchiol 10-yard run (Kade Hensley kick), 10:15. Mountaineers 7–0. Drive: 10 plays, 83 yards, 3:22.

Second quarter

- WVU – Kade Hensley 27-yard field goal, 11:44. Mountaineers 10–0. Drive: 13 plays, 75 yards, 4:51.
- RMU – Jayson Jenkins 36-yard field goal, 3:08. Mountaineers 10–3. Drive: 5 plays, 18 yards, 1:43.

Third quarter

- WVU – Jahiem White 1-yard run (Kade Hensley kick), 11:21. Mountaineers 17–3. Drive: 9 plays, 64 yards, 3:33.
- WVU – Jahiem White 4-yard run (Kade Hensley kick), 5:21. Mountaineers 24–3. Drive: 3 plays, 24 yards, 0:51.

Fourth quarter

- WVU – Cam Vaughn 46-yard pass from Nicco Marchiol (Kade Hensley kick), 13:52. Mountaineers 31–3. Drive: 10 plays, 81 yards, 3:24.
- WVU – Cyncir Bowers 26-yard run (Kade Hensley kick), 10:16. Mountaineers 38–3. Drive: 4 plays, 54 yards, 1:51.
- WVU – Scotty Fox Jr. 59-yard run (Kade Hensley kick), 3:15. Mountaineers 45–3. Drive: 3 plays, 71 yards, 1:00.

Statistics	RMU	WVU
First downs	8	26
Plays–yards	59–123	76–625
Rushes–yards	37–53	53–393
Passing yards	70	232
Passing: comp–att–int	7–22–0	18–23–0
Turnovers	0	4
Time of possession	32:30	27:30

Team	Category	Player	Statistics
Robert Morris	Passing	Zach Tanner	7/21, 70 yards
Robert Morris	Rushing	Ethan Shine	8 carries, 20 yards
Robert Morris	Receiving	Thomas Lee	2 receptions, 22 yards
West Virginia	Passing	Nicco Marchiol	17/20, 224 yards, TD
West Virginia	Rushing	Jahiem White	18 carries, 93 yards, 2 TD
West Virginia	Receiving	Cam Vaughn	7 receptions, 126 yards, TD

=== at Youngstown State ===
Robert Morris Colonials (0-1) at Youngstown State Penguins (1-0) – Game summary

Quarter	1	2	3	4	Total
Colonials	3	0	0	14	17
Penguins	14	28	14	0	56

at Stambaugh Stadium • Youngstown, OH

- Date: September 6
- Game time: 2:00 PM EDT
- Game weather: Cloudy • Temperature: 67 °F (19 °C) • Wind: SW at 10 miles per hour (16 km/h)
- Game attendance: 12,042
- Referee: Tyler Downs
- TV announcers (ESPN+): Drae Smith (play-by-play) and Chris Sammarone (analyst)

Game information

First quarter

- (8:19) RMU – Jayson Jenkins 46-yard field goal (Drive: 11 plays, 46 yards, 6:41; RMU 3–0)
- (4:41) YSU – Max Tomczak 1-yard pass from Beau Brungard, Andrew Lastovka kick (Drive: 8 plays, 91 yards, 3:33; YSU 7–3)
- (3:03) YSU – Beau Brungard 72-yard run, Andrew Lastovka kick (Drive: 2 plays, 78 yards, 0:36; YSU 14–3)

Second quarter

- (13:45) YSU – Beau Brungard 20-yard run, Andrew Lastovka kick (Drive: 6 plays, 63 yards, 3:12; YSU 21–3)
- (9:37) YSU – Antuan Gardner 2-yard run, Andrew Lastovka kick (Drive: 2 plays, 80 yards, 1:00; YSU 28–3)
- (1:54) YSU – Beau Brungard 4-yard run, Andrew Lastovka kick (Drive: 12 plays, 85 yards, 5:02; YSU 35–3)
- (0:12) YSU – Kylon Wilson 4-yard run, Andrew Lastovka kick (Drive: 5 plays, 17 yards, 1:31; YSU 42–3)

Third quarter

- (12:51) YSU – Beau Brungard 28-yard run, Andrew Lastovka kick (Drive: 4 plays, 69 yards, 2:00; YSU 49–3)
- (7:04) YSU – Tahir Mills 18-yard run, Andrew Lastovka kick (Drive: 7 plays, 80 yards, 4:13; YSU 56–3)

Fourth quarter

- (13:16) RMU – Thomas Lee 34-yard pass from Zach Tanner, Jayson Jenkins kick (Drive: 6 plays, 49 yards, 2:57; YSU 56–10)
- (1:29) RMU – Kai Holloway 16-yard pass from Zach Tanner, Jayson Jenkins kick (Drive: 12 plays, 80 yards, 5:56; YSU 56–17)

Statistics	RMU	YSU
First downs	14	27
Total yards	233	593
Rushing yards	41	424
Passing yards	192	169
Passing: Comp–Att–Int	16–29–0	20–24–0
Time of possession	28:40	31:20

Team	Category	Player	Statistics
Robert Morris	Passing	Zach Tanner	16/29, 192 yards, 2 TD
Robert Morris	Rushing	Donta Whack	10 carries, 37 yards
Robert Morris	Receiving	Thomas Lee	5 receptions, 75 yards, TD
Youngstown State	Passing	Beau Brungard	12/16, 122 yards, TD
Youngstown State	Rushing	Beau Brungard	10 carries, 264 yards, 4 TD
Youngstown State	Receiving	Max Tomczak	5 receptions, 69 yards, TD

=== West Liberty (DII) ===
West Liberty Hilltoppers (DII) (0-2) vs. Robert Morris Colonials (0-2) – Game summary

Quarter	1	2	3	4	Total
Hilltoppers (DII)	0	0	7	7	14
Colonials	7	7	7	7	28

at Joe Walton Stadium • Moon Township, PA

- Date: September 13
- Game time: 6:00 PM EDT
- Game weather: Cloudy • Temperature: 81 °F (27 °C) • Wind: SW at 5 miles per hour (8.0 km/h)
- Game attendance: 2,575
- Referee: Michael Quinn
- TV: NEC Front Row

Game information

First Quarter

- (5:17) RMU – Thomas Lee 10-yard pass from Zach Tanner, Jayson Jenkins kick (Drive: 10 plays, 92 yards, 6:08; Robert Morris 7–0)

Second Quarter

- (14:56) RMU – Donta Whack 2-yard run, Jayson Jenkins kick (Drive: 7 plays, 51 yards, 3:39; Robert Morris 14–0)

Third Quarter

- (10:15) RMU – Jaqai Carter 4-yard pass from Zach Tanner, Jayson Jenkins kick (Drive: 4 plays, 23 yards, 2:32; Robert Morris 21–0)
- (3:06) WLIB – Jaedon Alston 10-yard run, Morgan Williamson kick (Drive: 2 plays, 22 yards, 0:18; Robert Morris 21–7)

Fourth Quarter

- (14:56) RMU – Ethan Shine 1-yard run, Jayson Jenkins kick (Drive: 6 plays, 48 yards, 3:01; Robert Morris 28–7)
- (9:14) WLIB – Levi Gullion 10-yard pass from Kohl Meisman, Morgan Williamson kick (Drive: 11 plays, 73 yards, 5:37; Robert Morris 28–14)

Statistics	WLIB	RMU
First downs	22	18
Total yards	282	325
Rushing yards	63	242
Passing yards	219	83
Passing: Comp–Att–Int	20–35–2	8–9–0
Time of possession	31:12	26:54

Team	Category	Player	Statistics
West Liberty	Passing	Kohl Meisman	20/34, 219 yards, TD, 2 INT
West Liberty	Rushing	Hunter Patterson	14 carries, 26 yards
West Liberty	Receiving	Trey Singleton	6 receptions, 78 yards
Robert Morris	Passing	Zach Tanner	8/9, 83 yards, 2 TD
Robert Morris	Rushing	Ethan Shine	20 carries, 133 yards, TD
Robert Morris	Receiving	Thomas Lee	5 receptions, 44 yards, TD

=== Dayton ===
Dayton Flyers (1-1) vs. Robert Morris Colonials (1-2) – Game summary

Quarter	1	2	3	4	Total
Flyers	0	7	0	10	17
Colonials	7	0	7	0	14

at Joe Walton Stadium • Moon Township, PA

- Date: September 20
- Game time: 2:00 PM EDT
- Game weather: Sunny
- Game attendance: 2,389
- Referee: Lance Carlen
- TV announcers (NEC Front Row): Chris Shovlin (play-by-play) and Ray Thomas (analyst)

Game information

First Quarter

- (0:16) RMU – Ethan Shine 2-yard run, Jayson Jenkins kick (Drive: 9 plays, 66 yards, 6:18; Robert Morris 7–0)

Second Quarter

- (5:45) DAY – Gavin Lochow 7-yard pass from Bryce Schondelmyer, Robby Smart kick (Drive: 9 plays, 67 yards, 4:35; Tied 7–7)

Third Quarter

- (7:41) RMU – Ethan Shine 9-yard run, Jayson Jenkins kick (Drive: 11 plays, 75 yards, 7:19; Robert Morris 14–7)

Fourth Quarter

- (12:35) DAY – Luke Hansen 19-yard pass from Bryce Schondelmyer, Robby Smart kick (Drive: 8 plays, 71 yards, 3:54; Tied 14–14)
- (3:28) DAY – Robby Smart 21-yard field goal (Drive: 9 plays, 77 yards, 5:45; Dayton 17–14)

Statistics	DAY	RMU
First downs	16	18
Total yards	284	264
Rushing yards	97	149
Passing yards	187	115
Passing: Comp–Att–Int	13–20–0	10–25–0
Time of possession	26:40	33:20

Team	Category	Player	Statistics
Dayton	Passing	Bryce Schondelmyer	13/20, 187 yards, 2 TD
Dayton	Rushing	Mason Hackett	19 carries, 94 yards
Dayton	Receiving	Michael Mussari	3 receptions, 52 yards
Robert Morris	Passing	Zach Tanner	7/15, 89 yards
Robert Morris	Rushing	Ethan Shine	16 carries, 55 yards, 2 TD
Robert Morris	Receiving	Jaqai Carter	1 reception, 31 yards

=== at Merrimack ===
Robert Morris Colonials (1-3) vs. Merrimack Warriors (2-3) – Game summary

Quarter	1	2	3	4	Total
Colonials	7	0	0	0	7
Warriors	3	7	0	14	24

at Duane Stadium • North Andover, MA

- Date: October 4
- Game time: 1:00 p.m. EDT
- Game weather: Sunny
- Game attendance: 15,426
- Referee: Lance Carlen
- TV announcers (ESPN+/NESN+): John Avino (play-by-play), Jacob VanRyn (analyst) and Natalie Noury (sideline)

Game information

First Quarter

- (9:26) RMU – Chaz Middleton 12-yard pass from Cooper Panteck, Jayson Jenkins kick (Drive: 5 plays, 92 yards, 2:49; Robert Morris 7–0)
- (3:22) MER – Carlton Thai 34-yard field goal (Drive: 11 plays, 44 yards, 5:56; Robert Morris 7–3)

Second Quarter

- (1:53) MER – Brendon Wyatt 20-yard pass from Aveon Smith, Carlton Thai kick (Drive: 12 plays, 60 yards, 6:48; Merrimack 10–7)

Third Quarter

No scoring plays

Fourth Quarter

- (10:01) MER – Ayden Pereira 5-yard run, Carlton Thai kick (Drive: 12 plays, 80 yards, 7:35; Merrimack 17–7)
- (3:31) MER – DeMarcus McElroy 1-yard run, Carlton Thai kick (Drive: 6 plays, 97 yards, 3:50; Merrimack 24–7)

Statistics	RMU	MRMK
First downs	10	20
Total yards	221	337
Rushing yards	94	223
Passing yards	127	114
Passing: Comp–Att–Int	12–23–2	8–17–1
Time of possession	20:56	39:04

Team	Category	Player	Statistics
Robert Morris	Passing	Cooper Panteck	11/21, 120 yards, TD, 2 INT
Robert Morris	Rushing	Owen McGraw	1 carry, 74 yards
Robert Morris	Receiving	Richard Ransom	3 receptions, 49 yards
Merrimack	Passing	Ayden Pereira	5/13, 73 yards, INT
Merrimack	Rushing	DeMarcus McElroy	7 carries, 98 yards, TD
Merrimack	Receiving	Cade Callahan	1 reception, 39 yards

=== Central Connecticut ===
Central Connecticut Blue Devils (3-3) vs. Robert Morris Colonials (1-4) – Game summary

Quarter	1	2	3	4	Total
Blue Devils	14	0	7	3	24
Colonials	0	0	0	12	12

at Joe Walton Stadium • Moon Township, PA

- Date: October 11
- Game time: 2:00 PM EDT
- Game weather: Sunny • Temperature: 66 °F (19 °C) • Wind: NW at 1 mile per hour (1.6 km/h)
- Game attendance: 2,789
- Referee: Jonathan Grande
- TV announcers (NEC Front Row): Chris Shovlin (play-by-play) and Ray Thomas (analyst)

Game information

First Quarter

- (5:07) CCSU – Donovan Wadley 34-yard pass from Brady Olsen, Jack Hennessey kick (Drive: 7 plays, 57 yards, 3:13; Central Connecticut 7–0)
- (0:54) CCSU – Elijah Howard 29-yard run, Jack Hennessey kick (Drive: 5 plays, 57 yards, 2:30; Central Connecticut 14–0)

Second Quarter

No scoring plays

Third Quarter

- (13:33) CCSU – Devon Anderson 55-yard interception, Jack Hennessey kick (Central Connecticut 21–0)

Fourth Quarter

- (10:48) RMU – Chaz Middleton 6-yard pass from Jake Wolfe (Drive: 7 plays, 46 yards, 2:30; Central Connecticut 21–6)
- (8:54) RMU – Donta Whack 7-yard run (Drive: 4 plays, 53 yards, 1:52; Central Connecticut 21–12)
- (4:24) CCSU – Jack Hennessey 35-yard field goal (Drive: 9 plays, 45 yards, 4:12; Central Connecticut 24–12)

Statistics	CCSU	RMU
First downs	22	19
Total yards	350	431
Rushing yards	163	75
Passing yards	187	356
Passing: Comp–Att–Int	19–34–0	25–42–2
Time of possession	27:37	32:23

Team	Category	Player	Statistics
Central Connecticut	Passing	Brady Olson	19/34, 187 yards, TD
Central Connecticut	Rushing	Elijah Howard	16 carries, 131 yards, TD
Central Connecticut	Receiving	Michael Trovarelli	3 receptions, 41 yards
Robert Morris	Passing	Cooper Panteck	16/30, 223 yards, 2 INT
Robert Morris	Rushing	Donta Whack	12 carries, 40 yards, TD
Robert Morris	Receiving	Chaz Middleton	9 receptions, 186 yards, TD

=== at LIU ===
Robert Morris Colonials (1-5) vs. LIU Sharks (1-5) – Game summary

Quarter	1	2	3	4	Total
Colonials	0	0	0	7	7
Sharks	0	14	0	3	17

at Bethpage Federal Credit Union Stadium • Brookville, NY

- Date: October 18
- Game time: 12:00 p.m. EDT
- Game weather: Sunny
- Game attendance: 1,061
- Referee: Mike Quinn
- TV announcers (NEC Front Row): Phil Constantino (play-by-play) and Jim Wright (analyst)

Game information

First Quarter

No scoring plays

Second Quarter

- (13:30) LIU – O'Shawn Ross 6-yard run, Will Johnson kick (Drive: 10 plays, 66 yards, 5:57; LIU 7–0)
- (2:28) LIU – Jaiden Dozier 5-yard pass from Luca Stanzani, Will Johnson kick (Drive: 4 plays, 15 yards, 1:39; LIU 14–0)

Third Quarter

No scoring plays

Fourth Quarter

- (11:25) RMU – Ethan Shine 66-yard pass from Zach Tanner, Jayson Jenkins kick (Drive: 3 plays, 91 yards, 1:43; LIU 14–7)
- (1:03) LIU – Will Johnson 42-yard field goal (Drive: 7 plays, 15 yards, 3:11; LIU 21–7)

Statistics	RMU	LIU
First downs	7	18
Total yards	224	300
Rushing yards	47	197
Passing yards	177	103
Passing: Comp–Att–Int	14–27–1	15–26–1
Time of possession	21:50	38:10

Team	Category	Player	Statistics
Robert Morris	Passing	Zach Tanner	14/26, 177 yards, TD, INT
Robert Morris	Rushing	Ethan Shine	9 carries, 24 yards
Robert Morris	Receiving	Ethan Shine	8 receptions, 119 yards, TD
LIU	Passing	Luca Stanzani	15/26, 103 yards, TD, INT
LIU	Rushing	O'Shawn Ross	23 carries, 110 yards, TD
LIU	Receiving	O'Shawn Ross	6 receptions, 26 yards

=== at Saint Francis (PA) ===
Robert Morris Colonials (1-6) vs. Saint Francis Red Flash (0-6) – Game summary

Quarter	1	2	3	4	Total
Colonials	-	-	-	-	0
Red Flash	-	-	-	-	0

at DeGol Field • Loretto, PA

- Date: October 25
- Game time: 3:00 p.m. EDT
- TV: NEC Front Row

Statistics	RMU	SFPA
First downs		
Total yards		
Rushing yards		
Passing yards		
Passing: Comp–Att–Int		
Time of possession		

Team	Category	Player	Statistics
Robert Morris	Passing		
Robert Morris	Rushing		
Robert Morris	Receiving		
Saint Francis (PA)	Passing		
Saint Francis (PA)	Rushing		
Saint Francis (PA)	Receiving		

=== at Stonehill ===
Robert Morris Colonials (2-6) vs. Stonehill Skyhawks (3-5) – Game summary

Quarter	1	2	3	4	Total
Colonials	-	-	-	-	0
Skyhawks	-	-	-	-	0

at W.B. Mason Stadium • Easton, MA

- Date: November 1
- Game time: 1:00 PM EDT
- TV: NEC Front Row

Statistics	RMU	STO
First downs		
Total yards		
Rushing yards		
Passing yards		
Passing: Comp–Att–Int		
Time of possession		

Team	Category	Player	Statistics
Robert Morris	Passing		
Robert Morris	Rushing		
Robert Morris	Receiving		
Stonehill	Passing		
Stonehill	Rushing		
Stonehill	Receiving		

=== Wagner ===
Wagner Seahawks (3-6) vs. Robert Morris Colonials (3-6) – Game summary

Quarter	1	2	3	4	Total
Seahawks	-	-	-	-	0
Colonials	-	-	-	-	0

at Joe Walton Stadium • Moon Township, PA

- Date: November 8
- Game time: 12:00 PM EST
- TV: NEC Front Row

Statistics	WAG	RMU
First downs		
Total yards		
Rushing yards		
Passing yards		
Passing: Comp–Att–Int		
Time of possession		

Team	Category	Player	Statistics
Wagner	Passing		
Wagner	Rushing		
Wagner	Receiving		
Robert Morris	Passing		
Robert Morris	Rushing		
Robert Morris	Receiving		

=== at Mercyhurst ===
Robert Morris Colonials (0-0) vs. Mercyhurst Lakers (0-0) – Game summary

Quarter	1	2	3	4	Total
Colonials	-	-	-	-	0
Lakers	-	-	-	-	0

at Saxon Stadium • Erie, PA

- Date: November 15
- Game time: 2:00 p.m. EDT
- TV: NEC Front Row

Statistics	RMU	MERC
First downs		
Total yards		
Rushing yards		
Passing yards		
Passing: Comp–Att–Int		
Time of possession		

Team	Category	Player	Statistics
Robert Morris	Passing		
Robert Morris	Rushing		
Robert Morris	Receiving		
Mercyhurst	Passing		
Mercyhurst	Rushing		
Mercyhurst	Receiving		

=== Duquesne ===
Duquesne Dukes (0-0) vs. Robert Morris Colonials (0-0) – Game summary

Quarter	1	2	3	4	Total
Dukes	-	-	-	-	0
Colonials	-	-	-	-	0

at Joe Walton Stadium • Moon Township, PA

- Date: November 22
- Game time: 2:00 PM EST
- TV: NEC Front Row

Statistics	DUQ	RMU
First downs		
Total yards		
Rushing yards		
Passing yards		
Passing: Comp–Att–Int		
Time of possession		

Team	Category	Player	Statistics
Duquesne	Passing		
Duquesne	Rushing		
Duquesne	Receiving		
Robert Morris	Passing		
Robert Morris	Rushing		
Robert Morris	Receiving		
