= 2025 Duquesne Dukes football team =

College football team

2025 Duquesne Dukes football
- Conference: Northeast Conference
- Record: 7–5 (5–2 NEC)
- Head coach: Jerry Schmitt (21st season)
- Offensive coordinator: Anthony Doria (10th season)
- Defensive coordinator: Mickey Jacobs (2nd season)
- Home stadium: Arthur J. Rooney Athletic Field

2025 Northeast Conference football standings
	Conf.			Overall
Team	W		L	W		L
Central Connecticut $^	6	–	1	8	–	5
Duquesne	5	–	2	7	–	5
Mercyhurst*	4	–	3	5	–	7
LIU	4	–	3	6	–	6
Wagner	4	–	3	5	–	7
Stonehill	3	–	4	4	–	8
Robert Morris	2	–	5	3	–	9
New Haven*	0	–	0	5	–	5
Saint Francis	0	–	7	0	–	11
$ – Conference champion; ^ – FCS playoff participant; * – Ineligible for NEC title and FCS postseason play due to transition from NCAA Division II.; Rankings from STATS Poll

The 2025 Duquesne Dukes football team represented Duquesne University as a member of the Northeast Conference (NEC) during the 2025 NCAA Division I FCS football season. The Dukes were led by 21st-year head coach Jerry Schmitt and played their home games at Rooney Field in Pittsburgh.

== Schedule ==
Date	Time	Opponent	Site	TV	Result	Attendance
August 30	12:00 p.m.	at Pittsburgh*	Acrisure Stadium; Pittsburgh, PA (City Game)	ACCN	L 9–61	53,006
September 6	12:00 p.m.	Lincoln (PA)*	Rooney Field; Pittsburgh, PA	NEC Front Row	W 55–14	1,522
September 13	12:00 p.m.	No. 10 Lehigh*	Rooney Field; Pittsburgh, PA	NEC Front Row	L 21–35	1,703
September 20	6:00 p.m.	at Akron*	InfoCision Stadium; Akron, OH	ESPN+	L 7–51	8,117
September 27	12:00 p.m.	New Haven*	Rooney Field; Pittsburgh, PA	NEC Front Row	W 44–18	1,078
October 4	12:00 p.m.	Stonehill	Rooney Field; Pittsburgh, PA	NEC Front Row	W 34–14	1,068
October 11	1:00 p.m.	Saint Francis^{†}	Rooney Field; Pittsburgh, PA	NEC Front Row	W 52–7	2,965
October 18	6:00 p.m	at Mercyhurst	Saxon Stadium; Erie, PA	NEC Front Row	W 37–0	2,213
October 25	12:00 p.m.	at Wagner	Wagner College Stadium; Staten Island, NY	ESPN+/SportsNet Pittsburgh	L 13–24	2,873
November 8	12:00 p.m.	at LIU	Bethpage Federal Credit Union Stadium; Brookville, NY	NEC Front Row	L 11–29	400
November 15	12:00 p.m.	Central Connecticut	Rooney Field; Pittsburgh, PA	ESPN+	W 38–33	1,150
November 22	2:00 p.m.	at Robert Morris	Joe Walton Stadium; Moon Township, PA	NEC Front Row	W 20–17	2,716
*Non-conference game; ^{†}Homecoming; Rankings from STATS Poll released prior to the game; All times are in Eastern time

== Preseason ==
=== Preseason coaches' poll ===
The Northeast Conference (NEC) released its preseason coaches' poll on August 4, 2025. The Dukes were picked to finish in second place.

== Game summaries ==
=== at Pittsburgh (FBS, City Game) ===
Duquesne Dukes (0–0) at Pittsburgh Panthers (FBS) (0–0) – Game summary

Quarter	1	2	3	4	Total
Dukes	0	6	0	3	9
Panthers (FBS)	14	20	14	13	61

at Acrisure Stadium • Pittsburgh, Pennsylvania

- Date: August 30
- Game time: 12:00 p.m.
- Game weather:
- Game attendance: 53,006
- Referee: Riley Johnson
- TV announcers (ACCN): Clay Matvick, Chase Daniel

Game information

First quarter

- PITT – Desmond Reid 88-yard punt return (Trey Butkowksi kick), 12:14. Panthers 7–0.
- PITT – Cataurus Hicks 4-yard pass from Eli Holstein (Trey Butkowski kick), 2:47. Panthers 14–0. Drive: 11 plays, 62 yards, 4:50.

Second quarter

- DUQ – B.J. Alexander 7-yard pass from Tyler Riddell (Matt Marcinko kick failed), 10:28. Panthers 14–6. Drive: 2 plays, 61 yards, 0:35.
- PITT – Juelz Goff 1-yard run (Trey Butkowski kick BLOCKED), 9:24. Panthers 20–6. Drive: 3 plays, 18 yards, 0:52.
- PITT – Kenny Johnson 20-yard pass from Eli Holstein (Trey Butkowski kick), 4:01. Panthers 27–6. Drive: 3 plays, 47 yards, 1:06.
- PITT – Cataurus Hicks 16-yard pass from Eli Holstein (Trey Butkowski kick), 0:48. Panthers 34–6. Drive: 6 plays, 80 yards, 1:43.

Third quarter

- PITT – Desmond Reid 53-yard run (Trey Butkowski kick), 14:14. Panthers 41–6. Drive: 2 plays, 75 yards, 0:46.
- PITT – Malachi Thomas 34-yard pass from Eli Holstein (Trey Butkowski kick), 3:14. Panthers 48–6. Drive: 8 plays, 75 yards, 3:33.

Fourth quarter

- DUQ – Matt Marcinko 35-yard field goal, 13:56. Panthers 48–9. Drive: 8 plays, 33 yards, 4:18.
- PITT – Trey Butkowski 27-yard field goal, 8:03. Panthers 51–9. Drive: 9 plays, 31 yards, 3:03.
- PITT – Trey Butkowski 27-yard field goal, 3:32. Panthers 54–9. Drive: 7 plays, 12 yards, 2:21.
- PITT – Bryce Yates 60-yard pass from Cole Gonzales (Trey Butkowski kick), 1:12. Panthers 61–9. Drive: 2 plays, 60 yards, 0:38.

Statistics	DUQ	PITT
First downs	8	21
Plays–yards	57–212	65–460
Rushes–yards	30–41	27–158
Passing yards	171	302
Passing: comp–att–int	17–27–0	23–38–1
Turnovers	0	1
Time of possession	35:23	24:37

Team	Category	Player	Statistics
Duquesne	Passing	Tyler Riddell	14/23, 154 yards, TD
Duquesne	Rushing	Taj Butts	10 carries, 38 yards
Duquesne	Receiving	Joey Isabella	8 receptions, 120 yards
Pittsburgh	Passing	Eli Holstein	15/23, 215 yards, 4 TD, INT
Pittsburgh	Rushing	Desmond Reid	8 carries, 66 yards, TD
Pittsburgh	Receiving	Bryce Yates	2 receptions, 69 yards, TD

=== Lincoln (PA) (DII) ===
Lincoln Lions (DII) (0-1) at Duquesne Dukes (0-1) – Game summary

Quarter	1	2	3	4	Total
Lions (DII)	0	7	7	0	14
Dukes	14	27	7	7	55

at Rooney Field • Pittsburgh, PA

- Date: September 6
- Game time: 12:00 PM EDT
- Game weather: Sunny • Temperature: 68 °F (20 °C) • Wind: NE at 8 miles per hour (13 km/h)
- Game attendance: 1,522
- Referee: Michael Davis
- TV announcers (NEC Front Row): Tim Benz (play-by-play) and Ellis Cannon (analyst)

Game information

First Quarter

- (5:13) DUQ – B. J. Alexander 6-yard pass from Tyler Riddell, Matt Marcinko kick (Drive: 10 plays, 67 yards, 5:05; Duquesne 7–0)
- (2:31) DUQ – Shawn Solomon Jr. 24-yard run, Matt Marcinko kick (Drive: 2 plays, 27 yards, 0:41; Duquesne 14–0)

Second Quarter

- (12:42) DUQ – Joey Isabella 7-yard pass from Tyler Riddell, Matt Marcinko kick (Drive: 7 plays, 75 yards, 2:59; Duquesne 21–0)
- (8:08) LINP – Kasi Hazzard 11-yard pass from Hamas Duren, Armando Avril kick (Drive: 6 plays, 42 yards, 2:48; Duquesne 21–7)
- (5:24) DUQ – Ryan Petras 23-yard pass from Tyler Riddell (Drive: 7 plays, 37 yards, 2:34; Duquesne 27–7)
- (2:16) DUQ – Joey Isabella 17-yard pass from Tyler Riddell, Matt Marcinko kick (Drive: 4 plays, 69 yards, 1:54; Duquesne 34–7)
- (0:37) DUQ – Daniel Tarabrella 8-yard pass from Tyler Riddell, Matt Marcinko kick (Drive: 4 plays, 41 yards, 1:10; Duquesne 41–7)

Third Quarter

- (7:40) LINP – Kyrie Tyson 32-yard pass from Hamas Duren, Armando Avril kick (Drive: 11 plays, 72 yards, 5:22; Duquesne 41–14)
- (5:04) DUQ – Ryan Petras 10-yard run, Matt Clark kick (Drive: 1 play, 10 yards, 0:07; Duquesne 48–14)

Fourth Quarter

- (14:56) DUQ – Dazhaun Hopkins 7-yard run, Matt Clark kick (Drive: 8 plays, 84 yards, 4:29; Duquesne 55–14)

Statistics	LINP	DUQ
First downs	13	19
Total yards	221	484
Rushing yards	23	177
Passing yards	198	307
Passing: Comp–Att–Int	21–36–0	22–29–0
Time of possession	28:25	31:35

Team	Category	Player	Statistics
Lincoln (PA)	Passing	Hamas Duren	19/34, 191 yards, 2 TD
Lincoln (PA)	Rushing	Rondarius Gregory	8 carries, 30 yards
Lincoln (PA)	Receiving	Kasi Hazzard	5 receptions, 71 yards, TD
Duquesne	Passing	Tyler Riddell	15/20, 239 yards, 5 TD
Duquesne	Rushing	Dazhaun Hopkins	9 carries, 49 yards, TD
Duquesne	Receiving	Jermaine Johnson	2 receptions, 60 yards

=== No. 10 Lehigh ===
No. 10 Lehigh Mountain Hawks (2-0) at Duquesne Dukes (1-1) – Game summary

Quarter	1	2	3	4	Total
No. 10 Mountain Hawks	0	14	14	7	35
Dukes	0	7	7	7	21

at Rooney Field • Pittsburgh, PA

- Date: September 13
- Game time: 12:00 PM EDT
- Game weather: Sunny • Temperature: 77 °F (25 °C) • Wind: E at 2 miles per hour (3.2 km/h)
- Game attendance: 1,703
- Referee: Travis Barta
- TV announcers (NEC Front Row): Tim Benz (play-by-play) and Ellis Cannon (analyst)

Game information

First Quarter

No scoring plays

Second Quarter

- (LEH): 12:28 - Garrett Guess 13 Yard pass from Hayden Johnson, Nick Garrido kick (Drive: 10 plays, 64 yards, 4:41 LEH 7-0)
- (DUQ): 2:32 - Daniel Tarabrella 8 Yard pass from Tyler Riddell, Matt Marcinko kick (Drive: 9 plays, 80 yards, 4:35 TIED 7-7)
- (LEH): 0:35 - Geoffrey Jamiel 54 Yard pass from Hayden Johnson, Nick Garrido kick (Drive: 1 play, 54 yards, 0:10 LEH 14-7)

Third Quarter

- (LEH): 9:47 - Matt D'Avino 8 Yard pass from Hayden Johnson, Nick Garrido kick (Drive: 8 plays, 63 yards, 4:22 LEH 21-7)
- (DUQ): 7:47 - Joey Isabella 8 Yard pass from Tyler Riddell, Matt Marcinko kick (Drive: 4 plays, 80 yards, 1:55 LEH 21-14)
- (LEH): 4:30 - Jayden Green 27 Yard run, Nick Garrido kick (Drive: 7 plays, 75 yards, 3:17 LEH 28-14)

Fourth Quarter

- (DUQ): 12:37 - Logan Kushner 1 Yard rim, Matt Marcinko kick (Drive: 13 plays, 83 yards, 6:48 LEH 28-21)
- (LEH): 7:29 - Aaron Crossley 1 Yard run, Nick Garrido kick (Drive: 8 plays, 59 yards, 4:59LEH 35-21)

Statistics	LEH	DUQ
First downs	20	16
Total yards	396	318
Rushing yards	172	102
Passing yards	224	216
Passing: Comp–Att–Int	17–25–0	17–28–1
Time of possession	31:46	28:14

Team	Category	Player	Statistics
Lehigh	Passing	Hayden Johnson	17/25, 224 yards, 3 TD
Lehigh	Rushing	Luke Yoder	11 carries, 68 yards
Lehigh	Receiving	Geoffrey Jamiel	7 receptions, 95 yards, TD
Duquesne	Passing	Tyler Riddell	17/28, 216 yards, 2 TD, INT
Duquesne	Rushing	Shawn Solomon Jr.	13 carries, 43 yards
Duquesne	Receiving	Joey Isabella	8 receptions, 153 yards, TD

=== at Akron (FBS) ===
Duquesne Dukes (1–2) at Akron Zips (FBS) (0–3) – Game summary

Quarter	1	2	3	4	Total
Dukes	0	0	7	0	7
Zips (FBS	10	28	7	6	51

at InfoCision Stadium–Summa Field • Akron, Ohio

- Date: September 20
- Game time: 6:00 p.m. EDT
- Game weather: Sunny
- Game attendance: 8,117
- Referee: Billy Williams
- TV announcers (ESPN+): Anthony Lima (play-by-play) and Craig Haubert (analyst)

Game information

First quarter

- AKR – Jordan Gant 17-yard run (Owen Wiley kick), 8:02. Zips 7–0. Drive: 1 play, 17 yards, 0:07.
- AKR – Owen Wiley 27-yard field goal, 0:41. Zips 10–0. Drive: 8 plays, 50 yards, 2:30.

Second quarter

- AKR – Kyan Mason 20-yard pass from Ben Finley (Owen Wiley kick), 12:11. Zips 17–0. Drive: 4 plays, 56 yards, 1:11.
- AKR – Malcolm DeWalt IV 22-yard interception return (Owen Wiley kick), 11:18. Zips 24–0.
- AKR – Jordan Gant 9-yard run (Owen Wiley kick), 8:34. Zips 31–0. Drive: 4 plays, 53 yards, 1:08.
- AKR – Jordan Gant 8-yard run (Owen Wiley kick), 0:24. Zips 38–0. Drive: 7 plays, 60 yards, 1:49.

Third quarter

- AKR – Tim Grear Jr. 15-yard pass from Ben Finley (Matthew Schramm kick), 7:05. Zips 45–0. Drive: 6 plays, 96 yards, 3:03.
- DUQ – Logan Kushner 1-yard run (Matt Marcinko kick), 5:20. Zips 45–7. Drive: 4 plays, 75 yards, 1:45.

Fourth quarter

- AKR – Matthew Schramm 23-yard field goal, 13:13. Zips 48–7. Drive: 9 plays, 33 yards, 3:19.
- AKR – Matthew Schramm 41-yard field goal, 5:07. Zips 51–7. Drive: 10 plays, 47 yards, 5:11.

Statistics	DUQ	AKR
First downs	12	26
Plays–yards	65–230	67–514
Rushes–yards	40–178	35–265
Passing yards	52	249
Passing: Comp–Att–Int	9–25–2	16–32–1
Turnovers	3	1
Time of possession	33:18	26:42

Team	Category	Player	Statistics
Duquesne	Passing	Tyler Riddell	8/21, 52 yards, 2 INT
Duquesne	Rushing	Ness Davis	11 carries, 102 yards
Duquesne	Receiving	Jermaine Johnson	2 receptions, 17 yards
Akron	Passing	Ben Finley	13/23, 219 yards, 2 TD, INT
Akron	Rushing	Jordan Gant	13 carries, 161 yards, 3 TD
Akron	Receiving	Myles Walker	5 receptions, 65 yards

=== New Haven ===
New Haven Chargers (2-2) at Duquesne Dukes (1-3) – Game summary

Quarter	1	2	3	4	Total
Chargers	6	0	6	6	18
Dukes	0	21	14	9	44

at Rooney Field • Pittsburgh, PA

- Date: September 27
- Game time: 12:00 PM EDT
- Game weather: Sunny • Temperature: 70 °F (21 °C) • Wind: W at 3 miles per hour (4.8 km/h)
- Game attendance: 1,078
- Referee: Lance Carlen
- TV announcers (NEC Front Row): Tim Benz (play-by-play) and Ellis Cannon (analyst)

Game information

First Quarter

- (13:23) NH – Joshua Tracey 56-yard pass from AJ Duffy (Drive: 1 play, 56 yards, 0:08; New Haven 6–0)

Second Quarter

- (12:39) DUQ – Joey Isabella 2-yard pass from Tyler Riddell, Matt Marcinko kick (Drive: 10 plays, 95 yards, 5:24; Duquesne 7–6)
- (5:13) DUQ – Joey Isabella 6-yard pass from Tyler Riddell, Matt Marcinko kick (Drive: 10 plays, 60 yards, 6:11; Duquesne 14–6)
- (3:31) DUQ – Joey Isabella 61-yard pass from Tyler Riddell, Matt Marcinko kick (Drive: 2 plays, 61 yards, 0:18; Duquesne 21–6)

Third Quarter

- (6:21) DUQ – Tyler Riddell 10-yard run, Matt Marcinko kick (Drive: 8 plays, 78 yards, 4:00; Duquesne 28–6)
- (6:03) DUQ – Avery Morris 34-yard interception, Matt Marcinko kick (Duquesne 35–6)
- (1:40) NH – Zaon Laney 1-yard run (Drive: 8 plays, 75 yards, 4:23; Duquesne 35–12)

Fourth Quarter

- (11:59) NH – Kevonne Wilder 19-yard pass from AJ Duffy (Drive: 9 plays, 68 yards, 2:56; Duquesne 35–18)
- (11:59) DUQ – DJ Cerisier 100-yard PAT return (Duquesne 37–18)
- (4:51) DUQ – Tyler Riddell 8-yard run, Matt Marcinko kick (Drive: 11 plays, 78 yards, 7:02; Duquesne 44–18)

Statistics	NH	DUQ
First downs	17	22
Total yards	342	499
Rushing yards	149	298
Passing yards	193	201
Passing: Comp–Att–Int	21–32–2	15–23–0
Time of possession	27:05	32:55

Team	Category	Player	Statistics
New Haven	Passing	AJ Duffy	18/29, 184 yards, 2 TD, 2 INT
New Haven	Rushing	Zaon Laney	11 carries, 66 yards, TD
New Haven	Receiving	Kevonne Wilder	8 receptions, 93 yards, TD
Duquesne	Passing	Tyler Riddell	15/23, 201 yards, 3 TD
Duquesne	Rushing	Ness Davis	8 carries, 84 yards
Duquesne	Receiving	Joey Isabella	6 receptions, 92 yards, 3 TD

=== Stonehill ===
Stonehill Skyhawks (2-3) vs. Duquesne Dukes (2-3) – Game summary

Quarter	1	2	3	4	Total
Skyhawks	0	0	0	14	14
Dukes	0	20	7	7	34

at Rooney Field • Pittsburgh, PA

- Date: October 4
- Game time: 12:00 PM EDT
- Game attendance: 1,068
- TV announcers (NEC Front Row): Tim Benz (play-by-play) and Ellis Cannon (analyst)

Statistics	STO	DUQ
First downs		
Total yards		
Rushing yards		
Passing yards		
Passing: Comp–Att–Int		
Time of possession		

Team	Category	Player	Statistics
Stonehill	Passing		
Stonehill	Rushing		
Stonehill	Receiving		
Duquesne	Passing		
Duquesne	Rushing		
Duquesne	Receiving		

=== Saint Francis (PA) ===
Saint Francis Red Flash (0-5) vs. Duquesne Dukes (3-3) – Game summary

Quarter	1	2	3	4	Total
Red Flash	0	0	0	7	7
Dukes	28	17	7	0	52

at Rooney Field • Pittsburgh, PA

- Date: October 11
- Game time: 1:00 PM EDT
- Game attendance: 2,965
- TV announcers (NEC Front Row): Tim Benz (play-by-play) and Ellis Cannon (analyst)

Statistics	SFPA	DUQ
First downs		
Total yards		
Rushing yards		
Passing yards		
Passing: Comp–Att–Int		
Time of possession		

Team	Category	Player	Statistics
Saint Francis (PA)	Passing		
Saint Francis (PA)	Rushing		
Saint Francis (PA)	Receiving		
Duquesne	Passing		
Duquesne	Rushing		
Duquesne	Receiving		

=== at Mercyhurst ===
Duquesne Dukes (4-3) vs. Mercyhurst Lakers (3-4) – Game summary

Quarter	1	2	3	4	Total
Dukes	14	13	0	10	37
Lakers	0	0	0	0	0

at Saxon Stadium • Erie, PA

- Date: October 18
- Game time: 6:00 p.m. EDT
- Game attendance: 2,213
- TV announcers (NEC Front Row): Shawn Bednard (play-by-play) and John Leisering (analyst)

Statistics	DUQ	MERC
First downs		
Total yards		
Rushing yards		
Passing yards		
Passing: Comp–Att–Int		
Time of possession		

Team	Category	Player	Statistics
Duquesne	Passing		
Duquesne	Rushing		
Duquesne	Receiving		
Mercyhurst	Passing		
Mercyhurst	Rushing		
Mercyhurst	Receiving		

=== at Wagner ===
Duquesne Dukes (5-3) vs. Wagner Seahawks (1-6) – Game summary

Quarter	1	2	3	4	Total
Dukes	-	-	-	-	0
Seahawks	-	-	-	-	0

at Wagner College Stadium • New York City, NY

- Date: October 25
- Game time: 12:00 p.m. EDT
- Game attendance: 2,873
- TV announcers (ESPN+/YES): Paul Dottino (play-by-play) and Kevin Gilbride (analyst)

Statistics	DUQ	WAG
First downs		
Total yards		
Rushing yards		
Passing yards		
Passing: Comp–Att–Int		
Time of possession		

Team	Category	Player	Statistics
Duquesne	Passing		
Duquesne	Rushing		
Duquesne	Receiving		
Wagner	Passing		
Wagner	Rushing		
Wagner	Receiving		

=== at LIU ===
Duquesne Dukes (5-4) vs. LIU Sharks (3-6) – Game summary

Quarter	1	2	3	4	Total
Dukes	-	-	-	-	0
Sharks	-	-	-	-	0

at Bethpage Federal Credit Union Stadium • Brookville, NY

- Date: November 8
- Game time: 12:00 p.m. EDT
- Game attendance: 400
- TV: NEC Front Row

Statistics	DUQ	LIU
First downs		
Total yards		
Rushing yards		
Passing yards		
Passing: Comp–Att–Int		
Time of possession		

Team	Category	Player	Statistics
Duquesne	Passing		
Duquesne	Rushing		
Duquesne	Receiving		
LIU	Passing		
LIU	Rushing		
LIU	Receiving		

=== Central Connecticut ===
Central Connecticut Blue Devils (7-3) vs. Duquesne Dukes (5-5) – Game summary

Quarter	1	2	3	4	Total
Blue Devils	7	6	7	13	33
Dukes	12	13	0	13	38

at Rooney Field • Pittsburgh, PA

- Date: November 15
- Game time: 12:00 p.m. EDT
- Game weather: Cloudy • Temperature: 60 °F (16 °C) • Wind: NE at 12 miles per hour (19 km/h)
- Game attendance: 1,150
- Referee: Travis Barta
- TV announcers (ESPN+): Craig D'Amico (play-by-play) and Tim Benz (analyst)

Game information

First Quarter

- (13:21) DUQ - Taj Butts 29 yard run, Matt Clark kick failed, (4 plays, 75 yards, TOP 01:39; 6-0 Duquesne)
- (11:26) CCSU - Elijah Howard 1 yard run, Jack Hennessey kick, (5 plays, 75 yards, TOP 01:55; 7-6 Central Connecticut)
- (01:42) DUQ - Joey Isabella 32 yard pass from Tyler Riddell, Matt Clark kick failed, (7 plays, 95 yards, TOP 04:02; 12-7 Duquesne)

Second Quarter

- (10:15) CCSU - Peter Cleary 25 yard pass from Brady Olson, Jack Hennessey kick failed, (5 plays, 83 yards, TOP 02:23; 13-12 Central Connecticut
- (04:40) DUQ - Taj Butts 57 yd run two point pass conversion failed, (2 plays, 64 yards, TOP 00:53; 18-13 Duquesne
- (01:15) DUQ - Ryan Petras 37 yard pass from Tyler Riddell, Matt Clark kick, (2 plays, 70 yards, TOP 00:33; 25-13 Duquesne

Third Quarter

- (13:28) CCSU - Michael Trovarelli 10 yd pass from Brady Olson, Jack Hennessey kick, (3 plays, 76 yards, TOP 01:25; 25-20 Duquesne)

Fourth Quarter

- (09:21) DUQ - Joey Isabella 4 yd pass from Tyler Riddell, Matt Clark kick, (2 plays, 44 yards, TOP 00:49; 32-20 Duquesne
- (07:07) CCSU - Donovan Wadley 50 yd pass from Brady Olson, Jack Hennessey kick, (5 plays, 65 yards, TOP 02:11; 32-27 Duquesne)
- (04:05) CCSU - Michael Trovarelli 40 yd pass from Brady Olson, two point pass conversion failed, (4 plays, 79 yards, TOP 01:48; 33-32 Central Connecticut)
- (03:19) DUQ - Taj Butts 59 yd run, two point pass conversion failed, (2 plays, 65 yards, TOP 00:46; 38-33 Duquesne)

Statistics	CCSU	DUQ
First downs	24	19
Total yards	588	526
Rushing yards	165	344
Passing yards	423	182
Passing: Comp–Att–Int	28–45–2	14–22–0
Time of possession	30:44	29:16

Team	Category	Player	Statistics
Central Connecticut	Passing	Brady Olson	28/45, 423 yards, 4 TD, 2 INT
Central Connecticut	Rushing	Elijah Howard	22 carries, 108 yards, TD
Central Connecticut	Receiving	Peter Cleary	5 receptions, 111 yards, TD
Duquesne	Passing	Tyler Riddell	14/22, 182 yards, 3 TD
Duquesne	Rushing	Taj Butts	14 carries, 254 yards, 3 TD
Duquesne	Receiving	Ryan Petras	2 receptions, 51 yards, TD

=== at Robert Morris ===
Duquesne Dukes (6-5) vs. Robert Morris Colonials (0-0) – Game summary

Quarter	1	2	3	4	Total
Dukes	-	-	-	-	0
Colonials	-	-	-	-	0

at Joe Walton Stadium • Moon Township, PA

- Date: November 22
- Game time: 2:00 PM EST
- Game attendance: 2,716
- TV: NEC Front Row

Statistics	DUQ	RMU
First downs		
Total yards		
Rushing yards		
Passing yards		
Passing: Comp–Att–Int		
Time of possession		

Team	Category	Player	Statistics
Duquesne	Passing		
Duquesne	Rushing		
Duquesne	Receiving		
Robert Morris	Passing		
Robert Morris	Rushing		
Robert Morris	Receiving		
