= Brookville Reformed Church =

- Brookville Reformed Church
- 40°49′43″N 73°34′14″W
- Address: 2 Brookville Road, Brookville, NY
- Country: United States
- Website: www.brookvillechurch.org

Clergy
- Pastor: Rev. Vicky L. Eastland

The Brookville Reformed Church, located in Brookville, New York, is one of the oldest existing church congregations in the United States. The church was founded by 17th century Dutch settlers.

During September 2006 in the midst of celebrating the church's anniversary, its safe was opened to reveal records from 1732 indicating how the Dutch settled the area and formed the church. Further documents revealed that the Dutch language was spoken and written up to the Civil War years.

In the 1969 film The Out-of-Towners starring Jack Lemmon, a short clip of the church is featured during the opening credits. Dick Van Dyke was also a former member and taught Sunday School.

The Rev. J. Stanley Addis was one of its longest serving Pastors, from 1931 to his retirement in 1966. Rev. Addis was a graduate of the Wharton School and New Brunswick Theological Seminary.
