= 2025 Central Connecticut Blue Devils football team =

American college football season

2025 Central Connecticut Blue Devils football
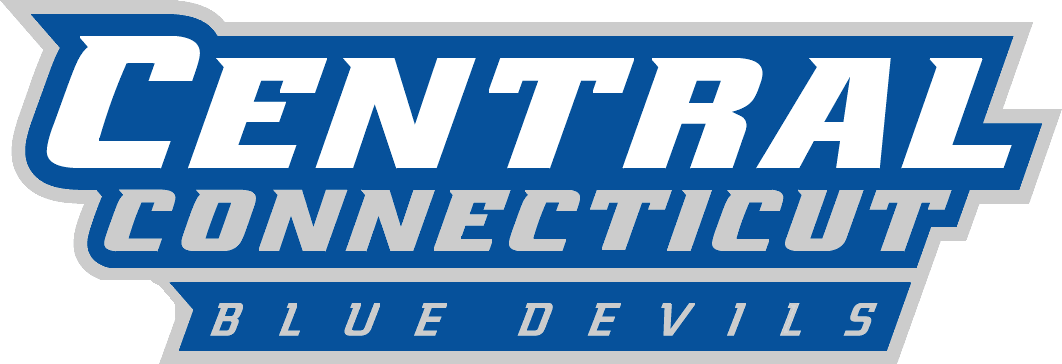

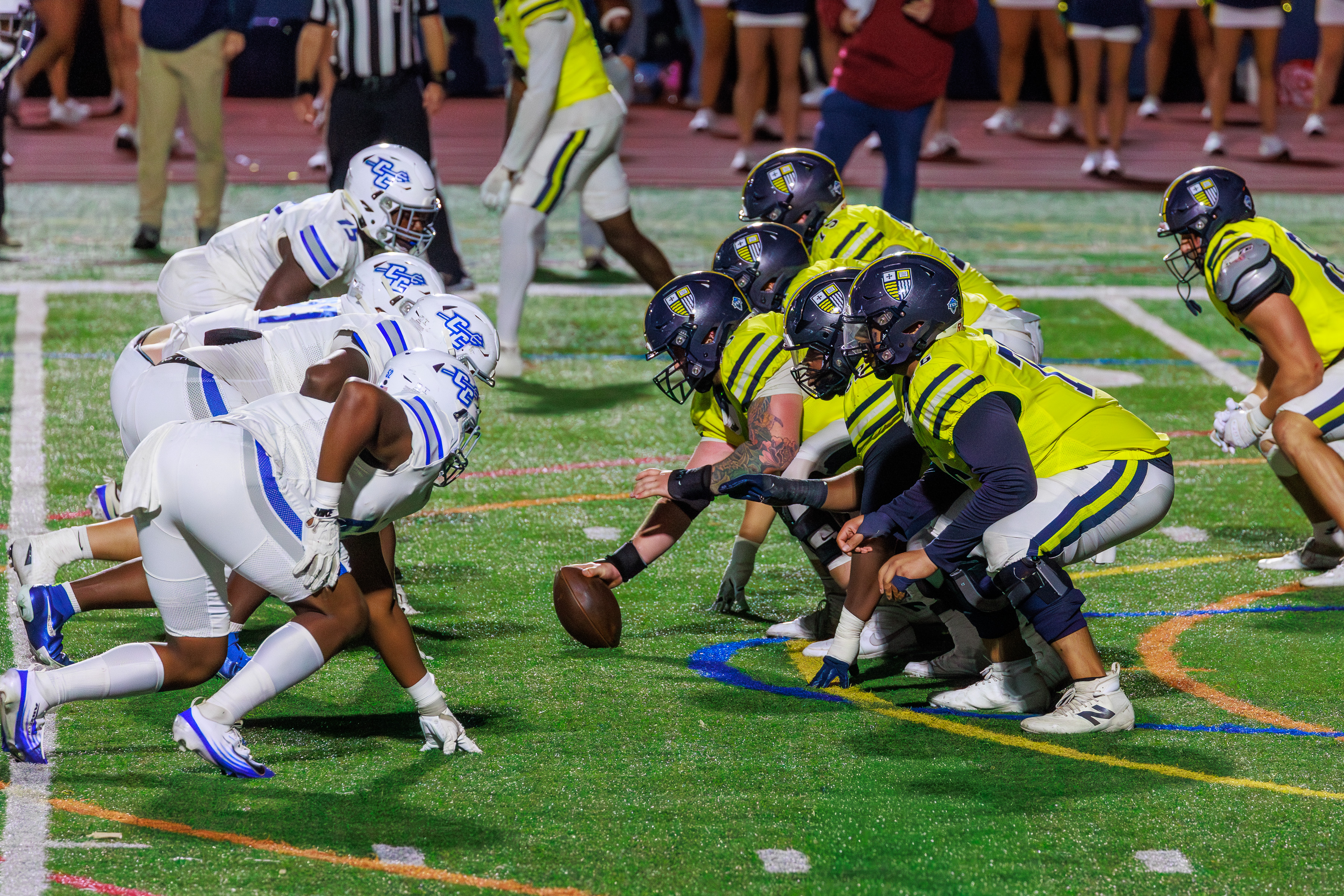
- The Blue Devils lost to the Warriors in a close contest.

NEC champion

NCAA Division I First Round, L 19–27 vs. Rhode Island
- Conference: Northeast Conference
- Record: 8–5 (6–1 NEC)
- Head coach: Adam Lechtenberg (3rd season)
- Offensive coordinator: Caleb Gelsomino (3rd season)
- Defensive coordinator: Ron DiGravio (7th season)
- Home stadium: Arute Field

2025 Northeast Conference football standings
	Conf.			Overall
Team	W		L	W		L
Central Connecticut $^	6	–	1	8	–	5
Duquesne	5	–	2	7	–	5
Mercyhurst*	4	–	3	5	–	7
LIU	4	–	3	6	–	6
Wagner	4	–	3	5	–	7
Stonehill	3	–	4	4	–	8
Robert Morris	2	–	5	3	–	9
New Haven*	0	–	0	5	–	5
Saint Francis	0	–	7	0	–	11
$ – Conference champion; ^ – FCS playoff participant; * – Ineligible for NEC title and FCS postseason play due to transition from NCAA Division II.; Rankings from STATS Poll

The 2025 Central Connecticut Blue Devils football team represented the Central Connecticut State University (CCSU) as a member of the Northeast Conference during the 2025 NCAA Division I FCS football season. The Blue Devils were led by Adam Lechtenberg in his third year as the head coach.

== Preseason ==
=== Preseason coaches' poll ===
The NEC released their preseason coaches' poll on August 4, 2025. The Blue Devils were picked to finish in first place.

== Schedule ==
Date	Time	Opponent	Site	TV	Result	Attendance
August 30	2:00 p.m.	at UConn*	Pratt & Whitney Stadium at Rentschler Field; East Hartford, CT	WFSB	L 13–59	37,594
September 6	12:00 p.m.	American International*	Arute Field; New Britain, CT	NEC Front Row	W 34–7	3,122
September 13	12:00 p.m.	Saint Francis	Arute Field; New Britain, CT	NEC Front Row	W 31–7	2,211
September 20	6:00 p.m.	at Merrimack*	Duane Stadium; North Andover, MA	ESPN+/NESN+	L 14–16	4,129
September 27	12:00 p.m.	Dartmouth*^{†}	Arute Field; New Britain, CT	NEC Front Row	L 28–35	4,019
October 4	12:00 p.m.	Sacred Heart*	Arute Field; New Britain, CT	NEC Front Row	W 42–35 ^{OT}	2,044
October 11	2:00 p.m.	at Robert Morris	Joe Walton Stadium; Moon Township, PA	NEC Front Row	W 24–12	2,789
October 18	5:00 p.m.	at Wagner	Wagner College Stadium; Staten Island, NY	NEC Front Row	W 24–17 ^{OT}	2,468
November 1	12:00 p.m.	LIU	Arute Field; New Britain, CT	NEC Front Row	W 10–7	2,323
November 8	12:00 p.m.	Stonehill	Arute Field; New Britain, CT	ESPN+/YES	W 40–10	
November 15	12:00 p.m.	at Duquesne	Arthur J. Rooney Athletic Field; Pittsburgh, PA	ESPN+	L 33–38	1,150
November 22	12:00 p.m.	Mercyhurst	Arute Field; New Britain, CT	NEC Front Row	W 35–28	2,015
November 29	12:00 p.m.	at No. 8 Rhode Island*	Meade Stadium; Kingston, RI (NCAA Division I First Round)	ESPN+	L 19–27	2,680
*Non-conference game; ^{†}Homecoming; Rankings from STATS Poll released prior to the game; All times are in Eastern time; Source:

== Game summaries ==
=== at UConn (FBS) ===
Central Connecticut Blue Devils (0–0) at UConn Huskies (FBS) (0–0) – Game summary

Quarter	1	2	3	4	Total
Blue Devils	7	3	3	0	13
Huskies (FBS)	14	21	10	14	59

at Pratt & Whitney Stadium at Rentschler Field • East Hartford, CT

- Date: August 30
- Game time: 2:00 PM EDT
- Game weather: Sunny • Temperature: 73 °F (23 °C) • Wind: NW at 8 miles per hour (13 km/h)
- Game attendance: 37,594
- Referee: Jerry Magallanes
- TV announcers (WWAX/UConn+): Randy Brochu (play-by-play), Marc Robbins (analyst), Joe Zone (sideline)
- Box Score

Game information

First quarter

- CCSU - Elijah Howard 2-yard run (Jack Hennessey kick), 12:54. Blue Devils 7–0. Drive: 2 plays, 5 yards, 00:43.
- CONN - Skyler Bell 80-yard pass from Joe Fagnano (Chris Freeman kick), 10:15. TIED 7–7. Drive: 6 plays, 88 yards, 02:30.
- CONN - Skyler Bell 12-yard pass from Joe Fagnano (Chris Freeman kick), 1:05. Huskies 14–7. Drive: 10 plays, 92 yards, 04:04.

Second quarter

- CONN - Cam Edwards 73-yard run (Chris Freeman kick), 11:24. Huskies 21–7. Drive: 1 plays, 73 yards, 00:13.
- CONN - Joe Fagnano 4-yard run (Chris Freeman kick), 8:21. Huskies 28–7. Drive: 5 plays, 50 yards, 02:20.
- CCSU - Jack Hennessey 20-yard field goal, 3:20. Huskies 28–10. Drive: 10 plays, 72 yards, 05:01.
- CONN - Reymello Murphy 3-yard pass from Joe Fagnano (Chris Freeman kick), 0:34. Huskies 35–10. Drive: 7 plays, 52 yards, 00:54.

Third quarter

- CONN - Victor Rosa 20-yard run (Chris Freeman kick), 12:33. Huskies 42–10. Drive: 4 plays, 60 yards, 01:39.
- CCSU - Jack Hennessey 29-yard field goal, 7:02. Huskies 42–13. Drive: 12 plays, 63 yards, 05:31.
- CONN - Chris Freeman 29-yard field goal, 3:43. Huskies 45–13. Drive: 8 plays, 62 yards, 03:15.

Fourth quarter

- CONN - Jackson Harper 19-yard pass from Nick Evers (Chris Freeman kick), 13:02. Huskies 52–13. Drive: 9 plays, 55 yards, 03:54.
- CONN - MJ Flowers 16-yard run (Chris Freeman kick), 2:38. Huskies 59–13. Drive: 10 plays, 80 yards, 03:21.

Statistics	CCSU	CONN
First downs	13	26
Plays–yards	63–257	71–638
Rushes–yards	40–128	33–250
Passing yards	129	388
Passing: Comp–Att–Int	9–23–0	27–38–0
Turnovers	0	0
Time of possession	32:32	27:28

Team	Category	Player	Statistics
Central Connecticut	Passing	Brady Olson	8/19, 118 yards
Central Connecticut	Rushing	Elijah Howard	11 carries, 59 yards, TD
Central Connecticut	Receiving	Dave Pardo	2 receptions, 64 yards
UConn	Passing	Joe Fagnano	18/25, 260 yards, 3 TD
UConn	Rushing	Cam Edwards	6 carries, 115 yards, TD
UConn	Receiving	Skyler Bell	4 receptions, 135 yards, 2 TD

=== American International (DII) ===
American International Yellow Jackets (DII) (0-0) vs. Central Connecticut Blue Devils (0-1) – Game summary

Quarter	1	2	3	4	Total
Yellow Jackets (DII)	0	7	0	0	7
Blue Devils	3	14	7	10	34

at Arute Field • New Britain, CT

- Date: September 6
- Game time: 12:00 p.m. EDT
- Game weather: Sunny • Temperature: 74 °F (23 °C) • Wind: NE at 9 miles per hour (14 km/h)
- Game attendance: 3,122
- Referee: Lance Carlen
- TV announcers (NEC Front Row): Bruce Biel (play-by-play) and Marc Robbins (analyst)

Game information

First Quarter

- (4:32) CCSU – Jack Hennessey 33-yard field goal (Drive: 14 plays, 41 yards, 6:32; Central Connecticut 3–0)

Second Quarter

- (10:28) AIU – Tra'Vion Singleton 0-yard fumble recovery, Santana Fonseca kick (American International 7–3)
- (8:07) CCSU – Davon Smith Jr. 5-yard run, Jack Hennessey kick (Drive: 5 plays, 76 yards, 2:11; Central Connecticut 10–7)
- (6:07) CCSU – Donny Marcus 54-yard pass from Brady Olson, Jack Hennessey kick (Drive: 1 play, 54 yards, 0:10; Central Connecticut 17–7)

Third Quarter

- (8:41) CCSU – Donny Marcus 1-yard run, Jack Hennessey kick (Drive: 3 plays, 20 yards, 0:48; Central Connecticut 24–7)

Fourth Quarter

- (13:52) CCSU – Michael Trovarelli 1-yard pass from Brady Olson, Jack Hennessey kick (Drive: 4 plays, 71 yards, 1:19; Central Connecticut 31–7)
- (4:49) CCSU – Jack Hennessey 26-yard field goal (Drive: 11 plays, 50 yards, 5:07; Central Connecticut 34–7)

Statistics	AIC	CCSU
First downs	10	16
Total yards	200	375
Rushing yards	79	128
Passing yards	121	247
Passing: Comp–Att–Int	12–20–0	15–21–0
Time of possession	33:46	26:14

Team	Category	Player	Statistics
American International	Passing	Cephas Williams	7/9, 85 yards
American International	Rushing	Bo Catherwood	12 carries, 48 yards
American International	Receiving	Brian Lafrance	2 receptions, 23 yards
Central Connecticut	Passing	Brady Olson	15/21, 247 yards, 2 TD
Central Connecticut	Rushing	Donny Marcus	11 carries, 34 yards, TD
Central Connecticut	Receiving	Paul Marsh Jr.	3 receptions, 67 yards

=== Saint Francis ===
Saint Francis Red Flash (0-2) vs. Central Connecticut Blue Devils (1-1) – Game summary

Quarter	1	2	3	4	Total
Red Flash	7	0	0	0	7
Blue Devils	7	0	14	10	31

at Arute Field • New Britain, CT

- Date: September 13
- Game time: 12:00 p.m. EDT
- Game weather: Sunny • Temperature: 71 °F (22 °C) • Wind: SW at 5 miles per hour (8.0 km/h)
- Game attendance: 2.211
- Referee: Jonathan Grande
- TV announcers (NEC Front Row): Bruce Biel (play-by-play) and Marc Robbins (analyst)

Game information

First Quarter

- (11:44) CCSU - Elijah Howard 1 yd pass from Brady Olson, Jack Hennessey kick, (4 plays, 7 yards, TOP 01:51; 7-0 Central Connecticut)
- (00:00) SFU - Jahmil Perryman 8 yd run, Mac Plummer kick, (3 plays, 98 yards, TOP 01:19 7-7 Tied)

Second Quarter

- no scoring

Third Quarter

- (07:17) CCSU - Donny Marcus 1 yd run, Jack Hennessey kick, (6 plays, 35 yards, TOP 02:50; 14-7 Central Connecticut)
- (2:44) CCSU - Elijah Howard 8 yd pass from Brady Olson, Jack Hennessey kick, (4 plays, 61 yards, TOP 02:00; 21-7 Central Connecticut)

Fourth Quarter

- (12:13) CCSU - Jack Hennessey 35 yd field goal, (9 plays, 47 yards, TOP 03:38; 24-7 Central Connecticut)
- (09:55) CCSU - Donny Marcus 6 yd run, Jack Hennessey kick, (3 plays, 23 yards, TOP 01:00; 31-7 Central Connecticut)

Statistics	SFU	CCSU
First downs	11	19
Total yards	210	300
Rushing yards	51	107
Passing yards	159	193
Passing: Comp–Att–Int	13-26-2	16-33-0
Time of possession	28:36	31:07

Team	Category	Player	Statistics
Saint Francis	Passing	Nick Whitfield Jr.	13/26, 159 yards 2 INT
Saint Francis	Rushing	Raphael Ekechi	7 carries, 35 yards
Saint Francis	Receiving	Lukas Gilland	1 reception, 71 yards
Central Connecticut	Passing	Brady Olson	16/33, 193 yards, 2 TD
Central Connecticut	Rushing	Donny Marcus	12 carries, 51 yards, 2 TD
Central Connecticut	Receiving	Donovan Wadley	2 receptions, 72 yards

=== at Merrimack ===
Central Connecticut Blue Devils (2-1) vs. Merrimack Warriors (1-2) – Game summary

Quarter	1	2	3	4	Total
Blue Devils	0	0	0	14	14
Warriors	0	10	3	3	16

at Duane Stadium • North Andover, MA

- Date: September 20
- Game time: 6:00 p.m. EDT
- Game weather: Sunny
- Game attendance: 4,129
- Referee: John Smith
- TV announcers (ESPN+/NESN+): John Avino (play-by-play), Jacob Vanryn (analyst) and Isaiah Voegeli (sideline)

Game information

First Quarter

- no scoring

Second Quarter

- (14:02) MC - Ayden Pereira 5 yd run, Carlton Thai kick, (1 plays, 5 yards, TOP 00:05; 7-0 Merrimack)
- (09:07) MC - Carlton Thai 28 yd field goal, (7 plays, 15 yards, TOP 04:08; 10-0 Merrimack)

Third Quarter

- (07:43) MC - Carlton Thai 38 yd field goal, (6 plays, 7 yards, TOP 02:20; 13-0 Merrimack)

Fourth Quarter

- (09:23) CCSU - Elijah Howard 21 yd run, Jack Hennessey kick, (4 plays, 61 yards, TOP 01:47; 13-7 Merrimack)
- (01:32) CCSU - Elijah Howard 1 yd run, Jack Hennessey kick, (7 plays, 40 yards, TOP 01:53; 14-13 Central Connecticut)
- (00:01) MC - Carlton Thai 19 yd field goal, (7 plays, 66 yards, TOP 01:24; 16-14 Merrimack)

Statistics	CCSU	MRMK
First downs	17	20
Total yards	262	314
Rushing yards	88	190
Passing yards	174	124
Passing: Comp–Att–Int	14–32–1	12–30–2
Time of possession	23:41	36:19

Team	Category	Player	Statistics
Central Connecticut	Passing	Brady Olson	14/32, 174 yards, 1 INT
Central Connecticut	Rushing	Elijah Howard	16 carries, 91 yards, 2 TD
Central Connecticut	Receiving	Dave Pardo	2 receptions, 63 yards
Merrimack	Passing	Ayden Pereira	12/29, 124 yards, 2 INT
Merrimack	Rushing	Ayden Pereira	13 carries, 71 yards, TD
Merrimack	Receiving	Keshawn Brown	4 receptions, 50 yards

=== Dartmouth ===
Dartmouth Big Green (1-0) vs. Central Connecticut Blue Devils (2-2) – Game summary

Quarter	1	2	3	4	Total
Big Green	7	13	0	15	35
Blue Devils	14	0	0	14	28

at Arute Field • New Britain, CT

- Date: September 27
- Game time: 12:00 p.m. EDT
- Game weather: Sunny • Temperature: 74 °F (23 °C) • Wind: N at 2 miles per hour (3.2 km/h)
- Game attendance: 4,019
- Referee: Michael Davis
- TV announcers (NEC Front Row): Bruce Biel (play-by-play) and Marc Robbins (analyst)

Game information

First Quarter

- CCSU - Dave Pardo 6-yard pass from Brady Olson (Jack Hennessey kick), 7:30. Blue Devils 7-0. Drive: 6 plays, 38 yards, 2:15.
- DART - D.J. Crowther 2-yard run (Owen Zalc kick), 5:38. Tied 7-7. Drive: 4 plays, 75 yards, 1:52.
- CCSU - Paul Marsh Jr. 12-yard pass from Brady Olson (Jack Hennessey kick), 1:23. Blue Devils 14-7. Drive: 9 plays 68 yards, 4:09.

Second Quarter

- DART - D.J. Crowther 12-yard run (Owen Zalc kick), 9:24. Tied 14-14. Drive: 6 plays 53 yards, 2:19.
- DART - Owen Zalc 36-yard Field Goal, 6:24. Big Green 17-14. Drive: 7 plays, 17 yards, 2:14.
- DART - Owen Zalc 27-yard Field Goal, 0:00. Big Green 20-14. Drive: 15 plays, 76 yards, 2:54.

Third Quarter

No scoring plays

Fourth Quarter

- CCSU - Elijah Howard 9-yard run (Jack Hennessey kick), 14:52. Blue Devils 21-20. Drive: 11 plays. 80 yards, 4:13.
- DART - Chris Corbo 26-yard pass from Grayson Saunier (Grayson Saunier run for Two-Point Conversion), 5:56. Big Green 28-21. Drive: 9 plays, 89 yards, 3:42.
- CCSU - Michael Trovarelli 5-yard pass from Brady Olson (Jack Hennessey kick), 0:58. Tied 28-28. Drive: 12 plays, 80 yards, 4:57.
- DART - Ky'Dric Fisher 50-yard pass from Grayson Saunier (Owen Zalc kick), 0:16. Big Green 35-28. Drive: 5 plays, 75 yards, 0:42.

Statistics	DART	CCSU
First downs	31	23
Total yards	524	289
Rushing yards	117	66
Passing yards	407	223
Passing: Comp–Att–Int	30–44–1	25–33–0
Time of possession	32:29	27:31

Team	Category	Player	Statistics
Dartmouth	Passing	Grayson Saunier	30/44, 407 yards, 2 TD, INT
Dartmouth	Rushing	D.J. Crowther	24 carries, 86 yards, 2 TD
Dartmouth	Receiving	Grayson O'Bara	7 receptions, 128 yards
Central Connecticut	Passing	Brady Olson	25/33, 223 yards, 3 TD
Central Connecticut	Rushing	Elijah Howard	14 carries, 69 yards, TD
Central Connecticut	Receiving	Dave Pardo	6 receptions, 42 yards, TD

=== Sacred Heart ===
Sacred Heart Pioneers (4-1) vs. Central Connecticut Blue Devils (2-3) – Game summary

Quarter	1	2	3	4	OT	Total
Pioneers	0	14	7	14	0	35
Blue Devils	7	13	0	15	7	42

at Arute Field • New Britain, CT

- Date: October 4
- Game time: 12:00 p.m. EDT
- Game weather: Sunny
- Game attendance: 2,044
- Referee: Travis Barta
- TV announcers (NEC Front Row): Bruce Biel (play-by-play) and Marc Robbins (analyst)

Game information

First Quarter

- (04:36) CCSU - David Pardo 7 yd pass from Brady Olson, Jack Hennessey kick, (8 plays, 78 yards, TOP 03:43; 7-0 Central Connecticut)

Second Quarter

- (14:50) CCSU - Jack Hennessey 26 yd field goal, (10 plays, 57 yards, TOP 03:44; 10-0 Central Connecticut)
- (06:47) CCSU - Jack Hennessey 22 yd field goal, (14 plays, 87 yards, TOP 06:35; 13-0 Central Connecticut)
- (04:05) SHU - John Michalski 1 yd run, Matt Kling kick, (6 plays, 75 yards, TOP 02:42; 13-7 Central Connecticut)
- (01:16) CCSU - Michael Trovarelli 29 yd pass from Brady Olson, Jack Hennessey kick, (10 plays, 90 yards, TOP 02:41; 20-7 Central Connecticut)
- (00:10) SHU - Payton Rhoades 22 yd pass from Jack Snyder, Matt Kling kick, (9 plays, 75 yards, TOP 01:06; 20-14 Central Connecticut)

Third Quarter

- (03:54) SHU - Trey Eberhart 9 yd run, Matt Kling kick, (10 plays, 60 yards, TOP 05:20; 21-20 Sacred Heart)

Fourth Quarter

- (08:33) CCSU - Donny Marcus 32 yd pass from Brady Olson, David Pardo pass, (7 plays, 72 yards, TOP 02:58; 28-21 Central Connecticut)
- (06:04) SHU - Jack Snyder 15 yd run, Matt Kling kick, (5 plays, 65 yards, TOP 02:29; 28-28 Tied)
- (02:54) CCSU - Brady Olson 9 yd run, Jack Hennessey kick, (8 plays, 75 yards, TOP 03:10; 35-28 Central Connecticut)
- (00:59) SHU - Jason Palmieri 37 yd pass from Jack Snyder, Matt Kling kick, (7 plays, 76 yards, TOP 01:48; 35-35 Tied)

Overtime

- (00:00) CCSU - Elijah Howard 25 yd pass from Brady Olson, Jack Hennessey kick, (1 plays, 25 yards; 42-35 Central Connecticut)

Statistics	SHU	CCSU
First downs	22	25
Total yards	437	509
Rushing yards	219	186
Passing yards	218	323
Passing: Comp–Att–Int	17–28–0	28–40–0
Time of possession	25:37	34:23

Team	Category	Player	Statistics
Sacred Heart	Passing	Jack Snyder	17/27, 218 yard, 2 TD
Sacred Heart	Rushing	Trey Eberhart III	14 carries, 83 yards, 1 TD
Sacred Heart	Receiving	Jason Palmieri	3 receptions, 65 yards, 1 TD
Central Connecticut	Passing	Brady Olson	28/40, 323 yards, 4 TD
Central Connecticut	Rushing	Elijah Howard	18 carries, 102 yards
Central Connecticut	Receiving	Elijah Howard	5 receptions, 69 yards, 1 TD

=== at Robert Morris ===
Central Connecticut Blue Devils (3-3) vs. Robert Morris Colonials (1-4) – Game summary

Quarter	1	2	3	4	Total
Blue Devils	14	0	7	3	24
Colonials	0	0	0	12	12

at Joe Walton Stadium • Moon Township, PA

- Date: October 11
- Game time: 2:00 p.m. EDT
- Game weather: Sunny • Temperature: 66 °F (19 °C) • Wind: NW at 1 mile per hour (1.6 km/h)
- Game attendance: 2,789
- Referee: Jonathan Grande
- TV announcers (NEC Front Row): Chris Shovlin (play-by-play) and Ray Thomas (analyst)

Game information

First Quarter

- (5:07) CCSU – Donovan Wadley 34-yard pass from Brady Olsen, Jack Hennessey kick (Drive: 7 plays, 57 yards, 3:13; Central Connecticut 7–0)
- (0:54) CCSU – Elijah Howard 29-yard run, Jack Hennessey kick (Drive: 5 plays, 57 yards, 2:30; Central Connecticut 14–0)

Second Quarter

No scoring plays

Third Quarter

- (13:33) CCSU – Devon Anderson 55-yard interception, Jack Hennessey kick (Central Connecticut 21–0)

Fourth Quarter

- (10:48) RMU – Chaz Middleton 6-yard pass from Jake Wolfe (Drive: 7 plays, 46 yards, 2:30; Central Connecticut 21–6)
- (8:54) RMU – Donta Whack 7-yard run (Drive: 4 plays, 53 yards, 1:52; Central Connecticut 21–12)
- (4:24) CCSU – Jack Hennessey 35-yard field goal (Drive: 9 plays, 45 yards, 4:12; Central Connecticut 24–12)

Statistics	CCSU	RMU
First downs	22	19
Total yards	350	431
Rushing yards	163	75
Passing yards	187	356
Passing: Comp–Att–Int	19–34–0	25–42–2
Time of possession	27:37	32:23

Team	Category	Player	Statistics
Central Connecticut	Passing	Brady Olson	19/34, 187 yards, TD
Central Connecticut	Rushing	Elijah Howard	16 carries, 131 yards, TD
Central Connecticut	Receiving	Michael Trovarelli	3 receptions, 41 yards
Robert Morris	Passing	Cooper Panteck	16/30, 223 yards, 2 INT
Robert Morris	Rushing	Donta Whack	12 carries, 40 yards, TD
Robert Morris	Receiving	Chaz Middleton	9 receptions, 186 yards, TD

=== at Wagner ===
Central Connecticut Blue Devils (4-3) vs. Wagner Seahawks (1-5) – Game summary

Quarter	1	2	3	4	OT	Total
Blue Devils	0	10	7	0	7	24
Seahawks	14	0	3	0	0	17

at Wagner College Stadium • New York City, NY

- Date: October 18
- Game weather: Sunny • Temperature: 67 °F (19 °C)
- Game attendance: 2,467
- Referee: Michael Davis
- TV announcers (NEC Front Row): Marc Earney (play-by-play) and Ray Martel (analyst)

Game information

First Quarter

- (06:48) WAG - Jeremiah Colclough 11 yd pass from Jordan Barton, Nicholas Romero kick, (12 plays, 77 yards, TOP 04:56; 7-0 Wagner)
- (01:020 WAG - Jordan Johnson 92 yd fumble recovery, Nicholas Romero kick, (14-0 Wagner)

Second Quarter

- (12:52) CCSU - Jack Hennessey 22 yd field goal, (8 plays, 48 yards, TOP 03:05; 14-3 Wagner)
- (04:45) CCSU - Elijah Howard 5 yd run, Jack Hennessey kick, (12 plays, 76 yards, TOP 06:25; 14-10 Wagner)

Third Quarter

- (11:51) CCSU - Paul Marsh Jr. 28 yd pass from Brady Olson, Jack Hennessey kick, (5 plays, 49 yards, TOP 01:36; 17-14 Central Connecticut)
- (08:55) WAG - Nicholas Romero 38 yd field goal, (6 plays, 64 yards, TOP 02:51; 17-17 Tied)

Fourth Quarter

- no scoring

Overtime

- (00:00) CCSU - Brady Olson 11 yd run, Jack Hennessey kick, (2 plays, 25 yards, TOP 00:00; 24-17 Central Connecticut)

Statistics	CCSU	WAG
First downs	25	13
Total yards	378	246
Rushing yards	127	48
Passing yards	251	198
Passing: Comp–Att–Int	25-45-2	20-35-1
Time of possession	33:03	25:09

Team	Category	Player	Statistics
Central Connecticut	Passing	Brady Olson	25/45, 251 yards, 1 TD, 2 INT
Central Connecticut	Rushing	Elijah Howard	20 carries, 90 yards, 1 TD
Central Connecticut	Receiving	Donovan Wadley	2 receptions, 58 yards
Wagner	Passing	Jordan Barton	20/35, 198 yards, 1 TD, 1 INT
Wagner	Rushing	Andre Hines	11 carries, 46 yards
Wagner	Receiving	Malik Cooper	2 receptions, 65 yards

=== LIU ===
LIU Sharks (3-5) vs. Central Connecticut Blue Devils (5-3) – Game summary

Quarter	1	2	3	4	Total
Sharks	0	0	7	0	7
Blue Devils	0	3	7	0	10

at Arute Field • New Britain, CT

- Date: November 1
- Game time: 12:00 p.m. EDT
- Game weather: Sunny • Temperature: 54 °F (12 °C)
- Game attendance: 2,323
- Referee: Jonathan Grande
- TV announcers (NEC Front Row): Bruce Biel (play-by-play) and Marc Robbins (analyst)

Game information

First Quarter

- no scoring

Second Quarter

- (01:55) CCSU - Jack Hennessey 33 yd field goal, (15 plays, 56 yards, TOP 07:30; 3-0 Central Connecticut)

Third Quarter

- (01:40) LIU - O'Shawn Ross 3 yd pass from Luca Stanzani, Will Johnson kick, (16 plays, 77 yards, TOP 07:37; 7-3 Long Island)
- (00:53) CCSU - Donovan Wadley 51 yd pass from Brady Olson, Jack Hennessey kick, (2 plays, 69 yards, TOP 00:41; 10-7 Central Connecticut)

Fourth Quarter

- no scoring

Statistics	LIU	CCSU
First downs	19	16
Total yards	236	317
Rushing yards	109	117
Passing yards	127	200
Passing: Comp–Att–Int	22-36-0	16-29-1
Time of possession	30:17	29:43

Team	Category	Player	Statistics
LIU	Passing	Luca Stanzani	21/33, 127 yards, 1 TD
LIU	Rushing	O'Shawn Ross	19 carries, 58 yards
LIU	Receiving	Jayden Simpson	5 receptions, 47 yards
Central Connecticut	Passing	Brady Olson	16/29, 200 yards, 1 TD 1 INT
Central Connecticut	Rushing	Elijah Howard	17 carries, 57 yards
Central Connecticut	Receiving	Donovan Wadley	2 receptions, 60 yards, 1 TD

=== Stonehill ===
Stonehill Skyhawks (3-6) vs. Central Connecticut Blue Devils (6-3) – Game summary

Quarter	1	2	3	4	Total
Skyhawks	0	7	3	0	10
Blue Devils	17	9	7	7	40

at Arute Field • New Britain, CT

- Date: November 8
- Game time: 12:00 p.m. EDT
- Game weather: Sunny • Temperature: 61 °F (16 °C) • Wind: NW at 10 miles per hour (16 km/h)
- Referee: Michael Davis
- TV: ESPN+/YES

Game information

First Quarter

- (08:49) CCSU - Elijah Howard 3 yd run, Jack Hennessey kick, (12 plays, 78 yards, TOP 06:05; 7-0 Central Connecticut)
- (04:23) CCSU - Donny Marcus 11 yd run, Jack Hennessey kick, (7 plays, 66 yards, TOP 02:40; 14-0 Central Connecticut)
- (00:49) CCSU - Jack Hennessey 30 yd field goal, (6 plays, 48 yards, TOP 02:20; 17-0 Central Connecticut)

Second Quarter

- (11:40) CCSU - Elijah Howard 93 yd run, Jack Hennessey kick failed, (2 plays, 87 yards, TOP 01:14; 23-0 Central Connecticut)
- (02:49) STO - Cole Clarke 12 yd pass from Jack O'Connell, Domenic Scalese kick, (6 plays, 47 yards, TOP 02:57; 23-7 Central Connecticut)
- (00:00) CCSU - Jack Hennessey 20 yd field goal, (13 plays, 46 yards, TOP 02:38; 26-7 Central Connecticut)

Third Quarter

- (08:48) STO - Domenic Scalese 28 yd field goal, (12 plays, 64 yards, TOP 06:12; 26-10 Central Connecticut)
- (05:30) CCSU - Sean O'Brien 12 yd pass from Brady Olson, Jack Hennessey kick, (8 plays, 65 yards, TOP 03:10; 33-10 Central Connecticut)

Fourth Quarter

- (10:06) CCSU - Ricky Ortega 12 yd pass from Brady Olson, Jack Hennessey kick, (8 plays, 73 yards, TOP 04:41; 40-10 Central Connecticut)

Statistics	STO	CCSU
First downs	15	28
Total yards	220	533
Rushing yards	60	266
Passing yards	160	267
Passing: Comp–Att–Int	16-27-0	21-32-0
Time of possession	30:37	29:23

Team	Category	Player	Statistics
Stonehill	Passing	Jack O'Connell	16/27, 160 yards, 1 TD
Stonehill	Rushing	Aidan Garrett	12 carries, 75 yards
Stonehill	Receiving	Myles Wilson	5 receptions, 39 yards
Central Connecticut	Passing	Brady Olson	20/30, 261 yards, 2 TD
Central Connecticut	Rushing	Elijah Howard	17 carries, 178 yards, 2 TD
Central Connecticut	Receiving	Joe Crifasi	4 receptions, 52 yards

=== at Duquesne ===
Central Connecticut Blue Devils (7-3) vs. Duquesne Dukes (6-5) – Game summary

Quarter	1	2	3	4	Total
Blue Devils	7	6	7	13	33
Dukes	12	13	0	13	38

at Rooney Field • Pittsburgh, PA

- Date: November 15
- Game time: 12:00 p.m. EDT
- Game weather: Cloudy • Temperature: 60 °F (16 °C) • Wind: NE at 12 miles per hour (19 km/h)
- Game attendance: 1,150
- Referee: Travis Barta
- TV announcers (ESPN+): Craig D'Amico (play-by-play) and Tim Benz (analyst)

Game information

First Quarter

- (13:21) DUQ - Taj Butts 29 yard run, Matt Clark kick failed, (4 plays, 75 yards, TOP 01:39; 6-0 Duquesne)
- (11:26) CCSU - Elijah Howard 1 yard run, Jack Hennessey kick, (5 plays, 75 yards, TOP 01:55; 7-6 Central Connecticut)
- (01:42) DUQ - Joey Isabella 32 yard pass from Tyler Riddell, Matt Clark kick failed, (7 plays, 95 yards, TOP 04:02; 12-7 Duquesne)

Second Quarter

- (10:15) CCSU - Peter Cleary 25 yard pass from Brady Olson, Jack Hennessey kick failed, (5 plays, 83 yards, TOP 02:23; 13-12 Central Connecticut
- (04:40) DUQ - Taj Butts 57 yd run two point pass conversion failed, (2 plays, 64 yards, TOP 00:53; 18-13 Duquesne
- (01:15) DUQ - Ryan Petras 37 yard pass from Tyler Riddell, Matt Clark kick, (2 plays, 70 yards, TOP 00:33; 25-13 Duquesne

Third Quarter

- (13:28) CCSU - Michael Trovarelli 10 yd pass from Brady Olson, Jack Hennessey kick, (3 plays, 76 yards, TOP 01:25; 25-20 Duquesne)

Fourth Quarter

- (09:21) DUQ - Joey Isabella 4 yd pass from Tyler Riddell, Matt Clark kick, (2 plays, 44 yards, TOP 00:49; 32-20 Duquesne
- (07:07) CCSU - Donovan Wadley 50 yd pass from Brady Olson, Jack Hennessey kick, (5 plays, 65 yards, TOP 02:11; 32-27 Duquesne)
- (04:05) CCSU - Michael Trovarelli 40 yd pass from Brady Olson, two point pass conversion failed, (4 plays, 79 yards, TOP 01:48; 33-32 Central Connecticut)
- (03:19) DUQ - Taj Butts 59 yd run, two point pass conversion failed, (2 plays, 65 yards, TOP 00:46; 38-33 Duquesne)

Statistics	CCSU	DUQ
First downs	24	19
Total yards	588	526
Rushing yards	165	344
Passing yards	423	182
Passing: Comp–Att–Int	28–45–2	14–22–0
Time of possession	30:44	29:16

Team	Category	Player	Statistics
Central Connecticut	Passing	Brady Olson	28/45, 423 yards, 4 TD, 2 INT
Central Connecticut	Rushing	Elijah Howard	22 carries, 108 yards, TD
Central Connecticut	Receiving	Peter Cleary	5 receptions, 111 yards, TD
Duquesne	Passing	Tyler Riddell	14/22, 182 yards, 3 TD
Duquesne	Rushing	Taj Butts	14 carries, 254 yards, 3 TD
Duquesne	Receiving	Ryan Petras	2 receptions, 51 yards, TD

=== Mercyhurst ===
Mercyhurst Lakers (5-6) vs. Central Connecticut Blue Devils (7-4) – Game summary

Quarter	1	2	3	4	Total
Lakers	14	7	7	0	28
Blue Devils	14	7	7	7	35

at Arute Field • New Britain, CT

- Date: November 22
- Game time: 12:00 P.M. EDT
- Game weather: Sunny • Temperature: 45 °F (7 °C) • Wind: NW at 7 miles per hour (11 km/h)
- Game attendance: 2015
- Referee: Jonathan Grande
- TV: NEC Front Row

Game information

First Quarter

- (13:05) CCSU - Elijah Howard 22 yd run, Jack Hennessey kick, (1 plays, 22 yards, TOP 00:08; 7-0 Central Connecticut)
- (10:05) MER - Dylan Evans 5 yd run, Max Young kick, (1 plays, 5 yards, TOP 00:05; 7-7 Tied)
- (04:14) MER - Brian Trobel 2 yd run, Max Young kick, (7 plays, 66 yards, TOP 04:44; 14-7 Mercyhurst)
- (00:51) CCSU - Elijah Howard 4 yd run, Jack Hennessey kick, (8 plays, 72 yards, TOP 03:16; 14-14 Tied)

Second Quarter

- (07:30) MER - Brian Trobel 63 yd run, Max Young kick, (3 plays, 81 yards, TOP 00:50; 21-14 Mercyhurst)
- (01:54) CCSU - Michael Trovarelli 15 yd pass from Brady Olson, Jack Hennessey kick, (14 plays, 78 yards, TOP 05:31; 21-21 Tied)

Third Quarter

- (11:17) CCSU - Donny Marcus 17 yd pass from Brady Olson, Jack Hennessey kick, (8 plays, 75 yards, TOP 03:43; 28-21 Central Connecticut)
- (02:03) MER - Taylor Wright-Rawls 11 yd pass from Adam Urena, Max Young kick, (8 plays, 69 yards, TOP 04:37; 28-28 Tied)

Fourth Quarter

- (11:14) CCSU - Elijah Howard 8 yd pass from Brady Olson, Jack Hennessey kick, (6 plays, 12 yards, TOP 02:46; 35-28 Central Connecticut)

Statistics	MERC	CCSU
First downs	24	25
Total yards	457	421
Rushing yards	269	200
Passing yards	188	221
Passing: Comp–Att–Int	17–36–0	22–35–1
Time of possession	29:45	30:15

Team	Category	Player	Statistics
Mercyhurst	Passing	Adam Urena	17/36, 188 yards, TD
Mercyhurst	Rushing	Brian Trobel	21 carries, 166 yards, 2 TD
Mercyhurst	Receiving	Rylan Davison	5 receptions, 94 yards
Central Connecticut	Passing	Brady Olson	22/35, 221 yards, 3 TD, INT
Central Connecticut	Rushing	Elijah Howard	25 carries, 176 yards, 2 TD
Central Connecticut	Receiving	Michael Trovarelli	6 receptions, 73 yards, TD

=== at No. 8 Rhode Island (Division I First Round) ===
2025 NCAA Division I FCS Playoffs First Round
Central Connecticut Blue Devils (8–4) at No. 8 (9) Rhode Island Rams (10–2) – Game summary

Quarter	1	2	3	4	Total
Blue Devils	7	0	0	12	19
No. 8 (9) Rams	14	10	0	3	27

at Meade Stadium • Kingston, RI

- Date: November 29
- Game time: 12:00 PM EST
- Game weather: Clear • Temperature: 40 °F (4 °C) • Wind: NW at 12 miles per hour (19 km/h)
- Game attendance: 2,680
- Referee: Jason Soistman
- TV: ESPN+

Game information

First quarter

- URI – Connor Finer 28-yard pass from Devin Farrell (Garth White kick), 8:48. Rams 7–0. Drive: 10 plays, 62 yards, 4:56.
- URI – Marquis Buchanan 25-yard pass from Devin Farrell (Garth White kick), 6:46. Rams 14–0. Drive: 3 plays, 58 yards, 1:17.
- CCSU – Elijah Howard 3-yard pass from Brady Olson (Jack Hennessey kick), 0:02. Rams 14–7. Drive: 16 plays, 75 yards, 6:44.

Second quarter

- URI – Antwain Littleton Jr. 1-yard run (Garth White kick), 7:49. Rams 21–7. Drive: 8 plays, 77 yards, 3:21.
- URI – Garth White 42-yard field goal, 0:00. Rams 24–7. Drive: 8 plays, 42 yards, 2:22.

Third quarter

- No scoring plays.

Fourth quarter

- CCSU – Damani Williams 25-yard pass from Brady Olson (Jack Hennessey kick BLOCKED), 12:44. Rams 24–13. Drive: 11 plays, 79 yards, 5:25.
- CCSU – Jack Hennessey 18-yard field goal, 9:57. Rams 24–16. Drive: 4 plays, 6 yards, 1:57.
- URI – Garth White 26-yard field goal, 5:03. Rams 27–16. Drive: 9 plays, 56 yards, 4:54.
- CCSU – Jack Hennessey 28-yard field goal, 2:03. Rams 27–19. Drive: 13 plays, 64 yards, 3:00.

Statistics	CCSU	URI
First downs	22	17
Plays–yards	82–382	64–447
Rushes–yards	20–71	26–82
Passing yards	311	365
Passing: Comp–Att–Int	35–62–0	24–38–1
Turnovers	0	1
Time of possession	30:37	29:23

Team	Category	Player	Statistics
Central Connecticut	Passing	Brady Olson	35/62, 311 yards, 2 TD
Central Connecticut	Rushing	Elijah Howard	13 carries, 35 yards
Central Connecticut	Receiving	Michael Trovarelli	11 receptions, 106 yards
Rhode Island	Passing	Devin Farrell	24/38, 365 yards, 2 TD, INT
Rhode Island	Rushing	Brendon Barrow	6 carries, 36 yards
Rhode Island	Receiving	Marquis Buchanan	7 receptions, 101 yards, TD
