= Matthew Schure =

American academic administrator (1948–2023)

Matthew Schure (May 26, 1948 - February 1, 2023) was an American educational psychologist, professor, and college president. Schure served as the second president of New York Institute of Technology (NYIT) from 1982 until 2000, succeeding his father, Alexander Schure, NYIT's founder. Thereafter, in 2000, he became president of Philadelphia College of Osteopathic Medicine (PCOM). During his tenure at PCOM, Schure oversaw an expansion of the college's degree offerings and the opening of its first campus in Georgia. He retired in June 2014.

Schure attended Far Rockaway High School in Queens, New York. He held a bachelor's degree in psychology from Queens College of the City University of New York and M.A., M.Ph., and Ph.D. degrees in psychology from Columbia University.

Schure died at home on February 1, 2023. He was survived by his wife, two children, and five grandchildren.
