= DuPont-Guest Estate =

Historic house in New York, United States

- U.S. National Register of Historic Places
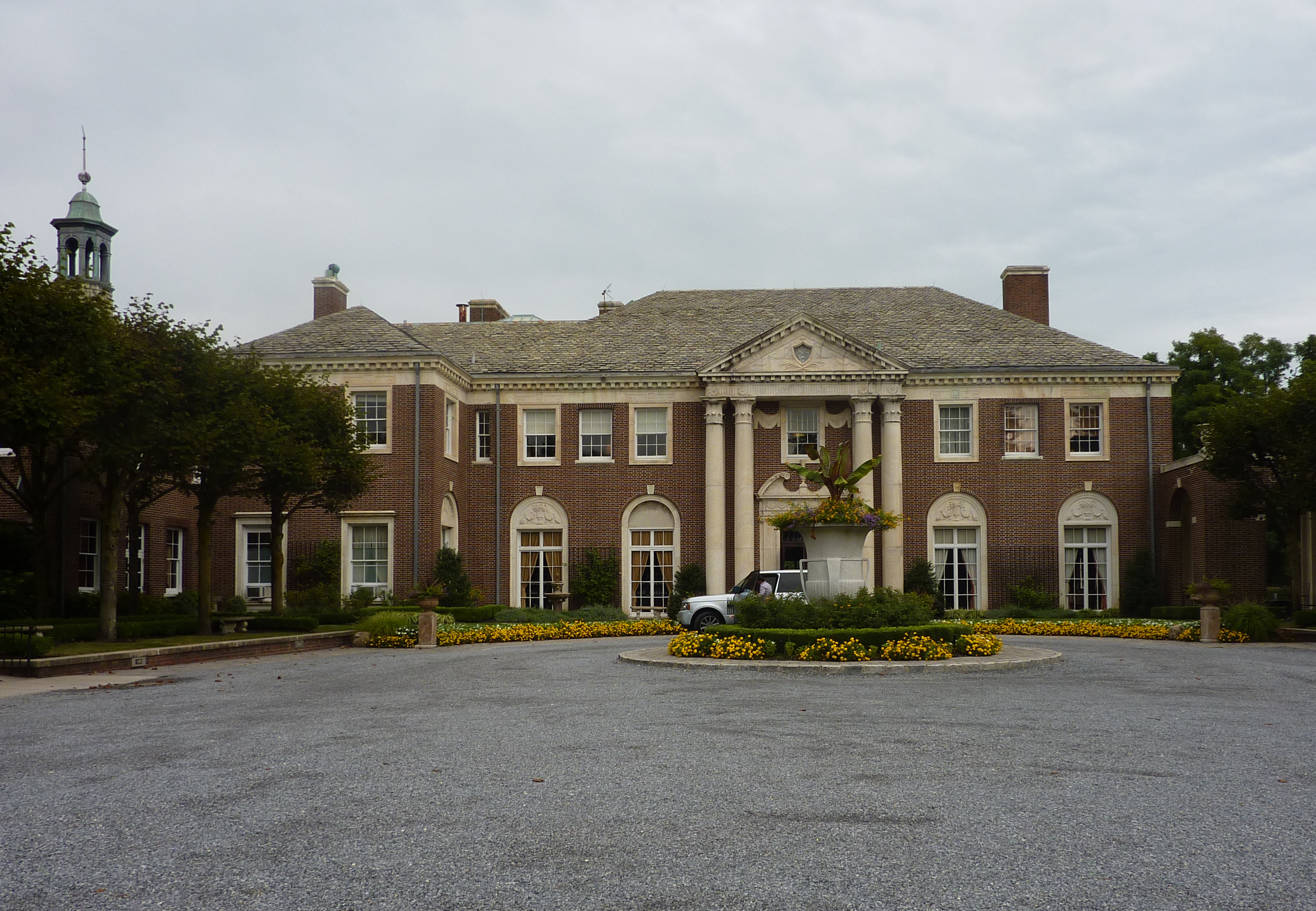
- South façade with the front entrance

- Location within New York Location within the United States
- Location: South side of Northern Blvd. between Cotillion Ct. & DuPont Ct., Brookville, New York
- Coordinates: 40°48′32.31″N 73°36′53.23″W
- Area: 44.24 acres (17.90 ha)
- Built: 1916
- Architect: Carrère and Hastings
- Architectural style: Georgian Revival
- NRHP reference No.: 09001084
- Added to NRHP: December 11, 2009

The DuPont-Guest Estate, now known as the NYIT de Seversky Mansion, is a historic estate located at Brookville in Nassau County, New York. Since 1972, it has been part of the Old Westbury campus of the New York Institute of Technology (NYIT).

== History ==
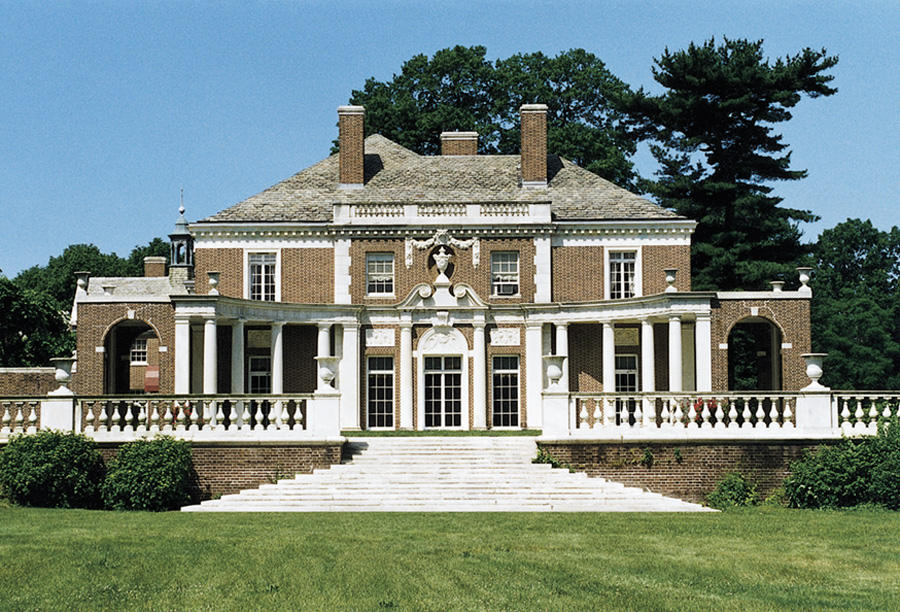
East façade of the house

The home, originally called "White Eagle", was built between 1916 and 1918 for Alicia Heyward (née Bradford) Maddox, the second wife of Alfred I. du Pont and daughter of Judge Edward Bradford. It was designed by the architectural firm of Carrère and Hastings in the Georgian Revival style and the interiors were designed by Charles of London. The residence is two stories plus a basement level, with a red brick façade, white marble and limestone embellishments, and a gabled, slate roof. Alicia du Pont died in January 1920 before the home was finished.

The estate consists of the residence, surrounding landscaping, and garage. It adjoined Harbor Hill, the country seat of Clarence Mackay (to the west), and the home of Harry Payne Whitney (who married Gertrude Vanderbilt) (to the south). It was near to the "homes of many of America's leading financiers, including Nicholas F. Brady, Otto H. Kahn, J. Pierpont Morgan, Thomas H. Hitchcock, Elbert H. Gary and Ormond G. Smith."

=== Later ownership ===
In 1921, the estate (which had been completed and fully furnished in January 1921, but never lived in), which was valued at over $1,500,000, was to be sold at public auction conducted by Arthur C. Sheridan for the benefit of Mrs. du Pont's child by her first marriage, Alicia Maddox, who had been adopted by Alfred du Pont. It was sold for $470,000 to David T. Layman Jr., who was understood to be acting for Howard C. Phipps of the Phipps family.

The property was purchased in the 1920s by Frederick Guest (husband of Amy Phipps) and his family, who called it "Templeton". It was listed on the National Register of Historic Places in 2009.

Since 1972, it has been part of the Old Westbury campus of the New York Institute of Technology (NYIT).
