= Ellis University =

American for-profit online college

- Motto: Aliter Cogitare Aude
- Motto in English: Dare to think differently
- Type: For-Profit
- Active: 1998; 28 years ago – 2016; 10 years ago
- President: Virginia Carlin, Ed.D
- Students: 1338
- Location: Oakbrook Terrace, Illinois, United States
- Campus: Online university
- Colors: Blue White
- Website: www.ellis.edu

Ellis University was an accredited online for-profit college, based in Oakbrook Terrace, Illinois. Ellis University was accredited by the Distance Education Accrediting Commission (DEAC). Ellis University was issued a show cause by DEAC and withdrew its accreditation on September 29, 2016. On December 1, 2016, Ellis University ceased operations following the accreditation review process.

== History ==
Ellis University was founded in 2008 in Chicago.

It was bought in 2012 and changed its name to John Hancock University. In 2015, it changed its name back to Ellis University.
