= Brookville, New York =

Village in New York, United States

- Village
- Incorporated Village of Brookville
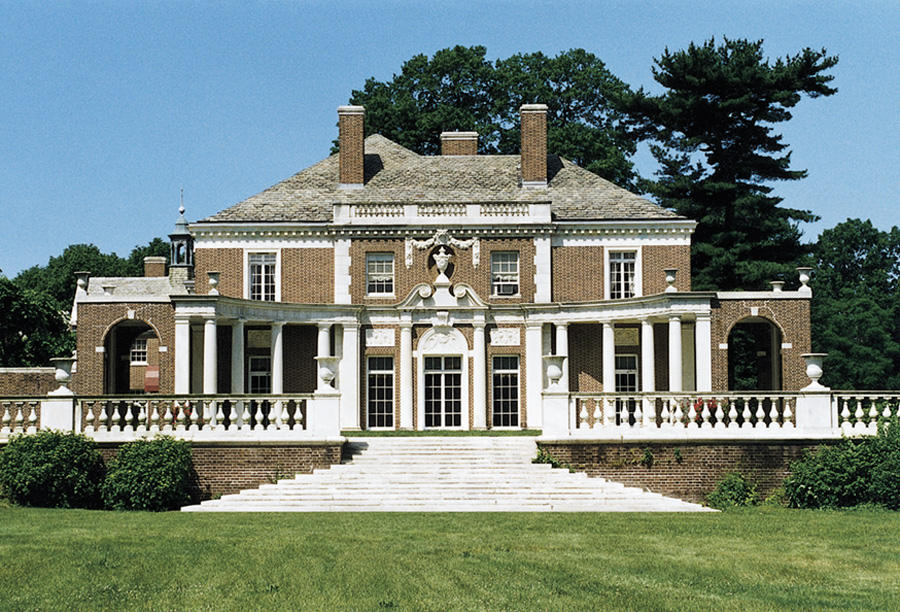
- The DuPont-Guest Estate, one of Brookville's best-known landmarks

- Official Seal of Brookville

- Location in Nassau County and the state of New York

- Location on Long Island Location within the state of New York
- Coordinates: 40°48′55″N 73°34′12″W
- Country: United States
- State: New York
- County: Nassau
- Town: Oyster Bay
- Incorporated: 1931

Government
  - Mayor: Daniel H. Serota
  - Deputy Mayor: Caroline Bazzini

Area
  - Total: 3.96 sq mi (10.25 km^{2})
  - Land: 3.95 sq mi (10.22 km^{2})
  - Water: 0.012 sq mi (0.03 km^{2})
- Elevation: 236 ft (72 m)

Population (2020)
  - Total: 2,939
  - Density: 744.5/sq mi (287.46/km^{2})
- Time zone: UTC-5 (Eastern (EST))
  - Summer (DST): UTC-4 (EDT)
- ZIP Codes: 11545 (Glen Head); 11548 (Greenvale)
- Area codes: 516, 363
- FIPS code: 36-10132
- GNIS feature ID: 0944887
- Website: www.villageofbrookville.gov

Brookville is a village in Oyster Bay, New York, in Nassau County, on the North Shore of Long Island, in New York, United States. The population was 2,939 at the time of the 2020 census.

== History ==
The territory that today comprises the Village of Brookville was formed in two stages. When the village was incorporated in 1931, it consisted of a long, narrow tract of land that was centered along Cedar Swamp Road (NY 107). In the 1950s, the northern portion of the unincorporated area then known as Wheatley Hills was annexed and incorporated into the village, approximately doubling the village's area to its present 2,650 acres (1,070 ha).

When the Town of Oyster Bay purchased what is now Brookville from the Matinecocks in the mid-17th century, the area was known as Suco's Wigwam. Most pioneers were English, many of them Quakers. They were soon joined by Dutch settlers from western Long Island, who called the surrounding area Wolver Hollow, apparently because wolves gathered at spring-fed Shoo Brook to drink. For most of the 19th century, the village was called Tappentown after a prominent family. Brookville became the preferred name after the Civil War and was used on 1873 maps.

Brookville's two centuries as a farm and woodland backwater changed quickly in the early 20th century as wealthy New Yorkers built lavish mansions in the area. By the mid-1920s, there were 22 estates, part of the emergence of Nassau's North Shore Gold Coast. One was Broadhollow, the 108-acre (0.44 km^{2}) spread of attorney-banker-diplomat Winthrop W. Aldrich, which had a 40-room manor house. The second owner of Broadhollow was Alfred Gwynne Vanderbilt Jr., who at one point was president of the Belmont and Pimlico racetracks. Marjorie Merriweather Post, daughter of cereal creator Charles William Post, and her husband Edward Francis Hutton, the famous financier, built a lavish 70-room mansion on 178 acres (0.72 km^{2}) called Hillwood.

In 1931, estate owners banded together to win village incorporation to head off what they saw as undesirable residential and commercial development in other parts of Nassau County. The first Mayor was W. Deering Howe. In 1947, the Post estate was sold to Long Island University for its C. W. Post campus. The campus is noted as the home of the Tilles Center for the Performing Arts. Also in Brookville is the DeSeversky Conference Center of the New York Institute of Technology. The center was formerly Templeton, mansion of socialite and businessman Winston Guest. Templeton was later used as one of the settings for the Dudley Moore film Arthur.

The Chapelle de St. Martin de Sayssuel, also known as the St. Joan of Arc Chapel where Joan of Arc prayed prior to engaging the English, was moved from France to Brookville in the early 20th century. It was acquired by Gertrude Hill Gavin, daughter of James J. Hill, the American railroad magnate. The chapel was dismantled stone by stone and imported from France to her Brookville estate in 1926. The chapel is now located at Marquette University in Wisconsin.

The Brookville Reformed Church, one of the oldest existing church congregations in the country, calls Brookville its home. The Brookville Church was founded by 17th century Dutch settlers.

The James Preserve is a nature preserve in Old Brookville and is the only tract of land showing the natural appearance of the village before development. Although it is in Old Brookville, it is connected to Greenvale.

In 2009, BusinessWeek dubbed Brookville the wealthiest town in America.

== Geography ==
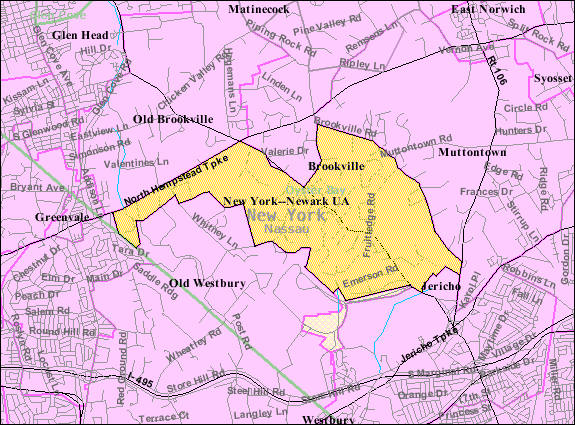
U.S. Census map of Brookville

According to the U.S. Census Bureau, the village has a total area of 4.0 square miles (10 km^{2}), all land.

The village lost territory to the adjacent Incorporated Village of East Hills between the 1960 census and the 1970 census.

== Demographics ==
Historical population
Census	Pop.	Note	%±
1940	204		—
1950	337		65.2%
1960	1,468		335.6%
1970	3,212		118.8%
1980	3,290		2.4%
1990	3,716		12.9%
2000	2,126		−42.8%
2010	3,465		63.0%
2020	2,939		−15.2%
U.S. Decennial Census

=== Racial and ethnic composition ===
Brookville village, New York – Racial and ethnic composition Note: the US Census treats Hispanic/Latino as an ethnic category. This table excludes Latinos from the racial categories and assigns them to a separate category. Hispanics/Latinos may be of any race.
Race / ethnicity (NH = Non-Hispanic)	Pop 2000	Pop 2010	Pop 2020	% 2000	% 2010	% 2020
White alone (NH)	1,866	2,485	2,273	87.77%	71.72%	77.34%
Black or African American alone (NH)	43	372	45	2.02%	10.74%	1.53%
Native American or Alaska Native alone (NH)	0	8	2	0.00%	0.23%	0.07%
Asian alone (NH)	131	351	390	6.16%	10.13%	13.27%
Native Hawaiian or Pacific Islander alone (NH)	0	0	0	0.00%	0.00%	0.00%
Other race alone (NH)	5	8	8	0.24%	0.23%	0.27%
Mixed race or Multiracial (NH)	24	22	69	1.13%	0.63%	2.35%
Hispanic or Latino (any race)	57	219	152	2.68%	6.32%	5.17%
Total	2,126	3,465	2,939	100.00%	100.00%	100.00%

=== 2020 census ===
As of the 2020 census, Brookville had a population of 2,939. The median age was 22.6 years. 14.7% of residents were under the age of 18 and 11.7% were 65 years of age or older. For every 100 females, there were 85.7 males, and for every 100 females age 18 and over, there were 81.3 males.

A total of 99.4% of residents lived in urban areas, while 0.6% lived in rural areas.

There were 625 households, of which 37.6% had children under the age of 18 living in them. Of all households, 79.7% were married-couple households, 7.2% were households with a male householder and no spouse or partner present, and 11.0% were households with a female householder and no spouse or partner present. About 8.9% of all households were made up of individuals, and 5.6% had someone living alone who was 65 years of age or older.

There were 661 housing units, of which 5.4% were vacant. The homeowner vacancy rate was 1.8%, and the rental vacancy rate was 1.4%.

=== 2000 census ===
As of the 2000 census, there were 2,126 people, 631 households, and 569 families residing in the village. The population density was 530.5 inhabitants per square mile (204.8/km^{2}). There were 648 housing units at an average density of 161.7 per square mile (62.4/km^{2}). The racial makeup of the village was 89.75% White, 1.16% African American, 3.16% Asian, 0.56% from other races, and 1.36% from two or more races. Hispanic or Latino of any race were 6.68% of the population.

There were 631 households, out of which 49.9% had children under the age of 18 living with them, 82.9% were married couples living together, 4.9% had a female householder with no husband present, and 9.8% were non-families. 7.9% of all households were made up of individuals, and 4.6% had someone living alone who was 65 years of age or older. The average household size was 3.35 and the average family size was 3.49.

In the village, the population was spread out, with 32.8% under the age of 18, 4.4% from 18 to 24, 26.0% from 25 to 44, 25.1% from 45 to 64, and 11.8% who were 65 years of age or older. The median age was 39 years. For every 100 females, there were 97.8 males. For every 100 females age 18 and over, there were 90.7 males.

The median income for a household in the village was in excess of $200,000 – as was the median income for a family. Males had a median income of over $100,000 versus $60,238 for females. The per capita income for the village was $84,375. None of families or the population were below the poverty line, including none of those under age 18 or those age 65 or over.

=== Income and wealth ===
In 2009, Brookville topped BusinessWeek's list of America's 25 wealthiest towns based on average income and net worth.

== Government ==
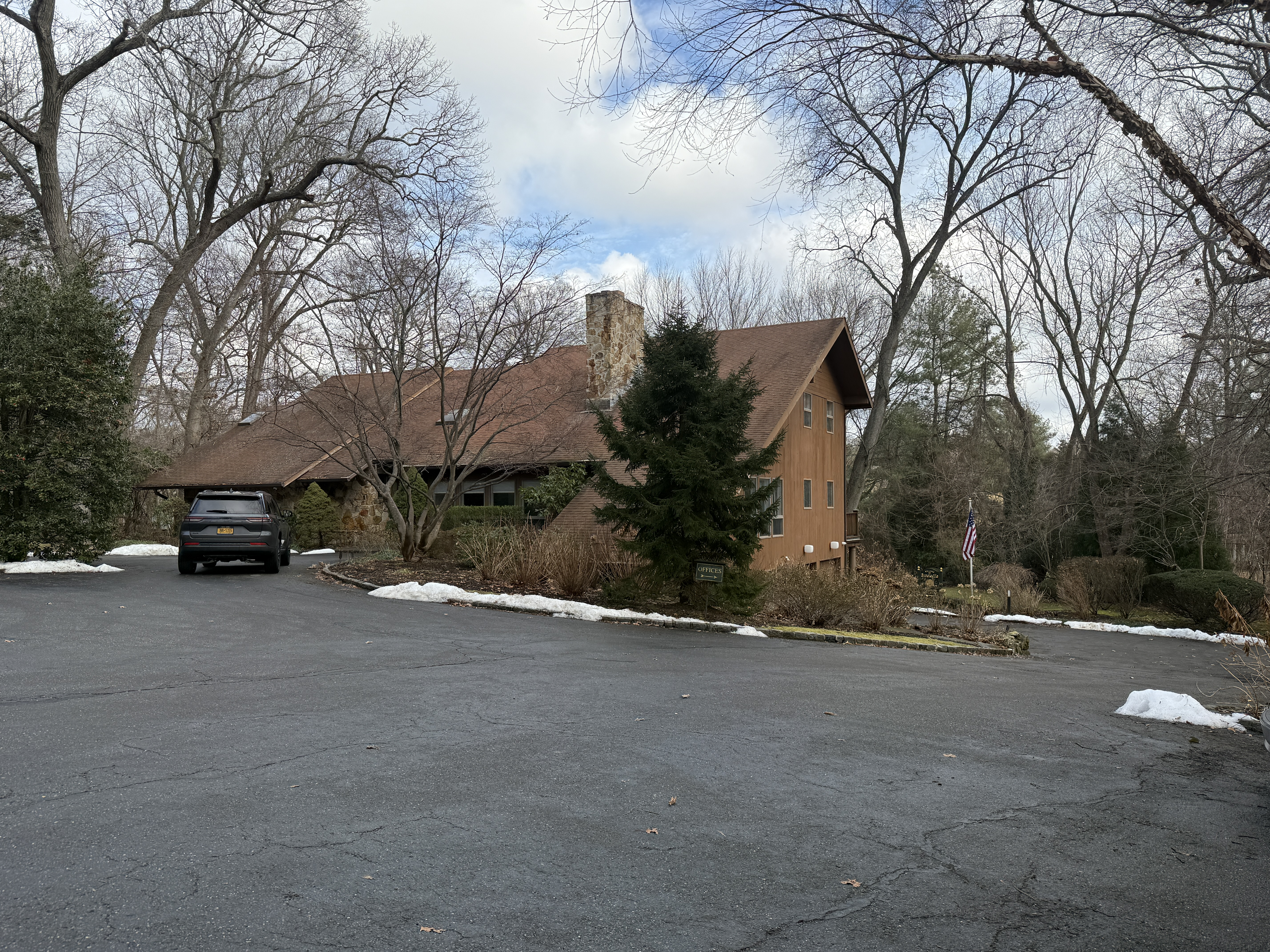
Brookville Village Hall in January 2026

As of August 2021, the Mayor of Brookville is Daniel H. Serota, the Deputy Mayor is Caroline Z. Bazzini, and the Village Trustees are Caroline Z. Bazzini, John A. Burns, Edward J. Chesnik, and Robert D. Spina.

=== Police department ===
The village is protected by the Brookville Police Department, which was established in 2022, after the Old Brookville Police Department announced that it would transit.

=== Politics ===
In the 2024 United States presidential election, the majority of Brookville voters voted for Donald J. Trump (R).

== Education ==
=== K–12 education ===
Brookville is primarily served by the Jericho Union Free School District, though portions are served by the Locust Valley Central School District.

The Long Island Lutheran Middle and High School is also located within the village.

=== Higher education ===
Half of the New York Institute of Technology's 1,050-acre (420 ha) Old Westbury campus is located in the Village of Brookville.

The village is also the home of LIU Post, which is the largest campus of the private Long Island University system.

== Notable people ==
- Winthrop W. Aldrich, U.S. ambassador to the United Kingdom.
- Marc Anthony, singer.
- Arthur Scott Burden, president of Burden Iron Works.
- Joseph E. Davies, second U.S. ambassador to the Soviet Union.
- Angie Dickinson, actress.
- Alfred I. du Pont, inventor, philanthropist.
- Prince Felix and the Royal Family of Luxembourg.
- C. Z. Guest, socialite.
- Frederick Edward Guest, British Cabinet minister.
- Edward Francis Hutton, co-founder, E. F. Hutton & Co.
- Mary McFadden, fashion designer, writer.
- Dina Merrill, actress.
- Marjorie Merriweather Post, philanthropist.
- Cynthia Roche, socialite.
- Diego Suarez, garden designer.
- Percy Uris, real estate investor/builder.
- Alfred Gwynne Vanderbilt Jr., owner of the Belmont and Pimlico racetracks.

== See also ==
- List of municipalities in New York
- Old Brookville, New York
- Upper Brookville, New York
