= 2000 Bryant Bulldogs football team =

American college football season

2000 Bryant Bulldogs football
- Conference: Eastern Football Conference
- Central Division
- Record: 4–6 (3–5 EFC)
- Head coach: Jim Miceli (2nd season)
- Home stadium: Bulldog Stadium

2000 Eastern Football Conference standings
	Conf.			Overall
Team	W		L	W		L
Atlantic Division
C. W. Post xy	7	–	1	8	–	2
Saint Anselm	5	–	3	6	–	4
Southern Connecticut	5	–	3	5	–	5
Merrimack	4	–	5	4	–	6
UMass Lowell	2	–	7	2	–	8
Central Division
American International xy$	8	–	1	9	–	3
Pace	4	–	4	4	–	6
Bentley	4	–	5	5	–	6
Assumption	3	–	5	5	–	6
Bryant	3	–	5	4	–	6
Stonehill	2	–	8	2	–	8
Championship: American International 20, C. W. Post 10
$ – Conference champion; x – Division champion/co-champions; y – Championship game participant

The 2000 Bryant Bulldogs football team represented Bryant College as a member the Central Division of the Eastern Football Conference (EFC) during the 2000 NCAA Division II football season in the United States. The Bulldogs were led by second-year head coach Jim Miceli and played their home games at Bulldog Stadium. Bryant compiled an overall record of 4–6 with a mark of 3–5 in conference play, tying for fourth place in the EFC's Central Division.

== Schedule ==
Date	Opponent	Site	Result	Attendance
September 9	at Sacred Heart*	Campus Field; Fairfield, CT	L 15–19	2,173
September 16	Pace	Bulldog Stadium; Smithfield, RI	W 34–21	1,231
September 23	Assumption	Bulldog Stadium; Smithfield, RI	W 49–13	4,837
September 30	at Mount Ida*	Alumni Field; Newton, MA	W 63–0	257
October 5	at Bentley	Bentley Field; Waltham, MA	L 7–17	361
October 14	Saint Anselm	Bulldog Stadium; Smithfield, RI	L 20–28	1,587
October 21	at UMass Lowell	Cawley Memorial Stadium; Lowell, MA	L 21–26	518
October 28	at Stonehill	Chieftain Stadium; Easton, MA	L 13–45	877
November 4	American International	Bulldog Stadium; Smithfield, RI	L 36–44 ^{4OT}	1,423
November 12	Merrimack	Bulldog Stadium; Smithfield, RI	W 17–14	828
*Non-conference game
