= 2002 Bryant Bulldogs football team =

American college football season

2002 Bryant Bulldogs football
- Conference: Northeast-10 Conference
- Record: 5–6 (5–5 NE-10)
- Head coach: Jim Miceli (4th season)
- Offensive coordinator: Damian Wroblewski (2nd season)
- Defensive coordinator: Paul Castonia (2nd season)
- Home stadium: Bulldog Stadium

2002 Northeast-10 Conference football standings
	Conf.			Overall
Team	W		L	W		L
No. 10 C. W. Post $^	10	–	1	11	–	1
No. 24 Bentley	9	–	1	10	–	1
Southern Connecticut	7	–	3	8	–	3
Merrimack	6	–	4	6	–	4
Saint Anselm	5	–	5	5	–	5
American International	5	–	5	5	–	6
Bryant	5	–	5	5	–	6
Pace	3	–	7	3	–	7
UMass Lowell	3	–	7	3	–	8
Assumption	1	–	9	2	–	9
Stonehill	1	–	9	2	–	9
$ – Conference champion; ^ – NCAA Division II playoff participant; Rankings from AFCA poll

The 2002 Bulldogs football team represented Bryant College as a member of Northeast-10 Conference (NE-10) during the 2002 NCAA Division II football season. The Bulldogs were led by fourth-year head coach Jim Miceli and played their home games at Bulldog Stadium. They finished the season 5–6 overall and 5–5 in NE-10 play.

== Schedule ==
Date	Opponent	Site	Result	Attendance
August 31	at Rhode Island*	Meade Stadium; Kingston, RI	L 0–28	3,346
September 6	at Southern Connecticut	Jess Dow Field; New Haven, CT	L 21–37	1,476
September 14	C. W. Post	Bulldog Stadium; Smithfield, RI	L 3–14	1,537
September 21	Pace	Bulldog Stadium; Smithfield, RI	W 26–0	1,174
September 28	Assumption	Bulldog Stadium; Smithfield, RI	W 43–28	4,062
October 11	at Bentley	Bentley Field; Waltham, MA	L 22–44	650
October 19	Saint Anselm	Bulldog Stadium; Smithfield, RI	W 25–13	3,918
October 26	at UMass Lowell	Cawley Memorial Stadium; Lowell, MA	W 12–6	109
November 2	at Stonehill	Chieftain Stadium; Easton, MA	W 9–8	973
November 9	American International	Bulldog Stadium; Smithfield, RI	L 33–40 ^{2OT}	1,888
November 16	at Merrimack	Warrior Field; North Andover, MA	L 14–20	648
*Non-conference game
