= 2001 Bryant Bulldogs football team =

American college football season

2001 Bryant Bulldogs football
- Conference: Northeast-10 Conference
- Record: 4–5 (4–5 NE-10)
- Head coach: Jim Miceli (3rd season)
- Offensive coordinator: Damian Wroblewski (1st season)
- Defensive coordinator: Paul Castonia (1st season)
- Home stadium: Bulldog Stadium

2001 Northeast-10 Conference football standings
	Conf.			Overall
Team	W		L	W		L
No. 19 C. W. Post y$	9	–	1	11	–	1
Bentley y	8	–	2	9	–	3
American International	8	–	2	8	–	2
Merrimack	6	–	4	6	–	4
Southern Connecticut	6	–	4	6	–	4
Saint Anselm	5	–	5	5	–	5
Bryant	4	–	5	4	–	5
Pace	4	–	5	4	–	5
Stonehill	3	–	7	4	–	7
UMass Lowell	1	–	9	1	–	9
Assumption	0	–	10	1	–	10
Championship: C. W. Post 43, Bentley 6
$ – Conference champion; y – Championship game participant; Rankings from AFCA poll

The 2001 Bryant Bulldogs football team represented Bryant College as a member of Northeast-10 Conference (NE-10) during the 2001 NCAA Division II football season. The Bulldogs were led by third-year head coach Jim Miceli and played their home games at Bulldog Stadium. They finished the season 4–5 overall and 4–5 in NE-10 play.

== Schedule ==
Date	Opponent	Site	Result	Attendance
September 1	Southern Connecticut	Bulldog Stadium; Smithfield, RI	W 17–7	3,305
September 8	at C. W. Post	Hickox Field; Brookville, NY	L 7–34	1,800
September 22	at Assumption	Rocheleau Field; Worcester, MA	W 52–36	1,069
October 6	Bentley	Bulldog Stadium; Smithfield, RI	L 0–7	1,053
October 13	at Saint Anselm	Grappone Stadium; Goffstown, NH	L 16–31	3,622
October 20	UMass Lowell	Bulldog Stadium; Smithfield, RI	W 31–16	4,622
October 27	Stonehill	Bulldog Stadium; Smithfield, RI	W 40–26	1,342
November 3	at American International	John Homer Miller Field; Springfield, MA	L 14–23	1,157
November 10	Merrimack	Bulldog Stadium; Smithfield, RI	L 3–17	3,103
