= 1999 Bryant Bulldogs football team =

American college football season

1999 Bryant Bulldogs football
- Conference: Eastern Football Conference
- Central Division
- Record: 5–4 (4–4 EFC)
- Head coach: Jim Miceli (1st season)
- Home stadium: Bulldog Stadium

1999 Eastern Football Conference standings
	Conf.			Overall
Team	W		L	W		L
Atlantic Division
C. W. Post xy	7	–	1	9	–	2
Southern Connecticut	6	–	2	7	–	3
Merrimack	6	–	3	7	–	3
Saint Anselm	4	–	4	4	–	5
UMass Lowell	3	–	6	3	–	7
Central Division
American International xy$	8	–	1	10	–	2
Pace	5	–	3	6	–	4
Bryant	4	–	4	5	–	4
Bentley	3	–	6	4	–	7
Assumption	1	–	7	3	–	7
Stonehill	0	–	10	0	–	10
Championship: American International 41, C. W. Post 20
$ – Conference champion; x – Division champion/co-champions; y – Championship game participant

The 1999 Bryant Bulldogs football team represented Bryant College as a member the Central Division of the Eastern Football Conference (EFC) during the 1999 NCAA Division II football season. The Bulldogs were led by first-year head coach Jim Miceli and played their home games at Bulldog Stadium. Bryant compiled an overall record of 5–4 with a mark of 4–4 in conference play, placing third in the EFC's Central Division.

== Schedule ==
Date	Opponent	Site	Result	Attendance
September 11	at Assumption	Rocheleau Field; Worcester, MA	W 20–13	2,204
September 18	at Pace	Finnerty Field; Pleasantville, NY	L 7–13	800
October 2	Mount Ida*	Bulldog Stadium; Smithfield, RI	W 31–20	4,817
October 9	Bentley	Bulldog Stadium; Smithfield, RI	W 44–39	1,226
October 16	at Saint Anselm	Grappone Stadium; Goffstown, NH	W 27–7	3,819
October 23	UMass Lowell	Bulldog Stadium; Smithfield, RI	L 3–13	2,726
October 30	Stonehill	Bulldog Stadium; Smithfield, RI	W 24–7	1,519
November 6	at American International	John Homer Miller Field; Springfield, MA	L 20–60	2,471
November 13	Merrimack	Bulldog Stadium; Smithfield, RI	L 10–20	2,412
*Non-conference game
