= 2004 Bryant Bulldogs football team =

American college football season

2004 Bryant Bulldogs football
- Conference: Northeast-10 Conference
- Record: 4–5 (4–5 NE-10)
- Head coach: Marty Fine (1st season)
- Defensive coordinator: Marc Klaiman (1st season)
- Home stadium: Bulldog Stadium

2004 Northeast-10 Conference football standings
	Conf.			Overall
Team	W		L	W		L
No. 20 Bentley +^	8	–	1	8	–	2
C. W. Post +^	8	–	1	8	–	3
Southern Connecticut	7	–	2	8	–	2
Merrimack	7	–	2	8	–	2
American International	5	–	4	5	–	4
Bryant	4	–	5	4	–	5
Saint Anselm	3	–	6	4	–	6
Stonehill	2	–	7	2	–	7
Assumption	1	–	8	1	–	9
Pace	0	–	9	0	–	10
+ – Conference co-champions; ^ – NCAA Division II playoff participant; Rankings from AFCA poll

The 2004 Bryant Bulldogs football team represented Bryant University as a member of Northeast-10 Conference (NE-10) during the 2004 NCAA Division II football season. The Bulldogs were led by first-year head coach Marty Fine and played their home games at Bulldog Stadium. They finished the season 4–5 overall and 4–5 in NE-10 play.

== Schedule ==
Date	Opponent	Site	Result	Attendance
September 4	at American International	John Homer Miller Field; Springfield, MA	L 7–15	677
September 11	Merrimack	Bulldog Stadium; Smithfield, RI	L 7–20	2,684
September 18	Assumption	Bulldog Stadium; Smithfield, RI	W 24–6	2,824
September 25	at Pace	Finnerty Field; Pleasantville, NY	W 24–19	1,453
October 2	C. W. Post	Bulldog Stadium; Smithfield, RI	L 0–24	3,543
October 8	at Stonehill	Chieftain Stadium; Easton, MA	W 31-6	1,086
October 15	Saint Anselm	Bulldog Stadium; Smithfield, RI	W 28-21 ^{2OT}	3,836
October 29	at Bentley	Bentley Field; Waltham, MA	L 0-42	1,750
November 6	Southern Connecticut	Bulldog Stadium; Smithfield, RI	L 20-35	3,636
