= 2005 Bryant Bulldogs football team =

American college football season

2005 Bryant Bulldogs football
- Conference: Northeast-10 Conference
- Record: 7–3 (6–3 NE-10)
- Head coach: Marty Fine (2nd season)
- Defensive coordinator: Marc Klaiman (2nd season)
- Home stadium: Bulldog Stadium

2005 Northeast-10 Conference football standings
	Conf.			Overall
Team	W		L	W		L
No. 22 C. W. Post $^	8	–	1	10	–	3
Southern Connecticut ^	7	–	2	8	–	3
Bentley	7	–	2	7	–	3
Bryant	6	–	3	7	–	3
American International	5	–	4	5	–	4
Stonehill	4	–	5	4	–	6
Assumption	3	–	6	4	–	6
Merrimack	3	–	6	4	–	6
Pace	2	–	7	3	–	7
Saint Anselm	0	–	9	1	–	9
$ – Conference champion; ^ – NCAA Division II playoff participant; Rankings from AFCA poll

The 2005 Bryant Bulldogs football team represented Bryant University as a member of Northeast-10 Conference (NE-10) during the 2005 NCAA Division II football season. The Bulldogs were led by second-year head coach Marty Fine and played their home games at Bulldog Stadium. They finished the season 7–3 overall and 6–3 in NE-10 play.

== Schedule ==
Date	Opponent	Site	Result	Attendance
September 3	American International	Bulldog Stadium; Smithfield, RI	W 21–0	4,310
September 10	at Merrimack	Warrior Field; North Andover, MA	L 40–41 ^{OT}	2,000
September 18	at Assumption	Multi-sport Stadium; Worcester, MA	W 48–38	1,434
September 24	Pace	Bulldog Stadium; Smithfield, RI	W 20–19	4,820
October 2	at C. W. Post	Hickox Field; Brookville, NY	L 15–37	3,892
October 8	Stonehill	Bulldog Stadium; Smithfield, RI	W 24–12	3,686
October 15	at Saint Anselm	Grappone Stadium; Goffstown, NH	W 27–0	238
October 22	Becker*	Bulldog Stadium; Smithfield, RI	W 55–7	3,608
October 29	Bentley	Bulldog Stadium; Smithfield, RI	W 27–14	3,571
November 5	at Southern Connecticut	Jess Dow Field; New Haven, CT	L 35–77	2,837
*Non-conference game
