= 2003 Bryant Bulldogs football team =

American college football season

2003 Bryant Bulldogs football
- Conference: Northeast-10 Conference
- Record: 3–7 (3–6 NE-10)
- Head coach: Jim Miceli (5th season)
- Home stadium: Bulldog Stadium

2003 Northeast-10 Conference football standings
	Conf.			Overall
Team	W		L	W		L
No. 19 Bentley $^	9	–	0	10	–	1
C. W. Post	8	–	1	9	–	2
Southern Connecticut	7	–	2	9	–	2
Merrimack	6	–	3	6	–	3
American International	5	–	4	5	–	4
Bryant	3	–	6	3	–	7
Assumption	2	–	7	4	–	7
Saint Anselm	2	–	7	3	–	7
Pace	2	–	7	2	–	8
Stonehill	1	–	8	1	–	10
$ – Conference champion; ^ – NCAA Division II playoff participant; Rankings from AFCA poll

The 2003 Bryant Bulldogs football team represented Bryant College as a member of Northeast-10 Conference (NE-10) during the 2003 NCAA Division II football season. The Bulldogs were led by fifth-year head coach Jim Miceli and played their home games at Bulldog Stadium. They finished the season 3–7 overall and 3–6 in NE-10 play.

== Schedule ==
Date	Opponent	Site	Result	Attendance
September 6	Pace	Bulldog Stadium; Smithfield, RI	W 31–24	1,731
September 19	at Southern Connecticut	Jess Dow Field; New Haven, CT	L 21-28	640
September 27	American International	Bulldog Stadium; Smithfield, RI	L 22–33	1,591
October 4	Bentley	Bulldog Stadium; Smithfield, RI	L 20-51	3,866
October 11	at Assumption	Rocheleau Field; Worcester, MA	W 33-6	1,469
October 18	at C. W. Post	Hickox Field; Brookville, NY	L 7-20	3,532
October 25	Stonehill	Bulldog Stadium; Smithfield, RI	W 38-16	3,821
November 1	at Merrimack	Warrior Field; North Andover, MA	L 19-34	934
November 8	at Saint Anselm	Grappone Stadium; Goffstown, NH	L 3-10	1,120
November 15	Gannon*	Bulldog Stadium; Smithfield, RI	L 15-35	523
*Non-conference game
