= 1977 Lowell Chiefs football team =

American college football season

1977 Lowell Chiefs football

NCFA champion NECFC champion

NCFA Championship Game, W 41–6 vs. Duquesne
- Conference: New England Colonial Football Conference
- Record: 10–0 (8–0 NECFC)
- Head coach: John Perreault (3rd season)
- Captains: Ken Gauthier; Tipper Durkin; Bill Florence; Mike McKeon
- Home stadium: Cawley Stadium

The 1977 Lowell Chiefs football team was an American football team that represented the University of Lowell (later renamed University of Massachusetts Lowell) as a member of the New England Colonial Football Conference (NECFC) during the 1977 National Collegiate Football Association (NCFA) season. In their third year under head coach John Perreault, the Chiefs compiled a perfect 10–0 record (8–0 in conference games), won the NECFC championship, defeated Duquesne in the NCFA Championship Game, held seven opponents to seven or fewer points, and outscored all opponents by a total of 380 to 56.

The NECC coaches selected Lowell's junior fullback Ken Gauthier as the conference's most valuable player and Perreault as the coach of the year. Gauthier totaled 494 rushing yards with an average of 6.3 yards per carry. Another Lowell back, Terry Coleman, led the conference with 1,322 rushing yards and 20 touchdowns.

Nine Lowell players selected for the all-conference team were: Gauthier at fullback; Coleman at running back; Tipper Durkin at quarterback; Mike McKeon at offensive tackle; Marty McLain at center; Bill Kulis at defensive end; Russ Calla at middle guard; Bill Florence at linebacker; and Steve Pepe at cornerback.

Perreault also led the 1979 Lowell team to a second national championship in three years and led the team to varsity status in 1980.

The team played its home games at Cawley Stadium in Lowell, Massachusetts.

== Schedule ==
Date	Opponent	Site	Result	Attendance	Source
September 17	St. John Fisher*	Cawley Stadium; Lowell, MA	W 18–11		
September 24	Stonehill	Cawley Stadium; Lowell, MA	W 27–0		
October 1	at Bentley	Waltham, MA	W 27–0		
October 8	at Hartford	Hartford, CT	W 49–6		
October 15	Worcester State	Cawley Stadium; Lowell, MA	W 69–13	1,000	
October 22	Western New England	Cawley Stadium; Lowell, MA	W 7–6	2,000	
October 29	at Saint Michael's	Winooski, VT	W 51–0		
November 5	Assumption (MA)	Alumni Field; Worcester, MA	W 35–14		
November 13	Providence	Cawley Stadium; Lowell, MA	W 46–0	2,100	
November 19	Duquesne*	Cawley Stadium; Lowell, MA (NCFA Championship Game)	W 41–6	3,000	
*Non-conference game
