= Kris Kulzer =

American football coach (born c. 1983)

Current position
- Title: Defensive line coach
- Team: Bryant
- Conference: CAA Football

Biographical details
- Born: c. 1983 (age 42–43); Troy, New York, U.S.
- Education: Hudson Valley Community College (2004); American International College (2007, 2010)

Playing career
- 2002–2004: Hudson Valley
- 2005–2006: American International
- Position: Defensive lineman

Coaching career (HC unless noted)
- 2008–2009: American International (GA)
- 2010: Hudson Valley (DC)
- 2011–2019: American International (AHC/co-DC/S/LB)
- 2020–2022: American International
- 2023–present: Bryant (DL)

Head coaching record
- Overall: 5–15

Kristofer Kulzer (born c. 1983) is an American college football coach. He is the defensive line coach for Bryant University, a position he has held since 2023. He was the head football coach for American International College from 2020 to 2022. He also coached for Hudson Valley Community College. He played college football for Hudson Valley College and American International as a defensive lineman.

== Head coaching record ==
Year	Team	Overall	Conference	Standing	Bowl/playoffs
American International Yellow Jackets (Northeast-10 Conference) (2020–2022)
2020–21	No team—COVID-19				
2021	American International	4–6	2–6	T–7th	
2022	American International	1–9	1–6	T–7th	
American International:		5–15	3–12		
Total:		5–15			
