= Russ Peterson (coach) =

American college sports coach (c. 1907 – 1996)

Biographical details
- Born: c. 1907; Brooklyn, New York, U.S
- Died: July 15, 1996 (aged 89); Agawam, Massachusetts, U.S.

Playing career

Football
- 1929–1931: Springfield
- Position: Guard

Coaching career (HC unless noted)

Football
- 1932: Springfield Trade School (MA)
- 1934–1940: American International
- 1941–1947: Boston University (line)
- 1948: Boston University (freshmen)
- 1953–1958: Springfield Technical HS (MA)

Basketball
- 1933–1941: American International
- 1941–1943: Boston University (freshmen)
- 1945–1948: Boston University

Baseball
- 1943: Boston University

Administrative career (AD unless noted)
- 1933–1941: American International
- 1949–1953: Arlington HS (MA)
- 1959–1970: Springfield Public Schools (MA)

Head coaching record
- Overall: 16–27–2 (college football); 81–77 (college basketball)

Russell E. Peterson (c. 1907 – July 15, 1996) was an American college basketball, football, and baseball coach. He served as a multi-sport coach at American International College and Boston University.

== Early life ==
Peterson was born in Brooklyn. He grew up in Springfield, Massachusetts, where he attended the High School of Commerce. He then continued on to Springfield College, where he played football and lacrosse. He graduated as a member of the class of 1932.

== Coaching career ==
Peterson began his coaching career as an assistant football coach at the Springfield Trade School. In 1933, American International College president Chester McGown hired Peterson as the school's first athletic director. Peterson established the American International basketball program in 1933, and its football, baseball, and soccer programs in 1934. On October 13, 1939, Peterson coached American International to perhaps its greatest victory, a 7–6 upset of heavy favorites Saint Anselm at Pynchon Park. Trailing 6–0 with 1:30 remaining, American International elected to punt, but the kicker dropped the wet ball, and was forced to run. A block gave tailback Joe O'Grady an opening and he ran 60 yards for a touchdown. Future American International coach Henry Butova kicked the extra point to seal the victory. Peterson served as both the head football and basketball coach at American International. From 1934 to 1940, his football teams compiled a 16–27–2 record. As the basketball coach from 1933 to 1941, he compiled a 45–59 record.

In 1941, he was hired by Boston University as the line coach for its football team and as the freshman coach for its basketball program. In 1943, Boston University also appointed Peterson as its head baseball coach. That year, he temporarily left the school to take a commission in the United States Navy as a physical education instructor during World War II. Peterson returned to BU and served as the head coach of the basketball team from 1945 to 1948 and compiled a 36–18 record. In 1948, he was promoted to the position of freshman football coach. In August 1949, Peterson resigned from his posts at BU in order to take an athletic director position at Arlington High School in Arlington, Massachusetts. In 1953, he took over as head football coach at Springfield Technical High School, where he remained until 1958, when he resigned in order to become athletic director for Springfield, Massachusetts public schools. He retired in 1970.

== Death ==
Peterson died at the age of 89, on July 15, 1996, at a nursing home in Agawam, Massachusetts.

== Head coaching record ==
=== College football ===
Year	Team	Overall	Conference	Standing	Bowl/playoffs
American International Yellow Jackets (Independent) (1934–1940)
1934	American International	1–4–1			
1935	American International	0–5			
1936	American International	2–4			
1937	American International	4–2–1			
1938	American International	1–6			
1939	American International	3–4			
1940	American International	5–2			
American International:		16–27–2			
Total:		16–27–2			
