= Radulski =

Radulski is a surname. Notable people with the surname include:

- Tom Radulski (born 1955), American football player and coach
- Yulian Radulski (1972–2013), Bulgarian chess grandmaster
