= Dom Anile =

American football and baseball player and coach (1937–2018)

Biographical details
- Born: December 19, 1937
- Died: February 23, 2018 (aged 80); Henderson, Nevada, U.S.

Playing career

Football
- 1956–1959: C. W. Post

Coaching career (HC unless noted)

Football
- 1968–1979: C. W. Post
- 1981–1982: Columbia (OC)

Baseball
- 1961–1968: C. W. Post

Administrative career (AD unless noted)
- 1983–1994: Cleveland Browns (scout)
- 1995–1997: Carolina Panthers (director of player personnel)
- 1998–2003: Indianapolis Colts (director of football operations)
- 2004–2005: Indianapolis Colts (assistant GM)

Head coaching record
- Overall: 84–34–1 (football); 70–77–3 (baseball)
- Bowls: 0–1
- Tournaments: 0–1 (NCAA D-III playoffs)

Dominick Anile Sr. (December 19, 1937 – February 23, 2018) was an American football and baseball player and coach. He served as the head football coach at C. W. Post College—now known as LIU Post—in Brookville, New York from 1968 to 1979. After stepping away from coaching, he was a scout and administrator for the Cleveland Browns, Carolina Panthers and Indianapolis Colts of the National Football League (NFL).

== Head coaching record ==
=== Football ===
Year	Team	Overall	Conference	Standing	Bowl/playoffs
C. W. Post Pioneers (NCAA College Division independent) (1968–1971)
1968	C. W. Post	7–3			
1969	C. W. Post	6–4			
1970	C. W. Post	7–3			
1971	C. W. Post	8–3			L Boardwalk
C. W. Post Pioneers (Metropolitan Intercollegiate Conference) (1972–1977)
1972	C. W. Post	6–3	3–0	1st	
1973	C. W. Post	10–1	5–0	1st	
1974	C. W. Post	6–4	4–0	1st	
1975	C. W. Post	9–1	4–0	1st	
1976	C. W. Post	8–3	3–0	1st	L NCAA Division III Quarterfinal
1977	C. W. Post	5–3–1	3–0	2nd	
C. W. Post Pioneers (NCAA Division II independent) (1978–1979)
1978	C. W. Post	7–2			
1979	C. W. Post	5–4			
C. W. Post:		84–34–1	0–2		
Total:		84–34–1			
National championship Conference title Conference division title or championship game berth
