= Jim Miceli (American football) =

American football coach (born 1957)

Current position
- Title: Head coach
- Team: Toll Gate HS (RI)
- Record: 3–28

Biographical details
- Born: April 24, 1957 (age 69); Mamaroneck, New York, U.S.

Playing career
- 1976: Norwich
- 1977–1979: Southern Connecticut
- Position: Offensive lineman

Coaching career (HC unless noted)
- 1980: Milford Academy (CT) (OL)
- 1981 (spring): Pittsburgh (GA)
- 1981: Milford Academy (CT) (AHC/DC)
- 1982: Pittsburgh (assistant DL/JV)
- 1983–1985: Norwalk HS (CT)
- 1986–1987: Old Tappan HS (NJ)
- 1988–1991: Ramapo
- 1992: Pittsburgh (TE)
- 1993 (spring): Wisconsin (RC)
- 1993: Maryland (RC)
- 1994–1996: Maryland (TE/RC)
- 1997–2003: Bryant
- 2004: Fordham (LB)
- 2005–2008: Georgetown (OC)
- 2010–2012: Akron (AHC/RB/RC)
- 2013: Gilman School (MD) (co-OC/QB)
- 2014–2015: Rhode Island (QB/RC)
- 2016–2019: Rhode Island (RB)
- 2020–2021: Chariho HS (RI) (assistant)
- 2022–present: Toll Gate HS (RI)

Head coaching record
- Overall: 49–37 (college); 3–28 (high school)
- Bowls: 1–1

Accomplishments and honors

Awards
- NJAC Coach of the Year (1988)

James Miceli (born April 24, 1957) is an American football coach. He is the head football coach at Toll Gate High School, a position he has held since 2022. He was the head football coach for Norwalk High School from 1983 to 1985, Old Tappan High School from 1986 to 1987, Ramapo College from 1988 to 1991, and Bryant College—now known as Bryant University—from 1997 to 2003. He also coached for Milford Academy, Pittsburgh, Wisconsin, Maryland, Fordham, Georgetown, Akron, Gilman School, Rhode Island, and Chariho High School. He played college football for Norwich, briefly for Dean, and Southern Connecticut as an offensive lineman before a neck injury ended his career.

== Head coaching record ==
=== College ===
Year	Team	Overall	Conference	Standing	Bowl/playoffs
Ramapo Roadrunners (New Jersey Athletic Conference) (1988–1991)
1988	Ramapo	6–2	4–2	3rd	
1989	Ramapo	7–2	4–2	T–3rd	
1990	Ramapo	9–1	5–1	2nd	W ECAC South
1991	Ramapo	6–4	4–2	3rd	L ECAC Southwest
Ramapo:		28–9	17–7		
Bryant Bulldogs (Eastern Football Conference) (1999–2003)
1999	Bryant	5–4	4–4	3rd (Central)	
2000	Bryant	4–6	3–5	T–4th (Central)	
Bryant Bulldogs (Northeast-10 Conference) (2001–2003)
2001	Bryant	4–5	4–5	T–7th	
2002	Bryant	5–6	5–5	T–6th	
2003	Bryant	3–7	3–6	6th	
Bryant:		21–28	19–25		
Total:		49–37			

=== High school ===
Year	Team	Overall	Conference	Standing	Bowl/playoffs
Toll Gate Titans () (2022–present)
2022	Toll Gate	0–10	0–7	8th	
2023	Toll Gate	1–8	1–5	7th	
2024	Toll Gate	2–9	1–8	9th	
2025	Toll Gate	0–1	0–0		
Toll Gate:		3–28	2–20		
Total:					
