= Art Wilkins =

American football coach (born c. 1950

Biographical details
- Born: c. 1950 (age 75–76); Mount Vernon, New York, U.S.

Playing career
- 1968–1971: Bucknell
- Position: Guard

Coaching career (HC unless noted)
- 1974–1977: Penn State (assistant)
- 1978–1984: Bucknell (DC/LB)
- 1985–1988: Appalachian State (LB)
- 1989–1993: South Carolina (OC)
- 1994–2019: American International

Head coaching record
- Overall: 151–118
- Tournaments: 0–2 (NCAA D-II playoffs)

Accomplishments and honors

Championships
- 3 ECFC Bay State Division (1997–1999); 1 ECFC Central Division (2000); 2 ECFC (1999–2000); 3 NE-10 (2008, 2010, 2013)

Awards
- 2× NE-10 Coach of the Year (2008, 2013)

Arthur Wilkins (born c. 1950) is an American former college football coach. He was the head football coach for American International College from 1994 to 2019. He previously coached for South Carolina, Appalachian State, Bucknell, and Penn State. He played college football for Bucknell as a guard.

== Head coaching record ==
| Year | Team | Overall | Conference | Standing | Bowl/playoffs | AFCA^{#} |
|---|---|---|---|---|---|---|
American International Yellow Jackets (NCAA Division II independent) (1994–1996)
| 1994 | American International | 3–7 | | | | |
| 1995 | American International | 2–8 | | | | |
| 1996 | American International | 6–4 | | | | |
American International Yellow Jackets (Eastern Football Conference) (1997–2000)
| 1997 | American International | 8–4 | 8–0 | 1st (Bay State) | | |
| 1998 | American International | 7–4 | 7–2 | T–1st (Bay State) | | |
| 1999 | American International | 10–2 | 8–1 | 1st (Bay State) | | |
| 2000 | American International | 9–3 | 8–1 | 1st (Central) | | |
American International Yellow Jackets (Northeast-10 Conference) (2001–2019)
| 2001 | American International | 8–2 | 8–2 | T–2nd | | |
| 2002 | American International | 5–6 | 5–5 | T–5th | | |
| 2003 | American International | 5–4 | 5–4 | 5th | | |
| 2004 | American International | 5–4 | 5–4 | 5th | | |
| 2005 | American International | 5–4 | 5–4 | 5th | | |
| 2006 | American International | 6–4 | 6–3 | 5th | | |
| 2007 | American International | 7–3 | 7–2 | T–2nd | | |
| 2008 | American International | 9–2 | 7–0 | 1st | L NCAA Division II First Round | 25 |
| 2009 | American International | 5–5 | 3–5 | 7th | | |
| 2010 | American International | 6–4 | 6–2 | T–1st | | |
| 2011 | American International | 6–4 | 5–3 | T–3rd | | |
| 2012 | American International | 7–3 | 7–1 | 2nd | | |
| 2013 | American International | 9–3 | 8–1 | T–1st | L NCAA Division II First Round | |
| 2014 | American International | 8–3 | 8–1 | 1st | | |
| 2015 | American International | 4–7 | 4–5 | 7th | | |
| 2016 | American International | 4–7 | 3–6 | 7th | | |
| 2017 | American International | 2–8 | 2–7 | T–8th | | |
| 2018 | American International | 1–8 | 1–8 | T–9th | | |
| 2019 | American International | 4–6 | 3–5 | 7th | | |
| American International: | | 151–118 | 129–72 | | | |
| Total: | | 151–118 | | | | |
National championship Conference title Conference division title or championship game berth
