= Marty Fine =

American football player and coach (born 1959)

Biographical details
- Born: July 30, 1959 (age 67)

Playing career
- ?: Union (NY)
- Position: Linebacker

Coaching career (HC unless noted)
- 1984: Western New Mexico (LB)
- 1985–1986: Sonoma State (DC)
- 1987–1988: Sonoma State
- 1989–1990: Naval Academy Prep (RI)
- 1991: Indiana State (RB)
- 1992: Indiana State (OL)
- 1993: Indiana State (QB/WR)
- 1994–1995: Indiana State (OC/OL)
- 1996: Colgate (ST)
- 1997–2001: Indiana (assistant)
- 2002–2003: Iowa State (OL/ST)
- 2004–2016: Bryant
- 2017–2019: New Mexico Highlands

Head coaching record
- Overall: 98–96 (college)
- Tournaments: 0–2 (NCAA D-II playoffs)

Accomplishments and honors

Championships
- 2 Northeast-10 (2006–2007)

Marty Fine (born July 30, 1959) is an American football coach. He was the head football coach at New Mexico Highlands University. Fine served as the head football coach at Sonoma State University from 1987 to 1988 and Bryant University from 2004 to 2016.

== Head coaching record ==
Year	Team	Overall	Conference	Standing	Bowl/playoffs
Sonoma State Cossacks (Northern California Athletic Conference) (1987–1988)
1987	Sonoma State	5–6	2–3	T–4th	
1988	Sonoma State	5–5	3–2	T–2nd	
Sonoma State:		10–11	5–5		
Bryant Bulldogs (Northeast-10 Conference) (2004–2007)
2004	Bryant	4–5	4–5	6th	
2005	Bryant	7–3	6–3	4th	
2006	Bryant	8–3	7–2	T–1st	L NCAA Division II First Round
2007	Bryant	8–3	8–1	T–1st	L NCAA Division II First Round
Bryant Bulldogs (NCAA Division I FCS independent) (2008)
2008	Bryant	7–4			
Bryant Bulldogs (Northeast Conference) (2009–2016)
2009	Bryant	5–6	4–4	T–5th	
2010	Bryant	7–4	4–4	3rd	
2011	Bryant	7–4	5–3	T–4th	
2012	Bryant	4–7	4–4	T–4th	
2013	Bryant	5–7	3–3	T–4th	
2014	Bryant	8–3	4–2	3rd	
2015	Bryant	5–6	3–3	T–3rd	
2016	Bryant	5–6	4–2	T–3rd	
Bryant:		80–61	56–36		
New Mexico Highlands (Rocky Mountain Athletic Conference) (2017–2019)
2017	New Mexico Highlands	2–9	1–9	T–10th	
2018	New Mexico Highlands	4–7	4–6	T–6th	
2019	New Mexico Highlands	2–8	2–8	T–9th	
New Mexico Highlands:		8–24	7–23		
Total:		98–96			
National championship Conference title Conference division title or championship game berth
