= Metropolitan Intercollegiate Conference =

Defunct NCAA Division III athletic conference

The Metropolitan Intercollegiate Conference was an American intercollegiate athletic conference that existed from 1972 to 1984. The league had members in the state of New York.

== Members ==
- The following is an incomplete list of the membership of the Metropolitan Intercollegiate Conference.

Institution	Location	Nickname	Founded	Joined	Left	Conference joined
Wagner College	Staten Island, New York	Seahawks	1883	1972	1977	D-III independent

== Football champions ==
- 1972 – C. W. Post
- 1973 – C. W. Post
- 1974 – C. W. Post
- 1975 – C. W. Post
- 1976 – C. W. Post
- 1977 – Fordham
- 1978 – Pace
- 1979 – Pace
- 1980 – Pace
- 1981 – St. John's
- 1982 – St. John's
- 1983 – St. John's
- 1984 – St. John's

== Yearly football standings ==
1972 Metropolitan Intercollegiate Conference football standings
	Conf.					Overall
Team	W		L		T	W		L		T
C. W. Post $	3	–	0	–	0	6	–	3	–	0
Wagner	2	–	1	–	0	7	–	3	–	0
Hofstra	1	–	2	–	0	5	–	6	–	0
Merchant Marine	0	–	3	–	0	5	–	4	–	0
Fordham *	0	–	0	–	0	5	–	5	–	0
$ – Conference champion; * – Did not complete for conference title

1973 Metropolitan Intercollegiate Conference football standings
	Conf.					Overall
Team	W		L		T	W		L		T
C. W. Post $	5	–	0	–	0	10	–	1	–	0
Hofstra	4	–	1	–	0	8	–	3	–	0
Fordham	2	–	2	–	0	6	–	4	–	0
Merchant Marine	1	–	2	–	0	5	–	5	–	0
Seton Hall	0	–	2	–	0	3	–	4	–	0
Saint Peter's	0	–	2	–	0	0	–	9	–	0
Wagner	0	–	3	–	0	4	–	5	–	0
$ – Conference champion

1974 Metropolitan Intercollegiate Conference football standings
	Conf.					Overall
Team	W		L		T	W		L		T
C. W. Post $	4	–	0	–	0	6	–	4	–	0
Merchant Marine	3	–	1	–	0	6	–	3	–	0
Seton Hall	2	–	1	–	0	7	–	2	–	0
Wagner	2	–	2	–	0	5	–	3	–	1
Fordham	0	–	3	–	1	3	–	5	–	1
Hofstra	0	–	4	–	1	1	–	9	–	1
$ – Conference champion

1975 Metropolitan Intercollegiate Conference football standings
	Conf.					Overall
Team	W		L		T	W		L		T
C. W. Post $	4	–	0	–	0	9	–	1	–	0
Merchant Marine	4	–	1	–	0	7	–	2	–	0
Wagner	3	–	2	–	0	6	–	2	–	1
Fordham	1	–	2	–	1	3	–	5	–	1
Hofstra	1	–	4	–	0	3	–	6	–	0
Seton Hall	0	–	4	–	1	2	–	7	–	1
$ – Conference champion

1976 Metropolitan Intercollegiate Conference football standings
	Conf.					Overall
Team	W		L		T	W		L		T
C. W. Post $	3	–	0	–	0	8	–	2	–	0
Merchant Marine	4	–	1	–	0	8	–	1	–	0
Hofstra	2	–	3	–	0	4	–	4	–	0
Seton Hall	1	–	2	–	1	3	–	5	–	2
Fordham	1	–	2	–	1	5	–	3	–	1
Wagner	1	–	4	–	0	2	–	7	–	1
$ – Conference champion

1977 Metropolitan Intercollegiate Conference football standings
	Conf.					Overall
Team	W		L		T	W		L		T
Fordham $	3	–	0	–	0	8	–	2	–	0
C. W. Post	3	–	0	–	0	5	–	3	–	1
Hofstra	3	–	2	–	0	6	–	3	–	0
Merchant Marine	1	–	2	–	0	3	–	6	–	0
Wagner	1	–	4	–	0	2	–	7	–	0
Seton Hall	0	–	3	–	0	3	–	5	–	0
$ – Conference champion

1978 Metropolitan Intercollegiate Conference football standings
	Conf.					Overall
Team	W		L		T	W		L		T
Pace $	5	–	0	–	0	6	–	2	–	0
Brooklyn	3	–	2	–	0	5	–	4	–	0
Iona	2	–	2	–	0	5	–	4	–	0
Saint Peter's	2	–	2	–	0	5	–	4	–	0
St. John's	2	–	3	–	0	5	–	5	–	0
Marist	0	–	5	–	0	1	–	8	–	0
$ – Conference champion

1979 Metropolitan Intercollegiate Conference football standings
	Conf.					Overall
Team	W		L		T	W		L		T
Pace $	5	–	0	–	0	7	–	1	–	1
St. John's	4	–	1	–	0	4	–	5	–	1
Iona	3	–	2	–	0	6	–	4	–	0
Marist	1	–	4	–	0	3	–	5	–	0
Saint Peter's	1	–	4	–	0	1	–	6	–	0
Brooklyn	1	–	4	–	0	1	–	8	–	0
$ – Conference champion

1980 Metropolitan Intercollegiate Conference football standings
	Conf.					Overall
Team	W		L		T	W		L		T
Pace $	5	–	0	–	0	6	–	3	–	0
Iona	3	–	1	–	1	6	–	4	–	1
Saint Peter's	3	–	1	–	1	4	–	4	–	1
Marist	2	–	3	–	0	2	–	7	–	0
St. John's	1	–	4	–	0	3	–	7	–	0
Brooklyn	0	–	5	–	0	1	–	9	–	0
$ – Conference champion

1981 Metropolitan Intercollegiate Conference football standings
	Conf.					Overall
Team	W		L		T	W		L		T
St. John's $	4	–	0	–	0	8	–	2	–	0
Pace	3	–	1	–	0	5	–	5	–	0
Brooklyn	2	–	2	–	0	4	–	6	–	0
Marist	1	–	3	–	0	2	–	7	–	0
Saint Peter's	0	–	4	–	0	1	–	8	–	0
$ – Conference champion

1982 Metropolitan Intercollegiate Conference football standings
	Conf.					Overall
Team	W		L		T	W		L		T
St. John's $	4	–	0	–	0	9	–	1	–	0
Pace	3	–	1	–	0	5	–	4	–	0
Marist	2	–	2	–	0	2	–	7	–	0
Brooklyn	1	–	3	–	0	3	–	7	–	0
Saint Peter's	0	–	4	–	0	1	–	8	–	0
$ – Conference champion

1983 Metropolitan Intercollegiate Conference football standings
	Conf.					Overall
Team	W		L		T	W		L		T
St. John's $	4	–	0	–	0	9	–	1	–	0
Marist	3	–	1	–	0	3	–	6	–	0
Pace	2	–	2	–	0	5	–	4	–	0
Saint Peter's	1	–	3	–	0	1	–	7	–	0
Brooklyn	0	–	4	–	0	0	–	9	–	0
$ – Conference champion

1984 Metropolitan Intercollegiate Conference football standings
	Conf.					Overall
Team	W		L		T	W		L		T
St. John's $	4	–	0	–	0	8	–	2	–	0
Pace	3	–	1	–	0	4	–	5	–	0
Marist	2	–	2	–	0	3	–	7	–	0
Brooklyn	1	–	3	–	0	3	–	8	–	0
Saint Peter's	0	–	4	–	0	0	–	10	–	0
$ – Conference champion; Saint Peter's cancelled the remainder of their season after their first game and forfeited those nine remaining games.

== See also ==
- List of defunct college football conferences
