= Bill Moge =

American sports coach (1911–2002)

William Moge
Biographical details
- Born: 1911; Arlington, Vermont, U.S.
- Died: January 18, 2002; Springfield, Massachusetts, U.S.

Playing career

Football
- 1935–1937: Providence

Football
- 1935–1936: Providence

Baseball
- c. 1937: Providence
- Positions: Halfback (football); Guard (basketball); Third baseman (baseball)

Coaching career (HC unless noted)

Football
- 1939–1940: American International (assistant)
- 1941–1942: American International
- 1943: American International (assistant)
- 1945–1949: Westfield HS (MA)
- 1950–1980: Chicopee HS (MA)
- 1965: Holyoke Bombers

Basketball
- 1941–1943: American International
- 1945–1949: Westfield HS (MA)

Baseball
- 1942: American International

Administrative career (AD unless noted)
- 1941–1945: American International

Head coaching record
- Overall: 7–3–2 (college football); 11–22 (college basketball); 2–6–1 (pro football)

William B. Moge (1911 – January 18, 2002) was an American football, basketball and baseball coach. He served as the head coach in all three sports at American International College during the early 1940s.

Moge was born in Arlington, Vermont. He graduated from Technical High School in Springfield, Massachusetts. He attended Providence College, where he played halfback in football, third base in baseball, and guard in basketball before graduating in the class of 1938. He served as the basketball and football coach at Westfield High School (WHS). His 1947 and 1948 WHS football team won the Western Massachusetts Class A title and defeated the Georgia Class A champions in the Peanut Bowl in Columbus, Georgia.

In 1950, Moge began his tenure as the head football coach at Chicopee High School. In 1958, he led the team past Holyoke High to win Chicopee's first AA conference title (20–0). In 1959, Moge coached against Holyoke star quarterback and future NFL player Archie Roberts, losing the matchup (36–6). In his last game as head coach in 1983, the football field at Szot Park was named in his honor on the morning of the game. He later served as the head football coach of the Holyoke Bombers of the Atlantic Coast Football League for part of one season in 1965.

In 1984, Moge was inducted into the Providence Friars athletic hall of fame. He died on January 18, 2002, at Baystate Medical Center in Springfield.

== Head coaching record ==
=== College football ===
Year	Team	Overall	Conference	Standing	Bowl/playoffs
American International Yellow Jackets (Independent) (1941–1942)
1941	American International	5–2			
1942	American International	2–1–2			
American International:		7–3–2			
Total:		7–3–2			
