= Alex Rotsko =

American football coach (born c. 1954)

Biographical details
- Born: c. 1954 (age 71–72); Topsfield, Massachusetts, U.S.
- Education: Springfield College (1975); Ithaca College

Playing career
- 1971–1974: Springfield
- Position: Wide receiver

Coaching career (HC unless noted)
- 1975–1977: Hamilton-Wenham HS (MA) (OB/DB)
- 1978: Ithaca (GA/LB)
- 1979: Ithaca (DL)
- 1980–1982: American International (DC)
- 1983–1992: American International
- 1993–2011: Longmeadow HS (MA)
- 2012–2025: Marshwood HS (ME)

Administrative career (AD unless noted)
- 2008–2012: Longmeadow HS (MA)

Head coaching record
- Overall: 52–46–3 (college); 289–74 (high school)

Alex Rotsko (born c. 1954) is a former American college football coach. He was the head football coach for American International College from 1983 to 1992, Longmeadow High School from 1993 to 2011, and Marshwood High School from 2012 to 2025. He also coached for Hamilton-Wenham Regional High School and Ithaca. He played college football for Springfield as a wide receiver.

== Head coaching record ==
=== College ===
Year	Team	Overall	Conference	Standing	Bowl/playoffs	D2^{#}
American International Yellow Jackets (NCAA Division II independent) (1983–1992)
1983	American International	4–7				
1984	American International	4–6				
1985	American International	8–2				14
1986	American International	6–4				
1987	American International	3–5–2				
1988	American International	5–5				
1989	American International	7–3				19
1990	American International	7–3				17
1991	American International	4–5–1				
1992	American International	4–6				
American International:		52–46–3				
Total:		52–46–3				

=== High school ===
Year	Team	Overall	Conference	Standing	Bowl/playoffs
Longmeadow Lancers () (1993–2011)
1993	Longmeadow	6-4			
1994	Longmeadow	3-7			
1995	Longmeadow	5-5			
1996	Longmeadow	8-3			
1997	Longmeadow	10-2			Super Bowl (W)
1998	Longmeadow	10-1			Super Bowl (W)
1999	Longmeadow	10-1			Super Bowl (W)
2000	Longmeadow	9-2			Super Bowl (L)
2001	Longmeadow	10-1			Super Bowl (L)
2002	Longmeadow	10-1			Super Bowl (W)
2003	Longmeadow	12-0			Super Bowl (W)
2004	Longmeadow	9–2	8–1	1st	Super Bowl (L)
2005	Longmeadow	12–0	8–0	1st	Super Bowl (W)
2006	Longmeadow	12–0	8–0	1st	Super Bowl (W)
2007	Longmeadow	11–0	7–0	1st	Super Bowl (W)
2008	Longmeadow	12–1	7–0	1st	Super Bowl (W)
2009	Longmeadow	10–3	7–0	1st	Super Bowl (L)
2010	Longmeadow	12–1	7–0	1st	Super Bowl (W)
2011	Longmeadow	12–2	6–1	2nd	Super Bowl (W)
Longmeadow:		183–35			
Marshwood Hawks () (2012–present)
2012	Marshwood	10–2			State Championship (L)
2013	Marshwood	7–3	4–2	3rd	
2014	Marshwood	11–0	6–0	1st	State Championship (W)
2015	Marshwood	9–2	4–2	5th	State Championship (W)
2016	Marshwood	6–4	5–3	6th	
2017	Marshwood	12–0	6–0	1st	State Championship (W)
2018	Marshwood	11–1	5–1	2nd	State Championship (W)
2019	Marshwood	11–1	7–0	1st	State Championship (W)
2020	No team - Covid				
2021	Marshwood	9–3	6–2	3rd	State Championship (W)
2022	Marshwood	2–7	1–5	7th	
2023	Marshwood	6–6	4–2	2nd	
2024	Marshwood	6–6	4–4	4th	
2025	Marshwood	6–4	4–2	3rd	
Marshwood:		106–39	56–23		
Total:		289–74			
National championship Conference title Conference division title or championship game berth
