= Milt Piepul =

American football player, coach, athletics administrator (1918–1984)

- Pielpul carrying the ball in 1939

No. 38, 71
- Position: Fullback

Personal information
- Born: September 14, 1918; Springfield, Massachusetts, U.S.
- Died: March 19, 1994 (aged 75); Northampton, Massachusetts, U.S.
- Listed height: 6 ft 1 in (1.85 m)
- Listed weight: 215 lb (98 kg)

Career information
- High school: Enfield (Enfield, Connecticut)
- College: Notre Dame
- NFL draft: 1941: 11th round, 95th overall pick

Career history

Playing
- Detroit Lions (1941)

Coaching
- American International (1971–1975) Head coach

Awards and highlights
- Second-team All-American (1939)

Career NFL statistics
- Rushing yards: 56
- Rushing average: 2.8
- Passing yards: 23
- Stats at Pro Football Reference

Milton John Piepul (September 14, 1918 – March 19, 1994) was an American professional football player, coach, and college athletics administrator. He played college football for the Notre Dame Fighting Irish football team. He was selected as a second-team fullback on the 1939 College Football All-America Team and a third-team player on the 1940 team. He was drafted by the Detroit Lions with the 95th pick in the 1941 NFL draft and played for the Lions during the 1941 NFL season. He played just the one season for the Lions, appearing in 12 games while starting twice. Piepul served as the head football coach at American International College from 1971 to 1975 and as the school's athletic director from 1971 to 1986. Previously he was an assistant football coach at Dartmouth College, Brown University, and the College of the Holy Cross.

Piepul died on March 19, 1994, at Cooley Dickinson Hospital in Northampton, Massachusetts.

== Head coaching record ==
=== College football ===
Year	Team	Overall	Conference	Standing	Bowl/playoffs
American International Yellow Jackets (NCAA College Division independent) (1971–1972)
1971	American International	4–5			
1972	American International	5–4			
American International Yellow Jackets (NCAA Division II independent) (1973–1975)
1973	American International	5–4			
1974	American International	4–5			
1975	American International	8–1			
American International:		26–19			
Total:		26–19			
