= Dan Chipka =

American football coach (born 1988)

Current position
- Title: Head coach
- Team: American International
- Conference: NE-10
- Record: 6–15

Biographical details
- Born: February 28, 1988 (age 38); Waterville, Ohio, U.S.
- Education: Bluffton University (2010)

Playing career
- 2006–2009: Bluffton
- Position: Wide receiver

Coaching career (HC unless noted)
- 2010–2013: Bowsher HS (OH) (OC)
- 2014–2016: Waite HS (OH)
- 2017–2020: St. Francis de Sales HS (OH)
- 2021: Wingate (ST/assistant WR)
- 2022 (spring): Wingate (ST/TE/FB)
- 2022 (spring): Lincoln (MO) (OC/QB)
- 2022: American International (TE/FB)
- 2023: American International (OC/QB)
- 2024–present: American International

Head coaching record
- Overall: 6–15 (college); 33–38 (high school)

Accomplishments and honors

Championships
- 2014 Toledo City League

Daniel James Chipka (born February 28, 1988) is an American college football coach. He is the head football coach for American International College, a position he has held since 2024. He was the head football coach for Waite High School from 2014 to 2016 and St. Francis de Sales School from 2017 to 2020. He also coached for Bowsher High School, Wingate, and Lincoln (MO). He played college football for Bluffton as a wide receiver.

== Head coaching record ==
=== College ===
Year	Team	Overall	Conference	Standing	Bowl/playoffs
American International Yellow Jackets (Northeast-10 Conference) (2024–present)
2024	American International	4–7	3–5	T–6th	
2025	American International	2–8	2–5	6th	
American International:		6–15	5–10		
Total:		6–15			

=== High school ===
Year	Team	Overall	Conference	Standing	Bowl/playoffs
Waite Indians (Toledo City League) (2014–2016)
2014	Waite	5–5	4–1	T–1st	
2015	Waite	6–5	4–1	2nd	
2016	Waite	4–6	1–4	5th	
Waite:		15–16	9–6		
St. Francis de Sales Knights (Three Rivers Athletic Conference) (2017–2020)
2017	St. Francis de Sales	2–8	1–6	8th	
2018	St. Francis de Sales	4–6	2–5	6th	
2019	St. Francis de Sales	6–5	4–3	4th	OHSAA Playoffs 1st round
2020	St. Francis de Sales	6–3	4–2	4th	OHSAA Playoffs (2 wins)
St. Francis de Sales:		18–22	11–16		
Total:		33–38			
