= Bob Burke =

American football player and coach (born 1942)

Biographical details
- Born: c. 1942 (age 83–84)

Playing career
- 1961–1964: UMass
- 1965: Holyoke Bombers

Coaching career (HC unless noted)
- 1966–1967: Cathedral HS (MA)
- 1968–1975: American International (DC/line)
- 1976–1982: American International
- 2011: Port Charlotte HS (FL) (assistant)

Administrative career (AD unless noted)
- 1982–1986: American International (assoc. AD)
- 1986–2006: American International
- 1989–1995: NE-10 (commissioner)
- 1997–1998: NE-10 (commissioner)

Head coaching record
- Overall: 36–28–2 (college); 11–6–1

Robert E. Burke (born 1942) is a retired American football coach. He served as the head football coach at American International College in Springfield, Massachusetts from 1976 to 1982.

Burke played college football at the University of Massachusetts in Amherst, Massachusetts.

== Head coaching record ==
=== College ===
Year	Team	Overall	Conference	Standing	Bowl/playoffs	AP^{#}
American International Yellow Jackets (NCAA Division II independent) (1976–1982)
1976	American International	6–3				
1977	American International	5–4–1				
1978	American International	6–2–1				9
1979	American International	6–3				
1980	American International	8–2				9
1981	American International	1–8				
1982	American International	4–6				
American International:		36–28–2				
Total:		36–28–2				

=== High school ===
Year	Team	Overall	Conference	Standing	Bowl/playoffs
Cathedral Panthers () (1966–1967)
1966	Cathedral	3–5–1			
1967	Cathedral	8–1		2nd	
Cathedral:		11–6–1			
Total:		11–6–1			
