= Tom Radulski =

American football player and coach (born 1955)

Current position
- Title: Defensive line coach
- Team: Bates
- Conference: NESCAC

Biographical details
- Born: July 24, 1955 (age 71); Topsham, Maine, U.S.

Playing career
- 1974–1977: New Hampshire

Coaching career (HC unless noted)
- 1980: Allegheny (WR)
- 1981: Allegheny (LB)
- 1982: New Hampshire (OLB)
- 1983: New Hampshire (WR)
- 1984: Hamilton (DC)
- 1985: Colby (DC)
- 1986–1988: Allegheny (DC)
- 1989–1993: Columbia (DC)
- 1993–1995: UMass Lowell
- 1997–1999: Sacred Heart
- 2000–2010: Bowdoin (DC)
- 2011–2013: Holy Cross (LB)
- 2014–2017: Holy Cross (DL)
- 2017–2019: Hebron Academy (ME)
- 2020–present: Bates (DL)

Head coaching record
- Overall: 9–47 (college); 7–16–1 (high school)

Tom Radulski (born July 24, 1955) is an American college football coach and former player. He was the second head football coach at Sacred Heart University, serving from 1997 until he was fired midway thought the 1999 season, and compiling a record of 4–22. Radulski's first season was also the Pioneers' first in NCAA Division I-AA competition. In 1999, the Pioneers left the Eastern Football Conference to join the Northeast Conference.

Radulski had previously been the first head coach in the University of Massachusetts Lowell's football program's history from 1993 to 1995. He was an assistant coach at Colby College, the University of New Hampshire, Columbia University, Hamilton College, College of the Holy Cross, and Allegheny College.

== Head coaching record ==
=== College ===
Year	Team	Overall	Conference	Standing	Bowl/playoffs
UMass Lowell River Hawks (Freedom Football Conference) (1993–1995)
1993	UMass Lowell	5–5	2–3	T–5th	
1994	UMass Lowell	0–10	0–5	8th	
1995	UMass Lowell	0–10	0–5	9th	
UMass Lowell:		5–25	2–13		
Sacred Heart Pioneers (Eastern Football Conference) (1997)
1997	Sacred Heart	1–9	0–5		
Sacred Heart Pioneers (Northeast Conference) (1998–1999)
1998	Sacred Heart	2–8	1–4	5th	
1999	Sacred Heart	1–5 (Note: Radulski was the head coach for first six games of the 1999 season, leading the Pioneers to a record of 1–5 with a conference mark of 0–3 before he was fired. Walt Czekaj was named interim head coach and served for the final five games of the season. Sacred Heart finished the year with an overall record of 2–9, placing eighth in the conference with a mark of 0–7.)	0–3		
Sacred Heart:		4–22	1–12		
Total:		9–47			

=== High school ===
Year	Team	Overall	Conference	Standing	Bowl/playoffs
Hebron Academy Lumberjacks () (2017–2019)
2017	Hebron Academy	2–5	0–4	5th	
2018	Hebron Academy	0–9–1	0–6–1	8th	
2019	Hebron Academy	5–2	4–1	1st	
Hebron Academy:		7–16–1	4–15–1		
Total:		7–16–1			
National championship Conference title Conference division title or championship game berth
