= Holyoke Bombers =

Defunct American football team

- Founded: 1965
- Folded: 1965
- League: Atlantic Coast Football League
- Based in: Holyoke, Massachusetts
- Arena: Mackenzie Stadium

The Holyoke Bombers were a professional American football team based in Holyoke, Massachusetts. They played one season as a member of the Atlantic Coast Football League in 1965. The Bombers finished with a 2–9–1 record in its only ACFL season.

== Background ==
The Bombers were coached by head coach Johnny Dell Isola for the first three games of the season before being replaced by Bill Moge for the remainder of the 1965 season. The Bombers' most prominent players included Jerry Whelchel, Ronny Holiday, and Jack Janiszewski.

=== Roster ===
- Coaches: Johnny Dell Isola, Bill Moge
- Players: Bob Burke
