= Walt Czekaj =

American football player and coach (1936–2008)

Biographical details
- Born: April 21, 1936; New York, New York, U.S.
- Died: October 13, 2008 (aged 72); Branford, Connecticut, U.S.

Playing career
- 1954–1956: Bridgeport
- Positions: Quarterback, linebacker

Coaching career (HC unless noted)
- 1962–1967: Brien McMahon HS (CT) (assistant)
- 1968–?: Norwalk CC
- 1968–1976: Trumbull HS (CT) (assistant)
- 1977–1982: Norwalk HS (CT)
- 1983–1998: Stratford HS (CT)
- 1999: Sacred Heart (assistant / interim HC)

Head coaching record
- Overall: 1–4 (college)

Walter A. Czekaj (April 21, 1936 – October 13, 2008) was an American football coach. He served as the interim head football coach at Sacred Heart University for the final five games of the 1999 season following the firing of Tom Radulski.

Czekaj was born on April 21, 1936, in New York City. He died on October 13, 2008, at The Connecticut Hospice in Branford, Connecticut, after having suffered a stroke earlier that month.

== Head coaching record ==
=== College ===
Year	Team	Overall	Conference	Standing	Bowl/playoffs
Sacred Heart Pioneers (Northeast Conference) (1999)
1999	Sacred Heart	1–4 (Note: Tom Radulski was the head coach for first six games of the 1999 season, leading the Pioneers to a record of 1–5 overall and 0–3 in conference games before he was fired. Czekaj was named interim head coach and served for the final five games of the season. Sacred Heart finished the year with an overall record of 2–9 and a conference mark of 0–7.)	0–4	8th	
Sacred Heart:		1–4	0–4		
Total:		1–4			
