= Henry A. Butova =

American sports coach

Biographical details
- Born: c. 1928
- Died: February 28, 1965 (aged 46); Springfield, Massachusetts, U.S.

Playing career

Football
- 1946: American International

Coaching career (HC unless noted)

Football
- 1948: American International
- 1952–1955: American International

Basketball
- 1948–1949: American International

Baseball
- 1947–1964: American International

Head coaching record
- Overall: 17–17–3 (football); 4–19 (basketball); 175–144–3 (baseball)

Henry A. Butova c. 1928 – February 28, 1965) was an American football, basketball and baseball coach. He served as the head football coach at American International College in Springfield, Massachusetts in 1948 and from 1952 to 1955. He was also the head basketball coach at American International in 1948—49, tallying a mark of 4–19, and the school's head baseball coach from 1947 to 1964, amassing a record of 175–144–3.

== Head coaching record ==
=== Football ===
| Year | Team | Overall | Conference | Standing | Bowl/playoffs |
|---|---|---|---|---|---|
American International Yellow Jackets (Independent) (1948)
| 1948 | American International | 2–6–1 | | | |
American International Yellow Jackets (Independent) (1952–1955)
| 1952 | American International | 5–2 | | | |
| 1953 | American International | 5–1–1 | | | |
| 1954 | American International | 2–4–1 | | | |
| 1955 | American International | 3–4 | | | |
| American International: | | 17–17–3 | | | |
| Total: | | 17–17–3 | | | |
