= Eastern Football Conference (1997–2000) =

NCAA Division II intercollegiate athletic football conference

The Eastern Football Conference (EFC) was an NCAA Division II intercollegiate athletic football conference that existed from 1997 to 2000 and was composed of member schools from the Northeastern United States. During its entire existence, its membership was geographically divided into two separate divisions: the Atlantic Division and the Bay State/Central Division (its name was changed after the 1998 season). A conference championship game between the winners of the two divisions was held annually. Former members are currently scattered between the Colonial Athletic Association (Division I FCS) and the Northeast-10 Conference (Division II), the latter of which was founded in 2001.

== Members ==
Institution	Location	Founded	Nickname	Joined	Left	Current conference
American International College	Springfield, Massachusetts	1885	Yellow Jackets	1997	2000	Northeast-10

== Champions ==
Season	Atlantic Division	Bay State Division
1997	**Albany** (8–0)	American International (8–0)
1998	**Albany** (7–1)	American International (7–2)
Season	Atlantic Division	Central Division
1999	C. W. Post (7–1)	**American International** (8–1)
2000	C. W. Post (7–1)	**American International** (8–1

- Conference championship game winner listed in **bold**.

== Yearly standings ==
1997 Eastern Football Conference standings
	Conf.			Overall
Team	W		L	W		L
Atlantic Division
Albany xy$	8	–	0	11	–	1
Southern Connecticut	6	–	2	7	–	4
C. W. Post	5	–	3	6	–	4
Stony Brook	4	–	4	4	–	6
Pace	3	–	4	4	–	5
Sacred Heart	1	–	7	1	–	9
Bay State Division
American International xy	8	–	0	8	–	4
Bentley	5	–	3	6	–	3
Stonehill	3	–	5	4	–	6
Merrimack	3	–	5	3	–	6
UMass Lowell	1	–	7	2	–	8
Assumption	0	–	7	0	–	9
Championship: **Albany 27**, American International 20
$ – Conference champion; x – Division champion/co-champions; y – Championship game participant

1998 Eastern Football Conference standings
	Conf.			Overall
Team	W		L	W		L
Atlantic Division
Albany xy$	7	–	1	10	–	1
Southern Connecticut	6	–	2	8	–	2
C. W. Post	6	–	2	7	–	3
Pace	3	–	5	5	–	5
Stony Brook	3	–	5	3	–	6
Bay State Division
Bentley x	7	–	2	8	–	2
American International xy	7	–	2	7	–	4
Merrimack	2	–	6	3	–	6
Stonehill	2	–	6	2	–	8
UMass Lowell	2	–	6	2	–	8
Assumption	0	–	8	0	–	9
Championship: **Albany 25**, American International 24
$ – Conference champion; x – Division champion/co-champions; y – Championship game participant

1999 Eastern Football Conference standings
	Conf.			Overall
Team	W		L	W		L
Atlantic Division
C. W. Post xy	7	–	1	9	–	2
Southern Connecticut	6	–	2	7	–	3
Merrimack	6	–	3	7	–	3
Saint Anselm	4	–	4	4	–	5
UMass Lowell	3	–	6	3	–	7
Central Division
American International xy$	8	–	1	10	–	2
Pace	5	–	3	6	–	4
Bryant	4	–	4	5	–	4
Bentley	3	–	6	4	–	7
Assumption	1	–	7	3	–	7
Stonehill	0	–	10	0	–	10
Championship: **American International 41**, C. W. Post 20
$ – Conference champion; x – Division champion/co-champions; y – Championship game participant

2000 Eastern Football Conference standings
	Conf.			Overall
Team	W		L	W		L
Atlantic Division
C. W. Post xy	7	–	1	8	–	2
Saint Anselm	5	–	3	6	–	4
Southern Connecticut	5	–	3	5	–	5
Merrimack	4	–	5	4	–	6
UMass Lowell	2	–	7	2	–	8
Central Division
American International xy$	8	–	1	9	–	3
Pace	4	–	4	4	–	6
Bentley	4	–	5	5	–	6
Assumption	3	–	5	5	–	6
Bryant	3	–	5	4	–	6
Stonehill	2	–	8	2	–	8
Championship: **American International 20**, C. W. Post 10
$ – Conference champion; x – Division champion/co-champions; y – Championship game participant

== See also ==
- List of defunct college football conferences
