= UMass Lowell River Hawks football =

College football team

- First season: 1980; 46 years ago
- Last season: 2002; 24 years ago
- Athletic director: Dana Skinner
- Head coach: Wally Dembowski; 2nd season, 4–17 (.190)
- Location: Lowell, Massachusetts
- Stadium: Cushing Field Complex (capacity: 2,000)
- NCAA division: Division II
- Conference: NE-10
- Colors: Blue, white, and red
- All-time record: 87–125–1 (.411)

Conference championships
- 1

Conference division championships
- 2
- Mascot: River Hawks

The UMass Lowell River Hawks football team represented the University of Massachusetts Lowell in college football at the NCAA Division II level. The River Hawks were members of the Northeast-10 Conference (NE-10), having fielded its team in the NE-10 from 2001 to 2002. The River Hawks played their home games at the Cushing Field Complex in Lowell, Massachusetts.

Their last head coach was Wally Dembowski, who took over the position from 2001 to 2002.

== Conference affiliations ==
- Club team (1980)
- Independent (1981–1986)
- New England Football Conference (1987–1991)
- Freedom Football Conference (1992–1995)
- Eastern Collegiate Football Conference (1996)
- Eastern Football Conference (1997–2000)
- Northeast-10 Conference (2001–2002)

== List of head coaches ==
=== Key ===
Key to symbols in coaches list
General		Overall		Conference		Postseason (Note: Although the first Rose Bowl Game was played in 1902, it has been continuously played since the 1916 game, and is recognized as the oldest bowl game by the NCAA. "—" indicates any season prior to 1916 when postseason games were not played.)	
No.	Order of coaches (Note: A running total of the number of head coaches, with coaches who served separate tenures being counted only once. Interim head coaches are represented with "Int" and are not counted in the running total. "—" indicates the team played but either without a coach or no coach is on record. "X" indicates an interim year without play.)	GC	Games coached	CW	Conference wins	PW	Postseason wins
DC	Division championships	OW	Overall wins	CL	Conference losses	PL	Postseason losses
CC	Conference championships	OL	Overall losses	CT	Conference ties	PT	Postseason ties
NC	National championships	OT	Overall ties (Note: Overtime rules in college football were introduced in 1996, making ties impossible in the period since.)	C%	Conference winning percentage		
†	Elected to the College Football Hall of Fame	O%	Overall winning percentage (Note: When computing the win–loss percentage, a tie counts as half a win and half a loss.)				

=== Coaches ===
List of head football coaches showing season(s) coached, overall records, conference records, postseason records, championships and selected awards
No.	Name	Season(s)	GC	OW	OL	OT	O%	CW	CL	CT	C%	PW	PL	PT	DC	CC	NC	Awards
1	John Perreault	1980–1985	47	18	29	0	0.383	–	–	–	–	–	–	–	–	–	–	–
2	Dennis Scannell	1986–1992	65	45	19	1	0.700	23	7	0	0.767	–	–	–	2	1	–	–
3	Tom Radulski	1993–1995	30	5	25	0	0.167	2	13	0	0.133	–	–	–	–	–	–	–
4	Sandy Ruggles	1996–2000	50	15	35	0	0.300	12	30	0	0.286	–	–	–	–	–	–	–
5	Wally Dembowski	2001–2002	21	4	17	0	0.190	4	16	0	0.200	–	–	–	–	–	–	–

== Year-by-year results ==
National champions	Conference champions	Bowl game berth	Playoff berth

Season	Year	Head coach	Association	Division	Conference	Record							Postseason	Final ranking
Season	Year	Head coach	Association	Division	Conference	Overall			Conference				Postseason	Final ranking
Season	Year	Head coach	Association	Division	Conference	Win	Loss	Tie	Finish	Win	Loss	Tie	Postseason	Final ranking
Lowell Chiefs
1980	1980	John Perreault	Club team											
1981	1981	John Perreault	NCAA	Division III	Independent	4	5	0					—	—
1982	1982	John Perreault	NCAA	Division III	Independent	2	8	0					—	—
1983	1983	John Perreault	NCAA	Division III	Independent	4	5	0					—	—
1984	1984	John Perreault	NCAA	Division III	Independent	5	4	0					—	—
1985	1985	John Perreault	NCAA	Division III	Independent	3	7	0					—	—
1986	1986	Dennis Scannell	NCAA	Division III	Independent	2	7	0					—	—
1987	1987	Dennis Scannell	NCAA	Division III	NEFC	4	4	0	4th (North)	2	2	0	—	—
1988	1988	Dennis Scannell	NCAA	Division III	NEFC	8	1	0	2nd (North)	5	1	0	—	—
1989	1989	Dennis Scannell	NCAA	Division III	NEFC	9	1	0	1st (North)	5	0	0	L conference championship	—
1990	1990	Dennis Scannell	NCAA	Division III	NEFC	8	1	0	2nd (North)	4	1	0	—	—
UMass Lowell River Hawks
1991	1991	Dennis Scannell	NCAA	Division III	NEFC	10	1	0	1st (North)	5	0	0	W conference championship	—
1992	1992	Dennis Scannell	NCAA	Division III	FFC	4	4	1	4th	2	3	1	—	—
1993	1993	Tom Radulski	NCAA	Division III	FFC	5	5	0	T–5th	2	3	0	—	—
1994	1994	Tom Radulski	NCAA	Division III	FFC	0	10	0	8th	0	5	0	—	—
1995	1995	Tom Radulski	NCAA	Division III	FFC	0	10	0	9th	0	5	0	—	—
1996	1996	Sandy Ruggles	NCAA	Division III	ECFC	6	4	0	6th	4	4	0	—	—
1997	1997	Sandy Ruggles	NCAA	Division II	EFC	2	8	0	5th (Bay State)	1	7	0	—	—
1998	1998	Sandy Ruggles	NCAA	Division II	EFC	2	8	0	T–3rd (Bay State)	2	6	0	—	—
1999	1999	Sandy Ruggles	NCAA	Division II	EFC	3	7	0	5th (Atlantic)	3	6	0	—	—
2000	2000	Sandy Ruggles	NCAA	Division II	EFC	2	8	0	5th (Atlantic)	2	7	0	—	—
2001	2001	Wally Dembowski	NCAA	Division II	NE-10	1	9	0	10th	1	9	0	—	—
2002	2002	Wally Dembowski	NCAA	Division II	NE-10	3	8	0	T–8th	3	7	0	—	—
