= LIU Sharks football =

College football team representing Long Island University

2026 LIU Sharks football team
- First season: 1928; 98 years ago (Note: The LIU Brooklyn Blackbirds and LIU Post Pioneers merged into and began competing as the Sharks in the 2019 season; 7 years ago.)
- Athletic director: Elliott Charles
- Head coach: Ron Cooper; 5th season, 23–35 (.397)
- Location: Brookville, New York
- Stadium: Bethpage Federal Credit Union Stadium (capacity: 6,000)
- Conference: NEC
- Colors: Blue and gold
- All-time record: 443–297–6 (.598)
- Bowl record: 0–1 (.000)

Conference championships
- MIC: 1972, 1973, 1974, 1975, 1976 LFC: 1988, 1990 NE10: 2001, 2002, 2004, 2005, 2006, 2014, 2016, 2018 NEC: 2026

Division championships
- EFC Atlantic: 1999, 2000 PSAC East: 2011
- Website: www.liuathletics.com

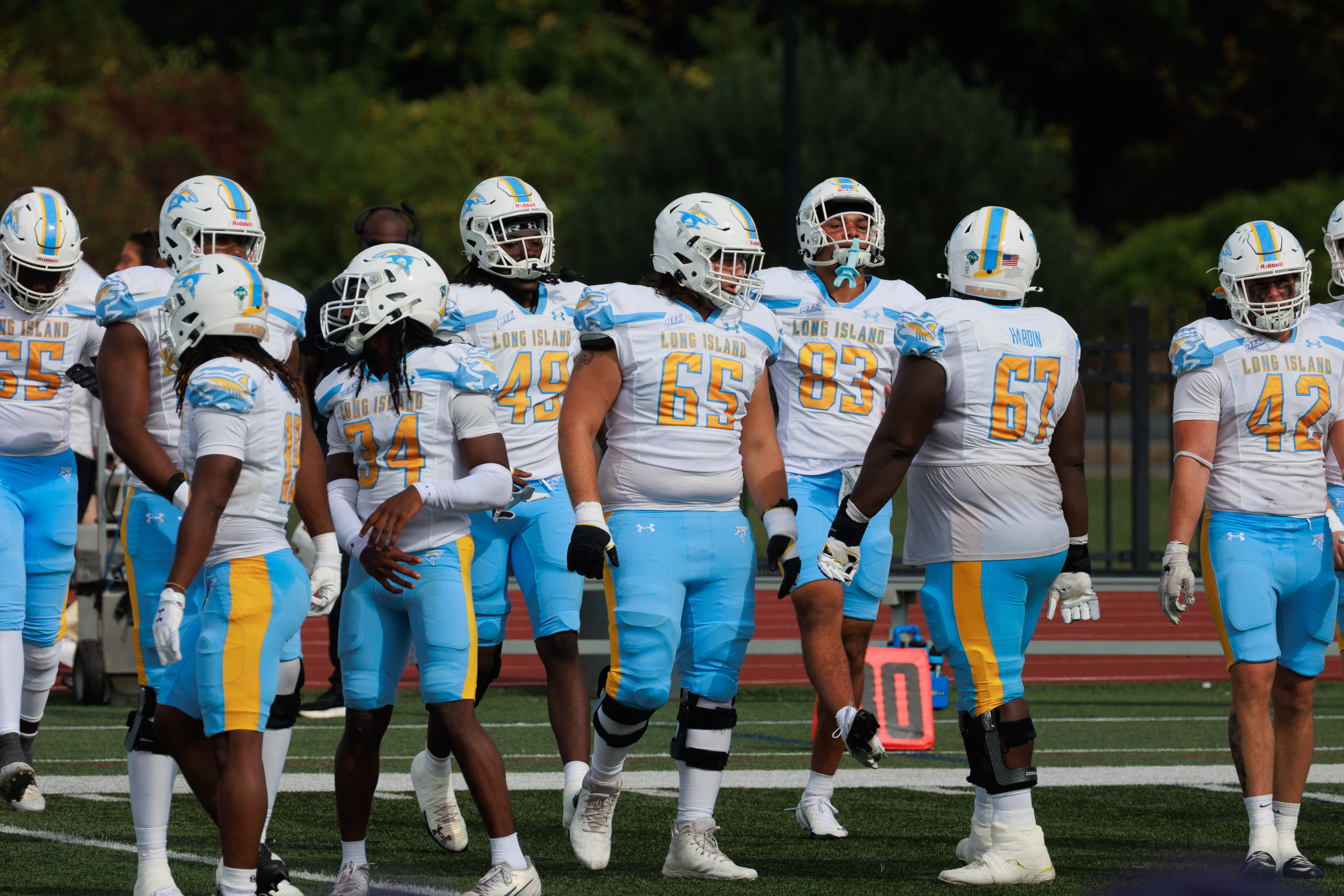
Sharks players in 2025

The LIU Sharks football program represents Long Island University in college football at the NCAA Division I Football Championship Subdivision (formerly Division I-AA) level. The Sharks are members of the Northeast Conference and play their home games in the 6,000-seat Bethpage Federal Credit Union Stadium.

== History ==
=== Long Island University Blackbirds ===
College football was first played at Long Island University's Brooklyn campus for six seasons from the late 1920s to 1940 when the program was suspended "until the world situation stabilized." Under head coach Herbert Raubenheimer, who also coached the LIU Brooklyn Blackbirds men's basketball, the team won their opening game on September 29, 1928 against Rider. Clair Bee took over head coaching duties in the 1931 season before the program was suspended during the heart of the Great Depression. Bee remained at the university, coaching basketball and returned to the gridiron to coach the team from 1939 to 1940. After playing at several local venues in the early seasons, the Blackbirds called Ebbets Field home for the 1939 and 1940 seasons. Over the six pre-war seasons the Blackbirds went 9–17–1.

The LIU Post Pioneers football program (previously known as the C.W. Post Pioneers) represented the C.W. Post Campus (later LIU Post) of Long Island University in college football at the NCAA Division II level through the 2018 season. The program was discontinued as an independent entity following the 2018–19 academic year when Long Island University unified its athletic programs from the Brooklyn and Brookville campuses into the LIU Sharks.

In 1951, Long Island University purchased the C.W. Post estate to develop a suburban campus in Brookville, New York, amid post-war suburban expansion. The university reinstated the football program in 1957 on the new campus, with the Pioneers joining the sport offerings at C.W. Post College that season.

The program competed in various conferences over the decades, including the Metropolitan Intercollegiate Conference (MIC) in the 1970s (winning five championships), the Liberty Football Conference (1985–1992), the Eastern Football Conference (EFC), a stint in the Pennsylvania State Athletic Conference (PSAC, 2008–2012), and most recently as an affiliate member of the Northeast-10 Conference (NE10) for football while other sports were in the East Coast Conference.

Under long-time head coach Bryan Collins (head coach from 1998 to 2018), the Pioneers achieved significant success, particularly in the 2000s and 2010s. Collins led the team to at least a share of nine conference titles (including multiple in the EFC and NE10), three NCAA Division II playoff appearances, and a program-best advancement to the NCAA Division II quarterfinals in 2005. The team posted multiple 11-win seasons (e.g., 11–1 in 2001 and 2002) and earned recognition for strong defense and high-powered offenses.

Notable players from the Pioneers era include quarterback Perry Klein, who transferred to C.W. Post in 1993 after playing at California and set multiple NCAA Division II records that season: 3,757 passing yards, 4,025 total offense yards, 614 passing yards in a single game, and 38 touchdowns overall. Klein was named Division II Player of the Year. Other standouts included running back Ian Smart (over 2,000 rushing yards in seasons 2001 and 2002) and defensive players who contributed to conference-leading units.

In their final season as the LIU Post Pioneers (2018), the team went undefeated in the regular season (10–0), won the Northeast-10 Conference championship with a thrilling 17–13 victory over New Haven, reached the NCAA Division II Playoffs (losing in the first round to Slippery Rock), finished ranked No. 21 in the Division II Coaches' Poll, and were awarded the 2019 Division II Lambert Cup by the Eastern College Athletic Conference (ECAC) and Metropolitan New York Football Writers as the top Division II team in the East.

The Pioneers' overall historical success included 18 conference championships (14 outright and 4 shared) across various leagues.

=== LIU Sharks (2019–present) ===
On October 3, 2018, Long Island University announced the unification of its Brooklyn (LIU Brooklyn Blackbirds) and Brookville (LIU Post Pioneers) athletic programs into a single NCAA Division I program, effective for the 2019–20 academic year. The new nickname, Sharks, was announced on May 15, 2019.

As part of the merger, the football program (previously NCAA Division II) jumped directly to the FCS level without a transition period, inheriting the Northeast Conference membership from the Brooklyn campus. The Sharks finished winless (0–10) in their inaugural FCS season in 2019.

Tragedy struck shortly after the 2019 season when starting quarterback Clay Beathard was stabbed to death in Nashville, Tennessee, on December 21, 2019.

The program has since shown improvement under head coach Ron Cooper, who was hired in December 2021. The team competes in Northeast Conference play and has scheduled occasional games against FBS opponents.

== First FBS win ==
LIU Sharks	Eastern Michigan Eagles
(0–1)	(0–1)
28	23
Head coach: Ron Cooper	Head coach: Chris Creighton
	1	2	3	4	Total
LIU	7	7	0	14	28
Eastern Michigan	3	7	0	13	23
- Date: September 6, 2025
- Season: 2025
- Stadium: Rynearson Stadium
- Location: Ypsilanti, MI
- Favorite: Eastern Michigan by 22.5

In the 2025 season, the LIU Sharks achieved a major milestone by recording their first-ever victory over a FBS opponent. On September 6, 2025, the Sharks upset the Eastern Michigan Eagles 28–23 on the road at Rynearson Stadium in Ypsilanti, Michigan.

The win came one week after a 55–0 season-opening loss at Florida (an SEC FBS team) on August 30, 2025. Entering as 22.5-point underdogs, the Sharks never trailed against the Eastern Michigan Eagles (a Mid-American Conference FBS program). Redshirt junior quarterbacks Luca Stanzani and Ethan Greenwood each rushed for two touchdowns, with Greenwood opening the scoring on a 65-yard run on LIU's first possession. The Sharks amassed 479 yards of total offense (including 231 rushing yards), held a significant time-of-possession advantage (37:53 to 22:07), committed no turnovers, and were penalized only three times.

The victory marked a historic moment for the program, which had previously gone 0–9 (or 0–8 in some counts) against FBS opponents since transitioning to Division I FCS in 2019. The Sharks were subsequently named Stats Perform FCS National Team of the Week.

As of January 2026, this remains the program's only FBS victory. LIU commemorated the achievement with limited-edition framed tickets signed by Coach Cooper.

== Affiliations ==
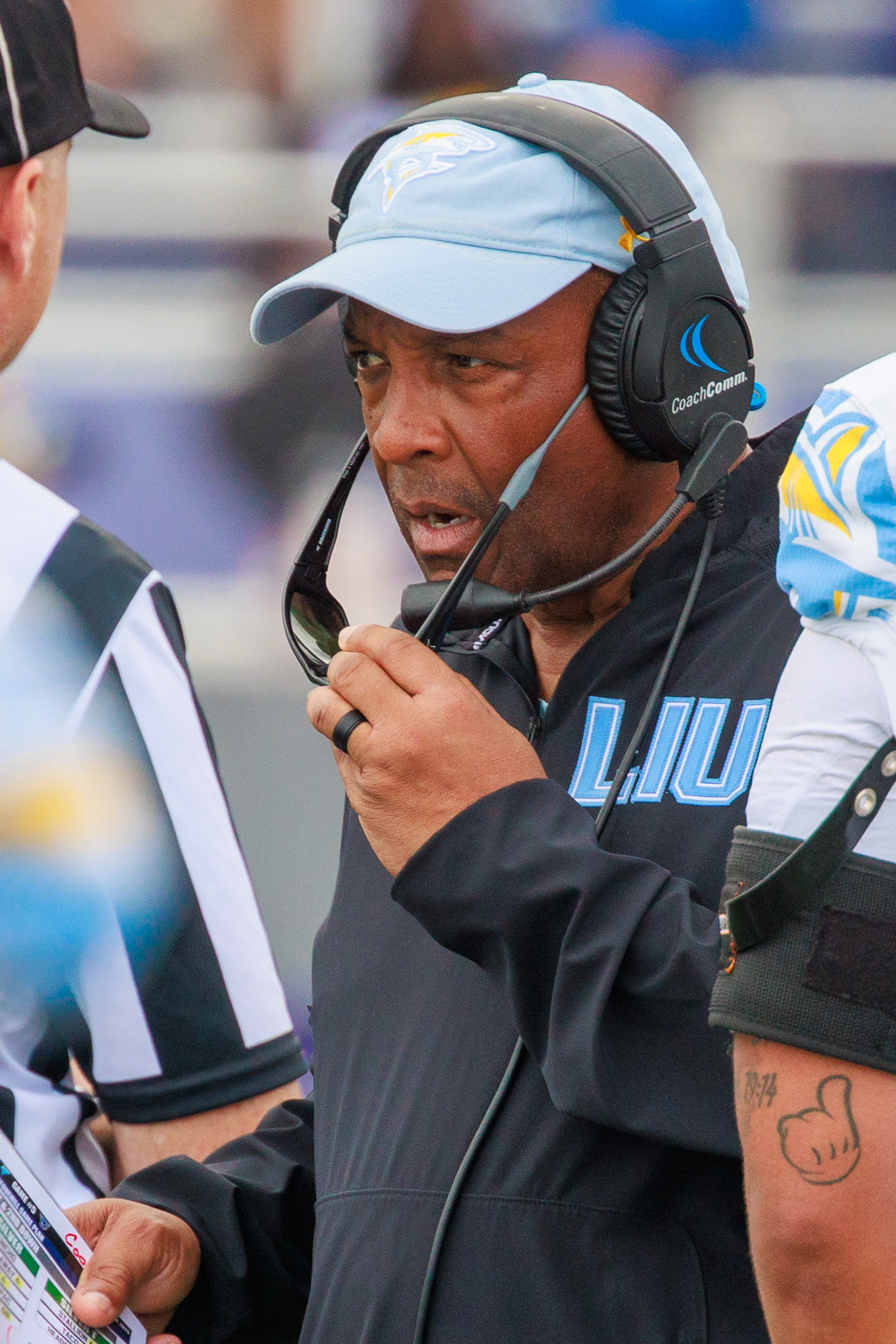
Coach Ron Cooper

=== Classifications ===
Seasons	Division
1928–1931	Independent
1932–1938	Football not a sponsored sport
1939–1940	Independent
1941–1956	Football not a sponsored sport
1957	Independent
1958–1972	NCAA College Division
1973–1974	NCAA Division II
1975–1977	NCAA Division III
1978–1985	NCAA Division II
1986–1992	NCAA Division III
1993–2018	NCAA Division II
2019–present	NCAA Division I FCS

=== Conference memberships ===
Seasons	Conference
1928–1931	Independent
1932–1938	Football not a sponsored sport
1939–1940	Independent
1941–1956	Football not a sponsored sport
1957–1971	Independent
1972–1976	Metropolitan Intercollegiate Conference
1977–1984	Independent
1985–1992	Liberty Football Conference
1993–1996	Independent
1997–2000	Eastern Football Conference
2001–2007	Northeast-10 Conference
2008–2012	Pennsylvania State Athletic Conference
2013–2018	Northeast-10 Conference
2019–present	Northeast Conference

== Conference championships ==
LIU has won 19 conference championships, five shared and 14 outright.

Year	Coach	Conference	Record	Conference record
1972	Dom Anile	Metropolitan Intercollegiate Conference	6–3	3–0
1973	Dom Anile	Metropolitan Intercollegiate Conference	10–1	5–0
1974	Dom Anile	Metropolitan Intercollegiate Conference	6–4	4–0
1975	Dom Anile	Metropolitan Intercollegiate Conference	9–1	4–0
1976	Dom Anile	Metropolitan Intercollegiate Conference	8–2	3–0
1988†	Tom Marshall	Liberty Football Conference	5–5	5–1
1990	Tom Marshall	Liberty Football Conference	7–3	5–0
1999	Bryan Collins	EFC Atlantic Division	9–2	7–1
2000	Bryan Collins	EFC Atlantic Division	8–2	7–1
2001	Bryan Collins	Northeast-10 Conference	11–1	9–1
2002	Bryan Collins	Northeast-10 Conference	11–1	10–0
2004†	Bryan Collins	Northeast-10 Conference	8–3	8–1
2005	Bryan Collins	Northeast-10 Conference	10–3	8–1
2006†	Bryan Collins	Northeast-10 Conference	7–3	7–2
2011†	Bryan Collins	PSAC East Division	7–4	6–1
2014	Bryan Collins	Northeast-10 Conference	8–4	7–2
2016	Bryan Collins	Northeast-10 Conference	12–1	9–0
2018	Bryan Collins	Northeast-10 Conference	10–1	9–0
2026†	Ron Cooper	Northeast Conference	5–7	5–2

† Co-champions

== Postseason history ==
=== Bowl games ===
LIU participated in one NCAA College Division level bowl games, going 0–1.

Season	Coach	Bowl	Opponent	Result
1971	Dom Anile	Boardwalk Bowl	Delaware	L 22–72

=== NCAA Division I Playoffs ===
LIU will participate in the NCAA Division I playoffs for the first time in 2026.

Season	Coach	Round	Opponent	Result
2026	Ron Cooper	First Round	Northern Arizona	TBD

=== NCAA Division III Playoffs ===
LIU participated in the NCAA Division III playoffs as C.W. Post.

Season	Coach	Round	Opponent	Result
1976	Dom Anile	Quarterfinals	Towson State	L 10–14

=== NCAA Division II Playoffs ===
LIU participated in the NCAA Division II playoffs as LIU Post.

Season	Coach	Round	Opponent	Result
2002	Bryan Collins	First round	Grand Valley State	L 13–62
2004	Bryan Collins	First round	West Chester	L 3–35
2005	Bryan Collins	First round Second Round; Quarterfinals	West Chester; Shepherd; East Stroudsburg	W 24–20; W 28–21; L 28–55
2014	Bryan Collins	First round	Virginia State	L 17–28
2016	Bryan Collins	First round Second Round	Winston-Salem State; Shepherd	W 48–41; L 21–40
2018	Bryan Collins	First round	Slippery Rock	L 14–20

== Future non-conference opponents ==
Announced schedules as of May 12, 2026.

2026	2027	2028	2029	2030
at North Dakota	North Dakota	at Eastern Michigan	at Montana State	at New Hampshire
at Kansas	at Delaware		New Hampshire	
Albany	at Rutgers			
Villanova				
at FIU				

== Home stadium ==
The Sharks play their home games at Bethpage Federal Credit Union Stadium in Brookville, New York. The stadium was upgraded to meet NCAA Division I requirements as part of the program's elevation to D-I. The visiting stands were demolished and replaced with larger stands that mirror the home side; the expansion brought the capacity up to 6,000 seats.

== Notable former players ==
- Perry Klein (LIU Post) – Set multiple NCAA Division II passing records in 1993, including single-season records for passing yards (3,757) and total offense (4,025), and was named Division II Player of the Year.

== Rivalries ==
The Sharks maintain a regional rivalry with the Wagner Seahawks, another Northeast Conference member located on Staten Island.
