= American International Yellow Jackets football =

College football team

- First season: 1934; 92 years ago
- Athletic director: Scott Foulis
- Head coach: Daniel Chipka; 2nd season, 6–15 (.286)
- Location: Springfield, Massachusetts
- Stadium: Ronald J. Abdow Field (capacity: 4,000)
- NCAA division: Division II
- Conference: NE-10
- Colors: Black, white, and gold
- All-time record: 271–239–5 (.531)

Conference championships
- 5

Division championships
- 4
- Mascot: Yellowjacket
- Website: aicyellowjackets.com

The American International Yellow Jackets football team represents American International College in college football at the NCAA Division II level. The Yellow Jackets are members of the Northeast-10 Conference, fielding its team in the NE-10 since 2001. The Yellow Jackets play their home games at Ronald J. Abdow Field in Springfield, Massachusetts.

Their head coach is Daniel Chipka, who took over the position for the 2024 season as an interim.

== Conference affiliations since 1973 ==
- NCAA Division II independent (1973–1996)
- Eastern Football Conference (1997–2000)
- Northeast-10 Conference (2001–present)

== List of head coaches ==
=== Key ===
Key to symbols in coaches list
General		Overall		Conference		Postseason (Note: Although the first Rose Bowl Game was played in 1902, it has been continuously played since the 1916 game, and is recognized as the oldest bowl game by the NCAA. "—" indicates any season prior to 1916 when postseason games were not played.)	
No.	Order of coaches (Note: A running total of the number of head coaches, with coaches who served separate tenures being counted only once. Interim head coaches are represented with "Int" and are not counted in the running total. "—" indicates the team played but either without a coach or no coach is on record. "X" indicates an interim year without play.)	GC	Games coached	CW	Conference wins	PW	Postseason wins
DC	Division championships	OW	Overall wins	CL	Conference losses	PL	Postseason losses
CC	Conference championships	OL	Overall losses	CT	Conference ties	PT	Postseason ties
NC	National championships	OT	Overall ties (Note: Overtime rules in college football were introduced in 1996, making ties impossible in the period since.)	C%	Conference winning percentage		
†	Elected to the College Football Hall of Fame	O%	Overall winning percentage (Note: When computing the win–loss percentage, a tie counts as half a win and half a loss.)				

=== Coaches ===
List of head football coaches showing season(s) coached, overall records, conference records, postseason records, championships and selected awards
No.	Name	Season(s)	GC	OW	OL	OT	O%	CW	CL	CT	C%	PW	PL	PT	DC	CC	Awards
1	Russ Peterson	1934–1940															
2	Bill Moge	1941–1942															
3	Henry A. Johnson	1946															
4	George Wood	1947															
5	Henry A. Butova	1948, 1952–1955															
6	Thomas Gannon	1949–1951															
7	Gayton Salvucci	1956–1970															
8	Milt Piepul	1971–1975	27	17	10	0	0.630	–	–	–	–	–	–	–	–	–	–
9	Bob Burke	1976–1982	66	36	28	2	0.561	–	–	–	–	–	–	–	–	–	–
10	Alex Rotsko	1983–1992	101	52	46	3	0.530	–	–	–	–	–	–	–	–	–	–
11	Bob LeCours	1993	10	3	7	0	0.300	–	–	–	–	–	–	–	–	–	–
12	Art Wilkins	1994–2019	269	151	118	0	0.561	129	72	0	0.642	0	2	0	4	5	2× NE-10 Coach of the Year (2008, 2013)
13	Kris Kulzer	2020–2022	20	5	15	0	0.250	3	12	0	0.200	–	–	–	–	–	–
14	Lou Conte	2023	11	3	8	0	0.273	2	6	0	0.250	–	–	–	–	–	–
15	Dan Chipka	2024–present	21	6	15	0	0.286	5	10	0	0.333	–	–	–	–	–	–

== Year-by-year results since 1973 ==
National champions	Conference champions	Bowl game berth	Playoff berth

Season	Year	Head coach	Association	Division	Conference	Record							Postseason	Final ranking
Season	Year	Head coach	Association	Division	Conference	Overall			Conference				Postseason	Final ranking
Season	Year	Head coach	Association	Division	Conference	Win	Loss	Tie	Finish	Win	Loss	Tie	Postseason	Final ranking
American International Yellow Jackets
1973	1973	Milt Piepul	NCAA	Division II	Independent	5	4	0	–	–	–	–	—	—
1974	1974	Milt Piepul	NCAA	Division II	Independent	4	5	0	–	–	–	–	—	—
1975	1975	Milt Piepul	NCAA	Division II	Independent	8	1	0	–	–	–	–	—	—
1976	1976	Bob Burke	NCAA	Division II	Independent	6	3	0	–	–	–	–	—	—
1977	1977	Bob Burke	NCAA	Division II	Independent	5	4	1	–	–	–	–	—	—
1978	1978	Bob Burke	NCAA	Division II	Independent	6	2	1	–	–	–	–	—	No. 9
1979	1979	Bob Burke	NCAA	Division II	Independent	6	3	0	–	–	–	–	—	—
1980	1980	Bob Burke	NCAA	Division II	Independent	8	2	0	–	–	–	–	—	No. 9
1981	1981	Bob Burke	NCAA	Division II	Independent	1	8	0	–	–	–	–	—	—
1982	1982	Bob Burke	NCAA	Division II	Independent	4	6	0	–	–	–	–	—	—
1983	1983	Alex Rotsko	NCAA	Division II	Independent	4	7	0	–	–	–	–	—	—
1984	1984	Alex Rotsko	NCAA	Division II	Independent	4	6	0	–	–	–	–	—	—
1985	1985	Alex Rotsko	NCAA	Division II	Independent	8	2	0	–	–	–	–	—	No. 14
1986	1986	Alex Rotsko	NCAA	Division II	Independent	6	4	0	–	–	–	–	—	—
1987	1987	Alex Rotsko	NCAA	Division II	Independent	3	5	2	–	–	–	–	—	—
1988	1988	Alex Rotsko	NCAA	Division II	Independent	5	5	0	–	–	–	–	—	—
1989	1989	Alex Rotsko	NCAA	Division II	Independent	7	3	0	–	–	–	–	—	No. 19
1990	1990	Alex Rotsko	NCAA	Division II	Independent	7	3	0	–	–	–	–	—	No. 17
1991	1991	Alex Rotsko	NCAA	Division II	Independent	4	5	1	–	–	–	–	—	—
1992	1992	Alex Rotsko	NCAA	Division II	Independent	4	6	0	–	–	–	–	—	—
1993	1993	Bob LeCours	NCAA	Division II	Independent	3	7	0	–	–	–	–	—	—
1994	1994	Art Wilkins	NCAA	Division II	Independent	3	7	0	–	–	–	–	—	—
1995	1995	Art Wilkins	NCAA	Division II	Independent	2	8	0	–	–	–	–	—	—
1996	1996	Art Wilkins	NCAA	Division II	Independent	6	4	0	–	–	–	–	—	—
1997	1997	Art Wilkins	NCAA	Division II	EFC	8	4	0	1st (Bay State)	8	0	0	L EFC Championship	—
1998	1998	Art Wilkins	NCAA	Division II	EFC	7	4	0	T–1st (Bay State)	7	2	0	L EFC Championship	—
1999	1999	Art Wilkins	NCAA	Division II	EFC	10	2	0	1st (Bay State)	8	1	0	W EFC Championship	—
2000	2000	Art Wilkins	NCAA	Division II	EFC	9	3	0	1st (Central)	8	1	0	W EFC Championship	—
2001	2001	Art Wilkins	NCAA	Division II	NE-10	8	2	0	T–2nd	8	2	0	—	—
2002	2002	Art Wilkins	NCAA	Division II	NE-10	5	6	0	T–5th	5	5	0	—	—
2003	2003	Art Wilkins	NCAA	Division II	NE-10	5	4	0	5th	5	4	0	—	—
2004	2004	Art Wilkins	NCAA	Division II	NE-10	5	4	0	5th	5	4	0	—	—
2005	2005	Art Wilkins	NCAA	Division II	NE-10	5	4	0	5th	5	4	0	—	—
2006	2006	Art Wilkins	NCAA	Division II	NE-10	6	4	0	5th	6	3	0	—	—
2007	2007	Art Wilkins	NCAA	Division II	NE-10	7	3	0	T–2nd	7	2	0	—	—
2008	2008	Art Wilkins	NCAA	Division II	NE-10	9	2	0	1st	7	0	0	L Super Regional First Round	No. 25
2009	2009	Art Wilkins	NCAA	Division II	NE-10	5	5	0	7th	3	5	0	—	—
2010	2010	Art Wilkins	NCAA	Division II	NE-10	6	4	0	T–1st	6	2	0	—	—
2011	2011	Art Wilkins	NCAA	Division II	NE-10	6	4	0	T–3rd	5	3	0	—	—
2012	2012	Art Wilkins	NCAA	Division II	NE-10	7	3	0	2nd	7	1	0	L NE-10 Championship	—
2013	2013	Art Wilkins	NCAA	Division II	NE-10	9	3	0	T–1st	8	1	0	L Super Region 1 First Round	—
2014	2014	Art Wilkins	NCAA	Division II	NE-10	8	3	0	1st	8	1	0	L NE-10 Championship	—
2015	2015	Art Wilkins	NCAA	Division II	NE-10	4	7	0	7th	4	5	0	—	—
2016	2016	Art Wilkins	NCAA	Division II	NE-10	4	7	0	7th	3	6	0	—	—
2017	2017	Art Wilkins	NCAA	Division II	NE-10	2	8	0	T–8th	2	7	0	—	—
2018	2018	Art Wilkins	NCAA	Division II	NE-10	1	8	0	T–9th	1	8	0	—	—
2019	2019	Art Wilkins	NCAA	Division II	NE-10	4	6	0	7th	3	5	0	—	—
Season canceled due to COVID-19
2021	2021	Kris Kulzer	NCAA	Division II	NE-10	4	6	0	T–7th	2	6	0	—	—
2022	2022	Kris Kulzer	NCAA	Division II	NE-10	1	9	0	T–7th	1	6	0	—	—
2023	2023	Lou Conte	NCAA	Division II	NE-10	3	8	0	8th	2	6	0	—	—
2024	2024	Dan Chipka	NCAA	Division II	NE-10	4	7	0	T–6th	3	5	0	—	—
2025	2025	Dan Chipka	NCAA	Division II	NE-10	2	8	0	6th	2	5	0	—	—

== See also ==
- American International Yellow Jackets
