= Bryant Bulldogs football =

Football team representing Bryant University

2026 Bryant Bulldogs football team
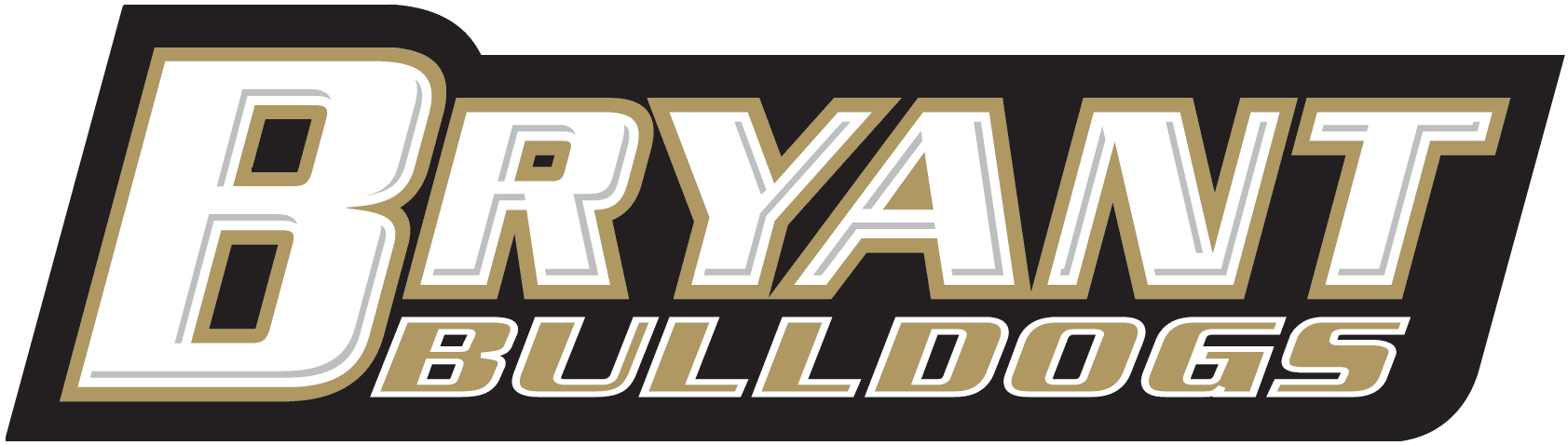
- First season: 1999; 27 years ago
- Head coach: Chris Merritt; 7th season, 28–45 (.384)
- Location: Smithfield, Rhode Island
- Stadium: Beirne Stadium (capacity: 5,500)
- NCAA division: Division I FCS
- Conference: CAA Football (from 2024)
- Colors: Black and gold
- All-time record: 141–144 (.495)

Conference championships
- NE10: 2006, 2007
- Website: bryantbulldogs.com

The Bryant Bulldogs football program represents Bryant University in college football. As of the 2024 season, the Bulldogs have been members of CAA Football, an NCAA Division I Football Championship Subdivision (FCS) league operated by, but legally separate from, the multi-sports Coastal Athletic Association. Bryant had played the 2023 season in the Big South–OVC Football Association formed in that season as a football-only alliance, also operating at the FCS level, between the Big South Conference and Ohio Valley Conference. The team has played its home games at Beirne Stadium in Smithfield, Rhode Island since its opening in 1999 as Bulldog Stadium. It received its current name in 2016.

== History ==
Bryant University football was created in 1999 joining the Division II level Northeast-10 Conference which they had been charter members of since the conference's inception in 1980.

Bryant has only had 4 coaches since its inception. The first Bulldog coach was Jim Miceli who coached the team from 1999 until 2003 followed by the second Bulldog coach Marty Fine, who coached the team from 2004- 2016. Before becoming the Bryant head coach, Fine was an assistant head coach at Iowa State University. In his third year as Bryant head coach, Fine led the Bulldogs to the playoffs. Fine resigned from his position on December 1, 2016. On January 3, 2017, Bryant University hired James Perry as the 3rd head coach of the Bulldog football program. Perry left Bryant to join his alma-mater Brown University on December 3, 2018. On December 21, 2018 Bryant University President Ronald K. Machtley and director of athletics Bill Smith officially announced Chris Merritt as the fourth head coach of the Bryant football program.

Bryant made the playoffs in its 8th season as a team, hosting the first-round game against West Chester University. The crowd was the largest recorded in Bryant's short history with 5,434 fans in attendance. The game came down to the final drive with Bryant in possession, but came up short after an interception, sealing the game and the win for West Chester University.

With the school’s success in multiple sports, Bryant began its transition to Division I. Bryant considered three conferences; The Northeast Conference, The Patriot League and The Metro Atlantic Athletic Conference. With the move to Division I, Bryant offered scholarships to its football players for the first time. After a long search, Bryant accepted an invite to the NEC and started competing in Division I in 2008–09. They became playoff-eligible and a full member of the NEC in 2012.

On March 29, 2022, Bryant announced it would leave the NEC to join the America East Conference, which does not sponsor football. On the same day, Bryant announced that its football team would join the Big South Conference, which had announced a month earlier that it would merge its football league with that of the Ohio Valley Conference after the 2022 season.

=== The beginning, the Miceli era ===
Bryant Bulldogs football started in the fall of 1999. In their home opener against Assumption College, the team packed the stands with 4,817 fans. From 1999–2002, the team operated at around .500. 2003 was an all-time low and the end of the Miceli era. The team posted a 3–7 record, with two losing streaks of three. Coach Miceli resigned after the 2003 season.

=== Marty Fine era ===
Marty Fine took over the football team in the 2004 season when the school went from Bryant College to Bryant University. In his first season, he posted a .500 record. During the next two seasons under Marty Fine, the team posted 7–3 and 8–3 records (0–1 in playoffs).

Under Fine, the team brought in Division I transfers, including Lorenzo Perry from UMass Amherst. In around two years, Lorenzo Perry broke many rushing records at the university. Perry was also a Harlen Hill Award finalist, the Heisman Trophy for Division II. Perry also made NCAA All-American Team. During Fine’s four-year tenure, he became the all-time leader in wins for Bryant football.

Under coach Fine, the Bulldogs had three consecutive winning seasons before the move to Division I. The team also had its longest win streak at seven straight to start the season. In 2008, as a Division I team, the team began to give its first scholarships.

=== The James Perry era ===
On January 3, 2017 Bryant University president Ronald K. Machtley and director of athletics Bill Smith announced the hiring of James Perry, a former quarterback, as the next head coach of the Bulldog football program. Perry led Princeton to Ivy League titles in 2013 and 2016, coaching three All-Ivy League quarterbacks over four seasons.

A 2000 graduate of Brown University, Perry spent three years at his alma mater as an offensive assistant before joining the Princeton staff in 2010. He coached the quarterbacks and served as recruiting coordinator for the Bears, helping them win an Ivy League crown in 2008. Michael Dougherty thrived under Perry, graduating eighth all-time in league history with 487 career completions and 11th all-time with 5,763 career passing yards while also setting a still-standing Ivy League record for total offense in a game (538 yards in 2008).

As a quarterback at Brown, Perry led the Bears to the 1999 Ivy League Championship, finishing the season with 3,255 passing yards and 27 touchdowns. He was named a finalist for the Walter Payton Award and was the recipient of both the Bulger Lowe Award as the Outstanding Offensive Player of the Year in New England and the New England Football Writers Gold Helmet of the Year. He was a three-time First Team All-Ivy League pick and earned the 1999 Ivy League Player of the Year.

In addition to his numerous accolades, Perry set many school and Ivy League passing records during his playing career. He graduated as the all-time leader in total offense in a career (9,236), passing yards in a career (9,294) and season (3,255), completions in a career (789) and season (309), and touchdown passes in a career (74) and game (6), still holding the Ivy League mark in the final three. Perry threw for over 400 yards in a game seven times in his career.

On December 3, 2018, it was announced that Perry had accepted the head coaching job at his alma mater Brown University. Perry served as the Bulldogs' head coach for the 2017 and 2018 seasons, posting back-to-back winning seasons and a 12-10 record overall.

=== The Chris Merritt era ===
On December 21, 2018 Bryant University President Ronald K. Machtley and director of athletics Bill Smith officially announced Chris Merritt as the fourth head coach of the Bryant football program. Merritt spent the past 18 years as the head coach at Christopher Columbus High School in Miami, Florida. He posted an overall record 172-45 (.792), leading the Explorers to two state finals appearances (2014, 2018), five Regional Championships, 14 District Championships and an 80-4 record in district competition in the largest high school classification in the state of Florida. In addition, Merritt's program has produced over 100 collegiate football players in 18 seasons at the helm of Christopher Columbus.

== All-time records ==
=== Coaches ===
Coach	Years	Record	Win %
Jim Miceli	1999–2003	26–15	.634
Marty Fine	2004–2016	80–61	.567
James Perry	2017-2018	12-10	.545
Chris Merritt	2019–present	23-26	.469
Totals	1999–present	141–112	.557

=== Series ===
Opponent	Record	Last win	Streak
Albany	2–2	2011	Lost 1
American International	3–6	2011	Won 2
Assumption	10–0	2013	Won 10
Becker	1–0	2006	Won 1
Bentley	4–5	2007	Won 3
Brown	0–1	----	Lost 1
Bucknell	1–1	2014	Won 1
Central Connecticut	3–4	2014	Won 3
Duquesne	4–3	2014	Won 2
Fordham	1–1	2010	Won 1
Gannon	1–0	2003	Won 1
Hofstra	0–1	----	Lost 1
Holy Cross	1–1	2015	Lost 1
Iona	1–0	2008	Won 1
Liberty	0–1	----	Lost 1
LIU (Note: Historically C.W. Post and later LIU Post.)	1–4	2007	Won 1
Maine	1–3	2014	Won 1
Marist	0–2	----	Lost 2
Merrimack	6–6	2014	Won 5
Monmouth	1–5	2012	Lost 1
Mount Ida	1–0	2001	Won 1
Pace	8–0	2007	Won 8
Rhode Island	0–1	----	Lost 1
Robert Morris	6–1	2014	Won 1
Sacred Heart	3–3	2012	Lost 1
Saint Anselm	7–3	2010	Won 5
Saint Francis (PA)	5–1	2014	Won 1
Southern Connecticut	4–6	2009	Won 2
Stonehill	8–1	2011	Won 8
Stony Brook	1–3	2018	Lost 1
UMass	0–1	----	Lost 1
UMass Lowell	2–0	2002	Won 2
Wagner	4–2	2013	Won 1
West Chester	0–1	----	Lost 1

== Year-by-year performance ==
Coach	Season	Record	Home	Away	Win %	Average (Total) Home Attendance
Jim Miceli	1999	3–2	2–0	1–2	.600	2,940 (5,880)
Jim Miceli	2000	6–3	4–1	2–2	.666	2,181 (10,905)
Jim Miceli	2001	7–2	4–1	3–1	.777	3,221 (16,105)
Jim Miceli	2002	6–3	3–1	3–2	.666	2,912 (11,648)
Jim Miceli	2003	4–5	3–1	1–4	.444	2,706 (10,824)
Marty Fine	2004	5–5	2–3	2–2	.500	3,305 (16,525)
Marty Fine	2005	7–3	5–0	2–3	.700	3,999 (19,995)
Marty Fine	2006	8–3	5–2	3–1	.750	4,226 (29,582)
Marty Fine	2007	8–3	4–0	4–3	.750	4,686 (18,744)
Marty Fine	2008	7–4	4–1	3–3	.637	5,302 (26,510)
Marty Fine	2009	5–6	3–2	2–4	.475	4,617 (23,805)
Marty Fine	2010	7–4	6–1	1–3	.637	4,391 (30,742)
Marty Fine	2011	7–4	4–2	3–2	.636	5,929 (35,572)
Marty Fine	2012	4–7	2–4	2–3	.364	3,288 (19,723)
Marty Fine	2013	4–7	3–4	2–3	.364	3,581 (25,064)
Marty Fine	2014	8–3	5–1	3–2	.727	N/A
Marty Fine	2015	5–6	3–1	2–5	.455	N/A
Marty Fine	2016	5–6	4–1	1–5	.455	N/A
James Perry	2017	6–5	4–1	2–4	.545	N/A
James Perry	2018	6–5	3–2	3–3	.545	N/A
Totals	1999–2017	112–81	70-27	42–54	.582	3,846 (315,412)

== Playoff appearances ==
=== NCAA Division II playoffs ===
The Bulldogs made two appearances in the Division II playoffs, with a combined record of 0-2.

Year	Round	Opponent	Result
2006	First Round	West Chester	L, 29–31
2007	First Round	Southern Connecticut	L, 28–45

== Future non-conference opponents ==
Announced schedules as of September 22, 2026.

2026	2027	2029
at Stonehill	at Western Michigan	at UMass
at Army	Brown	
Princeton		
at Brown		
