= Beirne Stadium =

Athletic stadium in Smithfield, Rhode Island

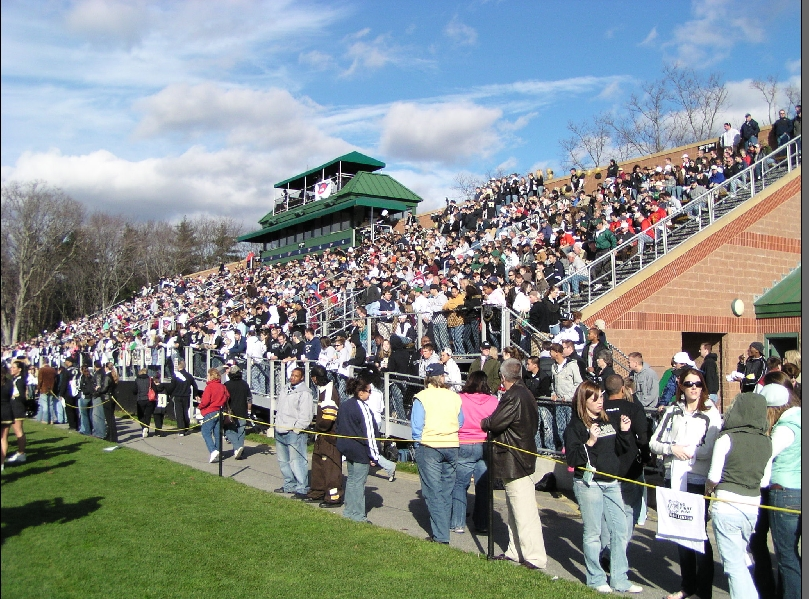
- Interactive map of Beirne Stadium
- Former names: Bulldog Stadium (1999–2016)
- Location: Smithfield, Rhode Island
- Coordinates: 41°55′27.44″N 71°32′18.87″W
- Owner: Bryant University
- Operator: Bryant University
- Capacity: 4,400
- Surface: Artificial Turf

Construction
- Groundbreaking: 1998
- Opened: September 1998

Tenants
- Bryant Bulldogs (NCAA) (1999–present); Rhode Island FC (USLC) (2024); New England Revolution II (MLS Next Pro) (2026)

Beirne Stadium is a stadium in Smithfield, Rhode Island. It is the home stadium for the Bryant University college football and men's and women's soccer and lacrosse programs. Beirne Stadium also hosted USL Championship club Rhode Island FC during their inaugural 2024 season. The stadium holds 4,400 people and was built in 1999. It was renamed from Bulldog Stadium on September 24, 2016. It has also hosted numerous events for Rhode Island high school state championships.

The centerpiece of Bryant University's athletic facilities, Beirne Stadium opened in 1999 as Bulldog Stadium to coincide with the varsity debut of Bryant football. The stadium hosted its first official game on October 2, 1999, which was a 31-20 win over Mt. Ida. On September 24, 2016, it was renamed as part of the David M. '85 and Terry Beirne Stadium Complex.

The facility received upgrades for the 2018 season that include a new FieldTurf playing surface and permanent lighting banks, making Beirne Stadium the first of the three NCAA Division I Football Championship Subdivision (FCS) stadiums in Rhode Island with permanent lights. The Bryant men's and women's lacrosse programs moved full-time from the Bryant Track & Turf Complex to Beirne Stadium for the 2019 season.

With a seating capacity of 4,400, Beirne Stadium utilizes a design that is usually reserved for larger stadiums, ensuring excellent sight lines and maximum comfort for spectators. A 3,200-seat permanent bleacher comprises the backdrop for the home side of the field, while 1,200 additional seats are available on the visitor's side. Three hundred seats in the stadium are equipped with backs and arm rests. The stadium also has its own athletic training center, office space and public rest rooms.

In 2007, the Bulldogs hosted their first ever appearance in the NCAA Division II National Football Championship versus West Chester. In the 2008–09 school year Bryant University Athletics became a Division I sports program. They belong to the America East for most sports, as well as the Big South for football, and Southland Conference for golf and tennis as of the 2022-23 school year.

Rhode Island FC of the USL Championship played their inaugural 2024 season at Beirne Stadium during the construction of their stadium at Tidewater Landing. On December 14, 2023, RIFC announced that they had added an additional 250 seats to the East Side Field Seats and the West Bleachers, bringing the total match-day capacity to 5,252, with an additional statement that that club had season ticket members representing all 39 of Rhode Island’s cities and towns. The team eventually moved out of Beirne Stadium once their stadium in Pawtucket, Centreville Bank Stadium, was completed.

In 2026, the New England Revolution II announced they will be playing all 14 home matches at Beirne Stadium. They played their first match March 1st, winning on penalty shots (4-2) vs Atlanta United 2. On March 22, they beat the newest MLS Next Pro team Connecticut United FC 2-0 for the first ever New England Derby.

== Attendance records ==
Rank	Attendance	Date	Game Result
1	8,364	October 17, 2015	Bryant 38, Duquesne 17
2	7,532	September 23, 2017	Bryant 45, Fordham 40
3	6,432	September 2, 2017	Bryant 49, Merrimack 41
4	5,908	October 24, 2015	Bryant 26, Saint Francis 24
5	5,630	October 18, 2008	Bryant 20, Robert Morris 7
6	5,530	September 13, 2008	Bryant 20, Merrimack 7
7	5,434	October 13, 2007	25 Bryant 34, Stonehill 6
8	5,252	March 16, 2024	RIFC 1, New Mexico United 1
	5,252	August 10, 2024	RIFC 3, Hartford Athletic 0
9	5,234	November 18, 2006	25 Bryant 29, 25 West Chester
10	5,113	September 4, 2010	Bryant 44, Fordham 30
11	5,104	November 1, 2008	Bryant 24, Duquesne 10
12	4,969	September 1, 2018	Bryant 41, New Haven 31
13	4,914	August 10, 2024	RIFC 0, Louisville City 0
14	4,890	October 25, 2014	Bryant 42, Robert Morris 9
15	4,854	September 16, 2006	Bryant 34, Merrimack 7
16	4,823	September 23, 2000	Bryant 49, Assumption 13
17	4,820	September 24, 2005	Bryant 20, Pace 19
18	4,817	August 31, 2013	Bryant 17, Holy Cross 16
	4,817	October 2, 1999	Bryant 31, Mount Ida 20
19	4,748	November 10, 2007	Bryant 29, Bentley 3
20	4,728	July 5, 2024	RIFC 3, Indy Eleven 3

== See also ==
- List of NCAA Division I FCS football stadiums
