= Pace Setters =

- University: Pace University
- Nickname: Setters
- NCAA: Division II
- Conference: Northeast-10
- Athletic director: Mark R. Brown
- Location: New York City, New York
- Varsity teams: 16
- Football stadium: Northwell Stadium
- Basketball arena: Ann and Alfred Goldstein Health, Fitness & Recreation Center
- Baseball stadium: Peter X. Finnerty Field
- Softball stadium: Pace Softball Field
- Colors: Pace Blue and Pace Gold
- Website: paceuathletics.com

The Pace Setters are the athletic teams that represent Pace University, located in New York City, New York, in NCAA Division II intercollegiate sports.

The Setters are full members of the Northeast-10 Conference, which is home to all sixteen of its athletic programs. Pace has been a member of the Northeast-10 since 1997.

== Varsity teams ==
Men's sports	Women's sports
Baseball	Basketball
Basketball	Cross country
Esports	Esports
Football	Field hockey
Lacrosse	Lacrosse
Soccer	Soccer
Swimming and diving	Softball
	Swimming and diving
	Volleyball

== National championships ==
The Setters have won one NCAA team national championship.

=== Team ===
Sport	Association	Division	Year	Opponent/Runner-up	Score
Women's Lacrosse (1)	NCAA	Division II	2023	West Chester	19–9

== Facilities ==
Pace's athletic facilities are highlighted by the 29,000-square-foot (2,700 m^{2}) Goldstein Health, Fitness and Recreation Center in Pleasantville, New York, which boasts a 2,400-seat arena, eight-lane swimming pool, weight/fitness room, aerobics/dance room, training room, locker rooms, equipment room, meeting rooms, and offices of the athletics department.
