= 2026 LIU Sharks football team =

College football team

2026 LIU Sharks football

NEC co-champion

FCS Playoffs
- Conference: Northeast Conference
- Record: 5–7 (5–2 NEC)
- Head coach: Ron Cooper (5th season)
- Co-offensive coordinators: Maurice Harris (1st season); Ian Pace (1st season)
- Defensive coordinator: TyQuan Hammock (3rd season)
- Home stadium: Bethpage Federal Credit Union Stadium

2026 Northeast Conference football standings
	Conf.			Overall
Team	W		L	W		L
LIU +^	5	–	2	5	–	7
Duquesne +	5	–	2	6	–	5
Central Connecticut +	5	–	2	6	–	5
Robert Morris	4	–	3	6	–	6
Wagner	3	–	4	4	–	8
Stonehill	3	–	4	4	–	8
New Haven*	2	–	5	3	–	9
Mercyhurst*	1	–	6	2	–	10
+ – Conference co-champions; ^ – FCS playoff participant; * – Ineligible for NEC title and FCS postseason play due to transition from NCAA Division II.; As of November 22, 2026; Rankings from STATS Poll

The 2026 LIU Sharks football team represents both the LIU Post and LIU Brooklyn campuses of Long Island University as a member of the Northeast Conference (NEC) during the 2026 NCAA Division I FCS football season. The Sharks are led by fifth-year head coach Ron Cooper and play their home games at Bethpage Federal Credit Union Stadium in Brookville, New York.

== Preseason ==
=== NEC poll ===
The Northeast Conference released their preseason poll on August 3, 2026. The Sharks were picked to finish in third place.

== Schedule ==
Date	Time	Opponent	Site	TV	Result	Attendance
August 27	8:00 p.m.	at No. 10 North Dakota*	Alerus Center; Grand Forks, ND	ESPN+	L 21–42	10,344
September 4	8:00 p.m.	at Kansas*	David Booth Kansas Memorial Stadium; Lawrence, KS	ESPNU	L 6–51	30,904
September 12	12:00 p.m.	Albany*	Bethpage Federal Credit Union Stadium; Brookville, NY	NEC Front Row	L 13–35	1,261
September 19	12:00 p.m.	No. 22 Villanova*^{†}	Bethpage Federal Credit Union Stadium; Brookville, NY	NEC Front Row	L 16–20	3,086
September 26	6:00 p.m.	at FIU*	Pitbull Stadium; Miami, FL	ESPN+	L 3–20	17,003
October 3	12:00 p.m.	Mercyhurst	Bethpage Federal Credit Union Stadium; Brookville, NY	ESPN+	W 27–24	1,000
October 10	1:00 p.m.	at Duquesne	Rooney Field; Pittsburgh, PA	NEC Front Row	W 17–14	2,572
October 17	5:00 p.m.	at Wagner	Wagner College Stadium; Staten Island, NY	NEC Front Row	W 14–9	1,665
October 24	12:00 p.m.	Stonehill	Bethpage Federal Credit Union Stadium; Brookville, NY	NEC Front Row	L 14–18	564
November 7	12:00 p.m.	at New Haven	Ralph F. DellaCamera Stadium; West Haven, CT	NEC Front Row	L 10–17	4,287
November 14	12:00 p.m.	Central Connecticut	Bethpage Federal Credit Union Stadium; Brookville, NY	NEC Front Row	W 20–14	742
November 21	12:00 p.m.	at Robert Morris	Joe Walton Stadium; Moon Township, PA	NEC Front Row	W 26–22	1,150
November 28	4:00 p.m.	at No. 10 Northern Arizona*	Walkup Skydome; Flagstaff, AZ (NCAA Division I First Round)	ESPN+		
*Non-conference game; ^{†}Homecoming; Rankings from STATS Poll released prior to the game; All times are in Eastern time; Source:

== Game summaries ==
=== at No. 10 North Dakota ===
LIU Sharks (0–0) at No. 10 North Dakota Fighting Hawks (0–0) – Game summary

Quarter	1	2	3	4	Total
Sharks	0	0	14	7	21
No. 10 Fighting Hawks	22	20	0	0	42

at Alerus Center • Grand Forks, North Dakota

- Date: August 27
- Game time: 8:00 p.m. EDT
- Game weather: none (played indoors)
- Game attendance: 10,344
- Referee: David Hergert
- TV announcers (Midco SN, ESPN+, Midco+): Alex Heinert and Ryan Kasowski

Game information

First quarter

- UND – Korey Tai 14-yard pass from Jerry Kaminski (Luke Silvernale kick), 10:34. Fighting Hawks 7–0. Drive: 11 plays, 75 yards, 4:19.
- UND – Matt Lawson 4-yard run (Hunter Kallstrom run), 7:57. Fighting Hawks 15–0. Drive: 4 plays, 26 yards, 1:22.
- UND – Nathan Hromadka 5-yard pass from Jerry Kaminski (Luke Silvernale kick), 4:40. Fighting Hawks 22–0. Drive: 7 plays, 74 yards, 2:54.

Second quarter

- UND – Caleb Goodloe 28-yard pass from Jerry Kaminski (Luke Silvernale kick), 10:44. Fighting Hawks 29–0. Drive: 4 plays, 39 yards, 1:37.
- UND – Charles Langama 13-yard run (Luke Silvernale kick), 8:55. Fighting Hawks 36–0. Drive: 4 plays, 36 yards, 0:54.
- UND – Matt Lawson 1-yard run (Luke Silvernale kick failed), 2:27. Fighting Hawks 42–0. Drive: 4 plays, 56 yards, 1:51.

Third quarter

- LIU – Tyselle Spencer 13-yard run (Will Johnson kick), 9:59. Fighting Hawks 42–7. Drive: 9 plays, 75 yards, 5:01.
- LIU – Boakai Veikei 65-yard pass from Luca Stanzani (Will Johnson kick), 0:13. Fighting Hawks 42–14. Drive: 2 plays, 80 yards, 0:38.

Fourth quarter

- LIU – Luca Stanzani 1-yard run (Will Johnson kick), 3:38. Fighting Hawks 42–21. Drive: 16 plays, 68 yards, 9:25.

Statistics	LIU	UND
First downs	13	25
Plays–yards	57–255	73–465
Rushes–yards	32–71	46–168
Passing yards	184	297
Passing: comp–att–int	15–25–1	20–27–1
Turnovers	2	1
Time of possession	28:13	31:47

Team	Category	Player	Statistics
LIU	Passing	Luca Stanzani	12/16, 173 yards, TD
LIU	Rushing	Nathan Gray	8 carries, 27 yards
LIU	Receiving	Boakai Veikei	1 reception, 65 yards, TD
North Dakota	Passing	Jerry Kaminski	17/21, 232 yards, 3 TD
North Dakota	Rushing	Charles Langama	12 carries, 51 yards, TD
North Dakota	Receiving	Caleb Goodloe	5 receptions, 118 yards, TD

=== at Kansas (FBS) ===
LIU Sharks (0–1) at Kansas Jayhawks (FBS) (0–0) – Game summary

Quarter	1	2	3	4	Total
Sharks	0	0	0	6	6
Jayhawks (FBS)	6	24	7	14	51

at David Booth Kansas Memorial Stadium • Lawrence, Kansas

- Date: September 4
- Game time: 8:00 p.m.
- Game weather: Sunny • Temperature: 94 °F (34 °C) • Wind: S 7 mph
- Game attendance: 30,904
- Referee: Cravonne Barrett
- TV announcers (ESPNU): Mark Neely and Jeff Woody

Game information

First quarter

- KU – Yasin Willis 5-yard run (pass failed), 5:59. Jayhawks 6–0. Drive: 9 plays, 70 yards, 4:08.

Second quarter

- KU – Martin Connington 32-yard field goal, 9:46. Jayhawks 9–0. Drive: 16 plays, 76 yards, 6:30.
- KU – Yasin Willis 10-yard run (Martin Connington kick), 6:10. Jayhawks 16–0. Drive: 4 plays, 68 yards, 1:59.
- KU – Jalen Dupree 3-yard run (Martin Connington kick), 3:50. Jayhawks 23–0. Drive: 3 plays, 57 yards, 0:48.
- KU – Nick McMillan 19-yard pass from Isaiah Marshall (Martin Connington kick), 0:57. Jayhawks 30–0. Drive: 5 plays, 64 yards, 1:03.

Third quarter

- KU – Tate Nagy 6-yard pass from Isaiah Marshall (Martin Connington kick), 8:13. Jayhawks 37–0. Drive: 15 plays, 72 yards, 6:47.

Fourth quarter

- KU – Micah Johnson 8-yard run (Martin Connington kick), 14:19. Jayhawks 44–0. Drive: 10 plays, 67 yards, 4:53.
- LIU – Will Johnson 39-yard field goal, 10:09. Jayhawks 44–3. Drive: 7 plays, 53 yards, 4:10.
- KU – Donald Collier 3-yard run (Martin Connington kick), 7:22. Jayhawks 51–3. Drive: 6 plays, 74 yards, 2:47.
- LIU – Will Johnson 39-yard field goal, 1:56. Jayhawks 51–6. Drive: 8 plays, 13 yards, 3:54.

Statistics	LIU	KU
First downs	11	29
Plays–yards	53–146	76–613
Rushes–yards	33–35	51–277
Passing yards	111	336
Passing: comp–att–int	10–20–0	18–25–0
Turnovers	1	1
Time of possession	26:54	33:06

Team	Category	Player	Statistics
LIU	Passing	Luca Stanzani	10/19, 111 yards
LIU	Rushing	Luca Stanzani	12 carries, 20 yards
LIU	Receiving	Josiah Brown	3 receptions, 47 yards
Kansas	Passing	Isaiah Marshall	14/19, 246 yards, 2 TD
Kansas	Rushing	Yasin Willis	11 carries, 72 yards, 2 TD
Kansas	Receiving	Nik McMillan	6 receptions, 130 yards, TD

=== Albany ===
Albany Great Danes (1–1) at LIU Sharks (0–2) – Game summary

Quarter	1	2	3	4	Total
Great Danes	0	0	0	0	0
Sharks	0	0	0	0	0

at Bethpage Federal Credit Union Stadium • Brookville, New York

- Date: September 12
- Game time: 12:00 p.m.
- TV: NEC Front Row

Game information

First quarter
Second quarter
Third quarter
Fourth quarter

Statistics	ALB	LIU
First downs	20	15
Plays–yards	63–343	60–221
Rushes–yards	34–106	39–143
Passing yards	237	78
Passing: comp–att–int	21–29–0	11–21–0
Turnovers	1	1
Time of possession	32:22	27:38

Team	Category	Player	Statistics
Albany	Passing	Kai Colon	16/23, 207 yards, 3 TD
Albany	Rushing	Rahshan La Mons	11 carries, 57 yards
Albany	Receiving	Jordan Rae	3 receptions, 51 yards, TD
LIU	Passing	Luca Stanzani	11/19, 78 yards, TD
LIU	Rushing	Nathan Gray	15 carries, 51 yards, TD
LIU	Receiving	Evan Brooks	2 receptions, 25 yards

=== No. 22 Villanova ===
No. 22 Villanova Wildcats (1–2) at LIU Sharks (0–3) – Game summary

Quarter	1	2	3	4	Total
No. 22 Wildcats	0	0	0	0	0
Sharks	0	0	0	0	0

at Bethpage Federal Credit Union Stadium • Brookville, New York

- Date: September 19
- Game time: 12:00 p.m.

Game information

First quarter
Second quarter
Third quarter
Fourth quarter

Statistics	VILL	LIU
First downs	23	19
Plays–yards	58–392	67–327
Rushes–yards	31–169	44–201
Passing yards	223	126
Passing: comp–att–int	19–27–1	10–23–1
Turnovers	2	3
Time of possession	28:50	31:10

Team	Category	Player	Statistics
Villanova	Passing	Pat McQuaide	19/27, 223 yards, TD, INT
Villanova	Rushing	Ja'briel Mace	14 rushes, 97 yards, TD
Villanova	Receiving	Brandon Binkowski	6 receptions, 113 yards
LIU	Passing	Ethan Greenwood	8/21, 113 yards, 2 INT
LIU	Rushing	Ethan Greenwood	26 rushes, 142 yards
LIU	Receiving	Jayden Simpson	1 reception, 47 yards

=== at FIU (FBS) ===
LIU Sharks (0–4) at FIU Panthers (FBS) (1–2) – Game summary

Quarter	1	2	3	4	Total
Sharks	0	0	0	0	0
Panthers (FBS)	0	0	0	0	0

at Pitbull Stadium • Miami, Florida

- Date: September 26
- Game time: 6:00 p.m.
- TV: ESPN+

Game information

First quarter
Second quarter
Third quarter
Fourth quarter

Statistics	LIU	FIU
First downs	11	18
Plays–yards	54–209	60–394
Rushes–yards	34–100	39–167
Passing yards	109	227
Passing: comp–att–int	9–20–1	12–21–1
Turnovers	1	1
Time of possession	27:31	32:29

Team	Category	Player	Statistics
LIU	Passing	Luca Stanzani	9/20, 109 yards, INT
LIU	Rushing	Chris Howell	4 carries, 23 yards
LIU	Receiving	Josiah Brown	2 receptions, 56 yards
FIU	Passing	JJ Kohl	6/11, 135 yards, TD, INT
FIU	Rushing	Anthony Carrie	14 carries, 71 yards
FIU	Receiving	Maguire Anderson	3 receptions, 58 yards

=== Mercyhurst ===
Mercyhurst Lakers (1–4) at LIU Sharks (0–5) – Game summary

Quarter	1	2	3	4	Total
Lakers	0	0	0	0	0
Sharks	0	0	0	0	0

at Bethpage Federal Credit Union Stadium • Brookville, New York

- Date: October 3
- Game time: 12:00 p.m.

Game information

First quarter
Second quarter
Third quarter
Fourth quarter

Statistics	MERC	LIU
First downs		
Plays–yards		
Rushes–yards		
Passing yards		
Passing: comp–att–int		
Turnovers		
Time of possession		

Team	Category	Player	Statistics
Mercyhurst	Passing		
Mercyhurst	Rushing		
Mercyhurst	Receiving		
LIU	Passing		
LIU	Rushing		
LIU	Receiving		

=== at Duquesne ===
LIU Sharks (1–5) at Duquesne Dukes (1–3) – Game summary

Quarter	1	2	3	4	Total
Sharks	0	0	0	0	0
Dukes	0	0	0	0	0

at Rooney Field • Pittsburgh, Pennsylvania

- Date: October 10
- Game time: 1:00 p.m.

Game information

First quarter
Second quarter
Third quarter
Fourth quarter

Statistics	LIU	DUQ
First downs		
Plays–yards		
Rushes–yards		
Passing yards		
Passing: comp–att–int		
Turnovers		
Time of possession		

Team	Category	Player	Statistics
LIU	Passing		
LIU	Rushing		
LIU	Receiving		
Duquesne	Passing		
Duquesne	Rushing		
Duquesne	Receiving		

=== at Wagner ===
LIU Sharks (2–5) at Wagner Seahawks (1–5) – Game summary

Quarter	1	2	3	4	Total
Sharks	0	0	0	0	0
Seahawks	0	0	0	0	0

at Wagner College Stadium • Staten Island, New York

- Date: October 17
- Game time: 5:00 p.m.

Game information

First quarter
Second quarter
Third quarter
Fourth quarter

Statistics	LIU	WAG
First downs		
Plays–yards		
Rushes–yards		
Passing yards		
Passing: comp–att–int		
Turnovers		
Time of possession		

Team	Category	Player	Statistics
LIU	Passing		
LIU	Rushing		
LIU	Receiving		
Wagner	Passing		
Wagner	Rushing		
Wagner	Receiving		

=== Stonehill ===
Stonehill Skyhawks (2–5) at LIU Sharks (3–5) – Game summary

Quarter	1	2	3	4	Total
Skyhawks	0	0	0	0	0
Sharks	0	0	0	0	0

at Bethpage Federal Credit Union Stadium • Brookville, New York

- Date: October 24
- Game time: 12:00 p.m.

Game information

First quarter
Second quarter
Third quarter
Fourth quarter

Statistics	STO	LIU
First downs		
Plays–yards		
Rushes–yards		
Passing yards		
Passing: comp–att–int		
Turnovers		
Time of possession		

Team	Category	Player	Statistics
Stonehill	Passing		
Stonehill	Rushing		
Stonehill	Receiving		
LIU	Passing		
LIU	Rushing		
LIU	Receiving		

=== at New Haven ===
LIU Sharks (3–6) at New Haven Chargers (2–7) – Game summary

Quarter	1	2	3	4	Total
Sharks	0	0	0	0	0
Chargers	0	0	0	0	0

at Ralph F. DellaCamera Stadium • West Haven, Connecticut

- Date: November 7
- Game time: 12:00 p.m.

Game information

First quarter
Second quarter
Third quarter
Fourth quarter

Statistics	LIU	NH
First downs		
Plays–yards		
Rushes–yards		
Passing yards		
Passing: comp–att–int		
Turnovers		
Time of possession		

Team	Category	Player	Statistics
LIU	Passing		
LIU	Rushing		
LIU	Receiving		
New Haven	Passing		
New Haven	Rushing		
New Haven	Receiving		

=== Central Connecticut ===
Central Connecticut Blue Devils (6–3) at LIU Sharks (3–7) – Game summary

Quarter	1	2	3	4	Total
Blue Devils	0	0	0	0	0
Sharks	0	0	0	0	0

at Bethpage Federal Credit Union Stadium • Brookville, New York

- Date: November 14
- Game time: 12:00 p.m.

Game information

First quarter
Second quarter
Third quarter
Fourth quarter

Statistics	CCSU	LIU
First downs		
Plays–yards		
Rushes–yards		
Passing yards		
Passing: comp–att–int		
Turnovers		
Time of possession		

Team	Category	Player	Statistics
Central Connecticut	Passing		
Central Connecticut	Rushing		
Central Connecticut	Receiving		
LIU	Passing		
LIU	Rushing		
LIU	Receiving		

=== at Robert Morris ===
LIU Sharks (4–7) at Robert Morris Colonials (6–5) – Game summary

Quarter	1	2	3	4	Total
Sharks	0	0	0	0	0
Colonials	0	0	0	0	0

at Joe Walton Stadium • Moon Township, Pennsylvania

- Date: November 21
- Game time: 12:00 p.m.

Game information

First quarter
Second quarter
Third quarter
Fourth quarter

Statistics	LIU	RMU
First downs		
Plays–yards		
Rushes–yards		
Passing yards		
Passing: comp–att–int		
Turnovers		
Time of possession		

Team	Category	Player	Statistics
LIU	Passing		
LIU	Rushing		
LIU	Receiving		
Robert Morris	Passing		
Robert Morris	Rushing		
Robert Morris	Receiving		
