= 2026 Stonehill Skyhawks football team =

American college football season

2026 Stonehill Skyhawks football
- Conference: Northeast Conference
- Record: 4–8 (3–4 NEC)
- Head coach: Eli Gardner (10th season)
- Offensive coordinator: Dan Herbert (2nd season)
- Defensive coordinator: Kyle Jones (6th season)
- Home stadium: W. B. Mason Stadium

2026 Northeast Conference football standings
	Conf.			Overall
Team	W		L	W		L
LIU +^	5	–	2	5	–	7
Duquesne +	5	–	2	6	–	5
Central Connecticut +	5	–	2	6	–	5
Robert Morris	4	–	3	6	–	6
Wagner	3	–	4	4	–	8
Stonehill	3	–	4	4	–	8
New Haven*	2	–	5	3	–	9
Mercyhurst*	1	–	6	2	–	10
+ – Conference co-champions; ^ – FCS playoff participant; * – Ineligible for NEC title and FCS postseason play due to transition from NCAA Division II.; As of November 22, 2026; Rankings from STATS Poll

The 2026 Stonehill Skyhawks football team represent Stonehill College as a member of the Northeast Conference (NEC) during the 2026 NCAA Division I FCS football season. The Skyhawks are led by tenth-year head coach Eli Gardner and play their home games at W. B. Mason Stadium.

== Schedule ==
Date	Time	Opponent	Site	TV	Result	Attendance
August 29	6:00 p.m.	Bryant*	W. B. Mason Stadium; Easton, MA	NEC Front Row	L 6–24	2,826
September 5	12:00 p.m.	at New Haven	Ralph F. DellaCamera Stadium; West Haven, CT	NEC Front Row/NESN+	W 21–3	4,797
September 12	6:00 p.m.	at New Hampshire*	Wildcat Stadium; Durham, NH	FloSports	L 35–42	5,480
September 19	3:30 p.m.	at UMass*	McGuirk Alumni Stadium; Amherst, MA	ESPN+	L 14–36	12,233
September 26	3:30 p.m.	at Ohio*	Peden Stadium; Athens, OH	ESPN+	L 7–35	20,723
October 10	12:00 p.m.	at Sacred Heart*	Sikorsky Credit Union Field; Fairfield, CT	FloSports	W 28–7	3,208
October 17	1:00 p.m.	Duquesne	W. B. Mason Stadium; Easton, MA	NEC Front Row	L 7–14	3,894
October 24	1:00 p.m.	at LIU	Bethpage Federal Credit Union Stadium; Brookville, NY	NEC Front Row	W 18–14	564
October 31	12:00 p.m.	Mercyhurst	W. B. Mason Stadium; Easton, MA	NEC Front Row	W 34–28	550
November 7	1:00 p.m.	Central Connecticut^{†}	W. B. Mason Stadium; Easton, MA	ESPN+/NESN+	L 7–31	1,337
November 14	12:00 p.m.	at Robert Morris	Joe Walton Stadium; Moon Township, PA	NESN+/ESPN+	L 3–14	1,192
November 21	12:00 p.m.	Wagner	W. B. Mason Stadium; Easton, MA	NEC Front Row/NESN+	L 31–35	797
*Non-conference game; ^{†}Homecoming; All times are in Eastern time

== Game summaries ==
=== Bryant ===
Bryant Bulldogs (0–0) at Stonehill Skyhawks (0–0) – Game summary

Quarter	1	2	3	4	Total
Bulldogs	7	0	0	17	24
Skyhawks	0	3	0	3	6

at W.B. Mason Stadium • Easton, Massachusetts

- Date: August 29
- Game time: 6:00 p.m. EDT
- Game weather: Sunny • Temperature: 79 °F (26 °C) • Wind: SW at 3 miles per hour (4.8 km/h)
- Game attendance: 2,826
- Referee: Michael Davis
- TV: NEC Front Row

Game information

First quarter

- BRY – OJ Ross 10-yard run (Nicholas Stoyanovich kick), 1:04. Bulldogs 7–0. Drive: 11 plays, 56 yards, 5:59.

Second quarter

- STO – Domenic Scalese 29-yard field goal, 10:11. Bulldogs 7–3. Drive: 11 plays, 49 yards, 5:47.

Third quarter

- No scoring plays.

Fourth quarter

- BRY – Jordan Bennett 1-yard run (Nicholas Stoyanovich kick), 14:16. Bulldogs 14–3. Drive: 11 plays, 80 yards, 4:07.
- BRY – Brennan Myer 2-yard run (Nicholas Stoyanovich kick), 8:20. Bulldogs 21–3. Drive: 7 plays, 56 yards, 3:46.
- STO – Domenic Scalese 36-yard field goal, 5:33. Bulldogs 21–6. Drive: 8 plays, 61 yards, 2:41.
- BRY – Nicholas Stoyanovich 27-yard field goal, 1:45. Bulldogs 24–6. Drive: 9 plays, 38 yards, 3:46.

Statistics	BRY	STO
First downs	19	17
Plays–yards	65–299	62–304
Rushes–yards	44–191	32–102
Passing yards	108	202
Passing: comp–att–int	10–21–0	19–30–0
Turnovers	0	1
Time of possession	29:34	30:26

Team	Category	Player	Statistics
Bryant	Passing	Brennan Myer	10/20, 108 yards
Bryant	Rushing	OJ Ross	18 carries, 102 yards, TD
Bryant	Receiving	Sean Wilson Jr.	3 receptions, 43 yards
Stonehill	Passing	Jack O'Connell	19/30, 202 yards
Stonehill	Rushing	Shane Eason	9 carries, 50 yards
Stonehill	Receiving	Alijah Turner	3 receptions, 42 yards

=== at New Haven ===
Stonehill Skyhawks (0–1) at New Haven Chargers (1–0) – Game summary

Quarter	1	2	3	4	Total
Skyhawks	7	14	0	0	21
Chargers	3	0	0	0	3

at Ralph F. DellaCamera Stadium • West Haven, Connecticut

- Date: September 5
- Game time: 12:00 p.m.
- Game weather: Sunny
- Game attendance: 4,797
- Referee: Lance Carlen
- TV: NEC Front Row/NESN+

Game information

First quarter

- NH – Liam Quigley 21-yard field goal, 12:19. Chargers 3–0. Drive: 8 plays, 43 yards, 2:23.
- STO – Aidan Garrett 25-yard pass from Jack O'Connell (Domenic Scalese kick), 9:14. Skyhawks 7–3. Drive: 7 plays, 75 yards, 3:05.

Second quarter

- STO – Aidan Garrett 1-yard run (Domenic Scalese kick), 4:18. Skyhawks 14–3. Drive: 10 plays, 44 yards, 5:43.
- STO – Torance Washington Jr. 31-yard pass from Jack O'Connell (Domenic Scalese kick), 1:54. Skyhawks 21–3. Drive: 4 plays, 43 yards, 1:16.

Third quarter

- No scoring plays.

Fourth quarter

- No scoring plays.

Statistics	STO	NH
First downs	21	14
Plays–yards	61–373	57–295
Rushes–yards	43–181	22–122
Passing yards	192	173
Passing: comp–att–int	14–18–0	17–35–2
Turnovers	2	2
Time of possession	38:31	21:29

Team	Category	Player	Statistics
Stonehill	Passing	Jack O'Connell	14/18, 192 yards, 2 TD
Stonehill	Rushing	Shane Eason	15 carries, 82 yards
Stonehill	Receiving	Cole Clarke	2 receptions, 46 yards
New Haven	Passing	AJ Duffy	17/35, 173 yards, 2 INT
New Haven	Rushing	Zaon Laney	17 carries, 114 yards
New Haven	Receiving	Matt Chandler	4 receptions, 49 yards

=== at New Hampshire ===
Stonehill Skyhawks (1–1) at New Hampshire Wildcats (0–2) – Game summary

Quarter	1	2	3	4	Total
Skyhawks	7	7	7	14	35
Wildcats	14	7	14	7	42

at Wildcat Stadium • Durham, New Hampshire

- Date: September 12
- Game time: 6:00 p.m.
- Game weather: Sunny
- Game attendance: 5,480
- Referee: Alex Parrella
- TV announcers (FloSports): Calvin Christoforo (play-by-play) and Ben Altsher (analyst)

Game information

First quarter

- (14:47) UNH – Ryan Ricketti 96-yard kickoff return, Lucas Glassburn kick (New Hampshire 7–0)
- (11:03) STO – Shane Eason 3-yard run, Domenic Scalese kick (Drive: 9 plays, 59 yards, 3:38; Tied 7–7)
- (1:37) UNH – Trevor Barry 71-yard blocked field goal return, Lucas Glassburn kick (New Hampshire 14–7)

Second quarter

- (12:46) STO – Kevin Sheridan 16-yard pass from Jack O'Connell, Langdon Laws Jr. kick (Drive: 8 plays, 65 yards, 3:51; Tied 14–14)
- (5:55) UNH – Joquez Smith 26-yard run, Lucas Glassburn kick (Drive: 6 plays, 80 yards, 2:50; New Hampshire 21–14)

Third quarter

- (6:33) UNH – Ty Carlson 5-yard pass from Brooks Bentley, Lucas Glassburn kick (Drive: 8 plays, 66 yards, 2:04; New Hampshire 28–14)
- (3:44) STO – Jaylin Baker 6-yard pass from Jack O'Connell, Langdon Laws Jr. kick (Drive: 5 plays, 65 yards, 2:49; New Hampshire 28–21)
- (2:18) UNH – Joquez Smith 34-yard run, Lucas Glassburn kick (Drive: 4 plays, 75 yards, 1:26; New Hampshire 35–21)

Fourth quarter

- (14:06) STO – Jaylin Baker 21-yard pass from Jack O'Connell, Langdon Laws Jr. kick (Drive: 7 plays, 75 yards, 3:05; New Hampshire 35–28)
- (11:06) UNH – Joquez Smith 3-yard run, Lucas Glassburn kick (Drive: 7 plays, 65 yards, 2:55; New Hampshire 42–28)
- (5:41) STO – Cole Clarke 6-yard pass from Jack O'Connell, Langdon Laws Jr. kick (Drive: 11 plays, 75 yards, 5:18; New Hampshire 42–35)

Statistics	STO	UNH
First downs	26	17
Plays–yards	81–514	53–348
Rushes–yards	37–134	31–153
Passing yards	380	195
Passing: comp–att–int	27–44–0	14–22–0
Turnovers	1	0
Time of possession	37:58	22:02

Team	Category	Player	Statistics
Stonehill	Passing	Jack O'Connell	27/44, 380 yards, 4 TD
Stonehill	Rushing	Jack O'Connell	17 carries, 53 yards
Stonehill	Receiving	Cole Clarke	4 receptions, 88 yards, TD
New Hampshire	Passing	Brooks Bentley	14/22, 195 yards, TD
New Hampshire	Rushing	Joquez Smith	13 carries, 122 yards, 3 TD
New Hampshire	Receiving	Ja'Carree Kelly	5 receptions, 78 yards

=== at UMass (FBS) ===
Stonehill Skyhawks (1–2) at UMass Minutemen (FBS) (2–0) – Game summary

Quarter	1	2	3	4	Total
Skyhawks	7	0	0	7	14
Minutemen (FBS)	13	0	9	14	36

at Warren McGuirk Alumni Stadium • Hadley, Massachusetts

- Date: September 19
- Game time: 3:30 p.m.
- Game weather: Sunny • Temperature: 69 °F (21 °C) • Wind: NW 2 MPH
- Game attendance: 12,233
- Referee: Marcel Kerr
- TV announcers (ESPN+): Shawn Kenney and Charlie Strong

Game information

First quarter

- MASS – Derek Morris 30-yard field goal, 12:09. Minutemen 3–0. Drive: 4 plays, 5 yards, 1:58.
- STO – Alijah Turner 13-yard pass from Jack O'Connell (Langdon Laws kick), 9:15. Skyhawks 7–3. Drive: 6 plays, 75 yards, 2:54.
- MASS – T. Y. Harding 56-yard run (Derek Morris kick), 7:33. Minutemen 10–7. Drive: 5 plays, 72 yards, 1:33.
- MASS – Derek Morris 55-yard field goal, 1:38. Minutemen 13–7. Drive: 6 plays, 29 yards, 3:50.

Second quarter

No scoring plays

Third quarter

- MASS – Curtis Kimmons IV 1-yard run (pass failed), 9:31. Minutemen 19–7. Drive: 10 plays, 59 yards, 5:26.
- MASS – Derek Morris 33-yard field goal, 2:15. Minutemen 22–7. Drive: 7 plays, 17 yards, 3:04.

Fourth quarter

- MASS – William Watson III 1-yard run (Derek Morris kick), 13:37. Minutemen 29–7. Drive: 5 plays, 40 yards, 2:21.
- MASS – T. Y. Harding 51-yard pass from William Watson III (Derek Morris kick), 10:54. Minutemen 36–7. Drive: 3 plays, 66 yards, 1:37.
- STO – Derek Varley 2-yard pass from Drew Eason (Langdon Laws kick), 3:32. Minutemen 36–14. Drive: 15 plays, 75 yards, 7:22.

Statistics	STO	MASS
First downs	10	15
Plays–yards	59–161	60–355
Rushes–yards	28–27	35–195
Passing yards	134	160
Passing: Comp–Att–Int	16–31–1	15–25–1
Turnovers	3	1
Time of possession	29:52	30:08

Team	Category	Player	Statistics
Stonehill	Passing	Jack O'Connell	10/21, 69 yards, TD, INT
Stonehill	Rushing	Shane Eason	9 carries, 20 yards
Stonehill	Receiving	Shawn Corchado	3 receptions, 41 yards
UMass	Passing	William Watson III	15/25, 160 yards, TD, INT
UMass	Rushing	Elijah Faulkner	11 carries, 69 yards
UMass	Receiving	T. Y. Harding	4 receptions, 73 yards, TD

=== at Ohio ===
Stonehill Skyhawks (1–3) at Ohio Bobcats (1–2) – Game summary

Quarter	1	2	Total
Skyhawks			0
Bobcats			0

at Peden Stadium • Athens, Ohio

- Date: September 26
- Game time: 3:30 p.m. EDT
- TV announcers (ESPN+): Bill Spaulding and Doc Holliday

Game information

First quarter
Second quarter
Third quarter
Fourth quarter

Statistics	STO	OHIO
First downs		
Plays–yards	–	–
Rushes–yards	–	–
Passing yards		
Passing: Comp–Att–Int	––	––
Turnovers		
Time of possession		

Team	Category	Player	Statistics
Stonehill	Passing		
Stonehill	Rushing		
Stonehill	Receiving		
Ohio	Passing		
Ohio	Rushing		
Ohio	Receiving		

=== at Sacred Heart ===
Stonehill Skyhawks (1–4) at Sacred Heart Pioneers (2–3) – Game summary

Quarter	1	2	3	4	Total
Skyhawks	0	0	0	0	0
Pioneers	0	0	0	0	0

at Campus Field • Fairfield, Connecticut

- Date: October 10
- Game time: 12:00 p.m.
- TV: FloSports

Game information

First quarter
Second quarter
Third quarter
Fourth quarter

Statistics	STO	SHU
First downs		
Plays–yards		
Rushes–yards		
Passing yards		
Passing: comp–att–int		
Turnovers		
Time of possession		

Team	Category	Player	Statistics
Stonehill	Passing		
Stonehill	Rushing		
Stonehill	Receiving		
Sacred Heart	Passing		
Sacred Heart	Rushing		
Sacred Heart	Receiving		

=== Duquesne ===
Duquesne Dukes (1–4) at Stonehill Skyhawks (2–4) – Game summary

Quarter	1	2	3	4	Total
Dukes	0	0	0	0	0
Skyhawks	0	0	0	0	0

at W.B. Mason Stadium • Easton, Massachusetts

- Date: October 17
- Game time: 1:00 p.m.

Game information

First quarter
Second quarter
Third quarter
Fourth quarter

Statistics	DUQ	STO
First downs		
Plays–yards		
Rushes–yards		
Passing yards		
Passing: comp–att–int		
Turnovers		
Time of possession		

Team	Category	Player	Statistics
Duquesne	Passing		
Duquesne	Rushing		
Duquesne	Receiving		
Stonehill	Passing		
Stonehill	Rushing		
Stonehill	Receiving		

=== at LIU ===
Stonehill Skyhawks (2–5) at LIU Sharks (3–5) – Game summary

Quarter	1	2	3	4	Total
Skyhawks	0	0	0	0	0
Sharks	0	0	0	0	0

at Bethpage Federal Credit Union Stadium • Brookville, New York

- Date: October 24
- Game time: 12:00 p.m.

Game information

First quarter
Second quarter
Third quarter
Fourth quarter

Statistics	STO	LIU
First downs		
Plays–yards		
Rushes–yards		
Passing yards		
Passing: comp–att–int		
Turnovers		
Time of possession		

Team	Category	Player	Statistics
Stonehill	Passing		
Stonehill	Rushing		
Stonehill	Receiving		
LIU	Passing		
LIU	Rushing		
LIU	Receiving		

=== Mercyhurst ===
Mercyhurst Lakers (1–7) at Stonehill Skyhawks (3–5) – Game summary

Quarter	1	2	3	4	Total
Lakers	0	0	0	0	0
Skyhawks	0	0	0	0	0

at W.B. Mason Stadium • Easton, Massachusetts

- Date: October 31
- Game time: 12:00 p.m.

Game information

First quarter
Second quarter
Third quarter
Fourth quarter

Statistics	MERC	STO
First downs		
Plays–yards		
Rushes–yards		
Passing yards		
Passing: comp–att–int		
Turnovers		
Time of possession		

Team	Category	Player	Statistics
Mercyhurst	Passing		
Mercyhurst	Rushing		
Mercyhurst	Receiving		
Stonehill	Passing		
Stonehill	Rushing		
Stonehill	Receiving		

=== Central Connecticut ===
Central Connecticut Blue Devils (5–3) at Stonehill Skyhawks (4–5) – Game summary

Quarter	1	2	3	4	Total
Blue Devils	0	0	0	0	0
Skyhawks	0	0	0	0	0

at W.B. Mason Stadium • Easton, Massachusetts

- Date: November 7
- Game time: 1:00 p.m.

Game information

First quarter
Second quarter
Third quarter
Fourth quarter

Statistics	CCSU	STO
First downs		
Plays–yards		
Rushes–yards		
Passing yards		
Passing: comp–att–int		
Turnovers		
Time of possession		

Team	Category	Player	Statistics
Central Connecticut	Passing		
Central Connecticut	Rushing		
Central Connecticut	Receiving		
Stonehill	Passing		
Stonehill	Rushing		
Stonehill	Receiving		

=== at Robert Morris ===
Stonehill Skyhawks (4–6) at Robert Morris Colonials (5–5) – Game summary

Quarter	1	2	3	4	Total
Skyhawks	0	0	0	0	0
Colonials	0	0	0	0	0

at Joe Walton Stadium • Moon Township, Pennsylvania

- Date: November 14
- Game time: 12:00 p.m.

Game information

First quarter
Second quarter
Third quarter
Fourth quarter

Statistics	STO	RMU
First downs		
Plays–yards		
Rushes–yards		
Passing yards		
Passing: comp–att–int		
Turnovers		
Time of possession		

Team	Category	Player	Statistics
Stonehill	Passing		
Stonehill	Rushing		
Stonehill	Receiving		
Robert Morris	Passing		
Robert Morris	Rushing		
Robert Morris	Receiving		

=== Wagner ===
Wagner Seahawks (3–8) at Stonehill Skyhawks (4–7) – Game summary

Quarter	1	2	3	4	Total
Seahawks	0	0	0	0	0
Skyhawks	0	0	0	0	0

at W.B. Mason Stadium • Easton, Massachusetts

- Date: November 21
- Game time: 12:00 p.m.

Game information

First quarter
Second quarter
Third quarter
Fourth quarter

Statistics	WAG	STO
First downs		
Plays–yards		
Rushes–yards		
Passing yards		
Passing: comp–att–int		
Turnovers		
Time of possession		

Team	Category	Player	Statistics
Wagner	Passing		
Wagner	Rushing		
Wagner	Receiving		
Stonehill	Passing		
Stonehill	Rushing		
Stonehill	Receiving		
