= 2026 Mercyhurst Lakers football team =

American college football season

2026 Mercyhurst Lakers football
- Conference: Northeast Conference
- Record: 2–10 (1–6 NEC)
- Head coach: Thomas Sydeski (1st season)
- Defensive coordinator: Bryce Dempsey (1st season)
- Home stadium: Saxon Stadium

2026 Northeast Conference football standings
	Conf.			Overall
Team	W		L	W		L
Central Connecticut +	5	–	1	6	–	4
Robert Morris	4	–	2	6	–	5
Duquesne	4	–	2	5	–	5
LIU	4	–	2	4	–	7
Stonehill	3	–	3	4	–	7
Wagner	2	–	4	3	–	8
New Haven*	2	–	4	3	–	8
Mercyhurst*	0	–	6	1	–	10
+ – Conference co-champions; ^ – FCS playoff participant; * – Ineligible for NEC title and FCS postseason play due to transition from NCAA Division II.; As of November 21, 2026; Rankings from STATS Poll

The 2026 Mercyhurst Lakers football team represented Mercyhurst University as a member of the Northeast Conference (NEC) during the 2026 NCAA Division I FCS football season. The Lakers were led by first-year head coach Thomas Sydeski who was promoted from offensive coordinator after former coach Ryan Riemedio left the program to become the defensive coordinator at Youngstown State.

== Preseason ==
=== NEC poll ===
The Northeast Conference released their preseason poll on August 3, 2026. The Lakers were picked to finish fifth.

== Schedule ==
Date	Time	Opponent	Site	TV	Result	Attendance
August 27	6:00 p.m.	at No. 9 Youngstown State*	Stambaugh Stadium; Youngstown, OH	ESPN+	L 10–43	8,214
September 5	7:00 p.m.	at New Mexico State*	Aggie Memorial Stadium; Las Cruces, NM	ESPN+	L 14–51	9,189
September 12	4:00 p.m.	at New Mexico*	University Stadium; Albuquerque, NM	MW+	L 7–70	23,874
September 19	1:00 p.m.	Glenville State*^{†}	Saxon Stadium; Erie, PA	NEC Front Row	W 49–20	2,504
September 26	7:00 p.m.	at Western Kentucky*	Houchens Industries–L. T. Smith Stadium; Bowling Green, KY	ESPN+	L 7–52	17,247
October 3	12:00 p.m.	at LIU	Bethpage Federal Credit Union Stadium; Brookville, NY	ESPN+	L 24–27	1,000
October 17	12:00 p.m.	Central Connecticut	Saxon Stadium; Erie, PA	NEC Front Row	L 40–43	1,204
October 24	2:00 p.m.	at Robert Morris	Joe Walton Stadium; Moon Township, PA	NEC Front Row	L 14–28	1,451
October 31	12:00 p.m.	at Stonehill	W.B. Mason Stadium; Easton, MA	NEC Front Row	L 28–34	550
November 7	12:00 p.m.	Wagner	Saxon Stadium; Erie, PA	NEC Front Row	L 28–33	1,197
November 14	12:00 p.m.	at Duquesne	Rooney Field; Pittsburgh, PA	NEC Front Row	L 10–20	1,444
November 21	12:00 p.m.	New Haven	Saxon Stadium; Erie, PA	NEC Front Row	W 31–13	1,498
*Non-conference game; ^{†}Homecoming; Rankings from STATS Poll released prior to the game; All times are in Eastern time; Source:

== Game summaries ==
=== at No. 9 Youngstown State ===
Mercyhurst Lakers (0–0) at No. 9 Youngstown State Penguins (0–0) – Game summary

Quarter	1	2	3	4	Total
Lakers	3	0	0	7	10
No. 9 Penguins	7	22	7	7	43

at Stambaugh Stadium • Youngstown, Ohio

- Date: August 27
- Game time: 6:00 p.m.
- Game weather: Cloudy • Temperature: 78 °F (26 °C) • Wind: NW at 8 miles per hour (13 km/h)
- Game attendance: 8,214
- Referee: John Shay
- TV announcers (ESPN+): Drae Smith and Kyle Sirl

Game information

First quarter

- MERC – Rocco Marcantonio 24-yard field goal, 9:38. Lakers 3–0. Drive: 10 plays, 63 yards, 5:22.
- YSU – Beau Brungard 5-yard run (Andrew Lastovka kick), 3:59. Penguins 7–3. Drive: 12 plays, 72 yards, 5:33.

Second quarter

- YSU – Lynn Wyche-El 11-yard pass from Beau Brungard (Beau Brungard–Max Welter pass), 13:31. Penguins 15–3. Drive: 5 plays, 76 yards, 2:23.
- YSU – Jaden Gilbert 24-yard run (Andrew Lastovka kick), 5:13. Penguins 22–3. Drive: 10 plays, 82 yards, 6:06.
- YSU – Beau Brungard 9-yard run (Andrew Lastovka kick), 0:23. Penguins 29–3. Drive: 9 plays, 52 yards, 1:49.

Third quarter

- YSU – Bryan Hunt 27-yard pass from Beau Brungard (Andrew Lastovka kick), 9:40. Penguins 36–3. Drive: 10 plays, 77 yards, 5:13.

Fourth quarter

- YSU – Jaden Gilbert 8-yard pass from Beau Brungard (Andrew Lastovka kick), 9:52. Penguins 43–3. Drive: 7 plays, 82 yards, 3:43.
- MERC – Sha'lik Hampton 2-yard pass from Alex Gevaudan (Rocco Marcantonio kick), 1:50. Penguins 43–10. Drive: 5 plays, 53 yards, 1:54.

Statistics	MERC	YSU
First downs	16	27
Plays–yards	51–241	66–484
Rushes–yards	20–29	36–252
Passing yards	212	232
Passing: comp–att–int	18–31–2	20–30–1
Turnovers	2	1
Time of possession	27:26	32:34

Team	Category	Player	Statistics
Mercyhurst	Passing	Alex Gevaudan	18/31, 212 yards, TD, 2 INT
Mercyhurst	Rushing	Jameir Gamble	9 carries, 36 yards
Mercyhurst	Receiving	Camden Lewis	3 receptions, 44 yards
Youngstown State	Passing	Beau Brungard	20/29, 232 yards, 3 TD, INT
Youngstown State	Rushing	Beau Brungard	21 carries, 119 yards, 2 TD
Youngstown State	Receiving	Antuan Gardner	2 receptions, 52 yards

=== at New Mexico State (FBS) ===
Mercyhurst Lakers (0–1) at New Mexico State Aggies (FBS) (0–0) – Game summary

Quarter	1	2	3	4	Total
Lakers	7	7	0	0	14
Aggies (FBS)	13	10	7	21	51

at Aggie Memorial Stadium • Las Cruces, New Mexico

- Date: September 5
- Game time: 7:00 p.m.
- Game weather: Sunny • Temperature: 90 °F (32 °C) • Wind: W at 8 miles per hour (13 km/h)
- Game attendance: 9,189
- Referee: Reed Brotherton
- TV announcers (ESPN+): MJ Newsom, Danny Knee and Wes Bryant

Game information

First quarter

- NMSU – Nick Session 26-yard interception return (Ilya Uvaydov kick), 14:46. Aggies 7–0.
- MERC – Byron Caldwell Jr. 2-yard run (Rocco Marcantonio kick), 8:03. Tied 7–7. Drive: 11 plays, 75 yards, 6:43.
- NMSU – TJ Washington Jr. 16-yard run (Ilya Uvaydov kick BLOCKED), 1:24. Aggies 13–7. Drive: 5 plays, 65 yards, 2:45.

Second quarter

- MERC – Camden Lewis 14-yard pass from Alex Gevaudan (Rocco Marcantonio kick), 12:44. Lakers 14–13. Drive: 6 plays, 70 yards, 3:35.
- NMSU – Ilya Uvaydov 39-yard field goal, 7:59. Aggies 16–14. Drive: 7 plays, 51 yards, 2:59.
- NMSU – James Jones 46-yard run (Ilya Uvaydov kick), 5:19. Aggies 23–14. Drive: 2 plays, 48 yards, 0:29.

Third quarter

- NMSU – TJ Washington Jr. 1-yard run (Ilya Uvaydov kick), 7:42. Aggies 30–14. Drive: 10 plays, 55 yards, 4:18.

Fourth quarter

- NMSU – James Jones 2-yard pass from Trey Hedden (Ilya Uvaydov kick), 14:56. Aggies 37–14. Drive: 9 plays, 64 yards, 4:43.
- NMSU – Terrione Graves 83-yard pass from Trey Hedden (Ilya Uvaydov kick), 12:32. Aggies 44–14. Drive: 1 play, 83 yards, 0:19.
- NMSU – AJ Williams III 23-yard pass from Adam Damante (Ilya Uvaydov kick), 4:29. Aggies 51–14. Drive: 8 plays, 66 yards, 4:23.

Statistics	MERC	NMSU
First downs	14	20
Plays–yards	58–237	65–530
Rushes–yards	27–70	42–235
Passing yards	167	295
Passing: comp–att–int	16–31–2	14–23–0
Turnovers	2	0
Time of possession	30:46	29:14

Team	Category	Player	Statistics
Mercyhurst	Passing	Alex Gevaudan	13/21, 147 yards, TD, INT
Mercyhurst	Rushing	Jameir Gamble	12 carries, 59 yards
Mercyhurst	Receiving	Evan Van Dyke	4 receptions, 60 yards
New Mexico State	Passing	Trey Hedden	11/20, 253 yards, 2 TD
New Mexico State	Rushing	James Jones	19 carries, 137 yards, TD
New Mexico State	Receiving	TK King	3 receptions, 94 yards

=== at New Mexico (FBS) ===
Mercyhurst Lakers (0–2) at New Mexico Lobos (FBS) (1–0) – Game summary

Quarter	1	2	3	4	Total
Lakers	7	0	0	0	7
Lobos (FBS)	7	42	14	7	70

at University Stadium • Albuquerque, New Mexico

- Date: September 12
- Game time: 4:00 p.m.
- Game weather: Sunny, 93 °F (34 °C), NW winds 7 miles per hour (11 km/h)
- Game attendance: 23,874
- Referee: Zachary Erdmann
- TV announcers (MW+): Robert Portnoy and DonTrell Moore

Game information

First quarter

- UNM – Luke Moga 1-yard run (Grant Glasgow kick), 0:27. New Mexico 7–0. Drive: 6 plays, 40 yards, 3:31.
- MER – Speedy Yancey 75-yard pass from Anthony Wolter (Rocco Marcantonio kick), 0:13. Tied 7–7. Drive: 1 play, 75 yards, 0:14.

Second quarter

- UNM – Kiefer Sibley 36-yard run (Grant Glasgow kick), 14:14. New Mexico 14–7. Drive: 4 plays, 69 yards, 0:52.
- UNM – Cade Keith 42-yard pass from Luke Moga (Grant Glasgow kick), 13:09. New Mexico 21–7. Drive: 3 plays, 47 yards, 0:18.
- UNM – Scottre Humphrey 2-yard run (Grant Glasgow kick), 12:19. New Mexico 28–7. Drive: 2 plays, 4 yards, 0:43.
- UNM – Troy Omeire 64-yard pass from Toa Fa'avae (Grant Glasgow kick), 9:14. New Mexico 35–7. Drive: 2 plays, 68 yards, 0:51.
- UNM – Toa Fa'avae 26-yard run (Grant Glasgow kick), 6:57. New Mexico 42–7. Drive: 2 plays, 26 yards, 0:15.
- UNM – Scottre Humphrey 3-yard run (Grant Glasgow kick), 0:50. New Mexico 49–7. Drive: 5 plays, 55 yards, 0:50.

Third quarter

- UNM – Deshaun Buchanan 5-yard run (Nicholas Romero kick), 10:46. New Mexico 56–7. Drive: 1 play, 5 yards, 0:05.
- UNM – DJ Darling 35-yard pass from Luke Moga (Nicholas Romero kick), 9:11. New Mexico 63–7. Drive: 1 play, 35 yards, 0:08.

Fourth quarter

- UNM – Jerod Terry Jr. 8-yard run (Nicholas Romero kick), 5:41. New Mexico 70–7. Drive: 7 plays, 50 yards, 4:16.

Statistics	MERC	UNM
First downs	10	23
Plays–yards	55–155	70–460
Rushes–yards	28–18	52–287
Passing yards	137	173
Passing: comp–att–int	13–27–4	7–18–0
Turnovers	6	0
Time of possession	26:27	33:33

Team	Category	Player	Statistics
Mercyhurst	Passing	Anthony Wolter	9/20, 111 yards, TD, 3 INT
Mercyhurst	Rushing	Jameir Gamble	8 carries, 17 yards
Mercyhurst	Receiving	Speedy Yancey	1 reception, 75 yards, TD
New Mexico	Passing	Toa Fa'avae	3/9, 91 yards, TD
New Mexico	Rushing	Scottre Humphrey	15 carries, 110 yards, 2 TD
New Mexico	Receiving	Troy Omeire	2 receptions, 70 yards, TD

=== Glenville State (DII) ===
Glenville State Pioneers (DII) (1–1) at Mercyhurst Lakers (0–3) – Game summary

Quarter	1	2	3	4	Total
Pioneers (DII)	0	0	0	0	0
Lakers	0	0	0	0	0

at Saxon Stadium • Erie, Pennsylvania

- Date: September 19
- Game time: 1:00 p.m.
- Game weather: Sunny
- Game attendance: 2,504
- Referee: Dave Stewart
- TV announcers (NEC Front Row): Shawn Bednard, Gino Antimarino

Game information

First quarter

- (9:53) MERC – Mark Hawkins Jr. 59-yard fumble recovery, Rocco Marcantonio kick (Mercer 7–0)
- (0:47) MERC – Dylan Evans 64-yard pass from Alex Gevaudan, Rocco Marcantonio kick (Drive: 3 plays, 73 yards, 1:28; Mercer 14–0)

Second quarter

- (12:00) GLEN – Brody Layman 38-yard field goal (Drive: 12 plays, 50 yards, 3:00; Mercer 14–3)
- (8:00) MERC – Jameir Gamble 2-yard run, Rocco Marcantonio kick (Drive: 9 plays, 90 yards, 1:35; Mercer 21–3)
- (1:55) MERC – Braylon Beckwith 45-yard interception return, Rocco Marcantonio kick (Drive: 5 plays, 27 yards, 6:00; Mercer 28–3)
- (0:00) GLEN – Brody Layman 20-yard field goal (Drive: 13 plays, 61 yards, 1:45; Mercer 28–6)

Third quarter

- (6:40) MERC – Dylan Evans 8-yard pass from Alex Gevaudan, Rocco Marcantonio kick (Drive: 10 plays, 83 yards, 3:54; Mercer 35–6)

Fourth quarter

- (14:37) GLEN – Graylan Holland 7-yard run, Brody Layman kick (Drive: 7 plays, 78 yards, 1:21; Mercer 35–13)
- (13:55) GLEN – Kyree Bunny 54-yard pass from Maddox Bowers, Brody Layman kick (Drive: 2 plays, 51 yards, 0:28; Mercer 35–20)
- (10:58) MERC – Jayonn Saunders 17-yard interception return, Rocco Marcantonio kick (Drive: 2 plays, 5 yards, 0:33; Mercer 42–20)
- (3:16) MERC – Jameir Gamble 28-yard run, Rocco Marcantonio kick (Drive: 3 plays, 42 yards, 1:34; Mercer 49–20)

Statistics	GLEN	MERC
First downs	29	12
Plays–yards	102–473	54–331
Rushes–yards	41–122	29–152
Passing yards	351	179
Passing: comp–att–int	31–61–3	10–25–2
Turnovers	5	3
Time of possession	39:52	20:08

Team	Category	Player	Statistics
Glenville State	Passing	Maddox Bowers	21/42, 249 yards, TD, 2 INT
Glenville State	Rushing	Zavione Wood	23 carries, 106 yards
Glenville State	Receiving	Kyree Bunny	5 receptions, 98 yards, TD
Mercyhurst	Passing	Alex Gevaudan	10/25, 179 yards, 2 TD, 2 INT
Mercyhurst	Rushing	Jameir Gamble	17 carries, 105 yards, 2 TD
Mercyhurst	Receiving	Dylan Evans	4 receptions, 105 yards, 2 TD

=== at Western Kentucky (FBS) ===
Mercyhurst Lakers (1–3) at Western Kentucky Hilltoppers (0–3) – Game summary

Quarter	1	2	3	4	Total
Lakers	0	0	0	0	0
Hilltoppers (FBS)	0	0	0	0	0

at Houchens Industries–L. T. Smith Stadium • Bowling Green, Kentucky

- Date: September 26
- Game time: 7:00 p.m.
- TV: ESPN+

Game information

First quarter
Second quarter
Third quarter
Fourth quarter

Statistics	MERC	WKU
First downs		
Plays–yards		
Rushes–yards		
Passing yards		
Passing: comp–att–int		
Turnovers		
Time of possession		

Team	Category	Player	Statistics
Mercyhurst	Passing		
Mercyhurst	Rushing		
Mercyhurst	Receiving		
Western Kentucky	Passing		
Western Kentucky	Rushing		
Western Kentucky	Receiving		

=== at LIU ===
Mercyhurst Lakers (1–4) at LIU Sharks (0–5) – Game summary

Quarter	1	2	3	4	Total
Lakers	0	0	0	0	0
Sharks	0	0	0	0	0

at Bethpage Federal Credit Union Stadium • Brookville, New York

- Date: October 3
- Game time: 12:00 p.m.

Game information

First quarter
Second quarter
Third quarter
Fourth quarter

Statistics	MERC	LIU
First downs		
Plays–yards		
Rushes–yards		
Passing yards		
Passing: comp–att–int		
Turnovers		
Time of possession		

Team	Category	Player	Statistics
Mercyhurst	Passing		
Mercyhurst	Rushing		
Mercyhurst	Receiving		
LIU	Passing		
LIU	Rushing		
LIU	Receiving		

=== Central Connecticut ===
Central Connecticut Blue Devils (2–3) at Mercyhurst Lakers (1–5) – Game summary

Quarter	1	2	3	4	Total
Blue Devils	0	0	0	0	0
Lakers	0	0	0	0	0

at Saxon Stadium • Erie, Pennsylvania

- Date: October 17
- Game time: 12:00 p.m.

Game information

First quarter
Second quarter
Third quarter
Fourth quarter

Statistics	CCSU	MERC
First downs		
Plays–yards		
Rushes–yards		
Passing yards		
Passing: comp–att–int		
Turnovers		
Time of possession		

Team	Category	Player	Statistics
Central Connecticut	Passing		
Central Connecticut	Rushing		
Central Connecticut	Receiving		
Mercyhurst	Passing		
Mercyhurst	Rushing		
Mercyhurst	Receiving		

=== at Robert Morris ===
Mercyhurst Lakers (1–6) at Robert Morris Colonials (3–4) – Game summary

Quarter	1	2	3	4	Total
Lakers	0	0	0	0	0
Colonials	0	0	0	0	0

at Joe Walton Stadium • Moon Township, Pennsylvania

- Date: October 24
- Game time: 2:00 p.m.

Game information

First quarter
Second quarter
Third quarter
Fourth quarter

Statistics	MERC	RMU
First downs		
Plays–yards		
Rushes–yards		
Passing yards		
Passing: comp–att–int		
Turnovers		
Time of possession		

Team	Category	Player	Statistics
Mercyhurst	Passing		
Mercyhurst	Rushing		
Mercyhurst	Receiving		
Robert Morris	Passing		
Robert Morris	Rushing		
Robert Morris	Receiving		

=== at Stonehill ===
Mercyhurst Lakers (1–7) at Stonehill Skyhawks (3–5) – Game summary

Quarter	1	2	3	4	Total
Lakers	0	0	0	0	0
Skyhawks	0	0	0	0	0

at W.B. Mason Stadium • Easton, Massachusetts

- Date: October 31
- Game time: 12:00 p.m.

Game information

First quarter
Second quarter
Third quarter
Fourth quarter

Statistics	MERC	STO
First downs		
Plays–yards		
Rushes–yards		
Passing yards		
Passing: comp–att–int		
Turnovers		
Time of possession		

Team	Category	Player	Statistics
Mercyhurst	Passing		
Mercyhurst	Rushing		
Mercyhurst	Receiving		
Stonehill	Passing		
Stonehill	Rushing		
Stonehill	Receiving		

=== Wagner ===
Wagner Seahawks (1–8) at Mercyhurst Lakers (1–8) – Game summary

Quarter	1	2	3	4	Total
Seahawks	0	0	0	0	0
Lakers	0	0	0	0	0

at Saxon Stadium • Erie, Pennsylvania

- Date: November 7
- Game time: 12:00 p.m.

Game information

First quarter
Second quarter
Third quarter
Fourth quarter

Statistics	WAG	MERC
First downs		
Plays–yards		
Rushes–yards		
Passing yards		
Passing: comp–att–int		
Turnovers		
Time of possession		

Team	Category	Player	Statistics
Wagner	Passing		
Wagner	Rushing		
Wagner	Receiving		
Mercyhurst	Passing		
Mercyhurst	Rushing		
Mercyhurst	Receiving		

=== at Duquesne ===
Mercyhurst Lakers (1–9) at Duquesne Dukes (4–5) – Game summary

Quarter	1	2	3	4	Total
Lakers	0	0	0	0	0
Dukes	0	0	0	0	0

at Rooney Field • Pittsburgh, Pennsylvania

- Date: November 14
- Game time: 12:00 p.m.

Game information

First quarter
Second quarter
Third quarter
Fourth quarter

Statistics	MERC	DUQ
First downs		
Plays–yards		
Rushes–yards		
Passing yards		
Passing: comp–att–int		
Turnovers		
Time of possession		

Team	Category	Player	Statistics
Mercyhurst	Passing		
Mercyhurst	Rushing		
Mercyhurst	Receiving		
Duquesne	Passing		
Duquesne	Rushing		
Duquesne	Receiving		

=== New Haven ===
New Haven Chargers (3–8) at Mercyhurst Lakers (1–10) – Game summary

Quarter	1	2	3	4	Total
Chargers	0	0	0	0	0
Lakers	0	0	0	0	0

at Saxon Stadium • Erie, Pennsylvania

- Date: November 21
- Game time: 12:00 p.m.

Game information

First quarter
Second quarter
Third quarter
Fourth quarter

Statistics	NH	MERC
First downs		
Plays–yards		
Rushes–yards		
Passing yards		
Passing: comp–att–int		
Turnovers		
Time of possession		

Team	Category	Player	Statistics
New Haven	Passing		
New Haven	Rushing		
New Haven	Receiving		
Mercyhurst	Passing		
Mercyhurst	Rushing		
Mercyhurst	Receiving		
