= Loika =

Loika is a surname. Notable people with the surname include:

- Bill Loika (1922–1986), American football coach
- Pat Loika (born 1979), American podcaster and photographer

== See also ==
- Jukka Loikas (born 1966), Finnish wrestler
