= 2026 Central Connecticut Blue Devils football team =

American college football season

2026 Central Connecticut Blue Devils football
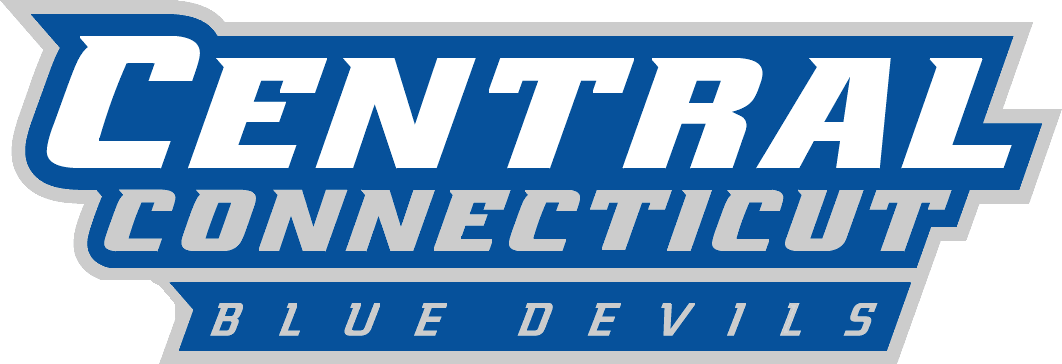

NEC co-champion
- Conference: Northeast Conference
- Record: 6–5 (5–2 NEC)
- Head coach: Adam Lechtenberg (4th season)
- Offensive coordinator: Caleb Gelsomino (4th season)
- Defensive coordinator: Ron DiGravio (8th season)
- Home stadium: Arute Field

2026 Northeast Conference football standings
	Conf.			Overall
Team	W		L	W		L
LIU +^	5	–	2	5	–	7
Duquesne +	5	–	2	6	–	5
Central Connecticut +	5	–	2	6	–	5
Robert Morris	4	–	3	6	–	6
Wagner	3	–	4	4	–	8
Stonehill	3	–	4	4	–	8
New Haven*	2	–	5	3	–	9
Mercyhurst*	1	–	6	2	–	10
+ – Conference co-champions; ^ – FCS playoff participant; * – Ineligible for NEC title and FCS postseason play due to transition from NCAA Division II.; As of November 22, 2026; Rankings from STATS Poll

The 2026 Central Connecticut Blue Devils football team will represent Central Connecticut State University (CCSU) as a member of the Northeast Conference during the 2026 NCAA Division I FCS football season. The Blue Devils will be led by fourth-year head coach Adam Lechtenberg and play home games at Arute Field in New Britain, Connecticut.

== Preseason ==
=== NEC poll ===
The Northeast Conference released their preseason poll on August 3, 2026. The Blue Devils were picked to finish in first place.

== Schedule ==
Date	Time	Opponent	Site	TV	Result	Attendance
August 29	2:00 p.m.	at No. 12 South Dakota*	DakotaDome; Vermillion, SD	ESPN+	L 20–59	7,168
September 12	3:30 p.m.	at Toledo*	Glass Bowl; Toledo, OH	ESPN+	L 10–63	18,435
September 19	3:00 p.m.	at No. 1 Montana State*	Bobcat Stadium; Bozeman, MT	ESPN+	L 30–35	21,557
October 3	12:00 p.m.	Wagner	Arute Field; New Britain, CT	NEC Front Row	W 45–14	3,333
October 10	12:00 p.m.	American International*	Arute Field; New Britain, CT	NEC Front Row	W 51–14	4,222
October 17	12:00 p.m.	at Mercyhurst	Saxon Stadium; Erie, PA	NEC Front Row	W 43–40	1,204
October 24	12:00 p.m.	New Haven	Arute Field; New Britain, CT	NEC Front Row	W 42–20	3,109
October 31	12:00 p.m.	Robert Morris	Arute Field; New Britain, CT	NEC Front Row	W 49–14	2,049
November 7	1:00 p.m.	at Stonehill	W.B. Mason Stadium; Easton, MA	ESPN+/NESN+	W 31–7	1,337
November 14	12:00 p.m.	at LIU	Bethpage Federal Credit Union Stadium; Brookville, NY	NEC Front Row	L 14–20	742
November 21	12:00 p.m.	Duquesne	Arute Field; New Britain, CT	NEC Front Row	L 17–24	2,611
*Non-conference game; Rankings from STATS Poll released prior to the game; All times are in Eastern time; Source:

== Game summaries ==
=== at No. 12 South Dakota ===
Central Connecticut Blue Devils (0–0) at No. 12 South Dakota Coyotes (0–0) – Game summary

Quarter	1	2	3	4	Total
Blue Devils	7	3	7	3	20
No. 12 Coyotes	14	28	14	3	59

at DakotaDome, Vermillion, SD

- Date: August 29
- Game time: 2:00 p.m.
- Game weather: Indoors; 70 °F (21 °C)
- Game attendance: 7,168
- Referee: Grant Henderson
- TV announcers (Midco SN, ESPN+, Midco+): David Brown and Andre Fields

Game information

First quarter

- CCSU – Isaac Stopke 3-yard run (Jack Hennessey kick), 7:40. Blue Devils 7–0. Drive: 10 plays, 63 yards, 5:48.
- SDAK – Brayden White 7-yard pass from Austyn Modrzewski (Bohdie Ing kick), 2:27. Tied 7–7. Drive: 8 plays, 69 yards, 5:07.
- SDAK – Austyn Modrzewksi 68-yard run (Bohdie Ing kick), 0:50. Coyotes 14–7. Dirve: 1 play, 68 yards, 0:11.

Second quarter

- SDAK – Keyondray Jones-Logan 61-yard pass from Austyn Modrzewski (Bohdie Ing kick), 13:09. Coyotes 21–7. Drive: 2 plays, 64 yards, 0:55.
- CCSU – Jack Hennessey 37-yard field goal, 9:37. Coyotes 21–10. Drive: 6 plays, 14 yards, 2:55.
- SDAK – Carson Fletcher 24-yard run (Bohdie Ing kick), 7:23. Coyotes 28–10. Drive: 4 plays, 48 yards, 2:10.
- SDAK – Chris Herrin 23-yard pass from Austyn Modrzewski (Bohdie Ing kick), 3:27. Coyotes 35–10. Drive: 5 plays, 61 yards, 2:30.
- SDAK – Jesse Miller 2-yard pass from Austyn Modrzewski (Bohdie Ing kick), 0:07. Coyotes 42–10. Drive: 12 plays, 65 yards, 1:47.

Third quarter

- SDAK – Brayden White 38-yard pass from Austyn Modrzewski (Bohdie Ing kick), 11:52. Coyotes 49–10. Drive: 3 plays, 57 yards, 1:35.
- SDAK – Tennel Bryant 49-yard pass from Austyn Modrzewski (Bohdie Ing kick), 7:04. Coyotes 56–10. Drive: 5 plays, 80 yards, 2:45.
- CCSU – Michael Trovarelli 13-yard pass from Conner Kenyon (Jack Hennessey kick), 1:28. Coyotes 56–17. Drive: 12 plays, 74 yards, 5:30.

Fourth quarter

- SDAK – Bohdie Ing 30-yard field goal, 11:12. Coyotes 59–17. Drive: 11 plays, 63 yards, 5:16.
- CCSU – Jack Hennessey 36-yard field goal, 6:11. Coyotes 59–20. Drive: 10 plays, 46 yards, 4:58.

Statistics	CCSU	SDAK
First downs	15	25
Plays–yards	64–250	57–594
Rushes–yards	33–135	33–267
Passing yards	115	327
Passing: comp–att–int	16–31–0	18–24–0
Turnovers	0	1
Time of possession	32:36	27:24

Team	Category	Player	Statistics
Central Connecticut	Passing	Conner Kenyon	9/18, 81 yards, TD
Central Connecticut	Rushing	Brett Griffis	8 carries, 43 yards
Central Connecticut	Receiving	Michael Trovarelli	5 receptions, 45 yards, TD
South Dakota	Passing	Austyn Modrzewski	16/20, 304 yards, 6 TD
South Dakota	Rushing	Austyn Modrzewski	2 carries, 81 yards, TD
South Dakota	Receiving	Keyondray Jones-Logan	2 receptions, 103 yards, TD

=== at Toledo (FBS) ===
Central Connecticut Blue Devils (0–1) at Toledo Rockets (FBS) (0–1) – Game summary

Quarter	1	2	3	4	Total
Blue Devils	3	0	0	7	10
Rockets (FBS)	14	21	21	7	63

at Glass Bowl • Toledo, Ohio

- Date: September 12
- Game time: 3:30 p.m.
- Game weather: Cloudy • Temperature: 81 °F (27 °C) • Wind: SW at 7 miles per hour (11 km/h)
- Game attendance: 18,435
- Referee: Chris LaMange
- TV announcers (ESPN+): Bill Spaulding and Doc Holliday

Game information

First quarter

- CCSU – Jack Hennessey 25-yard field goal, 14:36. Blue Devils 3–0. Drive: 4 plays, 0 yards, 0:17.
- TOL – Connor Walendzak 4-yard pass from John Alan Richter (Reice Griffith kick), 10:57. Rockets 7–3. Drive: 8 plays, 64 yards, 3:31.
- TOL – Rico Bond 85-yard pass from John Alan Richter (Reice Griffith kick), 0:52. Rockets 14–3. Drive: 1 plays, 85 yards, 0:09.

Second quarter

- TOL – Autavius Ison 3-yard run (Reice Griffith kick), 12:07. Rockets 21–3. Drive: 6 plays, 27 yards, 2:49.
- TOL – CJ Miller 14-yard run (Reice Griffith kick), 8:35. Rockets 28–3. Drive: 7 plays, 53 yards, 1:51.
- TOL – Hayden Roy 0-yard blocked punt return (Reice Griffith kick), 1:23. Rockets 35–3.

Third quarter

- TOL – Adjatay Dabbs 4-yard pass from John Alan Richter (Reice Griffith kick), 9:49. Rockets 42–3. Drive: 10 plays, 58 yards, 4:13.
- TOL – Connor Walendzak 1-yard run (Reice Griffith kick), 5:16. Rockets 49–3. Drive: 5 plays, 50 yards, 2:11.
- TOL – Khamoni Robinson 38-yard run (Reice Griffith kick), 1:00. Rockets 56–3. Drive: 9 plays, 63 yards, 3:54.

Fourth quarter

- CCSU – Melvin Jacobs 14-yard interception return (Jack Hennessey kick), 12:40. Rockets 56–10.
- TOL – Cooper Rusk 40-yard pass from Walter Moses (Reice Griffith kick), 3:42. Rockets 63–10. Drive: 7 plays, 56 yards, 4:16.

Statistics	CCSU	TOL
First downs	7	28
Plays–yards	58–139	76–569
Rushes–yards	25–73	38–256
Passing yards	66	313
Passing: comp–att–int	13–33–1	18–31–1
Turnovers	1	2
Time of possession	25:57	34:03

Team	Category	Player	Statistics
Central Connecticut	Passing	Conner Kenyon	8/15, 40 yards
Central Connecticut	Rushing	Brett Griffis	5 carries, 31 yards
Central Connecticut	Receiving	Damani Williams	4 receptions, 21 yards
Toledo	Passing	John Alan Richter	15/24, 252 yards, 3 TD
Toledo	Rushing	CJ Miller	9 carries, 56 yards, TD
Toledo	Receiving	Rico Bond	4 receptions, 135 yards, TD

=== at No. 1 Montana State ===
Central Connecticut Blue Devils (0–2) at No. 1 Montana State Bobcats (3–0) – Game summary

Quarter	1	2	3	4	Total
Blue Devils	0	0	0	0	0
No. 1 Bobcats	0	0	0	0	0

at Bobcat Stadium • Bozeman, Montana

- Date: September 19
- Game time: 3:00 p.m.

Game information

First quarter
Second quarter
Third quarter
Fourth quarter

Statistics	CCSU	MTST
First downs		
Plays–yards		
Rushes–yards		
Passing yards		
Passing: comp–att–int		
Turnovers		
Time of possession		

Team	Category	Player	Statistics
Central Connecticut	Passing		
Central Connecticut	Rushing		
Central Connecticut	Receiving		
Montana State	Passing		
Montana State	Rushing		
Montana State	Receiving		

=== Wagner ===
Wagner Seahawks (1–3) at Central Connecticut Blue Devils (0–3) – Game summary

Quarter	1	2	3	4	Total
Seahawks	0	0	0	0	0
Blue Devils	0	0	0	0	0

at Arute Field • New Britain, Connecticut

- Date: October 3

Game information

First quarter
Second quarter
Third quarter
Fourth quarter

Statistics	WAG	CCSU
First downs		
Plays–yards		
Rushes–yards		
Passing yards		
Passing: comp–att–int		
Turnovers		
Time of possession		

Team	Category	Player	Statistics
Wagner	Passing		
Wagner	Rushing		
Wagner	Receiving		
Central Connecticut	Passing		
Central Connecticut	Rushing		
Central Connecticut	Receiving		

=== American International (DII) ===
American International Yellow Jackets (2–3) at Central Connecticut Blue Devils (1–3) – Game summary

Quarter	1	2	3	4	Total
Yellow Jackets (DII)	0	0	0	0	0
Blue Devils	0	0	0	0	0

at Arute Field • New Britain, Connecticut

- Date: October 10

Game information

First quarter
Second quarter
Third quarter
Fourth quarter

Statistics	AIC	CCSU
First downs		
Plays–yards		
Rushes–yards		
Passing yards		
Passing: comp–att–int		
Turnovers		
Time of possession		

Team	Category	Player	Statistics
American International	Passing		
American International	Rushing		
American International	Receiving		
Central Connecticut	Passing		
Central Connecticut	Rushing		
Central Connecticut	Receiving		

=== at Mercyhurst ===
Central Connecticut Blue Devils (2–3) at Mercyhurst Lakers (1–5) – Game summary

Quarter	1	2	3	4	Total
Blue Devils	0	0	0	0	0
Lakers	0	0	0	0	0

at Saxon Stadium • Erie, Pennsylvania

- Date: October 17
- Game time: 12:00 p.m.

Game information

First quarter
Second quarter
Third quarter
Fourth quarter

Statistics	CCSU	MERC
First downs		
Plays–yards		
Rushes–yards		
Passing yards		
Passing: comp–att–int		
Turnovers		
Time of possession		

Team	Category	Player	Statistics
Central Connecticut	Passing		
Central Connecticut	Rushing		
Central Connecticut	Receiving		
Mercyhurst	Passing		
Mercyhurst	Rushing		
Mercyhurst	Receiving		

=== New Haven ===
New Haven Chargers (2–5) at Central Connecticut Blue Devils (3–3) – Game summary

Quarter	1	2	3	4	Total
Chargers	0	0	0	0	0
Blue Devils	0	0	0	0	0

at Arute Field • New Britain, Connecticut

- Date: October 24
- Game time: 12:00 p.m.

Game information

First quarter
Second quarter
Third quarter
Fourth quarter

Statistics	NH	CCSU
First downs		
Plays–yards		
Rushes–yards		
Passing yards		
Passing: comp–att–int		
Turnovers		
Time of possession		

Team	Category	Player	Statistics
New Haven	Passing		
New Haven	Rushing		
New Haven	Receiving		
Central Connecticut	Passing		
Central Connecticut	Rushing		
Central Connecticut	Receiving		

=== Robert Morris ===
Robert Morris Colonials (4–4) at Central Connecticut Blue Devils (4–3) – Game summary

Quarter	1	2	3	4	Total
Colonials	0	0	0	0	0
Blue Devils	0	0	0	0	0

at Arute Field • New Britain, Connecticut

- Date: October 31

Game information

First quarter
Second quarter
Third quarter
Fourth quarter

Statistics	RMU	CCSU
First downs		
Plays–yards		
Rushes–yards		
Passing yards		
Passing: comp–att–int		
Turnovers		
Time of possession		

Team	Category	Player	Statistics
Robert Morris	Passing		
Robert Morris	Rushing		
Robert Morris	Receiving		
Central Connecticut	Passing		
Central Connecticut	Rushing		
Central Connecticut	Receiving		

=== at Stonehill ===
Central Connecticut Blue Devils (5–3) at Stonehill Skyhawks (4–5) – Game summary

Quarter	1	2	3	4	Total
Blue Devils	0	0	0	0	0
Skyhawks	0	0	0	0	0

at W.B. Mason Stadium • Easton, Massachusetts

- Date: November 7
- Game time: 1:00 p.m.

Game information

First quarter
Second quarter
Third quarter
Fourth quarter

Statistics	CCSU	STO
First downs		
Plays–yards		
Rushes–yards		
Passing yards		
Passing: comp–att–int		
Turnovers		
Time of possession		

Team	Category	Player	Statistics
Central Connecticut	Passing		
Central Connecticut	Rushing		
Central Connecticut	Receiving		
Stonehill	Passing		
Stonehill	Rushing		
Stonehill	Receiving		

=== at LIU ===
Central Connecticut Blue Devils (6–3) at LIU Sharks (3–7) – Game summary

Quarter	1	2	3	4	Total
Blue Devils	0	0	0	0	0
Sharks	0	0	0	0	0

at Bethpage Federal Credit Union Stadium • Brookville, New York

- Date: November 14
- Game time: 12:00 p.m.

Game information

First quarter
Second quarter
Third quarter
Fourth quarter

Statistics	CCSU	LIU
First downs		
Plays–yards		
Rushes–yards		
Passing yards		
Passing: comp–att–int		
Turnovers		
Time of possession		

Team	Category	Player	Statistics
Central Connecticut	Passing		
Central Connecticut	Rushing		
Central Connecticut	Receiving		
LIU	Passing		
LIU	Rushing		
LIU	Receiving		

=== Duquesne ===
Duquesne Dukes (5–5) at Central Connecticut Blue Devils (6–4) – Game summary

Quarter	1	2	3	4	Total
Dukes	0	0	0	0	0
Blue Devils	0	0	0	0	0

at Arute Field • New Britain, Connecticut

- Date: November 21
- Game time: 12:00 p.m.

Game information

First quarter
Second quarter
Third quarter
Fourth quarter

Statistics	DUQ	CCSU
First downs		
Plays–yards		
Rushes–yards		
Passing yards		
Passing: comp–att–int		
Turnovers		
Time of possession		

Team	Category	Player	Statistics
Duquesne	Passing		
Duquesne	Rushing		
Duquesne	Receiving		
Central Connecticut	Passing		
Central Connecticut	Rushing		
Central Connecticut	Receiving		

== Rankings ==
Ranking movements Legend: ██ Increase in ranking ██ Decrease in ranking — = Not ranked RV = Received votes
	Week														
Poll	Pre	1	2	3	4	5	6	7	8	9	10	11	12	13	Final
STATS	—	—	—	—	—	—	—	—	—	—					
Coaches	RV	—	—	—	RV	—	RV	RV	RV	RV					
