= 2026 Duquesne Dukes football team =

College football team

2026 Duquesne Dukes football

NEC co-champion
- Conference: Northeast Conference
- Record: 6–5 (5–2 NEC)
- Head coach: Jerry Schmitt (22nd season)
- Offensive coordinator: Anthony Doria (11th season)
- Defensive coordinator: Bill Nesselt (1st season)
- Home stadium: Arthur J. Rooney Athletic Field

2026 Northeast Conference football standings
	Conf.			Overall
Team	W		L	W		L
LIU +^	5	–	2	5	–	7
Duquesne +	5	–	2	6	–	5
Central Connecticut +	5	–	2	6	–	5
Robert Morris	4	–	3	6	–	6
Wagner	3	–	4	4	–	8
Stonehill	3	–	4	4	–	8
New Haven*	2	–	5	3	–	9
Mercyhurst*	1	–	6	2	–	10
+ – Conference co-champions; ^ – FCS playoff participant; * – Ineligible for NEC title and FCS postseason play due to transition from NCAA Division II.; As of November 22, 2026; Rankings from STATS Poll

The 2026 Duquesne Dukes football team will represent Duquesne University as a member of the Northeast Conference (NEC) during the 2026 NCAA Division I FCS football season. The Dukes will be led by 22nd-year head coach Jerry Schmitt and play their home games at Rooney Field in Pittsburgh.

== Schedule ==
Date	Time	Opponent	Site	TV	Result	Attendance
September 5	1:00 p.m.	at Air Force*	Falcon Stadium; USAF Academy, CO	MW+	L 0–34	26,703
September 12	2:00 p.m.	at No. 10 Youngstown State*	Stambaugh Stadium; Youngstown, OH	ESPN+	L 13–70	10,824
September 19	3:30 p.m.	at Washington State*	Martin Stadium; Pullman, WA	USA	L 7–48	28,288
September 26	12:00 p.m.	Rio Grande*	Rooney Field; Pittsburgh, PA	SportsNet Pittsburgh/NEC Front Row	W 53–0	1,763
October 10	1:00 p.m.	LIU^{†}	Rooney Field; Pittsburgh, PA	NEC Front Row	L 14–17	2,572
October 17	1:00 p.m.	at Stonehill	W. B. Mason Stadium; Easton, MA	NEC Front Row	W 14–7	3,894
October 24	12:00 p.m.	Wagner	Rooney Field; Pittsburgh, PA	NEC Front Row	W 52–21	1,304
October 31	12:00 p.m.	at New Haven	Ralph F. DellaCamera Stadium; West Haven, CT	ESPN+/SportsNet Pittsburgh	W 41–14	4,200
November 7	12:00 p.m.	Robert Morris	Rooney Field; Pittsburgh, PA	NEC Front Row	L 10–13	1,595
November 14	12:00 p.m.	Mercyhurst	Rooney Field; Pittsburgh, PA	NEC Front Row	W 20–10	1,444
November 21	12:00 p.m.	at Central Connecticut	Arute Field; New Britain, CT	NEC Front Row	W 24–17	2,611
*Non-conference game; ^{†}Homecoming; Rankings from STATS Poll released prior to the game; All times are in Eastern time

== Preseason ==
=== NEC poll ===
The Northeast Conference released their preseason coaches' poll on August 3, 2026. The Dukes were picked to finish in second place.

== Game summaries ==
=== at Air Force (FBS) ===
Duquesne Dukes (0–0) at Air Force Falcons (FBS) (0–0) – Game summary

Quarter	1	2	3	4	Total
Dukes	0	0	0	0	0
Falcons (FBS)	7	13	7	7	34

at Falcon Stadium • Air Force Academy, Colorado

- Date: September 5
- Game time: 1:00 p.m.
- Game weather: Sunny • Temperature: 84 °F (29 °C) • Wind: NE at 3 mph
- Game attendance: 26,703
- Referee: Marcus Thornton
- TV announcers (MW+): Josh Howe and Ryan Kaufman

Game information

First quarter

- AFA – Kemper Hodges 4-yard run (Carter Cremascoli kick), 8:06. Falcons 7–0. Drive: 13 plays, 75 yards, 6:54.

Second quarter

- AFA – Liam Szarka 1-yard run (Carter Cremascoli kick), 12:17. Falcons 14–0. Drive: 15 plays, 80 yards, 8:02.
- AFA – Carter Cremascoli 21-yard field goal, 9:33. Falcons 17–0. Drive: 4 plays, 6 yards, 1:09.
- AFA – Carter Cremascoli 52-yard field goal, 4:04. Falcons 20–0. Drive: 9 plays, 37 yards, 4:33.

Third quarter

- AFA – Liam Szarka 2-yard run (Carter Cremascoli kick), 1:21. Falcons 27–0. Drive: 10 plays, 84 yards, 5:30.

Fourth quarter

- AFA – Evan Medders 4-yard run (Carter Cremascoli kick), 8:19. Falcons 34–0. Drive: 14 plays, 75 yards, 6:24.

Statistics	DUQ	AFA
First downs	8	28
Plays–yards	43–107	78–450
Rushes–yards	21–54	71–431
Passing yards	53	19
Passing: comp–att–int	9–22–2	3–7–0
Turnovers	2	0
Time of possession	19:10	40:50

Team	Category	Player	Statistics
Duquesne	Passing	Carson Camp	7/18, 42 yards, 2 INT
Duquesne	Rushing	Ness Davis	11 carries, 32 yards
Duquesne	Receiving	Antwon Thomas	3 receptions, 27 yards
Air Force	Passing	Liam Szarka	3/5, 19 yards
Air Force	Rushing	Rocco Conti	10 carries, 74 yards
Air Force	Receiving	Matt Long	1 reception, 18 yards

=== at No. 10 Youngstown State ===
Duquesne Dukes (0–1) at No. 10 Youngstown State Penguins (1–1) – Game summary

Quarter	1	2	3	4	Total
Dukes	3	7	0	3	13
No. 10 Penguins	21	28	7	14	70

at Stambaugh Stadium • Youngstown, Ohio

- Date: September 12
- Game time: 2:00 p.m.
- Game weather: Rain • Temperature: 77 °F (25 °C)
- Game attendance: 10,824
- Referee: David Hergert
- TV announcers (ESPN+): Drae Smith (play-by-play) and Chris Sammarone (analyst)

Game information

First quarter

- (9:38) DUQ – Matt Clark 25-yard field goal (Drive: 11 plays, 68 yards, 5:22; Duquesne 3–0)
- (5:40) YSU – Jaden Gilbert 3 yard pass from Beau Brungard, Andrew Lastovka kick (Drive: 10 plays, 56 yards, 3:48; Youngstown State 7–3)
- (1:47) YSU – Beau Brungard 3-yard run, Andrew Lastovka kick (Drive: 4 plays, 23 yards, 2:00; Youngstown State 14–3)
- (0:00) YSU – Dorian Williams 6-yard pass from Beau Brungard, Andrew Lastovka kick (Drive: 1 play, 6 yards, 0:00; Youngstown State 21–3)

Second quarter

- (10:28) DUQ – Ryan Petras 22-yard pass from Carson Camp, Matt Clark kick (Drive: 8 plays, 75 yards, 4:32; Youngstown State 21–10)
- (9:36) YSU – Jeremiah Sanders 36-yard pass from Beau Brungard, Andrew Lastovka kick (Drive: 3 plays, 75 yards, 0:52; Youngstown State 28–10)
- (7:33) YSU – Lynn Wyche-El 9-yard pass from Beau Brungard, Andrew Lastovka kick (Drive: 3 plays, 55 yards, 1:05; Youngstown State 35–10)
- (3:14) YSU – Bryan Hunt 4-yard pass from Beau Brungard, Andrew Lastovka kick (Drive: 7 plays, 83 yards, 2:49; Youngstown State 42–10)
- (0:40) YSU – Lynn Wyche-El 23-yard pass from Beau Brungard, Andrew Lastovka kick (Drive: 6 plays, 74 yards, 1:09; Youngstown State 49–10)

Third quarter

- (7:43) YSU – Beau Brungard 1-yard run, Andrew Lastovka kick (Drive: 13 plays, 75 yards, 7:17; Youngstown State 56–10)

Fourth quarter

- (14:10) YSU – Max Welter 54-yard pass from Malachi Lewis, Andrew Lastovka kick (Drive: 4 plays, 74 yards, 0:53; Youngstown State 63–10)
- (11:09) DUQ – Matt Clark 49-yard field goal (Drive: 6 plays, 24 yards, 2:55; Youngstown State 63–13)
- (8:09) YSU – Malachi Lewis 15-yard run, Andrew Lastovka kick (Drive: 6 plays, 73 yards, 3:00; Youngstown State 70–13)

Statistics	DUQ	YSU
First downs	13	32
Plays–yards	58–244	70–603
Rushes–yards	33–155	38–196
Passing yards	89	407
Passing: comp–att–int	8–25–0	28–32–0
Turnovers	0	0
Time of possession	29:00	31:00

Team	Category	Player	Statistics
Duquesne	Passing	Carson Camp	5/19, 63 yards, TD
Duquesne	Rushing	Ness Davis	11 carries, 88 yards
Duquesne	Receiving	Ryan Petras	3 receptions, 52 yards, TD
Youngstown State	Passing	Beau Brungard	20/23, 290 yards, 6 TD
Youngstown State	Rushing	Beau Brungard	14 carries, 111 yards, 2 TD
Youngstown State	Receiving	Lynn Wyche-El	5 receptions, 77 yards, 2 TD

=== at Washington State (FBS) ===
Duquesne Dukes (0–2) at Washington State Cougars (0–2) – Game summary

Quarter	1	2	3	4	Total
Dukes	7	0	0	0	7
Cougars (FBS)	7	7	21	13	48

at Martin Stadium • Pullman, Washington

- Date: September 19
- Game time: 3:30 p.m.
- Game weather: Sunny • Temperature: 70 °F (21 °C)
- Game attendance: 28,288
- Referee: Dwayne Johnson
- TV announcers (USA): Guy Haberman, Alex Brink and Kate Harrison

Game information

First quarter

- WSU - Kirby Vorhees 8-yard run (Jack Stevens kick), 8:10. Cougars 7-0. Drive: 5 plays, 72 yards, 1:48.
- DUQ - Carson Camp 1-yard run (Matt Clark kick), 4:16. Tied 7-7. Drive: 8 plays, 75 yards, 3:54.

Second quarter

- WSU - Caden Pinnick 19-yard run (Jack Stevens kick), 4:30. Cougars 14-7. Drive: 6 plays, 43 yards, 3:00.

Third quarter

- WSU - Jack Pedersen 11-yard pass from Caden Pinnick (Jack Stevens kick), 12:01. Cougars 21-7. Drive: 6 plays, 75 yards, 2:59.
- WSU - Branden Ganashamoorthy 10-yard pass from Caden Pinnick (Jack Stevens kick), 2:27. Cougars 28-7. Drive: 10 plays, 88 yards, 5:46.
- WSU - Kirby Vorhees 58-yard run (Jack Stevens kick), 0:00. Cougars 35-7. Drive: 2 plays, 65 yards, 0:35.

Fourth quarter

- WSU - Jaylen Thomas 47-yard punt return (Jack Stevens PAT failed), 5:32. Cougars 41-7. Drive: 3 plays, 7 yards, 1:36.
- WSU - Tank Hawkins Jr. 65-yard punt return (Jack Stevens kick), 3:05. Cougars 48-7. Drive: 3 plays, 2 yards, 2:27.

Statistics	DUQ	WSU
First downs	10	26
Plays–yards	53–180	62–512
Rushes–yards	33–105	40–316
Passing yards	75	196
Passing: comp–att–int	10–20–0	17–22–1
Turnovers	0	1
Time of possession	31:44	28:16

Team	Category	Player	Statistics
Duquesne	Passing	Carson Camp	9/18, 69 yards
Duquesne	Rushing	Dazhaun Hopkins	7 carries, 60 yards
Duquesne	Receiving	Ryan Petras	4 receptions, 56 yards
Washington State	Passing	Caden Pinnick	17/22, 196 yards, 2 TD, INT
Washington State	Rushing	Maxwell Woods	11 carries, 116 yards
Washington State	Receiving	Branden Ganashamoorthy	4 receptions, 67 yards, TD

=== Rio Grande (NAIA) ===
Rio Grande RedStorm (0–3) at Duquesne Dukes (0–3) – Game summary

Quarter	1	2	3	4	Total
RedStorm (NAIA)	0	0	0	0	0
Dukes	0	0	0	0	0

at Rooney Field • Pittsburgh, Pennsylvania

- Date: September 26
- Game time: 12:00 p.m.
- TV: NEC Front Row

Game information

First quarter
Second quarter
Third quarter
Fourth quarter

Statistics	RG	DUQ
First downs		
Plays–yards		
Rushes–yards		
Passing yards		
Passing: comp–att–int		
Turnovers		
Time of possession		

Team	Category	Player	Statistics
Rio Grande	Passing		
Rio Grande	Rushing		
Rio Grande	Receiving		
Duquesne	Passing		
Duquesne	Rushing		
Duquesne	Receiving		

=== LIU ===
LIU Sharks (1–5) at Duquesne Dukes (1–3) – Game summary

Quarter	1	2	3	4	Total
Sharks	0	0	0	0	0
Dukes	0	0	0	0	0

at Rooney Field • Pittsburgh, Pennsylvania

- Date: October 10
- Game time: 1:00 p.m.
- TV: NEC Front Row

Game information

First quarter
Second quarter
Third quarter
Fourth quarter

Statistics	LIU	DUQ
First downs		
Plays–yards		
Rushes–yards		
Passing yards		
Passing: comp–att–int		
Turnovers		
Time of possession		

Team	Category	Player	Statistics
LIU	Passing		
LIU	Rushing		
LIU	Receiving		
Duquesne	Passing		
Duquesne	Rushing		
Duquesne	Receiving		

=== at Stonehill ===
Duquesne Dukes (1–4) at Stonehill Skyhawks (2–4) – Game summary

Quarter	1	2	3	4	Total
Dukes	0	0	0	0	0
Skyhawks	0	0	0	0	0

at W.B. Mason Stadium • Easton, Massachusetts

- Date: October 17
- Game time: 12:00 p.m.
- TV: NEC Front Row

Game information

First quarter
Second quarter
Third quarter
Fourth quarter

Statistics	DUQ	STO
First downs		
Plays–yards		
Rushes–yards		
Passing yards		
Passing: comp–att–int		
Turnovers		
Time of possession		

Team	Category	Player	Statistics
Duquesne	Passing		
Duquesne	Rushing		
Duquesne	Receiving		
Stonehill	Passing		
Stonehill	Rushing		
Stonehill	Receiving		

=== Wagner ===
Wagner Seahawks (1–6) at Duquesne Dukes (2–4) – Game summary

Quarter	1	2	3	4	Total
Seahawks	0	0	0	0	0
Dukes	0	0	0	0	0

at Rooney Field • Pittsburgh, Pennsylvania

- Date: October 24
- Game time: 12:00 p.m.
- TV: NEC Front Row

Game information

First quarter
Second quarter
Third quarter
Fourth quarter

Statistics	WAG	DUQ
First downs		
Plays–yards		
Rushes–yards		
Passing yards		
Passing: comp–att–int		
Turnovers		
Time of possession		

Team	Category	Player	Statistics
Wagner	Passing		
Wagner	Rushing		
Wagner	Receiving		
Duquesne	Passing		
Duquesne	Rushing		
Duquesne	Receiving		

=== at New Haven ===
Duquesne Dukes (3–4) at New Haven Chargers (2–6) – Game summary

Quarter	1	2	3	4	Total
Dukes	0	0	0	0	0
Chargers	0	0	0	0	0

at Ralph F. DellaCamera Stadium • West Haven, Connecticut

- Date: October 31
- Game time: 12:00 p.m.
- TV: ESPN+

Game information

First quarter
Second quarter
Third quarter
Fourth quarter

Statistics	DUQ	NH
First downs		
Plays–yards		
Rushes–yards		
Passing yards		
Passing: comp–att–int		
Turnovers		
Time of possession		

Team	Category	Player	Statistics
Duquesne	Passing		
Duquesne	Rushing		
Duquesne	Receiving		
New Haven	Passing		
New Haven	Rushing		
New Haven	Receiving		

=== Robert Morris ===
Robert Morris Colonials (4–5) at Duquesne Dukes (4–4) – Game summary

Quarter	1	2	3	4	Total
Colonials	0	0	0	0	0
Dukes	0	0	0	0	0

at Rooney Field • Pittsburgh, Pennsylvania

- Date: November 7
- Game time: 12:00 p.m.
- TV: NEC Front Row

Game information

First quarter
Second quarter
Third quarter
Fourth quarter

Statistics	RMU	DUQ
First downs		
Plays–yards		
Rushes–yards		
Passing yards		
Passing: comp–att–int		
Turnovers		
Time of possession		

Team	Category	Player	Statistics
Robert Morris	Passing		
Robert Morris	Rushing		
Robert Morris	Receiving		
Duquesne	Passing		
Duquesne	Rushing		
Duquesne	Receiving		

=== Mercyhurst ===
Mercyhurst Lakers (1–9) at Duquesne Dukes (4–5) – Game summary

Quarter	1	2	3	4	Total
Lakers	0	0	0	0	0
Dukes	0	0	0	0	0

at Rooney Field • Pittsburgh, Pennsylvania

- Date: November 14
- Game time: 12:00 p.m.
- TV: NEC Front Row

Game information

First quarter
Second quarter
Third quarter
Fourth quarter

Statistics	MERC	DUQ
First downs		
Plays–yards		
Rushes–yards		
Passing yards		
Passing: comp–att–int		
Turnovers		
Time of possession		

Team	Category	Player	Statistics
Mercyhurst	Passing		
Mercyhurst	Rushing		
Mercyhurst	Receiving		
Duquesne	Passing		
Duquesne	Rushing		
Duquesne	Receiving		

=== at Central Connecticut ===
Duquesne Dukes (5–5) at Central Connecticut Blue Devils (6–4) – Game summary

Quarter	1	2	3	4	Total
Dukes	0	0	0	0	0
Blue Devils	0	0	0	0	0

at Arute Field • New Britain, Connecticut

- Date: November 21
- Game time: 12:00 p.m.
- TV: NEC Front Row

Game information

First quarter
Second quarter
Third quarter
Fourth quarter

Statistics	DUQ	CCSU
First downs		
Plays–yards		
Rushes–yards		
Passing yards		
Passing: comp–att–int		
Turnovers		
Time of possession		

Team	Category	Player	Statistics
Duquesne	Passing		
Duquesne	Rushing		
Duquesne	Receiving		
Central Connecticut	Passing		
Central Connecticut	Rushing		
Central Connecticut	Receiving		
