= Bill Loika =

American football coach (1922–1986)

Biographical details
- Born: January 1, 1922; Norwich, Connecticut, U.S.
- Died: July 31, 1986 (aged 64); Niantic, Connecticut, U.S.

Coaching career (HC unless noted)
- 1947–1951: Hartford HS (CT)
- 1952–1963: Connecticut (assistant)
- 1964–1981: Central Connecticut

Head coaching record
- Overall: 94–72–3 (college); 27–9–4 (high school)

Accomplishments and honors

Championships
- 4 EFC (1967, 1972–1974)

William W. Loika (January 1, 1922 – July 31, 1986) was an American football coach. He was the sixth head football coach at Central Connecticut State University in New Britain, Connecticut, serving 18 seasons, from 1964 to 1981, and compiling a record of 94–72–3.

Loika graduated from East Hartford High School in East Hartford, Connecticut in 1939. He then attended St. Benedict's College—now known as Benedictine College—in Atchison, Kansas. Loika began his coaching career 1947 in Hartford High School in Hartford, Connecticut, where he coached football, basketball, and baseball. From 1962 to 1963, he was an assistant football coach at the University of Connecticut. Loika died of cancer on July 31, 1986, at his home in Niantic, Connecticut.

== Head coaching record ==
=== College ===
Year	Team	Overall	Conference	Standing	Bowl/playoffs
Central Connecticut Blue Devils (NCAA College Division independent) (1964)
1964	Central Connecticut	1–8			
Central Connecticut Blue Devils (Eastern Football Conference) (1965–1974)
1965	Central Connecticut	7–1			
1966	Central Connecticut	7–2			
1967	Central Connecticut	7–1		T–1st	
1968	Central Connecticut	6–2–1			
1969	Central Connecticut	5–4			
1970	Central Connecticut	5–3–1			
1971	Central Connecticut	7–3			
1972	Central Connecticut	5–5		T–1st	
1973	Central Connecticut	9–1		1st	
1974	Central Connecticut	4–5–1		1st	
Central Connecticut Blue Devils (NCAA Division II independent) (1975–1981)
1975	Central Connecticut	4–5			
1976	Central Connecticut	5–5			
1977	Central Connecticut	7–3			
1978	Central Connecticut	3–7			
1979	Central Connecticut	4–5			
1980	Central Connecticut	3–7			
1981	Central Connecticut	5–5			
Central Connecticut:		94–72–3			
Total:		94–72–3			
