= 2026 Wagner Seahawks football team =

American college football season

2026 Wagner Seahawks football
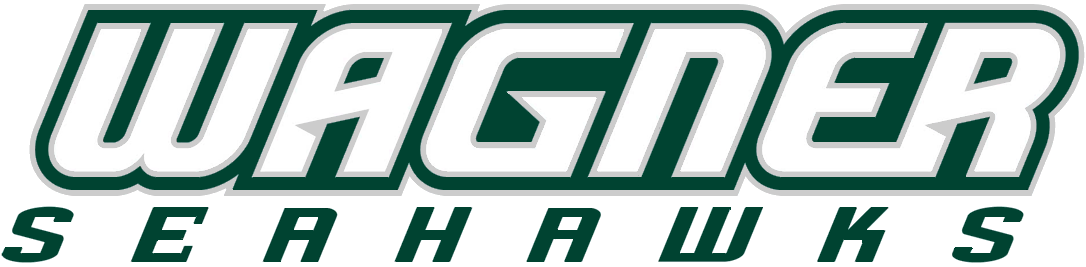
- Conference: Northeast Conference
- Record: 4–8 (3–4 NEC)
- Head coach: Tom Masella (7th season)
- Offensive coordinator: Terence Sino (2nd season)
- Home stadium: Wagner College Stadium

2026 Northeast Conference football standings
	Conf.			Overall
Team	W		L	W		L
LIU +^	5	–	2	5	–	7
Duquesne +	5	–	2	6	–	5
Central Connecticut +	5	–	2	6	–	5
Robert Morris	4	–	3	6	–	6
Wagner	3	–	4	4	–	8
Stonehill	3	–	4	4	–	8
New Haven*	2	–	5	3	–	9
Mercyhurst*	1	–	6	2	–	10
+ – Conference co-champions; ^ – FCS playoff participant; * – Ineligible for NEC title and FCS postseason play due to transition from NCAA Division II.; As of November 22, 2026; Rankings from STATS Poll

The 2026 Wagner Seahawks football team represent Wagner College as a member of the Northeast Conference (NEC) during the 2026 NCAA Division I FCS football season. The Seahawks are led by seventh-year head coach Tom Masella, and play their home games at Wagner College Stadium in Staten Island, New York.

== Schedule ==
Date	Time	Opponent	Site	TV	Result	Attendance
August 29	12:00 p.m.	Robert Morris	Wagner College Stadium; Staten Island, NY	ESPN+	L 7–28	1,757
September 5	12:00 p.m.	Southern Connecticut State*	Wagner College Stadium; Staten Island, NY	NEC Front Row	W 31–7	1,106
September 12	3:30 p.m.	at James Madison*	Bridgeforth Stadium; Harrisonburg, VA	ESPN+	L 3–87	25,028
September 19	3:30 p.m.	at California*	California Memorial Stadium; Berkeley, CA	ACCN	L 7–49	35,586
October 3	12:00 p.m.	at Central Connecticut	Arute Field; New Britain, CT	NEC Front Row	L 14–45	3,333
October 10	12:00 p.m.	Princeton*	Wagner College Stadium; Staten Island, NY	NEC Front Row	L 13–28	1,223
October 17	5:00 p.m.	LIU^{†}	Wagner College Stadium; Staten Island, NY	NEC Front Row	L 9–14	1,665
October 24	12:00 p.m.	at Duquesne	Rooney Field; Pittsburgh, PA	NEC Front Row	L 21–52	1,304
October 31	12:00 p.m.	at Merrimack*	Duane Stadium; North Andover, MA	ESPN+	L 14–19	1,245
November 7	12:00 p.m.	at Mercyhurst	Saxon Stadium; Erie, PA	NEC Front Row	W 33–28	1,197
November 14	12:00 p.m.	New Haven	Wagner College Stadium; Staten Island, NY	NEC Front Row	W 14–10	1,321
November 21	12:00 p.m.	at Stonehill	W.B. Mason Stadium; Easton, MA	NEC Front Row/NESN+	W 35–31	797
*Non-conference game; ^{†}Homecoming; All times are in Eastern time

== Game summaries ==
=== Robert Morris ===
Robert Morris Colonials (0–0) at Wagner Seahawks (0–0) – Game summary

Quarter	1	2	3	4	Total
Colonials	14	0	7	7	28
Seahawks	0	0	7	0	7

at Wagner College Stadium • Staten Island, New York

- Date: August 29
- Game time: 12:00 p.m.
- Game weather: Sunny • Temperature: 75 °F (24 °C)
- Game attendance: 1,757
- Referee: Mike Quinn
- TV announcers (ESPN+): Paul Dottino (play-by-play) and Kevin Gilbride (analyst)

Game information

First quarter

- RMU – Galen Combs 22-yard punt return (Lucca Valens kick), 9:21. Colonials 7–0.
- RMU – Jaqai Carter 6-yard pass from Carson Haggard (Lucca Valens kick), 6:51. Colonials 14–0. Drive: 4 plays, 26 yards, 2:20.

Second quarter

- No scoring plays.

Third quarter

- WAG – Julio Tatis 40-yard interception return (Johnny DiSalvatore kick), 13:18. Colonials 14–7.
- RMU – Galen Combs 64-yard pass from Carson Haggard (Lucca Valens kick), 2:03. Colonials 21–7. Drive: 3 plays, 75 yards, 1:34.

Fourth quarter

- RMU – Galen Combs 15-yard pass from Carson Haggard (Lucca Valens kick), 5:35. Colonials 28–7. Drive: 15 plays, 76 yards, 8:20.

Statistics	RMU	WAG
First downs	13	6
Plays–yards	64–285	57–97
Rushes–yards	32–79	26–22
Passing yards	206	75
Passing: comp–att–int	19–32–2	14–31–0
Turnovers	2	1
Time of possession	33:49	26:11

Team	Category	Player	Statistics
Robert Morris	Passing	Carson Haggard	19/32, 206 yards, 3 TD, 2 INT
Robert Morris	Rushing	J'Kharri Thomas	14 carries, 28 yards
Robert Morris	Receiving	Galen Combs	4 receptions, 104 yards, 2 TD
Wagner	Passing	Jack Stevens	10/19, 63 yards
Wagner	Rushing	Matt Morad	10 carries, 32 yards
Wagner	Receiving	Zion Fowler-El	4 receptions, 30 yards

=== Southern Connecticut State (DII) ===
Southern Connecticut State Owls (DII) (0–0) at Wagner Seahawks (0–1) – Game summary

Quarter	1	2	3	4	Total
Owls (DII)	0	0	0	7	7
Seahawks	14	10	0	7	31

at Wagner College Stadium • Staten Island, New York

- Date: September 5
- Game time: 12:00 p.m.
- Game weather: Sunny • Temperature: 79 °F (26 °C)
- Game attendance: 1,106
- Referee: Jonathan Grande
- TV announcers (NEC Front Row): Marc Ernay (play-by-play) and Ray Martel (analyst)

Game information

First quarter

- (5:44) WAG – Johans Bars 8-yard pass from Benjamin Newman, Giovanni Bennardo kick (Drive: 9 plays, 45 yards, 3:45; Wagner 7–0)
- (1:22) WAG – Teree McDonald 26-yard pass from Benjamin Newman, Giovanni Bennardo kick (Drive: 5 plays, 41 yards, 2:09; Wagner 14–0)

Second quarter

- (9:25) WAG – Malik Redd 30-yard pass from Benjamin Newman, Giovanni Bennardo kick (Drive: 12 plays, 95 yards, 5:19; Wagner 21–0)
- (0:00) WAG – Ryan Liszner 44-yard field goal (Drive: 7 plays, 48 yards, 1:08; Wagner 24–0)

Third quarter

No scoring plays

Fourth quarter

- (12:00) SCSU – Brandon Jorgensen 3-yard run, Daniel Benzi kick (Drive: 7 plays, 60 yards, 2:51; Wagner 24–7)
- (3:47) WAG – Matt Morad 29-yard run, Giovanni Bennardo kick (Drive: 6 plays, 55 yards, 2:48; Wagner 31–7)

Statistics	SCSU	WAG
First downs	10	22
Plays–yards	50–146	77–409
Rushes–yards	29–28	44–142
Passing yards	118	267
Passing: comp–att–int	13–21–0	23–33–0
Turnovers	1	1
Time of possession	24:23	33:34

Team	Category	Player	Statistics
Southern Connecticut State	Passing	Brandon Jorgensen	13/21, 118 yards
Southern Connecticut State	Rushing	John Amaning	16 carries, 36 yards
Southern Connecticut State	Receiving	Andres Perez	6 receptions, 66 yards
Wagner	Passing	Benjamin Newman	23/33, 267 yards, 3 TD
Wagner	Rushing	Matt Morad	21 carries, 83 yards, TD
Wagner	Receiving	Teree McDonald	2 receptions, 70 yards, TD

=== at James Madison (FBS) ===
Wagner Seahawks (1–1) at James Madison Dukes (FBS) (1–0) – Game summary

Quarter	1	2	3	4	Total
Seahawks	3	0	0	0	3
Dukes (FBS)	21	21	24	21	87

at Bridgeforth Stadium • Harrisonburg, Virginia

- Date: September 12
- Game time: 3:30 p.m.
- Game weather: Sunny
- Game attendance: 25,028
- Referee: Jeremy Parker
- TV announcers (ESPN+): Curt Dudley (play-by-play) and Brian Barlow (analyst)

Game information

First quarter

- JMU – Miles Halbert 9-yard punt return (Morgan Suarez kick), 13:31. Dukes 7–0. Drive: 3 plays, 4 yards, 1:29.
- WAG – Johnny DiSalvatore 40-yard field goal, 9:01. Dukes 7–3. Drive: 10 plays, 53 yards, 4:30.
- JMU – George Pettaway 1-yard run (Morgan Suarez kick), 7:46. Dukes 14–3. Drive: 3 plays, 5 yards, 1:01.
- JMU – George Pettaway 1-yard run (Morgan Suarez kick), 1:16. Dukes 21–3. Drive: 12 plays, 66 yards, 4:12.

Second quarter

- JMU – George Pettaway 32-yard run (Morgan Suarez kick), 13:09. Dukes 28–3. Drive: 2 plays, 34 yards, 0:36.
- JMU – Nick Herman 15-yard run (Morgan Suarez kick), 4:23. Dukes 35–3. Drive: 4 plays, 52 yards, 0:58.
- JMU – Michael Scott 76-yard punt return (Morgan Suarez kick), 1:00. Dukes 42–3. Drive: 6 plays, 14 yards, 2:07.

Third quarter

- JMU – Nick Herman 77-yard run (Morgan Suarez kick), 14:20. Dukes 49–3. Drive: 2 plays, 82 yards, 0:35.
- JMU – Michael Scott 66-yard punt return (Morgan Suarez kick), 12:04. Dukes 56–3. Drive: 3 plays, 8 yards, 2:16.
- JMU – Za'Ron Collins 18-yard pass from Camden Coleman (Morgan Suarez kick), 8:22. Dukes 63–3. Drive: 6 plays, 82 yards, 1:56.
- JMU – Morgan Suarez 46-yard field goal, 1:52. Dukes 66–3. Drive: 9 plays, 53 yards, 3:48.

Fourth quarter

- JMU – KD Mosley 20-yard pass from Arrington Maiden (Morgan Suarez kick), 14:39. Dukes 73–3. Drive: 2 plays, 39 yards, 0:27.
- JMU – Miles Halbert 44-yard pass from Arrington Maiden (Morgan Suarez kick), 6:48. Dukes 80–3. Drive: 7 plays, 81 yards, 3:14.
- JMU – Phoenix Donghia 1-yard run (Morgan Suarez kick), 0:22. Dukes 87–3. Drive: 6 plays, 70 yards, 1:50.

Statistics	WAG	JMU
First downs	10	27
Plays–yards	67–204	62–588
Rushes–yards	40–86	35–290
Passing yards	118	298
Passing: Comp–Att–Int	14–27–0	20–27–0
Turnovers	2	1
Time of possession	37:24	22:36

Team	Category	Player	Statistics
Wagner	Passing	Benjamin Newman	11/20, 101 yards
Wagner	Rushing	Uriah Moats-Maynard	14 carries, 33 yards
Wagner	Receiving	Zion Fowler-El	4 receptions, 45 yards
James Madison	Passing	Camden Coleman	12/18, 171 yards, TD
James Madison	Rushing	Nick Herman	8 carries, 132 yards, 2 TD
James Madison	Receiving	Corey Scott	3 receptions, 52 yards

=== at California (FBS) ===
Wagner Seahawks (1–2) at California Golden Bears (FBS) (1–1) – Game summary

Quarter	1	2	3	4	Total
Seahawks	0	7	0	0	7
Golden Bears (FBS)	29	10	7	3	49

at California Memorial Stadium • Berkeley, California

- Date: September 19
- Game time: 12:30 p.m. PDT
- Game weather: Sunny • Temperature: 70 °F (21 °C)
- Game attendance: 35,586
- Referee: Darryl DeBerry
- TV announcers (ACCNX): Roxy Bernstein, Dave Clawson and Madison Hock

Statistics	WAG	CAL
First downs	10	28
Plays–yards	59–198	71–626
Rushes–yards	27–112	28–134
Passing yards	86	492
Passing: comp–att–int	15–32–1	35–43–0
Turnovers	1	2
Time of possession	28:08	31:52

Team	Category	Player	Statistics
Wagner	Passing	Benjamin Newman	15/31, 86 yards, TD, INT
Wagner	Rushing	Shawn James	8 carries, 36 yards
Wagner	Receiving	Jeremiah Colclough	3 receptions, 24 yards
California	Passing	Jaron-Keawe Sagapolutele	27/33, 413 yards, 3 TD
California	Rushing	Adam Mohammed	13 carries, 91 yards, 2 TD
California	Receiving	Kylon Grayes	3 receptions, 98 yards, TD

=== at Central Connecticut ===
Wagner Seahawks (1–3) at Central Connecticut Blue Devils (0–3) – Game summary

Quarter	1	2	3	4	Total
Seahawks	0	0	0	0	0
Blue Devils	0	0	0	0	0

at Arute Field • New Britain, Connecticut

- Date: October 3
- Game time: 12:00 p.m.

Game information

First quarter
Second quarter
Third quarter
Fourth quarter

Statistics	WAG	CCSU
First downs		
Plays–yards		
Rushes–yards		
Passing yards		
Passing: comp–att–int		
Turnovers		
Time of possession		

Team	Category	Player	Statistics
Wagner	Passing		
Wagner	Rushing		
Wagner	Receiving		
Central Connecticut	Passing		
Central Connecticut	Rushing		
Central Connecticut	Receiving		

=== Princeton ===
Princeton Tigers (2–1) at Wagner Seahawks (1–4) – Game summary

Quarter	1	2	3	4	Total
Tigers	0	0	0	0	0
Seahawks	0	0	0	0	0

at Wagner College Stadium • Staten Island, New York

- Date: October 10
- Game time: 12:00 p.m.

Game information

First quarter
Second quarter
Third quarter
Fourth quarter

Statistics	PRIN	WAG
First downs		
Plays–yards		
Rushes–yards		
Passing yards		
Passing: comp–att–int		
Turnovers		
Time of possession		

Team	Category	Player	Statistics
Princeton	Passing		
Princeton	Rushing		
Princeton	Receiving		
Wagner	Passing		
Wagner	Rushing		
Wagner	Receiving		

=== LIU ===
LIU Sharks (2–5) at Wagner Seahawks (1–5) – Game summary

Quarter	1	2	3	4	Total
Sharks	0	0	0	0	0
Seahawks	0	0	0	0	0

at Wagner College Stadium • Staten Island, New York

- Date: October 17
- Game time: 5:00 p.m.

Game information

First quarter
Second quarter
Third quarter
Fourth quarter

Statistics	LIU	WAG
First downs		
Plays–yards		
Rushes–yards		
Passing yards		
Passing: comp–att–int		
Turnovers		
Time of possession		

Team	Category	Player	Statistics
LIU	Passing		
LIU	Rushing		
LIU	Receiving		
Wagner	Passing		
Wagner	Rushing		
Wagner	Receiving		

=== at Duquesne ===
Wagner Seahawks (1–6) at Duquesne Dukes (2–4) – Game summary

Quarter	1	2	3	4	Total
Seahawks	0	0	0	0	0
Dukes	0	0	0	0	0

at Rooney Field • Pittsburgh, Pennsylvania

- Date: October 24
- Game time: 12:00 p.m.

Game information

First quarter
Second quarter
Third quarter
Fourth quarter

Statistics	WAG	DUQ
First downs		
Plays–yards		
Rushes–yards		
Passing yards		
Passing: comp–att–int		
Turnovers		
Time of possession		

Team	Category	Player	Statistics
Wagner	Passing		
Wagner	Rushing		
Wagner	Receiving		
Duquesne	Passing		
Duquesne	Rushing		
Duquesne	Receiving		

=== at Merrimack ===
Wagner Seahawks (1–0) at Merrimack Warriors (3–5) – Game summary

Quarter	1	2	3	4	Total
Seahawks	0	0	0	0	0
Warriors	0	0	0	0	0

at Duane Stadium • North Andover, Massachusetts

- Date: October 31
- Game time: 12:00 p.m.

Game information

First quarter
Second quarter
Third quarter
Fourth quarter

Statistics	WAG	MRMK
First downs		
Plays–yards		
Rushes–yards		
Passing yards		
Passing: comp–att–int		
Turnovers		
Time of possession		

Team	Category	Player	Statistics
Wagner	Passing		
Wagner	Rushing		
Wagner	Receiving		
Merrimack	Passing		
Merrimack	Rushing		
Merrimack	Receiving		

=== at Mercyhurst ===
Wagner Seahawks (1–8) at Mercyhurst Lakers (1–8) – Game summary

Quarter	1	2	3	4	Total
Seahawks	0	0	0	0	0
Lakers	0	0	0	0	0

at Saxon Stadium • Erie, Pennsylvania

- Date: November 7
- Game time: 12:00 p.m.

Game information

First quarter
Second quarter
Third quarter
Fourth quarter

Statistics	WAG	MERC
First downs		
Plays–yards		
Rushes–yards		
Passing yards		
Passing: comp–att–int		
Turnovers		
Time of possession		

Team	Category	Player	Statistics
Wagner	Passing		
Wagner	Rushing		
Wagner	Receiving		
Mercyhurst	Passing		
Mercyhurst	Rushing		
Mercyhurst	Receiving		

=== New Haven ===
New Haven Chargers (3–7) at Wagner Seahawks (2–8) – Game summary

Quarter	1	2	3	4	Total
Chargers	0	0	0	0	0
Seahawks	0	0	0	0	0

at Wagner College Stadium • Staten Island, New York

- Date: November 14
- Game time: 12:00 p.m.

Game information

First quarter
Second quarter
Third quarter
Fourth quarter

Statistics	NH	WAG
First downs		
Plays–yards		
Rushes–yards		
Passing yards		
Passing: comp–att–int		
Turnovers		
Time of possession		

Team	Category	Player	Statistics
New Haven	Passing		
New Haven	Rushing		
New Haven	Receiving		
Wagner	Passing		
Wagner	Rushing		
Wagner	Receiving		

=== at Stonehill ===
Wagner Seahawks (3–8) at Stonehill Skyhawks (4–7) – Game summary

Quarter	1	2	3	4	Total
Seahawks	0	0	0	0	0
Skyhawks	0	0	0	0	0

at W.B. Mason Stadium • Easton, Massachusetts

- Date: November 21
- Game time: 12:00 p.m.

Game information

First quarter
Second quarter
Third quarter
Fourth quarter

Statistics	WAG	STO
First downs		
Plays–yards		
Rushes–yards		
Passing yards		
Passing: comp–att–int		
Turnovers		
Time of possession		

Team	Category	Player	Statistics
Wagner	Passing		
Wagner	Rushing		
Wagner	Receiving		
Stonehill	Passing		
Stonehill	Rushing		
Stonehill	Receiving		
