= Central Connecticut Blue Devils football =

Football program representing Central Connecticut State University

Central Connecticut Blue Devils
2026 Central Connecticut Blue Devils football team
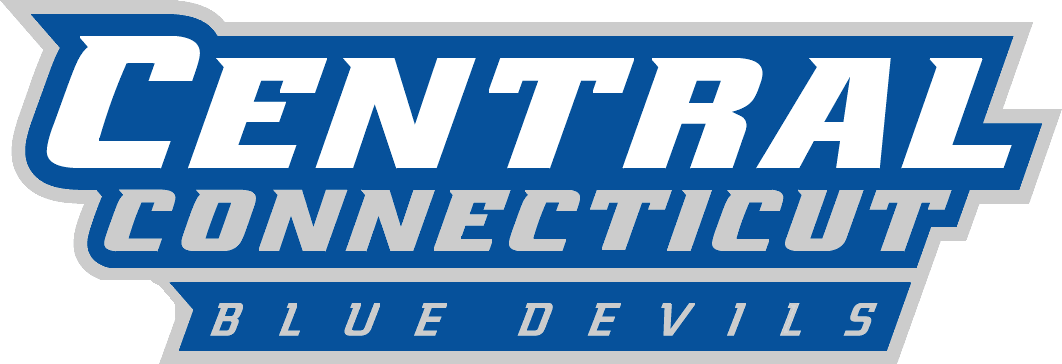
- First season: 1935; 91 years ago
- Athletic director: Thomas Pincince
- Head coach: Adam Lechtenberg; 3rd season, 18–19 (.486)
- Location: New Britain, Connecticut
- Stadium: Arute Field (capacity: 5,500)
- NCAA division: Division I FCS
- Conference: NEC
- Colors: Blue and white
- All-time record: 362–412–21 (.469)

Conference championships
- EFC: 1967, 1972, 1973, 1974 NEC: 2004, 2005, 2009, 2010, 2017, 2019, 2024, 2025, 2026
- Website: CCSUBlueDevils.com

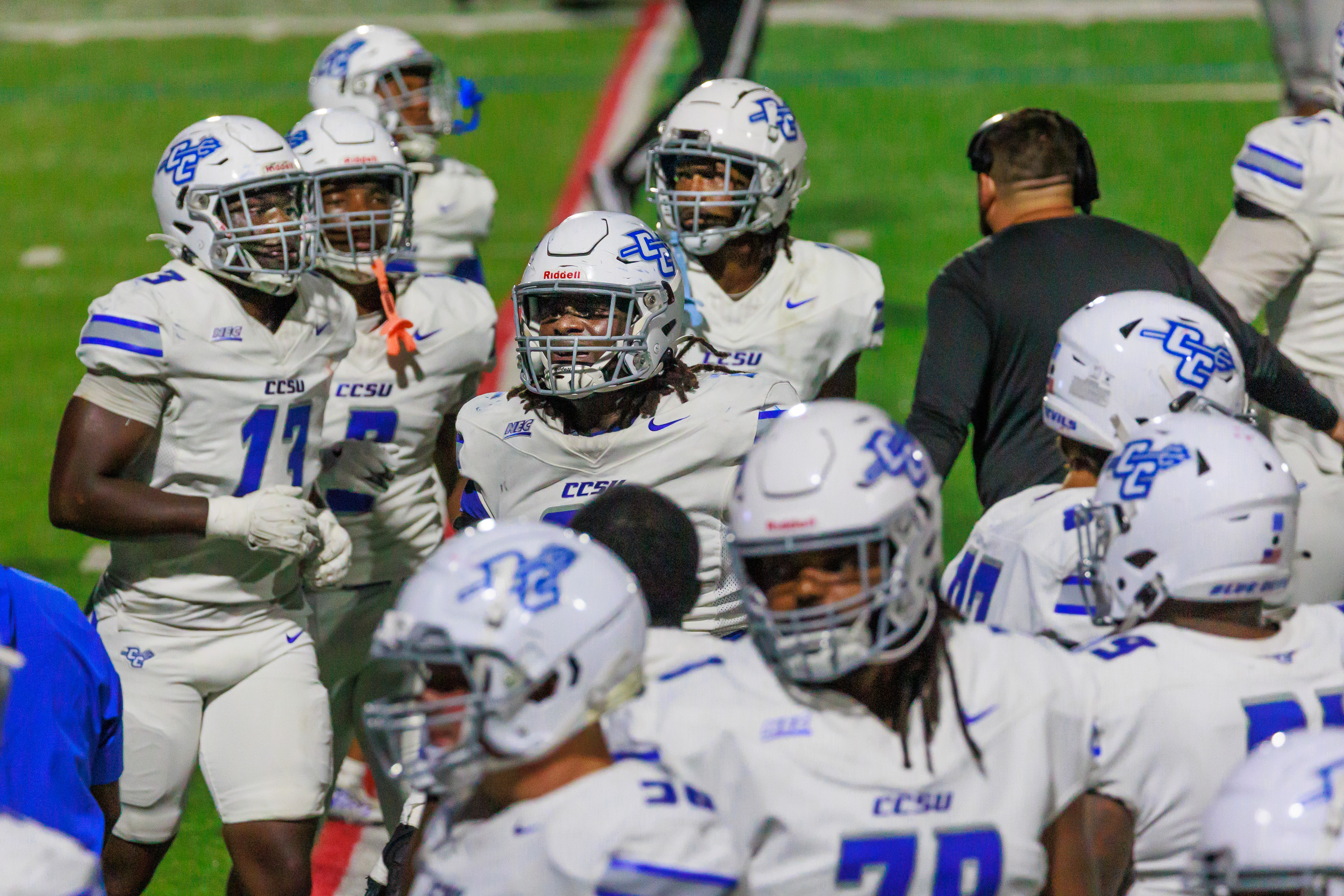
2025 players

The Central Connecticut Blue Devils football program is the intercollegiate football team for Central Connecticut State University located in the U.S. state of Connecticut. The team competes in the NCAA Division I Football Championship Subdivision (FCS) and are members of the Northeast Conference. Central Connecticut State's first football team was fielded in 1935. The team plays its home games at the 5,500 seat Arute Field in New Britain, Connecticut. The Blue Devils are coached by Adam Lechtenberg.

== History ==
=== Classifications ===
- 1959–1962: NAIA
- 1963–1972: NCAA College Division
- 1973–1992: NCAA Division II
- 1993–present: NCAA Division I-AA/FCS

=== Conference memberships ===
- 1935–1941: Independent
- 1942–1945: No team
- 1946–1964: Independent
- 1965–1974: Eastern Football Conference
- 1975–1992: NCAA Division II independent
- 1993–1995: NCAA Division I-AA independent
- 1996–present: Northeast Conference

== Championships ==
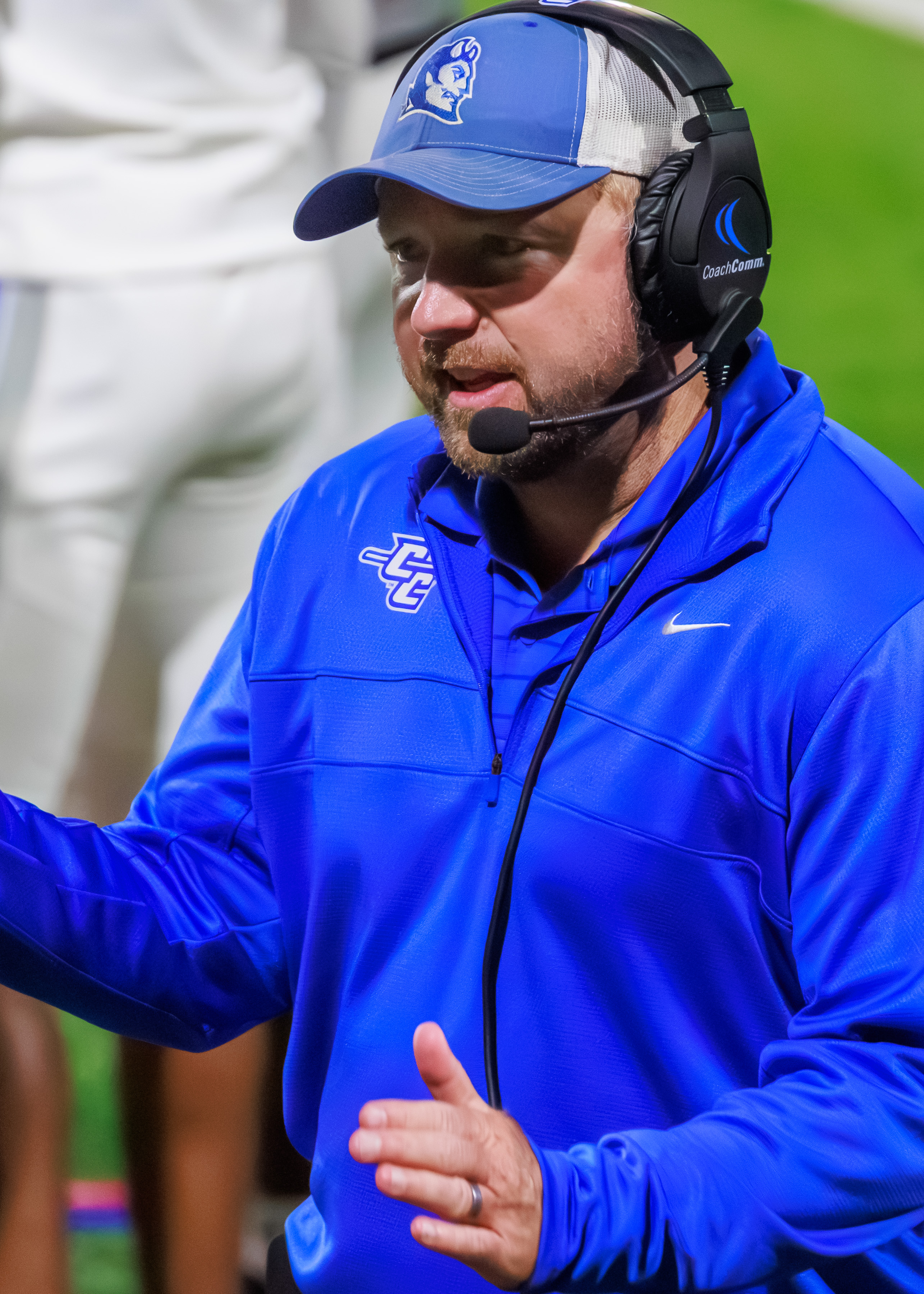
Coach Adam Lechtenberg

=== Conference ===
Season	Coach	Conference	Overall record
1967†	Bill Loika (4)	Eastern Football Conference (4)	7–1
1972†	Bill Loika (4)	Eastern Football Conference (4)	5–5
1973	Bill Loika (4)	Eastern Football Conference (4)	9–1
1974	Bill Loika (4)	Eastern Football Conference (4)	4–5–1
2004†	Tom Masella (2)	Northeast Conference (8)	8–2
2005†	Tom Masella (2)	Northeast Conference (8)	7–4
2009	Jeff McInerney (2)	Northeast Conference (8)	9–3
2010†	Jeff McInerney (2)	Northeast Conference (8)	8–3
2017	Peter Rossomando (1)	Northeast Conference (8)	8–4
2019	Ryan McCarthy (1)	Northeast Conference (8)	10–1
2024†	Adam Lechtenberg (3)	Northeast Conference (8)	7–6
2025	Adam Lechtenberg (3)	Northeast Conference (8)	8–5
2026†	Adam Lechtenberg (3)	Northeast Conference (8)	6–5

- † notes Co-championship

== Postseason ==
=== NCAA Division I-AA/FCS ===
The Blue Devils have made four appearances in the NCAA Division I-AA/FCS playoffs. Their combined record is 0–4.

Year	Round	Opponent	Result
2017	First Round	New Hampshire	L 0–14
2019	First Round	Albany	L 14–42
2024	First Round	Rhode Island	L 17–21
2025	First Round	Rhode Island	L 19–27

== Future non-conference opponents ==
Future non-conference opponents announced as of November 4, 2026.

2027	2028	2029	2030
at Cincinnati	Holy Cross	at James Madison	at Dartmouth
Merrimack	at Marshall		
at Holy Cross	at Fordham		
at Buffalo			
Dartmouth			
