= Tom Masella =

American football player and coach (born 1959)

Current position
- Title: Head coach
- Team: Wagner
- Conference: NEC
- Record: 15–49

Biographical details
- Born: July 11, 1959 (age 67); Staten Island, New York, U.S.

Playing career
- 1978–1981: Wagner
- Position: Defensive back

Coaching career (HC unless noted)
- 1982–1984: Wagner (assistant)
- 1985–1989: Merchant Marine (DC)
- 1990–1992: Boston University (DB)
- 1993: Boston University (DC/DB)
- 1994: Boston University (AHC/DC/DB)
- 1995: Fairfield
- 1996–1997: Boston University
- 1998: Connecticut (AHC/DB)
- 1999–2001: Louisiana Tech (DC)
- 2002–2003: UMass (DC)
- 2004–2005: Central Connecticut
- 2006–2011: Fordham
- 2012–2013: Wagner (AHC/OC)
- 2014–2016: UMass (DC/S)
- 2019: Bryant (DC/LB)
- 2020–present: Wagner

Head coaching record
- Overall: 59–115
- Tournaments: 0–1 (NCAA D-I playoffs)

Accomplishments and honors

Championships
- 2 Northeast (2004–2005); 1 Patriot League (2007)

Tom Masella (born July 11, 1959) is an American college football coach and former player. He is the head football coach at Wagner College, a position he has held since 2020. Massella served as the head football coach at Boston University from 1996 to 1997, Central Connecticut State University from 2004 to 2005, and Fordham University from 2006 to 2007.

After serving as an assistant at Wagner College, the United States Merchant Marine Academy, and Boston University, Masella became the first head coach of the Fairfield University football team. He left prior to their first game to return to Boston University, thus was the only coach at Fairfield who never coached a game. Masella coached BU to a 2–20 over two seasons before the university dropped football.

After BU, Masella was an assistant at the University of Connecticut, Louisiana Tech University, and UMass before becoming the head coach at Central Connecticut State University. Masella left Central Connecticut State to become head coach at Fordham. In 2007, his second season at Fordham, he led the Rams to an 8–4 record, the Patriot League championship, and a spot in the NCAA FCS playoffs.

== Head coaching record ==
Year	Team	Overall	Conference	Standing	Bowl/playoffs
Boston University Terriers (Yankee Conference) (1996)
1996	Boston University	1–10	0–8	6th (New England)	
Boston University Terriers (Atlantic 10 Conference) (1997)
1997	Boston University	1–10	1–7	T–5th (New England)	
Boston University:		2–20	1–15		
Central Connecticut Blue Devils (Northeast Conference) (2004–2005)
2004	Central Connecticut	8–2	6–1	T–1st	
2005	Central Connecticut	7–4	5–2	T–1st	
Central Connecticut:		15–6	11–3		
Fordham Rams (Patriot League) (2006–2011)
2006	Fordham	3–8	1–5	6th	
2007	Fordham	8–4	5–1	1st	L NCAA Division I First Round
2008	Fordham	5–6	1–5	6th	
2009	Fordham	5–6	2–4	T–5th	
2010	Fordham	5–6	N/A	N/A	
2011	Fordham	1–10	N/A	N/A	
Fordham:		27–40	9–15		
Wagner Seahawks (Northeast Conference) (2020–present)
2020–21	Wagner	0–2	0–2	5th	
2021	Wagner	0–11	0–7	8th	
2022	Wagner	1–10	1–6	8th	
2023	Wagner	4–7	3–4	6th	
2024	Wagner	4–8	2–4	T–5th	
2025	Wagner	5–7	4–3	T-3rd	
2026	Wagner	1–4	0–2		
Wagner:		15–49	10–28		
Total:		58–115			
National championship Conference title Conference division title or championship game berth
