= Adam Lechtenberg =

American football coach

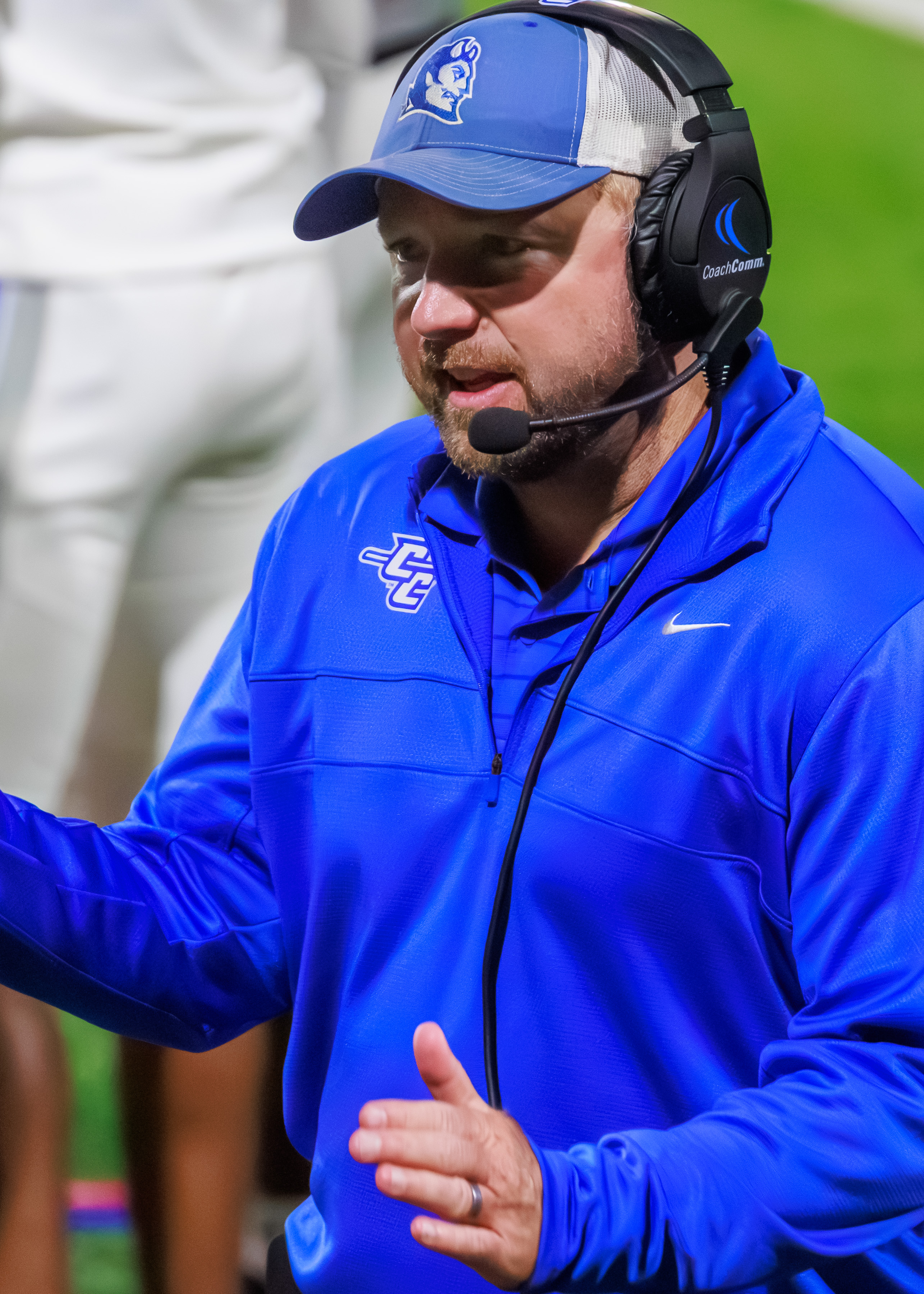
- Lechtenberg in 2025

Current position
- Title: Head coach
- Team: Central Connecticut
- Conference: NEC
- Record: 24–24

Biographical details
- Born: 1979 or 1980 (age 46–47)

Playing career
- 1998–2001: Nebraska
- Positions: Quarterback, defensive back

Coaching career (HC unless noted)
- c. 2003: Fowler HS (KS) (DC)
- 2005–2006: Wayne State (NE) (GA/WR)
- 2007: Truman (VC/RB)
- 2007–2009: TCU (OGA)
- 2010–2011: Central Connecticut (QB/co-OC/RC)
- 2015: Memphis (interim WR)
- 2016: UT Martin (WR/PGC)
- 2018–2019: Virginia Tech (AHC)
- 2020: Virginia Tech (RB)
- 2021: Virginia Tech (RB/ORC)
- 2022: Central Oklahoma (co-OC/QB/AHC)
- 2023–present: Central Connecticut

Administrative career (AD unless noted)
- 2012–2015: Memphis (DPP)
- 2017: Virginia Tech (DPD)
- 2018–2019: Virginia Tech (EDPD)

Head coaching record
- Overall: 24–24
- Tournaments: 0–2 (NCAA D-I Playoffs)

Accomplishments and honors

Championships
- 3 NEC (2024–2026)

Adam Lechtenberg (born 1979/1980) is an American football coach and former player who is currently the head coach for the Central Connecticut Blue Devils of the Northeast Conference (NEC). He played college football at Nebraska and has since coached or served as an administrator with Fowler High School, Wayne State (NE), Truman, TCU, Central Connecticut, Memphis, UT Martin, Virginia Tech and Central Oklahoma.

== Early life and education ==
Lechtenberg grew up in Butte, Nebraska. He attended Butte High School where he played football, basketball and track and field. Lechtenberg played quarterback in football and led his team to an overall record of 35–3 as starter, being a first-team all-state selection. He was named honorable mention all-state in basketball and in track and field was a state medalist. In 1998, he began playing college football at Nebraska, having made the team as a walk-on. Lechtenberg graduated in 2002 with a bachelor of science degree in agribusiness.

== Coaching career ==
Lechtenberg began his coaching career at Fowler High School after graduating from Nebraska, serving as defensive coordinator for at least one season. He worked at a TCU football camp in 2004. In 2005, he began serving as wide receivers coach and graduate assistant for Wayne State (NE).

Lechtenberg became the running backs coach and video coordinator for Truman in 2007, but only served preseason; he became an offensive graduate assistant at TCU during the regular season. He served in that position at TCU through 2009, and received a master's degree from the school. Lechtenberg became the co-offensive coordinator at Central Connecticut in 2010, and served two years in the position, helping the team win the conference championship in his first year. He also coached quarterbacks and served as recruiting coordinator at the school.

After leaving Central Connecticut in 2012, Lechtenberg accepted a position as director of player personnel for Memphis. In this role, he was the liaison between the football team and academics, housing and admissions. He served in the position through 2015, and also was the interim wide receivers coach in his final year. He helped them compile a record of 10–3 in 2014, tied for the best in school history, and win the conference championship, their first since 1971. Lechtenberg additionally oversaw the Memphis walk-on program, which helped 11 players win scholarships and 23 make an impact on the team.

Lechtenberg became the wide receivers coach and passing game coordinator at UT Martin in 2016, and was in that role for one year. He helped them achieve 32.2 points-per-game, which ranked second in the division. In 2017, he was named director of player development at Virginia Tech, and after one season in that position, became the assistant head coach and executive director of player development in 2018. Following the 2019 season, Lechtenberg was promoted to running backs coach, and led the backs to average 5.58 yards-per-carry in 2020, the all-time school record. He added the position of offensive recruiting coordinator in 2021.

In 2022, Lechtenberg became co-offensive coordinator, assistant head coach and quarterbacks coach at Central Oklahoma. After one season there, he was named head coach of Central Connecticut in January 2023.

== Personal life ==
Lechtenberg is married and has a daughter. His brother, Brandon, is the head football coach for Millsaps College, a position he has held since 2024.

== Head coaching record ==
Year	Team	Overall	Conference	Standing	Bowl/playoffs
Central Connecticut Blue Devils (Northeast Conference) (2023–present)
2023	Central Connecticut	3–8	1–6	8th	
2024	Central Connecticut	7–6	5–1	T–1st	L NCAA Division I First Round
2025	Central Connecticut	8–5	6–1	1st	L NCAA Division I First Round
2026	Central Connecticut	6–5	5–2	T–1st	
Central Connecticut:		24–24	12–10		
Total:		24–24			
