= Eastern Football Conference (1965–1974) =

The Eastern Football Conference was an NCAA intercollegiate athletic football conference that existed from 1965 to 1974. The league's membership was centered in the Northeastern United States. A separate NCAA Division II conference with the same name existed from 1997 to 2000.

== Members ==
Team	Location	Joined	Last season	Conference joined
Bridgeport Purple Knights	Bridgeport, Connecticut	1965	1971	NCAA College Division independent
Central Connecticut Blue Devils	New Britain, Connecticut	1965	1974	NCAA Division II independent
Glassboro State Profs	Glassboro, New Jersey	1965	1974	New Jersey State Athletic Conference
Monclair State Indians	Montclair, New Jersey	1965	1974	New Jersey State Athletic Conference
Southern Connecticut State Owls	New Haven, Connecticut	1965	1974	NCAA Division II independent
Trenton State Lions	Trenton, New Jersey	1965	1968	New Jersey State Athletic Conference

== Champions ==
- 1965 – Southern Connecticut State
- 1966 – Southern Connecticut State
- 1967 – Central Connecticut State & Southern Connecticut State
- 1968 – Southern Connecticut State
- 1969 – Bridgeport
- 1970 – Montclair State & Southern Connecticut State
- 1971 – Bridgeport
- 1972 – Central Connecticut State & Glassboro State
- 1973 – Central Connecticut State
- 1974 – Central Connecticut State

== Yearly standings ==
1965 Eastern Football Conference football standings
	Conf.					Overall
Team	W		L		T	W		L		T
Southern Connecticut State $	5	–	0	–	0	7	–	3	–	0
Central Connecticut State	3	–	1	–	0	7	–	1	–	0
Montclair State	3	–	1	–	0	4	–	4	–	0
Bridgeport	1	–	3	–	0	3	–	6	–	0
Trenton State	1	–	4	–	0	1	–	8	–	0
Glassboro State	0	–	4	–	0	0	–	8	–	0
$ – Conference champion

1966 Eastern Football Conference football standings
	Conf.					Overall
Team	W		L		T	W		L		T
Southern Connecticut State $	4	–	1	–	0	6	–	3	–	0
Bridgeport	3	–	1	–	0	7	–	3	–	0
Central Connecticut State	3	–	2	–	0	7	–	2	–	0
Trenton State	3	–	2	–	0	4	–	4	–	0
Montclair State	1	–	4	–	0	3	–	5	–	0
Glassboro State	0	–	4	–	0	1	–	7	–	1
$ – Conference champion

1967 Eastern Football Conference football standings
	Conf.					Overall
Team	W		L		T	W		L		T
Central Connecticut State +	4	–	1	–	0	7	–	1	–	0
Southern Connecticut State +	4	–	1	–	0	6	–	3	–	0
Bridgeport	2	–	2	–	0	2	–	6	–	0
Montclair State	2	–	3	–	0	4	–	5	–	0
Glassboro State	1	–	3	–	0	3	–	5	–	0
Trenton State	1	–	4	–	0	2	–	6	–	0
+ – Conference co-champions

1968 Eastern Football Conference football standings
	Conf.					Overall
Team	W		L		T	W		L		T
Southern Connecticut State $	4	–	0	–	1	4	–	4	–	1
Central Connecticut State	3	–	2	–	0	6	–	2	–	1
Bridgeport	3	–	2	–	0	4	–	5	–	0
Trenton State	2	–	2	–	1	5	–	2	–	1
Glassboro State	1	–	4	–	0	2	–	6	–	0
Montclair State	1	–	4	–	0	2	–	7	–	0
$ – Conference champion

1969 Eastern Football Conference football standings
	Conf.					Overall
Team	W		L		T	W		L		T
Bridgeport $	4	–	0	–	0	8	–	2	–	0
Montclair State	3	–	1	–	0	8	–	2	–	0
Glassboro State	2	–	2	–	0	5	–	3	–	0
Central Connecticut State	1	–	3	–	0	5	–	4	–	0
Southern Connecticut State	0	–	4	–	0	1	–	8	–	0
$ – Conference champion

1970 Eastern Football Conference football standings
	Conf.					Overall
Team	W		L		T	W		L		T
Montclair State +	3	–	1	–	0	9	–	1	–	0
Southern Connecticut State +	3	–	1	–	0	5	–	3	–	1
Central Connecticut State	2	–	1	–	1	5	–	3	–	1
Bridgeport	1	–	3	–	0	4	–	6	–	0
Glassboro State	0	–	3	–	1	3	–	4	–	1
+ – Conference co-champions

1971 Eastern Football Conference football standings
	Conf.					Overall
Team	W		L		T	W		L		T
Bridgeport $	4	–	0	–	0	10	–	1	–	0
Montclair State	3	–	1	–	0	7	–	2	–	0
Southern Connecticut State	2	–	2	–	0	5	–	4	–	0
Central Connecticut State	1	–	3	–	0	7	–	3	–	0
Glassboro State	0	–	4	–	0	2	–	6	–	0
$ – Conference champion

1972 Eastern Football Conference football standings
	Conf.					Overall
Team	W		L		T	W		L		T
Glassboro State +	2	–	1	–	0	7	–	2	–	0
Central Connecticut State +	2	–	1	–	0	5	–	5	–	0
Montclair State	1	–	2	–	0	6	–	4	–	0
Southern Connecticut State	1	–	2	–	0	4	–	6	–	0
+ – Conference co-champions

1973 Eastern Football Conference football standings
	Conf.					Overall
Team	W		L		T	W		L		T
Central Connecticut State $	3	–	0	–	0	9	–	1	–	0
Southern Connecticut State	2	–	1	–	0	6	–	4	–	0
Montclair State	1	–	2	–	0	6	–	4	–	0
Glassboro State	0	–	3	–	0	4	–	6	–	0
$ – Conference champion

1974 Eastern Football Conference football standings
	Conf.					Overall
Team	W		L		T	W		L		T
Central Connecticut State $	3	–	0	–	0	4	–	5	–	1
Glassboro State	2	–	1	–	0	6	–	3	–	1
Montclair State	1	–	2	–	0	6	–	3	–	1
Southern Connecticut State	0	–	3	–	0	4	–	5	–	0
$ – Conference champion

== See also ==
- List of defunct college football conferences
