= Ralph F. DellaCamera Stadium =

American sport stadium

- Interactive map of Ralph F. DellaCamera Stadium
- Location: West Haven, Connecticut
- Coordinates: 41.29583°N 72.9673°W
- Owner: University of New Haven
- Operator: University of New Haven
- Capacity: 5,000
- Surface: Blue & Gold Sprinturf

Construction
- Opened: September 19, 2009

Ralph F. DellaCamera Stadium is a sport stadium in West Haven, Connecticut. The facility is primarily used by the University of New Haven athletic teams, as well as the University of New Haven Chargers Marching Band.

The field turf is not the normal selection of green, but is instead blue. The selection of blue—a non-traditional field color—was made to generate excitement and publicity while the school was re-establishing its college football program. As of the 2012 season, New Haven is only one of five college programs to have the field color other than the traditional green

The first college football game played at the stadium was a 25–18 loss to the Bentley University Falcons on September 26, 2009.

The stadium is also used for local high school sporting events and other community events. The University of New Haven used DellaCamera Stadium for its Spring Commencement until May 2011, where the University moved the ceremony to the Oakdale Theatre.

== See also ==
- List of college football stadiums with non-traditional field colors
