= Bethpage Federal Credit Union Stadium =

Multi-purpose stadium in New York, USA

Bethpage Federal Stadium
- Interactive map of Bethpage Federal Stadium
- Location: Brookville, New York
- Coordinates: 40.816284°N 73.589546°W
- Owner: Long Island University
- Operator: Long Island University
- Capacity: 6,000+
- Surface: Synthetic turf

Construction
- Opened: 1966

Tenants
- LIU Post Pioneers (NCAA) (1966–2018); LIU Sharks (NCAA) (2019–present)

Bethpage Federal Credit Union Stadium is a 6,000-seat multi-purpose stadium in Brookville, New York. It is the home of the LIU Sharks football, lacrosse, and field hockey programs.

The stadium opened in 1966, and it was renovated in 2014 when it gained sponsorship from Bethpage Federal Credit Union.
