= List of Northeast Conference football standings =

This is a list of yearly Northeast Conference football standings.

== Northeast Conference standings ==
1996 Northeast Conference football standings
	Conf.			Overall
Team	W		L	W		L
Robert Morris +	3	–	1	9	–	2
Monmouth +	3	–	1	7	–	3
Central Connecticut State	2	–	2	3	–	7
Wagner	2	–	2	5	–	5
Saint Francis (PA)	0	–	4	3	–	7
+ – Conference co-champions

1997 Northeast Conference football standings
	Conf.			Overall
Team	W		L	W		L
Robert Morris $	4	–	0	8	–	3
Monmouth	3	–	1	5	–	4
Wagner	2	–	2	6	–	4
Central Connecticut State	1	–	3	5	–	5
Saint Francis (PA)	0	–	4	2	–	9
$ – Conference champion

1998 Northeast Conference football standings
	Conf.			Overall
Team	W		L	W		L
Monmouth +	4	–	1	5	–	5
Robert Morris +	4	–	1	4	–	6
Wagner	3	–	2	7	–	3
Central Connecticut State	3	–	2	4	–	6
Sacred Heart	1	–	4	2	–	8
Saint Francis (PA)	0	–	5	0	–	10
+ – Conference co-champions

1999 Northeast Conference football standings
	Conf.			Overall
Team	W		L	W		L
Robert Morris $	7	–	0	8	–	2
Albany	6	–	1	7	–	2
Wagner	5	–	2	5	–	5
Stony Brook	4	–	3	5	–	5
Central Connecticut State	3	–	4	4	–	6
Monmouth	2	–	5	2	–	8
Saint Francis (PA)	1	–	6	2	–	9
Sacred Heart	0	–	7	2	–	9
$ – Conference champion

2000 Northeast Conference football standings
	Conf.			Overall
Team	W		L	W		L
Robert Morris $	8	–	0	10	–	0
Sacred Heart	7	–	1	10	–	1
Wagner	6	–	2	6	–	5
Albany	5	–	3	5	–	6
Monmouth	4	–	4	5	–	6
Central Connecticut State	3	–	5	4	–	6
St. John's	2	–	6	5	–	6
Stony Brook	1	–	7	2	–	8
Saint Francis (PA)	0	–	8	0	–	11
$ – Conference champion

2001 Northeast Conference football standings
	Conf.			Overall
Team	W		L	W		L
Sacred Heart $	8	–	0	11	–	0
Robert Morris	6	–	1	6	–	3
Albany	5	–	2	7	–	3
Monmouth	5	–	2	7	–	3
Stony Brook	3	–	5	3	–	6
Wagner	3	–	5	3	–	6
Central Connecticut State	2	–	5	2	–	7
St. John's	1	–	6	1	–	9
Saint Francis (PA)	0	–	7	0	–	10
$ – Conference champion

2002 Northeast Conference football standings
	Conf.			Overall
Team	W		L	W		L
Albany $	6	–	1	8	–	4
Stony Brook	5	–	2	8	–	2
Sacred Heart	5	–	2	7	–	3
Wagner	4	–	3	7	–	4
Central Connecticut State	3	–	4	5	–	6
Robert Morris	2	–	5	3	–	4
Monmouth	2	–	5	2	–	8
Saint Francis (PA)	1	–	6	2	–	8
$ – Conference champion

2003 Northeast Conference football standings
	Conf.			Overall
Team	W		L	W		L
Monmouth +	6	–	1	10	–	2
Albany +	6	–	1	7	–	4
Robert Morris	4	–	3	6	–	4
Stony Brook	4	–	3	6	–	4
Sacred Heart	3	–	4	6	–	5
Wagner	3	–	4	6	–	5
Central Connecticut State	2	–	4	3	–	8
Saint Francis (PA)	0	–	7	1	–	9
+ – Conference co-champions

2004 Northeast Conference football standings
	Conf.			Overall
Team	W		L	W		L
Monmouth +	6	–	1	10	–	1
Central Connecticut State +	6	–	1	8	–	2
Albany	4	–	3	4	–	7
Sacred Heart	3	–	4	6	–	4
Robert Morris	3	–	4	6	–	5
Wagner	3	–	4	6	–	5
Stony Brook	2	–	5	3	–	7
Saint Francis (PA)	1	–	6	3	–	8
+ – Conference co-champions

2005 Northeast Conference football standings
	Conf.			Overall
Team	W		L	W		L
Central Connecticut State +	5	–	2	7	–	4
Stony Brook +	5	–	2	6	–	5
Monmouth	4	–	3	6	–	4
Albany	4	–	3	5	–	6
Wagner	3	–	4	6	–	5
Sacred Heart	3	–	4	4	–	6
Saint Francis (PA)	3	–	4	3	–	8
Robert Morris	1	–	6	2	–	8
+ – Conference co-champions

2006 Northeast Conference football standings
	Conf.			Overall
Team	W		L	W		L
Monmouth $	6	–	1	10	–	2
Albany	5	–	2	7	–	4
Robert Morris	5	–	2	7	–	4
Stony Brook	5	–	2	5	–	6
Central Connecticut State	4	–	3	8	–	3
Saint Francis (PA)	2	–	5	3	–	8
Sacred Heart	1	–	6	2	–	9
Wagner	0	–	7	4	–	7
$ – Conference champion

2007 Northeast Conference football standings
	Conf.			Overall
Team	W		L	W		L
Albany $	6	–	0	8	–	4
Central Connecticut State	4	–	2	6	–	5
Wagner	3	–	3	7	–	4
Monmouth	3	–	3	4	–	6
Robert Morris	3	–	3	4	–	6
Saint Francis (PA)	2	–	4	3	–	7
Sacred Heart	0	–	6	3	–	8
$ – Conference champion

2008 Northeast Conference football standings
	Conf.			Overall
Team	W		L	W		L
Albany $	7	–	0	9	–	3
Monmouth	6	–	1	7	–	5
Sacred Heart	4	–	3	8	–	3
Central Connecticut State	4	–	3	7	–	4
Robert Morris	4	–	3	5	–	6
Duquesne	2	–	5	3	–	7
Wagner	1	–	6	3	–	8
Saint Francis (PA)	0	–	7	0	–	11
$ – Conference champion

2009 Northeast Conference football standings
	Conf.			Overall
Team	W		L	W		L
Central Connecticut State $	7	–	1	9	–	3
Albany	6	–	2	7	–	4
Wagner	5	–	3	6	–	5
Robert Morris	5	–	3	5	–	6
Monmouth	4	–	4	5	–	6
Bryant	4	–	4	5	–	6
Duquesne	2	–	6	3	–	8
Sacred Heart	2	–	6	2	–	8
Saint Francis (PA)	1	–	7	2	–	9
$ – Conference champion

2010 Northeast Conference football standings
	Conf.			Overall
Team	W		L	W		L
Robert Morris +^	7	–	1	8	–	3
Central Connecticut State +	7	–	1	8	–	3
Duquesne	5	–	3	7	–	4
Bryant	4	–	4	7	–	4
Albany	4	–	4	6	–	5
Wagner	3	–	5	5	–	6
Monmouth	3	–	5	3	–	8
Sacred Heart	2	–	6	4	–	7
Saint Francis (PA)	1	–	7	1	–	10
+ – Conference co-champions; ^ – FCS playoff participant

2011 Northeast Conference football standings
	Conf.			Overall
Team	W		L	W		L
Duquesne +	7	–	1	9	–	2
Albany +^	7	–	1	8	–	4
Bryant	5	–	3	7	–	4
Monmouth	4	–	4	5	–	6
Wagner	4	–	4	4	–	7
Sacred Heart	3	–	5	5	–	6
Central Connecticut	3	–	5	4	–	7
Robert Morris	2	–	6	2	–	9
Saint Francis (PA)	1	–	7	2	–	9
+ – Conference co-champions; ^ – FCS playoff participant

2012 Northeast Conference football standings
	Conf.			Overall
Team	W		L	W		L
No. 21 Wagner +^	7	–	1	9	–	4
Albany +	7	–	1	9	–	2
Monmouth	4	–	3	5	–	5
Saint Francis (PA)	4	–	4	5	–	6
Bryant	4	–	4	4	–	7
Robert Morris	3	–	5	4	–	7
Duquesne	3	–	5	5	–	6
Central Connecticut	2	–	5	2	–	8
Sacred Heart	1	–	7	2	–	9
+ – Conference co-champions; ^ – FCS playoff participant; Rankings from The Sports Network poll

2013 Northeast Conference football standings
	Conf.			Overall
Team	W		L	W		L
Sacred Heart +^	4	–	2	10	–	3
Duquesne +	4	–	2	7	–	4
Robert Morris	3	–	3	5	–	6
Saint Francis (PA)	3	–	3	5	–	6
Bryant	3	–	3	5	–	7
Central Connecticut	2	–	4	4	–	8
Wagner	2	–	4	3	–	8
+ – Conference co-champions; ^ – FCS playoff participant

2014 Northeast Conference football standings
	Conf.			Overall
Team	W		L	W		L
Sacred Heart +^	5	–	1	9	–	3
Wagner +	5	–	1	7	–	4
Bryant	4	–	2	8	–	3
Saint Francis (PA) *	3	–	3	5	–	6
Duquesne	2	–	4	6	–	6
Central Connecticut	1	–	5	3	–	9
Robert Morris	1	–	5	1	–	10
+ – Conference co-champions; ^ – FCS playoff participant; * – Saint Francis (PA) ineligible for FCS playoffs due to APR violation

2015 Northeast Conference football standings
	Conf.			Overall
Team	W		L	W		L
Duquesne $^	5	–	1	8	–	4
Saint Francis (PA)	4	–	2	6	–	4
Sacred Heart	3	–	3	6	–	5
Bryant	3	–	3	5	–	6
Central Connecticut	3	–	3	4	–	7
Robert Morris	2	–	4	4	–	7
Wagner	1	–	5	1	–	10
$ – Conference champion; ^ – FCS playoff participant

2016 Northeast Conference football standings
	Conf.			Overall
Team	W		L	W		L
Duquesne +	5	–	1	8	–	3
Saint Francis (PA) +^	5	–	1	7	–	5
Wagner	4	–	2	6	–	5
Bryant	4	–	2	5	–	6
Sacred Heart	1	–	5	6	–	5
Central Connecticut	1	–	5	2	–	9
Robert Morris	1	–	5	2	–	9
+ – Conference co-champions; ^ – FCS playoff participant

2017 Northeast Conference football standings
	Conf.			Overall
Team	W		L	W		L
Central Connecticut $^	6	–	0	8	–	3
Duquesne	4	–	2	7	–	4
Bryant	4	–	2	6	–	5
Saint Francis (PA)	3	–	3	5	–	6
Sacred Heart	2	–	4	4	–	7
Wagner	2	–	4	4	–	7
Robert Morris	0	–	6	2	–	9
$ – Conference champion; ^ – FCS playoff participant

2018 Northeast Conference football standings
	Conf.			Overall
Team	W		L	W		L
No. 21 Duquesne +^	5	–	1	8	–	3
Sacred Heart +	5	–	1	7	–	4
Central Connecticut	4	–	2	6	–	5
Wagner	3	–	3	4	–	7
Saint Francis (PA)	2	–	4	4	–	7
Bryant	2	–	4	6	–	5
Robert Morris	0	–	6	2	–	9
+ – Conference co-champions; ^ – FCS playoff participant; Rankings from STATS Poll

2019 Northeast Conference football standings
	Conf.			Overall
Team	W		L	W		L
No. 23 Central Connecticut $^	7	–	0	11	–	1
Robert Morris	6	–	1	7	–	5
Duquesne	4	–	3	6	–	5
Sacred Heart	4	–	3	7	–	5
Saint Francis (PA)	3	–	4	6	–	6
Bryant	3	–	4	4	–	8
Wagner	1	–	6	1	–	11
LIU	0	–	7	0	–	10
Merrimack *	0	–	0	6	–	5
$ – Conference champion; ^ – FCS playoff participant; * – Merrimack ineligible for NEC title and FCS postseason play due to transition to NCAA Division I, and also ineligible for NEC title due to not playing a full conference schedule; Rankings from STATS Poll

2020 Northeast Conference football standings
	Conf.			Overall
Team	W		L	W		L
Duquesne y	4	–	0	4	–	1
Sacred Heart y$^	2	–	1	3	–	2
LIU	2	–	2	2	–	2
Bryant	2	–	2	2	–	2
Wagner	0	–	2	0	–	2
Merrimack*	0	–	3	0	–	3
Championship: Sacred Heart 34, Duquesne 27 (OT)
$ – Conference champion; y – Championship game participant; ^ – FCS playoff participant; Note: Due to COVID-19, the Northeast suspended the 2020 football season. * – Merrimack ineligible for NEC title and FCS postseason play due to transition to NCAA Division I Central Connecticut and Saint Francis (PA) opted out of the spring season.; Rankings from STATS Poll

2021 Northeast Conference football standings
	Conf.			Overall
Team	W		L	W		L
Sacred Heart $^	6	–	1	8	–	4
Duquesne	5	–	2	7	–	3
Bryant	5	–	2	7	–	4
Central Connecticut	4	–	3	4	–	7
Saint Francis (PA)	4	–	3	5	–	6
Merrimack *	2	–	5	5	–	6
LIU	2	–	5	2	–	8
Wagner	0	–	7	0	–	11
$ – Conference champion; ^ – FCS playoff participant; Note: Merrimack ineligible for NEC title and FCS postseason play due to transition from NCAA Division II

2022 Northeast Conference football standings
	Conf.			Overall
Team	W		L	W		L
Saint Francis (PA) $^	7	–	0	9	–	3
Merrimack *	6	–	1	8	–	3
LIU	4	–	3	4	–	7
Duquesne	3	–	4	4	–	7
Sacred Heart	3	–	4	5	–	6
Central Connecticut	2	–	5	2	–	9
Stonehill *	2	–	5	4	–	5
Wagner	1	–	6	1	–	10
$ – Conference champion; ^ – FCS playoff participant; Note: Merrimack and Stonehill ineligible for NEC title and FCS postseason play due to transition from NCAA Division II; Rankings from STATS Poll

2023 Northeast Conference football standings
	Conf.			Overall
Team	W		L	W		L
Duquesne $^	6	–	1	7	–	5
Saint Francis (PA)	4	–	3	4	–	6
Merrimack	4	–	3	5	–	6
Stonehill *	4	–	3	5	–	5
LIU	4	–	3	4	–	7
Wagner	3	–	4	4	–	7
Sacred Heart	2	–	5	2	–	9
Central Connecticut	1	–	6	3	–	8
$ – Conference champion; ^ – FCS playoff participant; Note: Stonehill ineligible for NEC title and FCS postseason play due to transition from NCAA Division II; Rankings from STATS Poll

2024 Northeast Conference football standings
	Conf.			Overall
Team	W		L	W		L
Central Connecticut +^	5	–	1	7	–	6
Duquesne +	5	–	1	8	–	3
Robert Morris	4	–	2	7	–	5
LIU	3	–	3	4	–	8
Wagner	2	–	4	4	–	8
Saint Francis (PA)	2	–	4	4	–	7
Mercyhurst*	0	–	0	4	–	7
Stonehill*	0	–	6	1	–	10
+ – Conference co-champions; ^ – FCS playoff participant; * – Stonehill and Mercyhurst are ineligible for NEC title and FCS postseason play due to transition from NCAA Division II.; Rankings from STATS Poll

2025 Northeast Conference football standings
	Conf.			Overall
Team	W		L	W		L
Central Connecticut $^	6	–	1	8	–	5
Duquesne	5	–	2	7	–	5
Mercyhurst*	4	–	3	5	–	7
LIU	4	–	3	6	–	6
Wagner	4	–	3	5	–	7
Stonehill	3	–	4	4	–	8
Robert Morris	2	–	5	3	–	9
New Haven*	0	–	0	5	–	5
Saint Francis	0	–	7	0	–	11
$ – Conference champion; ^ – FCS playoff participant; * – Ineligible for NEC title and FCS postseason play due to transition from NCAA Division II.; Rankings from STATS Poll

2026 Northeast Conference football standings
	Conf.			Overall
Team	W		L	W		L
Central Connecticut	0	–	0	0	–	0
Duquesne	0	–	0	0	–	0
LIU	0	–	0	0	–	0
Mercyhurst	0	–	0	0	–	0
New Haven	0	–	0	0	–	0
Robert Morris	0	–	0	0	–	0
Stonehill	0	–	0	0	–	0
Wagner	0	–	0	0	–	0
Rankings from STATS Poll
