= 2009 Robert Morris Colonials football team =

American college football season

2009 Robert Morris Colonials football
- Conference: Northeast Conference
- Record: 5–6 (5–3 NEC)
- Head coach: Joe Walton (16th season)
- Defensive coordinator: Scott Farison (2nd season)
- Co-defensive coordinator: Scott Benzel (1st season)
- Home stadium: Joe Walton Stadium

2009 Northeast Conference football standings
| | Conf. | | | Overall |
| Team | W | | L | W | | L |
|---|---|---|---|---|---|---|
| Central Connecticut State $ | 7 | – | 1 | 9 | – | 3 |
| Albany | 6 | – | 2 | 7 | – | 4 |
| Wagner | 5 | – | 3 | 6 | – | 5 |
| Robert Morris | 5 | – | 3 | 5 | – | 6 |
| Monmouth | 4 | – | 4 | 5 | – | 6 |
| Bryant | 4 | – | 4 | 5 | – | 6 |
| Duquesne | 2 | – | 6 | 3 | – | 8 |
| Sacred Heart | 2 | – | 6 | 2 | – | 8 |
| Saint Francis (PA) | 1 | – | 7 | 2 | – | 9 |
$ – Conference champion

The 2009 Robert Morris Colonials football team represented Robert Morris University in the 2009 NCAA Division I FCS football season. The Colonials were led by 16th-year head coach Joe Walton and played their home games at Joe Walton Stadium. They were a member of the Northeast Conference.

== Schedule ==
| Date | Opponent | Site | Result | Attendance |
|---|---|---|---|---|
| September 5 | at VMI* | Alumni Memorial Field; Lexington, VA | L 13–14 | 6,084 |
| September 12 | at Bucknell* | Christy Mathewson–Memorial Stadium; Lewisburg, PA | L 23–26 | 4,172 |
| September 19 | Dayton* | Joe Walton Stadium; Moon Township, PA | L 14–21 | 2,455 |
| September 26 | Bryant | Joe Walton Stadium; Moon Township, PA | L 13–20 | 1,442 |
| October 3 | at Duquesne | Rooney Field; Pittsburgh, PA | L 20–34 | 2,577 |
| October 10 | at Central Connecticut State | Arute Field; New Britain, CT | L 21–42 | 2,654 |
| October 17 | Saint Francis | Joe Walton Stadium; Moon Township, PA | W 28–0 | 1,647 |
| October 31 | Sacred Heart | Joe Walton Stadium; Moon Township, PA | W 9–7 | 1,024 |
| November 7 | at Albany | University Field; Albany, NY | W 13–10 | 2,518 |
| November 14 | Wagner | Joe Walton Stadium; Moon Township, PA | W 37–10 | 1,279 |
| November 21 | at Monmouth | Kessler Field; West Long Branch, NJ | W 23–9 | 1,291 |
*Non-conference game
