= 2003 Monmouth Hawks football team =

American college football season

2003 Monmouth Hawks football

NEC co-champion

ECAC Bowl, L 10–12 vs. Duquesne
- Conference: Northeast Conference
- Record: 10–2 (6–1 NEC)
- Head coach: Kevin Callahan (11th season)
- Offensive coordinator: Mark Fabish (2nd season)
- Offensive scheme: Pro-style
- Defensive coordinator: Andy Bobik (10th season)
- Base defense: 4–3
- Home stadium: Kessler Field

2003 Northeast Conference football standings
	Conf.			Overall
Team	W		L	W		L
Monmouth +	6	–	1	10	–	2
Albany +	6	–	1	7	–	4
Robert Morris	4	–	3	6	–	4
Stony Brook	4	–	3	6	–	4
Sacred Heart	3	–	4	6	–	5
Wagner	3	–	4	6	–	5
Central Connecticut State	2	–	4	3	–	8
Saint Francis (PA)	0	–	7	1	–	9
+ – Conference co-champions

The 2003 Monmouth Hawks football team represented Monmouth University in the 2003 NCAA Division I-AA football season as a member of the Northeast Conference (NEC). The Hawks were led by 11th-year head coach Kevin Callahan and played their home games at Kessler Field. They finished the season 10–2 overall and 6–1 in NEC play to share the conference championship with Albany. Despite having just one regular season loss, the Hawks did not receive an invitation to participate in the NCAA Division I-AA postseason.

== Schedule ==
Date	Time	Opponent	Site	Result	Attendance	Source
September 6	1:00 p.m.	Saint Peter's*	Kessler Field; West Long Branch, NJ	W 24–0	2,917	
September 13	1:00 p.m.	Robert Morris	Kessler Field; West Long Branch, NJ	W 17–10	2,106	
September 20	1:00 p.m.	at Georgetown*	Harbin Field; Washington, DC	W 12–10	1,146	
September 27	6:00 p.m.	at Stony Brook	Kenneth P. LaValle Stadium; Stony Brook, NY	W 20–14	4,834	
October 4	1:00 p.m.	Iona*	Kessler Field; West Long Branch, NJ	W 30–7	2,485	
October 11	1:00 p.m.	Wagner	Kessler Field; West Long Branch, NJ	W 24–0	3,536	
October 18	1:00 p.m.	Albany	Kessler Field; West Long Branch, NJ	W 10–7	4,883	
October 25	1:00 p.m.	at La Salle*	McCarthy Stadium; Philadelphia, PA	W 50–0	2,241	
November 1	1:00 p.m.	at Central Connecticut State	Arute Field; New Britain, CT	L 10–14	1,678	
November 8	12:30 p.m.	at Sacred Heart	Campus Field; Fairfield, CT	W 12–7	1,829	
November 15	1:00 p.m.	at Saint Francis (PA)	Pine Bowl; Loretto, PA	W 28–21	764	
November 22	1:00 p.m.	at Duquesne	Rooney Field; Pittsburgh, PA (ECAC Bowl)	L 10–12	2,012	
*Non-conference game; All times are in Eastern time
