= 2009 Wagner Seahawks football team =

American college football season

2009 Wagner Seahawks football
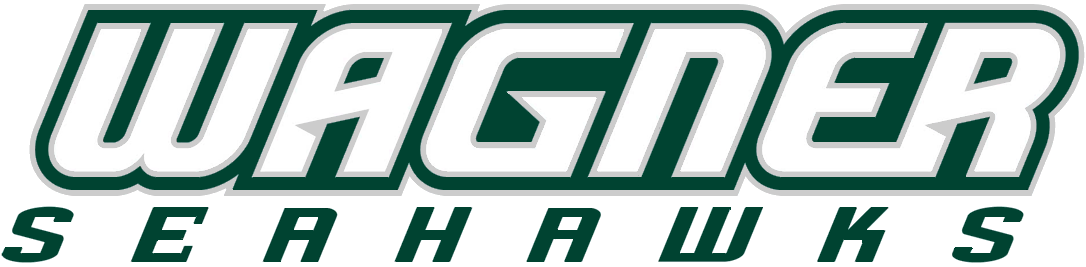
- Conference: Northeast Conference
- Record: 6–5 (5–3 NEC)
- Head coach: Walt Hameline (29th season)
- Home stadium: Wagner College Stadium

2009 Northeast Conference football standings
	Conf.			Overall
Team	W		L	W		L
Central Connecticut State $	7	–	1	9	–	3
Albany	6	–	2	7	–	4
Wagner	5	–	3	6	–	5
Robert Morris	5	–	3	5	–	6
Monmouth	4	–	4	5	–	6
Bryant	4	–	4	5	–	6
Duquesne	2	–	6	3	–	8
Sacred Heart	2	–	6	2	–	8
Saint Francis (PA)	1	–	7	2	–	9
$ – Conference champion

The 2009 Wagner Seahawks football team represented Wagner College in the 2009 NCAA Division I FCS football season as a member of the Northeast Conference (NEC). The Seahawks were led by 29th-year head coach Walt Hameline and played their home games at Wagner College Stadium. They finished the season 6–5 overall and 5–3 in NEC play to tie for third place.

== Schedule ==
Date	Time	Opponent	Site	Result	Attendance	Source
September 5	1:00 p.m.	Stonehill*	Wagner College Stadium; Staten Island, NY	L 42–45	2,076	
September 10	7:00 p.m.	at Maritime*	Reinhart Field; Bronx, NY	W 41–10	2,000	
September 19	6:00 p.m.	at North Dakota State*	Fargodome; Fargo, ND	L 28–59	18,128	
September 26	1:00 p.m.	Saint Francis (PA)	Wagner College Stadium; Staten Island, NY	W 56–48 ^{3OT}	1,867	
October 3	1:00 p.m.	at Bryant	Bulldog Stadium; Smithfield, RI	L 2–6	3,262	
October 10	1:00 p.m.	at Monmouth	Kessler Field; West Long Branch, NJ	W 27–24	1,411	
October 24	1:00 p.m.	Sacred Heart	Wagner College Stadium; Staten Island, NY	W 49–28	2,410	
October 31	Noon	at Duquesne	Rooney Field; Pittsburgh, PA	W 23–17 ^{2OT}	527	
November 7	1:00 p.m.	Central Connecticut State	Wagner College Stadium; Staten Island, NY	W 32–27	1,910	
November 14	Noon	at Robert Morris	Joe Walton Stadium; Moon Township, PA	L 10–37	1,279	
November 21	1:00 p.m.	Albany	Wagner College Stadium; Staten Island, NY	L 28–41	3,335	
*Non-conference game; All times are in Eastern time
