= 2009 Sacred Heart Pioneers football team =

American college football season

2009 Sacred Heart Pioneers football
- Conference: Northeast Conference
- Record: 2–8 (2–6 NEC)
- Head coach: Paul Gorham (6th season)
- Home stadium: Campus Field

2009 Northeast Conference football standings
	Conf.			Overall
Team	W		L	W		L
Central Connecticut State $	7	–	1	9	–	3
Albany	6	–	2	7	–	4
Wagner	5	–	3	6	–	5
Robert Morris	5	–	3	5	–	6
Monmouth	4	–	4	5	–	6
Bryant	4	–	4	5	–	6
Duquesne	2	–	6	3	–	8
Sacred Heart	2	–	6	2	–	8
Saint Francis (PA)	1	–	7	2	–	9
$ – Conference champion

The 2009 Sacred Heart Pioneers football team represented Sacred Heart University as a member of the Northeast Conference (NEC) during the 2009 NCAA Division I FCS football season. Led by sixth-year head coach Paul Gorham, the Pioneers compiled an overall record of 2–8 with a mark of 2–6 in conference play, tying for seventh place in the NEC. Sacred Heart played home games at Campus Field in Fairfield, Connecticut.

== Schedule ==
Date	Time	Opponent	Site	Result	Attendance	Source
September 5	6:00 p.m.	Marist*	Campus Field; Fairfield, CT	L 12–31	2,407	
September 12	1:00 p.m.	at No. 25 Holy Cross*	Fitton Field; Worcester, MA	L 21–52	2,897	
September 26	4:00 p.m.	at Albany	University Field; Albany, NY	L 9–22	3,188	
October 3	11:00 a.m.	at Central Connecticut State	Arute Field; New Britain, CT	L 12–24	3,176	
October 10	1:00 p.m.	Saint Francis (PA)	Campus Field; Fairfield, CT	W 29–7	1,127	
October 17	1:00 p.m.	Monmouth	Campus Field; Fairfield, CT	L 20–42	2,804	
October 24	1:00 p.m.	at Wagner	Wagner College Stadium; Staten Island, NY	L 28–49	2,410	
October 31	12:00 p.m.	at Robert Morris	Joe Walton Stadium; Moon Township, PA	L 7–9	1,024	
November 7	1:00 p.m.	Bryant^{†}	Campus Field; Fairfield, CT	W 24–14	1,847	
November 14	12:00 p.m.	Duquesne	Campus Field; Fairfield, CT	L 42–45	1,009	
*Non-conference game; ^{†}Homecoming; Rankings from The Sports Network Poll released prior to the game; All times are in Eastern time

== Coaching staff ==
Name	Position	Consecutive season at Sacred Heart in current position
Paul Gorham	Head coach	6th
Mark Nofri	Associate head coach/linebackers coach/special teams coordinator	16th
Arthur Asselta	Quarterbacks/wide receivers coach/Recruiting coordinator	6th
Kevin Bolis	Offensive line coach	3rd
Josh Reardon	Defensive backs coach	2nd
Darin Edwards	Defensive line coach	2nd
Matt Gardner	Outside linebackers coach	2nd
Dave Wissman	Defensive backs coach	1st
Ryan Arroyo	Offensive assistant	1st
