= 2009 Bryant Bulldogs football team =

American college football season

2009 Bryant Bulldogs football
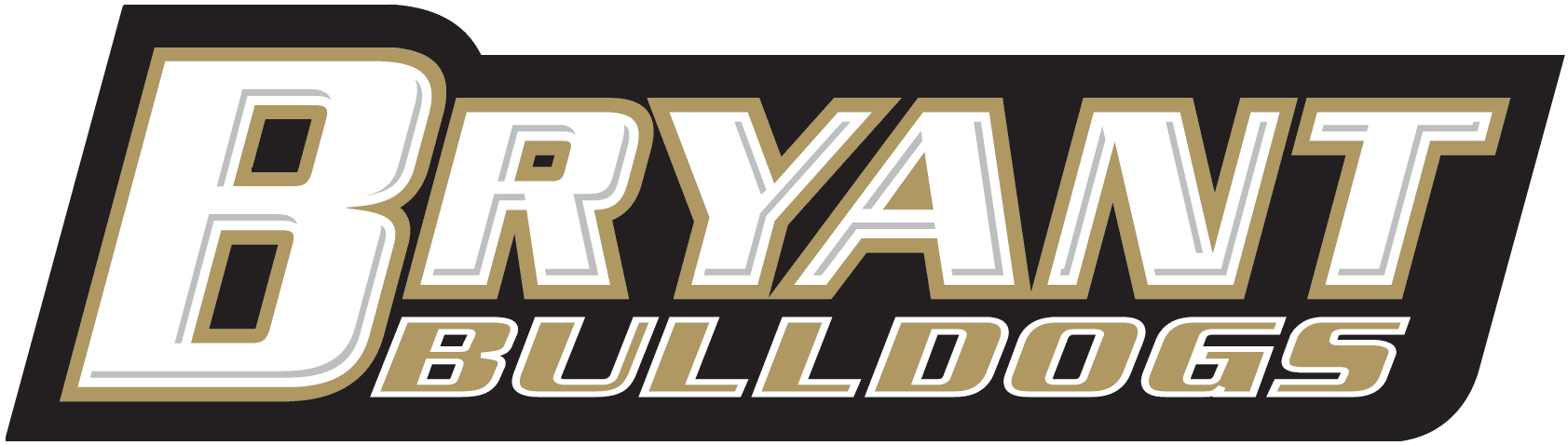
- Conference: Northeast Conference
- Record: 5–6 (4–4 NEC)
- Head coach: Marty Fine (6th season)
- Offensive scheme: Multiple
- Defensive coordinator: Greg Gigantino (3rd season)
- Base defense: 4–3
- Home stadium: Bulldog Stadium

2009 Northeast Conference football standings
	Conf.			Overall
Team	W		L	W		L
Central Connecticut State $	7	–	1	9	–	3
Albany	6	–	2	7	–	4
Wagner	5	–	3	6	–	5
Robert Morris	5	–	3	5	–	6
Monmouth	4	–	4	5	–	6
Bryant	4	–	4	5	–	6
Duquesne	2	–	6	3	–	8
Sacred Heart	2	–	6	2	–	8
Saint Francis (PA)	1	–	7	2	–	9
$ – Conference champion

The 2009 Bryant Bulldogs football team represented Bryant University as a member of the Northeast Conference (NEC) during the 2009 NCAA Division I FCS football season. Led by sixth-year head coach Marty Fine, the Bulldogs compiled an overall record of 5–6 with a mark of 4–4 in conference play, tying for fifth place in the NEC. Bryant played home games at Bulldog Stadium in Smithfield, Rhode Island.

== Schedule ==
Date	Time	Opponent	Site	Result	Attendance	Source
September 5	3:00 pm	Southern Connecticut State*	Bulldog Stadium; Smithfield, RI	W 19–10	3,720	
September 12	1:00 pm	Hofstra*	Bulldog Stadium; Smithfield, RI	L 24–40	1,760	
September 26	12:00 pm	at Robert Morris	Joe Walton Stadium; Moon Township, PA	W 20-13	1,442	
October 3	1:00 pm	Wagner^{†}	Bulldog Stadium; Smithfield, RI	W 6-2	3,262	
October 10	6:00 pm	at Fordham*	Coffey Field; Bronx, NY	L 7-35	2,557	
October 17	1:00 pm	at Albany	University Field; Albany, NY	L 17–20	2,824	
October 24	1:00 pm	Central Connecticut State	Bulldog Stadium; Smithfield, RI	L 23–24	2,566	
October 31	1:00 pm	at Monmouth	Kessler Field; West Long Branch, NJ	L 6–10	2,976	
November 7	1:00 pm	at Sacred Heart	Campus Field; Fairfield, CT	L 14–24	1,847	
November 14	12:00 pm	St. Francis (PA)	Bulldog Stadium; Smithfield, RI	W 35–12	727	
November 21	12:00 pm	at Duquesne	Arthur J. Rooney Athletic Field; Pittsburgh, PA	W 20–0	825	
*Non-conference game; ^{†}Homecoming; All times are in Eastern time
