= 2009 Saint Francis Red Flash football team =

American college football season

2009 Saint Francis Red Flash football
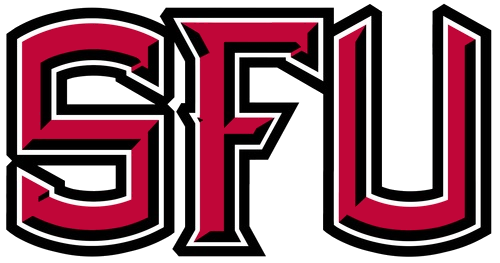
- Conference: Northeast Conference
- Record: 2–9 (1–7 NEC)
- Head coach: Dave Opfar (8th season)
- Home stadium: DeGol Field

2009 Northeast Conference football standings
	Conf.			Overall
Team	W		L	W		L
Central Connecticut State $	7	–	1	9	–	3
Albany	6	–	2	7	–	4
Wagner	5	–	3	6	–	5
Robert Morris	5	–	3	5	–	6
Monmouth	4	–	4	5	–	6
Bryant	4	–	4	5	–	6
Duquesne	2	–	6	3	–	8
Sacred Heart	2	–	6	2	–	8
Saint Francis (PA)	1	–	7	2	–	9
$ – Conference champion

The 2009 Saint Francis Red Flash football team represented Saint Francis University as a member of the Northeast Conference (NEC) during the 2009 NCAA Division I FCS football season. The Red Flash were led by eighth-year head coach Dave Opfar and played their home games at DeGol Field. They finished the season 2–9 overall and 1–7 in NEC play to place last.

After the season, on November 30, Opfar resigned following eight seasons as the team's head coach.

== Schedule ==
Date	Time	Opponent	Site	Result	Attendance
September 5	12:00 p.m.	at No. 8 New Hampshire*	Cowell Stadium; Durham, NH	L 14–24	6,330
September 12	1:00 p.m.	Morehead State*	DeGol Field; Loretto, PA	W 31–0	
September 19	5:05 p.m.	at No. 3 Northern Iowa*	UNI-Dome; Cedar Falls, IA	L 0–30	10,981
September 26	1:00 p.m.	at Wagner	Wagner College Stadium; Staten Island, NY	L 48–56 ^{3OT}	1,867
October 3	1:00 p.m.	at Albany	DeGol Field; Loretto, PA	L 6–27	1,591
October 10	1:00 p.m.	at Sacred Heart	Campus Field; Fairfield, CT	L 7–29	1,127
October 17	12:00 p.m.	at Robert Morris	Joe Walton Stadium; Moon Township, PA	L 0–28	1,647
October 24	7:00 p.m.	Duquesne	DeGol Field; Loretto, PA	W 31–14	1,231
November 7	1:00 p.m.	Monmouth	DeGol Field; Loretto, PA	L 10–24	1,781
November 14	1:00 p.m.	at Bryant	Bulldog Stadium; Smithfield, RI	L 12–35	727
November 21	12:00 p.m.	Central Connecticut State	DeGol Field; Loretto, PA	L 13–14	
*Non-conference game; Rankings from The Sports Network poll released prior to the game; All times are in Eastern time
