= 2000 Stony Brook Seawolves football team =

American college football season

2000 Stony Brook Seawolves football
- Conference: Northeast Conference
- Record: 2–8 (1–7 NEC)
- Head coach: Sam Kornhauser (17th season)
- Home stadium: Seawolves Field

2000 Northeast Conference football standings
| | Conf. | | | Overall |
| Team | W | | L | W | | L |
|---|---|---|---|---|---|---|
| Robert Morris $ | 8 | – | 0 | 10 | – | 0 |
| Sacred Heart | 7 | – | 1 | 10 | – | 1 |
| Wagner | 6 | – | 2 | 6 | – | 5 |
| Albany | 5 | – | 3 | 5 | – | 6 |
| Monmouth | 4 | – | 4 | 5 | – | 6 |
| Central Connecticut State | 3 | – | 5 | 4 | – | 6 |
| St. John's | 2 | – | 6 | 5 | – | 6 |
| Stony Brook | 1 | – | 7 | 2 | – | 8 |
| Saint Francis (PA) | 0 | – | 8 | 0 | – | 11 |
$ – Conference champion

The 2000 Stony Brook Seawolves football team represented Stony Brook University as a member of the Northeast Conference (NEC) during the 2000 NCAA Division I-AA football season. Led by 17th-year head coach Sam Kornhauser, the Seawolves compiled an overall record of 2–8 with a mark of 1–7 in conference place, placing eighth in the NEC. Stony Brook played home games at Seawolves Field in Stony Brook, New York.

== Schedule ==
| Date | Time | Opponent | Site | Result | Attendance |
|---|---|---|---|---|---|
| September 9 | 12:30 p.m. | Southern Connecticut State* | Seawolves Field; Stony Brook, NY | W 26–0 | |
| September 16 | 12:30 p.m. | St. John's | Seawolves Field; Stony Brook, NY | L 6–28 | |
| September 23 | 1:00 p.m. | at St. Francis (PA) | Pine Bowl; Loretto, PA | W 60–7 | |
| September 30 | 12:30 p.m. | Albany | Seawolves Field; Stony Brook, NY (rivalry) | L 14–47 | |
| October 7 | 1:00 p.m. | at Wagner | Wagner College Stadium; Staten Island, NY | L 9–35 | |
| October 14 | 12:30 p.m. | Sacred Heart | Seawolves Field; Stony Brook, NY | L 6–23 | |
| October 21 | 1:00 p.m. | at Monmouth | Kessler Field; West Long Branch, NJ | L 7–34 | |
| October 28 | 1:00 p.m. | at Jacksonville* | D. B. Milne Field; Jacksonville, FL | L 14–17 | 1,061 |
| November 11 | 1:00 p.m. | at Central Connecticut State | Arute Field; New Britain, CT | L 34–35 | |
| November 18 | 12:30 p.m. | Robert Morris (PA) | Seawolves Field; Stony Brook, NY | L 6–36 | 499 |
*Non-conference game; All times are in Eastern time
