= 2003 Robert Morris Colonials football team =

American college football season

2003 Robert Morris Colonials football
- Conference: Northeast Conference
- Record: 6–4 (4–3 NEC)
- Head coach: Joe Walton (10th season)
- Defensive coordinator: Dan Radakovich (9th season)
- Home stadium: Moon Stadium

2003 Northeast Conference football standings
| | Conf. | | | Overall |
| Team | W | | L | W | | L |
|---|---|---|---|---|---|---|
| Monmouth + | 6 | – | 1 | 10 | – | 2 |
| Albany + | 6 | – | 1 | 7 | – | 4 |
| Robert Morris | 4 | – | 3 | 6 | – | 4 |
| Stony Brook | 4 | – | 3 | 6 | – | 4 |
| Sacred Heart | 3 | – | 4 | 6 | – | 5 |
| Wagner | 3 | – | 4 | 6 | – | 5 |
| Central Connecticut State | 2 | – | 4 | 3 | – | 8 |
| Saint Francis (PA) | 0 | – | 7 | 1 | – | 9 |
+ – Conference co-champions

The 2003 Robert Morris Colonials football team represented Robert Morris University as a member of the Northeast Conference (NEC) during the 2003 NCAA Division I-AA football season. The Colonials were led by 10th-year head coach Joe Walton and played their home games at Moon Stadium on the campus of Moon Area High School.

== Schedule ==
| Date | Opponent | Site | Result | Attendance |
|---|---|---|---|---|
| September 6 | at Buffalo State* | Coyer Field; Buffalo, NY | W 33–23 | 1,445 |
| September 13 | at Monmouth | Kessler Field; West Long Branch, NJ | L 10–17 | 2,106 |
| September 20 | at Saint Peter's* | Cochrane Stadium; Jersey City, NJ | W 31–24 | 523 |
| September 27 | Saint Francis | Moon Stadium; Moon Township, PA | W 36–6 | 1,317 |
| October 4 | Stony Brook | Moon Stadium; Moon Township, PA | W 23–20 | 1,638 |
| October 11 | at Central Connecticut State | Arute Field; New Britain, CT | W 27–17 | 1,946 |
| October 18 | Sacred Heart | Moon Stadium; Moon Township, PA | L 20–24 | 1,033 |
| October 25 | Wagner | Moon Stadium; Moon Township, PA | W 31–28 | 1,008 |
| November 8 | at Albany | University Field; Albany, NY | L 7–27 | 1,270 |
| November 15 | at Duquesne* | Rooney Field; Pittsburgh, PA | L 28–33 | 4,219 |
*Non-conference game
