= 2003 La Salle Explorers football team =

American college football season

2003 La Salle Explorers football
- Conference: Metro Atlantic Athletic Conference
- Record: 3–8 (2–3 MAAC)
- Head coach: Archie Stalcup (2nd season)
- Home stadium: McCarthy Stadium

2003 Metro Atlantic Athletic Conference football standings
	Conf.			Overall
Team	W		L	W		L
Duquesne $	5	–	0	8	–	3
Iona	4	–	1	6	–	5
Marist	2	–	3	4	–	6
La Salle	2	–	3	3	–	8
Saint Peter's	2	–	3	2	–	8
Siena	0	–	5	0	–	11
$ – Conference champion

The 2003 La Salle Explorers football team was an American football team that represented La Salle University as a member of the Metro Atlantic Athletic Conference (MAAC) during the 2003 NCAA Division I-AA football season. In their second year under head coach Archie Stalcup, the Explorers compiled a 3–8 record.

== Schedule ==
Date	Opponent	Site	Result	Attendance	Source
September 6	at Wagner*	Wagner College Stadium; Staten Island, NY	L 6–10	1,852	
September 13	Geneva*	McCarthy Stadium; Philadelphia, PA	L 20–37	1,331	
September 20	at TCNJ*	Lions Stadium; Ewing, NJ	W 28–27		
September 27	at Duquesne	Arthur J. Rooney Athletic Field; Pittsburgh, PA	L 14–62		
October 4	Saint Francis (PA)*	McCarthy Stadium; Philadelphia, PA	L 27–33	1,458	
October 11	at Marist	Leonidoff Field; Poughkeepsie, NY	W 33–31	3,055	
October 18	Catholic University*	McCarthy Stadium; Philadelphia, PA	L 31–32	1,041	
October 25	Monmouth*	McCarthy Stadium; Philadelphia, PA	L 0–50	2,241	
November 1	Iona	McCarthy Stadium; Philadelphia, PA	L 20–26	1,011	
November 8	at Siena	Heritage Park; Colonie, NY	W 34–7	350	
November 15	Saint Peter's	McCarthy Stadium; Philadelphia, PA	L 20–38	1,113	
*Non-conference game
