= 2009 Albany Great Danes football team =

American college football season

2009 Albany Great Danes football
- Conference: Northeast Conference
- Record: 7–4 (6–2 NEC)
- Head coach: Bob Ford (40th season)
- Offensive coordinator: Ryan McCarthy (2nd season)
- Defensive coordinator: Mike Simpson (23rd season)
- Home stadium: University Field

2009 Northeast Conference football standings
	Conf.			Overall
Team	W		L	W		L
Central Connecticut State $	7	–	1	9	–	3
Albany	6	–	2	7	–	4
Wagner	5	–	3	6	–	5
Robert Morris	5	–	3	5	–	6
Monmouth	4	–	4	5	–	6
Bryant	4	–	4	5	–	6
Duquesne	2	–	6	3	–	8
Sacred Heart	2	–	6	2	–	8
Saint Francis (PA)	1	–	7	2	–	9
$ – Conference champion

The 2009 Albany Great Danes football team represented the University at Albany, SUNY as a member of the Northeast Conference (NEC) during the 2009 NCAA Division I FCS football season. Led by 40-year head coach Bob Ford, the Great Danes compiled an overall record of 7–4 with a mark of 6–2 in conference play, placing second in the NEC. The team played home games at University Field in Albany New York.

== Schedule ==
Date	Time	Opponent	Site	Result	Attendance	Source
September 5	6:00 pm	at Georgia Southern*	Paulson Stadium; Statesboro, GA	L 26–29	18,118	
September 12	6:00 pm	at No. 17 UMass*	McGuirk Stadium; Hadley, MA	L 7–44	13,215	
September 19	4:00 pm	No. 20 Maine*	University Field; Albany, NY	W 20–16	4,823	
September 26	4:00 pm	Sacred Heart	University Field; Albany, NY	W 22–9	3,188	
October 3	1:00 pm	Saint Francis (PA)	DeGol Field; Loretto, PA	W 27–6	1,591	
October 10	1:00 pm	Duquesne^{†}	University Field; Albany, NY	W 55–10	6,255	
October 17	1:00 pm	Bryant	University Field; Albany, NY	W 20–17	2,824	
October 24	1:00 pm	at Monmouth	Kessler Field; West Long Branch, NJ	W 35–10	3,782	
October 31	12:00 pm	at Central Connecticut State	Arute Field; New Britain, CT	L 29–31	3,698	
November 7	1:00 pm	Robert Morris	University Field; Albany, NY	L 10–13	2,518	
November 21	1:00 pm	at Wagner	Wagner College Stadium; Staten Island, NY	W 41–28	3,335	
*Non-conference game; ^{†}Homecoming; Rankings from The Sports Network Poll released prior to the game; All times are in Eastern time
