= 2000 Wagner Seahawks football team =

American college football season

2000 Wagner Seahawks football
- Conference: Northeast Conference
- Record: 6–5 (6–2 NEC)
- Head coach: Walt Hameline (20th season)
- Home stadium: Wagner College Stadium

2000 Northeast Conference football standings
| | Conf. | | | Overall |
| Team | W | | L | W | | L |
|---|---|---|---|---|---|---|
| Robert Morris $ | 8 | – | 0 | 10 | – | 0 |
| Sacred Heart | 7 | – | 1 | 10 | – | 1 |
| Wagner | 6 | – | 2 | 6 | – | 5 |
| Albany | 5 | – | 3 | 5 | – | 6 |
| Monmouth | 4 | – | 4 | 5 | – | 6 |
| Central Connecticut State | 3 | – | 5 | 4 | – | 6 |
| St. John's | 2 | – | 6 | 5 | – | 6 |
| Stony Brook | 1 | – | 7 | 2 | – | 8 |
| Saint Francis (PA) | 0 | – | 8 | 0 | – | 11 |
$ – Conference champion

The 2000 Wagner Seahawks football team represented Wagner College in the 2000 NCAA Division I-AA football season as a member of the Northeast Conference (NEC). The Seahawks were led by 20th-year head coach Walt Hameline and played their home games at Wagner College Stadium. Wagner finished the season 6–5 overall and 6–2 in NEC play to place third.

== Schedule ==
| Date | Time | Opponent | Site | Result | Attendance | Source |
|---|---|---|---|---|---|---|
| September 9 | | Monmouth | Wagner College Stadium; Staten Island, NY | W 14–7 | | |
| September 16 | | Georgetown* | Wagner College Stadium; Staten Island, NY | L 21-28 | 1,486 | |
| September 23 | | at Albany | University Field; Albany, NY | W 38–30 | | |
| September 30 | | Marist* | Wagner College Stadium; Staten Island, NY | L 31–34 | | |
| October 7 | 1:00 p.m. | Stony Brook | Wagner College Stadium; Staten Island, NY | W 35–9 | | |
| October 14 | | at Central Connecticut State | Arute Field; New Britain, CT | W 24–7 | | |
| October 21 | | at Saint Francis (PA) | Pine Bowl; Loretto, PA | W 35–6 | | |
| October 28 | | Robert Morris | Wagner College Stadium; Staten Island, NY | L 31–38 ^{OT} | 1,782 | |
| November 4 | | St. John's | Wagner College Stadium; Staten Island, NY | W 35–3 | | |
| November 11 | | at Jacksonville* | D. B. Milne Field; Jacksonville, FL | L 22–31 | 1,813 | |
| November 18 | | at Sacred Heart | Campus Field; Fairfield, CT | L 20–22 | | |
*Non-conference game; All times are in Eastern time
