= 2009 Duquesne Dukes football team =

American college football season

2009 Duquesne Dukes football
- Conference: Northeast Conference
- Record: 3–8 (2–6 NEC)
- Head coach: Jerry Schmitt (5th season)
- Offensive coordinator: Gary Dunn (1st season)
- Defensive coordinator: Ollie Phillips (1st season)
- Home stadium: Arthur J. Rooney Field

2009 Northeast Conference football standings
	Conf.			Overall
Team	W		L	W		L
Central Connecticut State $	7	–	1	9	–	3
Albany	6	–	2	7	–	4
Wagner	5	–	3	6	–	5
Robert Morris	5	–	3	5	–	6
Monmouth	4	–	4	5	–	6
Bryant	4	–	4	5	–	6
Duquesne	2	–	6	3	–	8
Sacred Heart	2	–	6	2	–	8
Saint Francis (PA)	1	–	7	2	–	9
$ – Conference champion

The 2009 Duquesne Dukes football team represented Duquesne University as a member of the Northeast Conference (NEC) during the 2009 NCAA Division I FCS football season. The Dukes were led by fifth-year head coach Jerry Schmitt and played their home games at Arthur J. Rooney Athletic Field. They finished the season 3–8 overall and 2–6 in conference play, tying for seventh place in the NEC.

== Schedule ==
Date	Time	Opponent	Site	Result	Attendance	Source
September 5	6:00 pm	Bucknell*	Arthur J. Rooney Athletic Field; Pittsburgh, PA	W 24–19	1,867	
September 12	2:00 pm	at Nicholls State*	John L. Guidry Stadium; Thibodaux, LA	L 7–14	5,383	
September 19	12:00 pm	at Monmouth	Kessler Field; West Long Branch, NJ	L 10–17	3,233	
September 26	1:00 pm	at Dayton*	Welcome Stadium; Dayton, OH	L 17–24	5,153	
October 3	1:00 pm	Robert Morris^{†}	Arthur J. Rooney Athletic Field; Pittsburgh, PA	W 34–20	2,577	
October 10	1:00 pm	at Albany	University Field; Albany, NY	L 10–55	6,255	
October 17	12:00 pm	Central Connecticut State	Arthur J. Rooney Athletic Field; Pittsburgh, PA	L 24–31	572	
October 24	7:00 pm	at Saint Francis (PA)	DeGol Field; Loretto, PA	L 14–31	1,231	
October 31	12:00 pm	Wagner	Arthur J. Rooney Athletic Field; Pittsburgh, PA	L 17–23 ^{2OT}	527	
November 14	12:00 pm	at Sacred Heart	Campus Field; Fairfield, CT	W 45–42	1,009	
November 21	12:00 pm	Bryant	Arthur J. Rooney Athletic Field; Pittsburgh, PA	L 0–20	825	
*Non-conference game; ^{†}Homecoming; All times are in Eastern time
