= 2009 Central Connecticut State Blue Devils football team =

American college football season

2009 Central Connecticut State Blue Devils football

NEC champion

Gridiron Classic, L 23–28 at Butler
- Conference: Northeast Conference
- Record: 9–3 (7–1 NEC)
- Head coach: Jeff McInerney (4th season)
- Offensive coordinator: Rob Likens (4th season)
- Defensive coordinator: Ryan Nielsen (2nd season)
- Home stadium: Arute Field

2009 Northeast Conference football standings
	Conf.			Overall
Team	W		L	W		L
Central Connecticut State $	7	–	1	9	–	3
Albany	6	–	2	7	–	4
Wagner	5	–	3	6	–	5
Robert Morris	5	–	3	5	–	6
Monmouth	4	–	4	5	–	6
Bryant	4	–	4	5	–	6
Duquesne	2	–	6	3	–	8
Sacred Heart	2	–	6	2	–	8
Saint Francis (PA)	1	–	7	2	–	9
$ – Conference champion

The 2009 Central Connecticut State Blue Devils football team represented Central Connecticut State University as a member of the Northeast Conference (NEC) during the 2009 NCAA Division I FCS football season. Led by fourth-year head coach Jeff McInerney, the Blue Devils compiled an overall record of 9–3 with a mark of 7–1 in conference play, winning the NEC. Central Connecticut State represented the NEC in the Gridiron Classic, losing to Butler, co-champion of the Pioneer Football League (PFL). The Blue Devils played home games at Arute Field in New Britain, Connecticut.

== Schedule ==
Date	Time	Opponent	Site	Result	Attendance	Source
September 5	12:30 pm	at Lehigh*	Goodman Stadium; Bethlehem, PA	W 28–21	6,140	
September 12	7:00 pm	at No. 7 William & Mary*	Zable Stadium; Williamsburg, VA	L 14–33	9,546	
September 26	12:30 pm	at Columbia*	Robert K. Kraft Field at Lawrence A. Wien Stadium; New York, NY	W 22–13	3,089	
October 3	11:00 a.m.	Sacred Heart	Arute Field; New Britain, CT	W 24–10	3,176	
October 10	12:00 p.m.	Robert Morris	Arute Field; New Britain, CT	W 42–21	2,654	
October 17	12:00 p.m.	at Duquesne	Arthur J. Rooney Athletic Field; Pittsburgh, PA	W 31–24	572	
October 24	1:00 pm	at Bryant	Bulldog Stadium; Smithfield, RI	W 24–23	2,566	
October 31	12:00 p.m.	Albany	Arute Field; New Britain, CT	W 31–29	3,698	
November 7	1:00 p.m.	at Wagner	Wagner College Stadium; Staten Island, NY	L 27–32	1,910	
November 14	12:00 p.m.	Monmouth	Arute Field; New Britain, CT	W 20–19	1,497	
November 21	12:00 p.m.	at Saint Francis (PA)	DeGol Field; Loretto, PA	W 14–13		
December 5	12:00 pm	at Butler*	Butler Bowl; Indianapolis, IN (Gridiron Classic)	L 23–28	1,577	
*Non-conference game; Rankings from STATS Poll released prior to the game; All times are in Eastern time
