= 1999 Monmouth Hawks football team =

American college football season

1999 Monmouth Hawks football
- Conference: Northeast Conference
- Record: 2–8 (2–5 NEC)
- Head coach: Kevin Callahan (7th season)
- Offensive coordinator: Rich Skrosky (3rd season)
- Offensive scheme: Multiple
- Defensive coordinator: Andy Bobik (6th season)
- Base defense: 4–3
- Home stadium: Kessler Field

1999 Northeast Conference football standings
	Conf.			Overall
Team	W		L	W		L
Robert Morris $	7	–	0	8	–	2
Albany	6	–	1	7	–	2
Wagner	5	–	2	5	–	5
Stony Brook	4	–	3	5	–	5
Central Connecticut State	3	–	4	4	–	6
Monmouth	2	–	5	2	–	8
Saint Francis (PA)	1	–	6	2	–	9
Sacred Heart	0	–	7	2	–	9
$ – Conference champion

The 1999 Monmouth Hawks football team represented Monmouth University in the 1999 NCAA Division I-AA football season as a member of the Northeast Conference (NEC). The Hawks were led by seventh-year head coach Kevin Callahan and played their home games at Kessler Field. They finished the season 2–8 overall and 2–5 in NEC play to place sixth.

== Schedule ==
Date	Opponent	Site	Result
September 4	at Towson*	Towson Stadium; Towson, MD	L 7–34
September 11	Albany	Kessler Field; West Long Branch, NJ	L 16–24
September 18	at Lehigh*	Goodman Stadium; Bethlehem, PA	L 10–56
September 25	at Stony Brook	Seawolves Field; Stony Brook, NY	L 3–7
October 9	C.W. Post*	Kessler Field; West Long Branch, NJ	L 26–30
October 16	at Saint Francis (PA)	Pine Bowl; Loretto, PA	W 20–9
October 23	Robert Morris	Kessler Field; West Long Branch, NJ	L 16–34
October 30	at Sacred Heart	Campus Field; Fairfield, CT	W 37–17
November 6	Wagner	Kessler Field; West Long Branch, NJ	L 3–35
November 13	at Central Connecticut State	Arute Field; New Britain, CT	L 21–28
*Non-conference game
