= 1998 Wagner Seahawks football team =

American college football season

1998 Wagner Seahawks football
- Conference: Northeast Conference
- Record: 7–3 (3–2 NEC)
- Head coach: Walt Hameline (18th season)
- Home stadium: Wagner College Stadium

1998 Northeast Conference football standings
	Conf.			Overall
Team	W		L	W		L
Monmouth +	4	–	1	5	–	5
Robert Morris +	4	–	1	4	–	6
Wagner	3	–	2	7	–	3
Central Connecticut State	3	–	2	4	–	6
Sacred Heart	1	–	4	2	–	8
Saint Francis (PA)	0	–	5	0	–	10
+ – Conference co-champions

The 1998 Wagner Seahawks football team represented Wagner College in the 1998 NCAA Division I-AA football season as a member of the Northeast Conference (NEC). The Seahawks were led by 18th-year head coach Walt Hameline and played their home games at Wagner College Stadium. Wagner finished the season 7–3 overall and 3–2 in NEC play to tie for second place.

== Schedule ==
Date	Opponent	Site	Result	Attendance
September 12	San Diego*	Wagner College Stadium; Staten Island, NY	L 30–42	
September 19	at Sacred Heart	Campus Field; Fairfield, CT	W 40-8	
September 26	at Saint Francis (PA)	Pine Bowl; Loretto, PA	W 45–14	
October 3	Robert Morris	Wagner College Stadium; Staten Island, NY	L 17–42	1,194
October 10	Saint Peter's*	Wagner College Stadium; Staten Island, NY	W 34–7	
October 17	at Central Connecticut State	Arute Field; New Britain, CT	W 21–17	
October 24	Marist*	Wagner College Stadium; Staten Island, NY	W 17–14	
October 31	at Stony Brook*	Seawolves Field; Stony Brook, NY	W 14–13	503
November 7	Monmouth	Wagner College Stadium; Staten Island, NY	L 20–48	
November 15	at Jacksonville*	D. B. Milne Field; Jacksonville, FL	W 62–44	
*Non-conference game
