= 2009 Monmouth Hawks football team =

American college football season

2009 Monmouth Hawks football
- Conference: Northeast Conference
- Record: 5–6 (4–4 NEC)
- Head coach: Kevin Callahan (17th season)
- Offensive coordinator: Scott Van Zile (2nd season)
- Offensive scheme: Multiple
- Defensive coordinator: Andy Bobik (16th season)
- Base defense: 4–3
- Home stadium: Kessler Field

2009 Northeast Conference football standings
	Conf.			Overall
Team	W		L	W		L
Central Connecticut State $	7	–	1	9	–	3
Albany	6	–	2	7	–	4
Wagner	5	–	3	6	–	5
Robert Morris	5	–	3	5	–	6
Monmouth	4	–	4	5	–	6
Bryant	4	–	4	5	–	6
Duquesne	2	–	6	3	–	8
Sacred Heart	2	–	6	2	–	8
Saint Francis (PA)	1	–	7	2	–	9
$ – Conference champion

The 2009 Monmouth Hawks football team represented Monmouth University in the 2009 NCAA Division I FCS football season as a member of the Northeast Conference (NEC). The Hawks were led by 17th-year head coach Kevin Callahan and played their home games at Kessler Field. They finished the season 5–6 overall and 4–4 in NEC play to tie for fourth place.

== Schedule ==
Date	Time	Opponent	Site	Result	Attendance
September 5	6:00 p.m.	at Colgate*	Andy Kerr Stadium; Hamilton, NY	L 23–35	5,263
September 12	12:00 p.m.	at Coastal Carolina*	Brooks Stadium; Conway, SC	L 17–24	6,817
September 19	12:00 p.m.	Duquesne	Kessler Field; West Long Branch, NJ	W 17–10	3,233
September 26	6:00 p.m.	at Old Dominion*	Foreman Field; Norfolk, VA	W 31–28	19,782
October 10	1:00 p.m.	Wagner	Kessler Field; West Long Branch, NJ	L 24–27	2,993
October 17	1:00 p.m.	at Sacred Heart	Campus Field; Fairfield, CT	W 42–20	2,804
October 24	1:00 p.m.	Albany	Kessler Field; West Long Branch, NJ	L 10–35	3,782
October 31	1:00 p.m.	Bryant	Kessler Field; West Long Branch, NJ	W 10–6	2,976
November 7	1:00 p.m.	at Saint Francis (PA)	DeGol Field; Loretto, PA	W 24–10	1,781
November 14	12:00 p.m.	at Central Connecticut State	Arute Field; New Britain, CT	L 19–20	1,497
November 21	12:00 p.m.	Robert Morris	Kessler Field; West Long Branch, NJ	L 9–23	1,291
*Non-conference game; All times are in Eastern time
