= 1998 Robert Morris Colonials football team =

American college football season

1998 Robert Morris Colonials football

NEC co-champion
- Conference: Northeast Conference
- Record: 4–6 (4–1 NEC)
- Head coach: Joe Walton (5th season)
- Defensive coordinator: Dan Radakovich (4th season)
- Home stadium: Moon Stadium

1998 Northeast Conference football standings
	Conf.			Overall
Team	W		L	W		L
Monmouth +	4	–	1	5	–	5
Robert Morris +	4	–	1	4	–	6
Wagner	3	–	2	7	–	3
Central Connecticut State	3	–	2	4	–	6
Sacred Heart	1	–	4	2	–	8
Saint Francis (PA)	0	–	5	0	–	10
+ – Conference co-champions

The 1998 Robert Morris Colonials football team represented Robert Morris College, now Robert Morris University, as a member of the Northeast Conference (NEC) during the 1998 NCAA Division I-AA football season. The Colonials were led by 5th-year head coach Joe Walton and played their home games at Moon Stadium on the campus of Moon Area High School. The Colonials finished the 1998 season with their third consecutive NEC championship.

== Schedule ==
Date	Opponent	Site	Result	Attendance
September 5	at Buffalo State*	Coyer Field; Buffalo, NY	L 20–30	762
September 12	at Dayton*	Welcome Stadium; Dayton, OH	L 22–31	4,376
September 26	Central Connecticut State	Moon Stadium; Moon Township, PA	W 42–17	2,673
October 3	at Wagner	Wagner College Stadium; Staten Island, NY	W 42–17	1,194
October 10	Valparaiso*	Moon Stadium; Moon Township, PA	L 17–19	1,649
October 17	Sacred Heart	Moon Stadium; Moon Township, PA	W 44–7	1,081
October 24	Monmouth	Moon Stadium; Moon Township, PA	L 26–27	1,258
November 7	at Saint Francis	Pine Bowl; Loretto, PA	W 35–3	819
November 14	New Haven*	Moon Stadium; Moon Township, PA	L 24–26	1,192
November 21	at Duquesne*	Rooney Field; Pittsburgh, PA	L 22–24	2,872
*Non-conference game
