= 2003 Saint Francis Red Flash football team =

American college football season

2003 Saint Francis Red Flash football
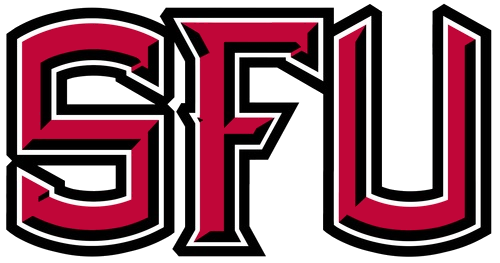
- Conference: Northeast Conference
- Record: 1–9 (0–7 NEC)
- Head coach: Dave Opfar (2nd season)
- Home stadium: Pine Bowl

2003 Northeast Conference football standings
	Conf.			Overall
Team	W		L	W		L
Monmouth +	6	–	1	10	–	2
Albany +	6	–	1	7	–	4
Robert Morris	4	–	3	6	–	4
Stony Brook	4	–	3	6	–	4
Sacred Heart	3	–	4	6	–	5
Wagner	3	–	4	6	–	5
Central Connecticut State	2	–	4	3	–	8
Saint Francis (PA)	0	–	7	1	–	9
+ – Conference co-champions

The 2003 Saint Francis Red Flash football team represented Saint Francis University as a member of the Northeast Conference (NEC) during the 2003 NCAA Division I-AA football season. The Red Flash were led by third-year head coach Dave Opfar and played their home games at the Pine Bowl. They finished the season 1–9 overall and 0–7 in NEC play to place last.

== Schedule ==
Date	Time	Opponent	Site	Result	Attendance	Source
September 6	1:00 p.m.	Gannon*	Pine Bowl; Loretto, PA	L 20–52	1,253	
September 13	1:00 p.m.	at Sacred Heart	Campus Field; Fairfield, CT	L 12–37	2,502	
September 20	1:00 p.m.	at Valparaiso*	Brown Field; Valparaiso, IN	L 6–38	1,259	
September 27	1:30 p.m.	at Robert Morris	Moon Stadium; Moon Township, PA	L 6–36	1,317	
October 4	1:00 p.m.	at La Salle*	McCarthy Stadium; Philadelphia, PA	W 33–27	1,438	
October 11	1:00 p.m.	Albany	Pine Bowl; Loretto, PA	L 21–44	720	
October 18	4:00 p.m.	at Stony Brook	Kenneth P. LaValle Stadium; Stony Brook, NY	L 14–49	6,079	
October 25	1:00 p.m.	Central Connecticut State	Pine Bowl; Loretto, PA	L 28–35	1,252	
November 8	1:00 p.m.	at Wagner	Wagner College Stadium; Staten Island, NY	L 7–21	3,100	
November 15	1:00 p.m.	Monmouth	Pine Bowl; Loretto, PA	L 21–28	764	
*Non-conference game; All times are in Eastern time
