= 1998 Monmouth Hawks football team =

American college football season

1998 Monmouth Hawks football

NEC co-champion
- Conference: Northeast Conference
- Record: 5–5 (4–1 NEC)
- Head coach: Kevin Callahan (6th season)
- Offensive coordinator: Rich Skrosky (2nd season)
- Offensive scheme: Multiple
- Defensive coordinator: Andy Bobik (5th season)
- Base defense: 4–3
- Home stadium: Kessler Field

1998 Northeast Conference football standings
	Conf.			Overall
Team	W		L	W		L
Monmouth +	4	–	1	5	–	5
Robert Morris +	4	–	1	4	–	6
Wagner	3	–	2	7	–	3
Central Connecticut State	3	–	2	4	–	6
Sacred Heart	1	–	4	2	–	8
Saint Francis (PA)	0	–	5	0	–	10
+ – Conference co-champions

The 1998 Monmouth Hawks football team represented Monmouth University in the 1998 NCAA Division I-AA football season as a member of the Northeast Conference (NEC). The Hawks were led by sixth-year head coach Kevin Callahan and played their home games at Kessler Field. They finished the season 5–5 overall and 4–1 in NEC play to share the conference championship with Robert Morris. Though they finished atop the conference standings, the Hawks’ poor non-conference record prohibited them from receiving a spot in the postseason.

== Schedule ==
Date	Opponent	Site	Result	Source
September 5	Dayton*	Kessler Field; West Long Branch, NJ	L 14–27	
September 12	Towson*	Kessler Field; West Long Branch, NJ	L 20–42	
September 19	at Albany*	University Field; Albany, NY	L 28–31	
October 3	at La Salle*	McCarthy Stadium; Philadelphia, PA	W 41–7	
October 10	at C.W. Post*	Brookville, NY	L 22–27	
October 17	Saint Francis (PA)	Kessler Field; West Long Branch, NJ	W 33–14	
October 24	at Robert Morris	Moon Stadium; Moon Township, PA	W 27–26	
October 31	Sacred Heart	Kessler Field; West Long Branch, NJ	W 57–7	
November 7	at Wagner	Wagner College Stadium; Staten Island, NY	W 48–20	
November 14	Central Connecticut State	Kessler Field; West Long Branch, NJ	L 13–17	
*Non-conference game
