= 2003 Wagner Seahawks football team =

American college football season

2003 Wagner Seahawks football
- Conference: Northeast Conference
- Record: 6–5 (3–4 NEC)
- Head coach: Walt Hameline (23rd season)
- Home stadium: Wagner College Stadium

2003 Northeast Conference football standings
	Conf.			Overall
Team	W		L	W		L
Monmouth +	6	–	1	10	–	2
Albany +	6	–	1	7	–	4
Robert Morris	4	–	3	6	–	4
Stony Brook	4	–	3	6	–	4
Sacred Heart	3	–	4	6	–	5
Wagner	3	–	4	6	–	5
Central Connecticut State	2	–	4	3	–	8
Saint Francis (PA)	0	–	7	1	–	9
+ – Conference co-champions

The 2003 Wagner Seahawks football team represented Wagner College in the 2003 NCAA Division I-AA football season as a member of the Northeast Conference (NEC). The Seahawks were led by 23rd-year head coach Walt Hameline and played their home games at Wagner College Stadium. Wagner finished the season 6–5 overall and 3–4 in NEC play to tie for fifth place.

== Schedule ==
Date	Time	Opponent	Site	Result	Attendance	Source
September 6	1:00 p.m.	La Salle*	Wagner College Stadium; Staten Island, NY	W 10–6	1,852	
September 13	1:00 p.m.	at Iona*	Mazzella Field; New Rochelle, NY	W 34–17	1,035	
September 20	6:00 p.m.	at Stony Brook	Kenneth P. LaValle Stadium; Stony Brook, NY	L 21–28	4,697	
September 27	1:00 p.m.	Marist*	Wagner College Stadium; Staten Island, NY	L 13–24	2,422	
October 4	1:00 p.m.	Central Connecticut State	Wagner College Stadium; Staten Island, NY	W 39–16	1,372	
October 11	1:00 p.m.	at Monmouth	Kessler Field; West Long Branch, NJ	L 0–24	3,536	
October 18	7:00 p.m.	at Siena*	Heritage Park; Colonie, NY	W 34–6	578	
October 25	1:00 p.m.	at Robert Morris	Moon Stadium; Moon Township, PA	L 28–31	1,008	
November 1	1:00 p.m.	Albany	Wagner College Stadium; Staten Island, NY	L 7–28	1,011	
November 8	1:00 p.m.	Saint Francis (PA)	Wagner College Stadium; Staten Island, NY	W 21–7	3,100	
November 15	1:00 p.m.	Sacred Heart	Wagner College Stadium; Staten Island, NY	W 24–16	1,124	
*Non-conference game; All times are in Eastern time
