= 1999 Wagner Seahawks football team =

American college football season

1999 Wagner Seahawks football
- Conference: Northeast Conference
- Record: 5–5 (5–2 NEC)
- Head coach: Walt Hameline (19th season)
- Home stadium: Wagner College Stadium

1999 Northeast Conference football standings
	Conf.			Overall
Team	W		L	W		L
Robert Morris $	7	–	0	8	–	2
Albany	6	–	1	7	–	2
Wagner	5	–	2	5	–	5
Stony Brook	4	–	3	5	–	5
Central Connecticut State	3	–	4	4	–	6
Monmouth	2	–	5	2	–	8
Saint Francis (PA)	1	–	6	2	–	9
Sacred Heart	0	–	7	2	–	9
$ – Conference champion

The 1999 Wagner Seahawks football team represented Wagner College in the 1999 NCAA Division I-AA football season as a member of the Northeast Conference (NEC). The Seahawks were led by 19th-year head coach Walt Hameline and played their home games at Wagner College Stadium. Wagner finished the season 5–5 overall and 5–2 in NEC play to place third.

== Schedule ==
Date	Opponent	Site	Result	Attendance	Source
September 11	at Stony Brook	Seawolves Field; Stony Brook, NY	W 24–12		
September 18	Sacred Heart	Wagner College Stadium; Staten Island, NY	W 33-0		
September 25	Saint Francis (PA)	Wagner College Stadium; Staten Island, NY	W 45–13		
October 2	at Robert Morris	Moon Stadium; Moon Township, PA	L 21–23		
October 9	Albany	Wagner College Stadium; Staten Island, NY	L 21–37		
October 16	Central Connecticut State	Wagner College Stadium; Staten Island, NY	W 35–16		
October 23	at Marist*	Leonidoff Field; Poughkeepsie, NY	L 17–20		
October 30	at Cornell*	Schoellkopf Field; Ithaca, NY	L 14–31	8,124	
November 6	at Monmouth	Kessler Field; West Long Branch, NJ	W 35–3		
November 13	at San Diego*	Torero Stadium; San Diego, CA	L 12–31		
*Non-conference game
