= 2000 Robert Morris Colonials football team =

American college football season

2000 Robert Morris Colonials football

NEC champion
- Conference: Northeast Conference
- Record: 10–0 (8–0 NEC)
- Head coach: Joe Walton (7th season)
- Defensive coordinator: Dan Radakovich (6th season)
- Home stadium: Moon Stadium

2000 Northeast Conference football standings
	Conf.			Overall
Team	W		L	W		L
Robert Morris $	8	–	0	10	–	0
Sacred Heart	7	–	1	10	–	1
Wagner	6	–	2	6	–	5
Albany	5	–	3	5	–	6
Monmouth	4	–	4	5	–	6
Central Connecticut State	3	–	5	4	–	6
St. John's	2	–	6	5	–	6
Stony Brook	1	–	7	2	–	8
Saint Francis (PA)	0	–	8	0	–	11
$ – Conference champion

The 2000 Robert Morris Colonials football team represented Robert Morris College, now Robert Morris University, as a member of the Northeast Conference (NEC) during the 2000 NCAA Division I-AA football season. The Colonials were led by 7th-year head coach Joe Walton and played their home games at Moon Stadium on the campus of Moon Area High School. The Colonials finished the 2000 season with their fifth consecutive NEC championship.

== Schedule ==
Date	Opponent	Site	Result	Attendance
September 2	Buffalo State*	Moon Stadium; Moon Township, PA	W 30–20	2,151
September 16	Monmouth	Moon Stadium; Moon Township, PA	W 23–7	1,004
September 30	at Saint Francis	Pine Bowl; Loretto, PA	W 63–0	1,231
October 7	St. John's	Moon Stadium; Moon Township, PA	W 43–6	2,867
October 14	at Dayton*	Welcome Stadium; Dayton, OH	W 17–13	9,615
October 21	Central Connecticut State	Moon Stadium; Moon Township, PA	W 41–3	1,259
October 28	at Wagner	Wagner College Stadium; Staten Island, NY	W 38–31 ^{OT}	1,782
November 4	at Sacred Heart	Campus Field; Fairfield, CT	W 31–20	1,236
November 11	Albany	Moon Stadium; Moon Township, PA	W 43–34	3,346
November 18	at Stony Brook	Seawolves Field; Stony Brook, NY	W 36–6	499
*Non-conference game

== Game summaries ==
=== Buffalo State ===
	1	2	3	4	Total
Bengals	7	7	0	6	20
Colonials	6	10	7	7	30

To open the season, the Colonials hosted the Buffalo State Bengals, from Buffalo State College (SUNY College at Buffalo) at Moon Stadium, on the campus of Moon Area High School. The two teams had met three times before, with Robert Morris winning their first meeting in 1997 and Buffalo State taking the following two in 1998 and 1999.

The season-opening contest got off to a relatively slow start offensively, as Robert Morris kicker Jeff Carlo successfully converted two field goals, from 20 and 21 yards, to put the Colonials on the scoreboard first in the 2000 season. Their narrow lead was soon eclipsed, as Buffalo State's Brandon Janesz found the end zone on a 1-yard rush, and a PAT from Ryan Cox put the Bengals in front by one. The teams traded touchdowns in the second quarter, as RMU quarterback Tim Levcik found Sam Dorsett for an 8-yard touchdown before Buffalo State's Chris Henry capped a 99-yard touchdown drive by converting an 8-yard rush to put the Bengals back up top. The Bengals' lead would not stand for long; Jeff Carlo's 55-yard field goal, a kick that broke the school record (held by Carlo himself) by five yards, gave the halftime advantage to the Colonials, 16–14.

The third quarter's only score came in the form of a Robert Morris touchdown, as Tim Levcik tossed his second touchdown pass of the game, this time to Opio Gary for fifteen yards. Robert Morris led 23–14 going into the game's final quarter, and the lead was extended by RMU running back Dante Settles, as he netted 30 of his 46 rushing yards on a touchdown dash that all but sealed the game. Buffalo State was able to find the end zone one final time, as Chris Henry found Lamar Wilson for a 15-yard touchdown pass, but the two-point conversion was not successful. There was no further scoring, and the Colonials won by a score of 30–20. This win improved the Colonials to 8–0 all-time in home openers, and to 2–2 against Buffalo State.
