= 2000 Monmouth Hawks football team =

American college football season

2000 Monmouth Hawks football
- Conference: Northeast Conference
- Record: 5–6 (4–4 NEC)
- Head coach: Kevin Callahan (8th season)
- Offensive coordinator: Rich Skrosky (4th season)
- Offensive scheme: Multiple
- Defensive coordinator: Andy Bobik (7th season)
- Base defense: 4–3
- Home stadium: Kessler Field

2000 Northeast Conference football standings
	Conf.			Overall
Team	W		L	W		L
Robert Morris $	8	–	0	10	–	0
Sacred Heart	7	–	1	10	–	1
Wagner	6	–	2	6	–	5
Albany	5	–	3	5	–	6
Monmouth	4	–	4	5	–	6
Central Connecticut State	3	–	5	4	–	6
St. John's	2	–	6	5	–	6
Stony Brook	1	–	7	2	–	8
Saint Francis (PA)	0	–	8	0	–	11
$ – Conference champion

The 2000 Monmouth Hawks football team represented Monmouth University in the 2000 NCAA Division I-AA football season as a member of the Northeast Conference (NEC). The Hawks were led by eighth-year head coach Kevin Callahan and played their home games at Kessler Field. They finished the season 5–6 overall and 4–4 in NEC play to place fifth.

== Schedule ==
Date	Opponent	Site	Result	Attendance	Source
September 9	at Wagner	Wagner College Stadium; Staten Island, NY	L 7–14		
September 16	at Robert Morris	Moon Stadium; Moon Township, PA	L 7–23	1,004	
September 23	Central Connecticut State	Kessler Field; West Long Branch, NJ	W 28–0		
September 30	Sacred Heart*	Kessler Field; West Long Branch, NJ	L 7–13		
October 7	at C.W. Post*	Brookville, NY	L 7–20		
October 14	Saint Francis (PA)	Kessler Field; West Long Branch, NJ	W 41–6		
October 21	Stony Brook	Kessler Field; West Long Branch, NJ	W 34–7		
October 28	Towson*	Kessler Field; West Long Branch, NJ	L 0–12	2,863	
November 4	at Albany	University Field; Albany, NY	L 10–37		
November 10	at St. John's	Queens, NY	W 27–14		
November 18	at Jacksonville*	D. B. Milne Field; Jacksonville, FL	W 32–28	1,013	
*Non-conference game
