= 2003 Stony Brook Seawolves football team =

American college football season

2003 Stony Brook Seawolves football
- Conference: Northeast Conference
- Record: 6–4 (4–3 NEC)
- Head coach: Sam Kornhauser (20th season)
- Home stadium: Kenneth P. LaValle Stadium

2003 Northeast Conference football standings
| | Conf. | | | Overall |
| Team | W | | L | W | | L |
|---|---|---|---|---|---|---|
| Monmouth + | 6 | – | 1 | 10 | – | 2 |
| Albany + | 6 | – | 1 | 7 | – | 4 |
| Robert Morris | 4 | – | 3 | 6 | – | 4 |
| Stony Brook | 4 | – | 3 | 6 | – | 4 |
| Sacred Heart | 3 | – | 4 | 6 | – | 5 |
| Wagner | 3 | – | 4 | 6 | – | 5 |
| Central Connecticut State | 2 | – | 4 | 3 | – | 8 |
| Saint Francis (PA) | 0 | – | 7 | 1 | – | 9 |
+ – Conference co-champions

The 2003 Stony Brook Seawolves football team represented Stony Brook University as a member of the Northeast Conference (NEC) during the 2003 NCAA Division I-AA football season. Led by 20th-year head coach Sam Kornhauser, the Seawolves compiled an overall record of 6–4 with a mark of 4–3 in conference place, tying for third place in the NEC. Stony Brook played home games at Kenneth P. LaValle Stadium in Stony Brook, New York.

== Schedule ==
| Date | Time | Opponent | Site | Result | Attendance | Source |
|---|---|---|---|---|---|---|
| September 13 | 6:00 p.m. | Siena* | Kenneth P. LaValle Stadium; Stony Brook, NY | W 31–3 | 3,645 | |
| September 20 | 6:00 p.m. | Wagner | Kenneth P. LaValle Stadium; Stony Brook, NY | W 28–21 | 4,697 | |
| September 27 | 6:00 p.m. | Monmouth | Kenneth P. LaValle Stadium; Stony Brook, NY | L 14–20 | 4,834 | |
| October 4 | 1:30 p.m. | at Robert Morris | Joe Walton Stadium; Moon Township, PA | L 20–23 | 1,638 | |
| October 11 | 2:00 p.m. | at Georgetown* | Multi-Sport Field; Washington, DC | L 21–49 | 2,267 | |
| October 18 | 4:00 p.m. | St. Francis (PA) | Kenneth P. LaValle Stadium; Stony Brook, NY | W 49–14 | 6,079 | |
| October 25 | 1:00 p.m. | at Albany | University Field; Albany, NY (rivalry) | L 7–40 | 5,340 | |
| November 1 | 12:30 p.m. | at Sacred Heart | Campus Field; Fairfield, CT | W 47–16 | 3,138 | |
| November 8 | 6:00 p.m. | Central Connecticut State | Kenneth P. LaValle Stadium; Stony Brook, NY | W 36–31 | 3,811 | |
| November 15 | 1:00 p.m. | at Iona* | Mazzella Field; New Rochelle, NY | W 31–20 | 514 | |
*Non-conference game; All times are in Eastern time
