= Paul Gorham =

American football player and coach (1960–2018)

Biographical details
- Born: 1960 or 1961; Portland, Maine, U.S.
- Died: June 9, 2018 (aged 57)

Playing career
- 1980–1983: New Hampshire

Coaching career (HC unless noted)
- 1986–1987: New Hampshire (GA)
- 1988–1993: New Haven (OL)
- 1994–1998: Brown (OL)
- 1999–2001: UMass (OL)
- 2002–2003: UMass (WR)
- 2004–2011: Sacred Heart

Head coaching record
- Overall: 34–51

Paul Gorham (c. 1960/61 – June 9, 2018) was an American college football coach and player. He was the head football coach for Sacred Heart University from 2004 to 2011. He also coached for Brown, New Hampshire, New Haven, and UMass. Gorham died on June 9, 2018, at age 57.

== Head coaching record ==
Year	Team	Overall	Conference	Standing	Bowl/playoffs
Sacred Heart Pioneers (Northeast Conference) (2004–2011)
2004	Sacred Heart	6–4	4–4	T–5th	
2005	Sacred Heart	4–6	3–4	T–5th	
2006	Sacred Heart	2–9	1–7	7th	
2007	Sacred Heart	3–8	0–6	7th	
2008	Sacred Heart	8–3	4–3	T–3rd	
2009	Sacred Heart	2–8	2–6	T–7th	
2010	Sacred Heart	4–7	2–6	8th	
2011	Sacred Heart	5–6	3–5	T–5th	
Sacred Heart:		34–51	19–41		
Total:		34–51			
