= 1999 Stony Brook Seawolves football team =

American college football season

1999 Stony Brook Seawolves football
- Conference: Northeast Conference
- Record: 5–5 (4–3 NEC)
- Head coach: Sam Kornhauser (16th season)
- Offensive coordinator: Kevin Morris (1st season)
- Home stadium: Seawolves Field

1999 Northeast Conference football standings
	Conf.			Overall
Team	W		L	W		L
Robert Morris $	7	–	0	8	–	2
Albany	6	–	1	7	–	2
Wagner	5	–	2	5	–	5
Stony Brook	4	–	3	5	–	5
Central Connecticut State	3	–	4	4	–	6
Monmouth	2	–	5	2	–	8
Saint Francis (PA)	1	–	6	2	–	9
Sacred Heart	0	–	7	2	–	9
$ – Conference champion

The 1999 Stony Brook Seawolves football team represented Stony Brook University as a member of the Northeast Conference (NEC) during the 1999 NCAA Division I-AA football season. Led by 16th-year head coach Sam Kornhauser, the Seawolves compiled an overall record of 5–5 with a mark of 4–3 in conference place, placing fourth in the NEC. Stony Brook played home games at Seawolves Field in Stony Brook, New York.

== Schedule ==
Date	Opponent	Site	Result	Attendance
September 11	Wagner	Seawolves Field; Stony Brook, NY	L 12–24	
September 25	Monmouth	Seawolves Field; Stony Brook, NY	W 7–3	
October 2	Albany	Seawolves Field; Stony Brook, NY (rivalry)	L 21–44	
October 9	at Sacred Heart	Campus Field; Fairfield, CT	W 48–21	
October 23	at C. W. Post*	Brookville, NY	L 20–44	
October 30	Central Connecticut State	Seawolves Field; Stony Brook, NY	W 27–14	
November 6	at San Diego*	Torero Stadium; San Diego, CA	L 9–20	
November 13	at St. Francis (PA)	Pine Bowl; Loretto, PA	W 24–6	
November 20	at Robert Morris	Moon Stadium; Moon Township, PA	L 19–50	2,572
November 26	at St. John's	DaSilva Memorial Field; Jamaica, NY	W 28–6	
*Non-conference game
