= 1999 Robert Morris Colonials football team =

American college football season

1999 Robert Morris Colonials football

NEC champion
- Conference: Northeast Conference
- Record: 8–2 (8–0 NEC)
- Head coach: Joe Walton (6th season)
- Defensive coordinator: Dan Radakovich (5th season)
- Home stadium: Moon Stadium

1999 Northeast Conference football standings
| | Conf. | | | Overall |
| Team | W | | L | W | | L |
|---|---|---|---|---|---|---|
| Robert Morris $ | 7 | – | 0 | 8 | – | 2 |
| Albany | 6 | – | 1 | 7 | – | 2 |
| Wagner | 5 | – | 2 | 5 | – | 5 |
| Stony Brook | 4 | – | 3 | 5 | – | 5 |
| Central Connecticut State | 3 | – | 4 | 4 | – | 6 |
| Monmouth | 2 | – | 5 | 2 | – | 8 |
| Saint Francis (PA) | 1 | – | 6 | 2 | – | 9 |
| Sacred Heart | 0 | – | 7 | 2 | – | 9 |
$ – Conference champion

The 1999 Robert Morris Colonials football team represented Robert Morris College, now Robert Morris University, as a member of the Northeast Conference (NEC) during the 1999 NCAA Division I-AA football season. The Colonials were led by 6th-year head coach Joe Walton and played their home games at Moon Stadium on the campus of Moon Area High School. The Colonials finished the 1999 season with their fourth consecutive NEC championship.

== Schedule ==
| Date | Opponent | Site | Result | Attendance |
|---|---|---|---|---|
| September 4 | at Buffalo State* | Coyer Field; Buffalo, NY | L 20–32 | 904 |
| September 11 | Dayton* | Moon Stadium; Moon Township, PA | W 34–7 | 3,959 |
| September 18 | at Valparaiso* | Brown Field; Valparaiso, IN | L 13–17 | 2,009 |
| September 25 | at Central Connecticut State | Willow Brook Park; New Britain, CT | W 27–24 | 875 |
| October 2 | Wagner | Moon Stadium; Moon Township, PA | W 23–21 | 4,126 |
| October 16 | Sacred Heart | Moon Stadium; Moon Township, PA | W 48–0 | 2,231 |
| October 23 | at Monmouth | Kessler Field; West Long Branch, NJ | W 34–16 | 3,266 |
| October 30 | at Albany | University Field; Albany, NY | W 30–20 | 4,824 |
| November 6 | Saint Francis | Moon Stadium; Moon Township, PA | W 49–0 | 5,348 |
| November 20 | Stony Brook | Moon Stadium; Moon Township, PA | W 50–19 | 2,572 |
*Non-conference game
