= List of NCAA Division I FCS football stadiums =

The following is a list of current National Collegiate Athletic Association (NCAA) Division I Football Championship Subdivision (formerly Division I-AA) football stadiums in the United States.

Conference affiliations reflect those for the upcoming 2026 season.

== Current stadiums ==
Image	Stadium	City	State	Team	Conference	Capacity	Record (Note: Largest football crowd. Larger attendance records may exist for other configurations of the stadium.)	Built	Expanded (Note: Year of most recent completed stadium expansion/major upgrade.)
	A. W. Mumford Stadium	Baton Rouge	Louisiana	Southern Jaguars	SWAC	28,500	32,000+	1928	1980, 2009
	Alerus Center	Grand Forks	North Dakota	North Dakota Fighting Hawks	Missouri Valley	12,283		2001	
	Alfond Stadium	Orono	Maine	Maine Black Bears	CAA Football	10,000	10,443 (October 15, 2016 vs. Albany)	1947	1998
	Alumni Memorial Field	Lexington	Virginia	VMI Keydets	Southern	10,000		1962	2006
	Alumni Stadium	Dover	Delaware	Delaware State Hornets	MEAC	7,000		1980	
	Anthony Field at Wildcat Stadium	Abilene	Texas	Abilene Christian Wildcats	UAC	12,000		2017	
	Armstrong Stadium	Hampton	Virginia	Hampton Pirates	CAA Football	12,000		1928	1999
	Arthur J. Rooney Athletic Field	Pittsburgh	Pennsylvania	Duquesne Dukes	NEC	2,200		1993	2011
	Arute Field	New Britain	Connecticut	Central Connecticut Blue Devils	NEC	5,500		1969	
	ASU Stadium	Montgomery	Alabama	Alabama State Hornets	SWAC	26,500		2012	N/A
	Bailey Memorial Stadium	Clinton	South Carolina	Presbyterian Blue Hose	Pioneer	6,500		2002	
	Barker–Lane Stadium	Buies Creek	North Carolina	Campbell Fighting Camels	CAA Football	5,000		2008	
	Beirne Stadium	Smithfield	Rhode Island	Bryant Bulldogs	CAA Football	4,400		1999	
	Bethpage Federal Credit Union Stadium	Brookville	New York	LIU Sharks (Note: After the 2018–19 school year, Long Island University unified the athletic programs of its two campuses. The Division I non-football LIU Brooklyn Blackbirds and Division II football-sponsoring LIU Post Pioneers became a single D-I program under the LIU name. The Post football program was included in the merger and represents the whole of LIU from 2019 onward.)	NEC	6,000		2014	2019
	Bob Ford Field at Tom & Mary Casey Stadium	Albany	New York	Albany Great Danes	CAA Football	8,500		2013	N/A
	Bobby Wallace Field at Bank Independent Stadium	Florence	Alabama	North Alabama Lions	UAC	10,000		2026	
	Bobcat Stadium	Bozeman	Montana	Montana State Bobcats	Big Sky	20,767		1973	2011
	Bragg Memorial Stadium	Tallahassee	Florida	Florida A&M Rattlers	SWAC	19,633	33,954	1957	
	Brown Field	Valparaiso	Indiana	Valparaiso Beacons	Pioneer	5,000		1919	
	Brown Stadium	Providence	Rhode Island	Brown Bears	Ivy	20,000		1925	
	Buccaneer Field	North Charleston	South Carolina	Charleston Southern Buccaneers	Ohio Valley	4,000	8,451 (December 5, 2015 vs. Citadel)	1970	
	Bud and Jackie Sellick Bowl	Indianapolis	Indiana	Butler Bulldogs	Pioneer	5,500		1928	2010
	Campus Field	Fairfield	Connecticut	Sacred Heart Pioneers	CAA Football	4,000		1993	
	Casem-Spinks Stadium	Lorman (Note: The Alcorn State campus, including the stadium, has a Lorman mailing address, but is located in unincorporated Claiborne County and designated by the US Census Bureau as "Alcorn State, Mississippi".)	Mississippi	Alcorn State Braves	SWAC	22,500	26,500 (October 22, 1994 vs. Southern)	1992	
	Christy Mathewson–Memorial Stadium	Lewisburg	Pennsylvania	Bucknell Bison	Patriot	13,100		1924	1989
	Coffey Field	Bronx	New York	Fordham Rams	Patriot	7,000		1930	
	Cooper Field	Washington	District of Columbia	Georgetown Hoyas	Patriot	3,750		2005	(Note: Construction halted 2005; stadium completed 2020.)
	Crown Field at Andy Kerr Stadium	Hamilton	New York	Colgate Raiders	Patriot	10,221		1966	1991
	DakotaDome	Vermillion	South Dakota	South Dakota Coyotes	Missouri Valley	10,000		1979	2007
	Dana J. Dykhouse Stadium	Brookings	South Dakota	South Dakota State Jackrabbits	Missouri Valley	19,340	19,371 (October 26, 2019 vs. North Dakota State)	2016	
	Daytona Stadium	Daytona Beach	Florida	Bethune–Cookman Wildcats	SWAC	10,000		1979	
	Drake Stadium	Des Moines	Iowa	Drake Bulldogs	Pioneer	14,557		1925	2005
	Duane Stadium	North Andover	Massachusetts	Merrimack Warriors	Independent	3,500		2017	
	E. Claiborne Robins Stadium	Richmond	Virginia	Richmond Spiders	Patriot	8,400		2010	
	E. J. Whitmire Stadium	Cullowhee	North Carolina	Western Carolina Catamounts	Southern	13,742	15,247 (November 12, 1994 vs. Appalachian State)	1974	
	Eccles Coliseum	Cedar City	Utah	Southern Utah Thunderbirds	Big Sky	8,500		1967	1997
	Eddie G. Robinson Memorial Stadium	Grambling	Louisiana	Grambling State Tigers	SWAC	19,600		1983	
	Ernest Hawkins Field at Memorial Stadium	Commerce	Texas	East Texas A&M Lions	Southland	11,582		1950	2012
	Ernest W. Spangler Stadium	Boiling Springs	North Carolina	Gardner–Webb Runnin' Bulldogs	Ohio Valley	8,500		1969	
	Estes Stadium	Conway	Arkansas	Central Arkansas Bears	UAC	10,000	12,755 (September 1, 2011 vs. Henderson State)	1939	2012
FinleyStadium	Finley Stadium	Chattanooga	Tennessee	Chattanooga Mocs	Southern	20,668		1997	
	Fisher Stadium	Easton	Pennsylvania	Lafayette Leopards	Patriot	13,132		1926	
	Fitton Field	Worcester	Massachusetts	Holy Cross Crusaders	Patriot	23,500	27,000	1924	1986
	Fortera Stadium	Clarksville	Tennessee	Austin Peay Governors	UAC	10,000		1946	2014
	Franklin Field	Philadelphia	Pennsylvania	Penn Quakers	Ivy	52,593		1895	
	Gayle and Tom Benson Stadium	San Antonio	Texas	Incarnate Word Cardinals	Southland	6,000	6,498 (November 17, 2016 vs. Houston Baptist)	2008	2010
	Gibbs Stadium	Spartanburg	South Carolina	Wofford Terriers	Southern	13,000		1996	
	Goodman Stadium	Bethlehem	Pennsylvania	Lehigh Mountain Hawks	Patriot	16,000		1988	
	Greater Zion Stadium	St. George	Utah	Utah Tech Trailblazers	Big Sky	10,500	8,280 (vs. Weber State, 2021)	1985	2017, 2022
	Hancock Stadium	Normal	Illinois	Illinois State Redbirds	Missouri Valley	13,391		1963	
	Hanson Field	Macomb	Illinois	Western Illinois Leathernecks	Ohio Valley	16,368	19,850 (October 20, 1973 vs. Central Michigan)	1950	2007
	Hardy M. Graham Stadium	Martin	Tennessee	UT Martin Skyhawks	Ohio Valley	7,500		1964	
	Harlen C. Hunter Stadium	St. Charles	Missouri	Lindenwood Lions	Ohio Valley	6,000		1976	
	Harry Turpin Stadium	Natchitoches	Louisiana	Northwestern State Demons	Southland	15,971	17,528 (September 2, 2000 vs. Southern)	1976	
	Harvard Stadium	Boston (Note: Although Harvard's overall administration and undergraduate campus are in Cambridge, the football stadium is within the Boston city limits and has a Boston mailing address.)	Massachusetts	Harvard Crimson	Ivy	25,884		1903	2007
	Hillsboro Stadium	Hillsboro	Oregon	Portland State Vikings	Big Sky	7,600		1999	2000
	Homer Bryce Stadium	Nacogdoches	Texas	Stephen F. Austin Lumberjacks	Southland	14,575	23,617 (October 28, 1995 vs. McNeese State)	1973	2003
	Houck Stadium	Cape Girardeau	Missouri	Southeast Missouri Redhawks	Ohio Valley	11,015		1930	1963, 2023
	Hughes Stadium	Baltimore	Maryland	Morgan State Bears	MEAC	10,000		1949	
	Husky Stadium	Houston	Texas	Houston Christian Huskies	Southland	5,000	4,125 (September 10, 2016 vs. Texas Southern)	2014	N/A
	ICCU Dome	Pocatello	Idaho	Idaho State Bengals	Big Sky	12,000		1970	
	Joe Walton Stadium	Moon Township	Pennsylvania	Robert Morris Colonials	NEC	3,000		2005	
	Johnny Unitas Stadium	Towson	Maryland	Towson Tigers	CAA Football	11,198		1978	2002
	Johnson Hagood Stadium	Charleston	South Carolina	The Citadel Bulldogs	Southern	13,800	23,025 (October 17, 1992 vs. Marshall)	1948	2008
	Kenneth P. LaValle Stadium	Stony Brook	New York	Stony Brook Seawolves	CAA Football	12,300		2002	
	Kessler Field	West Long Branch	New Jersey	Monmouth Hawks	CAA Football	4,000	6,233 (1993 vs. Hartwick)	1993	
	Louis Crews Stadium	Normal (Note: Mailing address is Huntsville.)	Alabama	Alabama A&M Bulldogs	SWAC	21,000		1996	
	Manning Field at John L. Guidry Stadium	Thibodaux	Louisiana	Nicholls Colonels	Southland	10,500	14,125 (October 10, 1981 vs. Southern)	1972	2012
	Meade Stadium (Note: Due to extensive ongoing construction at Meade Stadium, Rhode Island is playing its 2026 home games at Centreville Bank Stadium in Pawtucket, Rhode Island.)	Kingston	Rhode Island	Rhode Island Rams	CAA Football	5,180		1928	2003
	Memorial Field	Hanover	New Hampshire	Dartmouth Big Green	Ivy	11,000		1923	
	Memorial Stadium	Terre Haute	Indiana	Indiana State Sycamores	Missouri Valley	12,464		1924	
	Memorial Stadium	Stephenville	Texas	Tarleton State Texans	UAC	24,000		1951	2018
	Mississippi Veterans Memorial Stadium	Jackson	Mississippi	Jackson State Tigers	SWAC	60,492		1941	
	Mustang Memorial Field	San Luis Obispo	California	Cal Poly Mustangs	Big Sky	11,075		2006	
	Five Star Stadium at the Moye Complex	Macon	Georgia	Mercer Bears	Southern	10,200		2013	N/A
	Navarre Stadium	Lake Charles	Louisiana	McNeese Cowboys	Southland	17,410	27,500 (1976 vs. Louisiana-Lafayette)	1965	1998
	Nissan Stadium	Nashville	Tennessee	Tennessee State Tigers	Ohio Valley	68,798		1999	
	Nottingham Field	Greeley	Colorado	Northern Colorado Bears	Big Sky	8,533		1995	
	O’Brien Field	Charleston	Illinois	Eastern Illinois Panthers	Ohio Valley	10,000	12,600 (November 9, 1980 vs. Northern Iowa)	1970	1999
	O'Kelly–Riddick Stadium	Durham	North Carolina	North Carolina Central Eagles	MEAC	10,000		1975	
	Oliver C. Dawson Stadium	Orangeburg	South Carolina	South Carolina State Bulldogs	MEAC	22,000	25,477	1955	
	O'Shaughnessy Stadium	Saint Paul	Minnesota	St. Thomas Tommies	Pioneer	5,000		1947	
	P1FCU Kibbie Dome	Moscow	Idaho	Idaho Vandals	Big Sky	16,000	17,600 (November 18, 1989 vs. Boise State)	1975	N/A
	Paladin Stadium	Greenville	South Carolina	Furman Paladins	Southern	16,000	19,058 (October 10, 1981 vs. Appalachian State)	1981	1985
	Panther Stadium	Prairie View	Texas	Prairie View A&M Panthers	SWAC	15,000		2016	
	PenAir Field (Note: Darrell Gooden Stadium is currently being built around PenAir Field, and is slated to complete in 2027.)	Pensacola	Florida	West Florida Argonauts	UAC	4,000 (Note: Expanding to 10,000 in 2027.)		2016	2027
	Pete Hanna Stadium	Homewood	Alabama	Samford Bulldogs	Southern	6,700	11,189 (1994 vs. Alcorn State)	1958	
	Phil Simms Stadium	Morehead	Kentucky	Morehead State Eagles	Pioneer	10,000		1964	
	Powers Field at Princeton Stadium	Princeton	New Jersey	Princeton Tigers	Ivy	27,800		1998	
	Provost Umphrey Stadium	Beaumont	Texas	Lamar Cardinals	Southland	16,000	18,500 (September 13, 1980 vs. Baylor)	1964	2009–2010
	Ralph F. DellaCamera Stadium	West Haven	Connecticut	New Haven Chargers	NEC	5,000		2009	
	Rhodes Stadium	Elon	North Carolina	Elon Phoenix	CAA Football	11,250	14,167 (November 14, 2009 vs. Appalachian State)	2001	
	Rice–Totten Stadium	Itta Bena (Note: The MVSU campus, including the stadium, has an Itta Bena mailing address, but is located in unincorporated Leflore County and designated by the US Census Bureau as "Mississippi Valley State, Mississippi".)	Mississippi	Mississippi Valley State Delta Devils	SWAC	10,000		1958	
	Richardson Stadium	Davidson	North Carolina	Davidson Wildcats	Pioneer	6,000		1923	1998
	Robert and Janet Vackar Stadium	Edinburg	Texas	UTRGV Vaqueros	Southland	12,000		2015	2025
	Robert K. Kraft Field at Lawrence A. Wien Stadium	New York	New York	Columbia Lions	Ivy	17,000		1984	
	Roos Field	Cheney	Washington	Eastern Washington Eagles	Big Sky	8,600		1967	
	Roy Kidd Stadium	Richmond	Kentucky	Eastern Kentucky Colonels	UAC	20,000		1969	
	Roy Stewart Stadium	Murray	Kentucky	Murray State Racers	Missouri Valley	16,800		1973	
	Saluki Stadium	Carbondale	Illinois	Southern Illinois Salukis	Missouri Valley	15,276		2010	
	Saxon Stadium	Erie	Pennsylvania	Mercyhurst Lakers	NEC	2,300		1996	2019
	Schoellkopf Field	Ithaca	New York	Cornell Big Red	Ivy	21,500		1915	2006
	SeatGeek Stadium	Bridgeview	Illinois	Chicago State Cougars	Independent (NEC in 2027)	20,000		2006	
	Shell Energy Stadium	Houston	Texas	Texas Southern Tigers	SWAC	20,656		2012	
	Simmons Bank Field	Pine Bluff	Arkansas	Arkansas–Pine Bluff Golden Lions	SWAC	16,000		2000	
	Spec Martin Municipal Stadium	DeLand	Florida	Stetson Hatters	Pioneer	6,000		1941	
	Stambaugh Stadium	Youngstown	Ohio	Youngstown State Penguins	Missouri Valley	20,650	21,119 (October 14, 2000 vs. Northern Iowa)	1982	
	Stewart Stadium	Ogden	Utah	Weber State Wildcats	Big Sky	17,000		1966	
	Strawberry Stadium	Hammond	Louisiana	Southeastern Louisiana Lions	Southland	7,408	12,000 (October 3, 1980 vs. Jackson State)	1936	2008
	Tenney Stadium at Leonidoff Field	Poughkeepsie	New York	Marist Red Foxes	Pioneer	5,000		1968	2007
	Torero Stadium	San Diego	California	San Diego Toreros	Pioneer	6,000		1961	
	Truist Stadium	Greensboro	North Carolina	North Carolina A&T Aggies	CAA Football	21,500	34,769	1981	
	Tucker Stadium	Cookeville	Tennessee	Tennessee Tech Golden Eagles	Southern	16,500		1966	
	UC Davis Health Stadium	Davis	California	UC Davis Aggies	Big Sky	10,849		2007	
	UNI-Dome	Cedar Falls	Iowa	Northern Iowa Panthers	Missouri Valley	16,000		1976	1998
	University Stadium	Carrollton	Georgia	West Georgia Wolves	UAC	10,000		2009	
	Villanova Stadium	Villanova	Pennsylvania	Villanova Wildcats	Patriot	12,500		1927	
	Wagner College Stadium	Staten Island	New York	Wagner Seahawks	NEC	3,300		1967	
	Walkup Skydome	Flagstaff	Arizona	Northern Arizona Lumberjacks	Big Sky	15,300		1977	
	W.B. Mason Stadium	Easton	Massachusetts	Stonehill Skyhawks	NEC	2,400		2005	
	Washington–Grizzly Stadium	Missoula	Montana	Montana Grizzlies	Big Sky	25,200	26,856	1986	1995, 2003, 2008
	Welcome Stadium	Dayton	Ohio	Dayton Flyers	Pioneer	11,000		1949	1974
	Wildcat Stadium	Durham	New Hampshire	New Hampshire Wildcats	CAA Football	11,015		1936	2016
	William "Dick" Price Stadium	Norfolk	Virginia	Norfolk State Spartans	MEAC	30,000	33,872	1997	
	William B. Greene Jr. Stadium	Johnson City	Tennessee	East Tennessee State Buccaneers	Southern	7,694	12,109 (November 9, 2024 vs. Western Carolina)	2017	
	William H. Greene Stadium	Washington, D.C.	District of Columbia	Howard Bison	MEAC	10,000		1986	
	Yale Bowl	New Haven	Connecticut	Yale Bulldogs	Ivy	61,446		1914	
	Zable Stadium	Williamsburg	Virginia	William & Mary Tribe	Patriot	12,259	18,054 (November 16, 1985 vs. Richmond)	1935	2016

Notes

There are 6 domes, all of which have installed FieldTurf.

== Future stadiums ==
This list includes the following:

- Stadiums of current FCS teams that are either under construction or confirmed to be built in the future.
- Stadiums that will be used by teams confirmed to be either adding or upgrading/downgrading to FCS football in the future. This includes existing venues as well as those under construction or confirmed to be built.

Stadium	City	State	Team	Conference	Capacity	Record (Note: Largest football crowd. Larger attendance records may exist for other configurations of the stadium.)	Built (Note: Year originally opened.)	Expanded (Note: Year of most recently completed stadium expansion/major upgrade.)
New Nissan Stadium	Nashville	Tennessee	Tennessee State Tigers	Ohio Valley	60,000		2027	

== See also ==
- List of NCAA Division I FCS football programs
- List of NCAA Division I FBS football stadiums
- List of American football stadiums by capacity
- Lists of stadiums
