= Meade Stadium =

Stadium in Rhode Island, USA

Coordinates: 41.488006°N 71.534643°W

John E. "Jack" Meade Stadium
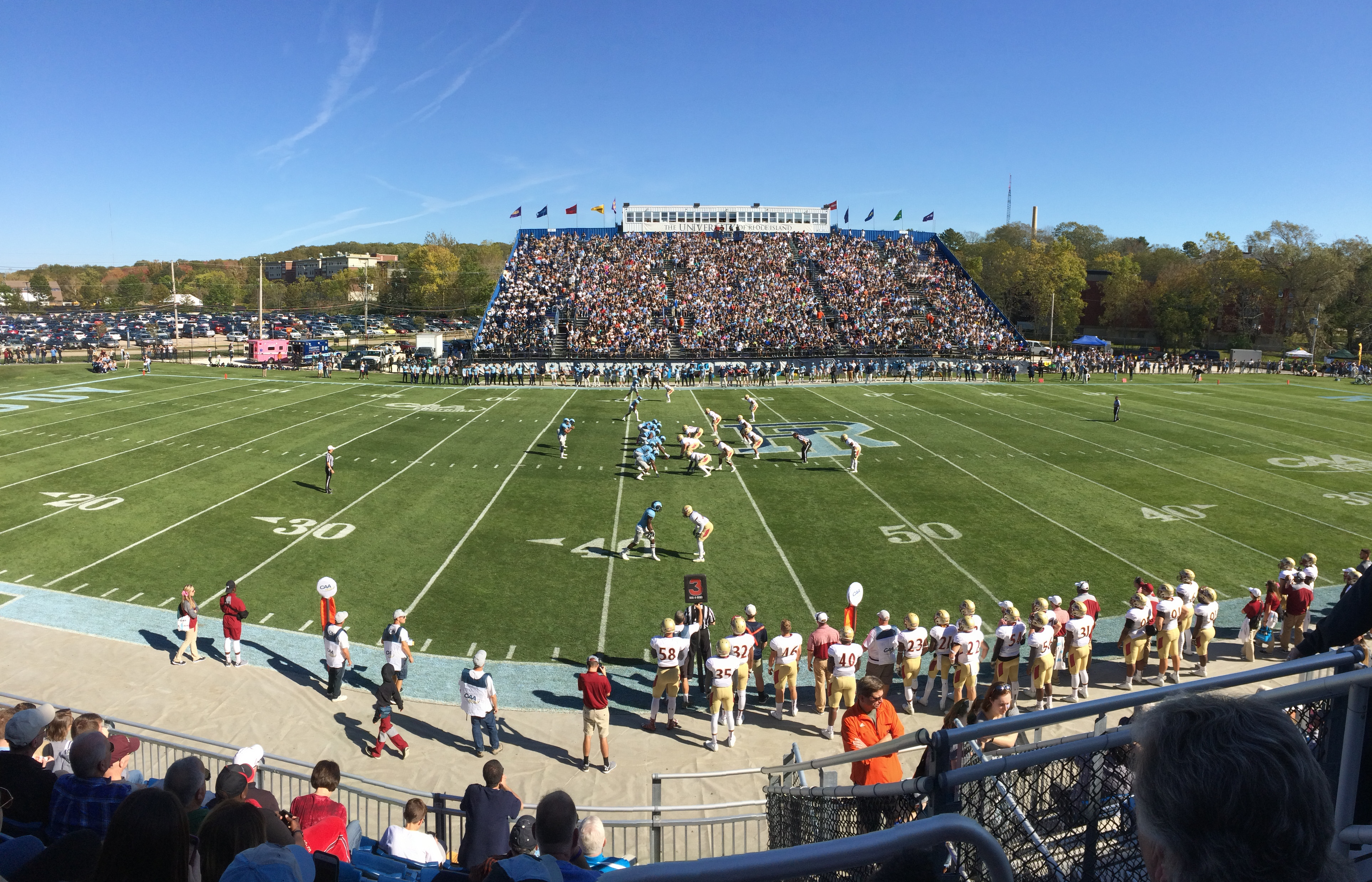
- Interactive map of John E. "Jack" Meade Stadium
- Former names: Meade Field (1928–1978)
- Location: Keaney Ave; Kingston, RI 02881
- Owner: University of Rhode Island
- Operator: University of Rhode Island
- Capacity: 2,500 (1928–1932); 4,000 (1933–1948); 4,500 (1949–1951); 6,000 (1952–1960); 8,500 (1961–1964); 10,000 (1965–1993); 8,000 (1994–1999); 6,470 (2000–2002); 5,180 (2003–2008); 6,555 (2009–present)
- Surface: Grass (1928–2018); FieldTurf (2019–present)

Construction
- Groundbreaking: 1928; 98 years ago
- Opened: September 22, 1928; 97 years ago

Tenant
- Rhode Island Rams football

Meade Stadium is a 6,555-seat multi-purpose stadium in Kingston, Rhode Island. It is home to the University of Rhode Island's Rams football team. The facility opened in 1928 and was originally named Meade Field, in honor of John E. "Jack" Meade, an alumnus and local politician, said to have attended every home football and basketball game until his death in 1972. The facility adopted its current name in 1978, when an aluminum and steel grandstand was added.

The stadium has undergone many changes in its history. The old field house was built in 1933, and in 1934, the west stands and press box were opened, with a capacity of 1,500. In 1978, the 50-row steel grandstand was erected on the east side, bringing the total capacity up to 8,000. Various other projects, including a press box expansion and modernization of the turf and scoreboard, took place soon after. In 2000, the west stands and field house were razed to make way for the Ryan Center. During the 2006 football season, a new set of west stands opened abutting the Ryan Center, whose east luxury boxes also look down on Meade Stadium. In the spring and summer of 2019, the university undertook a $4.1 million project that brought lights and field turf to Meade Stadium.

== Attendance ==
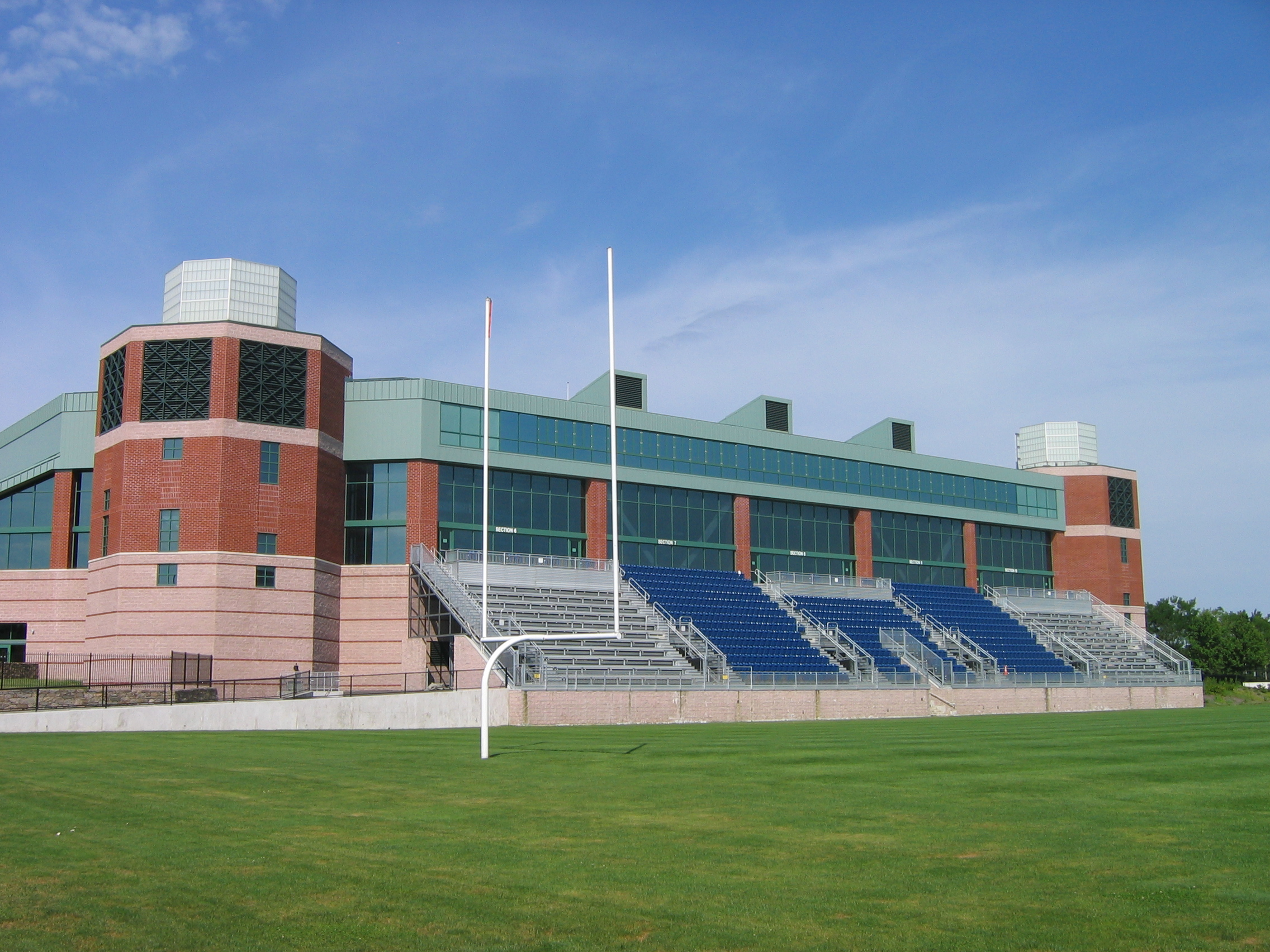
2008, Visitor Stands built into side of Ryan Center.

Highest attendance at Meade Stadium
Rank	Attendance	Date	Opponent	Special note	Result
1	13,052	October 20, 1984	#14 Boston University	URI ranked #11, Homecoming	W 22–7
2	12,933	October 26, 1985	Lafayette	Homecoming	W 41–19
3	12,211	October 8, 1983	Northeastern	Homecoming	W 30–10
4	12,092	November 17, 1973	Connecticut		T 7–7
5	12,000	October 17, 1970	Massachusetts	Homecoming	W 14–7
6	11,700	October 8, 1966	Vermont	Homecoming	L 7–21
7	11,231	October 31, 1987	#6 New Hampshire	Homecoming	L 14–28
8	11,000	October 7, 1967	New Hampshire	Homecoming	W 13–6
9	11,000	October 4, 1969	Maine	Homecoming	L 7–35
10	10,446	December 1, 1984	#12 Richmond	URI ranked #2, 1-AA Quarterfinal	W 17–23
11	10,443	October 4, 1980	#8 Massachusetts	Homecoming	L 8–26
12	10,230	October 16, 1982	Boston University	Homecoming	L 16–26
13	10,228	October 20, 1990	Boston University	Homecoming	L 13–15
14	10,227	October 6, 1984	Massachusetts	URI ranked #16	W 20–19
15	10,145	October 19, 1991	Maine	Homecoming	W 52–30
16	10,114	November 2, 1985	#14 New Hampshire	URI ranked #17	W 30–20
17	10,000	October 10, 1964	Vermont	Homecoming	L 8–16
18	10,000	October 23, 1965	Maine	Homecoming	L 0–36
19	10,000	October 12, 1968	Vermont	Homecoming	W 52–10
20	10,000	October 2, 1971	Maine	Homecoming	L 7–21
21	9,882	October 18, 1986	Boston University	Homecoming	L 0–17
22	9,842	October 10, 1981	Northeastern	Homecoming	W 33–0
23	9,841	October 22, 1983	Southern Connecticut		W 17–7
24	9,737	November 7, 1981	Brown	URI ranked #10	L 8–10
25	9,624	October 31, 1981	#2 New Hampshire		W 14–12

== See also ==
- List of NCAA Division I FCS football stadiums
