= Joe Walton Stadium =

3000-seat multi-purpose stadium in Pennsylvania, United States

Coordinates: 40.5211886°N 80.2162671°W

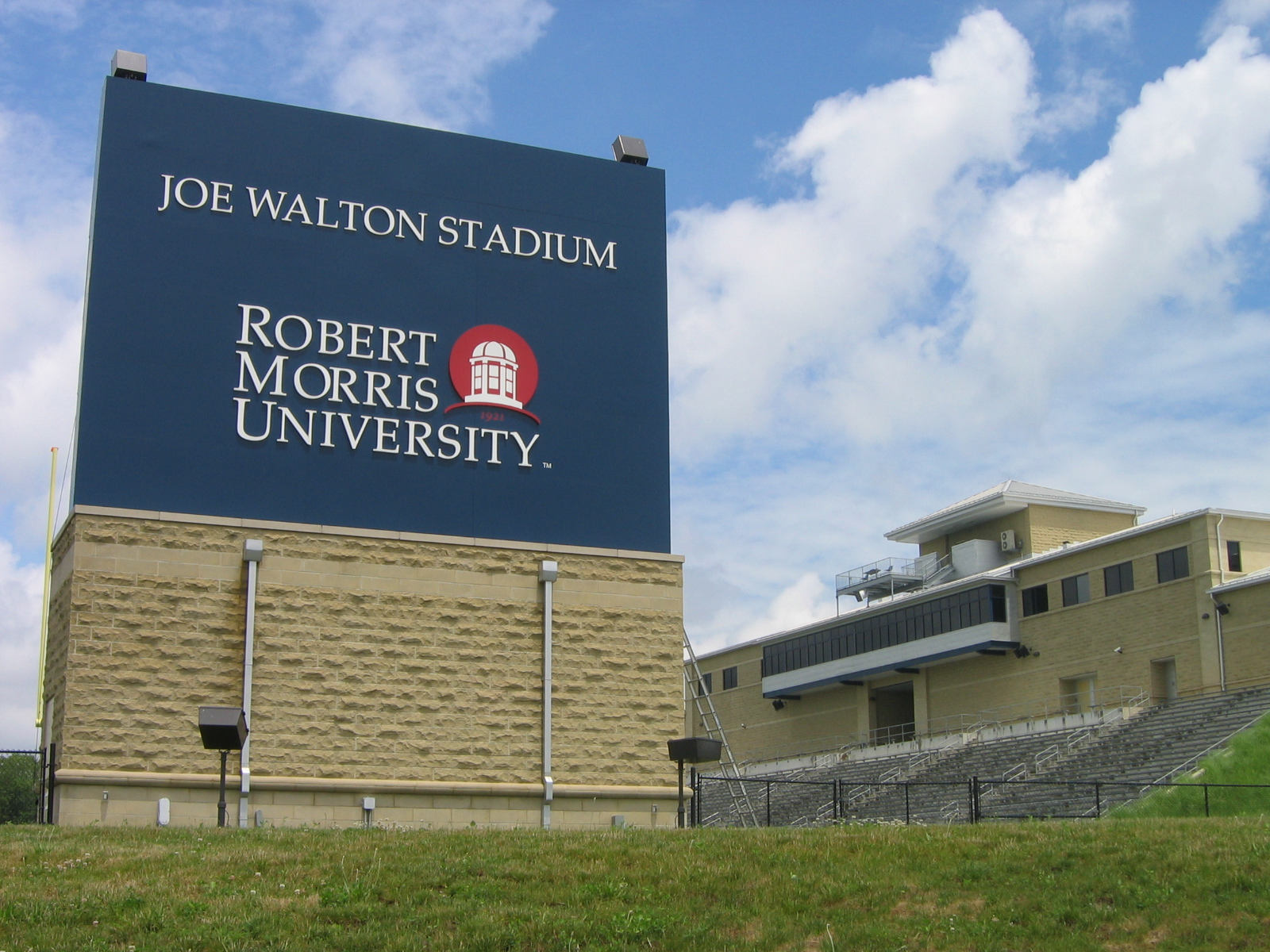
- Interactive map of Joe Walton Stadium
- Location: 230 Colonial Way; Moon Township, PA 15108
- Owner: Robert Morris University
- Operator: Robert Morris University
- Capacity: 3,000
- Surface: FieldTurf

Construction
- Groundbreaking: August 2004
- Opened: September 17, 2005
- Cost: $10 million ($16.5 million in 2025 dollars)
- Architect: JDBA Architects
- General contractor: Mosites Construction Company

Tenant
- Robert Morris Colonials (NCAA) (2005–Present)

Joe Walton Stadium is a 3,000-seat multi-purpose stadium that is located in Moon Township, Pennsylvania. It is home to the Robert Morris University Colonials football team and men's and women's lacrosse team.

== History ==
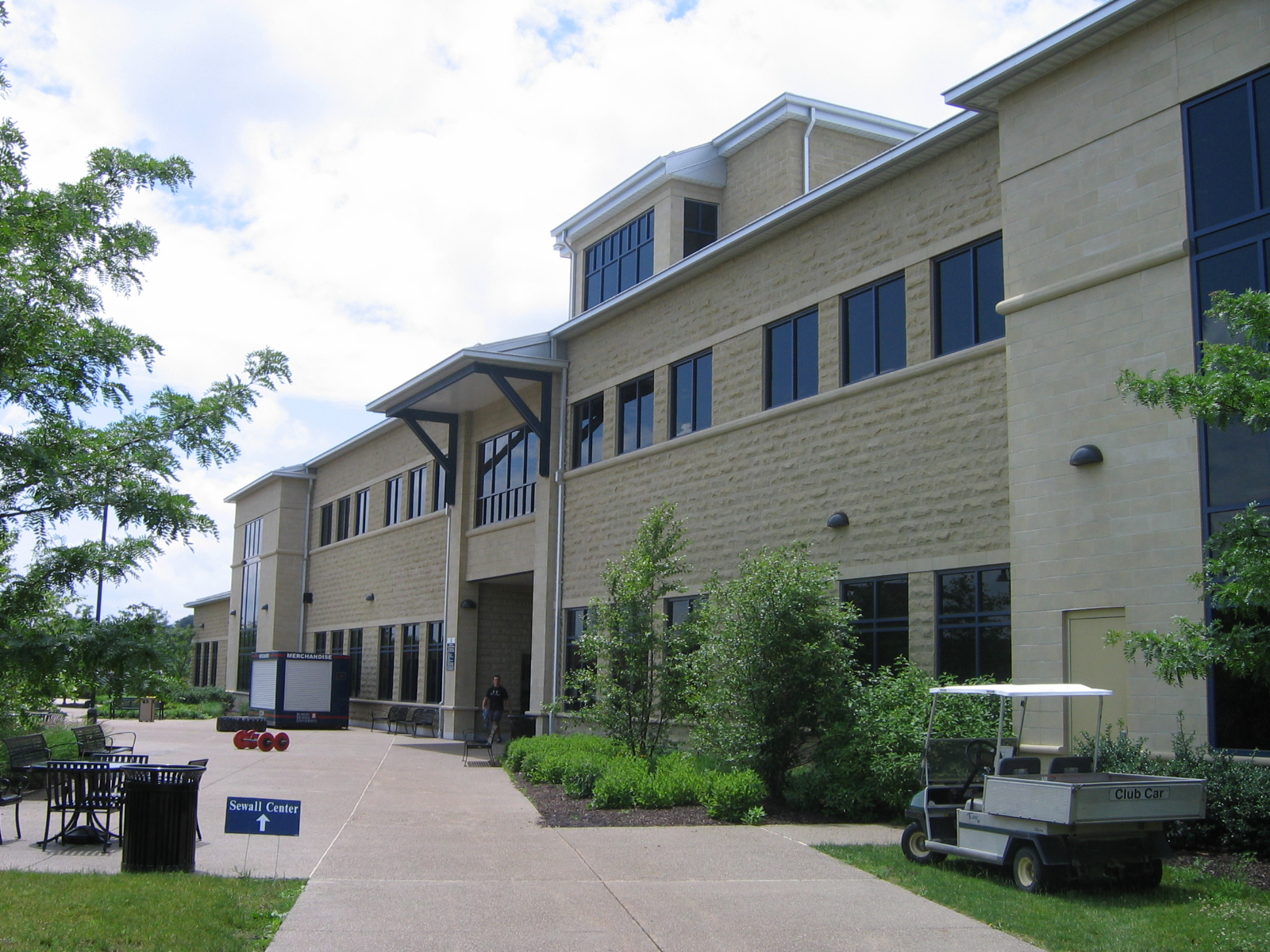
Offices behind pressbox

The facility opened in 2005 and was named for Colonials head football coach Joe Walton. The inaugural football game was played on September 17, 2005 when Robert Morris defeated Butler 49–13. The team formerly played its home games at Moon Area High School's Moon Stadium.

The inaugural men's lacrosse game was played on March 5, 2005 when Robert Morris lost to Drexel 9–4. The inaugural women's lacrosse game was played on March 24, 2005 when Robert Morris lost to Wagner 16–3.

In 2023, the stadium added a new scoreboard as well as a new athletics training room.

== Attendance records ==
Rank	Attendance	Date	Game Result
1	4,384	October 8, 2011	Robert Morris 45, Saint Francis 14
2	3,942	October 11, 2008	Robert Morris 34, Duquesne 27
3	3,784	October 1, 2005	Robert Morris 28, Saint Francis 35
4	3,516	September 17, 2005	Robert Morris 49, Butler 13
5	3,524	September 29, 2012	Robert Morris 31, Lafayette 28
6	3,246	September 9, 2006	Robert Morris 7, Duquesne 27
7	3,078	October 16, 2010	Robert Morris 38, Albany 0
8	3,057	October 14, 2017	Robert Morris 14, Duquesne 51
9	2,895	October 6, 2007	Robert Morris 13, Wagner 20
10	2,893	October 19, 2012	Robert Morris 20, Duquesne 21
10	2,893	September 18, 2010	Robert Morris 30, 14 Liberty 23
12	2,874	October 30, 2010	Robert Morris 38, Duquesne 0
13	2,843	October 14, 2006	Robert Morris 23, 19 Central Connecticut State 17^{2OT}
14	2,809	August 28, 2014	Robert Morris 10, Eastern Kentucky 29
15	2,789	November 6, 2010	Robert Morris 42, Central Connecticut State 24
16	2,634	September 16, 2017	Robert Morris 23, VMI 0
17	2,533	September 14, 2019	Robert Morris 31, Dayton 34
18	2,514	September 25, 2021	Robert Morris 22, Howard 16
19	2,455	September 19, 2009	Robert Morris 14, Dayton 21
20	2,357	September 10, 2016	Robert Morris 7, Alderson Broaddus 14

== See also ==
- List of NCAA Division I FCS football stadiums
