= Arthur J. Rooney Athletic Field =

Sports field

Coordinates: 40°26′8″N 79°59′24″W

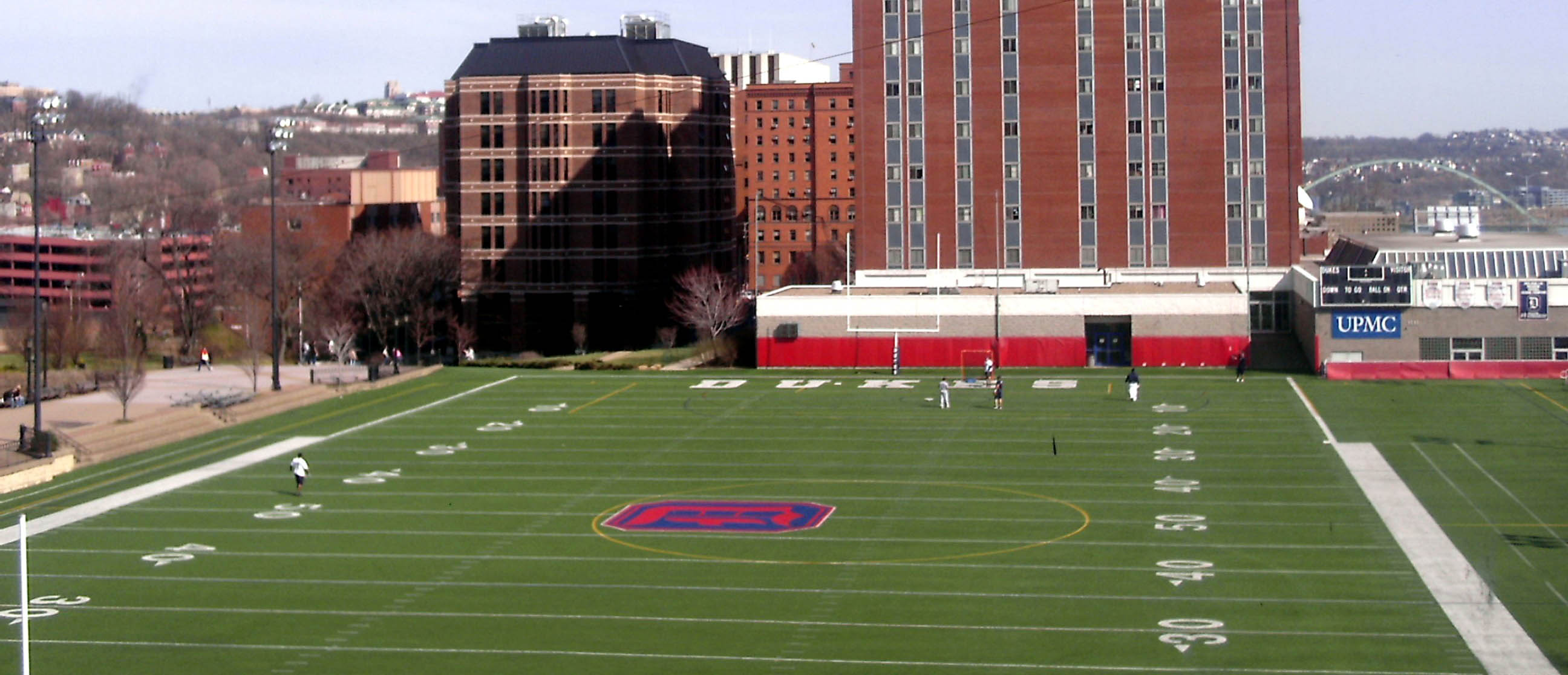
- View of the stadium in 2006

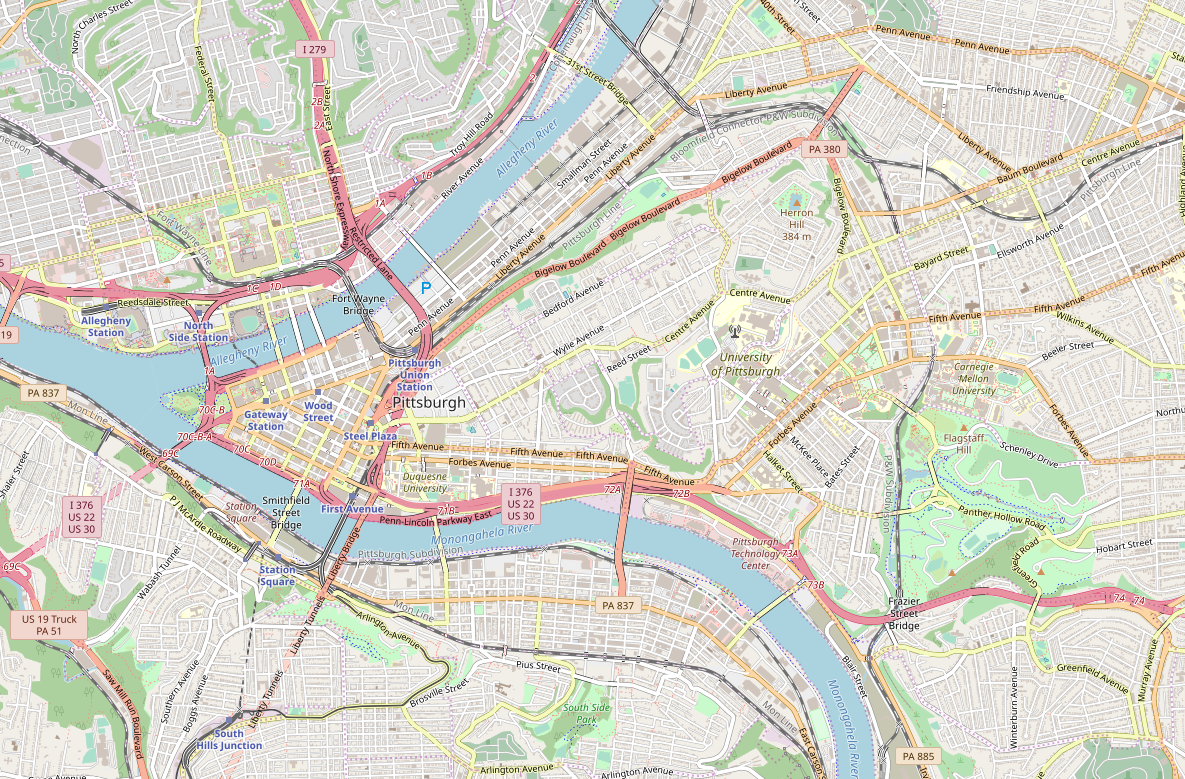
- Location near Downtown Pittsburgh Location in Pennsylvania Location in the United States
- Address: 600 Forbes Avenue; Pittsburgh, PA; United States
- Owner: Duquesne University
- Operator: Duquesne Athletics
- Capacity: 2,200 (2008–present); 4,500 (1993–2007)
- Type: Stadium
- Surface: Astroturf (1993–2007); Sportexe Momentum Turf (2008–present)
- Current use: Football; Soccer; Lacrosse

Construction
- Groundbreaking: June 1993
- Opened: October 23, 1993; 32 years ago
- Cost: $2.5 million ($5.57 million in 2025 dollars)
- Architect: WTW Architects

Tenants
- Duquesne Dukes (NCAA) teams: football, men's and women's soccer, lacrosse; Pittsburgh Thunderbirds (AUDL) (2018)

Website
- goduquesne.com/rooney-field

Arthur J. Rooney Athletic Field, commonly known as simply Rooney Field, is a 2,200-seat (4,500 capacity) multi-purpose facility in Pittsburgh, Pennsylvania. Situated on the campus of Duquesne University, Rooney Field is the home field of the Duquesne Dukes football, soccer and lacrosse teams.

Its location atop the Bluff in the center of Duquesne's campus makes Rooney Field one of the most unusual football facilities in the nation. Bordered by Academic Walk on one side and Mellon Hall of Science and the Duquesne Towers Living and Learning Center on either end, the field offers views of downtown Pittsburgh, the Monongahela River, and Pittsburgh's South Side.

Rooney Field has hosted three televised games. On Monday, October 31, 1994, ESPN2 televised Duquesne's 16–12 win over Iona College to a national audience. In addition, two games in 1995 — the MAAC Championship-deciding game versus St. John's and the ECAC Bowl game vs. Wagner — were aired locally on what was then the e Sports Network.

== Description ==
The 1993 completion of Rooney Field enabled the Dukes to play football on campus for the first time since 1929. A 6-foot (1.8 m) excavation transformed what was once a faculty and staff parking lot into the centerpiece of Duquesne University's urban campus. The space limitations inherent to the university's 49-acre (19.8 ha) plot required that Rooney Field be one of the few in college football that run east to west.

The Beard Press Box, a three-tier structure funded by a contribution from the Eugene Beard family, was completed in the summer of 1995. The field itself is named for Duquesne alumnus and founder of the Pittsburgh Steelers, Art Rooney. Prior to the University of Pittsburgh Medical Center Sportsplex opening in 2000, the field and other university facilities served as either the primary or secondary in-season training facilities for the Steelers since their founding in 1933.

In addition to serving as home for the Duquesne men's and women's soccer and lacrosse teams, numerous other activities are held on Rooney Field, such as camps, team practices, and intramural activities.

With a capacity of only 2,200, Rooney Field is currently the smallest stadium in the NCAA FCS, and Division 1 football as a whole.

== Renovations ==
Bolstered by the first half of a $4 million renovation completed in 2009, the lighted, Sportexe turf-covered facility celebrates its 20th full-season anniversary in 2013.

Part of the recently completed renovation is permanent grandstand seating on Bluff Street, which replaces temporary bleachers that had been installed for 14 football seasons. Permanent concession stands and restrooms have also been added to the south side of the field. The Academic Walk sideline has also gained additional seating. As part of the second stage of the renovation, the field house located at the east end of the field was remodeled and expanded to provide an area for a new football locker room, football coaches' suite, and additional locker room space for the soccer, lacrosse, and swim teams. Field house construction began following the 2008–2009 athletics season and was finished in the summer of 2011. The 2009 renovation reduced the field's capacity from 4,500 to the current 2,200 although plans are being developed for a future renovation that may re-add additional seating. In 2019, the playing surface was replaced with Field Turf.

== See also ==
- List of NCAA Division I FCS football stadiums
