= Arute Field =

Stadium in New Britain, Connecticut, US

Coordinates: 41.6950545°N 72.7616304°W

- Interactive map of Arute Field
- Location: 1615 Stanley Street; New Britain, CT 06050
- Owner: Central Connecticut State University
- Operator: Central Connecticut State University
- Capacity: 5,500 (2012–present); 3,000 (2000–2011)
- Surface: Field Turf

Construction
- Groundbreaking: November 13, 1998
- Opened: November 11, 2000
- Cost: $5 million ($9.35 million in 2025 dollars)
- Architect: Bernard J. Lombardi
- General contractor: LTC Construction

Tenants
- Central Connecticut State Blue Devils (NCAA) (1969–present); Connecticut Constitution (AUDL) (2012)

Arute Field is a 5,500-seat multi-purpose stadium in New Britain, Connecticut, United States. It is home to Central Connecticut State University's Blue Devils football and men's and women's lacrosse teams.

The first incarnation of Arute Field was on land now occupied by the Elihu Burritt Library. The field was moved to its current location in the late 1960s. Jack Arute Sr., the owner of what was then one of the state's largest construction businesses, built the first field to bear his family's name.

The second incarnation of the stadium was built in 1970 and demolished in 1998. The third and current version of the stadium was built on the same site of the second one, and opened in November 2000. Before the 2012 season, 2,500 seats were added to the east side of the stadium as well as a new state-of-the-art video board.

== See also ==
- List of NCAA Division I FCS football stadiums
