= Campus Field =

Multi-purpose stadium in Fairfield, Connecticut

Coordinates: 41°13′9″N 73°14′45″W

- Interactive map of Campus Field
- Location: 5151 Park Avenue; Fairfield, Connecticut 06825
- Owner: Sacred Heart University
- Operator: Sacred Heart University
- Capacity: 10,500 (2014–present); 10,734 (2010–2013); 13,000 (1993–2009)
- Surface: Sprinturf

Construction
- Groundbreaking: 1992
- Opened: September 11, 1993
- Cost: $13 million
- Architects: Sasaki Associates, Inc

Tenant
- Sacred Heart Pioneers (NCAA) (1993–Present)

Campus Field is a 3,334-seat multi-purpose stadium in Fairfield, Connecticut. It is home to the Sacred Heart University Pioneers football, lacrosse, and track and field teams. The facility opened in 1993.

The field and track located at Campus Field were modernized and renovated in the summer of 2008. The field was returfed in 2009 and 2014.

In 2022, the Notre Dame Catholic High School football team played their home games on the field.

== See also ==
- List of NCAA Division I FCS football stadiums
