= Kessler Stadium =

Stadium in West Long Branch, New Jersey

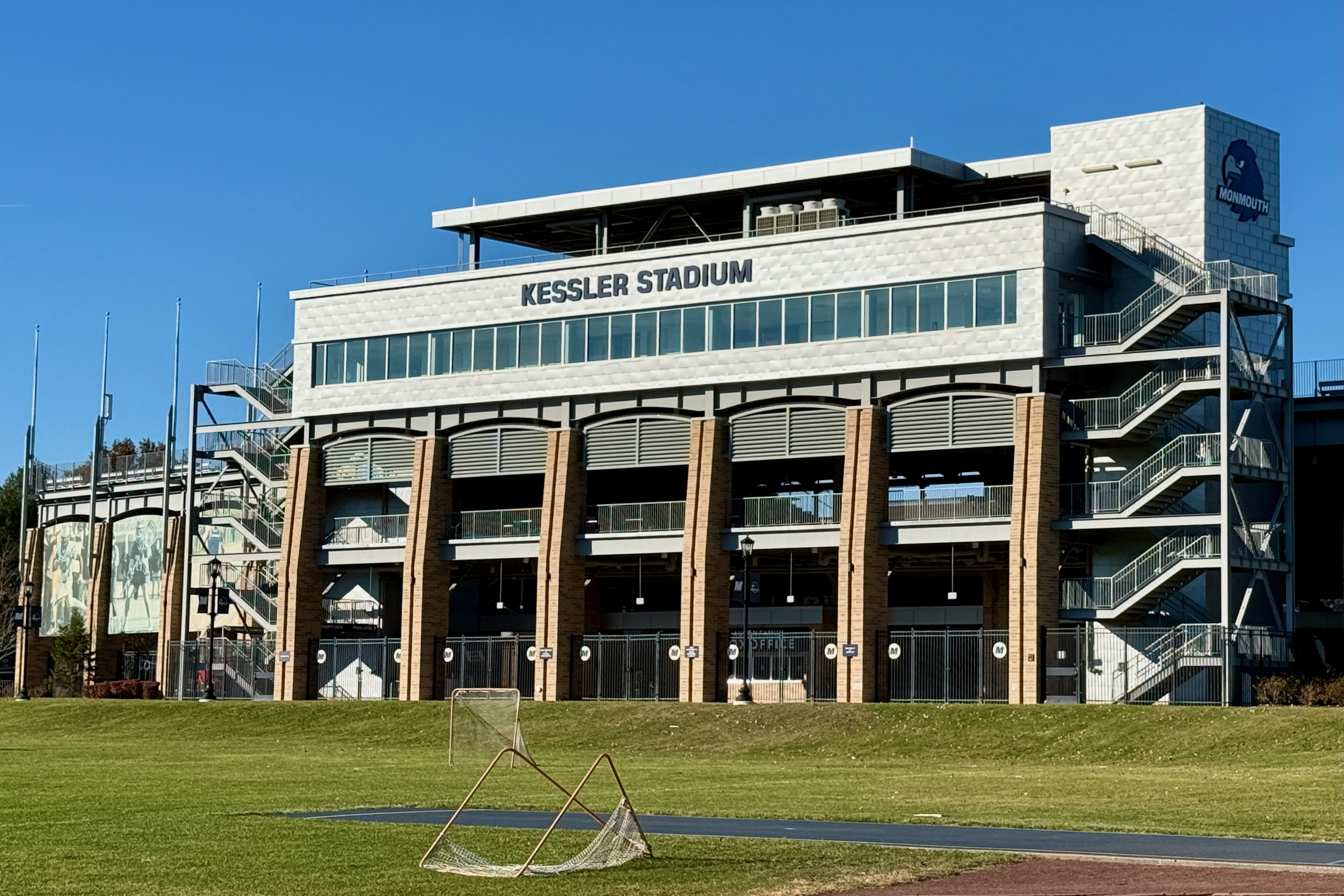
- Interactive map of Kessler Stadium
- Former names: Kessler Field
- Address: 400 Cedar Ave. West Long Branch, NJ; United States
- Coordinates: 40.279313°N 74.009464°W
- Owner: Monmouth University
- Operator: Monmouth University
- Capacity: 4,600 (1993–2013); 3,200 (2014–2016); 4,200 (2017–present)
- Type: Stadium
- Surface: Fieldturf
- Current use: football Track and field

Construction
- Groundbreaking: 1992
- Opened: September 25, 1993; 32 years ago
- Renovated: 2017
- Cost: $16 million

Tenants
- Monmouth University Hawks (NCAA) (1993–present)

Website
- monmouthhawks.com/kessler-stadium

Kessler Stadium is a 4,200-seat football and track stadium in West Long Branch, New Jersey. It was built in 1993 and is home to the Monmouth University Hawks.

Kessler Stadium underwent a renovation prior to the start of the 2017 football season that saw the seating capacity expand to more than 4,200 seats, including 800+ chair backs. A new brick facade complements the design of the OceanFirst Bank Center and the seating stretches end zone to end zone. Kessler Stadium is home to a press box and multimedia center on the third fourth, a main concourse at ground level which is home to the Brockriede Family Concessions and the Austin Family Box Office. On the second floor, the Doherty Family Deck hosts Monmouth Athletics Blue-White Club events.

The first home football game in Monmouth's history was on September 25, 1993, against Sacred Heart University.

== See also ==
- List of NCAA Division I FCS football stadiums
