= Wagner College Stadium =

Stadium in Staten Island, New York

Coordinates: 40.617406°N 74.094822°W

Hameline Field
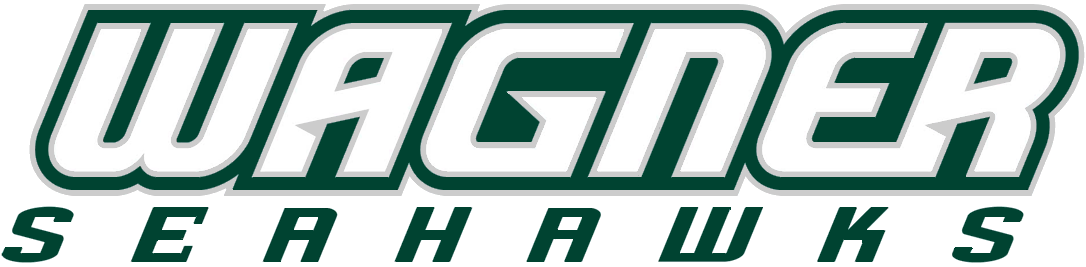
- Interactive map of Hameline Field
- Full name: Hameline Field at Wagner College Stadium
- Former names: Fischer Memorial Stadium; Wagner College Stadium
- Address: One Campus Road; Staten Island, NY; United States
- Owner: Wagner College
- Operator: Wagner College Athletics
- Capacity: 3,700
- Type: Stadium
- Surface: FieldTurf
- Current use: Football; Soccer; Lacrosse

Construction
- Groundbreaking: 1967
- Opened: 1967; 59 years ago
- Renovated: 1998
- Cost: $2.5 million (1997 renovation)

Tenants
- Wagner Seahawks (NCAA) teams: football, women's soccer; men's and women's lacrosse

Website
- wagnerathletics.com/hameline-field

Hameline Field at Wagner College Stadium is a 3,500-seat stadium located on the campus of Wagner College in Staten Island, New York. Opened in 1967, the stadium is used for football, men's lacrosse, women's lacrosse, and track & field.

Hameline Field has 400 premium seat back chairs located at midfield. Below the stadium is a field house featuring several locker rooms, a training room, an equipment room, and public facilities. Surrounding the field is a six-lane synthetic track, allowing the college to play host to many major track & field events. The stadium was renovated as part of a $13 million addition to the campus facilities in 1998. In 2006, the stadium's natural grass field was replaced with state-of-the-art FieldTurf, a synthetic grass playing surface.

In 2012, the playing surface was named "Hameline Field" in honor of long-time athletic director and head football coach Walt Hameline. In 2013, lights were added to the stadium, and the football and women's soccer teams played home night games for the first time.

== See also ==
- List of NCAA Division I FCS football stadiums
