= Albany Great Danes =

Intercollegiate sports teams of University of Albany

- University: University at Albany
- Nickname: Great Danes
- NCAA: Division I (FCS)
- Conference: America East (primary); CAA (football); Metro (women's golf)
- Athletic director: Mark Benson
- Location: Albany, New York
- Varsity teams: 17 (7 Men & 10 Women)
- Football stadium: Bob Ford Field at Tom & Mary Casey Stadium
- Basketball arena: Broadview Center
- Baseball stadium: Varsity Field
- Soccer stadium: Bob Ford Field at Tom & Mary Casey Stadium
- Lacrosse stadium: Bob Ford Field at Tom & Mary Casey Stadium
- Other venues: University Field; University Gymnasium; Alumni Turf Field
- Colors: Purple and gold
- Mascot: Damien
- Fight song: Purple and Gold
- Website: ualbanysports.com

Men's sports	Women's sports
Baseball	Basketball
Basketball	Cross country
Cross country	Field hockey
Football	Golf
Lacrosse	Lacrosse
Soccer	Soccer
Track and field^{1}	Softball
	Track and field^{1}
	Volleyball
	Rowing^{2}
^{1} Track and field includes both indoor and outdoor.^{2} Beginning Fall 2024.

The Albany Great Danes are the NCAA Division I intercollegiate athletic programs of the University at Albany, SUNY, located in Albany, New York, United States. A member of the America East Conference, the University at Albany, SUNY sponsors teams in eight men's and ten women's NCAA sanctioned sports. The football team is a member of the Coastal Athletic Association Football Conference, and the women's golf team is an associate member of the Metro Atlantic Athletic Conference.

== History ==
America East Conference logo in Albany's colors

The university's intercollegiate athletics date back to the late 1890s, but its development was hampered for several decades by inadequate facilities, uncertain financial support, and the relatively small number of male students in an institution designed to develop elementary school teachers. Tennis remained a constant from 1898 onward along with men's basketball from 1909, but attempts to field teams in football (1922), baseball (1896–1901), swimming, and hockey were aborted.

Expansion into men's and women's sports increased after World War II and then expanded greatly in the 1960s (men's sports of lacrosse, track & field, cross-country and swimming moved from club to varsity status, and women's tennis, softball, field hockey, basketball and swimming were introduced), as a direct result of the introduction of the new Uptown Campus and its expanded athletic facilities. A nickname change also occurred in 1965 when the Pedagogues became the Great Danes, making Albany the only American college or university with that mascot. The name Great Danes was selected by university student, Kathy Earle, who won a $25 savings bond for her selection. Mrs. Earle, UAlbany class of '67, selected the Great Danes because of their "Size, weight, strength, character, courage, speed, and stamina".

All athletics are run by the University at Albany Department of Athletics and Recreation. After the 1972 NCAA restructuring, the university competed in Division III until the 1995–96 school year, when it moved to Division II. The university would remain in Division II until 1999. In addition to varsity sports, Albany's intercollegiate club sports include Men's Ice Hockey, Men's & Women's Rugby, Wrestling and Men's Volleyball. However, these teams are not affiliated with the Department of Athletics and Recreation and are instead funded by the Student Association.

=== Football ===
The team competes in the NCAA Division I Football Championship Subdivision (FCS) as a member of the Coastal Athletic Association Football Conference (CAA Football). The 2013 season was the Great Danes' first in the CAA, following a 14-year tenure in the Northeast Conference.

Albany played football as a club sport in the 1920s, but dropped that program in 1924. The modern era of Albany football began in 1970, when the school restored football as a club sport. The team was upgraded to full varsity status in 1973. From the revival of football in 1970 through 2012, the team played its home games at the 10,000-seat University Field in Albany, New York. Albany opened a new 8,500-seat stadium, Bob Ford Field, for the 2013 season. It was renamed Bob Ford Field at Tom & Mary Casey Stadium in 2015 after Tom & Mary Casey gave a $10 million gift to the school. The stadium field is named after Bob Ford, who was the Great Danes' head coach from 1970 through 2013.

During the late 1900s, one of the most well known coaches at the university was Ford. The architect of the University at Albany's football program, Ford was Albany's only head coach from the reinstatement of the program after a 46-year absence until his retirement at the end of the 2013 season. In 1973, in its first year as a varsity program, Albany finished with a 7–2 record. In 1974, the team finished 9–0, the school's only undefeated season. Ford put together a record of 256–169 with the Great Danes. Ford recorded his 250th career win with a 38–10 victory against Duquesne on October 8, 2011.

During his time with Albany, Ford led the Great Danes to one ECAC North Championships (D-III), one Division III Playoff appearance, two East Football Conference Championships and three Northeast Conference Championships (two Co-Championship).

On April 17, 2012, the university broke ground on a new multi-sport complex that was available for use beginning in fall 2013. Along with a complex that will be the new home for football and soccer, a new track will be created on the current football field, University Field. The plans to build the stadium were revealed in summer 2011. The new stadium, with a field to be named Bob Ford Field, would hold initially 6,000. However, the stadium was to be built so future expansion can take place for upwards to 10,000 to 15,000.

==== UAlbany and the NFL ====
The UAlbany football program grew under Ford's leadership, leading to connections between the program and the National Football League. Rudy Vido, who graduated in 1974 as a fullback and defensive end, became the first player in school history to sign a contract with an NFL team. He was cut in the preseason by the New England Patriots, so he never played in the NFL. Vido was also signed by several Canadian Football League teams, but never played in the CFL either.

In 2005, Kurt Campbell became the first player in the program's history to be drafted into the NFL. Campbell was selected in the seventh round by the Green Bay Packers.

In the 2007 NFL draft, Rashad Barksdale became the second player in school history to be drafted. He was selected in the sixth round by the Philadelphia Eagles. Barksdale was cut however at the end of training camp, but was signed by the Kansas City Chiefs, and became the first player in school history placed on an NFL 53-man roster.

Barksdale made his National Football League debut on October 7, 2007, against the Jacksonville Jaguars. It marked the first time a UAlbany player had appeared in an NFL regular-season game when he took the field on special teams. He also played on the punt cover and punt return units and recorded his first career tackle in the fourth quarter.

Barksdale was cut by the Chiefs on August 31, 2008. However, he signed with the New York Giants as a member of the practice squad for the 2008 season. On December 30, 2008, Barksdale became the first UA stand-out to make an NFL Playoff roster after the Giants signed him to replace corner Sam Madison, who went down with an ankle injury.

The highest ranked former Great Danes to be drafted was defensive end Jared Verse. Verse redshirted his freshman season at Albany. He made 22 tackles with 10 tackles for loss and four sacks over four games during his redshirt freshman season, which was shortened and played in early 2021 due to the COVID-19 pandemic. He was named second-team All-Colonial Athletic Association (CAA) and won the conference's Defensive Rookie of the Year award. In 2021, Verse was named first-team All-CAA after finishing the season with 53 tackles, 11.5 tackles for loss, 9.5 sacks, and one forced fumble.

In 2022, Verse announced he was transferring to Florida State University to play for the Seminoles. He finished his first season with the Seminoles with 48 tackles, 17 tackles for loss, and 9 sacks.[8] Verse declared for the 2024 NFL draft following the 2023 season and was drafted 19th overall by the Los Angeles Rams.

The Great Danes have sent multiple players to try-outs and NFL training camps as un-drafted free agents. In addition to the NFL, multiple alumni have participated in the Canadian Football League, Arena Football League and the XFL (2020). Many former coaching staff members have also coached in the NFL, including former NFL head coach Dave Campo. From 2006 to 2010, Tony Sparano Jr. and Andy Sparano were key figures on the Great Danes roster. At the same time, their father, Tony Sparano, was head coach of the Miami Dolphins. From 2017-2018, the son of well known former NFL QB Vinny Testaverde, Vincent Testaverde Jr., played for the Great Danes. In 2018, he was named the team's starting quarterback for the season. Testaverde started a total of eight games on the year and recorded 1,714 passing yards and 11 touchdowns.

The strongest connection to the NFL is the university hosting the New York Giants Summer Training Camp. From 1996 to 2012, the university's practice fields were handed over to the Giants, bringing fans and media from around New York and the United States to Albany. In 2007, the school dedicated the university's football practice field in honor of Wellington Mara and Preston Robert Tisch, the late co-owners of the Giants. Mara and Tisch were instrumental in making the University at Albany home to the Giants' summer training camp.

=== Men's Basketball ===
==== Doc Sauers era ====
Richard "Doc" Sauers served as Great Danes men's basketball coach from 1955 to 1997. He led the program to eleven NCAA and four NAIA post-season tournament appearances in his tenure. Sauers finished his career with a 702–330 record in 41 seasons. Sauers achieved the 700-win mark on February 8, 1997, in an 89–71 victory over the University of Bridgeport. He would retire one month later and be inducted into the school's Hall of Fame in 2004. A banner is flown in the rafters of the SEFCU Arena honoring Sauers's accomplishment of 702 wins.

==== Division I era ====
The process to become a Division I program was slow. From the 1999–2000 season, the first year in Division I, to the end of the 2004–05 season, UAlbany recorded a 48–118 record. The team finished with over 10 victories in only two seasons. However, in the 2005–06 campaign, the Great Danes compiled a 21–11 season. In that season, the Great Danes would take on both the eventual national champion Florida Gators and UCLA Bruins, both of which would play each other for the national championship.

==== "Why Not Us?: The 2005–06 Season" ====
On March 11, 2006, the men's basketball team won the America East conference tournament, earning the school (and the SUNY system) its first-ever berth to the NCAA Men's Division I Basketball Tournament, defeating the University of Vermont 80–67 in a sold-out RACC. The Great Danes were seeded #16 in the Washington, D.C., region and were matched up against top-seeded UConn. Despite the #16 seed being 0–87 before Albany took the floor, head coach Will Brown believed that his team had a chance to beat UConn in the tournament. With that, the team took the motto, "Why Not Us?". Fans and alumni wore shirts with the motto.

On March 17, 2006, the Danes nearly became the first #16 seed to defeat a #1 seed in the Division I tournament. The Danes, down only 1 at the half, went on a 13–0 run early in the second half to take a double-digit lead over the Huskies. With the game televised on CBS, the Danes led 50–38 with just over 11 minutes left in the game. However, a late run by the Huskies' stifling defense stopped the Danes' offense, and the Huskies averted the upset, winning 72–59. The play against UConn gave the program instant notoriety.

=== Women's Basketball ===
UAlbany Women's Basketball had little success on the court since it started play in 1964–65. Its greatest success took place in 1985–86 when it went 26–4 and made it the 3rd Round of the NCAA Division III Tournament. Coach Mari Warner would lead the program into Division I play in 1999–00, but again success was limited. Through the 2000s under new coach Trina Patterson, winning was also limited. However, things began to change in 2010–11 under former head coach Katie Abrahamson-Henderson. That season UA finished over .500 for the first time since 1997–98. Abrahamson-Henderson led UAlbany to its then-best record in Division I history in the 2011–12, going 23–10 overall. The Great Danes brought home their first-ever America East Conference title, and represented the league in the NCAA Tournament. They would go on to win six straight conference titles.

=== Men's Lacrosse ===
The program began in 1970 with a 3–7 record competing in Division III. In 1975, the program would reach the ECAC Division III Tournament under coach Dave Armstrong. From 1975 to 1997, the Great Danes would reach two more ECAC Division III Tournaments. In 1997, the Great Danes would reach the finals of the ECAC Division II Tournament. In 2000, the Great Danes began play in the America East at the Division I level.

==== Thompson trio ====
Much of the Great Danes success in 2013 was centered around one family. Miles Thompson, Ty Thompson and Lyle Thompson (also known as the Thompson trio), were a vital part of the Great Danes offense. Miles and Lyle are brothers, while Ty is their cousin (another brother, Jeremy Thompson played for Syracuse until 2011). All three were star recruits coming to UAlbany. The three were born in the Onondaga Nation, a nine-square-mile independent political entity recognized by the United States. Each of the Thompsons wore a traditional native hair style, with long braids that became their trademark on the field. The three also became known for their skills on the field, which involved trick passes and stick handling, behind-the-back shots, one-handed shots and their quick agility.

In 2013, Ty Thompson would score 51 goals, Miles would score 42 and Lyle 46 goals going into the NCAA Tournament. The fourth leading scorers for the Great Danes, Will Fuller and John Maloney, had only 18 goals. Lyle Thompson would be the key factor for the Great Danes. The sophomore was vital in leading the No. 1 offense in the nation with 108 points through 17 games. Lyle became the eighth men's lacrosse player in NCAA history to record 100 points in a season. He finished seven points behind all-time NCAA record holder Steve Marahol's (UMBC) 114 points (37g, 77a) set in 1992. He would win the America East Player of the Year Award and became the second Great Dane to be named a Tewaaraton Award finalist, and the first Native American to be named a Tewaaraton Award finalist.

In 2014, the Thompsons would continue their unbelievable play. Despite a shaky 9–5 regular season, the Great Danes would be the #1 overall seed in the America East Tournament. Lyle would become only the third player in conference history to win back-to-back Player of the Year Awards. Earning at least four points in all 14 games played, the junior attack has earned a Division I-best 61 assists and 37 goals in the regular season. In the American East Tournament, Lyle became the first Division I player ever to earn two 100-point seasons. On May 3, 2014, the Great Danes would win their second straight America East Championship, defeating UMBC 20–11.

On May 10, 2014, the Great Danes would take on Loyola in the first round of the NCAA Tournament. Loyola was the number-one-ranked team in the nation going into the game. The Great Danes, with strong defensive play, defeated the Greyhounds 13–6 for the second NCAA Tournament victory in school history. In the game Lyle would become the DI single season record holder in points, beating out Marahol's record he just missed in the previous season. In the game Miles would also pass Marahol's numbers to become second on that list after scoring five goals and two assists. The Great Danes would end up losing 14–13 in overtime to Notre Dame in the Quarterfinals the following week.

As a junior Lyle would compile the top single season point total in DI history, earning 128 points as well as tying the DI single season assists record with 77, adding 51 goals. He became the first player in DI history to have a pair of 100+ point seasons after finishing with 113 last year. In UAlbany's 18 games in 2014 he scored at least four points, including 11 seven+ point contests. He was named Division I Outstanding Player of the Year and the DI Outstanding Attackman by the United States Intercollegiate Lacrosse Association (USILA) in 2014.

On May 29, 2014, both Miles and Lyle Thompson were named the co-winners of the 2014 Tewaaraton Trophy. It was the first time ever that two players shared, and a Native American was awarded, the trophy. Two days later, Miles and Ty were officially put on the active roster of the MLL Rochester Rattlers. It was also announced that Miles would return to the program in 2015 as a Graduate Assistant.

The success of the Thompson trio on the field led to a national press following in late 2014. CNN, CBS and ABC all did nightly news pieces on the three. The NY Times also did a story on them, which was posted on the front page of the newspaper. In all the pieces the three talked about their heritage, the acceptance of their heritage at UAlbany, supporting the Onondaga Nation and promoting the game of lacrosse.

==== One of the greats ====
In 2015, Lyle Thompson cemented himself as one of the greatest collegiate lacrosse players in NCAA history. He was named the recipient of the 2015 Tewaaraton Trophy for the top player in men's lacrosse and was the first-ever male lacrosse player to earn the award in two consecutive seasons. In 2015, Thompson led the NCAA in points per game for the third-straight year with 6.37 a contest and assists per game at 3.63 a contest. He finished with an NCAA Division I best 121 points, the second-highest single season tally in DI history, and 69 assists, adding 52 goals. He would lead UAlbany to a third-consecutive America East regular season and tournament title. The Great Danes would take on Cornell in the first round of the NCAA Tournament, winning 19–10. In a rematch of the 2014 quarterfinals, UAlbany would fall to Notre Dame 14–10. Thompson finished his career as the all-time Division I points and assists leader, concluding with 400 points off 175 goals and 225 assists from 2012 to 2015 with UAlbany. In his career he played in 70 games, scoring in 68 of them and earned multiple points in each of his last 44 games, including all contests in 2014 and 2015.

==== #1 ranking and the Final Four ====
2018 started with much-anticipated hype, as the Great Danes looked like they would have one of the best offenses in the nation, led by Senior Connor Fields and incoming freshman Tehoka Nanticoke, one of the most highly ranked high school players in the nation. The Great Danes would open up the season ranked #3 in the nation. UAlbany did not disappoint, crushing Syracuse 15–3 in their first game. One week later, after an 18–5 win over the Drexel, the Great Danes would be ranked as the #1 team in the nation by the United States Intercollegiate Lacrosse Association (USILA) coaches poll and the Inside Lacrosse Maverik media poll. It would be the first time that any UAlbany Division I team, and any DI program affiliated with the State of New York (SUNY) system, had been ranked #1 in its history. The Great Danes would win eight consecutive games as the #1 ranked team in the nation, including an amazing 4th quarter comeback against #2 ranked Maryland 11–10 on March 10 of 2018. The streak and #1 ranking would last until April 6, when UAlbany was upset by UMBC 11–7.

Most of the mid-season success for UAlbany came without their key weapons on the field. Connor Fields suffered a knee injury in a March 24 victory over UMAss-Lowell. He would re-injure the knee in the second to last game of the season in a 14–6 loss to Yale. However, new stars would rise to lead the Great Danes to success. Sophomore Faceoff Specialists TD Ierlan became a star, becoming one of the elite face-off men in the country. Sophomore Jakob Patterson and Senior Kyle McClancy stepped up on offense, while goalie JD Colarusso was a force in net.

The Great Danes would run through the America East Tournament as the #1 seed and host to take home the title on May 5 in a 14–4 win over Vermont. UAlbany would be given the #2 overall seed in the 2018 NCAA Lacrosse Tournament and would host the Southern Conference champion Richmond Spiders in the 1st Round of the tournament. Despite a close game early on, UAlbany would win 18–9 to advance to the NCAA Quarterfinals to face the Denver Pioneers at Hofstra.

The May 19th match-up put two elite programs head to head. However, much hype was focused on the battle of the top two faceoff-men in the country, UAlbany's TD Ierlan and Denver's Trevor Baptiste. In this game, each player would go 15-of-30. Ierlan had the final faceoff victory and ground ball with 38 seconds left as UAlbany ran out the clock for the win. During the game Ierlan would win his 341st faceoff victory of the season, setting a new NCAA single season record. The former record holder was Brendan Fowler, who had 339 faceoff wins for Duke in 2013. The game was tight to the end, with the Great Danes holding a four-goal lead with under five minutes to play. Despite a furious comeback, UAlbany held on 15–13 to advance to the Final Four for the first time in school history after going 0–4 in their previous trips to the Quarterfinals. It would be the first time a SUNY school earned a trip to a Men's Division I Final Four. UAlbany also matched its single season wins record with its 16th victory today. UAlbany was 16–3 in 2015. Also, UAlbany's senior class earned its 59th victory, becoming the winningest class in program history. The class was 59–11 overall in its four years.

== Championships and NCAA Tournaments (since 2001) ==
=== America East Conference ===
Sport	Regular Season champ.	Division Champ.	Conference Champ.	NCAA Tournament At-Large	NCAA Final Four
Women's Tennis			2016		
Baseball			2007		
Men's Basketball	2005–06; 2014–15		2005–06; 2006–07; 2012–13; 2013–14; 2014–15		
Women's Basketball	2012–13; 2013–14; 2014–15; 2015–16; 2022–23; 2024–25		2011–12 to 2016–17 (6 straight); 2021–2022		
Field Hockey	2006; 2008; 2009; 2014; 2023	2015; 2016; 2017; 2018	2008; 2010; 2012; 2014; 2015; 2018; 2022		2014
Women's Golf			2004; 2008; 2009		
Men's Lacrosse	2002; 2003; 2007; 2013–2017 (5 straight); 2018; 2024; 2026		2003–2005 (3 straight); 2007; 2013–2015 (3 straight); 2017; 2018; 2024-2026 (3 straight)	2016	2018
Women's Lacrosse	2010; 2011; 2014; 2023; 2024		2011; 2012; 2023; 2025; 2026	2015; 2017	
Men's Soccer	2004; 2015; 2026		2016; 2017		
Women's Soccer	2016; 2019		2015; 2016; 2018		
Softball	2004; 2005; 2008; 2011; 2013; 2018		2005; 2006; 2007; 2011; 2014; 2017; 2018; 2024		
Men's Indoor Track and Field			2002–03; 2003–04; 2005–06 to 2016–17 (12 straight); 2018–2019; 2019-2020; 2023-2024 & 2024-2025		
Men's Outdoor Track and Field			2003; 2005–2022 (17 straight - no 2021 season due to COVID-19); 2025		
Women's Outdoor Track and Field			2006; 2007; 2009–2025 (16 straight - no 2021 season due to COVID-19)		
Women's Indoor Track and Field			2009–10; 2010–11; 2012–13 to 2021-22 (9 straight...no Championship in 20-21 due to COVID-19 Pandemic); 2023-2024 & 2024-2025		
Women's Volleyball	2004; 2005; 2006; 2008–12 (5 straight); 2015°; 2017; 2019; 2021		2004; 2006–08 (3 straight); 2010; 2011; 2019		
Men's Cross Country			2011		
Women's Cross Country			2018		

° – Signifies Co-Champions

+ – Starting in the 2015 season the America East Conference was split into an East and West Division for Field Hockey. This was discontinued after the 2019 season.

+ – Due to the COVID-19 Pandemic, in the 2021 season the America East Conference was split into a A and B Division for Baseball

^ – Women's Tennis discontinued after the 2016 season

On Sunday, May 14, 2017, with Softball winning the 2017 America East Championship, UAlbany recorded its 100th Conference Championship since joining Division I athletics in 1999.

As an athletic department, UAlbany won the 2004–05, 2012–13 to 2017–18 and the 2021–22 Stuart P. Haskell, Jr. Commissioner's Cup. The Commissioner's Cup annually recognizes the strongest athletic program in America East as determined by a scoring system that rewards a school for success both during the regular season and at championship competition in the conference's 22 sports.

=== Metro Atlantic Athletic Conference ===
Sport	Conference Tournament Championships
Women's Golf	2015, 2018, 2019, 2024

=== Football Postseason ===
Year	Conference	Coach	Overall record	Conf. rec.	Postseason game	Venue	Rival	Round	Result
2002	Northeast Conference	Bob Ford	8–4	6–1	ECAC Bowl	University Field (Albany)	Duquesne Dukes	---	24–0
2003	Northeast Conference °	Bob Ford	7–4	6–1					
2007	Northeast Conference	Bob Ford	8–4	6–0	Gridiron Classic	Welcome Stadium	Dayton Flyers	---	21–42
2008	Northeast Conference	Bob Ford	9–3	7–0	Gridiron Classic	University Field (Albany)	Jacksonville Dolphins	---	28–0
2011	Northeast Conference °	Bob Ford	8–4	7–1	NCAA Division I Football Championship	Kenneth P. LaValle Stadium	Stony Brook Seawolves	1	28–31
2012	Northeast Conference °	Bob Ford	9–2	7–1					
2019	CAA Football (NCAA At-Large Selection)	Greg Gattuso	9–5	6–2	NCAA Division I Football Championship	Bob Ford Field at Tom & Mary Casey Stadium; Bobcat Stadium	Central Connecticut; Montana State	1; 2	42–14; 47–21
2023	CAA Football °	Greg Gattuso	11–4	7–1	NCAA Division I Football Championship	BYE; Bob Ford Field at Tom & Mary Casey Stadium; Kibbie Dome; Dana J. Dykhouse Stadium	BYE; Richmond Spiders; Idaho Vandals; South Dakota State Jackrabbits	Bye; 2 QF; SF	Bye; 49–13; 30–22; 0–59
Conference Championships: 7

° – Signifies Co-Champions

== Other Division I athletic success ==
- In 2016, Albany Great Danes men's soccer would make the programs first trip to the NCAA Tournament. They would defeat Boston College 3–0 in the Second Round after receiving the #14 seed and earning a First Round bye. They would lose 3–1 to Clemson University in the Third Round.
- In 2014, field hockey became the first team to make the Final Four in any NCAA Tournament after defeating the University of Maryland. They would lose 1–0 to UConn in the National Semi-finals. Sophomore midfielder Paula Heuser was named NFHCA National Player of the Year.
- In 2013, women's basketball became the 7th team in America East Conference history to go unbeaten in the regular season. They defeated Stony Brook 60–49 on March 2, 2013. It was the first-ever conference regular-season title for the program at the Division I level. On March 16, 2013, UAlbany defeated Hartford 61–52 to become the 4th team in America East history to go undefeated through an entire season and win back-to-back AE Championships. They would go into the tournament at 27–3 and a 19-game win streak. They would be the #14 seed and take on the University of North Carolina. Despite leading 28–23 at the half, UAlbany would fall to the Tar Heels 59–54.
- In 2011, the Women's Lacrosse team would finish the regular season a perfect 17–0. They would be the only team to finish the regular season undefeated in the nation going into the NCAA Tournament. The trip to the NCAA Tournament would be the first in program history. They would defeat UMBC 11–4 in the America East Championship. They would be seeded #7 in the tournament, however would have to play their first-round game at Dartmouth (conflict with universities graduation weekend). They would defeat Dartmouth 10–7, however lose in the Quarterfinals 18–4 to Northwestern. They would finish the season a program-best 18–1.
- The Athletic Program would win a record-tying eight conference titles in the 2006–2007 school year, including five during the spring sports period. The Great Danes took home the conference championship in women's volleyball, men's indoor track & field, men's basketball, men's lacrosse, men's & women's outdoor track & field, baseball and softball.
- The women's volleyball team in 2006 became the first team in school history to host a Division I NCAA Tournament event. In 2007, the Great Danes won their second consecutive America East Conference championship and defeated Cleveland State 3–0 to win their first NCAA Division I Tournament match.
- Men's soccer goalkeeper Bouna Coundoul would sign a contract with the Colorado Rapids of Major League Soccer and make his professional debut, the first for an Albany alumni in the major-American (NFL, MLB, NBA, NHL, MLS etc.) sports, on May 13, 2006. In January 2008, Coundoul was named to the Senegal National Soccer Team to compete in the 2008 African Cup of Nations Tournament in Ghana. The African Cup is the highest-level soccer championship tournament in Africa. With being named, Coundoul became the first MLS player to ever compete in the tournament. In 2009, goalkeeper Steward Ceus became the first Great Dane selected in the MLS Draft when he was selected by the Colorado Rapids to replace Coundoul after he left to free agency.
- UAlbany has had nine players selected in the Major League Baseball First-Year Player Draft: Terry Kenny (9th round, 1974, San Francisco Giants), Steve Checksfield (10th round, 2001, Houston Astros), Mike Grasso (11th round, 2002, Atlanta Braves), Adam Kroft (30th round, 2004, San Diego Padres), Tom Hill (34th round, 2007, Kansas City Royals), Mike Konstanty (39th round, 2008, Cincinnati Reds), Dave Kubiak (36th round, 2011, Tampa Bay Rays), Sean Lucas (25th round, 2012, Cincinnati Reds), and Stephen Woods (6th round, 2013, Tampa Bay Rays), (HS – did not sign). Woods was drafted again in 2016 by the San Francisco Giants in the 8th round. Woods was selected and pitched for Italy national baseball team in the 2023 World Baseball Classic. No Great Dane has ever played in the majors.
- Softball won three straight conference titles from 2005 to 2007. The team would win its first NCAA Division I Tournament game and advance to its first regional final after defeating Harvard 1–0 and Hofstra 4–2 in 2007.
- Four former student-athletes have competed in the Summer Olympics. Andy Seras competed in the 149.5-pound Greco-Roman wrestling group in the 1988 Seoul Olympics for Team USA. Shawn Sheldon competed in the 114.5-pound Greco-Roman wrestling group in the 1992 Barcelona Olympics for Team USA. Rob Caracciolo competed in the 1,500-meter Track and Field event in the 2004 Athens Olympics for Equatorial Guinea while Grace Claxton became the first female athlete to represent UAlbany as she competed in the 400m hurdles in the 2016 Summer Olympics representing Puerto Rico. Claxton would also compete in the same event in the 2024 Summer Olympics. A fifth former Albany student-athlete, Hall of Fame women's basketball coach Tara VanDerveer, led Team USA to a gold medal in the 1996 Games. VanDerveer played at Albany in the 1971–72 season before transferring to Indiana.

== Rivalries ==
=== Siena ===
UAlbany's biggest local rival is Siena University located in Loudonville, NY. Both schools are separated by 8 miles (13 km).

While teams do not participate in the same conference, teams from multiple sports will face each other annually, with the strongest part of the rivalry lying with men's basketball. Both teams met for the 50th time in 2010. The first match-up was February 23, 1957, in which Siena defeated Albany 75–66 at Albany. After nearly twenty years, the series ended on February 3, 1977, with a 62–49 Albany victory.

The series resumed in 2001. From 2001 to 2014, all games took place in the Times Union Center, officially making it a home game for Siena. During that time the game averaged an attendance over 10,000 for the annual match-up. In 2015, under a new contract, it was announced that the rivalry would be moved to SEFCU Arena during the 2016–2017 season and would be part of "tournament" during the 2017–18 season.

While the women's basketball match-up receives less fan fare than the men's game, it is part of the Albany Cup battle. Their first match-up was in the 1975–76 season.

While both the men's and women's basketball games battle for the Albany Cup, the rivalry has been dubbed the "Crosstown Showdown" by sportscasters in the Capital Region.

=== Stony Brook ===
Stony Brook University is UAlbany's biggest SUNY rival and has had intense competition in sports like men's basketball and lacrosse is recent years.

In men's basketball, it has been a similar situation. While Albany has had more historical success overall in the NCAA since 2000, they had lost to Stony Brook in three straight America East Tournament games (2010, 2011, 2012). In 2012, the Great Danes, as the #4 seed in the tournament, knocked off the Seawolves, the #1 seed, in the quarterfinals to end the streak. In 2014 and 2015, both teams would meet in back-to-back championship games, 2014 in Stony Brook and 2015 in Albany, with Albany winning both games in the last minute.

Baseball has also seen some good moments. UAlbany eliminated Stony Brook in the 2011 AE Tournament, even though Stony Brook swept them in four straight games of the regular season. In 2010, Stony Brook defeated UAlbany in the America East Championship. In 2012, Stony Brook defeated the Great Danes in three out of four regular season match-ups in their memorable run to the College World Series.

However, the biggest hate between the two schools takes place in the Albany–Stony Brook football rivalry. From 1999 to 2006, the two programs were both associate members of the Northeast Conference. During that time, UAlbany went 5–3 against the Seawolves. Stony Brook would leave the NEC in 2007 to become independent and joined the Big South Conference in 2008. The two teams would meet in 2006 in a non-league game at University Field, in which the Great Danes defeated Stony Brook 24–23.

The two teams would not meet again until November 26, 2011. However, this meeting would be different. The two teams each won their respective conference titles and were meeting in the First Round of the FCS Playoffs. For both programs, it was their first time being in the FCS Playoffs since joining Division I athletics. The match-up also had the story line that Stony Brook head coach Chuck Priore was a 1982 UAlbany graduate who started three seasons at fullback, then served for three years as UAlbany's running backs and strength coach for head coach Bob Ford. UAlbany would have a 28–10 third-quarter lead, but the Seawolves answered with 21 points to take the lead. However, UAlbany would have a chance to win the game at the goal-line with under a minute to play. On second-and-goal from the Stony Brook 3-yard line, Dan Di Lella had a pass intercepted in the end zone by free safety Dominick Reyes with 47.4 seconds left as the Seawolves held on for a 31–28 victory before 8,286 fans at La Valle Stadium and advance to the Second Round.

The rivalry was rejuvenated in August 2012, when it was announced the Great Danes and Stony Brook would become associate football members in the Colonial Athletic Association starting in 2013. The teams met for the first time as CAA rivals on November 23, 2013, on Long Island.

Since 2013, the two teams face each other in CAA Football in a rivalry game designated as "The Empire Clash". Starting in 2015, the winner of the game is awarded The Golden Apple Trophy.

Starting in the 2022–2023 academic year Stony Brook joined the CAA full time, all but eliminating yearly competition in athletics outside of football except for limited non-conference scheduling.

=== Binghamton ===
A notable rivalry exists between the Great Danes and the Binghamton University Bearcats. Both teams joined the America East conference around the same time, when they were relatively new to Division I sports. Their SUNY connection as well as geographic proximity has fostered the rivalry and generated the name, "The I-88 Rivalry (Interstate 88)." Both teams post the largest away crowds at either school's athletic events.

=== Vermont ===
The athletic rivalry between Albany and the University of Vermont is mainly focused on basketball. The rivalry has been based around the success the two programs had from 2003 to 2007, in which the two teams combined for five America East Titles. In that time frame, UAlbany and UVM met twice in the America East Tournament finals with the Great Danes winning both games. The first win came in 2006 at home and the second came in 2007 at Vermont (Albany's first-ever win at Vermont). In 2013, the teams would meet again in the America East Championship in Burlington. For the third time, the Great Danes would defeat the Catamounts.

== Annual events ==
The Department of Athletics annually hosts two major sporting events. The first event is the Homecoming Football Game.

The university's first Homecoming Weekend was held October 31, 1953, and it featured a soccer game, punch party, and a dance. This first Homecoming appears to have been organized by the Senior Class, reuniting the Classes of 1951, 1952, and 1953.

Every fall since then, the UAlbany campus becomes a hub of activity during Homecoming/Family Weekend. One highlight of the Weekend is checking out Great Dane Athletics. The highest level of tail-gating takes place during this weekend while the university hosts the Homecoming Touchdown Tailgate.

During Homecoming Weekend, the Athletic Department also enshrines players, coaches and administration from the past into the UAlbany Athletic Hall of Fame. The most recent inductees can be found at the UAlbany Athletic Website.

The second yearly event is the Big Purple Growl & Ferocious Feast. Since 1997 the Big Purple Growl & Ferocious Feast has been celebrated in early February. It is considered by many in the community to be the school's Winter Homecoming. The weekend coincides with home men's and women's basketball games. These games constantly produce the highest regular season attendance numbers for a home game. The Ferocious Feast is a pregame indoor tailgate with music, beer tasting, games and activities for all ages and great food.

The university also hosts an annual Cross Country Meet (UAlbany Invitational), Track and Field (UAlbany Classic) and other events.

Since 2021 Tom & Mary Casey Stadium has hosted the Premier Lacrosse League(PLL). In 2022 and 2023 the university has hosted the leagues training camp and opening weekend to the tour based schedule.

== Media coverage ==
UAlbany Football and Men's Basketball games started airing on ESPN Radio WTMM-FM FM 104.5 as of the 2016–17 school year after broadcasting for years on Fox Sports Radio WOFX AM 980 in Albany, NY. Roger Wyland has been the voice of the Great Danes since 1994.

With their steaming network deal with the America East, multiple sporting events are streamed on the ESPN+ app. Many other sporting events are broadcast on the AmericaEast.TV website and app. Football games are streamed on FloSports based on the CAA's streaming deal with the network.

WCDB has done select athletic events in past years. The station was at one point the exclusive home of UAlbany Women's Basketball, Men's Lacrosse and Women's Volleyball, doing select games every year.

== Fight song ==
"Purple and Gold", UAlbany's fight song, was written by John Regan and Jonathan Hansen, both members of the university's Chamber Singers. The song was released in 2000, the same year the school's athletics made the move to Division I.

Lyrics:

Purple and Gold, your colors shining through Hear as the carillons are ringing true The State of New York sends up its cheers to you Let's go Albany!

Hail, young and old We shall prevail, purple and gold One true triumphant call Albany Danes are standing tall

Purple and Gold, our flags are waving high Singing our victory song into the sky All of the world will fear our mighty cry Let's go Albany!

Hail, young and old We shall prevail, purple and gold One true triumphant call Albany Danes are standing tall

Purple and gold, your colors shining through Hear as the carillons are ringing true The State of New York sends up its cheer to you Let's go Albany!
