= 1974 Albany Great Danes football team =

American college football season

1974 Albany Great Danes football
- Conference: Independent
- Record: 9–0
- Head coach: Bob Ford (5th season)
- Home stadium: University Field

1974 NCAA Division III independents football records
	Conf.			Overall
Team	W	L	T	W		L		T
Albany		–		9	–	0	–	0
Colorado College		–		8	–	1	–	0
St. Norbert		–		8	–	2	–	0
Georgetown		–		6	–	2	–	0
Norwich		–		6	–	3	–	0
Millsaps		–		5	–	3	–	0
Grove City		–		5	–	3	–	1
Bridgeport		–		6	–	4	–	0
Ashland		–		5	–	5	–	0
Salisbury State		–		4	–	4	–	1
Trinity (TX)		–		5	–	5	–	1
Rochester (NY)		–		3	–	6	–	0
Saint Mary's		–		3	–	6	–	0
Saint Peter's		–		3	–	6	–	0
Cortland		–		2	–	6	–	1
Maryville (TN)		–		2	–	6	–	1
San Diego		–		3	–	8	–	0
Brockport		–		2	–	6	–	0
Fairleigh Dickinson–Florham		–		0	–	5	–	0
Chicago		–		0	–	8	–	0

The 1974 Albany Great Danes football team was an American football team that represented University at Albany, SUNY, as an independent during the 1974 NCAA Division III football season. In their fifth year under head coach Bob Ford, the Great Danes compiled a perfect 9–0 record and outscored opponents by a total of 367 to 86. Albany played home games at University Field in Albany, New York.

The team was led by quarterback John Bertuzzi who finished the season with 412 passing yards, seven touchdowns, and five interceptions.

== Schedule ==
Date	Opponent	Site	Result	Attendance	Source
September 21	at Hofstra	Hofstra Stadium; Hempstead, NY	W 33–7	1,500	
September 28	Alfred	University Field; Albany, NY	W 7–6	3,500	
October 5	RIT^{†}	University Field; Albany, NY	W 49–7	6,100	
October 12	at Massachusetts Maritime	Buzzards Bay, MA	W 75–6	1,000	
October 19	Nichols	University Field; Albany, NY	W 32–8	2,500	
October 26	Brockport	University Field; Albany, NY	W 35–14	2,500	
November 2	at Curry	Milton, MA	W 50–23	3,300	
November 9	at Plattsburgh	Plattsburgh, NY	W 49–8	750	
November 16	RPI	University Field; Albany, NY	W 37–7	3,500	
^{†}Homecoming
