= 1976 Albany Great Danes football team =

American college football season

1976 Albany Great Danes football
- Conference: Independent
- Record: 4–5
- Head coach: Bob Ford (7th season)
- Defensive coordinator: Al Bagnoli (1st season)
- Home stadium: University Field

1976 NCAA Division III independents football records
| | Conf. | | | Overall |
| Team | W | L | T | W | | L | | T |
|---|---|---|---|---|---|---|---|---|
| Colorado College | | – | | 7 | – | 1 | – | 1 |
| Maryville (TN) | | – | | 7 | – | 2 | – | 0 |
| Millsaps | | – | | 7 | – | 2 | – | 0 |
| Saint Peter's | | – | | 5 | – | 2 | – | 0 |
| Wabash | | – | | 7 | – | 3 | – | 0 |
| Canisius | | – | | 6 | – | 3 | – | 0 |
| Grove City | | – | | 6 | – | 3 | – | 0 |
| Norwich | | – | | 6 | – | 3 | – | 0 |
| Ashland | | – | | 6 | – | 4 | – | 0 |
| Rochester (NY) | | – | | 4 | – | 4 | – | 1 |
| Albany | | – | | 4 | – | 5 | – | 0 |
| Cortland | | – | | 4 | – | 5 | – | 0 |
| Brockport | | – | | 3 | – | 5 | – | 1 |
| Dayton | | – | | 4 | – | 7 | – | 0 |
| Saint Mary's | | – | | 3 | – | 6 | – | 0 |
| St. Norbert | | – | | 2 | – | 8 | – | 0 |
| San Diego | | – | | 1 | – | 7 | – | 1 |
| Fairleigh Dickinson–Florham | | – | | 1 | – | 6 | – | 0 |
| Bowie State | | – | | 1 | – | 6 | – | 0 |
| Georgetown | | – | | 1 | – | 7 | – | 0 |
| Plattsburgh | | – | | 1 | – | 7 | – | 0 |

The 1976 Albany Great Danes football team was an American football team that represented University at Albany, SUNY, as an independent during the 1976 NCAA Division III football season. In their seventh year under head coach Bob Ford, the Great Danes compiled a 4–5 record and were outscored by opponents by a total of 133 to 134. Albany played home games at University Field in Albany, New York.

== Schedule ==
| Date | Opponent | Site | Result | Attendance | Source |
|---|---|---|---|---|---|
| September 11 | Southern Connecticut | University Field; Albany, NY | L 0–10 | 3,100 | |
| September 18 | at Ithaca | South Hill Field; Ithaca, NY | L 0–24 | 6,000 | |
| September 25 | at Brockport | Brockport, NY | W 37–3 | 1,000 | |
| October 2 | RIT | University Field; Albany, NY | W 17–7 | 500 | |
| October 16 | Cortland^{†} | University Field; Albany, NY | W 25–14 | 1,000 | |
| October 23 | at Norwich | Sabine Field; Northfield, VT | L 20–24 | 2,200 | |
| October 30 | at Albright | Shirk Stadium; Reading, PA | L 7–28 | 2,100 | |
| November 6 | at Plattsburgh | Plattsburgh, NY | W 27–0 | | |
| November 13 | Springfield | University Field; Albany, NY | L 0–24 | 500 | |
^{†}Homecoming
