= Kurt Campbell =

Kurt Campbell may refer to:

- Kurt Campbell (linebacker) (born 1982), American football linebacker
- Kurt M. Campbell (born 1957), American diplomat
