= Bob Ford (American football) =

American football player and college athletics coach and administrator (born 1937)

Biographical details
- Born: September 11, 1937 (age 89)

Playing career

Football
- 1959: Springfield
- Position: Quarterback

Coaching career (HC unless noted)

Football
- 1959: St. Lawrence (DB)
- 1960–1963: Albright (offensive backs)
- 1964: Springfield (DB)
- 1965–1968: St. Lawrence
- 1969: Springfield (DC)
- 1970–2013: Albany

Lacrosse
- 1971–1973: Albany

Administrative career (AD unless noted)
- 1978–1982: Albany
- 1998–1999: Albany (interim AD)

Head coaching record
- Overall: 265–191–1 (football); 19–11 (lacrosse)
- Bowls: 2–1
- Tournaments: Football; 1–1 (NCAA D-III playoffs); 0–1 (NCAA D-I playoffs)

Accomplishments and honors

Championships
- Football; 1 ICAC (1965); 2 EFC (1997–1998); 6 NEC (2002–2003, 2007–2008, 2011–2012)

Awards
- Amos Alonzo Stagg Award (2025)

Robert Ford (born September 10, 1937) is a retired American football player, coach of football, lacrosse, golf, and wrestling, and college athletics administrator. Ford was appointed as the head coach of the University at Albany on April 27, 1970 where he remained until retiring after the 2013 season. From 1965 to 1968, Ford served as the head football coach at St. Lawrence University in Canton, New York. He also coached golf and wrestling at Albright College in Reading, Pennsylvania, where was an assistant football coach from 1960 to 1963. Ford was Albany's head men's lacrosse coach from 1971 to 1973 and athletic director from 1978 to 1982.

== Head coaching record ==
=== Football ===
From the time he was appointed as the Albany head coach, Ford's teams played football as a club sport for three years, 1970 to 1972. His coaching record during that period was 12–9–1. Those 22 games are not included in the coaching record shown below.

Year	Team	Overall	Conference	Standing	Bowl/playoffs
St. Lawrence Saints (Independent College Athletic Conference) (1965–1968)
1965	St. Lawrence	4–4	2–1	T–1st	
1966	St. Lawrence	2–6	2–1	2nd	
1967	St. Lawrence	1–6–1	0–2–1	4th	
1968	St. Lawrence	2–6	1–3	5th	
St. Lawrence:		9–22–1	5–7–1		
Albany Great Danes (NCAA Division III independent) (1973–1994)
1973	Albany	7–2			
1974	Albany	9–0			
1975	Albany	7–2			
1976	Albany	4–5			
1977	Albany	9–2			L NCAA Division III Semifinal
1978	Albany	7–3			
1979	Albany	6–3			
1980	Albany	5–5			
1981	Albany	7–3			
1982	Albany	6–3			
1983	Albany	3–7			
1984	Albany	5–5			
1985	Albany	9–2			W ECAC North Championship
1986	Albany	4–6			
1987	Albany	5–5			
1988	Albany	5–5			
1989	Albany	5–4			
1990	Albany	3–7			
1991	Albany	5–5			
1992	Albany	6–4			
1993	Albany	6–4			
1994	Albany	4–6			
Albany Great Danes (NCAA Division II independent) (1995–1996)
1995	Albany	3–7			
1996	Albany	7–3			
Albany Great Danes (Eastern Football Conference) (1997–1998)
1997	Albany	11–1	8–0	1st (Atlantic)	W Eastern Football Conference Championship
1998	Albany	10–1	7–1	1st (Atlantic)	W Eastern Football Conference Championship
Albany Great Danes (Northeast Conference) (1999–2012)
1999	Albany	7–2	6–1	2nd	
2000	Albany	5–6	5–3	4th	
2001	Albany	7–3	5–2	T–3rd	
2002	Albany	8–4	6–1	1st	W ECAC Bowl
2003	Albany	7–4	6–1	T–1st	
2004	Albany	4–7	4–3	3rd	
2005	Albany	5–6	4–3	T–3rd	
2006	Albany	7–4	5–2	T–2nd	
2007	Albany	8–4	6–0	1st	L Gridiron Classic
2008	Albany	9–3	7–0	1st	W Gridiron Classic
2009	Albany	7–4	6–2	T–2nd	
2010	Albany	6–5	4–4	T–4th	
2011	Albany	8–4	7–1	T–1st	L NCAA Division I First Round
2012	Albany	9–2	7–1	T–1st	
Albany Great Danes (Colonial Athletic Association) (2013)
2013	Albany	1–11	0–8	11th	
Albany:		256–169	93–33		
Total:		265–191–1			
National championship Conference title Conference division title or championship game berth

== See also ==
- List of college football career coaching wins leaders
- List of college football seasons coached leaders
