= 2014 Texas Tech Red Raiders football team =

American college football season

2014 Texas Tech Red Raiders football
- Conference: Big 12 Conference
- Record: 4–8 (2–7 Big 12)
- Head coach: Kliff Kingsbury (2nd season)
- Offensive coordinator: Eric Morris (2nd season)
- Offensive scheme: Air raid
- Defensive coordinator: Matt Wallerstedt (2nd season; first 3 games)
- Co-defensive coordinator: Mike Smith (2nd season)
- Base defense: Multiple
- Home stadium: Jones AT&T Stadium

2014 Big 12 Conference football standings
	Conf.			Overall
Team	W		L	W		L
No. 7 Baylor +	8	–	1	11	–	2
No. 3 TCU +	8	–	1	12	–	1
No. 18 Kansas State	7	–	2	9	–	4
Oklahoma	5	–	4	8	–	5
West Virginia	5	–	4	7	–	6
Texas	5	–	4	6	–	7
Oklahoma State	4	–	5	7	–	6
Texas Tech	2	–	7	4	–	8
Kansas	1	–	8	3	–	9
Iowa State	0	–	9	2	–	10
+ – Conference co-champions; Rankings from AP Poll

The 2014 Texas Tech Red Raiders football team represented Texas Tech University in the 2014 NCAA Division I FBS football season as members of the Big 12 Conference. Kliff Kingsbury lead the Red Raiders in his second season as the program's fifteenth head coach. The Red Raiders played home games on the university's campus in Lubbock, Texas at Jones AT&T Stadium. They finished the season 4–8, 2–7 in Big 12 play to finish in eighth place.

== Preseason ==
Quarterback Davis Webb was named as the starter at the position and was selected for the Maxwell Award and Manning Award watch lists. Running back/linebacker Kenny Williams was selected for the Paul Hornung Award watchlist. Placekicker Ryan Bustin was selected for the Lou Groza Award watchlist. Le'Raven Clark was selected for the Outland Trophy and Lombardi Award watchlists, in addition to being selected as a preseason 2nd Team All-American selection by USA Today. Jakeem Grant was named to the Fred Biletnikoff Award watchlist.

As of April 2014, there were 34,100 season tickets were sold for the 2014 season, surpassing the previous season ticket record of 32,227 that were purchased prior to the start of the 2010 season. The Texas Tech athletic department would go on to sell out the stadium through season tickets alone for the 2014 season with a record of 38,502 season tickets purchased.

=== Coaching changes ===
- Sonny Cumbie replaced at the co-OC/WR coaches position by Eric Morris.
- Defensive coordinator Matt Wallerstedt resigned following allegations that he was under the influence of an unknown substance following game three. He was replaced by co-DC Mike Smith.

=== Transfers ===
Incoming

Name	Pos.	Height	Weight	Hometown	Prev. school
Nic Shimonek	QB	6'3	225	Corsicana, TX	Iowa
Dominique Robertson	OT	6'5	300	Riverside, CA	Riverside Community College
Devin Lauderdale	WR	5'11	170	Houston, TX	Navarro College
Jamarcus Howard	CB	5'11	190	Coffeyville, KS	Coffeyville Community College
Josh Keys	S	6'1	192	Seminary, MS	Mississippi Gulf Coast Community College
Keland McElrath	DT	6'5	290	Clarksdale, MS	Coahoma Community College
Rika Kevi	DT	6'2	350	San Francisco, CA	College of San Mateo
Marcus Smith	DT	6'3	305	Highland, KS	Highland Community College
Brandon Thorpe	DE	6'5	275	Tucker, GA	Highland Community College
Shaquille Davis	OT	6'4	320	Walnut, CA	Mount San Antonio College

=== Recruiting class ===
College recruiting
Name	Hometown	School	Height	Weight	Commit date
Jakari Dillard; Wide receiver	Princeton, TX	Princeton High School	6 ft 4 in (1.93 m)	180 lb (82 kg)	Aug 10, 2012
Jakari Dillard; Wide receiver	Recruit ratings: Scout: Rivals: 247Sports: ESPN:				
Justin Stockton; Running back	Cibolo, TX	Byron P. Steele II High School	5 ft 9 in (1.75 m)	180 lb (82 kg)	Jan 19, 2013
Justin Stockton; Running back	Recruit ratings: Scout: Rivals: 247Sports: ESPN:				
Demarcus Felton; Running back	Houston, TX	Dekaney High School	5 ft 7 in (1.70 m)	179 lb (81 kg)	Apr 17, 2013
Demarcus Felton; Running back	Recruit ratings: Scout: Rivals: 247Sports: ESPN:				
Ian Sadler; Wide receiver	Argyle, TX	Argyle High School	5 ft 10 in (1.78 m)	194 lb (88 kg)	Apr 20, 2013
Ian Sadler; Wide receiver	Recruit ratings: Scout: Rivals: 247Sports: ESPN:				
Patrick Mahomes; Quarterback	Whitehouse, TX	Whitehouse High School	6 ft 3 in (1.91 m)	198 lb (90 kg)	Apr 22, 2013
Patrick Mahomes; Quarterback	Recruit ratings: Scout: Rivals: 247Sports: ESPN:				
Cameron Batson; Wide receiver	Oklahoma City, OK	Millwood High School	5 ft 8 in (1.73 m)	164 lb (74 kg)	Apr 22, 2013
Cameron Batson; Wide receiver	Recruit ratings: Scout: Rivals: 247Sports: ESPN:				
Tevin Madison; Wide receiver	Fayette, AL	Fayette County High School	5 ft 10 in (1.78 m)	160 lb (73 kg)	Apr 22, 2013
Tevin Madison; Wide receiver	Recruit ratings: Scout: Rivals: 247Sports: ESPN:				
Byron Daniels; Wide receiver	San Antonio, TX	James Madison High School	6 ft 1 in (1.85 m)	170 lb (77 kg)	May 8, 2013
Byron Daniels; Wide receiver	Recruit ratings: Scout: Rivals: 247Sports: ESPN:				
Justin Murphy; Offensive line	Belton, TX	Belton High School	6 ft 8 in (2.03 m)	276 lb (125 kg)	Jun 11, 2013
Justin Murphy; Offensive line	Recruit ratings: Scout: Rivals: 247Sports: ESPN:				
Derrick Dixon; Defensive back	Dallas, TX	Skyline High School	5 ft 10 in (1.78 m)	195 lb (88 kg)	Jun 19, 2013
Derrick Dixon; Defensive back	Recruit ratings: Scout: Rivals: 247Sports: ESPN:				
Joseph Clark; Defensive back	Tyler, TX	Chapel Hill High School	5 ft 8 in (1.73 m)	178 lb (81 kg)	Jul 28, 2013
Joseph Clark; Defensive back	Recruit ratings: Scout: Rivals: 247Sports: ESPN:				
Jah'Shawn Johnson; Athlete	Ennis, TX	Ennis High School	5 ft 10 in (1.78 m)	170 lb (77 kg)	Aug 13, 2013
Jah'Shawn Johnson; Athlete	Recruit ratings: Scout: Rivals: 247Sports: ESPN:				
Dakota Allen; Linebacker	Humble, TX	Summer Creek High School	6 ft 2 in (1.88 m)	228 lb (103 kg)	Aug 17, 2013
Dakota Allen; Linebacker	Recruit ratings: Scout: Rivals: 247Sports: ESPN:				
Connor Wilson; Defensive back	Argyle, TX	Argyle High School	6 ft 2 in (1.88 m)	205 lb (93 kg)	Sep 18, 2013
Connor Wilson; Defensive back	Recruit ratings: Scout: Rivals: 247Sports: ESPN:				
Payton Hendrix; Defensive back	Dallas, TX	Bishop Dunne Catholic School	6 ft 3 in (1.91 m)	191 lb (87 kg)	Dec 27, 2013
Payton Hendrix; Defensive back	Recruit ratings: Scout: Rivals: 247Sports: ESPN:				
Nigel Bethel II; Defensive back	Miami, FL	Booker T. Washington High School	5 ft 8 in (1.73 m)	168 lb (76 kg)	Jan 10, 2014
Nigel Bethel II; Defensive back	Recruit ratings: Scout: Rivals: 247Sports: ESPN:				
Michael Coley; Wide receiver	Irving, TX	Irving High School	6 ft 3 in (1.91 m)	185 lb (84 kg)	Feb 5, 2014
Michael Coley; Wide receiver	Recruit ratings: Scout: Rivals: 247Sports: ESPN:				

== Schedule ==
Date	Time	Opponent	Site	TV	Result	Attendance
August 30	6:00 pm	Central Arkansas*	Jones AT&T Stadium; Lubbock, TX	FSSW+	W 42–35	60,778
September 6	10:00 pm	at UTEP*	Sun Bowl; El Paso, TX	FS1	W 30–26	35,422
September 13	2:30 pm	Arkansas*	Jones AT&T Stadium; Lubbock, TX (rivalry)	ABC	L 28–49	60,277
September 25	6:30 pm	at No. 24 Oklahoma State	Boone Pickens Stadium; Stillwater, OK	ESPN	L 35–45	55,958
October 4	6:00 pm	at No. 23 Kansas State	Bill Snyder Family Football Stadium; Manhattan, KS	ESPNU	L 13–45	52,726
October 11	11:00 am	West Virginia	Jones AT&T Stadium; Lubbock, TX	FS1	L 34–37	58,502
October 18	2:30 pm	Kansas^{†}	Jones AT&T Stadium; Lubbock, TX	FSN	W 34–21	54,071
October 25	2:30 pm	at No. 10 TCU	Amon G. Carter Stadium; Fort Worth, TX (rivalry)	Fox	L 27–82	45,122
November 1	6:30 pm	Texas	Jones AT&T Stadium; Lubbock, TX (rivalry)	FS1	L 13–34	60,961
November 15	2:30 pm	Oklahoma	Jones AT&T Stadium; Lubbock, TX	ESPN	L 30–42	59,014
November 22	2:30 pm	at Iowa State	Jack Trice Stadium; Ames, IA	FSN	W 34–31	50,877
November 29	2:30 pm	vs. No. 7 Baylor	AT&T Stadium; Arlington, TX (rivalry)	ABC/ESPN2	L 46–48	54,179
*Non-conference game; ^{†}Homecoming; Rankings from AP Poll released prior to the game; All times are in Central time

== Personnel ==
2014 Texas Tech Red Raiders football team roster
Players
Coaches
Offense

Pos.	#	Name	Class
WR	2	Reginald Davis III	So
WR	4	Bradley Marquez	Sr
QB	5	Patrick Mahomes	Fr
WR	6	Devin Lauderdale	So
QB	7	Davis Webb	So
RB	8	Justin Stockton	Fr
WR	9	Shawn Corker	Sr
QB	10	Payne Sullins	Fr
WR	11	Jakeem Grant	Jr
WR	12	Ian Sadler	Fr
WR	14	Dylan Cantrell	So
QB	15	Hunter Rittimann	Fr
QB	16	Vincent Testaverde Jr.	Fr
WR	18	Jakari Dillard	Fr
RB	21	DeAndré Washington	Jr
RB	26	Kenneth Huggins	Jr
RB	27	Demarcus Felton	Fr
WR	28	Dominique Wheeler	So
RB	29	Mason Reed	Fr
WR	33	Stanton Keane	Fr
RB	34	Kenny Williams	Sr
RB	35	Tyler Scalzi	So
RB	37	Quinton White Jr.	So
WR	38	Ja'Deion High	Fr
RB	40	Rodney Hall	Sr
OL	51	Tony Morales	Jr
OL	56	Alfredo Morales	Jr
OL	58	Josh Outlaw	Fr
OL	61	Emiliano Renteria	So
OL	62	Le'Raven Clark	Jr
OL	63	James Polk	Sr
OL	65	Baylen Brown	So
OL	68	Hayden Vinson	So
OL	71	Reshod Fortenberry	So
OL	72	Robert Castaneda	Fr
OL	73	Justin Murphy	Fr
OL	74	Cole Collier	Fr
OL	75	Jared Kaster	Jr
OL	79	Poet Thomas	Fr
WR	80	Cameron Batson	Fr
WR	81	Brent Mitcham	Sr
WR	83	Brad Pearson	Jr
WR	84	Zach Austin	Fr
WR	85	Jordan Davis	Sr
WR	87	Kash Knutson	Fr
OL, TE	97	Trey Keenan	So

Defense

Pos.	#	Name	Class
DB	1	Nigel Bethel II	Fr
DB	3	J. J. Gaines	Jr
DL	5	Gary Moore	Fr
LB	6	Kris Williams	So
DB	7	D. J. Polite-Bray	So
DB	8	Austin Stewart	Sr
DL	9	Branden Jackson	Jr
LB	10	Pete Robinson	Jr
LB	11	Jacarthy Mack	Fr
DL	12	Zach Barnes	So
LB	13	Sam Eguavoen	Sr
DB	15	Keenon Ward	So
DB	16	Dorian Crawford	Sr
DB	17	Thierry Nguema	So
LB	18	Micah Awe	Jr
DB	19	Jalen Barnes	Fr
DB	20	Tevin Madison	Fr
DB	21	Michael Coley	Fr
S	22	Derrick Nixon	Fr
DB	23	La'Darius Newbold	So
S	24	Payton Hendrix	Fr
S	25	Sam Atoe	Jr
DB	26	John White	Jr
LB	27	Zach Winbush	Sr
DB	28	Martin Hill	Sr
DB	29	Jah'Shawn Johnson	Fr
LB	30	Collin Bowen	Fr
DB	31	Justis Nelson	So
DB	32	Brandon Bagley	Jr
LB	33	Chris Payne	Sr
LB	37	Bobby Esiaba	Jr
S	38	Kisean Allen	Fr
LB	39	Kahlee Woods	Fr
LB	40	Dakota Allen	Fr
LB	41	Malik Jenkins	So
LB	42	Mike Mitchell	Fr
DL	43	Jackson Richards	Sr
LB	47	Brendan Marusak	Fr
DL	50	Brandon Thorpe	Jr
DL	51	Demetrius Alston	Jr
LB	52	V. J. Fehoko	Sr
LB	54	Grant Bouma	Fr
LB	59	Talor Nunez	Fr
DB	89	Caleb Woodward	Fr
DL	90	Keland McElrath	Jr
LB	92	Andre Ross	Jr
DL	94	Donte Phillips	Jr
DL	95	Marcus Smith	Jr
DL	98	Anthony Smith	So
DL	99	Rika Levi	Jr

Special teams

Pos.	#	Name	Class
K	42	Taylor Symmank	Jr
K	45	Kramer Fyfe	Sr
DS	46	David Brenner	Jr
K	48	Ryan Bustin	Sr
DS	53	Kyle Heffron	Fr
K	96	Clayton Hatfield	Fr

Head coach

- Kliff Kingsbury

Coordinators/assistant coaches

- Eric Morris
  Offensive coordinator
- Mike Smith
  Interim defensive coordinator/Outside linebackers
- Darrin Chiaverini
  Special teams coordinator/Outside receivers
- Kevin Curtis
  Defensive backs
- Trey Haverty
  Outside linebackers
- Lee Hays
  Offensive line
- Mike Jinks
  Running backs
- John Scott Jr.
  Defensive line
- Matt Brock
  Inside linebackers

Legend

- (C) Team captain
- (S) Suspended
- (I) Ineligible
- Injured
- Redshirt

Roster
Last update: August 12, 2024

== Game summaries ==
=== Central Arkansas ===
Central Arkansas Bears at Texas Tech Red Raiders – Game summary

Quarter	1	2	3	4	Total
Bears	3	13	5	14	35
Red Raiders	7	14	7	14	42

at Jones AT&T Stadium, Lubbock, Texas

- Date: August 30
- Game time: 6:00 p.m. CDT
- Game weather: 93 °F (34 °C) • Wind: SE 12 • Weather: Partly cloudy
- Game attendance: 60,778
- Referee: Alan Eck
- TV announcers (FSSW+): Mark Followill, Brian Baldinger, and Lesley McCaslin
- Box score, Recap

Game information
First quarter
- UCA – Jace Denker 28-yard field goal, 7:41. Bears 3–0. Drive: 18 plays, 58 yards, 5:11.
- TTU – DeAndré Washington 1-yard run (Ryan Bustin kick), 5:13. Red Raiders 7–3. Drive: 10 plays, 43 yards, 2:28.

Second quarter

- UCA – Taylor Reed 1-yard run (Jace Denker kick), 11:43. Bears 10–7. Drive: 12 plays, 80 yards, 3:29.
- UCA – Willie Matthews 2-yard run (pass failed), 10:38. Bears 16–7. Drive: 1 play, 2 yards, 0:06.
- TTU – Jordan Davis 6-yard pass from Davis Webb (Ryan Bustin kick), 7:16. Bears 16–14. Drive: 11 plays, 63 yards, 3:22.
- TTU – Justin Stockton 6-yard run (Ryan Bustin kick), 3:34. Red Raiders 21–16. Drive: 6 plays, 63 yards, 1:22.

Third quarter

- TTU – Reginald Davis 5-yard pass from Davis Webb (Ryan Bustin kick), 11:05. Red Raiders 28–16. Drive: 11 plays, 68 yards, 3:55.
- UCA – Jace Denker 34-yard field goal, 6:36. Red Raiders 28–19. Drive: 14 plays, 52 yards, 4:29.
- UCA – Davis Webb intentional grounding in end zone, 6:20. Red Raiders 28–21.

Fourth quarter

- TTU – Bradley Marquez 70-yard pass from Davis Webb (Ryan Bustin kick), 12:58. Red Raiders 35–21. Drive: 3 plays, 85 yards, 0:53.
- UCA – Blake Veasley 1-yard run (Jace Denker kick), 7:47. Red Raiders 35–28. Drive: 15 plays, 75 yards, 5:11.
- TTU – Bradley Marquez 27-yard pass from Davis Webb (Ryan Bustin kick), 5:38. Red Raiders 42–28. Drive: 8 plays, 79 yards, 2:09.
- UCA – Damien Watts 8-yard pass from Ryan Howard (Jace Denker kick), 2:57. Red Raiders 42–35. Drive: 9 plays, 87 yards, 2:41.

Statistics	UCA	TTU
First downs	28	25
Total yards	406	636
Rushing yards	178	184
Passing yards	228	452
Turnovers	0	2
Time of possession	33:36	26:24

Team	Category	Player	Statistics
Central Arkansas	Passing	Taylor Reed	20/34, 149 yards
Central Arkansas	Rushing	Willie Matthews	21 rushes, 96 yards, TD
Central Arkansas	Receiving	Dezmin Lewis	7 receptions, 105 yards
Texas Tech	Passing	Davis Webb	39/52, 452 yards, 4 TD, 2 INT
Texas Tech	Rushing	DeAndré Washington	20 rushes, 104 yards, TD
Texas Tech	Receiving	Bradley Marquez	11 receptions, 184 yards, 2 TD

The Texas Tech Red Raiders opened up their 2014 season at home with a 42–35 win over the Central Arkansas Bears. The Red Raiders committed 15 penalties during the game, but still gained a total of 636 yards against the Bears' 406. After two Webb interceptions, the Bears scored to take a 16–7 lead in the 2nd quarter. After receiving an onside kick with 3 minutes left in the game, the Red Raiders held onto the ball to end the game.

Davis Webb threw for 452 yards and four touchdowns during the season opener.

=== At UTEP ===
Texas Tech Red Raiders at UTEP Miners – Game summary

Quarter	1	2	3	4	Total
Red Raiders	0	16	7	7	30
Miners	6	7	6	7	26

at Sun Bowl Stadium, El Paso, Texas

- Date: September 6
- Game time: 10:00 p.m. CDT/9:00 p.m. MDT
- Game attendance: 35,442
- Referee: Wayne Winkler
- TV announcers (FS1): Craig Bolerjack and Ryan Nece
- Box score, Recap

Game information
First quarter
- UTEP – Jay Mattox 22-yard field goal, 9:44. Miners 3–0. Drive: 11 plays, 67 yards, 4:52.
- UTEP – Jay Mattox 27-yard field goal, 0:00. Miners 6–0. Drive: 8 plays, 44 yards, 2:11.

Second quarter

- TTU – Justin Stockton 75-yard run (run failed), 14:48. Tied 6–6. Drive: 1 play, 75 yards, 0:12.
- TTU – Ryan Bustin 28-yard field goal, 10:47. Red Raiders 9–6. Drive: 7 plays, 54 yards, 2:36.
- UTEP – Aaron Jones 19-yard run (Jay Mattox kick), 4:43. Miners 13–9. Drive: 10 plays, 75 yards, 6:04.
- TTU – Bradley Marquez 11-yard pass from Davis Webb (Ryan Bustin kick), 2:41. Red Raiders 16–13. Drive: 7 plays, 75 yards, 2:02.

Third quarter

- TTU – Bradley Marquez 13-yard pass from Davis Webb (Ryan Bustin kick), 6:27. Red Raiders 23–13. Drive: 9 plays, 83 yards, 3:52.
- UTEP – Jeremiah Laufasa 24-yard run (kick failed), 0:07. Red Raiders 23–19. Drive: 13 plays, 75 yards, 6:20.

Fourth quarter

- UTEP – Aaron Jones 9-yard run (Jay Mattox kick), 5:05. Miners 26–23. Drive: 11 plays, 88 yards, 5:43.
- TTU – Bradley Marquez 9-yard pass from Davis Webb (Ryan Bustin kick), 2:32. Red Raiders 30–26. Drive: 7 plays, 75 yards, 2:33.

Statistics	TTU	UTEP
First downs	20	24
Total yards	504	393
Rushing yards	226	277
Passing yards	278	116
Turnovers	1	0
Time of possession	21:00	39:00

Team	Category	Player	Statistics
Texas Tech	Passing	Davis Webb	17/31, 278 yards, 3 TD
Texas Tech	Rushing	Justin Stockton	8 rushes, 135 yards, TD
Texas Tech	Receiving	Jakeem Grant	8 receptions, 150 yards
UTEP	Passing	Jameill Showers	9/25, 116 yards
UTEP	Rushing	Aaron Jones	23 rushes, 147 yards, 2 TD
UTEP	Receiving	Jarrad Shaw	3 receptions, 43 yards

Despite only gaining 20 first downs against the Miners' 24 and possessing the ball for 21 minutes, Texas Tech managed to edge out UTEP for a 30–26 win.

=== Arkansas ===
Arkansas Razorbacks at Texas Tech Red Raiders – Game summary

Quarter	1	2	3	4	Total
Razorbacks	14	14	7	14	49
Red Raiders	7	14	7	0	28

at Jones AT&T Stadium, Lubbock, Texas

- Date: September 13
- Game time: 2:30 p.m. CDT
- Game weather: 54 °F (12 °C) • Wind: SE 6 • Weather: Cloudy
- Game attendance: 60,277
- Referee: Ken Williamson
- TV announcers (ABC): Mike Patrick, Ed Cunningham, and Jeannine Edwards
- Box score, Recap

Game information
First quarter
- TTU – Reginald Davis 15-yard pass from Davis Webb (Ryan Bustin kick), 12:58. Red Raiders 7–0. Drive: 4 plays, 31 yards, 1:18.
- ARK – Jonathan Williams 6-yard run (John Henson kick), 8:36. Tied 7–7. Drive: 2 plays, 13 yards, 0:37.
- ARK – Jonathan Williams 13-yard run (John Henson kick), 1:26. Razorbacks 14–7. Drive: 11 plays, 68 yards, 6:22.

Second quarter

- TTU – D. J. Polite-Bray 3-yard pass from Davis Webb (Ryan Bustin kick), 13:04. Tied 14–14. Drive: 12 plays, 75 yards, 3:22.
- ARK – Alex Collins 15-yard run (John Henson kick), 11:15. Razorbacks 21–14. Drive: 5 plays, 71 yards, 1:49.
- TTU – Davis Webb 3-yard run (Ryan Bustin kick), 6:45. Tied 21–21. Drive: 11 plays, 67 yards, 4:30.
- ARK – Jonathan Williams 12-yard run (John Henson kick), 1:30. Razorbacks 28–21. Drive: 1 play, 12 yards, 0:06.

Third quarter

- ARK – Brandon Allen 5-yard run (John Henson kick), 7:57. Razorbacks 35–21. Drive: 13 plays, 75 yards, 7:03.
- TTU – Jakeem Grant 39-yard pass from Davis Webb (Ryan Bustin kick), 5:42. Razorbacks 35–28. Drive: 8 plays, 79 yards, 2:15.

Fourth quarter

- ARK – Jonathan Williams 7-yard run (John Henson kick), 13:59. Razorbacks 42–28. Drive: 13 plays, 82 yards, 6:43.
- ARK – Alex Collins 84-yard run (John Henson kick), 10:56. Razorbacks 49–28. Drive: 2 plays, 85 yards, 0:59.

Statistics	ARK	TTU
First downs	32	20
Total yards	499	353
Rushing yards	438	101
Passing yards	61	252
Turnovers	2	3
Time of possession	40:39	19:21

Team	Category	Player	Statistics
Arkansas	Passing	Brandon Allen	6/12, 61 yards
Arkansas	Rushing	Alex Collins	27 rushes, 212 yards, 2 TD
Arkansas	Receiving	Keon Hatcher	2 receptions, 22 yards
Texas Tech	Passing	Davis Webb	27/45, 252 yards, 3 TD, 2 INT
Texas Tech	Rushing	DeAndré Washington	8 rushes, 51 yards
Texas Tech	Receiving	Jakeem Grant	6 receptions, 85 yards, TD

The Red Raiders lost their first game of the season against former Southwest Conference rivals, the Arkansas Razorbacks. The Raiders were plagued by both turnovers and penalties and couldn't keep up with Arkansas's run game. Texas Tech was 5–60 on penalties, while Arkansas was only 2–15. The Razorbacks managed to rush for 438 yards, while the Red Raiders only ran for 101.

=== At No. 24 Oklahoma State ===
Texas Tech Red Raiders at No. 24 Oklahoma State Cowboys – Game summary

Quarter	1	2	3	4	Total
Red Raiders	7	7	14	7	35
No. 24 Cowboys	7	14	14	10	45

at Boone Pickens Stadium, Stillwater, Oklahoma

- Date: September 25
- Game time: 6:30 p.m. CDT
- Game weather: 81 °F (27 °C) • Wind: SE 8 • Weather: Partly cloudy
- Game attendance: 55,958
- Referee: Mike Defee
- TV announcers (ESPN): Rece Davis, David Pollack, Jesse Palmer, and Samantha Ponder
- Box score, Recap

Game information
First quarter
- TTU – Reginald Davis 21-yard pass from Davis Webb (Ryan Bustin kick), 11:15. Red Raiders 7–0. Drive: 10 plays, 83 yards, 3:45.
- OKST – James Washington 33-yard pass from Daxx Garman (Ben Grogan kick), 1:48. Tied 7–7. Drive: 4 plays, 80 yards, 0:59.

Second quarter

- TTU – Bradley Marquez 18-yard pass from Davis Webb (Ryan Bustin kick), 12:01. Red Raiders 14–7. Drive: 8 plays, 52 yards, 1:59.
- OKST – Desmond Roland 1-yard run (Ben Grogan kick), 7:00. Tied 14–14. Drive: 4 plays, 61 yards, 0:48.
- OKST – James Washington 39-yard pass from Daxx Garman (Ben Grogan kick), 5:29. Cowboys 21–14. Drive: 1 play, 39 yards, 0:08.

Third quarter

- OKST – Blake Jarwin 47-yard pass from Daxx Garman (Ben Grogan kick), 10:07. Cowboys 28–14. Drive: 5 plays, 92 yards, 1:09.
- TTU – Justin Stockton 17-yard pass from Davis Webb (Ryan Bustin kick), 8:37. Cowboys 28–21. Drive: 4 plays, 44 yards, 1:30.
- OKST – Tyreek Hill 50-yard pass from Daxx Garman (Ben Grogan kick), 7:34. Cowboys 35–21. Drive: 4 plays, 75 yards, 1:03.
- TTU – Reginald Davis 22-yard pass from Davis Webb (Ryan Bustin kick), 5:06. Cowboys 35–28. Drive: 7 plays, 80 yards, 2:28.

Fourth quarter

- OKST – Ben Grogan 42-yard field goal, 14:55. Cowboys 38–28. Drive: 13 plays, 47 yards, 5:11.
- OKST – Daxx Garman 8-yard run (Ben Grogan kick), 7:39. Cowboys 45–28. Drive: 4 plays, 15 yards, 2:05.
- TTU – Jakeem Grant 4-yard pass from Patrick Mahomes (Ryan Bustin kick), 5:52. Cowboys 45–35. Drive: 5 plays, 48 yards, 1:47.

Statistics	TTU	OKST
First downs	32	22
Total yards	512	528
Rushing yards	118	158
Passing yards	394	370
Turnovers	3	2
Time of possession	31:51	28:09

Team	Category	Player	Statistics
Texas Tech	Passing	Davis Webb	35/54, 374 yards, 4 TD, 2 INT
Texas Tech	Rushing	DeAndré Washington	13 rushes, 85 yards
Texas Tech	Receiving	Bradley Marquez	8 receptions, 106 yards, TD
Oklahoma State	Passing	Daxx Garman	17/31, 370 yards, 4 TD, 2 INT
Oklahoma State	Rushing	Desmond Roland	23 rushes, 86 yards, TD
Oklahoma State	Receiving	Marcell Ateman	6 receptions, 130 yards

=== At No. 23 Kansas State ===
Texas Tech Red Raiders at No. 23 Kansas State Wildcats – Game summary

Quarter	1	2	3	4	Total
Red Raiders	0	7	0	6	13
No. 23 Wildcats	7	17	7	14	45

at Bill Snyder Family Football Stadium, Manhattan, Kansas

- Date: October 4
- Game time: 6:00 p.m CDT
- Game weather: Temperature: 63 °F (17 °C) • Wind: W 9 • Weather: Partly cloudy
- Game attendance: 52,726
- Referee: Greg Burks
- TV announcers (ESPNU): Clay Matvick, Anthony Becht, and Cara Capuano
- Box score, Recap

Game information
First quarter
- KSU – Curry Sexton 48-yard pass from Jake Walters (Matthew McCrane kick), 7:18. Wildcats 7–0. Drive: 8 plays, 80 yards, 3:57.

Second quarter

- KSU – Jake Walters 4-yard run (Matthew McCrane kick), 11:31. Wildcats 14–0. Drive: 6 plays, 69 yards, 2:30.
- KSU – Matthew McCrane 27-yard field goal, 6:12. Wildcats 17–0. Drive: 8 plays, 51 yards, 4:26.
- TTU – Jakeem Grant 22-yard pass from Davis Webb (Ryan Bustin kick), 4:11. Wildcats 17–7. Drive: 5 plays, 74 yards, 2:01.
- KSU – Tyler Lockett 15-yard pass from Jake Walters (Matthew McCrane kick), 0:21. Wildcats 24–7. Drive: 7 plays, 59 yards, 1:36.

Third quarter

- KSU – Tyler Lockett 14-yard pass from Jake Walters (Matthew McCrane kick), 4:14. Wildcats 31–7. Drive: 8 plays, 66 yards, 4:00.

Fourth quarter

- TTU – Jakeem Grant 19-yard pass from Davis Webb (pass failed), 14:50. Wildcats 31–13. Drive: 7 plays, 57 yards, 1:18.
- KSU – Curry Sexton 3-yard pass from Jake Walters (Matthew McCrane kick), 11:10. Wildcats 38–13. Drive: 8 plays, 66 yards, 3:40.
- KSU – DeMarcus Robinson 2-yard run (Jack Cantele kick), 3:14. Wildcats 45–13. Drive: 12 plays, 62 yards, 7:21.

Statistics	TTU	KSU
First downs	20	29
Total yards	347	535
Rushing yards	46	245
Passing yards	301	290
Turnovers	4	1
Time of possession	19:51	40:09

Team	Category	Player	Statistics
Texas Tech	Passing	Davis Webb	22/43, 247 yards, 2 TD, 4 INT
Texas Tech	Rushing	DeAndré Washington	7 rushes, 27 yards
Texas Tech	Receiving	Jakeem Grant	7 receptions, 90 yards, 2 TD
Kansas State	Passing	Jake Waters	24/31, 290 yards, 4 TD
Kansas State	Rushing	Jake Waters	17 rushes, 105 yards, TD
Kansas State	Receiving	Curry Sexton	9 receptions, 128 yards, 2 TD

=== West Virginia ===
West Virginia Mountaineers at Texas Tech Red Raiders – Game summary

Quarter	1	2	3	4	Total
Mountaineers	3	7	10	17	37
Red Raiders	14	7	6	7	34

at Jones AT&T Stadium, Lubbock, Texas

- Date: October 11
- Game time: 11:00 a.m. CDT
- Game weather: Temperature: 50 °F (10 °C) • Wind: NNE 14 • Weather: Cloudy
- Game attendance: 58,502
- Referee: Reggie Smith
- TV announcers (FS1): Joe Davis, Joey Harrington, and Kris Budden
- Box score, Recap

Game information
First quarter
- WVU – Josh Lambert 42-yard field goal, 10:42. Mountaineers 3–0. Drive: 12 plays, 43 yards, 4:18.
- TTU – Devin Lauderdale 34-yard pass from Davis Webb (Ryan Bustin kick), 3:05. Red Raiders 7–3. Drive: 8 plays, 74 yards, 3:05.
- TTU – Devin Lauderdale 76-yard pass from Davis Webb (Ryan Bustin kick), 1:14. Red Raiders 14–3. Drive: 2 plays, 70 yards, 1:05.

Second quarter

- WVU – Rushell Shell 12-yard run (Josh Lambert kick), 13:42. Red Raiders 14–10. Drive: 9 plays, 75 yards, 2:32.
- TTU – Jakeem Grant 43-yard pass from Davis Webb (Ryan Bustin kick), 11:13. Red Raiders 21–10. Drive: 6 plays, 76 yards, 2:29.

Third quarter

- WVU – Josh Lambert 38-yard field goal, 8:03. Red Raiders 21–13. Drive: 12 plays, 44 yards, 3:29.
- TTU – Ryan Bustin 21-yard field goal, 5:01. Red Raiders 24–13. Drive: 12 plays, 71 yards, 3:02.
- TTU – Ryan Bustin 25-yard field goal, 2:22. Red Raiders 27–13. Drive: 7 plays, 29 yards, 1:48.
- WVU – Jordan Thompson 56-yard pass from Clint Trickett (Josh Lambert kick), 1:58. Red Raiders 27–20. Drive: 2 plays, 65 yards, 0:24.

Fourth quarter

- TTU – Justin Stockton 69-yard run (Ryan Bustin kick), 7:32. Red Raiders 34–20. Drive: 5 plays, 84 yards, 1:05.
- WVU – Kevin White 26-yard pass from Clint Trickett (Josh Lambert kick), 5:55. Red Raiders 34–27. Drive: 7 plays, 75 yards, 1:37.
- WVU – Rushel Shell 1-yard run (Josh Lambert kick), 2:02. Tied 34–34. Drive: 7 plays, 78 yards, 2:37.
- WVU – Josh Lambert 55-yard field goal, 0:00. Mountaineers 37–34. Drive: 8 plays, 42 yards, 0:52.

Statistics	WVU	TTU
First downs	29	24
Total yards	550	565
Rushing yards	249	217
Passing yards	301	348
Turnovers	1	1
Time of possession	30:13	29:47

Team	Category	Player	Statistics
West Virginia	Passing	Clint Trickett	28/44, 301 yards, 2 TD
West Virginia	Rushing	Wendell Smallwood	15 rushes, 123 yards
West Virginia	Receiving	Kevin White	13 receptions, 123 yards, TD
Texas Tech	Passing	Davis Webb	28/46, 348 yards, 3 TD, INT
Texas Tech	Rushing	DeAndré Washington	29 rushes, 132 yards
Texas Tech	Receiving	Devin Lauderdale	3 receptions, 112 yards, 2 TD

=== Kansas ===
Kansas Jayhawks at Texas Tech Red Raiders – Game summary

Quarter	1	2	3	4	Total
Jayhawks	0	7	14	0	21
Red Raiders	10	7	10	7	34

at Jones AT&T Stadium, Lubbock, Texas

- Date: October 18
- Game time: 2:30 p.m. CDT
- Game weather: Temperature: 62 °F (17 °C) • Wind: E 8 MPH • Weather: cloudy
- Game attendance: 54,071
- Referee: Randy Christal
- TV announcers (FSN): Mark Followill, Brian Baldinger, and Lesley McCaslin
- Box score, Recap

Game information
First quarter
- TTU – Ryan Bustin 34-yard field goal, 12:53. Red Raiders 3–0. Drive: 6 plays, 58 yards, 2:07.
- TTU – Reginald Davis 13-yard pass from Davis Webb (Ryan Bustin kick), 2:30. Red Raiders 10–0. Drive: 12 plays, 66 yards, 3:15.

Second quarter

- TTU – Bradley Marquez 8-yard pass from Davis Webb (Ryan Bustin kick), 6:57. Red Raiders 17–0. Drive: 9 plays, 90 yards, 3:00.
- KU – Justin McCay 16-yard pass from Michael Cummings (Matthew Wyman kick), 0:31. Red Raiders 17–7. Drive: 7 plays, 39 yards, 2:21.

Third quarter

- TTU – Ryan Bustin 38-yard field goal, 11:11. Red Raiders 20–7. Drive: 7 plays, 23 yards, 1:53.
- KU – Jimmay Mundine 21-yard pass from Michael Cummings (Matthew Wyman kick), 8:34. Red Raiders 20–14. Drive: 2 plays, 27 yards, 0:43.
- TTU – Ian Sadler 6-yard pass from Davis Webb (Ryan Bustin kick), 5:10. Red Raiders 27–14. Drive: 9 plays, 63 yards, 3:24.
- KU – Michael Cummings 1-yard run (Matthew Wyman kick), 0:03. Red Raiders 27–21. Drive: 7 plays, 81 yards, 2:36.

Fourth quarter

- TTU – Justin Stockton 21-yard run (Ryan Bustin kick), 13:21. Red Raiders 34–21. Drive: 6 plays, 72 yards, 1:42.

Statistics	KU	TTU
First downs	19	26
Total yards	363	507
Rushing yards	128	219
Passing yards	235	288
Turnovers	2	2
Time of possession	29:52	30:08

Team	Category	Player	Statistics
Kansas	Passing	Michael Cummings	20/32, 235 yards, 2 TD, INT
Kansas	Rushing	Corey Avery	15 rushes, 69 yards
Kansas	Receiving	Jimmay Mundine	7 receptions, 82 yards, TD
Texas Tech	Passing	Davis Webb	28/44, 288 yards, 3 TD, INT
Texas Tech	Rushing	DeAndré Washington	23 rushes, 164 yards
Texas Tech	Receiving	Jakeem Grant	6 receptions, 72 yards

=== At No. 10 TCU ===
Texas Tech Red Raiders at No. 10 TCU Horned Frogs – Game summary

Quarter	1	2	3	4	Total
Red Raiders	17	3	7	0	27
No. 10 Horned Frogs	24	13	31	14	82

at Amon G. Carter Stadium, Fort Worth, Texas

- Date: October 25
- Game time: 2:30 p.m. CDT
- Game weather: 88 °F (31 °C) • Wind: SW 8 MPH • Weather: Sunny and clear
- Game attendance: 45,122
- Referee: Dan Romeo
- TV announcers (Fox): Joe Davis, Joey Harrington, and Kris Budden
- Box score, Recap

Game information
First quarter
- TTU – Kenny Williams 57-yard pass from Davis Webb (Ryan Bustin kick), 14:09. Red Raiders 7–0. Drive: 4 plays, 75 yards, 0:51.
- TCU – Aaron Green 62-yard run (Jaden Oberkrom kick), 13:46. Tied 7–7. Drive: 1 play, 77 yards, 0:23.
- TTU – Ryan Bustin 28-yard field goal, 11:48. Red Raiders 10–7. Drive: 6 plays, 64 yards, 1:58.
- TCU – Josh Doctson 51-yard pass from Trevone Boykin (Jaden Oberkrom kick), 9:54. Horned Frogs 14–10. Drive: 5 plays, 67 yards, 1:54.
- TCU – Jaden Oberkrom 45-yard field goal, 4:21. Horned Frogs 17–10. Drive: 8 plays, 71 yards, 2:10.
- TCU – Josh Doctson 5-yard pass from Trevone Boykin (Jaden Oberkrom kick), 2:04. Horned Frogs 24–10. Drive: 6 plays, 16 yards, 1:34.
- TTU – Devin Lauderdale 56-yard pass from Davis Webb (Ryan Bustin kick), 0:42. Horned Frogs 24–17. Drive: 6 plays, 95 yards, 1:22.

Second quarter

- TCU – Deante' Gray 24-yard pass from Trevone Boykin (Jaden Oberkrom kick), 12:42. Horned Frogs 31–17. Drive: 7 plays, 86 yards, 3:00.
- TTU – Ryan Bustin 38-yard field goal, 8:35. Horned Frogs 31–20. Drive: 11 plays, 54 yards, 4:07.
- TCU – Jaden Oberkrom 43-yard field goal, 0:48. Horned Frogs 34–20. Drive: 4 plays, -2 yards, 1:40.
- TCU – Jaden Oberkrom 47-yard field goal, 0:00. Horned Frogs 37–20. Drive: 4 plays, 0 yards, 0:25.

Third quarter

- TCU – Jaden Oberkrom 27-yard field goal, 12:00. Horned Frogs 40–20. Drive: 9 plays, 71 yards, 3:02.
- TCU – Cliff Murphy 8-yard pass from Trevone Boykin (Jaden Oberkrom kick), 11:14. Horned Frogs 47–20. Drive: 4 plays, 20 yards, 0:46.
- TCU – Deante' Gray 92-yard pass from Trevone Boykin (Jaden Oberkrom kick), 9:41. Horned Frogs 54–20. Drive: 2 plays, 92 yards, 0:25.
- TCU – Ty Slanina 57-yard pass from Trevone Boykin (Jaden Oberkrom kick), 7:51. Horned Frogs 61–20. Drive: 2 plays, 63 yards, 0:37.
- TTU – Dylan Cantrell 3-yard pass from Patrick Mahomes (Ryan Bustin kick), 3:13. Horned Frogs 61–27. Drive: 13 plays, 75 yards, 4:38.
- TCU – Emanuel Porter 12-yard pass from Trevone Boykin (Jaden Oberkrom kick), 1:14. Horned Frogs 68–27. Drive: 4 plays, 74 yards, 1:59.

Fourth quarter

- TCU – Trevorris Johnson 4-yard run (Jaden Oberkrom kick), 10:09. Horned Frogs 75–27. Drive: 6 plays, 48 yards, 2:33.
- TCU – Trevorris Johnson 25-yard run (Jaden Oberkrom kick), 1:16. Horned Frogs 82–27. Drive: 11 plays, 82 yards, 7:18.

Statistics	TTU	TCU
First downs	21	32
Total yards	446	785
Rushing yards	101	305
Passing yards	345	480
Turnovers	4	0
Time of possession	24:57	34:08

Team	Category	Player	Statistics
Texas Tech	Passing	Davis Webb	15/30, 300 yards, 2 TD, INT
Texas Tech	Rushing	DeAndré Washington	13 rushes, 77 yards
Texas Tech	Receiving	Devin Lauderdale	3 receptions, 81 yards, TD
TCU	Passing	Trevone Boykin	22/39, 433 yards, 7 TD
TCU	Rushing	Trevorris Johnson	10 rushes, 105 yards, 2 TD
TCU	Receiving	Deanté Gray	4 receptions, 165 yards, 2 TD

=== Texas ===
Texas Longhorns at Texas Tech Red Raiders – Game summary

Quarter	1	2	3	4	Total
Longhorns	3	14	3	14	34
Red Raiders	6	7	0	0	13

at Jones AT&T Stadium, Lubbock, Texas

- Date: November 1
- Game time: 6:30 p.m. CDT
- Game weather: Temperature: 65 °F (18 °C) • Wind: SSE 22 MPH • Weather: Partly cloudy
- Game attendance: 60,961
- Referee: Greg Burks
- TV announcers (FS1): Tim Brando and Brady Quinn
- Box score, Recap

Game information
First quarter
- TEX – Nick Rose 46-yard field goal, 11:31. Longhorns 3–0. Drive: 7 plays, 36 yards, 2:23.
- TTU – Branden Jackson fumble recovery in end zone (kick failed), 4:09. Red Raiders 6–3.

Second quarter

- TEX – Malcolm Brown 3-yard run (Nick Rose kick), 7:12. Longhorns 10–6. Drive: 5 plays, 25 yards, 2:09.
- TTU – Kenny Williams 6-yard run (Ryan Bustin kick), 3:34. Red Raiders 13–10. Drive: 9 plays, 75 yards, 3:38.
- TEX – Johnathan Gray 17-yard run (Nick Rose kick), 2:59. Longhorns 17–13. Drive: 2 plays, 85 yards, 0:35.

Third quarter

- TEX – Nick Rose 42-yard field goal, 12:02. Longhorns 20–13. Drive: 9 plays, 40 yards, 2:58.

Fourth quarter

- TEX – Jaxon Shipley 4-yard pass from Tyrone Swoopes (Nick Rose kick), 14:16. Longhorns 27–13. Drive: 9 plays, 89 yards, 3:52.
- TEX – Malcolm Brown 1-yard run (Nick Rose kick), 11:47. Longhorns 34–13. Drive: 5 plays, 61 yards, 1:30.

Statistics	TEX	TTU
First downs	21	18
Total yards	469	381
Rushing yards	241	156
Passing yards	228	225
Turnovers	2	2
Time of possession	30:45	29:15

Team	Category	Player	Statistics
Texas	Passing	Tyrone Swoopes	13/25, 228 yards, TD
Texas	Rushing	Malcolm Brown	22 rushes, 116 yards, 2 TD
Texas	Receiving	John Harris	5 receptions, 165 yards
Texas Tech	Passing	Vincent Testaverde Jr.	15/26, 116 yards, INT
Texas Tech	Rushing	DeAndré Washington	16 rushes, 97 yards
Texas Tech	Receiving	Bradley Marquez	6 receptions, 55 yards

=== No. 24 Oklahoma ===
No. 24 Oklahoma Sooners at Texas Tech Red Raiders – Game summary

Quarter	1	2	3	4	Total
No. 24 Sooners	0	7	14	21	42
Red Raiders	7	7	7	9	30

at Jones AT&T Stadium, Lubbock, Texas

- Date: November 15
- Game time: 2:30 p.m. CST
- Game weather: Temperature: 71 °F (22 °C) • Wind: W 19 MPH • Weather: Clear
- Game attendance: 59,014
- Referee: Mike Defee
- TV announcers (ESPN): Bob Wischusen, Matt Millen, and Quint Kessenich
- Box score, Recap

Game information
First quarter
- TTU – Jakeem Grant 6-yard pass from Patrick Mahomes (Ryan Bustin kick), 4:03. Red Raiders 7–0. Drive: 16 plays, 87 yards, 7:05.

Second quarter

- OKLA – Samaje Perine 2-yard run (Michael Hunnicutt kick), 4:41. Tied 7–7. Drive: 10 plays, 80 yards, 4:19.
- TTU – Ian Sadler 59-yard pass from Patrick Mahomes (Ryan Bustin kick), 3:17. Red Raiders 14–7. Drive: 4 plays, 72 yards, 1:24.

Third quarter

- TTU – Devin Lauderdale 47-yard pass from Patrick Mahomes (Ryan Bustin kick), 13:35. Red Raiders 21–7. Drive: 5 plays, 75 yards, 1:22.
- OKLA – Samaje Perine 64-yard run (Michael Hunnicutt kick), 12:04. Red Raiders 21–14. Drive: 4 plays, 75 yards, 1:34.
- OKLA – Durron Neal 3-yard pass from Cody Thomas (Michael Hunnicutt kick), 3:01. Tied 21–21. Drive: 9 plays, 87 yards, 5:23.

Fourth quarter

- TTU – Ryan Bustin 27-yard field goal, 14:11. Red Raiders 24–21. Drive: 10 plays, 65 yards, 3:50.
- OKLA – Cody Thomas 4-yard run (Michael Hunnicutt kick), 10:06. Sooners 28–24. Drive: 8 plays, 64 yards, 4:05.
- OKLA – Aaron Ripkowski 1-yard run (Michael Hunnicutt kick), 5:18. Sooners 35–24. Drive: 9 plays, 64 yards, 4:15.
- OKLA – Samaje Perrine 11-yard run (Michael Hunnicutt kick), 1:33. Sooners 42–24. Drive: 6 plays, 34 yards, 3:05.
- TTU – Dylan Cantrell 39-yard pass from Patrick Mahomes, 0:00. Sooners 42–30. Drive: 7 plays, 75 yards, 1:33.

Statistics	OKLA	TTU
First downs	25	23
Total yards	517	486
Rushing yards	384	93
Passing yards	133	393
Turnovers	3	0
Time of possession	32:40	27:20

Team	Category	Player	Statistics
Oklahoma	Passing	Cody Thomas	10/20, 133 yards, TD, 3 INT
Oklahoma	Rushing	Samaje Perine	25 rushes, 213 yards, 3 TD
Oklahoma	Receiving	Durron Neal	4 receptions, 57 yards, TD
Texas Tech	Passing	Patrick Mahomes	27/50, 393 yards, 4 TD
Texas Tech	Rushing	DeAndré Washington	12 rushes, 56 yards
Texas Tech	Receiving	Ian Sadler	4 receptions, 89 yards, TD

=== At Iowa State ===
Texas Tech Red Raiders at Iowa State Cyclones – Game summary

Quarter	1	2	3	4	Total
Red Raiders	14	0	13	7	34
Cyclones	7	10	7	7	31

at Jack Trice Stadium, Ames, Iowa

- Date: November 22
- Game time: 2:30 p.m. CST
- Game weather: Temperature: 54 °F (12 °C) • Wind: SW 5 MPH • Weather: Sunny
- Game attendance: 50,877
- Referee: Alan Eck
- TV announcers (FSN): Brendan Burke, Ben Leber, and Christian Steckel
- Box score, Recap

Game information
First quarter
- TTU – DeAndré Washington 26-yard pass from Patrick Mahomes (Ryan Bustin kick), 10:57. Red Raiders 7–0. Drive: 8 plays, 47 yards, 2:33.
- TTU – DeAndré Washington 72-yard run (Ryan Bustin kick), 5:47. Red Raiders 14–0. Drive: 2 plays, 84 yards, 0:31.
- ISU – E. J. Bibbs 13-yard pass from Sam B. Richardson (Cole Netten kick), 0:38. Red Raiders 14–7. Drive: 12 plays, 75 yards, 5:09.

Second quarter

- ISU – Tyler Brown 11-yard pass from Sam B. Richardson (Cole Netten kick), 9:29. Tied 14–14. Drive: 4 plays, 50 yards, 1:40.
- ISU – Cole Netten 22-yard field goal, 0:38. Cyclones 17–14. Drive: 16 plays, 91 yards, 4:04.

Third quarter

- ISU – Aaron Wimberly 2-yard run (Cole Netten kick), 10:57. Cyclones 24–14. Drive: 5 plays, 80 yards, 2:07.
- TTU – Devin Lauderdale 13-yard pass from Patrick Mahomes (kick failed), 8:30. Cyclones 24–20. Drive: 6 plays, 89 yards, 2:22.
- TTU – Devin Lauderdale 82-yard pass from Patrick Mahomes (Ryan Bustin kick), 4:17. Red Raiders 27–24. Drive: 2 plays, 87 yards, 0:30.

Fourth quarter

- ISU – Aaron Wimberly 3-yard run (Cole Netten kick), 13:44. Cyclones 31–27. Drive: 2 plays, 52 yards, 0:30.
- TTU – Kenny Williams 44-yard pass from Patrick Mahomes (Ryan Bustin kick), 4:07. Red Raiders 34–31. Drive: 7 plays, 75 yards, 1:33.

Statistics	TTU	ISU
First downs	27	27
Total yards	600	569
Rushing yards	272	265
Passing yards	328	304
Turnovers	2	1
Time of possession	25:57	33:31

Team	Category	Player	Statistics
Texas Tech	Passing	Patrick Mahomes	23/35, 328 yards, 4 TD, INT
Texas Tech	Rushing	DeAndré Washington	20 rushes, 186 yards, TD
Texas Tech	Receiving	Devin Lauderdale	2 receptions, 95 yards, 2 TD
Iowa State	Passing	Sam B. Richardson	24/38, 304 yards, 2 TD
Iowa State	Rushing	Aaron Wimberly	19 rushes, 102 yards, 2 TD
Iowa State	Receiving	Tad Ecby	2 receptions, 100 yards

=== Vs. No. 5 Baylor ===
No. 5 Baylor Bears vs. Texas Tech Red Raiders – Game summary

Quarter	1	2	3	4	Total
No. 5 Bears	7	21	17	3	48
Red Raiders	0	17	10	19	46

at AT&T Stadium, Arlington, Texas

- Date: November 29
- Game time: 2:30 p.m. CST
- Game weather: Temperature: 76 °F (24 °C) • Wind: SSW 17 MPH • Weather: Sunny (retractable roof open)
- Game attendance: 54,179
- Referee: Randy Christal
- TV announcers (ABC/ESPN2): Mark Jones, Rod Gilmore, and Jessica Mendoza
- Box score, Recap

Game information
First quarter
- BAY – Shock Linwood 8-yard run (Chris Callahan kick), 2:44. Bears 7–0. Drive: 6 plays, 59 yards, 1:50.

Second quarter

- TTU – Jakeem Grant 27-yard pass from Patrick Mahomes (Ryan Bustin kick), 13:12. Tied 7–7. Drive: 5 plays, 53 yards, 1:24.
- BAY – Johnny Jefferson 4-yard run (Chris Callahan kick), 11:50. Bears 14–7. Drive: 4 plays, 57 yards, 1:22.
- TTU – Ryan Bustin 40-yard field goal, 8:21. Bears 14–10. Drive: 11 plays, 58 yards, 3:29.
- BAY – Corey Coleman 28-yard pass from Bryce Petty (Chris Callahan kick), 7:58. Bears 21–10. Drive: 2 plays, 47 yards, 0:23.
- TTU – Bradley Marquez 5-yard pass from Patrick Mahomes (Ryan Bustin kick), 6:32. Bears 21–17. Drive: 6 plays, 71 yards, 1:26.
- BAY – Shock Linwood 3-yard run (Chris Callahan kick), 4:10. Bears 28–17. Drive: 6 plays, 81 yards, 2:22.

Third quarter

- BAY – Antwan Goodley 9-yard pass from Bryce Petty (Chris Callahan kick), 9:32. Bears 35–17. Drive: 9 plays, 32 yards, 3:23.
- BAY – Levi Norwood 27-yard pass from Bryce Petty (Chris Callahan kick), 6:44. Bears 42–17. Drive: 7 plays, 70 yards, 1:59.
- TTU – Ryan Bustin 25-yard field goal, 3:44. Bears 42–20. Drive: 9 plays, 71 yards, 3:00.
- BAY – Chris Callahan 38-yard field goal, 2:18. Bears 45–20. Drive: 5 plays, 57 yards, 1:26.
- TTU – Devin Lauderdale 48-yard pass from Patrick Mahomes (Ryan Bustin kick), 1:38. Bears 45–27. Drive: 3 plays, 68 yards, 0:40.

Fourth quarter

- TTU – Bradley Marquez 40-yard pass from Patrick Mahomes (Ryan Bustin kick), 11:39. Bears 45–34. Drive: 8 plays, 80 yards, 2:35.
- TTU – DeAndré Washington 49-yard pass from Patrick Mahomes (pass failed), 8:13. Bears 45–40. Drive: 4 plays, 85 yards, 1:05.
- BAY – Chris Callahan 36-yard field goal, 3:44. Bears 48–40. Drive: 13 plays, 56 yards, 4:29.
- TTU – Bradley Marquez 40-yard pass from Patrick Mahomes (run failed), 1:42. Bears 48–46. Drive: 5 plays, 73 yards, 2:02.

Statistics	BAY	TTU
First downs	37	31
Total yards	547	712
Rushing yards	255	103
Passing yards	292	609
Turnovers	1	4
Time of possession	33:29	26:31

Team	Category	Player	Statistics
Baylor	Passing	Bryce Petty	18/25, 210 yards, 2 TD
Baylor	Rushing	Shock Linwood	24 rushes, 158 yards, 2 TD
Baylor	Receiving	Levi Norwood	5 receptions, 63 yards, TD
Texas Tech	Passing	Patrick Mahomes	30/56, 598 yards, 6 TD, INT
Texas Tech	Rushing	DeAndré Washington	15 rushes, 65 yards
Texas Tech	Receiving	Jakeem Grant	5 receptions, 155 yards, TD

== Depth chart ==
Defense

FS
Keenon Ward
Jalen Barnes

WLB	ILB	ILB	SLB
Pete Robertson	VJ Fehoko	Sam Eguavoen	SLB_Starter
Andre Ross	Sam Atoe	Micah Awe	SLB_Backup

SS
JJ Gains
SS_Backup

CB
Justise Nelson
Thierry Nguema

DE	NT	DE
Brandon Jackson	Rika Levi	Jackson Richards
Demetrius Alston	Keland McElrath	Gary Moore

CB
Nigel Bethel III
Tevin Madison

Offense

WR
Bradley Marquez
Reginald Davis

WR
Jakeem Grant
Brent Mitcham

LT	LG	C	RG	RT
Le'Raven Clark	Alfredo Morales	Jared Kaster	Baylen Brown	Rashod Fortenberry
Justin Murphy	James Polk	Robert Castaneda	Trey Keenan	Poet Thomas

WR
Ian Sadler
Brad Pearson

WR
Dylan Cantrell
Devin Lauderdale

QB
Davis Webb
Patrick Mahomes II

RB
DeAndré Washington
Justin Stockton
