= Vincent Testaverde Jr. =

American football player (born 1996)

No. 2
- Position: Quarterback

Personal information
- Born: July 20, 1996 (age 30); Tampa, Florida, U.S.
- Listed height: 6 ft 1 in (1.85 m)
- Listed weight: 210 lb (95 kg)

Career information
- High school: Jesuit (Tampa)
- College: Texas Tech (2014); Miami (2015–2016); Albany (2017–2018)
- NFL draft: 2019: undrafted

Career history
- Tampa Bay Buccaneers (2019)*; Tampa Bay Vipers (2020)*; BC Lions (2020); Arizona Rattlers (2021–2022); Albany Empire (2023)*; Edmonton Elks (2023)*; St. Louis BattleHawks (2023); Orlando Predators (2024)
- * Offseason or practice squad member only
- Stats at CFL.ca

Vincent Frank Testaverde Jr. (born July 20, 1996) is an American former professional football player who was a quarterback. He played college football for the Texas Tech Red Raiders, Miami Hurricanes, and Albany Great Danes.

After going undrafted in the 2019 NFL draft, he signed with the Tampa Bay Buccaneers of the National Football League (NFL). He also had stints with the Tampa Bay Vipers and St. Louis Battlehawks of the XFL, BC Lions and Edmonton Elks of the Canadian Football League (CFL), Arizona Rattlers of the Indoor Football League (IFL), and the Albany Empire of the National Arena League (NAL). He is the son of former NFL quarterback Vinny Testaverde.

== Early life ==
The son of Vinny Testaverde, he was born on July 20, 1996, in Tampa, Florida. He grew up playing basketball and attended Jesuit High School; he played basketball before switching to football as a junior. He became the starting quarterback eight games into the season, being coached by his father (who was serving as quarterbacks coach), and remained starter as a senior while throwing for 1,015 yards and nine touchdowns.

== College career ==
=== Texas Tech ===
Following his graduation from Jesuit in 2013, Testaverde joined Texas Tech as a walk-on. He appeared in only one game for them, playing in their 34–13 loss to Texas after injuries to Patrick Mahomes and Davis Webb while completing 15 of 26 passes for 116 yards. After the season, he transferred to his father's alma mater, the University of Miami.

=== Miami ===
With Miami, Testaverde sat out the 2015 season with Miami as a redshirt. He battled for a backup position in 2016 but ended up only being a practice squad member. He left the program in August 2017.

=== Albany ===
Testaverde transferred to Albany prior to the 2017 season. Due to the NCAA transfer rules he had to sit out the season and spent the year as a member of the scout team. In 2018, he was named the team's starting quarterback for the season. Testaverde started a total of eight games on the year and recorded 1,714 passing yards and 11 touchdowns.

=== Statistics ===
| Year | Team | Games | | Passing | | | | | | | | Rushing | | | |
| Year | Team | GP | Record | Comp | Att | Pct | Yards | Avg | TD | Int | Rate | Att | Yards | Avg | TD |
|---|---|---|---|---|---|---|---|---|---|---|---|---|---|---|---|
| 2014 | Texas Tech | 1 | 0–0 | 15 | 26 | 57.7 | 116 | 4.5 | 0 | 1 | 87.5 | 1 | 0 | 0.0 | 0 |
| 2015 | Miami | DNP | | | | | | | | | | | | | |
| 2016 | Miami | DNP | | | | | | | | | | | | | |
| 2017 | Albany | DNP | | | | | | | | | | | | | |
| 2018 | Albany | 8 | 2–6 | 117 | 219 | 53.4 | 1,714 | 7.8 | 11 | 12 | 124.8 | 31 | −81 | −2.6 | 2 |
| Career | | 9 | 2–6 | 132 | 245 | 53.9 | 1,830 | 7.5 | 11 | 13 | 121.6 | 32 | -81 | -2.5 | 2 |

== Professional career ==
Pre-draft measurables
| Height | Weight | Arm length | Hand span |
|---|---|---|---|
| 6 ft 1 7/8 in (1.88 m) | 218 lb (99 kg) | 31 3/8 in (0.80 m) | 9 1/4 in (0.23 m) |
All values from Pro Day

=== Tampa Bay Buccaneers ===
After going unselected in the 2019 NFL draft, Testaverde was invited to the rookie tryout camp of the Tampa Bay Buccaneers and his performance there led to a contract. He was released in training camp but ended up being re-signed after an injury to backup Blaine Gabbert. He made his preseason debut in the finale against the Dallas Cowboys, playing most of the game and helping them to a 17–15 win. He was released afterwards.

=== Tampa Bay Vipers ===
Testaverde was selected in the 2020 XFL Open Draft by the Tampa Bay Vipers. He spent minicamp with them in December 2019 but did not make the team.

=== BC Lions ===
He was signed by the BC Lions of the Canadian Football League (CFL) in February 2020. However, the season was cancelled due to the COVID-19 pandemic.

=== Arizona Rattlers ===
Testaverde was signed by the Arizona Rattlers of the Indoor Football League (IFL) in April 2021. He suffered an injury in practice early during the season and spent the year being taught by eventual league MVP Drew Powell. He was re-signed for the 2022 season.

=== Albany Empire ===
Testaverde was signed by the Albany Empire of the National Arena League (NAL) for the 2023 season.

=== Edmonton Elks ===
Before the NAL season started, Testaverde joined the Edmonton Elks in the CFL on February 13, 2023. He was released by the Elks on March 29.

=== St. Louis BattleHawks ===
On April 13, 2023, Testaverde was signed to the St. Louis BattleHawks during week nine of the 2023 XFL season, following an injury to St. Louis's backup quarterback, Nick Tiano. He was not part of the roster after the 2024 UFL dispersal draft on January 15, 2024.

=== Orlando Predators ===
On February 26, 2024, Testaverde signed with the AFL's Orlando Predators.
