= Kurt Campbell (linebacker) =

Jamaican gridiron football player (born 1982)

No. 52, 49
- Position: Linebacker

Personal information
- Born: July 30, 1982 (age 44); Kingston, Jamaica
- Listed height: 6 ft 1 in (1.85 m)
- Listed weight: 227 lb (103 kg)

Career information
- College: Albany
- NFL draft: 2005: 7th round, 245th overall pick

Career history
- Green Bay Packers (2005–2006); Oakland Raiders (2007)*; Tennessee Titans (2007–2008)*; Calgary Stampeders (2009)*
- * Offseason or practice squad member only

Kurt Campbell (born July 30, 1982) is a former professional gridiron football linebacker. He was selected 245th overall by the Green Bay Packers in the seventh round of the 2005 NFL draft. He played college football at Albany.

Campbell was also a member of the Oakland Raiders, Tennessee Titans and Calgary Stampeders.
