= University Field (Albany) =

Multi-purpose stadium in Albany, New York

Coordinates: 42°40′59″N 73°49′37″W

- Interactive map of University Field
- Location: 1400 Washington Avenue; Albany, NY 12222
- Owner: University at Albany, SUNY
- Operator: University at Albany, SUNY
- Capacity: 10,000
- Surface: Natural Grass

Construction
- Groundbreaking: 1969
- Opened: 1970
- Demolished: 2012

Tenants
- Albany Great Danes (NCAA) (1970–2012; site remains in use for track)

University Field was a 10,000-seat multi-purpose stadium in Albany, New York. It was home to the University at Albany Great Danes football team from its opening in 1970 until 2012. The stadium was demolished after the football team's final game; after a major renovation to upgrade the site's track & field facilities, the site reopened in the fall of 2013 as the home for Albany's men's and women's teams in that sport.

In the spring of 2012, Albany began construction on a new 8,500-seat football stadium as part of a new sports complex on campus. The stadium, eventually known as Bob Ford Field, opened for the 2013 season, replacing University Field as the home of Great Danes football. It will be expandable to 24,000.
