= Albany Great Danes football =

Football team of the University at Albany

| 2026 Albany Great Danes football team |
- First season: 1922; 104 years ago (Note: The first fielded team only played three seasons (1922–1924), from 1925 through 1969 Albany did not have a football program. The modern era of Albany football began in 1970, when the school restored football as a club sport. The team was upgraded to full varsity status in 1973; 53 years ago.)
- Head coach: Tom Perkovich; 1st season, 0–0 (–)
- Location: Albany, New York
- Stadium: Bob Ford Field at Tom & Mary Casey Stadium (capacity: 8,500)
- NCAA division: Division I FCS
- Conference: CAA Football
- Colors: Purple and gold
- All-time record: 312–248 (.557)

Conference championships
- EFC: 1997, 1998, NEC: 2002, 2003, 2007, 2008, 2011, 2012, CAA: 2023
- Rivalries: Stony Brook (rivalry)
- Website: UAlbanySports.com

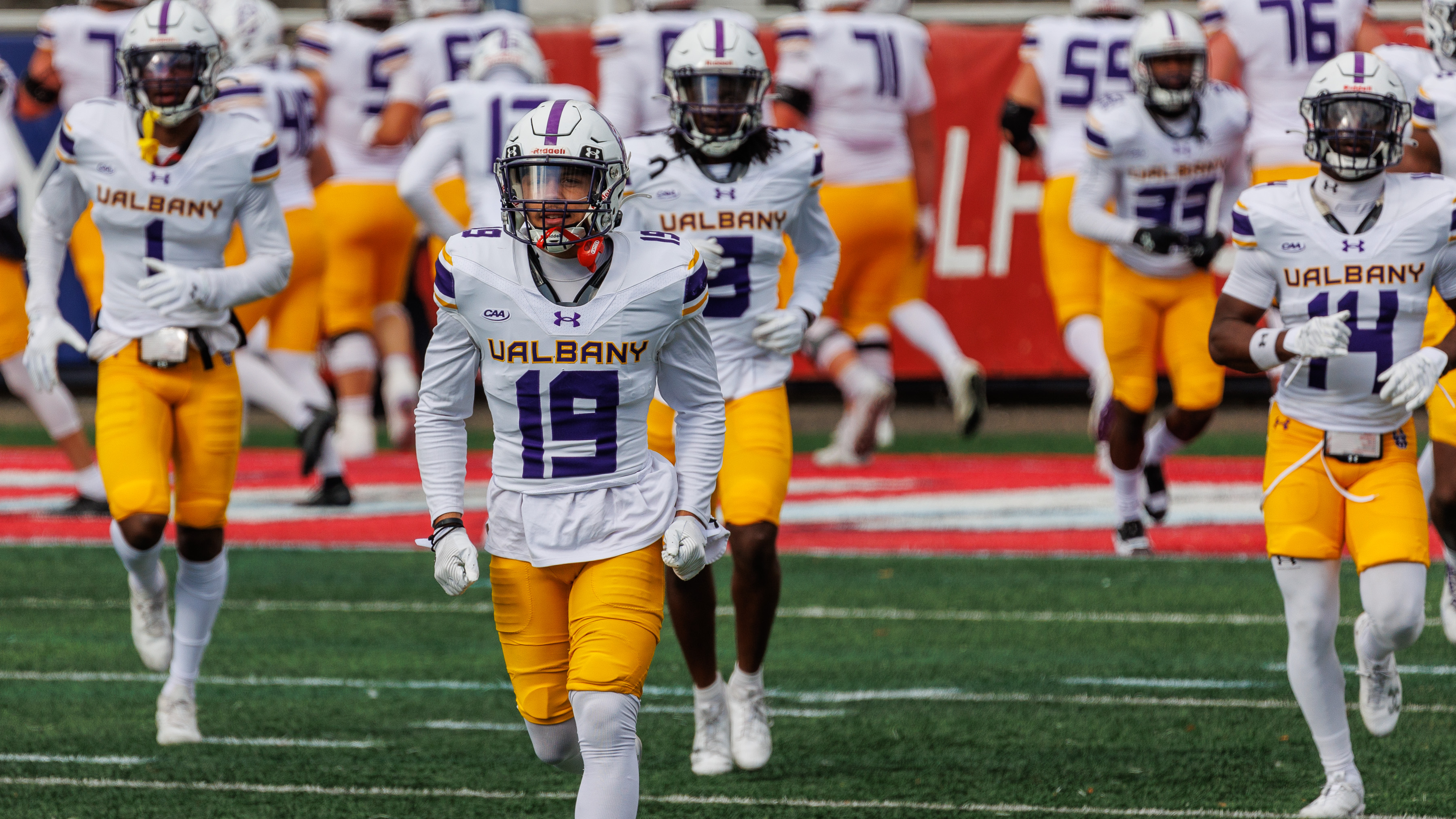
2023 Albany Great Danes football players

The Albany Great Danes football program is the intercollegiate American football team for the University at Albany located in the U.S. state of New York. The team competes in the NCAA Division I Football Championship Subdivision (FCS) as a member of CAA Football, the legally separate football league administered by the multi-sports Coastal Athletic Association (CAA). The 2013 season was the Great Danes' first in CAA Football, following a 14-year tenure in the Northeast Conference. Ten years later, they won their first-ever CAA championship, sharing the title with Villanova and Richmond.

Albany played football as a club sport in the 1920s, but dropped that program in 1924. The modern era of Albany football began in 1970, when the school restored football as a club sport. The team was upgraded to full varsity status in 1973. From the revival of football in 1970 through 2012, the team played its home games at the 10,000 seat University Field in Albany, New York. Albany opened a new 8,500-seat stadium, Bob Ford Field, for the 2013 season. The stadium was named after Bob Ford, who was the Great Danes' head coach from 1970 through 2013. It was renamed Bob Ford Field at Tom & Mary Casey Stadium after Tom & Mary Casey gave a $10 million gift to the school in 2015. The playing field retained the name of Bob Ford Field.

== History ==
=== Bob Ford era ===
During the late 1900s one of the most well known coaches at the university was football coach Bob Ford. The architect of the University at Albany's football program, Ford was Albany's only head coach from the reinstatement of the program after a 46-year absence until his retirement at the end of the 2013 season. Ford joined the program in 1970 when it was a club. After only three seasons at the club level, the program was upgraded to varsity status in 1973, and finished with a 7–2 record. In 1974, the team finished 9–0, the school's only undefeated season. Ford put together a record of 256-169 with the Great Danes. Ford recorded his 250th career win with a 38-10 victory against Duquesne on October 8, 2011.

During his time with Albany, Ford led the Great Danes to one ECAC North championship (D-III), one Division III playoff appearance, two East Football Conference championships, six Northeast Conference championships (two co-championship) and one Division I playoff appearance.

Ford's knowledge has also created a "coaching factory scenario" at the university. More than 100 coaches, who have started their careers under Ford, became high school, college, and professional coaches.

The Great Danes have been successful in football since its first season on the Division I-AA level. In the 1999 season the Great Danes compiled a 7–2 overall record, finishing 6–1 in-conference, which was good for second in the NEC.

In 2002, Ford's team had its first big successful season at the Division I level. The Great Danes, led by running-back Gary Jones, would win the program's first-ever Northeast Conference title. They would go on to defeat unbeaten Duquesne in the 2002 ECAC Bowl. Jones would set the single-season rushing record mark with 1,509 yards (1,380 m) and scoring a program record 22 rushing touchdowns.

Jones would break his own single-season mark the following season, rushing for 1,524 yards (1,394 m). He would also become the program's all-time leading rusher with 3,033 yards (2,773 m) in only two seasons with the Great Danes.

Success for Ford's program continued during the 2006 season. The Great Danes would defeat #11 FCS ranked University of Delaware (a full-scholarship program) 17–10 in front of just over 22,000 people on September 16. Two weeks later, for the first time in the program's history, the team would be ranked in both The Sports Network and College Sporting News Division I-AA national polls, ranked at No. 23 in both national rankings. The Great Danes would finish the season 7–4.

The 2006 season also marked a major change in recruitment of athletes for the football program. The program, which had played non-scholarship football since being established, had begun offering scholarships to part of its roster players, joining other Northeast Conference programs in the expansion of the conferences football teams.

Despite starting the season 1–3, including loses to #19 Hofstra and #2 University of Montana, the Great Danes in 2007 would run through the NEC Conference, going 6–0, to win their second conference championship. In what was deemed the 'NEC Championship Game', UAlbany defeated Central Connecticut State University 49–14 in the final regular season game. The Great Danes became the fifth team in NEC history to go undefeated in conference play. The victory also gave them a postseason appearance against the University of Dayton of the Pioneer League in the Gridiron Classic in Dayton, Ohio.

UAlbany continued its run during the 2008 season despite playing an un-orthodox schedule to start the season. The Great Danes would play their first five games of the season on the road, three against Top 25 ranked FCS opponents, and eight consecutive road games from the 2007 to the 2008 season. UAlbany would be the lone Football Bowl Subdivision and Football Championship Subdivision team to not play at home in August or September of the 2008 season.

Led by running-back David McCarty, who would break Gary Jones' single season and career rushing record during the season, the Great Danes would go 7–0 to win their second consecutive NEC Championship. The undefeated season marked a 13 conference game winning streak, second longest in NEC History, and the second time in conference history a team won back-to-back championships. The Great Danes defeated the Jacksonville University Dolphins in their second consecutive appearance in the Gridiron Classic on December 6, 2008 by a score of 28–0.

Prior to the 2008 season, the NCAA Board of Directors' approved the expansion of the Division I Football Championship Subdivision post-season bracket, allowing the Northeast Conference to gain automatic access into the Division I Football Championship beginning in 2010. The NEC's automatic access could come sooner than 2010 if its champion meets specified criteria of the Football Championship Committee for an at-large spot.

In 2011, after 39 years of running the program, Ford's program would reach a major accomplishment. The Great Danes would finish the season 8-3 (7-1 in conference), despite starting the season 0-2. The team would finish the season as co-champions with Duquesne. However, because of a 38-10 victory against the Dukes earlier in the season, the Great Danes would win their first ever trip to the NCAA Division I Football Championship. They would play former NEC opponent and Big South Champions, the Stony Brook Seawolves in the first round of the tournament. They would lose 31-28, as the Seawolves came up with an interception at the goal-line with under a minute to play. Stony Brook coach Chuck Priore graduated from Albany, played for Bob Ford and was running back coach for Albany from 1983 to 1985.

The Great Danes would have strong leaders on the 2011 team. Senior quarterback, Dan Di Lella would lead an offense that averaged 34.2 point per game. Di Lella would set a school record for most touchdown passes in a single season. On defense, senior captain defensive-end Eddie Delaney would set a single season school record for sacks. Delaney would also get national recognition for his success on the field despite being a diabetic and having been born without a left hand.[2]

=== Bob Ford Field and move to CAA Football ===
On April 17, 2012, the university broke ground on a new multi-sport complex that would be available for use beginning in Fall 2013. Along with a complex that will be the new home for football and soccer, a new track will be created on the current football field, University Field. The plans to build the stadium were revealed in the summer of 2011. The new stadium, which the field will be named Bob Ford Field, will hold initially 6,000. However, the stadium will be built so future expansion can take place upwards to 10,000 to 15,000.

It was announced on August 7, 2012 that beginning in 2013, the football program would accept an increase in scholarships and move out of the Northeast Conference and into CAA Football. Stony Brook, a former Northeast Conference rival, also made the move with them (it would eventually join the multi-sports CAA in 2022).

On November 17, 2012, the Great Danes played their final NEC game and final game at University Field against Central Connecticut State. UAlbany defeated the Blue Devils 63-34, finishing 78-24 all-time against NEC opponents and 127-65 at University Field. The Great Danes also clinched a share of the NEC Championship. However, they did not win the NEC automatic bid due to a loss against Wagner (one of only two losses on the 2012 season) and finishing in a tie with the Seahawks.

On August 13, 2013, Bob Ford, announced that after the 2013 season (his 45th year at UAlbany), he would be retiring. On November 16, 2013, Bob Ford coached his final home game for the Great Danes.

=== Post-Bob Ford era ===
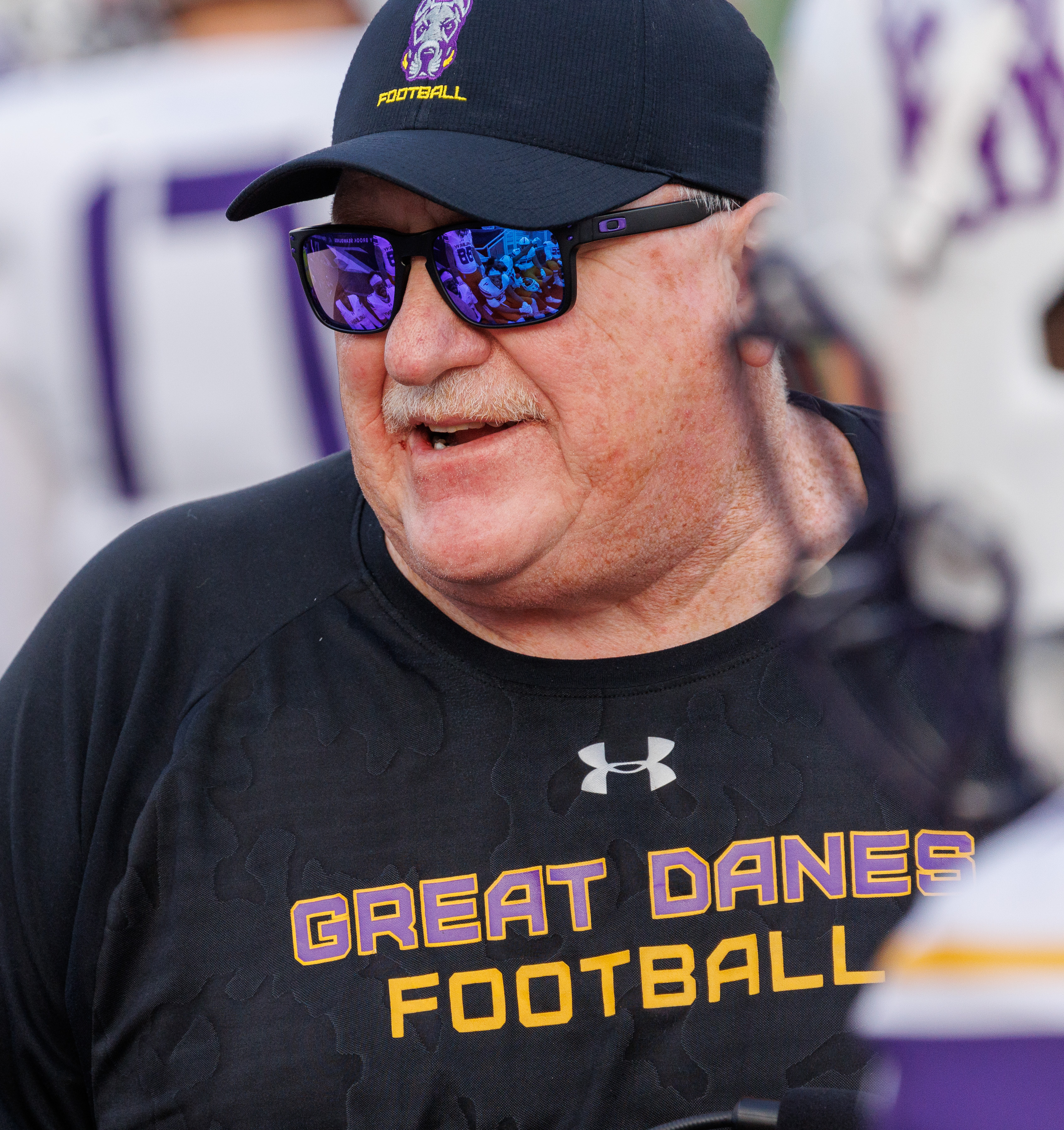
Greg Gattuso

The Great Danes would have their worst season under Bob Ford in 2013. The team would finish 1-11, the only time a Bob Ford team won only one game in a season. They would go 0-5 at home and 0-8 overall in their first season in CAA Football.

Despite the down season, there were memorable moments. On September 14, the Great Danes played their first game in brand new Bob Ford Field. In a 19–13 ^{OT} loss to Rhode Island, a sellout of 8,500 fans came for the home opener. Since tickets were not given for grass seats, it is believed near 12,000 showed up, making it one of the highest watched UAlbany games in program history.

Bob Ford would coach his final home game at UAlbany on November 16 against New Hampshire. On November 23, Ford would coach his final game at UAlbany, as the Great Danes would lose to Stony Brook on Long Island. He would finish with 265 career wins (256 at UAlbany), which was ranked 15th all-time in coaching victories at the time.

On December 9, 2013 Greg Gattuso, a former head coach at Duquesne University and assistant head coach at both Pittsburgh and Maryland, was named the new head coach at UAlbany.

=== 2024 semifinal season ===
Under Gattuso, the Great Danes saw growth as a program, but minimal success. From 2014-2023 the Danes finished above .500 only three times. They would finish second in the CAA in 2019 and receive an automatic qualifier to the NCAA Tournament. After a 42-14 first round win over Central Connecticut State, the Danes would lose in the second round to Montana State 47-21. The next three seasons the Danes would win only 6 games (26 games...only 4 games were played in 2020 season because of the COVID Pandemic).

In 2023, the Great Danes reached incredible new heights. The Great Danes finished with an 11-4 overall record, going 7-1 in Coastal Athletic Association (CAA) action. The team claimed its first ever CAA title, sharing it with Villanova and Richmond. The Great Danes defeated Villanova midway through the season, 31-10 at home, and took down Richmond in the Second Round of the FCS Playoffs, 41-13 at home.

UAlbany was awarded the NCAA's #5 seed in the playoffs, the highest the team has ever been ranked, while also receiving a First Round bye. The win over Richmond cemented the furthest the Great Danes had ever gotten in the postseason, previously having reached the Second Round in 2019. In the Quarterfinals, UAlbany flew across the country to #4 Idaho – taking down the Vandals, 30-22, in the Kibbie Dome to advance to the Semifinals before falling to South Dakota State, the top seed and the defending National Champions.

== UAlbany and the NFL ==
Rudy Vido, who graduated in 1974 as a fullback and defensive end, became the first player in school history to sign a contract with an NFL team. He was cut in the preseason by the New England Patriots, so he never played in the NFL. Vido was also signed by several Canadian Football League teams, but never played in the CFL, either.

In 2005, Kurt Campbell became the first player in the program's history to be drafted into the NFL. Campbell was selected in the seventh round by the Green Bay Packers.

In the 2007 NFL draft, Rashad Barksdale, who made the game-winning interception against Delaware in 2006, became the second player in school history to be drafted. He was selected in the sixth round by the Philadelphia Eagles. Barksdale was cut however at the end of training camp, but was signed by the Kansas City Chiefs, and became the first player in school history placed on an NFL 53-man roster.

Barksdale made his National Football League debut on October 7, 2007 against the Jacksonville Jaguars. It marked the first time a UAlbany player had appeared in an NFL regular-season game when he took the field on special teams. He also played on the punt cover and punt return units and recorded his first career tackle in the fourth-quarter.

Barksdale was cut by the Chiefs on August 31, 2008. However, he signed with the New York Giants as a member of the practice squad for the 2008 season. On December 30, 2008, Barksdale became the first UA stand-out to make an NFL Playoff roster after the Giants signed him to replace corner Sam Madison, who went down with an ankle injury.

The highest ranked former Great Danes to be drafted was defensive end Jared Verse. Verse redshirted his freshman season at Albany. He made 22 tackles with 10 tackles for loss and four sacks over four games during his redshirt freshman season, which was shortened and played in early 2021 due to the COVID-19 pandemic. He was named second-team All-Colonial Athletic Association (CAA) and won the conference's Defensive Rookie of the Year award. In 2021, Verse was named first-team All-CAA after finishing the season with 53 tackles, 11.5 tackles for loss, 9.5 sacks, and one forced fumble.

In 2022, Verse announced he was transferring to Florida State University to play for the Seminoles. He finished his first season with the Seminoles with 48 tackles, 17 tackles for loss, and 9 sacks. Verse declared for the 2024 NFL Draft following the 2023 season and was drafted 19th overall by the Los Angeles Rams.

| Player | Year | Position | NFL teams played with | NFL Regular Season debut date |
|---|---|---|---|---|
| Dan Gmelin | 1997 | WR/PR | San Diego Chargers |
| Seth Thomas | 1997 | TE | Carolina Panthers |
| Matt Caliandro | 1998 | DE | Tennessee Titans |
| Kurt Campbell | 2005 | LB | Green Bay Packers (Drafted 2005 – 7th Round); Oakland Raiders; Tennessee Titans |
| Geir Gudmundsen | 2005 | OL | Buffalo Bills |
| Andre Coleman | 2007 | DE | San Diego Chargers | 09/15/09 |
| Jacob Hobbs | 2007 | OG | Philadelphia Eagles |
| Rashad Barksdale | 2007 | DB | Philadelphia Eagles (Drafted 2007– 6th Round); Kansas City Chiefs; New York Giants; New York Jets; Arizona Cardinals | 10/07/07 |
| Jon Morgan | 2013 | LB | Detroit Lions |
| Drew Smith | 2013 | RB | Buffalo Bills |
| Paul Layton | 2014 | P | Green Bay Packers |
| Kadeem Williams | 2014 | OT | Arizona Cardinals |
| Brian Parker | 2015 | TE | San Diego Chargers; Kansas City Chiefs; New York Jets; Denver Broncos; New Orleans Saints | 11/01/15 |
| Abner Logan | 2017 | LB | Buffalo Bills |
| Anthony Manzo-Lewis | 2018 | FB/TE | Los Angeles Chargers |
| Vincent Testaverde Jr. | 2018 | QB | Tampa Bay Buccaneers |
| Juwan Green | 2020 | WR | Atlanta Falcons; Detroit Lions; Tennessee Titans; Kansas City Chiefs |
| Eli Mencer | 2020 | DL | Seattle Seahawks |
| Jarren Williams | 2020 | DB | Arizona Cardinals; New York Giants; Detroit Lions | 12/5/21 |
| Thomas Greaney | 2023 | TE | Cleveland Browns |
| Jared Verse | 2024 | DE | Los Angelese Rams (Drafted - 1st Round, 19th overall) | *Played for Great Danes from 2019-2021 before transferring to Florida State Seminoles. |
| Brevin Easton | 2024 | WR | Jacksonville Jaguars |
| Julian Hicks | 2024 | WR | Green Bay Packers |
| Brian Abraham | 2024 | LB | Chicago Bears |

The Great Danes have sent multiple players to try-outs and NFL training camps as un-drafted free agents. In addition to the NFL, multiple alumni have participated in the Canadian Football League and the Arena Football League. Many former coaching staff members have also coached in the NFL, including former NFL head coach Dave Campo. From 2006 to 2010, Tony and Andy Sparano were key figures on the Great Danes roster. At the same time, their father, Tony Sparano, was head coach of the Miami Dolphins. From 2017-2018, the son of well known former NFL QB Vinny Testaverde, Vincent Testaverde Jr., played for the Great Danes. In 2018, he was named the team's starting quarterback for the season. Testaverde started a total of eight games on the year and recorded 1,714 passing yards and 11 touchdowns.

The strongest connection to the NFL is the university hosting the New York Giants Summer Training Camp. From 1996 to 2012, the university's practice fields were handed over to the Giants, bringing fans and media from around New York and the United States to Albany. In 2007, the school dedicated the university's football practice field in honor of Wellington Mara and Preston Robert Tisch, the late co-owners of the Giants. Mara and Tisch were instrumental in making the University at Albany home to the Giants' summer training camp.

== Conferences ==
=== Classifications ===
- 1970–1994: NCAA Division III
- 1995–1998: NCAA Division II
- 1999–present: NCAA Division I–AA/FCS

=== Conference memberships ===
- 1970–1972: Independent
- 1973–1994: Division III Independent
- 1995–1996: Division II Independent
- 1997–1998: Eastern Football Conference
- 1999–2012: Northeast Conference
- 2013–present: CAA Football

== Championships ==
=== Conference championships ===
| Year | Coach | Conference | Overall record | Conference record |
|---|---|---|---|---|
| 1997 | Bob Ford | Eastern Football Conference | 11–1 | 8–0 |
| 1998 | Bob Ford | Eastern Football Conference | 10–1 | 7–1 |
| 2002 | Bob Ford | Northeast Conference | 8–4 | 6–1 |
| 2003† | Bob Ford | Northeast Conference | 7–4 | 6–1 |
| 2007 | Bob Ford | Northeast Conference | 8–4 | 6–0 |
| 2008 | Bob Ford | Northeast Conference | 9–3 | 7–0 |
| 2011† | Bob Ford | Northeast Conference | 8–4 | 7–1 |
| 2012† | Bob Ford | Northeast Conference | 9–2 | 7–1 |
| 2023† | Greg Gattuso | CAA Football | 11–4 | 7–1 |
| Conference Championships | | | 9 | |

† Co-champions

== Playoffs ==
=== Division III ===
The Great Danes made one appearance in the Division III playoffs, with a record of 1–1.

| Year | Round | Opponent | Result |
|---|---|---|---|
| 1977 | Quarterfinals; Semifinals | Hampden-Sydney; Widener | W 51–41; L 15–33 |

=== Division I FCS ===
The Great Danes have appeared in the FCS playoffs three times, with an overall record of 3–3.

| Year | Round | Opponent | Result |
|---|---|---|---|
| 2011 | First Round | at Stony Brook | L 28–31 |
| 2019 | First Round; Second Round | Central Connecticut at Montana State | W 42–14; L 21–47 |
| 2023 | Second Round; Quarterfinals; Semifinals | Richmond at Idaho at South Dakota State | W 49–13; W 30–22; L 0–59 |

== Future non-conference opponents ==
Announced schedules as of October 28, 2026.

| 2027 | 2028 | 2029 | 2030 |
|---|---|---|---|
| at Purdue | Colgate | at New Haven | New Haven |
| Yale | at Yale | | |
| Princeton | | | |
