= List of Robert Morris Colonials head football coaches =

The Robert Morris Colonials logo.

The Robert Morris Colonials college football team represents Robert Morris University in the National Collegiate Athletic Association (NCAA) Division I Football Championship Subdivision. The Colonials are currently football-only members of the Big South Conference. The program has had 3 head coaches since it began play during the 1994 season.

Robert Morris has played 273 games over 25 seasons, appearing in 1 postseason game.

== Key ==
Key to symbols in coaches list
General		Overall		Conference		Postseason (Note: Although the first Rose Bowl Game was played in 1902, it has been continuously played since the 1916 game, and is recognized as the oldest bowl game by the NCAA. "—" indicates any season prior to 1916 when postseason games were not played.)	
No.	Order of coaches (Note: A running total of the number of head coaches, with coaches who served separate tenures being counted only once. Interim head coaches are represented with "Int" and are not counted in the running total. "—" indicates the team played but either without a coach or no coach is on record. "X" indicates an interim year without play.)	GC	Games coached	CW	Conference wins	PW	Postseason wins
DC	Division championships	OW	Overall wins	CL	Conference losses	PL	Postseason losses
CC	Conference championships	OL	Overall losses	CT	Conference ties	PT	Postseason ties
NC	National championships	OT	Overall ties (Note: Overtime rules in college football were introduced in 1996, making ties impossible in the period since.)	C%	Conference winning percentage		
†	Elected to the College Football Hall of Fame	O%	Overall winning percentage (Note: When computing the win–loss percentage, a tie counts as half a win and half a loss.)				

== Coaches ==
List of head football coaches showing season(s) coached, overall records, conference records, postseason records, championships and selected awards (Note: Statistics correct as of the end of the 2024 NCAA Division I FCS football season.)
No.	Name	Season(s)	GC	OW	OL	OT	O%	CW	CL	CT	C%	PW	PL	PT	DC	CC	NC	Awards
1	Joe Walton	1994–2015	208	115	92	1	0.555	74	47	—	0.612	0	1	—	—	6	0	Robert Morris Athletic Hall of Fame (2013)
2	John Banaszak	2014–2017	42	8	34	—	0.190	3	19	—	0.136	—	—	—	—	—	0	
3	Bernard Clark	2018–present	82	27	55	—	0.329	17	30	—	0.362	—	—	—	—	—	0	
