= 2020 Gardner–Webb Runnin' Bulldogs football team =

American college football season

2020 Gardner–Webb Runnin' Bulldogs football
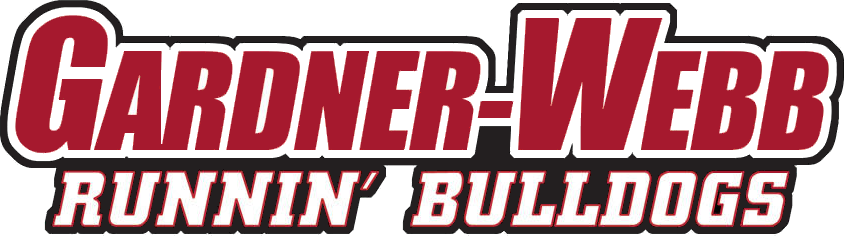
- Conference: Big South Conference
- Record: 2–2 (0–2 Big South)
- Head coach: Tre Lamb (1st season)
- Defensive coordinator: Josh Reardon (1st season)
- Home stadium: Ernest W. Spangler Stadium

2020 Big South Conference football standings
	Conf.			Overall
Team	W		L	W		L
No. 10 Monmouth $^	3	–	0	3	–	1
No. 17 Kennesaw State	2	–	1	4	–	1
Charleston Southern	2	–	2	2	–	2
Gardner–Webb	0	–	2	2	–	2
Robert Morris	0	–	2	0	–	3
$ – Conference champion; ^ – FCS playoff participant; Notes: Due to COVID-19, the Big South suspended the fall 2020 football season. Hampton opted out of the spring schedule. Campbell and North Alabama played only in the fall.; Rankings from STATS Poll

The 2020 Gardner–Webb Runnin' Bulldogs football team represented Gardner–Webb University as a member of the Big South Conference during the 2020–21 NCAA Division I FCS football season. Led by first-year head coach Tre Lamb, the Runnin' Bulldogs compiled an overall record of 2–2 with a mark of 0–2 in conference play, tying for fourth place in the Big South. Gardner–Webb played home games at Ernest W. Spangler Stadium in Boiling Springs, North Carolina.

== Preseason ==
=== Polls ===
In June 2020, the Runnin' Bulldogs were predicted to finish sixth in the Big South by a panel of media and head coaches.

== Schedule ==
Gardner–Webb originally had games scheduled against Georgia Tech, Hampton and Monmouth, but they were canceled due to each school's decision to cancel fall sports due to the COVID-19 pandemic.

Date	Time	Opponent	Site	TV	Result	Attendance
February 27	4:00 p.m.	No. 24 Elon*	Ernest W. Spangler Stadium; Boiling Springs, NC	ESPN+	W 42–20	
March 6	1:00 p.m.	Presbyterian*	Ernest W. Spangler Stadium; Boiling Springs, NC	ESPN+	W 31–24 ^{2OT}	
March 27	1:00 p.m.	No. 8 Kennesaw State	Ernest W. Spangler Stadium; Boiling Springs, NC	ESPN+	Canceled	
April 3	12:00 p.m.	Monmouth	Ernest W. Spangler Stadium; Boiling Springs, NC		L 19–48	
April 17	12:00 p.m.	at Charleston Southern	Buccaneer Field; North Charleston, SC		L 7–20	
*Non-conference game; Rankings from STATS Poll released prior to the game; All times are in Eastern time
