= 2020 Monmouth Hawks football team =

American college football season

2020 Monmouth Hawks football
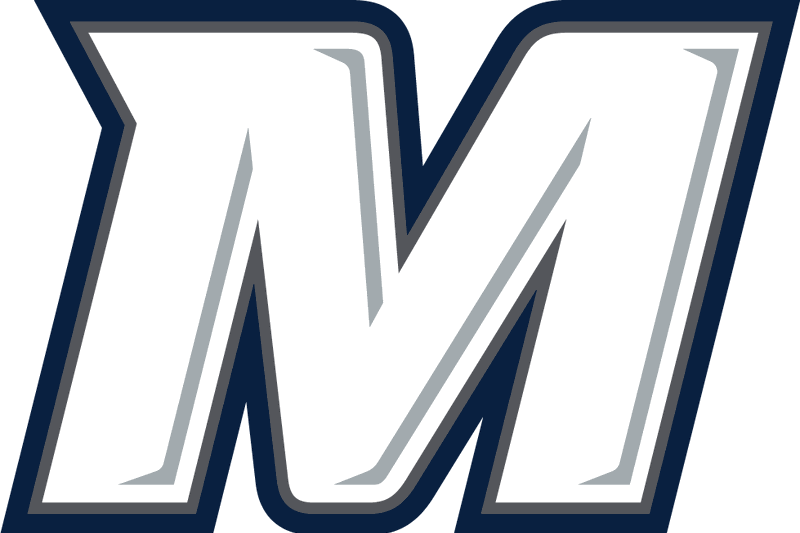

Big South champion

NCAA Division I First Round, L 15–21 vs. Sam Houston State
- Conference: Big South Conference

Ranking
- STATS: No. 10
- FCS Coaches: No. 10
- Record: 3–1 (3–0 Big South)
- Head coach: Kevin Callahan (28th season)
- Offensive coordinator: Jeff Gallo (2nd season)
- Offensive scheme: Air raid
- Defensive coordinator: Andy Bobik (27th season)
- Base defense: 4–3
- Home stadium: Kessler Stadium

2020 Big South Conference football standings
	Conf.			Overall
Team	W		L	W		L
No. 10 Monmouth $^	3	–	0	3	–	1
No. 17 Kennesaw State	2	–	1	4	–	1
Charleston Southern	2	–	2	2	–	2
Gardner–Webb	0	–	2	2	–	2
Robert Morris	0	–	2	0	–	3
$ – Conference champion; ^ – FCS playoff participant; Notes: Due to COVID-19, the Big South suspended the fall 2020 football season. Hampton opted out of the spring schedule. Campbell and North Alabama played only in the fall.; Rankings from STATS Poll

The 2020 Monmouth Hawks football team represented Monmouth University in the 2020 NCAA Division I FCS football season as a member of the Big South Conference. They will be led by 28th-year head coach Kevin Callahan and play their home games at Kessler Field in West Long Branch, New Jersey.

On July 27, it was announced that Monmouth would cancel its fall sports seasons due to the COVID-19 pandemic. Monmouth decided to play it's football season in the spring of 2021.

== Preseason ==
=== Polls ===
In June 2020, the Hawks were predicted to finish second in the Big South by a panel of media and head coaches.

== Schedule ==
Monmouth had games scheduled against Rutgers (September 5), Albany (September 12), Maine (September 19), Fordham (September 26), and Hampton (November 7), which were all later canceled before the start of the 2020 season.

Date	Time	Opponent	Rank	Site	TV	Result	Attendance
March 27	1:00 p.m.	Charleston Southern		Kessler Field; West Long Branch, NJ		W 35–17	
April 3	12:00 p.m.	at Gardner–Webb		Ernest W. Spangler Stadium; Boiling Springs, NC		W 48–19	
April 10	1:00 p.m.	No. 7 Kennesaw State	No. 20	Kessler Field; West Long Branch, NJ	ESPN+	W 42–17	
~~April 17~~		~~at Robert Morris~~	No. 12	~~Joe Walton Stadium~~; ~~Moon Township, PA~~		Canceled	
April 24		at No. 4 Sam Houston State	No. 10	Bowers Stadium; Huntsville, TX (NCAA Division I First Round)	ESPN3	L 15–21	
Rankings from STATS Poll released prior to the game; All times are in Eastern time
