= 2020 Charleston Southern Buccaneers football team =

American college football season

2020 Charleston Southern Buccaneers football
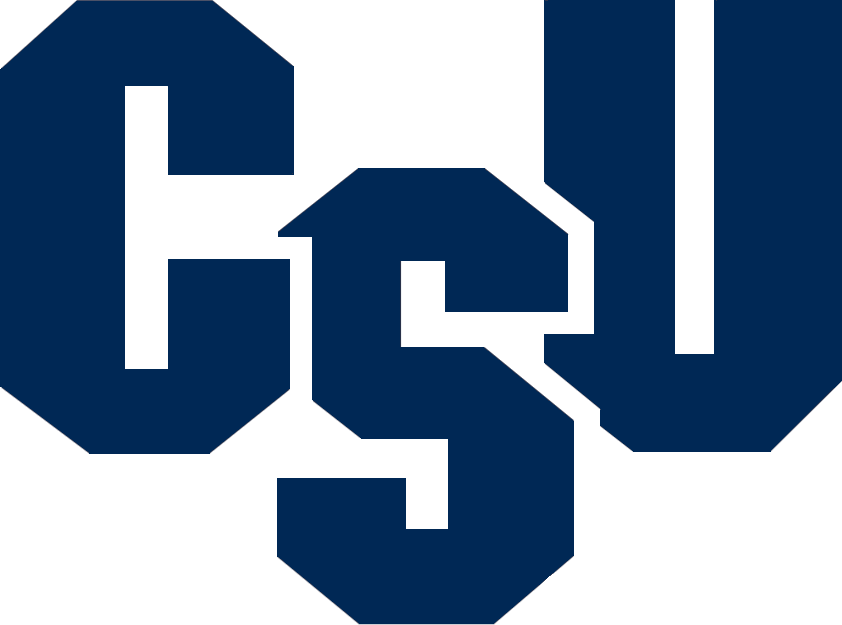
- Conference: Big South Conference
- Record: 2–2 (2–2 Big South)
- Head coach: Autry Denson (2nd season)
- Offensive coordinator: Klay Koester (1st season)
- Defensive coordinator: Zane Vance (4th season)
- Home stadium: Buccaneer Field

2020 Big South Conference football standings
	Conf.			Overall
Team	W		L	W		L
No. 10 Monmouth $^	3	–	0	3	–	1
No. 17 Kennesaw State	2	–	1	4	–	1
Charleston Southern	2	–	2	2	–	2
Gardner–Webb	0	–	2	2	–	2
Robert Morris	0	–	2	0	–	3
$ – Conference champion; ^ – FCS playoff participant; Notes: Due to COVID-19, the Big South suspended the fall 2020 football season. Hampton opted out of the spring schedule. Campbell and North Alabama played only in the fall.; Rankings from STATS Poll

The 2020 Charleston Southern Buccaneers football team represented Charleston Southern University as a member of the Big South Conference during the 2020–21 NCAA Division I FCS football season. Led by second-year head coach Autry Denson, the Buccaneers compiled an overall record of 2–2 with an identical mark in conference play, placing third in the Big South. Charleston Southern played home games at Buccaneer Field in Charleston, South Carolina.

== Preseason ==
=== Polls ===
In June 2020, the Buccaneers were predicted to finish third in the Big South by a panel of media and head coaches.

== Schedule ==
Charleston Southern had games scheduled against Monmouth, Hampton, and Arkansas, which were canceled due to the COVID-19 pandemic.

Date	Time	Opponent	Site	TV	Result	Attendance
March 13	1:00 p.m.	at No. 9 Kennesaw State	Fifth Third Bank Stadium; Kennesaw, GA	ESPN+	L 19–24	
March 27	12:00 p.m.	at Monmouth	Kessler Field; West Long Branch, NJ		L 17–35	
April 10	12:00 p.m.	Robert Morris	Buccaneer Field; North Charleston, SC		W 27–14	
April 17	12:00 p.m.	Gardner–Webb	Buccaneer Field; North Charleston, SC	ESPN+	W 20–7	
Rankings from STATS Poll released prior to the game; All times are in Eastern time
