= New Haven Chargers football =

New Haven Chargers
2026 New Haven Chargers football team
- First season: 1973; 53 years ago
- Athletic director: Devin Crosby
- Head coach: Mark Powell; 2nd season, 6–8–0 (.429)
- Location: West Haven, Connecticut, U.S.
- Stadium: Ralph F. DellaCamera Stadium (capacity: 5,000)
- NCAA division: Division I
- Conference: NEC (from July 1, 2025)
- Colors: Navy and Gold
- All-time record: 294–188–5 (.609)

Conference championships
- NE10: 2010, 2011, 2012, 2021, 2023, 2024
- Rivalries: Marist (rivalry)
- Website: Official website

The New Haven Chargers football program represents the intercollegiate football team for the University of New Haven. The Chargers previously competed in NCAA Division II as members of the Northeast-10 Conference but upgraded to the Division I Football Championship Subdivision (FCS) on July 1, 2025, when they joined the Northeast Conference.

The Chargers are coached by Mark Powell. In 2025, Powell was named the interim coach following the departure of Chris Pincince. The interim title was dropped in November 2025.

UNH home games are played on campus at the Ralph F. DellaCamera Stadium, which opened in 2009 and seats 5,000 spectators.

== History ==
=== Classifications ===
- 1973–1981: NCAA Division III
- 1982–2003, 2009–2025: NCAA Division II
- 2025–present: NCAA Division I FCS

=== Conference memberships ===
- 1973–1981: D-III Independent
- 1981–2003: D-II independent
- 2004–2008: No team
- 2009–2025: Northeast-10 Conference
- 2025–: Northeast Conference

== Championships ==
=== Conference ===
Season	Coach	Conference	Overall record
2010†	Pete Rossomando	6–2	8–2
2011	Pete Rossomando	8–0	11–2
2012	Pete Rossomando	8–0	10–1
2019†	Chris Pincince	6–2	7–3
2021	Chris Pincince	8–0	10–2
2022†	Chris Pincince	6–1	8–3
2023	Chris Pincince	6–1	8–3
2024	Chris Pincince	7–1	8–3

- † notes Co-championship

== Rivalries ==
New Haven has a rivalry with Marist called the 77 Classic, named after the 77 miles between the two schools. The rivalry was announced in December 2025 and will be played at the start of the season until 2032. Prior to 2025, the last time the two schools played each other was in 1973. Marist currently holds a 4–1 series lead over New Haven.

== Future opponents ==
Announced schedules as of August 14, 2026

2026	2027	2028	2029	2030	2031	2032
Marist (8/28)	at Marist (8/27)	Marist (8/25)	at Marist (8/24)	Marist (8/30)	at Marist (8/29)	Marist (8/27)
at South Dakota State (9/5)	at Toledo (9/11)		Albany (9/8)	at Albany (9/7)		
Brown (9/19)	at Brown (9/18)					
at Austin Peay (10/3)						
at Merrimack (9/26)						
