= 2020 North Alabama Lions football team =

American college football season

2020 North Alabama Lions football
- Conference: Big South Conference
- Record: 0–4 (0–0 Big South)
- Head coach: Chris Willis (4th season)
- Co-offensive coordinators: Zach Lisko (1st season); Tyler Rice (1st season)
- Defensive coordinator: Steadman Campbell (3rd season)
- Home stadium: Braly Municipal Stadium

2020 Big South Conference football standings
	Conf.			Overall
Team	W		L	W		L
No. 10 Monmouth $^	3	–	0	3	–	1
No. 17 Kennesaw State	2	–	1	4	–	1
Charleston Southern	2	–	2	2	–	2
Gardner–Webb	0	–	2	2	–	2
Robert Morris	0	–	2	0	–	3
$ – Conference champion; ^ – FCS playoff participant; Notes: Due to COVID-19, the Big South suspended the fall 2020 football season. Hampton opted out of the spring schedule. Campbell and North Alabama played only in the fall.; Rankings from STATS Poll

2020 NCAA Division I FCS independents football standings
	Conf.			Overall
Team	W		L	W		L
Stephen F. Austin		–		6	–	4
Tarleton State†		–		5	–	3
Central Arkansas		–		5	–	4
Presbyterian†		–		4	–	3
Eastern Kentucky		–		3	–	6
Dixie State†		–		2	–	3
Houston Baptist		–		1	–	3
Abilene Christian		–		1	–	5
Campbell		–		0	–	4
North Alabama		–		0	–	4
Note: † – Dixie State, Presbyterian, and Tarleton State played only in the spring. All other teams listed played only in the fall. Presbyterian was in a scheduling agreement with the Pioneer Football League, which it fully joined in July 2021.

The 2020 North Alabama Lions football team represented the University of North Alabama during the 2020–21 NCAA Division I FCS football season. They were led by fourth-year head coach Chris Willis. The Lions played their home games at Braly Municipal Stadium as second-year members of the Big South Conference.

== Schedule ==
North Alabama originally had games scheduled against Monmouth, Hampton and Virginia Tech, but they were canceled due to each school's decision to cancel fall sports due to the COVID-19 pandemic.

Date	Time	Opponent	Site	TV	Result	Attendance
October 3	12:00 p.m.	at Liberty*	Williams Stadium; Lynchburg, VA	ESPN3	L 7–28	1,000
October 17	1:00 p.m.	Jacksonville State*	Braly Stadium; Florence, AL	ESPN+	L 17–24	4,632
November 7	2:00 p.m.	at Southern Miss*	M. M. Roberts Stadium; Hattiesburg, MS	ESPN+	L 13–24	0
November 21		at No. 8 (FBS) BYU*	LaVell Edwards Stadium; Provo, UT	BYUtv, ESPN3	L 14–66	936
*Non-conference game; Rankings from STATS Poll released prior to the game; All times are in Central time

== Game summaries ==
=== At Liberty ===
North Alabama at Liberty

Team	1	2	3	4	Total
Lions	0	0	0	7	7
• Flames	0	7	14	7	28

- Date: October 3, 2020
- Location: Williams Stadium
  Lynchburg, VA
- Game start: 12:05 p.m. CDT
- Elapsed time: 2 hours and 53 minutes
- Game attendance: 1,000
- Game weather: 63 °F (17 °C) • Weather: Sunny • Wind: 7 E MPH
- Referee: Duane Heydt
- TV announcers (ESPN3): Matt Warner (play–by–play), Joe Jauch (analyst), and Emily Austen (sideline reporter)

Scoring summary
2	06:12	LIB	Demario Douglas 7-yard pass from Chris Ferguson (Alex Barbir kick) (6 plays, 40 yards, 2:09)	LIB 7–0
3	13:16	LIB	DJ Stubbs 12-yard pass from Chris Ferguson (Alex Barbir kick) (6 plays, 72 yards, 1:44)	LIB 14–0
3	05:37	LIB	Brody Brumm 2-yard pass from Chris Ferguson (Alex Barbir kick) (13 plays, 51 yards, 5:49)	LIB 21–0
4	14:23	LIB	Chris Barrett 5-yard pass from Johnathan Bennett (Alex Barbir kick) (8 plays, 69 yards, 2:43)	LIB 28–0
4	05:49	UNA	Parker Driggers 5-yard rush (Sam Contorno kick) (3 plays, 12 yards, 1:30)	LIB 28–7

Statistics	North Alabama	Liberty
First downs	14	22
Total yards	247	357
Rushing yards	63	250
Passing yards	184	107
Turnovers	3	1
Time of possession	32:10	27:50

Team	Category	Player	Statistics
North Alabama	Passing	Rett Files	15/24, 156 yards, 2 INTs
North Alabama	Rushing	Parker Driggers	7 carries, 55 yards, 1 TD
North Alabama	Receiving	Andre Little	1 reception, 47 yards
Liberty	Passing	Chris Ferguson	12/21, 64 yards, 3 TDs
Liberty	Rushing	Joshua Mack	16 carries, 130 yards
Liberty	Receiving	CJ Yarbrough	2 receptions, 43 yards

=== Jacksonville State ===
Jacksonville State at North Alabama

Team	1	2	3	4	Total
• Gamecocks	0	7	14	3	24
Lions	3	7	7	0	17

- Date: October 17, 2020
- Location: Braly Municipal Stadium
  Florence, AL
- Game start: 1:00 p.m. CDT
- Elapsed time:
- Game attendance:
- Game weather: • Weather: TBD • Wind: TBD MPH
- Referee:
- Television network: ESPN+

Scoring summary
1
2	{{{Event}}}
3	{{{Event}}}
4	{{{Event}}}

Statistics	Jacksonville State	North Alabama
First downs		
Total yards		
Rushing yards		
Passing yards		
Turnovers		
Time of possession		

Team	Category	Player	Statistics
Jacksonville State	Passing		
Jacksonville State	Rushing		
Jacksonville State	Receiving		
North Alabama	Passing		
North Alabama	Rushing		
North Alabama	Receiving		

=== At Southern Miss ===
North Alabama vs. Southern Mississippi

Team	1	2	3	4	Total
Lions	7	3	3	0	13
• Golden Eagles	0	7	0	17	24

- Date: November 7, 2020
- Location: M. M. Roberts Stadium
  Hattiesburg, MS
- Game start: 2:00 p.m. CST
- Elapsed time:
- Game attendance:
- Game weather: • Weather: TBD • Wind: TBD MPH
- Referee:
- Television network: ESPN+

Scoring summary
1
2	{{{Event}}}
3	{{{Event}}}
4	{{{Event}}}

Statistics	North Alabama	Southern Miss
First downs		
Total yards		
Rushing yards		
Passing yards		
Turnovers		
Time of possession		

Team	Category	Player	Statistics
North Alabama	Passing		
North Alabama	Rushing		
North Alabama	Receiving		
Southern Miss	Passing		
Southern Miss	Rushing		
Southern Miss	Receiving		

=== At BYU ===
North Alabama at BYU

Team	1	2	3	4	Total
Lions	0	7	0	7	14
• #8/8 Cougars	14	28	14	10	66

- Date: November 21
- Location: LaVell Edwards Stadium
  Provo, Utah
- Game start: 1:07 p.m. MST
- Elapsed time: 2:59
- Game attendance: 936
- Game weather: 45 °F (7 °C), Winds S 3 mph; Sunny
- Referee: Tuta Salaam
- TV announcers (BYUtv): Dave McCann, Blaine Fowler, and Jarom Jordan (BYUtv/ESPN3)
  Spencer Linton, David Nixon, and Mitch Mathews (byutv.org)

Scoring summary
1	9:42	BYU	Isaac Rex 2-yard pass from Zach Wilson (Jake Oldroyd kick) (6 plays, 80 yards, 2:26)	BYU 7–0
1	4:32	BYU	Tyler Allgeier 2-yard run (Jake Oldroyd kick) (8 plays, 91 yards, 2:59)	BYU 14–0
2	13:24	BYU	Tyler Allgeier 2-yard run (Jake Oldroyd kick) (11 plays, 86 yards, 3:12)	BYU 21–0
2	6:39	BYU	Neil Pau'u 19-yard pass from Zach Wilson (Justen Smith kick) (3 plays, 62 yards, 1:11)	BYU 28–0
2	2:59	BYU	Isaac Rex 3-yard pass from Zach Wilson (Jake Oldroyd kick) (4 plays, 6 yards, 1:51)	BYU 35–0
2	1:37	UNA	Ja'Won Howell 2-yard run (Grayson Easterling kick) (6 plays, 75 yards, 1:22)	BYU 35–7
2	0:40	BYU	Kavika Fonua 22-yard pass from Zach Wilson (Jake Oldroyd kick) (3 plays, 75 yards, 0:57)	BYU 42–7
3	10:50	BYU	Kavika Fonua 7-yard pass from Baylor Romney (Jake Oldroyd kick) (5 plays, 39 yards, 2:36)	BYU 49–7
3	0:01	BYU	Miles Davis 6-yard run (Jake Oldroyd kick) (6 plays, 55 yards, 3:33)	BYU 56–7
4	12:09	UNA	Jakobi Byrd 29-yard pass from Rett Files (Grayson Easterling kick) (6 plays, 69 yards, 2:51)	BYU 56–14
4	3:36	BYU	Jake Oldroyd 53-yard field goal (8 plays, 36 yards, 4:01)	BYU 59–14
4	2:36	BYU	Miles Davis 26-yard run (Jake Oldroyd kick) (1 play, 26 yards, 0:07)	BYU 66–14

Statistics	North Alabama	BYU
First downs	21	25
Total yards	354	555
Rushing yards	49	278
Passing yards	305	277
Turnovers	3	0
Time of possession	33:23	26:37

Team	Category	Player	Statistics
North Alabama	Passing	Rett Files	15/21, 198 yards, TD, INT
North Alabama	Rushing	Tyler Prince	5 carries, 24 yards
North Alabama	Receiving	Dexter Boykin	3 receptions, 64 yards
BYU	Passing	Zach Wilson	10/16, 212 yards, 4 TD
BYU	Rushing	Tyler Allgeier	13 carries, 141 yards, 2 TD
BYU	Receiving	Dax Milne	4 receptions, 101 yards
