= Mark Powell (American football) =

American football coach (born 1992)

Current position
- Title: Head coach/Defensive coordinator
- Team: New Haven
- Conference: NEC
- Record: 7–10

Biographical details
- Born: April 14, 1992 (age 34); Orange, Connecticut, U.S.
- Height: 5 ft 11 in (180 cm)
- Weight: 235 lb (107 kg; 16 st 11 lb)
- Education: Lafayette College (2014); Mississippi State University (2021)

Playing career
- 2011–2013: Lafayette
- Position: Linebacker

Coaching career (HC unless noted)
- 2013: Lafayette (DA)
- 2014: Yale (DA/STA)
- 2015: Villanova (DA)
- 2016: Villanova (OA/TE)
- 2017: Marshall (GA/LB)
- 2017: Christopher Newport (ST/DL/OLB)
- 2018: Mississippi State (GA/D)
- 2019–2021: Austin Peay (DC)
- 2022: Fordham (DC/OLB)
- 2023–2024: Darien HS (DC)
- 2025–present: New Haven

Head coaching record
- Overall: 5–5

Mark Powell (born April 14, 1992) is an American college football coach and former player who currently is the head football coach and defensive coordinator for the New Haven Chargers of the Northeast Conference (NEC). He played college football for Lafayette as a linebacker and has since coached for Lafayette, Yale, Villanova, Marshall, Christopher Newport, Mississippi State, Austin Peay, Fordham, Darien High School and New Haven.

== Head coaching record ==
Year	Team	Overall	Conference	Standing	Bowl/playoffs
New Haven Chargers (Northeast Conference) (2025–present)
2025	New Haven	5–5	0–0		
2026	New Haven	2–5	1–1		
New Haven:		7–10	1–1		
Total:		7–10			
National championship Conference title Conference division title or championship game berth
