= 2026 New Haven Chargers football team =

American college football season

2026 New Haven Chargers football
- Conference: Northeast Conference
- Record: 3–9 (2–5 NEC)
- Head coach: Mark Powell (2nd season)
- Offensive coordinator: Brian Scott (1st season)
- Home stadium: Ralph F. DellaCamera Stadium

2026 Northeast Conference football standings
	Conf.			Overall
Team	W		L	W		L
Central Connecticut +	5	–	1	6	–	4
Robert Morris	4	–	2	6	–	5
Duquesne	4	–	2	5	–	5
LIU	4	–	2	4	–	7
Stonehill	3	–	3	4	–	7
Wagner	2	–	4	3	–	8
New Haven*	2	–	4	3	–	8
Mercyhurst*	0	–	6	1	–	10
+ – Conference co-champions; ^ – FCS playoff participant; * – Ineligible for NEC title and FCS postseason play due to transition from NCAA Division II.; As of November 21, 2026; Rankings from STATS Poll

The 2026 New Haven Chargers football team represented the University of New Haven as a member of the Northeast Conference (NEC) during the 2026 NCAA Division I FCS football season. The Chargers were led by second-year head coach Mark Powell, and played their games at Ralph F. DellaCamera Stadium in West Haven, Connecticut. New Haven is in its four-year transition period from NCAA Division II and therefore is ineligible for Northeast Conference championships and the FCS playoffs.

== Schedule ==
Date	Time	Opponent	Site	TV	Result	Attendance
August 28	6:00 p.m.	Marist*	Ralph F. DellaCamera Stadium; West Haven, CT	NEC Front Row	W 22–21	7,030
September 5	12:00 p.m.	Stonehill	Ralph F. DellaCamera Stadium; West Haven, CT	NEC Front Row/NESN+	L 3–21	4,797
September 12	7:00 p.m.	at No. 2 South Dakota State*	Dana J. Dykhouse Stadium; Brookings, SD	ESPN+	L 14–57	19,013
September 19	12:00 p.m.	Brown*^{†}	Ralph F. DellaCamera Stadium; West Haven, CT	NEC Front Row	L 10–17	7,200
September 26	1:00 p.m.	at Merrimack*	Duane Stadium; North Andover, MA	ESPN+	L 10–17	3,592
October 3	5:00 p.m.	at No. 11 Austin Peay*	Fortera Stadium; Clarksville, TN	ESPN+	L 17–42	7,763
October 17	12:00 p.m.	at Robert Morris	Joe Walton Stadium; Moon Township, PA	NEC Front Row	W 26–15	1,235
October 24	12:00 p.m.	at Central Connecticut	Arute Field; New Britain, CT	NEC Front Row	L 20–42	3,109
October 31	12:00 p.m.	Duquesne	Ralph F. DellaCamera Stadium; West Haven, CT	ESPN+/NESN 360	L 14–41	4,200
November 7	12:00 p.m.	LIU	Ralph F. DellaCamera Stadium; West Haven, CT	NEC Front Row	W 17–10	4,287
November 14	12:00 p.m.	at Wagner	Wagner College Stadium; Staten Island, NY	NEC Front Row	L 10–14	1,321
November 21	12:00 p.m.	at Mercyhurst	Saxon Stadium; Erie, PA	NEC Front Row	L 13–31	1,498
*Non-conference game; ^{†}Homecoming; Rankings from STATS Poll released prior to the game; All times are in Eastern time; Source:

== Preseason ==
=== NEC poll ===
The Northeast Conference released their preseason poll on August 3, 2026. The Chargers were picked to finish last (eighth).

== Game summaries ==
=== Marist ===
Marist Red Foxes (0–0) at New Haven Chargers (0–0) – Game summary

Quarter	1	2	3	4	Total
Red Foxes	7	7	7	0	21
Chargers	3	7	9	3	22

at Ralph F. DellaCamera Stadium • West Haven, Connecticut

- Date: August 28
- Game time: 6:00 p.m.
- Game weather: Sunny
- Game attendance: 7,030
- Referee: Dave Stewart
- TV announcers (NEC Front Row): J.W. Stewart and Steve Kunsey

Game information

First quarter

- NH – Liam Quigley 38-yard field goal, 8:57. Chargers 3–0. Drive: 9 plays, 48 yards, 5:12.
- MRST – Sonny Mannino 5-yard run (Luke Stenson kick), 1:54. Red Foxes 7–3. Drive: 9 plays, 70 yards, 3:41.

Second quarter

- MRST – Jordan Caldwell 25-yard interception return (Luke Stenson kick), 13:46. Red Foxes 14–3.
- NH – Isaac Glaudin 39-yard pass from AJ Duffy (Liam Quigley kick), 3:58. Red Foxes 14–10. Drive: 7 plays, 59 yards, 3:12.

Third quarter

- MRST – Zach Garmont 0-yard blocked punt return (Luke Stenson kick), 14:11. Red Foxes 21–10.
- NH – Liam Quigley 35-yard field goal, 10:57. Red Foxes 21–13. Drive: 8 plays, 61 yards, 3:09.
- NH – Nate Burleson II 46-yard pass from AJ Duffy (pass failed), 1:32. Red Foxes 21–19. Drive: 3 plays, 51 yards, 1:15.

Fourth quarter

- NH – Liam Quigley 19-yard field goal, 4:07. Chargers 22–21. Drive: 12 plays, 64 yards, 6:04.

Statistics	MRST	NH
First downs	6	19
Plays–yards	46–160	75–418
Rushes–yards	27–90	37–107
Passing yards	70	311
Passing: comp–att–int	9–19–0	22–38–1
Turnovers	0	1
Time of possession	24:12	35:48

Team	Category	Player	Statistics
Marist	Passing	Sonny Mannino	9/19, 70 yards
Marist	Rushing	Jeremy DeCaro	7 carries, 44 yards
Marist	Receiving	Jayden Taylor	2 receptions, 42 yards
New Haven	Passing	AJ Duffy	22/37, 311 yards, 2 TD, INT
New Haven	Rushing	Zaon Laney	17 carries, 45 yards
New Haven	Receiving	Isaac Glaudin	7 receptions, 99 yards, TD

=== Stonehill ===
Stonehill Skyhawks (0–1) at New Haven Chargers (1–0) – Game summary

Quarter	1	2	3	4	Total
Skyhawks	7	14	0	0	21
Chargers	3	0	0	0	3

at Ralph F. DellaCamera Stadium • West Haven, Connecticut

- Date: September 5
- Game time: 12:00 p.m.
- Game weather: Sunny
- Game attendance: 4,797
- Referee: Lance Carlen
- TV: NEC Front Row/NESN+

Game information

First quarter

- NH – Liam Quigley 21-yard field goal, 12:19. Chargers 3–0. Drive: 8 plays, 43 yards, 2:23.
- STO – Aidan Garrett 25-yard pass from Jack O'Connell (Domenic Scalese kick), 9:14. Skyhawks 7–3. Drive: 7 plays, 75 yards, 3:05.

Second quarter

- STO – Aidan Garrett 1-yard run (Domenic Scalese kick), 4:18. Skyhawks 14–3. Drive: 10 plays, 44 yards, 5:43.
- STO – Torance Washington Jr. 31-yard pass from Jack O'Connell (Domenic Scalese kick), 1:54. Skyhawks 21–3. Drive: 4 plays, 43 yards, 1:16.

Third quarter

- No scoring plays.

Fourth quarter

- No scoring plays.

Statistics	STO	NH
First downs	21	14
Plays–yards	61–373	57–295
Rushes–yards	43–181	22–122
Passing yards	192	173
Passing: comp–att–int	14–18–0	17–35–2
Turnovers	2	2
Time of possession	38:31	21:29

Team	Category	Player	Statistics
Stonehill	Passing	Jack O'Connell	14/18, 192 yards, 2 TD
Stonehill	Rushing	Shane Eason	15 carries, 82 yards
Stonehill	Receiving	Cole Clarke	2 receptions, 46 yards
New Haven	Passing	AJ Duffy	17/35, 173 yards, 2 INT
New Haven	Rushing	Zaon Laney	17 carries, 114 yards
New Haven	Receiving	Matt Chandler	4 receptions, 49 yards

=== at No. 2 South Dakota State ===
New Haven Chargers (1–1) at No. 2 South Dakota State Jackrabbits (1–1) – Game summary

Quarter	1	2	3	4	Total
Chargers	0	0	0	14	14
No. 2 Jackrabbits	3	33	14	7	57

at Dana J. Dykhouse Stadium • Brookings, South Dakota

- Date: September 12
- Game time: 7:00 p.m.
- Game weather: Clear • Temperature: 69 °F (21 °C) • Wind: N at 10 miles per hour (16 km/h)
- Game attendance: 19,013
- Referee: Gregory Gompf
- TV announcers (ESPN+): Tyler Merriam (play-by-play), Kurtiss Riggs (analyst) and Kelsey Dennehy (sideline)

Game information

First quarter

- (8:42) SDST – Tristan Alvano 31-yard field goal (Drive: 15 plays, 67 yards, 6:12; South Dakota State 3–0)

Second quarter

- (13:30) SDST – Chase Mason 1-yard run, Tristan Alvano kick (Drive: 14 plays, 66 yards, 6:04; South Dakota State 10–0)
- (6:17) SDST – Ramon McKinney Jr. 22-yard run, Tristan Alvano kick (Drive: 9 plays, 99 yards, 4:35; South Dakota State 17–0)
- (4:16) SDST – Carter Sitzman 0-yard safety (South Dakota State 19–0)
- (1:56) SDST – Tristan Alvano 36-yard field goal (Drive: 5 plays, 50 yards, 2:16; South Dakota State 22–0)
- (1:39) SDST – Coleman Kuntz 25-yard pass from Chase Mason, Tristan Alvano kick (Drive: 1 play, 25 yards, 0:05; South Dakota State 29–0)
- (0:50) SDST – Greyton Gannon 24-yard pass from Chase Mason, Tristan Alvano kick (Drive: 3 plays, 55 yards, 0:20; South Dakota State 36–0)

Third quarter

- (12:46) SDST – Greyton Gannon 29-yard pass from Chase Mason, Tristan Alvano kick (Drive: 3 plays, 43 yards, 1:16; South Dakota State 43–0)
- (12:31) SDST – James Basinger 27-yard run, Tristan Alvano kick (Drive: 1 play, 27 yards, 0:09; South Dakota State 50–0)

Fourth quarter

- (13:26) SDST – James Basinger 55-yard run, Tristan Alvano kick (Drive: 2 plays, 59 yards, 0:48; South Dakota State 57–0)
- (10:32) NH – Lasalle Rose Jr. 19-yard pass from Jake Tripptree, Liam Quigley kick (Drive: 3 plays, 15 yards, 0:44; South Dakota State 57–7)
- (5:08) NH – Jason Champagne 49-yard run, Liam Quigley kick (Drive: 5 plays, 80 yards, 2:26; South Dakota State 57–14)

Statistics	NH	SDST
First downs	10	24
Plays–yards	59–236	68–512
Rushes–yards	34–150	46–256
Passing yards	86	256
Passing: comp–att–int	9–25–0	13–22–0
Turnovers	2	1
Time of possession	26:17	33:43

Team	Category	Player	Statistics
New Haven	Passing	AJ Duffy	6/20, 48 yards
New Haven	Rushing	Zaon Laney	15 carries, 54 yards
New Haven	Receiving	Issac Glaudin	3 receptions, 27 yards
South Dakota State	Passing	Chase Mason	12/28, 255 yards, 3 TD
South Dakota State	Rushing	James Basinger	6 carries, 88 yards, 2 TD
South Dakota State	Receiving	Grahm Goering	2 receptions, 77 yards

=== Brown ===
Brown Bears (0–0) at New Haven Chargers (1–2) – Game summary

Quarter	1	2	3	4	Total
Bears	7	10	0	0	17
Chargers	0	0	3	7	10

at Ralph F. DellaCamera Stadium • West Haven, Connecticut

- Date: September 19
- Game time: 12:00 p.m.
- Game weather: Sunny
- Game attendance: 7,200
- Referee: Michael Davis
- TV: NEC Front Row

Game information

First quarter

- BRWN – Matt Childs 3-yard run (Drew Crabtree kick), 8:58. Bears 7–0. Drive: 3 plays, 90 yards, 1:06.

Second quarter

- BRWN – Matt Childs 3-yard run (Drew Crabtree kick), 11:33. Bears 14–0. Drive: 10 plays, 53 yards, 4:24.
- BRWN – Drew Crabtree 29-yard field goal, 0:02. Bears 17–0. Drive: 12 plays, 78 yards, 1:52.

Third quarter

- NH – Liam Quigley 25-yard field goal, 1:17. Bears 17–3. Drive: 13 plays, 41 yards, 6:23.

Fourth quarter

- NH – Dom Grguric 5-yard pass from AJ Duffy, 9:49. Bears 17–10. Drive: 10 plays, 79 yards, 3:47.

Statistics	BRWN	NH
First downs	23	17
Plays–yards	72–422	74–278
Rushes–yards	33–79	27–63
Passing yards	343	215
Passing: comp–att–int	26–39–2	27–47–1
Turnovers	3	1
Time of possession	27:54	32:06

Team	Category	Player	Statistics
Brown	Passing	James Murphy	26/38, 343 yards, 2 INT
Brown	Rushing	Matt Childs	14 carries, 53 yards, 2 TD
Brown	Receiving	Matt Childs	3 receptions, 95 yards
New Haven	Passing	AJ Duffy	27/47, 215 yards, TD, INT
New Haven	Rushing	Zaon Laney	13 carries, 37 yards
New Haven	Receiving	Dom Grguric	6 receptions, 55 yards, TD

=== at Merrimack ===
New Haven Chargers (1–3) at Merrimack Warriors (1–3) – Game summary

Quarter	1	2	3	4	Total
Chargers	0	0	0	0	0
Warriors	0	0	0	0	0

at Duane Stadium • North Andover, Massachusetts

- Date: September 26
- Game time: 1:00 p.m.
- Game attendance: 3,592
- TV: ESPN+

Game information

First quarter
Second quarter
Third quarter
Fourth quarter

Statistics	NH	MRMK
First downs		
Plays–yards		
Rushes–yards		
Passing yards		
Passing: comp–att–int		
Turnovers		
Time of possession		

Team	Category	Player	Statistics
New Haven	Passing		
New Haven	Rushing		
New Haven	Receiving		
Merrimack	Passing		
Merrimack	Rushing		
Merrimack	Receiving		

=== at No. 11 Austin Peay ===
New Haven Chargers (1–4) at No. 11 Austin Peay Governors (4–1) – Game summary

Quarter	1	2	3	4	Total
Chargers	0	0	0	0	0
No. 11 Governors	0	0	0	0	0

at Fortera Stadium • Clarksville, Tennessee

- Date: October 3
- Game time: 5:00 p.m.
- Game attendance: 7,763
- TV: ESPN+

Game information

First quarter
Second quarter
Third quarter
Fourth quarter

Statistics	NH	APSU
First downs		
Plays–yards		
Rushes–yards		
Passing yards		
Passing: comp–att–int		
Turnovers		
Time of possession		

Team	Category	Player	Statistics
New Haven	Passing		
New Haven	Rushing		
New Haven	Receiving		
Austin Peay	Passing		
Austin Peay	Rushing		
Austin Peay	Receiving		

=== at Robert Morris ===
New Haven Chargers (1–5) at Robert Morris Colonials (3–3) – Game summary

Quarter	1	2	3	4	Total
Chargers	0	0	0	0	0
Colonials	0	0	0	0	0

at Joe Walton Stadium • Moon Township, Pennsylvania

- Date: October 17
- Game time: 12:00 p.m.
- Game attendance: 1,235
- TV: NEC Front Row

Game information

First quarter
Second quarter
Third quarter
Fourth quarter

Statistics	NH	RMU
First downs		
Plays–yards		
Rushes–yards		
Passing yards		
Passing: comp–att–int		
Turnovers		
Time of possession		

Team	Category	Player	Statistics
New Haven	Passing		
New Haven	Rushing		
New Haven	Receiving		
Robert Morris	Passing		
Robert Morris	Rushing		
Robert Morris	Receiving		

=== at Central Connecticut ===
New Haven Chargers (2–5) at Central Connecticut Blue Devils (3–3) – Game summary

Quarter	1	2	3	4	Total
Chargers	0	0	0	0	0
Blue Devils	0	0	0	0	0

at Arute Field • New Britain, Connecticut

- Date: October 24
- Game time: 12:00 p.m.
- Game attendance: 3,109
- TV: NEC Front Row

Game information

First quarter
Second quarter
Third quarter
Fourth quarter

Statistics	NH	CCSU
First downs		
Plays–yards		
Rushes–yards		
Passing yards		
Passing: comp–att–int		
Turnovers		
Time of possession		

Team	Category	Player	Statistics
New Haven	Passing		
New Haven	Rushing		
New Haven	Receiving		
Central Connecticut	Passing		
Central Connecticut	Rushing		
Central Connecticut	Receiving		

=== Duquesne ===
Duquesne Dukes (3–4) at New Haven Chargers (2–6) – Game summary

Quarter	1	2	3	4	Total
Dukes	0	0	0	0	0
Chargers	0	0	0	0	0

at Ralph F. DellaCamera Stadium • West Haven, Connecticut

- Date: October 31
- Game time: 12:00 p.m.
- TV: ESPN+/NESN 360

Game information

First quarter
Second quarter
Third quarter
Fourth quarter

Statistics	DUQ	NH
First downs		
Plays–yards		
Rushes–yards		
Passing yards		
Passing: comp–att–int		
Turnovers		
Time of possession		

Team	Category	Player	Statistics
Duquesne	Passing		
Duquesne	Rushing		
Duquesne	Receiving		
New Haven	Passing		
New Haven	Rushing		
New Haven	Receiving		

=== LIU ===
LIU Sharks (3–6) at New Haven Chargers (2–7) – Game summary

Quarter	1	2	3	4	Total
Sharks	0	0	0	0	0
Chargers	0	0	0	0	0

at Ralph F. DellaCamera Stadium • West Haven, Connecticut

- Date: November 7
- Game time: 12:00 p.m.
- TV: NEC Front Row

Game information

First quarter
Second quarter
Third quarter
Fourth quarter

Statistics	LIU	NH
First downs		
Plays–yards		
Rushes–yards		
Passing yards		
Passing: comp–att–int		
Turnovers		
Time of possession		

Team	Category	Player	Statistics
LIU	Passing		
LIU	Rushing		
LIU	Receiving		
New Haven	Passing		
New Haven	Rushing		
New Haven	Receiving		

=== at Wagner ===
New Haven Chargers (3–7) at Wagner Seahawks (2–8) – Game summary

Quarter	1	2	3	4	Total
Chargers	0	0	0	0	0
Seahawks	0	0	0	0	0

at Wagner College Stadium • Staten Island, New York

- Date: November 14
- Game time: 12:00 p.m.
- TV: NEC Front Row

Game information

First quarter
Second quarter
Third quarter
Fourth quarter

Statistics	NH	WAG
First downs		
Plays–yards		
Rushes–yards		
Passing yards		
Passing: comp–att–int		
Turnovers		
Time of possession		

Team	Category	Player	Statistics
New Haven	Passing		
New Haven	Rushing		
New Haven	Receiving		
Wagner	Passing		
Wagner	Rushing		
Wagner	Receiving		

=== at Mercyhurst ===
New Haven Chargers (3–8) at Mercyhurst Lakers (1–10) – Game summary

Quarter	1	2	3	4	Total
Chargers	0	0	0	0	0
Lakers	0	0	0	0	0

at Saxon Stadium • Erie, Pennsylvania

- Date: November 21
- Game time: 12:00 p.m.
- TV: NEC Front Row

Game information

First quarter
Second quarter
Third quarter
Fourth quarter

Statistics	NH	MERC
First downs		
Plays–yards		
Rushes–yards		
Passing yards		
Passing: comp–att–int		
Turnovers		
Time of possession		

Team	Category	Player	Statistics
New Haven	Passing		
New Haven	Rushing		
New Haven	Receiving		
Mercyhurst	Passing		
Mercyhurst	Rushing		
Mercyhurst	Receiving		
