= 2020 Campbell Fighting Camels football team =

American college football season

2020 Campbell Fighting Camels football
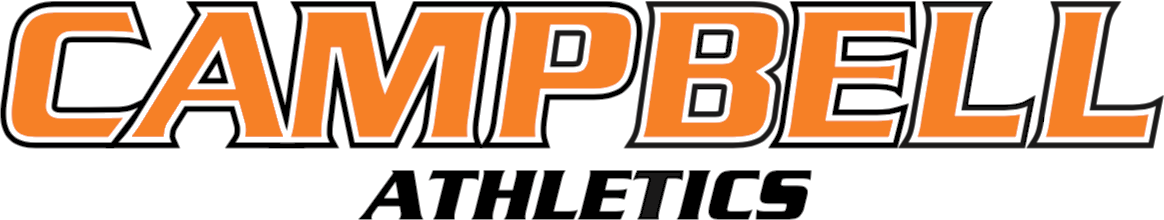
- Conference: Big South Conference
- Record: 0–4 (0–0 Big South)
- Head coach: Mike Minter (8th season)
- Offensive coordinator: Nick Grimes (2nd season)
- Defensive coordinator: Weston Glaser (2nd season)
- Home stadium: Barker–Lane Stadium

2020 Big South Conference football standings
	Conf.			Overall
Team	W		L	W		L
No. 10 Monmouth $^	3	–	0	3	–	1
No. 17 Kennesaw State	2	–	1	4	–	1
Charleston Southern	2	–	2	2	–	2
Gardner–Webb	0	–	2	2	–	2
Robert Morris	0	–	2	0	–	3
$ – Conference champion; ^ – FCS playoff participant; Notes: Due to COVID-19, the Big South suspended the fall 2020 football season. Hampton opted out of the spring schedule. Campbell and North Alabama played only in the fall.; Rankings from STATS Poll

2020 NCAA Division I FCS independents football standings
	Conf.			Overall
Team	W		L	W		L
Stephen F. Austin		–		6	–	4
Tarleton State†		–		5	–	3
Central Arkansas		–		5	–	4
Presbyterian†		–		4	–	3
Eastern Kentucky		–		3	–	6
Dixie State†		–		2	–	3
Houston Baptist		–		1	–	3
Abilene Christian		–		1	–	5
Campbell		–		0	–	4
North Alabama		–		0	–	4
Note: † – Dixie State, Presbyterian, and Tarleton State played only in the spring. All other teams listed played only in the fall. Presbyterian was in a scheduling agreement with the Pioneer Football League, which it fully joined in July 2021.

The 2020 Campbell Fighting Camels football team represented Campbell University in the 2020–21 NCAA Division I FCS football season. They were led by eighth-year head coach Mike Minter and played their home games at Barker–Lane Stadium. They were third-year members of the Big South Conference.

== Schedule ==
Campbell originally had games scheduled against Davidson (September 5), Elon (September 19), Hampton (October 17), and Monmouth (October 24), but they were canceled before the start of the season due to the COVID-19 pandemic.

Date	Time	Opponent	Site	TV	Result	Attendance
September 12	3:30 p.m.	at Georgia Southern*	Paulson Stadium; Statesboro, GA	ESPNU	L 26–27	5,789
September 18	7:00 p.m.	at Coastal Carolina*	Brooks Stadium; Conway, SC	ESPN	L 21–43	5,000
September 26	12:00 p.m.	at Appalachian State*	Kidd Brewer Stadium; Boone, NC	ESPN+	L 21–52	350
October 2	8:00 p.m.	at Wake Forest*	Truist Field at Wake Forest; Winston-Salem, NC	ACC Network	L 14–66	2,058
*Non-conference game; Rankings from STATS Poll released prior to the game; All times are in Eastern time

== Game summaries ==
=== At Georgia Southern ===
Campbell at Georgia Southern

Team	1	2	3	4	Total
Fighting Camels	13	0	7	6	26
• Eagles	3	3	7	14	27

- Date: September 12, 2020
- Location: Paulson Stadium
  Statesboro, GA
- Game start: 4:14 p.m. EDT
- Elapsed time: 3 hours and 35 minutes
- Game attendance: 5,789
- Referee: Trennis Livingston
- TV announcers (ESPNU): Bill Roth (play-by-play) and Rene Ingoglia (analyst)

Scoring summary
1	13:03	CAM	Bryant Barr 10-yard rush (Robert Brown kick) (6 plays, 75 yards, 1:57)	CAM 7–0
1	08:37	GASO	Alex Raynor 41-yard field goal (9 plays, 41 yards, 4:26)	CAM 7–3
1	06:31	CAM	Jai Williams 40-yard pass from Hajj-Malik Williams (Robert Brown PAT failed) (4 plays, 75 yards, 2:06)	CAM 13–3
2	04:50	GASO	Alex Raynor 39-yard field goal (13 plays, 77 yards, 5:59)	CAM 13–6
3	13:38	CAM	Hajj-Malik Williams 8-yard rush (Robert Brown kick) (4 plays, 26 yards, 1:15)	CAM 20–6
3	07:32	GASO	D. J. Butler 1-yard pass from Shai Werts (Alex Raynor kick) (10 plays, 75 yards, 6:06)	CAM 20–13
4	13:50	GASO	J. D. King 4-yard rush (Alex Raynor kick) (2 plays, 9 yards, 0:47)	TIE 20–20
4	06:42	GASO	Shai Werts 41-yard rush (Alex Raynor kick) (6 plays, 95 yards, 3:27)	GASO 27–20
4	00:15	CAM	Jalen Kelsey 20-yard pass from Hajj-Malik Williams (Hajj-Malik Williams two-point conversion pass attempt failed) (8 plays, 64 yards, 1:44)	GASO 27–26

Statistics	Campbell	Georgia Southern
First downs	17	20
Total yards	380	346
Rushing yards	143	284
Passing yards	237	62
Turnovers	0	1
Time of possession	26:04	33:56

Team	Category	Player	Statistics
Campbell	Passing	Hajj-Malik Williams	17/27, 237 yards, 2 TDs
Campbell	Rushing	Hajj-Malik Williams	11 carries, 73 yards, 1 TD
Campbell	Receiving	Jai Williams	4 receptions, 72 yards, 1 TD
Georgia Southern	Passing	Shai Werts	7/13, 53 yards, 1 TD
Georgia Southern	Rushing	Shai Werts	14 carries, 155 yards, 1 TD
Georgia Southern	Receiving	D. J. Butler	3 receptions, 22 yards, 1 TD

=== At Coastal Carolina ===
Campbell at Coastal Carolina

Team	1	2	3	4	Total
Fighting Camels	0	9	0	12	21
• Chanticleers	14	7	7	15	43

- Date: September 18, 2020
- Location: Brooks Stadium
  Conway, SC
- Game start: 7:30 p.m. EDT
- Elapsed time: 3 hours and 19 minutes
- Game attendance: 5,000
- Game weather: 73 °F (23 °C) • Weather: Cloudy • Wind: N 9 MPH
- Referee: Marshall Lewis
- TV announcers (ESPN): Tom Hart (play–by–play), Andre Ware (analyst), and Cole Cubelic (sideline reporter)

Scoring summary
1	8:08	CCU	C.J. Marable 2 yard run (Massimo Biscardi kick) (5 plays, 56 yards, 1:40)	CCU 7–0
1	0:34	CCU	Shermari Jones 3-yard run (Massimo Biscardi kick) (9 plays, 62 yards, 4:24)	CCU 14–0
2	11:18	CAMP	Robert Brown 45–yard field goal (9 plays, 47 yards, 4:16)	CCU 14–3
2	6:23	CCU	Jaivon Heiligh 21-yard pass from Grayson McCall (Massimo Biscardi kick) (11 plays, 86 yards, 4:50)	CCU 21–3
2	0:59	CAM	C. J. Freeman 9–yard run (McKay Taylor two-point conversion rush failed) (11 plays, 85 yards, 5:20)	CCU 21–9
3	6:02	CCU	Reese White 3-yard run (Massimo Biscardi kick) (8 plays, 60 yards, 4:23)	CCU 28–9
4	14:57	CAM	Bryant Barr 7-yard run (Hajj-Malik Williams two-point conversion pass failed) (13 plays, 75 yards, 6:05)	CCU 28–15
4	13:55	CCU	C. J. Marable 9-yard run (Grayson McCall pass to Jaivon Heiligh for two-point Conversion) (3 plays, 74 yards, 0:56)	CCU 36–15
4	11:42	CCU	Isaiah Likely 57-yard pass from Grayson McCall (Massimo Biscardi kick) (1 play, 57 yards, 0:09)	CCU 43–15
4	3:02	CAM	Hajj-Malik Williams 4-yard run (Robert Brown kick blocked) (14 plays, 72 yards, 5:29)	CCU 43–21

Statistics	Campbell	Coastal Carolina
First downs	22	21
Total yards	342	466
Rushing yards	205	193
Passing yards	137	273
Turnovers	1	0
Time of possession	34:19	25:41

Team	Category	Player	Statistics
Campbell	Passing	Hajj-Malik Williams	12/25, 137 yards
Campbell	Rushing	C. J. Freeman	14 carries, 83 yards
Campbell	Receiving	Bryant Barr	3 receptions, 36 yards
Coastal Carolina	Passing	Grayson McCall	11/16, 273 yards, 2 TDs
Coastal Carolina	Rushing	C. J. Marable	11 carries, 51 yards
Coastal Carolina	Receiving	Isaiah Likely	3 receptions, 96 yards, 1 TD

=== At Appalachian State ===
Campbell at Appalachian State

Team	1	2	3	4	Total
Fighting Camels	7	6	0	8	21
• RV Mountaineers	7	10	21	14	52

- Date: September 26, 2020
- Location: Kidd Brewer Stadium
  Boone, NC
- Game start: 12:00 p.m. EDT
- Elapsed time: 3 hours and 21 minutes
- Game attendance: 350
- Game weather: 67 °F (19 °C) • Weather: Partly Cloudy • Wind: 0 MPH
- Referee: Kyle Olson
- TV announcers (ESPN+): Harrison Battle (play–by–play) and Stan Lewter (analyst)

Scoring summary
1	04:40	CAMP	Hajj-Malik Williams 1-yard rush (Isaac Riffle kick) (14 plays, 83 yards, 7:39)	CAMP 7–0
1	00:11	APST	Daetrich Harrington 17-yard rush (Chandler Staton kick) (10 plays, 82 yards, 4:22)	TIE 7–7
2	11:30	CAMP	Hajj-Malik Williams 10-yard rush (Isaac Riffle PAT failed) (10 plays, 75 yards, 3:41)	CAMP 13–7
2	03:22	APST	Chandler Staton 32-yard field goal (16 plays, 54 yards, 8:01)	CAMP 13–10
2	00:24	APST	Daetrich Harrington 2-yard rush (Chandler Staton kick) (11 plays, 51 yards, 1:35)	APST 17–13
3	10:56	APST	Daetrich Harrington 40-yard rush (Chandler Staton kick) (9 plays, 70 yards, 4:01)	APST 24–13
3	08:21	APST	Zac Thomas 6-yard rush (Chandler Staton kick) (4 plays, 46 yards, 1:21)	APST 31–13
3	05:02	APST	Nate Noel 5-yard rush (Chandler Staton kick) (5 plays, 56 yards, 1:50)	APST 38–13
4	09:10	APST	Daetrich Harrington 5-yard rush (Chandler Staton kick) (8 plays, 96 yards, 3:58)	APST 45–13
4	03:19	APST	Jacob Huesman 8-yard rush (Chandler Staton kick) (9 plays, 45 yards, 4:17)	APST 52–13
4	02:59	CAMP	Austin Hite 87-yard pass from Wiley Hartley (Wiley Hartley two-point conversion rush) (1 play, 87 yards, 0:13)	APST 52–21

Statistics	Campbell	Appalachian State
First downs	15	31
Total yards	305	535
Rushing yards	117	404
Passing yards	188	131
Turnovers	0	0
Time of possession	25:40	34:20

Team	Category	Player	Statistics
Campbell	Passing	Hajj-Malik Williams	7/19, 101 yards
Campbell	Rushing	Hajj-Malik Williams	14 carries, 44 yards, 2 TDs
Campbell	Receiving	Austin Hite	2 receptions, 93 yards, 1 TD
Appalachian State	Passing	Zac Thomas	12/18, 131 yards
Appalachian State	Rushing	Daetrich Harrington	32 carries, 211 yards, 4 TDs
Appalachian State	Receiving	Thomas Hennigan	3 receptions, 67 yards

=== At Wake Forest ===
Campbell at Wake Forest

Team	1	2	3	4	Total
Fighting Camels	0	7	7	0	14
• Demon Deacons	14	10	28	14	66

- Date: October 2, 2020
- Location: Truist Field at Wake Forest
  Winston–Salem, NC
- Game start: 7:05 p.m. EDT
- Elapsed time: 3 hours and 7 minutes
- Game attendance: 2,058
- Game weather: 62 °F (17 °C) • Weather: Partly Cloudy • Wind: NE 5 MPH
- Referee: Riley Johnson
- TV announcers (ACC Network): Mike Morgan (play–by–play), Eric MacLain (analyst), and Lauren Sisler (sideline reporter)

Scoring summary
1	04:51	WAKE	Christian Beal-Smith 2-yard rush (Nick Sciba kick) (10 plays, 80 yards, 3:27)	WAKE 7–0
1	01:49	WAKE	Christian Beal-Smith 10-yard rush (Nick Sciba kick) (3 plays, 22 yards, 1:07)	WAKE 14–0
2	08:42	CAMP	Mason Donaldson 7-yard pass from Hajj-Malik Williams (Isaac Riffle kick) (15 plays, 75 yards, 8:07)	WAKE 14–7
2	06:29	WAKE	Kenneth Walker III 12-yard rush (Nick Sciba kick) (7 plays, 71 yards, 1:59)	WAKE 21–7
2	00:51	WAKE	Nick Sciba 41-yard field goal (8 plays, 55 yards, 1:59)	WAKE 24–7
3	12:25	WAKE	Taylor Morin 9-yard pass from Sam Hartman (Nick Sciba kick) (8 plays, 78 yards, 2:30)	WAKE 31–7
3	11:26	WAKE	Zion Keith 45-yard interception returned (Nick Sciba kick) (3 plays, 0 yards, 0:50)	WAKE 38–7
3	06:28	WAKE	Christian Beal-Smith 5-yard rush (Nick Sciba kick) (10 plays, 76 yards, 4:01)	WAKE 45–7
3	04:26	CAMP	Hajj-Malik Williams 26-yard pass from Mason Donaldson (Isaac Riffle kick) (6 plays, 75 yards, 2:02)	WAKE 45–14
3	04:12	WAKE	Donavon Greene 96-yard kickoff returned (Jack Crane kick) (0 plays, 0 yards, 0:00)	WAKE 52–14
4	11:06	WAKE	Justice Ellison 7-yard rush (Jack Crane kick) (8 plays, 77 yards, 2:49)	WAKE 59–14
4	05:09	WAKE	Will Drawdy 8-yard rush (Jake Crane kick) (6 plays, 80 yards, 3:12)	WAKE 66–14

Statistics	Campbell	Wake Forest
First downs	22	29
Total yards	362	574
Rushing yards	120	299
Passing yards	242	275
Turnovers	4	0
Time of possession	34:33	25:27

Team	Category	Player	Statistics
Campbell	Passing	Hajj-Malik Williams	17/29, 187 yards, 1 TD, 2 INTs
Campbell	Rushing	Bryant Barr	14 carries, 42 yards
Campbell	Receiving	Jalen Kelsey	6 receptions, 62 yards
Wake Forest	Passing	Sam Hartman	12/16, 166 yards, 1 TD
Wake Forest	Rushing	Christian Beal-Smith	20 carries, 130 yards, 3 TDs
Wake Forest	Receiving	A. T. Perry	5 receptions, 81 yards
