= Chris Pincince =

American football coach (born 1972)

Current position
- Title: Head coach
- Team: Susquehanna
- Conference: Landmark
- Record: 10–1

Biographical details
- Born: February 23, 1972 (age 54); Woonsocket, Rhode Island, U.S.
- Education: Boston University (1994)

Playing career
- 1990–1993: Boston University
- Position: Quarterback

Coaching career (HC unless noted)
- 1994–1996: New Haven (WR)
- 1997–1998: Fairfield (OC/QB)
- 1999–2001: New Haven (OC)
- 2002: Brown (QB)
- 2003: Ursinus (OC)
- 2004–2005: Holy Cross (co-OC/WR)
- 2006–2007: Holy Cross (OC/WR)
- 2008–2010: Rhode Island (OC/QB)
- 2011–2013: Elon (OC/RB/WR)
- 2014–2024: New Haven
- 2025: Post (WR)
- 2026–present: Susquehanna

Head coaching record
- Overall: 86–35
- Tournaments: 2–5 (NCAA D-II playoffs)

Accomplishments and honors

Championships
- 5 NE-10 (2019, 2021–2024); 1 Landmark (2026)

Christopher Pincince (born February 23, 1972) is an American college football coach. He is the head football coach for Susquehanna University, a position he has held since 2026. He was the wide receivers coach for Post University, a position he held in 2025. He was the head football coach for the University of New Haven from 2014 to 2024. He also coached for Fairfield, Brown, Ursinus, Holy Cross, Rhode Island, and Elon. He played college football for Boston University as a quarterback.

== Head coaching record ==
Year	Team	Overall	Conference	Standing	Bowl/playoffs	AFCA^{#}
New Haven Chargers (Northeast-10 Conference) (2014–2024)
2014	New Haven	6–5	6–3	T–3rd		
2015	New Haven	7–4	7–2	2nd		
2016	New Haven	7–4	6–3	T–3rd		
2017	New Haven	6–4	5–4	T–4th		
2018	New Haven	9–3	8–1	2nd	L NCAA Division II Second Round	23
2019	New Haven	7–3	6–2	T–1st		
2020–21	No team—COVID-19					
2021	New Haven	10–2	8–0	1st	L NCAA Division II Second Round	14
2022	New Haven	8–3	6–1	T–1st	L NCAA Division II First Round	
2023	New Haven	8–3	6–1	1st	L NCAA Division II First Round	
2024	New Haven	8–3	7–1	1st	L NCAA Division II First Round	
New Haven:		76–34	65–18			
Susquehanna River Hawks (Landmark Conference) (2026–present)
2026	Susquehanna	10–1	6–0	1st		
Susquehanna:		10–1	6–0			
Total:		86–35				
National championship Conference title Conference division title or championship game berth
