= 2020 Kennesaw State Owls football team =

American college football season

2020 Kennesaw State Owls football
- Conference: Big South Conference

Ranking
- STATS: No. 17
- FCS Coaches: No. 15
- Record: 4–1 (2–1 Big South)
- Head coach: Brian Bohannon (6th season)
- Offensive coordinator: Grant Chesnut (6th season)
- Offensive scheme: Flexbone option
- Defensive coordinator: Danny Verpaele (1st season)
- Base defense: 4–2–5
- Home stadium: Fifth Third Bank Stadium

2020 Big South Conference football standings
	Conf.			Overall
Team	W		L	W		L
No. 10 Monmouth $^	3	–	0	3	–	1
No. 17 Kennesaw State	2	–	1	4	–	1
Charleston Southern	2	–	2	2	–	2
Gardner–Webb	0	–	2	2	–	2
Robert Morris	0	–	2	0	–	3
$ – Conference champion; ^ – FCS playoff participant; Notes: Due to COVID-19, the Big South suspended the fall 2020 football season. Hampton opted out of the spring schedule. Campbell and North Alabama played only in the fall.; Rankings from STATS Poll

The 2020 Kennesaw State Owls football team represented Kennesaw State University in the 2020 NCAA Division I FCS football season. They were led by sixth-year head coach Brian Bohannon and played their home games at Fifth Third Bank Stadium in Kennesaw, Georgia as sixth-year members of the Big South Conference.

== Preseason ==
=== Polls ===
In June 2020, the Owls were predicted to finish first in the Big South by a panel of media and head coaches.

== Schedule ==
Kennesaw State had games scheduled against Point, Hampton, Alabama State and Tarleton State, but they were canceled due to the COVID-19 pandemic.

Date	Time	Opponent	Rank	Site	TV	Result	Attendance
February 27	1:00 p.m.	Shorter*	No. 8	Fifth Third Bank Stadium; Kennesaw, GA	ESPN+	W 35–3	
March 13	1:00 p.m.	Charleston Southern	No. 9	Fifth Third Bank Stadium; Kennesaw, GA	ESPN+	W 24–19	
March 20	1:00 p.m.	Dixie State*	No. 9	Fifth Third Bank Stadium; Kennesaw, GA	ESPN+	W 37–27	
~~March 27~~	~~1:00 p.m.~~	~~at Gardner–Webb~~	No. 8	~~Ernest W. Spangler Stadium~~; ~~Boiling Springs, NC~~	~~ESPN+~~	Postponed	
April 3	1:00 p.m.	Robert Morris	No. 7	Fifth Third Bank Stadium; Kennesaw, GA	ESPN+	W 35–0	
April 10	1:00 p.m.	at No. 20 Monmouth	No. 7	Kessler Field; West Long Branch, NJ	ESPN+	L 17–42	
*Non-conference game; Rankings from STATS Poll released prior to the game; All times are in Eastern time
