= 2026 Robert Morris Colonials football team =

American college football season

2026 Robert Morris Colonials football
- Conference: Northeast Conference
- Record: 6–6 (4–3 NEC)
- Head coach: Bernard Clark Jr. (9th season)
- Offensive coordinator: Troy Rothenbuhler (2nd season)
- Defensive coordinator: Marshall Cooper (1st season)
- Home stadium: Joe Walton Stadium

2026 Northeast Conference football standings
	Conf.			Overall
Team	W		L	W		L
LIU +^	5	–	2	5	–	7
Duquesne +	5	–	2	6	–	5
Central Connecticut +	5	–	2	6	–	5
Robert Morris	4	–	3	6	–	6
Wagner	3	–	4	4	–	8
Stonehill	3	–	4	4	–	8
New Haven*	2	–	5	3	–	9
Mercyhurst*	1	–	6	2	–	10
+ – Conference co-champions; ^ – FCS playoff participant; * – Ineligible for NEC title and FCS postseason play due to transition from NCAA Division II.; As of November 21, 2026; Rankings from STATS Poll

The 2026 Robert Morris Colonials football team represent Robert Morris University as a member of the Northeast Conference (NEC) during the 2026 NCAA Division I FCS football season. The Colonials, who are led by ninth-year head coach Bernard Clark, play their home games at the Joe Walton Stadium in Moon Township, Pennsylvania.

== Schedule ==
Date	Time	Opponent	Site	TV	Result	Attendance
August 29	12:00 p.m.	at Wagner	Wagner College Stadium; Staten Island, NY	ESPN+	W 28–7	1,757
September 5	6:00 p.m.	West Virginia State*	Joe Walton Stadium; Moon Township, PA	NEC Front Row	W 29–9	1,583
September 12	3:30 p.m.	at Akron*	InfoCision Stadium; Akron, OH	ESPN+	L 10–45	10,032
September 26	3:30 p.m.	at Buffalo*	Broadview Stadium; Amherst, NY	ESPN+	L 28–31	11,449
October 3	2:00 p.m.	Norfolk State*^{†}	Joe Walton Stadium; Moon Township, PA	NEC Front Row	W 33–31	3,001
October 10	12:00 p.m.	at Morgan State*	Hughes Stadium; Baltimore, MD	ESPN+	L 27–28	11,200
October 17	12:00 p.m.	New Haven	Joe Walton Stadium; Moon Township, PA	NEC Front Row	L 15–26	1,235
October 24	2:00 p.m.	Mercyhurst	Joe Walton Stadium; Moon Township, PA	NEC Front Row	W 28–14	1,451
October 31	12:00 p.m.	at Central Connecticut	Arute Field; New Britain, CT	NEC Front Row	L 14–49	2,049
November 7	12:00 p.m.	at Duquesne	Rooney Field; Pittsburgh, PA	NEC Front Row	W 13–10	1,595
November 14	12:00 p.m.	Stonehill	Joe Walton Stadium; Moon Township, PA	NEC Front Row	W 14–3	1,192
November 21	12:00 p.m.	LIU	Joe Walton Stadium; Moon Township, PA	NEC Front Row	L 22–26	1,150
*Non-conference game; ^{†}Homecoming; All times are in Eastern time

== Game summaries ==
=== at Wagner ===
Robert Morris Colonials (0–0) at Wagner Seahawks (0–0) – Game summary

Quarter	1	2	3	4	Total
Colonials	14	0	7	7	28
Seahawks	0	0	7	0	7

at Wagner College Stadium • Staten Island, New York

- Date: August 29
- Game time: 12:00 p.m.
- Game weather: Sunny • Temperature: 75 °F (24 °C)
- Game attendance: 1,757
- Referee: Mike Quinn
- TV announcers (ESPN+): Paul Dottino (play-by-play) and Kevin Gilbride (analyst)

Game information

First quarter

- RMU – Galen Combs 22-yard punt return (Lucca Valens kick), 9:21. Colonials 7–0.
- RMU – Jaqai Carter 6-yard pass from Carson Haggard (Lucca Valens kick), 6:51. Colonials 14–0. Drive: 4 plays, 26 yards, 2:20.

Second quarter

- No scoring plays.

Third quarter

- WAG – Julio Tatis 40-yard interception return (Johnny DiSalvatore kick), 13:18. Colonials 14–7.
- RMU – Galen Combs 64-yard pass from Carson Haggard (Lucca Valens kick), 2:03. Colonials 21–7. Drive: 3 plays, 75 yards, 1:34.

Fourth quarter

- RMU – Galen Combs 15-yard pass from Carson Haggard (Lucca Valens kick), 5:35. Colonials 28–7. Drive: 15 plays, 76 yards, 8:20.

Statistics	RMU	WAG
First downs	13	6
Plays–yards	64–285	57–97
Rushes–yards	32–79	26–22
Passing yards	206	75
Passing: comp–att–int	19–32–2	14–31–0
Turnovers	2	1
Time of possession	33:49	26:11

Team	Category	Player	Statistics
Robert Morris	Passing	Carson Haggard	19/32, 206 yards, 3 TD, 2 INT
Robert Morris	Rushing	J'Kharri Thomas	14 carries, 28 yards
Robert Morris	Receiving	Galen Combs	4 receptions, 104 yards, 2 TD
Wagner	Passing	Jack Stevens	10/19, 63 yards
Wagner	Rushing	Matt Morad	10 carries, 32 yards
Wagner	Receiving	Zion Fowler-El	4 receptions, 30 yards

=== West Virginia State (DII) ===
West Virginia State Yellow Jackets (DII) (1–0) at Robert Morris Colonials (1–0) – Game summary

Quarter	1	2	3	4	Total
Yellow Jackets (DII)	0	9	0	0	9
Colonials	8	7	14	0	29

at Joe Walton Stadium • Moon Township, Pennsylvania

- Date: September 5
- Game time: 6:00 p.m.
- Game weather: Cloudy • Temperature: 77 °F (25 °C) • Wind: N at 8 miles per hour (13 km/h)
- Game attendance: 1,583
- Referee: Michael Davis
- TV: NEC Front Row

Game information

First quarter

- (6:45) RMU – Galen Combs 42-yard pass from Carson Haggard, Bryson Costa rush (Drive: 4 plays, 61 yards, 1:38; Robert Morris 8–0)

Second quarter

- (14:12) WVSU – Joseph Shrader 23-yard field goal (Drive: 8 plays, 57 yards, 2:45; Robert Morris 8–3)
- (10:24) RMU – Carson Haggard 18-yard run, Lucca Valens kick (Drive: 7 plays, 75 yards, 3:48; Robert Morris 15–3)
- (3:08) WVSU – Amare Ary 8-yard pass from Joe Dailey (Drive: 16 plays, 77 yards, 7:10; Robert Morris 15–9)

Third quarter

- (9:49) RMU – Jaqai Carter 23-yard pass from Carson Haggard, Lucca Valens kick (Drive: 8 plays, 69 yards, 5:04; Robert Morris 22–9)
- (1:18) RMU – Galen Combs 42-yard pass from Carson Haggard, Lucca Valens kick (Drive: 5 plays, 80 yards, 3:06; Robert Morris 29–9)

Fourth quarter

No scoring plays

Statistics	WVSU	RMU
First downs	17	20
Plays–yards	66–310	64–427
Rushes–yards	33–162	37–176
Passing yards	148	251
Passing: comp–att–int	10–33–1	15–27–0
Turnovers	1	0
Time of possession	26:33	33:27

Team	Category	Player	Statistics
West Virginia State	Passing	Bryan Johnson	4/18, 86 yards
West Virginia State	Rushing	Joe Dailey	12 carries, 71 yards
West Virginia State	Receiving	Malik Baker	5 receptions, 74 yards
Robert Morris	Passing	Carson Haggard	13/25, 224 yards, 3 TD
Robert Morris	Rushing	Keino Fitzpatrick II	12 carries, 76 yards
Robert Morris	Receiving	Galen Combs	2 receptions, 84 yards, 2 TD

=== at Akron (FBS) ===
Robert Morris Colonials (2–0) at Akron Zips (FBS) (0–1) – Game summary

Quarter	1	2	3	4	Total
Colonials	0	10	0	0	10
Zips (FBS)	7	14	10	14	45

at InfoCision Stadium • Akron, Ohio

- Date: September 12
- Game time: 3:30 p.m.
- Game weather: Rain • Temperature: 74 °F (23 °C) • Wind: S at 8 miles per hour (13 km/h)
- Game attendance: 10,032
- Referee: Jason Berg
- TV announcers (ESPN+): Anthony Lima and Ryan Cavanaugh

Game information

First quarter

- AKR – Sean Patrick 41-yard pass from Cibastian Broughton (Matthew Schramm kick), 3:52. Zips 7–0. Drive: 9 plays, 82 yards, 4:39.

Second quarter

- RMU – Galen Combs 43-yard pass from Carson Haggard (Lucca Valens kick), 14:51. Tied 7–7. Drive: 8 plays, 70 yards, 4:01.
- AKR – Elijah Alexander 25-yard pass from Cibastian Broughton (Matthew Schramm kick), 13:19. Zips 14–7. Drive: 3 plays, 40 yards, 1:20.
- AKR – Miles Burris 6-yard pass from Cibastian Broughton (Matthew Schramm kick), 5:45. Zips 21–7. Drive: 10 plays, 62 yards, 5:42.
- RMU – Lucca Valens 22-yard field goal, 0:00. Zips 21–10. Drive: 7 plays, 56 yards, 0:51.

Third quarter

- AKR – Matthew Schramm 38-yard field goal, 8:55. Zips 24–10. Drive: 6 plays, 22 yards, 2:31.
- AKR – Jordan Gant 1-yard run (Matthew Schramm kick), 5:21. Zips 31–10. Drive: 4 plays, 29 yards, 1:07.

Fourth quarter

- AKR – Elijah Alexander 3-yard pass from Cibastian Broughton (Matthew Schramm kick), 11:45. Zips 38–10. Drive: 10 plays, 86 yards, 5:42.
- AKR – Brayden Roggow 15-yard run (Aidan Stire kick), 3:27. Zips 45–10. Drive: 11 plays, 80 yards, 5:13.

Statistics	RMU	AKR
First downs	12	28
Plays–yards	49–194	72–523
Rushes–yards	19–14	39–241
Passing yards	180	282
Passing: comp–att–int	20–30–0	28–33–0
Turnovers	2	1
Time of possession	24:46	35:14

Team	Category	Player	Statistics
Robert Morris	Passing	Carson Haggard	19/28, 179 yards, TD
Robert Morris	Rushing	Keino Fitzpatrick II	10 carries, 11 yards
Robert Morris	Receiving	Galen Combs	9 receptions, 119 yards, TD
Akron	Passing	Cibastian Broughton	23/27, 227 yards, 4 TD
Akron	Rushing	Jordan Gant	12 carries, 81 yards, TD
Akron	Receiving	Sean Patrick	4 receptions, 65 yards, TD

=== at Buffalo (FBS) ===
Robert Morris Colonials (2–1) at Buffalo Bulls (FBS) (1–1) – Game summary

Quarter	1	2	3	4	Total
Colonials	0	0	0	0	0
Bulls (FCS)	0	0	0	0	0

at Broadview Stadium • Amherst, New York

- Date: September 26
- Game time: 3:30 p.m.
- TV announcers (ESPN+): Joey Lindstrom and Tre Watson

Game information

First quarter
Second quarter
Third quarter
Fourth quarter

Statistics	RMU	BUFF
First downs		
Plays–yards		
Rushes–yards		
Passing yards		
Passing: comp–att–int		
Turnovers		
Time of possession		

Team	Category	Player	Statistics
Robert Morris	Passing		
Robert Morris	Rushing		
Robert Morris	Receiving		
Buffalo	Passing		
Buffalo	Rushing		
Buffalo	Receiving		

=== Norfolk State ===
Norfolk State Spartans (3–2) at Robert Morris Colonials (2–2) – Game summary

Quarter	1	2	3	4	Total
Spartans	0	0	0	0	0
Colonials	0	0	0	0	0

at Joe Walton Stadium • Moon Township, Pennsylvania

- Date: October 3
- Game time: 12:00 p.m.

Game information

First quarter
Second quarter
Third quarter
Fourth quarter

Statistics	NORF	RMU
First downs		
Plays–yards		
Rushes–yards		
Passing yards		
Passing: comp–att–int		
Turnovers		
Time of possession		

Team	Category	Player	Statistics
Norfolk State	Passing		
Norfolk State	Rushing		
Norfolk State	Receiving		
Robert Morris	Passing		
Robert Morris	Rushing		
Robert Morris	Receiving		

=== at Morgan State ===
Robert Morris Colonials (3–2) at Morgan State Bears (4–1) – Game summary

Quarter	1	2	3	4	Total
Colonials	0	0	0	0	0
Bears	0	0	0	0	0

at Hughes Stadium • Baltimore, Maryland

- Date: October 10
- Game time: 1:00 p.m.

Game information

First quarter
Second quarter
Third quarter
Fourth quarter

Statistics	RMU	MORG
First downs		
Plays–yards		
Rushes–yards		
Passing yards		
Passing: comp–att–int		
Turnovers		
Time of possession		

Team	Category	Player	Statistics
Robert Morris	Passing		
Robert Morris	Rushing		
Robert Morris	Receiving		
Morgan State	Passing		
Morgan State	Rushing		
Morgan State	Receiving		

=== New Haven ===
New Haven Chargers (1–5) at Robert Morris Colonials (3–3) – Game summary

Quarter	1	2	3	4	Total
Chargers	0	0	0	0	0
Colonials	0	0	0	0	0

at Joe Walton Stadium • Moon Township, Pennsylvania

- Date: October 17
- Game time: 12:00 p.m.

Game information

First quarter
Second quarter
Third quarter
Fourth quarter

Statistics	NH	RMU
First downs		
Plays–yards		
Rushes–yards		
Passing yards		
Passing: comp–att–int		
Turnovers		
Time of possession		

Team	Category	Player	Statistics
New Haven	Passing		
New Haven	Rushing		
New Haven	Receiving		
Robert Morris	Passing		
Robert Morris	Rushing		
Robert Morris	Receiving		

=== Mercyhurst ===
Mercyhurst Lakers (1–6) at Robert Morris Colonials (3–4) – Game summary

Quarter	1	2	3	4	Total
Lakers	0	0	0	0	0
Colonials	0	0	0	0	0

at Joe Walton Stadium • Moon Township, Pennsylvania

- Date: October 24
- Game time: 2:00 p.m.

Game information

First quarter
Second quarter
Third quarter
Fourth quarter

Statistics	MERC	RMU
First downs		
Plays–yards		
Rushes–yards		
Passing yards		
Passing: comp–att–int		
Turnovers		
Time of possession		

Team	Category	Player	Statistics
Mercyhurst	Passing		
Mercyhurst	Rushing		
Mercyhurst	Receiving		
Robert Morris	Passing		
Robert Morris	Rushing		
Robert Morris	Receiving		

=== at Central Connecticut ===
Robert Morris Colonials (4–4) at Central Connecticut Blue Devils (4–3) – Game summary

Quarter	1	2	3	4	Total
Colonials	0	0	0	0	0
Blue Devils	0	0	0	0	0

at Arute Field • New Britain, Connecticut

- Date: October 31

Game information

First quarter
Second quarter
Third quarter
Fourth quarter

Statistics	RMU	CCSU
First downs		
Plays–yards		
Rushes–yards		
Passing yards		
Passing: comp–att–int		
Turnovers		
Time of possession		

Team	Category	Player	Statistics
Robert Morris	Passing		
Robert Morris	Rushing		
Robert Morris	Receiving		
Central Connecticut	Passing		
Central Connecticut	Rushing		
Central Connecticut	Receiving		

=== at Duquesne ===
Robert Morris Colonials (4–5) at Duquesne Dukes (4–4) – Game summary

Quarter	1	2	3	4	Total
Colonials	0	0	0	0	0
Dukes	0	0	0	0	0

at Rooney Field • Pittsburgh, Pennsylvania

- Date: November 7
- Game time: 12:00 p.m.

Game information

First quarter
Second quarter
Third quarter
Fourth quarter

Statistics	RMU	DUQ
First downs		
Plays–yards		
Rushes–yards		
Passing yards		
Passing: comp–att–int		
Turnovers		
Time of possession		

Team	Category	Player	Statistics
Robert Morris	Passing		
Robert Morris	Rushing		
Robert Morris	Receiving		
Duquesne	Passing		
Duquesne	Rushing		
Duquesne	Receiving		

=== Stonehill ===
Stonehill Skyhawks (4–6) at Robert Morris Colonials (5–5) – Game summary

Quarter	1	2	3	4	Total
Skyhawks	0	0	0	0	0
Colonials	0	0	0	0	0

at Joe Walton Stadium • Moon Township, Pennsylvania

- Date: November 14
- Game time: 12:00 p.m.

Game information

First quarter
Second quarter
Third quarter
Fourth quarter

Statistics	STO	RMU
First downs		
Plays–yards		
Rushes–yards		
Passing yards		
Passing: comp–att–int		
Turnovers		
Time of possession		

Team	Category	Player	Statistics
Stonehill	Passing		
Stonehill	Rushing		
Stonehill	Receiving		
Robert Morris	Passing		
Robert Morris	Rushing		
Robert Morris	Receiving		

=== LIU ===
LIU Sharks (4–7) at Robert Morris Colonials (6–5) – Game summary

Quarter	1	2	3	4	Total
Sharks	0	0	0	0	0
Colonials	0	0	0	0	0

at Joe Walton Stadium • Moon Township, Pennsylvania

- Date: November 21
- Game time: 12:00 p.m.

Game information

First quarter
Second quarter
Third quarter
Fourth quarter

Statistics	LIU	RMU
First downs		
Plays–yards		
Rushes–yards		
Passing yards		
Passing: comp–att–int		
Turnovers		
Time of possession		

Team	Category	Player	Statistics
LIU	Passing		
LIU	Rushing		
LIU	Receiving		
Robert Morris	Passing		
Robert Morris	Rushing		
Robert Morris	Receiving		

== Rankings ==
Ranking movements Legend: ██ Increase in ranking ██ Decrease in ranking — = Not ranked RV = Received votes
	Week														
Poll	Pre	1	2	3	4	5	6	7	8	9	10	11	12	13	Final
STATS	—	—	—	—	—	—	—								
Coaches	—	—	RV	RV	RV	—	RV								
