= Bernard Clark =

American football player and coach (born 1967)

Robert Morris Colonials
- Title: Head coach

Personal information
- Born: January 12, 1967 (age 59); Tampa, Florida, U.S.
- Listed height: 6 ft 2 in (1.88 m)
- Listed weight: 248 lb (112 kg)

Career information
- High school: A. P. Leto (Tampa, Florida)
- College: Miami (FL)
- NFL draft: 1990: 3rd round, 65th overall pick

Career history

Playing
- Cincinnati Bengals (1990–1991); Seattle Seahawks (1991); Dallas Cowboys (1992)*; Orlando Predators (1994, 1996)
- * Offseason or practice squad member only

Coaching
- James Madison (1998–1999) Defensive ends coach; Liberty (2000–2003) Special teams coordinator & linebackers coach; FIU (2004–2005) Defensive coordinator & linebackers coach; South Florida (2006) Defensive line coach; FIU (2007–2008) Defensive line coach; Hampton (2009) Defensive coordinator; Pittsburgh (2010) Linebackers coach; Colorado State (2011) Linebackers coach; Hampton (2012–2013) Defensive coordinator; Albany (2014–2017) Defensive coordinator; Robert Morris (2018–present) Head coach

Awards and highlights
- Orange Bowl MVP; 2× National champion (1987, 1989)
- Stats at Pro Football Reference

Bernard "Tiger" Clark (born January 12, 1967) is an American football coach and former player. He is head football coach at Robert Morris University, a position he has held since the 2018 season. Clark played professionally as a linebacker in the National Football League (NFL) with the Cincinnati Bengals and Seattle Seahawks. He played college football at the University of Miami in Coral Gables, Florida.

== Early life and playing career ==
Clark, a 1985 graduate of A. P. Leto High School in Tampa, Florida, played middle linebacker while at the University of Miami from 1985 to 1989. He caught his big break in the 1988 Orange Bowl when he replaced a suspended George Mira Jr., where he had an outstanding game and was voted Orange Bowl MVP.

Pre-draft measurables
Height	Weight	Arm length	Hand span	40-yard dash	10-yard split	20-yard split	20-yard shuttle	Vertical jump	Broad jump	Bench press
6 ft 1 3/8 in (1.86 m)	250 lb (113 kg)	32 3/8 in (0.82 m)	8 3/4 in (0.22 m)	4.99 s	1.70 s	2.92 s	4.50 s	29.5 in (0.75 m)	8 ft 6 in (2.59 m)	16 reps
All values from NFL Combine

Clark was selected in the third round in the 1990 NFL draft with the 65th overall pick by the Cincinnati Bengals. He played two seasons in the National Football League (NFL), from 1990 to 1991 with the Bengals and the Seattle Seahawks, and two with the Orlando Predators in the Arena Football League.

== Coaching career ==
Clark began his coaching career at James Madison University, coaching defensive ends from 1998 to 1999. He then coached special teams and linebackers for three years (2000–2003) at Liberty University. In 2004, he became defensive coordinator for Florida International University (FIU). In 2006, Clark became the defensive line coach at the University of South Florida in his hometown of Tampa for one season before returning to FIU as the defensive line coach in 2007. In 2009, he became the defensive coordinator at Hampton University. In February 2010, Clark left Hampton to join Dave Wannstedt's coaching staff as linebackers coach at the University of Pittsburgh. Wannstedt had coached Clark at Miami.

== Head coaching record ==
Year	Team	Overall	Conference	Standing	Bowl/playoffs
Robert Morris Colonials (Northeast Conference) (2018–2019)
2018	Robert Morris	2–9	0–6	7th	
2019	Robert Morris	7–5	6–1	2nd	
Robert Morris Colonials (Big South Conference) (2020–2022)
2020–21	Robert Morris	0–3	0–2	T–4th	
2021	Robert Morris	4–6	3–5	7th	
2022	Robert Morris	0–11	0–5	6th	
Robert Morris Colonials (Big South–OVC Football Association) (2023)
2023	Robert Morris	4–7	2–4	T–6th	
Robert Morris Colonials (Northeast Conference) (2024–present)
2024	Robert Morris	7–5	4–2	3rd	
2025	Robert Morris	3–9	2–5	7th	
2026	Robert Morris	1–0	1–0		
Robert Morris:		28–55	18–30		
Total:		28–55			
