= Robert Morris Colonials football =

Football team that represents Robert Morris University

2026 Robert Morris Colonials football team
- First season: 1994; 32 years ago
- Head coach: Bernard Clark; 8th season, 27–55 (.329)
- Location: Moon Township, Pennsylvania
- Stadium: Joe Walton Stadium (capacity: 3,000)
- NCAA division: Division I FCS
- Conference: NEC
- Colors: Blue, white, and red
- All-time record: 151–182–1 (.454)

Conference championships
- NEC: 1996, 1997, 1998, 1999, 2000, 2010
- Outfitter: Under Armour

The Robert Morris Colonials football program is the intercollegiate American football team for the Robert Morris University located in the U.S. state of Pennsylvania. The team competes in the NCAA Division I Football Championship Subdivision (FCS). Formerly members of the Northeast Conference, the Colonials were originally intended to compete in the 2020 season as an FCS independent before becoming a football-only member of the Big South Conference in July 2021. The Colonials would ultimately join Big South football several months ahead of schedule. After COVID-19 caused the Big South to move its fall 2020 season to spring 2021, with two teams playing in the fall and a third not playing at all in 2020–21, the conference brought RMU into its football league for its spring 2021 season. In 2023, after playing in the Big South in 2023, the team returned to play in the Northeast Conference in 2024.

The school's first football team was fielded in 1994. The team plays its home games at the 3,000 seat Joe Walton Stadium. They are currently led by eighth-year head coach Bernard Clark.

== History ==
=== Classifications ===
- 1994–present: NCAA Division I–AA/FCS

=== Conference memberships ===
On June 15, Robert Morris Colonials announced leaving the Northeast Conference for the Horizon League in all sports except for football starting in 2020. The football program joined the Big South Conference in football 2021. For the 2020 football team, the Colonials were originally intended to play as an FCS independent. The team's 2020 schedule was to have been played as originally set, but all games would have been considered non-conference. However, this would change due to COVID-19 disruptions; the Big South brought RMU into its football league for its rescheduled spring 2021 season.

On November 28, 2023, Robert Morris announced a return to the Northeast Conference effective with the 2024 season as an associate member for football only.

- 1994–1995: Independent
- 1996–2019: Northeast Conference
- 2020–2023: Big South Conference
- 2024-: Northeast Conference

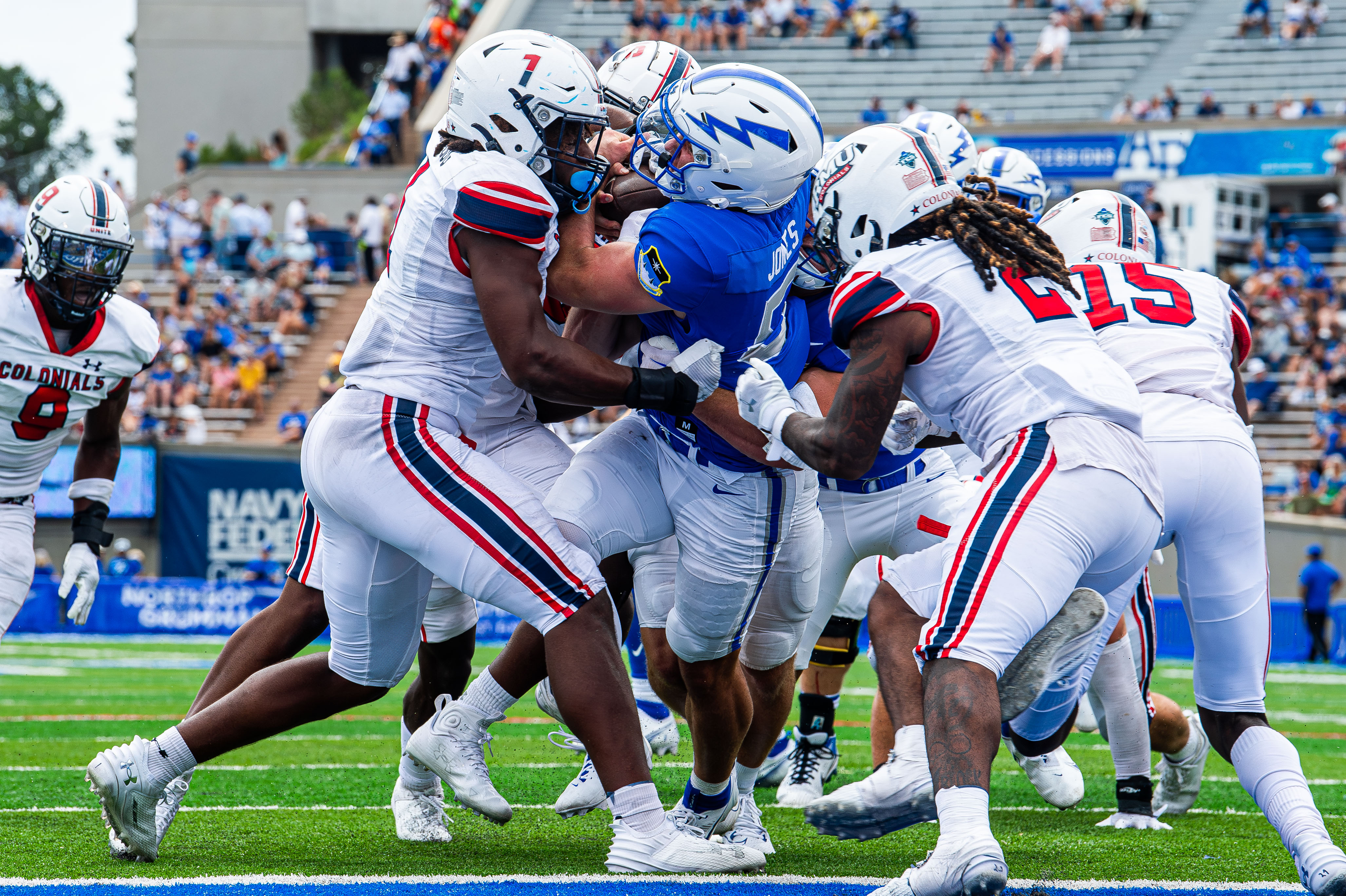
Robert Morris defenders attempt to bring down an Air Force ballcarrier during a 2023 game at Falcon Stadium

== Championships ==
=== Conference ===
Year	Coach	Conference	Overall record	Conference record
1996†	Joe Walton	Northeast Conference	9–2	3–1
1997	Joe Walton	Northeast Conference	8–3	4–0
1998†	Joe Walton	Northeast Conference	4–6	4–1
1999	Joe Walton	Northeast Conference	8–2	8–0
2000	Joe Walton	Northeast Conference	10–0	8–0
2010†	Joe Walton	Northeast Conference	8–3	7–1
Conference championships			6	

† Co-champions

== FCS playoffs results ==
The Colonials have appeared in the FCS playoffs one time with an overall record of 0–1.

Year	Round	Opponent	Result
2010	First round	North Dakota State	L 17–43

== Notable former players ==
Notable alumni include:

- Hank Fraley
- Tim Hall
- Tim Levcik
- Wale
- Matt Stasko
- Adam Thermann

== Future non-conference opponents ==
Future non-conference opponents announced as of July 15, 2026.

2026	2027	2028	2029	2033
West Virginia State	at Youngstown State		at West Virginia	at San Jose State
at Akron	Morgan State			
at Buffalo				
Norfolk State				
at Morgan State				
